= 1991–92 FC Guria season =

Guria
1991–92 season
- Manager: Gigla Imnadze
- Stadium: Guria stadium, Lanchkhuti
- Umaglesi Liga: 4th of 20
- Georgian Cup: Round of 16
- Top goalscorer: Otar Korgalidze (40)
- Biggest win: 8–2 v Mertskhali (home, 30 October)
- Biggest defeat: 0–6 v Tskhumi (away, 17 September)

The 1991–92 season was the 68th year in Guria's history and third season in the Umaglesi Liga. Apart from the league season, the club also participated in the 1991–92 Georgian Cup.

== Overview ==
Having retained most of the players from the previous year, Guria had an impressive start to the season. They had defeated each of their opponents at home by the winter break, aiming at the top title. However, the team slipped up as soon as the season resumed in the spring. Following four losses in the opening five matches, Guria dropped out of the top three spots. For the first time in the last four years, they did not win any silverware. Likewise, Guria were unsuccessful in the cup competition where they failed to reach even the round of 8. Although regarded as favourites of the tie against Mziuri, the team was knocked out under the away goals rule.

Yet one player individually performed beyond expectations. Midfielder Otar Korgalidze finished the second successive season as the league topscorer. This time he amassed 40 goals in 35 appearances, setting the league record.

== Statistics ==
=== Standings (part) ===
Pos	Team	Pld	W	D	L	GF	GA	GD	Pts
2	Tskhumi Sokhumi	38	24	4	10	96	53	+43	76
3	Gorda Rustavi	38	22	9	7	71	38	+33	75
4	Guria Lanchkhuti	38	22	3	13	89	56	+33	69
5	Kolkheti-1913 Poti	38	15	11	12	49	45	+4	56
6	Odishi Zugdidi	38	16	6	16	56	56	0	54

Source: rsssf.org
Rules for classification: 1st points; 2nd matches won; 3rd head-to-head

==== Matches ====
15 August 1	Guria	5 – 1	Amirani

20 August 2	Iberia	4 – 2	Guria

26 August 3	Mretebi	0 – 3	Guria

30 August 4	Guria	3 – 1	Kutaisi

7 September 5	Kolkheti 1913	1 – 0	Guria

11 September 6	Guria	4 – 0	Batumi

17 September 7	Tskhumi	6 – 0	Guria

22 September 8	Guria	4 – 1	Odishi

11 October 11	Guria	1 – 0	Alazani

19 October 12	Guria	2 – 0	Samgurali

24 October 13	Dila	1 – 1	Guria

30 October 14	Guria	8 – 2	Mertskhali

3 November 15	Mziuri	1 – 2	Guria

7 November 9	Margveti	0 – 0	Guria

11 November 16	Guria	2 – 0	Kolkheti Khobi

15 November 17	Shevardeni 1906	1 – 2	Guria

19 November 10	Guria	4 – 1	Gorda

22 November 18	Guria	3 – 2	Sulori

26 November 19	Sanavardo	4 – 2	Guria

17 March 22	Guria	1 – 2	Mretebi

21 March 23	Kutaisi	2 – 1	Guria

29 March 24	Guria	3 – 0	Kolkheti 1913

3 April 25	Batumi	2 – 1	Guria

17 April 27	Zugdidi	3 – 0	Guria

21 April 28	Guria	2 – 1	Margveti

25 April 29	Gorda	1 – 0	Guria

3 May 30	Guria	2 – 0	Alazani

8 May 31	Samgurali	1 – 0	Guria

11 May 20	Amirani	3 – 1	Guria

14 May 21	Guria	2 – 1	Iberia-Dinamo

17 May 32	Guria	5 – 1	Dila

20 May 33	Mertskhali	0 – 2	Guria

23 May 26	Guria	2 – 2	Tskhumi

30 May 34	Guria	2 – 0	Mziuri

4 June 35	Kolkheti Khobi	3 – 2	Guria

8 June 36	Guria	7 – 3	Shevardeni 1906

16 June 37	Sulori	4 – 3	Guria

20 June 38	Guria	5 – 1	Sanavardo

=== Appearances and goals ===
Pos.	Player	DOB	L App	L
GK	(Georgia (country)) Mamuka Abuseridze	1962	20	-
GK	(Georgia (country)) Avtandil Kantaria	1955	4	–
GK	(Georgia (country)) Mikheil Venjelashvili	1966	14	–
DF	(Georgia (country)) Gia Chkhaidze	1970	32	0
DF	(Georgia (country)) Badri Danelia	1962	10	0
DF	(Georgia (country)) A Gogichaishvili		7	0
DF	(Georgia (country)) Gocha Gujabidze	1971	35	0
DF	(Georgia (country)) Temur Kabisashvili	1967	9	0
DF	(Georgia (country)) Roman Kuridze	1965	25	0
DF	(Georgia (country)) Kakha Kvintradze	1971	20	3
DF	(Georgia (country)) Archil Nodia	1974	6	0
DF	(Georgia (country)) Makso Dundua		4	0
MF	(Georgia (country)) Mamuka Aptsiauri	1969	24	2
MF	(Georgia (country)) Levan Baratashvili	1964	21	1
MF	(Georgia (country)) Kakha Gogichaishvili	1969	26	3
MF	(Georgia (country)) Otar Korgalidze	1960	35	40
MF	(Georgia (country)) Nugzar Mikaberidze	1963	33	3
MF	(Georgia (country)) Georgi Nemsadze	1972	34	4
MF	(Georgia (country)) Tengiz Pataraia	1974	7	0
MF	(Georgia (country)) Merab Tevzadze	1964	35	5
FW	(Georgia (country)) Merab Megreladze	1956	25	6
FW	(Georgia (country)) Besik Pridonashvili	1961	23	9
FW	(Georgia (country)) Davit Ugrelidze	1964	20	13

=== Georgian Cup ===
==== Round of 32 ====
1st leg	Kartli	0–5	Guria	Gori

2nd leg	Guria	6–0	Kartli	Lanchkhuti

==== Round of 16 ====
1st leg	Mziuri	0–0	Guria	Gali

2nd leg	Guria	2–2	Mziuri	Lanchkhuti
