= 1992–93 Georgian Cup =

Tournament details
- Country: Georgia
- Teams: 44

Final positions
- Champions: Dinamo Tbilisi
- Runners-up: Batumi

The 1992–93 Georgian Cup (also known as the David Kipiani Cup) was the forty-ninth season overall and third since independence of the Georgian annual football tournament.

== Preliminary round ==
Team 1	Score	Team 2
Kiziki Tsnori	w/o	Salkhino Martvili
Tori Borjomi	0–1	Duruji Kvareli
Aragvi Dusheti	1–0	Algeti Marneuli
Kolkhi Gulripshi	w/o	Merani Tbilisi
Sioni Bolnisi	5–0	Bakhtrioni Akhmeta
Tskhinvali	1–2	Armazi-90 Tbilisi
Imedi Tbilisi	w/o	Sikharuli-90 Gagra
Guria-2 Lanchkhuti	1–1 (5–6 p)	Imedi Laituri
Mertskhali Ozurgeti	0–5	Antsi Tbilisi
Armazi Mtskheta	2–1	Merani-91 Tbilisi
Sapovnela Terjola	5–0	Kazneti Madneuli
Magharoeli Chiatura	2–0	Rkoni Kaspi

== Round of 32 ==
Team 1	Agg.	Team 2	1st leg	2nd leg
Kiziki Tsnori	w/o	Mziuri Gali	1–3	–
Duruji Kvareli	w/o	Amirani Ochamchire	–	–
Guria Lanchkhuti	3–3 (a)	Aragvi Dusheti	2–0	1–3
Kolkheti Khobi	w/o	Margveti Zestaponi	–	–
Merani Tbilisi	3–5	Batumi	2–1	1–4
Iveria Khashuri	1–3	Dila Gori	1–2	0–1
Sioni Bolnisi	9–5	Armazi-90 Tbilisi	4–1	5–4
Samgurali Tskaltubo	6–1	Imedi Tbilisi	6–1	0–0
Imedi Laituri	w/o	Tskhumi Sokhumi	1–4	–
Torpedo Kutaisi	3–3 (a)	Antsi Tbilisi	1–1	2–2
Armazi Mtskheta	5–7	Samtredia	3–2	2–5
Gorda Rustavi	3–4	Sapovnela Terjola	3–3	0–1
Dinamo Tbilisi	5–3	Mretebi Tbilisi	0–2	5–1
Kolkheti-1913 Poti	4–3	Alazani Gurjaani	2–0	2–3
Kakheti Telavi	5–5 (a)	Shevardeni-1906 Tbilisi	3–3	2–2
Magharoeli Chiatura	4–3	Odishi Zugdidi	4–1	0–2

== Round of 16 ==
Team 1	Agg.	Team 2	1st leg	2nd leg
Kiziki Tsnori	w/o	Duruji Kvareli	0–3	–
Margveti Zestaponi	4–1	Guria Lanchkhuti	2–0	2–1
Batumi	4–1	Dila Gori	3–0	1–1
Sioni Bolnisi	3–8	Samgurali Tskaltubo	3–1	0–7
Tskhumi Sokhumi	2–6	Torpedo Kutaisi	1–1	1–5
Samtredia	1–1 (a)	Sapovnela Terjola	1–1	0–0
Dinamo Tbilisi	7–0	Kolkheti-1913 Poti	7–0	–
Magharoeli Chiatura	2–6	Shevardeni-1906 Tbilisi	1–1	1–5

== Quarterfinals ==
Team 1	Agg.	Team 2	1st leg	2nd leg
Duruji Kvareli	3–4	Margveti Zestaponi	1–3	2–1
Samgurali Tskaltubo	1–2	Batumi	1–0	0–2
Sapovnela Terjola	2–4	Torpedo Kutaisi	0–0	2–4
Shevardeni-1906 Tbilisi	1–9	Dinamo Tbilisi	1–4	0–5

== Semifinals ==
Team 1	Agg.	Team 2	1st leg	2nd leg
Batumi	3–1	Margveti Zestaponi	1–0	2–1
Dinamo Tbilisi	6–1	Torpedo Kutaisi	3–0	3–1

== Final ==
26 May 1993

Dinamo Tbilisi	4–2	Batumi
R. Arveladze 4', 37'; A. Arveladze 22'; Sh. Arveladze 35'		Tugushi 26'; Khomeriki 78'

Boris Paichadze Stadium, Tbilisi
Attendance: 25,000
Referee: Sergo Kvaratskhelia (Zugdidi)

== See also ==
- 1992–93 Umaglesi Liga
- 1992–93 Pirveli Liga
