= 1991 FC Guria season =

Guria
1991 season
- Manager: Gigla Imnadze
- Stadium: Guria stadium, Lanchkhuti
- Umaglesi Liga: 2nd of 20
- Georgian Cup: Not held
- Top goalscorer: Otar Korgalidze (14)
- Biggest win: 4–1 v Kolkheti Khobi (home, 16 May); 5–2 v Mziuri (home, 30 May); 5–2 Iveria (home, 10 June); 6–3 Amirani (home, 21 June); 3–0 Sulori (away, 25 June)
- Biggest defeat: 0–3 v Kutaisi (away, 10 April)

The 1991 season was the 67th year in Guria's history and second season in the Umaglesi Liga. Based on the Federation's decision to switch to the autumn-spring system starting from late 1991, this season was transitional, lasting around three months. For the same reason, no cup tournament was held.

== Overview ==
Guria maintained the core of its squad from the previous season and the status of a title-chasing team. In a one-round competition, they shared the points with Iberia and produced a perfect home record with ten wins in as many games but dropped many points in away mid-season matches. Ultimately, despite an eight-game winning run in the closing stage, they fell short in the title race.

Otar Korgalidze shone again. This time he finished as the league top scorer with 14 goals in 18 matches.

== Statistics ==
=== Standings (part) ===
Pos	Team	Pld	W	D	L	GF	GA	GD	Pts
1	Iberia Tbilisi (C)	19	14	5	0	45	9	+36	47
2	Guria Lanchkhuti	19	14	4	1	38	15	+23	46
3	Kutaisi	19	11	2	6	34	30	+4	35
4	Kolkheti-1913 Poti	19	10	3	6	30	19	+11	33
5	Batumi	19	10	2	7	28	21	+7	32

Source: rsssf.org
Rules for classification: 1st points; 2nd matches won; 3rd head-to-head
(C) Champions

=== Matches ===
16 March 1	Guria	3 – 1	Margveti

21 March 2	Iberia	0 – 0	Guria

27 March 3	Guria	1 – 0	Alazani

3 April 4	Guria	1 – 0	Gorda

10 April 5	Kutaisi	3 – 0	Guria

14 April 6	Guria	1 – 0	Kolkheti Poti

20 April 7	Batumi	0 – 0	Guria

24 April 8	Guria	1 – 0	Tskhumi

12 May 9	Dila	1 – 1	Guria

16 May 10	Guria	4 – 1	Kolkheti Khobi

19 May 11	Odishi	1 – 1	Guria

22 May 12	Sanavardo	1 – 2	Guria

30 May 13	Guria	5 – 2	Mziuri

3 June 14	Samgurali	0 – 1	Guria

10 June 15	Guria	5 – 2	Iveria

25 June 16	Shevardeni 1906	0 – 1	Guria

17 June 17	Guria	2 – 0	Mertskhali

21 Jun 18	Guria	6 – 3	Amirani

25 June 19	Sulori	0 – 3	Guria

=== Appearances and goals ===
Pos.	Player	DOB	L App	L
GK	(Georgia (country)) Mamuka Abuseridze	1962	1	-
GK	(Georgia (country)) Avtandil Kantaria	1955	18	–
DF	(Georgia (country)) Badri Danelia	1962	17	0
DF	(Georgia (country)) Gocha Gujabidze	1971	17	0
DF	(Georgia (country)) Temur Kabisashvili	1967	17	0
DF	(Georgia (country)) Gela Ketashvili	1965	7	0
DF	(Georgia (country)) Roman Kuridze	1965	4	0
DF	(Georgia (country)) Kakha Kvintradze	1971	11	1
DF	(Georgia (country)) Gocha Tkebuchava	1963	15	1
DF	(Georgia (country)) Davit Tsomaia	1967	19	1
MF	(Georgia (country)) Levan Baratashvili	1964	9	0
MF	(Georgia (country)) Gia Chkhaidze	1970	9	0
MF	(Georgia (country)) Otar Korgalidze	1960	18	14
MF	(Georgia (country)) Mamuka Aptsiauri	1969	4	0
MF	(Georgia (country)) Nugzar Mikaberidze	1963	17	0
FW	(Georgia (country)) Merab Megreladze	1956	15	3
FW	(Georgia (country)) Besik Pridonashvili	1961	19	5
FW	(Georgia (country)) Davit Ugrelidze	1964	17	13
