= List of highest-scoring matches in Georgian top football league =

Georgia announced independence from Soviet football and started forming its own leagues on 15 February 1990, launching an inaugurating season at the end of March. Since then matches with high scoring and big winning margins have been recorded, most of them happening in early 1990s when the league consisted of at least 16 teams.

Multiple champions Dinamo Tbilisi are leading the charts in both categories. Their 12–4 home win against Gorda on 3 June 1993 is the highest scoring game. Dinamo repeated the feat of netting twelve times in a single match 16 years later.

The following is the list of matches with ten and more goals scored, comprising both the Umaglesi Liga (1990–2016) and its successor Erovnuli Liga.

Goals scored	Date	Home team	Result	Away team
16	3 June 1993	Dinamo Tbilisi	12–4	Gorda
12	23 May 2009	Dinamo Tbilisi	12–0	Borjomi
12	13 June 1993	Odishi	9–3	Magaroeli
11	4 November 1990	Kutaisi	8–3	Dila
11	8 June 1991	Dinamo Tbilisi	10–1	Sulori
11	22 November 1991	Tskhumi	11–0	Mertskhali
11	31 May 1994	Kakheti	7–4	Sapovnela
11	14 August 1994	Dinamo Tbilisi	10–1	Duruji
11	15 October 1994	Dinamo Tbilisi	10–1	Margveti
11	9 November 1995	Dinamo Tbilisi	11–0	Duruji
11	17 November 1995	Samtredia	8–3	Guria
11	18 March 1996	Dinamo Batumi	11–0	Duruji
11	8 April 1996	Dila	8–3	Duruji
11	11 May 2008	Dinamo Tbilisi	6–5	Locomotive
10	4 November 1990	Gorda	6–4	Sanavardo
10	30 October 1991	Guria	8–2	Mertskhali
10	30 October 1991	Dinamo Tbilisi	7–3	Mziuri
10	22 November 1991	Gorda	7–3	Alazani
10	8 June 1992	Guria	7–3	Shevardeni 1906
10	20 June 1992	Dinamo Tbilisi	8–2	Amirani
10	7 April 1993	Tskhumi	6–4	Odishi
10	2 November 1993	Dinamo Tbilisi	8–2	Kakheti
10	19 May 1995	Dinamo Tbilisi	8–2	Sapovnela
10	21 May 1996	Duruji	2–8	Dinamo Tbilisi
10	18 May 2002	Dinamo Tbilisi	10–0	Merani-91
10	7 March 2016	Samtredia	8–2	Saburtalo
10	18 August 2020	Chikhura	2–8	Saburtalo
10	8 May 2021	Sioni	3–7	Dinamo Tbilisi
10	16 September 2021	Dinamo Batumi	7–3	Locomotive

The record score for the biggest win is 12–0, which occurred on 23 May 2009. On this final day of the 2008–09 season, Dinamo Tbilisi thrashed Borjomi who have not featured in the league ever since. Three matches ended 11–0, all of them dated to the 1990s.

Shukura have gone down in history by losing three consecutive league games with a nine-goal margin in 2023. While their relegation was confirmed six rounds before the final day, Shukura played their final matches with the reserve team who suffered an all-time record-breaking home defeat and aggregate 27–0 within just eight days.

Goals margin	Date	Home team	Result	Away team
12	23 May 2009	Dinamo Tbilisi	12–0	Borjomi
11	22 November 1991	Tskhumi	11–0	Mertskhali
11	9 November 1995	Dinamo Tbilisi	11–0	Duruji
11	18 March 1996	Dinamo Batumi	11–0	Duruji
10	18 May 2002	Dinamo Tbilisi	10–0	Merani-91
9	8 June 1991	Dinamo Tbilisi	10–1	Sulori
9	18 May 1999	Dinamo Batumi	9–0	Odishi
9	17 November 2000	Dinamo Tbilisi	9–0	Sioni
9	2 April 2005	Dinamo Tbilisi	9–0	Dila
9	24 November 2023	Shukura	0–9	Samtredia
9	28 November 2023	Torpedo	9–0	Shukura
9	2 December 2023	Shukura	0–9	Gagra
8	31 May 1996	Dinamo Tbilisi	8–0	Sioni
8	23 October 2003	Tbilisi	8–0	Lazika
8	11 November 2018	Samtredia	0–8	Torpedo
