= 1991–92 Georgian Cup =

Tournament details
- Country: Georgia
- Teams: 60

Final positions
- Champions: Iberia-Dinamo Tbilisi
- Runners-up: Tskhumi Sokhumi

The 1991–92 Georgian Cup (also known as the David Kipiani Cup) was the forty-eighth season overall and second since independence of the Georgian annual football tournament.

== Preliminary round ==
Team 1	Agg.	Team 2	1st leg	2nd leg
Shukura Kobuleti	w/o	Gareji Sagarejo	4–3	–
Jejili Tbilisi	3–4	Kartli Gori	3–3	0–1
Krtsanisi Tbilisi	2–5	Aragvi Dusheti	1–3	1–2
Chabukiani	6–5	Meshakhte Tkibuli	3–1	3–4
Meskheti Akhaltsikhe	w/o	Sapovnela Terjola	0–3	–
Zghvavia Tsalenjikha	2–7	Magharoeli Chiatura	1–3	1–4
Salkhino Martvili	3–1	Imereti Khoni	3–1	0–0
Megobroba-89 Batumi	2–2 (2–3 p)	Imedi Laituri	2–0	0–2 (a.e.t.)
Iveria Khashuri	11–5	Imedi Tbilisi	4–2	7–3
Egrisi Senaki	6–6 (a)	Cherimela Kharagauli	4–1	2–5
Bakhtrioni Akhmeta	3–3 (a)	Armazi-90 Tbilisi	2–2	1–1
Mamisoni Oni	2–6	Armazi Mtskheta	1–1	1–5
Garisi Tetritskaro	3–5	Iberia Kareli	3–1	0–4
Surami	0–8	Shevardeni Zugdidi	0–2	0–6
Chikhura Sachkhere	3–5	Chela Darcheli	3–0	0–5
Merani-91 Tbilisi	3–5	Ertsukhi Tsnori	1–1	2–4

== Round of 64 ==
Team 1	Agg.	Team 2	1st leg	2nd leg
Merani Tbilisi	2–3	Gareji Sagarejo	2–2	0–1
Chabukiani	5–6	Sapovnela Terjola	3–2	2–4
Kartli Gori	3-–1	Aragvi Dusheti	3–0	0–1
Salkhino Martvili	4–4 (a)	Imedi Laituri	2–1	2–3
Guria-2 Lanchkhuti	1–4	Magharoeli Chiatura	1–1	0–3
Iveria Khashuri	3–4	Bakhmaro Chokhatauri	3–0	0–4
Antsi Tbilisi	3–4	Armazi-90 Tbilisi	2–2	1–2
Egrisi Senaki	3–5	Sioni Bolnisi	2–2	1–3
Samegrelo Chkhorotsku	3–4	Armazi Mtskheta	3–3	0–1
Iberia Kareli	w/o	Duruji Kvareli	–	–
Chela Darcheli	3–5	Shevardeni Zugdidi	3–2	0–3
Skuri Tsalenjikha	2–3	Ertsukhi Tsnori	0–1	2–2

== Round of 32 ==
Team 1	Agg.	Team 2	1st leg	2nd leg
Kolkheti Khobi	2–1	Gareji Sagarejo	1–0	1–1
Alazani Gurjaani	3–6	Batumi	2–0	1–6
Iberia-Dinamo Tbilisi	6–1	Mretebi Tbilisi	2–1	4–0
Sapovnela Terjola	4–2	Dila Gori	4–2	0–0
Mertskhali Ozurgeti	w/o	Mziuri Gali	4–3	–
Kartli Gori	0–11	Guria Lanchkhuti	0–5	0–6
Magharoeli Chiatura	3–2	Salkhino Martvili	3–1	0–1
Kutaisi	3–2	Gorda Rustavi	0–1	3–1
Margveti Zestaponi	4–2	Kolkheti-1913 Poti	3–1	1–1
Shevardeni-1906 Tbilisi	2–9	Tskhumi Sokhumi	1–5	1–4
Amirani Ochamchire	6–3	Bakhmaro Chokhatauri	3–1	3–2
Samtredia Tskaltubo	3–2	Armazi-90 Tbilisi	2–2	3–0
Samgurali Tskaltubo	3–4	Sioni Bolnisi	1–2	2–2
Armazi Mtskheta	2–4	Duruji Kvareli	1–1	1–3
Sulori Vani	2–6	Shevardeni Zugdidi	1–1	1–5
Ertsukhi Tsnori	2–3	Odishi Zugdidi	1–0	1–3

== Round of 16 ==
Team 1	Agg.	Team 2	1st leg	2nd leg
Batumi	1–0	Kolkheti Khobi	1–0	0–0
Sapovnela Terjola	w/o	Iberia-Dinamo Tbilisi	0–6	–
Mziuri Gali	2–2 (a)	Guria Lanchkhuti	0–0	2–2
Magharoeli Chiatura	0–4	Kutaisi	0–2	0–2
Tskhumi Sokhumi	3–3 (4–3 p)	Margveti Zestaponi	2–1	1–2
Samtredia Tskaltubo	2–3	Amirani Ochamchire	0–0	2–3
Duruji Kvareli	1–5	Sioni Bolnisi	1–1	0–4
Odishi Zugdidi	w/o	Shevardeni Zugdidi	–	–

== Quarterfinals ==
Team 1	Agg.	Team 2	1st leg	2nd leg
Iberia-Dinamo Tbilisi	3–1	Batumi	0–0	3–1
Mziuri Gali	4–4 (a)	Kutaisi	3–2	1–2
Amirani Ochamchire	2–4	Tskhumi Sokhumi	1–1	1–3 (a.e.t.)
Odishi Zugdidi	2–2 (5–4 p)	Sioni Bolnisi	2–0	0–2

== Semifinals ==
Team 1	Agg.	Team 2	1st leg	2nd leg
Iberia-Dinamo Tbilisi	3–1	Kutaisi	2–0	1–1
Odishi Zugdidi	1–2	Tskhumi Sokhumi	1–1	0–1

== Final ==
26 May 1992

Iberia-Dinamo Tbilisi	3–1	Tskhumi Sokhumi
Inalishvili 33'; Revishvili 54'; Arveladze 60'		Jishkariani 61'

Boris Paichadze Stadium, Tbilisi
Attendance: 18,000
Referee: Malkhaz Kobiashvili (Dusheti)

== See also ==
- 1991–92 Umaglesi Liga
- 1991–92 Pirveli Liga
