= 1990 Georgian Cup =

Tournament details
- Country: Georgia
- Teams: 98

Final positions
- Champions: Guria Lanchkhuti
- Runners-up: Tskhumi Sokhumi

The 1990 Georgian Cup was the forty-seventh season overall and first since independence of the Georgian annual football tournament.

== First qualifying round ==
Team 1	Score	Team 2
Tusheti Kvemo Alvani	2–1	Ertsukhi Tsnori
Trialeti Tsalka	2–3	Algeti Marneuli
Imedi Tbilisi	0–0 (6–7 p)	Rustavi
Mglebi Tbilisi	3–0	Paravani Ninotsminda
Okriba Tkibuli	4–1	Gantiadi Kaspi
Samtskhe Atskuri	2–1	Mamisoni Oni
Chkherimela Kharagauli	0–1	Meskheti Akhaltsikhe
Abuli Akhalkalaki	1–0	Tskhrajvari Tkibuli
Kutaisi-2	4–0	Zarzma Adigeni
Kolkhi Gulripshi	2–1	Guria-2 Lanchkhuti
Kolkheti-2 Khobi	1–7	Imedi Laituri
Lashkindari Tkvarcheli	2–1 (a.e.t.)	Menavtobe Batumi
Chkondidi Martvili	1–1 (4–2 p)	Egrisi Senaki
Krtsanisi Tbilisi	1–0	Samgori Gardabani
Jejili Tbilisi	1–0	Chabukiani
Mretebi Tbilisi	6–1	Eteri Lagodekhi
Gareji Sagarejo	0–2	Dighomi Tbilisi
Shiraki Dedoplistsqaro	0–1 (a.e.t.)	Gantiadi Dmanisi
Sairme Baghdati	2–0	Merani Tbilisi
Tori Borjomi	1–1 (7–6 p)	Vardzia Aspindza
Mukhnari Mukhrani	1–0	Iberia Kareli
Aisi Kutaisi	3–1 (a.e.t.)	Zana Abasha
Betlemi Keda	3–2	Kolkheti-2 Poti
Shevardeni Zugdidi	w/o	Mshenebeli
Samtredia-2	4–1	Subtropiki Sokhumi
Ukimerioni Kutaisi	1–0	Racha Ambrolauri
Gorda Sokhumi	2–3	Mamuli Didi Chkoni
Martve Tbilisi	3–0	Garisi Tetritskaro

== Second qualifying round ==
Team 1	Score	Team 2
Ukimerioni Kutaisi	0–1	Tori Borjomi
GTU Tbilisi	3–2 (a.e.t.)	Napareuli
Tusheti Kvemo Alvani	1–2	Krtsanisi Tbilisi
Algeti Marneuli	1–2	Martve Tbilisi
Rustavi	1–4	Jejili Tbilisi
Dighomi Tbilisi	2–5	Mretebi Tbilisi
Gantiadi Dmanisi	2–1	Mglebi Tbilisi
Okriba Tkibuli	w/o	Samtskhe Atskuri
Kutaisi-2	1–0	Sairme Baghdati
Kolkhi Gulripshi	5–2	Mukhnari Mukhrani
Imedi Laituri	4–1	Lashkindari Tkvarcheli
Aisi Kutaisi	5–0	Chkondidi Martvili
Shevardeni Zugdidi	2–2 (5–6 p)	Betlemi Keda
Mamuli Didi Chkoni	3–2 (a.e.t.)	Samtredia-2
Chela Darcheli	3–2	Bakhmaro Chokhatauri
Meskheti Akhaltsikhe	3–1	Abuli Akhalkalaki

== Third qualifying round ==
Team 1	Score	Team 2
Martve Tbilisi	3–1	Jejili Tbilisi
Krtsanisi Tbilisi	4–0	TGU Tbilisi
Mretebi Tbilisi	8–0	Gantiadi Dmanisi
Okriba Tkibuli	4–0	Meskheti Akhaltsikhe
Tori Borjomi	4–1	Kutaisi-2
Imedi Laituri	2–1	Kolkhi Gulripshi
Betlemi Keda	2–1	Aisi Kutaisi
Mamuli Didi Chkoni	2–1	Chela Darcheli

== Round of 64 ==
Team 1	Agg.	Team 2	1st leg	2nd leg
Martve Tbilisi	5–4	Duruji Kvareli	1–2	4–2
Samegrelo Chkhorotsku	4–3	Pizkulturis Instituti	4–2	0–1
Imedi Laituri	3–4	Sikharuli-90 Gagra	3–2	0–2
Bakhtrioni Akhmeta	2–6	Margveti Zestaponi	2–3	0–3
Mamuli Didi Chkoni	2–0	Chikhura Sachkhere	0–0	2–0
GTU Tbilisi	0–7	Kakheti Telavi	0–3	0–4
Okriba Tbilisi	3–2	Magharoeli Chiatura	3–0	0–2
Krtsanisi Tbilisi	5–3	Aragvi Dusheti	3–2	2–1
Betlemi Keda	4–3	Sapovnela Terjola	4–1	0–2
Kartli Gori	1–3	Alazani Gurjaani	1–2	0–1
Tori Borjomi	w/o	Sioni Bolnisi	0–1	–
Sulori Vani	0–0 (2–3 p)	Imereti Khoni	0–0	0–0 (a.e.t.)
Mretebi Tbilisi	6–4	Shukura Kobuleti	2–4	4–0
Armazi Mtskheta	5–4	Skuri Tsalenjikha	2–0	3–4

== Round of 32 ==
Team 1	Agg.	Team 2	1st leg	2nd leg
Odishi Zugdidi	2–1	Kolkheti Khobi	1–0	1–1
Kutaisi	5–1	Imereti Khoni	3–1	2–0
Sanavardo Samtredia	2–3	Batumi	1–1	1–2
Shevardeni-1906 Tbilisi	5–8	Mziuri Gali	4–3	1–5
Gorda Rustavi	6–0	Iveria Khashuri	4–0	2–0
Margveti Zestaponi	2–4	Guria Lanchkhuti	2–0	0–4
Mertskhali Ozurgeti	6–3	Alazani Gurjaani	5–1	1–2
Kolkheti-1913 Poti	7–2	Betlemi Keda	3–0	4–2
Mretebi Tbilisi	4–3	Liakhvi Tskhinvali	3–1	1–2
Kakheti Telavi	4–4 (0–3 p)	Samgurali Tskaltubo	2–2	2–2 (a.e.t.)
Sioni Bolnisi	2–1	Samegrelo Chkhorotsku	2–0	0–1
Iberia Tbilisi	8–2	Krtsanisi Tbilisi	3–2	5–0
Armazi Mtskheta	1–5	Okriba Tbilisi	1–2	0–3
Amirani Ochamchire	3–4	Tskhumi Sokhumi	2–2	1–2
Dila Gori	10–3	Mamuli Didi Chkoni	7–1	3–2
Martve Tbilisi	2–1	Sikharuli-90 Gagra	1–1	1–0

== Round of 16 ==
Team 1	Agg.	Team 2	1st leg	2nd leg
Mziuri Gali	3–4	Guria Lanchkhuti	1–0	2–4
Odishi Zugdidi	0–2	Batumi	0–0	0–2
Okriba Tbilisi	2–3	Kolkheti-1913 Poti	1–0	1–3
Martve Tbilisi	2–8	Iberia Tbilisi	2–2	0–6
Mertskhali Ozurgeti	5–3	Samgurali Tskaltubo	4–1	1–2
Kutaisi	4–2	Dila Gori	3–0	1–2
Sioni Bolnisi	1–1 (a)	Tskhumi Sokhumi	1–1	0–0
Mretebi Tbilisi	3–3 (a)	Gorda Rustavi	3–1	0–2

== Quarterfinals ==
Team 1	Agg.	Team 2	1st leg	2nd leg
Iberia Tbilisi	7–5	Kolkheti-1913 Poti	3–0	4–5
Gorda Rustavi	2–2 (a)	Tskhumi Sokhumi	2–1	0–1
Guria Lanchkhuti	5–2	Kutaisi	5–1	0–1
Mertskhali Ozurgeti	1–1 (a)	Batumi	1–1	0–0

== Semifinals ==
Team 1	Agg.	Team 2	1st leg	2nd leg
Iberia Tbilisi	0–3	Guria Lanchkhuti	0–1	0–2
Tskhumi Sokhumi	5–0	Batumi	4–0	1–0

== Final ==
18 November 1990

Guria Lanchkhuti	1–0 (a.e.t.)	Tskhumi Sokhumi
Pridonashvili 95'

Boris Paichadze Stadium, Tbilisi
Attendance: 35,000
Referee: Merab Malaghuradze (Tbilisi)

== See also ==
- 1990 Umaglesi Liga
- 1990 Pirveli Liga
