= 1999–2000 Pirveli Liga =

1999–2000 Pirveli Liga was the 11th season of the Georgian Pirveli Liga. In contrast with the previous one where 55 teams were represented, this time a total of 46 teams split into four groups within the western and eastern zones, took part in the competition. The season started on 12 September 1999 and ended on 1 June 2000.

The Pirveli Liga was the second division of Georgian football and consisted of both professional and reserve teams.

== League standings ==
=== East, A zone ===
| Pos | Team | Pld | W | D | L | GF | GA | GD | Pts |
|---|---|---|---|---|---|---|---|---|---|
| 1 | Spartaki | 20 | 15 | 2 | 3 | 47 | 8 | +39 | 47 |
| 2 | Tori | 20 | 15 | 2 | 3 | 41 | 14 | +27 | 47 |
| 3 | Iveria | 20 | 14 | 0 | 6 | 45 | 20 | +25 | 42 |
| 4 | Iberia Academy | 20 | 11 | 2 | 7 | 28 | 18 | +10 | 35 |
| 5 | Meskheti | 20 | 9 | 4 | 7 | 44 | 36 | +8 | 31 |
| 6 | Tskhumi | 20 | 9 | 2 | 9 | 36 | 27 | +9 | 29 |
| 7 | Gantiadi | 20 | 7 | 1 | 12 | 23 | 44 | −21 | 22 |
| 8 | Mretebi | 20 | 5 | 5 | 10 | 20 | 37 | −17 | 20 |
| 9 | Agrarian University | 20 | 6 | 1 | 13 | 24 | 39 | −15 | 19 |
| 10 | Vardzia | 20 | 4 | 2 | 14 | 17 | 55 | −38 | 14 |
| 11 | Aragvi | 20 | 4 | 1 | 15 | 22 | 49 | −27 | 13 |

Source: Soccerway

=== East, B zone ===
| Pos | Team | Pld | W | D | L | GF | GA | GD | Pts |
|---|---|---|---|---|---|---|---|---|---|
| 1 | Locomotive-2 | 20 | 14 | 3 | 3 | 35 | 16 | +19 | 45 |
| 2 | Alazani | 20 | 14 | 2 | 4 | 58 | 20 | +38 | 44 |
| 3 | Arsenali-2 | 20 | 13 | 4 | 3 | 43 | 22 | +21 | 43 |
| 4 | Chabukiani | 20 | 13 | 3 | 4 | 41 | 13 | +28 | 42 |
| 5 | Zooveti | 20 | 10 | 5 | 5 | 40 | 29 | +11 | 35 |
| 6 | Khalibi-97 | 20 | 7 | 3 | 10 | 27 | 33 | −6 | 24 |
| 7 | Amirani | 20 | 7 | 3 | 10 | 31 | 44 | −13 | 24 |
| 8 | ShSS Academy | 20 | 5 | 6 | 9 | 16 | 18 | −2 | 21 |
| 9 | Norchi Dinamoeli | 20 | 4 | 4 | 12 | 21 | 41 | −20 | 16 |
| 10 | Samgori | 20 | 3 | 2 | 15 | 20 | 55 | −35 | 11 |
| 11 | Duruji | 20 | 2 | 1 | 17 | 12 | 53 | −41 | 7 |

Source: Soccerway

=== West, A Zone ===
| Pos | Team | Pld | W | D | L | GF | GA | GD | Pts |
|---|---|---|---|---|---|---|---|---|---|
| 1 | Margveti | 22 | 18 | 4 | 0 | 71 | 18 | +53 | 58 |
| 2 | Okeane | 22 | 13 | 6 | 3 | 51 | 23 | +28 | 45 |
| 3 | Iberia-2 | 22 | 12 | 6 | 4 | 47 | 26 | +21 | 42 |
| 4 | Metalurgi Zestaponi | 22 | 12 | 5 | 5 | 42 | 27 | +15 | 41 |
| 5 | Torpedo-2 | 22 | 9 | 6 | 7 | 34 | 30 | +4 | 33 |
| 6 | Dinamo Gagra | 22 | 6 | 8 | 8 | 31 | 37 | −6 | 26 |
| 7 | Racha | 22 | 6 | 7 | 9 | 31 | 37 | −6 | 25 |
| 8 | Guria | 22 | 7 | 1 | 14 | 36 | 45 | −9 | 22 |
| 9 | Rtsmena | 22 | 5 | 7 | 10 | 16 | 29 | −13 | 22 |
| 10 | Sulori | 22 | 5 | 6 | 11 | 30 | 54 | −24 | 21 |
| 11 | Magaroeli | 22 | 3 | 6 | 13 | 28 | 47 | −19 | 15 |
| 12 | Meshakhte | 22 | 3 | 4 | 15 | 24 | 68 | −44 | 13 |

Source: Soccerway

=== West, B Zone ===
| Pos | Team | Pld | W | D | L | GF | GA | GD | Pts |
|---|---|---|---|---|---|---|---|---|---|
| 1 | Shukura | 22 | 18 | 2 | 2 | 66 | 20 | +46 | 56 |
| 2 | Odishi-2 | 22 | 16 | 3 | 3 | 65 | 21 | +44 | 51 |
| 3 | Megri | 22 | 16 | 2 | 4 | 40 | 17 | +23 | 50 |
| 4 | Kolkheti-2 | 22 | 14 | 4 | 4 | 34 | 15 | +19 | 46 |
| 5 | Lazika | 22 | 12 | 5 | 5 | 56 | 24 | +32 | 41 |
| 6 | Pazisi Poti | 22 | 10 | 3 | 9 | 36 | 37 | −1 | 33 |
| 7 | Skuri | 22 | 6 | 3 | 13 | 26 | 52 | −26 | 21 |
| 8 | Dinamo-2 Batumi | 22 | 4 | 8 | 10 | 26 | 38 | −12 | 20 |
| 9 | Samegrelo | 22 | 5 | 5 | 12 | 23 | 43 | −20 | 20 |
| 10 | Mertskhali | 22 | 3 | 7 | 12 | 20 | 43 | −23 | 16 |
| 11 | Chela | 22 | 2 | 4 | 16 | 19 | 56 | −37 | 10 |
| 12 | Bakhmaro | 22 | 2 | 2 | 18 | 18 | 63 | −45 | 8 |

Source: Soccerway

== See also ==
- 1999–2000 Umaglesi Liga
- 1999–2000 Georgian Cup
