= Badri Kvaratskhelia =

Georgian footballer (born 1965)

Personal information
- Date of birth: 15 February 1965 (age 61)
- Place of birth: Nakipu, Georgian SSR, Soviet Union
- Height: 1.72 m (5 ft 8 in)
- Position: Forward

Senior career*
Years	Team	Apps	(Gls)
1990–1992	Skuri	75	(47)
1992–1993	Dinamo Tbilisi	18	(5)
1993–1994	Kakheti Telavi	12	(4)
1994–1995	Metalurgi Rustavi	15	(1)
1995–1996	SSS Academy	10	(5)
1996–1997	Merani Tbilisi	34	(12)
1997–1998	Kapaz	22	(20)
1998–2005	Shamkir	110	(51)
Total		296	(145)

International career
2000	Azerbaijan	3	(0)

Managerial career
- 2004–2007: Sioni (assistant)
- 2008–2009: Standard Sumgayit (assistant)
- 2009: Standard Sumgayit
- 2011–2012: Spartaki Tskhinvali (assistant)
- 2012–2013: Gabala (assistant)
- 2014: Turan
- 2015: Guria Lanchkhuti
- 2015–2016: Merani Martvili
- 2018: Samtredia
- 2019: Rustavi
- * Club domestic league appearances and goals

Badri Kvaratskhelia (Georgian: ბადრი კვარაცხელია, romanized: badri k'varatskhelia; born 15 February 1965) is a Georgian professional football manager and former player who played as a forward. Born in the Georgian SSR of the Soviet Union, he represented Azerbaijan internationally. He is the father of Khvicha Kvaratskhelia, a current Paris Saint-Germain player.

== Playing career ==
In early 1990s, Kvaratskhelia spent three seasons at his hometown team Skuri in the second tier of the Georgian football league system before he joined reigning top-tier champions Dinamo Tbilisi for one year. In 1997, he moved to Azerbaijani club Kapaz Ganja, who claimed both the league title and the national cup that season.

The next year Kvaratskhelia signed for Shamkir and became the league top scorer in the 1999–2000 season. On 19 July 2000, he scored a hat-trick in a Champions Cup qualifier against Skonto Riga.

In 2000, he made his debut for the Azerbaijan national team in a 0–0 draw against Georgia. Later he played two more international matches.

Kvaratskhelia ended his playing career in 2005 and returned to Georgia.

== Coaching career ==
After completing coaching courses, Kvaratskhelia initially worked as assistant manager at Sioni Bolnisi, who won the league title in 2006. In early 2009, he took over the managerial position at now-defunct Azerbaijani side Standard Sumgayit.

On 22 September 2015, Kvaratskhelia was appointed as the manager of Guria Lanchkhuti. It didn't last for long, because on 6 October 2015, he was then appointed as the manager of Merani Martvili.

In April 2018, Kvaratskhelia became the manager of Samtredia. He resigned at the end of the season. From February until 22 April 2019, he was the manager of Rustavi.

Shortly, due to a heart surgery, Kvaratskhelia had to prematurely retire.

== Personal life ==
Badri is the father of Georgia national team and Paris Saint-Germain FC player Khvicha Kvaratskhelia and also a 16-year old FC Dinamo Tbilisi player Tornike Kvaratskhelia

== Career statistics ==
=== Club ===
Season	Club	League		
Season	Club	League	Matches	Goals
1990	(Georgia (country)) Skuri	Pirveli Liga	33	17
1991	(Georgia (country)) Skuri	Pirveli Liga	14	5
1991–92	(Georgia (country)) Skuri	Pirveli Liga	28	25
1992–93	(Georgia (country)) Dinamo Tbilisi	Umaglesi Liga	18	5
1993–94	(Georgia (country)) Kakheti	Umaglesi Liga	12	4
1994–95	(Georgia (country)) Metalurgi Rustavi	Umaglesi Liga	15	1
1995–96	(Georgia (country)) SSS-Akademia	Pirveli Liga	10	5
1996–97	(Georgia (country)) Merani Tbilisi	Umaglesi Liga	28	11
1997–98	(Georgia (country)) Merani Tbilisi	Umaglesi Liga	6	1
1997–98	(Azerbaijan) Kapaz Ganja	Top League	22	20
1998–99	(Azerbaijan) Shamkir	Top League	31	14
1999–2000	(Azerbaijan) Shamkir	Top League	21	16
2000–01	(Azerbaijan) Shamkir	Top League	15	7
2001–02	(Azerbaijan) Shamkir	Top League	21	7
2003–04	(Azerbaijan) Shamkir	Top League	11	5
2004–05	(Azerbaijan) Shamkir	Top League	11	2

=== International ===
Appearances and goals by national team and year
National team	Year	Apps	Goals
Azerbaijan	2000	3	0
Total		3	0

== Honours ==
Dinamo Tbilisi

- Umaglesi Liga: 1992–93

Kapaz

- Azerbaijan Top League: 1997–98
- Azerbaijan Cup: 1997–98

Shamkir

- Azerbaijan Top League: 1999–2000, 2000–01, 2001–02
- Azerbaijan Cup runner-up: 1998–99, 2001–02, 2003–04

Individual

- Azerbaijan Top League top scorer: 1999–2000
