= 1992–93 Umaglesi Liga =

Umaglesi Liga
- Season: 1992–93
- Dates: 9 August 1992 – 21 June 1993
- Champions: Dinamo Tbilisi; 4th Georgian title
- Relegated: Tskhumi Sokhumi
- Champions League: Dinamo Tbilisi
- Matches played: 272
- Goals scored: 938 (3.45 per match)
- Top goalscorer: Merab Megreladze (41)
- Biggest home win: Dinamo 12–4 Metalurgi
- Biggest away win: Mretebi 0–5 Dinamo
- Highest scoring: Dinamo 12–4 Metalurgi

The 1992–93 Umaglesi Liga was the fourth season of top-tier football in Georgia. It began on 9 August 1992 and ended on 21 June 1993. Dinamo Tbilisi were the defending champions.

== Locations ==
Location of teams in 1992–93 Umaglesi Liga

== League standings ==
Pos	Team	Pld	W	D	L	GF	GA	GD	Pts	Qualification or relegation
1	Dinamo Tbilisi (C)	32	25	2	5	92	35	+57	77	Qualification for the Champions League preliminary round
2	Shevardeni-1906 Tbilisi	32	20	4	8	66	39	+27	64	
3	Alazani Gurjaani	32	20	3	9	70	47	+23	63	
4	Samgurali Tskaltubo	32	18	4	10	73	51	+22	58	
5	Torpedo Kutaisi	32	16	4	12	66	53	+13	52	
6	Margveti Zestaponi	32	15	5	12	49	54	−5	50	
7	Metalurgi Rustavi	32	14	7	11	73	69	+4	49	
8	Kakheti Telavi	32	14	3	15	50	59	−9	45	
9	Kolkheti-1913 Poti	32	12	6	14	47	45	+2	42	
10	Lokomotivi Samtredia	32	12	4	16	33	49	−16	40	
11	Batumi	32	11	6	15	56	56	0	39	
12	Guria Lanchkhuti	32	12	2	18	37	57	−20	38	
13	Dila Gori	32	11	5	16	39	49	−10	38	
14	Odishi Zugdidi	32	11	3	18	52	64	−12	36	
15	Iveria Khashuri	32	10	4	18	38	63	−25	34	
16	Mretebi Tbilisi	32	10	3	19	38	64	−26	33	
17	Tskhumi Sokhumi (Note: Apparently withdrew due to Abkhazia status) (R)	32	8	1	23	59	84	−25	25	Withdrew from the league

Source: rsssf.org
Rules for classification: 1st points; 2nd matches won; 3rd head-to-head
(C) Champions; (R) Relegated

== Results ==
Home \ Away	ALA	BAT	DIL	DIN	GUR	IKH	KTL	KOL	LSA	MZS	MET	MRE	ODI	SHE	SMG	TKU	TSK
Alazani Gurjaani		4–3	2–1	5–3	1–0	1–0	6–2	3–0 (Note: Match awarded.)	3–0	3–1	2–0	2–2	1–0	3–0	4–2	3–0	4–3
Batumi	0–1		4–0	1–2	1–0	4–0	3–1	1–2	1–1	4–1	3–3	0–3	3–1	1–0	1–1	2–4	2–3
Dila Gori	1–1	1–1		0–1	3–1	3–0	2–2	2–1	2–0	1–1	4–0	0–0	3–1	0–1	2–0	1–0	1–0
Dinamo Tbilisi	4–1	2–0	2–0		6–0	4–0	1–0	4–0	3–0	2–0	12–4	1–2	1–0	3–1	2–2	4–1	1–0
Guria Lanchkhuti	2–0	1–2	3–0	1–2		2–1	0–0	1–0	1–1	1–0	2–4	4–2	3–0	3–2	0–2	2–1	3–2
Iveria Khashuri	1–2	2–0	2–1	1–4	3–1		3–1	0–1	2–0	0–0	5–3	6–1	3–1	0–3	1–0	1–1	0–3
Kakheti Telavi	1–0	1–0	3–0	3–4	2–0	5–1		1–0	1–0	4–1	1–0	2–3	3–2	1–2	1–1	2–0	2–1
Kolkheti-1913 Poti	3–2	4–3	5–1	0–2	3–1	0–0	4–0		4–0	1–1	0–3	2–0	2–2	2–1	2–1	1–1	5–1
Lokomotivi Samtredia	1–4	3–0	2–0	1–2	2–0	1–0	1–2	2–1		1–0	1–1	3–2	1–0	1–1	2–0	2–1	2–1
Margveti Zestaponi	1–0	3–2	0–3	1–1	1–0	3–0	6–2	2–1	3–2		1–0	0–3	4–2	1–1	4–3	2–0	2–1
Metalurgi Rustavi	1–1	1–1	2–0	0–4	3–1	2–2	5–2	2–0	3–1	5–0		7–0	2–1	2–1	5–4	3–1	4–4
Mretebi Tbilisi	0–1	0–1	4–2	0–5	2–3	0–1	1–2	2–1	3–0	0–1	1–3		1–0	1–0	0–2	0–0	3–1
Odishi Zugdidi	2–1	3–3	1–0	3–2	2–0	2–0	1–0	3–2	2–0	2–1	1–1	1–2		0–2	2–3	5–4	3–0
Shevardeni-1906 Tbilisi	3–1	3–2	3–1	3–1	4–1	4–0	1–0	0–0	1–0	3–0	3–2	2–1	6–2		0–0	5–3	4–1
Samgurali Tskaltubo	2–1	3–1	2–1	1–2	3–0	3–1	3–1	2–0	2–1	2–3	5–1	3–2	5–1	4–1		4–3	5–4
Torpedo Kutaisi	4–2	4–1	4–1	2–1	3–0	2–1	3–0	0–0	3–0	3–2	3–0	3–0	3–2	1–2	1–0		6–3
Tskhumi Sokhumi	4–5	1–2	0–2	2–4	0–1	4–1	4–2	1–0	0–1	1–3	2–1	2–0	6–4	1–3	1–3	2–5	

Source: globalsportsarchive.com
Legend: Blue = home team win; Yellow = draw; Red = away team win.

== Top goalscorers ==
Rank	Goalscorer	Team	Goals
1	(Georgia (country)) Merab Megreladze	Samgurali Tskaltubo	41
2	(Georgia (country)) Mikheil Jishkariani	Tskhumi Sokhumi	23
2	(Georgia (country)) Otar Korgalidze	Alazani Gurjaani	23
4	(Georgia (country)) Ivane Jugheli	Margveti Zestaponi	22
4	(Georgia (country)) Levan Khomeriki	Batumi	22
6	(Georgia (country)) Mamuka Khundadze	Torpedo Kutaisi	19
7	(Georgia (country)) Shota Arveladze	Dinamo Tbilisi	18
8	(Georgia (country)) Varlam Kilasonia	Metalurgi Rustavi	17
9	(Georgia (country)) Gela Inalishvili	Dinamo Tbilisi	16
10	(Georgia (country)) Giorgi Daraselia	Torpedo Kutaisi	15
10	(Georgia (country)) Davit Janashia	Torpedo Kutaisi	15

== See also ==
- 1992–93 Pirveli Liga
- 1992–93 Georgian Cup
