= 1990 Pirveli Liga =

1990 Pirveli Liga was the first season of the Georgian Pirveli Liga. The Pirveli Liga is the second division of Georgian Football. It consists of reserve teams and professional teams.

== League standings ==
Pos	Team	Pld	W	D	L	GF	GA	GD	Pts	Promotion
1	Sulori (C, P)	38	28	4	6	92	56	+36	88	Promotion to Umaglesi Liga
2	Margveti (P)	38	28	3	7	102	44	+58	87	Promotion to Umaglesi Liga
3	Aalazani (P)	38	26	5	7	83	38	+45	83	Promotion to Umaglesi Liga
4	Kakheti	38	19	7	12	68	47	+21	64	
5	Aragvi	38	15	13	10	57	54	+3	58	
6	Sikharuli-90 Gagra	38	16	5	17	67	55	+12	53	
7	Imereti	38	14	9	15	51	64	−13	51	
8	Kartli Gori	38	15	5	18	64	64	0	50	
9	Shukura	38	12	13	13	56	62	−6	49	
10	Skuri	38	14	6	18	72	73	−1	48	
11	Magaroeli	38	14	6	18	60	72	−12	48	
12	Sapovnela	38	14	6	18	50	55	−5	48	
13	Chikhura	38	14	6	18	55	66	−11	48	
14	Sioni	38	12	9	17	81	85	−4	45	
15	Armazi Mtskheta	38	12	9	17	50	70	−20	45	
16	Bakhtrioni Akhmeta	38	12	9	17	53	72	−19	45	
17	Samegrelo	38	10	14	14	49	54	−5	44	
18	Duruji	38	13	4	21	57	67	−10	43	
19	Inst.Fiskultury	38	9	9	20	39	65	−26	36	
20	STU	38	11	2	25	52	95	−43	35	

Source: rsssf.org
(C) Champions; (P) Promoted

== See also ==
- 1990 Umaglesi Liga
- 1990 Georgian Cup
