= 1991–92 Umaglesi Liga =

Umaglesi Liga
- Season: 1991–92
- Dates: 15 August 1991 – 20 June 1992
- Champions: Iberia-Dinamo Tbilisi; 3rd Georgian title
- Relegated: Mziuri Gali; Kolkheti Khobi; Amirani Ochamchire; Sulori Vani; Mertskhali Ozurgeti
- Matches played: 380
- Goals scored: 1,206 (3.17 per match)
- Top goalscorer: Otar Korgalidze (40)
- Biggest home win: Tskhumi 11–0 Mertskhali
- Biggest away win: Sulori 0–5 Iberia-Dinamo
- Highest scoring: Tskhumi 11–0 Mertskhali; Iberia-Dinamo 10–1 Sulori

The 1991–92 Umaglesi Liga was the third season of top-tier football in Georgia. It began on 15 August 1991 and ended on 20 June 1992. The season was a first under the autumn-spring schedule. Dinamo Tbilisi (changed the name from Iberia Tbilisi in mid-season) were the defending champions.

== Locations ==
Location of teams in 1991–92 Umaglesi Liga

== League standings ==
Pos	Team	Pld	W	D	L	GF	GA	GD	Pts	Relegation
1	Iberia-Dinamo Tbilisi (C)	38	27	6	5	115	41	+74	87	
2	Tskhumi Sokhumi	38	24	4	10	96	53	+43	76	
3	Gorda Rustavi	38	22	9	7	71	38	+33	75	
4	Guria Lanchkhuti	38	22	3	13	89	56	+33	69	
5	Kolkheti-1913 Poti	38	15	11	12	49	45	+4	56	
6	Odishi Zugdidi	38	16	6	16	56	56	0	54	
7	Mziuri Gali (Note: Apparently withdrew due to War in Abkhazia) (R)	38	16	5	17	53	65	−12	53	Withdrew from the league
8	Margveti Zestaponi	38	14	11	13	60	58	+2	53	
9	Batumi	38	15	6	17	55	58	−3	51	
10	Dila Gori	38	14	8	16	64	64	0	50	
11	Kutaisi	38	15	4	19	66	60	+6	49	
12	Samgurali Tskaltubo	38	14	6	18	41	55	−14	48	
13	Mretebi Tbilisi	38	13	9	16	48	51	−3	48 (Note: Head-to-head points: Mretebi Tbilisi 6, Kolkheti Khobi 5 (away goals scored 2), Samtredia 5 (away goals scored 1).)	
14	Kolkheti Khobi (Note: Apparently withdrew) (R)	38	13	9	16	57	66	−9	48	Withdrew from the league
15	Samtredia	38	13	9	16	55	62	−7	48	
16	Shevardeni-1906 Tbilisi	38	14	5	19	56	72	−16	47	
17	Amirani Ochamchire (R)	38	13	8	17	48	56	−8	47 (Note: Head-to-head record: Amirani Ochamchire–Alazani Gurjaani 0–0, Alazani Gurjaani–Amirani Ochamchire 1–1.)	Withdrew from the league
18	Alazani Gurjaani	38	13	8	17	45	70	−25	47	
19	Sulori Vani (R)	38	13	7	18	53	82	−29	46	Relegation to Pirveli Liga
20	Mertskhali Ozurgeti (R)	38	4	6	28	29	98	−69	18	Relegation to Pirveli Liga

Source: rsssf.org
Rules for classification: 1st points; 2nd matches won; 3rd head-to-head
(C) Champions; (R) Relegated

== Results ==
Home \ Away	ALA	AMI	BAT	DIL	GOR	GUR	IBD	KKH	KOL	KUT	MZS	MRT	MRE	MZI	ODI	SMG	SAM	SHE	SUL	TSK
Alazani Gurjaani		0–0	2–0	4–2	1–0	0–1	0–1	1–1	2–1	3–2	1–1	4–1	4–2	1–0	4–3	2–1	2–0	1–0	1–0	1–4
Amirani Ochamchire	1–1		2–1	2–0	0–1	3–1	1–3	4–1	1–0	1–0	0–1	5–0	1–1	2–2	2–1	1–1	3–2	1–0	4–2	0–0
Batumi	6–0	2–1		1–0	1–1	2–1	1–3	2–0	1–1	0–4	3–1	7–0	0–0	1–0	2–1	5–2	4–0	1–1	0–0	1–0
Dila Gori	2–0	2–1	3–0 (Note: Match awarded.)		1–1	1–1	2–2	3–2	3–0	4–2	1–0	2–1	1–2	4–1	6–2	0–0	2–0	5–2	5–2	1–1
Gorda Rustavi	7–3	2–1	3–1	1–0		1–0	1–2	0–0	1–0	2–1	3–1	3–1	0–1	5–0	2–0	5–2	2–1	4–3	6–1	1–0
Guria Lanchkhuti	2–0	5–1	4–0	5–1	4–1		2–1	2–0	3–0	3–1	2–1	8–2	1–2	2–0	4–1	2–0	5–1	7–3	3–2	2–2
Iberia-Dinamo Tbilisi	4–1	8–2	0–0	4–1	3–1	4–2		1–0	0–1	4–1	6–1	2–0	1–0	7–3	7–2	3–0	3–0	3–2	10–1	5–1
Kolkheti Khobi	2–2	3–1	5–0	2–2	0–0	3–2	2–4		4–2	2–1	3–1	3–1	1–0	1–0	1–4	2–0	1–1	3–1	3–1	4–3
Kolkheti-1913 Poti	0–0	3–1	2–3	4–0	1–1	1–0	2–2	6–1		2–1	1–0	3–1	1–2	2–1	1–0	1–0	2–1	2–2	1–1	2–1
Kutaisi	4–0	1–0	2–0	2–1	0–1	2–1	0–3	1–0	1–1		0–0	2–0	2–1	5–0	3–0	5–2	5–3	3–0	4–1	1–3
Margveti Zestaponi	3–0	2–1	5–4	4–3	2–2	0–0	0–0	1–1	2–1	0–0		0–0	5–0	4–2	4–2	1–0	3–1	1–0	3–1	3–0
Mertskhali Ozurgeti	1–0	1–1	1–2	0–3	0–4	0–2	1–4	0–0	1–2	1–0	1–1		1–1	2–0	0–0	1–2	2–4	3–0	0–1	2–4
Mretebi Tbilisi	1–1	1–2	2–1	1–1	1–2	0–3	0–1	2–0	3–1	2–1	1–1	1–0		5–0	2–2	0–0	2–0	1–1	2–0	2–4
Mziuri Gali	3–0	1–0	1–0	1–0	0–0	1–2	2–2	2–0	1–1	6–2	2–1	3–1	1–0		2–1	2–1	1–0	2–1	0–0	7–2
Odishi Zugdidi	5–2	1–0	1–0	2–0	0–1	3–0	1–0	2–1	0–0	2–2	2–1	3–0	3–0	0–1		0–0	2–1	2–1	3–0	2–0
Samgurali Tskaltubo	2–0	0–1	0–1	3–1	0–0	1–0	2–1	3–0	0–1	2–1	3–2	2–1	0–4	2–1	2–0		1–3	2–0	2–0	2–1
Samtredia	1–0	0–0	3–0	1–1	1–1	4–2	1–1	2–2	1–0	2–1	4–1	3–0	1–0	2–0	0–0	0–0		2–0	1–0	2–3
Shevardeni-1906 Tbilisi	2–0	1–0	2–1	1–0	2–1	1–2	4–3	2–0	0–0	4–3	3–1	2–1	3–2	1–2	2–1	2–1	3–3		4–2	0–1
Sulori Vani	1–1	2–1	2–1	1–0	1–3	4–3	0–5	2–1	0–0	1–0	1–1	3–1	2–0	3–1	1–2	2–0	4–1	3–0		4–4
Tskhumi Sokhumi	3–0	3–0	2–0	5–0	2–1	6–0	0–2	4–2	3–0	2–0	3–1	11–0	2–1	2–1	1–0	3–0	3–2	2–0	5–1	

Source: globalsportsarchive.com
Legend: Blue = home team win; Yellow = draw; Red = away team win.

== Top goalscorers ==
Rank	Goalscorer	Team	Goals
1	(Georgia (country)) Otar Korgalidze	Guria Lanchkhuti	40
2	(Georgia (country)) Mikheil Jishkariani	Tskhumi Sokhumi	35
3	(Georgia (country)) Ivane Jugheli	Margveti Zestaponi	27
4	(Georgia (country)) Kakhaber Kacharava	Dinamo Tbilisi	26
5	(Georgia (country)) Shota Arveladze	Iberia-Dinamo Tbilisi	22
6	(Georgia (country)) Jimsher Verulashvili	Sulori Vani	21
6	(Georgia (country)) Mikheil Kavelashvili	Iberia-Dinamo Tbilisi	21

== See also ==
- 1991–92 Pirveli Liga
- 1991–92 Georgian Cup
