= 1996–97 Umaglesi Liga =

Umaglesi Liga
- Season: 1996–97
- Dates: 1 August 1996 – 30 May 1997
- Champions: Dinamo Tbilisi; 8th Georgian title
- Relegated: Samtredia; Kakheti Telavi; Iveria Khashuri
- Champions League: Dinamo Tbilisi
- UEFA Cup: Kolkheti Poti
- Cup Winners' Cup: Dinamo Batumi
- Intertoto Cup: Merani-91 Tbilisi
- Matches played: 240
- Goals scored: 648 (2.7 per match)
- Top goalscorer: Giorgi Demetradze; David Ujmajuridze (26)
- Biggest home win: Dinamo Tbilisi 8–0 Margveti
- Biggest away win: Margveti 0–6 Dinamo Tbilisi
- Highest scoring: Dinamo Tbilisi 8–2 Kakheti

The 1996–97 Umaglesi Liga was the eighth season of top-tier football in Georgia. It began on 1 August 1996 and ended on 30 May 1997. Dinamo Tbilisi were the defending champions.

== Location ==
Location of teams in 1996–97 Umaglesi Liga

== League standings ==
Pos	Team	Pld	W	D	L	GF	GA	GD	Pts	Qualification or relegation
1	Dinamo Tbilisi (C)	30	26	3	1	101	23	+78	81	Qualification for the Champions League first qualifying round
2	Kolkheti-1913 Poti	30	20	4	6	75	28	+47	64	Qualification for the UEFA Cup first qualifying round
3	Dinamo Batumi	30	18	8	4	71	22	+49	62	Qualification for the Cup Winners' Cup qualifying round
4	Merani-91 Tbilisi	30	18	6	6	53	28	+25	60	Qualification for the Intertoto Cup group stage
5	Torpedo Kutaisi	30	14	4	12	70	58	+12	46	
6	Odishi Zugdidi	30	13	1	16	51	57	−6	40	
7	Margveti Zestaponi	30	12	2	16	44	66	−22	38	
8	Dila Gori	30	10	7	13	30	39	−9	37	
9	Sioni Bolnisi	30	10	6	14	30	39	−9	36	
10	Metalurgi Rustavi	30	11	2	17	44	57	−13	35	
11	Samgurali Tskaltubo	30	10	5	15	35	54	−19	35	
12	TSU Tbilisi	30	8	10	12	37	40	−3	34	
13	Guria Lanchkhuti	30	10	3	17	33	63	−30	33	
14	Samtredia (Note: 5 points deducted) (R)	30	9	4	17	31	57	−26	26	Relegation to Pirveli Liga
15	Kakheti Telavi (R)	30	10	1	19	29	66	−37	26	Relegation to Pirveli Liga
16	Iveria Khashuri (R)	30	5	6	19	24	61	−37	21	Relegation to Pirveli Liga

Source: rsssf.org
Rules for classification: 1st points; 2nd matches won; 3rd head-to-head
(C) Champions; (R) Relegated

== Results ==
Home \ Away	DIL	DBA	DIN	GUR	IKH	KTL	KOL	MZS	MER	MET	ODI	SMG	SAM	SIO	TKU	TSU
Dila Gori		0–0	0–1	0–0	0–0	3–0	1–0	4–3	1–2	2–0	2–0	3–1	1–0	1–0	3–2	2–1
Dinamo Batumi	5–0		0–1	7–0	4–0	6–0	1–0	4–1	3–0	4–1	1–0	4–0	3–0	2–0	3–1	1–0
Dinamo Tbilisi	4–0	3–3		2–0	8–2	2–0	2–0	8–0	3–2	1–0	5–0	6–0	6–0	4–0	3–3	5–1
Guria Lanchkhuti	3–2	0–5	1–4		1–0	3–0	0–1	3–1	0–1	5–4	2–0	1–2	2–2	1–0	2–0	0–1
Iveria Khashuri	0–0	0–0	0–1	2–0		0–2	2–6	1–2	3–4	2–3	0–0	0–0	2–1	0–0	1–4	2–1
Kakheti Telavi	1–0	1–1	2–5	4–2	1–0		1–3	0–1	1–0	2–0	4–2	3–2	1–0	2–0	1–2	0–1
Kolkheti-1913 Poti	1–1	3–2	2–0	7–0	1–0	4–0		7–0	0–1	1–0	6–1	4–0	6–2	4–0	3–2	1–1
Margveti Zestaponi	2–1	1–3	0–6	2–0	1–2	3–0	0–1		3–0	3–0	1–2	2–1	4–1	4–0	2–0	0–0
Merani-91 Tbilisi	1–0	0–0	0–0	0–0	4–1	5–0	4–0	4–0		4–1	2–1	2–1	3–1	0–0	3–1	4–2
Metalurgi Rustavi	1–0	0–1	2–6	1–2	2–0	3–0	2–4	2–1	0–1		5–2	2–1	2–0	2–0	3–1	3–0
Odishi Zugdidi	2–1	1–3	1–3	4–2	3–1	3–0	4–1	3–1	0–2	5–1		2–1	2–1	2–0	5–0	2–0
Samgurali Tskaltubo	2–1	2–2	0–1	1–0	0–1	3–1	0–0	4–1	1–1	3–0	2–1		2–1	1–0	2–1	1–1
Samtredia	1–0	0–0	0–2	1–2	3–1	2–1	0–0	0–2	1–0	1–0	2–1	4–1		1–0	3–1	2–2
Sioni Bolnisi	0–0	3–0	1–2	2–1	3–1	2–0	0–3 (Note: Match awarded (originally finished 2–1).)	4–1	1–1	1–1	1–0	0–0	5–1		2–4	2–0
Torpedo Kutaisi	5–0	3–2	2–4	3–0	3–0	6–1	1–4	5–2	2–0	4–3	4–1	3–1	3–0	1–1		1–1
TSU Tbilisi	1–1	1–1	1–3	4–0	3–1	2–0	0–2	0–0	1–2	0–0	3–1	5–0	2–0	0–1	2–2	

Source: rsssf.org
Legend: Blue = home team win; Yellow = draw; Red = away team win.

== Top goalscorers ==
Rank	Goalscorer	Team	Goals
1	(Georgia (country)) David Ujmajuridze	Dinamo Batumi	26
1	(Georgia (country)) Giorgi Demetradze	Dinamo Tbilisi	26
3	(Georgia (country)) Mikheil Ashvetia	Torpedo Kutaisi	24
4	(Georgia (country)) Vladimir Gabedava	Odishi Zugdidi	18
4	(Georgia (country)) Levan Khomeriki	Dinamo Tbilisi	18
6	(Georgia (country)) Giorgi Daraselia	Kolkheti-1913 Poti	15
7	(Georgia (country)) Merab Megreladze	Torpedo Kutaisi	13
7	(Georgia (country)) Nugzar Mikaberidze	Kolkheti-1913 Poti	13
9	(Georgia (country)) Badri Kvaratskhelia	Merani-91 Tbilisi	11
9	(Georgia (country)) Mamuka Ukleba	Margveti Zestaponi	11
9	(Georgia (country)) Rostom Torgashvili	Dinamo Batumi	11

== See also ==
- 1996–97 Pirveli Liga
- 1996–97 Georgian Cup
