= 1991 Pirveli Liga =

1991 Pirveli Liga season was the second edition of the 2nd tier Pirveli Liga football competition in Georgia. It consists of reserve teams and professional teams.

== League standings ==
Pos	Team	Pld	W	D	L	GF	GA	GD	Pts	Qualification or relegation
1	Mretebi Tbilisi (C, P)	17	13	0	4	31	12	+19	39	Qualification for Promotion play-offs
2	Kakheti Telavi	17	12	2	3	43	18	+25	38	
3	Okriba Tkibuli	17	9	2	6	22	17	+5	29	
4	Shukura Kobuleti	17	9	2	6	27	14	+13	29	
5	Aragvi Dusheti	17	8	3	6	30	21	+9	27	
6	Sapovnela Terjola	17	8	3	6	22	21	+1	27	
7	Samegrelo Chkhorotsku	17	7	4	6	15	19	−4	25	
8	Imereti Khoni	17	7	3	7	19	22	−3	24	
9	Egrisi Senaki	17	7	3	7	18	23	−5	24	
10	Skuri Tsalenjikha	17	6	6	5	25	27	−2	24	
11	Kartli Gori	17	7	2	8	21	17	+4	23	
12	Armazi Mtskheta	17	7	2	8	21	23	−2	23	
13	Duruji Kvareli	17	7	1	9	16	21	−5	22	
14	Inst.Fizkuktury	17	6	2	9	18	29	−11	20	
15	STU Tbilisi (R)	17	6	2	9	28	34	−6	20	Relegation to Meore Liga
16	Bakhtrioni Ahmeta (R)	17	5	2	10	23	26	−3	17	Relegation to Meore Liga
17	Sikharuli 90 Gagra (R)	17	3	5	9	17	31	−14	14	Relegation to Meore Liga
18	Sioni Bolnisi (R)	17	1	6	10	14	35	−21	9	Relegation to Meore Liga

Source: rsssf.org
(C) Champions; (P) Promoted; (R) Relegated

== Promotion/relegation playoffs ==
Iveria Khashuri - Mretebi Tbilisi - 2-3 (aet)

== See also ==
- 1991 Umaglesi Liga
