= 1999–2000 Georgian Cup =

Tournament details
- Country: Georgia
- Teams: 48

Final positions
- Champions: Locomotive Tbilisi
- Runners-up: Torpedo Kutaisi

The 1999–2000 Georgian Cup (also known as the David Kipiani Cup) was the fifty-sixth season overall and tenth since independence of the Georgian annual football tournament.

== Preliminary round ==
Team 1	Score	Team 2
Iveria Khashuri	7–0	Meskheti Akhaltsikhe
Kvareli	0–2	Chabukiani
Tskhinvali	4–1	Gantiadi Kaspi
Arsenali-2 Tbilisi	1–2	SA Iberia Tbilisi
Locomotive-2 Tbilisi	5–1	SAU Tbilisi
Zooveti Tbilisi	12–0	Alazani Gurjaani
Vardzia Aspindza	0–2	Tori Borjomi
Tskhumi Sokhumi	3–5	SSS-Akademia Tbilisi
Kolkheti-2 Poti	1–4	Shukura Kobuleti
Guria Lanchkhuti	2–0	Koleji Batumi
Interi Kutaisi	0–1	Margveti Zestaponi
Metalurgi Zestaponi	5–2	Magharoeli Chiatura
Dinamo Gagra	2–3	Okeane Samtredia
Megri Zugdidi	2–1	Skuri Tsalenjikha
Sulori Vani	0–5	Iberia-2 Samtredia
Samegrelo Chkhorotsku	2–1	Lazika Zugdidi

== Round of 32 ==
Team 1	Agg.	Team 2	1st leg	2nd leg
Torpedo Kutaisi	11–0	Samegrelo Chkhorotsku	7–0	4–0
Samgurali Tskaltubo	2–4	Iberia-2 Samtredia	0–2	2–2
Dinamo Batumi	3–0	Okeane Samtredia	2–0	1–0
Kolkheti-1913 Poti	12–1	Shukura Kobuleti	6–0	6–1
Iberia Samtredia	1–2	Margveti Zestaponi	1–0	0–2
Kolkheti Khobi	3–4	Guria Lanchkhuti	3–1	0–3
Dila Gori	4–2	Megri Zugdidi	4–1	0–1
TSU Tbilisi	6–3	Metalurgi Zestaponi	1–1	5–2
Dinamo Tbilisi	12–0	Tori Borjomi	5–0	7–0
Chabukiani	1–4	FC Tbilisi	0–1	1–3
WIT Georgia	6–4	SA Iberia Tbilisi	4–1	2–3
Sioni Bolnisi	2–2 (a)	Zooveti Tbilisi	1–2	1–0
Locomotive Tbilisi	8–1	Locomotive-2 Tbilisi	5–0	3–1
Merani-91 Tbilisi	2–0	Tskhinvali	1–0	1–0
Arsenali Tbilisi	0–1	SSS-Akademia Tbilisi	0–0	0–1
Gorda Rustavi	w/o	Iveria Khashuri	–	–

== Round of 16 ==
Team 1	Agg.	Team 2	1st leg	2nd leg
Torpedo Kutaisi	7–0	SSS-Akademia Tbilisi	5–0	2–0
Locomotive Tbilisi	2–1	FC Tbilisi	1–1	1–0
Kolkheti-1913 Poti	1–0	Merani-91 Tbilisi	1–0	0–0
Dinamo Batumi	3–1	Gorda Rustavi	2–0	1–1
WIT Georgia	6–2	TSU Tbilisi	1–1	5–1
Margveti Zestaponi	2–4	Samgurali Tskaltubo	0–2	2–2
Dila Gori	5–1	Zooveti Tbilisi	3–0	2–1
Dinamo Tbilisi	9–0	Guria Lanchkhuti	6–0	3–0

== Quarter-finals ==
The matches were played on 15 March (first legs) and 22 March 2000 (second legs).

Team 1	Agg.	Team 2	1st leg	2nd leg
Dinamo Tbilisi	8–1	Dila Gori	4–0	4–1
Samgurali Tskaltubo	0–2	Torpedo Kutaisi	0–0	0–2
WIT Georgia	0–0 (1–3 p)	Locomotive Tbilisi	0–0	0–0 (a.e.t.)
Dinamo Batumi	3–0	Kolkheti-1913 Poti	3–0	0–0

== Semi-finals ==
The matches were played on 2 May (first legs) and 9 May 2000 (second legs).

Team 1	Agg.	Team 2	1st leg	2nd leg
Dinamo Tbilisi	1–1	Torpedo Kutaisi	1–1	0–0
Locomotive Tbilisi	2–1	Dinamo Batumi	2–0	0–1

== Final ==
26 May 2000

Locomotive Tbilisi	0–0 (a.e.t.)	Torpedo Kutaisi
Penalties
Gogichaishvili (penalty scored); Balashvili (penalty scored); Jishkariani (penalty scored); Khizanishvili (penalty scored)	4–2	(penalty scored) Asatiani; (penalty scored) Kvetenadze; (penalty missed) Chkhetiani; (penalty missed) Shekriladze

Boris Paichadze Stadium, Tbilisi
Attendance: 10,000
Referee: Sergo Kvaratskhelia (Zugdidi)

== See also ==
- 1999–2000 Umaglesi Liga
