= Mamuka Pantsulaia =

Georgian footballer (1967–2019)

Personal information
- Full name: Mamuka Pantsulaia
- Date of birth: 9 October 1967
- Place of birth: Tbilisi, Georgian SSR, Soviet Union
- Date of death: 26 February 2019 (aged 51)
- Place of death: Georgia
- Height: 1.78 m (5 ft 10 in)
- Position: Forward

Youth career
- –1984: Dinamo Tbilisi

Senior career*
Years	Team	Apps	(Gls)
1985–1989	Dinamo Tbilisi	40	(4)
1989	Torpedo Kutaisi	11	(5)
1990–1993	Gorda/Metallurgi Rustavi	70	(38)
1993–1994	Shevardeni-1906 Tbilisi	13	(6)
1996–1997	Odishi Zugdidi	18	(7)
Total		152	(60)

International career
- Soviet Union U16
1990	Georgia	1	(0)

Managerial career
- Olimpi Rustavi (youth)
- * Club domestic league appearances and goals

Mamuka Pantsulaia (Georgian: მამუკა ფანცულაია; 9 October 1967 – 26 February 2019) was a Georgian footballerer who played as a forward and made one appearance for the Georgia.

== Career ==
Pantsulaia played for the Soviet Union under-16 national team in 1985, helping the team win the 1985 with two goals in the final. He was named the tournament's best player. He scored 8 goals in 17 matches for Soviet youth teams. He earned his only cap for the Georgia on 27 May 1990 in the country's first international match, a friendly against Lithuania. He started the match but was substituted at half-time for Gocha Gogrichiani. The home fixture, played in Tbilisi, finished as a 2–2 draw.

Pantsulaia played for Dinamo Tbilisi in the Soviet Top League from 1985 to 1989, and for Torpedo Kutaisi in the Soviet First League in 1989. Georgia established its own league, the Umaglesi Liga, in 1990 after the founding of the Georgian Football Federation. Pantsulaia played in the new league for Olimpi Rustavi (originally Gorda Rustavi), Shevardeni-1906 Tbilisi and Odishi Zugdidi. He was the top scorer, along with Gia Guruli, of the 1990, scoring 23 goals. In 1991, he received a one-year suspension after arguing with a referee.

After retiring from playing, he became a coach at the Olimpi Rustavi youth academy, helping train players such as Tornike Okriashvili.

== Personal life ==
Pantsulaia's son, Giorgi, is also a footballer and played for Georgia youth national teams. Pantsulaia died on 26 February 2019.

== Career statistics ==
=== International ===
Georgia
Year	Apps	Goals
1990	1	0
Total	1	0

== Honours ==
Soviet Union U16

- UEFA European Under-16 Championship: 1985

Individual

- UEFA European Under-16 Championship player of the tournament: 1985
- Master of Sport of the USSR: 1985
- Umaglesi Liga top scorer: 1990
