= 1990 Umaglesi Liga =

Umaglesi Liga
- Season: 1990
- Dates: 30 March 1990 – 12 November 1990
- Champions: Iberia Tbilisi; 1st Georgian title
- Relegated: Liakhvi
- Matches played: 304
- Goals scored: 811 (2.67 per match)
- Top goalscorer: Gia Guruli; Mamuka Pantsulaia (23)
- Biggest home win: Iberia 8–1 Mertskhali; Gorda 8–1 Shevardeni; Iberia 7–0 Liakhvi; Dila 7–0 Amirani
- Biggest away win: Shevardeni 1–8 Guria; Liakhvi 1–8 Kolkheti Poti
- Highest scoring: Kutaisi 8–3 Dila

The 1990 Umaglesi Liga was the first and inaugural season of top-tier football in Georgia. It began on 30 March and ended on 12 November 1990. Georgia was still a part of the Soviet Union, but the Georgian clubs were withdrawn from the Soviet league system and formed the Georgian league system. Iberia Tbilisi won the championship.

The league was formed by 18 clubs based on their performance the previous year across four tiers:

- Soviet Top League: Iberia, Guria;
- Soviet First League: Torpedo, Batumi and Tskhumi (the latter was created after Dinamo Sokhumi split into two clubs);
- Soviet Second League: Savanardo, Kolkheti Poti, Kolkheti Khobi, Gorda, Dila, Mertskhali, Shevardeni;
- Georgian Championship: Samgurali, Odishi, Amirani, Mziuri, Iveria, Liakhvi.

== Locations ==
Location of teams in 1990 Umaglesi Liga

== League standings ==
Pos	Team	Pld	W	D	L	GF	GA	GD	Pts	Relegation
1	Iberia Tbilisi (C)	34	24	6	4	91	23	+68	78	
2	Guria Lanchkhuti	34	22	6	6	73	20	+53	72	
3	Gorda Rustavi	34	22	3	9	63	33	+30	69	
4	Kutaisi	34	20	5	9	62	33	+29	65	
5	Kolkheti-1913 Poti	34	19	5	10	53	31	+22	62	
6	Batumi	34	18	7	9	56	28	+28	61	
7	Tskhumi Sokhumi	34	13	10	11	50	36	+14	49	
8	Odishi Zugdidi	34	12	10	12	47	38	+9	46	
9	Mertskhali Ozurgeti	34	11	10	13	49	47	+2	43	
10	Dila Gori	34	12	6	16	52	58	−6	42	
11	Kolkheti Khobi	34	11	8	15	42	43	−1	41	
12	Sanavardo Samtredia	34	11	7	16	35	50	−15	40 (Note: Head-to-head record: Sanavardo Samtredia–Mziuri Gali 3–2, Mziuri Gali–Sanavardo Samtredia 1–0.)	
12	Mziuri Gali	34	11	7	16	47	69	−22	40	
14	Samgurali Tskaltubo	34	11	6	17	42	57	−15	39	
15	Iveria Khashuri	34	11	5	18	33	61	−28	38	
16	Shevardeni-1906 Tbilisi	34	10	8	16	39	64	−25	38	
17	Amirani Ochamchire	34	10	7	17	36	55	−19	37	
18	Liakhvi Tskhinvali (Note: Liakhvi Tskhinvali withdrew after Round 24 due to South Ossetia War.) (R)	34	0	0	34	11	135	−124	0	Withdrew from the league

Source: rsssf.org
Rules for classification: 1st points; 2nd matches won; 3rd head-to-head
(C) Champions; (R) Relegated

== Results ==
Home \ Away	AMI	BAT	DIL	GOR	GUR	IBE	IKH	KKH	KOL	KUT	LIA	MRT	MZI	ODI	SMG	SAN	SHE	TSK
Amirani Ochamchire		0–1	0–0	1–0	0–0	0–2	2–2	2–2	2–2	2–1	3–0 (Note: Match awarded after a withdrawal of Liakhvi.)	2–1	1–0	0–1	3–2	0–1	1–0	3–2
Batumi	1–0		4–2	1–0	0–1	2–0	6–1	3–0	1–0	1–1	3–0	0–0	2–2	1–0	2–0	2–1	1–1	3–1
Dila Gori	7–0	0–0		0–3	1–0	0–3	3–1	1–0	0–1	3–1	7–1	4–2	5–1	2–1	0–0	3–0	0–0	3–2
Gorda Rustavi	1–0	3–0	2–0		0–0	1–1	2–0	1–0	1–0	2–1	3–0	2–0	2–3	2–1	2–0	6–4	8–1	3–0
Guria Lanchkhuti	2–0	0–0	1–0	1–0		0–1	3–1	3–0	2–0	2–2	6–0	2–0	6–1	5–0	2–0	2–0	4–0	3–0
Iberia Tbilisi	6–0	3–1	5–0	0–1	1–1		1–0	5–0	0–1	2–0	7–0	8–1	3–1	4–2	7–1	4–0	2–0	1–1
Iveria Khashuri	2–0	4–3	2–1	1–3	0–4	0–3		1–0	0–2	2–2	5–0	0–4	1–3	1–0	1–2	2–1	2–0	0–0
Kolkheti Khobi	1–2	0–4	3–0	3–1	1–0	1–2	5–0		0–0	0–1	4–0	1–1	1–1	1–0	3–1	0–0	2–0	1–0
Kolkheti-1913 Poti	3–2	1–0	1–0	0–2	0–1	1–2	2–0	0–2		1–0	3–2	4–1	4–1	0–0	1–0	5–0	2–0	1–0
Kutaisi	3–0 (Note: Match awarded.)	1–0	8–3	3–0	2–1	0–2	0–1	1–0	1–2		6–0	1–0	1–0	2–1	4–2	1–0	3–1	1–1
Liakhvi Tskhinvali	1–6	0–6	0–3	0–3	1–5	1–4	1–2	0–3	1–8	0–3		0–4	0–4	0–3	0–3	1–2	1–5	0–5
Mertskhali Ozurgeti	1–0	0–0	1–1	3–1	5–2	1–4	0–0	2–2	2–0	0–1	3–0		4–1	2–2	2–1	4–0	2–0	0–0
Mziuri Gali	4–2	1–2	1–1	2–4	0–0	3–2	1–0	0–0	0–4	0–3	2–0	2–1		0–0	4–2	1–0	1–1	1–0
Odishi Zugdidi	0–0	2–1	3–1	1–2	0–1	1–1	3–1	3–2	1–1	0–0	2–0	0–0	4–0		3–1	0–2	3–0	2–1
Samgurali Tskaltubo	1–0	1–0	2–0	0–1	1–2	0–0	0–1	2–1	1–1	1–3	3–1	3–1	5–3	2–1		2–1	0–3	1–2
Sanavardo Samtredia	1–1	0–1	3–1	1–1	1–0	0–1	2–0	2–2	0–1	1–0	3–0	1–0	3–2	1–1	0–0		1–2	0–0
Shevardeni-1906 Tbilisi	3–1	0–3	1–0	3–0	1–8	1–3	0–0	3–1	2–1	1–3	3–0	0–0	2–0	0–5	1–1	2–3		1–1
Tskhumi Sokhumi	1–0	2–1	5–0	2–0	1–3	1–1	3–0	1–0	4–0	1–2	3–0	2–1	3–1	1–1	1–1	2–0	1–1	

Source: globalsportsarchive.com
Legend: Blue = home team win; Yellow = draw; Red = away team win.

== Top goalscorers ==
Rank	Goalscorer	Team	Goals
1	(Georgia (country)) Gia Guruli	Iberia Tbilisi	23
1	(Georgia (country)) Mamuka Pantsulaia	Gorda Rustavi	23
3	(Georgia (country)) Otar Korgalidze	Guria Lanchkhuti	21

== Awards ==
Name	Player	Club
Player of the Year	Temur Ketsbaia	Iberia
Goalkeeper of the Year	Nika Chkheidze	Kutaisi
Defender of the Year	Kakha Tskhadadze	Iberia
Midfielder of the Year	Gocha Gogrichiani	Tskhumi
U21 Footballer of the Year	Mikheil Jishkariani	Tskhumi
U18 Footballer of the Year	Georgi Nemsadze	Iberia
Discovery of the Year	Gocha Gujabidze	Guria
Goal of the Year	Levan Kipiani	Shevardeni

== See also ==
- 1990 Pirveli Liga
- 1990 Georgian Cup
