= 1991–92 Pirveli Liga =

1991–92 Pirveli Liga season was the third edition of the 2nd tier Pirveli Liga annual competitive Football in Georgia. It consists of reserve teams and professional teams.

== League standings ==
Pos	Team	Pld	W	D	L	GF	GA	GD	Pts	Promotion or relegation
1	Iveria Khashuri (C, P)	38	30	1	7	95	56	+39	91	Promotion to Umaglesi Liga
2	Kakheti Telavi (P)	38	28	6	4	125	46	+79	90	Promotion to Umaglesi Liga
3	Magaroeli Chiatura	38	27	6	5	109	56	+53	87	
4	Skuri Tsalenjikha	38	20	4	14	91	64	+27	64	
5	Sapovnela Terjola	38	17	7	14	62	50	+12	58	
6	Duruji Kvareli	38	17	6	15	65	65	0	57	
7	Armazi Mtskheta	38	18	1	19	91	72	+19	55	
8	Guria-2 Lanchkhuti	38	16	6	16	81	81	0	54	
9	Samegrelo Chkhorotsku	38	16	4	18	72	74	−2	52	
10	Merani Tbilisi	38	16	4	18	68	76	−8	52	
11	Meshakhte Tkibuli	38	15	4	19	67	75	−8	49	
12	Shevardeni Zugdidi (R)	38	14	4	20	65	92	−27	46	Relegation to Meore Liga
13	Egrisi Senaki (R)	38	13	6	19	60	85	−25	45	Relegation to Meore Liga
14	Armazi-90 Tbilisi	38	13	5	20	70	92	−22	44	
15	Imereti Khoni	38	13	5	20	63	84	−21	44	
16	Shukura Kobuleti	38	13	5	20	71	90	−19	44	
17	Kartli Gori	38	13	5	20	75	87	−12	44	
18	Aragvi Dusheti	38	13	5	20	58	89	−31	44	
19	Chikhura Sachkhere (R)	38	13	3	22	61	83	−22	42	Relegation to Meore Liga
20	Inst.fizkultury Tbilisi (R)	38	10	3	25	53	86	−33	33	Relegation to Meore Liga

Source: rsssf.org
(C) Champions; (P) Promoted; (R) Relegated

== See also ==
- 1991–92 Umaglesi Liga
- 1991–92 Georgian Cup
