= Nugzar Mikaberidze =

Georgian footballer (born 1963)

Personal information
- Date of birth: 31 January 1963 (age 63)
- Place of birth: Poti, Georgian SSR
- Height: 1.76 m (5 ft 9 in)
- Position: Midfielder

Youth career
- Poti Sport School

Senior career*
Years	Team	Apps	(Gls)
1981	Kolkheti Poti		
1982	Dinamo Tbilisi	2	(0)
1982	Kolkheti Poti		
1983–1986	Dinamo Tbilisi	54	(0)
1987	Guria	24	(0)
1988–89	Kolkheti Poti	73	(16)
1990–1992	Guria	75	(7)
1992–1998	Kolkheti 1913	132	(67)
- * Club domestic league appearances and goals as of 29 January 2026

Nugzar Mikaberidze (Georgian: ნუგზარ მიქაბერიძე, born 31 January 1963) is a retired Georgian professional footballer player who played as a midfielder.

Mikaberidze spent his seventeen-year career in three domestic clubs, winning the Georgian Cup and four Umaglesi Liga silver medals.

== Career ==
Mikaberidze joined his hometown club Kolkheti Poti in the Soviet Second League at the age of 18. Soon he drew attention from Dinamo Tbilisi scouts who signed him in 1982. Following a European cup triumph a year earlier, Dinamo were experiencing a significant transformation, trying to integrate young players into the first team. Mikaberidze mostly played for the reserve team, although made two appearances in the top league in his first year. During the five seasons with the club, he played more than 150 games, including 56 in the top tier.

In 1987, Mikaberidze moved to Guria who had gained promotion from the Soviet First League. In his first spell with the club, he took part in 24 games. The next two seasons Mikaberidze spent at Kolkheti, helping the team with a second-place finish. In 1990, he lifted the national cup with Guria following an extra-time win over Tskhumi. Also, twice in a row Mikaberidze won the league silver medals.

In 1992, Mikaberidze rejoined Kolkheti to stay with the club until the end of his career. During this period, he added two more silverwares to his tally. Mikaberidze mostly played as a forward, netting 67 times in 132 league appearances. On 29 June 1996, he made his European debut in a UEFA Cup home game against FK Zemun.

In 1998, the Georgian Football Federation named him among the best players of the season. In the same year, he retired at age 35.

== Honours ==
Guria

- Georgian Cup: 1990
- Umaglesi Liga runner-up: 1990, 1991

Kolkheti 1913

- Umaglesi Liga runner-up: 1993–94, 1996–97
