= Kakhaber Sidamonidze =

Georgian footballer

Personal information
- Date of birth: 17 April 1971 (age 55)
- Height: 1.88 m (6 ft 2 in)
- Position: Defender

Senior career*
Years	Team	Apps	(Gls)
1989	Shevardeni Tbilisi	21	(0)
1990–1993	FC Mretebi Tbilisi	102	(0)
1993–1994	FC Samtredia	12	(0)
1995–1996	FC Mretebi Tbilisi	11	(0)
1996	FC Augsburg	0	(0)
1996–1997	FC Guria Lanchkhuti	12	(0)
1997–1998	Merani-91 Tbilisi	11	(0)
1998	Odishi Zugdidi	2	(0)
1998–1999	Gorda Rustavi	14	(1)
1999	FC Sioni Bolnisi	13	(0)
2000	FC Dinamo Batumi	16	(2)
2001–2002	FC Sioni Bolnisi	60	(0)
2002–2003	FC Merani-Olimpi Tbilisi	4	(0)
2003–2004	FC Tbilisi	23	(0)
2004	FC Zestafoni	12	(0)
2005	FC Sioni Bolnisi	17	(0)
2005–2006	FC Dinamo Batumi	13	(0)

International career
1992–1994	Georgia	5	(0)
- * Club domestic league appearances and goals

Kakhaber Sidamonidze (born 17 April 1971) is a retired Georgian professional football player.
