= 1997–98 Umaglesi Liga =

Umaglesi Liga
- Season: 1997–98
- Dates: 8 July 1997 – 22 May 1998
- Champions: Dinamo Tbilisi; 9th Georgian title
- Relegated: Magharoeli Chiatura; Margveti Zestaponi
- Champions League: Dinamo Tbilisi
- UEFA Cup: Kolkheti Poti
- Cup Winners' Cup: Dinamo Batumi
- Intertoto Cup: Torpedo Kutaisi
- Matches played: 240
- Goals scored: 648 (2.7 per match)
- Top goalscorer: Levan Khomeriki (23)
- Biggest home win: Dinamo Batumi 7–1 Samgurali; Sioni 7–1 Margveti; Sioni 6–0 Odishi; Dinamo Tbilisi 6–0 Margveti; Merani 6–0 Odishi; Dinamo Tbilisi 6–0 Guria
- Biggest away win: Merani 0–5 Dinamo Tbilisi
- Highest scoring: Dinamo Batumi 7–1 Samgurali; Sioni 7–1 Margveti

The 1997–98 Umaglesi Liga was the ninth season of top-tier football in Georgia. It began on 8 July 1997 and ended on 22 May 1998. Dinamo Tbilisi were the defending champions.

== Locations ==
Location of teams in 1997–98 Umaglesi Liga

== League standings ==
Pos	Team	Pld	W	D	L	GF	GA	GD	Pts	Qualification or relegation
1	Dinamo Tbilisi (Note: 5 points deducted) (C)	30	24	4	2	86	15	+71	71	Qualification for the Champions League first qualifying round
2	Dinamo Batumi	30	18	7	5	58	19	+39	61	Qualification for the Cup Winners' Cup qualifying round
3	Kolkheti-1913 Poti	30	17	6	7	56	27	+29	57	Qualification for the UEFA Cup first qualifying round
4	Torpedo Kutaisi	30	15	9	6	51	30	+21	54	Qualification for the Intertoto Cup first round
5	Odishi Zugdidi	30	15	4	11	43	51	−8	49	
6	Locomotive Tbilisi	30	12	8	10	34	37	−3	44	
7	Merani-91 Tbilisi (Note: 5 points deducted for fan violence; 2 points deducted later)	30	13	7	10	39	33	+6	39	
8	TSU Tbilisi	30	11	6	13	35	33	+2	39	
9	Dila Gori	30	11	4	15	31	36	−5	37	
10	WIT Georgia	30	9	9	12	27	37	−10	36	
11	Metalurgi Rustavi	30	10	4	16	32	41	−9	34	
12	Samgurali Tskaltubo	30	9	7	14	31	50	−19	34	
13	Sioni Bolnisi	30	10	6	14	49	47	+2	31	
14	Guria Lanchkhuti	30	6	9	15	30	58	−28	27	
15	Magharoeli Chiatura (R)	30	7	5	18	25	59	−34	26	Relegation to Pirveli Liga
16	Margveti Zestaponi (R)	30	2	7	21	21	75	−54	13	Relegation to Pirveli Liga

Source: rsssf.org
Rules for classification: 1st points; 2nd matches won; 3rd head-to-head
(C) Champions; (R) Relegated

== Results ==
Home \ Away	DIL	DBA	DIN	GUR	KOL	LOC	MAG	MZS	MER	MET	ODI	SMG	SIO	TKU	TSU	WIT
Dila Gori		1–3	1–2	2–1	0–0	3–0	2–0	1–0	2–0	2–1	3–0	2–0	1–0	1–1	0–2	2–3
Dinamo Batumi	2–0		1–0	5–0	0–0	4–1	3–0	5–2	0–0	4–0	1–0	7–1	2–0	2–0	2–0	1–1
Dinamo Tbilisi	4–0	2–0		6–0	3–0	4–0	2–0	6–0	4–0	2–0	4–0	2–2	2–1	3–0	5–2	0–0
Guria Lanchkhuti	3–2	1–1	0–4		0–1	1–2	3–1	4–0	1–1	1–1	1–1	2–0	2–1	1–1	1–1	2–1
Kolkheti-1913 Poti	0–2	0–1	3–1	2–0		2–0	6–1	3–0	3–0	5–0	0–1	6–1	3–1	2–2	0–1	1–0
Locomotive Tbilisi	2–1	0–1	0–0	2–1	1–3		2–0	3–0	1–1	2–1	0–0	2–0	0–0	0–1	1–1	2–2
Magharoeli Chiatura	1–0	1–0	1–1	2–0	1–2	1–1		2–1	0–1	0–3	1–3	1–1	3–3	0–2	2–3	1–0
Margveti Zestaponi	0–0	1–4	2–5	1–1	1–2	0–1	1–2		0–4	1–0	0–2	1–2	0–0	1–3	1–0	2–4
Merani-91 Tbilisi	1–0	1–2	0–5	5–0	1–2	0–1	1–0	1–0		2–1	6–0	1–2	4–0	1–0	1–0	2–1
Metalurgi Rustavi	1–0	1–1	0–1	4–1	3–1	0–2	2–1	3–0	1–1		3–0	2–0	1–0	0–0	0–2	2–0
Odishi Zugdidi	3–0	1–4	1–5	1–0	1–3	0–2	4–1	2–2	1–0	3–2		4–0	4–2	0–0	1–0	5–0
Samgurali Tskaltubo	0–0	1–1	0–2	3–1	0–0	2–0	3–0	2–2	0–0	1–0	0–1		1–0	3–4	2–1	3–0
Sioni Bolnisi	3–1	1–0	0–4	2–2	2–2	0–2	4–0	7–1	2–2	2–0	6–0	2–0		4–3	1–0	3–0
Torpedo Kutaisi	1–0	1–0	1–4	4–0	1–1	4–1	1–2	1–1	3–0	4–0	4–1	2–0	1–0		4–2	0–0
TSU Tbilisi	0–2	0–0	0–1	0–0	0–2	2–1	4–0	5–0	0–1	1–0	1–2	2–1	4–2	0–0		0–0
WIT Georgia	2–0	2–1	0–2	1–0	2–3	2–2	0–0	0–0	1–1	1–0	1–1	2–0	2–0	0–2	0–1	

Source: rsssf.org
Legend: Blue = home team win; Yellow = draw; Red = away team win.

== Top goalscorers ==
Rank	Goalscorer	Team	Goals
1	(Georgia (country)) Levan Khomeriki	Dinamo Tbilisi	23
2	(Georgia (country)) Davit Mujiri	Dinamo Tbilisi	18
3	(Georgia (country)) Jumber Kalandadze	Odishi Zugdidi	17
3	(Georgia (country)) Giorgi Megreladze	Torpedo Kutaisi	17
5	(Georgia (country)) Paata Machutadze	Dinamo Batumi	15
6	(Georgia (country)) Nugzar Mikaberidze	Kolkheti-1913 Poti	13
7	(Georgia (country)) David Goderdzishvili	Locomotive Tbilisi / Merani-91 Tbilisi	11
7	(Georgia (country)) Giorgi Tkavadze	Sioni Bolnisi	11
7	(Georgia (country)) Mikheil Ashvetia	Dinamo Tbilisi	11
10	(Georgia (country)) Suliko Davitashvili	Merani-91 Tbilisi	10
10	(Georgia (country)) Malkhaz Tevdoradze	Samgurali Tskaltubo	10
10	(Georgia (country)) Mamuka Rusia	TSU Tbilisi	10

== See also ==
- 1997–98 Georgian Cup
