= 1991 Umaglesi Liga =

Umaglesi Liga
- Season: 1991
- Dates: 16 March 1991 – 28 June 1991
- Champions: Iberia Tbilisi; 2nd Georgian title
- Relegated: Iveria Khashuri
- Matches played: 190
- Goals scored: 577 (3.04 per match)
- Top goalscorer: Otar Korgalidze (14)
- Biggest home win: Shevardeni 7–1 Sanavardo; Alazani 7–1 Sulori; Iberia 6–0 Sanavardo
- Biggest away win: Samgurali 2–5 Kutaisi; Dila 0–3 Kolkheti Khobi; Iveria 0–3 Shevardeni; Kolkheti Khobi 0–3 Iberia; Odishi 0–3 Kolkheti Khobi; Sulori 0–3 Guria
- Highest scoring: Guria 6–3 Amirani

The 1991 Umaglesi Liga was the second season of top-tier football in Georgia. It began on 16 March and ended on 28 June 1991. In that season, Georgia was declared the independence from Soviet Union in April 1991, so the championship became national. The season was a transitional because from following season the schedule was changed to the autumn-spring schedule. Iberia Tbilisi were the defending champions.

== Locations ==
Location of teams in 1991 Umaglesi Liga

== League standings ==
Pos	Team	Pld	W	D	L	GF	GA	GD	Pts	Qualification or relegation
1	Iberia Tbilisi (C)	19	14	5	0	45	9	+36	47	
2	Guria Lanchkhuti	19	14	4	1	38	15	+23	46	
3	Kutaisi	19	11	2	6	34	30	+4	35	
4	Kolkheti-1913 Poti	19	10	3	6	30	19	+11	33	
5	Batumi	19	10	2	7	28	21	+7	32	
6	Tskhumi Sokhumi	19	9	4	6	34	26	+8	31	
7	Odishi Zugdidi	19	8	3	8	33	27	+6	27 (Note: Head-to-head record: Odishi Zugdidi–Margveti 1–1, Margveti–Odishi Zugdidi 1–1.)	
7	Margveti Zestaponi	19	8	3	8	32	32	0	27	
9	Gorda Rustavi	19	7	5	7	34	22	+12	26	
10	Alazani Gurjaani	19	8	1	10	28	36	−8	25	
11	Samgurali Tskaltubo	19	7	3	9	21	34	−13	24 (Note: Head-to-head record: Samgurali Tskaltubo–Dila Gori 2–0, Dila Gori–Samgurali 0–2.)	
11	Dila Gori	19	7	3	9	29	32	−3	24	
13	Mertskhali Ozurgeti	19	7	1	11	22	31	−9	22	
14	Mziuri Gali	19	6	4	9	25	28	−3	22 (Note: Head-to-head points: Mziuri Gali 12, Kolkheti Khobi 6, Shevardeni-1906 Tbilisi 0.)	
15	Kolkheti Khobi	19	6	4	9	27	30	−3	22	
16	Shevardeni-1906 Tbilisi	19	6	4	9	30	26	+4	22	
17	Sulori Vani	19	6	3	10	29	41	−12	21	
18	Sanavardo Samtredia	19	4	6	9	19	42	−23	18 (Note: Head-to-head record: Sanavardo Samtredia–Amirani Ochamchire 3–1, Amirani Ochamchire–Sanavardo Samtredia 1–3.)	
19	Amirani Ochamchire	19	4	6	9	27	37	−10	18	
20	Iveria Khashuri (R)	19	4	2	13	12	39	−27	14	Qualification to Relegation play-offs

Source: rsssf.org
Rules for classification: 1st points; 2nd matches won; 3rd head-to-head
(C) Champions; (R) Relegated

== Results ==
Home \ Away	ALA	AMI	BAT	DIL	GOR	GUR	IBE	IKH	KOL	KKH	KUT	MZS	MRT	MZI	ODI	SMG	SAN	SHE	SUL	TSK
Alazani Gurjaani		1–0						2–0		1–0		3–1		2–0		3–0	4–2	1–1	7–1	
Amirani Ochamchire					2–2		0–0	1–1	1–2	0–0			4–3	4–3					3–0	
Batumi	3–1	1–0				0–0		3–0		4–0	3–1	4–0	1–0	2–1						3–2
Dila Gori	5–2	2–3	2–0			1–1		3–1		0–3	3–3	0–1		2–0	1–0					
Gorda Rustavi	4–0		0–1	2–3			2–2				1–0				2–0	5–0	4–0	1–3	2–0	
Guria Lanchkhuti	1–0	6–3			1–0			5–2	1–0	4–1		3–1	2–0	5–2						1–0
Iberia Tbilisi	3–0		3–0	2–0		0–0					5–1				1–0	4–0	6–0	2–0	4–2	
Iveria Khashuri					2–1		0–2		1–2	1–0			1–0	1–2				0–3 (Note: Match awarded.)	1–0	0–2
Kolkheti-1913 Poti	2–0		1–0	2–0	3–3		1–2								2–0	4–0	1–1	3–1	2–2	
Kolkheti Khobi					1–1		0–3		1–3				2–1			2–0	0–0	3–0	3–0	3–3
Kutaisi	1–0	1–1				3–0		1–0	1–0	2–1		1–0	4–0	3–1						1–3
Margveti Zestaponi		4–2			2–0		3–3	4–1	0–1	4–2			2–1	2–1						3–1
Mertskhali Ozurgeti	4–0			2–1	0–3		0–2		2–1							2–1	1–2	1–0	1–0	2–0
Mziuri Gali					0–0		0–0		2–0	3–2			0–0			0–0		1–0	4–1	5–0
Odishi Zugdidi	3–1	4–0	2–0			1–1		4–0		0–3	4–2	1–1	5–2	3–0						
Samgurali Tskaltubo		1–0	3–2	2–0		0–1		4–0			2–5	3–2			1–0		2–0			
Sanavardo Samtredia		3–1	1–0	1–3		1–2		0–0			0–1	1–1		1–0	3–3					
Shevardeni-1906 Tbilisi		1–1	4–1	1–1		0–1					1–2	3–1			0–1	1–1	7–1			
Sulori Vani			0–0	2–1		0–3					5–1	1–0			2–1	3–1	6–2	2–3		
Tskhumi Sokhumi	5–0	2–1		4–1	2–1		0–1		1–0						5–1	0–0	0–0	2–1	2–2	

Source: globalsportsarchive.com
Legend: Blue = home team win; Yellow = draw; Red = away team win.

== Relegation play-offs ==
Iveria Khashuri	2 – 3 (a.e.t.)	Mretebi Tbilisi

== Top goalscorers ==
Rank	Goalscorer	Team	Goals
1	(Georgia (country)) Otar Korgalidze	Guria Lanchkhuti	14
2	(Georgia (country)) Durmiskhan Tvalabshvili	Sanavardo Samtredia	13
2	(Georgia (country)) David Ugrelidze	Guria Lanchkhuti	13
4	(Georgia (country)) Mikheil Kavelashvili	Iberia Tbilisi	12
5	(Greece) Andreas Niniadis	Batumi	11

== See also ==
- 1991 Pirveli Liga
