= Jugeli =

Jugeli (Georgian: ჯუღელი) is a Georgian surname. Notable people with the surname include:

- Mamuka Jugeli (born 1969), Georgian football player, manager, and scout
- Medea Jugeli (1925–2016), Georgian artistic gymnast
- Valiko Jugeli (1887–1924), Georgian political and military figure
