= Grigol Jomartidze Stadium =

Stadium in Georgia

Grigol Jomartidze Stadium გრიგოლ ჯომართიძის სტადიონი
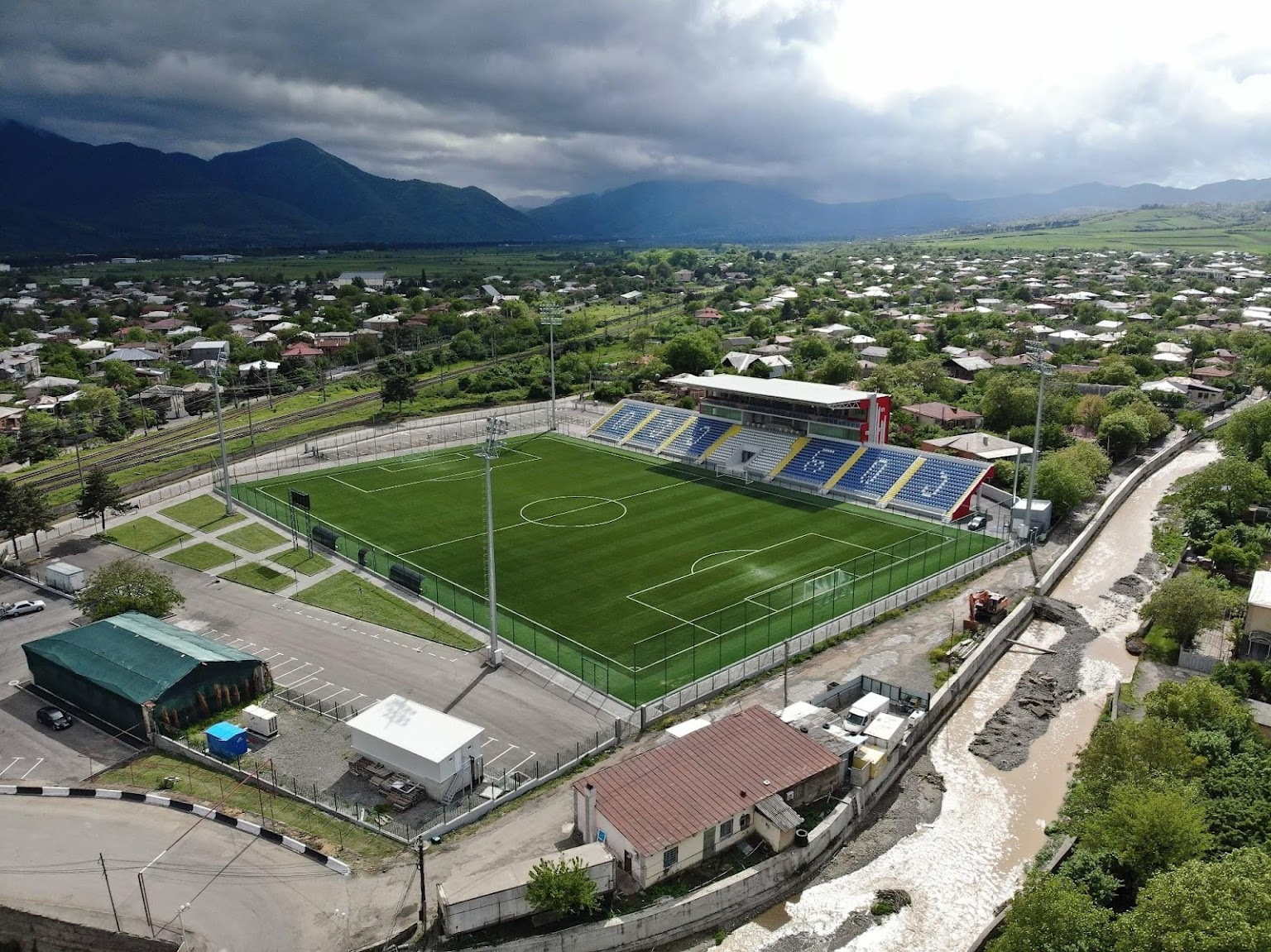
- Interactive map of Grigol Jomartidze Stadium გრიგოლ ჯომართიძის სტადიონი
- Location: (Georgia (country)) Khashuri, Georgia
- Coordinates: 41.9988°N 43.5936°E
- Owner: Government of Georgia
- Capacity: 2,000
- Surface: Artificial
- Field size: 105 m × 70 m (344 ft × 230 ft)

Construction
- Built: 1933
- Renovated: 1990, 2022

Tenant
- FC Iveria Khashuri

Grigol Jomartidze Stadium is a multi-use stadium in Khashuri, Georgia. It is used mostly for football matches and is the home stadium of FC Iveria Khashuri. After last renovation, the stadium is able to hold 2,000 people.

== See also ==
Stadiums in Georgia
