= Gia Guruli =

Georgian footballer

Personal information
- Full name: Gia Guruli
- Date of birth: 20 May 1964 (age 62)
- Place of birth: Chiatura, Soviet Union
- Height: 1.78 m (5 ft 10 in)
- Position: Striker

Senior career*
Years	Team	Apps	(Gls)
1982–1988	Dinamo Tbilisi	104	(19)
1988–1989	Guria Lanchkhuti	40	(18)
1989–1990	Iberia Tbilisi	25	(23)
1990–1992	GKS Katowice	36	(11)
1992–1994	Le Havre	48	(12)
1994–1997	USL Dunkerque	87	(9)
1997–1999	Calais RUFC	2	(0)
Total		342	(92)

International career
1994	Georgia	3	(0)

Managerial career
- 2012–2013: Dinamo Batumi
- 2014–2016: Kolkheti Khobi
- 2016–2017: Shukura Kobuleti
- 2017: Guria Lanchkhuti
- 2023-: Dunkerque U12
- * Club domestic league appearances and goals

Gia Guruli (born 20 May 1964) is a Georgian professional football manager and former player. He is the father of Alexander Guruli. He made his debut for the Georgia national team on 22 February 1994 against Israel and earned a total of three caps.

== Club career ==
In 1992, Guruli moved to Le Havre and on 8 August 1992, he played his first game for the club, a 2–0 win against Nîmes in the 1992–93 French Division 1, becoming the first Georgian to play in the league.

On 7 October 1992, he scored his first goal for Le Havre in a 3–0 French Division 1 win against Strasbourg, becoming the first Georgian to score in the league.

On 7 March 1993, as Le Havre won 3–0 against Le Touquet, he became at 28 years the first Georgian to play in Coupe de France.

He remained the only Georgian to play in that competition until 3 January 2004, when his own son Aleksandre played with Boulogne-sur-mer against Créteil in the 2003–04 Coupe de France at 18 years old.

He scored his twelfth and last goal for Le Havre on 29 January 1994, in a 3–0 French Division 1 win against Strasbourg; as of today he still remains the oldest Georgian goalscorer in the league.

He remained the oldest Georgian to play in Coupe de France until 2020–21, when his own son Aleksandre broke his record by playing the 2020–21 Coupe de France at 35 years.

== Career statistics ==
Appearances and goals by national team and year
National team	Year	Apps	Goals
Georgia	1994	3	0
Total		3	0

== Honours ==
Iberia Tbilisi

- Erovnuli Liga: 1990

GKS Katowice

- Polish Cup: 1990–91
- Polish Super Cup: 1991

Individual

- Erovnuli Liga top scorer: 1990
