= Levan Khomeriki =

Georgian footballer

Levan Khomeriki ლევან ხომერიკი
Personal information
- Date of birth: 20 January 1974
- Place of birth: Batumi, Georgian SSR
- Height: 1.87 m (6 ft 2 in)
- Position: Forward

Senior career*
| Years | Team | Apps | (Gls) |
| 1991–1995 | Dinamo Batumi | 91 | (54) |
| 1995–1998 | Dinamo Tbilisi | 75 | (57) |
| 1998 | Dinamo Batumi | 9 | (10) |
| 1999 | K.R.C. Mechelen | 6 | (4) |
| 1999 | Hapoel Haifa | 3 | (0) |
| 2000 | Dinamo Batumi | 14 | (8) |
| 2000–2002 | FC Aarau | 42 | (11) |
| 2002–2003 | FC Wohlen | 8 | (3) |
| 2003–2004 | Lokomotivi Tbilisi | 8 | (3) |
| 2004–2005 | Dinamo Batumi | 31 | (8) |

International career
| 1995–1996 | Georgia U-21 | 9 | (1) |

Managerial career
- 2014–2015: Dinamo Batumi
- 2016–2017: Dinamo Batumi
- 2020: Guria
- 2022: Telavi (assistant manager)
- 2023: Samgurali (assistant manager)
- * Club domestic league appearances and goals

Levan Khomeriki (Georgian: ლევან ხომერიკი; born 20 January 1974) is a retired Georgian football player and manager.

Khomeriki is the three-time Umaglesi Liga winner with Dinamo Tbilisi and a member of the 100 club comprising the Georgian players with a hundred or more goals. He represented his country at the U21 team.

== Playing career ==
Khomeriki spent most of his career at Dinamo Batumi in four tenures, making his debut on 1 March 1991 in a 3–0 win over Iveria. His first league goal came against Alazani on 30 October 1991.

In 1995, Khomeriki moved to Dinamo Tbilisi and won three successive league seasons. In 1998, he finished as the topscorer of the season. On 12 May 1998, Khomeriki scored his 100th goal to join the club as its 4th member. He bagged a brace in the final game of his career against Kolkheti 1913 on 22 May 2005. In total, Khomeriki scored 80 times in 145 league appearances for his hometown team.

== Managerial career ==
Khomeriki was an assistant manager with the national U17 team in mid-2000s. He also held different positions at Dinamo Batumi before being appointed as head coach in March 2014. Initially, he led the team to a second-place finish which implied a return to European club football after an eighteen-year absence. Two years later, his team secured 3rd place. Khomeriki left the club in May 2017 by mutual consent.

In 2020, Khomeriki took charge of Liga 3 side Guria. He also worked as an assistant head coach under Giorgi Chelidze at Telavi in 2022 and Samgurali a year later.
