= Mamuka Jugeli =

Georgian footballer

Personal information
- Full name: Ivane Jugheli
- Date of birth: 14 December 1969 (age 56)
- Place of birth: Zestaponi, Georgia
- Height: 1.80 m (5 ft 11 in)
- Position: Forward

Senior career*
Years	Team	Apps	(Gls)
1989–1990	Kolkheti Poti	55	(13)
1990	Kutaisi	15	(5)
1991–1993	Margveti Zestaponi	75	(52)
1993–1994	Kolkheti Poti	35	(24)
1995	Temp Shepetivka	16	(2)
1995–1996	Zorya Luhansk	17	(3)
1996	Tavriya Simferopol	13	(4)
1996	→ Dynamo Saky (loan)	1	(0)
1997	Daugava Rīga	6	(0)
1997	Liepājas Metalurgs	9	(2)
1998	Tavriya Simferopol	13	(2)
1998	Mykolaiv	5	(0)
1999	Prykarpattya Ivano-Frankivsk	4	(0)
1999	Kolkheti-1913 Poti	0	(0)
1999	Metallurg Lipetsk	4	(0)
1999–2000	Locomotive Tbilisi	11	(8)
2000	Guria-Lokomotive-2 Lanchkhuti	10	(4)
2001–2002	Gorda Rustavi	21	(7)

Managerial career
- 2009–2010: FC Anzhi Makhachkala (director)
- * Club domestic league appearances and goals

Mamuka Jugeli (born 14 December 1969), also known as Ivane Jugheli, is a Georgian football manager, scout and former professional player. He is the talent agent representing countryman Khvicha Kvaratskhelia.
