= Gocha Gogrichiani (footballer, born 1964) =

Georgian footballer (born 1964)

Personal information
- Date of birth: 12 August 1964 (age 62)
- Place of birth: Soviet Union
- Height: 1.76 m (5 ft 9 in)
- Position: Forward

Senior career*
Years	Team	Apps	(Gls)
1983–1987	Dinamo Tbilisi	39	(1)
1987	Torpedo Kutaisi	18	(3)
1988	Guria Lanchkhuti	34	(4)
1989	FC Dinamo Sokhumi	42	(25)
1990–1992	FC Tskhumi Sokhumi	61	(33)
1992–1993	FC Zhemchuzhina Sochi	49	(41)
1993–1995	AC Omonia	50	(28)
1995–1996	Nea Salamis FC	15	(2)
1996–1999	Zhemchuzhina Sochi	72	(19)
1999	FC Lokomotiv Nizhny Novgorod	13	(3)
2000	Zhemchuzhina Sochi	33	(10)
2001	FC Oryol	?	(9)
2002	SKA Rostov-na-Donu	9	(0)
2003	Zhemchuzhina Sochi	5	(2)
Total		407	(152)

International career
1990–1997	Georgia	9	(2)

Managerial career
- 2007: FC Zhemchuzhina-A Sochi (assistant)
- 2008–2009: FC Zhemchuzhina-Sochi (technical director)
- * Club domestic league appearances and goals

Gocha Gogrichiani (born 12 August 1964) is a Georgian football coach and former player.

He won nine international caps and scored two goals for the Georgia national team, including the fourth goal in a 5–0 rout of Wales in Tbilisi in November 1994, during the qualifiers for Euro 96.

At club level, he spent his peak years with Tskhumi Sokhumi, Zhemchuzhina Sochi, and Omonia Nicosia.

== Personal life ==
His son, also called Gocha Gogrichiani, is a professional footballer as well.

== Career statistics ==
=== International ===
Appearances and goals by national team and year
National team	Year	Apps	Goals
Georgia	1990	1	0
Georgia	1991	–	
Georgia	1992	–	
Georgia	1993	–	
Georgia	1994	2	1
Georgia	1995	1	0
Georgia	1996	4	1
Georgia	1997	1	0
Total		9	2

Scores and results list Georgia's goal tally first, score column indicates score after each Gogrichiani goal.

List of international goals scored by Gocha Gogrichiani
No.	Date	Venue	Opponent	Score	Result	Competition
1	16 November 1994	Boris Paichadze National Stadium, Tbilisi, Georgia	Wales	4–0	5–0	UEFA Euro 1996 qualification
2	8 May 1996	Zosimades Stadium, Ioannina, Greece	Greece	1–0	1–2	Friendly

== Honours ==
- Russian First Division Zone West top scorer: 1992 (26 goals).
