= FC Amirani Ochamchire =

Georgian football club

Amirani Ochamchire
- last logo of amirani ochamchire
- Full name: Football Club Amirani Ochamchire
- Nickname: Blue-White
- Dissolved: 2017; 9 years ago
- Ground: Central Stadium, Ochamchire (until 1993)
- Capacity: 2,000
- League: N/A

FC Amirani (Georgian: საფეხბურთო კლუბი ამირანი) was a Georgian football club based in the town of Ochamchire, Abkhazia, Georgia.

During the Soviet period, Amirani played in the Georgian championship. In the early 1990s, they took part in first three seasons of the top national league before suspending their activities due to combat actions engulfing the region. Later the team took part in four seasons combined in lower divisions.

== History ==
Amirani were a member of the republican championship (tier 4) for years. They achieved their best result in 1989 by finishing 3rd.

When Georgia broke away from Soviet football in February 1990, Amirani along with other two Abkhazian clubs, Mziuri and Tskhumi, joined a Georgian league and qualified for an Umaglesi Liga inaugural season. The club had an awful start to the season with a run of five successive losing and goalless matches. They took part in survival battles during other two seasons as well, narrowly avoiding relegation each time.

In the 1991–92 cup season, Amirani knocked out two rivals and reached the quarterfinals, where they sustained an extra-time defeat from Tskhumi. As the city soon became a flashpoint of the Abkhazian war, it left the team no choice but to withdraw from the tournament.

During this three-year period Amirani took part in 91 league matches in total, winning 27 of them. Twice they beat their opponents with a five-goal margin.

Later the club resumed functioning in Tbilisi. In the mid-2010s they made three final season appearances in the 3rd division.

== Seasons ==
| Season | League | Pos. | M | W | D | L | GF | GA | P |
|---|---|---|---|---|---|---|---|---|---|
| 1990 | Umaglesi Liga | 17_{/18} | 34 | 10 | 7 | 17 | 36 | 55 | 37 |
| 1991 | Umaglesi Liga | 19_{/20} | 19 | 4 | 6 | 9 | 27 | 37 | 18 |
| 1991–1992 | Umaglesi Liga | 17_{/20} | 38 | 13 | 8 | 17 | 48 | 56 | 47 |
The club was dissolved in 1993–1998
| 1999–2000 | Pirveli Liga East B | 7_{/11} | 20 | 7 | 3 | 10 | 31 | 44 | 24 |
The club was dissolved in 2001–2013
| 2014–2015 | Meore Liga East | 12_{/15} | 28 | 8 | 2 | 18 | 46 | 90 | 26 |
| 2015–2016 | Meore Liga East | 13_{/14} | 26 | 5 | 1 | 20 | 36 | 110 | 16 |
| 2016 | Meore Liga Center B | 7_{/9} | 14 | 3 | 1 | 10 | 33 | 81 | 7 |

== Honours ==
Georgian championship

- Third place: 1989

== Notable players ==
Vitaly Daraselia, the winner of the 1980–81 European Cup Winners' Cup, began his career at Amirani in 1973 at the age of 15 before joining Dinamo Tbilisi two years later.
