= Mikheil Jishkariani =

Georgian footballer

Personal information
- Full name: Mikheil Dimitrievich Jishkariani
- Date of birth: 1 November 1969 (age 56)
- Place of birth: Sukhumi, Soviet Union
- Height: 1.75 m (5 ft 9 in)
- Position: Forward

Youth career
- 1986–1987: Dinamo Gagra

Senior career*
Years	Team	Apps	(Gls)
1987–1988	Dinamo Tbilisi	4	(0)
1989	Dinamo Batumi	1	(0)
1990	Sanavardo Samtredia	5	(1)
1990–1993	Tskhumi Sokhumi	105	(73)
1993	Wormatia Worms	5	(4)
1994	Dynamo Kyiv	21	(4)
1995	CSKA-Borysfen Kyiv	14	(4)
1995–1998	KAMAZ-Chally Naberezhnye Chelny	63	(14)
1997	→ KAMAZ-d Naberezhnye Chelny	1	(0)
1999–2000	Sokol Saratov	36	(20)
2000	Locomotive Tbilisi	0	(0)
2000	Torpedo-ZiL Moskva	9	(2)
2002	Krasnoznamensk	9	(2)
2003	Neftyanik Ufa	4	(0)
2005	Ameri Tbilisi	1	(0)

International career
1991–1994	Georgia	2	(0)
- * Club domestic league appearances and goals

Mikheil Dzhishkariani (Georgian: მიხეილ ჯიშკარიანი; born 1 November 1969) is a Georgian former professional footballer who played as a forward.

== Club career ==
Dzhishkariani played mostly in Georgia and Russia, except for a spell at FC Dynamo Kyiv in 1993–1995 and a spell in Germany with Wormatia Worms. In Russia he played for FC KAMAZ Naberezhnye Chelny, FC Torpedo-ZiL Moskva, FC Sokol-Saratov, FC Krasnoznamensk and FC Neftyanik Ufa.

== International career ==
He played for the Georgian national team in 1992 and 1994, and was capped 2 times.
