= FC Mziuri Gali =

Georgian football club

Mziuri Gali
- Full name: Football Club Mziuri Gali
- Founded: 1977; 49 years ago
- Dissolved: 2015; 11 years ago
- Ground: Central Stadium, Gali (before 1993)
- League: N/A

FC Mziuri (Georgian: საფეხბურთო კლუბი მზიური) was a Georgian football club based in the town of Gali, Abkhazia, Georgia.

During the Soviet period, Mziuri won both the Georgian League and Supercup. Later in the early 1990s, they took part in first three seasons of the top national league before suspending their activities due to political tensions in the region which turned into a full-fledged war.

== History ==
Mziuri were a member of the Georgian republican championship (tier 4) for years. The late 1970s are considered their golden period. In 1977, the club achieved the double, winning the league for the first time and clinching the Supercup after a 1–0 victory over Nadikvari. In 1979, Mziuri won the silver followed by bronze medals a year later. Twice during this time, the team also reached the national cup final.

When Georgia broke away from Soviet football in February 1990, unlike fellow Abkhazian club Dinamo Sukhumi who opted to continue taking part in the Soviet league system, Mziuri chose to join a Georgian league and qualified for an Umaglesi Liga inaugural season. The club started its new chapter with a historic home win over Iveria. Later in the autumn, Mziuri delighted their fans by beating crowned champions Iberia Tbilisi as well. In the Georgian Cup, the team eliminated Shevardeni 1906 and advanced to the round of 16 where they sustained a 4–3 aggregate defeat from Guria, the future winners of this competition.

The 1991–92 season was most successful as the club under head coach Bondo Kakubava recorded 14 wins in 19 home games and came 7th in the table. Mziuri were about to commence a new season with ambitious plans in August 1992, but they had to abruptly withdraw after the war in Abkhazia broke out.

During this three-year period Mziuri held 91 league matches in total, winning 33 of them. Twice they beat an opponent with a five-goal margin.

In 2014, the club was restored in Tbilisi. Initially based at the Shatili sport complex, they spent one season in the 3rd division. Shortly afterwards, Mziuri was dissolved again.

== Seasons ==
| Season | League | Pos. | M | W | D | L | GF | GA | P |
|---|---|---|---|---|---|---|---|---|---|
| 1990 | Umaglesi Liga | 12_{/18} | 34 | 11 | 7 | 16 | 47 | 69 | 40 |
| 1991 | Umaglesi Liga | 14_{/20} | 19 | 6 | 4 | 9 | 25 | 28 | 22 |
| 1991–92 | Umaglesi Liga | 7_{/20} | 38 | 16 | 5 | 17 | 53 | 65 | 53 |
The club was dissolved in 1993–2013
| 2014–15 | Meore Liga | 9_{/15} | 28 | 11 | 4 | 13 | 62 | 68 | 37 |

== Honours ==
Georgian championship

- Winner: 1977
- Runner-up: 1979
- Third place: 1980

Georgian Cup

- Runners-up: 1978, 1984

Georgian Super Cup

- Winner: 1977
