= Otar Korgalidze =

Georgian footballer and manager

Otar Korghalidze
Personal information
- Full name: Otar Korghalidze
- Date of birth: 2 September 1960 (age 66)
- Place of birth: Tbilisi, Georgia
- Height: 1.82 m (6 ft 0 in)
- Position: Striker

Senior career*
Years	Team	Apps	(Gls)
1977–1978	Guria	18	(4)
1980	Dinamo Tbilisi	0	(0)
1981	Lokomotivi Tbilisi	0	(0)
1982–1986	Torpedo Kutaisi	154	(42)
1987–1988	Dinamo Tbilisi	29	(4)
1988–1992	Guria	141	(83)
1992–1993	Alazani	27	(23)
1993	Guria	5	(4)
1994	SV Salzburg	3	(0)
1994	Wiener Sport-Club	12	(0)
1994–1995	Wiener SC/Gerasdorf	5	(3)
1995	Dinamo Tbilisi	5	(1)
1995	Neftçi Baku	4	(2)
1996	FC Flora Tallinn	8	(3)

International career
1990	Georgia	1	(0)
- * Club domestic league appearances and goals

Otar Korghalidze (Georgian: ოთარ კორღალიძე; born 2 September 1960), also spelled as Korgalidze, is a Georgian former professional football player and manager.

== Playing career ==
During his playing career Korgalidze played for various clubs in Georgia, Austria, Azerbaijan and Estonia. He spent several seasons in the Soviet Top League and Soviet First League with Guria, Dinamo Tbilisi and Torpedo Kutaisi.

Korgalidze is the two-time Umaglesi Liga topscorer. He is also the first Georgian player to reach the 100 club in just 112 games. He won the 1994–95 season with Dinamo Tbilisi.

Korgalidze scored 3 goals in 8 games during his short spell at Flora Tallinn. He retired in 2000. His last club was FC Kuressaare.

== International career ==
Korgalidze is a former member of the Georgia national football team, featuring in its first historic international game against Lithuania on 27 May 1990.

== Managerial career ==
Following his playing career, Korgalidze was a manager for Dinamo Tbilisi, Olimpi and Sioni. In 2012, he was appointed as head coach of the national U19 team. Later he established a football school.

== Personal life ==
His son Levan Korgalidze played for the Georgia national football team and later became a coach, winning the Erovnuli Liga with Iberia 1999 in 2024. While his two grandchildren also play football, one of them, Tengiz Nebulishvili, received a call-up to the national U17s and took part in four games of the 2025 UEFA European Championship qualifiers.

== Honours ==
Dinamo Tbilisi

- Umaglesi Liga: 1994–95

Individual

- Umaglesi Liga topscorer: 1991, 1991–92
