= FC Duruji Kvareli =

- Full name: Football Club Duruji Kvareli
- Ground: Kvarlis Tsentraluri Stadioni; Kvareli, Georgia
- Capacity: 1,000
- League: Currently suspended

FC Duruji was a Georgian football club based in the Kakhetian town of Kvareli.

The club took part in the top tier of Georgian football system in 1994/95 and 1995/96 seasons. Later Duruji competed in low leagues, including Meore Liga until 2017.

Shortly after the relegation to Regionuli Liga the team ceased to exist.

== Stadium ==
Duruji's home ground is considered unique given its location inside the medieval Kvareli Fortress.

== Name ==
Duruji is a left tributary of Alazani river. It flows through Kvareli.
