= FC Mretebi Tbilisi =

Fc mretebi tbilisi
- Full name: FC mretebi tbilisi
- Nickname: Kartvelebi
- Founded: 1988; 38 years ago
- Dissolved: 2002
- League: N/A

FC Mretebi Tbilisi was a Georgian football club based in Tbilisi. Mretebi were founded on 3 February 1988 by Vazha Chkaidze, a football coach and theatre director. At that time, major football clubs in the Soviet Union were professional in practice, but were officially regarded as amateur. For example, Lokomotiv players were officially classed as railway workers. Mretebi were founded as an openly professional club, the first Soviet club to do so.

Amid the collapse of the Soviet Union, Georgian football established an independent football league system in 1990. Mretebi reached the last sixteen of the Georgian Cup in 1990, and won the Second Division in 1991. Winning the Second Division meant a playoff for promotion to the Umaglesi Liga, the highest level of Georgian football. Mretebi's opponents in the playoff were Iveria Khashuri, who had finished bottom of the Umaglesi Liga. Mretebi won 3–2 after extra time, and gained promotion. In their first season in the top division, Mretebi finished in mid-table with 48 points.

During this period of relative success Mretebi's star player was teenage midfielder Georgi Kinkladze, and in the 1992 close season reigning champions FC Dinamo Tbilisi agreed a transfer fee of one million roubles for the player. However, once Kinkladze's transfer was complete, Dinamo disputed the fee on the grounds that he had previously been a member of the Dinamo youth system.

Mretebi fared less well the following season, finishing sixteenth out of seventeen teams, and in 1994 they were relegated after winning only three matches all season. The club subsequently had league finishes in the lower reaches of the Second Division. In 1995 former Mretebi player Kinkladze joined Manchester City of the English Premier League from Dinamo Tbilisi for £2 million. As part of the deal which took Kinkladze to Dinamo, Mretebi were entitled to a proportion of any sell-on fee, but Dinamo refused to pay. A lengthy dispute in which the matter was referred to the Georgian Football Federation and FIFA followed, with Mretebi claiming $875,000 in unpaid fees. A decision by FIFA in 2000 ordered Dinamo to pay $300,000. Dinamo paid this sum in 2001, but the cost of the case and that of subsequent claims and appeals meant that Mretebi, by now playing in the lower echelons of the Georgian football system, suffered financial collapse and withdrew from the league in 2002. An appeal to the European Court of Human Rights was dismissed in 2007.
