= FC Kakheti Telavi =

Kakheti Telavi
- Full name: Football Club Kakheti Telavi
- Founded: 1936
- Dissolved: 2014
- Ground: Municipal Stadium; Telavi, Georgia
- Capacity: 12,000
Home colours	Away colours

FC Kakheti Telavi was a Georgian football club based in Telavi. They played in the Umaglesi Liga, the top division in Georgian football from 2005 to 2007, but were relegated to Pirveli Liga, the Georgian second division. The club did not win a match in their relegation season of 2006–07.

Kakheti Telavi finished seventh in the Pirveli Liga's Eastern (or Aghmoslaveti) Zone in the 2007–08 season.

The club played their home games at Municipal Stadium. Previously, the club was known as FC Nadikvari Telavi. The club also twice won the Georgian Cup during the Soviet era, in 1972 and 1977.

At the end of 2013−14 season, after the club was relegated from Pirveli Liga (second tier) to Meore Liga (third tier), Kakheti was dissolved due to financial difficulties.

== Honours ==
- Georgian Soviet Cup
  - Champion: 1972
- Pirveli Liga
  - Silver Medal winner: 1991, 1992
