= FC Tskhumi Sokhumi =

- Full name: Football Club Tskhumi Sokhumi
- Short name: Tskhumi
- Founded: 1990; 36 years ago
- Ground: Shromiti Rezervebi Stadium; Tbilisi, Georgia
- Capacity: 500
- President: (Georgia (country)) Alexander Tsulaia
- Vice President: Giorgi Zaria
- Manager: Nugzar Bojgua
- League: Regionuli Liga
- 2025: Regionuli Liga, 8th of 14

FC Tskhumi (Georgian: საფეხბურთო კლუბი ცხუმი) is a Georgian association football club, currently playing in Regionuli Liga, the fifth tier of Georgian football.

The club was based in Sokhumi in 1990–1993 and following the War in Abkhazia (1992–1993) was re-founded by an internally displaced person from Abkhazia in Tbilisi.

== History ==
In 1990, most Georgian clubs, including FC Dinamo Tbilisi, withdrew from the Soviet League system and established the Georgian national league as the Umaglesi Liga. The club's predecessor, FC Dinamo Sokhumi, refused to join it and continued to play in the Soviet First League for the next two seasons. Therefore, Tskhumi was formed to represent Sokhumi in Umaglesi Liga. Star players Gocha Gogrichiani and Giorgi Chikhradze joined from Dinamo. The first president was Guram Gabiskiria.

The team started successfully, reaching the Georgian Cup finals twice in 1990 and 1991 where they lost respectively to Guria Lanchkhuti and Dinamo Tbilisi. In 1991–1992 Tskhumi finished in 2nd place in the league, but due to the war in Abkhazia had to cease their participation in the championship along with all other clubs from the region.

Overall Tskhumi spent four full seasons in Umaglesi Liga.

All-time results
M	W	D	L	GF–GA
123	54	19	50	241–200

Between 1993 and 1999 FC Tskhumi was dissolved. The club restored their participation in the Georgian league and won Liga 3 in 2014 by a large margin.

Since then, Tskhumi has been playing in lower divisions.

== Name ==
Tskhumi is an old Georgian historical name for the capital of Abkhazia used prior to the 16th century instead of its current form.

== Stadium ==
The team has taken Shromiti Rezervebi stadium on lease. It has not gotten its own stadium and training base yet.

== Football kits and sponsors ==
Years	Football kit	Shirt sponsor
2013–2015	Nike	
2016–	Joma	

== Current squad ==
As of 31 March 2018 Note: Flags indicate national team as defined under FIFA eligibility rules; some limited exceptions apply. Players may hold more than one non-FIFA nationality.

No.	Pos.	Nation	Player
1	GK	GEO	Rati Chitadze
2	DF	GEO	Levan Khidasheli
3	DF	GEO	Giorgi Koridze
4	DF	GEO	Jaba Sulakvelidze
5	DF	GEO	Giorgi Jalaghonia
6	MF	GEO	Alexander Rostiashvili
7	MF	GEO	Luka Sabanadze
8	DF	GEO	Lash Ghonghadze
9	MF	GEO	Beka Karsimashvili
10	FW	GEO	Shota Apshinashvili (captain)
11	FW	GEO	Gaga Kukhianidze
12	GK	GEO	Rezi Karanadze

No.	Pos.	Nation	Player
13	GK	GEO	Giorgi Gabunia
14	FW	GEO	Levan Kokaia
15	DF	GEO	Beka Ivanishvili
16	DF	GEO	Nika Sadghobelashvili
17	MF	GEO	Lasha Zghenti
18	MF	GEO	Luka Sigua
19	FW	GEO	Nika Kobauri
20	DF	GEO	Otar Kupatadze
21	MF	GEO	valeri Tsaava
22	MF	GEO	David Nadiradze
23	MF	GEO	Lekso Tkachovi
24	DF	GEO	Irakli Intskirveli

== Personnel ==
=== Current technical staff ===
Position	Name	Nationality
Head coach:	Aleksander Kikacheishvili	(Georgia (country))
Assistant coach:	Gigi Samadashvili	(Georgia (country))
Goalkeeping coach:	Nukri Jologua	(Georgia (country))
Assistant:	Koba Gerliani	(Georgia (country))
Doctor:	Giorgi Injgia	(Georgia (country))
Administrator:	Bachana Gugumberidze	(Georgia (country))

- Last updated: 2 April 2018

=== Management ===
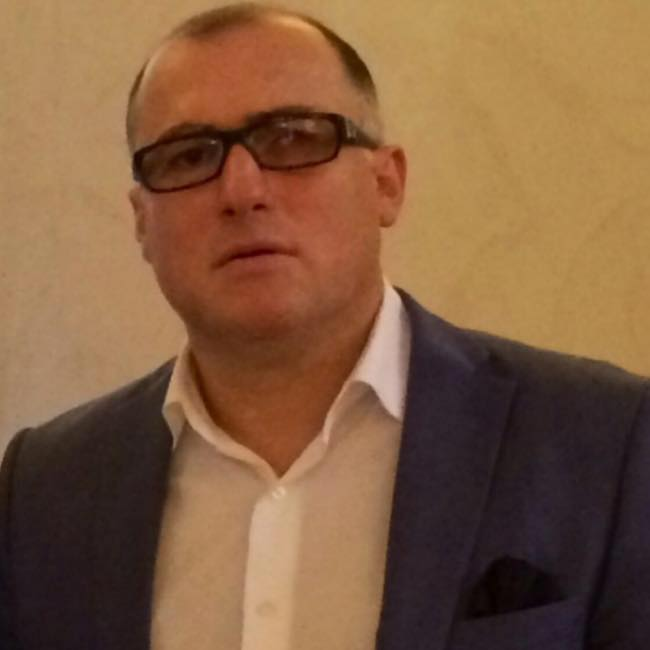
Georgian businessman Alexander Tsulaia is the current president of the club.

Position	Staff
President	Alexander Tsulaia
Director	Giorgi Zaria
Finance Director	Eter Gakharia

- Last updated: 11 March 2018

== Honours ==
- Georgian Umaglesi Liga
  - Silver Medal winner: 1991–1992
- Georgian Cup
  - Runner-up: 1990, 1992
- Meore Liga
  - Winner: 2014–15

== Top goal scorers ==
Years	Player	National	Goals
2017	Shotiko Apshinashvili	(Georgia (country)) Georgia	14
2015–16	Levan Kaldani	(Georgia (country)) Georgia	13
2014–15	Mindia Gogatishvili	(Georgia (country)) Georgia	27

== Managerial history ==
All managers of FC Tskhumi Sokhumi

Name	Dates
(Georgia (country)) Giga Norikadze	1990–1991
(Georgia (country)) Nugzar Bojgua	1991–1993
(Georgia (country)) Irakli Vasadze	2013–2016
(Georgia (country)) Levan Jobava	2016–2017
(Georgia (country)) Irakli Vasadze	2017–2018 (29 April)
(Georgia (country)) Giorgi Peikrishvili	2017–2018
(Georgia (country)) Irakli Vasadze	2018-2018 (18 May)
(Georgia (country)) Aleksander Kikacheishvili	2018–

== Seasons ==
Key

- P = Played
- W = Games won
- D = Games drawn
- L = Games lost
- F = Goals for
- A = Goals against
- Pts = Points
- Pos = Final position
- ERL = Erovnuli Liga
- STL = Soviet Top League
- SFL = Soviet First League
- R1 = First round
- R2 = Second round
- R3 = Third round
- QF = Quarter-finals
- SF = Semi-finals
- GS = Group stage
- QR1 = First Qualifying Round
- QR2 = Second Qualifying Round
- QR3 = Third Qualifying Round

Champions	Runners-up	Third place	Promoted

=== Georgia ===
Results of league and cup competitions by season
Season	Division	P	W	D	L	F	A	Pts	Pos	Georgian Cup	Super Cup	Manager		
1990	Umaglesi Liga	34	13	10	11	50	36	44	7th	Georgian Cup	Super Cup	Manager	–	Giga Norikadze
1991	Umaglesi Liga	19	9	4	6	34	26	31	6th	Runners-up	–	Nugzar Bojgua		
1991–92	Umaglesi Liga	38	24	4	10	96	53	76	2nd	Runners-up	–	Nugzar Bojgua		
1992–93	Umaglesi Liga	32	8	1	23	59	84	25	17th	SF	–	Nugzar Bojgua		
2014–15	Meore Liga	28	25	3	0	126	15	78	1st		–	Irakli Vasadze		
2015–16	Meore Liga	26	22	3	1	108	23	39	3rd		–	Irakli Vasadze		
2016	Meore Liga	16	12	1	3	65	15	37	3rd		–	Levan Jobava		
2017	Regionuli Liga	24	18	3	3	66	13	57	3rd		–	Giorgi Peikrishvili		
2018	Regionuli Liga A	20	11	2	7	51	29	35	5th		–	Aleksander Kikacheishvili		
2019	Regionuli Liga B	8	1	3	4	11	12	6	8th		–			
2020	Regionuli Liga A	13	7	3	3	32	16	16	4th		–			
2021	Regionuli Liga A	23	10	3	10	41	40	33	12th		–			
2022	Regionuli Liga A	26	12	6	8	47	33	42	4th		–			
2023	Regionuli Liga A	22	14	2	6	67	33	44	3rd		–			
2024	Regionuli Liga A	26	7	2	17	17	42	23	8th		–			
2025	Regionuli Liga A	26	10	4	12	51	62	34	11th		–			
