= FC Alazani Gurjaani =

Alazani Gurjaani
- Full name: Football Club Alazani Gurjaani
- Founded: 1962; 64 years ago
- Ground: David Kipiani Stadium, Gurjaani
- Capacity: 3,000
- League: Currently suspended

FC Alazani Gurjaani is a defunct Georgian association football club based in Gurjaani in Georgia, founded in 1964 during the Soviet Union.

== History ==
After the independence, the club's biggest achievement was made in the 1992–93 season, when it took the 3rd place in the Umaglesi Liga. During that period the team was led by Otar Gabelia and the name of the club was changed in FC Erkvani Gurjaani. Then in 1993 the name was changed again in Alazani Gurjaani.

In 2014/15 Alazani finished 2nd in Group East of the third league, one point short of the group leader. In 2020 the club participated in Regionuli Liga tournament.

== Stadium ==
The team play in David Kipiani Stadium in Gurjaani. The field was named in honour of David Kipiani. On 17 September 1992 was held the friendly match between Georgia and Azerbaijan ended 6–3 with 3000 attendances.

== Notable Players ==
- (Soviet Union) Varlam Kilasonia
- (Azerbaijan) Gurban Gurbanov
- (Georgia (country)) Zurab Popkhadze
- (Georgia (country)) Davit Tsomaia
- (Georgia (country)) Gocha Gujabidze
- (Georgia (country)) Otar Korgalidze
- (Georgia (country)) Davit Janelidze
- (Georgia (country)) Pavle Khorguashvili
- (Georgia (country)) Giorgi Sepashvili

== Managers ==
- 1992–1993: Otar Gabelia

== Crest and colours ==
The crest of the city of Gurjaani
