= FC Iveria Khashuri =

Iveria Khashuri
- Full name: FC Iveria Khashuri
- Founded: 1926 (unofficial)
- Ground: Grigol Jomartidze Stadium, Khashuri, Georgia
- Capacity: 2,000
- Manager: Vacant
- League: Liga 3
- 2025: 2nd of 16 in Liga 4 (promoted)
- Website: fciveria.ge

FC Iveria (Georgian: საფეხბურთო კლუბი ივერია) is a Georgian association football club based in Khashuri which competes in Liga 3, the 3rd tier of Georgian football, after winning the Liga 4 promotion in 2025.

Iveria took part in the Umaglesi Liga in the 1990s until relegation in 1997. The club later played between Pirveli Liga and Regionuli Liga. In 2024 and 2025, they achieved two successive promotions to reach Liga 3.

Iveria hold home matches at a 2,000-seater Grigol Jomartidze Stadium.

== Seasons ==
season	league	position	GP	W	D	L	B	GC	P	Georgian Cup
2025	Liga 4	2	30	18	7	5	55:25	30	61	1/128
2024	Regional League - Group "B"	1	24	20	2	2	101:22	79	62	
2023	Regional League - Group "B"	6	20	9	3	8	42:44	-2	30	1/64
2022	Regional League - Group "A"	3	26	17	4	5	64:29	35	55	1/128
2021	Regional League - Group "A" East	16	23	8	3	12	37:40	-3	27	
2020	Regional League - Group "A" West	6	16	7	3	6	36:31	5	24	
2019	Regional League – Group "A" West	7	9	2	2	5	12:23	-11	8	1/128
2019	Regional League – Relegation Group, West	6	18	8	2	8	28:31	-3	26	1/128
2018	Regional League – Group "G" East	9	20	5	1	14	26:79	−53	16	1/32
2018	Regional League – Relegation Group, East	7	12	5	1	6	21:27	−6	16	1/32
2017	Regional League	5	22	13	1	8	54:47	7	40	1/64
2016	Second League	2	14	10	1	3	38:11	27	31	
2015/16	Second League	6	28	17	3	8	60:38	22	54	
2014/15	Second League	7	25	11	1	13	35:53	−18	34	
2013/14	Second League	5	30	17	4	9	77:51	26	55	
2012/13	Second League	2	26	19	1	6	81:44	37	58	
2011/12	Second League	3	27	13	4	10	58:43	16	43	
2010/11	Second League	4	28	17	3	8	58:35	23	54	1/16
2009/10	Second League	8	22	5	5	12	39:52	−13	20	
2005/06	Second League	8	36	9	8	19	34:62	−28	35	
2004/05	First League	13	30	10	5	15	31:45	−14	35	1/16
2003/04	First League	13	30	11	6	13	29:42	−13	39	1/16
2002/03	First League	11	30	10	7	13	39:41	−2	37	1/16
2001/02	Second League	2	36	26	3	7	99–45	44	81	1/16
2000/01	First League – Regular Season	12	22	4	3	15	12:44	−32	15	
2000/01	First League – Relegation Round	4	10	5	2	3	23:9	14	25	1/16
1999/00	First League	3	20	14	0	6	45:20	25	42	1/16
1998/99	First League	4	26	13	6	7	58:38	20	45	1/16
1997/98	First League	3	30	21	4	5	76:27	49	67	1/16
1996/97	Premier League	16	30	5	6	19	24:61	−37	21	1/8
1995/96	Premier League	10	30	10	3	17	33:57	−24	33	1/8
1994/95	Premier League	11	30	9	4	17	42:58	−16	31	1/8
1993/94	Premier League – East	5	20	10	5	5	38:30	8	35	
1993/94	Premier League – Championship	10	18	3	2	13	14:47	−33	11	1/8
1992/93	Premier League	15	32	10	4	18	38:63	−25	34	1/16
1991/92	First League	1	38	30	1	7	95–56	39	91	1/32
1991	Premier League	20	19	4	2	13	12:39	−27	14	–
1990	Premier League	15	34	11	5	18	33:61	−28	38	1/16

== Honours ==
- Pirveli Liga
  - Champion: 1991–92

== Other teams ==
Iveria's reserve team known as Iveria-2 currently competes in Regionuli Liga.
