= FC Margveti Zestaponi =

Margveti Zestaponi
- Full name: FC Margveti Zestaponi
- Founded: 1990; 35 years ago
- Dissolved: 2000
- Ground: Zestaponi, Georgia
Home colours	Away colours

Margveti Zestaponi was a Georgian association football club based in Zestaponi between 1990 and 2000.

== History ==
In 1990 the Georgian Football Federation was founded to hold their own football competition and leave the Soviet football league system. Clubs like FC Dinamo Tbilisi and FC Guria Lanchkhuti gave up their place in the Soviet Top League to join.

At that time Zestaponi had their own club FC Metallurg Zestaponi. A new club, formed as Margveti Zestaponi, joined Pirveli Liga and was promoted in the first season. Margveti was a member of Umaglesi Liga and achieved their best season in 1995–96 by finishing runner-up. But in the 1997–98 season, Margveti finished at the bottom and was relegated.

FC Margveti Zestaponi faced financial problems and was declared bankrupt in 2000.

A new club using the city legend team name Metalurgi Zestaponi was formed in 1999. In 2006 Margveti-2006 was founded in the lower division and recently in Meore Liga, but it is a different (municipal) club.

=== Notable players ===
Zviad Endeladze became the club's most famous player after scoring 40 goals in a single season. With this achievement he joined the European Golden Shoe winners.

=== City rival ===
Although Metallurgi Zestaponi, Margveti Zestaponi and FC Zestaponi came from the same city, they never met in the league, and both clubs came from the succession of Metallurgi Zestaponi.

== Seasons ==
Season	League	Pos.	Pl.	W	D	L	GF	GA	P	Cup	Europe	Notes	Manager
1990	Pirveli Liga	2	38	28	3	7	102	44	87	Round of 32	N/A	Promoted	
1991	Umaglesi Liga	8	19	8	3	8	32	32	27	Round of 32	N/A		
1991–92	Umaglesi Liga	8	38	14	11	13	60	58	53	Round of 16	N/A		
1992–93	Umaglesi Liga	6	32	15	5	12	49	54	50	Semi-finals	N/A		
1993–94	Umaglesi Liga Champ.Group	8	18	4	3	11	22	41	15				
1994–95	Umaglesi Liga	9	30	10	6	14	35	53	36	Round of 32			
1995–96	Umaglesi Liga	2	30	22	2	6	85	37	68	Semi-finals			
1996–97	Umaglesi Liga	7	30	12	2	16	44	66	38	Quarter-finals	UEFA Cup Preliminary round		
1997–98	Umaglesi Liga	16	30	2	7	21	21	75	13	Round of 32		Relegated	
1998–99	Pirveli Liga West	2	24	18	4	2	78	24	58	Round of 32			
1999-00	Pirveli Liga	1	22	18	4	0	71	18	58	Round of 16			

Reserve

Season	League	Pos.	Pl.	W	D	L	GF	GA	P	Notes	Manager
1995–96	Pirveli Liga West	17	38	12	3	23	54	83	39		

== Eurocups ==
Season	Competition	Round	Country	Club	Score
1996–97	UEFA Cup	1Q	(Malta)	Sliema Wanderers	3–1 (A), 0–3 (H)
