= 1993–94 Pirveli Liga =

5th season of the Georgian Pirveli Liga

1993–94 Pirveli Liga was the fifth season of the Georgian Pirveli Liga. The Pirveli Liga is the second division of the Georgian Football league. It consists of both reserve teams and professional teams.

== Eastern zone ==
Pos	Team	Pld	W	D	L	GF	GA	GD	Pts
1	Duruji Kvareli	34	29	2	3	82	22	+60	89
2	Anzi Tbilisi	34	29	2	3	91	7	+84	89
3	Tetri Artsivi Tbilisi	34	29	1	4	98	26	+72	88
4	Krtsanisi-Zooveti Tbilisi	34	17	5	12	70	52	+18	56
5	Meskheti Akhaltsikhe	34	17	5	12	66	48	+18	56
6	Merani-91 Tbilisi	34	15	7	12	54	51	+3	52
7	FC Chabukiani	34	16	3	15	59	39	+20	51
8	Aragvi Dusheti	34	15	3	16	53	60	−7	48
9	FC Napareuli	34	14	2	18	71	82	−11	44
10	Bakhtrioni Akhmeta	34	14	2	18	45	55	−10	44
11	Armazi-90 Tbilisi	34	12	7	15	65	63	+2	43
12	Sioni Bolnisi	34	12	5	17	55	54	+1	41
13	Tori Borjomi	34	12	5	17	48	59	−11	41
14	Merani-Bacho Tbilisi	34	11	6	17	61	83	−22	39
15	Rkoni Kaspi	34	10	2	22	54	100	−46	32
16	Shiraki Dedoplistskaro	34	9	4	21	43	90	−47	31
17	Armazi Mtskheta	34	8	7	19	48	89	−41	31
18	Kartli Gori	34	2	2	30	13	96	−83	8

Playoff match: Durudzhi 0 - Anzi 0 with penalties 4-2

Promotions to Division 1: Kvareli

Team name changes before or during the 1993/94 season:

- Krtsanisi Tbilisi to Krtsanisi-Zooveti Tbilisi
- Merani Tbilisi merged with Bacho to form Merani-Bacho Tbilisi (Merani-91 Tbilisi is a different team)

== Western zone ==
Pos	Team	Pld	W	D	L	GF	GA	GD	Pts
1	Egrisi Senaki	26	22	2	2	69	24	+45	68
2	Anako Ozurgeti	26	22	1	3	60	17	+43	67
3	Meshakhte Tkibuli	26	17	4	5	61	25	+36	55
4	Kolkheti Abasha	26	17	2	7	54	28	+26	53
5	Kakhaberi Khelvachauri	26	13	2	11	47	43	+4	41
6	Bakhmaro Chokhatauri	26	12	5	9	54	42	+12	41
7	Universitet Zugdidi	26	12	4	10	52	43	+9	40
8	Chkherimela Kharagauli	26	11	4	11	52	41	+11	37
9	Imereti Khoni	26	11	3	12	46	40	+6	36
10	Sulori Vani	26	8	6	12	36	44	−8	30
11	Ulumbo Vani	26	6	2	18	36	70	−34	20
12	Guria-2 Lanckhhuti	26	4	3	19	20	57	−37	15
13	Chikhura Sachkhere	26	3	2	21	16	70	−54	11
14	Ukimerioni Kutaisi	26	3	0	23	8	67	−59	9

Team name changes before(or during) the 1993/94 season:

- Mertskhali Ozurgeti to Anako Ozurgeti
- Kolkheti-1 Abasha to Kolkheti Abasha
- Shevardeni Zugdidi to Universitet Zugdidi

Promotion play-off: Durudzhi Kvareli - Egrisi Senaki 1-0

== See also ==
- 1993–94 Umaglesi Liga
- 1993–94 Georgian Cup
