= 2019 Georgian Cup =

Tournament details
- Country: Georgia
- Teams: 92

Final positions
- Champions: Saburtalo Tbilisi
- Runners-up: Locomotive Tbilisi

Tournament statistics
- Matches played: 57
- Goals scored: 184 (3.23 per match)

The 2019 Georgian Cup was a single elimination association football tournament which began in early 2019 and ended on 8 December 2019. The winner of the cup earned a place in the 2020–21 UEFA Europa League.

Torpedo Kutaisi were the defending champions of the Cup after winning the final in the previous season in a penalty shoot-out over Gagra.

== Format ==
In 2019, the Georgian Cup was contested between 58 clubs. All rounds of the competition were decided over one leg. Any match which was level after regulation proceeded to extra time and then to penalties, when needed, to determine the winning club.

== First round ==
Fourteen second round matches were played on 24 March 2019.

Team 1	Score	Team 2
Kolkhi	1–8	FC Spaeri
Sulori	2–1	Imereti
Tori	6–0	Chkherimela
35-e Skola	1–4	Tbilisi City
Tbilisi	0–3	Algeti
Scout	0–3	Odishi 1919
Merani Martvili II	2–3	Samegrelo
Didube	0–5	Gareji
Salkhino	1–3	Egrisi
Zestafoni	1–1 (a.e.t.) (4–3 p)	Real Varketili
Legioni	3–0	Tskhinvali II
Rustavi II	1–3	Chiatura
Dinamo Batumi II	9–0	Alazani
Iberia	2–0	Matchakhela

== Second round ==
Twelve second round matches were played on 27–29 March 2019.

Team 1	Score	Team 2
Odishi 1919	0–3	Betlemi Keda
Egrisi	2–0	Samgurali
Dinamo Batumi II	1–0 (a.e.t.)	Saburtalo II
Gareji	1–0	Bakhmaro
Merani Martvili	1–0	Meshakhte
Zestafoni	2–0	Kolkheti Khobi
Chiatura	1–0	Aragvi Dusheti
Tori	2–5	Borjomi
Iberia	3–2	Samegrelo
Legioni	1–1 (a.e.t.) (3–2 p)	Gori
Algeti	0–3	FC Spaeri
Sulori	0–0 (a.e.t.) (3–4 p)	Tbilisi City

== Third round ==
Sixteen third round matches were played on 16–17 April 2019.

Team 1	Score	Team 2
Samtredia	3–2	Dila Gori
Gareji	2–0	Chiatura
Iberia	0–2	Merani Martvili
Legioni	1–2	Tbilisi City
Shevardeni 1906	1–2	Sioni
Egrisi	1–4	Dinamo Tbilisi
Saburtalo Tbilisi	1–0	Dinamo Batumi
Dinamo Batumi II	0–2	Rustavi
Gagra	2–0	Shukura Kobuleti
Telavi	3–0	WIT Georgia
Zugdidi	3–2 (a.e.t.)	Tskhinvali
Betlemi Keda	1–2	Guria
Borjomi	1–4	Torpedo Kutaisi
Zestafoni	0–2	Merani Tbilisi
FC Spaeri	5–1	Kolkheti Poti
Locomotive Tbilisi	1–0	Chikhura Sachkhere

== Fourth round ==
Eight fourth round matches were played on 18–19 June 2019.

Team 1	Score	Team 2
Gareji	3–3 (a.e.t.) (4–2 p)	FC Spaeri
Tbilisi City	3–1	Zugdidi
Merani Martvili	3–0	Guria
Samtredia	1–2	Saburtalo Tbilisi
Merani Tbilisi	1–0 (a.e.t.)	Dinamo Tbilisi
Gagra	2–3	Torpedo Kutaisi
Rustavi	2–0	Sioni
Telavi	0–1	Locomotive Tbilisi

== Quarter finals ==
Four quarter final matches were played on 24 & 25 September 2019.

Team 1	Score	Team 2
Gareji	2–1	Tbilisi City
Rustavi	0–0 (a.e.t.) (2–4 p)	Torpedo Kutaisi
Merani Martvili	1–2 (a.e.t.)	Locomotive Tbilisi
Merani Tbilisi	0–1 (a.e.t.)	Saburtalo Tbilisi

== Semi finals ==
Two semi final matches were played on the 23 October 2019.

Team 1	Score	Team 2
Saburtalo Tbilisi	2–0	Torpedo Kutaisi
Gareji	2–3	Locomotive Tbilisi

== Final ==
The final was played on 8 December 2019.

8 December 2019
15:30

Saburtalo Tbilisi	3–1	Locomotive Tbilisi
Kokhreidze 12'; Gabedava 19'; Kakubava 89'	Report	Sikharulidze 52' (pen.)

Tengiz Burjanadze Stadium, Gori
Attendance: 3,000
Referee: Irakli Kvirikashvili

== See also ==
- 2019 Erovnuli Liga
