= 2019 Liga 3 (Georgia) =

Football season in Georgia

Liga 3
- Season: 2019
- Dates: 4 March - 29 November
- Champions: Merani
- Promoted: Merani; Samgurali; Aragvi
- Relegated: Betlemi; Borjomi
- Matches: 180
- Goals: 488 (2.71 per match)
- Biggest home win: Aragvi 7-0 Borjomi (3 June)
- Biggest away win: Borjomi 1-6 Merani (13 May)
- Highest scoring: Saburtalo-2 6-2 Meshakhte (25 April)
- Longest winning run: Merani (7)
- Longest unbeaten run: Merani (13)
- Longest winless run: Kolkheti (11)
- Longest losing run: Betlemi (5)

Тhe 2019 Liga 3 was the third season under its current name and 32nd third-tier season since Georgia formed independent football league system in 1990. It began on 4 March and ended with promotion play-off return legs on 10 December.

== Team changes ==
Following the previous season, the number of teams participating in Liga 3 was halved. With no club promoted from a lower league, the five relegated teams were among first members of the newly formed Liga 4.

=== From Liga 3 ===
==== Promoted to Liga 2 ====
Zugdidi ● Guria Lanchkhuti

==== Relegated to Liga 4 ====
Samegrelo Chkhorotsku ● Magaroeli Chiatura ● Varketili Tbilisi ● Algeti Marneuli ● Imereti Khoni

==== Relegated to Regionuli Liga ====
Mark Stars Tbilisi ● Gardabani ● Sulori Vani ● Samgurali Tskaltubo-2 ● Machakhela Khelvachauri

=== To Liga 3 ===
==== Relegated from Liga 2 ====
Samgurali ● Merani

== Teams and stadiums ==
Locations of Liga 3 football clubs in 2019

| Clubs | Position in 2018 | Location | Venue | Region |
|---|---|---|---|---|
| Aragvi | 6th | Dusheti | Olympic Centre | Mtskheta-Mtianeti |
| Bakhmaro | 2nd | Chokhatauri | Boris Paichadze stadium | Guria |
| Betlemi | 10th | Keda | Archil Partenadze Stadium | Adjara |
| Borjomi | 7th | Borjomi | Jemal Zeinklishvili Stadium | Samtskhe-Javakheti |
| Gori | 9th | Gori | Kartli | Shida Kartli |
| Kolkheti | 5th | Khobi | Paata Tatarashvili stadium | Samegrelo-Zemo Svaneti |
| Merani | 10th in Liga 2 | Martvili | Murtaz Khurtsilava Stadium | Samegrelo-Zemo Svaneti |
| Meshakhte | 8th | Tkibuli | Temur Maghradze Stadium | Imereti |
| Saburtalo-2 | 4th | Tbilisi | Bendela | Tbilisi |
| Samgurali | 8th in Liga 2 | Tskaltubo | 26 May stadium | Imereti |

== Review ==
Being considered primary favourites for promotion, Merani won the league with a large margin after an impressive performance during the entire season. They achieved their promotion goal well beforehand, with five matches still remaining. Samgurali managed to thrash their play-off rivals with an aggregate score 9-0 and return to Liga 2 after one-year absence. Aragvi also prevailed over their opponents, despite a home defeat in the first leg.

Five teams were involved in a bitter survival battle close to the end. Gori, a most expected candidate for relegation, secured two victories in the last two games to climb out of the drop zone. Three clubs reached the finish line with equal points, but head-to-head results proved unfavourable for Borjomi, who were relegated along with Betlemi.

== League table ==
| Pos | Team | Pld | W | D | L | GF | GA | GD | Pts | Promotion, qualification or relegation |
|---|---|---|---|---|---|---|---|---|---|---|
| 1 | Merani (C, P) | 36 | 26 | 4 | 6 | 78 | 24 | +54 | 82 | Promotion to Erovnuli Liga 2 |
| 2 | Samgurali (P) | 36 | 21 | 7 | 8 | 52 | 29 | +23 | 70 | Qualification for Promotion play-offs |
| 3 | Aragvi (P) | 36 | 18 | 7 | 11 | 58 | 41 | +17 | 61 | Qualification for Promotion play-offs |
| 4 | Bakhmaro | 36 | 16 | 6 | 14 | 50 | 47 | +3 | 54 | |
| 5 | Saburtalo-2 | 36 | 15 | 3 | 18 | 53 | 67 | −14 | 48 | |
| 6 | Kolkheti | 36 | 11 | 8 | 17 | 39 | 54 | −15 | 41 | |
| 7 | Gori | 36 | 11 | 6 | 19 | 45 | 52 | −7 | 39 | |
| 8 | Meshakhte | 36 | 11 | 6 | 19 | 43 | 55 | −12 | 39 | |
| 9 | Borjomi (R) | 36 | 12 | 3 | 21 | 30 | 57 | −27 | 39 | Relegation to the Liga 4 |
| 10 | Betlemi (R) | 36 | 10 | 8 | 18 | 40 | 62 | −22 | 38 | Relegation to the Liga 4 |

Source: Soccerway
Rules for classification: 1) Points; 2) Head-to-head points; 3) Head-to-head goal difference; 4) Head-to-head goals scored; 5) Head-to-head away goals scored (only if two teams); 6) Goal difference; 7) Goals scored.
(C) Champions; (P) Promoted; (R) Relegated

== Promotion play-offs ==
4 December 2019
14:00 UTC+4

| Aragvi Dusheti | 0–1 | Guria Lanchkhuti |
|---|---|---|
| | Report | Iagri 10' |

Olympic Centre, Dusheti
Referee: Bakur Ninua
10 December 2019
13:30 UTC+4

| Guria Lanchkhuti | 0–2 (a.e.t.) | Aragvi Dusheti |
|---|---|---|
| | Report | Khintibidze 35'; Samadashvili 103' |

Evgrapi Shevardnadze Stadium, Lanchkhuti
Referee: Jener Khorava

Aragvi Dusheti won 2–1 on aggregate.

4 December 2019
14:00 UTC+4

| Kolkheti-1913 Poti | 0–3 | Samgurali Tskaltubo |
|---|---|---|
| | Report | Kakulia 6'; Akhvlediani 37'; Kutchukhidze 77' |

Fazisi Stadium, Poti
Referee: Arsen Nonikashvili
10 December 2019
13:30 UTC+4

| Samgurali Tskaltubo | 6–0 | Kolkheti-1913 Poti |
|---|---|---|
| Apkhazava 25'; Kutchukhidze 42'; Kukhianidze 67', 79'; Akhvlediani 69'; Gazdeliani 87' | Report |

26 May Stadium, Tsqaltubo
Referee: Giorgi Avazashvili

Samgurali Tskaltubo won 9–0 on aggregate.
