= 2023 Georgian Cup =

Tournament details
- Country: Georgia

Final positions
- Champions: Saburtalo Tbilisi
- Runners-up: Dinamo Batumi

Tournament statistics
- Matches played: 48
- Goals scored: 176 (3.67 per match)

The 2023 Georgian Cup was the 34th edition of the national football tournament in Georgia. The winners qualified for the 2024–25 Conference League first qualifying round.

Saburtalo Tbilisi won the cup on 6 December 2023 with a 1–0 win over Dinamo Batumi, their third Georgian Cup win.

== First round ==
Team 1	Score	Team 2
12 May 2023
35-e Skola	3–0	Iveria Khashuri
Gardabani	3–1	Zestaponi
13 May 2023
Bakhmaro Chokhatauri	1–0	Locomotive Tbilisi II
Basa	4–0	Magaroeli
Chikhura Sachkhere	3–5	Saburtalo II
Dinamo Zugdidi	0–1	Guria Lanchkhuti
Kolkheti-1913 II	0–1	Irao Tbilisi
Margveti 2006	1–2	Matchakhela Khelvachauri
Merani Martvili II	2–0	Odishi 1919
Samegrelo Chkhorotsku	0–7	Betlemi Keda
Shturmi	1–2	Meshakhte Tkibuli
Shukura Kobuleti II	1–0	Rustavi
Skuri Tsalenjikha	6–2	Merani Tbilisi II
Tbilisi City	5–2	Sulori Vani
Varketili	0–2	Gonio
WIT Georgia II	1–0	Samgurali Tskaltubo II
14 May 2023
Algeti Marneuli	0–2	Aragvi Dusheti
Varketili II	1–2	Borjomi

== Second round ==
Team 1	Score	Team 2
27 May 2023
35-e Skola	1–2	Bakhmaro Chokhatauri
Basa	2–4 (a.e.t.)	Guria
Betlemi Keda	4–1	Aragvi Dusheti
Dinamo Tbilisi II	0–0 (a.e.t.) (0–2 p)	WIT Georgia
Gardabani	0–2	Meshakhte Tkibuli
Gori	2–4	Kolkheti Khobi
Irao Tbilisi	5–1	Borjomi
Matchakhela Khelvachauri	3–2 (a.e.t.)	Saburtalo Tbilisi II
Merani Martvili II	2–3	Kolkheti-1913 Poti
Shukura Kobuleti II	2–1 (a.e.t.)	Tbilisi City
Tskhumi Sokhumi	2–6	Gonio
28 May 2023
WIT Georgia II	3–1 (a.e.t.)	Skuri

== Third round ==
Team 1	Score	Team 2
22 July 2023
Bakhmaro Chokhatauri	0–3	Spaeri
Irao Tbilisi	4–0	Merani Martvili
Lokomotive Tbilisi	3–0	Shukura Kobuleti
Matchakhela Khelvachauri	1–7	Kolkheti-1913 Poti
Samgurali Tsqaltubo	3–0	Gagra
WIT Georgia	2–2 (a.e.t.) (4–5 p)	Telavi
23 July 2023
Betlemi Keda	1–0	Gonio
Gareji Sagarejo	4–1	Merani Tbilisi
Guria Lanchkhuti	0–4	Saburtalo Tbilisi
Shukura Kobuleti II	1–2	Meshakhte Tkibuli
Sioni Bolnisi	4–1	Samtredia
WIT Georgia II	1–4	Kolkheti Khobi

== Fourth round ==
Team 1	Score	Team 2
29 July 2023
Betlemi Keda	1–2	Kolkheti-1913 Poti
Irao Tbilisi	1–1 (a.e.t.) (6–5 p)	Meshakhte
Kolkheti Khobi	1–3	Samgurali Tsqaltubo
Lokomotive Tbilisi	0–1	Dinamo Tbilisi
30 July 2023
Sioni Bolnisi	0–2	Dinamo Batumi
Telavi	0–1	Saburtalo Tbilisi
7 September 2023
Spaeri	0–2	Torpedo Kutaisi
12 September 2023
Gareji	1–2	Dila Gori

== Quarter-finals ==
Team 1	Score	Team 2
24 September 2023
Dila Gori	0–0 (a.e.t.) (3–4 p)	Saburtalo Tbilisi
Irao Tbilisi	1–4	Dinamo Batumi
25 September 2023
Kolkheti-1913 Poti	2–1	Torpedo Kutaisi
Samgurali Tsqaltubo	1–1 (a.e.t.) (5–3 p)	Dinamo Tbilisi

== Semi-finals ==
Team 1	Score	Team 2
7 November 2023
Kolkheti-1913 Poti	1–3	Dinamo Batumi
Saburtalo Tbilisi	2–1	Samgurali Tsqaltubo

== Final ==
6 December 2023
18:00

Saburtalo Tbilisi	1–0	Dinamo Batumi
Sikharulidze 90+2'

Mikheil Meskhi Stadium, Tbilisi
Referee: Goga Kikacheishvili

== See also ==
- 2023 Erovnuli Liga
