= 2020 Georgian Cup =

Tournament details
- Country: Georgia
- Teams: 46

Final positions
- Champions: Gagra
- Runners-up: Samgurali Tskaltubo

Tournament statistics
- Matches played: 45
- Goals scored: 116 (2.58 per match)

The 2020 Georgian Cup was a single elimination association football tournament which began in August 2020 and ended on 4 December 2020. The winner of the cup earned a place in the first qualifying round of the 2021–22 UEFA Europa Conference League.

Saburtalo Tbilisi were the defending Georgian Cup champions after winning the final in the previous season over Locomotive Tbilisi by a score of 3–1.

== First round ==
Eighteen first round matches were played on 20–24 August 2020.

Team 1	Score	Team 2
Saburtalo II	0–1 (a.e.t.)	Shukura Kobuleti
Iberia	1–4	Bakhmaro
Samegrelo	0–3	Kolkheti Khobi
Merani Tbilisi II	1–5	FC Spaeri
Imereti	0–0 (a.e.t.) (4–3 p)	WIT Georgia II
Sulori	0–1	Tbilisi City
Merani Martvili	3–1 (a.e.t.)	Aragvi Dusheti
Didube 2014	0–3	Sioni
Skuri	1–4	Dinamo Zugdidi
Borjomi	0–0 (a.e.t.) (2–4 p)	Gareji
Chiatura	1–2	Rustavi
Kolkheti Poti	1–1 (a.e.t.) (5–4 p)	Shevardeni 1906
Varketili	2–1	Algeti
Egrisi	1–2 (a.e.t.)	Gori
Zestaponi	1–1 (a.e.t.) (2–3 p)	WIT Georgia
Odishi 1919	0–1	Samgurali
Betlemi Keda	2–2 (a.e.t.) (4–3 p)	Meshakhte
Guria	0–2	Gagra

== Second round ==
Twelve second round matches were played on 24–30 August 2020.

Team 1	Score	Team 2
Bakhmaro	0–2	Telavi
Dinamo Zugdidi	2–4	Chikhura Sachkhere
Sioni	1–4	Merani Tbilisi
Varketili	0–2	Samtredia
Kolkheti Khobi	0–2	Torpedo Kutaisi
Imereti	1–2	Dila Gori
Samgurali	3–0	WIT Georgia
Tbilisi City	1–0	Shukura Kobuleti
FC Spaeri	1–0	Rustavi
Gareji	1–0 (a.e.t.)	Merani Martvili
Betlemi Keda	2–2 (a.e.t.) (4–3 p)	Gori
Kolkheti Poti	0–4	Gagra

== Third round ==
Eight third round matches were played on 17–21 September 2020.

Team 1	Score	Team 2
Gareji	0–2	Samgurali
Gagra	1–0	Dinamo Batumi
FC Spaeri	0–2	Dila Gori
Betlemi Keda	1–4	Torpedo Kutaisi
Tbilisi City	3–2	Samtredia
Telavi	2–0	Merani Tbilisi
Saburtalo Tbilisi	1–0	Dinamo Tbilisi
Chikhura Sachkhere	2–1	Locomotive Tbilisi

== Quarter finals ==
Four quarter final matches were played on 26–27 September 2020.

Team 1	Score	Team 2
Samgurali	2–0	Telavi
Tbilisi City	2–5	Chikhura Sachkhere
Gagra	0–0 (a.e.t.) (5–3 p)	Dila Gori
Saburtalo Tbilisi	2–0	Torpedo Kutaisi

== Semi finals ==
Two semi final matches were played on 8 November 2020.

Team 1	Score	Team 2
Gagra	0–0 (a.e.t.) (4–2 p)	Saburtalo Tbilisi
Samgurali	2–0	Chikhura Sachkhere

== Final ==
The final was played on 4 December 2020.

4 December 2020
16:00

Samgurali	0–0 (a.e.t.)	Gagra
	Report
Penalties
Patarkatsishvili (penalty scored); Kurdadze (penalty scored); Toure (penalty missed); Burjanadze (penalty scored)	3–5	(penalty scored) Khositashvili; (penalty scored) Kakiashvili; (penalty scored) Chaduneli; (penalty scored) Vekua; (penalty scored) Ergemlidze

Tengiz Burjanadze Stadium, Gori
Attendance: 0
Referee: Giorgi Kruashvili

== See also ==
- 2020 Erovnuli Liga
