= 2021 Georgian Cup =

Tournament details
- Country: Georgia
- Teams: 68

Final positions
- Champions: Saburtalo Tbilisi
- Runners-up: Samgurali Tskaltubo

Tournament statistics
- Matches played: 67
- Goals scored: 207 (3.09 per match)
- All statistics correct as of 8 December 2021.

The 2021 Georgian Cup is a single elimination association football tournament which began on 21 March 2021. The winner of this season's cup will earn a spot in the first qualifying round of the UEFA Europa Conference League.

Gagra are the defending cup champions after winning the final in the previous season against Samgurali on penalties.

== First round ==
Twenty-four first round matches were played on 21–23 March 2021.

Team 1	Score	Team 2
Dinamo Tbilisi II	3–1	Kolkheti Khobi
Chibati	2–4	Iberia Tbilisi
Samegrelo	0–6	Tbilisi City
WIT Georgia II	3–0	Egrisi
Odishi 1919	0–2	Gori
Tskhumi	1–3 (a.e.t.)	Merani Tbilisi II
Legioni	1–0	Torpedo Kutaisi II
Kolkhi	0–5	Didube 2014
Samtskhe Akhaltsikhe	3–2 (a.e.t.)	Sulori
Martve Kutaisi	0–1	Borjomi
Gldani	1–2	Zestaponi
Margveti 2006	1–2	Imereti
Algeti	3–2 (a.e.t.)	Meshakhte
Varketili	0–1	Kolkheti Poti
Tbilisi 2016	1–1 (a.e.t.) (5–4 p)	Merani Martvili II
Skuri	0–4	FC Spaeri
Shukura Kobuleti II	0–1	Shturmi
Zana Abasha	0–4	Magharoeli Chiatura
Irao	1–3	Aragvi Dusheti
Khikhani	0–3	Matchakhela
Samgurali II	0–0 (a.e.t.) (4–2 p)	Betlemi Keda
Bakhmaro	0–0 (a.e.t.) (4–5 p)	Guria
FC Tbilisi	1–4	Saburtalo II
Liakhvi Achabeti	0–1	Iberia 2010

== Second round ==
Twelve second round matches were played on 26–27 March 2021.

Team 1	Score	Team 2
Dinamo Tbilisi II	4–0	Imereti
Legioni	3–1	Samtskhe Akhaltsikhe
Borjomi	0–1	Didube 2014
Zestaponi	2–1 (a.e.t.)	Merani Tbilisi II
Algeti	0–0 (a.e.t.) (5–6 p)	Magharoeli Chiatura
Iberia Tbilisi	0–2	WIT Georgia II
Gori	3–1	Tbilisi City
Aragvi Dusheti	1–0	Kolkheti Poti
Tbilisi 2016	1–3	Saburtalo II
Iberia 2010	0–4	Samgurali II
Shturmi	1–6	FC Spaeri
Matchakhela	0–2 (a.e.t.)	Guria

== Third round ==
Sixteen third round matches were played on 18–21 April 2021.

Team 1	Score	Team 2
Zestaponi	1–2	Aragvi Dusheti
Guria	1–2	Chikhura Sachkhere
Legioni	0–5	Shevardeni 1906
FC Spaeri	0–1	Saburtalo
Dinamo Tbilisi II	2–1	WIT Georgia
Didube 2014	1–2	Gori
Magharoeli Chiatura	0–3	Samgurali
Shukura Kobuleti	1–0	Dinamo Tbilisi
WIT Georgia II	0–0 (a.e.t.) (6–7 p)	Dila Gori
Merani Tbilisi	2–5	Locomotive Tbilisi
Saburtalo II	2–5	Gareji
Samgurali II	1–3	Telavi
Sioni	4–2	Samtredia
Gagra	5–2	Dinamo Zugdidi
Merani Martvili	0–0 (a.e.t.) (3–1 p)	Torpedo Kutaisi
Rustavi	0–2	Dinamo Batumi

== Fourth round ==
Eight fourth round matches were played on 19–20 May 2021.

Team 1	Score	Team 2
Merani Martvili	0–1	Gagra
Locomotive Tbilisi	2–0	Telavi
Chikhura Sachkhere	0–5	Dinamo Batumi
Dinamo Tbilisi II	0–1	Gareji
Sioni	1–3 (a.e.t.)	Samgurali
Saburtalo	3–1	Dila Gori
Shevardeni 1906	0–2	Shukura Kobuleti
Gori	2–0	Aragvi Dusheti

== Quarterfinals ==
The quarterfinals were played on 28 October 2021.

Team 1	Score	Team 2
Locomotive Tbilisi	1–3	Dinamo Batumi
Gareji	1–2	Saburtalo
Gagra	1–2	Shukura Kobuleti
Gori	1–2 (a.e.t.)	Samgurali

== Semifinals ==
The semifinals were played on 24 November 2021.

Team 1	Score	Team 2
Shukura Kobuleti	2–3	Samgurali
Saburtalo	2–1	Dinamo Batumi

== Final ==
The final was played on 8 December 2021.

8 December 2021
17:00

Samgurali	0–1	Saburtalo
	Report	Tabatadze 65'

Ramaz Shengelia Stadium, Kutaisi
Attendance: 6,402
Referee: Jarosław Przybył (Poland)

== See also ==
- 2021 Erovnuli Liga
