= 2018 Liga 3 (Georgia) =

Football season in Georgia

Liga 3
- Season: 2018
- Dates: 5 March - 6 December
- Champions: Zugdidi
- Promoted: Zugdidi; Guria
- Relegated: Samegrelo; Chiatura; Varketili; Algeti; Mark Stars; Imereti; Gardabani; Sulori; Samgurali-2; Matchakhela
- Matches played: 380
- Goals scored: 1,084 (2.85 per match)
- Biggest home win: Gori 7-0 Sulori (30 March)
- Biggest away win: Matchakhela 0-5 Bakhmaro (22 October)
- Highest scoring: Gori 5-4 Bakhmaro (2 September); Varketili 7-2 Matchakhela (11 June)
- Longest winning run: Zugdidi (7)
- Longest unbeaten run: Bakhmaro (12)
- Longest winless run: Matchakhela (13)
- Longest losing run: Samgurali-2 (7)

Тhe 2018 Liga 3 was the second season under its current name and 31st third-tier season after the creation of independent football league system in Georgia. As a single two-round competition, it began on 5 March and ended on 6 December.

== Team changes ==
The following teams have changed division since the 2017 season:

=== From Liga 3 ===
==== Promoted to Liga 2 ====
Shevardeni-1906 Tbilisi ● Merani Tbilisi ● Telavi

==== Relegated to Regionuli Liga ====
Odishi 1919 Zugdidi ● Chkherimela Kharagauli ● Liakhvi Tskhinvali ● Sapovnela Terjola ● Skuri Tsalenjikha ● Margveti Zestaponi

=== To Liga 3 ===
==== Relegated from Liga 2 ====
Zugdidi ● Meshakhte Tkibuli ● Guria Lanchkhuti

==== Promoted from Regionuli Liga ====
Varketili Tbilisi ● Saburtalo-2 Tbilisi ● Matchakhela Khelvachauri ● Bakhmaro Chokhatauri ● Aragvi Dusheti ● Samgurali-2 Tskaltubo

== Teams and stadiums ==
Clubs	Location	Venue	Region
Argeti	Tbilisi	Shatili Stadium	Tbilisi
Aragvi	Dusheti	Olympic Centre	Mtskheta-Mtianeti
Bakhmaro	Chokhatauri	Boris Paichadze stadium	Guria
Betlemi	Keda	Archil Partenadze Stadium	Adjara
Borjomi	Borjomi	Jemal Zeinklishvili Stadium	Samtskhe-Javakheti
Chiatura	Chiatura	Temur Maghradze Stadium	Imereti
Gardabani	Gardabani	Martkopi Rugby Arena	Kvemo Kartli
Gori	Gori	Kartli	Shida Kartli
Guria	Lanchkhuti	Evgrapi Shevardnadze Stadium	Guria
Imereti	Khoni	Ipolite Khvichia stadium	Imereti
Kolkheti	Khobi	Paata Tatarashvili stadium	Samegrelo-Zemo Svaneti
Mark Stars	Tbilisi	Dusheti Olympic Centre	Mtskheta-Mtianeti
Matchakhela	Khelvachauri	Akhalsopeli Centraluri	Adjara
Meshakhte	Tkibuli	Vladimer Bochorishvili Stadium	Imereti
Saburtalo-2	Tbilisi	Bendela	Tbilisi
Samgurali-2	Tskaltubo	26 May stadium	Imereti
Samegrelo	Chkhorotsku	Bondo Papaskiri stadium	Samegrelo-Zemo Svaneti
Sulori	Vani	Grigol Nikoleishvili stadium	Imereti
Varketili	Tbilisi	Shatili stadium	Tbilisi
Zugdidi	Zugdidi	Ganmukhuri, Centraluri	Samegrelo-Zemo Svaneti

== League table ==
In their first season in the third tier, Zugdidi won the league through automatic promotion after a tight contest concluded in the last matchday of the season. Both teams representing the region of Guria qualified for play-offs, although only one of them succeeded in them.

According to the Federation's decision, a drastic reduction of the league teams involved ten clubs, who were supposed to be relegated to Liga 4 and Regionuli Liga next year.

Pos	Team	Pld	W	D	L	GF	GA	GD	Pts	Promotion, qualification or relegation
1	Zugdidi (C, P)	38	27	3	8	65	31	+34	84	Promotion to Erovnuli Liga 2
2	Bakhmaro	38	25	7	6	78	40	+38	79 (Note: Bakhmaro were deducted 3 points)	Qualification for Promotion play-offs
3	Guria (P)	38	21	10	7	59	31	+28	73	Qualification for Promotion play-offs
4	Saburtalo-2	38	21	4	13	60	50	+10	67	
5	Kolkheti	38	17	10	11	54	35	+19	61	
6	Aragvi	38	19	4	15	64	55	+9	61	
7	Borjomi	38	18	7	13	66	56	+10	61	
8	Meshakhte	38	17	6	15	59	54	+5	57	
9	Gori	38	14	11	13	58	48	+10	53	
10	Betlemi	38	14	9	15	52	58	−6	51	
11	Samegrelo (R)	38	13	9	16	63	55	+8	48	Relegation to Liga 4
12	Chiatura (R)	38	12	11	15	39	47	−8	47	Relegation to Liga 4
13	Varketili (R)	38	13	8	17	58	58	0	47	Relegation to Liga 4
14	Algeti (R)	38	13	7	18	54	64	−10	46	Relegation to Liga 4
15	Mark Stars (R)	38	13	7	18	59	65	−6	46	Play-offs for Relegation to Liga 4
16	Imereti (R)	38	12	9	17	44	52	−8	45	Play-offs for Relegation to Liga 4
17	Gardabani (R)	38	11	6	21	39	63	−24	39	Relegation to Regionuli Liga
18	Sulori (R)	38	10	6	22	38	77	−39	36	Relegation to Regionuli Liga
19	Samgurali-2 (R)	38	8	7	23	40	82	−42	31	Relegation to Regionuli Liga
20	Matchakhela (R)	38	5	13	20	35	63	−28	28	Relegation to Regionuli Liga

Source: Soccerway
Rules for classification: 1) Points; 2) Head-to-head points; 3) Head-to-head goal difference; 4) Head-to-head goals scored; 5) Head-to-head away goals scored (only if two teams); 6) Goal difference; 7) Goals scored.
(C) Champions; (P) Promoted; (R) Relegated

== Promotion play-offs ==
11 December 2018
14:00 UTC+4

Guria Lanchkhuti	1–0	Samgurali Tskaltubo
Jikidze 26'	Report

Evgrapi Shevardnadze Stadium, Lanchkhuti
Referee: Giorgi Kruashvili
14 December 2018
14:00 UTC+4

Samgurali Tskaltubo	2–1	Guria Lanchkhuti
Bibilashvili 28', 32'	Report	Gagnidze 57'

26 May Stadium, Tsqaltubo
Referee: Arsen Nonikashvili

2–2 on aggregate, Guria Lanchkhuti won on away goals.

11 December 2018
14:00 UTC+4

Tskhinvali	2–1	Bakhmaro Chokhatauri
Kiknadze 9', 42'	Report	Kverenchkhiladze 81'

Kartli Stadium, Gori
Referee: Arsen Nonikashvili
14 December 2018
13:00 UTC+4

Bakhmaro Chokhatauri	0–2	Tskhinvali
	Report	Vardzelashvili 55'; Tatkhashvili 90+1'

Boris Paichadze Stadium, Chokhatauri
Referee: Jener Khorava

Bakhmaro lost 4–1 on aggregate.

== Relegation play-offs ==
10 December 2018
14:00 UTC+4

Imereti Khoni	2–0	Dinamo Batumi-2
Khmelidze 84'; Nikuradze 88'	Report

Ipolite Khvichia stadium, Khoni
Referee: Jener Khorava
13 December 2018
13:00 UTC+4

Dinamo Batumi-2	0–0	Imereti Khoni
	Report

Angisa, Batumi
Referee: Giga Kikacheishvili

Imereti won 2–0 on aggregate and earned a slot in Liga 4

10 December 2018
14:00 UTC+4

Mark Stars	1–4	Gareji Sagarejo
Adeshina 22'	Report	Kaldani 21'; Tsikalanov 79'; Tavadze 88'; Melkadze 90+4'

Olympic Centre, Dusheti
Referee: Giga Kikacheishvili
13 December 2018
13:00 UTC+4

Gareji Sagarejo	3–0	Mark Stars
Jokhadze 31', 90' Gogilashvili 85'	Report

Arsen Mekokishvili Stadium, Sagarejo
Referee: Shota Kukhilava

Gareji won 7–1 on aggregate and advanced to Liga 4 from Regionuli Liga
