= 2020 Liga 4 (Georgia) =

Football season in Georgia

Liga 4
- Season: 2020
- Dates: 15 August – 18 December
- Champions: Varketili (White Group); Didube (Red Group)
- Promoted: Varketili Tbilisi; Didube Tbilisi; Merani-2 Tbilisi; Magaroeli
- Relegated: None
- Matches: 112
- Goals: 345 (3.08 per match)
- Biggest home win: Zestaponi 9–1 Egrisi (5 November)
- Biggest away win: Didube 0–6 Borjomi (25 September)
- Highest scoring: Zestaponi 9–1 Egrisi (5 November)
- Longest winning run: Didube; Varketili (6 matches each)
- Longest unbeaten run: Merani-2 (12)
- Longest winless run: Egrisi (9)
- Longest losing run: Samegrelo; Egrisi (5 matches each)

The 2020 Liga 4 was the second season of fourth-tier football in Georgia under its current title. The matches were supposed to begin in April, but due to the COVID-19 restrictions it was postponed until 15 August. The season ended on 18 December.

== Team changes ==
The following teams have changed division since the previous season:

=== To Liga 4 ===
Relegated from Liga 3:

Borjomi ● Betlemi

Promoted from Regionuli Liga

Didube Tbilisi • Iberia Tbilisi • |Merani-2 Tbilisi • Skuri • Sulori • WIT Georgia-2 • Zestaponi

=== From Liga 4 ===
Promoted to Liga 3

Spaeri • Tbilisi City

Relegated to Regionuli Liga

None

== Teams, results and league tables ==
Locations of Liga 4 football clubs in 2020

The season was due to be conducted as a single two-round competition. However, before the season started in August, the Football Federation decided to change the format and split the sixteen teams into White and Red groups.

=== White Group ===
Pos	Team	Pld	W	D	L	GF	GA	GD	Pts	Promotion, qualification or relegation
1	Varketili Tbilisi	14	10	2	2	34	11	+23	32	Promotion to Liga 3
2	Merani-2 Tbilisi	14	9	4	1	30	13	+17	31	Promotion to Liga 3
3	Algeti	14	6	2	6	25	30	−5	20	
4	Skuri	14	5	4	5	28	23	+5	19	
5	Betlemi	14	4	4	6	20	28	−8	16	
6	Zestaponi	14	4	4	6	22	20	+2	16	
7	Egrisi	14	2	4	8	23	47	−24	10	
8	Sulori	14	2	4	8	10	20	−10	10	

Updated to match(es) played on unknown. Source:
Rules for classification: 1) Points; 2) Head-to-head points; 3) Head-to-head goal difference; 4) Head-to-head goals scored; 5) Head-to-head away goals scored (only if two teams); 6) Goal difference; 7) Goals scored.

=== Red Group ===
Pos	Team	Pld	W	D	L	GF	GA	GD	Pts	Promotion, qualification or relegation
1	Didube Tbilisi	14	9	2	3	18	15	+3	29	Promotion to Liga 3
2	Magaroeli	14	6	6	2	23	11	+12	24	Promotion to Liga 3
3	Borjomi	14	7	2	5	27	13	+14	23	
4	Iberia Tbilisi	14	6	3	5	23	21	+2	21	
5	WIT Georgia-2	14	6	2	6	13	16	−3	20	
6	Odishi-1919	14	5	4	5	21	17	+4	19	
7	Imereti	14	4	1	9	16	24	−8	13	
8	Samegrelo	14	2	2	10	12	36	−24	8	

Updated to match(es) played on unknown. Source:
Rules for classification: 1) Points; 2) Head-to-head points; 3) Head-to-head goal difference; 4) Head-to-head goals scored; 5) Head-to-head away goals scored (only if two teams); 6) Goal difference; 7) Goals scored.

Notes:

• Despite being formally registered in Marneuli, FC Algeti played their all home matches in Tbilisi.
