= Giorgi Magaldadze =

Georgian footballer

Personal information
- Date of birth: 18 July 1994 (age 32)
- Place of birth: Georgia
- Height: 1.80 m (5 ft 11 in)
- Position: Forward

Team information
- Current team: Spaeri

Youth career
- Dinamo Tbilisi

Senior career*
Years	Team	Apps	(Gls)
2013	Stal-2 Alchevsk		
2014	Belshina Bobruisk	7	(0)
2016	Saxan	12	(1)
2017	Shevardeni-1906 Tbilisi		
2018	Tskhinvali	32	(2)
2019	Shevardeni-1906 Tbilisi	2	(0)
2019	Samtredia	7	(0)
2019–2020	Shevardeni-1906 Tbilisi	3	(0)
2020	Borjomi		
2021	Irao Tbilisi		
2022	Guria Lanchkhuti		
2023	Varketili		
2024–	Spaeri	17	(1)
- * Club domestic league appearances and goals as of 28 December 2024

Giorgi Magaldadze (born 2 February 1994) is a Georgian professional footballer who plays for Spaeri.
