= Samson Pruidze =

Georgian and Soviet football player and manager

Personal information
- Full name: Samson Pruidze
- Date of birth: 6 October 1957 (age 69)
- Place of birth: Kutaisi, Georgian SSR
- Height: 1.70 m (5 ft 7 in)
- Position: Defender

Team information
- Current team: Samgurali Tskaltubo

Youth career
- Torpedo Kutaisi
- Energetik Terjola
- Zoovetinstitut Tbilisi

Senior career*
| Years | Team | Apps | (Gls) |
| 1983 | Dinamo Tbilisi | 5 | (0) |
| 1984−1988 | Torpedo Kutaisi | 140 | (2) |

Managerial career
- 1994: Samgurali Tskaltubo
- 1994−1995: Margveti Zestaponi
- 1995−1996: Samgurali Tskaltubo
- 1996−1998: Torpedo Kutaisi
- 1998−2000: Iberia Samtredia
- 2002−2003: Torpedo Kutaisi
- 2004−2005: Borjomi
- 2008−2020: Chikhura Sachkhere
- 2020: Locomotive Tbilisi
- 2021: Samgurali Tskaltubo
- * Club domestic league appearances and goals

Samson (Soso) Pruidze (Georgian: სამსონ (სოსო) ფრუიძე) (born 6 October 1957 in Kutaisi) is a retired Georgian and Soviet football player and later Georgian manager.

== Player ==
Soso Pruidze spent an uneventful season at Dinamo Tbilisi at a time when the club was experiencing the change of generations following the Cup Winner's 1981 Cup glory. Then followed five seasons in Torpedo Kutaisi as a right defender, including in the Soviet Top League.

== Coach ==
Pruidze has been in charge of different clubs. He earned a first silverware in 2003 with Torpedo Kutaisi when the team came 2nd in the league after three consecutive Championship wins.

Pruidze became mostly known for a long-time managerial career at the helm of Chikhura Sachkhere. Apart from these twelve years being record-breaking in Georgian league history, Pruidze first guided the team to the top tier, then to national Cup and Super Cup titles, also to the silver medals. The fifth place was the lowest Chikhura took during his reign. Given the number of trophies, these years between 2012 and 2020 are known as the golden period in the history of this club. In a statement Pruidze pointed out that he felt exhausted and needed a rest.

In April 2021, Soso Pruidze was appointed as head coach of Samgurali Tskaltubo, where he had started his coaching career in 1994. His return marked another attempt to win the Georgian Cup. The team beat four opponents and reached the final for the second time in a row but failed to clinch the title.

At the end of this season he moved to the management as the head of Samgurali football school.

== Honours ==
=== Manager ===
Torpedo Kutaisi

- Umaglesi Liga

Runner-up (1): 2002–03

Chikhura Sachkhere

- Umaglesi Liga

Runners-up (1): 2016

- Georgian Cup

Winners (1): 2017

Runner-up (2): 2012–13, 2013–14

- Georgian Super Cup

Winners (1): 2013

Runner-up (2): 2015, 2018

Samgurali Tskaltubo

- Georgian Cup

Runner-up (1): 2021
