= 2018 Erovnuli Liga 2 =

Erovnuli Liga 2
- Season: 2018
- Dates: 1 March – 7 December 2018
- Champions: Dinamo Batumi
- Promoted: Dinamo Batumi; WIT Georgia
- Relegated: Merani Martvili; Samgurali Tskaltubo
- Matches: 180
- Goals: 450 (2.5 per match)
- Top goalscorer: Flamarion (24 goals)

The 2018 Erovnuli Liga 2 (formerly known as Pirveli Liga) was the 30th season of second tier football in Georgia. The season began on 1 March 2018 and ended on 7 December 2018.

== Teams and stadiums ==
Locations of the 2018 Erovnuli Liga 2 teams.

Team	Location	Venue	Capacity
Dinamo Batumi	Batumi	Chele Arena	6,000
Gagra	Tbilisi	Mtskheta Park	2,000
Merani Martvili	Martvili	Murtaz Khurtsilava Stadium	2,000
Norchi Dinamo	Tbilisi	Sport-kompleksi Shatili	2,000
Samgurali Tskaltubo	Tskaltubo	Murtaz Khurtsilava Stadium	2,000
Shevardeni 1906	Tbilisi	David Petriashvili Arena	2,130
Shukura Kobuleti	Kobuleti	Chele Arena	6,000
Telavi	Telavi	Givi Chokheli Stadium	12,000
Tskhinvali	Tskhinvali	Poladi Stadium	6,200
WIT Georgia	Mtskheta	Mtskheta Park	2,000

== League table ==
Pos	Team	Pld	W	D	L	GF	GA	GD	Pts	Promotion, qualification or relegation
1	Dinamo Batumi (C, P)	36	23	7	6	60	22	+38	76	Promotion to Erovnuli Liga
2	WIT Georgia (P)	36	18	11	7	43	23	+20	65	Qualification for Promotion play-offs
3	Gagra	36	16	10	10	50	41	+9	58	Qualification for Promotion play-offs
4	Norchi Dinamo	36	14	9	13	54	47	+7	51	
5	Telavi	36	12	12	12	45	43	+2	48	
6	Shevardeni 1906	36	11	10	15	38	49	−11	43	
7	Shukura Kobuleti	36	11	8	17	48	56	−8	41	
8	Samgurali Tskaltubo (R)	36	12	5	19	40	56	−16	41	Qualification for Relegation play-offs
9	Tskhinvali	36	10	6	20	36	66	−30	36	Qualification for Relegation play-offs
10	Merani Martvili (R)	36	8	12	16	36	47	−11	36	Relegation to Liga 3

Source: Erovnuli Liga 2, Soccerway
Rules for classification: 1) Points; 2) Head-to-head points; 3) Head-to-head goal difference; 4) Head-to-head goals scored; 5) Head-to-head away goals scored (only if two teams); 6) Goal difference; 7) Goals scored.
(C) Champions; (P) Promoted; (R) Relegated

== Relegation play-offs ==
11 December 2018
14:00 UTC+4

Guria Lanchkhuti	1–0	Samgurali Tskaltubo
Jikidze 26'	Report

Evgrapi Shevardnadze Stadium, Lanchkhuti
Referee: Giorgi Kruashvili
14 December 2018
14:00 UTC+4

Samgurali Tskaltubo	2–1	Guria Lanchkhuti
Bibilashvili 28', 32'	Report	Gagnidze 57'

26 May Stadium, Tsqaltubo
Referee: Arsen Nonikashvili

2–2 on aggregate, Guria Lanchkhuti won on away goals.

11 December 2018
14:00 UTC+4

Tskhinvali	2–1	Bakhmaro Chokhatauri
Kiknadze 9', 42'	Report	Kverenchkhiladze 81'

Kartli Stadium, Gori
Referee: Arsen Nonikashvili
14 December 2018
13:00 UTC+4

Bakhmaro Chokhatauri	0–2	Tskhinvali
	Report	Vardzelasshvili 55'; Tatkhashvili 90+1'

Boris Paichadze Stadium, Chokhatauri
Referee: Jener Khorava

Tskhinvali won 4–1 on aggregate.
