= Gaga Chkhetiani =

Georgian footballer

Gaga Chkhetiani გაგა ჩხეტიანი
Personal information
- Date of birth: 24 June 1983 (age 43)
- Place of birth: Georgia
- Position: Striker

Senior career*
Years	Team	Apps	(Gls)
2002–2005	Torpedo Kutaisi	49	(9)
2007	FC Zestaponi	11	(2)
2008	Dinamo Batumi	10	(3)
2008–2009	Olimpi Rustavi	26	(2)
2009	Ironi Nir Ramat HaSharon	15	(4)
2010	Sektzia Ness Ziona	17	(10)
2010	Maccabi Netanya	8	(0)
2011	Hapoel Kfar Saba	14	(2)
2011–2012	Maccabi Be'er Sheva	29	(6)
2012–2013	FC Chikhura Sachkhere	20	(3)
2013–2014	FC Merani Martvili	10	(0)
2014–2016	FC Sulori Vani	66	(53)
2017–2018	FC Samgurali Tsqaltubo	67	(24)
2019–2020	FC Merani Martvili		(15)
- * Club domestic league appearances and goals as of 14 May 2010

Gaga Chkhetiani (Georgian: გაგა ჩხეტიანი; born 24 June 1983) is a former Georgian footballer.

== Career ==
Chkhetiani started his professional career at his boyhood club Torpedo Kutaisi, where he earned first medals in 2003. With Olimpi Rustavi he won Umaglesi Liga in 2009.

After four seasons spent at four Israeli teams, Chkhetiani returned to Georgia in 2013. While at Sulori Vani in mid-2010s, Chkhetiani was a topscorer of Meore Liga and a key contributor to the team's promotion to Pirveli Liga.

In 2017, he joined Liga 2 side Samgurali Tskaltubo and for two successive seasons became a main goalscorer.

Merani Martvili was the last club he played for. With 13 goals scored in 2019, Chkhetiani helped his team to advance into the second division. After taking part in two games the next year, he was forced to end his career at age 37 due to some sustained injuries.

== Honours ==
- Georgian League:
  - Runner-up (2): 2002–03, 2004–05
- Georgian Cup:
  - Runner-up (2): 2004, 2013
- Meore Liga West:
  - Winner (1): 2015–16
  - Runner-up (1): 2014–15
- Meore Liga West 2014-15 Top Goalscorer (34 goals)
