= Nika Khorkheli =

Georgian footballer (born 2001)

Nika Khorkheli ნიკა ხორხელი
Personal information
- Date of birth: 9 September 2001 (age 25)
- Place of birth: Tbilisi, Georgia
- Height: 1.76 m (5 ft 9 in)
- Position: Right winger

Team information
- Current team: Samgurali
- Number: 7

Youth career
- Dinamo Tbilisi

Senior career*
Years	Team	Apps	(Gls)
2020	Spaeri		
2021–2022	Sioni	56	(14)
2023–	Samgurali	52	(8)
2024	→ Beitar (loan)	13	(0)
2025	→ Iberia 1999 (loan)	11	(0)

International career^{‡}
2022–2023	Georgia U21	6	(1)
- * Club domestic league appearances and goals as of 24 May 2026 ‡ National team caps and goals as of 11 March 2024

Nika Khorkheli (Georgian: ნიკა ხორხელი; born 9 September 2001) is a Georgian professional footballer who plays as a winger for Erovnuli Liga club Samgurali.

He is the winner of the national league with Iberia 1999.

== Club career ==
Khorkheli grew up at the Dinamo Tbilisi's academy. After several seasons spent at Dinamo-2, Gori and Spaeri, in early 2021 he joined Erovnuli Liga 2 club Sioni Bolnisi and helped them win the league in the same season. Khorkheli opened his goal-scoring account in the top tier in a 2–1 home win against Gagra on 3 April 2022. He finished the season as the team's topscorer with nine goals, although this circumstance did not prevent Sioni from relegation.

In December 2022, Khorkheli signed for Samgurali on a three-year deal and scored a brace in his debut game against Gagra on 26 February 2023.

On 5 February 2024, Khorkheli was loaned to Israeli Premier League club Beitar Jerusalem. He returned to Samgurali at half season to spend the rest of 2024 there.

In February 2025, Khorkheli signed a year-long loan deal with Georgia's reigning champions Iberia 1999 with an option to buy. He made 11 league appearances and lifted the champion's cup at the end of the season.

== Honours ==
Sioni

- Erovnuli Liga 2: 2021

Iberia 1999

- Erovnuli Liga: 2025 Erovnuli Liga

== Personal life ==
Khorkheli's grandfather, father and uncle all used to play football. Also, all five brothers in his family are footballers with Luka being Nika's teammate at Samgurali for two seasons.
