= 2019 Liga 4 (Georgia) =

Football season in Georgia

Liga 4
- Season: 2019
- Dates: 2 April – 14 November
- Champions: Spaeri
- Promoted: Spaeri; Tbilisi City; Gareji
- Relegated: None
- Matches played: 135
- Goals scored: 454 (3.36 per match)
- Biggest home win: Gareji 7–0 Varketili (5 September); Spaeri 7–0 Egrisi (24 October)
- Biggest away win: Algeti 0–4 Spaeri (6 September); Magaroeli 1–5 Gareji (10 October)
- Highest scoring: Spaeri 5–4 Tbilisi City (18 September)
- Longest winning run: Spaeri (11 matches)
- Longest unbeaten run: Gareji (16)
- Longest winless run: Imereti (11)
- Longest losing run: Imereti (8)

The 2019 Liga 4 was the first season of fourth-tier football in Georgia under its current title. There were ten clubs participating in it. The matches started on 2 April and ended on 18 November.

== Teams ==
Locations of Liga 4 football clubs in 2019

The league was formed by four relegated teams from Liga 3, four promoted teams from Regionuli Liga and two winners of play-off ties between these two division members. They took part in a single three-round competition.

== League table ==
Pos	Team	Pld	W	D	L	GF	GA	GD	Pts	Promotion, qualification or relegation
1	Spaeri Tbilisi	27	21	1	5	73	29	+44	64	Promotion to Liga 3
2	Tbilisi City	27	19	2	6	51	31	+20	59	Promotion to Liga 3
3	Gareji Sagarejo	27	17	6	4	66	34	+32	57 (Note: The promotion of Gareji to Liga 3 was made possible after FC Tskhinvali had been expelled due to financial difficulties.)	Promotion to Liga 3
4	Egrisi Senaki	27	14	2	11	49	43	+6	44	
5	Varketili Tbilisi	27	13	3	11	48	55	−7	36 (Note: Varketili were deducted 6 points.)	
6	Samegrelo Chkhorotsku	27	9	3	15	34	46	−12	30	
7	Odishi Zugdidi	27	8	5	14	42	46	−4	29	
8	Magaroeli Chiatura	27	8	4	15	29	45	−16	28	
9	Algeti Marneuli	27	7	4	16	37	51	−14	25 (Note: Being formally registered in Marneuli, FC Algeti played their all home matches in Tbilisi.)	
10	Imereti Khoni	27	3	2	22	25	74	−49	11	

Updated to match(es) played on 14 November. Source:
Rules for classification: 1) Points; 2) Head-to-head points; 3) Head-to-head goal difference; 4) Head-to-head goals scored; 5) Head-to-head away goals scored (only if two teams); 6) Goal difference; 7) Goals scored.
