= Giorgi Janelidze =

Georgian footballer (born 1989)

Personal information
- Full name: Giorgi Janelidze
- Date of birth: 25 September 1989 (age 37)
- Place of birth: Tbilisi, Georgia
- Height: 1.79 m (5 ft 10 1/2 in)
- Position: Midfielder

Team information
- Current team: Aragvi
- Number: 17

Senior career*
Years	Team	Apps	(Gls)
2007–2012	WIT Georgia	106	(10)
2012	→ Neftekhimik (loan)	2	(0)
2012–2013	WIT Georgia	26	(5)
2014–2016	Dinamo Tbilisi	32	(0)
2016–2017	Sioni Bolnisi	13	(2)
2017–2018	Kolkheti-1913 Poti	33	(4)
2018–2019	Dinamo Batumi	56	(4)
2020	Torpedo Kutaisi	15	(0)
2021	Telavi	32	(1)
2022–2023	Shukura Kobuleti	60	(7)
2024–	Aragvi	54+	(7)

International career
2009	Georgia U21	3	(0)
2011	Georgia	1	(0)
- * Club domestic league appearances and goals as of 11 July 2026

Giorgi Janelidze (Georgian: გიორგი ჯანელიძე; born 25 September 1989) is a Georgian football player. He currently plays for Liga 2 club Aragvi as a midfielder in Georgia.

== International career ==
Giorgi Janelidze made his debut in a 2–0 friendly match against the Moldova national football team on 11 June 2011.

== Honours ==
=== Club ===
Dinamo Tbilisi

- Georgian League: 2013–14
- Georgian Cup: 2014
- Super Cup: 2014

Wit Georgia

- Georgian Cup: 2010
- Super Cup: 2010, Runner-up 2011
