= FC Telavi =

Georgian football club

Telavi
- Full name: Football Club Telavi
- Founded: July 19, 2016; 9 years ago
- Ground: Givi Chokheli Stadium; Telavi, Georgia
- Capacity: 12,000
- Chairman: Soso Grishikashvili
- Manager: Giorgi Mikadze
- League: Erovnuli Liga 2
- 2025: 8th of 10 (relegated)
- Website: fctelavi.ge
| Home colours | Away colours |

FC Telavi (Georgian: საფეხბურთო კლუბი თელავი) is a Georgian professional football club based in the city of Telavi, Kakheti. Following the 2025 season, they were relegated to Erovnuli Liga 2, the second tier of Georgian football.

In the early 2020s, Telavi spent successive six seasons in the top division.

While the municipal stadium named after Givi Chokheli awaits a thorough reconstruction, Telavi use Kavkasioni Arena as their home ground.

== History ==
=== First steps ===
The football club was founded in 2016 by former football players Irakli Vashakidze, Soso Grishikashvili and Aleksandre Amisulashvili. Telavi successfully completed their first season in Regionuli Liga in 2016 and earned a place in III division. The next year they finished 2nd in Group White and in promotion play-offs defeated Guria 3–2 on aggregate.

In 2018, Telavi took a foothold in Liga 2 coming 5th in the final table. In David Kipiani Cup Telavi eliminated four opponents, including Dila Gori, and reached the semifinals where they lost to Torpedo Kutaisi, the future champions of the competition.

The next year they booked another promotion play-off, beat Rustavi in both games and advanced to the Erovnuli Liga. With this result the team achieved three promotions within the four seasons. Also, after a twelve-year pause the first-tier football finally returned to the capital of Kakheti.

=== In Erovnuli Liga ===
Following this promotion, nine new players, including four foreigners, strengthened the squad for 2020. During their very first season the club was widely praised for decent performance. Having lost just two games out of 18, FC Telavi finished in the 6th place.

The next season began poorly. After being winless for 17 games Telavi seemed a primary candidate for relegation, which resulted in the exit of manager. Starting from mid-June the team experienced some revival, producing an unbeaten run for seven matches, including five wins. They secured six more victories in the last quarter of the season, leapfrogged the rivals and accomplished a great escape. With this achievement Giorgi Mikadze claimed the Manager of Erovnuli Liga Round 4 (October–December) award and received a nomination for Coach of the Season.

Despite a promising forecast to the season, things went awry in early 2023. By mid-season, with the club sitting bottom of the table, fourteen players had been released in a summer overhaul preceded by departure of two managers. Instead, more than a dozen of new players was brought led by Irakli Rukhadze, the top goalscorer for three consecutive seasons a few years earlier. Тhese changes brought an immediate impact. After the summer break Telavi won six of their eight games and climbed out of the relegation zone. As a result, when the Erovnuli Liga summed up part 3 (rounds 19–28) of the season, Giorgi Mikadze was recognized as best manager with three players - Begić, Guti and Rukhadze - named in the best eleven of the league.

Starting from 2023, Telavi fought three successive relegation battles against their 2nd division opponents. Their third playoff ended in a penalty shootout defeat to Meshakhte which resulted in their first demotion from an upper league.

== Statistics ==
=== Seasons ===
| Year | Division | Pos | P | W | D | L | GF | GA | Pts | Cup |
|---|---|---|---|---|---|---|---|---|---|---|
| 2017 | 3rd, White Group | 2_{/10} | 18 | 10 | 5 | 3 | 30 | 18 | 35 | 1/32 finals |
| 2017 | Promotion Group | 3_{/10} (Note: Defeated Guria 3–2 on aggregate in Liga 2/3 playoffs)↑ | 18 | 12 | 3 | 3 | 56 | 15 | 39 | 1/32 finals |
| 2018 | 2nd | 5_{/10} | 36 | 12 | 12 | 12 | 45 | 43 | 48 | 1/2 finals |
| 2019 | 2nd | 3_{/10} (Note: Beat Rustavi 3–1 on aggregate in Liga 1/2 playoffs)↑ | 36 | 19 | 6 | 11 | 70 | 36 | 63 | 1/8 finals |
| 2020 | 1st | 6_{/10} | 18 | 4 | 12 | 2 | 21 | 14 | 24 | 1/4 finals |
| 2021 | 1st | 6_{/10} | 36 | 12 | 8 | 16 | 35 | 53 | 44 | 1/8 finals |
| 2022 | 1st | 7_{/10} | 36 | 8 | 15 | 13 | 29 | 36 | 39 | 1/8 finals |
| 2023 | 1st | 8_{/10} (Note: Defeated Spaeri 5–1 on aggregate in Liga 1/2 playoffs) | 36 | 10 | 7 | 19 | 34 | 62 | 37 | 1/8 finals |
| 2024 | 1st | 9_{/10} (Note: Beat Rustavi 3–2 on aggregate in Liga 1/2 playoffs) | 36 | 8 | 10 | 18 | 32 | 43 | 34 | 1/4 finals |
| 2025 | 1st | 8_{/10} (Note: Lost to Meshakhte on penalties in Liga 1/2 playoffs) ↓ | 36 | 9 | 9 | 18 | 36 | 59 | 36 | 1/16 finals |

=== Top goalscorers ===
| Season | Div. | Player | Goals |
|---|---|---|---|
| 2018 | 2nd | (Georgia (country)) Giorgi Nikabadze | 10 |
| 2019 | 2nd | (Georgia (country)) Irakli Rukhadze | 16 |
| 2020 | 1st | (Georgia (country)) Irakli Rukhadze | 5 |
| 2021 | 1st | (Georgia (country)) Irakli Rukhadze | 7 |
| 2022 | 1st | (Georgia (country)) Imeda Ashortia (Georgia (country)) Giorgi Kvernadze | 3 |
| 2023 | 1st | (Georgia (country)) Imeda Ashortia (Georgia (country)) Irakli Rukhadze | 6 |
| 2024 | 1st | (Georgia (country)) Tornike Morchiladze (Serbia) Dejan Georgijević | 6 |
| 2025 | 1st | (Georgia (country)) Mikheil Basheleishvili (Spain) Inigo Martin | 5 |

=== Managerial history ===
| Name | From | To |
|---|---|---|
| (Georgia (country)) Giorgi Dekanosidze | 2017 | 2018 |
| (Ukraine) Denys Khomutov | 2019 | 2019 |
| (Georgia (country)) Revaz Gotsiridze | 2019 | 2021 |
| (Georgia (country)) Giorgi Mikadze | 2021 | 2021 |
| (Georgia (country)) Giorgi Chelidze | 2022 | 2022 |
| (Georgia (country)) Giorgi Tsetsadze | 2022 | 2023 |
| (Armenia) Vardan Minasyan | 2023 | 2023 |
| (Georgia (country)) Giorgi Mikadze (2) | 2023 | 2023 |
| (Greece) Georgios Kostis | 2023 | 2023 |
| (Russia) Oleg Vasilenko | 2024 | 2024 |
| (Armenia) Armen Adamyan | 2024 | 2024 |
| (Cyprus) Pambos Christodoulou | 2024 | 2024 |
| (Georgia (country)) Valery Gagua | 2025 | 2025 |
| (Georgia (country)) Giorgi Mikadze (3) | 2026 | |

== Current squad ==
As of 17 March 2026

Note: Flags indicate national team as defined under FIFA eligibility rules; some limited exceptions apply. Players may hold more than one non-FIFA nationality.

| No. | Pos. | Nation | Player |
|---|---|---|---|
| 1 | GK | UKR | Oleksiy Shevchenko |
| 3 | DF | GEO | Aleko Ananidze |
| 4 | DF | GEO | Piruz Marakvelidze (captain) |
| 5 | DF | GEO | Piruz Gabitashvili |
| 6 | DF | GEO | Luka Salukvadze |
| 7 | MF | GEO | Giorgi Chkhetiani |
| 8 | MF | GEO | Andria Devdariani |
| 9 | FW | GEO | Jaduli Iobashvili |
| 10 | FW | GEO | Giorgi Nikabadze |
| 11 | DF | GEO | Tato Zhividze |
| 13 | DF | GEO | Nikoloz Galakhvaridze |

| No. | Pos. | Nation | Player |
|---|---|---|---|
| 14 | FW | GEO | Giorgi Ivaniadze |
| 17 | MF | GEO | Saba Geguchadze |
| 19 | MF | GEO | Davit Kutalia |
| 21 | MF | GEO | Nikoloz Kipiani |
| 22 | DF | GEO | Davit Gogotishvili |
| 23 | DF | GEO | Archil Datuashvili |
| 27 | MF | GUI | Josef Kakara |
| 29 | MF | GEO | Eldar Parkinashvili |
| 34 | MF | GEO | Giorgi Talakhashvili |
| 39 | GK | CAN | Aiden Rushenas |

== Management ==
=== Ownership ===
The club is governed by shareholders. Currently, 33% of the share belongs to chairman Soso Grishikashvili while the rest have been purchased by Armenian businessmen Vardan Hakopian and Tigran Hakobian.

Telavi received the first Armenian investment in March 2023.

=== Coaching positions ===
| Position | Name |
|---|---|
| Head coach | Giorgi Mikadze |
| Assistant coach | |
| Fitness coach | |
| Goalkeeping coach | Bukhu Odikadze |
| First-team analyst | Andro Giorgobiani |

== Sponsors ==
In early 2018, FC Telavi signed a sponsorship contract with m2 Development company.

In late 2022, the club announced a partnership deal with a wine-producing company based in Telavi.

== Stadium ==
Givi Chokheli football ground is home to FC Telavi, although the club played most of their home games in the last several seasons at 2,000-seater Kavkasioni Rugby Arena.

In October 2020, local authorities made a presentation on construction plans for a brand new stadium.
