= FC Samgurali Tskaltubo =

Samgurali Tskaltubo
- Full name: Football Club Samgurali Tskaltubo
- Founded: 1945; 81 years ago
- Ground: 26 May Stadium
- Capacity: 3,500
- Owner: Mikheil Iashvili
- Coach: Giorgi Oniani
- League: Erovnuli Liga
- 2025: Erovnuli Liga, 7th of 10
- Website: fcsamgurali.ge
Home colours	Away colours	Third colours

FC Samgurali (Georgian: საფეხბურთო კლუბი სამგურალი) is a Georgian association football club from Tskaltubo, which takes part in the Erovnuli Liga, the first tier of Georgian football.

They have been runners-up of the Georgian Cup three times.

== History ==
=== In Soviet and national leagues ===
Formed in 1945 as FC Medic, the football club from Tskaltubo had the most prolific years in the 1980s. Between 1983 and 1990 under the name Shadrevani 83 they became champions of the Georgian Soviet league three times, once finished as runners-up and once won bronze medals.

When the Georgian Football Federation formed an independent championship in 1990, Samgurali spent eight out of the initial ten seasons in the top flight. In 1999/2000, they finished in the drop zone and left the league. In this period the team experienced the worst decade in their history as they ceased to exist for four years.

Samgurali gained promotion to the second division in 2010 and stayed there as a stable member for nine successive seasons. The team finished as group runners-up in the 2016 transitional tournament, when the promotion rule was suspended. Two years later they slipped into the relegation zone after the last round. Worse was yet to come, as Samgurali suffered a play-off defeat on away goals.

Despite this setback, following the club's purchase by new owners in the summer of 2019, ambitious promotion plans were unveiled. It took Samgurali a year to climb back to Liga 2. The team came 2nd in the regular season and secured a convincing victory in both play-off ties. The next season brought another triumph. The club prevailed over their opponents again in both games and returned to the first tier after an eighteen-year break. This double promotion in two consecutive years was achieved under head coach Ucha Sosiashvili.

Due to his impressive performance in the league, striker Sergo Kukhianidze became the first Samgurali player who was called up to the national team for friendly games in June 2021.

In 2022, Samgurali had a memorable season, which could have resulted in their first top-league medals since 1990. As primary contenders for the third place, the team needed to play at least a draw in the final day of the season against rivals Dila Gori. But they threw away this initial advantage and ended up fourth for the second time in their recent history.

=== Georgian Cup ===
Apart from winning promotion to Erovnuli Liga, the team in 2020 also achieved an impressive success by reaching the final of the David Kipiani Cup for the first time since 1999. As in the previous case though, they again lost the final game on penalty shoot-out.

Nor the third attempt made the next year was fruitful. Having won four away games en route to the final, Samgurali were defeated in the regular time with a narrow margin.

=== Seasons ===
Season	Div	Pos	P	W	D	L	GF	GA	Pts	Top scorer	Goals	Cup
1990	UL	14_{/18}	34	11	6	17	42	57	39			R3
1991	UL	11_{/20}	19	7	3	9	21	34	24			–
1991/92	UL	12_{/20}	38	14	6	18	41	55	48			R1
1992/93	UL	4_{/17}	32	18	4	10	73	51	58	Merab Megreladze	41	QF
1993/94	UL, West	8_{/8}	14	1	1	12	12	42	4			QF
1993/94	11-19 Places	14_{/19}	16	9	1	6	27	29	28			QF
1994/95	UL	16_{/16}↓	30	5	6	19	30	68	21			R1
1995/96	PL	1_{/20}↑	38	33	3	2	132	28	102			DNE
1996/97	UL	11_{/16}	30	10	5	15	35	54	35			R2
1997/98	UL	12_{/16}	30	9	7	14	31	50	34			R1
1998/99	UL	11_{/16}	30	10	3	17	32	57	33			RU
1999/2000	UL, A	7_{/8}	14	3	2	9	9	27	11			R1
1999/2000	9-16 Places	13_{/16}↓	14	8	3	3	17	8	33			R1
2000/01	PL	6_{/12}	22	12	3	7	38	40	39			QF
2000/01	1-6 Places	3_{/6}↑	10	5	3	2	13	7	38			QF
2001/02	UL	12_{/12}	22	3	5	14	16	37	14			R2
2001/02	7-12 Places	11_{/12}↓	10	5	1	4	11	10	23			R2
2002/03	PL	4_{/16}	30	15	8	7	42	26	53			R1
2003/04	PL	2_{/16}	30	17	7	6	39	19	58			R2
The club was dissolved in 2005-2009
2010/11	PL	14_{/17}	32	8	6	18	38	64	30			DNE
2011/12	PL	7_{/10}	18	6	5	7	27	23	23	Giorgi Bukhaidze	7	DNE
2012/13	PL	6_{/12}	30	13	7	10	59	48	46	Tornike Kapanadze	27	R1
2013/14	PL	7_{/14}	26	11	6	9	49	49	39	Giorgi Bukhaidze	14	R1
2014/15	PL	4_{/10}	36	19	3	14	76	50	60	Giorgi Tevdoradze	17	R1
2015/16	PL	6_{/18}	34	16	3	15	60	46	51	Giorgi Tevdoradze	17	DNE
2016	PL	2_{/9}	16	10	2	4	29	24	32	Mamuka Gongadze	8	R1
2017	L2	4_{/10}	36	16	5	15	46	46	53	Gaga Chkhetiani	12	R5
2018	L2	8_{/10}↓	36	12	5	19	40	56	41	Gaga Chkhetiani	12	R3
2019	L3	2_{/10}↑	36	21	7	8	52	29	70	Sergo Kukhianidze	16	R2
2020	L2	2_{/10} ↑	18	8	6	4	23	12	30	Sergo Kukhianidze	7	RU
2021	EL	7_{/10}	36	9	14	13	34	46	41	Sergo Kukhianidze	11	RU
2022	EL	4_{/10}	36	15	12	9	55	44	57	Irakli Rukhadze	13	R3
2023	EL	5_{/10}	36	16	9	11	53	51	57	Giorgi Nikabadze	9	SF
2024	EL	5_{/10}	36	11	11	14	51	49	44	Luka Khorkheli	11	R4
2025	EL	7_{/10}	36	12	6	18	54	53	42	Giorgi Pantsulaia	17	R4

Key to league record:

P = Played

W = Games won

D = Games drawn

L = Games lost

F = Goals for

A = Goals against

Pts = Points

Pos = Final position

Key to divisions:

- PL = Pirveli Liga
- L2 = Erovnuli Liga 2
- L3 = Liga 3
- EL = Erovnuli Liga
- UL = Umaglesi Liga

Key to rounds:

- DNE = Did not enter
- R1 = Round 1
- R2 = Round 2
- R3 = Round 3
- R4 = Round 4
- R5 = Round 5
- QF = Quarterfinals
- SF = Semifinals
- RU = Runners-up

=== Honours ===
- Georgian Soviet Championship
  - Champion: 1983, 1985, 1989
- Georgian Soviet Cup
  - Champion: 1988, 1989
- Georgian Cup:
  - Runners-up: 1999, 2020, 2021
- Erovnuli Liga 2
  - Champion: 1996
  - Silver Medal winner: 1997, 2004, 2020
  - Bronze Medal winner: 2001

=== Top scorers ===
With 41 goals scored in the 1992/93 season, Merab Megreladze has been the leading goalscorer not only in the history of Samgurali, but also in the Georgian top football division since its creation in 1990.

== Current squad ==
As of 15 August 2026

Note: Flags indicate national team as defined under FIFA eligibility rules; some limited exceptions apply. Players may hold more than one non-FIFA nationality.

No.	Pos.	Nation	Player
1	GK	GEO	Luka Kutaladze
4	DF	GEO	Omar Patarkatsishvili
5	MF	GEO	Irakli Janjgava
6	MF	GEO	Otar Aptsiauri
7	MF	GEO	Nika Khorkheli
8	MF	GEO	Irakli Bidzinashvili
9	MF	GEO	Tornike Gaprindashvili
10	MF	NGR	Luqman Gilmore
11	FW	GEO	Davit Krasovski
12	GK	GEO	Anzor Kasradze
13	DF	GEO	Levan Gegetchkori
15	FW	BRA	Gean Rodrigues
17	DF	GEO	Nikoloz Tsetskhladze

No.	Pos.	Nation	Player
18	MF	GEO	Saba Chkhetiani
19	FW	GEO	Irakli Siradze
20	MF	BRA	Vinícius Vianna
21	GK	RUS	Arsen Siukayev
22	MF	GEO	Gigi Gogia
25	DF	GEO	Mate Shatirishvili (on loan from Dinamo Tbilisi)
26	MF	GEO	Zaza Iashvili
27	DF	GEO	Lasha Shergelashvili (C)
28	FW	BRA	Cláudio Cebolinha
29	DF	GEO	Nika Manjgaladze
33	MF	BRA	Isak Martins
39	DF	BRA	Ryan

=== Out on loan ===
Note: Flags indicate national team as defined under FIFA eligibility rules; some limited exceptions apply. Players may hold more than one non-FIFA nationality.

No.	Pos.	Nation	Player

== Managers ==
- (Georgia (country)) Giorgi Gogiashvili (August 2011 – July 2016)
- (Georgia (country)) Gia Gigatadze (August 2016 – May 2018)
- (Georgia (country)) Besik Khachiperadze (May 2018 – January 2019)
- (Georgia (country)) Mikheil Makhviladze (January – September 2019)
- (Georgia (country)) Ucha Sosiashvili (September 2019 – April 2021)
- (Georgia (country)) Samson Pruidze (April – December 2021)
- (Georgia (country)) Giorgi Mikadze (December 2021 – December 2022)
- (Georgia (country)) Giorgi Chelidze (January – September 2023)
- (Ukraine) Oleksandr Poklonskyi (October – December 2023)
- (Georgia (country)) Mikheil Ashvetia (December 2023 – October 2024)
- (Italy) Rodolfo Vanoli (October 2024 – May 2025)
- (Brazil) Thiago Gomes (May 2025 – January 2026)
- (Georgia (country)) Giorgi Oniani (since January 2026)

== Other teams ==
Samgurali have several teams participating in different youth tournaments. The reserve team known as Samgurali-2, which has recently spent one season in the third division, won Regionuli Liga Group West in 2021 and became a member of Liga 4.

== Stadium ==
The local football ground named after 26 May, the Georgian Independence Day, has undergone a several-phase reconstruction since 2018. After individual seats were installed, the arena has the capacity of 3,500.
