= FC Tori Borjomi =

Georgian football club

Tori Borjomi
- Full name: FC Tori
- Nickname: Torelebi
- Founded: 2016
- Ground: Jemal Zeinklishvili Stadium
- Capacity: 4,000
- League: Currently suspended

FC Tori (Georgian: საფეხბურთო კლუბი თორი) is defunct a Georgian football club based in Borjomi.

They completed five seasons in lower leagues of Georgian football and started participating in Regionuli Liga East Group in 2021, but after twelve matches withdrew from the tournament.

== History ==
The first football club, emerged in Borjomi in 1936, for many years participated in Georgian regional championship under the names Borjomi or Tori and later, between 2005 and 2009, in Umaglesi Liga as FC Borjomi.

While FC Borjomi represented the city in Liga 2, in July 2016 FC Tori was officially established by veteran football players on the basis of Borjomi's Sport School. They started competing in Meore Liga, the third division of the Georgian league system in 2016, when the Georgian Football Federation decided to switch back to Spring-Autumn system and with this aim organized a shortened transitional tournament.

Tori spent the next four seasons in Regionuli Liga, initially the fourth division, which became the fifth tier following the creation of Liga 4 in 2019.

In 2020, the team finished in the 11th place among 14 clubs. The next year a severe financial crisis hit Tori, which resulted in their withdrawal from the league.

== Seasons ==
Year	League	Pos	M	W	D	L	GD	P
2016	Meore Liga C Group	4th	14	6	3	5	22-15	21
2017	Regionuli Liga C Group	6th	22	8	3	11	39-61	27
2018	Regionuli Liga C Group	8th	20	5	3	12	26-61	18
2019	Regionuli Liga B Group	4th	16	9	3	4	36-35	30
2020	Regionuli Liga C Group	11th	13	4	0	9	23-41	12
2021	Regionuli Liga East							

== Stadium ==
The club played home games at the Jemal Zeinklishvili stadium, which was shared with FC Borjomi.

In September 2020, the City Hall of Borjomi announced that the football ground would undergo some reconstruction works next year.

== Derby ==
With FC Borjomi competing in an upper league, the two teams of the city never encountered during a regular season. However, in March 2019 their paths converged in the 2nd round of the David Kipiani Cup. En route to this game, Tori had prevailed over Meskheti and Chkherimela with an 18–0 aggregate score, but they suffered a defeat in the derby and crashed out of the tournament.
