= Soso Grishikashvili =

Georgian goalkeeper (born 1971)

Personal information
- Full name: Ioseb Grishikashvili
- Date of birth: 25 December 1971 (age 54)
- Place of birth: Telavi, Georgian SSR, Soviet Union
- Height: 1.88 m (6 ft 2 in)
- Position: Goalkeeper

Senior career*
Years	Team	Apps	(Gls)
1992–1993	Kakheti Telavi	63	(0)
1994–1995	Metalurgi Rustavi	15	(0)
1995–1996	Spartak-Alania Vladikavkaz	3	(0)
1997–1998	Ventspils	32	(0)
1999	Alania Vladikavkaz	0	(0)
1999–2002	Dinamo Tbilisi	37	(0)
2002–2003	Kolkheti-1913 Poti	6	(0)
2003	Lokomotivi Tbilisi	10	(0)
2004–2005	Tbilisi	27	(0)
2005	→ Dinamo Batumi (loan)	17	(0)
2005	FK Baku	2	(0)
2006–2008	Dinamo Tbilisi	29	(0)
2008–2010	FC Mika	33	(0)
2010–2011	Spartaki Tskhinvali	30	(0)
2011–2012	Dinamo Tbilisi	3	(0)

International career
1994–2000	Georgia	10	(0)
- * Club domestic league appearances and goals

Ioseb "Soso" Irodis dze Grishikashvili (Georgian: იოსებ (სოსო) იროდის ძე გრიშიკაშვილი, Ioseb (Soso) Irodis dze Grishik'ashvili; born 25 December 1971) is a Georgian former football goalkeeper.

== Career ==
He played for Dinamo Tbilisi, FK Ventspils, FK Baku. He has played for Georgia national football team and has won 10 caps, all in friendlies.
