= Chkhorotsqu =

Chkhorotsku ჩხოროწყუ
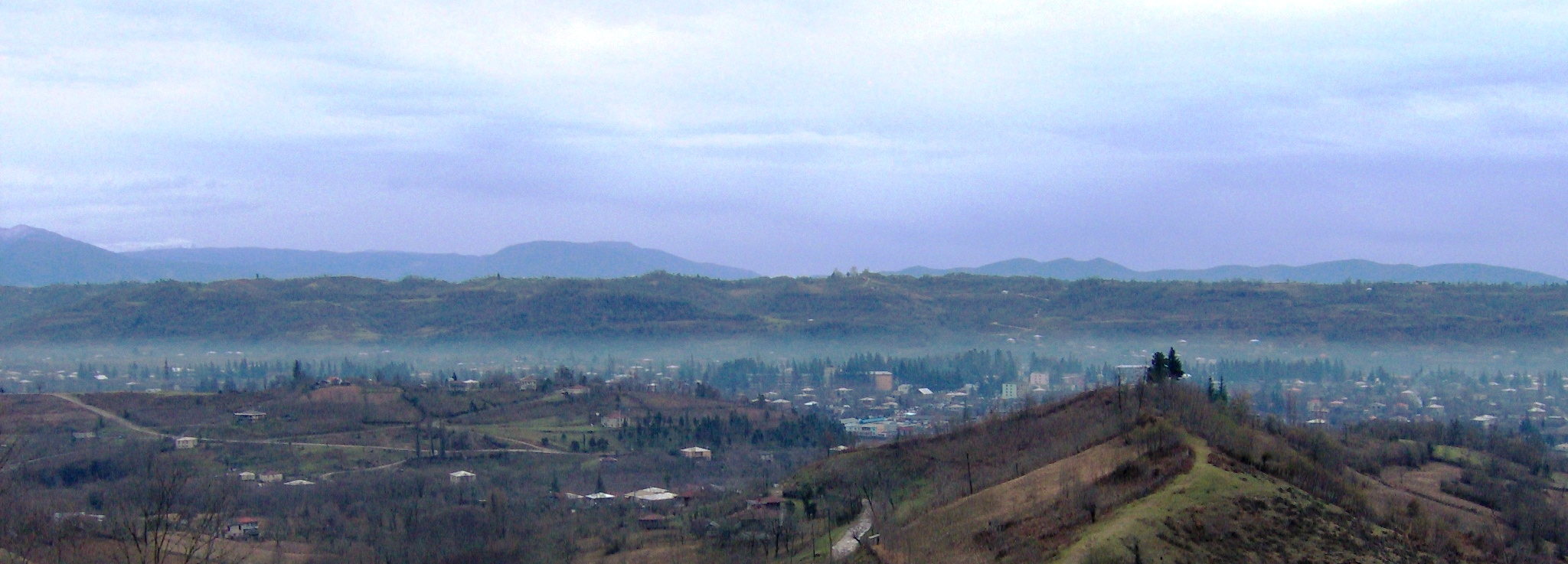

- Location of Chkhorotsqu in Georgia Chkhorotsku (Samegrelo-Zemo Svaneti)
- Coordinates: 42°31′20″N 42°7′45″E
- Country: Georgia
- Mkhare: Samegrelo-Zemo Svaneti
- District: Chkhorotsqu

Area
  - Total: 619.7 km^{2} (239.3 sq mi)
- Elevation: 180 m (590 ft)

Population (2026)
  - Total: 20,677
- Time zone: UTC+4 (Georgian Time)

Chkhorotsqu or Chkhorotsku (Georgian: ჩხოროწყუ, Mingrelian for "nine springs") is a townlet in western Georgia, located in the region of Samegrelo-Zemo Svaneti and functioning as the administrative center of the homonymous district. Its population was 3,141 as of 2014 (including over 1,500 IDPs from breakaway Abkhazia).

== Notable residents ==
- Gogita Gogua, footballer

== See also ==
- Samegrelo-Zemo Svaneti
