= FC Borjomi =

- Full name: FC Borjomi
- Founded: 1936
- Ground: Jemal Zeinklishvili Stadium; Borjomi, Georgia
- Capacity: 4,000
- Chairman: Koba Tediashvili
- Manager: Malkhaz Latsabidze
- League: Liga 4
- 2025: 15th of 16 in Liga 3 (relegated)
| Home colours | Away colours |

FC Borjomi (Georgian: საფეხბურთო კლუბი ბორჯომი) is a Georgian football club based in Borjomi. Following the 2025 season, they were relegated to Liga 4, the fourth tier of the Georgian football.

The team has spent four seasons in the top flight.

Their home ground is the Jemal Zeinklishvili Stadium.

== History ==
Founded in 1936, FC Borjomi participated in the Georgian regional championship for many years.

From 1993–94 they spent several seasons in the second and third division. In 2004–05, Borjomi finished 2nd in Liga 2 and secured promotion to Umaglesi Liga, where the club competed for four seasons.

The fifth place in 2005/06 is the best result Borjomi have achieved in Georgian leagues. It is noteworthy that the club won 14 home games out of 15, including against the top three leaders.

In the 2007/08 season, Borjomi won the group stage of the David Kipiani Cup and reached the semifinals, but the next year the club finished in the bottom place and left the league.

A few years later, Borjomi experienced some significant revival. Having convincingly won the third division in 2014, the next year the team achieved great progress towards the top league. As the runners-up, they booked a place for promotion play-offs against Locomotive. This dramatic final match ended 3–3 and the winner of the tie was determined after the penalty shoot-out.

Shortly some harsh times followed with two relegations within four seasons. Borjomi sank to a low ebb in 2019 when they failed to preserve a place in the third division. Аs a result, the head coach was replaced and 90% of players parted ways with the club.

In 2021, the club won the first stage of Liga 4 competition, qualified for the Promotion Group and managed to advance back to the third league from the third place. This time Borjomi remained in the league for four seasons before suffering the drop in 2025.

== Seasons ==
| Season | League | Pos. | P | W | D | L | GF | GA | Pts | Cup |
|---|---|---|---|---|---|---|---|---|---|---|
| 1993/94 | Pirveli Liga East | 13 | 34 | 12 | 5 | 17 | 48 | 59 | 41 | – |
| 1994/95 | Pirveli Liga East | 10 | 30 | 9 | 4 | 17 | 47 | 70 | 31 | – |
| 1995/96 | Pirveli Liga East | 19 | 36 | 5 | 4 | 27 | 31 | 78 | 19 | – |
| 1996/97 | Pirveli Liga East | 7 | 38 | 21 | 4 | 13 | 51 | 52 | 67 | 2nd Round |
| 1998/99 | Pirveli Liga East | 9 | 26 | 9 | 2 | 15 | 36 | 42 | 29 | Preliminary Round |
| 2000/01 | Pirveli Liga | 7 | 22 | 8 | 5 | 9 | 22 | 19 | 29 | – |
| 2000/01 | Relegation Round | 2 | 10 | 5 | 2 | 3 | 12 | 8 | 32 | – |
| 2001/02 | Pirveli Liga | 12↓ | 22 | 2 | 1 | 19 | 16 | 68 | 7 | – |
| 2002/03 | Regionuli Liga Centre | | | | | | | | | – |
| 2003/04 | Regionuli Liga Centre | ↑ | | | | | | | | – |
| 2004/05 | Pirveli Liga | 2↑ | 30 | 22 | 3 | 5 | 74 | 36 | 69 | 1st round |
| 2005/06 | Umaglesi Liga | 5 | 30 | 19 | 2 | 9 | 50 | 26 | 59 | Quarterfinals |
| 2006/07 | Umaglesi Liga | 10 | 26 | 8 | 6 | 12 | 29 | 35 | 30 | Quarterfinals |
| 2007/08 | Umaglesi Liga | 9 | 26 | 9 | 4 | 13 | 32 | 39 | 31 | Semifinals |
| 2008/09 | Umaglesi Liga | 11↓ | 30 | 2 | 7 | 21 | 21 | 85 | 13 | Round of 32 |
| 2013/14 | Meore Liga | 1↑ | 30 | 24 | 5 | 1 | 107 | 25 | 77 | – |
| 2014/15 | Pirveli Liga B | 2 | 30 | 16 | 6 | 14 | 40 | 43 | 54 | – |
| 2015/16 | Pirveli Liga | 4 | 34 | 17 | 10 | 7 | 45 | 32 | 61 | – |
| 2016 | Pirveli Liga | 3↓ | 16 | 8 | 1 | 7 | 22 | 17 | 22 | 2nd Round |
| 2017 | Liga 3 White | 4 | 18 | 7 | 7 | 4 | 22 | 17 | 28 | 2nd Round |
| 2017 | Relegation Group | 3 | 18 | 8 | 6 | 4 | 30 | 21 | 30 | 2nd Round |
| 2018 | Liga 3 | 7 | 38 | 18 | 7 | 13 | 66 | 56 | 61 | 1st Round |
| 2019 | Liga 3 | 9↓ | 36 | 12 | 3 | 21 | 30 | 57 | 39 | Round of 32 |
| 2020 | Liga 4 Red Group | 3 | 14 | 7 | 2 | 5 | 27 | 13 | 21 | 2nd Round |
| 2021 | Liga 4 Red Group | 1 | 18 | 13 | 3 | 2 | 46 | 16 | 42 | 2nd Round |
| 2021 | Promotion Group | 3↑ | 18 | 11 | 3 | 4 | 30 | 19 | 36 | 2nd Round |
| 2022 | Liga 3 | 8 | 30 | 12 | 5 | 13 | 47 | 40 | 41 | 1st Round |
| 2023 | Liga 3 | 11 | 30 | 11 | 2 | 17 | 50 | 78 | 35 | 2nd Round |
| 2024 | Liga 3 | 12 | 30 | 8 | 4 | 18 | 31 | 58 | 28 | 3rd Round |
| 2025 | Liga 3 | 15↓ | 30 | 6 | 5 | 19 | 34 | 60 | 23 | 1st Round |

== Current squad ==
As of 25 April 2026

Note: Flags indicate national team as defined under FIFA eligibility rules; some limited exceptions apply. Players may hold more than one non-FIFA nationality.

| No. | Pos. | Nation | Player |
|---|---|---|---|
| 1 | GK | GEO | Saba Shalikashvili (C) |
| 4 | DF | GEO | Dudu Ghibradze |
| 5 | DF | GEO | Sandro Chaduneli |
| 6 | MF | GEO | Beka Chaduneli |
| 7 | FW | GEO | Mikheil Mikeladze |
| 8 | MF | GEO | Shota Museridze |
| 9 | FW | GEO | Vasiko Shalikashvili |
| 10 | MF | GEO | Luka Lortkipanidze |
| 13 | DF | GEO | Nikoloz Mamatsashvili |

| No. | Pos. | Nation | Player |
|---|---|---|---|
| 14 | MF | GEO | Tsotne Samushia |
| 15 | DF | GEO | Luka Chikhladze |
| 16 | GK | GEO | Tsotne Tsotsonava |
| 17 | DF | GEO | Guram Shetsiruli |
| 19 | FW | GEO | Saba Sanadze |
| 20 | DF | GEO | Lasha Chikvaidze |
| 21 | DF | GEO | Giorgi Sturua |
| 24 | MF | GEO | Saba Lortkipanidze |
| 25 | FW | GEO | Davit Apkhazishvili |

== Managers ==
| Name | Nat. | From | To |
|---|---|---|---|
| Koba Tediashvili | (Georgia (country)) | 2018 | 2019 |
| Malkhaz Latsabidze | (Georgia (country)) | 2020 | 2022 |
| Gocha Avsajanishvili | (Georgia (country)) | 2022 | 2022 |
| Giorgi Macharadze | (Georgia (country)) | 2023 | 2023 |
| Malkhaz Latsabidze | (Georgia (country)) | 2023 | 2023 |
| Konstantine Asanidze | (Georgia (country)) | 2023 | 2025 |
| Davit Vardiashvili | (Georgia (country)) | 2025 | 2025 |
| Malkhaz Latsabidze | (Georgia (country)) | 2026 | |

== Honours ==
Pirveli Liga

- Runners-up: 2004–05, 2014–15 (Group B)
- 3rd place: 1999–2000 (Group A), 2016

== Stadium ==
The club's home ground is a stadium named after Borjomi-born player Jemal Zeinklishvili, who started his career at his hometown club and later spent seven seasons at Dinamo Tbilisi, becoming the Soviet Top league winner in 1964.

The arena was announced unfit for hosting official matches in 2020, which forced the local municipal authorities to unveil reconstruction plans. For this reason, since 2021 the team has been using other football grounds such as Mtskheta Park and the Grigol Jomartidze stadium for their home games.

In March 2024, an eighteen-month rehabilitation project was announced.

== Name ==
The club bore the name Tori between 1936 and 2004.

The term Tori comes from a medieval name of the region where Borjomi and surrounding areas are situated.

FC Tori, another football club based in Borjomi, competed in Regionuli Liga between 2016 and 2022.
