= Municipal Stadium (Telavi) =

Multi-use stadium in Telavi, Georgia

Givi Chokheli Stadium გივი ჩოხელის სტადიონი
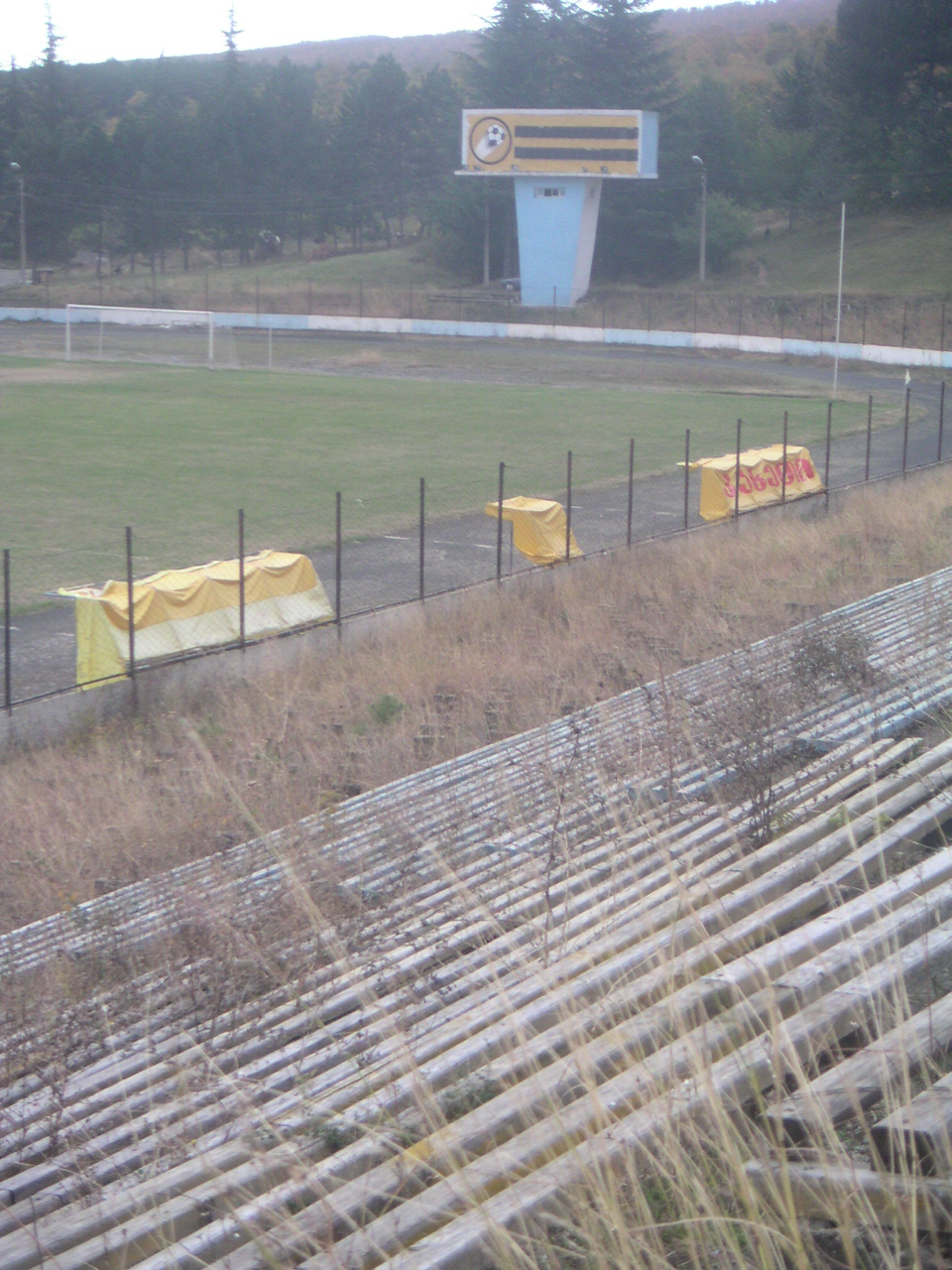
- Interactive map of Givi Chokheli Stadium გივი ჩოხელის სტადიონი
- Coordinates: 41.911650°N 45.480824°E
- Owner: Government of Georgia
- Capacity: 12,000
- Surface: Grass
- Scoreboard: Yes
- Field size: 105 m × 70 m (344 ft × 230 ft)

Tenant
- FC Kakheti Telavi

Givi Chokheli Stadium is a multi-use stadium in Telavi, Georgia. It is used mostly for football matches and is the home stadium of FC Kakheti Telavi. The stadium is able to hold 12,000 people. The statue of Georgian footballer and Telavi native Givi Chokheli stands in front of the stadium.

== See also ==
Stadiums in Georgia
