= 2021 Liga 3 (Georgia) =

Football season in Georgia

Liga 3
- Season: 2021
- Dates: 2 April – 2 December 2021
- Champions: Spaeri
- Promoted: Spaeri
- Relegated: Magaroeli; Didube
- Matches: 182
- Goals: 548 (3.01 per match)
- Top goalscorer: Levan Papava (Spaeri) 22 goals
- Biggest home win: Spaeri 7-1 Didube, 18 May
- Biggest away win: Didube 0-10 Saburtalo-2, 2 December
- Highest scoring: Didube 0-10 Saburtalo-2, 2 December
- Longest winning run: Spaeri (9)
- Longest unbeaten run: Spaeri (21)
- Longest winless run: Magaroeli (15)
- Longest losing run: Didube (9)

The 2021 Liga 3 was the fifth season under its current title and the 33rd season of third tier football in Georgia. The season began on 2 April and ended on 2 December.

== Team changes ==
The following teams have changed division since the previous season:

=== To Liga 3 ===
Promoted from Liga 4

Varketili Tbilisi • Merani-2 Tbilisi • Didube Tbilisi • Magaroeli Chiatura

=== From Liga 3 ===
Promoted to Erovnuli Liga 2

Gareji Sagarejo

== Teams and league table ==
Locations of Liga 3 football clubs in 2021

This year fourteen clubs took part in a two-round league competition. Their list along with head coaches is shown below. Throughout the year only four teams did not sustain any changes among coaching staff.

| Clubs | Position in 2020 | Location | Region | Head coach |
|---|---|---|---|---|
| Aragvi | 10th in Liga 2 | Dusheti | Mtskheta-Mtianeti | Paata Gotsiridze; Koba Jorjikashvili after June |
| Bakhmaro | 9th | Chokhatauri | Guria | Khariton Chkhatarashvili; Paata Metreveli after May |
| Didube | 1st in Liga 4 Group Red | Tbilisi | Tbilisi | Roin Oniani; Shota Gorgodze after October |
| Gori | 3rd | Gori | Shida Kartli | Davit Shubitidze |
| Guria | 5th | Lanchkhuti | Guria | Giga Imedaishvili; Giorgi Oniani after October |
| Kolkheti-1913 | 2nd | Poti | Samegrelo-Zemo Svaneti | Giorgi Krasovski; Gia Gigatadze after June |
| Kolkheti | 6th | Khobi | Samegrelo-Zemo Svaneti | Zurab Pirtskhalaishvili; Levan Nodia after June |
| Magaroeli | 2nd in Liga 4 Group Red | Chiatura | Imereti | Paata Metreveli; Alexandre Khvedelidze; Jemal Lashkhi after November (Interim) |
| Merani-2 | 2nd in Liga 4 Group White | Tbilisi | Tbilisi | Irakli Shengelia |
| Meshakhte | 10th | Tkibuli | Imereti | Davit Machitidze; Davit Burkadze after June |
| Saburtalo II | 8th | Tbilisi | Tbilisi | Giorgi Chelidze; Temur Shalamberidze after August |
| Spaeri | 4th | Tbilisi | Tbilisi | Kakha Maisuradze |
| Tbilisi City | 7th | Tbilisi | Tbilisi | Giorgi Kutivadze; Lado Burduli after late April |
| Varketili | 1st in Liga 4 Group White | Tbilisi | Tbilisi | Nodar Gvichia |

== League table ==
| Pos | Team | Pld | W | D | L | GF | GA | GD | Pts | Promotion, qualification or relegation |
|---|---|---|---|---|---|---|---|---|---|---|
| 1 | Spaeri (C, P) | 26 | 20 | 4 | 2 | 79 | 20 | +59 | 64 | Promotion to the Erovnuli Liga 2 |
| 2 | Kolkheti 1913 | 26 | 14 | 7 | 5 | 54 | 28 | +26 | 49 | Qualification for the promotion play-offs |
| 3 | Tbilisi City | 26 | 13 | 6 | 7 | 46 | 30 | +16 | 45 | Qualification for the promotion play-offs |
| 4 | Varketili | 26 | 12 | 5 | 9 | 43 | 37 | +6 | 41 | |
| 5 | Aragvi | 26 | 12 | 4 | 10 | 37 | 32 | +5 | 40 | |
| 6 | Gori | 26 | 10 | 8 | 8 | 33 | 33 | 0 | 38 | |
| 7 | Saburtalo-2 | 26 | 10 | 8 | 8 | 53 | 36 | +17 | 38 | |
| 8 | Bakhmaro | 26 | 8 | 9 | 9 | 26 | 33 | −7 | 33 | |
| 9 | Kolkheti | 26 | 6 | 13 | 7 | 32 | 39 | −7 | 31 | |
| 10 | Meshakhte | 26 | 8 | 6 | 12 | 31 | 42 | −11 | 30 | |
| 11 | Guria | 26 | 8 | 5 | 13 | 33 | 44 | −11 | 29 | |
| 12 | Merani-2 | 26 | 8 | 4 | 14 | 33 | 50 | −17 | 28 | |
| 13 | Magaroeli (R) | 26 | 5 | 6 | 15 | 23 | 46 | −23 | 21 | Relegation to the Liga 4 |
| 14 | Didube (R) | 26 | 3 | 5 | 18 | 25 | 78 | −53 | 14 | Relegation to the Liga 4 |

Rules for classification: 1) Points; 2) Head-to-head points; 3) Head-to-head goal difference; 4) Head-to-head goals scored; 5) Head-to-head away goals scored (only if two teams); 6) Goal difference; 7) Goals scored.
(C) Champions; (P) Promoted; (R) Relegated

== Results ==
=== Regular season ===
| Home \ Away | ARA | BKH | DID | GOR | GUR | KKH | KOL | MAG | MR2 | MES | SB2 | SPA | TBC | VAR |
|---|---|---|---|---|---|---|---|---|---|---|---|---|---|---|
| Aragvi | | 0–1 | 2–1 | 2–0 | 4–2 | 0–0 | 1–1 | 3–0 | 2–0 | 3–1 | 2–1 | 0–2 | 0–1 | 2–3 |
| Bakhmaro | 1–0 | | 2–0 | 0–0 | 0–2 | 0–1 | 1–0 | 1–2 | 2–0 | 3–3 | 2–2 | 1–1 | 2–1 | 1–1 |
| Didube | 0–3 | 5–0 | | 0–2 | 0–4 | 2–2 | 0–1 | 0–0 | 2–3 | 5–2 | 0–10 | 1–7 | 0–4 | 3–2 |
| Gori | 0–1 | 3–1 | 0–0 | | 3–2 | 0–0 | 1–1 | 3–1 | 2–2 | 2–1 | 2–1 | 0–2 | 1–0 | 0–0 |
| Guria | 2–0 | 0–0 | 1–1 | 2–1 | | 1–4 | 0–3 | 2–1 | 1–1 | 0–1 | 2–1 | 2–4 | 0–2 | 0–2 |
| Kolkheti | 1–3 | 1–2 | 2–0 | 1–1 | 2–2 | | 1–4 | 0–0 | 3–2 | 2–0 | 1–1 | 1–1 | 1–1 | 1–3 |
| Kolkheti 1913 | 3–0 | 2–1 | 5–0 | 3–1 | 1–1 | 3–2 | | 5–0 | 2–2 | 3–2 | 4–3 | 0–2 | 3–0 | 5–1 |
| Magaroeli | 1–0 | 1–2 | 2–2 | 1–1 | 1–2 | 1–1 | 2–0 | | 0–1 | 2–3 | 3–1 | 0–0 | 2–3 | 0–1 |
| Merani-2 | 0–2 | 3–1 | 3–0 | 0–2 | 2–3 | 3–0 | 1–2 | 1–0 | | 0–1 | 0–1 | 1–7 | 2–1 | 1–3 |
| Meshakhte | 0–0 | 0–0 | 4–0 | 3–2 | 1–0 | 0–0 | 0–0 | 2–0 | 1–2 | | 2–2 | 0–3 | 0–3 | 1–0 |
| Saburtalo-2 | 1–2 | 0–0 | 1–0 | 2–3 | 2–1 | 1–1 | 1–1 | 5–1 | 3–0 | 5–3 | | 2–0 | 1–0 | 3–2 |
| Spaeri | 5–1 | 3–1 | 7–1 | 5–0 | 3–0 | 5–0 | 1–0 | 4–1 | 4–1 | 1–0 | 1–1 | | 2–3 | 2–1 |
| Tbilisi City | 4–4 | 1–1 | 4–2 | 2–1 | 2–1 | 0–0 | 3–1 | 0–1 | 2–2 | 1–0 | 2–1 | 1–2 | | 0–0 |
| Varketili | 1–0 | 1–0 | 5–0 | 0–2 | 2–0 | 3–4 | 1–1 | 3–0 | 3–0 | 3–0 | 1–1 | 1–5 | 0–5 | |

Legend: Blue = home team win; Yellow = draw; Red = away team win.

=== Promotion play-offs ===
First leg

7 December 2021
13:00 UTC+4

| Tbilisi City | 2–3 | WIT Georgia |
|---|---|---|
| Tatanashvili 26', 72' | Report | Zaridze 11'; Nachkebia 69'; Muzashvili 73' |

Gldanis Safexbutro Centri, Tbilisi
Referee: K.Giorgadze

Second leg

11 December 2021
13:00 UTC+4

| WIT Georgia | 2-1 | Tbilisi City |
|---|---|---|
| Muzashvili 20'; Nachkebia 45' | Report | Tatanashvili 27' |

Gldanis Safexbutro Centri, Tbilisi
Referee: B.Ninua

Tbilisi City lost 3-5 on aggregate

7 December 2021
15:00 UTC+4

| Rustavi | 0–0 | Kolkheti-1913 Poti |
|---|---|---|
| | Report |

Teknikuri Centri, Rustavi
Referee: B.Ninua
11 December 2021
13:00 UTC+4

| Kolkheti-1913 Poti | 1-1 (a.e.t.) | Rustavi |
|---|---|---|
| Chavchanidze 110' (o.g.) | Report | Kurmashvili 100' |

Fazisi Stadium, Poti
Referee: I.Kherkhadze

Kolkheti-1913 lost on the away goals rule
