= FC Bakhmaro =

FC Bakhmaro Chokhatauri
- Founded: 1950; 76 years ago
- Ground: Boris Paichadze Stadium, Chokhatauri
- Capacity: 2,000
- Coach: Mamuka Gongadze
- League: Liga 4
- 2025: 16th of 16 in Liga 3

FC Bakhmaro (Georgian: საფეხბურთო კლუბი ბახმარო) is a Georgian association football club based in Chokhatauri. Following the 2025 season, the club was relegated to Liga 4, the fourth tier of the national football system.

== History ==
FC Bakhmaro have never participated in the top division of Georgian football.

In the 1990s, they took part in the second league for several seasons and in the mid-2010s the club mostly played in the third division, where they usually stayed in top half of the table.

Despite coming 2nd in their group in 2016, Bakhmaro left the third tier in view of reorganization of the entire league system, which meant relegation for a vast majority of clubs. It took the team a year to win the Regional league tournament, the then fourth division, and return to Liga 3.

The next year the club had quite a memorable season. During the entire campaign up until the last matchday they were engaged in a fierce rivalry with Zugdidi for the first place. Eventually, as runners-up, Bakhmaro booked a place in promotion play-offs against Tskhinvali, although suffered a 4–1 aggregate defeat.

In 2019, the club yet again narrowly fell short of the promotion goal and since then switched to survival tasks. An awful run of form at the beginning of the next season brought Bakhmaro to the brink of relegation, although they stayed up only after some changes regarding the number of clubs were introduced in January 2021.

Likewise, in 2021 with one win in the initial ten matches the team hurtled towards the drop zone, which led to the replacement of manager. This time, though, they gradually improved the performance on the pitch and drifted to safety.

Bakhmaro's eight-year tenure in the 3rd division came to an end in 2025 when they finished rock bottom and suffered relegation to Liga 4.

== Seasons ==
| Season | League | Pos | P | W | D | L | GF | GA | Pts | Cup |
|---|---|---|---|---|---|---|---|---|---|---|
| 2014–15 | Meore Liga West | 6_{/15} | 28 | 14 | 4 | 10 | 53 | 48 | 46 | – |
| 2015–16 | Meore Liga West | 6_{/14} | 26 | 13 | 4 | 9 | 48 | 38 | 43 | – |
| 2016 | Meore Liga Group C | 2_{/7}↓ | 12 | 9 | 1 | 2 | 33 | 19 | 28 | – |
| 2017 | Regionuli Liga A West | 1_{/15}↑ | 28 | 21 | 5 | 2 | 78 | 19 | 68 | 2nd round |
| 2018 | Liga 3 | 2_{/20} | 38 | 25 | 7 | 6 | 78 | 40 | 79 | 1st round |
| 2019 | Liga 3 | 4_{/10} | 36 | 16 | 6 | 14 | 50 | 47 | 54 | 2nd round |
| 2020 | Liga 3 | 9_{/10} | 18 | 5 | 3 | 10 | 20 | 33 | 18 | 2nd round |
| 2021 | Liga 3 | 8_{/14} | 26 | 8 | 9 | 9 | 26 | 33 | 33 | 1st round |
| 2022 | Liga 3 | 10_{/16} | 30 | 10 | 8 | 12 | 38 | 42 | 38 | 1st round |
| 2023 | Liga 3 | 12_{/16} | 30 | 9 | 6 | 15 | 47 | 47 | 33 | 3rd round |
| 2024 | Liga 3 | 13_{/16} | 30 | 6 | 9 | 15 | 19 | 33 | 27 | 1st round |
| 2025 | Liga 3 | 16_{/16}↓ | 30 | 3 | 4 | 23 | 18 | 74 | 13 | 2nd round |

== Players ==
As of 25 April 2026

Note: Flags indicate national team as defined under FIFA eligibility rules; some limited exceptions apply. Players may hold more than one non-FIFA nationality.

| No. | Pos. | Nation | Player |
|---|---|---|---|
| 5 | DF | GEO | Davit Nutsubidze |
| 6 | MF | GEO | Nikoloz Khelidze |
| 8 | MF | GEO | Akaki Barkaia |
| 10 | MF | GEO | Guram Vardanidze |
| 11 | FW | GEO | Murtaz Khingava |
| 12 | GK | GEO | Aleksandre Ninua |
| 13 | DF | GEO | Nikoloz Vardanidze |
| 14 | FW | GEO | Rezo Javakhadze |
| 15 | DF | GEO | Ivane Gvenetadze |

| No. | Pos. | Nation | Player |
|---|---|---|---|
| 17 | DF | GEO | Giorgi Tkabladze |
| 18 | DF | GEO | Achiko Vekua |
| 20 | MF | GEO | Giorgi Chokheli |
| 23 | DF | GEO | Giorgi Dzigrashvili |
| 25 | GK | GEO | Giorgi Kandelaki |
| 26 | DF | GEO | Nika Kobulovi |
| 30 | MF | GEO | Levan Liparteliani (C) |
| 31 | FW | GEO | Giorgi Tedoradze |

== Managers ==
| Name | Nat. | From | To |
|---|---|---|---|
| Teimuraz Loria | (Georgia (country)) | 2017 | 2019 |
| Khariton Chkhatarashvili | (Georgia (country)) | 2019 | 2021 |
| Paata Metreveli | (Georgia (country)) | 2021 | 2021 |
| Teimuraz Loria | (Georgia (country)) | 2022 | 2024 |
| Tornike Gagua | (Georgia (country)) | 2024 | 2024 |
| Mamuka Gongadze | (Georgia (country)) | 2025 | – |

== Stadium ==
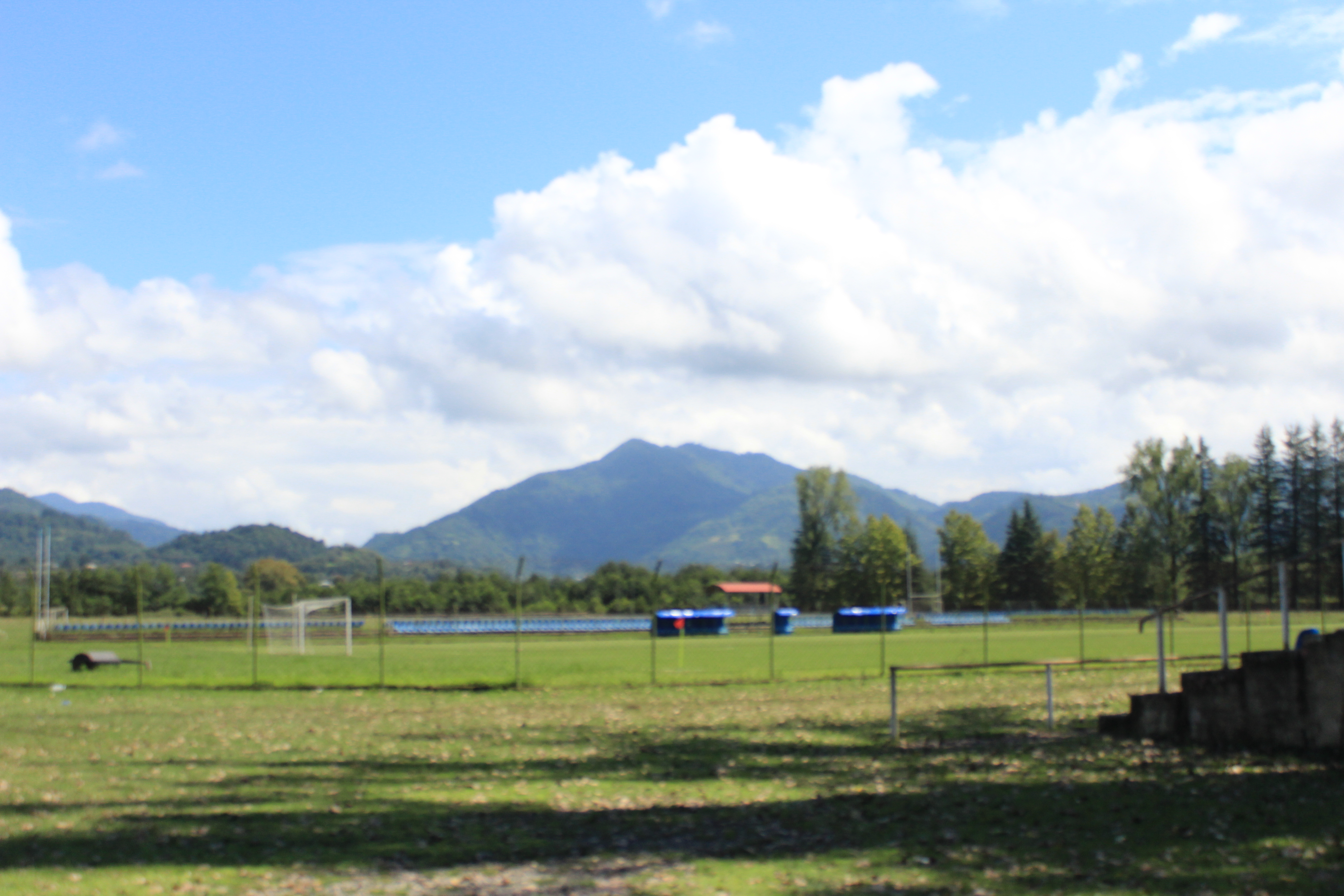
Boris Paichadze Stadium in Chokhatauri

The home of FC Bakhmaro is a stadium with the capacity of 2,000 seats, which is named after Boris Paichadze, the distinguished Georgian football player born in Chokhatauri. The stadium complex currently consists of two football pitches and a rugby playing field.

== Name ==
Bakhmaro is a famous alpine resort in the Chokhatauri municipality of Guria.
