= FC Gardabani =

- Full name: FC Gardabani
- Founded: 2015; 11 years ago
- Ground: Gardabani Central Stadium
- Chairman: Ahmad Saad Imam
- Manager: Guram Chvintiashvili
- Coach: Amiran Lomsadze
- League: Liga 3
- 2025: 11th of 16, Liga 3

FC Gardabani (Georgian: სკ გარდაბანი) is a Georgian association football club from the city of Gardabani.

Within less than a decade since joining Georgian football, Gardabani have had different years from the lowest division to the 2nd tier. They currently compete in Liga 3, the third tier of the national football system.

== History ==
Gardabani were established in 2015 as a municipal club. They won the regional league tournament in the very first season. Promoted to Liga 3, Gardabani took the 1st place amid a tight competition with Mtskheta and Tskhumi.

The club spent one year in the second division, which has been their highest point. After getting relegated, Gardabani took part in Liga 3 for two seasons.

They knocked out three teams during the 2018 cup campaign and reached the fourth round. But as early as in March 2018, players started complaining about lack of training facilities and financial means forcing them to leave the club. Beset with these problems, Gardabani were relegated to the fourth tier at the end of this season along with other nine teams that finished in the bottom half of the table. However, the club no longer participated in any league for next two years.

With the help of Egyptian investors, Gardabani resumed functioning in early February 2021. The new management also unveiled plans to create a football academy for children and form another team for the Amateur League.

In the first season, the club failed to gain promotion, although the next year turned out fruitful. In the cup, Gardabani defeated three opponents, including two third-tier members, and reached the fourth round, while in the league they topped the table from the start, won 22 matches out of 26 and accomplished their goal. The club continued a successful league campaign the next season as well. After a 2–0 away win over Sulori on the last matchday, they emerged victorious from a hard-fought battle for Liga 3 and achieved the second successive promotion.

== Seasons ==
Season	Division	Pos.	M	W	D	L	GF–GA	Pts	Domestic Cup
2015/16	Meore Liga, Group East	1st of 14↑	26	23	1	2	133–25	70	–
2016	Liga 2, Group Red	9th of 9↓	16	1	1	14	13–42	4	Round 2
2017	Liga 3, Group White	5th of 10	18	6	6	6	26–24	24	Round 3
2017	Promotion Group	4th of 10	18	9	4	5	40–18	31	Round 3
2018	Liga 3	17th of 20↓	38	11	6	21	39–63	39	Round 4
The club was dissolved in 2019–20
2021	Regionuli Liga, Group East	3rd of 24	23	16	4	3	58–20	52	–
2022	Regionuli Liga, Group B	1st of 14↑	26	22	2	2	110–19	68	Round 3
2023	Liga 4	3rd of 14↑	26	16	4	6	53–28	52	Round 2
2024	Liga 3	10th of 16	30	9	7	14	42–41	34	Round 1
2025	Liga 3	11th of 16	30	8	5	18	37–67	29	Round 1

== Squad ==
As of 20 March 2026

Note: Flags indicate national team as defined under FIFA eligibility rules; some limited exceptions apply. Players may hold more than one non-FIFA nationality.

No.	Pos.	Nation	Player
1	GK	GEO	Nikoloz Kalandarishvili
2	DF	GEO	Giorgi Bochorishvili
3	DF	GEO	Raul Gajiev
4	DF	GEO	Saba Diasamidze
5	DF	GEO	Emil Iskadarov (Captain)
6	MF	GEO	Lasha Shautidze
7	MF	GEO	Lasha Pezuashvili
8	MF	GEO	Nikoloz Grigolava
9	FW	GEO	Nikoloz Jamaspishvili
10	MF	GEO	Luka Okropilashvili

No.	Pos.	Nation	Player
11	FW	GEO	Gigi Gvenetadze
13	DF	GEO	Luka Nioradze
14	MF	BRA	Renan da Silva
15	DF	GEO	Archil Antelava
16	MF	GEO	Giorgi Bakuradze
17	MF	GEO	Giorgi Balarjishvili
18	FW	GEO	Tariel Tediashvili
19	FW	GEO	Giorgi Miruashvili
20	MF	GEO	Luka Mgebrishvili
40	GK	GEO	Pavle Todadze
—	FW	BRA	Roberto da Silva

== Honours ==
• Meore Liga

Winners (1): 2015–16

• Liga 4

Third place (1): 2023

• Regionuli Liga

Winners (1): 2022

== Other teams ==
Gardabani have a reserve team known as Gardabani-2 which entered the Regionuli Liga tournament in 2025.
