= FC Egrisi Senaki =

Egrisi Senaki
- Full name: Football Club Egrisi Senaki
- Founded: 1936; 90 years ago
- Ground: Central Stadioni; Senaki
- Capacity: 4,000
- Manager: Tornike Gagua
- League: Regionuli Liga C
- 2025: 15th of 16, Regionuli Liga, Group C

FC Egrisi (Georgian: საფეხბურთო კლუბი ეგრისი) is a Georgian association football club based in the town of Senaki. The club competes in Regionuli Liga, the fifth tier of the national football system.

The team has played one season in the top flight.

== History ==
The club had different names in the 1940–60s and as Spartaki, Gantiadi, Tsiskari and Kolkheti participated in the Georgian domestic league. In a most memorable event in 1970, they won the republican cup competition. Since then, the football club has been competing under the current name.

Egrisi played in Umaglesi Liga in the 1995–96 season, but they failed to retain their place in the league. The team has since been in low leagues with most of the seasons spent in the third division.

The club successfully concluded the regional league tournament in 2018. After Liga 4 was formed the next year, they were its participant for three consecutive seasons, although a poor performance in 2021 resulted in their relegation.

In their third successive season in Regionuli Liga, Egrisi under Besik Sherozia finished 2nd, four points adrift of group leaders Kolkheti-2, and reached the play-off stage of this tournament.

== Seasons ==
Year	League	Pos	M	W	D	L	GF–GA	Pts	Notes
2012–13	Meore Liga West	13th of 13	24	2	4	18	22-77	10	
2013–14	Meore Liga West	3rd of 13	24	16	0	8	53-35	48	
2014–15	Meore Liga West	8th of 15	28	11	6	11	55-57	39	
2015–16	Meore Liga West	5th of 14	26	14	4	8	55-34	46	
2016	Meore Liga Group B	6th of 8	14	5	2	7	15-23	17	Relegated
2017	Regionuli Liga, Group A West	12th of 16	28	8	6	14	43-61	30	
2018	Regionuli Liga, West C	2nd of 8	14	7	5	2	26-13	26	
2018	Promotion Group	1st of 8	14	10	0	4	34-17	30	Promoted
2019	Liga 4	4th of 10	27	14	2	11	49-43	44	
2020	Liga 4 White Group	7th of 8	14	2	4	8	23-47	10	
2021	Liga 4 Red Group	9th of 10	18	2	3	13	11-52	9	
2021	Relegation Round	10th of 10	18	1	3	14	12-66	6	Relegated
2022	Regionuli Liga, Group C	9th of 11	20	4	1	15	23-59	13	
2023	Regionuli Liga, Group C	4th of 13	24	13	4	7	58-38	43	
2024	Regionuli Liga, Group C	2nd of 13	24	19	2	3	82–25	59	Playoff (Note: Suffered a 4–1 defeat at the hands of Iberia 2010 in promotion play-offs)
2025	Regionuli Liga, Group C	15th of 16	30	3	5	22	32–92	14	

== Squad ==
As of 20 October 2026

Note: Flags indicate national team as defined under FIFA eligibility rules; some limited exceptions apply. Players may hold more than one non-FIFA nationality.

No.	Pos.	Nation	Player
1	GK	GEO	Gabriel Tebidze
2	DF	GEO	Nika Shurgaia
4	DF	GEO	Elguja Chakhaia
6	MF	GEO	Vazha Gelozia
7	FW	GEO	Aleko Tavshavadze
8	DF	GEO	Erekle Khuchua
9	FW	GEO	Irakli Pipia
10	FW	GEO	Giorgi Shengelia
11	FW	GEO	Tengo Pipia
14	MF	GEO	Shota Lomia
17	DF	GEO	Tengiz Jomidava

No.	Pos.	Nation	Player
18	MF	GEO	Irakli Kobalia
19	MF	GEO	Giorgi Bokuchava
20	DF	GEO	Ramin Gulua
22	MF	GEO	Ilia Bibileishvili
23	MF	GEO	Roman Gogia
30	DF	GEO	Lasha Kalandia (Captain)
—	DF	GEO	Luka Chichinadze
—	MF	GEO	Boris Adanaia
—	DF	GEO	Luka Tskhvaradze
—	DF	GEO	Beka Kakachia
—	GK	GEO	Amiko Minashvili

== Honours ==
Pirveli Liga

- Winners: 1994–95 (West)

== Name ==
Egrisi is a Georgian name for the ancient kingdom of Colchis, which covered the vast areas of contemporary Georgia.
