= FC Spaeri =

Spaeri
- Founded: 2017; 9 years ago
- Ground: Spaeri Stadium, Tbilisi
- Capacity: 2,500
- Chairman: Zurab Javakhishvili
- Manager: Anzor Kighuradze
- League: Erovnuli Liga
- 2025: 2nd of 10 in Liga 2 (promoted)
Home colours	Away colours	Third colours

FC Spaeri (Georgian: საფეხბურთო კლუბი სპაერი) is a Georgian professional association football club based in Tbilisi. Following the 2025 season, the club gained promotion to Erovnuli Liga, the top tier of Georgian football.

Along with Gagra, they are the only 2nd division club to have won the Georgian Cup.

== History ==
Spaeri was established in 2017 by five individuals working in the Special State Protection Service. The team mostly consisted of the servicemen of this organization and initially participated in the Tbilisi Open League - the then 5th (now 6th) and lowest level of the league pyramid before becoming a member of the Regionuli Liga.

Spaeri finished the 2018 season as runners-up and obtained the right to take part in the newly created Liga 4. Having won 21 games out of 27, they claimed the 2019 Liga 4 title and won automatic promotion to Liga 3.

Their debut in the third division was impressive with Spaeri vying for a promotion play-off place up until the last matchday. Eventually, the club came two points short of third place.

The team improved their performance in 2021 and, following an unbeaten run in 20 league games, won the 2021 Liga 3 title six rounds before the end of the season.

Initially, they did not seem encouraging in the second division. With a single point in their initial four matches, Spaeri were sitting bottom of the table. However, the team quickly recovered, produced the longest unbeaten streak of the season and qualified for the promotion play-offs by coming 2nd in the league. Forward Levan Papava became the top scorer of the league with 17 goals netted during the regular season. He added a brace in a dramatic promotion-relegation tie against Erovnuli Liga side Gagra but the team failed to secure promotion as Gagra won on penalties. Spaeri took part in playoffs a year later as well, only to lose to Telavi.

In 2024, Spaeri managed to win the Georgian Cup, defeating Dinamo Tbilisi in the final. Doing so, they qualified for their first time ever to European football, securing a spot in the 2025–26 UEFA Conference League second qualifying round. When Flashscore summed up European cup seasons in June 2025, it named Spaeri's triumph among the ten biggest "cupsets".

In their debut performance in the Super Cup, the team produced a dominant display over Torpedo Kutaisi to reach the final where they fell to a late defeat against Dila. Later in the same season, Spaeri qualified for Erovnuli Liga playoffs for the third time in four years. This time they cruised to a narrow victory over their 1st league rivals and advanced to the top league.

== Seasons ==
Season	League	Position	P	W	D	L	GF–GA	Pts	Cup
2017	Tbilisi Open League	1st of 9↑	21	19	2	0	112-18	59	Did not enter
2018	Regionuli Liga, Group A	2nd of 11↑	20	15	4	1	79-18	61	1st Round
2019	Liga 4	1st of 10↑	27	21	1	5	73-29	64	3rd Round
2020	Liga 3	4th of 10	18	9	3	6	31-20	30	3rd Round
2021	Liga 3	1st of 10↑	26	20	4	2	79-20	64	3rd Round
2022	Erovnuli Liga 2	2nd of 10 (Note: Lost to Gagra on penalties in League 1/2 playoffs)	28	15	6	7	57-35	51	Round of 16
2023	Erovnuli Liga 2	3rd of 10 (Note: Lost 5–1 on aggregate to Telavi in League 1/2 playoffs)	36	20	6	10	68-48	66	Round of 16
2024	Erovnuli Liga 2	5th of 10	36	14	9	13	50–47	51	Winners
2025	Erovnuli Liga 2	2nd of 10↑ (Note: Beat Gareji 3–2 on aggregate in League 1/2 playoffs)	30	17	13	6	54-34	64	Quarterfinals

== European competitions ==
Season	Competition	Round	Club	Home	Away	Aggregate
2025–26	UEFA Conference League	2nd qualifying round	Austria Vienna	0–2	0–5	0–7

== Current squad ==
16 March 2026

Note: Flags indicate national team as defined under FIFA eligibility rules; some limited exceptions apply. Players may hold more than one non-FIFA nationality.

No.	Pos.	Nation	Player
1	GK	GEO	Bukhuti Putkaradze
2	DF	GEO	Giorgi Pirtakhia
3	DF	GEO	Luka Kachibaia
4	MF	GEO	Giorgi Grigalashvili
5	MF	GEO	Temur Tsalugelashvili
6	MF	GEO	Tornike Askurava
7	MF	GEO	Saba Gegiadze
9	FW	GEO	Giorgi D.Tsetskhladze
10	MF	GEO	Tamaz Tsetskhladze
11	FW	GEO	Papuna Poniava
13	FW	RSA	Sienda Mathenjwa

No.	Pos.	Nation	Player
14	DF	GEO	Giga Samkharadze
16	DF	GEO	Saba Dzneladze
17	FW	GEO	Lasha Kokhreidze
19	MF	GEO	Gocha Tsirdava
20	DF	GEO	Nikoloz Kenchadze (c)
21	DF	GEO	Otar Gordeziani
22	MF	GEO	Nika Chagunava
23	GK	GEO	Nikoloz Chomakhidze
24	MF	GEO	Zurab Golubiani
27	GK	GEO	Luka Chakhnashvili
30	FW	GEO	Zakaria Basilashvili
31	MF	GEO	Giorgi Bunturi

== Managers ==
Name	Nat.	From	To
Kakha Maisuradze	(Georgia (country))	2017	2024
Anzor Kighuradze	(Georgia (country))	2024	

== Other teams ==
Spaeri has a youth academy with its teams taking part in different leagues and tournaments. The reserve team called Spaeri-2 competes in Regionuli Liga.

== Stadium ==
The Spaeri Stadium, located in an eastern suburb of Tbilisi, was officially opened in September 2018. Тhe pitch has an artificial turf.

== Honours ==
League

- Erovnuli Liga 2
  - Runners-up (2): 2022, 2025
  - Third place (1): 2023
- Liga 3
  - Winners (1): 2021
- Liga 4
  - Winners (1): 2019
- Regionuli Liga
  - Runners-up (1): 2018 (East A)
- Tbilisi Open League
  - Winners (1): 2017

Cup

- Georgian Cup
  - Winners (1): 2024
- Georgian Super Cup
  - Runners-up (1): 2025
