= Liga 3 (Georgia) =

Georgian association football league

- Founded: 2017; 9 years ago: 1990–2016 (as Meore Liga)
- Country: Georgia
- Confederation: UEFA
- Number of clubs: 16
- Level on pyramid: 3
- Promotion to: Erovnuli Liga 2
- Relegation to: Liga 4
- Domestic cup: Georgian Cup
- Current champions: Shturmi (1st title) (2025)
- Website: liga.gff.ge
- Current: 2026

Liga 3 (Georgian: ლიგა 3), organized by the Georgian Football Federation, is the third division of professional football in Georgia. Introduced for the 2017 season with the launch of the Erovnuli Liga, it is a rebrand of the former Meore Liga (the Second League).

The current holders are Shturmi.

== Structure and league system ==
There were 20 teams competing in the league in 2017. In 2019, when Liga 4 was formed, their number was reduced to ten, although after two seasons GFF decided to extend the league to 14 at the expense of two bottom teams from the previous season and two second-placed clubs from Liga 4 While and Red Groups. In 2022, the number of clubs was increased to 16.

Seasons run based on Spring-Autumn system with each team playing an equal amount of home and away games against their league rivals.

The league operates based on a system of promotion and relegation. Starting from the 2022 season, champions and runners-up win automatic promotion to Erovnuli Liga 2, while the teams that finish in the third and fourth positions book a place in promotion play-off home and away games against respectively the 8th and 7th placed clubs of Liga 2. Three bottom teams are relegated to Liga 4.

In case two or more clubs obtain the same number of points, their head-to-head records are next to be taken into consideration.

=== Number of teams each season ===
● 2017–18 = 20

● 2019–20 = 10

● 2021 = 14

● Since 2022 = 16

== Current members ==
Locations of Liga 3 football clubs in 2026

Sixteen teams will be competing in the 2026 season. Half of them are based in Tbilisi. Five clubs, namely Guria, Kolkheti, Locomotive, Merani and WIT Georgia have previously played in the top division with the latter being the two-time national champions. There are also two reserve teams of higher league members this season. Locomotive, Iberia 2010 and Iveria are making their debut in the league.

The clubs are listed below in alphabetical order.

Clubs	Position last season	Location	Region
Betlemi	10th	Keda	Adjara
Didube	8th	Tbilisi	Tbilisi
Dinamo Tbilisi-2	10th in Liga 2	Tbilisi	Tbilisi
Gardabani	11th	Gardabani	Kvemo Kartli
Gonio	9th in Liga 2	Batumi	Adjara
Guria	3rd in Liga 4	Lanchkhuti	Guria
Iberia 1999 B	8th in Liga 2	Tbilisi	Tbilisi
Iberia 2010	1st in Liga 4	Tbilisi	Tbilisi
Iveria	2nd in Liga 4	Khashuri	Shida Kartli
Kolkheti	14th	Khobi	Samegrelo
Locomotive	7th in Liga 2	Tbilisi	Tbilisi
Margveti 2006	12th	Zestaponi	Imereti
Merani Tbilisi	9th	Tbilisi	Tbilisi
Orbi	7th	Tbilisi	Tbilisi
Tbilisi 2025	5th	Tbilisi	Tbilisi
WIT Georgia	6th	Tbilisi	Tbilisi

== Results ==
=== Group Winners of Meore Liga ===
Season	West	East	Center
2011–12	Chikhura II	Sasco	—
2012–13	Matchakhela	Kartli 2011	—
2013–14	Lazika	Borjomi	—
2014–15	Imereti	Tskhumi	Liakhvi Tskhinvali
2015–16	Sulori	Gardabani	Mark Stars
2016	Betlemi ● Margveti ● Samegrelo	Algeti ● N.Dinamo ● Shevardeni ● Telavi	Gori

Note: Due to the season being transitional in 2016, none of the teams was promoted

=== Top three teams of Liga 3 ===
Season	Winner	Runner-up	Third place
2017	Shevardeni 1906	**Norchi Dinamo**	**Telavi**
2018	Zugdidi	Bakhmaro	**Guria**
2019	Merani Martvili	**Samgurali**	**Aragvi**
2020	Gareji	Kolkheti 1913	Gori
2021	Spaeri	Kolkheti 1913	Tbilisi City
2022	Dinamo Tbilisi-2	Kolkheti 1913	Aragvi
2023	Aragvi	Shturmi	Rustavi
2024	Gonio	Meshakhte	**Merani Martvili**
2025	Shturmi	Gori	**Odishi 1919**

Notes: Apart from the champions who were automatically promoted to the second division, the teams indicated in bold gained promotion after winning the play-offs against their Liga 2 rivals. Due to the changed format, since 2022 the runners-up of the seasons have been also promoted directly.

=== Relegated teams ===
The number of relegated teams per each recent season varies due to the fact that the competition format is subject to frequent changes.

Season	Clubs
2017	Odishi 1919 ● Chkherimela ● Liakhvi ● Sapovnela
2018	Samegrelo ● Magaroeli ● Varketili ● Algeti ● Mark Stars ● Imereti ● Gardabani ● Sulori ● Samgurali-2 ● Matchakhela
2019	Borjomi ● Betlemi
2020	NONE
2021	Magaroeli ● Didube
2022	Tbilisi City*
2023	Merani-2 ● Chikhura
2024	Zestaponi ● Matchakhela ● Guria
2025	Locomotive-2 ● Borjomi ● Bakhmaro

Note: Tbilisi City failed to obtain a league license for the 2023 season.

== Participation per club ==
There have been 49 teams in total competing in this league since 2017. Gori are topping the list with an overall ten-year continuous tenure in the third tier, including nine successive seasons after its re-branding as Liga 3.

Team	Par.
Gori	9
Bakhmaro	8
Iberia 1999 B	8
Kolkheti Khobi	8
Guria	7
Meshakhte	7
Borjomi	7
Tbilisi 2025	7
Aragvi	6
Betlemi	6
Gardabani	5
Orbi	5
Merani Tb	4
Merani-2 Tb	4
Didube	3
Kolkheti 1913	3

Team	Par.
Locomotive-2	3
Magaroeli	3
Margveti 2006	3
Matchakhela	3
Tbilisi City	3
Zestaponi	3
Algeti	2
Chikhura	2
Dinamo-2	2
Gonio	2
Imereti	2
Mark Stars	2
Merani M	2
Odishi 1919	2
Samegrelo	2
Spaeri	2

Team	Par.
Sulori	2
WIT Georgia	2
Chkherimela	1
Zugdidi	1
Gareji	1
Iberia 2010	1
Iveria	1
Liakhvi	1
Locomotive	1
Rustavi	1
Samgurali	1
Samgurali-2	1
Sapovnela	1
Shturmi	1
Skuri	1
Shevardeni 1906	1
Telavi	1

As of 2026 their current status is:

Erovnuli Liga	4
Erovnuli Liga 2	8
Liga 3	16
Liga 4	6
Regionuli Liga	7
Defunct	8
