= FC Imereti Khoni =

Imereti Khoni
- Full name: FC Imereti Khoni
- Founded: 1936
- Ground: Ipolite Khvichia stadium
- Capacity: 1,500
- Manager: Dato Chelidze
- League: Regionuli Liga
- 2025: 9th of 16, Regionuli Liga, Group C

FC Imereti (Georgian: საფეხბურთო კლუბი იმერეთი) is a Georgian association football club from the town of Khoni. They currently take part in Regionuli Liga, the fifth tier of the national league system.

== History ==
Founded in 1936, Imereti spent many years in Georgian Soviet championship under the name Imereti Tsulukidze. The second division has been the highest league they participated at any time since 1990.

In 2014/15 Imereti, trained by manager Koba Zhorzhikashvili, won a tight competition against Sulori Vani for promotion to Pirveli Liga. The club pledged to become promotion chasers for the top flight and carry out some reconstruction of the stadium, which was regularly overcrowded during the matches.

In the next season the club performed below expectations, but still with positive prospect looming ahead. However, near the end of 2016 Imereti were delivered a severe blow. The Disciplinary Committee of Georgian Football Federation upon completion of its investigation on a possible match-fixing incident involving Imereti decided to annul the latter's points in the league table and expel the club to a lower division. The manager was sentenced to a life-long ban on any football activities.

Back in the third league the club quickly recovered and took part in the promotion round. Simultaneously, Imereti set their own historic record by reaching the fifth round of David Kipiani Cup after having eliminated upper league teams Sioni Bolnisi and Merani Tbilisi. But in the semifinal game they were beaten by Chikhura Sachkhere, who later clinched the Cup title.

In 2018, Imereti finished in the relegation play-off zone and defeated Regionuli Liga group winner Dinamo Batumi-2 in a two-legged tie for Liga 4. Their troubles continued in this division as well, although two decisions made by GFF regarding the league format in the next two years saved the club from further relegation.

In the 2021 season, the team still failed to finish above the drop zone and slumped to the bottom of the Georgian football leagues.

== Seasons ==
Season	League	Pos.	MP	W	D	L	GF–GA	P	Notes
2014/15	Meore Liga West	1st of 15	28	24	3	1	89-11	75	Promoted
2015/16	Pirveli Liga	13th of 18	34	10	11	13	34-53	41	
2016	Pirveli Liga Group White	8th of 9	16	4	3	9	20-29	0	Relegated
2017	Liga 3 Red Group	2nd of 10	18	9	6	3	20-10	33	
2017	Promotion Round	6th of 10	18	5	6	7	13-26	21	
2018	Liga 3	16th of 20	38	12	9	17	44-52	45	Relegated
2019	Liga 4	10th of 10	27	3	2	22	25-74	11	
2020	Liga 4 Red Group	7th of 8	14	4	1	9	16-24	13	
2021	Liga 4 Red Group	10th of 10	18	2	3	13	12-51	9	Relegated
2021	Relegation Round	9th of 10	18	2	2	14	13-53	8	Relegated
2022	Regionuli Liga, Group C	7th of 11	20	8	1	11	32-47	25	
2023	Regionuli Liga, Group C	6th of 13	24	11	2	11	60-41	35	
2024	Regionuli Liga, Group C	6th of 13	24	9	3	12	45-58	30	
2025	Regionuli Liga, Group C	9th of 15	30	12	4	14	72-57	40	

== Honours ==
• Meore Liga

Winners (1): 2014–15 (Group West)

== Stadium ==
Imereti play home matches at a municipal stadium with the capacity of 1,500 seats, named after Ipolite Khvichia, the distinguished Georgian actor born in Khoni district.

== Name ==
Imereti is the name of the province where Khoni is located.
