= FC Samegrelo Chkhorotsku =

- Full name: FC Samegrelo Chkhorotsku
- Founded: 1980
- Ground: Bondo Papaskiri central Stadium; Chkhorotsku
- Capacity: 1,500
- Manager: Gizo Shengelia
- League: N/A

FC Samegrelo (Georgian: საფეხბურთო კლუბი სამეგრელო) is a defunct Georgian football club based in the town of Chkhorotsku. Most recently they competed in Regionuli Liga, the fifth tier of the Georgian league system.

The Bondo Papaskiri central stadium was Samegrelo's home ground.

== History ==
Founded in 1980, the club has not participated in the Georgian top flight.

In unique circumstances Samegrelo once took part in Pirveli Liga. In the middle of the 2014–15 season, they replaced Sasco, who had withdrawn from the competition due to financial troubles. As the team failed to stay up in the league, though, they spent the next three years in the third tier.

Samegrelo won C Group of Meore Liga in 2016. However, not a single team gained promotion in this transitional season.

According to existing regulations in 2018, despite coming 11th among 20 league teams, Samegrelo dropped down to Liga 4, where they remained for four seasons.

Starting from 2020, Samegrelo battled against a further relegation. In the first year, they avoided this fate only after the league was subjected to the reorganization, which included the increase of teams from 16 to twenty. In the next year the club initially performed so poorly that they seemed hopeless in their survival battle. However, having won seven matches in the relegation round with a large margin, Samegrelo under head coach Paata Bukia comfortably finished in the fourth place.

But in 2022, they ended up in the relegation zone and joined other three sides bound for Regionuli Liga.

== Recent seasons ==
| Year | League | Pos | M | W | D | L | GF–GA | Pts | Notes |
|---|---|---|---|---|---|---|---|---|---|
| 2012/13 | Meore Liga Group West | 10th of 13 | 24 | 5 | 5 | 14 | 25-77 | 20 | |
| 2013/14 | Meore Liga Group West | 12th of 13 | 24 | 4 | 3 | 17 | 23-64 | 15 | |
| 2014/15 | Meore Liga Group West | 4th of 15 | 28 | 16 | 3 | 9 | 58-37 | 51 | |
| 2015/16 | Pirveli Liga | 15th of 18 | 34 | 10 | 8 | 16 | 32-50 | 38 | Relegated |
| 2016 | Meore Liga Group C | 1st of 7 | 12 | 10 | 1 | 1 | 37-12 | 31 | |
| 2017 | Liga 3 Red Group | 5th of 10 | 18 | 6 | 9 | 3 | 20-14 | 27 | |
| 2017 | Promotion Round | 10th of 10 | 18 | 1 | 5 | 12 | 12-61 | 8 | |
| 2018 | Liga 3 | 11th of 20 | 38 | 13 | 9 | 16 | 63-55 | 48 | Relegated |
| 2019 | Liga 4 | 6th of 10 | 27 | 9 | 3 | 15 | 34-46 | 30 | |
| 2020 | Liga 4, Red Group | 8th of 8 | 14 | 2 | 2 | 10 | 12-36 | 8 | |
| 2021 | Liga 4 White Group | 10th of 10 | 18 | 2 | 2 | 14 | 11-88 | 8 | |
| 2021 | Relegation Group | 4th of 10 | 18 | 10 | 1 | 7 | 44-43 | 31 | |
| 2022 | Liga 4 | 14th of 16 | 30 | 9 | 1 | 20 | 44-62 | 28 | Relegated |
| 2023 | Regionuli Liga | 13th of 13 | 24 | 1 | 1 | 22 | 28-180 | 4 | |
| 2024 | Did not enter | | | | | | | | |
| 2025 | Regionuli Liga | 16th of 16 | 30 | 0 | 1 | 29 | 21-171 | 1 | |

== Honours ==
Meore Liga

Winners (1): 2016 (Group C, West)

== Name ==
Samegrelo is a Georgian name for the region where Chkhorotsku is situated.
