= FC Aragvi Dusheti =

FC Aragvi
- Full name: Football Club Aragvi Dusheti
- Founded: 1954
- Chairman: Giorgi Khubejashvili
- Manager: Davit Kokiashvili
- League: Liga 2
- 2025: 4th of 16 (promoted)
Home colours	Away colours

FC Aragvi (Georgian: საფეხბურთო კლუბი არაგვი) is a Georgian association football club. Following the 2025 season, they were promoted to Erovnuli Liga 2, the 2nd tier of Georgian football.

Although registered in Dusheti, Aragvi have not played there since 2019, holding home matches in Mtskheta, Tbilisi and Sartichala instead.

== History ==
Established in 1954, during the Soviet period Aragvi mainly participated in the East group of Georgian republican league 2.

In the 2008–09 season, the team played in the Meore Liga. Shiola Shiolashvili led the team to first place in the third tier. In 2009–10 season the team had the opportunity to participate in the Pirveli Liga next year, but some financial problems made this goal unachievable. Although the city council stopped supporting Aragvi, which brought the club to the verge of collapse, the football school continued to exist and was awaiting a revival.

A few years later, the club was rebuilt but the financial problems could not be completely resolved. In an interview, Aragvi's general manager Soso Tchikaidze said that the help provided by the municipality was not enough to bring the team together.

In August 2017 it was confirmed that "Jaba Credit" had become the club's main sponsor. Since then Aragvi invited several new players. In 2017 Aragvi competed in Group B of the Regional League. The team finished second in the tournament table with 60 points. In playoffs Aragvi Dusheti defeated Skuri 2–1 and advanced to the Liga 3.

In 2018 the club made a debut in Liga 3 and was ranked sixth, guaranteeing survival in the league of twenty teams.

The next year they finished third, therefore, succeeding in qualification for play-offs against Erovnuli Liga 2 team Guria. Aragvi lost 0–1 at home, but emerged victorious over their opponents in the return leg after the overtime by a 2–1 aggregate score and advanced to the second tier.

The debut in this division in 2020, though, turned out unsuccessful. Aragvi finished bottom of the table and left the league. Their attempt to climb back there via promotion play-offs in 2022 ended in a narrow defeat although a year later Aragvi won the league on a goal advantage and gained promotion to the 2nd division.

For the second time in four years, the team failed to retain a place there beyond one year as they sustained a playoff defeat in a dramatic two-legged tie and returned to Liga 3.

Following the 2025 season, Aragvi changed the league once again after winning playoffs against Locomotive on penalties.

== Seasons ==
Year	Division	Position	MP	W	D	L	GF-GA	Pts	Notes
2017	Regionuli Liga; East B	2nd of 13	24	19	3	2	63-21	60	Play-off, promoted (Note: Beat Liga 3 side Skuri 2–1 in a Regionuli Liga/Liga 3 play-off game)
2018	Liga 3	6th of 20	38	19	4	15	64-55	61	
2019	Liga 3	3rd of 10	36	18	7	11	58-41	61	Play-offs, promoted (Note: Defeated Liga 2 side Guria on away goals rule in Liga 2/3 play-offs)
2020	Erovnuli Liga 2	10th of 10	18	1	5	12	10-49	8	Relegated
2021	Liga 3	5th of 14	26	12	4	10	37-32	40	
2022	Liga 3	3rd of 16	30	16	9	5	56-25	57	Play-offs, lost (Note: Lost to Liga 2 side WIT Georgia 1–0 on aggregate in Liga 2/3 play-offs)
2023	Liga 3	1st of 16	30	21	5	4	66-21	68	Promoted
2024	Erovnuli Liga 2	7th of 10	36	14	7	15	51-50	49	Play-offs, relegated (Note: Lost to Liga 3 club Iberia-2 1999 3–2 on aggregate in Liga 2/3 play-offs)
2025	Liga 3	4th of 16	30	19	6	5	79–35	63	Play-offs, promoted (Note: Beat Liga 2 side Locomotive on penalties in Liga 2/3 playoffs)

== Squad ==
As of 19 March 2026

Note: Flags indicate national team as defined under FIFA eligibility rules; some limited exceptions apply. Players may hold more than one non-FIFA nationality.

No.	Pos.	Nation	Player
1	GK	GEO	Guram Chikashua
3	DF	GEO	Tornike Molashvili
4	DF	GEO	Aleksandre Tepnadze
5	DF	GEO	Luka Chokheli
6	MF	GEO	Ilchin Mekhtiev
7	FW	GEO	Davit Gabisonia
8	MF	GEO	Nikoloz Akhvlediani
9	FW	GEO	Emre Sadykov
10	MF	GEO	Levan Kobakhidze
11	MF	GEO	Shakro Dvalishvili
12	GK	GEO	Giorgi Kutateladze

No.	Pos.	Nation	Player
13	DF	GEO	Irakli Javakhishvili
14	DF	GEO	Irakli Zaridze
17	MF	GEO	Giorgi Janelidze
18	FW	GEO	Tengiz Bregvadze
19	MF	GEO	Giorgi Ksovreli
22	FW	GEO	Nika Kokosadze
23	MF	GEO	Amiran Devidze
24	DF	GEO	Temur Gognadze
26	DF	UZB	Murodjon Tuychibaev
27	MF	GHA	Baba Nuhu
30	MF	GEO	Tornike Bzekalava

== Management ==
Position	Name
Head coach	Davit Kokiashvili
Assistant coach	Papuna Gasviani
Sporting director	Ilia Vekua
Physiotherapist	Giorgi Giorgadze

== Honours ==
Liga 3

- Winners (1): 2023
- Third place (2): 2019, 2022

Regionuli Liga

- Runners-up (1): 2017 (East B)

== Other teams ==
Aragvi's reserve team known as Aragvi-2 started taking part in Regionuli Liga in 2024 and managed to reach the playoff stage, although conceded a 2–1 defeat from Iberia 2010. A year later, though, they won automatic promotion as Group A leaders.
