= 2026 Georgian Cup =

Davit Kipiani Cup
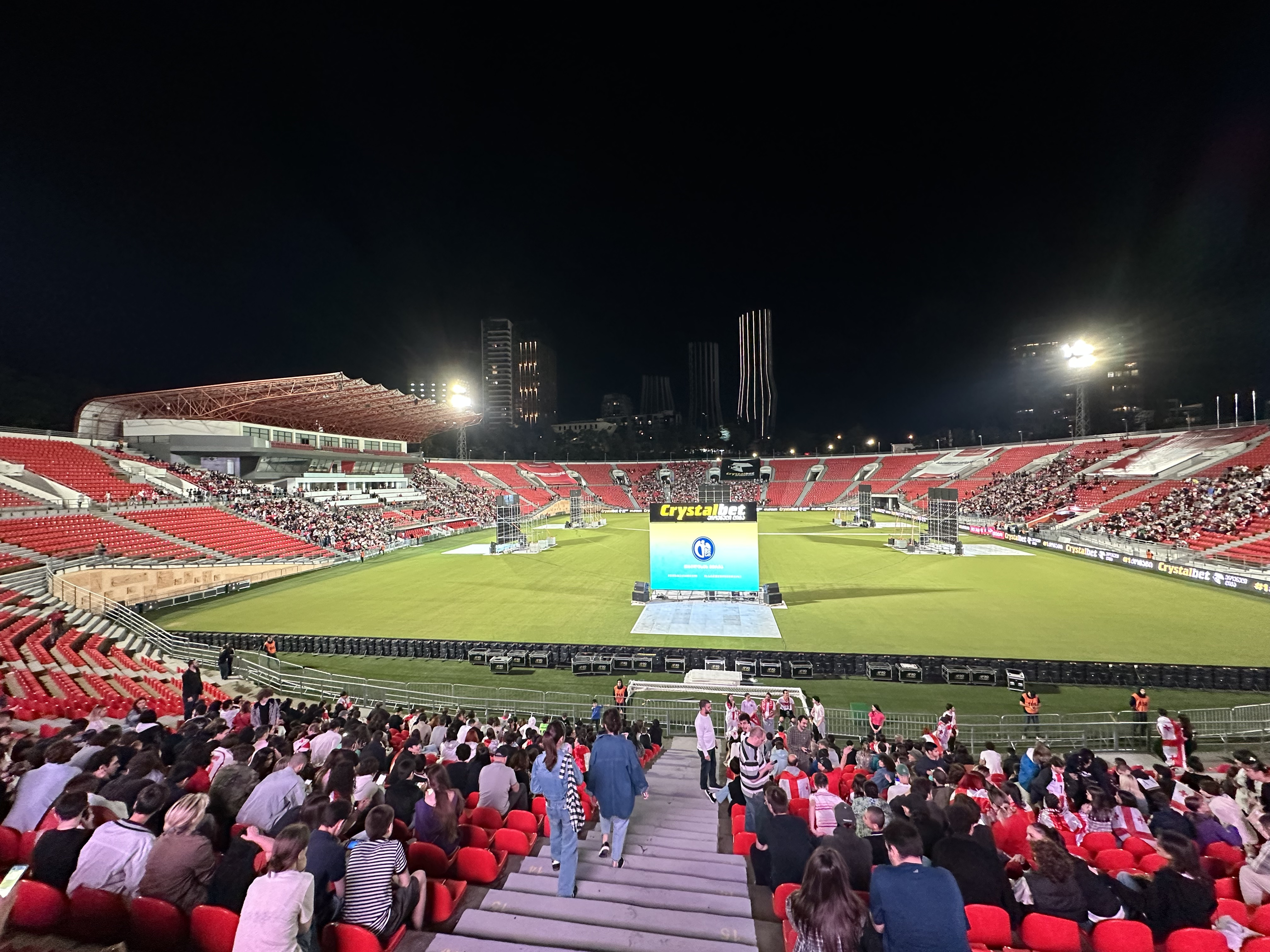
- Mikheil Meskhi Stadium where the 2026 Cup final will be held

Tournament details
- Country: Georgia
- Dates: 11 April - 12 December
- Teams: 80

Final positions
- Champions: TBD

Tournament statistics
- Matches played: 78
- Goals scored: 284 (3.64 per match)
- All statistics correct as of 28 October 2026.

The 2026 Georgian Cup, also called the Davit Kipiani Cup, is a single knock-out football tournament, organized by the Georgian Football Federation. The winner of this year's cup will earn the right to take part in the 2027–28 UEFA Conference League 1st qualifying round and the 2027 Georgian Super Cup.

Dila are the most recent title holders, having beaten Iberia 1999 in the 2025 Cup final.

In May, the Federation announced that the Mikheil Meskhi Stadium would host the final game of the tournament.

== Preliminary round ==
Sixteen matches of the preliminary round were played between 11 and 24 April 2026. Apart from 27 representatives of Regionuli Liga and four clubs of Liga 4, one slot was allocated for the 2025 Amateur League (AL) winner.

Team 1	Score	Team 2
11 April 2026
Gardabani-2 (5)	2–0	Qareli (4)
16 April 2026
Liakhvi Achabeti (5)	1–3	Zooveti (5)
Gori-2 (5)	2–3 (a.e.t.)	Dmanisi (5)
Rustavi-2 (5)	2–1	Machakhela (5)
17 April 2026
Meshakhte-2 (5)	2–1	Tskhumi (5)
Orbi-2 (5)	3–0	Zestaponi (5)
23 April 2026
Imereti (5)	4–0	Magharoeli (5)
Dinamo Sokhumi (5)	3–0	Merani Tbilisi-2 (5)
25 April 2026
Abuli (5)	5–1	Tbilisi 2025-2 (5)
Odishi-2 (5)	7–0	Sapovnela (5)
Mertskhali (4)	2–1	Machakhela (4)
26 April 2026
UG 35 (5)	3–4 (a.e.t.)	Aragvi-2 (4)
Norchi Dinamo (5)	1–7	Samtskhe (4)
Jvari (5)	3–1	Zana (5)
Dinamo Batumi-2 (5)	1–3	West Georgia (4)
Sulori (4)	0–1	Torpedo-2 (4)
Basa (AL)	2–1	Spaeri-2 (5)

== First round ==
The draw for the first and subsequent rounds took place on 4 May 2026. At this stage the remaining 12 teams from Liga 4 and four clubs of Liga 3 entered the competition.

Team 1	Score	Team 2
24 May 2026
Orbi-2 (5)	0–2	Iveria (3)
Locomotive-2 (4)	0–1	Samtskhe (4)
Rustavi-2 (5)	4–0	Borjomi (4)
Abuli (5)	0–1	Aragvelebi (4)
Dmanisi (5)	2–1 (a.e.t.)	Bakhmaro (4)
Samgurali-2 (4)	1–2	West Georgia (4)
Odishi-2 (5)	1–5 (a.e.t.)	Mertskhali (4)
Gardabani-2 (5)	1–4	Guria (3)
Imereti (5)	3–7	Gagra-2 (4)
Zooveti (5)	1–0	WIT Georgia-2 (4)
Torpedo-2 (4)	4–1	Kolkheti Khobi (3)
Aragvi-2 (4)	3–4	Iberia 2010 (3)
Jvari (5)	0–1	Skuri (4)
Meshakhte-2 (5)	2–2 (a.e.t.) (6–7 p)	Merani-2 (4)
Dinamo Sokhumi (5)	3–2	Algeti (4)
25 May 2026
Basa (AL)	2–1 (a.e.t.)	Kolkheti 1913 B (4)

== Second round ==
The 16 winners of the previous round are joined now by 12 members of Liga 3 and four teams of Erovnuli Liga 2 who secured promotion last year.

Team 1	Score	Team 2
24 June 2026
Rustavi–2 (5)	2–3	Orbi (3)
25 June 2025
Zooveti (5)	0–2	Aragvi (2)
26 June 2025
Skuri (4)	3–4	Dinamo Tbilisi–2 (3)
Merani Martvili–2 (4)	1–2	Iberia 1999 B (3)
Torpedo–2 (4)	0–4	Margveti 2006 (3)
Gardabani (3)	1–5	Iberia 2010 (3)
Gagra–2 (4)	1–2	Odishi 1919 (2)
Guria (3)	6–1	Merani Tbilisi (3)
Mertskhali (4)	1–3	Gori (2)
Samtskhe (4)	4–1	Didube (3)
West Georgia (4)	0–2	Shturmi (2)
Dmanisi (5)	0–3	WIT Georgia (3)
Aragvelebi (4)	0–4	Tbilisi 2025 (3)
Basa (AL)	2–1	Locomotive (3)
Iveria (3)	5–4 (a.e.t.)	Betlemi (3)
Dinamo Sokhumi (5)	0–3	Gonio (3)

== Third round ==
The remaining six clubs from the 2nd division and ten teams competing in the Erovnuli Liga enter the contest in the 3rd round, or Round of 32.

Team 1	Score	Team 2
24 July 2026
Margveti 2006 (3)	1–3	Iberia 1999 (1)
25 July 2026
Dinamo Tbilisi-2 (3)	1–5	Spaeri (1)
Gonio (3)	1–2	Meshakhte (1)
Kolkheti 1913 (2)	0–0 (a.e.t.) (3–4 p)	Aragvi (2)
Iberia 2010 (3)	0–1	Dila (1)
Orbi (3)	1–4	Dinamo Batumi (1)
Basa (AL)	0–2	Gareji (2)
Gori (2)	1–0	Sioni (2)
26 July 2026
Guria (3)	1–0	Dinamo Tbilisi (1)
Merani Martvili (2)	1–2	Odishi 1919 (2)
WIT Georgia (3)	2–2 (a.e.t.) (6–7 p)	Samgurali (1)
Iberia 1999 B (3)	0–1	Telavi (2)
Samtredia (2)	2–1	Shturmi (2)
Iveria (3)	1–3	Torpedo (1)
Tbilisi 2025 (3)	0–1	Rustavi (1)
27 July 2026
Samtskhe (4)	1–2	Gagra (1)

== Round of 16 ==
Team 1	Score	Team 2
1 August 2026
Samgurali (1)	1–0 (a.e.t.)	Meshakhte (1)
Torpedo (1)	4–1	Odishi 1919 (2)
Rustavi (1)	3–1 (a.e.t.)	Spaeri (1)
2 August 2026
Guria (3)	1–2	Aragvi (2)
Gareji (2)	1–4	Gagra (1)
Dinamo Batumi (1)	1–0	Telavi (2)
Gori (2)	0–2	Dila (1)
2 September 2026
Samtredia (2)	2–0	Iberia 1999 (1)

== Quarterfinals ==
Team 1	Score	Team 2
26 August 2026
Dila (1)	2–1 (a.e.t.)	Samgurali (1)
Gagra (1)	0–0 (a.e.t.) (4–3 p)	Aragvi (2)
Torpedo (1)	2–4 (a.e.t.)	Dinamo Batumi (1)
26 September 2026
Samtredia (2)	1–2	Rustavi (1)

== Semifinals ==
Team 1	Score	Team 2
27 October 2026
Gagra (1)	2–1	Rustavi (1)
28 October 2026
Dinamo Batumi (1)	3–1	Dila (1)

== Final ==
12 December 2026
16:00 GET

Gagra	v	Dinamo Batumi

Mikheil Meskhi Stadium, Tbilisi
