= List of football clubs in Georgia (country) =

Dynamic list of football clubs in Georgia

This is a list of football clubs located in Georgia in the 2025 season as far down as Level 5.

== Alphabetical list of clubs ==
The divisions are correct for the 2025 season.

Key to divisional changes
New club
Club was promoted to a higher level.
Club was relegated to a lower level.

=== A ===
| Club | League | Lvl | Change from 2024 |
|---|---|---|---|
| Abuli | Regionuli Liga B | 5 | |
| Algeti | Liga 4 | 4 | |
| Algeti-2 | Regionuli Liga A | 5 | Joined the League |
| Aragvelebi | Liga 4 | 4 | From Regionuli Liga |
| Aragvi | Liga 3 | 3 | From Erovnuli Liga 2 |
| Aragvi-2 | Regionuli Liga A | 5 | |

=== B ===
| Club | League | Lvl | Change from 2024 |
|---|---|---|---|
| Bakhmaro | Liga 4 | 4 | |
| Betlemi | Liga 3 | 3 | |
| Borjomi | Liga 3 | 3 | |
| Borjomi-2 | Regionuli Liga B | 5 | Joined the League |
| BSU | Regionuli Liga C | 5 | |

=== C ===
| Club | League | Lvl | Change from 2024 |
|---|---|---|---|
| Chibati | Regionuli Liga C | 5 | |
| Chikhura | Regionuli Liga C | 5 | From Liga 4 |
| Chilovani | Regionuli Liga A | 5 | Joined the League |

=== D ===
| Club | League | Lvl | Change from 2024 |
|---|---|---|---|
| Didube | Liga 3 | 3 | From Liga 4 |
| Dila | Erovnuli Liga | 1 | |
| Dinamo Batumi | Erovnuli Liga | 1 | |
| Dinamo Batumi-2 | Regionuli Liga C | 5 | Joined the League |
| Dinamo Gagra | Regionuli Liga A | 5 | |
| Dinamo Sokhumi | Regionuli Liga B | 5 | |
| Dinamo Tbilisi | Erovnuli Liga | 1 | |
| Dinamo Tbilisi-2 | Erovnuli Liga 2 | 2 | |
| Dmanisi | Regionuli Liga A | 5 | |

=== E ===
| Club | League | Lvl | Change from 2024 |
|---|---|---|---|
| Egrisi | Regionuli Liga C | 5 | |

=== G ===
| Club | League | Lvl | Change from 2024 |
|---|---|---|---|
| Gagra | Erovnuli Liga | 1 | |
| Gagra-2 | Liga 4 | 4 | |
| Gardabani | Liga 3 | 3 | |
| Gardabani-2 | Regionuli Liga A | 5 | Joined the League |
| Gareji | Erovnuli Liga | 1 | From Erovnuli Liga 2 |
| Gareji-2 | Regionuli Liga A | 5 | |
| Gonio | Erovnuli Liga 2 | 2 | From Liga 3 |
| Gori | Liga 3 | 3 | |
| Gori-2 | Regionuli Liga B | 5 | Joined the League |
| Guria | Liga 3 | 4 | From Liga 3 |

=== I ===
| Club | League | Lvl | Change from 2024 |
|---|---|---|---|
| Iberia 1999 | Erovnuli Liga | 1 | |
| Iberia 1999 B | Erovnuli Liga 2 | 2 | From Liga 3 |
| Iberia 2010 | Liga 4 | 4 | From Regionuli Liga |
| Imereti | Regionuli Liga C | 5 | |
| Iveria | Liga 4 | 4 | From Regionuli Liga |

=== J ===
| Club | League | Lvl | Change from 2024 |
|---|---|---|---|
| Jvari | Regionuli Liga C | 5 | |
| Junkeri | Regionuli Liga B | 5 | Joined the League |

=== K ===
| Club | League | Lvl | Change from 2024 |
|---|---|---|---|
| Kareli | Regionuli Liga B | 5 | |
| Kaspi 1936 | Regionuli Liga B | 5 | |
| Khoni 2024 | Regionuli Liga C | 5 | Joined the League |
| Kolkheti 1913 | Erovnuli Liga | 1 | |
| Kolkheti-2 1913 | Liga 4 | 4 | From Regionuli Liga |
| Kolkheti Khobi | Liga 3 | 3 | From Erovnuli Liga 2 |

=== L ===
| Club | League | Lvl | Change from 2024 |
|---|---|---|---|
| Liakhvi Achabeti | Regionuli Liga B | 5 | |
| Locomotive | Erovnuli Liga 2 | 2 | |
| Locomotive-2 | Liga 3 | 3 | |

=== M ===
| Club | League | Lvl | Change from 2024 |
|---|---|---|---|
| Magaroeli | Regionuli Liga C | 5 | |
| Margveti 2006 | Liga 3 | 3 | From Liga 4 |
| Matchakhela | Liga 4 | 4 | From Liga 3 |
| Merani Martvili | Erovnuli Liga 2 | 2 | From Liga 3 |
| Merani Martvili-2 | Liga 4 | 4 | |
| Merani Tbilisi | Liga 3 | 3 | |
| Merani Tbilisi-2 | Regionuli Liga B | 5 | From Liga 4 |
| Mertskhali | Liga 4 | 4 | |
| Meshakhte | Erovnuli Liga 2 | 2 | From Liga 3 |
| Meshakhte-2 | Regionuli Liga C | 5 | |

=== N ===
| Club | League | Lvl | Change from 2024 |
|---|---|---|---|
| Norchi Dinamo 2016 | Regionuli Liga A | 5 | |

=== O ===
| Club | League | Lvl | Change from 2024 |
|---|---|---|---|
| Odishi 1919 | Liga 3 | 3 | From Liga 4 |
| Odishi-2 | Regionuli Liga C | 5 | Joined the League |
| Orbi | Liga 3 | 3 | |
| Orbi-2 | Regionuli Liga B | 5 | |

=== R ===
| Club | League | Lvl | Change from 2024 |
|---|---|---|---|
| Rustavi | Erovnuli Liga 2 | 2 | |
| Rustavi-2 | Regionuli Liga A | 5 | |

=== S ===
| Club | League | Lvl | Change from 2024 |
|---|---|---|---|
| Sairme | Regionuli Liga C | 5 | |
| Samegrelo | Regionuli Liga C | 5 | Joined the League |
| Samgurali | Erovnuli Liga | 1 | |
| Samgurali-2 | Liga 4 | 4 | |
| Samtredia | Erovnuli Liga 2 | 2 | From Erovnuli Liga |
| Samtskhe | Regionuli Liga B | 5 | |
| Sapovnela | Regionuli Liga C | 5 | |
| Shturmi | Liga 3 | 3 | From Erovnuli Liga 2 |
| Shturmi-2 | Regionuli Liga A | 5 | Joined the League |
| Sioni | Erovnuli Liga 2 | 2 | |
| Skuri | Liga 4 | 4 | |
| Spaeri | Erovnuli Liga 2 | 2 | |
| Spaeri-2 | Regionuli Liga B | 5 | |
| Sulori | Liga 4 | 4 | |

=== T ===
| Club | League | Lvl | Change from 2024 |
|---|---|---|---|
| Telavi | Erovnuli Liga | 1 | |
| Torpedo | Erovnuli Liga | 1 | |
| Torpedo-2 | Regionuli Liga C | 5 | |
| Tskhumi | Regionuli Liga A | 5 | |

=== U ===
| Club | League | Lvl | Change from 2024 |
|---|---|---|---|
| UG 35 | Regionuli Liga A | 5 | |
| Ukimerioni | Regionuli Liga B | 5 | Joined the League |

=== V ===
| Club | League | Lvl | Change from 2024 |
|---|---|---|---|
| Varketili | Liga 3 | 3 | |
| Varketili-2 | Regionuli Liga A | 5 | From Liga 4 |
| Vazisubani | Regionuli Liga B | 5 | |

=== W ===
| Club | League | Lvl | Change from 2024 |
|---|---|---|---|
| West Georgia | Regionuli Liga C | 5 | Joined the League |
| WIT Georgia | Liga 3 | 3 | From Erovnuli Liga 2 |
| WIT Georgia-2 | Liga 4 | 4 | |

=== Z ===
| Club | League | Lvl | Change from 2024 |
|---|---|---|---|
| Zana | Liga 4 | 4 | |
| Zestaponi | Liga 4 | 4 | From Liga 3 |
| Zooveti | Regionuli Liga A | 5 | Joined the League |

== Other clubs ==
Below is the combined list of football schools, defunct Georgian teams and active Abkhazian clubs.

- Abazg Sukhum
- Afon Novy Afon
- Amirani
- Arsenali
- Celero Football Academy
- Dinamo Kutaisi
- Ertsakhu Ochamchira
- FC Aeti Sokhumi
- FC Alazani
- FC Bzana Kutol
- FC Chkherimela Kharagauli
- FC Duruji Kvareli
- FC Fazisi Racha
- FC Gorda Rustavi
- FC IBSU Tbilisi
- FC Iberia Tbilisi
- FC Khikhani Khulo
- FC Kolkhi Gulriphshi
- FC Legioni Gori
- FC Leon Ochamchira
- FC Lesichine
- Liakhvi Tskhinvali
- FC Meshakre Agara
- FC Mtskheta Kojaeli
- FC Mtskheta Urioni
- FC Olimpiki Tbilisi
- FC Porvadi Tbilisi
- FC Psyrtsha Afon
- FC Samtredia 2
- FC Sasco Tbilisi
- FC Shevardeni 1906
- FC Shevardeni 1906 2
- FC Shukura Kobuleti
- FC Spartaki Tbilisi
- FC STU Tbilisi
- FC Tbilisi
- FC Tbilisi City
- FC Telavi 2
- FC Tori Borjomi
- FC Tskhinvali
- FC UC Best Tiflis
- FC Voyage Tbilisi
- Georgian Football Federation Academy
- Hereti Lagodekhi
- Interi Kutaisi
- Juventus Academy Georgia
- Kakheti Telavi
- Kiaraz Pitsunda
- Meta Batumi
- Milani Tsnori
- Mziuri Gali
- Nart Sokhumi
- Prema Tbilisi
- Ritsa Gudauta
- Salkhino Martvili
- Samurzakan Gal
- SKA-Dinamo Sukhum FC
- TSU Tbilisi
- TTU Tbilisi
- Trialeti Tsalka
- Yertsakhu Ochamchira

== See also ==
- List of football clubs in Abkhazia
