= 2025 Georgian Cup =

Davit Kipiani Cup

Tournament details
- Country: Georgia
- Dates: 4 May – 10 December

Final positions
- Champions: Dila
- Runners-up: Iberia 1999

Tournament statistics
- Matches played: 65
- Goals scored: 243 (3.74 per match)
- All statistics correct as of `10 December 2025.

The 2025 Georgian Cup, also called the Davit Kipiani Cup, is a single knock-out football tournament, organized by the Georgian Football Federation. The winner of this year's Cup will earn the right to take part in the 2026–27 UEFA Conference League qualifying round and the 2026 Georgian Super Cup.

2nd division club Spaeri are the most recent title holders, having beaten Dinamo Tbilisi in the 2024 Cup final on penalties.

== Calendar ==
Round	Date(s)	Fixtures	Clubs	Leagues / Teams entering
Preliminary round	4-18 May 2025	16	32 → 16	Liga 4, Regionuli Liga, Amateur League
First round	12 June 2025	16	32 → 16	Liga 3
Second round	20 June 2025	8	16 → 8	
Third Round	19-22 July 2025	12	24 → 12	Erovnuli liga 2, Erovnuli Liga
Round of 16	26 July-20 August 2025	8	16 → 8	Teams, participating in 2025–26 UEFA European campaign
Quarterfinals	23 September 2025	4	8 → 4	
Semifinals	30-31 October 2025	2	4 → 2	
Final	TBA	1	2 → 1	

== Preliminary round ==
Sixteen matches of this round were played between 4 and 18 May 2025. Apart from 15 representatives of Regionuli Liga and all 16 clubs of Liga 4, one slot was allocated for the 2024 Amateur League (AL) winner.

Team 1	Score	Team 2
4 May 2025
Liakhvi Achabeti (5)	0–0 (a.e.t.) (3–4 p)	Zestaponi (4)
8 May 2025
Ianeti Samtredia (AL)	7–2	Chikhura (5)
9 May 2025
UG 35 (5)	3–1	Spaeri-2 (5)
Shturmi-2 (5)	5–0	Merani Tbilisi-2 (5)
Samtskhe (5)	3–1	Aragvi-2 (5)
10 May 2025
Rustavi-2 (5)	1–1 (a.e.t.) (4–2 p)	Kolkheti-2 (4)
Egrisi (5)	0–3	Skuri (4)
BSU (5)	0–4	Samgurali-2 (4)
11 May 2025
Zana (4)	2–1	Iberia 2010 (4)
Gagra-2 (4)	2–2 (a.e.t.) (6–5 p)	Guria (4)
Mertskhali (4)	2–1	Machakhela (4)
15 May 2025
Enguri Jvari (5)	1–3	Torpedo-2 (5)
17 May 2025
Tbilisi 2025-2 (5)	0–5	WIT Georgia-2 (4)
Gardabani-2 (5)	1–4	Algeti (4)
Aragvelebi (4)	2–0	Merani Martvili-2 (4)
18 May 2025
Iveria (4)	3–5 (a.e.t.)	Sulori (4)

== First round ==
The draw for the next two rounds took place on 28 May 2025. At this stage all 16 clubs from the 3rd division entered the competition.

Team 1	Score	Team 2
12 June 2025
UG 35 (5)	6–1	Merani Tbilisi (3)
Aragvelebi (4)	2–3	Margveti 2006 (3)
Shturmi-2 (5)	1–3 (a.e.t.)	Orbi (3)
Samgurali-2 (4)	0–1	Didube (3)
Rustavi-2 (5)	1–0	Sulori (4)
Mertskhali (4)	1–3	Odishi 1919 (3)
Borjomi (3)	2–4	Betlemi (3)
Samtskhe (5)	2–0	Gori (3)
Zestaponi (4)	0–3	Gagra-2 (4)
Bakhmaro (3)	2–1	Kolkheti Khobi (3)
Skuri (4)	3–1	Gardabani (3)
Aragvi (3)	0–3	WIT Georgia (3)
Zana (4)	1–2	Tbilisi 2025 (3)
Torpedo-2 (5)	1–1 (a.e.t.) (5–6 p)	Shturmi (3)
Ianeti (AL)	2–4 (a.e.t.)	WIT Georgia-2 (4)
Algeti (4)	7–4	Locomotive-2 (3)

== Second round ==
Team 1	Score	Team 2
20 June 2025
Gagra-2 (4)	2–0	WIT Georgia-2 (4)
Bakhmaro (3)	0–4	Shturmi (3)
Margveti 2006 (3)	0–3	Tbilisi 2025 (3)
Rustavi-2 (5)	0–1	Odishi 1919 (3)
UG 35 (5)	3–1	Skuri (4)
Didube (3)	2–3 (a.e.t.)	WIT Georgia (3)
Algeti (4)	3–0	Orbi (3)
Samtskhe (5)	2–1	Betlemi (3)

== Third round ==
A total of sixteen teams from the Erovnuli Liga 2 and Erovnuli Liga join the competition in this round. Fifth tier sides UG 35 and Samtskhe were the lowest-ranked teams in the draw, which was made on 24 June 2025.

Team 1	Score	Team 2
19 July 2025
Samtredia (2)	1–0	Dinamo Tbilisi (1)
UG 35 (5)	2–8	Merani Martvili (2)
Samtskhe (5)	0–1	Odishi 1919 (3)
Algeti (4)	0–8	Shturmi (3)
20 July 2025
Meshakhte (2)	2–1 (a.e.t.)	Gagra (1)
Locomotive (2)	3–0	Dinamo Tbilisi-2 (2)
Gagra-2 (4)	0–5	Dinamo Batumi (1)
Gareji (1)	1–1 (a.e.t.) (2–4 p)	Kolkheti 1913 (1)
Gonio (2)	0–1	Samgurali (1)
Rustavi (2)	1–0	Telavi (1)
21 July 2025
WIT Georgia (3)	1–2	Iberia 1999 B (2)
22 July 2025
Tbilisi 2025 (3)	2–3 (a.e.t.)	Sioni (2)

== Round of 16 ==
Last four teams from tier 1 and tier 2 participating in 2025–26 UEFA European campaign entered the contest in this round. The draw took place on 24 July.

Team 1	Score	Team 2
26 July 2025
Odishi 1919 (3)	0–3	Samtredia (2)
Meshakhte (2)	3–1	Merani Martvili (2)
Shturmi (3)	1–2	Locomotive (2)
27 July 2025
Iberia 1999 B (2)	2–2 (a.e.t.) (3–4 p)	Rustavi (2)
Samgurali (1)	0–0 (a.e.t.) (4–5 p)	Dila (1)
Sioni (2)	2–2 (a.e.t.) (1–4 p)	Dinamo Batumi (1)
13 August 2025 (Note: Postponed)
Iberia 1999 (1)	2–1	Torpedo Kutaisi (1)
20 August 2025
Spaeri (2)	4–2 (a.e.t.)	Kolkheti 1913 (1)

== Quarter-finals ==
The draw took place on 7 August.

Team 1	Score	Team 2
23 September 2025
Meshakhte (2)	0–3	Iberia 1999 (1)
Rustavi (2)	1–2	Samtredia (2)
Locomotive (2)	0–3	Dinamo Batumi (1)
Spaeri (2)	1–2	Dila (1)

== Semi-finals ==
The draw took place on 7 August.

Team 1	Score	Team 2
30 October 2025
Samtredia (2)	0–2 (a.e.t.)	Dila (1)
31 October 2025
Iberia 1999(1)	5–1	Dinamo Batumi (1)

== Final ==
10 December 2025
19:00 GET

Iberia 1999	1–3	Dila
Agyakwa 71'		Ouattara 2'; Agyakwa 49' (o.g.); Konté 90'

David Petriashvili Stadium, Tbilisi
Referee: Irakli Shengelia
