= 2022 Georgian Cup =

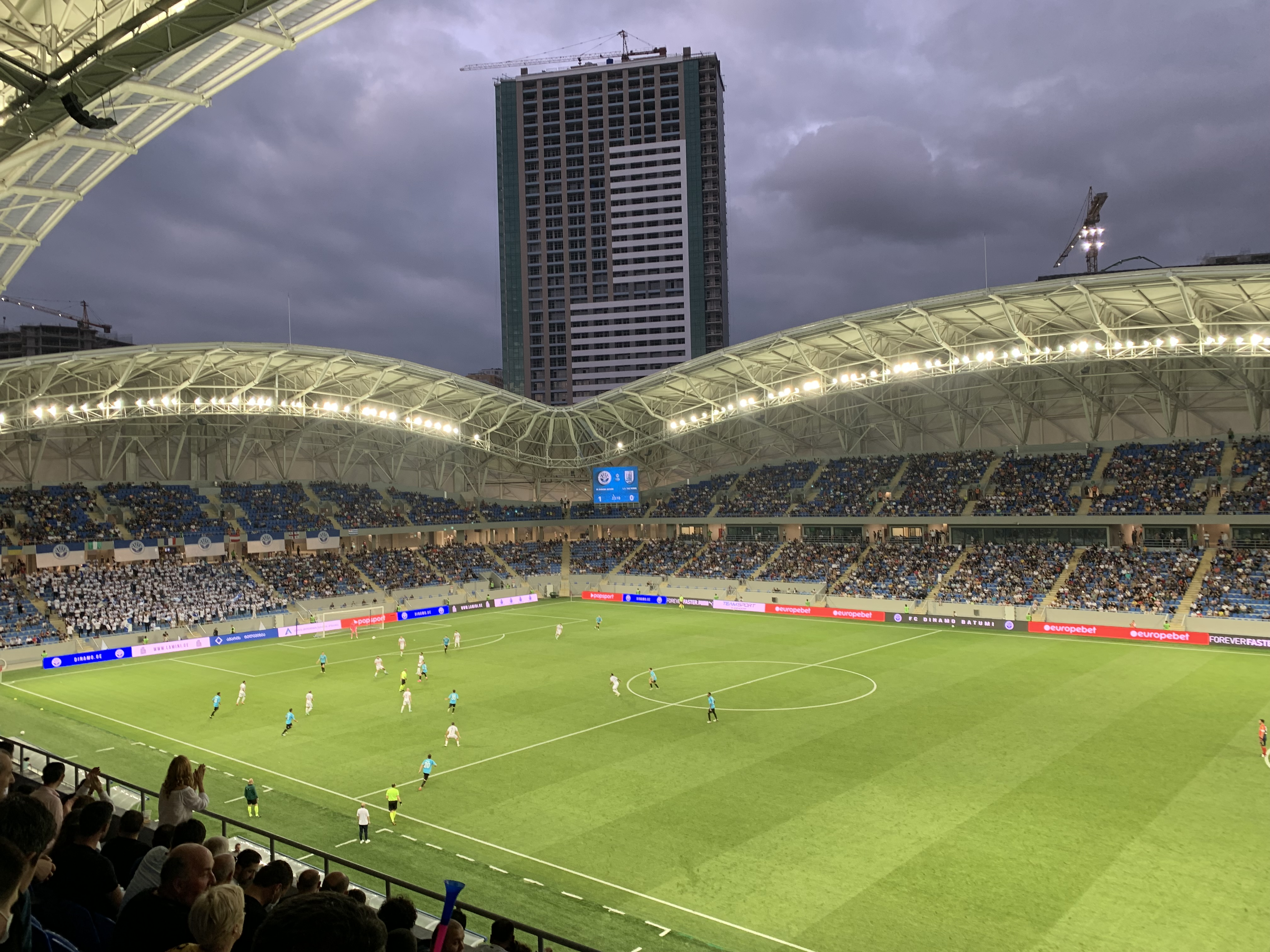
- Adjarabet Arena hosted the final on 7 December

Tournament details
- Country: Georgia
- Dates: 8 May – 7 December
- Teams: 78

Final positions
- Champions: Torpedo Kutaisi (5th title)
- Runners-up: Locomotive II

Tournament statistics
- Matches played: 77
- Goals scored: 284 (3.69 per match)
- Top goal scorer(s): Pedro Monteiro (3 goals)
- All statistics correct as of 7 December 2022.

The 2022 Georgian Cup was a single knock-out football tournament, organized by Georgian Football Federation. The winner qualified for the first round of the 2023–24 UEFA Europa Conference League season.

Saburtalo Tbilisi were the holders, having beaten Samgurali in the 2021 Cup final. They were eliminated by Lokomotive Tbilisi II in the semifinals.

Torpedo Kutaisi beat Lokomotive's reserve team in the final to win the fifth Georgian Cup final and first since 2018.

== Calendar ==
Round	Date(s)	Number of fixtures	Clubs	New entries this round	Goals
Preliminary round	8 & 9 Маy	13	26 → 13	34	62
First round	26 & 27 May	23	46 → 23	None	87
Second round	6 & 7 July	12	24 → 12	16	49
Third round	6, 7 & 8 August	14	28 → 14	2	45
Round of 16	13 & 14 September	8	16 → 8	none	25
Quarter-finals	12 October	4	8 → 4	none	12
Semi-finals	2 November	2	4 → 2	none	2
Final	7 December	1	2 → 1	none	2

== Preliminary round ==
The draw for the initial two rounds was held on 18 April. It granted a bye for the third round to the winner of Egrisi – Tskhumi tie.

The twenty six matches were played on 8–9 May. This round saw Basiani, the winner of the 2021 Amateur League season, joined by 26 teams from tier 5.

Team 1	Score	Team 2
Telavi II	6–0	Martve Kutaisi
Merani Tbilisi III	2–2 (a.e.t.) (8–7 p)	35-e Skola
Liakhvi Achabeti	0–1	Shukura II
Gorda Rustavi	11–0	Chibati
Gardabani	5–1	Gldani Tbilisi
Kolkhi	3–2	Mertskhali
BSU Batumi	3–0	Iberia 2010
Sportuni Tbilisi	2–5	Zana
Basiani Tbilisi	2–3 (a.e.t.)	Varketili Tbilisi II
Gonio	4–0	Iveria
Egrisi	0–2	Tskhumi
Legioni Gori	3–1	Kaspi 1936
Gareji II	4–0	Norchi Dinamo 2016

== First round ==
This round featured two more teams of tier 5 and all 32 teams of Liga 3 and Liga 4 along with the winners of the previous round. It was skipped by Tskhumi.

The matches were played on 26 and 27 May.

Team 1	Score	Team 2
Aragvi (3)	1–2	Dinamo Tbilisi II (3)
BSU Batumi (5)	4–1	Gorda Rustavi (5)
Locomotive II (4)	3–1 (a.e.t.)	Irao Tbilisi (3)
Shukura II (5)	3–1	Merani Tbilisi II (3)
Imereti (5)	0–1	Guria (3)
Telavi II (5)	0–4	Chikhura (3)
Samgurali II (4)	2–3	Zestaponi (3)
Merani III (5)	0–7	Saburtalo II (3)
Tbilisi City (3)	1–2	Gori (3)
Meshakhte (3)	2–1	Borjomi (3)
Betlemi (4)	0–2	Kolkheti-1913 (3)
Merani Martvili II (4)	1–3	Varketili Tbilisi (3)
Matchakhela (4)	3–2	Shturmi (4)
Gonio (5)	3–1	Kolkheti Khobi (3)
Gardabani (5)	4–1	Bakhmaro (3)
Tbilisi (5)	1–2	Didube Tbilisi (4)
Iberia Tbilisi (4)	4–1	Skuri (4)
Sulori (4)	1–1 (a.e.t.) (3–0 p)	Magaroeli (4)
Legioni Gori (5)	1–2	Varketili Tbilisi II (5)
WIT Georgia II (4)	3–0	Odishi 1919 (4)
Gareji II (5)	0–1	Zana (5)
Kolkhi (5)	2–6	Samegrelo (4)
Margveti 2006 (4)	2–1	Algeti (4)

== Second round ==
The draw for the next two rounds held on 14 June determined the twelve ties. They were played on 6 and 7 July with the winners due to take on the clubs represented in top two divisions in early August.

Team 1	Score	Team 2
Sulori (4)	2–2 (a.e.t.) (4–5 p)	Dinamo Tbilisi II (3)
BSU Batumi (5)	1–5	Kolkheti-1913 (3)
Varketili Tbilisi II (5)	1–3	Locomotive II (4)
Shukura II (5)	2–6 (a.e.t.)	Varketili Tbilisi (3)
Tskhumi (5)	1–0	Meshakhte (3)
Matchakhela (4)	4–0	Zestaponi (3)
Gonio (5)	1–2	Guria (3)
Gardabani (5)	2–0	Gori (3)
Samegrelo (4)	4–3	Didube Tbilisi (4)
Iberia Tbilisi (4)	0–3 (awd.)	Saburtalo II (3)
WIT Georgia II (4)	4–1	Chikhura (3)
Zana (5)	2–0	Margveti 2006 (4)

== Third Round ==
Eight teams from Liga 2 and eight teams from Erovnuli Liga joined the competition at this stage with the matches played on 6–8 August.

Team 1	Score	Team 2
Dinamo Tbilisi II (3)	3–2	Sioni (1)
Locomotive II (4)	1–0	Samgurali (1)
Shukura (2)	2–0	Gagra (1)
Varketili Tbilisi (3)	2–0	Saburtalo II (3)
Samtredia (2)	1–2	Dinamo Tbilisi (1)
Matchakhela (4)	1–6	Dila (1)
Guria (3)	1–0	Kolkheti-1913 (3)
Gardabani (5)	1–8	Rustavi (2)
Gareji (2)	0–1	Telavi (1)
Merani Tbilisi (2)	2–2 (a.e.t.) (3–4 p)	Spaeri (2)
Samegrelo (4)	0–3	Merani Martvili (2)
WIT Georgia II (4)	1–2	Torpedo Kutaisi (1)
Zana (5)	1–0	Tskhumi (5)
WIT Georgia (2)	2–2 (a.e.t.) (2–4 p)	Loc omotive (1)

== Round of 16 ==
Based on the draw held on 5 August, these ties were played on 13 and 14 September. Dinamo Batumi and Saburtalo Tbilisi, respectively the champions and Cup holders of the previous season, entered the contest in this round.

Team 1	Score	Team 2
Dinamo Tbilisi II (3)	1–4	Dila (1)
Dinamo Batumi (1)	0–0 (a.e.t.) (0–3 p)	Dinamo Tbilisi (1)
Locomotive II (4)	1–1 (a.e.t.) (4–2 p)	Telavi (1)
Spaeri (2)	0–1	Torpedo Kutaisi (1)
Shukura (2)	2–0	Lokomotive (1)
Zana (5)	1–4	Guria (3)
Merani Martvili (2)	2–3 (a.e.t.)	Saburtalo (1)
Varketili Tbilisi (3)	2–3	Rustavi (2)

== Quarterfinals ==
These matches were played on 12 October.

Team 1	Score	Team 2
Lokomotive II (4)	1–0	Guria (3)
Rustavi (2)	2–4	Torpedo Kutaisi (1)
Shukura (2)	0–2	Saburtalo (1)
Dinamo Tbilisi (1)	2–1	Dila (1)

== Semifinals ==
For the first time after 2019 a fourth-tier team reached the semifinals. The games were held on 2 November.

Team 1	Score	Team 2
Torpedo Kutaisi (1)	2–0	Dinamo Tbilisi (1)
Lokomotive II (4)	0–0 (a.e.t.) (7–6 p)	Saburtalo (1)

== Final ==
For the first time a fourth-tier team reached the final.

7 December 2022
19:00

Torpedo Kutaisi (1)	2–0	Locomotive II (4)
Caballero 53'; Kimadze 60'

Adjarabet Arena, Batumi
Referee: Aleko Aptsiauri

== See also ==
- 2022 Erovnuli Liga
- 2022 Erovnuli Liga 2
- 2022 Liga 3
- 2022 Liga 4
