= Ucha Sosiashvili =

Georgian manager (born 1989)

Ucha Sosiashvili უჩა სოსიაშვილი
Personal information
- Date of birth: 26 July 1989 (age 37)
- Place of birth: Tbilisi, Georgia

Managerial career
- Years: Team
- 2013: Samtredia
- 2013–2014: Dinamo Tbilisi-2
- 2014–2017: Dila
- 2017: Margveti 2006
- 2017–2018: Samtredia
- 2018: Rustavi
- 2019–2021: Samgurali
- 2022: Sioni
- 2023: Shukura
- 2023: Saburtalo-2
- 2023: Saburtalo (caretaker)
- 2024–2025: Samtskhe
- 2026: Sioni

Ucha Sosiashvili (Georgian: უჩა სოსიაშვილი; born 26 July 1989) is a Georgian football manager, who most recently was in charge of Erovnuli Liga 2 club Sioni.

Sosiashvili is the youngest Georgian coach to have won the national league. He has guided Dila to their only champion's title in history and achieved back-to-back promotions with Samgurali.

== Career ==
=== Early steps ===
Sosiashvili started his managerial career at 35th football school before being appointed as an assistant coach at the national women's team for two years. In early 2012, he took charge of the Avaza youth team. Pirveli Liga side Samtredia became the first professional men's team which signed a contract with Sosiashvili in the summer of 2013. With his team topping the standings by half-season, Sosiashvili drew interest from Dinamo Tbilisi who appointed him as the manager of their reserve team in the 2nd division.

=== Youngest champion coach ===
On 18 June 2014, 24-year-old Sosiashvili became the youngest top-flight coach in Georgia. As he later revealed in an interview, while he was being introduced as head coach of Dila at the press office, some individuals laughed in a humiliating manner. Yet, Sosiashvili pledged to build a strong team, ready to compete for top trophies in the future. Dila surged forward to emerge among title challengers from the very beginning of the 2014-15 season and claimed the league title on 13 May 2015 after a narrow win over Samtredia with two games still in hand.

As the youngest coach who had ever won the Georgian league, Ucha Sosiashvili described it as the most pleasant moment of his life, admitting that he could not expect such achievement at the start of this season. He also pointed out that his example contradicted with the stereotype, which considers experience as a key to this level of success.

Sosiashvili left Dila in January 2017, following major changes that saw his entire squad gone and new owners at the helm.

=== Samgurali period ===
After brief stints at Margveti 2006, Samtredia and Rustavi, Sosiashvili embarked on a new project with Samgurali on 19 September 2019. With the team languishing in Liga 3, promotion to the 2nd tier was set as their immediate goal. Samgurali finished as runners-up of the season, qualified for playoffs and after a 9–0 aggregate thrashing of Kolkheti 1913 returned to the Erovnuli Liga 2. A year later, Sosiashvili led Samgurali to their first promotion to the top tier after an 18 year-long absence.

With Samgurali sitting 7th after eight rounds, Sosiashvili was fired in mid-April 2021. He had secured two promotions within the two years.

=== Recent years ===
Sosiashvili spent most of the 2022 season at Sioni. As the team was trying to climb out of the relegation zone, he left the club in November, with three games of the regular season still to play.

The next year, he briefly moved to Shukura who endured a turbulent and dismal season under four different managers before being demoted and dissolved. Since 2023, Sosiashvili has been working in lower leagues, dismissing the opinion that a top-flight winning coach should not train small clubs.

In 2024, Sosiashvili took over the municipal Regionuli Liga club Samtskhe. His team finished on equal points for a play-off spot but failed to complete its first promotion push due to league tie-breaker rules. A year later, Samtskhe were the only team across five divisions with a perfect form, at the same time knocking out three cup opponents, including two Liga 3 sides. Following this season, they achieved their first ever promotion to a higher league.

On 15 January 2026, Liga 2 side Sioni announced the return of Sosiashvili to the club after a three-year pause.

== Honours ==
Umaglesi Liga (level 1) winner:

- 2014–15

Erovnuli Liga 2 (level 2) runner-up:

- 2020

Liga 3 (level 3) runner-up:

- 2019

Regionuli Liga (level 5) winner:

- 2025 (Group B)
