= Gurian derby =

- Location: Guria, Georgia
- Teams: Guria; Mertskhali
- Latest meeting: Guria 3–0 Mertskhali (Liga 4, 12 November 2025)
- Stadiums: Evgrapi Shevardnadze Stadium (Guria); Megobroba Stadium (Mertskhali)

Statistics
- Total meetings: 36
- Most wins: Guria (17)
- Largest victory: Guria 8–2 Mertskhali (Umaglesi Liga, 30 October 1991)

The Gurian derby (Georgian: გურული დერბი) is the name given to a football derby contested by Georgian football clubs Mertskhali and Guria, dating back to the 1930s. Fueled by geographic proximity (33 km), the fixture is regarded as a tense encounter rarely seen anywhere in the country even though these teams are experiencing a challenging period.

Guria hold a better record against their rivals.

== Background ==
The Ozurgeti and Lanchkhuti districts represent two of the three administrative areas in western Georgian region of Guria. Being a provincial capital, Ozurgeti was named as Makharadze in 1934 in memory of Filipp Makharadze, a local-born Bolshevik leader and prominent Soviet high-ranking official.

Two football clubs from these cities participated in a four-team regional tournament in 1937 with the team from Lanchkhuti advancing to next round. This success gave the latter a major boost in their bid to become the best team in Guria, but World War II halted any sport activities until their revival in the early 1950s.

As members of the Kolmeurne society, both football teams for several years bore the name "Kolmeurne", which literally means a collective farm worker. In 1959, they were allowed to change names, but a feud ignited as to which one would be entitled to adopt Guria. Though Lanchkhuti was nearly twice smaller in size, it still managed to obtain this privilege. According to one version, it resulted from a better league position that they reached in domestic championship a year earlier. Rumours also had it that they were quicker with submitting necessary documents for registration. At any rate, their relationship became tense.

== History ==
=== Soviet-time competitions (1950s–1970s) ===

Although the neighbouring teams played many matches before, they faced each other in 1954 to determine the winner of the Kolmeurne Cup held in Lanchkhuti. The Makharadze team beat the rivals 2–0. Renamed as Sikharuli, they went on to thrash Guria 4–0 in a Georgian Cup final on 5 September 1960 to clinch the cup for the second time in a row. A year later, they adopted a new name, Mertskhali. Shalva Kakabadze, whose tenure as Guria's manager lasted 25 years, set a task to his team to ensure they stay above their opponents. "Not a big deal if we finish in 15th place provided that they come 16th", - the coach was said to quip in front of his players.

In 1966, Guria won the republican tournament, tier 4 of Soviet football, to progress to the Soviet Class B. Mertskhali followed suit the next season, resuming their competition from 1968 in the Soviet third division now. With the exception of the 1971 season, which saw Guria demoted back to the republican level, the teams played 14 times against each other. With Mertskhali dropped out of the Soviet league in 1975 and Guria, vice versa, promoted to the Soviet First League in 1979, the sides did not meet until 1990. During this period Mertskhali secured a slight head-to-head advantage (5W 3L).

=== Georgian competitions (1990–) ===
Based on their performances in 1989, these clubs were supposed to be two divisions apart next year, but since Georgia switched to the national league, they both found themselves in an inaugurating season of the Umaglesi Liga. Meanwhile, as the communist system started to crumble, the provincial centre returned its original name. Guria, experiencing a golden period in history, achieved an overall dominance in their five encounters, although a 5–2 loss at a time they were chasing Dinamo Tbilisi for the league title, left a bitter taste again.

Two years later, it was Guria's turn to run riot against their opponents with a 10–2 aggregate goal difference. As Mertskhali were relegated after this season, it turned out to be their last league encounter not only in the XX century but also in the top tier. In the cup competition, though, Guria won on away goals in 1997.

Guria picked up a single point in next two games held in 2002–03 when the sides resumed their contest in the 2nd division now. Their paths were also crossed in 2012 when the teams competed for promotion in an additional tournament involving eight teams. Although Guria won 6–0 on aggregate, they both finished below the promotion zone.

Guria advanced to the Umaglesi Liga in 2013 for four seasons while Mertskhali fell to the lowest division soon. Therefore, the media was excited to announce in June 2025 that the derby was due to take place again after a twelve-year pause in tier 4. Six points taken against Mertskhali helped Guria secure an immediate return to Liga 3.

The sides have met in all four national divisions as well as in the cup since 1990. Guria are dominant (14W 2L), being unbeaten in 13 consecutive matches.

== Summary ==
Throughout this contest, Mertskhali played two seasons in a higher league than Guria. Five more times they finished higher in the same division against eleven. Giga Kverenchkhiladze is the only player who has scored for both teams in the derby.

As of 21 December 2025

| Competition | Matches | Guria wins | Draws | Mertskhali wins |
|---|---|---|---|---|
| Soviet Leagues (defunct) | 14 | 3 | 6 | 5 |
| Soviet Cup (defunct) | 1 | 0 | 0 | 1 |
| Div.1 | 5 | 4 | 0 | 1 |
| Div.2 | 10 | 7 | 2 | 1 |
| Div.3 | 2 | 1 | 1 | 0 |
| Div.4 | 2 | 2 | 0 | 0 |
| National Cup | 2 | 0 | 2 | 0 |
| Total | 36 | 17 | 11 | 8 |

== Honours ==
As of 21 December 2025

| Competition | Guria | Mertskhali |
|---|---|---|
| Georgian Cup | 1 | 0 |
| Georgian Soviet Championship | 3 | 3 |
| Pirveli Liga | 2 | 0 |
| Total | 6 | 3 |
