= 2025 Liga 4 (Georgia) =

Football season in Georgia

Liga 4
- Season: 2025
- Dates: 2 April – 26 November
- Champions: Iberia 2010
- Promoted: Iberia 2010; Iveria; Guria
- Relegated: Zestaponi; Sulori; Zana; Matchakhela
- Matches: 240
- Goals: 878 (3.66 per match)
- Biggest home win: Zana 11–0 Matchakhela (8 October)
- Biggest away win: Matchakhela 0–11 Samgurali-2 (17 September)
- Highest scoring: WIT Georgia-2 12–2 Matchakhela (25 June)
- Longest winning run: Guria; Iveria (6 matches each)
- Longest unbeaten run: Guria (14)
- Longest winless run: Matchakhela (30)
- Longest losing run: Matchakhela (22)
- All statistics correct as of complete.

The 2025 Liga 4 season was the 7th edition of fourth-tier football in Georgia under its current title. It began on 2 April and ended on 26 November.

The season consisted of 30 rounds with each team playing 28 matches. In mid-November, after the 27th round Iveria secured promotion to Liga 3 along with Iberia 2010. Prior to the last matchday, all four lowest-finishing teams bound for relegation to Regionuli Liga were determined whilst the third promotion spot remained up for grabs on the final day. In a most dramatic fashion, Guria scored twice in injury time against their rivals Aragvelebi to snatch a draw and gain promotion back to Liga 3.

It was the only league across five national divisions where no after-season play-offs were held.

== Team changes ==
The following teams changed division after the previous season:

=== To Liga 4 ===
Relegated from Liga 3

Zestaponi • Machakhela • Guria

Promoted from Regionuli Liga

Aragvelebi • Iberia 2010 • Iveria • Kolkheti-2

=== From Liga 4 ===
Promoted to Liga 3

Didube • Odishi 1919 • Margveti 2006

Relegated to Regionuli Liga

Varketili-2 • Merani Tbilisi-2 • Chikhura

== Teams and locations ==
Location of Liga 4 football clubs in 2025

It was the first season since 2022 with sixteen participant teams. Four of them had been members of the first tier:

- Zestaponi (2004–15)
- Sulori (1991, 1991–92)
- Mertskhali (1990–92, 2003–04)
- Iveria (1990–97)

Six more spots were occupied by reserve teams of higher league clubs.

Aragvelebi, Guria, Iberia 2010 and Iveria made their first appearances in Liga 4 this season. The clubs are listed below in alphabetical order.

Club	Position last season	Location	Region	Venue
Algeti	10th	Marneuli	Kvemo Kartli	Central stadium
Aragvelebi	1st in Regionuli Liga A	Tbilisi	Tbilisi	Central stadium, Sagarejo
Gagra-2	9th	Tbilisi	Tbilisi	Central stadium, Mukhrani
Guria	16th in Liga 3	Lanchkhuti	Guria	Evgrapi Shevardnadze Stadium
Iberia 2010	Regionuli Liga PO winner	Tbilisi	Tbilisi	Olympic stadium
Iveria	1st in Regionuli Liga B	Khashuri	Shida Kartli	Grigol Jomartidze Stadium
Kolkheti-2 1913	1st in Regionuli Liga C	Poti	Samegrelo	Fazisi Stadium
Matchakhela	15th in Liga 3	Khelvachauri	Adjara	Akhalsopeli
Merani Martvili-2	8th	Martvili	Samegrelo	Murtaz Khurtsilava stadium
Mertskhali	11th	Ozurgeti	Guria	Megobroba Stadium
Samgurali-2	4th	Tskaltubo	Imereti	26 May stadium
Skuri	6th	Tsalenjikha	Samegrelo	Sasha Kvaratskhelia stadium
Sulori	5th	Vani	Imereti	Grigol Nikoleishvili stadium
WIT Georgia-2	12th	Tbilisi	Tbilisi	Mtskheta Park, Mtskheta
Zana	7th	Abasha	Samegrelo	Mevlud Miminoshvili stadium
Zestaponi	14th in Liga 3	Zestaponi	Imereti	Ilia Kokaia Centre, Tbilisi

== League table ==
Pos	Team	Pld	W	D	L	GF	GA	GD	Pts	Promotion, qualification or relegation
1	Iberia 2010 (P)	30	20	3	7	86	45	+41	63	Promotion to Liga 3
2	Iveria (P)	30	18	7	5	55	25	+30	61	Promotion to Liga 3
3	Guria (P)	30	16	9	5	66	29	+37	57	Promotion to Liga 3
4	Aragvelebi	30	16	6	8	75	44	+31	54	
5	Skuri	30	16	5	9	56	40	+16	53	
6	Algeti	30	15	7	8	70	40	+30	52	
7	Merani Martvili-2	30	13	6	11	52	46	+6	45	
8	Kolkheti-2	30	12	8	10	72	50	+22	44	
9	WIT Georgia-2	30	12	6	12	58	47	+11	42	
10	Gagra-2	30	12	6	12	41	41	0	42	
11	Mertskhali	30	10	9	11	61	67	−6	39	
12	Samgurali-2	30	10	7	13	47	40	+7	37	
13	Zestaponi (R)	30	7	8	15	47	57	−10	29	Relegation to Regionuli Liga
14	Sulori (R)	30	7	6	17	36	63	−27	27	Relegation to Regionuli Liga
15	Zana (R)	30	5	8	17	48	76	−28	23	Relegation to Regionuli Liga
16	Matchakhela (R)	30	0	1	29	8	168	−160	1	Relegation to Regionuli Liga

Source: gff.ge
Rules for classification: 1) Points; 2) Head-to-head points; 3) Head-to-head goal difference; 4) Head-to-head goals scored; 5) Head-to-head away goals scored (only if two teams); 6) Goal difference; 7) Goals scored.
(P) Promoted; (R) Relegated

=== Results ===
Home \ Away	ALG	ARA	GAG	GUR	IBR	IVR	KOL	MAT	MRN	MER	SMG	SKR	SUL	WIT	ZAN	ZES
Algeti		5–3	6–0	0–1	2–3	2–0	2–0	5–0	0–1	5–1	2–1	1–0	3–0	4–1	7–2	0–0
Aragvelebi	2–1		1–2	2–2	4–0	3–0	1–0	7–0	1–2	1–1	3–3	1–1	3–0	1–0	5–2	3–1
Gagra-2	1–1	4–1		0–2	2–1	1–1	3–4	3–0	2–2	1–1	2–0	0–1	3–0	0–1	0–1	0–1
Guria	3–0	4–4	2–2		0–0	2–1	0–0	10–0	1–1	3–0	1–0	2–0	4–1	1–0	1–1	4–0
Iberia 2010	4–2	4–5	3–1	2–0		1–2	5–2	10–0	3–1	2–3	2–1	3–1	2–1	4–3	7–1	2–1
Iveria	1–0	1–0	1–0	1–0	0–0		3–1	10–0	1–2	1–1	2–0	2–1	3–1	3–2	2–1	0–0
Kolkheti-2	1–2	4–0	3–2	3–2	0–3	2–2		7–0	1–0	3–3	1–1	0–2	6–0	3–0	7–0	1–1
Matchakhela	0–4	0–6	0–2	0–6	2–6	0–4	0–9		0–6	0–3	0–11	0–4	0–2	0–2	1–1	1–7
Merani-2	1–1	1–2	1–2	3–4	2–4	3–2	3–1	2–0		2–1	1–0	1–2	2–4	1–1	3–2	0–2
Mertskhali	2–2	1–4	4–2	1–3	1–1	0–3	1–1	5–1	0–0		5–3	1–3	2–2	4–2	2–1	0–1
Samgurali-2	3–2	2–0	1–0	1–0	1–3	0–1	1–2	2–1	1–1	4–3		3–0	0–0	1–0	1–1	2–2
Skuri	0–0	1–0	1–2	1–0	2–1	0–1	3–3	3–0	4–1	3–0	1–0		2–2	4–1	2–3	4–4
Sulori	1–2	0–2	1–1	0–2	0–3	0–3	2–2	7–0	1–0	1–7	2–0	2–3		0–1	2–0	1–0
WIT Georgia-2	2–2	0–0	0–1	1–1	1–0	1–1	5–1	12–2	0–3	8–2	1–0	3–1	3–2		3–0	2–1
Zana	2–2	1–6	0–1	2–3	3–5	0–0	2–1	11–0	1–3	1–2	1–1	2–4	0–0	3–1		2–2
Zestaponi	4–5	1–4	0–1	2–2	1–2	1–3	1–3	1–0	2–3	3–4	0–3	1–2	4–1	1–1	2–1	

Source: Liga 4 results
Legend: Blue = home team win; Yellow = draw; Red = away team win.
