= Football Cup of the Georgian SSR =

Georgian SSR football cup

- Organiser(s): Football Federation of the Georgian SSR
- Founded: 1944
- Abolished: 1989 (reformed into Georgian Cup)
- Region: Georgian SSR (Soviet Union)
- Teams: Various
- Related competitions: Football Championship of the Georgian SSR
- Last champions: Shadrevani-83 (2nd title)
- Most championships: TTU Tbilisi (4 titles)

The Football Cup of the Georgian SSR (Georgian: საქართველოს სსრ საფეხბურთო თასი) was a playoff republican competition in association football which was held in the Georgian SSR from 1944 to 1989.

Tbilisi tram and trolleybus department team known as TTU were the only four-time winners of the competition. Guria and the Makharadze team under three different names lifted the cup three times each. The latter managed to reach the finals eleven times in total.

Shadrevani-83 were the last winners before Georgia broke away from the Soviet Football Federation and formed its own competitions. Starting from 1990, the Football Federation annually organizes the national cup.

The tournament did not include those clubs who played in first three tiers of Soviet Football and participated in the Soviet Cup, most notably Dinamo Tbilisi, who twice won the main cup competition of the Soviet Union in the late 1970s.

== Winners ==
- 1944: Dinamo Sokhumi
- 1945: Dinamo Sokhumi
- 1946: Petrel Tbilisi
- 1947: Dinamo Batumi
- 1948: Dinamo Sokhumi
- 1949: Factory of Dimitrov
- 1950: TODO Tbilisi
- 1951: Trud Tbilisi
- 1952: TTU Tbilisi
- 1953: Dinamo Kutaisi
- 1954: TTU Tbilisi
- 1955: Dinamo Kutaisi
- 1956: Locomotive Tbilisi
- 1957: TTU Tbilisi
- 1958: Dinamo Batumi
- 1959: Kolmeurne Makharadze
- 1960: Kolmeurne Makharadze
- 1961: SKIF Tbilisi
- 1962: Metalurgi Zestaponi
- 1963: Imereti Kutaisi
- 1964: Meshakhte Tkibuli
- 1965: Guria Lanchkhuti
- 1966: Guria Lanchkhuti
- 1968: Sinatle Tbilisi
- 1969: Senate Tbilisi
- 1970: Egrisi Tskhakaya
- 1971: Guria Lanchkhuti
- 1972: Kakheti Telavi
- 1973: Dinamo Zugdidi
- 1974: Metalurgi Rustavi
- 1975: SKIF Tbilisi
- 1976: Meshakhte Tkibuli
- 1977: Nadikvari Telavi
- 1978: Magaroeli Chiatura
- 1979: Magaroeli Chiatura
- 1980: Sulori Vani
- 1981: Sulori Vani
- 1982: Mertskhali Makharadze
- 1983: Zooveti Tbilisi
- 1984: Dinamo Zugdidi
- 1985: Imedi Tbilisi
- 1986: Madneuli Bolnisi
- 1987: Spartak Tskhinvali
- 1988: Shadrevani–83 Tskaltubo
- 1989: Shadrevani–83 Tskaltubo

== Finals ==
Year	Team1	Result	Team2
1944	Dinamo Sokhumi	1–0	Dinamo Kutaisi
1945	Lokomotivi Tbilisi	1–0	Dinamo Kutaisi
1946	Petrel Tbilisi	2–0	Dinamo Kutaisi
1947	Dinamo Batumi	2–0	Dinamo Sokhumi
1948	Dinamo Sokhumi	5–3	Dinamo Batumi
1949	Factory of Dimitrov	2–1	Dinamo Kutaisi
1950	TODO Tbilisi	5–1	Makharadze XI
1951	Trud Tbilisi	4–3	Dinamo Kutaisi
1952	TTU Tbilisi	2–0	Dinamo Batumi
1953	Dinamo Kutaisi	2–1	Metalurgi Rustavi
1954	TTU Tbilisi	3–0	Votnik Poti
1955	Dinamo Kutaisi	3–2	Kolmeurne Makharadze
1956	Lokomotivi Tbilisi	3–2	Dinamo Batumi
1957	TTU Tbilisi	1–0	Kolmeurne Makharadze
1958	Dinamo Batumi	1–0	Gantiadi Poti
1959	Kolmeurne Makharadze	1–1, 2–1	TTU Tbilisi
1960	Sikharuli Makharadze	4–0	Guria Lanchkhuti
1961	Infizkult Tbilisi	5–2	Imereti Kutaisi
1962	Metalurgi Zestafoni	1–1, 2–2, 2–1	Infizkult Tbilisi
1963	Imereti Kutaisi	2–1	Infizkult Tbilisi
1964	Meshakhte Tkibuli	2–0	Mertskhali Makharadze
1965	Guria Lanchkhuti	0–1, 3–0	Meskheti Akhaltsikhe
1966	Guria Lanchkhuti	1–0	Metalurgi Zestafoni
1967	Sinatle Tbilisi	n/a	Mertskhali Makharadze
1968	Sinatle Tbilisi	6–2	Peykari Tsulukidze
1969	Sinatle Tbilisi	2–1	Infizkult Tbilisi
1970	Egrisi Tskhakaya	3–1	Lokomotivi Samtredia
1971	Guria Lanchkhuti	3–3, 1–0	Metalurgi Zestafoni
1972	Kakheti Telavi	4–1	Dinamo Zugdidi
1973	Dinamo Zugdidi	4–0	Iveria Khashuri
1974	Metalurgi Rustavi	2–1	SKIF Tbilisi
1975	SKIF Tbilisi	3–1	Salkhino Gegechkori
1976	Meshakhte Tkibuli	1–0	Mertskhali Makharadze
1977	Nadikvari Telavi	2–1	SKIF Tbilisi
1978	Magaroeli Chiatura	3–1	Mziuri Gali
1979	Magaroeli Chiatura	3–1	SKIF Tbilisi
1980	Sulori Vani	2–0	Kakheti Telavi
1981	Sulori Vani	1–0	Mertskhali Makharadze
1982	Mertskhali Makharadze	4–1	Zooveti Tbilisi
1983	Zooveti Tbilisi	1–0	Samgurali Tskaltubo
1984	Dinamo Zugdidi	2–0	Mziuri Gali
1985	Imedi Tbilisi	1–0	Samegrelo Chkhorotsku
1986	Madneuli Bolnisi	2–0	Samegrelo Chkhorotsku
1987	Spartak Tskhinvali	1–0	Mertskhali Makharadze
1988	Shadrevani-83 Tskaltubo	1–0	Madneuli Bolnisi
1989	Shadrevani-83 Tskaltubo	1–0	Spartak Tskhinvali
