= FC Olimpiki Tbilisi =

- Full name: Football Club Olimpiki Tbilisi
- Ground: Olimpi Stadium; Tbilisi, Georgia
- Capacity: 3,000
- League: Pirveli Liga East
- 2007–08: 9th
Home colours

FC Olimpiki Tbilisi is a Georgian football team, which were playing in the capital, Tbilisi. The club were playing their home games at Olimpi Stadium.

== History ==
Founded as FSM Tbilisi.

- 1957: Renamed as Burevestnik Tbilisi
- 2000: Founded as FC Olimpi Tbilisi.
- 2003: Merged with Merani-91 Tbilisi, as Merani-Olimpi Tbilisi,
- 2003: Second team of FC Tbilisi as Olimpi Tbilisi played in Pirveli Liga.
- 2005: Closed.
- 2006: Reactivated as Olimpiki Tbilisi.

=== Seasons ===
- 2000–01: Olimpi Tbilisi Regionuli Liga
- 2001–02: Olimpi Tbilisi Regionuli Liga
- 2002–03: Olimpi Tbilisi Regionuli Liga
- 2003–04: Olimpi Tbilisi Pirveli Liga
- 2004–05: Olimpi Tbilisi Pirveli Liga
- 2005–06:
- 2006–07: Olimpiki Tbilisi Meore Liga
- 2007–08: Olimpiki Tbilisi Pirveli Liga
