= 2024 Liga 4 (Georgia) =

Football season in Georgia

Liga 4
- Season: 2024
- Dates: 2 April – 27 November
- Champions: Didube
- Promoted: Didube; Odishi 1919; Margveti 2006
- Relegated: Varketili-2; Merani Tbilisi-2; Chikhura
- Matches: 210
- Goals: 855 (4.07 per match)
- Top goalscorer: Jumber Khmelidze (Margveti 2006) (44 goals)
- Biggest home win: Varketili-2 10–1 Mertskhali (27 November)
- Biggest away win: Zana 0–9 Samgurali-2 (17 April)
- Highest scoring: Samgurali-2 10–3 Merani Tbilisi-2 (8 May)
- Longest winning run: Didube (8 matches)
- Longest unbeaten run: Didube (11)
- Longest winless run: Chikhura (17)
- Longest losing run: Chikhura (16)
- All statistics correct as of complete.

The 2024 Liga 4 season was the 6th edition of fourth-tier football in Georgia under its current title. It began on 2 April and ended on 27 November.

The season consisted of 30 rounds with each team playing 28 matches. In late October, the top three teams gained promotion to Liga 3 with four matches still to play. By the same date, two of the three lowest-finishing teams bound for relegation to Regionuli Liga were determined.

It was the only national division where no after-season play-offs were held.

== Team changes ==
The following teams changed division after the previous season:

=== To Liga 4 ===
Relegated from Liga 3

Merani Tbilisi-2 • Chikhura

Promoted from Regionuli Liga

Didube • Gagra-2 • Mertskhali • Zana

=== From Liga 4 ===
Promoted to Liga 3

Gonio • Betlemi • Gardabani

Relegated to Regionuli Liga

Kolkheti-2 • Dinamo Zugdidi

== Teams and locations ==
Location of Liga 4 football clubs in 2024

This season was scheduled to start with sixteen participating teams, but Shukura, demoted by the Federation from the 2nd division on 11 January 2024, did not enter the competition.

Three out of fifteen teams participating in the league had been members of the first tier:

- Chikhura (2012–20)
- Sulori (1991, 1991–92)
- Mertskhali (1990–92, 2003–04).

Six more spots were occupied by reserve teams of higher league clubs.

Chikhura, Gagra-2, Mertskhali and Zana made their first appearances in Liga 4 this season.

Club	Position last season	Location	Region	Venue
Algeti	9th	Marneuli	Kvemo Kartli	Centraluri
Chikhura	16th in Liga 3	Sachkhere	Imereti	Dzveli stadioni
Didube	1st in Regionuli Liga A	Tbilisi	Tbilisi	Centraluri, Kaspi
Gagra-2	1st in Regionuli Liga B	Tbilisi	Tbilisi	Centraluri, Mukhrani
Margveti 2006	5th	Zestaponi	Imereti	Murtaz and Soso Abashidzeebi, Kharagauli
Merani Martvili-2	7th	Martvili	Samegrelo-Z.Svaneti	Murtaz Khurtsilava stadium
Merani Tbilisi-2	15th in Liga 3	Tbilisi	Tbilisi	Shromiti rezervebi
Mertskhali	1st in Regionuli Liga C	Ozurgeti	Guria	Megobroba
Odishi 1919	4th	Zugdidi	Samegrelo-Z.Svaneti	Centraluri, Ganmukhuri
Samgurali-2	6th	Tskaltubo	Imereti	26 May stadium
Skuri	12th	Tsalenjikha	Samegrelo-Z.Svaneti	Sasha Kvaratskhelia stadium
Sulori	8th	Vani	Imereti	Grigol Nikoleishvili stadium
Varketili-2	11th	Tbilisi	Tbilisi	Marakana
WIT Georgia-2	10th	Tbilisi	Tbilisi	Mtskheta Park, Mtskheta
Zana	Regionuli Liga PO winner	Abasha	Samegrelo-Z.Svaneti	Mevlud Miminoshvili stadium

== League table ==
Pos	Team	Pld	W	D	L	GF	GA	GD	Pts	Promotion, qualification or relegation
1	Didube (P, C)	28	22	3	3	78	16	+62	69	Promotion to Liga 3
2	Margveti 2006 (P)	28	20	2	6	96	46	+50	62	Promotion to Liga 3
3	Odishi 1919 (P)	28	20	1	7	87	34	+53	61	Promotion to Liga 3
4	Samgurali-2	28	15	1	12	83	53	+30	46	
5	Sulori	28	13	4	11	53	49	+4	43	
6	Skuri	28	13	3	12	55	60	−5	42	
7	Zana	28	13	1	14	51	59	−8	40	
8	Merani Martvili-2	28	12	3	13	52	54	−2	39	
9	Gagra-2	28	12	3	13	49	41	+8	39	
10	Algeti	28	12	3	13	38	52	−14	39	
11	Mertskhali	28	11	4	13	57	64	−7	37	
12	WIT Georgia-2	28	11	4	13	56	50	+6	37	
13	Varketili-2 (R)	28	11	3	14	57	62	−5	36	Relegation to Regionuli Liga
14	Merani Tbilisi-2 (R)	28	5	1	22	23	98	−75	16	Relegation to Regionuli Liga
15	Chikhura (R)	28	2	0	26	20	117	−97	6	Relegation to Regionuli Liga

Source: gff.ge
Rules for classification: 1) Points; 2) Head-to-head points; 3) Head-to-head goal difference; 4) Head-to-head goals scored; 5) Head-to-head away goals scored (only if two teams); 6) Goal difference; 7) Goals scored.
(C) Champions; (P) Promoted; (R) Relegated

=== Results ===
Home \ Away	ALG	CHI	DID	GAG	MRG	MRN	MRT	MER	ODS	SMG	SKR	SUL	VAR	WIT	ZAN
Algeti		5–1	0–3	2–0	3–2	2–0	4–0	1–2	1–3	1–0	2–2	3–0	1–2	1–1	0–3
Chikhura	0–3		0–2	0–4	1–4	1–4	0–2	2–1	1–3	2–7	1–3	0–4	0–4	1–5	0–2
Didube	6–0	7–0		2–0	3–1	5–0	4–0	5–2	1–0	4–1	7–0	3–2	1–1	2–0	2–0
Gagra-2	1–1	4–1	0–2		1–2	1–2	0–1	0–4	2–0	2–0	3–0	7–1	2–2	1–1	1–3
Margveti 2006	5–0	7–1	1–0	3–2		7–0	1–0	3–3	2–1	1–0	3–4	6–3	3–1	1–0	5–1
Merani Martvili-2	4–0	4–0	1–2	0–2	4–1		2–0	2–0	1–5	2–1	3–2	1–3	0–2	3–1	3–3
Merani Tbilisi-2	3–1	1–4	0–2	1–3	1–9	1–1		0–4	0–2	1–6	0–2	0–3	3–2	0–6	3–2
Mertskhali	0–1	5–1	2–1	2–0	2–7	1–0	5–0		0–1	3–1	2–2	1–2	1–1	3–1	0–2
Odishi 1919	4–0	8–0	2–2	3–1	5–1	1–0	7–0	5–4		2–0	4–0	7–1	8–2	3–2	3–1
Samgurali-2	4–0	9–3	1–5	2–3	2–7	5–2	10–3	2–1	0–2		4–1	5–0	3–2	3–1	1–0
Skuri	3–1	2–0	2–1	0–1	2–4	0–3	3–0	4–1	5–3	0–0		1–0	4–1	1–2	2–1
Sulori	3–0	3–0	0–0	0–1	2–2	1–1	5–3	4–1	1–0	0–2	3–1		4–1	2–2	0–1
Varketili-2	0–1	5–0	0–3	2–1	1–4	1–7	2–1	10–1	3–2	1–3	5–4	0–1		2–1	3–0
WIT Georgia-2	0–3	4–0	0–2	0–4	5–0	4–1	3–1	2–2	1–3	4–2	0–2	3–0	1–0		3–0
Zana	0–1	5–0	0–1	4–2	0–5	2–1	4–1	2–3	2–0	0–9	4–3	0–3	2–1	7–3	

Source: Liga 4 results
Legend: Blue = home team win; Yellow = draw; Red = away team win.
