= 2021 Liga 4 (Georgia) =

Football season in Georgia

Liga 4
- Season: 2021
- Dates: 30 March – 22 November 2021
- Champions: Dinamo Tbilisi-2
- Promoted: Dinamo Tbilisi-2; Zestaponi; Borjomi; Irao
- Relegated: Torpedo Kutaisi-2; Tbilisi; Imereti; Egrisi
- Matches: 280
- Goals: 848 (3.03 per match)
- Top goalscorer: Giga Ambroladze (Zestaponi); 22 goals
- Biggest home win: Shturmi 12-0 Tbilisi; 22 November
- Biggest away win: Samegrelo 0-8 Dinamo-2; 26 May
- Highest scoring: Shturmi 12-0 Tbilisi; 22 November
- Longest winning run: Borjomi (9 matches)
- Longest unbeaten run: Borjomi (11)
- Longest winless run: Egrisi (27)
- Longest losing run: Egrisi (19)

The 2021 Liga 4 was the third season of fourth-tier football in Georgia under its current title. The season began on 30 March and ended on 22 November.

== Team changes ==
The following teams have changed division since the previous season:

=== To Liga 4 ===
Promoted from Regionuli Liga

Torpedo Kutaisi-2 • Merani Martvili-2 • Irao Tbilisi • Dinamo Tbilisi-2 • Matchakhela • Tbilisi • Margveti 2006 • Shturmi

=== From Liga 4 ===
Promoted to Liga 3

Varketili Tbilisi • Didube Tbilisi • Merani-2 Tbilisi • Magaroeli

== Teams, results and league tables ==
Locations of Liga 4 football clubs in 2021

The season consisted of two phases. After the draw twenty teams were initially split into White and Red groups.

=== Part 1 ===
The first part lasted six months with the teams playing eighteen games each.

Red Group
| Pos | Team | 1 | 2 | 3 | 4 | 5 | 6 | 7 | 8 | 9 | 10 | W | D | L | GF–GA | P |
|---|---|---|---|---|---|---|---|---|---|---|---|---|---|---|---|---|
| 1 | Borjomi | ---- | 1-1 | 3-0 | 1-0 | 2-0 | 1-1 | 4-1 | 6-0 | 4-2 | 4-0 | 13 | 3 | 2 | 46-16 | 42 |
| 2 | Irao | 1-2 | ---- | 1-1 | 6-3 | 2-0 | 1-1 | 2-0 | 1-0 | 5-0 | 4-1 | 11 | 5 | 2 | 41-18 | 38 |
| 3 | Skuri | 2-3 | 1-4 | ---- | 5-1 | 4-0 | 2-2 | 1-0 | 2-1 | 1-1 | 4-0 | 9 | 4 | 5 | 32-23 | 31 |
| 4 | Margveti 2006 | 0-1 | 1-1 | 3-2 | ---- | 1-0 | 2-2 | 4-3 | 2-2 | 4-2 | 3-2 | 8 | 5 | 5 | 36-33 | 29 |
| 5 | Sulori | 2-0 | 3-1 | 3-0 | 0-0 | ---- | 0-0 | 2-1 | 2-0 | 9-0 | 0-2 | 8 | 5 | 5 | 31-15 | 29 |
| 6 | Algeti | 2-4 | 0-1 | 1-1 | 3-1 | 1-1 | ---- | 1-3 | 3-1 | 3-0 | 9-0 | 6 | 9 | 3 | 40-23 | 27 |
| 7 | Tbilisi | 3-2 | 2-5 | 0-1 | 2-3 | 0-6 | 3-3 | ---- | 2-1 | 6-0 | 2-1 | 6 | 1 | 11 | 32-41 | 19 |
| 8 | Merani-2 | 1-1 | 1-1 | 0-1 | 1-1 | 1-1 | 1-5 | 0-1 | ---- | 4-0 | 5-0 | 3 | 6 | 9 | 22-31 | 15 |
| 9 | Imereti | 0-2 | 1-2 | 0-2 | 0-2 | 0-0 | 0-2 | 3-2 | 1-2 | ---- | 0-0 | 2 | 3 | 13 | 12-51 | 9 |
| 10 | Egrisi | 0-5 | 0-2 | 0-2 | 0-5 | 0-2 | 1-1 | 2-1 | 1-1 | 1-2 | ---- | 2 | 3 | 13 | 11-52 | 9 |

White Group
| Pos | Team | 1 | 2 | 3 | 4 | 5 | 6 | 7 | 8 | 9 | 10 | W | D | L | GF–GA | P |
|---|---|---|---|---|---|---|---|---|---|---|---|---|---|---|---|---|
| 1 | Dinamo-2 | ---- | 3-0 | 3-0 | 2-1 | 3-0 | 2-3 | 7-1 | 4-0 | 6-0 | 2-2 | 14 | 2 | 2 | 62-10 | 44 |
| 2 | Zestaponi | 1-1 | ---- | 1-0 | 1-0 | 3-0 | 3-1 | 5-1 | 4-0 | 0-0 | 5-2 | 12 | 5 | 1 | 41-15 | 41 |
| 3 | Betlemi | 0-2 | 1-1 | ---- | 0-2 | 1-0 | 5-0 | 2-0 | 4-1 | 4-0 | 9-0 | 10 | 2 | 6 | 32-17 | 32 |
| 4 | Iberia | 0-5 | 1-2 | 0-1 | ---- | 0-1 | 3-0 | 2-1 | 1-2 | 3-0 | 8-0 | 10 | 0 | 8 | 34-21 | 30 |
| 5 | WIT Georgia-2 | 1-0 | 0-1 | 1-0 | 2-0 | ---- | 1-1 | 0-1 | 4-2 | 2-1 | 8-0 | 9 | 2 | 7 | 28-22 | 29 |
| 6 | Odishi 1919 | 1-5 | 0-2 | 1-1 | 0-1 | 0-2 | ---- | 2-1 | 1-0 | 3-0 | 6-1 | 9 | 2 | 7 | 29-32 | 29 |
| 7 | Matchakhela | 0-4 | 3-3 | 1-2 | 2-3 | 3-1 | 1-2 | ---- | 3-1 | 2-1 | 8-0 | 6 | 1 | 11 | 35-41 | 19 |
| 8 | Shturmi | 0-2 | 1-2 | 2-0 | 2-3 | 2-2 | 3-4 | 3-2 | ---- | 3-1 | 7-0 | 5 | 2 | 11 | 29-37 | 17 |
| 9 | Torpedo-2 | 0-3 | 0-0 | 0-1 | 0-1 | 4-0 | 1-2 | 1-3 | 1-0 | ---- | 1-2 | 3 | 2 | 13 | 16-35 | 11 |
| 10 | Samegrelo | 0-8 | 0-7 | 1-3 | 0-5 | 0-3 | 0-2 | 2-1 | 1-1 | 0-4 | ---- | 2 | 2 | 14 | 11-88 | 8 |

Following this two-round tournament the top five clubs formed the Promotion Group while the bottom five took part in the Relegation Round.

=== Part 2 ===
Despite being in the same group, at this stage no matches were held between the teams who faced each other in Phase 1. Besides, from the previous round the clubs retained only those points obtained in matches against such opponents. It took another seven weeks before each team played ten matches. At the end the four teams advanced to Liga 3 and another four dropped down to Regionuli Liga.

Promotion Group
| Pos | Team | 1 | 2 | 3 | 4 | 5 | 6 | 7 | 8 | 9 | 10 | W | D | L | GF–GA | P | Notes |
|---|---|---|---|---|---|---|---|---|---|---|---|---|---|---|---|---|---|
| 1 | Dinamo-2 | ---- | | 3-0 | 3-1 | | | 4-0 | | 5-0 | 1-0 | 14 | 1 | 3 | 44-6 | 43 | Promoted to Liga 3 |
| 2 | Zestaponi | | ---- | 1-0 | 0-1 | | | 3-0 | | 6-1 | 2-1 | 11 | 4 | 3 | 35-13 | 37 | Promoted to Liga 3 |
| 3 | Borjomi | 1-0 | 2-2 | ---- | | 2-0 | 5-1 | | 2-2 | | | 11 | 3 | 4 | 30-19 | 36 | Promoted to Liga 3 |
| 4 | Irao | 1-0 | 0-0 | | ---- | 1-0 | 2-0 | | 4-1 | | | 9 | 5 | 4 | 31-20 | 32 | Promoted to Liga 3 |
| 5 | Betlemi | | | 2-0 | 2-2 | ---- | | 3-2 | | 2-0 | 5-1 | 8 | 2 | 8 | 23-23 | 26 | |
| 6 | WIT Georgia-2 | | | 1-2 | 2-1 | | ---- | 0-0 | | 6-1 | 6-2 | 8 | 1 | 9 | 26-25 | 25 | |
| 7 | Sulori | 0-2 | 2-0 | | | 2-0 | 2-1 | ---- | 2-3 | | | 7 | 2 | 9 | 21-27 | 23 | |
| 8 | Iberia | | | 1-3 | 0-1 | | | 1-3 | ---- | 1-0 | 3-1 | 5 | 2 | 11 | 23-34 | 17 | |
| 9 | Skuri | 0-3 | 0-5 | | | 2-4 | 2-1 | | 1-4 | ---- | | 3 | 1 | 14 | 22-55 | 10 | |
| 10 | Margveti 2006 | 0-4 | 0-6 | | | 1-2 | 0-3 | | 3-3 | | ---- | 2 | 3 | 13 | 18-51 | 9 | |

Relegation Group
| Pos | Team | 1 | 2 | 3 | 4 | 5 | 6 | 7 | 8 | 9 | 10 | W | D | L | GF–GA | P | Notes |
|---|---|---|---|---|---|---|---|---|---|---|---|---|---|---|---|---|---|
| 1 | Odishi 1919 | ---- | 0-2 | | | 0-3 | | | 2-1 | 4-1 | 2-1 | 13 | 1 | 4 | 36-25 | 40 | |
| 2 | Merani-2 | 4-0 | ---- | 3-1 | 3-2 | | 2-0 | 5-0 | | | | 11 | 2 | 5 | 40-20 | 35 | |
| 3 | Shturmi | | 1-1 | ---- | | 3-1 | | | 12-0 | 4-0 | 9-0 | 10 | 3 | 5 | 61-21 | 33 | |
| 4 | Samegrelo | | 1-2 | | ---- | 6-1 | | | 5-2 | 6-2 | 3-0 | 10 | 1 | 7 | 44-43 | 31 | |
| 5 | Algeti | 4-0 | | 2-2 | 0-1 | ---- | 2-1 | 3-0 | | | | 9 | 3 | 6 | 47-28 | 30 | |
| 6 | Matchakhela | | 1-0 | | | 4-3 | ---- | | 1-1 | 2-2 | 6-0 | 9 | 3 | 6 | 45-24 | 30 | |
| 7 | Torpedo-2 | | 1-3 | | | 2-1 | | ---- | 4-0 | 5-1 | 5-1 | 9 | 0 | 9 | 34-33 | 27 | Relegated to Reg.Liga |
| 8 | Tbilisi | 1-1 | | 1-5 | 1-4 | | 1-1 | 3-4 | ---- | | | 5 | 4 | 9 | 31-50 | 19 | Relegated to Reg.Liga |
| 9 | Imereti | 0-2 | | 0-1 | 0-4 | | 1-4 | 0-1 | | ---- | | 2 | 2 | 14 | 13-53 | 8 | Relegated to Reg.Liga |
| 10 | Egrisi | 1-3 | | 0-5 | 2-6 | | 0-4 | 1-2 | | | ---- | 1 | 3 | 14 | 12-66 | 6 | Relegated to Reg.Liga |

Notes:

• Whenever the teams finished with an equal number of points, head-to-head results, including away goals, were considered next while determining a league position.

• Although Algeti are formally registered in Marneuli, the team played all their home games of the season in Tbilisi.
