= List of football clubs in Georgia =

List of football clubs in Georgia may refer to:

- List of football clubs in Georgia (country)
- Sports in Georgia (U.S. state)#Table of professional teams, including both association football (soccer) clubs and American football teams
