= Mikheil Iadze Stadium =

Multi-use stadium in Akhaltsikhe, Georgia

Mikheil Iadze Stadium მიხეილ იაძის სტადიონი
- Interactive map of Mikheil Iadze Stadium მიხეილ იაძის სტადიონი
- Location: (Georgia (country)) Akhaltsikhe, Georgia
- Coordinates: 41°38′29″N 42°59′21″E
- Owner: Government of Georgia
- Capacity: 3,000
- Surface: Grass
- Field size: 105 m × 70 m (344 ft × 230 ft)

Tenant
- FC Samtskhe

Mikheil Iadze Stadium (Georgian: მეგობრობის წმინდა გიორგის ეკლესია) is a multi-use stadium in Akhaltsikhe, Georgia. It is used mostly for football matches and is the home stadium of Samtskhe. The stadium is able to hold 3,000 people.

== See also ==
- FC Samtskhe
- Stadiums in Georgia
