= FC Locomotive Tbilisi-2 =

Football Club Locomotive-2
- Founded: 1936; 89 years ago
- Ground: Olympic Complex, Tbilisi, Georgia
- Chairman: Alex Topuria
- Coach: Giorgi Minashvili
- League: Liga 4
- 2025: 13th of 16 (relegated)
- Website: fcloco.ge
Home colours	Away colours	Third colours

FC Locomotive-2 (Georgian: სკ ლოკომოტივი-2) is a Georgian football team based in Tbilisi. Following the 2025 season, they were demoted to 4th division of Georgian football.

Locomotive-2 are the winners of three different divisions and have reached the final of the Georgian Cup. Founded in 1936, they are the reserve team of Locomotive.

== History ==
Locomotive-2 first featured in the 2nd division of Georgia football in 1999. With the first team high-flying in the Umaglesi Liga, the reserves were ineligible for promotion. Yet, the latter won their eastern group in the 1999–2000 season and later spent another four seasons in the league.

As the two-time national league runners-up and three-time cup holders, Locomotive experienced a significant revival in the mid-2010s. While the first team managed to return to the top-tier after a four-year absence, the second team won the last championship held among the reserve teams. Meanwhile, the club created its football academy in 2015 and formed 12 age groups starting from six.

Locomotive-2 took part in the 2016 Meore Liga and stayed unbeaten up until the last round. Based on regulations adopted for this transitional season to spring-autumn system, the team needed at least a draw against Algeti to stay up although suffered a heavy defeat.

In 2017, Locomotive-2 entered the Regionuli Liga tournament for the first time. Under coach Vladimer Vashadze, they were contenders in the title race and as runners-up of Group C qualified for playoffs where they lost to Aragvi on penalties.

The team skipped next three seasons before re-joining the league in 2021. With a single loss in 23 matches, Locomotive-2 eased past their rivals to automatically advance to Liga 4 where they did not stay longer than one year. After a fine start to the season which included a nine-game unbeaten run and seven consecutive wins, Loco-2 achieved a one-point advantage over Shturmi to become champions for the second time in a row.

But it was their incredible cup campaign that attracted a huge attention in 2022. Initially, Locomotive-2 inflicted a shock defeat on Samgurali, the runners-up of the previous cup season. Then, Telavi's cup journey came to an abrupt end as they lost on penalties. The reigning champions Saburtalo, heavy favourites to come out on top, similarly failed to beat the 4th division side and with no goals in extra time, the semi-final went to a penalty shoot-out, which produced an all-time biggest Georgian cup upset. Although Loco-2 went on to lose to Torpedo Kutaisi, they made history by knocking out three top-flight teams and reaching the final, especially given that the first team was eliminated by a 2nd division side in the round of 16 and, besides, suffered relegation from the Erovnuli Liga.

Locomotive-2 spent three seasons in Liga 3, generally floating around mid-table. They were demoted to Liga 4 after the 2025 season, following the relegation of the senior team from the 2nd division.

== Seasons ==
Year	League	Pos	M	W	D	L	GF–GA	Pts	Domestic Cup
2021	Regionuli Liga, A	↑1st of 24	23	19	3	1	78–16	60	3rd round
2022	Liga 4	↑1st of 16	30	21	5	4	82–40	68	Runners-up
2023	Liga 3	10th of 16	30	10	5	15	50–42	35	1st round
2024	Liga 3	9th of 16	30	12	4	14	47–58	40	Round of 16
2025	Liga 3	13th of 16↓	30	8	3	19	43–68	27	1st round

== Squad ==
As of 25 May 2025 Note: Flags indicate national team as defined under FIFA eligibility rules; some limited exceptions apply. Players may hold more than one non-FIFA nationality.

No.	Pos.	Nation	Player
2	DF	GEO	Nikoloz Chokheli (C)
3	DF	GEO	Nikoloz Surguladze
5	DF	GEO	Nikusha Shavadze
6	DF	GEO	Luka Geladze
7	MF	GEO	Giorgi Gelashvili
8	MF	GEO	Ioane Tabatadze
9	FW	GEO	Datuna Chighoshvili
10	MF	GEO	Nikoloz Ninidze
11	FW	ZAM	Bonephanseo Phiri
12	DF	GEO	Noe Sichinava

No.	Pos.	Nation	Player
13	MF	GEO	Andria Kobuladze
14	FW	GEO	Roman Kartvelishvili
17	MF	GEO	Giorgi Khachidze
18	MF	GEO	Luka Jojua
19	FW	GEO	Saba Marsagishvili
20	MF	GEO	Nikoloz Kemoklidze
23	GK	GEO	Otar Doghadze
25	GK	GEO	Givi Tsiklauri
26	DF	GEO	Nikoloz Berulava
31	MF	GEO	Dachi Gogoli

== Managers ==
Name	Nat.	From	To
Aleksandre Intskirveli	(Georgia (country))	2021	2021
Lasha Tchagiashvili	(Georgia (country))	2022	2022
Giorgi Minashvili	(Georgia (country))	2023	2023
Lasha Tchagiashvili (2)	(Georgia (country))	2023	2023
Davit Khatiri	(Georgia (country))	2024	2024
Giorgi Minashvili (2)	(Georgia (country))	2025	

== Honours ==
League

Pirveli Liga (level 2)

- Winners: 1999–2000, East B

Liga 4 (level 4)

- Winners: 2022

Regionuli Liga (level 5)

- Winners: 2021, Group A

Cup

Georgian Cup

- Runners-up: 2022

== See also ==
- Locomotive - First team
