= FC West Georgia =

Georgian association football club

Football Club West Georgia
- Founded: 2024; 2 years ago
- Ground: Leonidze football ground Batumi, Adjara, Georgia
- Chairman: Dursun Beridze
- Coach: Valerian Tevdoradze
- League: Liga 4
- 2025: 1st of 16 in Regionuli Liga C (promoted)

FC West Georgia (Georgian: საფეხბურთო კლუბი ვესტ ჯორჯია) is a Georgian association football club based in Batumi, Adjara.

They started competing in the lowest division of Georgian football in 2025 and following a successful league campaign advanced to Liga 4 in their debut season. A year later, the team sealed promotion to the 3rd tier.

== History ==
West Georgia was initially founded as a football school with various age groups for children. Along with the academy, a professional club was also created. 31-year-old Valerian Tevdoradze, who had made 221 appearances for Dinamo Batumi during his career, took charge of the team, which entered the 2025 Regionuli Liga tournament.

During their first league campaign, West Georgia competed for a promotion spot against far more experienced rivals such as the reserve teams of Dinamo Batumi and Torpedo Kutaisi. They managed to remain unbeaten throughout the season, produced a nineteen-game winning streak and on 13 November 2025, following a 13–0 win over Khoni 2024, gained automatic promotion to Liga 4 with 26 wins out of 28 matches and a remarkable goal difference (+120).

West Georgia looked impressive in the 4th division as well, being the only team without a single loss by the summer break. In 2026, they also made a debut in the Georgian Cup, knocking out two opponents before being halted by a 2nd-league club. Ultimately, West Georgia's unbeaten league run comprised 52 games (43W, 9D), which turned out to be the longest in Georgian football. In early November, with three games still in hand, they gained promotion to Liga 3.

== Seasons ==
Year	League	Pos	M	W	D	L	GF–GA	Pts	Domestic Cup
2025	Regionuli Liga C	1st of 16↑	30	28	2	0	131–11	86	–
2026	Liga 4								2nd round

== Squad ==
As of 25 April 2026

Note: Flags indicate national team as defined under FIFA eligibility rules; some limited exceptions apply. Players may hold more than one non-FIFA nationality.

No.	Pos.	Nation	Player
1	GK	GEO	Zurab Kezheradze
3	DF	GEO	Vasiko Bachilava
4	DF	GEO	Lasha Turmanidze
5	DF	GEO	Demetre Komakhidze
6	MF	GEO	Giorgi Khutsishvili
7	MF	GEO	Karlo Jikidze
8	MF	GEO	Beka Kartvelishvili
9	FW	GEO	Zurab Beridze
10	MF	GEO	Nikoloz Gabadze
11	FW	GEO	Luka Tsagareishvili

No.	Pos.	Nation	Player
13	MF	GEO	Tornike Jimsheleishvili
16	FW	GEO	Tornike Kuprava
17	MF	GEO	Giorgi Kutelia (C)
19	FW	GEO	Beka Chkuaseli
20	MF	GEO	Albert Madoyan
21	MF	GEO	Irakli Kromlidi
22	FW	GEO	Zura Shavlakadze
24	MF	GEO	Revaz Mikeladze
27	DF	GEO	Beka Beridze
28	GK	GEO	Kakhaber Meshveliani

== Club Staff ==
Position	Name
General Director	Dursun Beridze
Sport director	Merab Tebidze
Head coach	Vako Tevdoradze
Assistant coach	Tornike Burkadze
Goalkeeper coach	

== Managers ==
Name	Nat.	From	To
Valerian Tevdoradze	(Georgia (country))	2024	

== Honours ==
Regionuli Liga

- Champions: 2025, Group C

== Stadium ==
During its inaugural season, the team used its own covered stadium for training sessions and held official matches at the Leonidze football ground situated in Batumi. For Liga 4 games, West Georgia relocated to Chele Arena in Kobuleti.
