= FC Zooveti =

FC Zooveti Tbilisi
- Full name: Football Club Zooveti Tbilisi
- Short name: Zooveti
- Founded: August 9, 1975
- Ground: Sports Academy Stadium, Tbilisi
- Capacity: 1,000
- Chairman: Sergo Kutateladze
- Manager: Jemal Gugushvili
- League: Regionuli Liga
- 2025: Regionuli Liga, 7th
Home colours	Away colours

FC Zooveti Tbilisi (Georgian: საფეხბურთო კლუბი ზოოვეტი) is a Georgian football club that is based in Tbilisi. In 2026 Regionuli Liga georgian championship, where they are currently playing.

== Achievements ==
- Regionuli Liga : 2026

== history ==
The complete history of FC Zooveti Tbilisi from 1975 to the present is a classic story of Georgian footballing passion, resilience, and grassroots dedication. Even though the club has never broken into the country's top tier, it has carved out its own unique legacy in domestic football. The complete timeline, milestones, and foundational elements of the club include:

The club was officially founded on August 9, 1975. The unique name "Zooveti" stems directly from its origins—it was established under the sports department of the Tbilisi Zootechnical-Veterinary Teaching and Research Institute. Because of this, the core of the squad was traditionally composed of students, faculty, and local youth from the university ecosystem.

FC Zooveti has always maintained a strong geographical connection to Tbilisi's academic sports landscape: The club's registered administrative headquarters is located at 71 Chavchavadze Avenue, within the campus of the State Teaching University of Physical Education and Sports of Georgia. Their long-time home venue is the Sports Academy Stadium, a compact arena with a capacity of 1,000 spectators where the team continues to host its league matches.

The club's survival and continuity over the decades are credited almost entirely to two loyal figures who dedicated their careers to the team: Sergo Kutateladze: The long-serving club chairman who managed the financial stability, registrations, and administrative tasks required to keep the lower-tier side operational. Jemal Gugushvili: The legendary head coach of the club. Under his tactical guidance, Zooveti navigated decades of challenging regional campaigns and engineered the club's greatest modern triumphs.

The absolute sporting pinnacle for the club arrived during the 2010/11 season: Competing in the Georgian Meore Liga (Second League - East Zone), FC Zooveti put together a dominant league campaign to finish at the top of the table as champions. This title victory earned them a historic automatic promotion to the Pirveli Liga (First League, now known as Erovnuli Liga 2), pushing the amateur student club into professional national-level football.

Following their rise to the higher tiers, Zooveti got the chance to test themselves against legendary Georgian clubs in the knockout rounds of the David Kipiani Georgian Cup: August 2010: They hosted top-flight Umaglesi Liga regulars Sioni Bolnisi, bowing out after a highly respectable and hard-fought 0–2 defeat. August 2011: In the Cup's Round of 32, they drew FC Tskhinvali. After dropping the first leg 0–4, Zooveti showed tremendous pride in the return leg, fighting back to secure a memorable 2–2 draw, which remains one of the proudest single match results in club history.

Following several seasons in the national leagues, the realities of limited financial backing and sponsorship caught up with the club, leading to an eventual relegation back to the lower echelons. Today, FC Zooveti remains highly active and continues to compete stably in the Georgian Regional League. True to its original 1975 roots, the club focuses on developing young, local Georgian talent, keeping its historical identity alive on the pitches of Tbilisi.

== Current squad ==
Note: Flags indicate national team as defined under FIFA eligibility rules; some limited exceptions apply. Players may hold more than one non-FIFA nationality.

No.	Pos.	Nation	Player
1	GK		(Georgia (country)) Giorgi Kalandadze
12	GK		(Georgia (country)) Luka Beridze
2	DF		(Georgia (country)) Soso Javakhishvili
3	DF		(Georgia (country)) Levan Tskitishvili
4	DF		(Georgia (country)) Giga Khurtsidze
5	DF		(Georgia (country)) Beka Mchedlidze
6	MF		(Georgia (country)) Zurab Lomtadze
7	MF		(Georgia (country)) Irakli Gagua
8	MF		(Georgia (country)) Tornike Kapanadze
10	MF		(Georgia (country)) Nika Gelashvili
11	FW		(Georgia (country)) Davit Maisuradze
9	FW		(Georgia (country)) Temur Chkheidze
14	FW		(Georgia (country)) Sandro Kandelaki
