= FC Abuli Akhalkalaki =

- Founded: 2001
- Ground: Tsentraluri stadioni Akhalkalaki, Georgia
- Capacity: 2,000
- Head Coach: Rafael Darbinian
- League: Regionuli Liga
- 2025: 3rd of 14, Regionuli Liga B

FC Abuli (Georgian: საფეხბურთო კლუბი აბული) is a Georgian association football club based in Akhalkalaki which currently competes in Regionuli Liga, the fifth tier of the Georgian league system.

== History ==
Established in 2001, Abuli as a municipal club started taking part in Georgian league tournaments after 2009.

After the 2016 transitional season to the Spring-Autumn system the team was relegated from Liga 3. Since then they have been competing in Regionuli Liga.

== Recent seasons ==
Season	League	M	W	D	L	GF–GA	P	Pos
2012–13	Meore Liga, East	26	11	7	8	44–40	40	6th of 14
2013–14	Meore Liga, East	30	14	4	12	52–63	46	7th of 16
2014–15	Meore Liga, Centre	25	9	3	13	39–51	30	8th of 16
2015–16	Meore Liga, Centre	28	9	4	15	33–60	31	10th of 15
2016*	Meore Liga, Centre	14	3	2	9	12–34	11	6th of 8
2017	Regionuli Liga	22	2	3	17	12–61	9	14th of 14
2018	Regionuli Liga, East B	16	7	1	8	22–40	22	5th of 9
2019	Regionuli Liga, East A	14	5	5	4	27–19	20	3rd of 9
2020	Regionuli Liga, East A	13	1	2	10	12–36	5	14th of 14
2021	Regionuli Liga, East	23	6	2	15	32–54	20	21st of 24
2022	Regionuli Liga, East A	26	12	5	9	57–44	41	5th of 14
2023	Regionuli Liga, East B	20	8	4	8	37–41	28	7th of 11
2024	Regionuli Liga, B	24	11	3	10	55–54	36	7th of 13
2025	Regionuli Liga, B	26	16	2	8	66–43	50	3rd of 14

Note: *Relegated

== Name ==
Abuli is a mountain peak situated at 3,301m in the Javakheti region.
