= FC Samtskhe =

FC Samtskhe Akhaltsikhe
- Founded: 2019; 7 years ago
- Ground: Mikheil Iadze Stadium, Akhaltsikhe, Georgia
- Manager: Davit Merabishvili
- Coach: Vladimer Vashadze
- League: Liga 4
- 2025: 1st of 14, Regionuli Liga B

FC Samtskhe (Georgian: საფეხბურთო კლუბი სამცხე) is a Georgian association football club based in Akhaltsikhe. Following the 2025 season, they were promoted to Liga 4, the fourth tier of Georgian football.

The club is governed by the local municipality.

== History ==
Samtskhe was established in 2019 on the basis of Akhaltsikhe Sport School. The next year they joined Regionuli Liga as the second team of the city along with Meskheti.

Due to COVID and relevant restrictions related to it the season consisted of 13 games only. The debutants prevailed in their very first game over Tori and overall performed well enough not only to retain their place in the league, but also to finish in the top five, four points short of the promotion spot.

In March 2021, the team eliminated Liga 4 side Sulori from the national cup. In the regular season the start was dodgy with the initial 15 winless games, although the club significantly improved in the autumn.

In 2024, Samtskhe seemed poised for another promotion attempt. Amid a tight competition with two other rivals, the team finished behind group leaders Iveria, sharing the second place with Aragvi-2 but due to disadvantage in goal difference they failed to reach the playoffs.

The club was faced with unfavorable conditions a year later, unable to host their rivals at home and forced to play in Kaspi, located 160 km away from Akhaltsikhe. However, by half season of 2025, Samtskhe turned out the only team across five national divisions who won every single official game. Apart from knocking out three opponents, including two Liga 3 sides, from the 2025 Georgian Cup, the team went on a rampage against their league rivals in blistering goalscoring form (+53). Samtskhe continued their flawless winning run in the second half as well, gaining automatic promotion to Liga 4.

A year later, the team successfully completed its league campaign to secure a second consecutive promotion despite still being deprived of the ability to play at home ground.

== Seasons ==
Year	League	M	W	D	L	GF–GA	Pts	Pos
2020	Regionuli Liga, East A	13	7	2	4	21–20	23	5th of 14
2021	Regionuli Liga, East A	23	6	4	13	35–42	22	19th of 24
2022	Regionuli Liga, East A	26	8	4	14	40–54	28	11th of 14
2023	Regionuli Liga, East B	20	11	3	6	48–30	36	5th of 11
2024	Regionuli Liga, East B	24	18	3	3	76–21	57	3rd of 13
2025	Regionuli Liga, East B	26	26	0	0	116–11	78	1st of 14

== Stadium ==
The multi-functional central stadium is named after Mikheil Iadze, the local self-taught artist of XX century. In July 2015, the authorities announced that the arena was no longer suitable for matches and needed a thorough reconstruction, although as of the summer of 2025 work has not yet started.

== Players ==
As of 17 April 2025

Note: Flags indicate national team as defined under FIFA eligibility rules; some limited exceptions apply. Players may hold more than one non-FIFA nationality.

No.	Pos.	Nation	Player
1	GK	GEO	Tengiz Tabatadze
2	DF	GEO	Beka Kvinikadze
3	DF	GEO	Badri Tavadze (Captain)
4	DF	GEO	Tornike Kiknadze
7	MF	GEO	Vazha Nemsadze
8	MF	GEO	Giorgi Macharashvili
11	FW	GEO	Giorgi Bagishvili
12	GK	GEO	Aleksandre Gobedashvili
16	MF	GEO	Luka Lomidze

No.	Pos.	Nation	Player
18	FW	GEO	Luka Japaridze
19	DF	GEO	Zura Sosiashvili
21	MF	GEO	Teimuraz Markozashvili
22	DF	GEO	Roman Avetysian
24	DF	GEO	Tornike Chkhaidze
25	FW	GEO	Rati Burdiladze
27	MF	GEO	Nika Osepashvili
29	DF	GEO	Luka Sulkhanishvili
33	FW	GEO	Dachi Tsulaia
—	MF	GEO	Davit Chigoevi

== Honours ==
Regionuli Liga

- Winners: 2025 (Group B)

== Name ==
Samtskhe is a synonym of Meskheti and represents the western part of Samtskhe-Javakheti.
