= FC Zana Abasha =

- Ground: Mevlud Miminoshvili stadioni, Abasha, Georgia
- Capacity: 1,000
- Chairman: Vakhtang Gabelaia
- Head Coach: Mamuka Kiziria
- League: Regionuli Liga
- 2025: 15th of 16, Liga 4 (relegated)

FC Zana (Georgian: საფეხბურთო კლუბი ზანა) is a Georgian municipal football club based in the town of Abasha. Following the 2025 season, they were relegated to the fifth tier of Georgian football.

== History ==
The third tier is the highest division where Zana have taken part since the formation of independent Georgian championship in 1990. The team gained promotion to Meore Liga in 2015, although their tenure there lasted two seasons. Following their relegation in 2016, Zana spent seven seasons in Regionuli Liga.

Zana came 3rd in their group tournament three times in four years, including in 2022, when the team was chasing promotion up until the last match. However, having lost a crucial game, they failed to overcome their two rivals and qualify for playoffs.

This season the club turned out to be the only fifth-division side to have prevailed over four opponents in the cup campaign and progressed into the round of 16 for the first time in their history.

The next year Zana finished 2nd in the western zone of the regional league tournament, which implied securing a play-off qualifying spot. Following a 2–1 win over UG 35, the club earned promotion to the 4th league for 2024.

The team is also a regular participant of the annual Western Cup competition, organized by the regional Football Federation of Imereti. Zana won this tournament in 2020.

== Seasons ==
Year	Division	Pos	M	W	D	L	GF–GA	Pts	Cup
2015–16	Meore Liga, West	10th of 14	26	8	2	16	28–64	26	
2016	Meore Liga, West C	5th of 7↓	12	2	3	7	24–29	9	
2017	Regionuli Liga, West A	8th of 15	28	11	4	13	49–57	37	Round 2
2018	Regionuli Liga, West B	5th of 8	14	5	4	5	20–25	19	Round 1
2019	Regionuli Liga, West A	3rd of 19	10	7	1	2	25–9	22	
2019	Promotion Group	4th of 10	18	9	0	9	26–28	27	
2020	Regionuli Liga, West	3rd of 9	16	8	4	4	23–14	28	
2021	Regionuli Liga, West	4th of 9	24	13	3	8	49–35	42	Round 1
2022	Regionuli Liga, C	3rd of 11	20	15	1	4	64–16	46	Round 4
2023	Regionuli Liga, C	2nd of 13↑	24	19	4	1	101–16	61	Preliminary round
2024	Liga 4	7th of 15	28	13	1	14	51–59	40	Preliminary round
2025	Liga 4	15th of 16↓	30	5	8	17	48–76	23	First round

== Squad ==
As of 4 September 2024

Note: Flags indicate national team as defined under FIFA eligibility rules; some limited exceptions apply. Players may hold more than one non-FIFA nationality.

No.	Pos.	Nation	Player
1	GK	GEO	Otar Sturua
2	DF	GEO	Yuri Akhalaia
3	DF	GEO	Giorgi Lomidze
4	DF	GEO	Nugzar Khoshtaria
5	DF	GEO	Levan Tolordava
6	DF	GEO	Davit Jojua
7	MF	GEO	Giorgi Jejeia (C)
8	DF	GEO	Malkhaz Patsatsia
9	MF	GEO	Nika Ghadua
10	MF	GEO	Giorgi Shengelia

No.	Pos.	Nation	Player
11	MF	GEO	Niko Kutateladze
12	GK	GEO	Giorgi Sharukhia
13	MF	GEO	Irakli Topuria
14	MF	GEO	Dato Zakariadze
15	DF	GEO	Tengiz Jomidava
16	MF	GEO	Rati Bundiladze
17	FW	GEO	Giga Kvantaliani
19	MF	GEO	Giga Shubladze
21	MF	GEO	Tornike Meparishvili
23	MF	GEO	Igor Khelaia

== Stadium ==
Zana play their home matches at a 1,000-seater stadium named after Mevlud Miminoshvili (1942–2023). Born in Abasha, he was a FIFA referee, working in the Soviet Top League for ten seasons in the 1980s.

== Name ==
Zana is the name of a river that flows for 42 km in Abasha municipality.
