= FC Aragvelebi =

- Founded: September 28, 2018; 7 years ago
- Ground: Olympic Centre, Dusheti, Georgia
- Chairman: Maia Gagoshidze
- Head Coach: Soso Tchikaidze
- League: Liga 4
- 2025: 4th of 16, Liga 4

FC Aragvelebi (Georgian: საფეხბურთო კლუბი არაგველები) is a Georgian association football club based in Tbilisi. Currently they compete in Liga 4, the fourth tier of Georgian football.

== History ==
Aragvelebi were formed on 28 September 2018 both as a club and football academy for children. Initially, the club won the Tbilisi Elite League and started taking part in the Youth League. In 2023, the senior team under head coach Soso Tchikaidze made a debut in the Regionuli Liga tournament. Aragvelebi won 13 matches out of 22 and finished 4th in Group A with forward Alex Pirtskhalava netting 24 goals. After this season, the team unveiled an ambitious plan to progress into the 4th tier. In the winter break, they announced signing former national U21 team member and 2016 Umaglesi Liga champion Davit Jikia among other players.

In contrast with the previous year, Aragvelebi kept their title chase on track throughout the 2024 season. They dropped just eight points, scored 100 goals in 26 matches and sealed the regional league title with a game still in hand. With this achievement, the team earned automatic promotion to Liga 4.

The team performed well enough there in 2025 to fight for a promotion spot up until the last round. Furthermore, they were leading twice their immediate rivals Guria with a two-goal margin in the final game of the season, but conceded deep into the injury time to finish just below the third place.

== Seasons ==
Year	Division	Pos	M	W	D	L	GF–GA	Pts
2023	Regionuli Liga, Group A	4_{/14}	22	13	2	7	86–37	41
2024	Regionuli Liga, Group A	1_{/13}	26	23	1	2	100–15	70
2025	Liga 4	4_{/16}	30	16	6	8	75–44	54

== Squad ==
As of 25 April 2026

Note: Flags indicate national team as defined under FIFA eligibility rules; some limited exceptions apply. Players may hold more than one non-FIFA nationality.

No.	Pos.	Nation	Player
1	GK	GEO	Gogi Kulua
4	DF	GEO	Giorgi Paksashvili
5	DF	GEO	Giga Maisuradze
7	MF	GEO	Giorgi Tchvritidze
8	MF	GEO	Gigi Gogua
9	FW	GEO	Nikoloz Khintibidze
10	MF	GEO	Erekle Bilanishvili
11	FW	GEO	Davit Tabashidze
13	DF	GEO	Giorgi Chikvaidze
14	MF	GEO	Gia Gabatashvili
16	MF	GEO	Konstantine Tsikalanov

No.	Pos.	Nation	Player
17	FW	GEO	Giorgi Kakhniashvili
18	MF	GEO	Demetre Gabisonia (C)
19	DF	GEO	Giorgi Gvasalia
20	FW	GEO	Giorgi Gogenia
21	MF	GEO	Nodar Iobashvili
22	DF	GEO	Nikoloz Ksovreli
24	FW	GEO	Levan Turiashvili
25	GK	GEO	Nika Gamakharia
31	GK	GEO	Aleksandre Jinikashvili
37	DF	GEO	Giorgi Shubitidze

== Stadium ==
The club uses Dusheti's central stadium as their home ground.

== Name ==
Aragvelebi literally means Aragvians and stems from a river that runs along the Georgian Military Road. The Aragvians who fell in the Battle of Krtsanisi in the late 18th century are admired in Georgia as martyrs.

== Honours ==
Regionuli Liga: 2024 (A Group)
