= FC Mertskhali =

Football Club Mertskhali Ozurgeti
- Founded: 1936
- Ground: Central stadium Ozurgeti, Georgia
- Capacity: 3,500
- Manager: Davit Surguladze
- League: Liga 4
- 2025: 11th of 15, Liga 4
Home colours	Away colours

FC Mertskhali (Georgian: საფეხბურთო კლუბი მერცხალი; English: Swallows) is a professional football club based in Ozurgeti, the administrative center of Guria. The team competes in Liga 4, the fourth tier of Georgian football.

Mertskhali have spent four seasons in Umaglesi Liga, the top Georgian division.

== History ==
=== Early period ===
Founded in 1936, the team finished 2nd in Division 2 in 1938 and advanced to the main league of the Soviet Georgian championship.

In 1958, they claimed their first bronze medals. In the next two years Mertskhali twice clinched the Republican Cup. Also, in 1964 and 1966 the club again came third, and in 1967 became a winner of the league, which paved the way for their participation in the Soviet championship.

Mertskhali played there for seven consecutive seasons and later, in the 1980s, spent five more years in the third tier of the Soviet league system. Twice they came close to the promotion to the First League, including through a promotion play-off spot secured in 1985.

The period between 1982 and 1987, when the team under long-time manager Bakhva Giorgadze secured five medals, is considered most remarkable in the club's history.

=== Since 1990 ===
After Georgia restored its independence, the club played in Umaglesi Liga during the first three seasons after 1990 and also in 2003–04. Between 2007 and 2009 Mertskhali participated in the third tier, followed by nine successive seasons in Pirveli Liga. Most noteworthy among them was the 2011–12 season when they finished 2nd and booked a place in promotion play-offs.

For the next three years the club was mainly in mid-table, although dismal performance in the 2015–16 season resulted in relegation to Meore Liga. Prior to the new season drastic changes were made, including appointment of well-known coach Khariton Chkhatarashvili as a manager. He guided the team to the second place, but according to regulations introduced for this transitional season, only group winners could stay up. For this reason Mertskhali dropped down further to the fourth division, thus suffering two consecutive relegations within two years. It worsened the financial situation as well. The club was proposed for sale in early 2019, although unsuccessfully.

Mertskhali's tenure in the regional league lasted seven years before the club won 21 out of 24 matches, finished their league campaign on top of the table and advanced to Liga 4 in 2023.

== Seasons ==
Year	League	Pos	M	W	D	L	GF–GA	Pts	Domestic Cup
2009/10	Pirveli Liga	9_{/15}	28	9	4	15	29–45	31	2nd round
2010/11	Pirveli Liga	13_{/17}	32	8	8	16	41–68	32	1st round
2011/12	Pirveli Liga A	2_{/10}	18	12	2	4	24–17	38	1st round
2012/13	Pirveli Liga B	8_{/12}	30	5	10	15	37–52	25	1st round
2013/14	Pirveli Liga A	9_{/13}	24	7	2	15	29–54	23	1st round
2014/15	Pirveli Liga B	5_{/10}	36	13	9	14	45–68	48	1st round
2015/16	Pirveli Liga	18_{/18}↓	34	6	8	20	42–77	26	1st round
2016	Meore Liga Group B	2_{/8}↓	14	10	2	2	29-15	32	–
2017	Regionuli Liga West A	13_{/15}	28	8	4	16	48–66	28	2nd round
2018	Regionuli Liga West C	6_{/8}	14	3	5	6	16–21	14	–
2019	Regionuli Liga West	8_{/11}	10	4	0	6	16–22	12	1st round
2020	Regionuli Liga West	6_{/6}	10	1	0	9	11–37	3	–
2021	Regionuli Liga West	7_{/9}	24	6	1	17	30–60	19	–
2022	Regionuli Liga Group C	8_{/11}	20	8	5	7	33–45	29	1st round
2023	Regionuli Liga Group C	1_{/13}↑	24	21	2	1	109–19	65	–
2024	Liga 4	11_{/15}	28	11	4	13	57–64	37	1st round
2025	Liga 4	11_{/16}	30	10	9	11	61–67	39	1st round
2026	Liga 4								2nd round

== Squad ==
As of 25 April 2026

Note: Flags indicate national team as defined under FIFA eligibility rules; some limited exceptions apply. Players may hold more than one non-FIFA nationality.

No.	Pos.	Nation	Player
1	GK	GEO	Tazo Gelkhviidze
2	DF	GEO	Nodar Surguladze
3	DF	GEO	Roman Morchiladze
5	DF	GEO	Kakha Mujiri
7	MF	GEO	Giorgi Chanukvadze (C)
8	MF	GEO	Erekle Malazonia
9	FW	GEO	Tengiz Alievi
10	MF	GEO	Giorgi Kashia
11	FW	GEO	Davit Bolkvadze
12	GK	GEO	Luka Lomidze

No.	Pos.	Nation	Player
13	MF	GEO	Ilia Tsitaishvili
14	MF	GEO	Nika Abkhazava
15	FW	GEO	Lasha Tsertsvadze
17	DF	GEO	Nodar Machavariani
18	DF	GEO	Irakli Giorgadze
20	FW	GEO	Elguja Chkhaidze
21	DF	GEO	Nikoloz Marshanishvili
22	FW	GEO	Koka Shengelia
27	MF	GEO	Giorgi Gogelia
30	MF	GEO	Lasha Kotrikadze

== Honours ==
- Pirveli Liga (Tier 2)
  - Silver Medal winner: 1993–94, 2002–03, 2011–12
  - Bronze Medal winner: 1996–97
- Soviet Second League (Tier 3)
  - Silver Medal winner: 1984
  - Bronze Medal winner: 1968, 1985
- Georgian Soviet Championship (Tier 4)
  - Champion: 1967, 1982, 1987
  - Bronze Medal winner: 1958, 1960, 1964, 1966
- Regionuli Liga (Tier 5)
  - Winner: 2023 (Group C)
- Georgian SSR Cup
  - Champion: 1959, 1960, 1982

== Notable players ==
• Omar Tetradze

• Irakli Zoidze

• Grigol Dolidze

== Stadium ==
A football ground with the capacity of 10,000 seats was built in 1968, although after the reconstruction it was later reduced to 3,500.

In May 2026, the arena, previously known as the Megobroba (literally "Friendship") stadium, was named after Kote Gogatadze (1924–1996) who spent most of his life at the club as a player, coach and high-ranking official.

== Names ==
• 1938–46 Makharadze district team

• 1946–47 Dinamo

• 1947–54 Makharadze district team

• 1954–59 Kolmeurne

• 1960 Sikharuli

• 1961–93 Mertskhali

• 1993–95 Anako

Note: Makharadze was the Soviet-time name for Ozurgeti.
