= FC Iberia 2010 =

- Founded: August 9, 2010; 15 years ago
- Ground: Olympic stadium, Tbilisi
- Capacity: 2,000
- Owner: Gubaz Dolidze
- Head Coach: Giorgi Tsiskadze
- League: Liga 3
- 2025: 1st of 16, Liga 4 (promoted)

FC Iberia 2010 (Georgian: საფეხბურთო კლუბი იბერია 2010) is a Georgian association football club based in Tbilisi. Following the 2025 season, they were promoted to Liga 3, the third tier of Georgian football.

== History ==
Iberia 2010 was formed on 9 August 2010 by coach Gubaz Dolidze who has since been their manager.

The team spent several years in Meore Liga up until 2016, when they came 5th which implied automatic relegation to the regional league.

Each time during the next eight years Iberia 2010 finished in top half of the Regionuli Liga table, twice coming close to the 1st place. For instance, they missed out on title by two points only in 2018.

In 2024, Iberia 2010 achieved their first ever promotion to a higher league. First, they came as runners-up in Group B and secured a play-off place. Following a narrow win over Aragvi-2 in semifinals, they beat Egrisi 4–1 in a final game of the tournament and advanced to Liga 4.

The next year, the team managed to continue their winning streak. They topped the table for most of the season and as champions achieved a back-to-back promotion with three games still to play.

== Seasons ==
Year	Division	Pos	M	W	D	L	GF–GA	Pts
2012–13	Meore Liga, Group East	10_{/14}	26	8	4	14	47–71	36
2013–14	Meore Liga, Group East	14_{/16}	30	6	3	21	45–96	21
2014–15	Meore Liga, Group East	4_{/15}	28	14	5	9	58–56	47
2015–16	Meore Liga, Group Center	13_{/15}	28	3	3	21	39–114	12
2016	Meore Liga, Group East B	5_{/9}↓	14	3	4	7	25–31	13
2017	Regionuli Liga							
2018	Regionuli Liga, Group B	3_{/11}	20	15	1	4	63–24	46
2019	Regionuli Liga, Group A	2_{/9}	10	8	2	0	27–4	26
2019	Regionuli Liga							
2020	Regionuli Liga, Group B	3_{/14}	13	8	2	3	42–27	26
2021	Regionuli Liga, Group A	9_{/24}	23	11	5	7	37–39	38
2022	Regionuli Liga, Group A	6_{/14}	26	12	3	11	59–52	39
2023	Regionuli Liga, Group B	3_{/11}	20	12	3	5	63–32	41
2024	Regionuli Liga, Group A	2_{/14}↑	26	22	0	4	88–36	66
2025	Liga 4	1_{/16}↑	30	20	3	7	86–45	63

== Players ==
As of 3 April 2025

Note: Flags indicate national team as defined under FIFA eligibility rules; some limited exceptions apply. Players may hold more than one non-FIFA nationality.

No.	Pos.	Nation	Player
3	DF	GEO	Kartlos Serdumalishvili
4	DF	GEO	Giorgi Burjaliani
5	DF	GEO	Nika Gabelia (C)
6	DF	GEO	Nika Gvagvalia
7	MF	GEO	Soso Gikashvili
8	MF	GEO	Nikoloz Lukava
10	MF	GEO	Luka Minjia
11	FW	GEO	Luka Aslanishvili

No.	Pos.	Nation	Player
15	DF	GEO	Temur Kuparashvili
18	MF	GEO	Albert Karumashvili
24	GK	GEO	Davit Khurtsidze
25	MF	GEO	Ioseb Turashvili
31	MF	GEO	Sandro Vepkhvadze
34	GK	GEO	Guga Chanturia
50	MF	GEO	Davit Stepnadze
59	FW	GEO	Nodar Dzneladze

== Honours ==
- Regionuli Liga
  - Runners-up: 2024 (Group B)
- Liga 4
  - Champions: 2025

== Notable players ==
Below are some of the national team or U21 players who spent a part of their youth career at Iberia 2010:

- Giorgi Papunashvili
- Giorgi Gagua
- Giorgi Beridze
- Giorgi Aburjania
