= FC Matchakhela =

FC Machakhela
- Full name: FC Machakhela Khelvachauri
- Founded: 15 June 2011; 15 years ago
- Ground: Central stadium, Khelvachauri
- Capacity: 1,000
- Owner: Khelvachauri Municipality City Hall
- Chairman: Simon Zakaradze
- Manager: Badri Tsiskaradze
- League: Regionuli Liga
- 2025: 16th of 16 in Liga 4

FC Machakhela (Georgian: საფეხბურთო კლუბი მაჭახელა), also spelled as Matchakhela, is a Georgian football club based in the town of Khelvachauri, Adjara. Following the 2025 season, they were relegated to Regionuli Liga, the fifth tier of Georgian football.

== History ==
Machakhela were founded оn the basis of Khelvachauri's Sport School on 15 June 2011. After the first season under manager Nugzar Kokoladze, the team mostly consisting of local amateur footballers took 4th place in Meore Liga. The next head coach, Amiran Gogitidze, guided the club to the top of the league, which they won with automatic promotion in 2013.

On 28 February 2014, the sport school club changed its status into Football Club Machakhela Ltd.

During most of the 2013–14 season, Machakhela were engaged in inter-Adjarian rivalry with Dinamo Batumi for a second promotion place to Umaglesi Liga, in which eventually the latter prevailed. Overall, the 3rd place taken in 2014 in Liga 2 has been the club's highest point reached in Georgian leagues.

The team finished the 2014–15 season comfortably in mid-table, but a year later entered a period of instability. Struggling the whole season, they eventually lost a battle for survival.

The 2016 season was transitional in all Georgian football leagues into Spring-Autumn system with a sharp reduction of clubs in each division. Machakhela failed to remain in the third tier and thus suffered double relegation in successive seasons. Although they managed to climb back to Liga 3 the next year, in 2018 the team finished bottom of the league.

Machakhela spent two seasons in Regionuli Liga before they won promotion to recently formed Liga 4 for 2021. After two more years, they successfully concluded their league campaign under Avtandil Kunchulia and moved back into the third tier. In 2023, the team ended up in the drop zone, but due to the demotion of another club to Liga 4, Matchakhela managed to retain their place in the third division.

Following the next two seasons, the club once again changed divisions after suffering back-to-back relegations.

== Seasons ==
Season	League	Pos	MP	W	D	L	GF–GA	Pts
2012–13	Meore Liga West	1st of 13↑	24	20	2	2	74-11	62
2013–14	Pirveli Liga Group B	3rd of 14	26	16	6	4	44-21	54
2014–15	Pirveli Liga Group A	6th of 10	36	14	3	19	48-66	45
2015–16	Pirveli Liga	16th of 18↓	34	8	13	13	30-43	37
2016	Liga 3 Group B	5th of 8↓	14	7	1	6	25-23	22
2017	Regionuli Liga West A	2nd of 15↑	28	9	5	4	63-23	62
2018	Liga 3	20th of 20↓	38	5	13	20	35-63	28
2019	Regionuli Liga West	8th of 10	18	6	2	10	30-40	20
2020	Regionuli Liga West B	2nd of 6↑	10	8	0	2	28-16	24
2021	Liga 4 White Group	7th of 10	18	6	1	11	35-41	19
2021	Relegation Round	5th of 10	18	9	3	6	45-24	30
2022	Liga 4	3rd of 16↑	30	20	4	6	60-26	64
2023	Liga 3	14th of 16	30	8	2	20	38-81	26
2024	Liga 3	15th of 16↓	30	6	6	19	30-86	24
2025	Liga 4	16th of 16↓	30	0	1	29	8-168	1

== Squad ==
As of 16 April 2026

Note: Flags indicate national team as defined under FIFA eligibility rules; some limited exceptions apply. Players may hold more than one non-FIFA nationality.

No.	Pos.	Nation	Player
1	GK	GEO	Giorgi Kakaladze
2	DF	GEO	Saba Kupradze
3	DF	GEO	Enrike Kartsivadze
4	DF	GEO	Giorgi Dzirkvadze
6	DF	GEO	Rezo Jijavadze
7	MF	GEO	Nika Gorgadze
8	MF	GEO	Giorgi Gvianidze
9	MF	GEO	Aleksandre Kokoladze (C)
10	FW	GEO	Temur Tsintadze

No.	Pos.	Nation	Player
11	FW	GEO	Lasha Akhalaia
12	GK	GEO	Nikoloz Tsiklauri
14	MF	GEO	Giorgi Shainidze
15	FW	GEO	Nika Nozadze
16	DF	GEO	Bachi Tsetskhladze
19	MF	GEO	Luka Katamadze
20	DF	GEO	Giorgi Chelidze
21	FW	GEO	Luka Koridze

== Honours ==
• Pirveli Liga (level 2)

Third place (1): 2013–14, Group B

• Meore Liga (level 3)

Winners (1): 2012–13

• Liga 4 (level 4)

Third place (1): 2022

• Regionuli Liga (level 5)*

Runners-up (2): 2017, 2020 (West)

Note: Regionuli Liga was fourth tier up until 2018

== Stadium ==
Machakhela play their home matches at Akhalsopeli Central stadium, which has the capacity of 1,000 seats.

== Name ==
The name derives from Machakheli, a geographical area near the border between Georgia and Turkey.
