= FC Algeti Marneuli =

Georgian football club

- Founded: 1975
- Ground: Marneuli central stadium
- Capacity: 2,000
- Manager: Gocha Zhorzholiani
- League: Liga 4
- 2025: 6th of 15, Liga 4

FC Algeti (Georgian: საფეხბურთო კლუბი ალგეთი) is a Georgian municipal football club from Marneuli, competing in Liga 4, the fourth tier of Georgian football.

The club plays their home matches at the Marneuli central stadium.

The name comes from the Algeti river.

== History ==
Algeti participated in Georgian second division for years before being relegated after the 2015–16 season.

The club participated in Liga 3 for two years, but they left it following the 2018 season after ten teams in the bottom half of the table formed Liga 4.

In 2020, Algeti came third in White Group of the league, below two promotion places, and in the next two years they finished just above the drop-zone.

== Seasons ==
Year	League	Pos	MP	W	D	L	GF–GA	Pts	Notes
2016	Meore Liga East B	1st of 9	14	12	2	0	54-9	38	
2017	Liga 3 White Group	8th of 10	18	5	6	7	25-27	21	
2017	Liga 3 Relegation Group	2nd of 10	18	9	4	5	36-19	31	
2018	Liga 3	14th of 20	38	13	7	18	54-64	46	Relegated
2019	Liga 4	9th of 10	27	7	4	16	37-51	25	
2020	Liga 4 White Group	3rd of 8	14	6	2	6	25-30	20	
2021	Liga 4 Red Group	6th of 10	18	6	9	3	40-23	27	
2021	Relegation Round	6th of 10	18	9	3	6	47-28	30	
2022	Liga 4	12th of 16	30	11	3	16	42-60	36	
2023	Liga 4	6th of 14	26	10	4	12	48-74	34	
2024	Liga 4	10th of 15	28	12	3	13	38-52	39	
2025	Liga 4	6th of 16	30	15	7	8	70-40	52	

== Stadium ==
A 2,000-seater central stadium is Algeti's home ground. After a three-year reconstruction, it opened in June 2024. The arena has an artificial turf.
