= Liga 4 (Georgia) =

Georgian association football league

- Founded: 2019; 7 years ago
- Country: Georgia
- Confederation: UEFA
- Number of clubs: 16
- Level on pyramid: 4
- Promotion to: Liga 3
- Relegation to: Regionuli Liga
- Domestic cup: Georgian Cup
- Current champions: Iberia 2010 (2025)
- Website: liga.gff.ge

Liga 4 (Georgian: ლიგა 4), organized by the Georgian Football Federation, is the fourth tier of the national football league. It was founded in 2019 as a part of comprehensive reorganization of the league system.

As of the 2026 season, Algeti hold the longest tenure in this division. They have been in Liga 4 since its inaugurating season.

There will be two former top-division teams in the 2026 season: Borjomi (2005–09) and Mertskhali (1990–92, 2003–04). Eight junior teams of higher league members are also represented in the division this year.

== Structure and format ==
In 2018, the GFF decided to form an additional division between Liga 3 and Regionuli Liga by introducing Liga 4 for the 2019 season. After the first year the top two clubs were promoted to Liga 3 and the bottom two were supposed to be relegated to Regional league. However, in February 2020 the league regulation sustained new changes, which saved the doomed teams from relegation and enlarged the tournament with four more Regionuli Liga clubs.

In January 2021, the Federation announced that the number of clubs participating in the upcoming season would be increased to twenty, although for the next year they were reduced back to sixteen.

Since the 2022 season, the top three teams earn automatic promotion to Liga 3 and the bottom four clubs are relegated to Regionuli Liga. The league underwent one change in 2023: with fourteen clubs competing this season, the drop zone was reduced to two places.

The number of teams in each season:

• 2019 = 10

• 2020, 2022, 2025, 2026 = 16

• 2021 = 20

• 2023 = 14

• 2024 = 15

Each club play each of the other clubs twice (once at home and once away) and obtain three points for a win, one for a draw and no points for a loss. From these points a league table is constructed.

At the end of the season the top three teams gain promotion to Liga 3. Similarly, the three teams that finish at the bottom are relegated to Regionuli Liga. A team can be spared relegation if another team either resigns or is expelled from the league.

Final league position is determined, in order, by points obtained, head-to-head points, head-to-head goal difference, head-to-head goals scored, head-to-head away goals scored (only if two teams), goal difference and goals scored.

Since Liga 4 is the bottom national tier, this is where the Federation may expel a team from higher divisions. Shukura is the latest club demoted in January 2024.

It is the only national division where no play-offs are held.

== Current members ==
Location of Liga 4 football clubs in 2026

Sixteen teams are competing in the league in 2026, half of them being the reserve teams of higher league members.

The clubs are listed below in alphabetical order.

Club	Position last season	Location	Region	Venue
Algeti	6th	Marneuli	Kvemo Kartli	Central stadium
Aragvelebi	4th	Tbilisi	Tbilisi	Olympic Center, Dusheti
Aragvi-2	1st in Reg.Liga A	Tbilisi	Tbilisi	Marakana
Bakhmaro	16th in Liga 3	Chokhatauri	Guria	Boris Paichadze stadium
Borjomi	15th in Liga 3	Borjomi	Samtskhe	Grigol Jomartidze Stadium, Khashuri
Gagra-2	10th	Tbilisi	Tbilisi	Central stadium, Mukhrani
Kolkheti-2	8th	Poti	Samegrelo	Fazisi Stadium
Locomotive-2	13th in Liga 3	Tbilisi	Tbilisi	Olympic Complex
Merani-2	7th	Martvili	Samegrelo	Murtaz Khurtsilava stadium
Mertskhali	11th	Ozurgeti	Guria	Megobroba stadium
Samgurali-2	12th	Tskaltubo	Imereti	26 May stadium
Samtskhe	1st in Reg.Liga B	Akhaltsikhe	Samtskhe	Shatili Arena, Tbilisi
Skuri	5th	Tsalenjikha	Samegrelo	Sasha Kvaratskhelia stadium
Torpedo-2	Regionuli Liga PO winner	Kutaisi	Imereti	Nikea Football Centre
West Georgia	1st in Reg.Liga C	Batumi	Adjara	Chele Arena, Kobuleti
WIT Georgia-2	9th	Tbilisi	Tbilisi	Mtskheta Park, Mtskheta

== Seasons ==
=== Previous years ===
In the first season, ten teams played 27 games each. Eventually, two clubs from Tbilisi finished in top places awarding them promotion to the upper league.

The 2020 season was scheduled to start in April, but COVID-19 postponed it for four months. In July, the Georgian Football Federation decided to form White and Red Groups with winners getting automatic promotion and bottom two clubs going down. 16 teams were split into two groups. The football season started in August and lasted five months with each team playing 14 games only. Two winners and two runners-up were promoted to Liga 3.

The next year, Promotion and Relegation Groups were created after the first phase. In the end, the first four teams of the former advanced to Liga 3, while the bottom four of the latter dropped down a further level to Regionuli Liga.

In contrast, starting from 2022 the seasons have been held as a single two-round tournament.

=== Promoted teams ===
2019	**Spaeri** • Tbilisi City
2020	**Varketili** • **Didube** • Merani-2 Tbilisi • Magaroeli
2021	**Dinamo-2 Tbilisi** • Zestaponi • Borjomi • Irao
2022	**Locomotive-2** • Shturmi • Matchakhela
2023	**Gonio** • Betlemi • Gardabani
2024	**Didube** • Margveti 2006 • Odishi 1919
2025	**Iberia 2010** • Iveria • Guria

Note: Teams indicated in bold are champions.

=== Relegated teams ===
2019	N/A
2020	N/A
2021	Torpedo-2 • Tbilisi • Imereti • Egrisi
2022	Didube • Samegrelo • Magaroeli • Iberia
2023	Kolkheti-2 1913 • Dinamo Zugdidi
2024	Varketili-2 • Merani-2 Tbilisi • Chikhura
2025	Zestaponi • Sulori • Zana • Matchakhela

=== Participation per club ===
Taking into account the 2026 season, 46 teams have been members of this league for at least one year.

Team	Par.
Algeti	8
Skuri	7
WIT Georgia-2	7
Merani-2 Martvili	6
Odishi 1919	6
Sulori	6
Samgurali-2	5
Betlemi	4
Margveti 2006	4
Matchakhela	4
Samegrelo	4
Borjomi	4
Didube	3
Egrisi	3
Gagra-2	3

Team	Par.
Iberia	3
Imereti	3
Kolkheti-2 1913	3
Locomotive-2	2
Magaroeli	3
Mertskhali	3
Zestaponi	3
Aragvelebi	2
Merani-2 Tbilisi	2
Shturmi	2
Torpedo-2	2
Tbilisi 2025	2
Tbilisi 2025 B	2
Zana	2
Aragvi-2	1

Team	Par.
Bakhmaro	1
Chikhura	1
Dinamo Tbilisi-2	1
Dinamo Zugdidi	1
Gardabani	1
Gareji	1
Gonio	1
Guria	1
Iberia 2010	1
Iveria	1
Orbi	1
Samtskhe	1
Spaeri	1
Tbilisi	1
Tbilisi City	1
West Georgia	1

Their current status as of 2026:

Erovnuli Liga	1
Erovnuli Liga 2	3
Liga 3	11
Liga 4	16
Regionuli Liga	9
Defunct	6
