= FC Merani Tbilisi =

Merani
- Full name: FC Merani Tbilisi
- Founded: 1991
- Dissolved: 2009
- Ground: Sinatle Stadium; Tbilisi, Georgia
- Capacity: 2,500
- League: N/A
| Home colours | Away colours |

FC Merani Tbilisi was a Georgian football club based in Tbilisi. They played in the 1990s and 2000s before being disbanded in 2009. Their home ground was Sinatle Stadium.

The club was named after a hotel in Tbilisi. The club colours were all-red for home matches, and all-white for away.

== History ==
Merani Tbilisi was merged with Bacho Tbilisi in July 1993 and formed Merani-Bacho Tbilisi.

The club second team Merani-91 Tbilisi, became the first team.

In 2002, Merani-91 Tbilisi merged again, this time to FC Olimpi Tbilisi, owned by Nikoloz Dolidze and formed Merani-Olimpi Tbilisi. Which FC Tbilisi take the 2002–03 seat.

Merani restarted in Regionuli Liga by changed the reserve team to first team.

In July 2004, newly formed Merani Tbilisi was merged with Milani Tsnori and formed Merani-Milani Tbilisi, which renamed to Merani Tbilisi in July 2005.

=== Seasons ===
- 1991: Merani Tbilisi Regionuli Liga
- 1991–92: Merani Tbilisi Pirveli Liga
- 1992–93: Merani Tbilisi Pirveli Liga
- 1993–94: Merani-Bacho Tbilisi Pirveli Liga
- 1994–95: Merani-Bacho Tbilisi Pirveli Liga
- 2003–04: Merani Tbilisi Regionuli Liga
- 2004–05: Merani-Milani Tbilisi Pirveli Liga
- 2005–06: Merani Tbilisi Pirveli Liga Runner-up
- 2006–07: Merani Tbilisi Umaghlesi Liga
- 2007–08: Merani Tbilisi Umaghlesi Liga 15th, Relegated
- 2008–09: Merani Tbilisi Meore Liga

=== Merani-91 ===
- 1993–94: Merani-91 Tbilisi Pirveli Liga
- 1994–95: Merani-91 Tbilisi Pirveli Liga
- 1995–96: Merani-91 Tbilisi Pirveli Liga
- 1996–97: Merani-91 Tbilisi Umaghlesi Liga
- 1997–98: Merani-91 Tbilisi Umaghlesi Liga
- 1998–99: Merani-91 Tbilisi Umaghlesi Liga
- 1999-00: Merani-91 Tbilisi Umaghlesi Liga
- 2000–01: Merani-91 Tbilisi Umaghlesi Liga
- 2001–02: Merani-91 Tbilisi Umaghlesi Liga (Second team in Pirveli Liga)
- 2002–03: Merani-Olimpi Tbilisi Umaghlesi Liga

== Honours ==
- Pirveli Liga
  - Champion: 1996
  - Silver Medal winner: 1995, 2006

== Notable players ==
- Teymuraz Mchedlishvili

== Eurocups record ==
| Season | Competition | Round | Country | Club | Home | Away |
|---|---|---|---|---|---|---|
| 1997 | UEFA Intertoto Cup | Group 12 | (Russia) | Torpedo Moscow | 0–2 | |
| 1997 | UEFA Intertoto Cup | Group 12 | (Greece) | Iraklis Thessaloniki | | 0–2 |
| 1997 | UEFA Intertoto Cup | Group 12 | (Malta) | Floriana F.C. | 5–0 | |
| 1997 | UEFA Intertoto Cup | Group 12 | (Austria) | S.V. Ried | | 3–1 |

== Coaches ==
- 2002: Otar Gabelia
- 2003: Koba Zhorzhikashvili
- 2003: Nikoloz Dolidze
- 2003: Temur Lortkipanidze
- 2003: Joni Janelidze
