= FC Sulori Vani =

- Full name: FC Sulori Vani
- Founded: 1956; 70 years ago
- Ground: Grigol Nikoleishvili Stadium; Vani
- Capacity: 2,500
- Chairman: Roin Kankadze
- Manager: Giga Nikoleishvili
- League: Regionuli Liga
- 2025: 14th of 16 Liga 4 (relegated)
Home colours	Away colours

FC Sulori (Georgian: საფეხბურთო კლუბი სულორი) is a Georgian football club based in the town of Vani. Following the 2025 season, they were relegated to Regionuli Liga, the fifth tier of Georgian football.

The team has spent two seasons in the top flight.

They play their home matches at the Grigol Nikoleishvili Stadium.

== History ==
Sulori became champions of the Georgian Soviet league in 1969. This success enabled the club to participate in the Soviet Second Minor league the next year, which they finished in the 10th place among 18 teams.

By claiming seven titles within nine years, Sulori became one of the leading members of the republican league in the 1980s. In the same period twice in a row they clinched the Georgian Cup as well.

When the national championship was formed, the team won the second division in 1990 and gained promotion to the first tier. However, after two seasons they were relegated. The only attempt to return to the Umaglesi Liga via play-offs was unsuccessful in 1999, as Sulori lost a decisive match to Kolkheti Khobi.

In 2016, the team knocked out three opponents, including two top-tier teams, and reached the cup quarterfinals, where they were beaten with a narrow margin by Torpedo Kutaisi, the future cup winners of the season.

The team had an unusual achievement in the victorious 2015–16 season when they recorded an unbeaten run in the 3rd division. The club moved back to Pirveli Liga, although their tenure there lasted one season only. Following another relegation two years later, Sulori reached their lowest point in 2019, when they competed in the regional league.

Sulori spent the next six seasons in Liga 4 before suffering another drop to Regionuli Liga.

== Players ==
As of 4 November 2024

Note: Flags indicate national team as defined under FIFA eligibility rules; some limited exceptions apply. Players may hold more than one non-FIFA nationality.

No.	Pos.	Nation	Player
5	DF	GEO	Romeo Chakhunashvili (C)
6	DF	GEO	Giorgi Oniani
7	FW	GEO	Davit Gabunia
8	MF	GEO	Nugzar Kopaliani
9	FW	GEO	Saba Kuprashvli
10	MF	GEO	Lasha Chavchidze
11	MF	GEO	Tornike Kokiashvili
12	DF	GEO	Toma Magularia
13	MF	GEO	Tazo Khurtsidze

No.	Pos.	Nation	Player
15	DF	GEO	Amiran Khujadze
17	MF	GEO	Giorgi Kimutsadze
19	MF	GEO	Luka Chavchidze
20	DF	GEO	Saba Beltadze
22	DF	GEO	Luka Khavtasi
24	GK	GEO	Tamaz Gelkhviidze
30	GK	GEO	Vaso Iosebashvili
33	MF	GEO	Dushiko Trapaidze
—	DF	GEO	Tornike Giorgidze

== Seasons ==
Season	League	Pos.	Pl.	W	D	L	GF	GA	P	Notes
2011–12	Pirveli Liga West	9th of 10	18	6	2	10	11	35	12	
2012–13	Pirveli Liga Group A	11th of 12	33	7	4	22	30	72	25	
2013–14	Pirveli Liga Group B	14th of 14	26	2	3	21	14	59	9	Relegated
2014–15	Meore Liga West	2nd of 15	28	24	3	1	87	10	75	
2015–16	Meore Liga West	1st of 14	26	23	3	0	77	14	13	Promoted
2016	Pirveli Liga Group A	5th of 9	16	7	3	6	20	21	21	Relegation round (Note: Lost 7–0 on aggregate to Merani Martvili in relegation play-off quarterfinals)
2017	Liga 3 Group B	6th of 10	18	7	3	8	20	19	24	
2017	Relegation Group	4th of 10	18	9	3	6	20	21	30	
2018	Liga 3	18th of 20	30	10	6	22	38	77	36	Relegated
2019	Regionuli Liga West	3rd of 10	9	6	1	2	28	6	19	
2019	Upper Group	1st of 10	18	15	1	2	40	13	46	Promoted
2020	Liga 4 White Group	8th of 8	14	2	4	8	10	20	10	
2021	Liga 4 Red Group	5th of 10	18	8	5	5	31	15	29	
2021	Promotion Group	7th of 10	18	7	2	9	21	27	23	
2022	Liga 4	7th of 16	30	12	5	13	35	40	41	
2023	Liga 4	9th of 14	26	9	5	12	26	39	32	
2024	Liga 4	5th of 15	28	13	4	11	53	49	43	
2025	Liga 4	14th of 16	30	7	6	17	36	63	27	

== Honours ==
- Georgian Soviet Championship
  - Champion: 1969
  - Silver Medal Winner: 1980, 1983, 1984, 1988
  - Bronze Medal Winner: 1982
- Georgian Soviet Cup
  - Winner: 1980, 1981
- Pirveli Liga
  - Champion: 1990
  - Bronze Medal Winner: 1999
- Meore Liga
  - Winner: 2015–16 (Group A)
  - Runners-up: 2014–15
- Regionuli Liga
  - Winner: 2019 (West)

== Name ==
Sulori is a balneological resort, situated in 11 km from the town of Vani.
