= Regionuli Liga =

- Founded: 1990; 36 years ago
- Country: Georgia
- Confederation: UEFA
- Number of clubs: 43
- Level on pyramid: 5
- Promotion to: Liga 4
- Domestic cup: Georgian Cup
- Website: gff.ge

Regionuli Liga (Georgian: რეგიონული ლიგა), run by Georgian Football Federation since 1990, is the fifth and lowest division of the Georgian football league system after Erovnuli Liga, Erovnuli Liga 2, Liga 3 and Liga 4. Its participants are both professional clubs and reserve teams of higher league members.

Prior to the introduction of Liga 4 in 2019, Regionuli Liga was the fourth tier.

== Structure ==
As the name implies, the league is based on regional principle. Depending on the number of participating clubs, it is divided into several groups. In 2017, there were forty teams allocated in three groups. The next year two zones were created for teams based in western Georgia and two more for the eastern regions. This regulation lasted three seasons until 2021, when the league was split into two groups, although the next year it switched back to three groups.

The number of promoted clubs per season also varies. Starting from 2022, the group winners gain automatic promotion, while three second-placed teams compete for the remaining promotion spot in after-season play-offs. Third-placed teams, too, directly or through have advanced to the fourth tier in recent years. In another case, play-off ties against Liga 3 teams determined the fate of the Liga 4 two slots.

The seasons are played on Spring-Autumn system.

== Current season ==
Locations of Regionuli Liga football clubs in 2026

For the 2026 season 31 club mostly from the southern and eastern parts of Georgia and three Tbilisi-based teams from Abkhazia formed A and B groups, while zone C consists of 12 clubs from the western regions. Each club plays each of the other clubs twice, once at home and once away. At the end of the season four teams will gain promotion to Liga 4. Three group winners will be joined by one of the runners-up based on play-off results among the three second-placed teams.

The clubs represented in Regionuli liga for the 2026 season are listed below in alphabetical order. Seven of them have in the past participated in the top division:

- Dinamo Sokhumi in 2005–06;
- Egrisi in 1995–96;
- Magaroeli in 1993–94 and 1997–98;
- Sapovnela in 1993–95 and 2015–16;
- Sulori in 1991–92;
- Tskhumi in 1990–93;
- Zestaponi in 2004–15.

Aragvi 1954, Avaza, Iberia 2010 B, Iveria-2, Kolkheti-2, Shukura 1960 and Ushba are making their debut in the league.

Groups	Teams
A	Avaza • Dinamo Gagra • Dinamo Sokhumi • Dmanisi • Gardabani-2 • Gareji-2 • Junker • Merani-2 • Rustavi-2 • Tbilisi 2025 B • Telavi-2 • UG 35 • Ushba • Zooveti • 35th Football School
B	Abuli • Aragvi 1954 • Gori-2 • Iberia 2010 B • Iveria-2 • Kareli • Kaspi 1936 • Liakhvi Achabeti • Magaroeli • Norchi Dinamo 2016 • Meshakhte-2 • Orbi-2 • Spaeri-2 • Tskhumi • Ukimerioni • Zestaponi
C	Dinamo Batumi-2 • Egrisi • Imereti • Jvari • Kolkheti-2 • Matchakhela • Odishi-2 • Sairme • Sapovnela • Shukura 1960 • Sulori • Zana

Notes:

- Dinamo Gagra, Dinamo Sokhumi, Liakhvi and Tskhumi are based in Tbilisi due to problems related to the territorial integrity of Georgia.

== Past seasons ==
=== Group winners ===
Western group winners are indicated first

Year	Teams
2017	Bakhmaro • Saburtalo-2 • Varketili
2018	Salkhino Martvili • Dinamo-2 Batumi • FC Tbilisi City • Gareji
2019	Torpedo-2 • Skuri • WIT Georgia-2 • Didube
2020	Torpedo-2 • Merani-2 Martvili • Irao • Dinamo-2 Tbilisi
2021	Samgurali-2 • Locomotive-2
2022	Kolkheti-2 1913 • Gardabani • Varketili-2
2023	Mertskhali • Gagra-2 • Didube 2014
2024	Kolkheti-2 1913 • Iveria • Aragvelebi
2025	West Georgia • Aragvi-2 • Samtskhe

=== Promoted teams ===
By alphabetical order

Year	Teams
2017	Aragvi • Bakhmaro • Matchakhela • Saburtalo-2 • Samgurali-2 • Varketili
2018	Egrisi • Gareji • Odishi 1919 • Spaeri • Tbilisi City
2019	Didube • Iberia • Merani-2 Tbilisi • Skuri • Sulori • WIT Georgia-2 • Zestaponi
2020	Dinamo-2 Tbilisi • Irao • Margveti 2006 • Matchakhela • Merani-2 Martvili • Shturmi • Tbilisi • Torpedo-2
2021	Locomotive-2 • Samgurali-2
2022	Gardabani • Gonio • Kolkheti-2 • Varketili-2
2023	Didube 2014 • Gagra-2 • Mertskhali • Zana
2024	Aragvelebi • Iberia 2010 • Iveria • Kolkheti-2
2025	Aragvi-2 • Samtskhe • Torpedo-2 • West Georgia

Notes: Aragvi and Samgurali-2 beat their upper league rivals in the 2017 play-offs, and Gareji a year later. All the other clubs were promoted directly. In 2018 and 2019, the second phase of competition was held in Promotion Groups. As a result, in comparison with the initial phase, the final table of these seasons sustained some changes.
