= 1990 FC Guria season =

Guria
1990 season
- Manager: Murtaz Khurtsilava; Gigla Imnadze
- Stadium: Guria stadium, Lanchkhuti
- Umaglesi Liga: 2nd of 18
- Georgian Cup: Winners
- Top goalscorer: Otar Korgalidze (21)
- Biggest win: 8–1 v Shevardeni 1906 (away, 23 August)
- Biggest defeat: 2–5 v Mertskhali (away, 23 September)

The 1990 season was the 66th year in Guria's history and first season in the Umaglesi Liga, which was launched by the Georgian Football Federation following its exit from Soviet football. In addition to the league season, the team also participated in the 1990 Georgian Cup, becoming the first winners of this competition.

== Overview ==
In early February 1990, when Guria were busy with pre-season preparations in Gagra, a nation-wide debate arose whether Georgian teams should continue taking part in Soviet competitions. The Gurians were in a delicate situation when, from one hand, they would not mind exploiting the success resulted from a hard-fought promotion battle in 1989 but, from the other one, could not ignore strong national aspirations directed against anything Soviet. The club seemed divided with the management inclined to opt in favour of the Top League, but it faced opposition from players who also had their say. Eventually, when supporters of a national league idea prevailed, Guria enthusiastically embraced it. They had to go through certain changes, though. Manager Mykhailo Fomenko who had coached the team for last three seasons, as well as several players from other republics departed. Instead, two footballers were signed from Lithuania who likewise broke ties with Soviet football.

As 18 teams from across four divisions formed the Umaglesi Liga, Guria were in a pole position along with Dinamo Tbilisi, now renamed as Iberia. They had an excellent start to the season, winning the opening five games with a 14–0 aggregate score. But then the team stumbled, losing three away matches in a row. The race was still wide open until 19 October when Guria sustained a painful home defeat to Iberia in a must-win tie. With this loss, their remarkable 55-game unbeaten home run stretching from 7 April 1988 also came to an end.

The team took revenge on Iberia in the cup semi-finals with a dominant 3–0 aggregate win and faced Tskhumi in a final game held in Tbilisi. Besik Pridonashvili became a hero again, netting an extra-time winner this time.

Guria under coach Gigla Imnadze ended the season in a jubilant mood, becoming the first Georgian cup holders in history and runners-up of the national league. Midfielder Otar Korgalidze was the team topscorer with 21 goals while young defender Gocha Gujabidze was named Discovery of the Year.

== Statistics ==
=== Standings (part) ===
Pos	Team	Pld	W	D	L	GF	GA	GD	Pts
1	Iberia Tbilisi (C)	34	24	6	4	91	23	+68	78
2	Guria Lanchkhuti	34	22	6	6	73	20	+53	72
3	Gorda Rustavi	34	22	3	9	63	33	+30	69
4	Kutaisi	34	20	5	9	62	33	+29	65
5	Kolkheti-1913 Poti	34	19	5	10	53	31	+22	62

Source: rsssf.org
Rules for classification: 1st points; 2nd matches won; 3rd head-to-head
(C) Champions

==== Matches ====
31 March 1	Guria	1 – 0	Dila

4 April 2	Guria	6 – 0	Liakhvi

12 April 3	Guria	2 – 0	Amirani

17 April 4	Odishi	0 – 1	Guria

22 April 5	Guria	4 – 0	Shevardeni 1906

28 April 6	Kolkheti Khobi	1 – 0	Guria

2 May 7	Guria	3 – 0	Tskhumi

7 May 8	Kutaisi	2 – 1	Guria

11 May 9	Guria	2 – 0	Mertskhali

15 May 10	Sanavardo	1 – 0	Guria

20 May 11	Guria	2 – 0	Samgurali

1 June 12	Guria	0 – 0	Batumi

10 June 14	Guria	6 – 1	Mziuri

15 June 15	Iveria	0 – 4	Guria

20 June 13	Iberia	1 – 1	Guria

25 June 16	Guria	2 – 0	Kolkheti Poti

2 July 17	Gorda	0 – 0	Guria

9 August 19	Liakhvi	1 – 5	Guria

13 August 20	Amirani	0 – 0	Guria

19 August 21	Guria	5 – 0	Odishi

23 August 22	Shevardeni	1 – 8	Guria

1 September 23	Guria	3 – 0	Kolkheti Khobi

10 September 24	Tskhumi	1 – 3	Guria

14 September 25	Guria	2 – 2	Kutaisi

23 September 26	Mertshali	5 – 2	Guria

27 September 27	Dila	1 – 0	Guria

4 October 28	Samgurali	1 – 2	Guria

14 October 29	Batumi	0 – 1	Guria

19 October 30	Guria	0 – 1	Iberia

29 October 31	Mziuri	0 – 0	Guria

3 November 32	Guria	3 – 1	Iveria

8 November 33	Kolkheti Poti	0 – 1	Guria

12 November 34	Guria	2 – 0	Gorda

=== Appearances and goals ===
Pos.	Player	DOB	L App	L
GK	(Georgia (country)) Mamuka Abuseridze	1962	2	-
GK	(Georgia (country)) Avtandil Kantaria	1955	32	–
DF	(Georgia (country)) Badri Danelia	1962	25	3
DF	(Georgia (country)) Gocha Gujabidze	1971	20	1
DF	(Georgia (country)) Temur Kabisashvili	1967	27	0
DF	(Georgia (country)) Giorgi Khurtsilava	1971	4	0
DF	(Georgia (country)) Roman Kuridze	1965	16	0
DF	(Georgia (country)) Kakha Kvintradze	1971	16	0
DF	(Lithuania) Romas Mažeikis	1964	23	0
DF	(Georgia (country)) Gocha Tkebuchava	1963	27	3
DF	(Georgia (country)) Davit Tsomaia	1967	30	2
MF	(Georgia (country)) Zaza Bakuradze	1968	12	1
MF	(Georgia (country)) Levan Baratashvili	1964	23	0
MF	(Georgia (country)) Gia Chkhaidze	1970	30	0
MF	(Georgia (country)) Otar Korgalidze	1960	31	21
MF	(Georgia (country)) Teimuraz Loria	1971	5	0
MF	(Georgia (country)) Nugzar Mikaberidze	1963	25	4
FW	(Lithuania) Robertas Fridrikas	1967	20	11
FW	(Georgia (country)) Besik Pridonashvili	1961	32	13
FW	(Georgia (country)) Davit Ugrelidze	1964	28	14

=== Georgian Cup ===
==== Round of 32 ====
1st	Margveti	2–0	Guria	Zestaponi

2nd	Guria	4–0	Margveti	Lanchkhuti

==== Round of 16 ====
1st	Mziuri	1–0	Guria	Gali

2nd	Guria	4–2	Mziuri	Lanchkhuti

==== Quarterfinals ====
1st	Guria	5–1	Kutaisi	Lanchkhuti

2nd	Kutaisi	1–0	Guria	Kutaisi

==== Semifinals ====
1st	Iberia	0–1	Guria	Tbilisi

2nd	Guria	2–0	Iberia	Lanchkhuti

==== Final ====
Guria	1–0 (a.e.t.)	Tskhumi	Tbilisi
Pridonashvili 95'			Stadium: Boris Paichadze National Stadium; Attendance: 35,000; Referee: Merab Malaguradze
