= 1987 FC Guria season =

Guria
1987 season
- Chairman: Giorgi Bakanidze
- Manager: Mikhail Fomenko
- Stadium: Guria stadium, Lanchkhuti
- Top League: 16th of 16 (relegated)
- Soviet Cup: Round of 32
- Top goalscorer: League: Viktor Khlus (5); All: Viktor Khlus (6)
- Highest home attendance: 23,200 vs Neftchi, 18 May
- Biggest win: 2–0 v Kairat (home, 3 April); 2–0 v Ararat (home, 20 September)
- Biggest defeat: 0–3 v Dinamo Minsk (away, 12 April); 0–3 v Torpedo (home, 31 October)

The 1987 season was the 63rd year in Guria's history and 1st season in the top tier of Soviet football. In addition to the league season, the team also participated in the 1987–88 Soviet Cup.

== Overview ==
Following their promotion from the 1986 Soviet First League the previous year, Guria made a debut in the top flight with coach Mikhail Fomenko, several new players and a hastily enlarged stadium. Unlike stadiums across the Soviet republics, it was purely a football arena which underwent a thorough reconstruction within two months in early 1987.

Spartak Moscow who were to become champions this year, began their league campaign at Guria. Having earned a single point in the opening three games, Guria recorded their first top-division victory in round 4 with Merab Megreladze scoring a historic goal against Kairat on 3 April. It was evident though that the team would struggle to retain a place in the league. By mid-season, the Gurians had found themselves rooted to the bottom of the table, winning just one out of eight games held in the summer.

In July, Guria entered the cup competition as well. The team breezed past 2nd division side Rotor at home and took an early lead in the return leg, but conceded three late goals to lose on away goals.

Back in the league, Guria produced an unbeaten run in September (2W, 2D), although failure to beat fellow strugglers CSKA cost them dearly. As a relegation dogfight heated up, they first suffered a 2–0 defeat from Dinamo Tbilisi on 3 October and then went on to lose all remaining matches one after another.

Guria proved yet again to be a home team, beating their rivals in Lanchkhuti only, but a dreadful away form (four points in 15 games) determined their immediate return to the First League.

== Statistics ==
=== Top League ===
==== Standings (part) ====
Pos	Team	PLD	W	D	L	GF–GA	Pts
12	Kairat	30	10	6	14	27–38	26
13	Dinamo Tbilisi	30	9	7	14	31–40	25
14	Zenit	30	7	10	13	25–37	24
15	CSKA (R)	30	7	11	12	26–35	24 (Note: One point deducted (10 draws limit))
16	Guria (R)	30	5	8	17	18–38	18

==== Matches ====
14 March 2	Guria	0 – 2	Spartak	Lanchkhuti
			Pasulko 35' Rodionov 47'	Attendance: 21,300

21 March 3	Metalist	0 – 0	Guria	Kharkov
				Attendance: 18,300

28 March 4	Torpedo	1 – 0	Guria	Moscow
	Savichev 17'			Attendance: 6,600

3 April 5	Guria	2 – 0	Kairat	Lanchkhuti
	Megreladze 43'; Akopyan 88'			Attendance: 22,000

6 April 6	Guria	1 – 1	Zenit	Lanchkhuti
	Khlus 63'		Afanasyev 64'	Attendance: 22,000

12 April 7	Dinamo Minsk	3 – 0	Guria	Minsk
	Zygmantovich 5'; Shalimo 30'; Gotsmanov 69'			Attendance: 44,000

2 May 8	Zalgiris	0 – 0	Guria	Vilnius
				Attendance: 8,500

10 May 9	Ararat	3 – 2	Guria	Yerevan
	Veranyan 4', 64'; Khashmanyan 20'		Pridonashvili 8', 45'	Attendance: 37,400

18 May 10	Guria	1 – 0	Neftchi	Lanchkhuti
	Khlus 16'			Attendance: 23,200

26 May 11	Guria	0 – 0	Dinamo Tbilisi	Lanchkhuti
				Attendance: 22,000

7 June 12	Guria	1 – 2	Dnepr	Lanchkhuti
	Kopaleishvili 6'		Litovchenko 54'; Protasov 56'	Attendance: 22,000

10 June 13	Guria	0 – 2	Shakhtyor	Lanchkhuti
			Svistun 10'; Yurchenko 81'	Attendance: 22,000

17 June 14	CSKA	0 – 0	Guria	Moscow
				Attendance: 12,300

22 June 15	Dinamo Moscow	1 – 0	Guria	Moscow
	Stukashov 68'			Attendance: 6,500

27 June 16	Guria	0 – 2	Zalgiris	Lanchkhuti
			Narbekovas 53', 57'	Attendance: 20,000

14 July 17	Guria	2 – 1	Dinamo Minsk	Lanchkhuti
	Jishkariani 73'; Pridonashvili 86' (pen.)		Gurinovich 84'	Attendance: 22,000

25 July 18	Kairat	1 – 0	Guria	Alma-ata
	Karachun 81'			Attendance: 28,000

29 July 19	Zenit	1 – 0	Guria	Leningrad
			Afanasyev 49'	Attendance: 6,000

3 August 1	Guria	0 – 0	Dinamo Kiev	Lanchkhuti
				Attendance: 22,000

20 August 21	Dnepr	3 – 1	Guria	Dnepropetrovsk
	Tishchenko 58'; Protasov 74' Shakhov 78'		Tsomaia 77'	Attendance: 25,000

24 August 22	Shakhtyor	2 – 0	Guria	Donetsk
	Svistun 13'; Yashchenko 85'			Attendance: 35,000

2 September 23	Guria	2 – 1	Dinamo Moscow	Lanchkhuti
	Chkhaidze 24'; Khlus 87'		Stukashov 41'	Attendance: 22,000

12 September 24	Neftchi	2 – 2	Guria	Baku
	Suleymanov 20'; Guseynov 37'		Khlus 33', 47'	Attendance: 37,600

20 September 25	Guria	2 – 0	Ararat	Lanchkhuti
	Tevzadze 67'; Akopyan 86'			Attendance: 22,000

29 September 20	Guria	1 – 1	CSKA	Lanchkhuti
	E.Tevzadze 68'		Kuznetsov 61'	Attendance: 22,000

4 October 26	Dinamo Tbilisi	2 – 0	Guria	Tbilisi
	Ketsbaia 44', 49'			Attendance: 25,000

16 October 27	Guria	0 – 1	Metalist	Lanchkhuti
			Buryak 11' (pen.)	Attendance: 20,000

31 October 28	Guria	0 – 3	Torpedo	Volgograd
			N.Savichev 7'; Y.Savichev 16'; Agashkov 47' (pen.)	Attendance: 5,000

9 November 29	Spartak	1 – 0	Guria	Moscow
	Cherenkov 83'			Attendance: 35,000

16 November 30	Dinamo Kiev	2 – 1	Guria	Kiev
	Mikhailichenko 29' Belanov 34'		Varnavskiy 69'	Attendance: 14,500

=== Appearances and goals ===
Pos.	Player	Age	L App	L
GK	(Georgian Soviet Socialist Republic) Ivan Beradze	18	1	–
GK	(Georgian Soviet Socialist Republic) Gigla Imnadze	32	16	–
GK	(Georgian Soviet Socialist Republic) Avtandil Kantaria	32	15	–
DF	(Russian Soviet Federative Socialist Republic) Gennadi Bondaruk	23	8	0
DF	(Georgian Soviet Socialist Republic) Badri Danelia	25	9	0
DF	(Ukrainian Soviet Socialist Republic) Alexandr Kondratiev	25	4	0
DF	(Georgian Soviet Socialist Republic) Nugzar Mikaberidze	24	24	0
DF	(Ukrainian Soviet Socialist Republic) Alexandr Prikhodko	21	2	0
DF	(Georgian Soviet Socialist Republic) Merab Tevzadze	23	16	0
MF	(Georgian Soviet Socialist Republic) Gocha Tkebuchava	24	27	0
DF	(Georgian Soviet Socialist Republic) Davit Tsomaia	20	10	1
DF	(Russian Soviet Federative Socialist Republic) Alexey Varnavsky	30	7	1
MF	(Georgian Soviet Socialist Republic) Teimuraz Chkhaidze	32	18	1
MF	(Georgian Soviet Socialist Republic) Vakhtang Kopaleishvili	33	24	1
MF	(Georgian Soviet Socialist Republic) Malkhaz Arziani	23	15	0
FW	(Georgian Soviet Socialist Republic) Gia Jishkariani	20	11	1
MF	(Georgian Soviet Socialist Republic) Tariel Kapanadze	25	2	0
MF	(Georgian Soviet Socialist Republic) Malkhaz Makharadze	24	18	0
MF	(Russian Soviet Federative Socialist Republic) Nikolay Romanchuk	26	13	0
MF	(Georgian Soviet Socialist Republic) Enuki Tevzadze	28	29	2
FW	(Georgian Soviet Socialist Republic) Murman Akopyan	29	19	2
FW	(Georgian Soviet Socialist Republic) Kakhaber Gogichaishvili	19	5	0
FW	(Georgian Soviet Socialist Republic) Irakli Imnadze	19	1	0
MF	(Georgian Soviet Socialist Republic) Avtandil Kapanadze	25	2	0
FW	(Russian Soviet Federative Socialist Republic) Roman Khagba	23	2	0
FW	(Ukrainian Soviet Socialist Republic) Viktor Khlus	29	30	5
FW	(Georgian Soviet Socialist Republic) Merab Megreladze	30	20	1
FW	(Georgian Soviet Socialist Republic) Besik Pridonashvili	26	21	3
FW	(Georgian Soviet Socialist Republic) Grigol Tsaava	25	9	0

=== Soviet Cup ===
6 July 1987 Round of 32, 1st leg	Guria	4–2	Rotor	Lanchkhuti
	Kopaleishvili 6', 57'; Khlus 52'; Pridonashvili 68' (pen.)		Shaymuhametov 27'; Sergeyev 89'	Attendance: 16,000

18 July 1987 Round of 32, 2nd leg	Rotor	3–1	Guria	Volgograd
	Khokhlov 73'; Nikitin 84'; Chupin 87'		Pridonashvili 7' (pen.)	Attendance: 12,000

Guria lost on away goals rule
