= 1986 FC Guria season =

Guria
1986 season
- Chairman: Shota Pataraia
- Manager: Begi Sikharulidze
- Stadium: Central stadium, Lanchkhuti
- First League: 2nd of 24 (promoted)
- Soviet Cup: Round of 32
- Top goalscorer: League: Besik Pridonashvili (27); All: Besik Pridonashvili (27)
- Highest home attendance: 16,500 vs Atlantas, 23 October vs Daugava, 26 October
- Biggest win: 6–1 v Atlantas (home, 23 October)
- Biggest defeat: 0–4 v Dinamo Stavropol (away, 31 May); 0–4 v CSKA (away, 19 September)

The 1986 season was the 62nd year in FC Guria's existence and the 7th consecutive season in the 2nd tier of Soviet football. In addition to the league season, the team also participated in the Soviet Cup.

On 12 November 1986, Guria beat Lokomotiv Moscow to achieve their first ever promotion to the top Soviet league. They finished the season on 61 points, their highest in the First League.

== Overview ==
Following an unimpressive performance in the previous season which resulted in the 17th place, Guria were hardly expected to become the league favourites in 1986. Initially, CSKA and Daugava seemed firmly among the top teams with the latter reaching a ten-point advantage with ten games remaining. Taking into account the existing regulations which stipulated two points for a win, Daugava appeared on the verge of winning one of the two promotion spots after a twenty-game unbeaten run. However, in the final part they stumbled, picking up only seven points and losing a crunch game at Guria who meanwhile recorded eight wins in the same period. As jubilant crowds stormed the pitch in celebration of this victory, Guria had to relocate for a decisive clash against Lokomotiv Moscow to Batumi where Besik Pridonashvili's late winner sealed a historic achievement for the team.

Guria finished on top of the table, although a 3–1 defeat to Fakel on the final day meant that an additional tie for the first spot would be played between Guria and CSKA who finished the season on equal points.

They achieved the most wins (28) and performed as the strongest home team with 21 wins out of 23. Pridonashvili, who netted 27 times, shared the league goalscorer's award with Pamir's Vazgen Manasyan.

For a provincial center with the population of roughly 9,000, the 1986 season became the most cherished triumph in Guria's history. Manager Begi Sikharulidze and two players later received the Knight of Sport award for this achievement.

== Statistics ==
=== First League ===
==== Standings (part) ====
Pos	Team	PLD	W	D	L	GF–GA	Pts
1	CSKA	46	26	9	11	63–35	61
2	Guria	46	28	5	13	80–68	61
3	Daugava	46	24	14	8	82–46	60 (Note: 12 draws limit was applied during the season)
4	SKA Karpaty	46	22	10	14	69–52	54
5	Pamir	46	21	13	12	76–48	54

==== Regular season ====
30 March 1986 1	Guria	2 – 0	SKA Rostov	Lanchkhuti
	Pridonashvili 8'; Ugrelidze 37'			Attendance: 9,500; Referee: O.Chinionov (Moscow)

2 April 1986 1	Guria	1 – 0	Kuban	Lanchkhuti
	Kopaleishvili 21'			Attendance: 9,000; Referee: G.Iliakov (Simferopol)

9 April 1986 3	Atlantas	1 – 1	Guria	Klaipėda
	Butkevicius 83'		Kopaleishvili 53'	Attendance: 7,000; Referee: A.Balakin (Kyiv)

12 April 1986 4	Daugava	3 – 0	Guria	Riga
	Starikov 4', 27'; Alekseenko 45'			Attendance: 3,350; Referee: F.Giznatullin (Kazan)

17 April 1986 5	Guria	3 – 1	Pakhtakor	Lanchkhuti
	Tkebuchava 43' (pen.), 73' (pen.); Pridonashvili 87' (pen.)		Kabaev 56'	Attendance: 8,500; Referee: V.Matveev (Kazan)

20 April 1986 6	Guria	2 – 1	Pamir	Lanchkhuti
	Tkebuchava 44'; Pridonashvili 65'		Muhamadiev 43'	Attendance: 7,500; Referee: A.Kartavtsev (Moscow)

26 April 1986 7	SKA Karpaty	3 – 0	Guria	Lvov
	Lendel 16'; Malyshenko 31'; Gamaly 44' (pen.)			Attendance: 6,000; Referee: N.Yurov (Tomsk)

29 April 1986 8	Nistru	1 – 2	Guria	Chișinău
	Buloshenko 35'		Akopyan 17'; Ugrelidze 67'	Attendance: 3,750; Referee: R.Yushka (Vilnius)

11 May 1986 9	Guria	5 – 2	Spartak Orjonikidze	Lanchkhuti
	Ugrelidze 43', 52'; Kopaleishvili 45'; Pridonashvili 65'; Akopyan 78'		Kozyrev 68'; Korkin 85'	Attendance: 9,000; Referee: E.Didur (Moscow)

17 May 1986 10	Guria	1 – 0	Rotor	Lanchkhuti
	Ugrelidze 83'			Attendance: 9,500; Referee: A.Gorin (Chisinau)

20 May 1986 11	Guria	0 – 2	CSKA	Lanchkhuti
			Pyatnitsky 49'; Berezin 55'	Attendance: 10,000; Referee: P.Kobichik (Chernovtsy)

28 May 1986 12	Rostselmash	4 – 4	Guria	Rostov
	Povalyaev 30'; Popadopulo 67'; Okunev 85', 86'		Pridonashvili 8', 45'; Chkhaidze 35'; Kopaleishvili 54'	Attendance: 9,000; Referee: V.Guskov (Moscow)

31 May 1986 13	Dinamo Stavropol	4 – 0	Guria	Stavropol
	Grunichev 38'; Osipov 71' (pen.), 80'; Cherepanov 86'		Tkebuchava (penalty missed) 57'	Attendance: 10,000; Referee: K.Ermakov (Fergana)

7 June 1986 14	Guria	3 – 0	Metalurg	Lanchkhuti
	Tkebuchava 6', 68'; Pridonashvili 89' (pen.)			Attendance: 5,000; Referee: V.Razdayev (Kemerovo)

10 June 1986 15	Guria	1 – 0	Kolos	Lanchkhuti
	Topuridze 83'			Attendance: 4,500; Referee: V.Filippov (Moscow)

18 June 1986 16	Kuzbass	0 – 0	Guria	Kemerovo
				Attendance: 4,000; Referee: P.Kobichik (Chernovtsy)

21 June 1986 17	SKA Khabarovsk	0 – 0	Guria	Khabarovsk
				Attendance: 900

28 June 1986 18	Guria	2 – 0	Iskra	Lanchkhuti
	Ebanoidze 21'; Pridonashvili 58'			Attendance: 5,000; Referee: A.Lunin (Moscow)

1 July 1986 19	Guria	3 – 0	Shinnik	Lanchkhuti
	Chkhaidze 25', 79'; Akopyan 72'			Attendance: 4,500; Referee: A.Balakin (Kyiv)

9 July 1986 20	Dinamo Batumi	0 – 1	Guria	Batumi
			E.Tevzadze	Attendance: 5,000; Referee: E.Shkola (Lutsk)

12 July 1986 21	Kotaik	3 – 0	Guria	Abovyan
	Osipyan 47'; Safaryan 62'; Sargsyan 69'			Attendance: 5,100; Referee: V.Belousov (Volzhkiy)

18 July 1986 22	Guria	2 – 0	Fakel	Lanchkhuti
	Chkhaidze 24'; E.Tevzadze 36'			Attendance: 8,500; Referee: I.Vergopulo (Moscow)

22 July 1986 23	Lokomotiv Moscow	3 – 1	Guria	Moscow
	Kalashnikov 33'; Gladilin 54' (pen.), 73'		Chkhaidze 88'	Attendance: 1,000; Referee: E.Shkola (Lutsk)

30 July 1986 24	Guria	2 – 1	Kotayk	Lanchkhuti
	Chkhaidze 28'; Kopaleishvili 70'		Akopian 9'	Attendance: 4,000; Referee: E.Aleksandrov (Yaroslav)

2 August 1986 25	Guria	2 – 0	Dinamo Batumi	Lanchkhuti
	Topuridze 42'; Kopaleishvili 76'		Gorgiladze (penalty missed) 50'	Attendance: 10,000; Referee: E.Shkola (Lutsk)

9 August 1986 26	Iskra	1 – 0	Guria	Smolensk
	Neishteter 60'			Attendance: 2,700; Referee: A.Mamajanov (Dushanbe)

12 August 1986 27	Shinnik	2 – 0	Guria	Yaroslav
	Mentyukov 19'; Martyamov 45'			Attendance: 7,000; Referee: A.Balakin (Kyiv)

18 August 1986 28	Guria	2 – 4	Kuzbass	Lanchkhuti
	Danelia 42'; Kopaleishvili 75'		Zemlin 34', 55', 59', 63'	Attendance: 10,000; Referee: V.Ivushin (Riga)

21 August 1986 29	Guria	2 – 1	SKA Khabarovsk	Lanchkhuti
	Topuridze 22'; Kopaleishvili 70'		Kozlov 59'	Attendance: 6,500; Referee: A.Degtyarev (Odesa)

27 August 1986 30	Kolos	1 – 1	Guria	Nikopol
	Fedorenko 13'		Kopaleishvili 76'	Attendance: 3,400; Referee: V.Filippov (Moscow)

30 August 1986 31	Metalurg	1 – 2	Guria	Zaporozhia
	Shakhov 71'		Pridonashvili 10', 32'	Attendance: 3,000

6 September 1986 32	Guria	2 – 1	Rostselmash	Lanchkhuti
	Pridonashvili 14', 26'		Okunev 10'	Attendance: 12,000; Referee: V.Guskov (Moscow)

9 September 1986 33	Guria	2 – 1	Dinamo Stavropol	Lanchkhuti
	Pridonashvili 49'; E.Tevzadze 73'		Gromov 30'	Attendance: 12,500; Referee: A.Khorlin (Moscow)

16 September 1986 34	Rotor	4 – 2	Guria	Volgograd
	Khomutetsky 49' (pen.); Kontsovenko 57', 72'; Nikitin 78'		M.Tevzadze 61'; Pridonashvili 74'	Attendance: 17,000; Referee: V.Abgolts (Alma-Ata)

19 September 1986 35	CSKA	4 – 0	Guria	Moscow
	Berezin 29', 35', 81'; Savchenko 74'			Attendance: 8,200; Referee: P.Kobichik (Chernovtsy)

28 September 1986 36	Spartak Orjonikidze	3 – 4	Guria	Ordjonikidze
	Ploshnik 6'; Babenko 37' (pen.), 72'		Pridonashvili 58', 61' (pen.), 86'; Kopaleishvili 77'	Attendance: 4,500; Referee: V.Ageev (Kustanay)

5 October 1986 37	Guria	3 – 1	SKA Karpaty	Lanchkhuti
	Pridonashvili 40'; E.Tevzadze 54'; Kopaleishvili 68'		Kukhlevsky 84'	Attendance: 15,000; Referee: N.Yurov (Tomsk)

8 October 1986 38	Guria	4 – 1	Nistru	Lanchkhuti
	Akopyan 4'; Pridonashvili 34' (pen.), 85'; Kopaleishvili 40'		Matyura 88'	Attendance: 16,200; Referee: Y.Savchenko (Moscow)

14 October 1986 39	Pakhtakor	2 – 3	Guria	Tashkent
	Gess 20', 64'		Pridonashvili 12' (pen.); Kopaleishvili 49', 80'	Attendance: 1,280; Referee: A.Khokhryakov (Yoshkar-Ola)

17 October 1986 40	Pamir	4 – 2	Guria	Dushanbe
	Muhamadiev 13'; Manasyan 27', 29'; Rakhimov 80'		Akopyan 55'; Pridonashvili 87'	Attendance: 12,000; Referee: P.Kobichik (Chernovtsy)

23 October 1986 41	Guria	6 – 1	Atlantas	Lanchkhuti
	Chkhaidze 8'; Pridonashvili 30', 51'; Shvetsov 60'; E.Tevzadze 76'; Akopyan 78'		Tamilavicius 88'	Attendance: 16,500; Referee: M.Kusen (Lvov)

26 October 1986 42	Guria	2 – 1	Daugava	Lanchkhuti
	Pridonashvili 56'; Kopaleishvili 57'		Starkov 23'	Attendance: 16,500; Referee: F.Gizatullin (Kazan)

2 November 1986 43	SKA Rostov	0 – 1	Guria	Rostov
			Akopyan 83'	Attendance: 2,300; Referee: V.Abgolts (Alma-Ata)

6 November 1986 44	Kuban	1 – 2	Guria	Krasnodar
	Gerasimov 71'		Kopaleishvili 54'; Chkhaidze 76'	Attendance: 3,200; Referee: A.Gorin (Cichinau)

12 November 1986 45	Guria	1 – 0	Lokomotiv Moscow	Batumi
	Pridonashvili 76'			Attendance: 20,000; Referee: I.Dutko (Lvov)

15 November 1986 46	Fakel	3 – 1	Guria	Voronezh
	Shmarov 29'; Sokolov 35'; Sosulin 53' (pen.)		Pridonashvili 71' (pen.)	Attendance: 4,600; Referee: G.Iliakov (Simferopol)

==== Match for 1st place ====
23 November 1986	CSKA	2–0	Guria	Uzhgorod
	Kolesnikov 40'; S.Fokin 70' (pen.)	Report	(red card) 82' Danelia	Attendance: 7,200; Referee: Vladimir Kuznetsov (Omsk)

=== Appearances and goals ===
Pos.	Player	Age	L App	L
GK	(Georgian Soviet Socialist Republic) Gigla Imnadze	31	35	0
GK	(Georgian Soviet Socialist Republic) Karlo Mchedlidze	29	13	0
DF	(Georgian Soviet Socialist Republic) Badri Danelia	24	43	1
DF	(Georgian Soviet Socialist Republic) Gia Gigatadze	22	1	0
DF	(Georgian Soviet Socialist Republic) Gia Giligashvili	26	29	0
DF	(Georgian Soviet Socialist Republic) Davit Imnadze	16	1	0
DF	(Ukrainian Soviet Socialist Republic) Alexandr Kondratiev	24	36	0
DF	(Georgian Soviet Socialist Republic) Levan Melikia	31	41	0
DF	(Georgian Soviet Socialist Republic) Davit Sanikidze	21	5	0
DF	(Russian Soviet Federative Socialist Republic) Sergei Shvetsov	26	40	1
DF	(Georgian Soviet Socialist Republic) Merab Tevzadze	22	32	3
MF	(Georgian Soviet Socialist Republic) Teimuraz Chkhaidze	31	44	8
MF	(Georgian Soviet Socialist Republic) Vakhtang Kopaleishvili	32	40	16
MF	(Georgian Soviet Socialist Republic) Enuki Tevzadze	27	40	3
MF	(Georgian Soviet Socialist Republic) Gocha Tkebuchava	23	42	4
FW	(Georgian Soviet Socialist Republic) Murman Akopyan	28	43	7
FW	(Georgian Soviet Socialist Republic) Teimuraz Ebanoidze	29	40	1
FW	(Georgian Soviet Socialist Republic) Irakli Imnadze	18	15	0
MF	(Georgian Soviet Socialist Republic) Mamuka Kiladze	19	3	0
FW	(Georgian Soviet Socialist Republic) Besik Pridonashvili	25	46	27
FW	(Georgian Soviet Socialist Republic) Ivan Topuridze	27	13	3
FW	(Georgian Soviet Socialist Republic) Davit Ugrelidze	22	11	5

=== Soviet Cup ===
3 May 1986 1st round	Zorkiy	2–1	Guria	Krasnogorsk
	Romanov 17'; Bondarev 49'		Ugrelidze 28'	Attendance: 2,500; Referee: B.Sultanbayev (Frunze)
