= 1976 in Soviet football =

Football in the Soviet Union
- Season: 1976

Men's football
- Top League: Dinamo Moscow (spring); Torpedo Moscow (fall)
- First League: Kairat Alma-Ata
- Second League: Guria Lanchkhuti (Group 1); Meliorator Yangiyer (Group 2); Dinamo Leningrad (Group 3); Mashuk Pyatigorsk (Group 4); UralMash Sverdlovsk (Group 5); Krivbass Krivoi Rog (Group 6)
- Soviet Cup: Dinamo Tbilisi

The 1976 Soviet football championship was the 44th–45th seasons of competitive football in the Soviet Union, the 38th–39th among teams of masters. Dinamo Moscow won the Top League spring championship becoming the Soviet domestic champions for the eleventh and the last time, while Torpedo Moscow won the Top League fall championship becoming the Soviet domestic champions for the third and also the last time.

== Honours ==
| Competition | | Winner | Runner-up |
|---|---|---|---|
| Top League | spring | Dinamo Moscow (11*) | Ararat Yerevan |
| Top League | fall | Torpedo Moscow (3) | Dinamo Kiev |
| First League | | Kairat Alma-Ata (1) | Neftchi Baku |
| Second League | Group 1 | Guria Lanchkhuti | Dinamo Brest |
| Second League | Group 2 | Meliorator Yangiyer | Neftyanik Fergana |
| Second League | Group 3 | Dinamo Leningrad | Iskra Smolensk |
| Second League | Group 4 | Mashuk Pyatigorsk | RostSelMash Rostov-na-Donu |
| Second League | Group 5 | UralMash Sverdlovsk | SKA Khabarovsk |
| Second League | Group 6 | Krivbass Krivoi Rog | Metallist Kharkov |
| Soviet Cup | | Dinamo Tbilisi (1) | Ararat Yerevan |

Notes = Number in parentheses is the times that club has won that honour. * indicates new record for competition

== Soviet Union football championship ==
=== Top League ===
==== Spring ====
| Pos | Team | Pld | W | D | L | GF | GA | GD | Pts |
|---|---|---|---|---|---|---|---|---|---|
| 1 | (Russian Soviet Federative Socialist Republic) Dynamo Moscow (C) | 15 | 9 | 4 | 2 | 17 | 8 | +9 | 22 |
| 2 | (Armenian Soviet Socialist Republic) Ararat Yerevan | 15 | 8 | 3 | 4 | 22 | 13 | +9 | 19 |
| 3 | (Georgian Soviet Socialist Republic) Dinamo Tbilisi | 15 | 7 | 4 | 4 | 18 | 10 | +8 | 18 |
| 4 | (Ukrainian Soviet Socialist Republic) Karpaty Lviv | 15 | 7 | 4 | 4 | 25 | 19 | +6 | 18 |
| 5 | (Ukrainian Soviet Socialist Republic) Shakhtar Donetsk | 15 | 7 | 4 | 4 | 15 | 16 | −1 | 18 |
| 6 | (Russian Soviet Federative Socialist Republic) Krylya Sovetov Kuibyshev | 15 | 6 | 5 | 4 | 18 | 15 | +3 | 17 |
| 7 | (Russian Soviet Federative Socialist Republic) CSKA Moscow | 15 | 5 | 5 | 5 | 20 | 16 | +4 | 15 |
| 8 | (Ukrainian Soviet Socialist Republic) Dynamo Kyiv | 15 | 5 | 5 | 5 | 14 | 12 | +2 | 15 |
| 9 | (Byelorussian Soviet Socialist Republic) Dinamo Minsk | 15 | 6 | 3 | 6 | 17 | 18 | −1 | 15 |
| 10 | (Ukrainian Soviet Socialist Republic) Chornomorets Odessa | 15 | 4 | 7 | 4 | 14 | 18 | −4 | 15 |
| 11 | (Ukrainian Soviet Socialist Republic) Dnipro Dnipropetrovsk | 15 | 6 | 2 | 7 | 18 | 18 | 0 | 14 |
| 12 | (Russian Soviet Federative Socialist Republic) Torpedo Moscow | 15 | 5 | 4 | 6 | 15 | 20 | −5 | 14 |
| 13 | (Russian Soviet Federative Socialist Republic) Zenit Leningrad | 15 | 4 | 5 | 6 | 14 | 15 | −1 | 13 |
| 14 | (Russian Soviet Federative Socialist Republic) Spartak Moscow | 15 | 4 | 2 | 9 | 10 | 18 | −8 | 10 |
| 15 | (Russian Soviet Federative Socialist Republic) Lokomotiv Moscow | 15 | 3 | 3 | 9 | 17 | 23 | −6 | 9 |
| 16 | (Ukrainian Soviet Socialist Republic) Zaria Voroshilovgrad | 15 | 2 | 4 | 9 | 9 | 24 | −15 | 8 |

(C) Champions

==== Autumn (Fall) ====
| Pos | Team | Pld | W | D | L | GF | GA | GD | Pts | Qualification or relegation |
|---|---|---|---|---|---|---|---|---|---|---|
| 1 | (Russian Soviet Federative Socialist Republic) Torpedo Moscow (C) | 15 | 9 | 2 | 4 | 20 | 9 | +11 | 20 | Qualification for European Cup first round |
| 2 | (Ukrainian Soviet Socialist Republic) Dynamo Kyiv | 15 | 6 | 6 | 3 | 22 | 16 | +6 | 18 | Qualification for UEFA Cup first round |
| 3 | (Georgian Soviet Socialist Republic) Dinamo Tbilisi | 15 | 6 | 5 | 4 | 16 | 12 | +4 | 17 | Qualification for UEFA Cup first round |
| 4 | (Ukrainian Soviet Socialist Republic) Karpaty Lviv | 15 | 6 | 5 | 4 | 22 | 19 | +3 | 17 | |
| 5 | (Russian Soviet Federative Socialist Republic) Zenit Leningrad | 15 | 6 | 4 | 5 | 22 | 16 | +6 | 16 | |
| 6 | (Russian Soviet Federative Socialist Republic) Dynamo Moscow | 15 | 7 | 2 | 6 | 15 | 13 | +2 | 16 | Qualification for Cup Winners' Cup first round |
| 7 | (Russian Soviet Federative Socialist Republic) CSKA Moscow | 15 | 5 | 5 | 5 | 21 | 16 | +5 | 15 | |
| 8 | (Russian Soviet Federative Socialist Republic) Lokomotiv Moscow | 15 | 6 | 3 | 6 | 13 | 13 | 0 | 15 | |
| 9 | (Ukrainian Soviet Socialist Republic) Chornomorets Odessa | 15 | 7 | 1 | 7 | 14 | 20 | −6 | 15 | |
| 10 | (Ukrainian Soviet Socialist Republic) Shakhtar Donetsk | 15 | 5 | 4 | 6 | 12 | 10 | +2 | 14 | |
| 11 | (Russian Soviet Federative Socialist Republic) Krylya Sovetov Kuibyshev | 15 | 5 | 4 | 6 | 12 | 15 | −3 | 14 | |
| 12 | (Ukrainian Soviet Socialist Republic) Zaria Voroshilovgrad | 15 | 6 | 2 | 7 | 12 | 17 | −5 | 14 | |
| 13 | (Ukrainian Soviet Socialist Republic) Dnipro Dnipropetrovsk | 15 | 6 | 2 | 7 | 12 | 17 | −5 | 14 | |
| 14 | (Armenian Soviet Socialist Republic) Ararat Yerevan | 15 | 4 | 6 | 5 | 14 | 20 | −6 | 14 | |
| 15 | (Russian Soviet Federative Socialist Republic) Spartak Moscow (R) | 15 | 5 | 3 | 7 | 15 | 18 | −3 | 13 | Relegation to First League |
| 16 | (Byelorussian Soviet Socialist Republic) Dinamo Minsk (R) | 15 | 2 | 4 | 9 | 10 | 21 | −11 | 8 | Relegation to First League |

(C) Champions; (R) Relegated

=== First League ===
| Pos | Rep | Team | Pld | W | D | L | GF | GA | GD | Pts | Promotion or relegation |
|---|---|---|---|---|---|---|---|---|---|---|---|
| 1 | KAZ | Kayrat Alma-Ata | 38 | 24 | 8 | 6 | 55 | 23 | +32 | 56 | Promoted |
| 2 | AZE | Neftchi Baku | 38 | 22 | 10 | 6 | 70 | 34 | +36 | 54 | Promoted |
| 3 | UZB | Pahtakor Tashkent | 38 | 18 | 12 | 8 | 63 | 31 | +32 | 48 | |
| 4 | UKR | Tavria Simferopol | 38 | 17 | 12 | 9 | 59 | 32 | +27 | 46 | |
| 5 | MDA | Nistru Kishinev | 38 | 15 | 14 | 9 | 51 | 40 | +11 | 44 | |
| 6 | RUS | Zvezda Perm | 38 | 15 | 12 | 11 | 53 | 45 | +8 | 42 | |
| 7 | GEO | Torpedo Kutaisi | 38 | 13 | 15 | 10 | 46 | 38 | +8 | 41 | |
| 8 | RUS | Kuzbass Kemerovo | 38 | 16 | 7 | 15 | 59 | 50 | +9 | 39 | |
| 9 | TKM | Kolhozchi Ashkhabad (Note: Kolhozchi Ashkhabad was called Stroitel.) | 38 | 16 | 7 | 15 | 61 | 62 | −1 | 39 | |
| 10 | RUS | Shinnik Yaroslavl | 38 | 15 | 8 | 15 | 41 | 39 | +2 | 38 | |
| 11 | TJK | Pamir Dushanbe | 38 | 14 | 10 | 14 | 43 | 51 | −8 | 38 | |
| 12 | RUS | SKA Rostov-na-Donu | 38 | 13 | 10 | 15 | 41 | 43 | −2 | 36 | |
| 13 | UKR | Metallurg Zaporozhye | 38 | 14 | 8 | 16 | 38 | 40 | −2 | 36 | |
| 14 | UKR | Spartak Ivano-Frankovsk | 38 | 13 | 10 | 15 | 47 | 53 | −6 | 36 | |
| 15 | RUS | Spartak Orjonikidze | 38 | 11 | 14 | 13 | 40 | 50 | −10 | 36 | |
| 16 | RUS | Terek Grozny | 38 | 10 | 13 | 15 | 39 | 60 | −21 | 33 | |
| 17 | RUS | Rubin Kazan | 38 | 6 | 18 | 14 | 39 | 55 | −16 | 30 | |
| 18 | RUS | Kuban Krasnodar | 38 | 10 | 7 | 21 | 34 | 69 | −35 | 27 | Relegated |
| 19 | LVA | Daugava Riga | 38 | 7 | 10 | 21 | 33 | 56 | −23 | 24 | Relegated |
| 20 | RUS | Elbrus Nalchik (Note: Elbrus Nalchik was called Spartak.) | 38 | 5 | 7 | 26 | 32 | 73 | −41 | 17 | Relegated |

Source: rsssf.com

=== Second League (playoffs) ===
[Nov 1, 5]
Guria Lanchkhuti     0-0 0-2  URALMASH Sverdlovsk 
Meliorator Yangiyer  1-1 2-3  DINAMO Leningrad 
Mashuk Pyatigorsk    1-0 0-2  Krivbass Krivoi Rog

Replay

[Nov 11]
KRIVBASS Krivoi Rog  3-0 Mashuk Pyatigorsk [in Simferopol]

=== Top goalscorers ===
Top League

- (spring) Arkadiy Andriasyan (Ararat Yerevan) – 8 goals
- (autumn) Aleksandr Markin (Zenit Leningrad) – 13 goals

First League

- Elbrus Abbasov (Neftchi Baku) – 28 goals
