= 1986 in Soviet football =

Football in the Soviet Union
- Season: 1986

Men's football
- Top League: Dinamo Kiev
- First League: CSKA Moscow
- Second League: Krylia Sovetov Kuibyshev (Finals 1); Geolog Tyumen (Finals 2); Zaria Voroshilovgrad (Finals 3)
- Soviet Cup: Torpedo Moscow

The 1986 Soviet football championship was the 55th seasons of competitive football in the Soviet Union. Dinamo Kiev won the Top League championship becoming the Soviet domestic champions for the twelfth time.

== Honours ==
Competition		Winner	Runner-up
Top League		Dinamo Kiev (12*)	Dinamo Moscow
First League		CSKA Moscow (1)	Guria Lanchkhuti
Second League	Finals 1	Krylia Sovetov Kuibyshev	Kiapaz Kirovobad
Second League	Group 2	Geolog Tyumen	Metallurg Lipetsk
Second League	Group 3	Zaria Voroshilovgrad	Sokhibkor Khalkabad
Soviet Cup		Torpedo Moscow (6)	Shakhter Donetsk

Notes = Number in parentheses is the times that club has won that honour. * indicates new record for competition

== Soviet Union football championship ==
=== Top League ===
Pos	Team	Pld	W	D	L	GF	GA	GD	Pts	Qualification or relegation
1	(Ukrainian Soviet Socialist Republic) Dynamo Kyiv (C)	30	14	11	5	53	33	+20	39	Qualification for European Cup first round
2	(Russian Soviet Federative Socialist Republic) Dinamo Moscow	30	14	11	5	46	26	+20	38 (Note: 1 point deducted (10 draw limit))	Qualification for UEFA Cup first round
3	(Russian Soviet Federative Socialist Republic) Spartak Moscow	30	14	9	7	52	21	+31	37	Qualification for UEFA Cup first round
4	(Russian Soviet Federative Socialist Republic) Zenit Leningrad	30	12	9	9	44	36	+8	33	Qualification for UEFA Cup first round
5	(Georgian Soviet Socialist Republic) Dinamo Tbilisi	30	12	9	9	36	36	0	33	Qualification for UEFA Cup first round
6	(Ukrainian Soviet Socialist Republic) Shakhtar Donetsk	30	11	9	10	40	38	+2	31	
7	(Kazakh Soviet Socialist Republic) Kairat Alma-Ata	30	11	8	11	33	39	−6	30	
8	(Lithuanian Soviet Socialist Republic) Žalgiris Vilnius	30	11	8	11	32	37	−5	30	
9	(Russian Soviet Federative Socialist Republic) Torpedo Moscow	30	10	11	9	31	28	+3	30	
10	(Byelorussian Soviet Socialist Republic) Dinamo Minsk	30	10	8	12	37	40	−3	28	Qualification for Cup Winners' Cup first round
11	(Ukrainian Soviet Socialist Republic) Dnipro Dnipropetrovsk	30	8	12	10	41	41	0	28	
12	(Ukrainian Soviet Socialist Republic) Metalist Kharkiv	30	9	9	12	21	25	−4	27	
13	(Azerbaijan Soviet Socialist Republic) Neftçi Baku	30	8	12	10	33	38	−5	26 (Note: 2 points deducted (10 draw limit))	
14	(Armenian Soviet Socialist Republic) Ararat Yerevan	30	8	10	12	27	44	−17	26	
15	(Ukrainian Soviet Socialist Republic) Chornomorets Odessa (R)	30	8	7	15	29	37	−8	23	Relegation to First League
16	(Georgian Soviet Socialist Republic) Torpedo Kutaisi (R)	30	5	7	18	24	60	−36	17	Relegation to First League

(C) Champions; (R) Relegated

=== First League ===
Pos	Team	Pld	W	D	L	GF	GA	GD	Pts	Promotion or relegation
1	(Russian Soviet Federative Socialist Republic) CSKA Moscow (C, P)	46	26	9	11	61	35	+26	61	Promotion to Top League
2	(Georgian Soviet Socialist Republic) Guria Lanchkhuti (P)	46	28	5	13	80	64	+16	61	Promotion to Top League
3	(Latvian Soviet Socialist Republic) Daugava Riga	46	24	14	8	82	46	+36	60 (Note: There was a limit for the draws earned, 12. Only twelve draws earn a point, in contrast, over the limit draws earn no points.)	
4	(Ukrainian Soviet Socialist Republic) SKA Karpaty Lviv	46	22	10	14	69	52	+17	54	
5	(Tajik Soviet Socialist Republic) Pamir Dushanbe	46	21	13	12	62	46	+16	54	
6	(Russian Soviet Federative Socialist Republic) Lokomotiv Moscow	46	21	11	14	63	48	+15	53	
7	(Russian Soviet Federative Socialist Republic) Rostselmash Rostov-on-Don	46	21	10	15	86	69	+17	52	
8	(Russian Soviet Federative Socialist Republic) Rotor Volgograd	46	22	7	17	69	56	+13	51	
9	(Ukrainian Soviet Socialist Republic) Kolos Nikopol	46	20	11	15	48	45	+3	51	
10	(Russian Soviet Federative Socialist Republic) Fakel Voronezh	46	20	8	18	56	44	+12	48	
11	(Georgian Soviet Socialist Republic) Dinamo Batumi	46	20	8	18	50	59	−9	48	
12	(Ukrainian Soviet Socialist Republic) Metalurh Zaporizhia	46	17	11	18	59	54	+5	45	
13	(Russian Soviet Federative Socialist Republic) Kuzbass Kemerevo	46	16	13	17	63	61	+2	44	
14	(Russian Soviet Federative Socialist Republic) Shinnik Yaroslavl	46	16	14	16	41	45	−4	44	
15	(Russian Soviet Federative Socialist Republic) SKA Rostov-on-Don	46	16	11	19	54	51	+3	43	
16	(Russian Soviet Federative Socialist Republic) Spartak Ordjonikidze	46	15	12	19	58	66	−8	42	
17	(Uzbek Soviet Socialist Republic) Pakhtakor Tashkent	46	15	10	21	55	73	−18	40	
18	(Russian Soviet Federative Socialist Republic) Dynamo Stavropol	46	14	15	17	66	58	+8	40	
19	(Armenian Soviet Socialist Republic) Kotayk Abovyan	46	14	13	19	46	54	−8	40	
20	(Russian Soviet Federative Socialist Republic) Kuban Krasnodar (R)	46	14	14	18	41	48	−7	40	Relegation to Second League
21	(Russian Soviet Federative Socialist Republic) SKA Khabarovsk (R)	46	12	12	22	49	61	−12	36	Relegation to Second League
22	(Russian Soviet Federative Socialist Republic) Iskra Smolensk (R)	46	11	13	22	30	60	−30	34	Relegation to Second League
23	(Lithuanian Soviet Socialist Republic) Atlantas Klaipėda (R)	46	9	11	26	40	75	−35	29	Relegation to Second League
24	(Moldavian Soviet Socialist Republic) Nistru Chisinau (R)	46	6	9	31	31	101	−70	21	Relegation to Second League

(C) Champions; (P) Promoted; (R) Relegated

=== Group 1 ===
Pos	Rep	Team	Pld	W	D	L	GF	GA	GD	Pts	Promotion
1	RUS	Krylya Sovetov Kuibyshev	4	3	1	0	4	1	+3	7	Promoted
2	AZE	Kyapaz Kirovabad	4	1	1	2	4	11	−7	3	
3	RUS	Krasnaya Presnya Moskva	4	1	0	3	9	5	+4	2	

=== Group 2 ===
Pos	Rep	Team	Pld	W	D	L	GF	GA	GD	Pts	Promotion
1	RUS	Geolog Tyumen	4	3	0	1	4	1	+3	6	Promoted
2	RUS	Metallurg Lipetsk	4	2	0	2	6	3	+3	4	
3	KAZ	Meliorator Chimkent	4	1	0	3	2	8	−6	2	

=== Group 3 ===
Pos	Rep	Team	Pld	W	D	L	GF	GA	GD	Pts	Promotion
1	UKR	Zarya Voroshilovgrad	4	3	0	1	8	5	+3	6	Promoted
2	UZB	Sohibkor Halkabad	4	2	0	2	6	9	−3	4	
3	RUS	Sokol Saratov	4	1	0	3	8	8	0	2	

Source: rsssf.com

=== Top goalscorers ===
Top League

- Aleksandr Borodyuk (Dynamo Moscow) – 21 goals

First League

- Vazgen Manasyan (Pamir Dushanbe), Besik Pridonishvili (Guria Lanchkhuti) – 27 goals
