= 1989 FC Guria season =

Guria
1989 season
- Manager: Mikhail Fomenko
- Stadium: Guria stadium, Lanchkhuti
- First League: 2nd of 22 (promoted)
- Soviet Cup: 3rd round
- Top goalscorer: League: Merab Jordania (25); All: Merab Jordania (26)
- Highest home attendance: 22,000 v Pakhtakor (2 November)
- Biggest win: 4–0 v Daugava (home, 9 September)
- Biggest defeat: 1–4 v CSKA (away, 31 August)

The 1989 season was the 65th year in Guria's history and 2nd successive season in the 2nd tier of Soviet football. In addition to the league season, the team also participated in the 1989–90 Soviet Cup.

== Overview ==
Guria's 1989 season pretty much resembled the previous one. After a single win in the opening six matches, they found themselves in the 17th place, only in two-point distance from the relegation zone. The team quickly recovered from this blow, producing a seven-game unbeaten run and, overall, eleven wins in next 15 games. As a result, they finished the half-season 3rd, sharing the points with Kairat. These two teams, along with CSKA, competed for the first two spots this season. The latter, being Guria's bitter rivals for the last four seasons in both 1st and 2nd divisions, ended their head-to-head unbeaten streak on 9 May in Lanchkhuti.

Guria were more convincing in the remaining period than a year earlier, losing only twice in 21 matches. After round 25, they moved into the promotion zone for the first time. The team was rampant in the closing stage of the season with six successive wins. On 2 November, Guria beat Pakhtakor in front of 22,000 celebrating spectators to seal their second promotion in four years.

In the cup, Guria reached the 3rd round to face a top-tier side from Ukraine again. Despite a home win, they suffered a narrow aggregate defeat to Shakhtyor Donetsk and crashed out of the tournament. Overall, Guria displayed a flawless home record with 22 wins in as many official games.

The team was unable to reap the fruits of their 1989 successful league campaign. In the aftermath of 9 April, Georgia began moving away politically from the Soviet Union, becoming the first republic to announce withdrawal from the Soviet-run competitions in February 1990. Guria's eleven players also signed a petition supporting this decision in advance.

== Statistics ==
=== Standings (part) ===
| Pos | Team | PLD | W | D | L | GF–GA | Pts |
|---|---|---|---|---|---|---|---|
| 1 | CSKA | 42 | 27 | 10 | 5 | 113–28 | 64 |
| 2 | Guria | 42 | 27 | 9 | 6 | 78–39 | 63 |
| 3 | Kairat | 42 | 23 | 9 | 10 | 75–39 | 55 |
| 4 | Dinamo Stavropol | 42 | 19 | 12 | 11 | 57–46 | 50 |
| 5 | Fakel | 42 | 19 | 11 | 12 | 54–36 | 49 |

==== Matches ====
| 6 April 1 | Pakhtakor | 2 – 1 | Guria | Tashkent |
| | Sinelobov 33'; Miklyayev 37' | | Pridonashvili 50' | Attendance: 35,000 |

| 9 April | Kairat | 2 – 1 | Guria | Alma-Ata |
| | Masudov 26'; Zhidkov 61' | | Guruli 85' | Attendance: 8,900 |

| 18 April 4 | Guria | 3 – 0 | Shinnik | Lanchkhuti |
| | Guruli 19'; Dozmorov 21', 62' | | | Attendance: 17,000 |

| 25 April 5 | Dinamo Stavropol | 1 – 1 | Guria | Stavropol |
| | Osipov 61' | | Guruli 55' | Attendance: 19,000 |

| 6 May 7 | Fakel | 0 – 0 | Guria | Voronezh |
| | | | | Attendance: 22,500 |

| 9 May 8 | Rostselmash | 1 – 1 | Guria | Rostov |
| | Okunev 71' | | Pridonashvili 78' | Attendance: 6,000 |

| 14 May 9 | Guria | 2 – 1 | CSKA | Lanchkhuti |
| | Jordania 6', 34' (pen.) | | Masalitin 30' | Attendance: 20,000 |

| 19 May 10 | Guria | 2 – 0 | Kuzbass | Lanchkhuti |
| | Jordania 42', 76' | | | Attendance: 18,000 |

| 25 May 11 | Daugava | 0 – 1 | Guria | Riga |
| | | | Jordania 30' | Attendance: 1,600 |

| 28 May 12 | SKA Karpaty | 1 – 1 | Guria | Lanchkhuti |
| | Lendel 24' | | Dozmorov 12' | Attendance: 1,100 |

| 5 June 13 | Guria | 2 – 0 | Nistru | Lanchkhuti |
| | Ugrelidze 33'; Meskhi 55' | | | Attendance: 17,000 |

| 8 June 14 | Guria | 4 – 1 | Tavria | Lanchkhuti |
| | Guruli 23' (pen.), 35'; Tevzadze 57'; Jordania 59' (pen.) | | Volkov 39. | Attendance: 15,500 |

| 13 June 15 | Torpedo Kutaisi | 1 – 2 | Guria | Kutaisi |
| | Shavdatuashvili 22' | | Meskhi 71'; Jordania 83' | Attendance: 21,000 |

| 16 June 16 | Kotayk | 1 – 0 | Guria | Abovyan |
| | Galustyan 29' | | | Attendance: 3,000 |

| 21 June 17 | Guria | 4 – 1 | Metalurg | Lanchkhuti |
| | Jordania 49' (pen.); Guruli 84' | | Storchak 74' | Attendance: 21,000 |

| 24 June 18 | Guria | 3 – 1 | SKA Rostov | Lanchkhuti |
| | Dozmorov 8', 79'; Jordania 63' (pen.) | | Fedkov 85' | Attendance: 19,000 |

| 3 July 19 | SKA Rostov | 1 – 1 | Guria | Ordjonikidze |
| | Kachmazov 51' | | Jordania 32' | Attendance: 16,200 |

| 7 July 20 | Neftchi | 1 – 0 | Guria | Baku |
| | Alekberov 7' | | | Attendance: 12,700 |

| 11 July 21 | Guria | 3 – 0 | Dinamo Batumi | Lanchkhuti |
| | Dozmorov 38'; Jordania 40' (pen.); Ugrelidze 86' | | | Attendance: 18,000 |

| 14 July 22 | Guria | 2 – 0 | Kuban | Lanchkhuti |
| | Guruli 8', 55' | | | Attendance: 17,000 |

| 26 July 3 | Guria | 2 – 1 | Geolog | Lanchkhuti |
| | Korgalidze 31'; Jordania 65' | | Leonenko 32' | Attendance: 17,000 |

| 4 August 23 | Geolog | 1 – 1 | Guria | Tyumen |
| | Sidorov 50' | | Pridonashvili 64' | Attendance: 9,500 |

| 7 August 24 | Shinnik | 0 – 2 | Guria | Yaroslavl |
| | | | Guruli 23'; Ugrelidze 72' | Attendance: 2,500 |

| 16 August 26 | Guria | 2 – 1 | Dinamo Stavropol | Lanchkhuti |
| | Guruli 45', 70' | | Osipov 56' | Attendance: 18,000 |

| 21 August 27 | Guria | 3 – 0 | Fakel | Lanchkhuti |
| | Dozmorov 8'; Pridonashvili 18', 29' | | | Attendance: 18,500 |

| 25 August 28 | Guria | 3 – 2 | Rostselmash | Lanchkhuti |
| | Baratashvili 42'; Pridonashvili 44'; Dozmorov 83' | | Selin 74'; Okunev 90' | Attendance: 18,000 |

| 31 August 29 | CSKA | 4 – 1 | Guria | Moscow |
| | Kuznatsov 45' (pen.); Tatarchuk 54'; Sergeyev 63', 74' | | Pridonashvili 72' | Attendance: 9,500 |

| 3 September 30 | Kuzbass | 0 – 1 | Guria | Kemerovo |
| | | | Korgalidze 71' | Attendance: 3,000 |

| 9 September 31 | Guria | 4 – 0 | Daugava | Lanchkhuti |
| | Jordania 3' (pen.); Dozmorov 46'; Pridonashvili 47'; Tsomaia 60' | | | Attendance: 16,000 |

| 12 September 32 | Guria | 3 – 2 | SKA Karpaty | Lanchkhuti |
| | Jordania 17', 24' (pen.); Dozmorov 32' | | Lendel 43'; Shevchuk 88' | Attendance: 17,000 |

| 17 September 33 | Nistru | 1 – 1 | Guria | Chișinău |
| | Vasilyev 76' (pen.) | | Jordania 83' | Attendance: 11,500 |

| 20 September 34 | Tavria | 2 – 0 | Guria | Simferopol |
| | Gaidash 51'; Smigunov 65' | | | Attendance: 7,100 |

| 25 September 35 | Guria | 3 – 1 | Torpedo Kutaisi | Lanchkhuti |
| | Jordania 56' (pen.), 66'; Guruli 83' | | Megreladze 81' | Attendance: 15,300 |

| 28 September 36 | Guria | 1 – 0 | Kotayk | Lanchkhuti |
| | Jordania 65' (pen.) | | | Attendance: 15,500 |

| 4 October 37 | Metalurg | 1 – 1 | Guria | Zaporozhye |
| | Taran 34' | | Pridonashvili 52' | Attendance: 10,000 |

| 7 October 38 | SKA Rostov | 1 – 1 | Guria | Rostov |
| | Minibayev 84' | | Jordania 17' | Attendance: 3,200 |

| 11 October 42 | Dinamo Batumi | 3 – 4 | Guria | Batumi |
| | Zedania 35'; Aptsiauri 45' (pen.); Bigvava 89' | | Korgalidze 39'; Jordania 57'; Guruli 65'; Tevzadze 85' | Attendance: 17,000 |

| 14 October 39 | Guria | 1 – 0 | Rotor | Lanchkhuti |
| | Jordania 6' | | | Attendance: 15,000 |

| 17 October 40 | Guria | 2 – 0 | Neftchi | Lanchkhuti |
| | Pridonishvili 13'; Jordania 59' (pen.) | | | Attendance: 16,000 |

| 25 October 41 | Kuban | 1 – 3 | Guria | Krasnodar |
| | Andreyev 83' | | Guruli 34' (pen.), 86', 89' | Attendance: 5,300 |

| 2 November 43 | Guria | 4 – 2 | Pakhtakor | Lanchkhuti |
| | Guruli 6', 56'; Korgalidze 19', 70' | | Sheyhametov 4'; Muhadov 71' (pen.) | Attendance: 22,000 |

| 5 November 44 | Guria | 3 – 1 | Kairat | Lanchkhuti |
| | Jordania 32', 36'; Korgalidze 35' | | Popandopulo 54' | Attendance: 20,000 |

=== Appearances and goals ===
| Pos. | Player | Age | L App | L |
|---|---|---|---|---|
| GK | (Georgian Soviet Socialist Republic) Mamuka Abuseridze | 27 | 38 | – |
| GK | (Georgian Soviet Socialist Republic) Avtandil Kantaria | 34 | 6 | – |
| DF | (Georgian Soviet Socialist Republic) Enriko Berishvili | 18 | 3 | 0 |
| DF | (Georgian Soviet Socialist Republic) Bagrat Chaduneli | 23 | 2 | 0 |
| DF | (Georgian Soviet Socialist Republic) Badri Danelia | 27 | 40 | 0 |
| DF | (Georgian Soviet Socialist Republic) Temur Kabisashvili | 22 | 31 | 0 |
| DF | (Georgian Soviet Socialist Republic) Murtaz Khurtsilava | 32 | 1 | 0 |
| DF | (Russian Soviet Federative Socialist Republic) Sergey Kuznetsov | 29 | 23 | 0 |
| DF | (Ukrainian Soviet Socialist Republic) Mykhaylo Olefirenko | 29 | 42 | 0 |
| DF | (Georgian Soviet Socialist Republic) Gocha Tkebuchava | 26 | 35 | 0 |
| DF | (Georgian Soviet Socialist Republic) Davit Tsomaia | 22 | 42 | 1 |
| DF | (Georgian Soviet Socialist Republic) Davit Sanikidze | 24 | 1 | 0 |
| MF | (Georgian Soviet Socialist Republic) Levan Baratashvili | 25 | 16 | 1 |
| MF | (Georgian Soviet Socialist Republic) Merab Jordania | 29 | 39 | 25 |
| MF | (Georgian Soviet Socialist Republic) Otar Korgalidze | 29 | 38 | 6 |
| MF | (Georgian Soviet Socialist Republic) Merab Tevzadze | 25 | 27 | 2 |
| FW | (Russian Soviet Federative Socialist Republic) Aleksandr Dozmorov | 27 | 37 | 10 |
| FW | (Georgian Soviet Socialist Republic) Gia Guruli | 25 | 40 | 18 |
| FW | (Ukrainian Soviet Socialist Republic) Viktor Khlus | 31 | 1 | 0 |
| FW | (Georgian Soviet Socialist Republic) Mikheil Meskhi | 28 | 10 | 2 |
| FW | (Georgian Soviet Socialist Republic) Besik Pridonashvili | 28 | 41 | 10 |
| FW | (Georgian Soviet Socialist Republic) Davit Ugrelidze | 25 | 23 | 3 |

=== Soviet Cup ===
| 2 May 1989 1st round | Zvezda | 2–3 (a.e.t.) | Guria | Perm |
| | Dyomin 88'; Yudin 103' | | Pridonashvili 68; Korgalidze 92'; Guruli 108' | Attendance: 4,100 |

| 1 June 1989 2nd round | Guria | w/o | Irtysh | Lanchkhuti |

| 29 June 1989 3rd round, 1st leg | Guria | 1–0 | Shakhtyor Donetsk | Lanchkhuti |
| | Jordania 88' (pen.) | | | Attendance: 16,000 |

| 17 July 1989 3rd round, 2nd leg | Shakhtyor | 4–2 | Guria | Donetsk |
| | Yashchenko 6'; Grachov 27'; Leonov 40'; Petrov 64' | | Ugrelidze 18'; Korgalidze 87' | Attendance: 5,000 |
