= Levan Baratashvili =

Georgian footballer

Personal information
- Date of birth: 24 November 1964
- Place of birth: Chiatura, Georgian SSR
- Date of death: 22 August 2016 (aged 51)
- Height: 1.76 m (5 ft 9 1/2 in)
- Position: Midfielder

Youth career
- Chiatura Sport School

Senior career*
Years	Team	Apps	(Gls)
1981–1985	Dinamo Tbilisi	19	(0)
1986	Torpedo Kutaisi	20	(3)
1987–1988	Dinamo Batumi	44	(9)
1988	Guria	13	(3)
1989	Metalurgi Rustavi	14	(1)
1989–1991	Guria	48	(1)
1991	Kakheti		
1992	Guria	21	(1)
1992	Vestmannaeyjar		
1993	Kakheti	9	(3)
- * Club domestic league appearances and goals

Levan Baratashvili (Georgian: ლევან ბარათაშვილი, 24 November 1964 – 22 August 2016) was a Georgian football player who played as a midfielder.

Known as a technical, fast and creative footballer, he has won the national cup and league silver medals with Guria.

== Career ==
Baratashvili started playing football at Chiatura's youth sport school where his father Zurab worked as one of the coaches. He joined the reserve team of Dinamo Tbilisi at the age of 17 in 1981. Two years later, he made a debut in the Soviet Top League. Overall, Baratashvili took part in 28 games for the senior team.

In 1986, Baratashvili moved to Torpedo Kutaisi where he opened his goal-scoring account in the top flight. After their relegation at the end of the season, Baratashvili signed with 2nd division club Dinamo Batumi. He featured in 44 league matches, scoring nine times.

After several of months spent at Metalurgi Rustavi, Baratashvili became a member of Guria in 1988. On 29 May 1988, he bagged a brace to seal a 2–1 win over Kolos. A year later, Baratashvili made 16 appearances for Guria who gained promotion to the top division.

After the Umaglesi Liga was launched in 1990, Baratashvili played three seasons for Guria. He was a member of the squad which won the first cup tournament and twice in a row finished as the league runners-up.

Baratashvili also had two spells at Kakheti and Icelandic club Vestmannaeyjar before announcing retirement in 1993.

Later Baratashvili worked at the Georgian Football Federation where he coached national youth teams along with Otar Korgalidze.

== Honours ==
Guria

- Georgian Cup: 1990
- Soviet First League runner-up: 1989
