= Khagba =

Khagba is a surname. Notable people with the surname include:

- Anri Khagba (born 1992), Russian footballer
- Beslan Khagba (born 1956), Abkhazian politician
- Kesou Khagba (born 1950), Abkhazian politician
- Roman Khagba (born 1964), Georgian-Russian footballer
