= Badri Danelia =

Georgian footballer (born 1962)

Personal information
- Date of birth: 2 January 1962 (age 64)
- Place of birth: Gegechkori, Georgian SSR
- Height: 1.80 m (5 ft 11 in)
- Position: Defender

Youth career
- Gegechkori Sport School

Senior career*
Years	Team	Apps	(Gls)
1980	Dila		
1981	Locomotive Samtredia		
1982	Guria	17	(1)
1983	Dinamo Tbilisi	11	(0)
1984	Locomotive Samtredia	8	(0)
1985	Dinamo Batumi	18	(0)
1985	Dinamo Tbilisi	1	(0)
1986–1992	Guria	178	(4)
1992–1993	Kolkheti 1913	24	(2)
1993–1994	Guria	19	(1)
1994–1995	Kolkheti 1913	21	(0)
1995–1996	Optik	33	(5)
1996–1997	Lok-Altmark	33	(0)
1997–2004	Eisenhüttenstädter	173	(24)
2004–2011	Neuzeller 1922	56+	(23+)
- * Club domestic league appearances and goals as of 29 January 2026

Badri Danelia (Georgian: ბადრი დანელია, born 2 January 1962) is a retired Georgian professional footballer player who played as a right-back and spent his long-time career in Georgia and later in Germany.

Danelia was a key player at Guria when the latter achieved its biggest success between 1986 and 1992. He is the winner of the first Georgian Cup tournament held in 1990. He has also twice won the league silver medals.

== Career ==
Danelia studied at Gegechkori Sport School. At age 18, he moved to third-tier club Dila. In 1982, Danelia joined Guria in the 2nd division and a year later signed with Dinamo Tbilisi where he made eleven top-flight appearances. In 1986, he returned to Guria to stay for seven successive trophy-laden seasons. In his first year, Danelia played 43 out of Guria's 46 league matches, scoring an equalizer in a 4–2 home loss to Kuzbass. This season Guria managed to gain their first ever promotion to a top tier.

Danelia contributed with 40 appearances to Guria's another triumph three years later. Although the team lost the 1990 title race, it was Danelia, now the team captain, who lifted the national cup following an extra-time win over Tskhumi. At the end of this season, Danelia was named as the best right-back of the year together with Omar Tetradze. In the same year, he was called up to the national team who were about to play their first official game against Lithuania.

During his second spell, Danelia played 178 league games for Guria who, apart from the cup glory, finished as the league runners-up four times.

Later, in 1995, Danelia moved to Germany where he played for low-division sides before announcing retirement at 49.

In December 2025, when former player and later manager Merab Jordania announced his plans to purchase Guria, Danelia was named in the board of directors along with his other ex-teammates.

== Honours ==
=== Player ===
Guria

- Georgian Cup: 1990
- Umaglesi Liga runner-up: 1990, 1991
- Soviet First League runner-up: 1986, 1989
