= Gocha Gujabidze =

Georgian footballer

Personal information
- Date of birth: 7 July 1971 (age 55)
- Height: 1.85 m (6 ft 1 in)
- Position: Defender

Senior career*
Years	Team	Apps	(Gls)
1989	Dinamo Tbilisi	0	(0)
1990–1992	Guria Lanchkhuti	72	(1)
1992–1993	Alazani Gurjaani	17	(2)
1993–1994	Baia Zugdidi		
1994–1995	Samtredia	26	(0)
1995	Rostselmash Rostov-on-Don	13	(0)
1996–1997	Kodako Tbilisi	11	(0)
1997	TSU Tbilisi	3	(0)
1998	KSZO Ostrowiec Świętokrzyski	2	(0)
1998–1999	Dinamo Batumi	15	(0)
1999–2003	Merani-91 Tbilisi	75	(1)
2004	Guria Lanchkhuti		
2004–2005	Chikhura Sachkhere		

International career
1995	Georgia	1	(0)
- * Club domestic league appearances and goals

Gocha Gujabidze (Georgian: გოჩა გუჯაბიძე; born 7 July 1971) is a Georgian former professional footballer who played as a defender.
