= Giorgi Oniani =

Georgian footballer

Georgi Oniani
Personal information
- Full name: Giorgi Oniani
- Date of birth: 23 November 1983 (age 42)
- Place of birth: Tbilisi, Soviet Union
- Height: 1.84 m (6 ft 0 in)
- Position: Defender

Team information
- Current team: Samgurali (head coach)

Senior career*
Years	Team	Apps	(Gls)
2002–2005	Locomotive	86	(4)
2005–2006	Dinamo Batumi	15	(3)
2006–2007	Olimpi	20	(3)
2007	Sioni	24	(0)
2007–2008	Carl Zeiss	13	(0)
2008–2009	Spartak Nalchik	1	(0)
2009–2012	Zestaponi	96	(6)
2012–2013	Dila	20	(3)
2013	Torpedo	4	(0)
Total		279	(19)

International career
2004	Georgia U21	1	(0)

Managerial career
- 2018: Guria
- 2019: Dinamo Batumi 2
- 2022: Guria
- 2022–2023: Gareji
- 2023–2025: Gagra
- 2026–: Samgurali
- * Club domestic league appearances and goals

Giorgi Oniani (Georgian: გიორგი ონიანი; born 7 September 1983) is a Georgian retired football defender and manager, currently working as head coach of Samgurali.

== Career ==
Born in Tbilisi, Oniani began his career with Locomotive. He made a debut in a 5–0 away win over Margveti. In January 2006, he moved to Dinamo Batumi and after six months joined Olimpi. In January 2007, he transferred to Sioni, but stayed only half a year. Oniani then moved to German club Carl Zeiss in July 2007, He left Jena after one year and moved to Spartak Nalchik.

Oniani spent most successful time at Zestaponi, where he won four trophies, including the national league twice.

Torpedo Kutaisi was the last club he played for. On 10 April 2013, during a Georgian Cup quarterfinal game against Sioni Bolnisi, Oniani crashed into a protective pole for nets and lost consciousness. With his neck seriously injured, Oniani underwent three surgeries.

His managerial career began in 2018. After two spells at Guria, in September 2022 he took charge of Liga 2 side Gareji, but in June 2023, with the club under his guidance sitting on top of the table eight points clear in title race, the sides parted company.

On 1 August 2023, Oniani was appointed at Erovnuli Liga club Gagra as head coach. He left the team in October 2025.

On 18 January 2026, Samgurali announced that Oniani would be new manager of the team.

== Honours ==
- Umaglesi Liga winner (2): 2010–11, 2011–12
- David Kipiani Cup runner-up (1): 2011–12
- Super Cup winner (1): 2011–12
