= Temur Chkhaidze =

Georgian footballer (born 1955)

Teimuraz Chkhaidze
Personal information
- Date of birth: 2 January 1955 (age 71)
- Place of birth: Lanchkhuti, Georgian SSR
- Height: 1.81 m (5 ft 11 in)
- Position: Midfielder

Youth career
- 1972–1973: Tbilisi Football School

Senior career*
Years	Team	Apps	(Gls)
1974	Dinamo Tbilisi B		
1975	Guria		
1975–1976	Dinamo Tbilisi B		
1976	Guria		
1976	Dinamo Tbilisi B		
1977–1987	Guria	384	(56)

Managerial career
- 1988–1993: Guria (chairman)
- 1993–1994: Guria
- 1994: Dinamo Tbilisi
- 1996–2002: Locomotive (coach)
- 2003–2004: Mtskheta (coach)
- 2005–2007: Georgia U21 (coach)
- 2007–2011: Gagra (coach)
- * Club domestic league appearances and goals as of 27 January 2026

Teimuraz (Temur) Chkhaidze (Georgian: თეიმურაზ ჩხაიძე, born 2 January 1955) is a retired Georgian professional footballer player and coach.

He spent most of his career at Guria as its captain, becoming the Knight of Sport for his outstanding service in 2020.

== Career ==
=== Player ===
Chkhaidze took first steps as a midfielder at Lanchkhuti Sport School. At age 13, he moved to Tbilisi Football School and as a talented player, attracted interest from Soviet coaches who called him up to the national youth teams. In 1972, Chkhaidze was named as the best player of a youth tournament, being awarded by Ogoniok magazine. In 1973, he was a member and captain of the Soviet U17 team. Especially noteworthy was his performance at the youth tournament held near Donetsk where Chkhaidze scored a brace to help his team come from behind against North Korea. He regularly played for the U18 team as well during the 1974 season.

In the mid-1970s, Chkhaidze featured for the reserve team of Dinamo Tbilisi in three stints. In 1976, he returned to his hometown third-tier club Guria who succeeded in promotion to the First League three years later. As a captain, Chkhaidze played 278 league games for the team during the next seven seasons. In 1986, he contributed with eight goals in 44 league matches to Guria's another successful campaign which resulted in their historic promotion to the Soviet Top League.

Chkhaidze made 18 appearances in the top flight, scoring a goal against Dynamo Moscow in a 2–1 home win on 2 September 1987. As Guria failed to retain its place among the strongest clubs, he retired after this season at the age of 32.

Chkhaidze who played more than 400 official games for Guria across three leagues, is among several footballers who left an indelible mark on the club's legacy.

=== Coach ===
In 1988, Chkhaidze was appointed as the chairman of Guria, a position he held for almost six years. In 1993, he replaced Gigla Imnadze as the head coach. A year later, Chkhaidze took charge of Dinamo Tbilisi. Later, he worked at several other clubs as a manager or coach.

== Acknowledgment ==
Along with two other heroes of the 1986 season, Chkhaidze received the Knight of Sport award in 2020.

The Guria regional football association regularly organizes a youth tournament named after Temur Chkhaidze.

On 1 October 2012, Chkhaidze was elected as a member of Parliament from the Lanchkhuti single-mandate electoral district for a four-year period.

== Family ==
Temur Chkhaidze has a son, Levan Chkhaidze, who is one of the founders of Spaeri football club.

== Honours ==
=== Player ===
Guria

- Soviet First League runner-up: 1986
- Soviet Second League winner: 1979
- Soviet Second League runner-up: 1978

=== Individual ===
- The Knight of Sport award: 2020
