= Besik Pridonashvili =

Georgian footballer

Personal information
- Full name: Besik Pridonashvili
- Date of birth: 11 March 1961 (age 65)
- Place of birth: Tbilisi, Georgian SSR, Soviet Union
- Height: 1.79 m (5 ft 10 in)
- Position: Forward

Youth career
- 1978–1979: Aviatori

Senior career*
Years	Team	Apps	(Gls)
1980–1981	Guria	22	(2)
1981–1982	Dinamo Tbilisi	0	(0)
1983–1984	Guria	69	(22)
1985	Dinamo Tbilisi	9	(0)
1986–1992	Guria	222	(75)
1992–1993	Alazani	18	(10)
1993–1994	Guria	22	(12)
1994–1995	Shevardeni 1906	24	(5)
- * Club domestic league appearances and goals

Besarion (Besik) Pridonashvili (Georgian: ბესიკ ფრიდონაშვილი; born 11 March 1961) is a Georgian retired football player who played as a forward.

During his 15-year career, Pridonashvili scored 122 goals in 386 league appearances, mostly for Guria. He is the winner of the Georgian Cup and two-time runner-up of the Umaglesi Liga.

== Career ==
Born in Tbilisi, Pridonashvili began his professional career at second-division club Guria. In his first season with the club in 1980, Pridonashvili scored once in twelve league appearances. Two years later, he moved to the reserve team of Dinamo Tbilisi.

After another two-year period with Guria, Pridonashvili returned to Dinamo in 1985 and made nine appearances in the Soviet Top League. A year later, the forward was signed again by Guria who were fighting for promotion in the First League. On 12 November 1986, in a crucial match held in Batumi, Pridonashvili scored a late winner against Lokomotiv Moscow to seal Guria's historic promotion. He finished the season as a joint topscorer with Vazgen Manasian.

During the remaining three seasons in the Soviet leagues, Pridonashvili took part in 103 official games, scoring 21 goals.

On 18 November 1990, Pridonashvili netted an extra-time winner in a Georgian Cup final against Tskhumi, making another historic achievement for Guria. He was also one of the leading players, making a vital contribution to Guria's second-place finish twice in a row in the national league.

Pridonashvili retired at the age of 34.

Later, until the mid-2020s, he was in charge of German non-league club FSV Rot-Weiß Breitungen for six years.

== Honours ==
- David Kipiani Cup winner: 1990
- Umaglesi Liga runner-up: 1990, 1991
- Soviet First League runner-up: 1986, 1989
