= 1976 Soviet Cup =

1976 Cup of USSR in Football
Кубок СССР

Tournament details
- Country: Soviet Union
- Dates: March 21 – September 3

Final positions
- Champions: Dinamo Tbilisi
- Runners-up: Ararat Yerevan

The 1976 Soviet Cup was an association football cup competition of the Soviet Union. The winner of the competition, Dinamo Tbilisi qualified for the continental tournament.

== Participating teams ==
Enter in second round	Enter in first round	
Vysshaya Liga 16/16 teams	Pervaya Liga 20/20 teams	Vtoraya Liga 6/111 teams
✓ Shakhter Donetsk; ✓ Dinamo Moscow; ✓ Torpedo Moscow; ✓ Ararat Yerevan; ✓ Karpaty Lvov; ✓ Dnepr Dnepropetrovsk; ✓ Dinamo Tbilisi; ✓ Zaria Voroshilovgrad; ✓ Spartak Moscow; ✓ Lokomotiv Moscow; ✓ Chernomorets Odessa; ✓ CSKA Moscow; ✓ Zenit Leningrad; ✓ Krylya Sovetov Kuibyshev; ✓ Dinamo Minsk ✓ Dinamo Kiev	✓ Pakhtakor Tashkent; ✓ SKA Rostov-na-Donu; ✓ Torpedo Kutaisi; ✓ Kairat Alma-Ata; ✓ Neftchi Baku; ✓ Nistru Kishinev; ✓ Tavriya Simferopol; ✓ Shinnik Yaroslavl; ✓ Spartak Ordzhonikidze; ✓ Pamir Dushanbe; ✓ Rubin Kazan; ✓ Spartak Ivano-Frankovsk; ✓ Metallurg Zaporozhye; ✓ Spartak Nalchik; ✓ Kuzbass Kemerovo; ✓ Kuban Krasnodar; ✓ Zvezda Perm; ✓ Daugava Riga; ✓ Terek Grozny; ✓ Kolkhozchi Ashgabat	✓ Yangier; ✓ Uralets Nizhniy Tagil; ✓ Amur Blagoveschensk; ✓ Krivbass Krivoi Rog; ✓ Dinamo Makhachkala; ✓ Žalgiris Vilnius

Source: []

Notes

- Instead of the second round, Dinamo Kiev started at quarterfinals.

== Competition schedule ==
=== First round ===
[Mar 21] 
AMUR Blagoveshchensk       1-0  Kuzbass Kemerovo 
  [N.Ostrovskiy. Att: 10,000] 
Daugava Riga               0-1  SKA Rostov-na-Donu       [in Sochi] 
  [Alexandr Rasputin 18 pen. Att: 2,000] 
KAYRAT Alma-Ata            1-0  Spartak Orjonikidze      [in Chimkent] 
  [Sergei Rozhkov 12] 
Krivbass Krivoi Rog        0-1  METALLURG Zaporozhye     [in Yalta] 
  [Yuriy Petrov 56. Att: 2,000] 
NEFTCHI Baku               2-1  Kolhozchi Ashkhabad      [aet] 
  [Nikolai Smolnikov, Bayram Durdyyev (K) og - Nuretdin Aliyev. Att: 10,000] 
NISTRU Kishinev            2-1  Rubin Kazan 
  [Igor Nadein pen, Yevgeniy Piunovskiy pen – Murat Zadikashvili. Att: 14,000] 
PAHTAKOR Tashkent          4-0  Dinamo Makhachkala 
  [Tulyagan Isakov, Viktor Churkin, Yevgeniy Zhukov, Boris Serostanov. Att: 20,000] 
Pamir Dushanbe             1-2  TORPEDO Kutaisi 
  [Valeriy Tursunov – Levan Nodia, Vladimir Shelia. Att: 13,000] 
SPARTAK Ivano-Frankovsk    2-0  Kuban Krasnodar 
  [Viktor Kozin 73, Mikhail Palamarchuk 78. Att: 6,000] 
TAVRIA Simferopol          3-0  Spartak Nalchik 
  [Valentin Prilepskiy 30, Nikolai Klimov 56, Nikolai Pinchuk 66. Att: 12,000] 
Terek Grozny               1-1  YANGIYER     [pen 4-5]   [in Mukachevo] 
  [Anatoliy Mikheyev – I.Budantsev. Att: 1,000] 
Uralets Nizhniy Tagil      1-2  SHINNIK Yaroslavl        [in Chkalovsk] 
  [V.Zamotayev – Nikolai Smirnov pen, Viktor Sanin. Att: 1,000] 
ZVEZDA Perm                3-1  Žalgiris Vilnius 
  [Vladimir Aleksandrov 20, Vladimir Solovyov 52 pen, Anatoliy Komkov ? – Kestutis Latoza 30 pen. Att: 12,000]

=== Second round ===
[Mar 27] 
DINAMO Moskva              1-0  Kayrat Alma-Ata          [in Nikolayev] 
  [Andrei Yakubik 39. Att: 12,000] 
DNEPR Dnepropetrovsk       2-0  Zvezda Perm              [in Simferopol] 
  [Sergei Malko 13, Pyotr Yakovlev 78. Att: 2,500] 
KARPATY Lvov               1-0  Pahtakor Tashkent 
  [Vladimir Dolbonosov (P) 74 og. Att: 10,000] 
Metallurg Zaporozhye       1-1  DINAMO Tbilisi           [pen 4-5] 
  [Gennadiy Degtyaryov 65 – David Kipiani 56 pen. Att: 25,000] 
Nistru Kishinev            0-1  TORPEDO Moskva 
  [Anatoliy Degtyaryov 40. Att: 18,000] 
Shinnik Yaroslavl          0-2  LOKOMOTIV Moskva         [in Andizhan] 
  [Alexandr Kozlovskikh 2, Alexei Ovchinnikov 89 pen. Att: 1,000] 
SKA Rostov-na-Donu         0-1  ARARAT Yerevan 
  [Khoren Oganesyan 79. Att: 10,000] 
Spartak Moskva             3-4  TAVRIA Simferopol        [aet]      [in Sochi] 
  [Valeriy Gladilin 21, 54, 75 pen – Vladimir Grigoryev 20, Yevgeniy Korol 73, 98, Valentin Prilepskiy 76. Att: 5,000] 
Torpedo Kutaisi            0-1  CSKA Moskva 
  [Alexandr Kolpovskiy 12. Att: 35,000] 
Yangiyer                   0-1  CHERNOMORETS Odessa 
  [Alexandr Pogorelov 60. Att: 10,000] 
ZENIT Leningrad            1-1  Spartak Ivano-Frankovsk  [pen 3-2]  [in Sochi] 
  [Georgiy Khromchenkov 15 – Stepan Chopei 1. Att: 5,000] 
[Mar 28] 
KRYLYA SOVETOV Kuibyshev   3-1  Dinamo Minsk             [in Sochi] 
  [Nikolai Pavlov 43, Viktor Filippov 58, Valeryan Panfilov 74 – Alexandr Prokopenko 48 pen. Att: 2,000] 
ZARYA Voroshilovgrad       2-1  Amur Blagoveshchensk 
  [Nikolai Pinchuk 51, Vyacheslav Semyonov 66 – R.Mkrtychev 17] 
[Mar 29] 
SHAKHTYOR Donetsk          1-0  Neftchi Baku     [aet]   [in Zhdanov] 
  [Vitaliy Starukhin 110. Att: 6,000]

=== Third round ===
[May 5] 
DINAMO Tbilisi             3-0  Zenit Leningrad 
  [Vakhtang Koridze 48, Alexandr Chivadze 49, David Kipiani 74. Att: 9,000] 
KARPATY Lvov               1-0  Krylya Sovetov Kuibyshev 
  [Yaroslav Kikot 27. Att: 22,000] 
Lokomotiv Moskva           0-1  ARARAT Yerevan           [aet] 
  [Nikolai Kazaryan 102. Att: 10,000] 
Zarya Voroshilovgrad       0-1  SHAKHTYOR Donetsk        [aet] 
  [Vyacheslav Golovin 93. Att: 15,000] 
[May 6] 
Tavria Simferopol          0-1  DNEPR Dnepropetrovsk 
  [Viktor Romanyuk 90. Att: 25,000] 
[May 12] 
CSKA Moskva                2-1  Torpedo Moskva 
  [Yuriy Saukh 76, Boris Kopeikin 90 - Vladimir Buturlakin 25. Att: 18,000] 
[May 27] 
Chernomorets Odessa        2-3  DINAMO Moskva            [aet] 
  [Vladimir Makarov 31, 118 pen – Andrei Yakubik 90, 108 pen, Alexandr Makhovikov 91. Att: 25,000]

=== Quarterfinals ===
[Jun 4] 
DNEPR Dnepropetrovsk    2-1  Dinamo Kiev 
  [Pyotr Yakovlev 24, 80 – Viktor Zvyagintsev 34. Att: 30,000] 
[Jun 12] 
DINAMO Tbilisi          2-1  Karpaty Lvov 
  [David Kipiani 43, Vakhtang Koridze 52 pen – Vladimir Danilyuk 17. Att: 35,000] 
[Jul 3] 
ARARAT Yerevan          2-1  CSKA Moskva 
  [Nikolai Kazaryan 27, Nazar Petrosyan 47 – Sergei Morozov 79. Att: 27,000] 
Dinamo Moskva           0-0  SHAKHTYOR Donetsk     [pen 2-3] 
  [Att: 25,000]

=== Semifinals ===
[Aug 30] 
ARARAT Yerevan          2-1  Dnepr Dnepropetrovsk 
  [Khoren Oganesyan 14, Arutyun Minasyan 19 – Sergei Malko 81. Att: 17,000] 
Shakhtyor Donetsk       0-2  DINAMO Tbilisi 
  [David Kipiani 13, Vladimir Gutsayev 73. Att: 40,000]

==== Final ====
3 September 1976

Dinamo Tbilisi	3 – 0	Ararat Yerevan
Kipiani 27'; Kanteladze 64' (pen.); Chelebadze 68'	Report

Lenin's Central Stadium, Moscow
Attendance: 45,000
Referee: Pavel Kazakov (Moscow)
