= Temur Kabisashvili =

Georgian footballer

Personal information
- Date of birth: 13 September 1967 (age 59)
- Height: 1.83 m (6 ft 0 in)
- Position: Defender

Senior career*
Years	Team	Apps	(Gls)
1985	FC Lokomotivi Tbilisi	20	(0)
1988–1992	FC Guria Lanchkhuti	98	(0)
1992–1993	FC Antsi Tbilisi		
1996–1999	FC Iriston Vladikavkaz	112	(1)
2000	FC Dynamo Barnaul	11	(0)

International career
1992	Georgia	1	(0)
- * Club domestic league appearances and goals

Temur Kabisashvili (born 13 September 1967) is a retired Georgian professional football player.
