= Roman Khagba =

Russian footballer

Personal information
- Full name: Roman Ochanovich Khagba
- Date of birth: 23 July 1964 (age 62)
- Place of birth: Gudauta, Georgian SSR
- Height: 1.78 m (5 ft 10 in)
- Positions: Midfielder; striker

Senior career*
Years	Team	Apps	(Gls)
1981–1982	FC Ritsa Gudauta		
1983–1984	FC Dinamo Sukhumi	54	(12)
1985–1986	FC Torpedo Kutaisi	53	(8)
1987	FC Guria Lanchkhuti	2	(0)
1987	FC Dinamo Sukhumi	16	(10)
1987	FC Dinamo Tbilisi	3	(0)
1988	FC Metalist Kharkiv	7	(0)
1988–1991	FC Dinamo Sukhumi	128	(47)
1992–1993	FC Zhemchuzhina Sochi	53	(13)
1993	→ FC Torpedo Adler	2	(0)
1994–1995	Malacca FA		
1996	FC Tekstilshchik Barysh		
1997	FC Dynamo-Zhemchuzhina-2 Sochi	2	(0)
1998	FC Lokomotiv-Taim Mineralnye Vody	8	(1)
- * Club domestic league appearances and goals

Roman Ochanovich Khagba (Russian: Роман Очанович Хагба; born 23 July 1964) is a former Georgian-Russian professional footballer.

== Club career ==
He made his professional debut in the Soviet Second League in 1983 for FC Dinamo Sukhumi.

== Honours ==
- Soviet Cup winner: 1988.
