= Davit Tsomaia =

Georgian footballer

Personal information
- Date of birth: 4 September 1967 (age 59)
- Height: 1.77 m (5 ft 9 1/2 in)
- Position: Defender

Senior career*
Years	Team	Apps	(Gls)
1985	FC Lokomotivi Tbilisi	5	(0)
1986	FC Dinamo Tbilisi	0	(0)
1987–1991	FC Guria Lanchkhuti	139	(5)
1992	Tampereen Kisa-Toverit (Finland)		
1992–1993	FC Alazani Gurjaani	26	(1)
1993–1994	FC Kolkheti-1913 Poti	21	(5)
1994–1996	FC Samtredia	24	(1)
1996–1997	Kodako Tbilisi	36	(1)
1997	FC WIT Georgia	13	(0)
1998	FC Metalurgi Rustavi	15	(0)
1998	TSU Tbilisi	15	(0)
1999	Ghartskali Dzveli Anaga	14	(0)
1999–2000	Gantiadi Kaspi	11	(0)
2000–2001	Samgori Gardabani	4	(0)

International career
1991–1992	Georgia	4	(0)
- * Club domestic league appearances and goals

Davit Tsomaia (born 4 September 1967) is a retired Georgian professional football player who made four appearances for the Georgia national team.
