= 1976 Soviet Second League =

Second League
- Season: 1976

1976 Soviet Second League was a Soviet competition in the Soviet Second League.

== Qualifying groups ==
=== Group I [Soviet republics] ===
Pos	Rep	Team	Pld	W	D	L	GF	GA	GD	Pts
1	GEO	Guria Lanchkhuti	38	21	10	7	67	34	+33	52
2	BLR	Dinamo Brest (Note: Bug Brest changed name to Dinamo.)	38	20	10	8	65	38	+27	50
3	LTU	Žalgiris Vilnius	38	20	6	12	67	31	+36	46
4	ARM	Shirak Leninakan	38	19	8	11	68	41	+27	46
5	GEO	Dila Gori	38	21	4	13	54	40	+14	46
6	GEO	Dinamo Batumi	38	18	9	11	44	31	+13	45
7	GEO	Dinamo Zugdidi	38	20	4	14	46	54	−8	44
8	AZE	Avtomobilist Baku	38	16	11	11	49	30	+19	43
9	BLR	Khimik Grodno	38	13	13	12	44	30	+14	39
10	LTU	Atlantas Klaipeda	38	14	9	15	37	41	−4	37
11	BLR	Mashinostroitel Gomel (Note: GomSelMash Gomel changed name to Mashinostroitel.)	38	14	8	16	44	48	−4	36
12	AZE	Progress Kirovabad	38	14	8	16	47	62	−15	36
13	GEO	Lokomotiv Samtredia	38	14	7	17	41	65	−24	35
14	MDA	Sperantsa Drokia	38	11	11	16	42	38	+4	33
15	BLR	Dvina Vitebsk	38	13	7	18	30	37	−7	33
16	LVA	Zvejnieks Liepaja	38	13	6	19	37	49	−12	32
17	ARM	SKIF Yerevan	38	11	10	17	36	61	−25	32
18	GEO	Magaroeli Chiatura	38	10	8	20	30	57	−27	28
19	BLR	Dnepr Mogilyov	38	8	9	21	34	60	−26	25
20	GEO	Metallurg Rustavi	38	8	6	24	28	63	−35	22

=== Group II [Central Asia] ===
Pos	Rep	Team	Pld	W	D	L	GF	GA	GD	Pts
1	UZB	Meliorator Yangiyer (Note: Yangiyer changed name to Meliorator Yangiyer.)	40	26	7	7	70	28	+42	59
2	UZB	Neftyanik Fergana	40	24	5	11	73	37	+36	53
3	KAZ	Tselinnik Tselinograd	40	20	11	9	54	34	+20	51
4	KGZ	Alga Frunze	40	18	14	8	61	31	+30	50
5	KAZ	Spartak Semipalatinsk	40	16	11	13	57	43	+14	43
6	KAZ	Shakhtyor Karaganda	40	19	5	16	49	41	+8	43
7	UZB	Zarafshan Navoi	40	15	11	14	51	50	+1	41
8	KAZ	Metallurg Chimkent	40	17	6	17	53	60	−7	40
9	KAZ	Vostok Ust-Kamenogorsk	40	12	15	13	51	47	+4	39
10	KAZ	Traktor Pavlodar	40	15	9	16	48	48	0	39
11	KAZ	Gornyak Nikolskiy	40	15	9	16	39	44	−5	39
12	UZB	Avtomobilist Termez	40	14	10	16	45	40	+5	38
13	KAZ	Khimik Jambul	40	14	10	16	57	53	+4	38
14	KAZ	Orbita Kzil-Orda	40	14	10	16	41	44	−3	38
15	UZB	Horezm Yangiaryk (Note: Hanki Yangiaryk changed name to Horezm.)	40	13	11	16	32	39	−7	37
16	KAZ	Aktyubinets Aktyubinsk	40	13	10	17	41	59	−18	36
17	UZB	Irrigator Jizak (Note: Jizak changed name to Irrigator Jizak.)	40	16	3	21	36	45	−9	35
18	UZB	Pahtachi Gulistan	40	13	8	19	39	51	−12	34
19	UZB	Dinamo Samarkand	40	14	5	21	38	49	−11	33
20	TJK	Hojent Leninabad	40	14	1	25	46	81	−35	29
21	UZB	Amudarya Nukus	40	7	11	22	28	85	−57	25

Source: rsssf.com

=== Group III [Central Russia] ===
Pos	Team	Pld	W	D	L	GF	GA	GD	Pts
1	Dinamo Leningrad	40	24	10	6	78	32	+46	58
2	Iskra Smolensk	40	22	10	8	67	31	+36	54
3	Lokomotiv Kaluga	40	21	10	9	48	30	+18	52
4	Avangard Kursk	40	19	12	9	46	37	+9	50
5	Volga Kalinin	40	21	7	12	57	37	+20	49
6	Novolipetsk Lipetsk	40	19	10	11	48	37	+11	48
7	Trud Voronezh	40	19	10	11	44	38	+6	48
8	Spartak Ryazan	40	19	9	12	49	34	+15	47
9	Baltika Kaliningrad	40	17	12	11	50	42	+8	46
10	Znamya Truda Orekhovo-Zuyevo	40	15	13	12	44	38	+6	43
11	Salyut Belgorod	40	15	13	12	45	41	+4	43
12	Textilshchik Ivanovo	40	17	8	15	65	52	+13	42
13	Dinamo Vologda	40	14	11	15	42	39	+3	39
14	Saturn Rybinsk	40	14	11	15	37	43	−6	39
15	Khimik Novomoskovsk	40	12	14	14	39	52	−13	38
16	Spartak Kostroma	40	10	9	21	52	63	−11	29
17	Electron Novgorod	40	8	12	20	24	54	−30	28
18	Mashinostroitel Tula	40	6	12	22	26	57	−31	24
19	Sever Murmansk	40	8	6	26	33	68	−35	22
20	Spartak Oryol	40	7	8	25	35	73	−38	22
21	Dinamo Bryansk	40	5	9	26	28	59	−31	19

Source: rsssf.com

=== Group IV [Russian South] ===
Pos	Team	Pld	W	D	L	GF	GA	GD	Pts
1	Mashuk Pyatigorsk	40	28	7	5	60	21	+39	63
2	RostSelMash Rostov-na-Donu	40	29	4	7	70	32	+38	62
3	Dinamo Makhachkala	40	21	11	8	56	31	+25	53
4	Sokol Saratov	40	23	4	13	57	40	+17	50
5	Dinamo Stavropol	40	22	4	14	67	39	+28	48
6	Torpedo Togliatti	40	19	7	14	74	48	+26	45
7	Druzhba Yoshkar-Ola	40	17	9	14	41	51	−10	43
8	Metallurg Magnitogorsk	40	15	12	13	52	43	+9	42
9	Torpedo Vladimir	40	13	15	12	32	31	+1	41
10	Rotor Volgograd	40	16	8	16	58	60	−2	40
11	Druzhba Maykop	40	14	10	16	39	30	+9	38
12	Uralan Elista	40	13	12	15	35	52	−17	38
13	Torpedo Taganrog	40	12	11	17	39	45	−6	35
14	Volga Gorkiy	40	13	9	18	42	53	−11	35
15	Khimik Dzerzhinsk	40	14	6	20	34	41	−7	34
16	Volgar Astrakhan	40	12	8	20	38	51	−13	32
17	Dinamo Kirov	40	10	9	21	36	58	−22	29
18	Gazovik Orenburg (Note: Lokomotiv Orenburg changed name to Gazovik.)	40	11	7	22	41	65	−24	29
19	Volga Ulyanovsk	40	10	9	21	42	76	−34	29
20	Torpedo Volzhskiy	40	6	15	19	24	42	−18	27
21	Revtrud Tambov	40	8	11	21	28	56	−28	27

Source: rsssf.com

=== Group V [Siberia and the Far East] ===
Pos	Team	Pld	W	D	L	GF	GA	GD	Pts
1	UralMash Sverdlovsk	34	23	5	6	73	26	+47	51
2	SKA Khabarovsk	34	18	10	6	57	27	+30	46
3	Dinamo Barnaul	34	16	11	7	42	32	+10	43
4	Amur Blagoveshchensk	34	16	10	8	40	31	+9	42
5	Luch Vladivostok	34	14	11	9	48	33	+15	39
6	Chkalovets Novosibirsk	34	14	10	10	39	30	+9	38
7	Uralets Nizhniy Tagil	34	13	11	10	35	34	+1	37
8	Energiya Bratsk	34	14	7	13	41	38	+3	35
9	Zenit Izhevsk	34	15	5	14	37	36	+1	35
10	Angara Angarsk	34	12	9	13	33	36	−3	33
11	Selenga Ulan-Ude	34	12	9	13	43	49	−6	33
12	Zvezda Irkutsk (Note: Aviator Irkutsk changed name to Zvezda.)	34	11	10	13	54	53	+1	32
13	Neftyanik Tyumen	34	12	6	16	44	52	−8	30
14	Avtomobilist Krasnoyarsk	34	10	9	15	41	38	+3	29
15	Stroitel Ufa	34	10	5	19	34	51	−17	25
16	Lokomotiv Chita	34	5	12	17	20	55	−35	22
17	Irtysh Omsk	34	6	9	19	34	56	−22	21
18	Torpedo Tomsk	34	7	7	20	23	61	−38	21

Source: rsssf.com

=== Group VI (Ukraine) ===
Pos	Team	Pld	W	D	L	GF	GA	GD	Pts	Promotion
1	Kryvbas Kryvyi Rih (C, P)	38	22	9	7	60	22	+38	53	Promoted
2	Metalist Kharkiv	38	19	8	11	51	29	+22	46	
3	SKA Odessa	38	16	13	9	46	33	+13	45	
4	Sudnobudivnyk Mykolaiv	38	16	12	10	43	32	+11	44	
5	Krystal Kherson	38	14	15	9	36	24	+12	43	
6	Avtomobilist Zhytomyr	38	14	14	10	44	31	+13	42	
7	Zirka Kirovohrad	38	18	6	14	42	34	+8	42	
8	Kolos Nikopol	38	15	9	14	36	42	−6	39	
9	SC Lutsk	38	11	16	11	34	34	0	38	
10	Khvylya Khmelnytskyi	38	14	8	16	34	34	0	36	
11	SC Chernihiv	38	12	11	15	36	44	−8	35	
12	Lokomotyv Vinnytsia	38	12	11	15	38	47	−9	35	
13	Hoverla Uzhhorod	38	14	7	17	26	38	−12	35	
14	Bukovyna Chernivtsi	38	11	12	15	29	34	−5	34	
15	Avanhard Rovno	38	13	8	17	31	41	−10	34	
16	Kolos Poltava	38	12	9	17	38	44	−6	33	
17	Novator Zhdanov	38	10	13	15	36	52	−16	33	
18	Frunzenets Sumy	38	11	11	16	40	57	−17	33	
19	Shakhtar Horlivka	38	11	10	17	36	45	−9	32	
20	Atlantyka Sevastopol	38	11	6	21	42	61	−19	28	Avoided relegation

(C) Champions; (P) Promoted

== Promotion playoffs ==
[Nov 1, 5]
Guria Lanchkhuti     0-0 0-2  URALMASH Sverdlovsk 
Meliorator Yangiyer  1-1 2-3  DINAMO Leningrad 
Mashuk Pyatigorsk    1-0 0-2  Krivbass Krivoi Rog

=== Additional finals ===
[Nov 11]
KRIVBASS Krivoi Rog  3-0 Mashuk Pyatigorsk [in Simferopol]
