= Merab Jordania =

Georgian footballer (born 1960)

Personal information
- Date of birth: 3 September 1960 (age 66)
- Place of birth: Tbilisi, Georgian SSR
- Height: 1.84 m (6 ft 0 in)
- Position: Midfielder

Youth career
- Dinamo Tbilisi

Senior career*
Years	Team	Apps	(Gls)
1980–1981	Dinamo Tbilisi	0	(0)
1982–1983	FC Torpedo Kutaisi	18	(0)
1984–1987	Dinamo Tbilisi	22	(0)
1988–1990	Guria Lanchkhuti	78	(44)
1990	FC Shevardeni-1906 Tbilisi	2	(1)
1992	Stjarnan	5	(1)

Managerial career
- 2003: Georgia
- * Club domestic league appearances and goals

Merab Jordania (Georgian: მერაბ ჟორდანია; born 3 September 1965), is a Georgian former professional footballer who played as a midfielder. He is the owner and chairman of Maltese football club Valletta FC.

== Club career ==
Jordania was born in Tbilisi. During his career he played for Dinamo Tbilisi (1980–81, 1984–87), Torpedo Kutaisi (1982–1983) and FC Guria Lanchkhuti (1988–90).

== Managerial and presidential career ==
Later, in 1998-2005 he was the president of Georgian Football Federation. In 2003, he was one of the temporary managers of Georgia national football team.

=== Vitesse Arnhem ===
In August 2010, he bought financially troubled Vitesse Arnhem. There were rumors that this purchase was engineered by Chelsea owner Roman Abramovich. He followed up by acquiring the services of new players and replacing manager Theo Bos with the inexperienced Albert Ferrer, a former Spanish international defender. In 2013, Jordania appointed Peter Bosz, who left the club in January 2015. In 2016, Henk Fraser was appointed manager of the Vitesse first team.

Preceded by Nodar Akhalkatsi	Presidents of GFF; 1998–2005	Succeeded by Nodar Akhalkatsi Jr.
