= Gigla Imnadze =

Georgian footballer (born 1955)

Personal information
- Date of birth: 10 June 1955 (age 71)
- Place of birth: Lanchkhuti, Georgian SSR
- Height: 1.75 m (5 ft 9 in)
- Position: Goalkeeper

Team information
- Current team: Guria (assistant head coach)

Senior career*
Years	Team	Apps	(Gls)
1972–1974	Guria		
1975–1976	Dinamo Tbilisi	7	(0)
1977	Dinamo Batumi	24	(0)
1978–1980	Guria	73	(0)
1981–1982	Dinamo Tbilisi	10	(0)
1982–1987	Guria	106	(0)

Managerial career
- 1989–1990: Guria (assistant)
- 1990–1993: Guria
- 1993–1994: Kolkheti 1913
- 1994–1995: Guria
- 1996–1997: Guria
- 1997–1998: Gorda
- 1998: Georgia (caretaker)
- 1998–1999: Georgia U21
- 2011–2012: Guria
- 2015: Guria
- 2017: Guria
- 2024–2025: Guria
- 2026–: Guria (assistant)
- * Club domestic league appearances and goals as of 27 January 2026

Gigla Imnadze, (Georgian: გიგლა იმნაძე, born 10 June 1955) is a retired Georgian professional footballer player and coach. He spent most of his career at Guria, becoming the Knight of Sport for his outstanding service in 2020.

As head coach, Imnadze is the first winner of the Georgian Cup tournament. He has also guided Kolkheti 1913 to silver medals of the national league.

Currently he works as assistant head coach at Guria.

== Career ==
=== Player ===
Aged 17, Imnadze joined his hometown third-tier club Guria as a goalkeeper. After three seasons he moved to Dinamo Tbilisi and made seven appearances in the Soviet Top League. In 1977, Imnadze signed for Dinamo Batumi for one season. A year later, he returned to Guria who earned promotion to the 2nd division in 1979. Following another short-time tenure with Dinamo Tbilisi, Imnadze moved back to Guria to spend the last six seasons of his career there. He belongs to the "Golden Generation" of Guria who won historic promotion to the top flight in 1986.

Imnadze retired in 1987, after taking part in sixteen matches in the Soviet top division.

=== Coach ===
Two years later, Imnadze joined the coaching staff at Guria under manager Mykhailo Fomenko. The club succeeded in the second promotion the same year, although joined the newly formed Umaglesi Liga in 1990. Under Gigla Imnadze, Guria won the first Georgian Cup tournament organized after Georgia's withdrawal from Soviet Football as well as the league silver medals twice in a row.

Imnadze coached the team for four incomplete seasons before taking charge of Kolkheti 1913 in 1993 and leading them to a second-place finish. Later in 1997, he was appointed at Gorda.

In 1998, Imnadze was a caretaker coach of the Georgian national team for a friendly match against Azerbaijan.

Overall, he has had record-breaking seven stints as Guria's manager, the last one being in 2025. In January 2026, Imnadze became assistant manager under Gocha Tkebuchava.

== Honours ==
=== Player ===
Guria

- Soviet First League runner-up: 1986
- Soviet Second League winner: 1979
- Soviet Second League runner-up: 1978

=== Manager ===
Guria

- Georgian Cup: 1990

Kolkheti 1913

- Umaglesi Liga runner-up: 1993–94

=== Individual ===
- The Knight of Sport award: 2020
