= Vazgen Manasyan =

Tajikistani footballer (1958–2024)

Personal information
- Full name: Vazgen Ignatovich Manasyan
- Date of birth: 13 March 1958
- Place of birth: Stalinabad, Tajik SSR, USSR
- Date of death: 9 January 2024 (aged 65)
- Height: 1.78 m (5 ft 10 in)
- Position: Striker

Senior career*
Years	Team	Apps	(Gls)
1975–1979	Politekhnik Dushanbe		
1980–1992	Pamir Dushanbe	425	(123)
1992	Zenit Saint Petersburg	4	(0)
1992–1994	Vorskla Poltava	70	(19)
1995	FC Kolos Karapyshi		
1995	Nyva-Cosmos Myronivka	2	(0)
1996	Industriya Borovsk	19	(6)

International career
1992	Tajikistan	1	(0)

Managerial career
- 2003: Volochanin-Ratmir Vyshny Volochyok (assistant)
- 2003–2004: Volochanin-Ratmir Vyshny Volochyok
- 2005: Chernomorets Novorossiysk
- 2008: Stal Dniprodzerzhynsk
- 2011: Lokomotiv Tashkent
- 2013–2015: Tajikistan (assistant)
- * Club domestic league appearances and goals

Vazgen Ignatovich Manasyan (Russian: Вазген Игнатович Манасян; 13 March 1958 – 9 January 2024) was a Tajikistani professional football coach and a player.

== Club career ==
Manasyan made his professional debut in the Soviet First League in 1980 for Pamir Dushanbe.

== Coaching career ==
Between 2013 and 2015, Manasyan was the assistant head coach of Tajikistan.

== Death ==
Manasyan died on 9 January 2024, at the age of 65.

== Honours ==
- Soviet First League Golden Boot: 1986
