= Georgian Football Federation =

Governing body of football in Georgia

UEFA
- Founded: 1936; 90 years ago (Soviet Union), 1990; 36 years ago (Georgia)
- Headquarters: Tbilisi
- FIFA affiliation: 1992
- UEFA affiliation: 1992
- President: Levan Kobiashvili
- Website: https://gff.ge

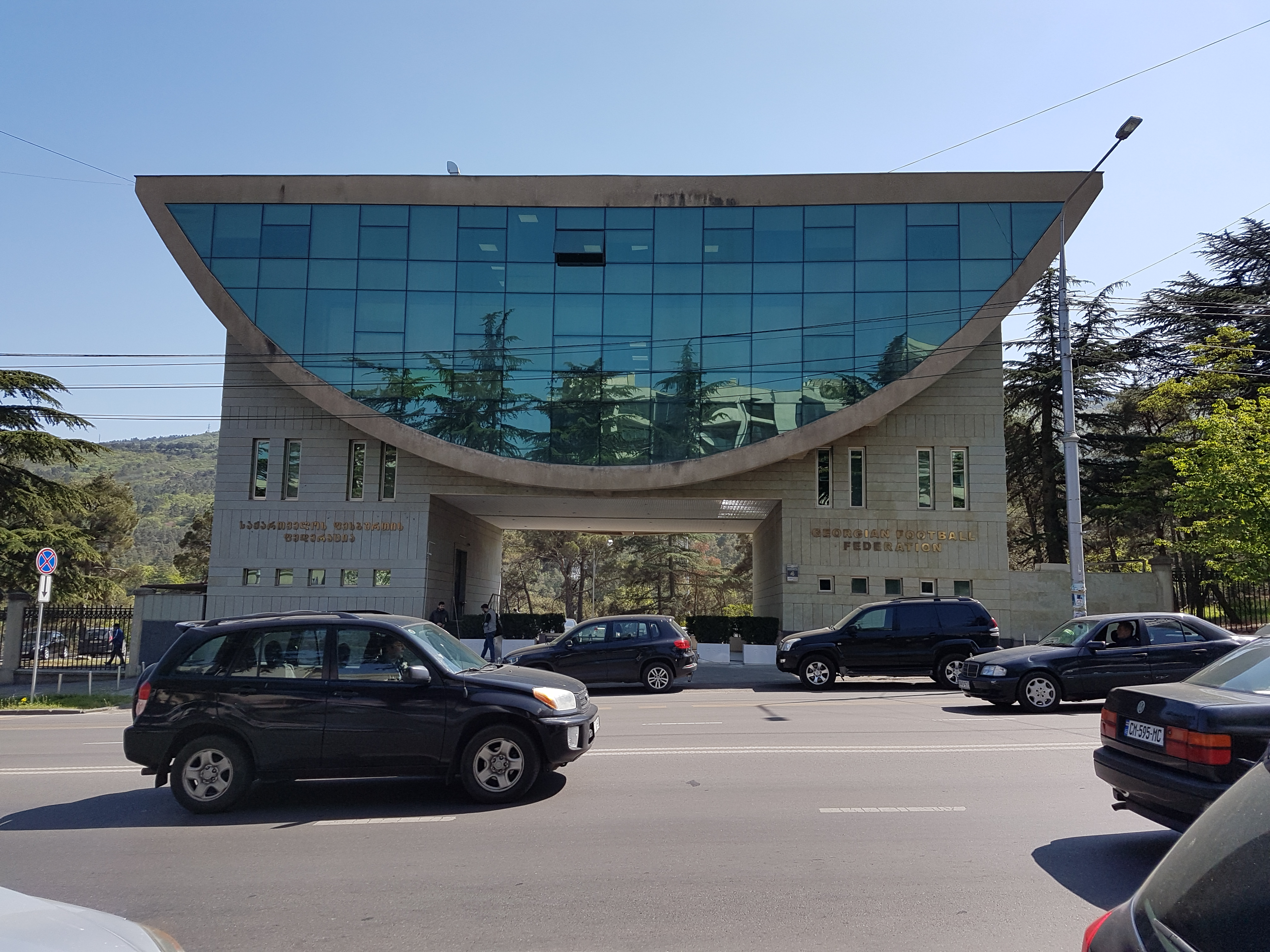
GFF headquarters in Tbilisi, Georgia.

Flag of the GFF.

The Georgian Football Federation (abbr. GFF; Georgian: საქართველოს ფეხბურთის ფედერაცია, sakartvelos pekhburtis pederatsia) was founded in 1936. Based in Tbilisi, it was part of the Football Federation of the Soviet Union from 1936 to 1989. The Independent Georgian Football Federation was established on 15 February 1990. It is the governing body of football in Georgia. It organizes the football league, the Erovnuli Liga, and the Georgia national football team.

== List of the presidents of the Georgian Football Federation ==
No.	Image	Name	Took office	Left office
1		Nodar Akhalkatsi	15 February 1990	17 September 1994
1		Nodar Akhalkatsi	17 September 1994	24 January 1998
2		Merab Zhordania	25 January 1998	24 August 2002
2		Merab Zhordania	24 August 2002	11 June 2005
3		Nodar Akhalkatsi Jr.	11 June 2005	13 May 2007
4		Georgi Nemsadze	13 May 2007	14 May 2007
3 (II)		Nodar Akhalkatsi Jr.	17 May 2007	17 September 2009
—		Revaz Arveladze (Acting)	17 September 2009	1 October 2009
5		Domenti (Zviad) Sichinava	1 October 2009	7 September 2015
—		Aleksandre Chivadze (Acting)	7 September 2015	3 October 2015
6 (I)		Levan Kobiashvili	3 October 2015	15 February 2019
6 (II)		Levan Kobiashvili	15 February 2019	4 February 2023
6 (III)		Levan Kobiashvili	4 February 2023	Incumbent

== Sponsors ==
- Bank of Georgia
- Paragraph Tbilisi
- Coca-Cola
- Macron

== See also ==
- Georgia women's national football team
- Georgia women's football championship
- Georgian Basketball Federation
