= 1986 Soviet First League =

Soviet First League
- Season: 1986
- Champions: CSKA Moscow
- Promoted: CSKA Moscow; Guria Lanchkhuti
- Relegated: Kuban Krasnodar; SKA Khabarovsk; Iskra Smolensk; Atlantas Klaipėda; Nistru Kishinev

The 1986 Soviet First League was the 47th season of the second tier of association football in the Soviet Union.

== Teams ==
- Demoted from the Soviet Top League: FC Fakel Voronezh and FC SKA Rostov/Donu.
- Promoted from the Soviet Second League: FC Rostselmash Rostov/Donu, FC Iskra Smolensk, and FC Atalantas Klaipėda.

== League standings ==
Note: 12 draws limit was applied during the season.

Pos	Team	Pld	W	D	L	GF	GA	GD	Pts	Promotion or relegation
1	(Russian Soviet Federative Socialist Republic) CSKA Moscow (C, P)	46	26	9	11	63	35	+28	61	Promotion to Top League
2	(Georgian Soviet Socialist Republic) Guria Lanchkhuti (P)	46	28	5	13	80	66	+14	61	Promotion to Top League
3	(Latvian Soviet Socialist Republic) Daugava Riga	46	24	14	8	82	46	+36	60 (Note: There was a limit for the draws earned, 12. Only twelve draws earn a point, in contrast, over the limit draws earn no points.)	
4	(Ukrainian Soviet Socialist Republic) SKA Karpaty Lviv	46	22	10	14	69	52	+17	54	
5	(Tajik Soviet Socialist Republic) Pamir Dushanbe	46	21	13	12	76	48	+28	54	
6	(Russian Soviet Federative Socialist Republic) Lokomotiv Moscow	46	21	11	14	63	48	+15	53	
7	(Russian Soviet Federative Socialist Republic) Rostselmash Rostov-on-Don	46	21	10	15	86	69	+17	52	
8	(Russian Soviet Federative Socialist Republic) Rotor Volgograd	46	22	7	17	69	56	+13	51	
9	(Ukrainian Soviet Socialist Republic) Kolos Nikopol	46	20	11	15	48	45	+3	51	
10	(Russian Soviet Federative Socialist Republic) Fakel Voronezh	46	20	8	18	56	44	+12	48	
11	(Georgian Soviet Socialist Republic) Dinamo Batumi	46	20	8	18	50	59	−9	48	
12	(Ukrainian Soviet Socialist Republic) Metalurh Zaporizhia	46	17	11	18	59	54	+5	45	
13	(Russian Soviet Federative Socialist Republic) Kuzbass Kemerevo	46	16	13	17	63	61	+2	44	
14	(Russian Soviet Federative Socialist Republic) Shinnik Yaroslavl	46	16	14	16	41	45	−4	44	
15	(Russian Soviet Federative Socialist Republic) SKA Rostov-on-Don	46	16	11	19	54	51	+3	43	
16	(Russian Soviet Federative Socialist Republic) Spartak Ordjonikidze	46	15	12	19	58	66	−8	42	
17	(Uzbek Soviet Socialist Republic) Pakhtakor Tashkent	46	15	10	21	55	73	−18	40	
18	(Russian Soviet Federative Socialist Republic) Dynamo Stavropol	46	14	15	17	66	58	+8	40	
19	(Armenian Soviet Socialist Republic) Kotayk Abovyan	46	14	13	19	46	54	−8	40	
20	(Russian Soviet Federative Socialist Republic) Kuban Krasnodar (R)	46	14	14	18	41	48	−7	40	Relegation to Second League
21	(Russian Soviet Federative Socialist Republic) SKA Khabarovsk (R)	46	12	12	22	49	61	−12	36	Relegation to Second League
22	(Russian Soviet Federative Socialist Republic) Iskra Smolensk (R)	46	11	13	22	30	60	−30	34	Relegation to Second League
23	(Lithuanian Soviet Socialist Republic) Atlantas Klaipėda (R)	46	9	11	26	40	75	−35	29	Relegation to Second League
24	(Moldavian Soviet Socialist Republic) Nistru Chisinau (R)	46	6	9	31	31	101	−70	21	Relegation to Second League

Source: RSSSF
(C) Champions; (P) Promoted; (R) Relegated

=== Match for 1st place ===
23 November 1986

CSKA Moscow (Russian Soviet Federative Socialist Republic)	2–0	(Georgian Soviet Socialist Republic) Guria Lanchkhuti
Kolesnikov 40'; S.Fokin 70' (pen.)	Report	(red card) 82' Danelia

Uzhhorod
Attendance: 7,200
Referee: Vladimir Kuznetsov (Omsk)

== Top scorers ==
#	Player	Club	Goals
1	Vazgen Manasyan	Pamir Dushanbe	27 (3)
1	Besik Pridonishvili	Guria Lanchkhuti	27 (6)
3	Aleksandrs Starkovs	Daugava Riga	22
4	Sergei Okunev	Rostselmash Rostov-na-Donu	21 (1)
4	Aleksandr Minayev	Fakel Voronezh	21 (3)
6	Aleksandr Gitselov	Rostselmash Rostov-na-Donu	19 (1)
6	Sergei Berezin	CSKA Moscow	19 (3)
6	Yevhen Shakhov	Metallurg Zaporozhye	19 (7)
9	Mukhsin Mukhamadiev	Pamir Dushanbe	18
9	Vyacheslav Lendel	SKA Karpaty Lvov	18
9	Genādijs Šitiks	Daugava Riga	18 (5)

== Number of teams by union republic ==
Rank	Union republic	Number of teams	Club(s)
1	RSFSR	13	CSKA Moscow, Lokomotiv Moscow, Rostselmash Rostov-na-Donu, Rotor Volgograd, Fakel Voronezh, Kuzbass Kemerovo, Shinnik Yaroslavl, SKA Rostov-na-Donu, Spartak Vladikavkaz, Dinamo Stavropol, Kuban Krasnodar, SKA Khabarovsk, Iskra Smolensk
2	Ukrainian SSR	3	SKA Karpaty Lvov, Kolos Nikopol, Metallurg Zaporozhye
3	Georgian SSR	2	Guria Lanchkhuti, Dinamo Batumi
4	Uzbek SSR	1	Pakhtakor Tashkent
4	Latvian SSR	1	Daugava Riga
4	Tajik SSR	1	Pamir Dushanbe
4	Armenian SSR	1	Kotaik Abovian
4	Lithuanian SSR	1	Atlantas Klapeida
4	Moldavian SSR	1	Nistru Kishinev

== See also ==
- Soviet First League
