= Gocha Tkebuchava =

Georgian footballer (born 1963)

Gocha Tkebuchava გოჩა ტყებუჩავა
Personal information
- Date of birth: 24 November 1963 (age 62)
- Place of birth: Tbilisi, Georgian SSR
- Height: 1.70 m (5 ft 7 in)
- Position: Defender

Team information
- Current team: Guria (head coach)

Youth career
- Dinamo Tbilisi

Senior career*
Years	Team	Apps	(Gls)
1982	Lokomotivi Tbilisi		
1982	Dinamo Tbilisi	0	(0)
1982–1983	Dynamo Moscow	26	(3)
1984–1987	Guria Lanchkhuti	132	(16)
1988	Dinamo Tbilisi	12	(1)
1988–1991	Guria Lanchkhuti	98	(4)
1991–1992	Dinamo Tbilisi	19	(0)
1992–1993	Ilves	42	(8)
1993–1994	Dinamo Tbilisi	1	(0)
1994–1995	Hapoel Ashdod	26	(8)
1995–1996	Hakoah Maccabi Ramat Gan	27	(7)
1996	Hapoel Ashkelon		(3)
1996–1997	Hakoah Maccabi Ramat Gan	17	(6)
1997	Maccabi Herzliya	5	(0)
1997–1999	Hakoah Maccabi Ramat Gan		(13)
1999–2000	Beitar Tel Aviv		(2)

International career
1994	Georgia	1	(0)

Managerial career
- 2001: Dinamo Tbilisi
- 2004: Georgia
- 2012: Baia Zugdidi
- 2014: Georgia U17
- 2017–2020: Pakhtakor Tashkent (assistant)
- 2026–: Guria
- * Club domestic league appearances and goals

Gocha Tkebuchava (Georgian: გოჩა ტყებუჩავა; born 24 November 1963) is a Georgian professional football coach and former player. He is currently the head coach of Liga 3 club Guria.

== Club career ==
Tkebuchava made his professional debut in the Soviet Second League in 1982 for Locomotive Tbilisi. He played one game in the UEFA Cup 1982–83 for FC Dynamo Moscow.

In 1983, Tkebuchava was called up to the Soviet national U21 team for the 1983 FIFA World Youth Championship held in Mexico, although he remained as an unused substitute. On 26 June 1994, he played for the Georgia team in a friendly game against Latvia.

== Managerial career ==
Dinamo Tbilisi was the first club Tkebuchava took over as head coach in 2001. Three years later, he was appointed at the national U21 team. Between 2008 and 2011, Tkebuchava worked as a coach at a football school in Spain. Later he worked at Baia Zugdidi, national U14 and U17 teams. From 2017 to 2021, Tkebuchava worked as assistant manager to Shota Arveladze at Uzbek club Pakhtakor Tashkent.

In early January 2026, Tkebuchava was appointed as head coach at Liga 3 side Guria.

== Honours ==
Guria Lanchkhuti

- Umaglesi Liga runner-up: 1990
