= FC Guria Lanchkhuti =

Guria Lanchkhuti
- Founded: 1924; 102 years ago as Kimi, 1960; 66 years ago as Guria
- Ground: Evgrapi Shevardnadze Stadium, Lanchkhuti, Georgia
- Capacity: 4,500 (3,030 seats)
- Owner: DMG Group
- Chairman: Zurab Okropiridze
- Head Coach: Gocha Tkebuchava
- League: Liga 3
- 2025: Liga 4, 3rd of 16 (promoted)
Home colours

FC Guria (Georgian: საფეხბურთო კლუბი გურია) is a Georgian association football club from Lanchkhuti. Following the 2025 season, they were promoted to Liga 3, the third tier of the national league.

Being one of the strongest Georgian teams in the late 1980s and early 1990s, Guria played in the Soviet Top league and also won the national cup. They later played fifteen seasons in the Umaglesi Liga, twice claiming silver medals.

The team plays their home matches at the Evgrapi Shevardnadze Stadium.

== History ==
=== Early period ===
Formed in 1924 as FC Kimi, the team ceased to exist after the start of World War 2 and resumed functioning in 1952 under the name "Kolmeurne", a Georgian word for the collective farm worker.

In 1960 the club was renamed as Guria. The next year they gained a first title by becoming champions of the republican league. During the subsequent decade the team won the Georgian Cup three times and the domestic league two more times, in 1966 and 1971, which enabled them to advance to the Soviet Association football.

=== 1972–79: in the Soviet second league ===
Starting from 1972 Guria played in the Second League, the third tier of the Soviet football league, for seven years.

In Second League after each season
YEAR	M	W	D	L	GF–GA	Pts	FP
1972	36	12	7	17	46-49	31	13th
1973	34	13	5	16	52-52	31	8th
1974	38	10	17	11	56-53	37	11th
1975	34	18	5	11	62-47	41	3rd
1976	38	21	10	7	67-34	52	1st*
1977	42	22	7	13	91-57	51	4th
1978	46	24	11	11	82-48	59	2nd
1979	46	31	4	11	110-50	66	1st

*Note: Lost promotion play-offs to Uralmash Sverdlovsk

Overall results shown by Guria in II League are the following:

M	W	D	L	GF–GA
314	151	66	97	566:390

Guria's remarkable progress was largely attributed to Shalva Kakabadze, who worked as head coach for record twenty years continuously from 1959 until 1980, and local government chairman Evgrapi Shevardnadze, brother of the Soviet Communist Party leader in Georgia Eduard Shevardnadze.

=== 1980–86: Road to the top flight ===
After the winning season in 1979, Guria were promoted to the First League, where they played for another seven consecutive years.

In First League after each season
YEAR	M	W	D	L	GF–GA	Pts	FP
1980	46	18	10	18	68-73	46	11th
1981	46	16	13	17	50-56	44	14th
1982	42	15	7	20	48-67	37	18th
1983	42	19	4	19	52-71	42	9th
1984	42	16	10	16	49-52	42	10th
1985	38	15	7	16	50-52	37	17th
1986	46	28	5	13	80-66	61	2nd ↑

The very fact of promotion to the Soviet Top League for the team representing a provincial town seemed amazing. Football fervour around Guria grew so high that in most cases not a single seat was available during their matches, and some youngsters would climb up trees around the stadium to watch their favourite team. A pitch invasion during a 2–1 win over fierce rivals Daugava Riga resulted in the disqualification of stadium for three matches. For this reason, the final home game of the season against Yuri Semin's Lokomotive Moscow (1–0) was held in Batumi in front of 20,000 spectators.

It happened so that the struggling Guria that was almost relegated in the previous season managed to place 2nd soon after the native of Lanchkhuti, Eduard Shevardnadze became the Soviet foreign affairs minister.

Under head coach Begi Sikharulidze, some players especially contributed to this huge achievement. Besik Pridonashvili shone with 27 goals in 46 games, becoming a shared top goalscorer of the season.

=== 1987: the Top League ===
Straight away after the promotion the football ground underwent a significant reconstruction and eventually the capacity of stadium in a town with 9,021 residents as of 1987 reached 22,000.

Between the 1983–84 and 1987–88 seasons the USSR occupied a second place after Italy in UEFA ranking, therefore, the Soviet Top League was a tough challenge for Guria. Being regarded as a decent home team, Guria beat Kairat 2–0, Neftchi 1–0, Dinamo Minsk 2–1, Dinamo Moscow 2–1 and Ararat 2–0, also played goalless draws against Dinamo Kyiv, Dinamo Tbilisi and future bronze medal holders Zalgiris, although poor results in away games doomed the club for relegation.

=== 1988–89: Promotion battles ===
Guria did not succeed in a new promotion attempt, finishing in the 4th place in 1988, but the team still made headlines with a shock victory over Dinamo Kyiv (2–1) in the Cup 1/16 finals. The next year the Gurians once again displayed their powerful home run by winning all 21 games held in Lanchkhuti and earned a place in the Soviet Top League as runners-up of the 1989 season.

However, Guria were no longer destined to play again in the Soviet championship. On 15 February 1990, the Georgian Football Federation made a decision to break away from the Soviet Football Federation, withdraw all the teams from the Soviet leagues and form its own national championship with immediate effect. When this issue was put forward at Guria, most of the players defied the decision made by their board of directors in favour of the Soviet Top League and overwhelmingly voted to join the national league.

=== 1990–2010: Ups and downs ===
During the opening two seasons, Guria were the only team competing with Dinamo Tbilisi for top titles. They eliminated Dinamo 3–0 on aggregate from the semifinals and beat in-form Tskhumi with an extra-time goal scored by Pridonashvili in the 1990 cup final. Guria made history, becoming the first team to lift the national cup. Meanwhile, they finished twice in a row as runners-up of the league, losing the 1991 title contest by one point only. Midfielder Otar Korgalidze became the league topscorer for two successive seasons, netting 40 goals in the 1991–92 season alone.

In mid-1990s, Guria were plagued by poor form. After a bottom-four finish for four consecutive seasons, they suffered first relegation to tier 2 in 1999. To make things worse, the team failed to retain a place there in 2007 and fell to Meore Liga for one year. Their very name was subjected to changes, becoming Guria-Lokomotive-2 after the merger with Locomotive's reserve team in 2001, and Guria-2000 in 2008. In 2009 the team regained their popular name.

=== 2010s-2020s: Series of promotions and relegations ===
Guria's eleven-year wait for the top division came to an end in 2013. After winning 27 out of 33 games, the team finished on top of their Pirveli Liga group with a sixteen-point margin. A month before sealing promotion, Guria came close to knocking out Dinamo Tbilisi in the quarterfinals. After a goalless home draw, they leveled the score in the return leg but a late own goal dashed their hopes to progress on away goals.

For once Guria spent four seasons in the Umaglesi Liga up until 2016, when they were relegated following a playoff loss to 2015 champions Dila. A year later, the team dropped into the 3rd tier for the first time in ten years. As the club experienced another rapid decline in the late 2010s, 15 managers were replaced in a record-breaking thirty-month period. Although the team managed to go up for 2019, their tenure there did not last longer than one season.

Throughout the shortened 2020 season, Guria appeared poised for promotion. Yet, defeat to direct rivals in decisive last two games spelled failure for their main goal. In contrast, a year later the team mostly stayed inside the drop zone, although due to the points picked up close to the end, they barely escaped yet another relegation.

Guria reached a new low in 2024, when they finished at the bottom of the table and suffered relegation to Liga 4. But with staunch support of their fans at a crucial point, the team achieved an immediate return to Liga 3. In most dramatic circumstances, Guria had to twice cancel out a two-goal deficit, including with two injury-time goals, to snatch a vital point on the final day of the 2025 season and earn first promotion in seven years.

After this season the club was purchased by the family of its former captain and topscorer Merab Jordania. With coach Gocha Tkebuchava at the helm and several experienced players added to the squad, Guria joined the 3rd division title race from the beginning, securing an automatic promotion to Liga 2 with three games to spare.

== Statistics ==
Seasons spent in Georgian leagues since 1990:

- Umaglesi Liga (1st tier): 15
- Pirveli Liga / Erovnuli Liga 2 (2nd tier): 14
- Meore Liga / Liga 3 (3rd tier): 8
- Liga 4 (4th tier): 1

Correct up to 2026 season

== Club honours ==
=== Leagues ===
==== Soviet period ====
- Soviet First League: (level 2)
- Soviet Second League: (level 3)
  - Winners: 1976, 1979
  - Runners-up: 1986, 1989
- Georgian Soviet Championship: (level 4)
  - Winners: 1961, 1966, 1971
  - Runners-up: 1960

==== Georgia ====
- Umaglesi Liga (level 1)
  - Runners-up: 1990, 1991
- Pirveli Liga: (level 2)
  - Winners: 2000–01, 2012–13 (West)
- Meore Liga/Liga 3: (level 3)
  - Runners-up: 2007–08

=== Cups ===
- Georgian Soviet Cup:
  - Winners: 1965, 1966, 1971
- Georgian Cup:
  - Winners: 1990

== Personal honours ==
- (Georgia (country)) Otar Korghalidze – Top scorers – 14 goals, 1991 season
- (Georgia (country)) Otar Korghalidze – Top scorers – 40 goals, 1991–92 season
- (Georgia (country)) Zviad Endeladze – European Golden Boot – 40 goals, 1995–96 season (for Margveti Zestaponi)

In early 2020, by decree of the Georgian Ministry of Sport Begi Sikharulidze, Teimuraz Chkhaidze and Gigla Imnadze were awarded the Knight of Sport title for their distinguished contribution to Guria's victorious season in 1986.

A year later Begi Sikharulidze was awarded the title Honorary Citizen of Lanchkhuti.

== Current squad ==
As of 19 March 2026

Note: Flags indicate national team as defined under FIFA eligibility rules; some limited exceptions apply. Players may hold more than one non-FIFA nationality.

No.	Pos.	Nation	Player
1	GK	GEO	Levan Isiani
2	DF	GEO	Levan Kakubava (C)
4	DF	GEO	Nika Kokaia
6	MF	GEO	Nikoloz Nozadze
7	MF	GEO	Kakha Kakhabrishvili
8	DF	GEO	Davit Maisashvili
9	FW	GEO	Tornike Kapanadze
10	MF	GEO	Data Sitchinava
11	FW	GEO	Vano Sharvadze
14	DF	GEO	Tsotne Chotalishvili
16	DF	GEO	Davit Gogichaishvili

No.	Pos.	Nation	Player
19	DF	GEO	Davit Kikalishvili
20	MF	GEO	Davit Gambarovi
21	FW	GEO	Teimuraz Sharashenidze
23	MF	GEO	Kichi Meliava
24	DF	GEO	Nodar Iashvili
25	DF	GEO	Ioane Tabatadze
27	DF	GEO	Luka Chaganava
30	DF	GEO	Ivane Okropiridze
32	GK	GEO	Rezo Lomidze
33	DF	GEO	Luka Kokosadze
40	MF	GEO	Nika Kokaia
—	MF	GEO	Vano Tsilosani

== Management ==
Position	Name
Chairman	Zurab Okropiridze
Sports director	Andro Nemsadze
Head coach	Gocha Tkebuchava
Assistant coach	Gigla Imnadze
Assistant coach	Temur Loria
Assistant coach	Gia Chkhaidze
Goalkeeping coach	Irakli Khvedelidze

== Topscorers by season ==
Season	Name	Goals
1966–67	(Georgia (country)) Omar Pertenava	16
1967–68	(Georgia (country)) Vakhtang Dzidziguri	23
1968–69	(Georgia (country)) Vakhtang Dzidziguri	17
1969–70	(Georgia (country)) Vakhtang Dzidziguri	18
1970–71	(Georgia (country)) Vakhtang Dzidziguri	39
1971–72	(Georgia (country)) Vakhtang Dzidziguri	13
1972–73	(Georgia (country)) Joni Abaishvili	19
1973–74	(Georgia (country)) Vakhtang Dzidziguri	15
1974–75	(Georgia (country)) Revaz Sanaia	25
1975–76	(Georgia (country)) Besik Mchedlishvili	20
1976–77	(Moldova) Vasil Troian	18
1977–78	(Moldova) Vasil Troian	15
1978–79	(Georgia (country)) Merab Megreladze	26
1979–80	(Georgia (country)) Merab Megreladze	20
1980–81	(Georgia (country)) Merab Megreladze	11
1981–82	(Georgia (country)) Temur Ebanoidze	9
1982–83	(Georgia (country)) Murtaz Akophiani	14
1983–84	(Georgia (country)) Vakhtang Kopaleishvili	13
1984–85	(Georgia (country)) Gia Tkebuchava	11
1985–86	(Georgia (country)) Besik Pridonashvili	27
1986–87	(Ukraine) Viktor Khlus	5
1987–88	(Ukraine) Viktor Khlus	21
1988–89	(Georgia (country)) Merab Zhordania	25
1989–90	(Georgia (country)) Otar Korghalidze	21
1990–91	(Georgia (country)) Otar Korghalidze	14
1991–92	(Georgia (country)) Otar Korghalidze	40

== Managerial history ==
Name	Coun.	From	To
Givi Imnaishvili	(Soviet Union)	1952	1953
Vladimer Narimanidze	(Soviet Union)	1954	1955
Viktor Berezhnoi	(Soviet Union)	1956	1956
Boris Chitaia	(Soviet Union)	1957	1958
Shalva Kakabadze	(Soviet Union)	1959	1979
Aleksandre Kotrikadze	(Soviet Union)	1980	1980
Murtaz Khurtsilava	(Soviet Union)	1981	1982
Shalva Kakabadze (2)	(Soviet Union)	1983	1984
Begi Sikharulidze	(Soviet Union)	1985	1986
Aleksandre Kotrikadze (2)	(Soviet Union)	1986	1986
Mykhailo Fomenko	(Soviet Union)	1987	1989
Murtaz Khurtsilava (2)	(Georgia (country))	1990	1990
Gigla Imnadze	(Georgia (country))	1990	1993
Temur Chkhaidze	(Georgia (country))	1993	1994
Gigla Imnadze (2)	(Georgia (country))	1994	1995
Begi Sikharulidze (2)	(Georgia (country))	1995	1996
Boris Dudarov	(Russia)	1996	1996
Gigla Imnadze (3)	(Georgia (country))	1996	1997
Gia Tavadze	(Georgia (country))	1997	1997
Avtandil Nariashvili	(Georgia (country))	1997	1997
Begi Sikharulidze	(Georgia (country))	1997	1997
Joni Janelidze	(Georgia (country))	1998	1998
Avtandil Nariashvili (2)	(Georgia (country))	1998	1999
Shota Pataraia	(Georgia (country))	1999	2000
Zaza Gurielidze	(Georgia (country))	2000	2001
Gubaz Dolidze	(Georgia (country))	2001	2001
Samson Pruidze	(Georgia (country))	2001	2001
Imedo Dundua	(Georgia (country))	2001	2001
Avtandil Nariashvili (3)	(Georgia (country))	2001	2001
Ramaz Pirtskhalaishvili	(Georgia (country))	2001	2003
Temur Loria	(Georgia (country))	2004	2007
Zviad Endeladze	(Georgia (country))	2007	2007
Irakli Patsuria	(Georgia (country))	2008	2008
Avtandil Nariashvili (4)	(Georgia (country))	2008	2009
Kakha Ebralidze	(Georgia (country))	2009	2009
Gia Chkhaidze	(Georgia (country))	2010	2010
Irakli Patsuria (2)	(Georgia (country))	2011	2011
Gigla Imnadze (4)	(Georgia (country))	2011	2012
Temur Loria (2)	(Georgia (country))	2012	2013
Davit Makharadze	(Georgia (country))	2013	2013
Roman Pokora	(Ukraine)	2013	2013
Davit Makharadze (2)	(Georgia (country))	2014	2014
Temur Loria (3)	(Georgia (country))	2014	2015
Gigla Imnadze (5)	(Georgia (country))	2015	2015
Kakha Gogichaishvili	(Georgia (country))	2015	2015
Badri Kvaratskhelia	(Georgia (country))	2015	2015
Gia Chkhaidze (2)	(Georgia (country))	2015	2015
Viktor Demidov	(Russia)	2016	2016
Temur Makharadze	(Georgia (country))	2016	2016
Oleh Leshchynskyi	(Ukraine)	2016	2016
Gigla Imnadze (6)	(Georgia (country))	2017	2017
Gia Guruli	(Georgia (country))	2017	2017
Davit Makharadze (3)	(Georgia (country))	2017	2018
Giorgi Oniani	(Georgia (country))	2018	2018
Giga Imedaishvili	(Georgia (country))	2018	2018
Tengiz Pataraia	(Georgia (country))	2019	2019
Giga Imedaishvili (2)	(Georgia (country))	2019	2019
Gela Sanaia	(Georgia (country))	2019	2019
Gia Chkhaidze (3)	(Georgia (country))	2019	2019
Temur Loria (4)	(Georgia (country))	2019	2020
Levan Khomeriki / Ivane Makharadze	(Georgia (country))	2020	2021
Giga Imedaishvili (3)	(Georgia (country))	2021	2021
Giorgi Oniani (2)	(Georgia (country))	2021	2022
Davit Digmelashvili	(Georgia (country))	2023	2023
Aleksandre Koshkadze	(Georgia (country))	2023	2024
Gigla Imnadze (7)	(Georgia (country))	2024	2025
Temur Loria (5)	(Georgia (country))	2025	2025
Gocha Tkebuchava	(Georgia (country))	2026	

== Rivalry ==
Mertskhali are considered to be Guria's bitter rivals. Initially, they were more or less on equal levels but their fixtures have become rare due to a significant advantage achieved by Guria over the last three decades.
