= 2024 Erovnuli Liga 2 =

Georgian second tier football season

Erovnuli Liga 2
- Season: 2024
- Dates: 5 March – 8 December
- Champions: Gareji (1st title)
- Promoted: Gareji
- Relegated: Aragvi; Shturmi; WIT Georgia; Kolkheti
- Conference League: Spaeri
- Matches: 180
- Goals: 528 (2.93 per match)
- Top goalscorer: Levan Papava (27 goals)
- Biggest home win: Sioni 7–0 Kolkheti (2 November)
- Biggest away win: Spaeri 0–5 Locomotive (10 August); Kolkheti 0–5 Rustavi (9 November)
- Highest scoring: Aragvi 3–5 Gareji (1 May); Aragvi 6–2 WIT Georgia (24 May)
- Longest winning run: Gareji (4 games)
- Longest unbeaten run: Gareji (10)
- Longest winless run: Kolkheti (11)
- Longest losing run: Kolkheti (7)
- All statistics correct as of complete.

The 2024 Erovnuli Liga 2 season was the eighth edition under its current title and the 36th edition of second-tier football in Georgia. The four-part competition began on 5 March and ended on 8 December with playoffs completed on 16 December.

Each team played 36 matches this season. The winners Gareji gained automatic promotion to the Erovnuli Liga, while the next two teams participate in play-offs against their top-flight rivals. The bottom two entered a play-off contest against 3rd and 4th teams of Liga 3 at the end of the season. Two-legged ties were played at each side's home ground.

== Team changes ==
The following teams have changed division since the 2023 season:

=== To Erovnuli Liga 2 ===
Promoted from Liga 3

• Aragvi • Shturmi • Rustavi

Relegated from Erovnuli Liga

• Shukura

=== From Erovnuli Liga 2 ===
Promoted to Erovnuli Liga

• Kolkheti 1913

Relegated to Liga 3

• Merani Martvili • Merani Tbilisi

Note: Shukura, relegated from the top league following the 2023 season, were supposed to be one of the ten clubs competing this season. However, based on a GFF decision announced on 11 January 2024, they were demoted to Liga 4 and replaced by Rustavi.

== Teams ==
Location of Liga 2 football clubs in 2024

Based on their performance in the previous year, the following ten teams are competing in Erovnuli Liga 2 in the 2024 season.

Rustavi, Kolkheti, Locomotive, Sioni and WIT Georgia have previously taken part in the main division with the last two clubs being also the national champions.

The clubs are listed in alphabetical order.

Club	Position last season	Location	Region
Aragvi	1st in Liga 3	Dusheti (Note: Although formally from Dusheti, played all their home matches at Sartichala stadium)	Mtskheta-Mtianeti
Dinamo-2	5th	Tbilisi	Tbilisi
Gareji	2nd	Sagarejo	Kakheti
Kolkheti	7th	Khobi	Samegrelo-Zemo Svaneti
Locomotive	8th	Tbilisi	Tbilisi
Rustavi	3rd in Liga 3	Rustavi	Kvemo Kartli
Shturmi	2nd in Liga 3	Sartichala	Kvemo Kartli
Sioni	4th	Bolnisi	Kvemo Kartli
Spaeri	3rd	Tbilisi	Tbilisi
WIT Georgia	6th	Tbilisi	Tbilisi

== League table ==
Pos	Team	Pld	W	D	L	GF	GA	GD	Pts	Promotion, qualification or relegation
1	Gareji (C, P)	36	19	10	7	77	44	+33	67	Promotion to Erovnuli Liga
2	Rustavi	36	20	5	11	62	41	+21	65	Qualification for Promotion play-offs
3	Sioni	36	19	4	13	66	42	+24	61	Qualification for Promotion play-offs
4	Locomotive	36	13	12	11	50	49	+1	51	
5	Spaeri	36	14	9	13	50	47	+3	51	Qualification for Conference League second qualifying round (Note: Spaeri qualified for the Conference League second qualifying round by winning the 2024 Georgian Cup.)
6	Dinamo-2	36	15	6	15	51	62	−11	51	
7	Aragvi (R)	36	14	7	15	51	50	+1	49	Qualification for Relegation play-offs
8	Shturmi (R)	36	12	9	15	42	49	−7	45	Qualification for Relegation play-offs
9	WIT Georgia (R)	36	11	8	17	49	59	−10	41	Relegation to Liga 3
10	Kolkheti (R)	36	4	8	24	30	85	−55	20	Relegation to Liga 3

Rules for classification: 1) Points; 2) Head-to-head points; 3) Head-to-head goal difference; 4) Head-to-head goals scored; 5) Head-to-head away goals scored (only if two teams); 6) Goal difference; 7) Goals scored.
(C) Champions; (P) Promoted; (R) Relegated

== Results ==
=== Regular season ===
==== Round 1-18 ====
Home \ Away	ARA	DT2	GAR	KKH	LOC	RST	SHS	SBL	SPA	WIT
Aragvi	—	3–2	3–5	3–3	3–1	1–2	1–1	2–1	1–2	6–2
Dinamo-2	3–1	—	1–1	4–1	1–1	2–1	3–1	2–1	0–0	2–0
Gareji	0–1	3–0	—	2–1	1–0	0–1	4–1	3–4	1–1	1–1
Kolkheti	2–1	0–1	0–0	—	2–2	2–0	2–1	0–0	1–4	1–1
Locomotive	2–1	2–4	4–1	3–3	—	1–1	1–1	2–4	1–0	0–1
Rustavi	1–0	4–1	2–3	1–0	0–0	—	4–1	3–1	3–1	4–1
Shturmi	1–0	0–1	1–1	5–0	1–2	1–1	—	1–0	0–3	2–1
Sioni	0–0	2–1	2–0	4–0	4–0	1–0	2–1	—	5–1	2–3
Spaeri	0–0	2–1	1–2	1–0	1–1	0–1	0–0	1–0	—	1–1
WIT Georgia	0–2	1–2	3–2	3–1	3–0	1–1	3–1	1–0	1–2	—

Source: Liga 2 results
Legend: Blue = home team win; Yellow = draw; Red = away team win.

==== Round 19-36 ====
Home \ Away	ARA	DT2	GAR	KKH	LOC	RST	SHS	SBL	SPA	WIT
Aragvi	—	1–0	1–3	2–1	1–1	1–1	1–1	1–2	2–0	1–0
Dinamo-2	1–3	—	2–2	0–1	1–2	0–2	3–2	3–2	0–4	2–1
Gareji	2–0	3–0	—	4–0	0–0	4–0	5–1	3–0	5–1	2–2
Kolkheti	1–1	2–0	2–2	—	2–1	1–0	2–0	3–1	2–0	0–1
Locomotive	1–0	1–1	1–2	2–1	—	4–1	0–2	2–1	1–1	1–1
Rustavi	3–0	5–0	2–1	4–2	0–1	—	1–0	1–0	2–1	1–3
Shturmi	2–1	4–2	1–1	1–0	2–1	2–0	—	0–1	1–0	0–0
Sioni	3–0	3–0	2–2	7–0	2–0	1–0	2–1	—	0–2	2–0
Spaeri	0–2	0–0	1–3	6–1	0–5	3–1	1–1	2–3	—	2–0
WIT Georgia	1–3	0–1	1–2	1–1	1–3	13–	1–0	4–2	1–3	—

Source: Liga 2 results
Legend: Blue = home team win; Yellow = draw; Red = away team win.

== Season statistics ==
=== Top scorers ===
As of 8 December 2024

Rank	Player	Club	Goals
1	(Georgia (country)) Levan Papava	Gareji	27
2	(Georgia (country)) Data Sitchinava	Sioni	21
3	(Georgia (country)) Amiran Dzagania	WIT Georgia	20
3	(Georgia (country)) Tengiz Bregvadze	Aragvi	20

=== Most assists ===
Rank	Player	Club	Assists
1	(Japan) Yuta Nakano	Rustavi	12
2	(Georgia (country)) Levan Barabadze	Spaeri	9
2	(Georgia (country)) Bachana Mosashvili	Gareji	9
4	(Georgia (country)) Data Sitchinava	Sioni	8

=== Clean sheets ===
Rank	Player	Club	Clean sheets
1	(Georgia (country)) Konstantine Sepiashvili	Sioni	12
2	(Georgia (country)) Bukhuti Putkaradze	Spaeri	11
3	(Georgia (country)) Giorgi Kutateladze	Aragvi	9

=== Discipline ===
Most red cards: 9

• Aragvi

Fewest red cards: 1

• Gareji

• Shturmi

== Promotion playoffs ==
12 December
13:00 GET

Sioni	1–1	Gagra
Makatsaria 44'; Mukbaniani (red card) 90+2'	Report	Tchamba 83'

Tamaz Stepania Stadium, Bolnisi
Referee: I.Kvirikashvili
16 December
18:00 GET

Gagra	2–2 (a.e.t.) (7–6 p)	Sioni
Gegetchkori (red card) 5'; Kimadze 52'; Nozadze 104' (o.g.)	Report	Rekhviashvili 45+2'; Tsirdava 94'

Davit Petriashvili Arena, Tbilisi
Referee: G.Kruashvili

12 December
18:00 GET

Telavi	2–1	Rustavi
Tsnobiladze 45+6' Georgijević 70'	Report	Jibril (red card) 22'; Kilasonia 85' (pen.)

Kavkasioni Arena, Telavi
Referee: G.Kikacheishvili
16 December
15:00 GET

Rustavi	1–1	Telavi
Nakano 12'	Report	Zhividze 116'

Technical Centre, Rustavi
Referee: A.Aptsiauri

== Relegation playoffs ==
12 December
13:00 GET

Iberia-2 1999	2–2	Aragvi
Khachidze 36' (pen.); G.Mamageishvili 70'	Report	Kukalia 32' (o.g.); Janelidze 85'

Bendela stadium, Tbilisi
Referee: A.Parjikia
16 December
13:00 GET

Aragvi	0–1	Iberia-2 1999
Bregvadze (penalty missed) 90+9'	Report	Khachidze 72' (pen.)

Central stadium, Sartichala
Referee: I.Kherkhadze

12 December
19:00 GET

Shturmi	0–1	Merani Martvili
	Report	Jimsheleishvili 90+6'

Sartichala Central stadium
Referee: J.Khorava
16 December
13:00 GET

Merani Martvili	1–1 (a.e.t.)	Shturmi
Rasulov 120'	Report	Ugrekhelidze 39'

Murtaz Khurtsilava stadium, Martvili
Referee: B.Ninua

== See also ==
• 2024 Erovnuli Liga

• 2024 Liga 3

• 2024 Liga 4

• 2024 Georgian Cup
