= Erovnuli Liga playoffs =

Promotion-relegation football playoffs in Georgia

Erovnuli Liga playoffs is the annual knockout stage to determine the seat of Erovnuli Liga between the football team from Umaglesi Liga and Erovnuli Liga 2. Since 2001, the team were from Erovnuli Liga which finished right above relegated team, and from Erovnuli Liga 2 which finished right below promoted team.

== Results ==
=== 1991 ===
Iveria	2 – 3 (a.e.t.)	Mretebi

=== 1999 ===
First round

Sioni	2 – 0	TSU

Sioni Bolnisi remain at Umaglesi Liga. TSU Tbilisi entered losing side playoffs

Dinamo-2 Tbilisi	1 – 1 (a.e.t.) 4 – 2 (PSO)	Gortskali (Dzveli Anaga)

Kolkheti Khobi	1 – 0	Sulori

Dinamo-2 Tbilisi promoted and renamed as Tbilisi. Kolkheti Khobi promoted.

Second round

Gortskali	2 – 0	Sulori

TSU	3 – 0	Gortskali

TSU Tbilisi remain at Umaglesi Liga.

=== 2000 ===
Not held

=== 2001 ===
May 27, 2001

Dila	0 – 2	Samgurali

=== 2002 ===
May 29, 2002

Gorda 2000	2 – 1	Kobuleti

=== 2003 ===
June 4, 2003

Gorda 2000	0 – 1 (a.e.t.)	Mtskheta

=== 2004 ===
May 29, 2004

Mtskheta-Urioni	2 – 3	Gorda 2000

May 29, 2004

Dinamo Batumi	1 – 0	Milani

=== 2005 ===
Not held

=== 2006 ===
May 14, 2006

Tbilisi	4 – 1	Meshakre

May 15, 2006

Tskhinvali	2 – 1 (a.e.t.)	Gagra

=== 2007 ===
May 27, 2007

Chikhura	2 – 1 (a.e.t.)	Gagra

=== 2008 ===
May 24, 2008

Spartaki	1 – 0	Gagra

=== 2011 ===
May 29, 2011

Chikhura	1 – 2	Spartaki
Gvetadze 61'	Report	Metreveli 8'; Buzaladze 27'

Boris Paichadze Stadium, Tbilisi
Attendance: 2,000
Referee: Levan Silagava

May 30, 2011

Dila	2 – 0	Samtredia
Razhamashvili 45', 48'	Report

Boris Paichadze Stadium, Tbilisi
Attendance: 1,500

=== 2012 ===
Not held

=== 2013 ===
Not held

=== 2014 ===
Not held

=== 2015 ===
May 27, 2015

Metalurgi Rustavi	0 – 5	Locomotive
	Report	o.g. 15'; Gavashelishvili 29'; G.Gagnidze 49', 53'; Chikhladze 71'

Mikheil Meskhi Stadium#2, Tbilisi
Attendance: 2,000

=== 2016 (spring) ===
May 29, 2016

Zugdidi	2 – 1	Kolkheti Khobi
Tsurtsumia 45'; Samushia 53'	Report	Chanturidze 29'

Saragbo Baza Parki-Arena, Poti
Attendance: 1,500
Referee: G.Vadachkoria

=== 2016 (autumn) ===
December 1, 2016

Guria	0 – 2	Dila
	Report	Dan Kowa 56'; Etou 82'

Evgrapi Shevardnadze Stadium, Lanchkhuti
Attendance: 400
Referee: B.Ninua
December 6, 2016

Dila	0 – 0	Guria
	Report

Tengiz Burjanadze Stadium, Gori
Attendance: 300
Referee: G.Kikacheishvili

Dila Gori retained their place for 2017 Erovnuli Liga; Guria Lanchkhuti were relegated to 2017 Erovnuli Liga 2.

December 1, 2016

Sioni	4 – 3	Shukura
Svanidze 16'; Sikharulidze 45+2', 85'; Vasadze 72'	Report	Komakhidze 9'; Konyeha 18'; Shalamberidze 84'

Tamaz Stepania Stadium, Bolnisi
Attendance: 1,500
Referee: G.Vadachkoria
December 6, 2016

Shukura	2 – 0	Sioni
Guruli 40'; Jefinho 90+4'

Chele Arena, Kobuleti
Attendance: 1,500

Shukura Kobuleti retained their place for 2017 Erovnuli Liga; Sioni Bolnisi were relegated to 2017 Erovnuli Liga 2

=== 2017 ===
November 30, 2017

Sioni	3 – 2	Dinamo Batumi
Dvali 13', 27', 45+1'	Report	Kvirkvelia 36'; Tevdoradze 40'

Tamaz Stepania Stadium, Bolnisi
Attendance: 1,500
Referee: P.Matcharadze
December 3, 2017

Dinamo Batumi	3 – 2 (a.e.t.) 2 – 4 (PSO)	Sioni
Grigalashvili 8'; Kvasov 62'; Martsvaladze 84'	Report	Koshkadze 36'; Sikharulia 90+1'

Batumi Rugby Arena, Batumi
Attendance: 2,000
Referee: G.Vadachkoria

Sioni are promoted to 2018 Erovnuli Liga.

November 30, 2017

Kolkheti Poti	2 – 1	Merani Martvili
Derebchynskiy 36' Bolkvadze 41'	Report	Tretyak 43'

Saragbo Baza Parki-Arena, Poti
Attendance: 1,500
Referee: G.Kikacheishvili
December 3, 2017

Merani Martvili	2 – 2	Kolkheti Poti
Kurdgelashvili 16', 90+2'	Report	Bukhaidze 54', 90'

Murtaz Khurtsilava Stadium, Martvili
Attendance: 2,000
Referee: G.Kruashvili

Both teams remained in their leagues respectively.

=== 2018 ===
December 12, 2018

Gagra	0 – 1	Sioni
	Report	Isiani 64'

Tengiz Burjanadze Stadium, Gori
Attendance: 700
December 15, 2018

Sioni	3 – 0	Gagra
Isiani 28'; Khmaladze 51'; D.Kirkitadze 73'	Report

Tamaz Stepania Stadium, Bolnisi
Attendance: 1,200
Referee: D.Kharitonashvili

Both teams remained in their leagues respectively.

December 12, 2018

Samtredia	2 – 2	WIT Georgia
Pantsulaia 22', 90+2'	Report	Maisuradze 58'; Getiashvili 69'

Ramaz Shengelia Stadium, Kutaisi
Attendance: 500
December 15, 2018

WIT Georgia	4 – 0	Samtredia
Ghirdaladze 5'; Maisuradze 13'; Sajaia 61'; Vazagashvili 63'	Report

Mtskheta Park, Mtskheta
Attendance: 500

WIT Georgia are promoted to 2019 Erovnuli Liga.

=== 2019 ===
5 December 2019

Telavi	1–0	Rustavi
Basheleishvili 54'	Report

Givi Chokheli Stadium, Telavi
Attendance: 1,000
Referee: Giorgi Kruashvili
11 December 2019

Rustavi	1–2	Telavi
Kavtaradze 3' (pen.)	Report	Latsabidze 15' (o.g.); Dzotsenidze 32'

Poladi Stadium, Rustavi
Attendance: 700
Referee: Irakli Kvirikashvili

Telavi are promoted to 2020 Erovnuli Liga.

5 December 2019
14:00

Sioni	0–0	Samtredia
	Report

Tamaz Stephania Stadium, Bolnisi
Attendance: 1,000
Referee: Papuna Matcharadze
11 December 2019
13:30

Samtredia	4–1	Sioni
Kilasonia 32'; Qurbanov 38', 71'; Samushia 64'	Report	Ugulava 77'

Erosi Manjgaladze Stadium, Samtredia
Attendance: 2,000
Referee: Giorgi Vadatchkoria

Samtredia are promoted to 2020 Erovnuli Liga.

=== 2020 ===
15 December 2020

Gagra	0–2	Torpedo Kutaisi
	Report	Ivanishvili 24'; Nadaraia 81'

National Rugby Training Center, Tbilisi
Attendance: 0
Referee: Giorgi Vadatchkoria
19 December 2020

Torpedo Kutaisi	1–1	Gagra
Pantsulaia 30'	Report	Makatsaria 76'

Ramaz Shengelia Stadium, Kutaisi
Attendance: 0
Referee: Jener Khorava

15 December 2020
17:30

Chikhura	0–2	Samgurali
	Report	Burjanadze 77'; Kukhianidze 81'

Mikheil Meskhi Stadium#2, Tbilisi
Attendance: 0
Referee: Irakli Kvirikashvili
19 December 2020
13:00

Samgurali	1–0	Chikhura
Kukhianidze 87'	Report

26 May Stadium, Tskaltubo
Attendance: 0
Referee: Goga Kikacheishvili

Samgurali are promoted to 2021 Erovnuli Liga.

=== 2021 ===
December 8, 2021

Shukura	0 – 0	Gagra
	Report

Chele Arena, Kobuleti
Referee: Goga Kikacheishvili
December 12, 2021

Gagra	1 – 0	Shukura
Makatsaria 7'	Report

Tbilisis zghvis baza, Tbilisi
Referee: Davit Kharitonashvili

Gagra were promoted to 2022 Erovnuli Liga.

8 December 2021
13:00

Merani Martvili	2–0	Torpedo
Sila 13'; Meliava 34'	Report

Murtaz Khurtsilava Stadium, Martvili
Referee: Arsen Nonikashvili
12 December 2021
19:00

Torpedo	3–0 (a.e.t.)	Merani Martvili
Tsintsadze 64' (pen.); Mudimu 87'; Akhvlediani 102'	Report

Ramaz Shengelia Stadium, Kutaisi
Referee: Giorgi Kruashvili

Torpedo retained a place in 2022 Erovnuli Liga.

=== 2022 ===
7 December 2022
13:00

Samtredia	1–0	Sioni
Kilasonia 79' (pen.)	Report

Erosi Manjgaladze Stadium, Samtredia
Referee: Giorgi Kruashvili

Samtredia were promoted to 2023 Erovnuli Liga

11 December 2022
13:00

Sioni	0–2	Samtredia
		Chamba 9', 74'

Tamaz Stepania Stadium, Bolnisi
Referee: Davit Kharitonishvili

8 December 2022
13:00

Gagra	2–0	Spaeri
Nozadze 8'; Makatsaria 63'

Boris Paichadze Dinamo Arena, Tbilisi
Referee: Irakli Kvirikashvili
12 December 2022
13:00

Spaeri	3–1 (a.e.t.)	Gagra
Tsatskrialashvili 35'; Papava 48' (pen.), 98'		Makatsaria 95' (pen.)
Penalties
Papava (penalty scored); Matenjva (penalty missed); Khojanashvili (penalty scored); Odishelidze (penalty scored); Kirkitadze (penalty scored); Askurava (penalty missed)	4–5	Khositashvili (penalty scored); Lomtadze (penalty scored); Sultanishvili (penalty scored); Lominadze (penalty scored); Parulava (penalty missed); Shetsiruli (penalty scored)

Spaeri Stadium, Tbilisi
Referee: Jener Khorava

Gagra retained a place in 2023 Erovnuli Liga.

=== 2023 ===
6 December

Spaeri	1–1	Telavi
Gegiadze 36'	Report	Irakli Rukhadze 61'

Spaeri stadium, Tbilisi
10 December

Telavi	4–0	Spaeri
Ashortia 15' (pen.), 53'; Rukhadze 21', Kantaria 28'	Report

Kavkasioni Arena, Telavi

6 December 2023
13:00

Samtredia	4–1	Gareji
Mishov 6'; Pavisic 25'; Akhvlediani 38'; Natchkebia 43'	Report	Kharebashvili 67'

Erosi Manjgaladze Stadium, Samtredia
Referee: Aleko Aptsiauri
10 December 2023
13:00

Gareji	3–1	Samtredia
Ugrekhelidze 14'; Papuashvili 36'; Kharebashvili 47'	Report	Natchkebia 8'

Central stadium, Sagarejo
Referee: Irakli Kvirikashvili

Both Telavi and Samtredia retained their places

=== 2024 ===
12 December

Sioni	1–1	Gagra
Makatsaria 44'	Report	Chamba 83'

Tamaz Stepania Stadium, Bolnisi
Referee: Irakli Kvirikashvili
16 December

Gagra	2–2 (a.e.t.) (7–6 p)	Sioni
Kimadze 52'; Nozadze 104' (o.g.)	Report	Rekhviashvili 45+2'; Tsirdava 94'

Davit Petriashvili Arena, Tbilisi
Referee: Giorgi Kruashvili

12 December

Telavi	2–1	Rustavi
Tsnobiladze 45+6'; Georgijević 60'	Report	Kilasonia 83'

Kavkasioni Arena, Telavi
Referee: Goga Kikacheishvili
16 December

Rustavi	1–1	Telavi
Nakano 12'	Report	Zhividze 116'

Technical Centre, Rustavi
Referee: Aleko Aptsiauri

Telavi and Gagra both preserved their places in the Erovnuli Liga

=== 2025 ===
10 December 2025
13:30

Meshakhte	1–1	Telavi
C.Timi 39'	Report	Devdariani 56'

Agrano Vachadze stadium, Ambrolauri
Referee: G.Machitidze
14 December 2025
18:00

Telavi	1–1 (a.e.t.) (2–4 p)	Meshakhte
Martin 31' (pen.); Devdariani (red card) 103'	Report	Fobi 74'

Davit Petriashvili Arena, Tbilisi
Referee: G.Kikacheishvili

10 December 2025
16:00

Gareji	0–2	Spaeri
	Report	Basilashvili 25'; Gegiadze 71'

Mikheil Meskhi 2
Referee: J.Khorava
14 December 2025
19:00

Spaeri	1–2	Gareji
Basilashvili 28'	Report	Papava 53' (pen.), 63' (pen.); Kamladze (red card) 56'

Spaeri stadium
Referee: G.Kruashvili

Telavi and Gareji were relegated
