= Tamaz Makatsaria =

Georgian association football player

Personal information
- Date of birth: 3 October 1995 (age 31)
- Place of birth: Georgia
- Height: 1.80 m (5 ft 11 in)
- Position: Forward

Team information
- Current team: Samtredia
- Number: 9

Youth career
- Dinamo Tbilisi academy
- Avaza

Senior career*
Years	Team	Apps	(Gls)
2012–2015	Tskhinvali	50	(7)
2015–2016	Dinamo Batumi	12	(2)
2016–2017	Tskhinvali	40	(22)
2018	Rustavi	10	(1)
2018	Samtredia	9	(0)
2019	Sioni	11	(0)
2019	WIT Georgia	11	(0)
2020–2021	Gagra	33	(26)
2022	Dila	14	(3)
2022	Gagra	15	(3)
2023	Kyzylzhar	13	(1)
2023	Zhenis	14	(11)
2024	Niki Volos	7	(0)
2024–25	Sioni	43	(12)
2026–	Samtredia	16	(7)
- * Club domestic league appearances and goals as of 11 July 2026

Tamaz Makatsaria (Georgian: თამაზ მაქაცარია) is a Georgian footballer who plays as an attacker for Erovnuli Liga 2 club Samtredia.

Makatsaria is the winner of the Georgian Cup with Gagra. Individually, he was a shared topscorer of the 2021 Erovnuli Liga 2 season.

== Career ==
Тamaz Makatsaria spent a part of his youth career at Dinamo's academy and Avaza before moving to Tskhinvali's reserve team in 2012. On 14 November 2012, Makatsaria made his debut in the 2nd division when he came off the bench and five minutes later scored an injury-time goal to seal a 4–1 win over Samtredia. In 2013, his team won the title race with a 14-point margin and earned promotion to the Umaglesi Liga.

In January 2015, Makatsaria joined Dinamo Batumi where his father Davit had played in the mid-1990s as a midfielder. On 7 November 2015, Makatsaria scored the first top-flight goal in a 1–0 away win over Shukura. The next summer, he reunited with Tskhinvali, who had suffered relegation to the Pirveli Liga the previous season, to display his goal-scoring skills in full. With 21 goals he ended up as his team's topscorer in 2017. Overall, Tskhinvali was the club Makatsaria made most appearances for during his career (100 games in both competitions).

In 2020, Makatsaria won the first trophy of his career following Gagra's victorious cup campaign. Makatsaria had another memorable season with this 2nd division team the next year as he netted 23 times in 24 league games, sharing topscorer's award with Merani's Cheikne Sylla. He also bagged a winner against Shukura in playoffs which ensured Gagra's return to the top flight after a ten-year absence. Besides, Makatsaria scored his first European goal in a 2021–22 UEFA Europa Conference League game against Montenegrin side Sutjeska.

In mid-December 2021, Erovnuli Liga bronze medal holders Dila announced the signing a two-year deal with Makatsaria, but after six months the sides terminated the contract by mutual consent which enabled the player to return to Gagra now in the top division. At the end of this season, Makatsaria netted a brace in another relegation/promotion playoff tie in which Gagra managed to beat Spaeri on penalties and retain their top-tier place.

Makatsaria spent the 2023 season in Kazakhstan. Kyzylzhar became his first foreign club in February, although at half season he joined lower league club Zhenis on a six-month deal and contributed to their promotion with 11 goals scored in 14 appearances.

Following another short spell at Greek Super League 2 club Niki Volos, Makatsaria moved to Georgian 2nd division club Sioni in September 2024. In November alone, he netted five times, helping the team to reach playoffs. Makatsaria gave Sioni the lead in a two-legged tie against Gagra on 12 December 2024, but eventually after a 3–3 aggregate score his team failed to prevail in the penalty shoot-out.

== Statistics ==
As of match played 23 June 2026

Appearances and goals by club, season and competition
Club	Season	League			National cup		Continental		Other		Total	
Club	Season	Division	Apps	Goals	Apps	Goals	Apps	Goals	Apps	Goals	Apps	Goals
Tskhinvali	2012–13	Pirveli Liga	27	7	5	0	–		–		32	7
Tskhinvali	2013–14	Umaglesi Liga	13	0	2	1	–		–		15	1
Tskhinvali	2014–15	Umaglesi Liga	10	0	3	0	–		–		13	0
Dinamo Batumi	2015–16	Umaglesi Liga	12	2	–		–		–		12	2
Tskhinvali	2016	Umaglesi Liga	11	1	–		–		–		11	1
Tskhinvali	2017	Erovnuli Liga 2	29	21	–		–		–		29	21
Tskhinvali	Total		90	31	10	1	0	0	0	0	100	32
Rustavi	2018	Erovnuli Liga	10	1	1	0	–		–		11	1
Samtredia	2018	Erovnuli Liga	9	0	–		2 (Note: Appearances in UEFA Europa League)	0	2 (Note: Appearances in Erovnuli Liga playoffs)	0	11	0
Sioni	2019	Erovnuli Liga	11	0	1	1	–		–		12	1
WIT Georgia	2019	Erovnuli Liga	11	0	–		–		–		11	0
Gagra	2020	Erovnuli Liga 2	9	3	4	0	–		2	1	15	4
Gagra	2021	Erovnuli Liga 2	24	23	1	0	2 (Note: Appearances in UEFA Conference League)	1	3 (Note: Two appearances in Erovnuli Liga playoffs and one appearance in Georgian Super Cup)	1	30	25
Dila	2022	Erovnuli Liga	14	3	–		–		–		14	3
Gagra	2022	Erovnuli Liga	15	3	–		–		2	2	17	5
Gagra	Total		48	29	5	0	2	1	7	4	62	34
Kyzylzhar	2023	Kazakhstan Premier League	13	1	4	0	–		–		17	1
Zhenis	2023	Kazakhstan First Division	14	11	–		–		–		14	11
Niki Volos	2023–24	Super League Greece 2	7	0	–		–		–		7	0
Sioni	2024	Erovnuli Liga 2	18	7	–		–		2	1	20	8
Sioni	2025	Erovnuli Liga 2	25	5	1	0	–		–		26	5
Sioni	Total		43	12	1	0	0	0	2	1	46	13
Samtredia	2026	Erovnuli Liga 2	16	7	–		–		–		16	7
Career total			298	95	22	2	4	1	11	4	335	102

== Honours ==
=== Team ===
- Georgian Cup: 2020

=== Individual ===
- Erovnuli Liga 2 topscorer: 2021 (shared)
