= Data Sitchinava =

Georgian footballer

Personal information
- Date of birth: 21 March 1989 (age 37)
- Place of birth: Poti, Georgian SSR
- Height: 1.80 m (5 ft 11 in)
- Position: Midfielder

Team information
- Current team: Guria
- Number: 10

Senior career*
| Years | Team | Apps | (Gls) |
| 2009–2011 | Kolkheti 1913 | 48 | (17) |
| 2011 | Gagra | 13 | (2) |
| 2012 | Kolkheti 1913 | 6 | (0) |
| 2012 | Dinamo Batumi | 15 | (1) |
| 2013 | Dinamo Brest | 13 | (0) |
| 2013–2014 | Kolkheti 1913 | 31 | (17) |
| 2015 | Sioni Bolnisi | 14 | (5) |
| 2015 | Torpedo Kutaisi | 14 | (5) |
| 2016 | Kolkheti 1913 | 14 | (1) |
| 2016–2018 | Rustavi | 54 | (43) |
| 2018 | → Merani Martvili (loan) | 12 | (2) |
| 2019 | Tskhinvali | 14 | (7) |
| 2019 | Rustavi | 14 | (2) |
| 2020 | Zugdidi | 18 | (9) |
| 2021 | Sioni Bolnisi | 35 | (20) |
| 2022–2023 | Kolkheti 1913 | 58 | (36) |
| 2024–2025 | Sioni Bolnisi | 68 | (41) |
| 2026– | Guria | 25 | (17) |
- * Club domestic league appearances and goals as of 3 November 2026

Data Sitchinava (Georgian: დათა სიჭინავა; born 21 March 1989) is a Georgian professional footballer who currently plays as a midfielder for Liga 3 club Guria.

Born in the city of Poti, Sitchinava has spent eight seasons at his hometown club and twice, in 2010 and 2023, played a key role in their promotion to the top division. Apart from being named as Footballer of the Year in the second division, he is the two-time champion of the Erovnuli Liga 2.

== Career ==
Sitchinava signed his first professional contract with Ameri Tbilisi.

He spent the second half of 2011 at Gagra who had just gained promotion to Umaglesi Liga. With this team Sitchinava made his European debut on 14 July 2011 in a Europa League qualifier against Anorthosis Famagusta.

While at Rustavi, in 2017 Sitchinava netted 30 goals and as a top scorer of the 2nd division received the Player of the Year award.

He was a top goalscorer for Sioni Bolnisi in 2021 with 20 goals, largely contributing to the team's promotion to the top flight. Moreover, this season he was named the best player of the last quarter (Round 28–36). On 24 November 2021, he scored his 100th goal in the second division in a 5–2 win over Chikhura in which he netted a hat-trick.

Following this successful season, Sitchinava unexpectedly joined Liga 3 side Kolkheti 1913 in February 2022 for the fifth spell. With 19 goals scored in 25 league appearances he once again proved his goalscoring abilities that helped the team achieve a long-awaited promotion.

In a decisive crunch game of the 2023 season against Gareji, Sitchinava scored a sublime long-distance free kick, which proved enough for Kolkheti 1913 to win the league. Overall, he netted 17 goals this season and became the top goalscorer of his team. However, the sides parted company before the start of the next season and Sitchinava returned to Liga 2 side Sioni for his third stint. He added 41 more league goals to his account during the next two seasons and finished 2nd in both occasions in goalscorers' race.

In January 2026, Sitchinava moved to Liga 3 side Guria.

== Career statistics ==
As of match played 30 October 2026

Appearances and goals by club, season and competition
| Club | Season | League | | | National cup | | Continental | | Other | | Total | |
| Club | Season | Division | Apps | Goals | Apps | Goals | Apps | Goals | Apps | Goals | Apps | Goals |
|---|---|---|---|---|---|---|---|---|---|---|---|---|
| Kolkheti 1913 | 2009–10 | Pirveli Liga | 21 | 13 | 4 | 1 | – | | – | | 25 | 14 |
| Kolkheti 1913 | 2010–11 | Umaglesi Liga | 27 | 4 | 1 | 0 | – | | – | | 28 | 4 |
| Kolkheti 1913 | 2011–12 | Umaglesi Liga | 6 | 0 | – | | – | | – | | 6 | 0 |
| Kolkheti 1913 | 2013–14 | Pirveli Liga | 16 | 11 | 3 | 0 | – | | – | | 19 | 11 |
| Kolkheti 1913 | 2014–15 | Umaglesi Liga | 15 | 6 | 4 | 4 | – | | – | | 19 | 10 |
| Kolkheti 1913 | 2015–16 | Umaglesi Liga | 14 | 1 | – | | – | | – | | 14 | 1 |
| Kolkheti 1913 | 2022 | Liga 3 | 25 | 19 | 1 | 0 | – | | – | | 26 | 19 |
| Kolkheti 1913 | 2023 | Erovnuli Liga 2 | 33 | 17 | 4 | 2 | – | | – | | 37 | 19 |
| Kolkheti 1913 | Total | | 157 | 71 | 17 | 7 | 0 | 0 | 0 | 0 | 174 | 78 |
| Gagra | 2011–12 | Umaglesi Liga | 13 | 2 | 1 | 0 | 1 (Note: Appearance in Europa League qualifiers) | 0 | – | | 15 | 2 |
| Dinamo Batumi | 2012–13 | Umaglesi Liga | 15 | 1 | 1 | 1 | – | | – | | 16 | 2 |
| Dinamo Brest | 2013 | Belarusian; Premier League | 13 | 0 | – | | – | | – | | 13 | 0 |
| Sioni Bolnisi | 2014–15 | Umaglesi Liga | 14 | 5 | – | | – | | – | | 14 | 5 |
| Sioni Bolnisi | 2021 | Erovnuli Liga 2 | 35 | 20 | 2 | 0 | – | | – | | 37 | 20 |
| Sioni Bolnisi | 2024 | Erovnuli Liga 2 | 33 | 21 | 1 | 1 | – | | 2 (Note: Appearance in play-offs) | 0 | 36 | 22 |
| Sioni Bolnisi | 2025 | Erovnuli Liga 2 | 35 | 20 | 2 | 4 | – | | – | | 37 | 24 |
| Sioni Bolnisi | Total | | 117 | 66 | 5 | 5 | 0 | 0 | 2 | 0 | 124 | 71 |
| Torpedo Kutaisi | 2015–16 | Umaglesi Liga | 14 | 5 | 5 | 1 | – | | – | | 19 | 6 |
| Rustavi | 2016 | Pirveli Liga | 14 | 12 | – | | – | | – | | 17 | 12 |
| Rustavi | 2017 | Erovnuli Liga 2 | 35 | 30 | 3 | 1 | – | | – | | 38 | 31 |
| Rustavi | 2018 | Erovnuli Liga | 5 | 1 | – | | – | | – | | 5 | 1 |
| Rustavi | 2019 | Erovnuli Liga | 14 | 2 | 1 | 0 | – | | 1 | 0 | 16 | 2 |
| Rustavi | Total | | 68 | 45 | 4 | 1 | 0 | 0 | 1 | 0 | 73 | 46 |
| Merani Martvili (loan) | 2018 | Erovnuli Liga 2 | 12 | 2 | 1 | 0 | – | | – | | 13 | 2 |
| Tskhinvali | 2019 | Erovnuli Liga 2 | 14 | 7 | 1 | 0 | – | | – | | 15 | 7 |
| Dinamo Zugdidi | 2020 | Erovnuli Liga 2 | 18 | 9 | 1 | 0 | – | | – | | 19 | 9 |
| Guria | 2026 | Liga 3 | 25 | 17 | 3 | 1 | – | | – | | 28 | 18 |
| Career total | | | 466 | 225 | 39 | 16 | 1 | 0 | 3 | 0 | 516 | 241 |

== Honours ==
Individual

- Top scorer and Erovnuli Liga 2 Player of the Year: 2017

Team

- Erovnuli Liga 2 champion: 2021, 2023
- Erovnuli Liga 2 runner-up: 2009–10
