= 2020 Erovnuli Liga =

Erovnuli Liga
- Season: 2020
- Dates: 29 February 2020 – 10 December 2020
- Champions: Dinamo Tbilisi; 18th Georgian title
- Relegated: Merani Tbilisi; Chikhura
- Champions League: Dinamo Tbilisi
- Conference League: Dinamo Batumi; Dila Gori
- Matches: 90
- Goals: 225 (2.5 per match)
- Top goalscorer: Mykola Kovtalyuk (10 goals)
- Biggest home win: Dila Gori 6–1 Chikhura (17 October 2020)
- Biggest away win: Chikhura 2-8 Saburtalo Tbilisi (18 August 2020)
- Highest scoring: Chikhura 2-8 Saburtalo Tbilisi (18 August 2020)
- Longest winning run: 3 matches Dila Gori; Dinamo Tbilisi
- Longest unbeaten run: 10 matches Dinamo Batumi
- Longest winless run: 12 matches Merani Tbilisi
- Longest losing run: 4 matches Merani Tbilisi
- All statistics correct as of 25 October 2020.

The 2020 Erovnuli Liga or Crystalbet Erovnuli Liga 2020 (formerly known as Umaglesi Liga) was the 32nd season of top-tier football in Georgia. Dinamo Tbilisi were the defending champions. The season began on 29 February 2020 and ended on 10 December 2020. The league winner, Dinamo Tbilisi, earned a place in the UEFA Champions League and the second and third-placed clubs, Dinamo Batumi and Dila Gori respectively, earned a place in the new UEFA Europa Conference League.

In March the season was suspended following a decision by the Georgian Football Federation due to COVID-19 pandemic, initially until 1 April, but later the suspension was extended to late June. Each team played 18 matches instead of the planned 36.

== Teams and stadiums ==
Locations of the 2020 Erovnuli Liga teams.

Team	Location	Venue	Capacity
Chikhura Sachkhere	Kutaisi	Ramaz Shengelia Stadium	19,400
Dila Gori	Gori	Tengiz Burjanadze Stadium	5,000
Dinamo Batumi	Batumi	Batumi Stadium	20,000
Dinamo Tbilisi	Tbilisi	Boris Paichadze Stadium	54,549
Locomotive Tbilisi	Tbilisi	Mikheil Meskhi Stadium	22,754
Merani Tbilisi	Tbilisi	Sinatle Stadium	2,500
Saburtalo Tbilisi	Tbilisi	Mikheil Meskhi Stadium	27,223
FC Samtredia	Samtredia	Erosi Manjgaladze Stadium	5,000
FC Telavi	Telavi	Givi Chokheli Stadium	12,000
Torpedo Kutaisi	Kutaisi	Ramaz Shengelia Stadium	19,400

== League table ==
Pos	Team	Pld	W	D	L	GF	GA	GD	Pts	Qualification or relegation
1	Dinamo Tbilisi (C)	18	12	4	2	33	9	+24	40	Qualification for the Champions League first qualifying round
2	Dinamo Batumi	18	10	6	2	29	14	+15	36	Qualification for the Europa Conference League first qualifying round
3	Dila Gori	18	8	6	4	29	17	+12	30	Qualification for the Europa Conference League first qualifying round
4	Locomotive Tbilisi	18	8	5	5	30	23	+7	29	
5	Saburtalo	18	7	6	5	28	21	+7	27	
6	Telavi	18	4	12	2	21	14	+7	24	
7	Samtredia	18	5	4	9	14	23	−9	19	
8	Torpedo Kutaisi (O)	18	4	5	9	17	30	−13	17	Qualification to Relegation play-offs
9	Chikhura (R)	18	3	4	11	18	40	−22	13	Qualification to Relegation play-offs
10	Merani Tbilisi (R)	18	0	6	12	6	34	−28	6	Relegation to Erovnuli Liga 2

Source: Erovnuli Liga, Soccerway
Rules for classification: 1) Points; 2) Head-to-head points; 3) Head-to-head goal difference; 4) Head-to-head goals scored; 5) Head-to-head away goals scored (only if two teams); 6) Goal difference; 7) Goals scored.
FC Gagra of the Erovnuli Liga 2 are the winners of the 2020 Georgian Cup and qualify for the first qualifying round of the Europa Conference League.
(C) Champions; (O) Play-off winners; (R) Relegated

== Results ==
Each team will play the other nine teams home and away, for a total of 18 games each.

Home \ Away	CHI	DIL	DBT	DTB	LOC	MER	SAB	SAM	TEL	TKU
Chikhura	—	0–2	0–4	2–0	1–3	3–0	2–8	0–1	1–2	2–2
Dila Gori	6–1	—	1–1	0–3	0–1	4–0	4–3	1–1	0–0	3–1
Dinamo Batumi	0–0	1–0	—	1–3	1–2	0–0	1–1	2–0	1–1	2–0
Dinamo Tbilisi	1–0	1–2	1–1	—	4–0	3–0	3–1	1–0	0–0	2–1
Locomotive Tbilisi	4–1	1–2	1–4	0–2	—	1–1	2–1	3–1	1–1	1–2
Merani Tbilisi	1–2	0–0	1–2	1–2	0–4	—	0–0	1–2	1–6	0–2
Saburtalo	2–1	1–1	0–1	0–3	0–0	0–0	—	2–1	1–0	1–0
Samtredia	0–0	1–0	1–2	0–4	0–0	2–0	1–2	—	0–0	1–0
Telavi	2–0	1–1	1–3	0–0	1–1	0–0	1–1	3–1	—	1–1
Torpedo Kutaisi	2–2	0–2	1–2	0–0	1–5	1–0	0–4	2–1	1–1	—

Source: Erovnuli Liga
Legend: Blue = home team win; Yellow = draw; Red = away team win.

== Relegation play-offs ==
15 December 2020
13:30

Gagra	0–2	Torpedo Kutaisi
	Report	Ivanishvili 24'; Nadaraia 81'

National Rugby Training Center, Tbilisi
Attendance: 0
Referee: Giorgi Vadatchkoria
19 December 2020
18:00

Torpedo Kutaisi	1–1	Gagra
Pantsulaia 30'	Report	Makatsaria 76'

Ramaz Shengelia Stadium, Kutaisi
Attendance: 0
Referee: Jener Khorava

15 December 2020
17:30

Chikhura	0–2	Samgurali
	Report	Burjanadze 77'; Kukhianidze 81'

Mikheil Meskhi Stadium#2, Tbilisi
Attendance: 0
Referee: Irakli Kvirikashvili
19 December 2020
13:00

Samgurali	1–0	Chikhura
Kukhianidze 87'	Report

26 May Stadium, Tsqaltubo
Attendance: 0
Referee: Goga Kikacheishvili

== Season statistics ==
=== Top scorers ===
As of matches played on 10 December 2020

Rank	Player	Club	Goals
1	(Ukraine) Mykola Kovtalyuk	Dila Gori	10
2	(Georgia (country)) Irakli Sikharulidze	Locomotive Tbilisi	8
2	(Georgia (country)) Jaba Jighauri	Dinamo Batumi	8
2	(Russia) Nodar Kavtaradze	Dinamo Tbilisi	8
5	(Georgia (country)) Beka Kavtaradze	Saburtalo	7
5	(Georgia (country)) Giorgi Pantsulaia	Torpedo Kutaisi	7
7	(Georgia (country)) Nugzar Spanderashvili	Dila Gori	6
8	(Georgia (country)) Giorgi Gabedava	Dinamo Tbilisi	5
8	(Georgia (country)) Giorgi Nikabadze	Dinamo Batumi	5
8	(Georgia (country)) Mamia Gavashelishvili	Locomotive Tbilisi	5
8	(Georgia (country)) Irakli Rukhadze	Telavi	5
