= Givi Didava =

Georgian footballer

Givi Didava გივი დიდავა
Personal information
- Date of birth: 21 March 1976 (age 50)
- Place of birth: Kutaisi, Soviet Union
- Height: 1.84 m (6 ft 1/2 in)
- Position: Defender

Team information
- Current team: Spartaki-Tskhinvali Tbilisi

Senior career*
Years	Team	Apps	(Gls)
1992–1994	FC Torpedo Kutaisi	41	(0)
1994–2000	FC Dinamo Tbilisi	154	(3)
1999	→ K.R.C. Mechelen (loan)	4	(0)
2000–2002	Maccabi Tel Aviv	4	(0)
2001–2002	→ FC Torpedo Kutaisi (loan)	66	(17)
2003–2006	Kocaelispor	78	(0)
2006	FK Ventspils-2	3	(1)
2006–2008	FC Ameri Tbilisi	42	(3)
2008–2009	FC Sioni Bolnisi		
2009–	Spartaki-Tskhinvali Tbilisi		

International career^{‡}
1998–2003	Georgia	21	(0)
- * Club domestic league appearances and goals as of 1 June 2008 ‡ National team caps and goals as of 1 June 2008

Givi Didava (Georgian: გივი დიდავა; born 21 March 1976) is a Georgian former footballer who played as a defender. He played for clubs including Spartaki-Tskhinvali Tbilisi and Merani Martvili, and was capped 21 times for the Georgia national team between 1998 and 2003. His last recorded activity was in 2014.

Didava was a regular in the Dinamo Tbilisi defence from 1994 to 2000, during which period the club won five league titles. He was transferred to Israeli team Maccabi Tel Aviv FC in 2000, but played only 4 games before falling out with the coach. He promptly returned to Georgia and Torpedo Kutaisi, who took over the league hegemony. On 29 January 2003 he signed a contract with Turkish team Kocaelispor, moving there with teammate Revaz Kemoklidze. However, Kocaelispor was relegated, but while Kemoklidze left the club, Didava chose to see through his contract.

In summer 2006, Didava back to Georgian football.
