= FC Merani Tbilisi (2015) =

Merani
- Full name: FC Merani Tbilisi
- Founded: 2015 as Norchi Dinamo
- Ground: Shromiti Rezervebi; Tbilisi, Georgia
- Chairman: Jacob Deisadze
- Manager: Merab Mdivnishvili
- League: Liga 3
- 2025: 9th of 16
- Website: fcmeranitbilisi.ge

FC Merani Tbilisi (Georgian: საფეხბურთო კლუბი მერანი თბილისი) is a Georgian football club based in Tbilisi. They currently play in Liga 3, the third division in Georgian football and host their opponents at the Shromiti Rezervebi stadium located in Nadzaladevi.

The club was established in 2015 as Norchi Dinamo before changing its name to Merani four years later. They have spent one season in the top flight.

Despite the identical name, it should not be confused with the club dissolved in 2009.

== History ==
Norchi Dinamo started taking part in Regionuli Liga, the lowest domestic division, in 2015 and shortly advanced into Meore Liga where they won Group B a year later. However, the team continued playing in the league along with winners of other seven groups as no promotion was allowed in 2016.

Under manager Avtandil Shengelia, Norchi Dinamo qualified for Liga 2/3 playoffs after a second-place finish in 2017. They thrashed Meshakhte 6–0 on aggregate and secured promotion to the 2nd division.

At the end of their first season in Erovnuli Liga 2, the club announced it was being rebranded as Merani, although their youth teams retained the old name.

Merani had a highly successful season the next year. In September, the team eliminated Dinamo Tbilisi from the cup competition. Besides, they did not let the top spot slip and gained promotion to the Erovnuli Liga with forward Giorgi Nikabadze becoming the league top scorer with 26 goals.

Merani did not manage to stay in the top tier and suffered relegation following a winless campaign in 2020. They spent next two years in the 2nd league before dropping into Liga 3 in 2023.

== Seasons ==
| Year | Div. | Pos. | M | W | D | L | GF-GA | Pts | Notes | Cup |
|---|---|---|---|---|---|---|---|---|---|---|
| 2017 | 3rd, White Group | 3_{/10} | 18 | 10 | 4 | 4 | 39-24 | 34 | | 1/4 finals |
| 2017 | Promotion Group | 2_{/10} (Note: Beat Meshakhte 6–0 on aggregate in Liga 2/3 play-offs) | 18 | 12 | 3 | 3 | 56-15 | 39 | | 1/4 finals |
| 2018 | 2nd | 4_{/10} | 36 | 14 | 9 | 13 | 54-47 | 51 | | 1/16 finals |
| 2019 | 2nd | 1_{/10} | 36 | 25 | 6 | 5 | 87-35 | 81 | Promoted | 1/4 finals |
| 2020 | 1st | 10_{/10} | 18 | 0 | 6 | 12 | 6-34 | 6 | Relegated | 1/8 finals |
| 2021 | 2nd | 5_{/10} | 36 | 12 | 11 | 13 | 58-58 | 47 | | 1/16 finals |
| 2022 | 2nd | 6_{/10} | 28 | 10 | 4 | 14 | 34-58 | 34 | | 1/32 finals |
| 2023 | 2nd | 10_{/10} | 36 | 1 | 11 | 24 | 29-110 | 14 | Relegated | 1/16 finals |
| 2024 | 3rd | 7_{/16} | 30 | 11 | 10 | 9 | 49–42 | 43 | | 1/32 finals |
| 2025 | 3rd | 9_{/16} | 30 | 8 | 8 | 14 | 39–52 | 42 | | 1/64 finals |

== Honours ==
- Erovnuli Liga 2
  - Winner: 2019
- Meore Liga / Liga 3
  - Winner: 2016 (Group East B)
  - Runner-up: 2017

== Notable players ==
- Revaz Tevdoradze
- Giorgi Nikabadze
- Davit Bolkvadze
- Giorgi Kakhelishvili
- Mikheil Sardalishvili

== Other teams ==
The reserve team known as Merani-2 currently competes in the 5th tier. They played in the 3rd division for four years until 2024.
