= Erovnuli Liga 2 =

Georgian association football league

- Founded: 1990; 36 years ago
- Country: Georgia
- Confederation: UEFA
- Number of clubs: 10
- Level on pyramid: 2
- Promotion to: Erovnuli Liga
- Relegation to: Liga 3
- Domestic cup(s): Georgian Cup; Georgian Super Cup
- Current champions: Rustavi (3rd title) (2025)
- Most championships: Shukura (5 titles)
- Website: erovnuliliga.ge
- Current: 2026 Erovnuli Liga 2

The Georgian Erovnuli Liga 2 (Georgian: ეროვნული ლიგა 2; lit. 'National League 2'), organized since 1990 by the GFF, serves as the second division of professional football in Georgia.

The league was introduced for the 2017 season under the current name as a part of reorganization process of the entire league system. It was formerly known as Pirveli liga (the First league).

== Structure ==
There are ten clubs competing in Erovnuli Liga 2. During the season each club plays every other club four times, twice at home and twice away.

At the end of each season, the winner gains automatic promotion and the last-placed club is relegated. The runner-up and 3rd placed team participate in two-legged home and away play-off matches against the 9th and 8th placed clubs of Erovnuli Liga, respectively.

In case two or more teams obtain an equal number of points, final standings are determined by an aggregate of the results between them.

Seasons run on a full year system, running from spring to autumn.

== Format ==
Below is a complete record of how many teams have played in each season throughout the league's history.

- 1990 = 20
- 1991 = 18
- 1991-1992 = 20
- 1992-1993 = 16
- 1993-1994 = 32
- 1994-1995 = 29

- 1995-1996 = 39
- 1996-1997 = 37
- 1997-1998 = 54
- 1998-1999 = 55
- 1999-2000 = 46
- 2000-2002 = 12

- 2002-2005 = 16
- 2005-2007 = 18
- 2007-2008 = 20
- 2008-2009 = 22
- 2009-2010 = 15
- 2010-2011 = 17

- 2011-2012 = 20
- 2012-2013 = 24
- 2013-2014 = 26
- 2014-2015 = 20
- 2015-2016 = 18
- Since 2017 = 10

== Current members ==
Location of Liga 2 football clubs in 2026

Based on their performance in the previous year, the following ten teams will be competing in 2026 Erovnuli Liga 2.

The clubs are listed in alphabetical order.

Club	Position last season	Location	Region
Aragvi	4th in Liga 3	Tbilisi	Tbilisi
Gareji	9th in Liga 1	Sagarejo	Kakheti
Gori	2nd in Liga 3	Gori	Shida Kartli
Kolkheti 1913	10th in Liga 1	Poti	Samegrelo
Merani	4th	Martvili	Samegrelo
Odishi 1919	3rd in Liga 3	Zugdidi	Samegrelo
Samtredia	10th in Erovnuli Liga	Samtredia	Imereti
Shturmi	1st in Liga 3	Sartichala	Kvemo Kartli
Sioni	5th	Bolnisi	Kvemo Kartli
Telavi	8th in Liga 1	Telavi	Kakheti

Gareji, Kolkheti 1913, Merani, Samtredia and Sioni have previously taken part in the main division with the last two teams being also the national champions. Gori are the only club making their debut in the league this year.

== Results ==
=== Top three teams of Pirveli Liga ===
Season	Winner	Runner-up	Third place
1990	Sulori Vani	Margveti Zestaponi	Alazani Gurjaani
1991	Mretebi Tbilisi	Kakheti Telavi	Meshakhte Tkibuli
1991–92	Iveria Khashuri	Kakheti Telavi	Magaroeli Chiatura
1992–93	Shukura Kobuleti	Magaroeli Chiatura	Sapovnela Terjola
1993–94	Duruji Kvareli East; Egrisi Senaki West	Antsi Tbilisi East; Mertskhali Ozurgeti West	Tetri Artsivi Tbilisi East; Meshakhte Tkibuli West
1994–95	Sioni Bolnisi East; Egrisi Senaki West	Merani-91 Tbilisi East; Kakhaber-Iaguari Khelvachauri West	Meskheti Akhaltsikhe East; Meshakhte Tkibuli West
1995–96	Merani-91 Tbilisi East; Samgurali Tskaltubo West	Norchi Dinamoeli Tbilisi East; Anjeli Abasha West	WIT Georgia East; Magaroeli Chiatura West
1996–97	Morkinali Tbilisi East; Magaroeli Chiatura West	Locomotive Tbilisi East; Samgurali Tskaltubo West	Spartaki-Tskhinvali Tbilisi East; Mertskhali Ozurgeti West
1997–98	Arsenali Tbilisi	Iberia Samtredia	?
1998–99	Norchi Dinamoeli Tbilisi	Kolkheti Khobi	Ghartskali Dzveli Anaga; Sulori Vani
1999–00	Spartaki Tskhinvali (A); Locomotive Tbilisi (B)	Borjomi (A); Alazani Gurjaani (B)	Iveria Khashuri (A); Arsenali Tbilisi II (B)
2000–01	Guria Lanchkhuti	Margveti Zestaponi	Samgurali Tskaltubo
2001–02	Milani Tsnori	Dila Gori	Kobuleti
2002–03	Lazika Zugdidi	Mertskhali Ozurgeti	Mtskheta
2003–04	Kobuleti	Samgurali Tskaltubo	Milani Tsnori
2004–05	Ameri Tbilisi	Borjomi	Spartaki Tbilisi
2005–06	Chikhura Sachkhere	Merani Tbilisi	Gagra
2006–07	Mglebi Zugdidi	Meskheti Akhaltsikhe	Gagra
2007–08	Gagra East; Magharoeli Chiatura West	Dinamo-2 Tbilisi East; Meshakhte Tkibuli West	Wit-Georgia-2 Tbilisi East; Merani Martvili West
2008–09	Ameri Tbilisi East; Samtredia West	Chikhura Sachkhere East; Baia Zugdidi West	Wit-Georgia-2 Tbilisi East/ Merani Martvili West
2009–10	Torpedo Kutaisi	Kolkheti Poti	Merani Martvili
2010–11	Gagra	Merani Martvili	Dila Gori
2011–12	Chikhura Sachkhere	Dinamo Batumi	Guria Lanchkhuti
2012–13	Guria Lanchkhuti West; Spartaki Tskhinvali East	Dinamo-2 Tbilisi West; Locomotive Tbilisi East	Sasco Tbilisi West; Shukura Kobuleti East
2013–14	Shukura Kobuleti (A); Samtredia (B)	Kolkheti Poti (A); Dinamo Batumi (B)	Dinamo-2 Tbilisi (A); Matchakhela Khelvachauri (B)
2014–15	Saburtalo Tbilisi (A); Sapovnela Terjola (B)	Locomotive Tbilisi (A); Borjomi (B)	Lazika Zugdidi (A); Gagra (B)
2015–16	Liakhvi Tskhinvali	WIT Georgia	Kolkheti Khobi
2016	WIT Georgia Red; Rustavi White	Gagra Red; Samgurali Tskaltubo White	Borjomi Red; Meshakhte Tkibuli White

=== Top three teams of Erovnuli Liga 2 ===
Season	Winner	Runner-up	Third place
2017	Rustavi	Merani Martvili	Sioni
2018	Dinamo Batumi	WIT Georgia	Gagra
2019	Merani Tbilisi	Samtredia	Telavi
2020	Shukura	Samgurali	Gagra
2021	Sioni	Gagra	Merani Martvili
2022	Shukura	Spaeri	Samtredia
2023	Kolkheti 1913	Gareji	Spaeri
2024	Gareji	Rustavi	Sioni
2025	Rustavi	Spaeri	Meshakhte

=== Relegation and Promotion from Erovnuli Liga 2 ===
==== Promoted teams to Erovnuli Liga ====
Season	League Winner	Play-off winner
2017	Rustavi	Sioni
2018	Dinamo Batumi	WIT Georgia
2019	Merani Tbilisi	Samtredia • Telavi
2020	Shukura	Samgurali
2021	Sioni	Gagra
2022	Shukura	Samtredia
2023	Kolkheti 1913	–
2024	Gareji	–
2025	Rustavi	Spaeri • Meshakhte

==== Relegated teams to Liga 3 ====
Season	Club
2017	Zugdidi • Meshakhte • Guria
2018	Samgurali • Merani Martvili
2019	Guria • Kolkheti 1913 • Tskhinvali
2020	Aragvi
2021	Chikhura
2022	Rustavi • Dinamo Zugdidi • Shevardeni 1906
2023	Merani Martvili • Merani Tbilisi
2024	Aragvi • Shturmi • WIT Georgia • Kolkheti Khobi
2025	Locomotive • Iberia 1999 B • Gonio • Dinamo Tbilisi-2

== Performance per club ==
Since the restructuring into Liga 2 in 2017, 29 teams will have spent at least one season in the division as of 2026, including six of the ten clubs competing in the 2026 Erovnuli Liga.

Club	Total Seasons	Highest Position	Lowest Position	Season																	
Club	Total Seasons	Highest Position	Lowest Position	! rowspan=2 class="nowrap ts-vertical-header " style="" | 2017	2018	2019	2020	2021	2022	2023	2024	2025	2026								
Merani Martvili	7	2	10	2	2018	2019	2020	2021	2022	2023	2024	2025	2026	10	-	8	3	4	9	-	4
Sioni	7	1	7	3	-	-	7	1	-	4	3	5									
WIT Georgia	7	2	9	6	2	-	9	8	8	6	9	-	-								
Rustavi	6	1	9	1	-	-	4	9	7	-	2	1	-								
Dinamo Zugdidi	5	5	10	10	-	7	5	7	^{[a]}	-	-	-	-								
Gagra	5	2	5	4	3	5	3	2	-	-	-	-	-								
Gareji	5	1	5	-	-	-	-	4	5	2	1	-									
Merani Tbilisi	5	1	10	-	4	1	-	5	6	10	-	-	-								
Shevardeni 1906	5	4	6	-	6	4	6	6	^{[a]}	-	-	-	-								
Samtredia	4	2	6	-	-	2	-	-	3	-	-	6									
Shukura	4	1	7	-	7	6	1	-	1	-	-	-									
Spaeri	4	2	5	-	-	-	-	-	2	3	5	2	-								
Aragvi	3	7	10	-	-	-	10	-	-	-	7	-									
Dinamo Tbilisi-2	3	5	10	-	-	-	-	-	-	5	6	10	-								
Kolkheti 1913	3	1	9	-	-	9	-	-	-	1	-	-									
Locomotive	3	4	8	-	-	-	-	-	-	8	4	7	-								
Samgurali	3	2	8	5	8	-	2	-	-	-	-	-	-								
Telavi	3	3	5	-	5	3	-	-	-	-	-	-									
Tskhinvali	3	7	10	7	9	10	-	-	-	-	-	-	-								
Guria	2	8	8	8	-	8	-	-	-	-	-	-	-								
Kolkheti Khobi	2	7	10	-	-	-	-	-	-	7	10	-	-								
Meshakhte	2	9	9	9	-	-	-	-	-	-	-	3	-								
Shturmi	2	8	8	-	-	-	-	-	-	-	8	-									
Chikhura	1	10	10	-	-	-	-	10	-	-	-	-	-								
Dinamo Batumi	1	1	1	-	1	-	-	-	-	-	-	-	-								
Gonio	1	9	9	-	-	-	-	-	-	-	-	9	-								
Gori	1	-	-	-	-	-	-	-	-	-	-	-									
Iberia 1999 B	1	8	8	-	-	-	-	-	-	-	-	8	-								
Odishi 1919	1	-	-	-	-	-	-	-	-	-	-	-									

^{a} Expelled from the league in May 2022 for match fixing.

The current status of these clubs as of 2026:

Erovnuli Liga	6
Erovnuli Liga 2	10
Liga 3	8
Liga 4	-
Regionuli Liga	
Defunct	5

== Top goalscorers ==
Season	Top Scorers	Club	Goals
2011/12	(Georgia (country)) Iago Deisadze	Guria	14
2012/13	(Georgia (country)) Tornike Kapanadze	Samgurali	27
2013/14	(Georgia (country)) Budu Zivzivadze	Dinamo-2 Tbilisi	23
2014/15	(Georgia (country)) Mamia Gavashelishvili	Locomotive	44
2015/16	(Georgia (country)) Zurab Ghirdaladze	WIT Georgia	20
2016	(Georgia (country)) Levan Papava	Gagra	13
2017	(Georgia (country)) Data Sitchinava	Rustavi	30
2018	(Brazil) Flamarion	Dinamo Batumi	24
2019	(Georgia (country)) Giorgi Nikabadze	Merani Tbilisi	26
2020	(Georgia (country)) Toma Tabatadze	Rustavi	13
2021	(Georgia (country)) Tamaz Makatsaria	Gagra	23
2021	(Mali) Cheikne Sylla	Merani Martvili	23
2022	(Georgia (country)) Levan Papava	Spaeri	17
2023	(Georgia (country)) Levan Papava	Gareji	23
2024	(Georgia (country)) Levan Papava	Gareji	27
2025	(Uzbekistan) Javokhir Esonkulov	Merani Martvili	22

== Sponsors ==
In 2019, the Football Federation signed a sponsorship deal with Crystalbet. For this reason the league has since been formally referred to as Crystalbet Erovnuli Liga 2.
