= Bantu Mzwakali =

South African soccer player

Personal information
- Full name: Bantubonke Mzwakali
- Date of birth: 9 November 1993 (age 33)
- Place of birth: Cape Town, South Africa
- Height: 1.73 m (5 ft 8 in)
- Position: Midfielder

Team information
- Current team: Sioni
- Number: 11

Youth career
- Ajax Cape Town

Senior career*
Years	Team	Apps	(Gls)
2013–2018	Ajax Cape Town	99	(4)
2018	Chippa United	4	(0)
2018–2019	Bidvest Wits	3	(0)
2019–2020	Cape Umoya United	6	(0)
2020–2021	IK Brage	25	(0)
2021	Swallows FC	5	(0)
2022	Rustavi	23	(9)
2023	Shukura	18	(3)
2023–2024	Dila Gori	9	(1)
2024–2025	Al-Shaeib		
2025	Gareji	5	(0)
2026–	Sioni	12	(0)
- * Club domestic league appearances and goals as of 11 July 2026

Bantu Mzwakali (born 9 November 1993) is a South African football midfielder who plays for Georgian 2nd division side Sioni.

== Career ==
Mzwakali started his career with Ajax Cape Town.

He hails from Gugulethu on the Cape Flats.

=== IK Brage ===
On 23 January 2020, Mzwakali joined Swedish Superettan club IK Brage on a one-year deal.

=== Al-Shaeib ===
On 12 January 2024, Mzwakali joined Al-Shaeib.

=== Georgian Clubs ===
Mzwakali has played for five top-league and 2nd division teams in Georgia. In September 2025, he returned from Saudi Arabia to join Erovnuli Liga club Gareji, although shortly moved to Sioni.
