= Revaz Kemoklidze =

Georgian footballer

Personal information
- Full name: Revaz Kemoklidze
- Date of birth: 13 March 1979 (age 47)
- Place of birth: Tbilisi, Georgian SSR, Soviet Union
- Height: 1.87 m (6 ft 2 in)
- Position: Defender

Team information
- Current team: Spartaki Tskhinvali
- Number: 20

Senior career*
Years	Team	Apps	(Gls)
1996–1998	Dinamo Batumi	19	(0)
1998–1999	Dinamo Tbilisi	6	(0)
1999	WIT Georgia	15	(0)
1999–2000	Tbilisi	13	(0)
2000–2001	Dinamo Tbilisi	26	(1)
2001–2003	Torpedo Kutaisi	49	(0)
2003	→ Kocaelispor (loan)	9	(0)
2003–2004	Lokomotivi Tbilisi	15	(0)
2004–2005	Tbilisi	37	(1)
2005–2006	Dinamo Tbilisi	15	(0)
2006–2007	Chikhura Sachkhere	12	(0)
2007–2008	Spartaki Tskhinvali	22	(0)
2008–2010	Sioni Bolnisi	47	(1)
2010–2011	Olimpi Rustavi	24	(0)
2011	Torpedo Kutaisi	1	(0)
2012–2014	Sioni Bolnisi	44	(0)
2014–	Spartaki Tskhinvali	2	(0)

International career
2000–2004	Georgia	20	(0)
- * Club domestic league appearances and goals

Revaz Kemoklidze (Georgian: რევაზ ქემოკლიძე; born 13 March 1979) is a Georgian professional football defender.

== Club career ==
His club career started in Dinamo Tbilisi in 1997. Midway in the 2000/01 season he was bought by Torpedo Kutaisi, where he became a key player as they won the league title three consecutive seasons. He then tried his luck in Turkey with Kocaelispor, but following their relegation he returned to Georgia. Before the 2005/06 season Kemoklidze returned to Dinamo Tbilisi.

== International career ==
In addition, he was called up to the national team, where he was capped 20 times between 2000 and 2004.
