= Akaki Mikuchadze =

Georgian footballer (born 1980)

Personal information
- Full name: Akaki Mikuchadze
- Date of birth: 24 June 1980 (age 46)
- Place of birth: Georgia
- Position: Striker

Team information
- Current team: FC Sioni Bolnisi

Senior career*
Years	Team	Apps	(Gls)
2000–2002	FC Dinamo Tbilisi	24	(5)
2002–2003	FC Merani Tbilisi	9	(2)
2003–2005	FC Tbilisi	12	(1)
2005	FC Kolkheti-1913 Poti	25	(9)
2005–2006	FC Sioni Bolnisi	28	(19)
2006–2007	Hapoel Be'er Sheva	27	(8)
2007–2008	Hapoel Nazareth Illit	24	(2)
2008	FC Metalurgi Rustavi	7	(0)
2009	FC Sioni Bolnisi	9	(1)
2009–2010	Maccabi Ironi Bat Yam F.C.	31	(18)
2010–2011	Hapoel Bnei Lod	30	(5)
2011–2012	Maccabi Be'er Sheva	17	(5)
2012	Hapoel Bnei Lod	11	(3)
2013–present	FC Sioni Bolnisi	23	(6)
- * Club domestic league appearances and goals

Akaki Mikuchadze is a Georgian footballer.

== Honours ==
- Umaglesi Liga (1):
  - 2005-06
- Liga Leumit - Top Goalscorer (1):
  - 2009-10 (18 goals)
