= Rezo Dzhikiya =

Russian footballer

Personal information
- Full name: Rezo Koteyevich Dzhikiya
- Date of birth: 1 September 1980 (age 46)
- Place of birth: Irkutsk, Soviet Union
- Height: 1.80 m (5 ft 11 in)
- Position: Forward

Senior career*
Years	Team	Apps	(Gls)
1996	FC Zvezda Irkutsk	1	(0)
1997	FC Angara Angarsk	32	(6)
1998–1999	FC Zvezda Irkutsk	58	(14)
2000–2001	FC Chkalovets-Olimpik Novosibirsk	34	(6)
2001	FC Lokomotiv Chita	0	(0)
2002–2004	FC Zvezda Irkutsk	57	(25)
2004–2005	FC Torpedo Kutaisi	17	(5)
2005	FC Borjomi	9	(0)
2006–2007	FC Dinamo Batumi	20	(7)
2007–2008	FC Olimpi Rustavi	13	(6)
2008	FC Anzhi Makhachkala	32	(5)
2009	FC Baia Zugdidi	12	(4)
2010	FC Olimpi Rustavi	10	(1)
2010	FC Kolkheti-1913 Poti	11	(1)
2011	FC Sioni Bolnisi	15	(5)
2011	FC Spartaki Tskhinvali	16	(2)
2012	FC Dila Gori	10	(1)
2012	FC Sioni Bolnisi	18	(6)
2013–2014	FC Sasco Tbilisi	14	(5)
- * Club domestic league appearances and goals

Rezo Dzhikiya (Georgian: რეზო ჯიქია; Russian: Резо Котеевич Джикия; born 1 September 1980) is a former Russian footballer of Georgian descent.

== Club career ==
He made his Russian Football National League debut for FC Zvezda Irkutsk on 8 June 1996 in a game against FC Okean Nakhodka. He later played 1 more season in the FNL for FC Anzhi Makhachkala.

He spent 10 out of last 11 seasons of his career in Georgia.

== Honours ==
- Russian Second Division He was the top scorer for Zone East in 2003 with 13 goals.
