= 1992–93 Pirveli Liga =

The 1992–93 Pirveli Liga was the fourth season of the Georgian Pirveli Liga, the second division of Georgian Football. The season saw 16 teams in competition which consists of reserve and professional teams.

Shukura Kobuleti finished the season as champions, two points ahead of runners-up Magaroeli Chiatura. They along with third place Sapovnela Terjola were promoted to the Umaglesi Liga, Georgia's top-flight football division.

== League standings ==
| Pos | Team | Pld | W | D | L | GF | GA | GD | Pts | Promotion |
|---|---|---|---|---|---|---|---|---|---|---|
| 1 | Shukura Kobuleti (C, P) | 30 | 24 | 1 | 5 | 59 | 30 | +29 | 73 | Promotion to Umaglesi Liga |
| 2 | Magaroeli Chiatura (P) | 30 | 22 | 5 | 3 | 78 | 34 | +44 | 71 | Promotion to Umaglesi Liga |
| 3 | Sapovnela Terjola (P) | 30 | 20 | 1 | 9 | 63 | 38 | +25 | 61 | Promotion to Umaglesi Liga |
| 4 | Meshakhte Tkibuli | 30 | 17 | 2 | 11 | 50 | 45 | +5 | 53 | |
| 5 | Sioni Bolnisi | 30 | 15 | 3 | 12 | 77 | 48 | +29 | 48 | |
| 6 | Armazi Mtskheta | 30 | 13 | 5 | 12 | 55 | 47 | +8 | 44 | |
| 7 | Aragvi Dusheti | 30 | 13 | 5 | 12 | 49 | 39 | +10 | 44 | |
| 8 | Mertskhali Ozurgeti | 30 | 14 | 1 | 15 | 66 | 67 | −1 | 43 | |
| 9 | Armazi-90 Tbilisi | 30 | 12 | 5 | 13 | 55 | 59 | −4 | 41 | |
| 10 | Duruji Kvareli | 30 | 12 | 4 | 14 | 48 | 42 | +6 | 40 | |
| 11 | Imereti Khoni | 30 | 13 | 0 | 17 | 45 | 64 | −19 | 39 | |
| 12 | Guria-2 Lanchkhuti | 30 | 12 | 3 | 15 | 56 | 70 | −14 | 39 | |
| 13 | Bakhtrioni Akhmeta | 30 | 12 | 3 | 15 | 43 | 60 | −17 | 39 | |
| 14 | Sulori Vani | 30 | 12 | 0 | 18 | 60 | 65 | −5 | 36 | |
| 15 | Kartli Gori | 30 | 7 | 0 | 23 | 40 | 66 | −26 | 21 | |
| 16 | Merani Tbilisi | 30 | 2 | 2 | 26 | 17 | 87 | −70 | 8 | |

Source: RSSSF
(C) Champions; (P) Promoted

== See also ==
- 1992–93 Umaglesi Liga
- 1992–93 Georgian Cup
