= 2021 Erovnuli Liga 2 =

Erovnuli Liga 2
- Season: 2021
- Dates: 1 March – 3 December 2021
- Champions: Sioni
- Promoted: Sioni; Gagra
- Relegated: Chikhura
- Matches: 180
- Goals: 541 (3.01 per match)
- Top goalscorer: Cheikne Sylla (Merani M); Tamaz Makatsaria (Gagra) (23 goals)
- Biggest home win: Gareji 8–0 Chikhura (27 November)
- Biggest away win: Chikhura 0–6 Merani M (3 December)
- Highest scoring: Merani Tb 3–5 Sioni (24 June); Rustavi 5–3 Shevardeni (27 November); Gareji 8–0 Chikhura (3 December)
- Longest winning run: Sioni (7)
- Longest winless run: Chikhura (27)
- Longest losing run: Chikhura (10)
- All statistics correct as of complete.

The 2021 Erovnuli Liga 2 was the fifth season under its current title and the 33rd season of second tier football in Georgia. The season began on 1 March and ended on 3 December.

== Team changes ==
The following teams have changed division since the 2020 season:

=== To Erovnuli Liga 2 ===
Promoted from Liga 3

• Gareji

Relegated from Erovnuli Liga

• Chikhura

• Merani Tbilisi

=== From Erovnuli Liga 2 ===
Promoted to Erovnuli Liga

• Shukura

• Samgurali

Relegated to Liga 3

• Aragvi

== Teams and stadiums ==
Locations of the 2021 Erovnuli Liga 2 teams.

Team	Location	Venue	Capacity
Chikhura	Sachkhere	Centraluri	2,000
Dinamo Zugdidi	Ganmukhuri	Central Stadium	2,000
Gagra	Tbilisi	Zghvis Baza	1,000
Gareji	Sagarejo	Centraluri	2,000
Merani Martvili	Martvili	Murtaz Khurtsilava Stadium	2,000
Merani Tbilisi	Tbilisi	Spaeri Stadium	2,500
Rustavi	Rustavi	Teknikuri Centri	1,000
Shevardeni 1906	Kaspi	Tsentraluri	500
Sioni	Bolnisi	Tamaz Stepania Stadium	3,242
WIT Georgia	Tbilisi	Gldanis safexburto centri	1,000

== League table ==
Pos	Team	Pld	W	D	L	GF	GA	GD	Pts	Promotion, qualification or relegation
1	Sioni (C, P)	36	26	3	7	74	36	+38	81	Promotion to Erovnuli Liga
2	Gagra (P)	36	22	9	5	74	27	+47	75	Qualification for the Promotion play-offs
3	Merani Martvili	36	19	7	10	65	44	+21	64	Qualification for the Promotion play-offs
4	Gareji	36	15	5	16	52	48	+4	50	
5	Merani Tbilisi	36	12	11	13	58	58	0	47	
6	Shevardeni 1906	36	12	10	14	63	58	+5	46	
7	Dinamo Zugdidi	36	14	4	18	47	71	−24	46	
8	WIT Georgia	36	10	15	11	38	43	−5	45	Qualification to Relegation play-offs
9	Rustavi	36	11	6	19	46	58	−12	39	Qualification to Relegation play-offs
10	Chikhura (R)	36	2	4	30	24	98	−74	10	Relegation to Liga 3

Source: eliga.ge
Rules for classification: 1) Points; 2) Head-to-head points; 3) Head-to-head goal difference; 4) Head-to-head goals scored; 5) Head-to-head away goals scored (only if two teams); 6) Goal difference; 7) Goals scored.
(C) Champions; (P) Promoted; (R) Relegated

== Results ==
=== Regular season ===
==== Round 1-18 ====
Home \ Away	CHI	ZUG	GAG	GAR	MAR	MER	RUS	SHE	SIO	WIT
Chikhura	—	1–3	0–4	0–2	1–2	1–5	2–0	0–1	2–5	1–1
Dinamo Z	2–0	—	1–5	2–1	2–5	2–1	2–1	2–0	0–2	0–2
Gagra	1–1	4–0	—	3–0	3–0	3–0	3–1	2–0	1–0	0–2
Gareji	2–0	3–0	0–1	—	1–0	3–2	0–3	2–0	3–0	3–2
Merani M	3–2	1–0	1–3	3–1	—	2–0	2–0	1–1	1–2	4–1
Merani Tbilisi	2–0	3–0	4–3	0–0	1–1	—	2–1	0–0	3–5	0–0
Rustavi	3–1	0–0	0–0	3–2	0–2	0–3	—	0–0	0–1	2–0
Shevardeni 1906	4–0	5–2	1–1	1–0	1–2	2–2	4–1	—	0–2	1–1
Sioni	2–0	2–1	0–1	2–0	2–2	2–1	3–0	3–0	—	0–1
WIT Georgia	1–0	1–2	0–2	0–0	2–1	1–1	1–1	0–0	0–3	—

Source: Liga 2 results
Legend: Blue = home team win; Yellow = draw; Red = away team win.

==== Round 19-36 ====
Home \ Away	CHI	ZUG	GAG	GAR	MAR	MER	RUS	SHE	SIO	WIT
Chikhura	—	1–1	0–4	0–3	0–6	3–2	0–3	1–3	2–5	1–1
Dinamo Z	2–1	—	2–1	3–0	0–3	1–4	4–2	0–1	2–1	2–1
Gagra	2–0	4–1	—	3–0	1–1	3–1	2–0	5–2	1–1	1–1
Gareji	8–0	1–1	1–2	—	3–2	3–0	3–0	1–1	0–1	1–1
Merani M	3–1	1–1	1–0	1–0	—	1–3	1–0	3–1	4–2	0–2
Merani Tbilisi	2–1	0–4	1–1	1–2	2–1	—	1–1	5–2	2–1	0–0
Rustavi	1–0	3–0	0–1	2–1	0–0	2–1	—	5–3	1–3	5–1
Shevardeni 1906	6–1	4–1	1–1	5–0	1–2	5–2	4–3	—	0–1	1–3
Sioni	2–0	2–1	2–1	2–0	3–1	0–0	3–2	3–2	—	4–0
WIT Georgia	1–0	4–0	1–1	1–2	1–1	1–1	2–0	0–0	1–2	—

Source: Liga 2 results
Legend: Blue = home team win; Yellow = draw; Red = away team win.

=== Relegation play-offs ===
First leg

7 December 2021
13:00 UTC+4

Tbilisi City	2–3	WIT Georgia
Tatanashvili 26', 72'	Report	Zaridze 11'; Nachkebia 69'; Muzashvili 73'

Gldanis Safexbutro Centri, Tbilisi
Referee: K.Giorgadze

Second leg

11 December 2021
13:00 UTC+4

WIT Georgia	2–1	Tbilisi City
Muzashvili 20'; Nachkebia 45'	Report	Tatanashvili 27'

Gldanis Safexbutro Centri, Tbilisi
Referee: B.Ninua

WIT Georgia won 5–3 on aggregate.

7 December 2021
15:00 UTC+4

Rustavi	0–0	Kolkheti 1913
	Report

Teknikuri Centri, Rustavi
Referee: B.Ninua
11 December 2021
13:00 UTC+4

Kolkheti 1913	1–1 (a.e.t.)	Rustavi
Chavchanidze 110' (o.g.)	Report	Kurmashvili 100'

Fazisi Stadium, Poti
Referee: I.Kherkhadze

Rustavi won on the away goals rule.

== Statistics ==
=== Top scorers ===
Rank	Player	Club	Goals
1	(Mali) Cheikne Sylla	Merani Martvili	23
1	(Georgia (country)) Tamaz Makatsaria	Gagra	23
3	(Georgia (country)) Giorgi Kharebashvili	Gareji	20
3	(Georgia (country)) Data Sitchinava	Sioni	20

=== Hat-tricks ===
Player	For	Against	Result	Date
(Georgia (country)) Giorgi Kharebashvili	Gareji	WIT Georgia	3–2 (H)	8 June
(Georgia (country)) Giorgi Kharebashvili	Gareji	Rustavi	3–0 (H)	5 July
(Georgia (country)) Giorgi Kharebashvili	Gareji	Chikhura	8–0*(H)	27 November
(Georgia (country)) Tamaz Makatsaria	Gagra	Merani Tb	3–0 (H)	20 March
(Georgia (country)) Tamaz Makatsaria	Gagra	Shevardeni	5–2**(H)	21 November
(Georgia (country)) Zviad Metreveli	Merani Tb	Sioni	3–5 (H)	24 June
(Georgia (country)) Data Sitchinava	Sioni	Chikhura	2–5 (A)	21 November
(Mali) Cheikne Sylla	Merani M	Chikhura	0–6 (A)	3 December

Note:

- *Player scored 6 goals
- ** Player scored 4 goals

(H) – Home team

(A) – Away team

=== Clean sheets ===
Rank	Player	Club	Clean sheets
1	(Georgia (country)) Davit Kereselidze	Gagra	15
2	(Georgia (country)) Guram Chikashua	WIT Georgia	13
3	(Georgia (country)) Konstantine Sepiashvili	Sioni	12
4	(Ukraine) Bohdan Bezkrovnyi	Gareji	11

=== Discipline ===
Player

Most red cards - 2

• Beka Kharshiladze (Rustavi)

• Guram Samushia (Gagra)

• Lasha Ugrekhelidze (Sioni)

Club

Most red cards - 4

• Rustavi

=== Awards ===
Round	Manager of the Round		Player of the Round		Ref
1-9	(Georgia (country)) Varlam Kilasonia	Sioni	(Georgia (country)) Tamaz Makatsaria	Gagra	
10-18	(Georgia (country)) Gaga Kirkitadze	Gagra	(Georgia (country)) Ivane Khabelashvili	Gagra	
19-27	(Georgia (country)) Gaga Kirkitadze	Gagra	(Georgia (country)) Zviad Sikharulia	Merani M	
28-36	(Georgia (country)) Tsotne Moniava	Merani M	(Georgia (country)) Data Sitchinava	Sioni	
