= 2014–15 Umaglesi Liga =

Umaglesi Liga
- Season: 2014–15
- Dates: 9 August 2014 – 27 May 2015
- Champions: Dila Gori; 1st Georgian title
- Relegated: Metalurgi Rustavi; WIT Georgia; Zestaponi
- Champions League: Dila Gori
- Europa League: Dinamo Batumi; Dinamo Tbilisi; Spartaki-Tskhinvali Tbilisi
- Matches: 240
- Goals: 596 (2.48 per match)
- Top goalscorer: Irakli Modebadze (16)

The 2014–15 Umaglesi Liga was the 26th season of top-tier football in Georgia. The season began on 9 August 2014 and ended on 27 May 2015.

== Teams ==
=== Stadiums and locations ===
Locations of teams in the 2014–15 Umaglesi Liga

Team	Location	Venue	Capacity
Chikhura	Sachkhere	Givi Kiladze Stadium	14,700
Dila Gori	Gori	Tengiz Burjanadze Stadium	5,000
Dinamo Batumi	Kobuleti	Chele Arena	6,000
Dinamo Tbilisi	Tbilisi	Boris Paichadze Stadium	54,549
Guria Lanchkhuti	Lanchkhuti	Evgrapi Shevardnadze Stadium	22,000
Kolkheti Poti	Poti	Fazisi Stadium	6,000
Merani Martvili	Martvili	Erosi Manjgaladze Stadium	2,000
Metalurgi Rustavi	Rustavi	Poladi Stadium	6,000
Samtredia	Samtredia	Erosi Manjgaladze Stadium	15,000
Shukura Kobuleti	Kobuleti	Chele Arena	6,000
Sioni Bolnisi	Bolnisi	Mikheil Meskhi Stadium	27,223
Spartaki-Tskhinvali Tbilisi	Tskhinvali	Mikheil Meskhi Stadium	27,223
Torpedo Kutaisi	Kutaisi	Givi Kiladze Stadium	14,700
WIT Georgia	Mtskheta	Mtskheta Park	2,000
Zestaponi	Zestaponi	David Abashidze Stadium	4,558
Zugdidi	Zugdidi	Anaklia Stadium	1,000

=== Kit manufacturer and sponsor ===
Team	Kit manufacturer	Sponsors
Chikhura	Saller	
Dila Gori	Saller	Lider-Bet
Dinamo Batumi	Saller	
Dinamo Tbilisi	Adidas	
Guria Lanchkhuti	Saller	
Kolkheti Poti	Umbro	APM Terminals
Merani Martvili	Joma	
Metalurgi Rustavi	Joma	RMP
Samtredia	Nike	
Shukura Kobuleti	Umbro	EZA
Sioni Bolnisi	Adidas	
Spartaki-Tskhinvali Tbilisi	Saller	
Torpedo Kutaisi	Jako	Wissol
WIT Georgia	Uhlsport	ZooPlaza
Zestaponi	Puma	Nirpa Ferro
Zugdidi	Saller	

== League table ==
Pos	Team	Pld	W	D	L	GF	GA	GD	Pts	Qualification or relegation
1	Dila Gori (C)	30	19	7	4	50	23	+27	64	Qualification for the Champions League second qualifying round
2	Dinamo Batumi	30	18	4	8	40	24	+16	58 (Note: Head-to-head record: Dinamo Tbilisi–Dinamo Batumi 0–1, Dinamo Batumi-Dinamo Tbilisi 0–0.)	Qualification for the Europa League first qualifying round (Note: Since winners of the 2014–15 Georgian Cup, Dinamo Tbilisi, qualified for Europa League based on league position, the spot awarded to the Cup winner was passed to the best team in the table not already qualified for any European competition (in this case, the fourth-placed team).)
3	Dinamo Tbilisi	30	17	7	6	56	28	+28	58	Qualification for the Europa League first qualifying round
4	Spartaki Tskhinvali	30	16	5	9	47	37	+10	53	Qualification for the Europa League first qualifying round
5	Chikhura Sachkhere	30	13	7	10	39	36	+3	46	
6	Samtredia	30	13	6	11	40	31	+9	45	
7	Shukura Kobuleti	30	11	8	11	36	38	−2	41 (Note: Head-to-head record: Shukura Kobuleti-Torpedo Kutaisi 2–1, Torpedo Kutaisi–Shukura Kobuleti 0–2.)	
8	Torpedo Kutaisi	30	10	11	9	39	33	+6	41	
9	Guria Lanchkhuti	30	10	9	11	38	43	−5	39	
10	Kolkheti Poti	30	9	10	11	31	31	0	37	
11	Merani Martvili	30	9	9	12	29	33	−4	36	
12	Zugdidi	30	8	9	13	24	45	−21	33	
13	Sioni Bolnisi	30	9	5	16	32	46	−14	32	
14	Metalurgi Rustavi (R)	30	6	8	16	25	46	−21	26 (Note: Head-to-head record: WIT Georgia–Metalurgi Rustavi 0–2, Metalurgi Rustavi-WIT Georgia 0–0.)	Qualification to Relegation play-offs
15	WIT Georgia (R)	30	7	5	18	29	40	−11	26	Relegation to Pirveli Liga
16	Zestaponi (Note: Zestaponi were officially withdrawn from the league on 20 April 2015) (R)	30	6	8	16	40	61	−21	26	Team expelled

Source: uefa.com
Rules for classification: 1) points; 2) head-to-head points; 3) head-to-head goal difference; 4) head-to-head goals scored; 5) head-to-head away goals (only with 2 tied teams); 6) goal difference; 7) goals scored
(C) Champions; (R) Relegated

== Results ==
Home \ Away	CHI	DIL	DBA	DIN	GUR	KOL	MER	MET	SAM	SHU	SIO	STT	TKU	WIT	ZES	ZUG
Chikhura Sachkhere		2–1	0–1	1–0	2–1	5–1	2–0	2–1	2–1	0–2	2–0	1–3	2–2	2–0	2–1	1–0
Dila Gori	2–1		0–1	0–0	2–0	1–0	1–0	3–2	1–0	5–2	1–0	2–0	2–1	3–0	2–2	4–0
Dinamo Batumi	0–0	1–0		0–0	2–1	1–0	3–1	2–0	1–0	0–0	2–1	0–1	2–3	2–1	3–0	2–0
Dinamo Tbilisi	3–0	2–2	0–1		1–2	2–1	0–0	2–0	2–0	6–0	1–0	6–1	3–2	3–0	3–2	7–0
Guria Lanchkhuti	2–2	0–0	1–0	2–2		3–2	1–0	1–0	3–1	0–0	0–0	1–1	1–3	4–1	1–0	5–0
Kolkheti Poti	1–0	0–1	0–2	0–0	0–1		3–0	3–0	0–0	2–2	1–0	1–1	0–3	2–1	4–0	1–1
Merani Martvili	2–0	1–1	1–2	1–1	1–0	0–0		3–0	0–0	1–0	2–0	0–2	3–1	0–2	3–0	0–0
Metalurgi Rustavi	0–0	0–2	2–1	3–0	0–0	1–0	1–2		1–1	1–3	1–2	1–1	1–1	0–0	2–2	0–1
Samtredia	3–1	0–1	2–0	0–1	3–1	1–1	4–2	2–1		4–1	3–1	3–1	0–1	1–0	3–0	0–1
Shukura Kobuleti	1–1	3–0	1–3	0–1	2–0	1–1	1–3	0–1	0–1		1–1	0–0	2–1	2–0	3–1	2–1
Sioni Bolnisi	1–0	1–4	1–0	2–1	3–2	1–2	1–0	3–1	2–2	1–3		3–4	1–0	0–0	1–3	0–0
Spartaki Tskhinvali	2–1	0–1	0–1	4–1	3–0	1–2	1–0	7–2	2–1	1–0	2–1		0–0	1–0	3–0	2–1
Torpedo Kutaisi	1–2	0–0	2–2	1–2	2–2	0–0	1–1	0–1	3–1	0–2	1–0	2–0		1–0	3–3	0–0
WIT Georgia	1–2	2–2	2–0	0–1	2–2	1–0	2–2	0–2	0–1	0–1	2–0	0–1	0–1		2–3	2–0
Zestaponi	2–2	0–3	2–4	2–3	6–0	1–1	0–0	2–0	0–1	1–1	4–2	3–0	0–3	0–3		0–3
Zugdidi	1–1	0–3	2–1	1–2	2–1	0–2	3–0	0–0	1–1	1–0	1–3	3–2	0–0	1–3	0–0	

Source: Soccerway
Legend: Blue = home team win; Yellow = draw; Red = away team win.

== Relegation play-offs ==
A match was played between the 14th placed (Metalurgi Rustavi) team in the 2014–15 Umaglesi Liga and the promotion play-off winner (Lokomotivi Tbilisi) from the 2014–15 Pirveli Liga. The winner earned a place in the 2015–16 Umaglesi Liga.

27 May 2015
16:30

Metalurgi Rustavi	0–5	Lokomotivi Tbilisi
	Report	Narimanidze 15' (o.g.); Gavashelishvili 29'; Gagnidze 49' (pen.), 53'; Chikhladze 72'

Mikheil Meskhi Stadium small field, Tbilisi
Attendance: 2,000
Referee: Giorgi Vadatchkoria

== Top goalscorers ==
Rank	Goalscorer	Team	Goals
1	(Georgia (country)) Irakli Modebadze	Dila Gori	16
2	(Georgia (country)) Giorgi Papunashvili	Dinamo Tbilisi	14
3	(Georgia (country)) Nika Kacharava	Spartaki-Tskhinvali	12
4	(Georgia (country)) Data Sitchinava	Kolkheti Poti	11
5	(Georgia (country)) Jaba Dvali	Zestaponi	10
5	(Georgia (country)) Otar Kvernadze	Torpedo Kutaisi	10
7	(Georgia (country)) Giorgi Beriashvili	Dinamo Batumi	9
7	(Georgia (country)) Shota Lomia	Zugdidi	9
9	(Georgia (country)) Lasha Shindagoridze	Spartaki-Tskhinvali	8

== See also ==
- 2014–15 Pirveli Liga
- 2014–15 Georgian Cup
