= FC Gareji Sagarejo =

Association football club in Georgia

Gareji Sagarejo
- Founded: 1960; 66 years ago
- Ground: Central stadium, Sagarejo
- Capacity: 2,000
- Chairman: Lazare Datunashvili
- Coach: Tamaz Pertia
- League: Erovnuli Liga 2
- 2025: 9th in Erovnuli Liga (relegated)
- Website: fcgareji.ge
Home colours	Away colours

FC Gareji 1960 (Georgian: საფეხბურთო კლუბი გარეჯი 1960), commonly referred to as Gareji, is a Georgian football club from Sagarejo. Following the 2025 season, they were relegated to the Erovnuli Liga 2, the 2nd tier of Georgian football.

The team first made headlines after achieving three consecutive promotions in 2018–20. In 2025, Gareji participated in the top flight for the first time in their history.

The Central stadium located in Sagarejo is their home ground.

== History ==
=== League ===
Established in 1960, during the Soviet period, Gareji participated in the Georgian Republican Championship for many years. After 1990, they spent several seasons in the second and third divisions.

Their recent rise started from Regionuli Liga in 2018. After winning the Eastern Group, Gareji secured an easy win in a home-and-away play-off tie against their Liga 3 opponents. As members of the newly created Liga 4, they finished just below the promotion zone, which was still widely regarded as a success for the debutants. However, after Tskhinvali failed to fulfill their financial obligations, they were expelled from Liga 3 and replaced by Gareji, who filled the vacuum as the 3rd-placed team.

During the 2020 Liga 3 season, under head coach Tengiz Kobiashvili, the newly promoted club performed strongly and remained among the top teams throughout the campaign. The team won 14 of its 18 matches and secured promotion. As a result, Gareji advanced from the fifth division to Liga 2 within a relatively short period.

Once in the second league, for most of 2021 Gareji were still aiming for promotion, competing with Merani Martvili for a third qualifying place. Ultimately, the latter gained the upper hand, although Gareji recorded some impressive victories, including 8–0, which was the biggest win of the season for any Liga 2 team. Forward Giorgi Kharebashvili shined in this match by scoring six times.

During the 2023 season, the club seemed clear favourites to gain yet another promotion with going eleven points clear of immediate rivals at one point in June. However, Kolkheti 1913 managed to close the gap and finish atop the league table after a 1–1 draw in a crunch game held in Sagarejo on the final day of the season. Gareji could have still advanced to the top flight via play-offs, but suffered a 5–4 aggregate defeat at the hands of Samtredia. Their striker Levan Papava finished this season as the league top scorer with 23 goals.

Papava improved his statistics in the 2024 season to win the same title again. This season, the club made history after winning a tight contest for promotion to the top tier. Despite a disappointing start to the season (five points in six matches), Gareji avoided dropping points in the crucial periods of the season for once and secured the title after a 3–2 away win at Kolkheti Khobi with a game still in hand.

Because stadiums with artificial turf are prohibited under Erovnuli Liga regulations, Gareji became the only team in 2025 forced to move to another city. The club chose the Mikheil Meskhi Stadium in Tbilisi, located 60 km away from Sagarejo, as their temporary football ground. They shared points with Dinamo Batumi in their first top-tier game held on March 6th. Cameroonian striker François Ekongolo scored Gareji's first ever top-flight goal against Samgurali, despite them losing 3–1. Eventually, Gareji were relegated after a narrow defeat in League 1/2 playoffs.

=== Georgian Cup ===
In 2019, Gareji became the first ever 4th division team in Georgian football history to reach the semifinals of the Georgian Cup. Head coach Davit Kokiashvili quit Gareji two days prior to the game, affecting the club's morale, but they offered Locomotive Tbilisi a decent resistance during the entire match. Despite taking the lead after the first 45 minutes, Gareji eventually lost after conceding the third goal from the penalty spot.

The next year Gareji were eliminated by Samgurali, the eventual runners-up of the Cup.

The team reached the quarterfinals in 2021 where they lost to future Cup winners Saburtalo in the dying minutes of the game.

In 2024, Gareji knocked out two top-tier teams, including league leaders Dila, but they eventually crashed out in the quarterfinals following a narrow extra-time defeat at the hands of Kolkheti 1913.

== Seasons ==
Year	Division	Pos	M	W	D	L	GF–GA	Pts	Notes	Cup
2014/15	Meore Liga East	6_{/15}	28	14	4	10	63-52	46		
2015/16	Meore Liga East	6_{/14}	26	14	2	10	64-52	44		
2016	Meore Liga Group D	3_{/8}	14	8	0	6	43-34	24	Relegated	
2017	Regionuli Liga East B	4_{/11}	24	13	3	8	52-39	42		1/16 finals
2018	Regionuli Liga East D	1_{/11} (Note: Beat Mark Stars 7–1 on aggregate in Regliga/Liga 3 play-offs)	20	15	3	2	84-29	48	Promoted	1/16 finals
2019	Liga 4	3_{/10}	27	17	6	4	66-34	57	Promoted	1/2 finals
2020	Liga 3	1_{/10}	18	14	1	3	33-17	43	Promoted	1/8 finals
2021	Erovnuli Liga 2	4_{/10}	36	15	5	16	52-48	50		1/4 finals
2022	Erovnuli Liga 2	5_{/10}	28	10	6	12	38-36	36		1/16 finals
2023	Erovnuli Liga 2	2_{/10} (Note: Lost to Samtredia 5–4 on aggregate in Liga 1/2 play-offs)	36	23	7	6	88-38	76		1/8 finals
2024	Erovnuli Liga 2	1_{/10}	36	19	10	7	77–44	67	Promoted	1/4 finals
2025	Erovnuli Liga	9_{/10} (Note: Lost to Spaeri 3–2 on aggregate in Liga 1/2 play-offs)	36	7	13	16	41–54	34	Relegated	1/16 finals

== Squad ==
As of 15 March 2026

Note: Flags indicate national team as defined under FIFA eligibility rules; some limited exceptions apply. Players may hold more than one non-FIFA nationality.

No.	Pos.	Nation	Player
1	GK	GEO	Aleksandre Liparteliani
3	DF	GEO	Nikoloz Chokheli
4	DF	GEO	Luka Tolordava
5	DF	GEO	Giorgi Nikolaishvili
6	DF	GEO	Nikoloz Gogokhia
7	FW	GEO	Mate Kometiani
8	MF	GEO	Giorgi Tsetskhladze
9	FW	GEO	Nikoloz Gelashvili
10	FW	GEO	Tamaz Babunadze
11	MF	GEO	Dachi Aidarashvili
12	GK	GEO	Giorgi Bediashvili
14	FW	GEO	Ilia Chikaidze
15	DF	GEO	Tornike Kapanadze

No.	Pos.	Nation	Player
17	MF	GEO	Lasha Kalandadze
19	MF	BIH	Ajlan Karalic
20	MF	TOG	Pierre Hounlete
21	MF	GEO	Nikoloz Ninidze
22	MF	GEO	Nikoloz Grigalashvili
23	MF	GEO	Ilia Gulisashvili
24	DF	GEO	Giorgi Samadashvili
25	MF	GEO	Nikoloz Jikia
26	DF	GEO	Zurab Eradze
27	FW	GEO	Saba Gozalishvili
29	FW	GEO	Beka Gugberidze
30	DF	GEO	Davit Zurabiani

== Top goalscorers ==
Season	Div.	Player	Goals
2021	2nd	(Georgia (country)) Giorgi Kharebashvili	20
2022	2nd	(Georgia (country)) Giorgi Kharebashvili	14
2023	2nd	(Georgia (country)) Levan Papava	23
2024	2nd	(Georgia (country)) Levan Papava	27
2025	1st	(Georgia (country)) Levan Papava	11

== Managers ==
Name	Nat.	From	To
Davit Kokiashvili	(Georgia (country))	March 2019	October 2019
Davit Maisuradze	(Georgia (country))	October 2019	December 2019
Tengiz Kobiashvili	(Georgia (country))	January 2020	December 2021
Kakha Gogichaishvili	(Georgia (country))	January 2022	April 2022
Nestor Mumladze (interim)	(Georgia (country))	April 2022	May 2022
Temur Makharadze	(Georgia (country))	May 2022	June 2022
Davit Dighmelashvili	(Georgia (country))	June 2022	September 2022
Giorgi Oniani	(Georgia (country))	September 2022	June 2023
Denys Khomutov	(Ukraine)	July 2023	December 2023
Nestor Mumladze	(Georgia (country))	January 2024	May 2024
Tengiz Kobiashvili (2)	(Georgia (country))	May 2024	April 2025
Giorgi Mikadze	(Georgia (country))	April 2025	January 2026
Tengiz Kobiashvili (3)	(Georgia (country))	February 2026	June 2026
Lasha Pirtskhalaishvili	(Georgia (country))	July 2026	August 2026
Tamaz Pertia	(Georgia (country))	August 2026	

== Honours ==
• Erovnuli Liga 2

Champions: 2024

Runners-up: 2023

• Meore Liga / Liga 3

Winners: 2020

• Regionuli Liga

Winners: 2018 (Group East D)

== Other teams ==
Gareji also have a reserve team, which participates in Group A of Regionuli Liga. This team is Gareji II.

== Stadium ==
Gareji's home arena is the Central stadium with the capacity of 2,000 seats, which sustained major reconstruction works in 2018.

== Name ==
Gareji is the name of ancient rock-hewn St.David monastery complex, situated in the southern semi-desert part of the Sagarejo minicipality, which is inscribed on the club emblem.
