= 2023 Erovnuli Liga 2 =

Georgian second tier football season

Erovnuli Liga 2
- Season: 2023
- Dates: 28 February – 2 December
- Champions: Kolkheti Poti
- Promoted: Kolkheti Poti
- Relegated: Merani Martvili; Merani Tbilisi
- Matches: 180
- Goals: 579 (3.22 per match)
- Top goalscorer: Levan Papava (23 goals)
- Biggest home win: Sioni 9–1 Merani M (27 November)
- Biggest away win: Merani T 0–7 Kolkheti Poti (21 October)
- Highest scoring: Sioni 8–4 Merani T (3 November)
- Longest winning run: Kolkheti Poti (8 games)
- Longest unbeaten run: Kolkheti Poti (17)
- Longest winless run: Merani Tbilisi (27)
- Longest losing run: Merani Tbilisi (14)
- All statistics correct as of complete.

The 2023 Erovnuli Liga 2 season was the seventh edition under its current title and the 35th edition of second tier football in Georgia. The four-part competition began on 28 February and ended on 2 December with playoffs completed on 10 December.

Each team played 36 matches in this season. The winner gained automatic promotion to the Erovnuli Liga, while the next two teams participate in play-offs against their top flight rivals. The bottom two entered a play-off contest against 3rd and 4th teams of Liga 3 at the end of the season. Two-legged ties were played at each side's home ground.

== Team changes ==
The following teams have changed division since the 2022 season:

=== To Erovnuli Liga 2 ===
Promoted from Liga 3

• Dinamo Tbilisi-2

• Kolkheti Poti

• Kolkheti Khobi

Relegated from Erovnuli Liga

• Sioni Bolnisi

• Locomotive Tbilisi

=== From Erovnuli Liga 2 ===
Promoted to Erovnuli Liga

• Shukura Kobuleti

• Samtredia

Relegated to Liga 3

• Rustavi

== Teams ==
Location of Liga 2 football clubs in 2023

A total of ten teams were contesting the league based on their performance in the previous year. Apart from Gareji Sagarejo, Dinamo Tbilisi-2 and Spaeri Tbilisi, all of them have previously taken part in the main division. WIT Georgia have twice become the top-tier champions.

The participant clubs are listed below in alphabetical order.

| Club | Position last season | City | Region |
|---|---|---|---|
| Dinamo-2 | 1st in Liga 3 | Tbilisi | Tbilisi |
| Gareji | 5th | Sagarejo | Kakheti |
| Kolkheti Khobi | 4th in Liga 3 | Khobi | Samegrelo-Zemo Svaneti |
| Kolkheti-1913 | 2nd in Liga 3 | Poti | Samegrelo-Zemo Svaneti |
| Lokomotivi | 10th in Erovnuli Liga | Tbilisi | Tbilisi |
| Merani Martvili | 4th | Martvili | Samegrelo-Zemo Svaneti |
| Merani Tbilisi | 6th | Tbilisi | Tbilisi |
| Sioni Bolnisi | 8th in Erovnuli Liga | Bolnisi | Kvemo Kartli |
| Spaeri | 2nd | Tbilisi | Tbilisi |
| WIT Georgia | 8th | Tbilisi | Tbilisi |

== League table ==
| Pos | Team | Pld | W | D | L | GF | GA | GD | Pts | Promotion, qualification or relegation |
|---|---|---|---|---|---|---|---|---|---|---|
| 1 | Kolkheti-1913 Poti (C, P) | 36 | 23 | 8 | 5 | 70 | 28 | +42 | 77 | Promotion to Erovnuli Liga |
| 2 | Gareji Sagarejo | 36 | 23 | 7 | 6 | 88 | 38 | +50 | 76 | Qualification for Promotion play-offs |
| 3 | Spaeri Tbilisi | 36 | 20 | 6 | 10 | 68 | 48 | +20 | 66 | Qualification for Promotion play-offs |
| 4 | Sioni Bolnisi | 36 | 18 | 5 | 13 | 68 | 46 | +22 | 59 | |
| 5 | Dinamo Tbilisi-2 | 36 | 16 | 4 | 16 | 71 | 58 | +13 | 52 | |
| 6 | WIT Georgia | 36 | 13 | 9 | 14 | 52 | 57 | −5 | 48 | |
| 7 | Kolkheti Khobi | 36 | 12 | 10 | 14 | 44 | 52 | −8 | 46 | Qualification for Relegation play-offs |
| 8 | Lokomotivi Tbilisi | 36 | 12 | 4 | 20 | 55 | 58 | −3 | 40 | Qualification for Relegation play-offs |
| 9 | Merani Martvili (R) | 36 | 6 | 8 | 22 | 34 | 84 | −50 | 26 | Relegation to Liga 3 |
| 10 | Merani Tbilisi (R) | 36 | 1 | 11 | 24 | 29 | 110 | −81 | 14 | Relegation to Liga 3 |

Rules for classification: 1) Points; 2) Head-to-head points; 3) Head-to-head goal difference; 4) Head-to-head goals scored; 5) Head-to-head away goals scored (only if two teams); 6) Goal difference; 7) Goals scored.
(C) Champions; (P) Promoted; (R) Relegated

== Results ==
=== Regular season ===
==== Round 1-18 ====
| Home \ Away | DT2 | GAR | KKH | KOL | LOC | MAR | MER | SBL | SPA | WIT |
|---|---|---|---|---|---|---|---|---|---|---|
| Dinamo-2 | — | 0–2 | 4–1 | 3–0 | 3–1 | 2–3 | 2–2 | 4–2 | 3–2 | 3–1 |
| Gareji | 2–1 | — | 4–1 | 0–1 | 3–2 | 5–1 | 0–0 | 2–0 | 5–0 | 3–0 |
| Kolkheti Khobi | 2–0 | 2–2 | — | 1–1 | 2–1 | 1–0 | 2–0 | 3–1 | 2–0 | 0–1 |
| Kolkheti Poti | 3–0 | 0–0 | 3–2 | — | 2–1 | 3–0 | 1–1 | 3–1 | 0–1 | 2–0 |
| Locomotive | 0–2 | 3–0 | 0–2 | 0–1 | — | 1–0 | 5–2 | 1–2 | 1–3 | 3–0 |
| Merani M | 1–2 | 0–2 | 0–0 | 1–2 | 1–0 | — | 0–0 | 1–0 | 1–3 | 1–0 |
| Merani Tbilisi | 0–5 | 1–6 | 0–5 | 1–1 | 3–2 | 1–1 | — | 0–2 | 0–3 | 1–1 |
| Sioni Bolnisi | 6–3 | 0–1 | 4–1 | 3–2 | 3–1 | 1–1 | 0–0 | — | 0–0 | 2–1 |
| Spaeri | 0–1 | 2–3 | 1–0 | 2–1 | 4–1 | 1–0 | 1–1 | 2–0 | — | 5–2 |
| WIT Georgia | 4–3 | 0–3 | 2–0 | 0–2 | 4–1 | 1–1 | 5–1 | 0–2 | 2–2 | — |

Source: Liga 2 results
Legend: Blue = home team win; Yellow = draw; Red = away team win.

==== Round 19-36 ====
| Home \ Away | DT2 | GAR | KKH | KOL | LOC | MAR | MER | SBL | SPA | WIT |
|---|---|---|---|---|---|---|---|---|---|---|
| Dinamo-2 | — | 0–1 | 6–0 | 0–2 | 1–1 | 4–2 | 3–0 | 1–2 | 2–3 | 0–1 |
| Gareji | 2–3 | — | 4–0 | 1–1 | 2–1 | 6–1 | 5–1 | 1–1 | 3–2 | 4–4 |
| Kolkheti Khobi | 2–1 | 1–1 | — | 3–3 | 1–2 | 0–0 | 2–0 | 0–2 | 1–0 | 1–1 |
| Kolkheti Poti | 2–1 | 2–1 | 2–0 | — | 2–0 | 2–0 | 6–1 | 1–0 | 2–0 | 1–0 |
| Locomotive | 3–1 | 1–3 | 2–1 | 1–1 | — | 5–0 | 5–0 | 1–2 | 1–1 | 3–1 |
| Merani M | 2–2 | 1–4 | 0–2 | 0–4 | 2–2 | — | 4–2 | 0–2 | 1–2 | 1–4 |
| Merani Tbilisi | 0–3 | 1–2 | 1–1 | 0–7 | 0–2 | 0–3 | — | 0–4 | 1–5 | 2–3 |
| Sioni Bolnisi | 0–1 | 2–0 | 2–1 | 1–1 | 0–1 | 9–1 | 8–4 | — | 0–2 | 1–2 |
| Spaeri | 3–1 | 0–5 | 0–0 | 1–0 | 2–0 | 7–3 | 4–1 | 2–1 | — | 2–2 |
| WIT Georgia | 0–0 | 2–0 | 1–1 | 1–3 | 1–0 | 2–0 | 1–1 | 1–2 | 1–0 | — |

Source: Liga 2 results
Legend: Blue = home team win; Yellow = draw; Red = away team win.

== Season statistics ==
=== Top scorers ===
As of 2 December 2023

| Rank | Player | Club | Goals |
|---|---|---|---|
| 1 | (Georgia (country)) Levan Papava | Gareji Sagarejo | 23 |
| 2 | (Georgia (country)) Giorgi Kharebashvili | Gareji Sagarejo | 18 |
| 3 | (Georgia (country)) Data Sitchinava | Kolkheti Poti | 17 |
| 4 | (Georgia (country)) Amiran Dzagania | WIT Georgia | 15 |

=== Most assists ===
As of 2 December 2023

| Rank | Player | Club | Assists |
|---|---|---|---|
| 1 | (Georgia (country)) Beka Gabiskiria | Gareji | 15 |
| 2 | (Georgia (country)) Giorgi Kharebashvili | Gareji | 11 |
| 3 | (Georgia (country)) Tornike Shekiladze | WIT Georgia | 10 |

=== Clean sheets ===
As of 2 December 2023

| Rank | Player | Club | Clean sheets |
|---|---|---|---|
| 1 | (Ukraine) Yaroslav Kotlyarov | Kolkheti Poti | 15 |
| 2 | (Georgia (country)) Nika Jokhadze | Kolkheti Khobi | 10 |
| 3 | (Georgia (country)) Davit Kupatadze | Gareji | 10 |
| 4 | (Georgia (country)) Bukhuti Putkaradze | Spaeri | 10 |
| 5 | (Georgia (country)) Levan Isiani | Sioni Bolnisi | 8 |

=== Discipline ===
As of 2 December 2023

Most red cards: 3

• Merani Martvili

• Sioni Bolnisi

• Spaeri

• WIT Georgia

== Promotion playoffs ==
6 December
17:00 GET

| Spaeri | 1–1 | Telavi |
|---|---|---|
| Gegiadze 36' | Report | Rukhadze 61' |

Spaeri stadium, Tbilisi
Referee: Giorgi Avazashvili
10 December
18:00 GET

| Telavi | 4–0 | Spaeri |
|---|---|---|
| Ashortia 15' (pen.), 53'; Rukhadze 21'; Kantaria 28' |

Kavkasioni Arena, Telavi
Referee: Giorgi Kruashvili

6 December
13:00 GET

| Samtredia | 4–1 | Gareji |
|---|---|---|
| Mishov 7'; Pavišić 25'; I.Akhvlediani 38'; Nachkebia 43' | Report | Kharebashvili 68' |

Erosi Manjgaladze stadium, Samtredia
Referee: Aleko Aptsiauri
10 December
13:00 GET

| Gareji | 3–1 | Samtredia |
|---|---|---|
| Ugrekhelidze 14'; Papuashvili 37'; Kharebashvili 47' | | Nachkebia 8' |

Central stadium, Sagarejo
Referee: Irakli Kvirikashvili

Following these ties, both Gareji and Spaeri remained in Erovnuli Liga 2 for next season.

== Relegation playoffs ==
5 December
18:00 GET

| Locomotive | 4–0 | Rustavi |
|---|---|---|
| Makharoblidze 40', 50'; Ozbetelashvili 69', 90+3' | Report |

Mikheil Meskhi reserve stadium
Referee: Jenery Khorava
9 December
13:00 GET

| Rustavi | 4–3 | Locomotive |
|---|---|---|
| Toroshelidze 48'; Japaridze 80'; Nakano 84', 86' | Report | Molashvili 26'; Basheleishvili 43'; Ozbetelashvili 50' |

Poladi stadium
Referee: Irakli Kherkhadze

6 December
13:00 GET

| Varketili | 0–0 | Kolkheti Khobi |
|---|---|---|
| | Report |

Marakana, Tbilisi
Referee: Kote Giorgadze
10 December
13:00 GET

| Kolkheti Khobi | 1–0 | Varketili |
|---|---|---|
| Tsurtsumia 90+4' | Report |

Paata Tatarishvili stadium, Khobi
Referee: Badri Ninua

After these ties, both Locomotive and Kolkheti Khobi preserved their Liga 2 places.

== See also ==
• 2023 Erovnuli Liga

• 2023 Liga 3

• 2023 Liga 4

• 2023 Georgian Cup
