= FC Chikhura Sachkhere =

Chikhura Sachkhere
- Full name: Football Club Chikhura Sachkhere
- Founded: 1938; 88 years ago
- Dissolved: 2026
- Ground: Central Stadium; Sachkhere, Georgia
- Capacity: 2,000
- League: n/a
- 2025: Regionuli Liga, 13th
| Home colours | Away colours |

Football Club Chikhura Sachkhere, commonly known as Chikhura Sachkhere or simply Chikhura, is a defunct Georgian football club based in Sachkhere.

The team most recently competed in Regionuli Liga, the fifth tier of the Georgian league system.

== History ==
Founded in 1938, during World War II the club was disbanded, but later they resumed participation in low leagues of the republican championship.

After 2002, Chikhura was for some time financed by the Georgian businessman Bidzina Ivanishvili.

The club spent many years in lower divisions before getting promoted to Umaglesi Liga in 2012. The league gained a stable and decent member, known as a tough rival for championship title candidates. From the outset the club proved they were going to challenge the best teams. In 2013 Chikhura knocked out top flight sides Shukura, Dila and Sioni and reached David Kipiani Cup final. Despite the defeat from Dinamo Tbilisi, they qualified for the 2013–14 UEFA Europa League 1st round. This was the first season that Chikhura Sachkhere appeared in European Competition with their first opponent being Liechtenstein's Cup-winners Vaduz.

From now until 2020 the club started regularly taking part in UEFA Europa League competitions, missing out just one season in between. In almost each case this provincial team with relatively negligent financial resources, which played their matches mostly in far-away Tbilisi, could afford to show a fighting spirit against their far stronger opponents. In this regard Chikhura drew attention and respect from Georgian fans during the European campaign regardless of who they supported in the domestic league. According to the statistics, the club achieved better results in away games.

In 2014, Chikhura eliminated Turkish club Bursaspor in the second round of Europa League competition. This remains one of the most memorable successes in the club's history.

In 2016 Chikhura won White Group of the league by finishing six points clear of Dinamo Tbilisi and took part in championship play-offs, where they were beaten by Samtredia. This was the closest point to champion's title the club have ever reached in their history.

The next season Chikhura finally reaped the fruits of their efforts. After reaching the finals or semifinals of the Cup for five successive seasons, they clinched their first title. Goalkeeper Dino Hamzić, who did not concede a single goal during the entire campaign, was named man of the match.

Giorgi Gabedava became another player, who was awarded following the 2018 season. He won in four nominations, including as the best striker of the season and top scorer with the latter shared with Budu Zivzivadze. In the summer the club made headlines yet again, this time after their victory over Beitar Jerusalem and a home draw with Maribor Ljubljana.

2019 marked the beginning of the crisis. While thrashed by Aberdeen in Europa league, Chikhura failed to achieve anything noteworthy either in Erovnuli Liga or the Cup and with several key players departed, head coach Samson Pruidze left the club. The former Torpedo Kutaisi right-back had trained Chikhura for twelve seasons, an absolute record in national football history since the independence, which made him a legend among this generation of Georgian managers.

In 2020 Chikhura played all home games in Tbilisi and in the worst result in years finished in the drop-zone. Although the club avoided an automatic relegation, they suffered a defeat in both play-off games from in-form Samgurali. Following this season defender Shota Kashia, who had spent eight seasons in Chikhura, including last six years as a captain, parted ways with the club.

Chikhura's woes stretched into the next four years, when they ended up at rock bottom of second, third and fourth leagues.

== Statistics ==
=== Domestic ===
| Season | League | Pos. | Pl. | W | D | L | GF | GA | P | Cup | Europe | Notes | Manager |
|---|---|---|---|---|---|---|---|---|---|---|---|---|---|
| 1993–94 | Pirveli liga West | 13 | 26 | 3 | 2 | 21 | 16 | 70 | 11 | | | Relegated | |
| 1995–96 | Pirveli liga West | 19 | 38 | 10 | 3 | 25 | 62 | 124 | 33 | | | Relegated | |
| 2001–02 | Regionuli Liga West | | | | | | | | | | | | |
| 2002–03 | Regionuli Liga West | | | | | | | | | | | Promoted | |
| 2003–04 | Pirveli liga | 6 | 30 | 15 | 5 | 10 | 41 | 29 | 50 | Round of 32 | | | |
| 2004–05 | Pirveli liga | 8 | 30 | 12 | 7 | 11 | 38 | 35 | 43 | Round of 32 | | | |
| 2005–06 | Pirveli liga | 1 | 34 | 24 | 6 | 4 | 87 | 34 | 78 | Round of 16 | | Promoted | |
| 2006–07 | Umaglesi Liga | 12 | 26 | 5 | 6 | 15 | 13 | 46 | 21 | Quarter-finals | | Relegated | |
| 2007–08 | Pirveli liga East | 5 | 27 | 12 | 7 | 8 | 40 | 37 | 43 | Round of 32 | | | |
| 2008–09 | Pirveli liga East | 2 | 30 | 19 | 7 | 4 | 56 | 21 | 64 | Round of 16 | | | Samson Pruidze |
| 2009–10 | Pirveli liga | 6 | 28 | 14 | 7 | 7 | 41 | 28 | 49 | Quarter-finals | | | Samson Pruidze |
| 2010–11 | Pirveli liga | 4 | 32 | 20 | 6 | 6 | 58 | 25 | 66 | Round of 16 | | promotion play-off, lost | Samson Pruidze |
| 2011–12 | Pirveli liga | 1 | 14 | 8 | 2 | 4 | 25 | 15 | 26 | Round of 16 | | Promoted | Samson Pruidze |
| 2012–13 | Umaglesi Liga | 4 | 32 | 17 | 6 | 9 | 49 | 38 | 57 | Runner-up | | | Samson Pruidze |
| 2013–14 | Umaglesi Liga | 4 | 32 | 13 | 7 | 12 | 56 | 50 | 46 | Runner-up | Europa League 2nd QR | | Samson Pruidze |
| 2014–15 | Umaglesi Liga | 5 | 30 | 13 | 7 | 10 | 39 | 36 | 46 | Semi-finals | Europa League 3rd QR | | Samson Pruidze |
| 2015–16 | Umaglesi Liga | 4 | 30 | 17 | 6 | 7 | 53 | 26 | 57 | Semi-finals | | | Samson Pruidze |
| 2016 | Umaglesi Liga | 2 | 14 | 9 | 3 | 2 | 29 | 15 | 30 | Semi-finals | Europa League 1st QR | | Samson Pruidze |
| 2017 | Erovnuli Liga | 5 | 36 | 17 | 4 | 15 | 47 | 54 | 55 | Winner | Europa League 1st QR | | Samson Pruidze |
| 2018 | Erovnuli Liga | 4 | 36 | 19 | 7 | 10 | 54 | 33 | 64 | Round of 16 | Europa League 2nd QR | | Samson Pruidze |
| 2019 | Erovnuli Liga | 5 | 36 | 12 | 11 | 13 | 48 | 44 | 47 | Round of 16 | Europa League 2nd QR | | Samson Pruidze |
| 2020 | Erovnuli Liga | 9 | 18 | 3 | 4 | 11 | 18 | 40 | 13 | Semi-finals | | Play-off, relegated | Vakhtang Turmanidze |
| 2021 | Erovnuli Liga 2 | 10 | 36 | 2 | 4 | 30 | 24 | 98 | 10 | Round of 16 | | Relegated | Vakhtang Turmanidze, Mirian Mikadze |
| 2022 | Liga 3 | 16 | 30 | 0 | 1 | 29 | 19 | 119 | 1 | Second round | | | Vladimer Zabakhidze |
| 2023 | Liga 3 | 16 | 30 | 2 | 1 | 27 | 23 | 101 | 7 | First round | | Relegated | Vladimer Zabakhidze |
| 2024 | Liga 4 | 15 | 28 | 2 | 0 | 26 | 20 | 117 | 6 | First round | | Relegated | Mirian Mikadze |
| 2025 | Regionuli Liga | 13 | 30 | 7 | 4 | 19 | 41 | 107 | 25 | Preliminary round | | | Mirian Mikadze |

=== European competitions ===
| Competition | P | W | D | L | GF | GA |
|---|---|---|---|---|---|---|
| UEFA Europa League | 22 | 6 | 9 | 7 | 19 | 26 |

| Season | Competition | Round | Club | Home | Away |
|---|---|---|---|---|---|
| 2013–14 | UEFA Europa League | 1Q | (Liechtenstein) Vaduz | 0–0 | 1–1 |
| 2013–14 | UEFA Europa League | 2Q | (Switzerland) Thun | 1–3 | 0–2 |
| 2014–15 | UEFA Europa League | 1Q | (North Macedonia) Horizont Turnovo | 3–1 | 1–0 |
| 2014–15 | UEFA Europa League | 2Q | (Turkey) Bursaspor | 0–0 | 0–0 (Note: Chikhura Sachkhere won 4–1 on penalties.) |
| 2014–15 | UEFA Europa League | 3Q | (Azerbaijan) Neftchi Baku | 2–3 | 0–0 |
| 2016–17 | UEFA Europa League | 1Q | (Moldova) Zimbru Chișinău | 2–3 | 1–0 |
| 2017–18 | UEFA Europa League | 1Q | (Austria) Rheindorf Altach | 0–1 | 1–1 |
| 2018–19 | UEFA Europa League | 1Q | (Israel) Beitar Jerusalem | 0–0 | 2–1 |
| 2018–19 | UEFA Europa League | 2Q | (Slovenia) Maribor | 0–0 | 0–2 |
| 2019–20 | UEFA Europa League | 1Q | (Luxembourg) Fola Esch | 2–1 | 2–1 |
| 2019–20 | UEFA Europa League | 2Q | (Scotland) Aberdeen | 1–1 | 0–5 |

== Honours ==
- Erovnuli Liga
  - Runners-up (1): 2016
- Georgian Cup
  - Winners (1): 2017
  - Runners-up (2): 2012–13, 2013–14
- Georgian Super Cup
  - Winners (1): 2013
- Pirveli Liga
  - Winners (2): 2005-06 and 2011-12

== Stadium ==
The team's home ground is the 2,000-seat Central stadium, although in recent years they played home games at Ivantsminda stadium, situated in six km from the district center.

== Name ==
The club have had different names throughout their history, including "Spartaki", "Kolmeurne", "Peikari".

Chikhura is the name of a river in Sachkhere.
