= Irakli Rukhadze =

Georgian businessman

- Born: March 1966 (age 59); Georgia
- Citizenship: United States
- Occupations: Businessman and investor
- Known for: Management of the investment fund, Hunnewell Partners, and Supporter of the Georgian Dream party

Irakli Rukhadze is a businessman and investor primarily known for his involvement in real estate and media ventures. He was born and brought up in Georgia but is a sole United States citizen and claims to have spent most of his adult life in the West.

Rukhadze is a founding partner of Hunnewell Partners, a private equity group based in Georgia with offices in London, Luxembourg and the Netherlands. His business activities have extended beyond Georgia, involving international partnerships and projects.

Hunnewell Partners' portfolio includes some of Georgia’s largest companies including Magticom, Rustavi Metallurgical Plant, Heidelberg Cement, Liberty Bank, some of which have given Rukhadze a significant political profile in Georgia and beyond.

== Career ==
After graduating from the Tuck school at Dartmouth, Rukhadze began working at McKinsey & Company, where he spent over 4 years working in the US and Europe specializing in telecommunications, high technology and corporate finance.

He later joined Caucasus Advisors LLC, an investment firm where he served as CEO. He managed the Caucasus Fund, LLC, a $100 million fund operating in Georgia, Azerbaijan, and Armenia. Simultaneously, he held the position of director at AEGIS, the management company for Commonwealth Property Investors, LLC, a prominent US-Russian real estate investment firm. This period marked his deep involvement in real estate investment and development across different regions.

Rukhadze has been associated with various other companies and investment initiatives. He was a founding partner of Hunnewell Partners, an asset management firm with a diverse portfolio including companies like Magticom, Rustavi Metallurgical Plant, Heidelberg Cement, and Liberty Bank. By his own claim, firms that he is a major shareholder in employ more than 10,000 people across the Georgian economy.

Former ownership of Imedi TV

From 2018 until early 2026, Rukhadze and Hunnewell Partners were the owners of the independent media outlet TV Imedi, a television channel in Georgia which is broadly sympathetic to the Georgian Dream government.

Imedi is Georgia's largest, most popular and most trusted broadcaster.Ownership of the channel embedded Rukhadze more deeply within the country's political landscape and sometimes led to controversy, with some outfits describing Imedi as a "mouthpiece" for Georgian Dream.

In interviews, Rukhadze has said that he sees the role of the TV station to keep the UNM movement out of power. This stance has drawn scrutiny and criticism from opposition groups, civil society, and international observers, but Rukhadze has argued the previous UNM-led Saakashvili government destroyed freedom of speech in the country, citing Saakashvili's decision to raid and seize Imedi’s offices when last in power.

He argues Imedi is not a mouthpiece for the Georgian government, emphasising that it is "independent" and that Imedi "criticises the government when they believe it has got an issue wrong". In late 2024, Rukhadze voiced criticism of some of the Georgian Dream party's policies and argued “a more unifying figure could have been chosen [for President] who would have worked constructively with the West.”

Rukhadze has gone on the record countless times as being in favour Georgia’s eventual ascension to the European Union and closer alignment with the West, but has criticized the idea of enshrining Georgia’s European integration aspirations in the Constitution.

In February 2026, it was reported that Imedi TV would be sold by Rukhadze and his business partners to Prime Media Global and Imedi's management team. Rukhadze commented, "We firmly believe that business should be separated from politics, and therefore we have always avoided involvement in political processes....After long and tense consultations with my partners, we decided that in the current situation, the most reasonable solution is to say goodbye to our Imedi".

== Sanctions and court cases ==
Rukhadze has been sanctioned by Ukraine and Lithuania, for what those governments describe as his "active support for the ruling Georgian Dream party" and its political agenda. European MEPs have also called for sanctions against Rukhadze as part of a wider sanctions package on Georgia, but no formal measures have been adopted at the EU level.

He has also been listed as an "enabler of the Ivanishvili regime" by a United States senator, though Rukhadze maintains that as a US citizen, he would be unlikely to be sanctioned. Rukhadze claims that allegations Imedi TV is pro-Russian are “absurd and illogical”, adding he is afraid of Russia attacking Georgia following the "disastrous war with Russia in 2008."

Over the years, Rukhadze has been involved in a number of legal disputes. One of the most prominent concerned his role in tracing and recovering the hidden assets of the late Georgian billionaire Badri Patarkatsishvili, a project for which he and two associates reportedly earned more than £200 million in fees.

In 2023, the Commercial Court in London ruled that Rukhadze and several former colleagues had breached their fiduciary duties while engaged in that recovery arrangement, ordering them to pay around US $170 million in profits. The judgment was upheld by the Supreme Court of the United Kingdom in March 2025, which reaffirmed the strict “no-profit” rule for company directors and other fiduciaries.
