= 2017 Erovnuli Liga 2 =

Erovnuli Liga 2
- Season: 2017
- Dates: 4 March – 25 November 2017
- Champions: Rustavi
- Promoted: Rustavi; Sioni Bolnisi
- Relegated: Guria Lanchkhuti; Meshakhte Tkibuli; Zugdidi
- Matches: 180
- Goals: 499 (2.77 per match)
- Top goalscorer: Data Sitchinava (30 goals)

The 2017 Erovnuli Liga 2 (formerly known as Pirveli Liga) was the 29th season of second tier football in Georgia. The season began on 4 March 2017 and ended on 25 November 2017.

== Teams and stadiums ==
Locations of the 2017 Erovnuli Liga 2 teams.

Team	Location	Venue	Capacity
Gagra	Tbilisi	Mtskheta Park	2,000
Guria Lanchkhuti	Lanchkhuti	Evgrapi Shevardnadze Stadium	8,000
Meshakhte Tkibuli	Rustavi	Vladimer Bochorishvili Stadium	6,000
Merani Martvili	Martvili	Murtaz Khurtsilava Stadium	2,000
FC Rustavi	Rustavi	Poladi Stadium	6,200
Samgurali Tskaltubo	Tskaltubo	Murtaz Khurtsilava Stadium	2,000
Sioni Bolnisi	Bolnisi	Tamaz Stepania Stadium	3,242
Tskhinvali	Tskhinvali	Poladi Stadium	6,200
WIT Georgia	Mtskheta	Mtskheta Park	2,000
Zugdidi	Zugdidi	Tsentraluri Stadioni	2,000

== League table ==
Pos	Team	Pld	W	D	L	GF	GA	GD	Pts	Promotion, qualification or relegation
1	Rustavi (C, P)	36	26	5	5	72	25	+47	83	Promotion to Erovnuli Liga
2	Merani Martvili	36	24	8	4	67	16	+51	80	Qualification for Promotion play-offs
3	Sioni Bolnisi (P)	36	18	5	13	52	48	+4	59	Qualification for Promotion play-offs
4	Samgurali Tskaltubo	36	16	5	15	46	46	0	53	
5	Gagra	36	16	5	15	46	38	+8	53	
6	WIT Georgia	36	14	10	12	42	40	+2	52	
7	Tskhinvali	36	11	7	18	62	75	−13	40	
8	Guria Lanchkhuti (R)	36	11	4	21	47	68	−21	37	Qualification for Relegation play-offs
9	Meshakhte Tkibuli (R)	36	7	6	23	33	75	−42	27	Qualification for Relegation play-offs
10	Zugdidi (R)	36	6	7	23	32	68	−36	25	Relegation to Liga 3

Source: Erovnuli Liga 2, Soccerway
Rules for classification: 1) Points; 2) Head-to-head points; 3) Head-to-head goal difference; 4) Head-to-head goals scored; 5) Head-to-head away goals scored (only if two teams); 6) Goal difference; 7) Goals scored.
(C) Champions; (P) Promoted; (R) Relegated

== Relegation play-offs ==
30 November 2017
13:00 UTC+4

Telavi	2–1	Guria Lanchkhuti
Kharebashvili 56'; Nozadze 90+2' (pen.)	Report	Tela 61'

Givi Chokheli Stadium, Telavi
Attendance: 1,000
Referee: Giorgi Vardidze
3 December 2017
13:00 UTC+4

Guria Lanchkhuti	1–1	Telavi
Shengelia 82'	Report	Nikabadze 45'

Evgrapi Shevardnadze Stadium, Lanchkhuti
Referee: Irakli Kakabadze

Telavi won 3–2 on aggregate.

30 November 2017
14:30 UTC+4

Meshakhte Tkibuli	0–2	Norchi Dinamo
	Report	Deisadze 40'; Melkadze 63'

Ramaz Shengelia Stadium, Kutaisi
Attendance: 200
Referee: Bakur Ninua
3 December 2017
13:00 UTC+4

Norchi Dinamo	4–0	Meshakhte Tkibuli
Pipia 2'; Deisadze 59'; Gogoberishvili 68'; Shengelidze 81'	Report

Sport-kompleksi Shatili, Tbilisi
Attendance: 300
Referee: Davit Kharitonashvili

Norchi Dinamoeli won 6–0 on aggregate.
