= FC Merani Martvili =

Merani Martvili
- Full name: Football Club Merani Martvili
- Founded: 2006
- Ground: Murtaz Khurtsilava stadium Martvili
- Capacity: 1,850
- Manager: Givi Khelaia
- League: Erovnuli Liga 2
- 2025: 4th of 10
- Website: fcmerani.ge
Home colours	Away colours

FC Merani Martvili is a Georgian association football club based in Martvili. They compete in Erovnuli Liga 2, the 2nd division of Georgian football.

Being one of the youngest clubs, Merani have spent five seasons in the top division and once reached the final of the David Kipiani Cup.

== History ==
Football clubs from Martvili have previously been called Salkhino Gegechkori (Soviet times), Chkondidi Martvili and Salkhino Martvili.

FC Merani was founded by Georgian ex-minister of communications Fridon Injia in 2006.

In their first season in Pirveli liga under head coach Malkhaz Zhvania, Merani came 3rd and until the promotion to Umaglesi Liga in 2011/12 they stayed among the top five clubs.

In 2010, Merani became a first II league club to play in David Kipiani Cup semifinals where they lost 1–2 on aggregate to WIT Georgia, the Cup winners of the season. The next year Merani successfully completed their season and as a second-placed team gained promotion to the top flight.

During the next five seasons in Umaglesi Liga Merani achieved the best result in their first year when they came 5th during the regular season and earned a place in the championship round. In other cases, the club was mostly involved in relegation battles.

In 2015/16, Merani were relegated. In the same year, they managed to reach the Cup final after having eliminated Dila, Kolkheti 1913 and Chikhura in previous rounds, but in the title-deciding game held in Zestaponi the team was beaten by Torpedo Kutaisi.

Merani came close back to Erovnuli Liga in 2017, although they were unable to beat Kolkheti 1913 in promotion play-offs.

At the end of the next season Merani lost the last two league games and surprisingly finished at the bottom of the table, which implied an automatic relegation. After one year spent in Liga 3 though they returned to the second division.

In early 2021, Pridon Injia quit the club and Jesi Surmava, the head of Martvili Football School, took over the management, which resulted in major changes among both staff and squad members. 27 year-old head coach Tsotne Moniava in his first year in charge of a professional club was named the Manager of Round IV (October–December) after guiding Merani to the bronze medals and promotion playoffs. Besides, Merani's two players were included in the symbolic team. Despite a two-goal advantage achieved at home after the first game against Torpedo Kutaisi, the club suffered a heart-breaking extra-time defeat during a dramatic and action-packed return leg.

Two years later, Merani suffered an automatic relegation, although after a single season in Liga 3 snatched a last-gasp aggregate play-off victory over Shturmi to seal promotion back to the 2nd division.

== Seasons ==
Season	Div.	Pos.	Pl.	W	D	L	GF	GA	P	Cup	Notes
2007/08	2nd	3	27	13	5	9	36	25	44		
2008/09	2nd	3	30	18	6	6	45	24	60	Quarter-finals	
2009/10	2nd	3	28	17	2	9	44	31	53	Semi-finals	
2010/11	2nd	2	32	22	7	3	60	15	73	Round of 16	Promoted
2011/12	1st	8	28	6	3	19	31	55	21	Quarter-finals	
2012/13	1st	8	22	7	2	13	23	36	23	Round of 32	Relegation group
2013/14	1st	12	22	4	3	15	16	41	15	Round of 8	Relegation group
2014/15	1st	11	30	9	9	12	29	33	36	Round of 16	
2015/16	1st	15	30	5	8	17	28	62	23	Round of 32	Relegated
2016	2nd	4	16	9	5	2	31	11	26	Runner-up	Relegation play-off, won
2017	2nd	2	36	24	8	4	67	16	80	Round of 8	Promotion play-off, lost (Note: Lost 4–3 on aggregate to Kolkheti 1913 in Liga 1/2 playoffs)
2018	2nd	10	36	8	12	16	36	47	36	Round of 16	Relegated
2019	3rd	1	36	26	4	6	78	24	82	Round of 8	Promoted
2020	2nd	8	18	6	6	6	23	20	30	Round of 32	Relegation play-off, won (Note: Defeated Gori 3–1 on aggregate in Liga 2/3 playoffs)
2021	2nd	3	36	19	7	10	65	44	64	Round of 16	Promotion play-off, lost (Note: Lost to Torpedo 3–2 on aggregate in Liga 1/2 playoffs)
2022	2nd	4	28	12	6	10	55	53	42	Round of 16	
2023	2nd	9	36	6	8	22	34	84	26	Round of 32	Relegated
2024	3rd	3	30	17	7	6	60	30	58	2nd round	Promotion play-off, won (Note: Beat Shturmi 2–1 on aggregate in Liga 2/3 playoffs)
2025	2nd	4	13	11	12	22	41	55	50	Round of 16	

== Current squad ==
As of 19 March 2026

Note: Flags indicate national team as defined under FIFA eligibility rules; some limited exceptions apply. Players may hold more than one non-FIFA nationality.

No.	Pos.	Nation	Player
1	GK	RUS	Khazbulat Khamkhoev
4	DF	GEO	Nikoloz Kharabadze
5	DF	GEO	Nika Chumburidze
6	MF	GEO	Temur Kepuladze
7	FW	UZB	Javokhir Esankulov
8	MF	GEO	Luka Kadaria
9	FW	GEO	Andro Jolokhava
10	MF	GEO	Zviad Sikharulia
11	MF	GEO	Giorgi Ugrekhelidze
12	MF	GEO	Gela Bendeliani
13	DF	GEO	Giorgi Surmava
14	MF	GEO	Davit Khelaia

No.	Pos.	Nation	Player
17	MF	GEO	Luka Begalishvili
18	MF	GEO	Luka Tsulaia
19	MF	GEO	Lasha Gadilia
20	MF	RUS	Renat Gagity
22	MF	RUS	Ruslan Askerov
23	DF	GEO	Giorgi Gvasalia
25	DF	CIV	Doueugui Mala
27	MF	GEO	Beka Darsalia
29	DF	RUS	Igor Khaimanov
30	MF	GEO	Nodar Kavtaradze
31	GK	GEO	Valer Chachava
33	MF	GEO	Bakar Laghadze (Captain)
40	FW	RUS	Aslam Mutaliev

== Other teams ==
Merani also have a reserve team, which as Merani-2 competes in Liga 4.

== Stadium ==
Merani plays home matches at Murtaz Khurtsilava stadium, which has the capacity of 1,850 seats.

In February 2017 this arena hosted the Georgian Super Cup game.

== Honours ==
- Pirveli Liga
  - Silver Medal winner: 2010–11, 2017
  - Bronze Medal winner: 2007–08, 2008–09, 2009–10, 2021
- David Kipiani Cup
  - Runners-up: 2016

== Name ==
Merani is a Georgian word for pegasus.
