= FC Sioni Bolnisi =

Sioni Bolnisi
- Full name: Football Club Sioni Bolnisi
- Founded: 1936; 90 years ago
- Ground: Tamaz Stepania Stadium, Bolnisi
- Capacity: 3,000
- Chairman: Levan Silagadze
- Manager: Armaz Jeladze
- League: Erovnuli Liga 2
- 2025: Erovnuli Liga 2, 5th of 10
- Website: fcsioni.ge
Home colours	Away colours

FC Sioni (Georgian: საფეხბურთო კლუბი სიონი) is a Georgian professional football club based in Bolnisi. They compete in Erovnuli Liga Liga 2, the second tier of the Georgian league system.

The team has won the league title on one occasion, in 2005/06. Sioni play their home matches at local stadium named after Tamaz Stepania.

== History ==
The football club in Bolnisi was founded in 1936. For years they took part in Georgian domestic competitions under the name Madneuli. While being in the second division in early 1990s, the team emerged among the candidates challenging for the top league.

For the first time Sioni participated in Umaglesi Liga in the 1995/96 season and after initial several years made significant progress towards joining ambitious clubs vying for titles.

In 2002, they reached the Cup final, although failed to prevail over Dinamo Tbilisi.

In the 2003/04 season, Sioni and WIT Georgia shared the first position in the league, and the title was decided in a championship play-off. WIT won the game 2–0, but a crowd violence during the match led UEFA to ban Sioni from the UEFA Cup participation.

The third attempt two years later turned out successful. The club set a remarkable unbeaten home record by winning 14 games out of 15 and ended the season five points clear of a main rival. Kakha Tskhadadze became Manager of the Year, while striker Koka Mikuchadze, who scored 19 goals, was named in the symbolic team of the season. Sioni represented Georgia in the UEFA Champions League 2006-07, where they defeated FK Baku from Azerbaijan in the first qualifying round, but were eliminated by Bulgarian champions Levski Sofia in the second stage, losing 2–0 both home and away.

Old Logo

As champions, in January 2007 Sioni participated in the CIS Cup in Moscow where they defeated two opponents out of three, although failed to qualify for the play-offs on goal difference.

Sioni achieved another league success in 2013/14. Under Vladimir Burduli the club, strengthened by some experienced players, including former national team members Valeri Abramidze and Revaz Kemoklidze, won the bronze medals. Two years later Sioni played in the national Cup final for the second time in fifteen years. Soon their performance deteriorated, which saw the team relegated to Liga 2 for the first time in the last two decades.

Following a two-year tenure in the second division, Sioni secured another promotion in 2021. The team topped the league from the very beginning and, although slipped up in midseason which resulted in the sacking of the manager, eventually they comfortably won the championship contest.

Sioni spent the entire 2022 season in battles to move out of the drop zone. Due to poor results, the club twice replaced managers during the year. At the end of the season, they lost both play-off ties to Samtredia and suffered a third relegation in seven seasons.

== Seasons ==
=== Domestic leagues ===
Season	League	Pos	Top scorers	Goals	Cup
1990	2nd	14_{/20}			Round of 16
1991	2nd	18_{/18}↓			Quarterfinals
1991/92	3rd	↑			―
1992/93	2nd	5_{/16}			Round of 16
1993/94	2nd, East	12_{/18}			―
1994/95	2nd, East	1_{/16}↑			1st round
1995/96	1st	9_{/16}			Round of 16
1996/97	1st	9_{/16}			Quarterfinals
1997/98	1st	13_{/16}			Round of 16
1998/99	1st	13_{/16}			Round of 16
1999/2000	1st	6_{/16}			2nd round
2000/01	1st	8_{/12}			Round of 16
2001/02	1st	8_{/12}	Shalva Isiani	12	Round of 16
2002/03	1st	5_{/12}	Levan Shavgulidze	11	Runners-up
2003/04	1st	2_{/12}	Boris Goncharov	17	Round of 16
2004/05	1st	7_{/10}	Davit Gogoladze	8	Round of 16
2005/06	1st	1_{/16}	Akaki Mikuchadze	19	Semifinals
2006/07	1st	6_{/14}			Semifinals
2007/08	1st	8_{/14}			1st round
2008/09	1st	5_{/11}			Quarterfinals
2009/10	1st	6_{/10}	Aleksandre Gogoberishvili	6	Round of 16
2010/11	1st	8_{/10}	Revaz Gotsiridze	7	Quarterfinals
2011/12	1st	12_{/12}	Giorgi Kutsurua	4	Round of 16
2012/13	1st	10_{/12}	Giorgi Kakhelishvili, Valeri; Abramidze, Lado Akhalaia	4	Semifinals
2013/14	1st	3_{/12}	Rezo Jikia	6	Quarterfinals
2014/15	1st	13_{/16}	Data Sitchinava	11	2nd round
2015/16	1st	5_{/16}	Dimitri Tatanashvili	11	Runners-up
2016	1st	6_{/14}↓ (Note: Lost to Pirveli Liga side Shukura 4–5 on aggregate in relegation play-offs)	Davit Volkovi	6	2nd round
2017	2nd	3_{/10}↑ (Note: Beat Dinamo Batumi on penalties in promotion play-offs)	Jaba Dvali	21	Round of 16
2018	1st	8_{/10} (Note: Beat Gagra 4–0 on aggregate in relegation play-offs)	Davit Kirkitadze	6	3rd round
2019	1st	9_{/10}↓ (Note: Beaten by Samtredia 4–1 on aggregate in relegation play-offs)	Jaba Ugulava	9	Round of 16
2020	2nd	7_{/10}	Zviad Sikharulia	4	2nd Round
2021	2nd	1_{/10}↑	Data Sitchinava	20	Round of 16
2022	1st	8_{/10}↓ (Note: Lost to Samtredia 3–0 on aggregate in relegation play-offs)	Nika Khorkheli	9	Round of 32
2023	2nd	4_{/10}	Vano Khabelashvili; Gocha Tsirdava	9	Round of 16
2024	2nd	3_{/10} (Note: Lost promotion playoffs to Gagra on penalties)	Data Sitchinava	21	3rd round
2025	2nd	5_{/10}	Data Sitchinava	20	Round of 16

=== Overall ===
Seasons spent in Georgian leagues since 1990:

● Umaglesi Liga / Erovnuli Liga (1st tier): 25

● Pirveli Liga / Erovnuli Liga 2 (2nd tier): 12

● Meore Liga (3rd tier): 1

Correct up to 2026 season

=== European football ===
Season	Competition	Round	Club	Home	Away
2003–04	UEFA Cup	QR	(Slovakia) FK Púchov	0–3	0–3
2006–07	UEFA Champions League	1Q	(Azerbaijan) FC Baku	2–0	0–1
2006–07	UEFA Champions League	2Q	(Bulgaria) PFC Levski Sofia	0–2	0–2
2014–15	UEFA Europa League	1Q	(Albania) Flamurtari	2–3	2–1

== Current squad ==
As of 17 March 2026

Note: Flags indicate national team as defined under FIFA eligibility rules; some limited exceptions apply. Players may hold more than one non-FIFA nationality.

No.	Pos.	Nation	Player
1	GK	GEO	Beka Kurdadze
2	DF	GEO	Giorgi Gaprindashvili
3	DF	GEO	Tornike Dundua
4	DF	GEO	Tornike Mindiashvili-Imerlishvili
6	MF	BIH	Adam Huskic
7	MF	GEO	Luka Gegeshidze
8	MF	GHA	Blessing Kwame Assamoa
9	FW	GEO	Sergo Kukhianidze
10	MF	GEO	Kuji Beselia
11	FW	RSA	Bantu Mzwakali
12	MF	GEO	Dachi Tsnobiladze

No.	Pos.	Nation	Player
13	MF	GEO	Giorgi Kakulia
16	MF	GEO	Giorgi Ubilava
18	FW	GEO	Tornike Guliashvili
19	MF	GEO	Rezo Gazdeliani
20	DF	GEO	Aleksandre Cholokava
21	DF	GEO	Giorgi Jeladze
22	DF	GEO	Shota Pantsulaia
24	DF	GEO	Rati Mchedlishvili
25	DF	GEO	Varlam Kilasonia
32	GK	GEO	Luka Avaliani

== Managers ==
- (Georgia (country)) Kakha Tskhadadze (Dec 31, 2005 – Aug 31, 2006)
- (Georgia (country)) Giorgi Kipshidze (Jul 1, 2007 – Jun 30, 2008)
- (Georgia (country)) Otar Korgalidze (Jul 1, 2008 – Jun 30, 2009)
- (Georgia (country)) Temur Makharadze (Jul 1, 2008 – Jun 30, 2010)
- (Georgia (country)) Giorgi Kipshidze (Jul 1, 2010 – Mar 19, 2011)
- (Georgia (country)) Khvicha Kasrashvili (Mar 18, 2011–1?)
- (Georgia (country)) Vakhtang Chagelishvili (Jul 1, 2011–1?)
- (Georgia (country)) Levan Bajelidze (Sept 15, 2011 – Jan 12, 2012)
- (Georgia (country)) Khvicha Kasrashvili (Jan 15 – Aug 27, 2012)
- (Georgia (country)) Armaz Jeladze (Aug 28, 2012 – Jun 1, 2013)
- (Georgia (country)) Giorgi Kiknadze (Jun 1, 2013–Oct, 2013)
- (Georgia (country)) Vladimir Burduli (Oct, 2013–)
- (Georgia (country)) Koba Zhorzhikashvili (2017–2018)
- (Georgia (country)) Teimuraz Shalamberidze (2018–2019)
- (Georgia (country)) Davit Kokiashvili (February - July 2020)
- (Georgia (country)) Varlam Kilasonia (July 2020 - June 2021)
- (Georgia (country)) (Israel) Giorgi Daraselia (June 2021 - March 2022)
- (Georgia (country)) Ucha Sosiashvili (March - November 2022)
- (Georgia (country)) Giorgi Chelidze (November - December 2022)
- (Georgia (country)) Koba Zhorzhikashvili (February - June 2023)
- (Georgia (country)) Giorgi Okropiridze (June 2023 - March 2024)
- (Georgia (country)) Giorgi Devdariani (March – June 2024)
- (Georgia (country)) Gaga Kirkitadze (June – September 2024)
- (Georgia (country)) Giorgi Chelidze (October 2024 – May 2025)
- (Georgia (country)) Varlam Kilasonia (May - December 2025)
- (Georgia (country)) Ucha Sosiashvili (January - August 2026)
- (Georgia (country)) Armaz Jeladze (since August 2026)

== Honours ==
- Umaglesi Liga/Erovnuli Liga
  - Winners (1): 2005–06
  - Runners-up (1): 2003-04
  - Third place (1): 2013-14
- Pirveli Liga/Erovnuli Liga 2
  - Winners (2): 1994–95 (East), 2021
  - Third place (2): 2017, 2024
- Georgian Cup
  - Runners-up (2): 2002-03, 2015-16

== Sponsors ==
Rich Metals Group, engaged in mining activities near Bolnisi, signed a first sponsorship contract with Sioni in 2016.

== Name ==
While Sioni is a Georgian equivalent of Zion, the football club is named after Bolnisi Sioni, the fifth century cathedral located near the current municipal centre.
