= Tamaz Stepania Stadium =

Multi-use stadium in Bolnisi, Georgia

Coordinates: 41°26′52.79″N 44°32′06.67″E

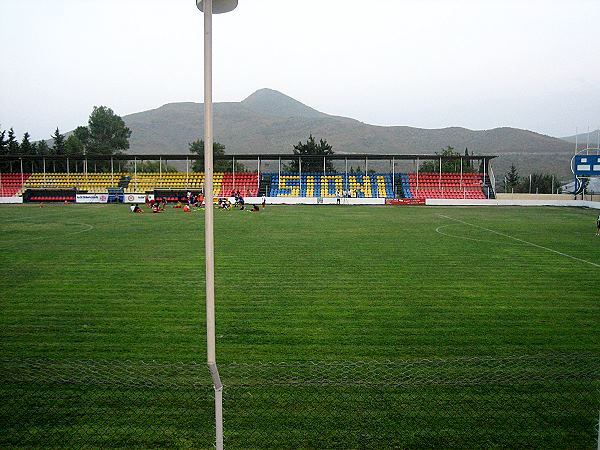
Tamaz Stepania Stadium

Tamaz Stephania Stadium is a multi-use stadium in Bolnisi, Georgia. It is used mostly for football matches and is the home stadium of FC Sioni Bolnisi. The stadium is able to hold 3,000 people.

The stadium is named after Tamaz Stepania, - former player, who was a goalkeeper for Dinamo Tbilisi. He died in a road accident at the age of 21.
