= Georgian football league system =

In the Georgian football league system, known as the Georgian League Pyramid, are different leagues in country with Erovnuli Liga, then Liga 3 and Liga 4, then regional and Amateur League. teams from Regionuli Liga don't relegate to lower divisions, as it is the last professional level of Georgian Football Federation. after Regionuli Liga, it is the Georgian Amateur Football League, where there are leagues through 62 municipalities. in total there are 507 teams through all leagues.

== History ==
in 1906, was created the first ever Georgian football club: FC Shevardeni-1906 Tbilisi which is no longer a football club due to financial issues. after Georgia got Independence, the first ever Georgian football league was in 1990 Umaglesi Liga, which later got renamed to Erovnuli Liga in 2017.

== The System ==
Level one is Erovnuli Liga, the top division of Georgian football, followed by Erovnuli Liga 2, Liga 3 and Liga 4. after Liga 4, teams relegate to Regionuli Liga Group A, Group B, or Group C, which is about the team's region, Group A is Eastern Georgia, Southern Georgia and Tbilisi, Group B is also Eastern Georgia, Southern Georgia and Tbilisi, Group C is West Georgia, after Regionuli Liga, if a team finishes last, the team will stay in the division for next season, but if the team suffers financial issues, the team can shut down. top 1 in each Regionuli Liga group advance directly to Liga 4, while all group's 2nd place teams play a mini play-off tournament where 1 more spot to advance. from Liga 4 to Regionuli Liga, last 4 teams relegate. In relegation/promotion, in Erovnuli Liga against Erovnuli Liga 2, top 1 or last place relegate/promote. while the 2nd and 3rd in Erovnuli Liga 2, or Erovnuli Liga last-second or last-third play against each-other in a 2-Legged match. if the Erovnuli Liga team wins, both teams remain in their leagues. if Erovnuli Liga 2 team wins, they promote and the Erovnuli Liga team gets relegated. in Erovnuli Liga 2 against Liga 3, Liga 3 top 2 teams advance instantly, while Erovnuli Liga 2 last 2 teams relegate directly, and 3rd and 4th places in Liga 3 get promotion play-offs against Erovnuli Liga 2 Last 3rd and Last 4th in a 2-Legged game. if the Liga 3 team wins, the Erovnuli Liga 2 relegates while the Liga 3 team promotes. in Liga 3 against Liga 4, last 3 Liga 3 teams relegate and top 3 Liga 4 teams advance.

Level	Clubs	League, division
1	10	Erovnuli Liga (1 Relegates, 2 relegation play-offs)
2	10	Erovnuli Liga 2 (1 Promotions, 2 promotion play-offs, 2 relegates, 2 relegation play-offs)
3	16	Liga 3 (2 Promotions, 2 promotion play-offs, 3 relegates)
4	16	Liga 4 (3 Promotions, 4 relegates)
5	43	Regionuli Liga (Group A, 1 promotes, 1 play-off, Group B, 1 promotes, 1 play-off, Group C, 1 promotes, 1 play-off)
6	412	Georgian Amateur Football League, Amateur League Akhmeta, Amateur League Gurjaani, Amateur League Dedoplistskaro, Amateur League Telavi, Amateur League Lagodekhi, Amateur League Sagarejo, Amateur League Sighnaghi, Amateur League Kvareli, Amateur League Kutaisi, Amateur League Baghdati, Amateur League Vani, Amateur League Zestaponi, Amateur League Terjola, Amateur League Samtredia, Amateur League Sachkhere, Amateur League Tkibuli, Amateur League Tskhaltubo, Amateur League Chiatura, Amateur League Kharagauli, Amateur League Khoni, Amateur League Zugdidi, Amateur League Abasha, Amateur League Martvili, Amateur League Mestia, Amateur League Senaki, Amateur League Poti, Amateur League Chkhorotsku, Amateur League Tsalenjikha, Amateur League Rustavi, Amateur League Bolnisi, Amateur League Gardabani, Amateur League Dmanisi, Amateur League Tetristkaro, Amateur League Marneuli, Amateur League Tsalka, Amateur League Gori, Amateur League Kaspi, Amateur League Kareli, Amateur League Khashuri, Amateur League Java, Amateur League Ozurgeti, Amateur League Lanchkhuti, Amateur League Chokhatauri, Amateur League Akhaltsikhe, Amateur League Adigeni, Amateur League Aspindza, Amateur League Akhalkalaki, Amateur League Borjomi, Amateur League Ninotsminda, Amateur League Mtskheta, Amateur League Akhalgori, Amateur League Dusheti, Amateur League Tianeti, Amateur League Kazbegi, Amateur League Ambrolauri, Amateur League Lentekhi, Amateur League Oni, Amateur League Tsageri, Amateur League Batumi, Amateur League Kobuleti, Amateur League Tbilisi, Amateur League Tbilisi Liga 2 Group A,B.

there are 6 levels in Georgian Football, Erovnuli Liga, Erovnuli Liga 2, Liga 3, Liga 4, Regionuli Liga then Georgian Amateur leagues through 62 municipalities.

== Clubs ==
League	Clubs
Erovnuli Liga	FC Rustavi, Dinamo Tbilisi, FC Iberia 1999, Dinamo Batumi, Dila Gori, Torpedo Kutaisi, Samgurali Tskhaltubo, FC Gagra, FC Spaeri, FC Meshakhte Tkibuli.
Erovnuli Liga 2	FC Gareji, FC Telavi, SFC Sturmi, Merani Martvili, FC Sioni, Aragvi Dusheti, Odishi 1919, Kolkheti Poti, FC Gori, FC Samtredia.
Liga 3	Tbilisi 2025, Guria, FC Iberia 1999 B, WIT Georgia, Gonio, Merani Tbilisi, Orbi, Didube, Dinamo Tbilisi II, Locomotive, Margveti 2006, Kolkheti Khobi, Gardabani, Iveria, Betlemi, FC Iberia 2010.
Liga 4	FC West Georgia, Aragvelebi, FC Samtskhe, Torpedo Kutaisi 2, Borjomi, FC Mertskhali, Samgurali Tskhaltubo 2, Aragvi Dusheti 2, WIT Georgia 2, Skuri, Algeti, Locomotive-2, FC Gagra 2, FC Kolkheti 1913-2, Merani Martvili 2, FC Bakhmaro.
Regionuli Liga	Tbilisi 2025-2, FC Metalurgi Rustavi 2, Dinamo Sokhumi, FC Telavi-2, Zooveti, Iuji 35, Dmanisi, FC Gareji-2, Gardabani 2, Iunkeri, 35th S.S, Merani Tbilisi 2, Ushba, Avaza, Dinamo Gagra, FC Spaeri 2, Orbi 2, Kaspi 1936, FC Meshakhte Tkibuli 2, FC Abuli, Iveria-2, Tskhumi, Liakhvi Achabeti, Gori 2, Zestaponi, FC Iberia 2010 B, Norchi Dinamo 2016, Aragvi 1954, Uqimerioni, Kareli, Magharoeli, Egrisi, Sapovnela, Sulori, Dinamo Batumi 2, Jvari, Imereti, Machakhela, Sairme, Kolkheti Khobi 2, Odishi 1919 2, Shukura 1960, Zana.
Amateur (Known Clubs)	FC Shturmi, Jitisi, VS Brothers, Komagebi, Apkhazeti, AFC All-star, Basa, Seu, Stela, Kolkheti, Kvartali, Lazebi, Olimpi, Aradani, ULC Terminal, Paskunji, Didgori, Kick-Start, Masivi, Strada, Gold Eagle, Chilovani, Peola, Tbilisi 2019, Basiani 2025, Jvarosnebi, Panenka, IBSU, Akto Union, Toro, JTS United, Daisi, Deka, Sagarejo, Lagodekhi, Vazisubani, Tibaani, Gavazi, Dedoplistskaro, Duru, Agara, Kvisheti, Giganti, Gori, Guria 2026, Tskaltubo, Megri, Chale, FC Pirates, Lia 2025, Bashi, Onoghia, Kheta, Sadzmo, Nagvazao, Lesichine, Tsalenjikha, DRD, XDK, Bukia, Terjola
