= FC Iberia 1999 B =

Football Club Iberia 1999 B
- Founded: 1999; 27 years ago
- Ground: Bendela stadium, Tbilisi, Georgia
- Capacity: 1,800
- Chairman: Tariel Khechikashvili
- Coach: Davit Khitiri
- League: Liga 3
- 2025: 8th of 10 (relegated)
- Website: fciberia1999.ge
Home colours	Away colours

FC Iberia 1999 B, also known as Iberia-2 1999, is a Georgian football team based in Tbilisi.

Founded in 1999, it is the reserve team of Iberia 1999 and plays in the 3rd division of Georgian football following their relegation in 2025. An 1,800-seat stadium Bendela located in Saburtalo district of Tbilisi is their home ground.

Prior to March 2024, the team was known as Saburtalo-2.

== Background ==
Unlike in some other nations where reserve teams have their own separate league, Georgian teams are allowed to play in the same football pyramid as their parent clubs both in the league and cup competitions. However, they cannot face each other in the same division and, therefore, are ineligible for promotion to the division in which the main side plays. Likewise, should the senior team suffer relegation to a division where the reserves play, the latter will automatically drop into a lower tier.

== History ==
Saburtalo-2 made a debut in Georgian football in 2017. With their senior side already promoted to the Erovnuli Liga, the reserve team entered the Regionuli Liga tournament and under the management of Revaz Gotsiridze won the B Group, implying automatic promotion to Liga 3.

The team started their 2018 season with five wins in as many matches, which made Saburtalo-2 one of the key title contenders. But they slipped up in the final phase and finished just below the playoff spots, picking up four points in the last five games.

The 2020 season was most difficult for Saburtalo-2. In terms of sport achievements, they finished 8th among the ten clubs but what badly affected the team and shocked the whole country was a brutal murder of their promising 19-year-old defender Giorgi Shakarashvili. To honour his name, Saburtalo named one of its academy stadiums after Shakarashvili and retired his No 21 jersey from its all teams.

Saburtalo-2 spent the next three seasons in mid-table before beating their two rivals in the race for a promotion playoff place in 2024. Strengthened by first team members Gizo Mamageishvili and Iuri Tabatadze, the club cruised to a narrow aggregate victory over Aragvi and sealed their first promotion in seven years.

In the same year, chairman Tariel Khechikashvili announced that he decided to rebrand the club by changing its name to Iberia 1999.

The team failed to retain its Liga 2 spot a year later after a dramatic two-legged playoff tie against Odishi 1919.

== Seasons ==
Year	League	Pos	M	W	D	L	GF–GA	Pts	Domestic Cup
2018	Liga 3	4th of 20	38	21	4	13	60–50	67	2nd round
2019	Liga 3	5th of 20	36	15	3	18	53–67	48	2nd round
2020	Liga 3	8th of 10	18	6	1	11	22–31	19	1st round
2021	Liga 3	7th of 14	26	10	8	8	53–36	38	3rd round
2022	Liga 3	7th of 16	30	13	4	13	46–44	43	3rd round
2023	Liga 3	7th of 16	30	12	9	9	45–26	45	2nd round
2024	Liga 3	4th of 16↑ (Note: Beat Aragvi 3–2 on aggregate)	30	15	10	5	52–26	55	2nd round
2025	Liga 2	8th of 10↓ (Note: Lost to Odishi 1919 4–3 on aggregate)	30	10	12	14	40–44	42	Round of 16

== Squad ==
As of 21 May 2025

Note: Flags indicate national team as defined under FIFA eligibility rules; some limited exceptions apply. Players may hold more than one non-FIFA nationality.

No.	Pos.	Nation	Player
1	GK	GEO	Saba Samkharadze
2	MF	GEO	Giorgi Gogsadze
3	DF	GEO	Nikoloz Bochorishvili
4	DF	GEO	Tengo Mamporia
5	MF	GEO	Nika Tchumburidze
6	DF	GEO	Giorgi Ambrosidze
7	FW	GEO	Davit Gogilashvili
8	MF	GEO	Giorgi Chachua
9	FW	GEO	Amiran Dzagania
10	FW	GEO	Davit Mikaia
11	MF	GEO	Tsotne Khechikashvili
12	GK	GEO	Saba Bochorishvili
13	MF	GEO	Giorgi Kakulia
14	FW	GEO	Guram Goshteliani (C)
15	DF	GEO	Giorgi Kukalia
16	GK	GEO	Revaz Kurtanidze

No.	Pos.	Nation	Player
17	MF	GEO	Saba Geguchadze
18	MF	GEO	Giorgi Sajaia
19	FW	GEO	Daniel Qvartskhava
20	MF	GEO	Shotiko Tsamalashvili
22	MF	GEO	Givi Khachidze
23	DF	GEO	Giorgi Tabatadze
24	MF	GEO	Giorgi Magradze
25	DF	GEO	Aleksandre Amisulashvili
26	DF	GEO	Zurab Lataria
27	DF	GEO	Giorgi Chanturia
29	DF	GEO	Nikoloz Kalandadze
30	MF	GEO	Zaza Tsamalashvili
31	MF	GEO	Nika Khorkheli
33	MF	GEO	Mate Antia
39	MF	GEO	Akaki Menagarishvili
40	MF	GEO	Chabuki Labadze

== Managers ==
Name	Nat.	From	To
Revaz Gotsiridze	(Georgia (country))	2017	2019
Giorgi Chelidze	(Georgia (country))	2019	2021
Temur Shalamberidze	(Georgia (country))	2021	2022
Bakhva Ambidze	(Georgia (country))	2022	2023
Ucha Sosiashvili	(Georgia (country))	2023	2023
Temur Shalamberidze (2)	(Georgia (country))	2023	2024
Gia Akhalkatsi	(Georgia (country))	2024	2024
Davit Kokiashvili	(Georgia (country))	2025	2025
Guga Nergadze	(Georgia (country))	2025	2025
Davit Khitiri	(Georgia (country))	2025	

== Notable players ==
These former Saburtalo-2 footballers have played for the senior national team, U21s or both:

- Giorgi Guliashvili
- Sandro Altunashvili
- Giorgi Gocholeishvili
- Saba Mamatsashvili
- Shota Nonikashvili
- Gizo Mamageishvili
- Otar Mamageishvili
- Giorgi Kvernadze

== Honours ==
Regionuli Liga

- Winners: 2017, Group B

== See also ==
- Iberia 1999 - First team
