= 2022 Liga 4 (Georgia) =

Football season in Georgia

Liga 4
- Season: 2022
- Dates: 5 April – 20 November
- Champions: Locomotive II
- Promoted: Locomotive II; Shturmi; Matchakhela
- Relegated: Didube; Samegrelo; Magaroeli; Iberia
- Matches played: 240
- Goals scored: 794 (3.31 per match)
- Biggest home win: Shturmi 8–1 Merani II (13 September); WIT Georgia II 8–1 Margveti (25 October)
- Biggest away win: Iberia 1–9 Skuri (21 June)
- Highest scoring: Magaroeli 4–6 Iberia (11 May); Margveti 2–8 Locomotive II (19 May); Iberia 1–9 Skuri (21 June)
- Longest winning run: Locomotive II (7 matches)
- Longest unbeaten run: Shturmi (13)
- Longest winless run: Iberia (16)
- Longest losing run: Iberia (16)
- All statistics correct as of complete.

The 2022 Liga 4 was the fourth season of fourth-tier football in Georgia under its current title. The season began on 5 April and ended on 20 November.

== Team changes ==
The following teams have changed division since the previous season:

=== To Liga 4 ===
Relegated from Liga 3

Magaroeli • Didube Tbilisi

Promoted from Regionuli Liga

Locomotive II • Samgurali II

=== From Liga 4 ===
Promoted to Liga 3

Dinamo Tbilisi II • Zestaponi • Borjomi • Irao Tbilisi

Relegated to Regionuli Liga

Torpedo Kutaisi II • Tbilisi • Imereti • Egrisi

== Teams and locations ==
Location of Liga 4 football clubs

Sixteen teams took part in the tournament in 2022. Two of them had previously been members of the first tier: Sulori (1991, 1991–92) and Magaroeli (1993–94, 1997–98). Four more spots were occupied by reserve teams of higher league clubs.

Teams in 2022
Club	Position last season	Location	Region
Algeti	5th in Relegation Round	Marneuli	Kvemo Kartli
Betlemi	5th	Keda	Adjara
Didube	14th in Liga 3	Tbilisi	Tbilisi
Iberia	8th	Tbilisi	Tbilisi
Locomotive II	1st in Reg.Liga East	Tbilisi	Tbilisi
Magaroeli	13th in Liga 3	Chiatura	Imereti
Margveti 2006	10th	Zestaponi	Imereti
Matchakhela	6th in Relegation Round	Khelvachauri	Adjara
Merani II	2nd in Relegation Round	Martvili	Samegrelo-Z.Svaneti
Odishi 1919	1st in Relegation Round	Zugdidi	Samegrelo-Z.Svaneti
Samegrelo	4th in Relegation Round	Chkhorotsku	Samegrelo-Z.Svaneti
Samgurali II	1st in Reg.Liga West	Tskaltubo	Imereti
Shturmi	3rd in Relegation Round	Sartichala	Kvemo Kartli
Skuri	9th	Tsalenjikha	Samegrelo-Z.Svaneti
Sulori	7th	Vani	Imereti
WIT Georgia II	6th	Tbilisi	Tbilisi

== League table ==
Pos	Team	Pld	W	D	L	GF	GA	GD	Pts	Promotion, qualification or relegation
1	Locomotive II (C, P)	30	21	5	4	82	40	+42	68	Promotion to the Liga 3
2	Shturmi (P)	30	21	4	5	72	24	+48	67	Promotion to the Liga 3
3	Matchakhela (P)	30	20	4	6	60	26	+34	64	Promotion to the Liga 3
4	Betlemi	30	20	3	7	60	29	+31	63	
5	Skuri	30	13	7	10	46	40	+6	46	
6	WIT Georgia II	30	13	5	12	62	44	+18	44	
7	Sulori	30	12	5	13	35	40	−5	41	
8	Samgurali II	30	12	5	13	52	45	+7	41	
9	Margveti 2006	30	10	9	11	59	68	−9	39	
10	Merani II	30	11	5	14	45	57	−12	38	
11	Odishi 1919	30	10	6	14	41	43	−2	36	
12	Algeti	30	11	3	16	42	60	−18	36	
13	Didube (R)	30	8	8	14	30	44	−14	32	Relegation to Regionuli Liga
14	Samegrelo (R)	30	9	1	20	44	62	−18	28	Relegation to Regionuli Liga
15	Magaroeli (R)	30	6	6	18	37	75	−38	24	Relegation to Regionuli Liga
16	Iberia (R)	30	5	0	25	27	97	−70	15	Relegation to Regionuli Liga

Source: gff.ge
Rules for classification: 1) Points; 2) Head-to-head points; 3) Head-to-head goal difference; 4) Head-to-head goals scored; 5) Head-to-head away goals scored (only if two teams); 6) Goal difference; 7) Goals scored.
(C) Champions; (P) Promoted; (R) Relegated

Following this season, Locomotive II achieved a back-to-back promotion, while Didube and Magaroeli suffered a double relegation. After the first round Iberia Tbilisi withdrew from the tournament with a 3–0 win awarded to each of their opponents in the second half.

=== Results ===
Home \ Away	ALG	BET	DID	IBR	LOC	MAG	MRG	MAT	MRN	ODS	SAM	SMG	STR	SKR	SUL	WIT
Algeti		0–3	3–0	3–0	1–1	3–1	1–4	2–1	2–0	2–3	0–4	3–3	4–0	0–0	1–0	2–3
Betlemi	4–1		1–0	4–0	2–2	1–0	4–1	0–1	4–1	2–0	3–2	2–1	2–1	4–0	3–0	0–0
Didube	0–2	1–2		3–0	1–2	5–1	4–3	0–4	1–1	1–0	2–0	0–0	0–1	0–1	0–1	2–5
Iberia	3–2	0–3	1–3		1–3	0–3	0–3	0–3	0–3	3–1	0–3	3–1	1–3	1–9	0–3	2–7
Locomotive II	5–1	5–2	3–0	3–0		1–2	4–3	3–0	2–1	0–0	4–0	4–2	0–3	3–0	3–2	2–2
Magaroeli	2–1	0–1	1–2	4–6	1–3		3–2	1–1	0–0	0–3	4–3	1–1	2–2	2–4	1–0	1–4
Margveti 2006	3–1	3–3	1–1	5–1	2–8	1–0		0–0	5–1	1–1	1–1	1–0	0–1	5–2	3–1	3–1
Matchakhela	3–0	1–0	4–0	3–2	4–3	4–2	2–2		4–0	2–0	3–2	1–0	1–0	2–0	0–1	2–0
Merani II	0–1	0–1	0–0	3–1	1–4	6–0	1–1	3–1		2–2	3–2	0–1	4–1	3–1	4–1	2–1
Odishi 1919	3–0	0–2	1–1	3–0	1–2	5–1	3–1	0–3	0–1		1–0	4–1	1–1	0–1	2–3	1–1
Samegrelo	4–3	1–4	0–1	0–1	1–2	4–1	4–3	0–3	2–1	0–2		3–0	2–0	1–3	1–0	1–5
Samgurali II	3–0	2–0	2–2	3–0	1–2	4–1	5–0	1–3	6–1	4–0	3–1		0–4	3–1	3–1	2–1
Shturmi	4–0	3–1	2–0	3–0	2–1	2–1	6–0	2–0	8–1	3–0	2–0	2–0		2–0	4–1	5–0
Skuri	3–0	2–1	0–0	3–0	0–2	0–0	0–0	1–1	1–0	3–1	3–0	2–1	1–1		2–1	2–2
Sulori	0–2	1–0	0–0	4–1	2–2	1–1	1–1	1–0	3–0	0–2	2–0	1–1	0–3	1–0		2–0
WIT Georgia II	0–1	0–1	2–0	3–0	2–3	5–0	8–1	0–3	1–2	2–1	2–0	1–0	1–1	3–1	0–1	

Source: Liga 4 results
Legend: Blue = home team win; Yellow = draw; Red = away team win.
