= 2025 Liga 3 (Georgia) =

Football season in Georgia

Liga 3
- Season: 2025
- Dates: 26 March – 5 December
- Champions: Shturmi (1st title)
- Promoted: Shturmi; Gori; Odishi 1919; Aragvi
- Relegated: Locomotive-2; Borjomi; Bakhmaro
- Matches: 240
- Goals: 782 (3.26 per match)
- Top goalscorer: Guram Lukava (20 goals)
- Biggest home win: 8–0; WIT Georgia vs Margveti 2006 (5 September)
- Biggest away win: 1–7 Borjomi vs Shturmi (17 June); 0–6; Margveti 2006 vs Orbi (17 April)
- Highest scoring: 6–4; Shturmi vs Didube (5 December)
- Longest winning run: Odishi 1919 (6 matches)
- Longest unbeaten run: Gori (24)
- Longest winless run: Kolkheti (14)
- Longest losing run: Bakhmaro (9)
- All statistics correct as of complete.

The 2025 Liga 3 season was the 9th edition under its current title and the 37th edition of third tier football in Georgia. The regular two-round tournament commenced on 26 March and ended on 5 December with two-legged promotion play-offs completed on 15 December. Each team played thirty matches in as many rounds.

There were sixteen teams competing in the league this season. Four of them, namely Borjomi, Kolkheti, Merani Tbilisi and WIT Georgia had participated in the top tier with the latter being the two-time national champions.

Gori had the longest tenure in the league with the 10th consecutive season while WIT Georgia were the only team making their debut in Liga 3.

== Team changes ==
The following teams have changed division since the previous season:

=== To Liga 3 ===
Promoted from Liga 4

Didube • Margveti 2006 • Odishi 1919

Relegated from Liga 2

Aragvi • Shturmi • WIT Georgia • Kolkheti

=== From Liga 3 ===
Relegated to Liga 4

Zestaponi • Machakhela • Guria

Promoted to Liga 2

Gonio • Meshakhte • Merani M • Iberia 1999 B

== Teams ==
Locations of Liga 3 football clubs in 2025

The clubs are listed below in alphabetical order.

Clubs	Position last season	Location	Region
Aragvi (Note: Played their home matches in other cities)	7th in Liga 2	Dusheti	Mtskheta-Mtianeti
Bakhmaro	13th	Chokhatauri	Guria
Betlemi	8th	Keda	Adjara
Borjomi	12th	Borjomi	Samtskhe
Didube	1st in Liga 4	Tbilisi	Tbilisi
Gardabani	10th	Gardabani	Kvemo Kartli
Gori	6th	Gori	Shida Kartli
Kolkheti	10th in Liga 2	Khobi	Samegrelo
Locomotive-2	9th	Tbilisi	Tbilisi
Margveti 2006	2nd in Liga 4	Zestaponi	Imereti
Merani Tbilisi	7th	Tbilisi	Tbilisi
Odishi 1919	3rd in Liga 4	Zugdidi	Samegrelo
Orbi	5th	Tbilisi	Tbilisi
Shturmi	8th in Liga 2	Sartichala	Kvemo Kartli
Tbilisi 2025 (Note: Known as Varketili until this season)	11th	Tbilisi	Tbilisi
WIT Georgia	9th in Liga 2	Tbilisi	Tbilisi

== League table ==
Pos	Team	Pld	W	D	L	GF	GA	GD	Pts	Promotion, qualification or relegation
1	Shturmi (C, P)	30	21	7	2	68	22	+46	70	Promotion to Erovnuli Liga 2
2	Gori (P)	30	20	7	3	58	28	+30	67	Promotion to Erovnuli Liga 2
3	Odishi 1919 (P)	30	20	4	6	59	19	+40	64	Qualification for promotion play-offs
4	Aragvi (P)	30	19	6	5	79	35	+44	63	Qualification for promotion play-offs
5	Tbilisi 2025	30	17	7	6	59	32	+27	58	
6	WIT Georgia	30	14	10	6	64	32	+32	52	
7	Orbi	30	11	11	8	58	40	+18	44	
8	Didube	30	12	7	11	47	43	+4	43	
9	Merani Tbilisi	30	8	8	14	39	52	−13	32	
10	Betlemi	30	7	8	15	43	71	−28	29	
11	Gardabani	30	8	5	17	37	67	−30	29	
12	Margveti 2006	30	7	7	16	36	71	−35	28	
13	Locomotive-2 (R)	30	8	3	19	43	68	−25	27	Relegation to Liga 4
14	Kolkheti	30	7	5	18	35	63	−28	26	
15	Borjomi (R)	30	6	5	19	34	60	−26	23	Relegation to Liga 4
16	Bakhmaro (R)	30	3	4	23	18	74	−56	13	Relegation to Liga 4

Rules for classification: 1) Points; 2) Head-to-head points; 3) Head-to-head goal difference; 4) Head-to-head goals scored; 5) Head-to-head away goals scored (only if two teams); 6) Goal difference; 7) Goals scored.
(C) Champions; (P) Promoted; (R) Relegated

Note: Locomotive-2 were demoted following their senior team's relegation from Liga 2.

== Results ==
=== Regular season ===
Home \ Away	ARA	BKH	BET	BOR	DID	GAR	GOR	KOL	LC2	MAR	MER	ODI	ORB	SHT	VAR	WIT
Aragvi		4–1	5–0	4–1	3–1	2–2	6–0	7–1	2–1	6–2	1–0	2–4	2–2	1–1	1–2	1–0
Bakhmaro	0–5		0–4	1–2	0–1	0–1	0–0	0–1	0–1	2–4	1–1	0–2	0–5	0–2	2–6	0–4
Betlemi	3–5	0–1		2–2	1–2	4–1	0–0	1–0	4–1	2–2	4–0	0–2	1–3	0–3	1–4	1–1
Borjomi	0–1	4–1	4–2		1–2	1–2	1–2	0–1	3–2	1–0	0–0	1–2	0–2	1–7	0–1	0–1
Didube	0–3	5–0	2–2	3–0		2–0	2–1	3–0	3–3	2–0	2–0	1–2	2–2	1–1	1–1	0–2
Gardabani	2–5	2–1	1–3	0–2	1–1		0–1	2–1	5–2	5–1	2–0	1–0	1–2	0–0	1–2	0–1
Gori	1–0	2–1	6–0	3–1	1–0	5–0		6–1	4–2	1–1	2–1	1–0	2–0	2–1	0–2	2–0
Kolkheti	0–1	0–3	4–0	2–1	3–1	6–1	1–3		0–2	1–1	1–1	1–3	2–2	0–1	0–2	2–2
Locomotive-2	2–6	0–0	2–2	3–1	1–2	1–0	0–2	3–1		1–2	0–1	2–4	0–3	0–2	2–3	1–2
Margveti 2006	0–1	1–1	2–1	2–2	0–0	2–1	1–1	2–0	1–2		2–1	0–3	0–6	1–2	4–2	1–3
Merani Tbilisi	0–1	0–3	1–1	2–2	2–0	4–2	1–1	3–1	1–2	3–2		0–1	4–3	3–0	3–2	1–4
Odishi 1919	4–1	5–0	1–2	1–0	1–0	5–0	0–1	3–0	4–1	4–0	3–0		1–1	0–0	2–0	2–1
Orbi	3–3	1–0	2–2	3–0	1–2	2–2	2–3	1–1	1–3	3–1	2–0	2–0		0–1	1–3	1–1
Shturmi	0–0	5–0	6–0	3–1	6–4	5–0	2–2	2–0	2–1	3–0	4–3	1–0	2–1		1–0	3–0
Tbilisi 2025	2–0	1–0	3–0	3–0	3–1	4–0	0–0	2–3	3–1	3–1	2–2	0–0	0–0	0–0		1–3
WIT Georgia	0–0	5–0	5–0	2–2	2–1	2–2	2–3	4–1	4–1	8–0	1–1	0–0	1–1	1–2	2–2	

Legend: Blue = home team win; Yellow = draw; Red = away team win.

=== Top goalscorers ===
As of 7 December 2025

Rank	Player	Club	Goals
1	(Georgia (country)) Guram Lukava	Aragvi	20
2	(Georgia (country)) Otar Kvernadze	Odishi 1919	19
3	(Georgia (country)) Tornike Kereselidze	Didube	16
3	(Georgia (country)) Irakli Lekvtadze	Shturmi	16

=== Discipline ===
Most red cards: 5

• Orbi

Fewest red cards: 0

• WIT Georgia

• Merani

== Promotion playoffs ==
11 December 2025
13:00

Aragvi	2–3	Locomotive
Lukava 6' (pen.), 84'	Report	Amoako 25'; Kekelidze 72' (pen.); Vibliani 90'

Shatili stadium, Tbilisi
Referee: A.Parjikia
15 December 2025
16:00

Locomotive	0–1 (a.e.t.) (6–7 p)	Aragvi
	Report	Janelidze 29'; Feli (red card) 111'

Saguramo
Referee: G.Avazashvili

11 December 2025
13:30

Iberia 1999 B	2–2	Odishi 1919
Gogsadze 31', 72'; Kukalia (red card) 79'	Report	Bochorishvili 86'; Sylla 90+2'

Bendela
Referee: T.Samsonashvili
15 December 2025
13:00

Odishi 1919	2–1	Iberia 1999 B
Akondo 61'; Kvernadze 87' (pen.)	Report	Dadiani 90+5'

Ganmukhuri
Referee: A.Aptsiauri

Odishi 1919 and Aragvi advanced to Erovnuli Liga 2

== See also ==
• 2025 Erovnuli Liga

• 2025 Erovnuli Liga 2

• 2025 Liga 4

• 2025 Georgian Cup
