= 2025 Erovnuli Liga 2 =

Georgian second tier football season

Erovnuli Liga 2
- Season: 2025
- Dates: 8 March – 6 December
- Champions: Rustavi
- Promoted: Rustavi; Spaeri; Meshakhte
- Relegated: Locomotive; Iberia 1999 B Gonio; Dinamo Tbilisi-2
- Matches: 180
- Goals: 460 (2.56 per match)
- Top goalscorer: Javokhir Esonkulov (22 goals)
- Biggest home win: 5–0; Sioni vs Gonio (6 December)
- Biggest away win: 0–4; Gonio vs Iberia 1999 B (20 May); Dinamo-2 vs Meshakhte (20 May); Gonio vs Rustavi (29 November)
- Highest scoring: 3–5; Merani vs Spaeri (2 April); Sioni vs Locomotive (19 September)
- Longest winning run: Rustavi (6 games)
- Longest unbeaten run: Spaeri (12)
- Longest winless run: Dinamo-2 (19)
- Longest losing run: Dinamo-2 (9)
- All statistics correct as of complete.

The 2025 Erovnuli Liga 2 season was the ninth edition under its current title and the 37th edition of second-tier football in Georgia. The four-part competition began on 8 March and ended on 6 December with playoffs completed by mid-December.

Each team played 36 matches this season. The winners gained automatic promotion to the Erovnuli Liga, while the next two teams participate in play-offs against their top-flight rivals. The bottom two teams enter play-off contest against 3rd and 4th teams of Liga 3 at the end of the season with two-legged ties set to be played at each side's home ground.

== Team changes ==
The following teams have changed division since the 2024 season:

=== To Erovnuli Liga 2 ===
Promoted from Liga 3

• Gonio • Meshakhte • Merani • Iberia 1999 B

Relegated from Erovnuli Liga

• Samtredia

=== From Erovnuli Liga 2 ===
Promoted to Erovnuli Liga

• Gareji

Relegated to Liga 3

• Aragvi • Shturmi • WIT Georgia • Kolkheti

== Teams ==
Location of Liga 2 football clubs in 2025

Based on their performance in the previous year, the following ten teams were competing in Erovnuli Liga 2 this season.

| Club | Position last season | Location | Region |
|---|---|---|---|
| Dinamo-2 | 6th | Didube, Tbilisi | Tbilisi |
| Gonio | 1st in Liga 3 | Gonio, Batumi | Adjara |
| Iberia-2 1999 | 4th in Liga 3 | Saburtalo, Tbilisi | Tbilisi |
| Locomotive | 4th | Vake, Tbilisi | Tbilisi |
| Merani | 3rd in Liga 3 | Martvili | Samegrelo |
| Meshakhte | 2nd in Liga 3 | Tkibuli | Imereti |
| Rustavi | 2nd | Rustavi | Kvemo Kartli |
| Samtredia | 10th in Erovnuli Liga | Samtredia | Imereti |
| Sioni | 3rd | Bolnisi | Kvemo Kartli |
| Spaeri | 5th | Vazisubani, Tbilisi | Tbilisi |

Notes:

- Rustavi, Locomotive, Sioni and Samtredia had previously taken part in the main division with the last two clubs being also the national champions.
- Gonio and Iberia 1999 B were the league debutants.
- As the reserve teams of Dinamo Tbilisi and Iberia 1999, Dinamo-2 and Iberia 1999 B were ineligible for promotion.

== Managerial changes ==
| Team | Outgoing manager | Date of vacancy | Incoming manager | Ref |
|---|---|---|---|---|
| Rustavi | Varlam Kilasonia | 23 April | Giorgi Tsetsadze | |
| Sioni | Giorgi Chelidze | 14 May | Varlam Kilasonia | |
| Samtredia | Mikheil Ashvetia | 7 May | Eugenio Sena | |
| Dinamo-2 | Vakhtang Iagorashvili | 18 May | Vasil Geguchadze | |
| Gonio | Levan Jokhadze | 8 June | Revaz Gotsiridze | |
| Dinamo-2 | Vasil Geguchadze | 10 September | Davit Gelashvili | |
| Gonio | Revaz Gotsiridze | 1 October | Levan Jokhadze | |

== League table ==
| Pos | Team | Pld | W | D | L | GF | GA | GD | Pts | |
|---|---|---|---|---|---|---|---|---|---|---|
| 1 | Rustavi (C, P) | 36 | 21 | 8 | 7 | 62 | 30 | +32 | 71 | Promotion to 2026 Erovnuli Liga |
| 2 | Spaeri (P) | 36 | 17 | 13 | 6 | 54 | 34 | +20 | 64 | Qualification for the Promotion play-offs |
| 3 | Meshakhte (P) | 36 | 13 | 13 | 10 | 34 | 25 | +9 | 52 | Qualification for the Promotion play-offs |
| 4 | Merani | 36 | 13 | 11 | 12 | 41 | 55 | −14 | 50 | |
| 5 | Sioni | 36 | 12 | 12 | 12 | 50 | 44 | +6 | 48 | |
| 6 | Samtredia | 36 | 11 | 13 | 12 | 44 | 42 | +2 | 46 | |
| 7 | Locomotive (R) | 36 | 11 | 12 | 13 | 54 | 55 | −1 | 45 | Qualification to Relegation play-offs |
| 8 | Iberia 1999 B (R) | 36 | 10 | 12 | 14 | 40 | 44 | −4 | 42 | Qualification to Relegation play-offs |
| 9 | Gonio (R) | 36 | 9 | 10 | 17 | 42 | 57 | −15 | 37 | Relegation to the 2026 Liga 3 |
| 10 | Dinamo-2 (R) | 36 | 6 | 10 | 20 | 41 | 76 | −35 | 28 | Relegation to the 2026 Liga 3 |

Source: Erovnuli Liga 2
Rules for classification: 1) Points; 2) Head-to-head points; 3) Head-to-head goal difference; 4) Head-to-head goals scored; 5) Head-to-head away goals scored (only if two teams); 6) Goal difference; 7) Goals scored.
(C) Champions; (P) Promoted; (R) Relegated

== Results ==
=== Regular season ===
==== Round 1-18 ====
| Home \ Away | DT2 | GON | IB2 | LOC | MER | MES | RST | SMT | SBL | SPA |
|---|---|---|---|---|---|---|---|---|---|---|
| Dinamo-2 | — | 1–1 | 1–2 | 0–1 | 0–1 | 0–4 | 1–1 | 2–2 | 1–2 | 0–1 |
| Gonio | 3–1 | — | 0–4 | 2–1 | 3–0 | 0–1 | 1–2 | 2–2 | 0–2 | 1–2 |
| Iberia 1999 B | 3–1 | 0–1 | — | 1–1 | 0–1 | 0–0 | 2–0 | 2–1 | 0–0 | 1–1 |
| Locomotive | 4–2 | 1–1 | 4–2 | — | 1–2 | 0–1 | 2–2 | 2–1 | 0–0 | 1–1 |
| Merani | 2–1 | 1–3 | 1–0 | 0–2 | — | 1–0 | 2–1 | 1–0 | 1–1 | 3–5 |
| Meshakhte | 1–1 | 1–0 | 1–0 | 1–1 | 1–2 | — | 0–0 | 4–0 | 1–1 | 0–0 |
| Rustavi | 2–0 | 2–2 | 2–0 | 2–1 | 3–2 | 1–0 | — | 1–0 | 1–0 | 0–2 |
| Samtredia | 0–1 | 1–1 | 1–1 | 1–1 | 4–1 | 0–0 | 1–1 | — | 0–0 | 1–0 |
| Sioni | 2–1 | 1–1 | 1–1 | 1–0 | 2–2 | 3–0 | 1–1 | 0–1 | — | 0–1 |
| Spaeri | 3–3 | 2–0 | 3–0 | 3–1 | 3–0 | 1–1 | 0–0 | 2–1 | 3–0 | — |

Source: Liga 2 results
Legend: Blue = home team win; Yellow = draw; Red = away team win.

==== Round 19-36 ====
| Home \ Away | DT2 | GON | IB2 | LOC | MER | MES | RST | SMT | SBL | SPA |
|---|---|---|---|---|---|---|---|---|---|---|
| Dinamo-2 | — | 2–2 | 2–0 | 1–3 | 1–1 | 2–1 | 0–3 | 1–2 | 1–4 | 2–1 |
| Gonio | 1–2 | — | 2–0 | 2–1 | 4–0 | 0–2 | 0–4 | 1–3 | 2–2 | 0–1 |
| Iberia 1999 B | 4–0 | 1–1 | — | 2–1 | 0–0 | 2–1 | 0–0 | 0–1 | 0–0 | 1–2 |
| Locomotive | 5–1 | 1–1 | 1–1 | — | 1–1 | 0–1 | 3–2 | 1–0 | 3–4 | 0–3 |
| Merani | 2–2 | 2–0 | 3–2 | 1–1 | — | 1–1 | 0–3 | 1–1 | 2–4 | 1–1 |
| Meshakhte | 3–0 | 1–0 | 1–2 | 0–0 | 0–1 | — | 1–3 | 1–1 | 1–0 | 0–0 |
| Rustavi | 3–0 | 1–0 | 2–1 | 5–1 | 2–0 | 1–2 | — | 3–0 | 1–2 | 2–0 |
| Samtredia | 2–2 | 3–2 | 4–0 | 2–0 | 1–2 | 1–1 | 0–2 | — | 2–1 | 1–1 |
| Sioni | 1–2 | 5–0 | 2–4 | 3–5 | 1–0 | 1–0 | 1–2 | 0–3 | — | 3–0 |
| Spaeri | 3–3 | 1–2 | 1–1 | 2–3 | 0–0 | 1–0 | 2–1 | 1–1 | 1–0 | — |

Source: Liga 2 results
Legend: Blue = home team win; Yellow = draw; Red = away team win.

== Season statistics ==
=== Top scorers ===
As of 6 December 2025

| Rank | Player | Club | Goals |
|---|---|---|---|
| 1 | (Uzbekistan) Javokhir Esonkulov | Merani | 22 |
| 2 | (Georgia (country)) Data Sitchinava | Sioni | 20 |
| 3 | (Georgia (country)) Levan Kutalia | Rustavi / Samtredia | 14 |
| 4 | (Georgia (country)) Saba Gegiadze | Spaeri | 13 |
| 4 | (Brazil) Jean Souza de Almeida | Rustavi | 13 |

=== Clean sheets ===
As of 6 December 2025

| Rank | Player | Club | Clean sheets |
|---|---|---|---|
| 1 | (Georgia (country)) Levan Shovnadze | Rustavi | 13 |
| 2 | (Georgia (country)) Avtandil Labadze | Meshakhte | 12 |
| 2 | (Georgia (country)) Bukhuti Putkaradze | Spaeri | 12 |

=== Discipline ===
As of 6 December 2025

Most red cards: 9

• Dinamo-2

Fewest red cards: 0

• Gonio

== Promotion playoffs ==
10 December 2025
13:30

| Meshakhte | 1–1 | Telavi |
|---|---|---|
| C.Timi 39' | Report | Devdariani 56' |

Agrano Vachadze stadium, Ambrolauri
Referee: G.Machitidze
14 December 2025
18:00

| Telavi | 1–1 (a.e.t.) (2–4 p) | Meshakhte |
|---|---|---|
| Martin 31' (pen.); Devdariani (red card) 103' | Report | Fobi 74' |

Davit Petriashvili Arena, Tbilisi
Referee: G.Kikacheishvili

10 December 2025
16:00

| Gareji | 0–2 | Spaeri |
|---|---|---|
| | Report | Basilashvili 25'; Gegiadze 71' |

Mikheil Meskhi 2
Referee: J.Khorava
14 December 2025
19:00

| Spaeri | 1–2 | Gareji |
|---|---|---|
| Basilashvili 28' | Report | Papava 53' (pen.), 63' (pen.); Kamladze (red card) 56' |

Spaeri stadium
Referee: G.Kruashvili

Both Spaeri and Meshakhte won the playoffs and advanced to Erovnuli Liga

== Relegation playoffs ==
11 December 2025
13:00

| Aragvi | 2–3 | Locomotive |
|---|---|---|
| Lukava 6' (pen.), 84' | Report | Amoako 25'; Kekelidze 72' (pen.); Vibliani 90' |

Shatili stadium, Tbilisi
Referee: A.Parjikia
15 December 2025
16:00

| Locomotive | 0–1 (a.e.t.) (6–7 p) | Aragvi |
|---|---|---|
| | Report | Janelidze 29'; Feli (red card) 111' |

Saguramo
Referee: G.Avazashvili

11 December 2025
13:30

| Iberia 1999 B | 2–2 | Odishi 1919 |
|---|---|---|
| Gogsadze 31', 72'; Kukalia (red card) 79' | Report | Bochorishvili 86'; Sylla 90+2' |

Bendela
Referee: T.Samsonashvili
15 December 2025
13:00

| Odishi 1919 | 2–1 | Iberia 1999 B |
|---|---|---|
| Akondo 61'; Kvernadze 87' (pen.) | Report | Dadiani 90+5' |

Ganmukhuri
Referee: A.Aptsiauri

Locomotive and Iberia 1999 B were relegated
