= 2017 Georgian Cup =

Tournament details
- Country: Georgia
- Teams: 80

Final positions
- Champions: Chikhura Sachkhere
- Runners-up: Torpedo Kutaisi

Tournament statistics
- Matches played: 79
- Goals scored: 239 (3.03 per match)

The 2017 Georgian Cup began on 1 March 2017 and ended on 2 December 2017. The winners of this season's cup (Chikhura Sachkhere) earned a place in the 2018–19 Europa League and will enter in the first qualifying round.

Torpedo Kutaisi were the defending champions.

== Format ==
For the 2017 season, the Georgian Cup was a single elimination tournament between 80 clubs. Level matches after regulation went to extra time and then to penalties, when needed, to decide the winning club.

== First round ==
Twelve first round matches were played on 1 March 2017.

Team 1	Score	Team 2
Odishi 1919 II	0–4	Zana Abasha
Samgurali II	4–1	Imereti II
Lesichine	3–0	Dinamo Batumi II
Machakhela	3–2	Egrisi
Alazani	0–1	Abuli
Sinatle	6–0	Meskheti
Liakhvi Achabeti	6–1	Sarti
Dinamo Sokhumi	2–1	STU
Voyage	3–2	Racha
Hereti Chabukiani	2–2 (a.e.t.) (5–4 p)	Tori
35-e Skola	2–1	Tbilisi 2016
Saburtalo II	1–0	Iberia

== Second round ==
Twenty-four second round matches were played on 5 March 2017.

Team 1	Score	Team 2
Real Varketili	3–1	Liakhvi Tskhinvali
Gareji	4–2	Sinatle
Kolkhi	5–0	Iveria
Tskhumi	0–2 (a.e.t.)	Gori
WIT Georgia II	1–2	Algeti Marneuli
Kojaeli	0–7	Saburtalo II
Voyage	0–4	Gardabani
Rustavi II	1–3	Locomotive Tbilisi II
Telavi	2–0	Chkherimela
Hereti Chabukiani	1–6	Norchi Dinamoeli
Abuli	1–4	Dinamo Sokhumi
Mark Stars	3–0	Borjomi
Liakhvi Achabeti	1–1 (a.e.t.) (4–2 p)	35-e Skola
Aragvi Dusheti	0–4	Shevardeni 1906
Odishi 1919	0–1	Imereti
Zana Abasha	0–0 (a.e.t.) (0–3 p)	Samegrelo
Samgurali II	5–2	Sulori Vani
Mertskhali	1–2 (a.e.t.)	Margveti 2006
Machakhela	2–3	Betlemi Keda
Torpedo Kutaisi II	1–2 (a.e.t.)	Chiatura
Salkhino Martvili	0–2	Sapovnela Terjola
Sairme	1–2 (a.e.t.)	Skuri
Lesichine	1–0	Khikhani
Bakhmaro	1–1 (a.e.t.) (2–4 p)	Kolkheti Khobi

== Third round ==
Twelve third round matches were played on 9–10 March 2017.

Team 1	Score	Team 2
Samegrelo	2–0	Margveti 2006
Real Varketili	1–2 (a.e.t.)	Gori
Sapovnela Terjola	1–0	Mark Stars
Locomotive Tbilisi II	2–3 (a.e.t.)	Algeti Marneuli
Chiatura	2–0	Telavi
Kolkheti Khobi	0–1	Imereti
Lesichine	1–0 (a.e.t.)	Dinamo Sokhumi
Gareji	4–0	Saburtalo II
Liakhvi Achabeti	0–1	Skuri
Gardabani	3–4	Norchi Dinamoeli
Shevardeni 1906	2–0	Betlemi Keda
Samgurali II	2–1	Kolkhi

== Fourth round ==
Sixteen fourth round matches were played on 15 March 2017.

Team 1	Score	Team 2
Gagra	2–0	Meshakhte Tkibuli
Norchi Dinamoeli	1–0	Locomotive Tbilisi
Kolkheti Poti	1–0	Dinamo Batumi
Zugdidi	3–2 (a.e.t.)	Tskhinvali
Sapovnela Terjola	0–2	Torpedo Kutaisi
Lesichine	0–7	Chikhura Sachkhere
Algeti Marneuli	0–2	Dinamo Tbilisi
Samgurali II	0–4	Dila Gori
Gareji	0–1	Imereti
Skuri	1–3	Sioni
Gori	1–1 (a.e.t.) (6–5 p)	Shukura Kobuleti
Chiatura	1–4 (a.e.t.)	Samgurali Tskaltubo
Samegrelo	1–1 (a.e.t.) (3–5 p)	Guria
WIT Georgia	1–2	Samtredia
Rustavi	1–0	Merani Martvili
Shevardeni 1906	3–0	Saburtalo Tbilisi

== Fifth round ==
Eight fifth round matches were played on 25–26 April 2017.

Team 1	Score	Team 2
Rustavi	3–2	Zugdidi
Imereti	1–0	Sioni
Dila Gori	1–0	Kolkheti Poti
Gagra	0–2	Chikhura Sachkhere
Samgurali Tskaltubo	0–2	Dinamo Tbilisi
Gori	0–0 (a.e.t.) (3–4 p)	Norchi Dinamoeli
Shevardeni 1906	2–0	Guria
Torpedo Kutaisi	2–0	Samtredia

== Quarter–finals ==
The quarter-final matches were played on 12–13 September 2017.

Team 1	Score	Team 2
Imereti	2–2 (a.e.t.) (4–2 p)	Norchi Dinamoeli
Shevardeni 1906	1–2	Torpedo Kutaisi
Chikhura Sachkhere	3–0	Dila Gori
Rustavi	0–0 (a.e.t.) (0–3 p)	Dinamo Tbilisi

== Semi–finals ==
The semi-final matches were played on 1 November 2017.

Team 1	Score	Team 2
Imereti	0–5	Chikhura Sachkhere
Torpedo Kutaisi	0–0 (a.e.t.) (5–4 p)	Dinamo Tbilisi

== Final ==
2 December 2017
15:15

Chikhura Sachkhere	0–0 (a.e.t.)	Torpedo Kutaisi
	Report
Penalties
Gangurava (penalty scored); Tskhadadze (penalty missed); Tatanashvili (penalty scored); Gorgiashvili (penalty scored); Gabedava (penalty scored)	4–3	(penalty missed) Kutalia; (penalty scored) Tabatadze; (penalty scored) Babunashvili; (penalty scored) Kvaskhvadze; (penalty missed) Kukhianidze

Tengiz Burjanadze Stadium, Gori
Attendance: 2,700
Referee: Jener Khorava

== See also ==
- 2017 Erovnuli Liga
- 2017 Erovnuli Liga 2
