= FC Gori =

- Founded: 2015; 11 years ago
- Ground: Kartli Stadium, Gori
- Capacity: 1,500
- Manager: Giorgi Basilidze
- Coach: Giorgi Balashvili
- League: Liga 2
- 2025: Liga 3, 2nd of 16 (promoted)
- Website: fcgori.ge
Home colours	Away colours	Third colours

FC Gori is a Georgian association football club, based in Gori. Following the 2025 season, they were promoted to Liga 2, the second tier of Georgian football.

The Kartli stadium is Gori's home ground.

== History ==
Established in 2015, FC Gori to this day retains the status of a municipal non-commercial legal entity.

The team achieved their best result in Liga 3 in 2016 when they won the tournament after an unbeaten run during the entire season. But in this transitional season all group winners were denied promotion.

Gori made a remarkable success a year later by knocking out Erovnuli Liga team Shukura in the second round of the David Kipiani Cup. The next year the club was eliminated by Torpedo Kutaisi, the cup winners of the season.

FC Gori came close to Liga 2 again in 2020, when they earned a place in play-offs against Merani Martvili. After a goalless draw at home the events in the return leg unfolded unfavourably for Gori when they were reduced to ten men already in the first half with another player sent off later on. This circumstance defined an outcome of the match. Summing up the season, the club management was proud to announce that around 80% of the players were local residents, brought up at the football school of Gori.

Gori spent ten seasons in the 3rd tier before producing a 24-game unbeaten run in 2025. They finished 2nd in the league table and achieved automatic promotion to Liga 2.

== Seasons ==
Season	Div	Pos	M	W	D	L	GF–GA	Pts	Notes	Cup
2016	3rd	1st of 8	14	13	1	0	66-9	40	Group Centre	–
2017	3rd	6th of 10	18	6	5	7	26-24	23	White Group	4th Round
2018	3rd	9th of 20	38	14	11	13	58-48	53		3rd Round
2019	3rd	7th of 10	36	11	6	19	45-52	39		2nd Round
2020	3rd	3rd of 10	18	9	5	4	22-18	32	Promotion play-offs (Note: Lost Liga 2/3 playoffs 3–1 on aggregate to Merani Martvili)	2nd Round
2021	3rd	6th of 14	26	10	8	8	33-33	38		5th Round
2022	3rd	6th of 16	30	15	5	10	58-38	50		2nd Round
2023	3rd	8th of 16	30	13	4	13	46-48	43		2nd Round
2024	3rd	6th of 16	30	15	8	7	49–22	53		1st Round
2025	3rd	2nd of 16	30	20	7	3	58–28	67	Promoted	1st Round

== Current squad ==
As of 15 March 2026

Note: Flags indicate national team as defined under FIFA eligibility rules; some limited exceptions apply. Players may hold more than one non-FIFA nationality.

No.	Pos.	Nation	Player
1	GK	GEO	Paolo Puladze
2	DF	GEO	Beka Rurua
3	DF	GEO	Dimitri Jakhia
4	DF	GEO	Giorgi Berdznishvili
5	MF	GEO	Gogi Mamulashvili
6	DF	GEO	Ucha Khubuluri
7	MF	GEO	Temur Nozadze
8	MF	GEO	Erekle Tabatadze
9	MF	GEO	Luka Sherozia
10	MF	GEO	Giorgi Alimbarashvili
11	FW	GEO	Giorgi Khachapuridze
12	GK	GEO	Erekle Guluashvili
13	DF	GEO	Akaki Sirbiladze

No.	Pos.	Nation	Player
14	FW	GEO	Giorgi Kurmashvili
15	MF	GHA	Benjamin Hamondi
16	MF	GEO	Nika Okropiridze (C)
17	MF	GHA	Amoa Bafuri
18	FW	GEO	Giga Bekadze
19	MF	GEO	Levan Nachkebia
20	DF	GEO	Demetre Merebashvili
22	DF	GEO	Elguja Bibiluri
27	FW	TUN	Yyad Khalifa
33	MF	GEO	Luka Arakelovi
35	DF	GEO	Archil Koberidze
38	MF	GHA	David Asayure

== Honours ==
• Liga 3

Winners (1): 2016 (Group Centre)

Runners-up (1): 2025

Third place (1): 2020

== Managerial history ==
Name	Nat.	From	To
Davit Shubitidze	(Georgia (country))	2016	2021
Vladimer Eliauri	(Georgia (country))	2021	2023
Ilia Mgebrishvili	(Georgia (country))	2024	2026
Levan Jokhadze	(Georgia (country))	2026	2026

== Stadium ==
Built in 1978, the Kartli Stadium is located between two IDP settlements in Gori. It has the capacity of 1,500 seats. In the past it was also home of two other Gori-based clubs, Tskhinvali and Liakhvi.
