= David Chigoev =

Georgian professional footballer

Personal information
- Date of birth: 28 September 1994 (age 32)
- Place of birth: Georgia
- Position: Midfielder

Team information
- Current team: Spaeri

Youth career
- Tskhinvali

Senior career*
Years	Team	Apps	(Gls)
2015	Slavia Mozyr	12	(1)
2018	Varketili		
2019–2022	Spaeri		
2023–	Shturmi		
- * Club domestic league appearances and goals as of 1 December 2015

David Chigoev (Georgian: დავით ჩეგოევი; born 28 September 1994) is a Georgian professional footballer who plays for Shturmi.

== Career ==
In 2015, he played for Slavia Mozyr in Belarus. In 2018 he played for FC Varketili in Georgian Liga 3.
