= Davit Ubilava =

Georgian association football player

Personal information
- Date of birth: 27 January 1994 (age 32)
- Height: 1.70 m (5 ft 7 in)
- Position: Defender

Team information
- Current team: Rustavi
- Number: 40

Senior career*
Years	Team	Apps	(Gls)
2012–2013	WIT Georgia	6	(0)
2013	Torpedo	16	(0)
2014–2021	Locomotive	204	(6)
2022	Saburtalo	7	(0)
2022	Locomotive	13	(0)
2023–2024	Samtredia	70	(4)
2025–	Rustavi	50	(0)

International career^{‡}
2012–2013	Georgia U19	8	(0)
2013–2016	Georgia U21	15	(0)
- * Club domestic league appearances and goals as of 10 July 2026 ‡ National team caps and goals as of 8 April 2025

Davit Ubilava (Georgian: დავით უბილავა, born 27 January 1994) is a Georgian footballer who plays as a left back for Erovnuli Liga club Rustavi.

Ubilava spent most of his career at Locomotive, making 233 appearances across all competitions. He was also a member of the national youth teams. With 15 caps in competitive matches, Ubilava is among the all-time top five national U21 players.

== Career ==
=== Club ===
Ubilava started his career at Georgia's two-time champions WIT Georgia in 2012. Following a half-year tenure with Torpedo, he moved to Locomotive, where he spent ten seasons combined. Ubilava scored his first top-tier goal in a 3–2 home win over Saburtalo on 25 October 2015.

Starting from 2017, Ubilava captained the team. Individually, he was also selected by the Erovnuli Liga among the best eleven players for his display in the autumn of 2018.

In 2020, Ubilava made his first European appearance against Romanian club Craiova. As Locomotive successfully continued their Europa League campaign and reached the 3rd qualifying round, Ubilava played all three games in full.

After the 2022 season, he was among nine players who left the club. Ubilava moved to Samtredia where he took part in 70 out of 72 league games during the next two seasons. Following their relegation in 2024, he signed with Erovnuli Liga 2 side Rustavi. Ubilava made 31 appearances for the team which won the league in 2025 and secured promotion to the top tier.

=== International ===
Ubilava was a squad member of the national U19s which in 2013 qualified for a UEFA European Under-19 Championship for the second time in their history. In addition to six qualifiers, Ubilava played in two European Championship games held in Lithuania.

In the same year, he was called up to the U21 team. In total, from 2013 to 2017 Ubilava took part in 15 competitive matches, becoming one of the five all-time Georgian U21 players with most appearances.

== Honours ==
Locomotive

- Georgian Cup runner-up: 2019

Rustavi

- Liga 2 champion: 2025
