= FC Sairme Bagdati =

fc sairme baghdati
- Full name: Football Club Sairme Bagdati
- Nickname: Deer
- Ground: Bagdatis Tsentraluri Stadioni; Baghdati, Georgia
- Capacity: 3,000
- Chairman: Besik Ebanoidze
- League: Regionuli Liga
- 2025: 10th of 16

FC Sairme (Georgian: საფეხბურთო კლუბი საირმე) is a Georgian football club based in the town of Baghdati. They compete in Regionuli Liga, the fifth tier of Georgian football.

Their home ground is Bagdati's Central Stadium with the capacity of 3,000.

== History ==
Sairme initially started taking part in the second tier of the Georgian Soviet league.

In mid-2010s the club twice in a row came 3rd in Meore Liga, followed by the second place taken in 2016. Sairme under the management of Davit Machitidze finished one point short of a group winner and according to the existing league regulations, dropped down to Regionuli Liga along with all the remaining teams.

With new coach Jaba Akhaladze in the new league, Sairme ended up in mid-table. Soon financial difficulties worsened their performance. In 2020, Sairme played the last season before their formal withdrawal.

After a three-year pause the club resumed functioning in 2024 and joined Group C of the Regionuli Liga tournament.

Since 2025, the club uses a presumably AI generated badge, replacing their old white and blue colour scheme with gold and gray. This new badge is the one currently used on the club's Facebook page.

== Seasons ==
| Season | League | Pos | P | W | D | L | GF | GA | Pts | Domestic Cup |
|---|---|---|---|---|---|---|---|---|---|---|
| 2012/13 | Meore Liga West | 6_{/13} | 24 | 14 | 1 | 9 | 48 | 30 | 43 | – |
| 2013/14 | Meore Liga West | 6_{/13} | 24 | 11 | 2 | 11 | 44 | 41 | 35 | – |
| 2014/15 | Meore Liga West | 3_{/15} | 28 | 19 | 3 | 6 | 59 | 30 | 60 | – |
| 2015/16 | Meore Liga West | 3_{/14} | 26 | 20 | 4 | 2 | 69 | 15 | 64 | – |
| 2016 | Meore Liga West A | 2_{/7}↓ | 12 | 8 | 3 | 1 | 30 | 7 | 27 | – |
| 2017 | Regionuli Liga West A | 9_{/15} | 28 | 11 | 3 | 14 | 64 | 58 | 36 | 2nd Round |
| 2018 | Regionuli Liga West A | 5_{/8} | 13 | 4 | 1 | 8 | 24 | 35 | 13 | 2nd Round |
| 2018 | Relegation Round | | | | | | | | | 2nd Round |
| 2019 | Regionuli Liga West A | 6_{/10} | 9 | 2 | 3 | 4 | 18 | 21 | 9 | – |
| 2019 | Relegation Round | | | | | | | | | – |
| 2020 | Regionuli Liga West A | 7_{/9} | 11 | 3 | 3 | 5 | 22 | 31 | 12 | – |
The club was dissolved in 2021–2023
| 2024 | Regionuli Liga C | 13_{/13} | 24 | 3 | 4 | 17 | 30 | 78 | 13 | – |
| 2025 | Regionuli Liga C | 10_{/16} | 30 | 10 | 8 | 12 | 51 | 55 | 38 | – |

== Name ==
The club was named after the Sairme balneological resort, located in 25 km from the town of Bagdati.
