= Giorgi Tsetsadze =

Armenian footballer & manager (born 1974)

Personal information
- Date of birth: 3 September 1974 (age 52)

Team information
- Current team: Rustavi (head coach)

Managerial career
- Years: Team
- 2008–2010: Georgia U17 (assistant)
- 2010–2011: Dila Gori
- 2012: Dila Gori (assistant)
- 2013: Georgia U19
- 2013: Lokomotivi Tbilisi
- 2015: Georgia (assistant)
- 2015–2017: Samtredia
- 2017–2019: Georgia U21
- 2018: Samtredia
- 2020: Saburtalo Tbilisi
- 2020–2021: Lviv
- 2021–2022: Torpedo Kutaisi
- 2022–2023: Telavi
- 2025–: Rustavi

Giorgi (Gia) Tsetsadze (Georgian: გია ცეცაძე, born on 3 September 1974) is a Georgian football manager, currently in charge of Erovnuli Liga club Rustavi.

He has won the national league and the Supercup.

== Career ==
In 2011 Tsetsadze led FC Dila Gori to gain promotion to the Georgia top division (Umaglesi Liga). In 2013 he managed the Georgia national under-19 football team qualifying with it for the 2013 UEFA European Under-19 Championship. It was the second time the team qualified for such tournament and the first time since organization was shifted from under-18 competition to under-19.

In 2016 along with FC Samtredia Tsetsadze became a winning head coach in the Georgian national league and the first national title for the club.

Between 2017 and 2020 Tsetsadze was the head coach of the national U21s.

In June 2020 Tsetsadze was placed at the head of the FC Lviv coaching staff. He was helped by Vitaliy Shumskyi and Ihor Rypnovskyi.

Earlier in 2020 Tsetsadze resigned from the manager post of Saburtalo Tbilisi before the start of the 2020 Erovnuli Liga.

His next managerial stints were similarly short, although both at Torpedo Kutaisi and Telavi he successfully coped with survival tasks.

In April 2025, Tsetsadze was appointed at Erovnuli Liga 2 side Rustavi as head coach. He led the team to the top flight after a six-year absence.

== Honours ==
Samtredia

- Erovnuli Liga: 2016
- Georgian Super Cup: 2017
- Erovnuli Liga runners-up: 2015–16

Rustavi

- Erovnuli Liga 2: 2025
