= 2018 Georgian Cup =

Tournament details
- Country: Georgia
- Teams: 78

Final positions
- Champions: Torpedo Kutaisi
- Runners-up: Gagra

Tournament statistics
- Matches played: 77
- Goals scored: 281 (3.65 per match)

The 2018 Georgian Cup was a single elimination association football tournament which began on 16 April 2018 and ended on 25 November 2018. Chikhura Sachkhere were the defending champions of the tournament after winning the previous season's cup 4–3 in a penalty shootout over Torpedo Kutaisi.

== Format ==
For the 2018 version of the Georgian Cup, the competition was contested between 78 clubs. Matches which were level after regulation proceeded to extra time and then to penalties, when needed, to decide the winning club.

== First round ==
Thirty first round matches were played on 14–16 April 2018.

Team 1	Score	Team 2
Dinamo Sokhumi	2–6	Meshakhte
Sakartvelos Universiteti	3–5	Liakhvi Tskhinvali
Tbilisi City	7–0	Racha
Kolkhi	4–0	Imereti II
Chkherimela	0–2	Tbilisi 2016
Skuri	4–5 (a.e.t.)	Salkhino Martvili
Sairme	3–2	Mertskhali
Torpedo Kutaisi II	0–2	Iveria
Zestaponi	3–2	Dinamo Batumi II
FC Tbilisi	3–3 (a.e.t.) (4–5 p)	Samgurali II
Kojaeli	2–0	Tskhumi
Gareji	1–0	Chiatura
35-e Skola	1–4	Tori
Sarti	0–1	Gardabani
Varketili	0–1 (a.e.t.)	Gori
Zugdidi	0–2	Telavi
Zana Abasha	1–5	Mark Stars
Guria	2–1	Shevardeni 1906
Meta	1–0	Voyage
Rustavi II	1–3	Sulori
Meskheti	0–1	Khikhani
Egrisi	3–0	Spaeri
Odishi 1919	1–0	Iberia
Betlemi Keda	3–1	Matchakhela
Borjomi	1–2	Kolkheti Khobi
Hereti Tchabukiani	0–2	Imereti
Aragvi Dusheti	3–4	Algeti
Bakhmaro	0–1 (a.e.t.)	Saburtalo II
Margveti 2006	1–0	Tskhinvali
Liakhvi Achabeti	2–3 (a.e.t.)	Samegrelo

== Second round ==
Sixteen second round matches were played on 8–9 May 2018.

Team 1	Score	Team 2
Tbilisi City	5–3 (a.e.t.)	Samgurali II
Salkhino Martvili	2–5	Liakhvi Tskhinvali
Iveria	1–2	Gori
Kolkheti Khobi	1–2	Norchi Dinamo
Sulori	3–4 (a.e.t.)	Telavi
Khikhani	2–4	Meshakhte
Egrisi	0–1	Mark Stars
Zestaponi	1–3 (a.e.t.)	Gardabani
Kojaeli	3–1	Sairme
Tori	0–0 (a.e.t.) (2–4 p)	Meta
WIT Georgia II	3–1	Betlemi Keda
Margveti 2006	3–0	Kolkhi
Tbilisi 2016	5–3	Samegrelo
Guria	1–0	Saburtalo II
Gareji	1–2	Algeti
Odishi 1919	0–2 (a.e.t.)	Imereti

== Third round ==
Sixteen third round matches were played on 12–14 June 2018.

Team 1	Score	Team 2
Mark Stars	2–4	Merani Martvili
Meta	0–0 (a.e.t.) (3–2 p)	Tbilisi City
Kojaeli	0–8	Dila Gori
Meshakhte	2–3	Samtredia
Samgurali	2–2 (a.e.t.) (5–6 p)	Rustavi
Guria	1–0	Kolkheti Poti
Gori	0–2	Torpedo Kutaisi
Tbilisi 2016	0–6	Chikhura Sachkhere
WIT Georgia II	0–0 (a.e.t.) (4–2 p)	Saburtalo Tbilisi
Gagra	2–1 (a.e.t.)	Sioni
Locomotive Tbilisi	4–4 (a.e.t.) (3–5 p)	Dinamo Tbilisi
WIT Georgia	1–0	Dinamo Batumi
Liakhvi Tskhinvali	5–2	Algeti
Gardabani	3–1	Imereti
Margveti 2006	0–4	Telavi
Shukura Kobuleti	4–0	Norchi Dinamo

== Fourth round ==
Eight fourth round matches were played on 19–20 September 2018.

Team 1	Score	Team 2
WIT Georgia II	1–2	Gagra
Torpedo Kutaisi	2–0 (a.e.t.)	Rustavi
Gardabani	0–3	Shukura Kobuleti
Merani Martvili	1–2	Dinamo Tbilisi
Guria	3–1	Samtredia
Liakhvi Tskhinvali	2–5	Meta
WIT Georgia	1–1 (a.e.t.) (3–0 p)	Chikhura Sachkhere
Telavi	1–0	Dila Gori

== Quarter–finals ==
The quarter–final matches were played on 3 and 24 October 2018.

Team 1	Score	Team 2
Meta	0–1	Gagra
Guria	0–5	Dinamo Tbilisi
WIT Georgia	0–3	Telavi
Shukura Kobuleti	1–3	Torpedo Kutaisi

== Semi–finals ==
The two semi–final matches were played on 7 November 2018.

Team 1	Score	Team 2
Gagra	1–0 (a.e.t.)	Dinamo Tbilisi
Telavi	0–1	Torpedo Kutaisi

== Final ==
The final was played on 25 November 2018 in Angisi Stadium in Batumi at 16.00.

25 November 2018
16:00

Gagra	2–2 (a.e.t.)	Torpedo Kutaisi
Spanderashvili 37'; Khabelashvili 49'	Report	Lačný 74', 90+1' (pen.)
Penalties
Kakiashvili (penalty scored); Kasrelishvili (penalty missed); T. Gaprindashvili (penalty scored); Sultanishvili (penalty missed)	2–4	(penalty scored) Kobakhidze; (penalty scored) T. Tsikaridze; (penalty scored) Gegetchkori; (penalty scored) Lačný

Angisi Stadium, Batumi
Attendance: 2,000
Referee: Giorgi Vadatchkoria

== See also ==
- 2018 Erovnuli Liga
