= 2020 Liga 3 (Georgia) =

Football season in Georgia

Liga 3
- Season: 2020
- Dates: 10 March - 12 December
- Champions: Gareji
- Promoted: Gareji
- Relegated: None
- Matches played: 90
- Goals scored: 259 (2.88 per match)
- Biggest home win: Kolkheti-1913 5-0 Meshakhte (13 November); Kolkheti-1913 5-0 Guria (27 November)
- Biggest away win: Meshakhte 0-6 Kolkheti-1913 (13 September)
- Highest scoring: Guria 4-5 Gareji (5 November)
- Longest winning run: Gareji (7)
- Longest unbeaten run: Kolkheti-1913 (11)
- Longest winless run: Meshakhte (9)
- Longest losing run: Meshakhte (7)

Тhe 2020 Liga 3 season was the fourth one under its current name and 33rd since Georgia formed independent football league system in 1990.

== Team changes ==
Five new members joined the league after the previous season. Tbilisi City and Spaeri gained promotion from Liga 4, while Guria Lanchkhuti, Kolkheti-1913 and Tskhinvali were relegated from the second division. The latter, though, having failed to meet the existing financial commitments, were expelled and replaced by Gareji Sagarejo, a third place team from the lower league.

== Review ==
The teams played opening matches of the season in early March, but as COVID was raging, all sport activities were halted. The games resumed in late July. A two-round competition concluded in December with Gareji Sagarejo winning the league. Kolkheti-1913 finished second, while Gori prevailed in a battle for the third qualifying slot. But both failed in their promotion bid following their play-off performance.

The two bottom teams were spared from relegation after some changes regarding the Liga 4 format for the next year were endorsed by Football Federation in February 2020.

== Teams and stadiums ==
Locations of Liga 3 football clubs in 2020

Clubs	Position in 2019	Location	Venue	Region
Bakhmaro	4th	Chokhatauri	Boris Paichadze stadium	Guria
Gareji	3rd in Liga 4	Sagarejo	Central stadium	Kakheti
Gori	7th	Gori	Kartli	Shida Kartli
Guria	8th in Liga 2	Lanchkhuti	Evgrapi Shevardnadze Stadium	Guria
Kolkheti	6th	Khobi	Paata Tatarashvili stadium	Samegrelo-Zemo Svaneti
Kolkheti 1913	9th in Liga 2	Poti	Fazisi	Samegrelo-Zemo Svaneti
Meshakhte	8th	Tkibuli	Temur Maghradze Stadium	Imereti
Saburtalo-2	5th	Tbilisi	Bendela	Tbilisi
Spaeri	1st in Liga 4	Tbilisi	Spaeri	Tbilisi
Tbilisi City	2nd in Liga 4	Tbilisi	Olympic Complex	Tbilisi

== League table ==
Pos	Team	Pld	W	D	L	GF	GA	GD	Pts	Promotion, qualification or relegation
1	Gareji (C, P)	18	14	1	3	33	17	+16	43	Promotion to the Erovnuli Liga 2
2	Kolkheti 1913	18	12	2	4	47	18	+29	38	Qualification for the promotion play-offs
3	Gori	18	9	5	4	22	18	+4	32	Qualification for the promotion play-offs
4	Spaeri	18	9	3	6	31	20	+11	30	
5	Guria	18	8	2	8	26	30	−4	26	
6	Kolkheti	18	5	7	6	27	24	+3	22	
7	Tbilisi City	18	6	3	9	21	23	−2	21	
8	Saburtalo-2	18	6	1	11	22	31	−9	19	
9	Bakhmaro	18	5	3	10	20	33	−13	18	
10	Meshakhte	18	1	3	14	10	45	−35	6	

Source: Soccerway
Rules for classification: 1) Points; 2) Head-to-head points; 3) Head-to-head goal difference; 4) Head-to-head goals scored; 5) Head-to-head away goals scored (only if two teams); 6) Goal difference; 7) Goals scored.
(C) Champions; (P) Promoted

== Results ==
=== Regular season ===
Home \ Away	GAR	KOL	GOR	SPA	GUR	KKH	TBC	SB2	BAK	MES
Gareji		3–1	1–1	4–3	2–0	0–1	1–0	2–0	1–0	4–0
Kolkheti 1913	2–0		2–4	1–1	5–0	2–1	2–1	4–0	3–1	5–0
Gori		0–0		1–0	2–1	1–1	1–0	2–1	2–0	1–0
Spaeri	0–1	1–2	1–0		1–2	3–2	1–1	3–2	4–0	4–1
Guria	4–5	1–4	0–0	0–2		1–0	1–0	3–1	3–3	2–1
Kolkheti	0–1	2–0	1–1	2–0	1–2		2–3	0–0	2–2	3–0
Tbilisi City	0–1	2–1	5–1	0–3	1–0	1–1		0–4	0–1	2–1
Saburtalo-2	1–2	0–3	1–0	1–3	2–1	3–4	2–0		1–0	3–1
Bakhmaro	1–2	1–4	2–0	0–1	0–3	1–1	0–5	2–0		3–1
Meshakhte	0–2	0–6	1–2	0–0	0–2	3–3	0–0	1–0	0–3	

Legend: Blue = home team win; Yellow = draw; Red = away team win.

=== Promotion play-offs ===
16 December 2020
13:30

Gori	0–0	Merani Martvili
	Report

Kartli Stadium, Gori
Attendance: 0
Referee: Goga Kikacheishvili
20 December 2020
13:00

Merani Martvili	3–1	Gori
Saghrishvili 41'; Patsatsia 47'; Tsotsonava 85' (pen.)	Report	Alimbarashvili 73'

Murtaz Khurtsilava Stadium, Martvili
Attendance: 0
Referee: Irakli Kvirikashvili

16 December 2020
13:30

WIT Georgia	1–0	Kolkheti-1913 Poti
Natchkebia 20'	Report

David Petriashvili Arena, Tbilisi
Attendance: 0
Referee: Bakur Ninua
20 December 2020
13:00

Kolkheti-1913 Poti	1–0 (a.e.t.)	WIT Georgia
Gvalia 68'	Report
Penalties
Gvalia (penalty missed); Megrelisvili (penalty missed); Mumuladze (penalty scored); Kirkitadze (penalty scored); Kashia (penalty scored)	3–4	(penalty missed) Nemsadze; (penalty scored) Zaridze; (penalty scored) Barabadze; (penalty scored) Molashvili; (penalty scored) Museliani

Poti Training Center, Poti
Attendance: 0
Referee: Giorgi Vadatchkoria
