= Giorgi Kilasonia =

Georgian footballer

Personal information
- Date of birth: 9 September 1968 (age 58)
- Place of birth: Rustavi, Georgian SSR
- Height: 1.77 m (5 ft 9 1/2 in)
- Position: Midfielder

Senior career*
Years	Team	Apps	(Gls)
1987–1995	FC Metalurgi Rustavi	194	(76)
1995–1996	FC Lokomotiv St. Petersburg	50	(22)
1996–1998	FC Dnipro Dnipropetrovsk	19	(4)
1997	→ FC Dnipro-2 Dnipropetrovsk	1	(0)
1998–1999	FC Samgurali Tskaltubo	11	(4)
1999–2000	FC Gorda Rustavi	13	(1)
2000–2001	PFC Turan Tovuz	16	(8)
2001–2002	Neftchi Baku PFC	9	(1)
2002–2003	FC Gorda Rustavi	14	(5)
2003	FC Ameri Tbilisi	10	(1)
2004	FC Rustavi	9	(1)
2004–2005	FC Sioni Bolnisi	14	(0)

International career
1995	Georgia	3	(0)
- * Club domestic league appearances and goals

Giorgi Kilasonia, also known as Gia Kilasonia (born 9 September 1968) is a retired Georgian professional football player, like his older brother, Varlam Kilasonia.
