= Giorgi Balashvili =

Georgian footballer

Personal information
- Date of birth: 7 August 1973 (age 53)
- Height: 1.74 m (5 ft 9 in)
- Position: Defender

Senior career*
| Years | Team | Apps | (Gls) |
| 1991–1992 | Kartli Goris Raioni | 41 | (3) |
| 1992–1996 | FC Dila Gori | 123 | (2) |
| 1997 | FC Angusht Nazran | 24 | (2) |
| 1998 | FC Dila Gori | 22 | (0) |
| 1998–2003 | FC Lokomotivi Tbilisi | 136 | (4) |
| 2003–2004 | FC Dila Gori | 48 | (0) |
| 2005 | FC Borjomi | 15 | (0) |
| 2006–2008 | FC Dila Gori | 34 | (0) |

International career
| 1998–1999 | Georgia | 3 | (0) |
- * Club domestic league appearances and goals

Giorgi Balashvili (Georgian: გიორგი ბალაშვილი; born 7 August 1973) is a former Georgian professional football player.

== See also ==
- Football in Georgia
- List of football clubs in Georgia
