= Kakhaber Kakashvili =

Georgian footballer

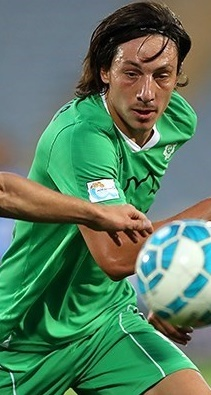
- Kakashvili playing for Machine Sazi

Personal information
- Full name: Kakhaber Kakashvili
- Date of birth: June 26, 1993 (age 33)
- Place of birth: Sokhumi, Georgia
- Position: Midfielder

Team information
- Current team: FC Rustavi
- Number: 8

Senior career*
Years	Team	Apps	(Gls)
2010–2014	Tskhinvali	34	(3)
2014–2015	Metalurgi Rustavi	26	(1)
2015–2016	Chikhura	17	(0)
2016–2017	Machine Sazi	26	(0)
2017	Gostaresh Foolad	3	(0)
2018–2019	Norchi Dinamo	3	(0)
2019	Pars Jonoubi	8	(0)
2020	Merani Tbilisi	8	(0)
2021–2022	Shukura	60	(1)
2023	FC Gagra	31	(2)
2024	FC Gareji Sagarejo	34	(2)
2025–	FC Rustavi	38	(5)
- * Club domestic league appearances and goals as of 1 September 2026

Kakhaber Kakashvili (Georgian: კახაბერ კაკაშვილი; born 26 June 1993), commonly known as Kakha, is a Georgian football forward who currently plays for FC Rustavi.
