= 2022 Liga 3 (Georgia) =

Football season in Georgia

Liga 3
- Season: 2022
- Dates: 4 April - 1 December
- Champions: Dinamo-2
- Promoted: Dinamo-2; Kolkheti 1913; Kolkheti Khobi
- Relegated: Tbilisi City
- Matches: 240
- Goals: 748 (3.12 per match)
- Biggest home win: Varketili 10-0 Chikhura (29 September)
- Biggest away win: Chikhura 0-7 Aragvi (6 October)
- Highest scoring: Varketili 10-0 Chikhura (29 September)
- Longest winning run: Dinamo-2; Kolkheti 1913 (7 matches)
- Longest unbeaten run: Kolkheti 1913 (16)
- Longest winless run: Chikhura (30)
- Longest losing run: Chikhura (15)
- All statistics correct as of 10 December.

The 2022 Liga 3 was the sixth season under its current title and the 34th season of third tier football in Georgia. The regular two-round tournament began on 4 April and ended on 1 December with promotion play-offs completed in 10 December.

== Review ==
Based on GFF decision, the number of Liga 3 clubs was increased from 14 to 16 teams for this season. In contrast with the previous year, three teams were relegated, two clubs gained automatic promotion and two more qualified for play-offs.

Both unbeaten at home, Dinamo-2 and Kolkheti 1913 sealed their promotion three rounds before the end of the season. Kolkheti Khobi joined them after the play-offs.

Chikhura continued their horrible run in this league as well. Rooted to the foot of the table with a single point in thirty games, they suffered three relegations in three successive seasons. Zestaponi, who faced financial difficulties after mid-season, also failed to stay up. Six more teams fought hard to avoid relegation. Eventually, Meshakhte, the last of the three Imeretian clubs, lost a crucial final match and ended up in the drop zone.

== Team changes ==
The following teams have changed division since the previous season:

=== To Liga 3 ===
Promoted from Liga 4

Borjomi • Dinamo-2 • Irao • Zestaponi

Relegated from Liga 2

Chikhura

=== From Liga 3 ===
Relegated to Liga 4

Magaroeli • Didube

Promoted to Liga 2

Spaeri

== Teams and Stadiums ==
Locations of Liga 3 football clubs in 2022

Six former first-tier teams were competing in Liga 3 this season, namely Borjomi (2005-09), Chikhura Sachkhere (2012-20), Guria Lanchkhuti (1990–99, 2001–02, 2013–16), Kolkheti-1913 Poti (1990-2006, 2010-2013, 2014–18), Kolkheti Khobi (1990–92, 1999–2000) and Zestaponi (2004-15).

Clubs represented in the league this season are listed below in alphabetical order:

Clubs	Position in 2021	Location	Stadium	Region
Aragvi	5th	Dusheti	OMC*	Mtskheta-Mtianeti
Bakhmaro	8th	Chokhatauri	Boris Paichadze	Guria
Borjomi	3rd in Liga 4	Borjomi	Jemal Zeinklishvili	Samtskhe-Javakheti
Chikhura	10th in Erovnuli Liga 2	Sachkhere	Centraluri	Imereti
Dinamo-2	1st in Liga 4	Tbilisi	Dinamo Academy	Tbilisi
Gori	6th	Gori	Kartli	Shida Kartli
Guria	11th	Lanchkhuti	Evgrapi Shevardnadze	Guria
Irao	4th in Liga 4	Tbilisi	Spaeri	Tbilisi
Kolkheti	9th	Khobi	Paata Tatarashvili	Samegrelo-Zemo Svaneti
Kolkheti 1913	2nd	Poti	Fazisi	Samegrelo-Zemo Svaneti
Merani-2	12th	Tbilisi	Olimpiuri Compleksi	Tbilisi
Meshakhte	10th	Tkibuli	Temur Maghradze	Imereti
Saburtalo-2	7th	Tbilisi	Bendela	Tbilisi
Tbilisi City	3rd	Tbilisi	Gldani SC*	Tbilisi
Varketili	4th	Tbilisi	Varketili SC*	Tbilisi
Zestaponi	2nd in Liga 4	Zestaponi	David Abashidze	Imereti

Note: OMC stands for Olympic Preparation Centre while SC means Football Centre.

== League table ==
Pos	Team	Pld	W	D	L	GF	GA	GD	Pts	Promotion, qualification or relegation
1	Dinamo-2 (C, P)	30	22	5	3	72	22	+50	71	Promotion to Erovnuli Liga 2
2	Kolkheti 1913 (P)	30	21	6	3	76	29	+47	69	Promotion to Erovnuli Liga 2
3	Aragvi	30	16	9	5	56	25	+31	57	Qualification for promotion play-offs
4	Kolkheti (P, O)	30	15	9	6	53	32	+21	54	Qualification for promotion play-offs
5	Varketili	30	14	9	7	65	43	+22	51	
6	Gori	30	15	5	10	58	38	+20	50	
7	Saburtalo-2	30	13	4	13	46	44	+2	43	
8	Borjomi	30	12	5	13	47	40	+7	41	
9	Irao	30	11	6	13	49	52	−3	39	
10	Bakhmaro	30	10	8	12	38	42	−4	38	
11	Tbilisi City (R)	30	11	5	14	38	48	−10	38	Resigned from the league in Winter 2023.
12	Guria	30	11	4	15	42	49	−7	37	
13	Merani-2	30	11	4	15	37	50	−13	37	
14	Meshakhte (T)	30	10	5	15	35	39	−4	35	Readmitted
15	Zestaponi (T)	30	4	3	23	18	77	−59	15	Readmitted
16	Chikhura (T)	30	0	1	29	19	119	−100	1	Readmitted

Source: gff.ge
Rules for classification: 1) Points; 2) Head-to-head points; 3) Head-to-head goal difference; 4) Head-to-head goals scored; 5) Head-to-head away goals scored (only if two teams); 6) Goal difference; 7) Goals scored.
(C) Champions; (O) Play-off winners; (P) Promoted; (R) Relegated; (T) Qualified, but not yet for the particular phase indicated

According to the existing regulations, the bottom three teams were supposed to be relegated. However, on 17 January 2023 the Football Federation announced that all of them would stay up and replace those three clubs, among them Tbilisi City, who had failed to get a Liga 3 license for the upcoming season.

== Results ==
=== Regular season ===
Home \ Away	ARA	BKH	BOR	CHI	DT2	GOR	GUR	IRA	KOL	KKH	MR2	MES	SB2	TBC	VAR	ZES
Aragvi		1–0	0–2	4–1	1–0	1–3	3–1	6–3	2–2	0–0	2–1	0–0	1–1	4–0	5–1	5–0
Bakhmaro	4–1		0–1	4–0	0–3	2–2	1–0	5–1	1–2	0–0	1–1	3–2	1–0	1–1	1–1	1–0
Borjomi	0–0	2–1		5–1	0–1	0–1	0–0	0–1	0–4	1–1	3–4	2–1	1–0	0–1	1–1	7–0
Chikhura	0–7	0–3	0–2		1–4	1–6	1–3	1–3	0–2	1–2	1–3	1–4	0–1	0–4	1–4	1–2
Dinamo-2	1–1	3–0	2–1	6–0		4–1	1–1	2–1	2–1	4–2	3–0	2–1	5–0	4–1	4–3	3–0
Gori	0–2	0–0	4–1	5–0	0–1		1–1	3–1	0–4	0–1	2–3	3–1	3–1	0–0	1–0	1–0
Guria	1–3	1–1	1–0	4–1	0–2	1–6		3–1	1–3	2–1	2–0	2–0	2–1	0–1	1–4	5–1
Irao	0–1	3–1	1–3	2–0	0–1	1–1	1–0		1–5	2–0	1–1	3–0	1–1	2–1	3–4	7–1
Kolkheti 1913	0–0	3–1	2–2	5–2	1–1	2–0	5–1	2–2		4–0	2–1	3–2	5–0	3–0	2–2	2–0
Kolkheti	0–0	1–2	3–1	4–1	2–2	3–0	3–1	4–1	2–1		1–0	0–0	1–2	6–0	3–1	2–1
Merani-2	1–2	1–2	1–4	5–0	1–0	0–3	1–0	0–1	0–2	1–1		1–0	1–3	1–0	1–4	1–0
Meshakhte	1–0	1–0	0–1	6–0	2–0	1–0	1–0	1–1	1–2	0–0	1–3		3–2	1–0	1–2	2–0
Saburtalo-2	0–1	5–0	2–1	5–3	0–2	1–3	2–0	2–0	5–1	0–1	3–0	2–0		1–1	1–3	0–0
Tbilisi City	1–0	1–1	2–1	3–0	1–3	1–4	1–4	2–0	0–2	2–5	1–2	2–0	1–2		1–0	6–0
Varketili	0–0	2–0	1–3	10–0	0–0	4–2	3–1	1–1	0–2	2–2	2–2	3–1	3–2	1–1		1–0
Zestaponi	1–3	3–1	4–2	1–1	0–6	0–3	0–3	0–4	0–2	0–2	3–0	1–1	0–1	0–2	0–2	

Legend: Blue = home team win; Yellow = draw; Red = away team win.

=== Promotion play-offs ===
First leg

6 December
13:00 UTC+4

WIT Georgia	0–0	Aragvi
	Report

Gldani Football Centre, Tbilisi
Referee: G.Avazashvili
6 December
13:00 UTC+4

Kolkheti Khobi	1–0	Rustavi
Chedia 8'	Report

Paata Tatarishvili Stadium, Khobi
Referee: G.Kikacheishvili

Second leg

10 December
13:00 UTC+4

Aragvi	0–1	WIT Georgia
	Report	Nachkebia 45'

Marakana, Tbilisi
Referee: B.Ninua
10 December
13:00 UTC+4

Rustavi	0–1	Kolkheti Khobi
	Report	Toradze 72'

Technikuri Centri, Rustavi
Referee: A.Nonikashvili

Following these matches Kolkheti Khobi achieved promotion to Erovnuli Liga 2, while Aragvi remained in Liga 3 for the next season.
