= 2023 Liga 3 (Georgia) =

Football season in Georgia

Liga 3
- Season: 2023
- Dates: 4 April – 1 December
- Champions: Aragvi
- Promoted: Aragvi; Shturmi; Rustavi
- Relegated: Merani-2; Chikhura
- Matches: 240
- Goals: 761 (3.17 per match)
- Biggest home win: Rustavi 7–0 Guria (7 November)
- Biggest away win: Chikhura 0–7 Varketili (9 May); Borjomi 0–7 Shturmi (25 October); Merani-2 0–7 Zestaponi (31 October)
- Highest scoring: Bakhmaro 8–2 Rustavi (17 October)
- Longest winning run: Shturmi (8 matches)
- Longest unbeaten run: Shturmi (13)
- Longest winless run: Chikhura (14)
- Longest losing run: Chikhura (14)
- All statistics correct as of 1 December.

The 2023 Liga 3 (Georgia) season was the 7th edition under its current title and the 35th edition of third tier football in Georgia. The regular two-round tournament began on 4 April and ended on 1 December with promotion play-offs completed on 10 December. Each team played thirty matches in as many rounds.

Gori had the longest tenure in the league with the 7th consecutive season while Meshakhte and Bakhmaro entered into the sixth year. On the other hand, three of the four new members (Locomotive-2, Rustavi and Shturmi) made their debut in Liga 3.

== Team changes ==
The following teams have changed division since the previous season:

=== To Liga 3 ===
Promoted from Liga 4

Locomotive-2 • Shturmi • Matchakhela

Relegated from Liga 2

Rustavi

=== From Liga 3 ===
Relegated to Liga 4

Tbilisi City

Promoted to Liga 2

Dinamo Tbilisi-2 • Kolkheti-1913 • Kolkheti Khobi

== Teams ==
Locations of Liga 3 football clubs in 2023

Sixteen teams were competing in Liga 3 for the 2023 season. Five of them previously played in the top division, namely Borjomi (2005–09), Chikhura (2012–20), Guria Lanchkhuti (1990–99, 2001–02, 2013–16), Rustavi (2018–19) and Zestaponi (2004–15) with the latter being the two-times national champions. There were also three reserve teams of higher league members this season.

The clubs are listed below in alphabetical order:

Clubs	Position last season	Location	Region
Aragvi^{a}	3rd	Dusheti	Mtskheta-Mtianeti
Bakhmaro	10th	Chokhatauri	Guria
Borjomi	8th	Borjomi	Samtskhe-Javakheti
Chikhura	16th	Sachkhere	Imereti
Gori	6th	Gori	Shida Kartli
Guria	11th	Lanchkhuti	Guria
Irao ^{b}	9th	Tbilisi	Tbilisi
Locomotive-2	1st in Liga 4	Tbilisi	Tbilisi
Matchakhela	3rd in Liga 4	Khelvachauri	Adjara
Merani-2 Tbilisi	13th	Tbilisi	Tbilisi
Meshakhte	14th	Tkibuli	Imereti
Rustavi	7th in Liga 2	Rustavi	Kvemo Kartli
Saburtalo-2	7th	Tbilisi	Tbilisi
Shturmi^{c}	2nd in Liga 4	Sartichala	Kvemo Kartli
Varketili	5th	Tbilisi	Tbilisi
Zestaponi	15th	Zestaponi	Imereti

^{a} Based in Tbilisi, plays at Marakana football ground.

^{b} Holds home games in Kaspi.

^{c} Uses the Sagarejo Central stadium as their home ground.

== League table ==
Pos	Team	Pld	W	D	L	GF	GA	GD	Pts	Promotion, qualification or relegation
1	Aragvi (C, P)	30	21	5	4	66	21	+45	68	Promotion to Erovnuli Liga 2
2	Shturmi (P)	30	21	5	4	67	27	+40	68	Promotion to Erovnuli Liga 2
3	Rustavi	30	19	4	7	63	31	+32	61	Qualification for promotion play-offs
4	Varketili	30	19	3	8	54	35	+19	60	Qualification for promotion play-offs
5	Meshakhte	30	15	10	5	49	24	+25	55	
6	Irao	30	15	5	10	56	41	+15	50	
7	Saburtalo-2	30	12	9	9	45	26	+19	45	
8	Gori	30	13	4	13	46	48	−2	43	
9	Guria	30	11	6	13	44	55	−11	39	
10	Locomotive-2	30	10	5	15	50	42	+8	35	
11	Borjomi	30	11	2	17	50	78	−28	35	
12	Bakhmaro	30	9	6	15	47	47	0	33	
13	Zestaponi	30	6	11	13	33	46	−13	29	
14	Matchakhela	30	8	2	20	38	81	−43	26	Relegation to Liga 4
15	Merani-2 (R)	30	4	10	16	30	58	−28	22	Relegation to Liga 4
16	Chikhura (R)	30	2	1	27	23	101	−78	7	Relegation to Liga 4

Rules for classification: 1) Points; 2) Head-to-head points; 3) Head-to-head goal difference; 4) Head-to-head goals scored; 5) Head-to-head away goals scored (only if two teams); 6) Goal difference; 7) Goals scored.
(C) Champions; (P) Promoted; (R) Relegated

== Results ==
=== Regular season ===
Home \ Away	ARA	BOR	BKH	CHI	GOR	GUR	IRA	LC2	MAT	MR2	MES	RST	SB2	STR	VAR	ZES
Aragvi		6–1	1–1	4–0	5–1	4–1	1–0	0–0	3–1	4–1	0–0	1–0	2–0	2–0	5–0	6–0
Borjomi	2–4		2–2	3–2	0–2	1–2	0–5	0–5	3–1	3–1	2–3	1–2	1–0	0–7	2–4	3–0
Bakhmaro	0–2	1–2		3–0	0–1	2–1	1–2	2–0	3–4	2–2	0–0	8–2	1–2	2–3	4–1	1–1
Chikhura	0–2	1–5	0–4		0–2	3–5	0–3	1–3	2–4	0–1	1–5	0–3	1–4	0–1	0–7	0–1
Gori	2–0	1–2	3–0	0–3		2–1	2–0	2–1	3–0	4–0	2–1	1–2	1–0	4–4	0–1	2–2
Guria	0–1	2–3	0–0	3–1	2–2		2–1	4–2	3–0	1–1	1–0	2–0	1–2	1–0	1–1	4–1
Irao	1–1	4–2	4–1	4–2	4–3	1–3		0–1	3–3	1–0	1–0	3–1	1–0	1–2	2–1	2–0
Locomotive-2	0–1	3–2	2–3	5–0	0–1	1–1	4–2		6–1	2–0	0–2	1–3	0–0	1–2	1–2	0–1
Matchakhela	1–2	2–0	0–1	1–3	3–2	3–2	0–4	0–5		2–1	2–3	0–3	1–1	0–4	0–1	3–1
Merani-2	1–5	1–1	0–3	1–1	1–0	4–0	1–1	3–3	3–2		1–2	2–2	0–0	0–1	0–1	0–7
Meshakhte	0–0	3–0	1–0	4–0	3–0	1–1	1–1	2–1	6–1	1–0		1–0	1–1	0–1	4–1	0–0
Rustavi	3–0	1–2	2–0	6–0	2–1	7–0	3–1	1–0	2–0	2–1	4–1		3–1	1–1	1–1	2–1
Saburtalo-2	0–2	4–2	1–0	5–0	4–1	6–0	2–0	1–0	4–0	1–1	0–0	0–1		2–2	0–1	2–0
Shturmi	2–0	6–2	3–1	7–1	3–0	2–0	1–2	3–0	2–0	2–1	1–1	1–0	1–1		1–0	2–1
Varketili	2–0	2–0	4–1	3–0	3–0	1–0	1–0	1–2	4–1	0–0	1–2	0–4	2–1	2–0		3–2
Zestaponi	1–2	1–3	1–0	2–1	1–1	2–0	2–2	1–1	1–2	1–1	1–1	0–0	0–0	1–2	0–0	

Legend: Blue = home team win; Yellow = draw; Red = away team win.

=== Promotion play-offs ===
5 December
18:00 GET

Locomotive	4–0	Rustavi
Makharoblidze 40' 50'; Ozbetelashvili 69' 90+3'	Report

Mikheil Meskhi reserve stadium, Tbilisi
Referee: Jenery Khorava
9 December
13:00 GET

Rustavi	4–3	Locomotive
Toroshelidze 48'; Japaridze 80'; Nakano 84', 86'	Report	Molashvili 26'; Basheleishvili 43'; Ozbetelashvili 50'

Poladi stadium, Rustavi
Referee: Irakli Kherkhadze

6 December
13:00 GET

Varketili	0–0	Kolkheti Khobi
	Report

Marakana, Tbilisi
Referee: Kote Giorgadze
10 December
13:00 GET

Kolkheti Khobi	1–0	Varketili
Tsurtsumia 90+4'	Report

Paata Tatarishvii stadium, Khobi
Referee: Badri Ninua

On 11 January 2024, the Federation announced that following the expulsion of Shukura from the 2nd division to Liga 4, Rustavi would be admitted to replace them next season with Matchakhela also spared from relegation.

== See also ==
• 2023 Erovnuli Liga

• 2023 Erovnuli Liga 2

• 2023 Liga 4

• 2023 Georgian Cup
