= Revaz Gotsiridze =

Georgian footballer (born 1981)

Revaz Gotsiridze რევაზ გოცირიძე
Personal information
- Full name: Revaz Gotsiridze
- Date of birth: 17 January 1981 (age 45)
- Place of birth: Tbilisi, Georgia
- Height: 1.85 m (6 ft 1 in)
- Position: Forward

Team information
- Current team: Kolkheti 1913 (head coach)

Youth career
- 1991–: Norchi Dinamo
- 1998–1999: Dinamo Tbilisi

Senior career*
Years	Team	Apps	(Gls)
1999–2000	WIT Georgia	25	(7)
2000–2001	TSU Tbilisi	18	(3)
2001–2002	Gorda	35	(11)
2003	SV Waldhof Mannheim	0	(0)
2003	Kryvbas Kryvyi Rih	4	(0)
2003–2004	WIT Georgia	33	(20)
2004–2006	KAMAZ Naberezhnye Chelny	40	(2)
2007	Olimpi Rustavi	13	(8)
2007–2008	Ameri	25	(10)
2008–2009	Sioni	27	(3)
2009	Spartaki Tskhinvali	15	(4)
2009–2010	Hapoel Petah Tikva	3	(0)
2010	Ahva Arraba	13	(2)
2010–2011	Sioni	16	(2)
2011–2012	Torpedo Kutaisi	40	(13)
2012–2013	Chikhura	19	(4)
2013–2014	Saburtalo	24	(4)

International career
2005–2006	Georgia	3	(0)

Managerial career
- 2015–2016: Saburtalo Tbilisi (assistant)
- 2016–2018: Saburtalo Tbilisi (youth)
- 2019–2021: Telavi
- 2022: Shukura
- 2023–2024: Locomotive
- 2025: Gonio
- 2026: Gonio
- 2026–: Kolkheti 1913
- * Club domestic league appearances and goals

Revaz Gotsiridze (Georgian: რევაზ გოცირიძე; born 17 January 1981) is a Georgian football manager and a former player, currently in charge of Erovnuli Liga 2 club Kolkheti 1913.

He is the two-time winner of Georgia's top division.

== Club career ==
Gotsiridze started playing football at the age of 10 at Norchi Dinamo. Later he joined the reserve team of Dinamo Tbilisi under Vakhtang Kopaleishvili before signing for WIT Georgia.

Gotsiridze left Georgia for Kryvbas Kryvyi Rih in April 2003, but returned for the next season. At WIT Georgia, he became the team top-scorer and scored in champions playoffs to win Umaglesi Liga in 2004. At the end of the season, he left Georgia again, this time to KAMAZ Naberezhnye Chelny of Russian First Division. In January 2007, Gotsiridze returned to the Caucasus for Olimpi Rustavi, where he won the Umaglesi Liga again.

== International career ==
Gotsiridze played twice for Georgia, including one friendly in Malta International Football Tournament 2006.

== Managerial career ==
In 2015, Gotsiridze started his managerial activities. During a two-year stint at Telavi he led the club to promotion to the top tier in 2019. Later he won Liga 2 with Shukura, but had to leave the club after some disagreements arose with the management.

In May 2023, Gotsiridze was appointed at relegation-threatened second division side Locomotive, who were sitting bottom of the table with six points after 11 games. The club stayed up in the league after a convincing play-off victory over Rustavi. Gotsiridze left the team in December 2024 as they finished in fourth place.

In June 2025, Gotsiridze took charge of Erovnuli Liga 2 club Gonio where he worked until 1 October 2025. Seven months later, he rejoined the team in the 3rd division.

On 1 September 2026, Liga 2 side Kolkheti 1913 unveiled Gotsiridze as their new head coach.

== Personal life ==
Revaz Gotsiridze has three children. He is the father of footballer Davit Gotsiridze and son-in-law of Soviet-era Dinamo Tbilisi star Ramaz Shengelia.

== Honours ==
- Umaglesi Liga: 2004, 2007
