= Varlam Kilasonia =

Soviet and Georgian footballer

Personal information
- Date of birth: 13 August 1967 (age 59)
- Height: 1.82 m (5 ft 11 1/2 in)
- Positions: Midfielder; forward

Team information
- Current team: Sioni (head coach)

Senior career*
Years	Team	Apps	(Gls)
1986	FC Metalurgi Rustavi	23	(1)
1990	FC Alazani Gurjaani	36	(9)
1991–1992	FC Kakheti Telavi	52	(36)
1992–1995	FC Metalurgi Rustavi	78	(57)
1995–1996	FC Lokomotiv St. Petersburg	55	(39)
1996–1998	FC Dnipro Dnipropetrovsk	16	(1)
1997	→ FC Dnipro-2 Dnipropetrovsk	2	(0)
1998	FC Kuban Krasnodar	9	(1)
1998–1999	FC Lokomotivi Tbilisi	6	(3)
1999–2000	FC Gorda Rustavi	34	(24)
2000–2001	PFC Turan Tovuz	13	(5)
2001–2003	FC Gorda Rustavi	8	(4)

Managerial career
- 2009–2010: Olimpi Rustavi
- 2013–2015: Olimpi Rustavi
- 2015–2016: Sioni
- 2016–2017: Rustavi
- 2018: Rustavi
- 2019–2020: Rustavi
- 2020–2021: Sioni
- 2022: Merani Martvili
- 2023–2025: Rustavi
- 2025: Sioni
- * Club domestic league appearances and goals

Varlam Kilasonia (born 13 August 1967) is a Georgian professional football manager and former player who works at Erovnuli Liga 2 club Sioni.

== Career ==
As a player, Varlam Kilasonia spent 17 years in four different countries.

He started his managerial career at Olimpi Rustavi in 2006.

Twice in a row, in 2016 and 2017, he led the newly created football club Rustavi to championship titles in the second tier, which in the second case implied automatic promotion to Erovnuli Liga.

Following three spells with this club, from July 2020 to June 2021 Kilasonia was in charge of Sioni Bolnisi, where he was named the best manager in the first phase of the season.

In late July 2022, he was announced as head coach of Merani Martvili. After his departure from this club at the end of this season, Kilasonia returned to Rustavi in February 2023. In April 2025, he was appointed by the club as Chairman of the Youth Development Programme. However, a month later he took charge of Sioni for the third spell.

== Personal life ==
His brother Giorgi Kilasonia played for the Georgia national football team.

== Honours ==
- Russian First League top scorer: 1996 (22 goals).
