= Giorgi Chelidze =

Georgian footballer (born 1986)

Georgi Chelidze გიორგი ჭელიძე
Personal information
- Full name: Georgi Nodar Chelidze
- Date of birth: 24 October 1986 (age 40)
- Place of birth: Kutaisi, Georgian SSR, Soviet Union
- Height: 1.84 m (6 ft 0 in)

Senior career*
Years	Team	Apps	(Gls)
2002–2003	FC Merani-91 Tbilisi	2	(0)
2003	FC Olimpi Tbilisi	10	(6)
2004	FC Tbilisi	19	(3)
2004–2005	FC Dinamo Batumi	16	(7)
2005–2008	FC Lokomotiv Moscow	6	(0)
2006–2007	→ FC Zorya Luhansk (loan)	13	(1)
2007–2008	→ FC Zestaponi (loan)	11	(8)
2008	FC Dinamo Batumi	7	(0)
2008–2009	PFC Neftchi	4	(0)
2009	FC Olimpi Rustavi	1	(0)
2009–2010	Samsunspor	1	(0)
2010	Sektzia Ness Ziona	10	(0)
2010–2011	Sioni Bolnisi	1	(0)

International career
2006	Georgia	1	(0)

Managerial career
- 2017: Shevardeni 1906
- 2017: Meshakhte
- 2018: Shukura
- 2019–2021: Saburtalo 2
- 2022: Telavi
- 2022: Sioni
- 2023: Samgurali
- 2024–2025: Sioni
- * Club domestic league appearances and goals

Georgi Chelidze (Georgian: გიორგი ჭელიძე; born 24 October 1986) is a Georgian professional football manager and a former player who most recently was the head coach of Georgian 2nd division club Sioni.

== Career ==
=== Player ===
Chelidze made his professional debut with Merani–91 in 2002. He spent first four seasons at different domestic clubs. In 2005, aged 18, he moved to Russia, joining FC Lokomotiv Moscow. Having mostly played for the reserves all throughout the year, Chelidze also made his debut for the first team towards the end of season, making three appearances and scoring one goal. He remained on the team for the next season, making five more sporadic appearances before going on numerous loans and eventually signing with Neftçi PFK.

In 2010, he joined Liga Leumit team Sektzia Ness Ziona in Israel.

Chelidze has made one appearance for the Georgia national football team.

=== Manager ===
Since 2016 Chelidze has been a football manager. After several years spent at Shevardeni1906, Meshakhte, Shukura and Saburtalo-2, in January 2022 he was appointed as head coach of Georgian top-tier club Telavi, where he worked for six months.

In early November 2022, he took charge of Sioni. Under his management the club won two of the three remaining matches, but still failed to stay up following the play-offs.

Chelidze took up the position of head coach at Samgurali in January in 2023. He returned to managerial role at Sioni after nearly a two-year pause in October 2024 and guided the team to another play-offs where they lost to Gagra on penalties. Chelidze left the club in May 2025 with Sioni sitting fourth in the table.
