= SFC Shturmi =

- Full name: Sartichala Football Club Shturmi
- Founded: 2020
- Ground: Sartichala Central stadium
- Capacity: 530
- Chairman: Giorgi Butskhrikidze
- Coach: Kakha Gogichaishvili
- League: Erovnuli Liga 2
- 2025: 1st of 16 in Liga 3 (promoted)
- Website: fcsshturmi.ge

SFC Sturmi (Georgian: სართიჭალის საფეხბურთო კლუბი შტურმი) is a Georgian football club based in the town of Sartichala.

Being one of the youngest domestic teams, they started taking part in the fifth division of the Georgian league system in 2020 and within four years have progressed to Erovnuli Liga 2.

== History ==
=== First steps ===
Shturmi Sartichala was formed in early 2020 to replace FC Sarti Sartichala, which dissolved in 2018. Tornike Chaduneli, the former Torpedo Kutaisi defender and Sarti manager, took charge of the team.

Shturmi had to patiently wait until their first game. Due to the COVID-19 pandemic, the season was suspended until August, when a single-round competition among 14 clubs of Group D East began.

The club from the very outset displayed an attacking style of football which greatly contributed to thrashing some rivals. In their first historic game held on 20 August 2020, Shrurmi cruised to 7–0 victory over Hereti. By mid-season, Shturmi had won five of their first seven matches, reaching a 31:5 aggregate goal difference.

In mid-October, the team was placed in a two-week COVID-19 quarantine. Straight after the games resumed, Shturmi set their own record by winning 12–0. Until the final game week the club kept beating all other opponents, although so did Dinamo-2 Tbilisi who, apart from the same winning run, had a better goal advantage. The decisive tie was supposed to determine a winner of the league group with promotion to Liga 4.

The match on 20 December 2020 in Sartichala drew a great interest among the cheering locals who, unable to get inside the ground, gathered around it. Shturmi took the lead after ten minutes with Dinamo equalizing five minutes later. Numerous attempts to break the well-defending rivals reached a dramatic end in stoppage time when the hosts were awarded a penalty kick. However, goalkeeper Omar Migineishvili saved it and with final score 1–1 Shturmi were denied victory.

In late January 2021, the Georgian Football Federation decided to enlarge Liga 4 at the expense of all four second-placed Regionuli Liga clubs from the previous season with Shturmi being among these promoted teams.

=== More promotions ===
The start in the fourth tier was less impressive. However, the team drastically improved in the second stage, won ten games, including with 7–0 and 9–0, and prevailed in a final match of the season with a 12–0 victory.

During the 2022 season, Shturmi turned out the only team in the top four Georgian leagues with the perfect home record. This circumstance played a crucial role in successful conclusion of their league campaign. With head coach Tornike Chaduneli back at the helm, Shturmi advanced to Liga 3.

From the first games there, the team proved to be a title challenger. With a 13-game unbeaten run and an eight-game winning streak during this season, Shturmi took the 3rd league by storm. Had they not dropped two points on the last matchday, the club would have become champions. Yet, they came 2nd on a goal difference and achieved another huge success by winning another promotion in their history.

Shturmi were unable to extend their tenure in the 2nd tier to another year. After conceding an extra-time last-gasp goal in the play-offs at Merani Martvili, they suffered relegation to Liga 3. However, in 2025 the team returned to their winning ways and after topping the league table achieved an immediate promotion back to Liga 2.

== Seasons ==
Year	League	Pos	M	W	D	L	GF–GA	Pts	Georgian Cup
2020	Regionuli Liga D Group	2nd of 14↑	13	12	1	0	62-7	40	
2021	Liga 4 White Group	8th of 10	18	5	2	11	29-37	17	2nd Round
2021	Relegation Round	3rd of 10	18	10	3	5	61-21	33	2nd Round
2022	Liga 4	2nd of 16↑	30	21	4	5	72-24	67	1st Round
2023	Liga 3	2nd of 16↑	30	21	5	4	67-27	68	1st Round
2024	Liga 2	8th of 10↓ (Note: Lost 2–1 on aggregate to Liga 3 side Merani Martvili)	30	12	9	15	42-49	45	3rd Round
2025	Liga 3	1st of 16↑	30	21	7	2	68-22	70	Round of 16

== Players ==
As of 18 March 2026

Note: Flags indicate national team as defined under FIFA eligibility rules; some limited exceptions apply. Players may hold more than one non-FIFA nationality.

No.	Pos.	Nation	Player
1	GK	GEO	Lasha Gurgenidze
2	MF	GEO	Giorgi Talakhadze
3	DF	GEO	Giorgi Latsabidze
4	DF	GEO	Zurab Lataria
7	FW	GEO	Giorgi Peradze
8	MF	GEO	Giorgi Khmaladze
9	FW	GEO	Lasha Butskhrikidze
10	MF	GEO	Giorgi Omarashvili
11	FW	GEO	Temur Gabunia
12	DF	GEO	Bachana Mosashvili
14	DF	GEO	Luka Berozashvili
15	DF	GEO	Vasil Khositashvili
16	GK	GEO	Saba Samkharadze

No.	Pos.	Nation	Player
17	MF	GEO	Giorgi Vekua
18	FW	UKR	Nikita Slavitskiy
21	MF	GEO	Luka Bubuteishvili
20	FW	GEO	Luka Gogitadze
22	MF	GEO	Irakli Lekvtadze
23	MF	GEO	Nikoloz Talakhadze
24	DF	GEO	Luka Kemoklidze
25	GK	GEO	Mamia Tabeshadze
27	MF	GEO	Nikoloz Kvelashvili
28	DF	GEO	Zurab Sekhniashvili (C)
33	MF	GEO	Duta Kardava
40	DF	GEO	Luka Nozadze

== Honours ==
• Regionuli Liga

Runners-up (1): 2020

• Liga 4

Runners-up (1): 2022

• Liga 3

Champions (1): 2025

Runners-up (1): 2023

== Stadium ==
Shturmi play home matches at Central stadium in Sartichala, which underwent major reconstruction works announced in January 2021. A 530-seater stadium was officially opened in late January 2024. For this reason the team hosted all their Liga 4 and Liga 3 rivals at Sagarejo's football ground.

== Name ==
SFC stands for Sartichala Football Club while Georgian word shturmi can be translated as assault.
