= Kartli Stadium =

Multi-use stadium in Gori, Georgia

Coordinates: 42°00′29.23″N 44°06′16.44″E

Kartli Stadium ქართლის სტადიონი
- Interactive map of Kartli Stadium ქართლის სტადიონი
- Owner: Government of Georgia
- Capacity: 1,500
- Surface: Grass
- Scoreboard: No
- Field size: 105 m × 68 m (344 ft × 223 ft)

Tenant
- FC Gori

The Kartli Stadium (ქართლი) is a multi-use stadium in Gori, Georgia. It is used mostly for football matches and is the home stadium of FC Gori. Two other clubs, Tskhinvali and Liakhvi, used to be its tenants as well. The stadium is able to hold 1,500 people.

== See also ==
- Stadiums in Georgia
