= FC Rustavi =

Association football club based in Rustavi, Georgia

Rustavi
- Full name: Football Club Rustavi
- Founded: 2015; 11 years ago
- Ground: Technical Centre, Rustavi
- Capacity: 1,000
- Chairman: Zurab Tsikhashvili
- Manager: Bachana Tskhadadze
- Coach: Giorgi Tsetsadze
- League: Erovnuli Liga
- 2025: 1st of 10 in Liga 2 (promoted)
- Website: fc-rustavi.ge
Home colours	Away colours

FC Rustavi (Georgian: საფეხბურთო კლუბი რუსთავი) is a Georgian football club based in the city of Rustavi. Following the 2025 season, they were promoted to the top tier of Georgian football.

Founded in 2015, it is one of the youngest participants of the Georgian football leagues.

The team has spent two seasons in the top division.

== History ==
FC Rustavi have no legal connections with any of the football clubs previously existing in the city (Gorda, Metalurgi, Olimpi). As a new team, it was established on 3 July 2015.

Rustavi debuted in the second division the same year and achieved a modest goal of retaining a place in it by finishing in midtable.

Contrary to expectations, in 2016 they emerged among the favourites, managed to prevail in the promotion contest and under manager Varlam Kilasonia won the league. However, due to the season being transitional to the spring-autumn system, no team was promoted.

Despite a poor start in 2017, the club drastically improved and after a ten-match winning run claimed the first place with automatic promotion to the first tier.

Rustavi signed some experienced players such as Nukri Revishvili, Mamuka Kobakhidze and Otar Martsvaladze and in the very first game in the Erovnuli Liga obtained three points at Dinamo Tbilisi. But frequent changes of the squad throughout the season did not contribute to stable results and finally the team finished in the 7th place.

The club was struggling for most of the regular season in 2019. Eventually, Rustavi could have remained in the league in case of a play-off victory over Telavi, but they were defeated in both games.

Back in Liga 2, the next season Rustavi joined the promotion battle and remained in a play-off range until the last game. However, the results of the final matchday turned out unfavourable. Yet, in this season Rustavi recorded their biggest win 10–0.

Starting from 2021, the club took part in two relegation battles. Initially, Rustavi prevailed over Kolkheti 1913 due to away goals, but in the next season they lost both matches to Kolkheti Khobi, which resulted in their relegation to the third division.

During the 2023 season, Rustavi were battling for an automatic promotion spot. Although the team suffered a 7–4 aggregate defeat from Locomotive in play-offs, ultimately they were admitted back to the 2nd division after Shukura's disqualification by the Federation.

In 2024, Rustavi finished 3rd, implying taking part in promotion playoffs, but they lost to Telavi again. A year later, though, the team managed to win the Liga 2 season despite trailing by ten points in mid-season and return to the top tier after a six-year absence.

Rustavi have three times reached the quarterfinal stage of the Georgian Cup competition. As a lower league side, they came close to reaching the semifinals during the game against Dinamo Tbilisi in 2017. After a goalless draw in regular and extra times, the winner of the quarterfinal was determined on penalties. The same scenario unfolded two years later when Rustavi's Cup campaign was stopped by Torpedo Kutaisi.

== Seasons ==
Season	League	Pos	P	W	D	L	GF	GA	Pts	Domestic Cup
2015/16	2nd	9_{/18}	34	10	13	11	33	33	43	1st round
2016	2nd	1_{/9}	16	12	2	2	40	15	32 (Note: Six points deducted)	Preliminary round
2017	2nd	1_{/10}↑	36	26	5	5	72	25	83	1/4 finals
2018	1st	7_{/10}	36	8	13	15	33	44	37	1/8 finals
2019	1st	8_{/10}↓ (Note: Lost 3–1 on aggregate to Telavi in Liga 1/2 play-offs)	36	9	11	16	40	56	38	1/4 finals
2020	2nd	4_{/10}	18	7	5	6	35	27	26	1/16 finals
2021	2nd	9_{/10} (Note: Beat Kolkheti 1913 on away goles in Liga 2/3 play-offs)	36	11	6	19	46	58	39	1/16 finals
2022	2nd	7_{/10}↓ (Note: Lost 2–0 on aggregate to Kolkheti Khobi in Liga 2/3 play-offs)	28	6	5	17	34	54	23	1/8 finals
2023	3rd	3_{/16}↑ (Note: Promoted despite losing 7–4 on aggregate to Locomotive in Liga 2/3 play-offs)	30	19	4	7	63	31	61	1st round
2024	2nd	2_{/10} (Note: Lost 3–2 on aggregate to Telavi in Liga 1/2 play-offs)	36	20	5	11	62	41	65	1/8 finals
2025	2nd	1_{/10}↑	36	21	8	7	62	30	71	1/4 finals

== Top goalscorers ==
Season	Div.	Name	Goals
2015–16	2nd	(Georgia (country)) Zviad Metreveli, Zaza Tsitskishvili	6
2016	2nd	(Georgia (country)) Data Sitchinava	12
2017	2nd	(Georgia (country)) Data Sitchinava	30
2018	1st	(Georgia (country)) Beka Kavtaradze, Zaza Tsitskishvili, Otar Martsvaladze	4
2019	1st	(Georgia (country)) Beka Kavtaradze	8
2020	2nd	(Georgia (country)) Toma Tabatadze	13
2021	2nd	(Georgia (country)) Paata Kiteishvili	12
2022	2nd	(South Africa) Bantu Mzwakali	9
2023	3rd	(Georgia (country)) Bachuki Gotsadze	10
2024	2nd	(Georgia (country)) Giorgi Gabedava	15
2025	2nd	(Brazil) Jean	13

== Penalty shoot-outs ==
Date	Competition	Round	Opponent	Venue	Result	Score
13 September 2017	Georgian Cup	Quarterfinals	Dinamo Tbilisi	Home	Lost	0–3
25 September 2019	Georgian Cup	Quarterfinals	Torpedo Kutaisi	Home	Lost	2–4
7 August 2025	Georgian Cup	Round of 16	Iberia 1999 B	Away	Won	4–3

== Squad ==
As of 20 August 2026

Note: Flags indicate national team as defined under FIFA eligibility rules; some limited exceptions apply. Players may hold more than one non-FIFA nationality.

No.	Pos.	Nation	Player
1	GK	GEO	Soso Kardava
2	DF	GEO	Shotiko Andguladze
3	DF	GEO	Vazha Patsatsia
4	DF	BRA	David Oliveira
5	DF	ARG	Kevin Ceijas
7	MF	BRA	Jackson Kenio
8	MF	GEO	Kakhaber Kakashvili
9	FW	BRA	Jean Souza
10	FW	GHA	Prince Osei
11	FW	GHA	Solomon Kessi
12	DF	GEO	Tsotne Tarkashvili
13	MF	GEO	Avtandil Gujabidze (C)
18	MF	GEO	Nika Japaridze

No.	Pos.	Nation	Player
19	DF	GEO	Nikoloz Chikovani
20	FW	GEO	Luka Parkadze
21	GK	GEO	Papuna Beruashvili
22	MF	JPN	Yuta Nakano
23	MF	SVK	Martin Gamboš
24	DF	GEO	Irakli Iakobidze
27	DF	GEO	Mamuka Kapanadze
30	FW	GEO	Giorgi Chkheidze
33	MF	GEO	Giorgi Ksovreli
35	GK	GEO	Roland Jobava
40	DF	GEO	Davit Ubilava

=== Out on loan ===
Note: Flags indicate national team as defined under FIFA eligibility rules; some limited exceptions apply. Players may hold more than one non-FIFA nationality.

No.	Pos.	Nation	Player
17	MF	GHA	Billy Jibril (at FC Spaeri until 31 December 2026)

== Managers ==
Name	Nat.	From	To
Giorgi Mishvelidze	(Georgia (country))	September 2015	April 2016
Varlam Kilasonia	(Georgia (country))	April 2016	December 2017
Vladimir Gazzayev	(Russia)	January 2018	June 2018
Varlam Kilasonia (2)	(Georgia (country))	June 2018	September 2018
Ucha Sosiashvili	(Georgia (country))	September 2018	December 2018
Badri Kvaratskhelia	(Georgia (country)) (Azerbaijan)	February 2019	April 2019
Varlam Kilasonia (3)	(Georgia (country))	May 2019	July 2020
Suliko Davitashvili	(Georgia (country))	July 2020	August 2020
Temur Makharadze	(Georgia (country))	August 2020	February 2021
Vladimer Khachidze	(Georgia (country))	February 2021	July 2021
Armaz Jeladze	(Georgia (country))	August 2021	April 2022
Levan Jokhadze	(Georgia (country))	May 2022	November 2022
Valeri Abramidze	(Georgia (country))	November 2022	December 2022
Varlam Kilasonia (4)	(Georgia (country))	February 2023	April 2025
Giorgi Tsetsadze	(Georgia (country))	April 2025	

== Club staff ==
Position	Name
General Director	Bachana Tskhadadze
Head coach	Giorgi Tsetsadze
Assistant coach	
Goalkeeper coach	Andro Koroshinadze

== Honours ==
- Pirveli Liga/Erovnuli Liga 2
  - Champions (3): 2016 (Group White), 2017, 2025
  - Runners-up (1): 2024
- Liga 3
  - Third (1): 2023

== Notable players ==
- Giorgi Mamardashvili
- Khvicha Kvaratskhelia

== Other teams ==
Rustavi also have a reserve team, which participates in Group A of Regionuli Liga. Their home ground is the Poladi stadium.
