= FC Khikhani Khulo =

- Founded: 2015
- Dissolved: 2021
- Ground: Khulo, Georgia
- Capacity: 400
- League: N/A

FC Khikhani Khulo (Georgian: საფეხბურთო კლუბი ხიხანი) is a defunct Georgian association football club from the town of Khulo.

The team took part in Meore Liga and Regionuli Liga for six seasons combined. In 2021, they withdrew from the league.

== History ==
Khikhani was founded in 2015 with financial support from the Acharistskali Georgia power company, engaged in HEP construction nearby. The team made a debut in Meore Liga in the same year and finished in the 4th place.

Due to reorganization of the Georgian league structure, the next season 56 clubs out of 64 were relegated from the league. Among them was Khikhani, despite coming 3rd in their group.

The club became a member of Regionuli Liga, where they spent next four seasons. Following the first year, when Khikhani achieved their main goal, in 2018 the team faced worsening financial problems.

In March 2021, Khikhani played their last matches both in the Cup and league tournaments and suspended their activities.

== Seasons ==
Season	League	Pos	M	W	D	L	GF–GA	Pts
2015-16	Meore Liga West	4th of 14	26	16	3	7	71-28	51
2016	Meore Liga West С	3rd of 7↓	12	8	0	4	28-16	24
2017	Regionuli Liga West А	6th of 15	28	13	8	7	54-33	47
2018	Regionuli Liga West	8th of 8	14	1	3	10	12-39	6
2019	Regionuli Liga West	6th of 11	10	5	0	5	25-20	15
2020	Regionuli Liga West B	5th of 6	10	2	1	7	10-24	7

== Name ==
The club was named after the medieval Khikhani (Khirkhati) castle, located in 45 km from municipal centre Khulo.
