= Sartichala =

Sartichala სართიჭალა
- Location within Georgia
- Coordinates: 41°42′50″N 45°10′21″E
- Country: Georgia (country)
- Region: Kvemo Kartli
- Municipality: Gardabani Municipality
- Elevation: 680 m (2,230 ft)

Population (2014 Census)
  - Total: 6,009 ▼
- Time zone: UTC+4 (Georgian Time)

Sartichala (Georgian: სართიჭალა [saɾtʰitʃʼala]) is a village situated in Kvemo Kartli, Eastern Georgia, and is part of the Gardabani Municipality. According to the 2002 population census of Georgia the population of the village amounted to 7041 persons, making it the 5th largest village in the country.

== History ==
Sartichala as a settlement is first recorded in 1578, by Vakhushti and Ioane Batonishvili. At that time, the village used to be called Satischala (Georgian: სათისჭალა [sɑtistʃʼɑlɑ]).

On September 21, 1818 the first German settlement in the South Caucasus, Marienfeld (near Tbilisi, along the Kakheti highway, now part of Sartichala), was established by a group of Swabian Germans.

Within the next year five more colonies were established, one of them being Petersdorf near Marienfeld which is now part of Sartichala.

From October 1941 to April 1942, most of Georgia's German families, in total 19,186 people, were deported by the Soviet authorities from the republic.

The estimated number of churches in the village is 5:

- Church of Saint Lazarus (Georgian: წმინდა ლაზარეს ტაძარი)
- Church of the Assumption of the Virgin (Georgian: ღვთისმშობლის მიძინების ეკლესია)
- Church of the Archangels (Georgian: მთავარანგელოზთა ტაძარი)
- The Church of Saint Nicholas (Georgian: წმინდა ნიკოლოზის ტაძარი)
- Church of the Holy Trinity (Georgian: სამების ეკლესია)

== Geography ==
Sartichala is situated along the west bank of the Iori (river), atop the Iori Plateau, and lies at an elevation of 680 meters above sea level. The village is located approximately 34 kilometers east of Georgia's capital, Tbilisi and has the population of 6,009 (2014 census).

The Sartichala oil production plant began working in July 1998, turning out naphtha, diesel and fuel oil. Later on, the Sartichala area of Samgori South Dome oil field was depleted and unfortunately no fields of such scale have been discovered since.

== Education ==
Sartichala is home to several institutions of primary and secondary education:

- LEPL - Village Sartichala Public School No.1

Students: 414

Teachers: 38

- LEPL - Village Sartichala Public School No.2

Students: 544

Teachers: 57

- LEPL - Village Sartichala Public School No.3

Students: 320

Teachers: 32

The total number of school students in the village is approximately 1,278 and there are 127 teachers on duty.

== Famous People ==
- Guram Gedekhauri (Greco Roman wrestling).
- Beka Bitsadze (Georgia national rugby union team).
