= Football in Georgia (country) =

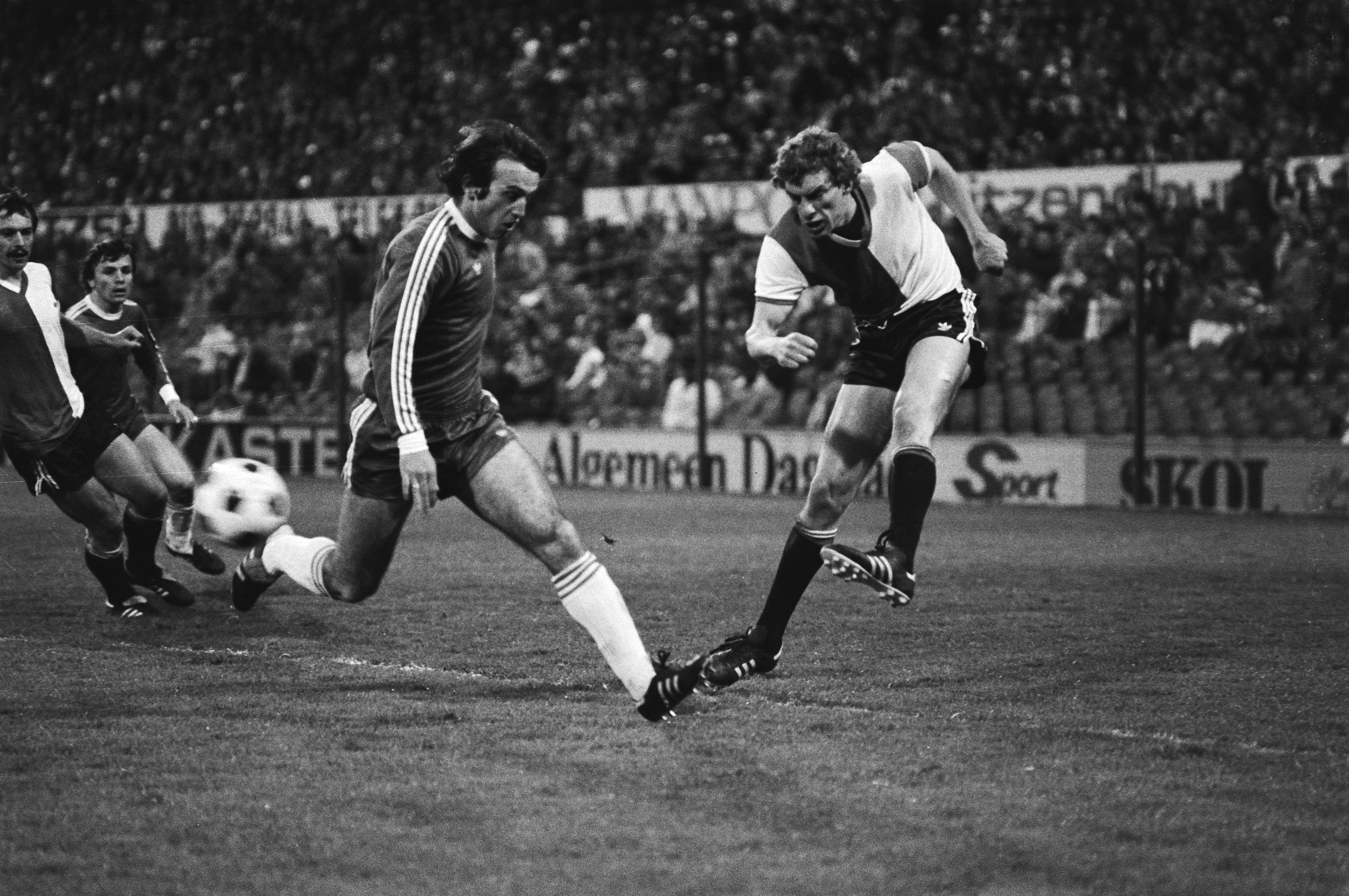
- Dinamo Tbilisi playing against Feyenoord, 1981
- Country: Georgia
- Governing body: Georgian Football Federation (GFF)
- National team: Georgia

National competitions
- Georgian Cup

Club competitions
- Erovnuli Liga; Erovnuli Liga 2 Liga 3 Liga 4 Regionuli Liga

International competitions
- Champions League; Europa League; Europa Conference League; Super Cup; FIFA Club World Cup; FIFA World Cup (national team); European Championship (national team); UEFA Nations League (national team)

Football is the most popular sport in Georgia. It is governed by the Georgian Football Federation (GFF). Approximately 30% of the Georgian people are interested in football The GFF organises the men's, women's, and futsal national teams.

Georgian Football Federation was established in 1936 and remained a member of the USSR Football Federation from then until 1989. Following the dissolution of the Soviet Union, the Football Federation of Independent Georgia was founded on February 15, 1990. It is believed that modern Georgian football was introduced by English sailors who played in Poti at the beginning of the 20th century.

== History ==
=== Early origins ===
Football was introduced to Georgia in the late 19th century, with initial activities in both western Georgia, particularly in the coastal ports of the Black Sea, and in Tbilisi. Tbilisi became the main hub for the sport's development. According to a report from Tbilisi's First Boys' Gymnasium in 1896, the school had all the necessary equipment for football alongside gymnastics. This was largely due to Czech gymnastics teacher Bogdan Petuchek, who was well-versed in football. In 1896, Anton Lukesh, a prominent member of the Czech gymnastic society "Sokol", was brought from the Czech Republic to enhance the gymnastics program at the gymnasium. By 1898, Lukesh had formed a circle of gymnastics enthusiasts who also practiced athletics and presumably football.

Although the people of Tbilisi had a basic understanding of football, it wasn't until 1906 that any organized interest in the sport emerged. Prior to this, members of the gymnastic society "Sokol" occasionally engaged with the sport, treating it as entertainment or experimentation by kicking the ball and competing in high kicks.

In 1906, the first football team in Tbilisi was formed under the leadership of Adolf Elsinger, a member of the presidium of "Sokol" Tbilisi. Initially, football was played casually, often during excursions by the gymnasts. For example, on May 28, 1906, eleven members of "Sokol" and one guest organized an excursion near Lisi Lake. They engaged in various activities such as wrestling, jumping, javelin shooting, shot put and swimming. This event is documented in the 1906 report of "Sokol" Tbilisi: "We played two games of football and returned to Tbilisi by 4 o'clock in the afternoon."

Tbilisi correspondent P. Losovsky wrote about football: "Until 1906, football was little known in Tbilisi. Only active members of the local gymnastic community would play one or two games outside the city during the summer holidays, but they did not have an organized team." In June 1906, at the Tbilisi Velodrome, located on the grounds of what is now the Marjanishvili Theatre, N. Lgotak formed the first, albeit unofficial, small circle of football players. M. Homer was elected as the team leader and captain.

The team adopted white canvas trousers, black shirts resembling tunics, and thick, sleeveless yellow tops as their sports uniforms, which restricted movement. Despite these limitations, they made do with what they had. Members of the football circle paid a monthly fee of one ruble. Due to the summer heat, games were organized twice a week, often played under electric lights from 9 pm.

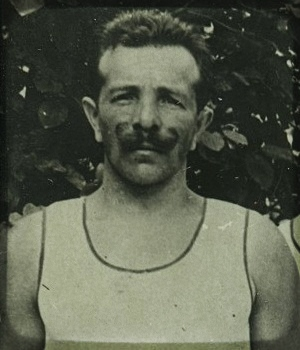
Adolf Elsinger

After Homer's death, Adolf Elsinger, a member of the Tbilisi gymnastic society "Sokol," took over leadership. He translated the rules of football from English, helping to further organize and formalize the sport in Tbilisi.

By January 1, 1907, the football amateur circle in Tbilisi had 18 members and 5 attendees. However, the authorities demanded the official registration of the circle, threatening to forbid not only their football games but even their gatherings if they failed to comply.

A document found in the National Archive provides accurate and interesting information about the formation of the first official football team in Tbilisi. This document belongs to the General Department of the Chancellery of the Governor of Tbilisi and is titled "College Assessor A. A. Elsinger and Other Persons' Petition on the Establishment of the Circle of Football Fans in Tbilisi." The correspondence within this case began in late 1906 and concluded in 1907.

From this document, it is evident that the organizers of the football circle in Tbilisi applied to the government of the Tbilisi governorate, seeking permission to create an official football team.

According to current data, manganese began to be exported from Georgia in 1879, and this year is considered the approximate birth date of Georgian football. It remains unclear which ship first arrived at Poti port or which foreign player first kicked a ball on Georgian soil. The renowned sports journalist Otar Gagua has described this presumed episode as follows:

"Let's imagine such a scene: an English ship is docked in Poti Harbor. It will have to stay for an extended period—no one knows how many days it will take to load the manganese. To pass the time, the sailors kick a ball around in a nearby meadow, attracting the attention of local boys. The game they play is entirely unfamiliar to the people of Poti. Gradually, the locals begin to understand the essence of the game: two groups, divided into teams, try to score by hitting a pile of stones at the end of the meadow with the ball. Today, we easily recognize this as 'football,' but at that time, this leather sphere, filled with air in an unknown way, caused strange associations. It was quite different from the traditional Georgian game of Lelo."

Grigol Khorava, a veteran footballer from Poti, recalls one of the first football matches in Georgia as follows:

"On that day, the teams from the deck and the motor division competed against each other. The deck team was led by the ship's captain, while the motor division was headed by a senior mechanic. The game was frequently interrupted as the players argued. Eventually, the motor division won. The captain, angry at the senior mechanic, challenged him to a boxing match and knocked him down with a powerful punch. We thought they were fighting for real, but afterward, they shook hands and carried on as if nothing had happened, continuing their voyage together on the ship."

In 1906, Niko Nikoladze's son, Giorgi Nikoladze, gathered the first team of football players Poti. Two years later, this team was officially founded under the leadership of Oscar Zivert, a representative of the English manganese concession and a former player. Zivert served as both the patron and captain of the team.

Initially, the people of Poti often faced defeat, but they persisted in their pursuit of progress. Among the early pioneers of Georgian football were: Alexander Kacharava, Victor Kurua, Vyacheslav Obianski, Vanichka Didia, Vladimir Paichadze, Ruben Alkhazov, Shura Kavtaradze, Vanichka Kvachadze, and others, including two Italians.

Oscar Zivert, due to a knee injury, could no longer play full-time and transitioned into coaching, while his son Edouard took over as team captain. Following this change, the people of Poti frequently triumphed over the English teams, often taking the defeated team's uniform as a trophy. New additions to the team included Lado Gabunia, Gogi Goginava, goalkeeper Shaliko Darchia, Efrem Laitadze, Petya Lukyanov, Shalva Paichadze, Grigol Ghoghoberidze, Iona Kurua, Valodia Tsomaia, and Grigol Khorava.

In 1922, Vano Mikadze from Sokhumi joined them. The team, which was named "Unita", was captained by Kolya Goginava. Then the teams of "Uranus", "Remedas", Poti I and II appeared. Eduard Nikolaishvili, Tsagu Chitanava, Misha Antadze, Akaki Zhgenti, Valodia Shubladze, Misha Zemlitsky, Vasiko Shubladze, Sasha Alimonaki, Giga Lezhava, Grisha Imnadze, Andro Gabunia, Valia Paichadze played in "Urani". As part of the II team: Dusha Vekua, Mitro Asatiani, Panai Kurchidi, Kako Apkhazava, Kote Gunia, Fedya Seropinas, Fanti Kvantaliani, Maqa Khorava and others. The I Team was almost entirely composed of "Unita" reinforced by Jarji Nikolaishvili.

Then came the generation of Boris Paichadze, who learned to play football during their childhood on the so-called "Chkhartishvili Field." Kako Imnadze, a representative of this generation, reminisces about that period:

In my childhood, you would see ships from all countries of the world in Poti port. They would load and unload Georgian manganese directly onto their ships. This often kept them anchored for months. Most frequently, English ships arrived, but there were also French, Italians, and Greeks. Near the port, English sailors set up a stadium where they played football daily in their spare time. I remember that stadium well; it had excellent drainage, so even after heavy rains, there would be no puddles on the field. Gradually, we learned to play football from them. Balls were hard to come by then, so my friends—Grisha Gagua, Vanichka Kintsureishvili, Sasha Eliava, Kako Kalichava, Albert Komakhiani, Gvachi Jorbenadze, and Boria Paichadze—would go to the slaughterhouse to retrieve a cow or buffalo bladder to make a ball. Once we had the bladder, we would take it to an old footballer, Dusha Vekua, who would prepare it for us. Sometimes we played among ourselves, and other times against the English. Crowds of spectators would gather around the square; it was always packed. Poti was a small town then, but the games never lacked an audience. We were young and shared a passion when we played football on that splendid field. As we grew up, the elders bought us uniforms and gave us encouragement. Almost all of us ended up wearing FC Dinamo Tbilisi shirts.

Told by one of the first Georgian football players, Ivane (Ghogho) Khoperia:

"Before the war, we often played football with music accompaniment. Kako Zhgenti, an old footballer, fashioned his boots with small iron plates and used crushed bamboo stems for shin protection, yet injuries were rare. The area where the mill now stands near the port was our playground. I remember seeing the elders in their English football uniforms. Losing a match meant great shame; they would ceremoniously hand over their uniforms, sometimes tossing them in a wooden box into the sea if the English ships departed, while ours often washed it ashore. I don't recall the English ever speaking harshly; they always made a gentleman's promise to the loser. When the war broke out, I volunteered and was captured near Kharkiv. After the war, I found myself in Holland and France, where I no longer played football. Later, I played in Estonia, and in 1946, Andro Zhordania brought me back. Then I injured my meniscus, and from 1948, I led Kolkhida for 23 years. During tough times for the team, I'd bring food and drinks from home. Once, I even brought my own refrigerator for a referee. Anyone who remembers would agree: no one in Poti was a bigger football fan than my mother — she even accompanied us to away games."

=== Tbilisi Championship ===
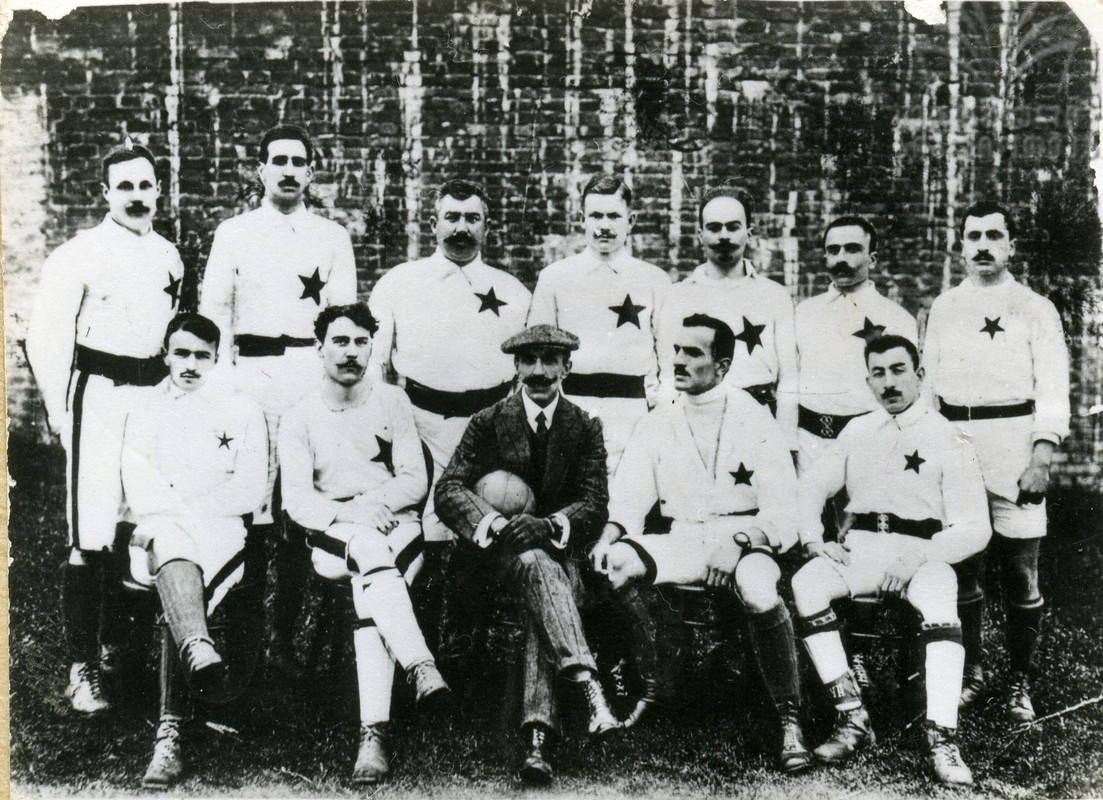
First Georgian Football Club "Kometa"

Football quickly spread from the seaside to various parts of Georgia, with Tbilisi emerging as its central hub. In 1906, the first football circle in Tbilisi, was established under the leadership of Adolf Elsinger, a member of the gymnastics society "Sokol," who also translated football rules from English. Initially, matches were sporadic, often occurring during gymnastic excursions. However, by 1907, the "Kometa" football team was officially recognized by the Tbilisi governorate, although finding opponents was initially challenging.

By 1908–09, football teams began forming in Tbilisi schools, leading to the first official showcase in Georgia on October 22, 1909, between teams from Tbilisi's I and II gymnasiums during an excursion to Kutaisi. The early 1910s saw the establishment of the Tbilisi championship, won by the I gymnasium in 1912, marking a significant expansion of football across Sokhumi, Kutaisi, Batumi, and Poti.

During World War I, football in Georgia thrived, with numerous teams operating independently. However, the lack of a unified organization prevented Georgia from joining FIFA. Despite this, friendly matches laid the groundwork for city championships, often held at locations like Didube and the Hippodrome, which later became the site of the modern "Dinamo" Stadium.

The first international friendly match in Georgian football history took place in 1912 on what is now Mikheil Tsinamdzgvrishvili Street, between Tbilisi's "Sokol" and Baku's "British Club", ending in a 5–4 victory for Baku. Post-Sovietization, Tbilisi saw the formation of several football clubs, including "Dinamo", "Arsenal" and "Amirani" among others.

In 1923, Tbilisi hosted its first championship with 27 participating teams. By 1926, the Tbilisi championship expanded to include teams across three categories.

== Domestic competition ==
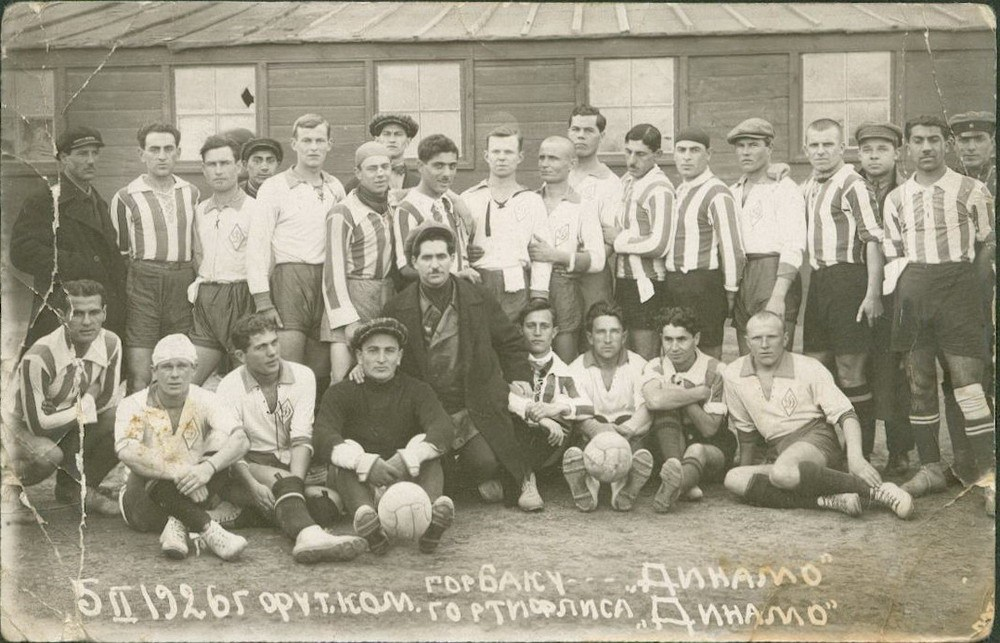
Dinamo (Baku) & Dinamo Tbilisi

Home football competitions in Georgia are organized by the Georgian Football Federation. The top-tier competition is the Erovnuli Liga, followed by the Erovnuli Liga 2, Liga 3, Liga 4. The Tbilisi Football Federation is in charge of the Regionuli Liga groups comprising the teams from eastern Georgia while the Imereti Football Federation organizes the tournament for western clubs.

In addition to these championships, Georgia also hosts the Georgian Cup and the Georgian Super Cup.

Level	League(s)/Division(s)
1	Erovnuli Liga; 10 clubs
	↓ 1–3 clubs
2	Erovnuli Liga 2; 10 clubs
	↑ 1–3 clubs ↓2–4 clubs
3	Liga 3; 16 clubs
	↑2–4 clubs ↓3 clubs
4	Liga 4; 16 clubs
	↑3 clubs ↓ 4 clubs
5	Regionuli Liga; 39 teams divided in 3 groups of 11 in 1 group and 14 in 2 groups
6	Regionuli Leagues

== Stadiums in Georgia ==
#	Stadium	Capacity	City	Home team	Opened
1	Boris Paichadze Dinamo Arena	54,549	Tbilisi	FC Dinamo Tbilisi	1976
2	Mikheil Meskhi Stadium	27,670	Tbilisi	FC Locomotive Tbilisi	1952
3	Batumi Stadium (Adjarabet Arena)	20,000	Batumi	FC Dinamo Batumi	2020
4	Ramaz Shengelia Stadium	14,700	Kutaisi	FC Torpedo Kutaisi	1956
5	Givi Chokheli Stadium	12,000	Telavi	FC Telavi	
6	Temur Maghradze Stadium	11,650	Chiatura	FC Magaroeli	1964
7	Vladimer Bochorishvili Stadium	6,000	Tkibuli	FC Meshakhte	1968
8	Tengiz Burjanadze Stadium	5,000	Gori	FC Dila	
9	Poladi Stadium	4,657	Rustavi	FC Rustavi	1948
10	David Abashidze Stadium	4,558	Zestaponi	FC Zestaponi	1952
11	Evgrapi Shevardnadze Stadium	4,500	Lanchkhuti	FC Guria	

== Most successful clubs overall ==
As of 1 July 2026

Club	Domestic Titles					International Titles	Total titles
Club	League Georgia & USSR	Cup Georgia & USSR	Georgian Super Cup	CIS Cup	Total	UEFA Cup Winners' Cup	Total titles
Dinamo Tbilisi	21	15	9	1	46	1	47
Torpedo Kutaisi	4	5	4	-	13	-	13
Iberia 1999	3	3	1	-	7	-	7
Dinamo Batumi	2	1	2	-	5	-	5
Zestaponi	2	1	2	-	5	-	5
WIT Georgia	2	1	1	-	4	-	4
Dila Gori	1	2	1	-	4	-	4
Ameri Tbilisi	-	2	2	-	4	-	4
Metalurgi Rustavi	2	-	1	-	3	-	3
Locomotive Tbilisi	-	3	-	-	3	-	3
Samtredia	1	-	1	-	2	-	2
Gagra	-	2	-	-	2	-	2
Chikhura Sachkhere	-	1	1	-	2	-	2
Sioni Bolnisi	1	-	-	-	1	-	1
Guria Lanchkhuti	-	1	-	-	1	-	1
Spaeri	-	1	-	-	1	-	1

== Attendances ==
The average attendance per top-flight football league season and the club with the highest average attendance:

Season	League average	Best club	Best club average
2019	1,156	Dinamo Batumi	4,361
2018	826	Torpedo Kutaisi	2,178
2017	1,016	Torpedo Kutaisi	2,794

== See also ==
- Tbilisi Regional League
- List of football clubs in Georgia
- Georgian Football League System
