= 2024 FC Dinamo Tbilisi season =

FC Dinamo Tbilisi
2024 season
- Chairman: Roman Pipia
- Manager: Andrés Carrasco (until 7 June); Ferdinand Feldhofer (16 June - 10 December)
- Stadium: Boris Paichadze Dinamo Arena
- Erovnuli Liga: 7th
- Georgian Cup: Runners Up vs Spaeri
- Georgian Super Cup: Runners Up
- UEFA Conference League: First qualifying round vs Mornar
- Top goalscorer: League: Two Players (6); All: Vakhtang Salia (7)

The 2024 FC Dinamo Tbilisi season is the thirty-sixth successive season that FC Dinamo Tbilisi played in the top flight of Georgian football.

== Season events ==
On 23 January, Dinamo Tbilisi announced the signing of Daniel Romanovskij to a two-year contract, from FA Šiauliai.

On 24 January, Dinamo Tbilisi announced the signing of Oscar Santis to a two-year contract, with an option of an additional year, from Antigua.

On 30 January, Dinamo Tbilisi announced the signing of Dominique Simon to a two-year contract, from Paide Linnameeskond.

On 31 January, Saba Khvadagiani left the club to sign for Maccabi Netanya.

On 4 February, Dinamo Tbilisi announced the departure of Luka Latsabidze to Shakhtar Donetsk.

On 10 February, Dinamo Tbilisi announced that Davit Skhirtladze had joined Kocaelispor on loan until the summer transfer window. Later the same day Dinamo Tbilisi announced that several plays on trial had left the club and that Nikoloz Mali had joined Dinamo Batumi.

On 11 February, Dinamo Tbilisi announced the signing of Alisher Shukurov from Kuktosh Rudaki to a two-year contract, with the option of a third.

On 12 February, Dinamo Tbilisi announced the signing of free-agent Joshua Akpudje to a two-year contract, with the option of a third, and the signing of Sunday Haruna to a two-year contract, with the option of another two, from AS Trenčín.

On 24 March, Dinamo Tbilisi announced the signing of Vasilios Gordeziani from PAOK on a contract until the end of 2026.

On 6 April, Dinamo Tbilisi announced the signing of free-agent Tornike Okriashvili on a contract until the end of the season.

On 7 June, head coach Andrés Carrasco left the club by mutual consent.

On 13 June, Dinamo Tbilisi announced that both Daniel Romanovskij and Joshua Akpudje had left the club by mutual agreement.

On 16 June, Dinamo Tbilisi announced that Giorgi Maisuradze had left the club to sign for Polissya Zhytomyr. Later the same day, Ferdinand Feldhofer was appointed as the club's new head coach on an 18-month contract.

On 3 July, Dinamo Tbilisi announced the return of Saba Khvadagiani on a year on loan from Maccabi Netanya.

On 4 July, Dinamo Tbilisi announced that Giorgi Loria had left the club.

On 30 July, Dinamo Tbilisi announced the signing of Dominik Reiter from SC Rheindorf Altach on a contract until the end of 2025. The following day, 1 August, Dinamo Tbilisi also announced the signing of Benson Anang and the return of Nika Ninua.

On 2 September, Dinamo Tbilisi announced the signing of free-agent Solomon Kvirkvelia on a contract until the end of the season.

On 5 September, Dinamo Tbilisi announced the signing of Mate Vatsadze on a contract until the end of the season from Gagra.

On 10 September, Dinamo Tbilisi announced the signing of free-agent Nosa Edokpolor.

On 29 October, Dinamo Tbilisi announced that they had agreed a deal with Newcastle United for the transfer of Vakhtang Salia in the summer of 2025 when he turns 18.

On 16 November, Dinamo Tbilisi announced the signing of free-agent Tobias Schützenauer on a contract until the end of the season.

On 10 December, Dinamo Tbilisi announced the departure of Ferdinand Feldhofer as head coach by mutual agreement.

On 18 December, Dinamo Tbilisi announced the appointment of Vladimir Kakashvili as their new head coach for the 2025 season.

== Squad ==
As of match played 8 December 2024

No.	Name	Nationality	Position	Date of birth (age)	Signed from	Signed in	Contract ends	Apps.	Goals
Goalkeepers
1	Tobias Schützenauer	(Austria)	GK	19 May 1997 (aged 27)	Unattached	2024	2024	1	0
36	Papuna Beruashvili	(Georgia (country))	GK	21 March 2004 (aged 20)	Academy	2022		0	0
37	Mikheil Makatsaria	(Georgia (country))	GK	11 June 2004 (aged 20)	Academy	2022		31	0
Defenders
2	Benson Anang	(Ghana)	DF	1 May 2000 (aged 24)	Othellos Athienou	2024		21	0
3	Aleksandre Kalandadze	(Georgia (country))	DF	9 May 2001 (aged 23)	Academy	2020	2024	107	4
4	Luka Salukvadze	(Georgia (country))	DF	28 January 2003 (aged 21)	Academy	2024		1	0
5	Solomon Kvirkvelia	(Georgia (country))	DF	6 February 1992 (aged 32)	Unattached	2024	2024	16	1
15	Mukhran Bagrationi	(Georgia (country))	DF	13 February 2004 (aged 20)	Telavi	2024		5	0
21	Tengo Gobeshia	(Georgia (country))	DF	7 January 2005 (aged 19)	Academy	2024		1	0
26	Shota Kverenchkhiladze	(Georgia (country))	DF	30 October 2004 (aged 20)	Academy	2023		1	0
35	Sunday Haruna	(Nigeria)	DF	1 June 2005 (aged 19)	AS Trenčín	2024	2025 (+2)	3	0
38	Saba Kharebashvili	(Georgia (country))	DF	3 September 2008 (aged 16)	Academy	2024		28	0
40	Saba Khvadagiani	(Georgia (country))	DF	30 January 2001 (aged 23)	on loan from Maccabi Netanya	2024	2025	118	6
Midfielders
6	Giorgi Tsetskhladze	(Georgia (country))	MF	4 March 2005 (aged 19)	Academy	2024		8	0
11	Saba Samushia	(Georgia (country))	MF	7 November 2006 (aged 18)	Academy	2024		13	0
16	Levan Osikmashvili	(Georgia (country))	MF	20 April 2002 (aged 22)	Academy	2022		84	0
17	Nosa Edokpolor	(Nigeria)	MF	22 September 1996 (aged 28)	Unattached	2024		14	0
18	Oscar Santis	(Guatemala)	MF	25 March 1999 (aged 25)	Antigua	2024	2025 (+1)	34	3
22	Nika Ninua	(Georgia (country))	MF	22 June 1999 (aged 25)	Unattached	2024		113	15
27	Nikoloz Ugrekhelidze	(Georgia (country))	MF	15 August 2003 (aged 21)	Academy	2023		49	6
28	Tsotne Berelidze	(Georgia (country))	MF	24 March 2006 (aged 18)	Academy	2023		27	0
30	Tjipe Karuuombe	(Namibia)	MF	21 September 2001 (aged 23)	UNAM	2024		1	0
32	Luka Bubuteishvili	(Georgia (country))	MF	12 February 2006 (aged 18)	Academy	2024		2	0
46	Levan Nachkebia	(Georgia (country))	MF	30 March 2006 (aged 18)	Academy	2024		1	0
Forwards
7	Vakhtang Salia	(Georgia (country))	FW	30 August 2007 (aged 17)	Academy	2023		39	7
9	Jaduli Iobashvili	(Georgia (country))	FW	1 January 2004 (aged 20)	Academy	2023	2024	28	2
10	Davit Skhirtladze	(Georgia (country))	FW	16 March 1993 (aged 31)	Viborg	2021	2024	85	26
12	Mate Vatsadze	(Georgia (country))	FW	17 December 1988 (aged 35)	Gagra	2024	2024		
19	David Gotsiridze	(Georgia (country))	FW	6 April 2004 (aged 20)	Academy	2024		14	1
20	Giorgi Gvishiani	(Georgia (country))	FW	19 November 2003 (aged 21)	Academy	2021	2024	11	0
24	Dominik Reiter	(Austria)	FW	4 January 1998 (aged 26)	SC Rheindorf Altach	2024	2025	18	2
25	Nikoloz Tshekladze	(Georgia (country))	FW	29 October 2005 (aged 19)	Academy	2024		20	2
31	Tornike Kirkitadze	(Georgia (country))	FW	23 July 1996 (aged 28)	Locomotive Tbilisi	2022		56	5
33	Vasilios Gordeziani	(Georgia (country))	FW	29 January 2002 (aged 22)	PAOK	2024	2026	26	6
44	Sandro Mikautadze	(Georgia (country))	FW	6 March 2009 (aged 15)	Academy	2024		1	0
47	Yusuf Mekhtiev	(Georgia (country))	FW	1 May 2006 (aged 18)	Academy	2024		1	0
Dinamo Tbilisi II Players
	Giorgi Meparishvili	(Georgia (country))	DF	11 June 2006 (aged 18)	Academy	2024		0	0
	Giorgi Chkhetiani	(Georgia (country))	DF	20 February 2003 (aged 21)	Academy	2024		0	0
Players away on loan
6	Nodar Lominadze	(Georgia (country))	MF	4 April 2002 (aged 22)	Academy	2021		27	1
12	Mate Sauri	(Georgia (country))	GK	6 June 2006 (aged 18)	Academy	2024		0	0
14	Alisher Shukurov	(Tajikistan)	MF	30 March 2002 (aged 22)	Kuktosh Rudaki	2024	2025 (+1)	3	0
17	Nika Sikharulashvili	(Georgia (country))	MF	7 October 2003 (aged 21)	Academy	2023		13	1
25	Tornike Morchiladze	(Georgia (country))	MF	10 January 2002 (aged 22)	Academy	2021	2024	29	1
Left during the season
1	Giorgi Loria	(Georgia (country))	GK	27 January 1986 (aged 38)	Anorthosis Famagusta	2023		279	0
5	Aleksandre Peikrishvili	(Georgia (country))	MF	14 June 2006 (aged 18)	Academy	2024		0	0
8	Dominique Simon	(France)	MF	29 July 2000 (aged 24)	Paide Linnameeskond	2024	2025	20	2
13	Daniel Romanovskij	(Lithuania)	MF	19 June 1996 (aged 28)	FA Šiauliai	2024	2025	9	1
21	Cadete	(Spain)	DF	24 June 1994 (aged 30)	Unattached	2023	2024	27	1
22	Temur Gognadze	(Georgia (country))	DF	25 April 2004 (aged 20)	Academy	2024		4	0
23	Giorgi Moistsrapishvili	(Georgia (country))	MF	29 September 2001 (aged 22)	Academy	2019	2024	89	13
24	Irakli Iakobidze	(Georgia (country))	DF	25 January 2002 (aged 22)	Academy	2021		2	0
30	Tornike Okriashvili	(Georgia (country))	MF	12 February 1992 (aged 32)	Unattached	2024	2024	11	1
31	Giorgi Maisuradze	(Georgia (country))	DF	31 January 2002 (aged 22)	Academy	2022		61	2
40	Joshua Akpudje	(Nigeria)	DF	23 July 1998 (aged 26)	Unattached	2024	2025 (+1)	9	0
	Vagner Gonçalves	(Brazil)	MF	27 April 1996 (aged 28)	Shkëndija	2023		16	3
	Nikoloz Tskhovrebashvili	(Georgia (country))	MF	7 January 2004 (aged 20)	Academy	2023		0	0

== Transfers ==
=== In ===
Date	Position	Nationality	Name	From	Fee	Ref.
23 January 2024	MF	(Lithuania)	Daniel Romanovskij	FA Šiauliai	Undisclosed	
24 January 2024	FW	(Guatemala)	Oscar Santis	Antigua	Undisclosed	
30 January 2024	MF	(France)	Dominique Simon	Paide Linnameeskond	Undisclosed	
11 February 2024	MF	(Tajikistan)	Alisher Shukurov	Kuktosh Rudaki	Undisclosed	
12 February 2024	DF	(Nigeria)	Joshua Akpudje	Unattached	Free	
12 February 2024	DF	(Nigeria)	Sunday Haruna	AS Trenčín	Undisclosed	
24 March 2024	FW	(Georgia (country))	Vasilios Gordeziani	PAOK	Undisclosed	
6 April 2024	MF	(Georgia (country))	Tornike Okriashvili	Unattached	Free	
25 June 2024	DF	(Georgia (country))	Mukhran Bagrationi	Telavi	Undisclosed	
30 July 2024	FW	(Austria)	Dominik Reiter	SC Rheindorf Altach	Undisclosed	
1 August 2024	DF	(Ghana)	Benson Anang	Othellos Athienou	Undisclosed	
1 August 2024	MF	(Georgia (country))	Nika Ninua	Unattached	Free	
2 September 2024	DF	(Georgia (country))	Solomon Kvirkvelia	Unattached	Free	
5 September 2024	FW	(Georgia (country))	Mate Vatsadze	Gagra	Undisclosed	
10 September 2024	MF	(Nigeria)	Nosa Edokpolor	Unattached	Free	
1 October 2024	MF	(Namibia)	Tjipe Karuuombe	UNAM	Undisclosed	
16 November 2024	GK	(Austria)	Tobias Schützenauer	Unattached	Free	

=== Loans in ===
Date from	Position	Nationality	Name	From	Date to	Ref.
3 July 2024	DF	(Georgia (country))	Saba Khvadagiani	Maccabi Netanya	30 June 2025	

=== Out ===
Date	Position	Nationality	Name	To	Fee	Ref.
19 January 2024	MF	(Georgia (country))	Anzor Mekvabishvili	Universitatea Craiova	Undisclosed	
21 January 2024	MF	(Guinea)	Ousmane Camara	Astana	Undisclosed	
21 January 2024	FW	(Georgia (country))	Lasha Odisharia	RFS	Undisclosed	
31 January 2024	DF	(Georgia (country))	Saba Khvadagiani	Maccabi Netanya	Undisclosed	
4 February 2024	DF	(Georgia (country))	Luka Latsabidze	Shakhtar Donetsk	Undisclosed	
7 February 2024	DF	(Georgia (country))	Davit Kobouri	Újpest	Undisclosed	
10 February 2024	DF	(Georgia (country))	Nikoloz Mali	Dinamo Batumi	Undisclosed	
16 June 2024	DF	(Georgia (country))	Giorgi Maisuradze	Polissya Zhytomyr	Undisclosed	
4 July 2024	GK	(Georgia (country))	Giorgi Loria	Omonia Aradippou	Undisclosed	
1 July 2024	DF	(Georgia (country))	Irakli Iakobidze	Gagra	Undisclosed	
1 July 2024	MF	(Brazil)	Vagner Gonçalves	Pyunik	Undisclosed	
16 July 2024	MF	(Georgia (country))	Aleksandre Peikrishvili	Dynamo Kyiv	Undisclosed	
20 July 2024	DF	(Spain)	Cadete	Real Murcia	Undisclosed	
10 August 2024	MF	(France)	Dominique Simon	Pardubice	Undisclosed	
2 September 2024	MF	(Georgia (country))	Giorgi Moistsrapishvili	Kolos Kovalivka	Undisclosed	
15 September 2024	MF	(Georgia (country))	Tornike Okriashvili	TFA Dubai	Undisclosed	

=== Loans out ===
Date from	Position	Nationality	Name	To	Date to	Ref.
10 July 2023	MF	(Brazil)	Vagner Gonçalves	Pyunik	31 May 2024	
5 September 2023	MF	(Georgia (country))	Giorgi Moistsrapishvili	Beveren	26 March 2024	
10 February 2024	FW	(Georgia (country))	Davit Skhirtladze	Kocaelispor	31 May 2024	
10 July 2024	MF	(Tajikistan)	Alisher Shukurov	Vakhsh Bokhtar	31 December 2024	
24 July 2024	FW	(Georgia (country))	Nodar Lominadze	Dila Gori	31 December 2024	
8 August 2024	MF	(Georgia (country))	Nika Sikharulashvili	Makedonikos	30 June 2025	
13 August 2024	GK	(Georgia (country))	Mate Sauri	Rio Ave	30 June 2025	

=== Released ===
Date	Position	Nationality	Name	Joined	Date	Ref.
5 January 2024	DF	(Georgia (country))	Gagi Margvelashvili	Oakland Roots	5 January 2024	
8 January 2024	DF	(Georgia (country))	Luka Lakvekheliani	Kolkheti-1913 Poti		
8 January 2024	MF	(Croatia)	Denis Bušnja	BG Pathum United		
8 January 2024	MF	(Georgia (country))	Vato Arveladze	Kolkheti-1913 Poti		
8 January 2024	MF	(Ivory Coast)	Moussa Sangare	Dila Gori		
8 January 2024	MF	(Serbia)	Zoran Marušić	Nasaf	5 January 2024	
16 January 2024	MF	(Ghana)	Barnes Osei	Astana	16 January 2024	
19 January 2024	GK	(Georgia (country))	Davit Kereselidze	Dila Gori		
13 June 2024	DF	(Nigeria)	Joshua Akpudje	Ilves	11 July 2024	
13 June 2024	MF	(Lithuania)	Daniel Romanovskij	FA Šiauliai	18 June 2024	
1 July 2024	FW	(Georgia (country))	Giorgi Gvishiani	Sioni Bolnisi		
31 December 2024	DF	(Georgia (country))	Solomon Kvirkvelia	Torpedo Kutaisi	6 February 2024	
31 December 2024	DF	(Nigeria)	Sunday Haruna			
31 December 2024	MF	(Namibia)	Tjipe Karuuombe	Gonio	21 July 2025	

=== Trial ===
Date from	Position	Nationality	Name	Last club	Date end	Ref.
January 2024	DF	(Nigeria)	Joshua Akpudje	Unattached	12 February 2024	
January 2024	DF	(Nigeria)	Sunday Haruna	AS Trenčín	12 February 2024	
January 2024	FW	(Georgia (country))	Giorgi Lomtadze	Gagra	10 February 2024	

== Friendlies ==
20 January 2024	Locomotive Tbilisi	2–0	Dinamo Tbilisi	Tbilisi
15:00 GET (UTC+4)	Makharoblidze; Gavashelishvili	Report		Stadium: Mikheil Meskhi Stadium

25 January 2024	Dinamo Tbilisi	1–2	Telavi	Tbilisi
17:00 GET (UTC+4)	Skhirtladze	Report	Zhividze	Stadium: Boris Paichadze Dinamo Arena

31 January 2024	Dinamo Tbilisi	0–3	Bohemians 1905	Antalya, Turkey
17:00 GET (UTC+4)		Report	Kozák 49', 82'; Hála 76' (pen.)

4 February 2024	Dinamo Tbilisi	0–1	Zorya Luhansk	Antalya, Turkey
17:30 GET (UTC+4)		Report	Antyukh

8 February 2024	Dinamo Tbilisi	2–0	Valmiera	Antalya, Turkey
13:00 GET (UTC+4)	Salia 22'; Skhirtladze 88'	Report		Stadium: Kamelya Selin Center

13 February 2024	Dynamo Kyiv	0–0	Dinamo Tbilisi	Antalya, Turkey
18:00 GET (UTC+4)		Report

16 February 2024	Dinamo Samarqand	1–0	Dinamo Tbilisi	Antalya, Turkey
14:30 GET (UTC+4)	Kozak 10'	Report

19 February 2024	Bălți	0–4	Dinamo Tbilisi	Antalya, Turkey
17:00 GET (UTC+4)		Report	Simon 15'; Gotsiridze 65'; Romanovskij 72'; Santis 75'

== Competitions ==
=== Overview ===
Competition	First match	Last match	Starting round	Final position	Record							
Competition	First match	Last match	Starting round	Final position	Pld	W	D	L	GF	GA	GD	Win %
Erovnuli Liga	2 March 2024	8 December 2024	Matchday 1	7th	36	9	12	15	33	44	−11	25.00
Georgian Cup	28 July 2024	5 December 2024	Round of 16	Runnerup	4	3	1	0	6	3	+3	75.00
Super Cup	28 June 2024	3 July 2024	Semifinal	Runnerup	2	1	0	1	3	2	+1	50.00
UEFA Conference League	11 July 2024	18 July 2024	Second qualifying round	Second qualifying round	2	0	1	1	2	3	−1	0.00
Total					44	13	14	17	44	52	−8	29.55

Last updated: 8 December 2024
Source: Competitions

=== Super Cup ===
28 June 2024 Semifinal	Iberia 1999	0 – 2	Dinamo Tbilisi	Tbilisi
20:00 GET (UTC+4)	Jinjolava (yellow card) 29'; Sylla (yellow card) 78'; Agyakwa (yellow card) 81'; Nonikashvili (yellow card) 90+1'	Report	Okriashvili 41' (pen.); Kalandadze (yellow card) 57'; Ugrekhelidze (yellow card) 68'; Cadete (yellow card) 89'; Lominadze 90+3' (pen.)	Stadium: David Petriashvili Stadium; Attendance: 2,130; Referee: Badri Ninua

3 July 2024 Final	Dinamo Tbilisi	1 – 2	Torpedo Kutaisi	Tbilisi
21:00 GET (UTC+4)	Tshekladze 85'; Ugrekhelidze (yellow card) 90'	Report	Éliton 4' (yellow card) 45+4'; Ninković 61'; Gigauri (yellow card) 78'; Auro (yellow card) 82'; Johnsen (yellow card) 90'; Nadaraia (yellow card) 90+1'	Stadium: David Petriashvili Stadium; Referee: Giorgi Kruashvili

=== Erovnuli Liga ===
==== Results summary ====
Overall								Home						Away					
Pld	W	D	L	GF	GA	GD	Pts	W	D	L	GF	GA	GD	W	D	L	GF	GA	GD
36	9	12	15	33	44	−11	39	6	6	6	22	18	+4	3	6	9	11	26	−15

Last updated: 8 December 2024.
Source: See Results

==== Results by round ====
Round	1	2	3	4	5	6	7	8	9	10	11	12	13	14	15	16	17	18	19	20	21	22	23	24	25	26	27	28	29	30	31	32	33	34	35	36
Ground	H	A	H	A	H	H	A	H	A	A	H	A	H	A	A	H	A	H	H	A	H	A	H	H	A	H	A	A	H	A	H	A	A	H	A	H
Result	W	L	W	L	D	D	L	D	W	L	D	D	W	D	L	L	D	W	L	W	L	L	D	D	D	W	D	W	W	L	L	D	L	L	L	L
Position	3	6	4	4	5	5	6	7	5	5	6	5	5	5	5	6	6	5	5	5	6	7	7	7	6	6	5	5	5	5	5	5	6	6	6	7

Source: See Results
A = Away; H = Home; W = Win; D = Draw; L = Loss

==== Results ====
2 March 2024 1	Dinamo Tbilisi	2–0	Samgurali Tsqaltubo	Tbilisi
19:00 GET (UTC+4)	Cadete (yellow card) 7'; Simon 10' (yellow card) 29'; Sikharulashvili 32'; Shukurov (yellow card) 77'; Ugrekhelidze (yellow card) 82'; Maisuradze (yellow card) 89' (yellow-red card) 89'	Report	Khorkheli (yellow card) 79' (yellow-red card) 82'; Kikabidze (yellow card) 85'	Stadium: Boris Paichadze Dinamo Arena; Referee: Irakli Kvirikashvili

6 March 2024 2	Telavi	4–0	Dinamo Tbilisi	Rustavi
20:00 GET (UTC+4)	Tsnobiladze 10' (yellow card) 31'; Mkhladze 23'; Akhvlediani 45+1'; Khabuliani (yellow card) 81' (goal) 83'	Report	Gotsiridze (yellow card) 34'; Akpudje (yellow card) 75'	Stadium: GFF Technical Centre; Referee: Goga Kikacheishvili

10 March 2024 3	Dinamo Tbilisi	1–0	Torpedo Kutaisi	Tbilisi
20:00 GET (UTC+4)	Salia 33'; Lominadze (yellow card) 48'; Maisuradze (yellow card) 57'; Sikharulashvili (yellow card) 90+5'; Gotsiridze (yellow card) 90+8'	Report	Mandzhgaladze (yellow card) 69'; Ninković (yellow card) 90+5'	Stadium: Boris Paichadze Dinamo Arena; Referee: Jener Khorava

15 March 2024 4	Iberia 1999	1–0	Dinamo Tbilisi	Tbilisi
19:30 GET (UTC+4)	G.Mamageishvili (yellow card) 13'; Komakhidze (yellow card) 45'; Mamatsashvili 45+2'	Report	Lominadze (yellow card) 13'; Loria (red card) 34'; Maisuradze (yellow card) 48'; Ugrekhelidze (yellow card) 73'	Stadium: David Petriashvili Stadium; Referee: Irakli Kherkhadze

30 March 2024 5	Dinamo Tbilisi	1–1	Samtredia	Tbilisi
19:00 GET (UTC+4)	Kalandadze (yellow card) 2'; Simon (yellow card) 62'; Salia (yellow card) 66'; Gotsiridze (yellow card) 71'; Romanovskij 89' (yellow card) 90+5'	Report	Barrios (yellow card) 25'; Haydary 46'; Injgia (yellow card) 53'; Khmaladze (yellow card) 90+5'	Stadium: Boris Paichadze Dinamo Arena; Referee: Giorgi Avazashvili

3 April 2024 6	Dinamo Tbilisi	2–2	Dila Gori	Tbilisi
21:00 GET (UTC+4)	Gordeziani 29'; Simon (yellow card) 82'; Salia 85'	Report	Drame 50'; Shekiladze 89'	Stadium: Boris Paichadze Dinamo Arena; Referee: Goga Kikacheishvili

8 April 2024 7	Dinamo Batumi	2–0	Dinamo Tbilisi	Batumi
21:00 GET (UTC+4)	Gomis 34'; Victor (yellow card) 56'; Mali (yellow card) 58'; Kutalia 68'	Report	Lominadze (yellow card) 5'; Simon (yellow card) 40'; Cadete (yellow card) 45+5'	Stadium: Adjarabet Arena; Referee: Giorgi Kruashvili

12 April 2024 8	Dinamo Tbilisi	0–0	Kolkheti-1913	Tbilisi
19:00 GET (UTC+4)	Akpudje (yellow card) 74'; Cadete (yellow card) 77'	Report	Datuashvili (yellow card) 30'; Kharshiladze (yellow card) 81'	Stadium: Boris Paichadze Dinamo Arena; Referee: Badri Ninua

16 April 2024 9	Gagra	0–2	Dinamo Tbilisi	Tbilisi
19:00 GET (UTC+4)	Kakubava (yellow card) 21'	Report	Akpudje (yellow card) 31'; Ugrekhelidze 64'; Gordeziani 70'	Stadium: David Petriashvili Arena; Referee: Aleko Aptsiauri

20 April 2024 10	Samgurali Tsqaltubo	3–1	Dinamo Tbilisi	Tsqaltubo
16:00 GET (UTC+4)	Simon 44' (o.g.); Gabriel 48'; Chikhladze 66'; Dartsmelia (yellow card) 72'	Report	Santis (yellow card) 23'; Iobashvili 32'; Maisuradze (yellow card) 41'; Akpudje (yellow card) 76'; Sikharulashvili (yellow card) 83'	Stadium: 26 May Stadium; Referee: Giorgi Kruashvili

26 April 2024 11	Dinamo Tbilisi	0–0	Telavi	Tbilisi
20:00 GET (UTC+4)	Ugrekhelidze (yellow card) 11'; Lominadze (yellow card) 90+1'; Kalandadze (yellow card) 90+1'	Report	Parkinashvili (yellow card) 25'; Khalnazarov (yellow card) 90+1'; Zhividze (yellow card) 90+1'; Morchiladze (yellow card) 90+1'; Peruzzi (yellow card) 90+5'	Stadium: Boris Paichadze Dinamo Arena; Referee: Kote Giorgadze

2 May 2024 12	Torpedo Kutaisi	0–0	Dinamo Tbilisi	Kutaisi
21:00 GET (UTC+4)	Arabidze (yellow card) 15'; Jorginho (yellow card) 45+1'	Report	Cadete (yellow card) 27' (yellow-red card) 54'; Moistsrapishvili (yellow card) 30'; Kalandadze (yellow card) 89'	Stadium: Ramaz Shengelia Stadium; Referee: Giorgi Avazashvili

10 May 2024 13	Dinamo Tbilisi	1–0	Iberia 1999	Tbilisi
21:00 GET (UTC+4)	Santis 19'; Kharebashvili (yellow card) 26'; Kalandadze (yellow card) 45+5'; Iobashvili (yellow card) 47'	Report	Jgerenaia (red card) 45'; Nonikashvili (yellow card) 50'	Stadium: Boris Paichadze Dinamo Arena; Referee: Goga Kikacheishvili

14 May 2024 14	Samtredia	0–0	Dinamo Tbilisi	Samtredia
16:30 GET (UTC+4)	Assunpção (yellow card) 40'; Khmaladze (yellow card) 90+1'	Report	Berelidze (yellow card) 77'	Stadium: Erosi Manjgaladze Stadium; Referee: Giorgi Kruashvili

18 May 2024 15	Dila Gori	2–1	Dinamo Tbilisi	Gori
20:00 GET (UTC+4)	Shekiladze (yellow card) 28'; Wouter (yellow card) 45'; Nóbrega 48'; Bochorishvili (yellow card) 70'; Araújo (yellow card) 71'; Dramé 90+3'; Asamoah (yellow card) 90+8'	Report	Ugrekhelidze 5' (yellow card) 28'; Kalandadze (yellow card) 34' (yellow-red card) 55'; Salia (yellow card) 52'; Tshekladze (yellow card) 80'; Akpudje (red card) 82'	Stadium: Tengiz Burjanadze Stadium; Referee: Jener Khorava

23 May 2024 16	Dinamo Tbilisi	1–2	Dinamo Batumi	Tbilisi
20:00 GET (UTC+4)	Simon (yellow card) 36'; Gordeziani 39'; Maisuradze (yellow card) 64' (yellow-red card) 90+7'; Iobashvili (yellow card) 90+7'	Report	Gudushauri 46'; Mara 53' (yellow card) 67'	Stadium: Boris Paichadze Dinamo Arena; Referee: Badri Ninua

27 May 2024 17	Kolkheti-1913	2–2	Dinamo Tbilisi	Poti
20:00 GET (UTC+4)	Kharebava 20'; Melkadze 65'; Kharshiladze (yellow card) 71'	Report	Santis 3'; Cadete (yellow card) 83'; Moistsrapishvili 90+2'	Stadium: Fazisi Stadium; Referee: Goga Kikacheishvili

1 June 2024 18	Dinamo Tbilisi	2–0	Gagra	Tbilisi
20:30 GET (UTC+4)	Simon 48' (yellow card) 67'; Salia 90+5'	Report	Vatsadze (yellow card) 67'; Jangidze (yellow card) 90+1'	Stadium: Boris Paichadze Dinamo Arena; Referee: Irakli Kherkhadze

3 August 2024 19	Dinamo Tbilisi	0–1	Samgurali Tsqaltubo	Tbilisi
16:00 GET (UTC+4)	Osikmashvili (yellow card) 39'; Khvadagiani (yellow card) 75'	Report	Jefinho (yellow card) 21'; L.Khorkheli (yellow card) 34'; Markovina (yellow card) 59'; Kutalia 73'; Kalandarishvili (yellow card) 84'	Stadium: Boris Paichadze Dinamo Arena; Referee: Kote Giorgadze

10 August 2024 20	Telavi	0–1	Dinamo Tbilisi	Telavi
20:00 GET (UTC+4)	Tolordava (yellow card) 90+10'	Report	Reiter 21'; Santis (yellow card) 24'; Ninua (yellow card) 30'; Ugrekhelidze; (yellow card) 34'; Osikmashvili (yellow card) 50'; Samushia (yellow card) 85'; Khvadagiani (yellow card) 90+10'	Stadium: Caucasus Arena; Referee: Irakli Kherkhadze

18 August 2024 21	Dinamo Tbilisi	1–2	Torpedo Kutaisi	Tbilisi
20:00 GET (UTC+4)	Ninua 29'	Report	Yansané 35', 42'; Bidzinashvili (yellow card) 45+3'; Mandzhgaladze (yellow card) 45+4'; Shergelashvili (yellow card) 69'; Oloko-Obi (yellow card) 83'	Stadium: Boris Paichadze Dinamo Arena; Referee: Aleko Aptsiauri

25 August 2024 22	Iberia 1999	3–0	Dinamo Tbilisi	Tbilisi
20:00 GET (UTC+4)	Sylla 17', 30'; Kokhreidze 39' (pen.)	Report	Khvadagiani (yellow card) 22'; Makatsaria (yellow card) 38'; Kalandadze (yellow card) 45'	Stadium: David Petriashvili Stadium; Referee: Irakli Kvirikashvili

31 August 2024 23	Dinamo Tbilisi	1–1	Samtredia	Tbilisi
20:00 GET (UTC+4)	Salia (yellow card) 39'; Assunpção 71' (o.g.); Samushia (yellow card) 89'	Report	Assunpção 17'; Kvaratskhelia (yellow card) 34'	Stadium: Boris Paichadze Dinamo Arena; Referee: Giorgi Kruashvili

15 September 2024 24	Dinamo Tbilisi	1–1	Dila Gori	Tbilisi
20:00 GET (UTC+4)	Kalandadze 83'; Ugrekhelidze (yellow card) 90+5'	Report	Rukhadze (yellow card) 76'; Lominadze (yellow card) 86'; Wouter 88' (pen.) (yellow card) 90+5'; Kaly (yellow card) 90+5'	Stadium: Boris Paichadze Dinamo Arena; Referee: Jener Khorava

23 September 2024 25	Dinamo Batumi	1–1	Dinamo Tbilisi	Batumi
21:00 GET (UTC+4)	Balbúrdia 28'; Wanderson (yellow card) 54'	Report	Berelidze (yellow card) 51'; Khvadagiani (yellow card) 77'; Kvirkvelia (yellow card) 77' (goal) 81'	Stadium: Adjarabet Arena; Referee: Aleko Aptsiauri

27 September 2024 26	Dinamo Tbilisi	3–2	Kolkheti-1913	Tbilisi
19:00 GET (UTC+4)	Berelidze (yellow card) 13'; Datuashvili 50' (o.g.); Edokpolor (yellow card) 70'; Santis 87'; Gordeziani 90+4'	Report	Abuashvili 41'; Klimov 44'; Datuashvili (yellow card) 83'; Shekiladze (yellow card) 87'	Stadium: Boris Paichadze Dinamo Arena; Referee: Kote Giorgadze

1 October 2024 27	Gagra	0–0	Dinamo Tbilisi	Tbilisi
20:00 GET (UTC+4)	Augusto (yellow card) 19'; Kavtaradze (yellow card) 68'; Iakobidze (yellow card) 90+2'	Report	Kvirkvelia (yellow card) 33'; Ninua (yellow card) 65'	Stadium: David Petriashvili Arena; Referee: Goga Kikacheishvili

5 October 2024 28	Samgurali Tsqaltubo	1–2	Dinamo Tbilisi	Tsqaltubo
15:30 GET (UTC+4)	Chikhladze 40' (pen.); Patarkatsishvili (yellow card) 64'	Report	Reiter 29'; Ninua (yellow card) 44'; Kvirkvelia (yellow card) 45+2'; Gordeziani 86'	Stadium: 26 May Stadium; Referee: Giorgi Avazashvili

19 October 2024 29	Dinamo Tbilisi	5–1	Telavi	Tbilisi
18:00 GET (UTC+4)	Khvadagiani 20'; Salia 38', 60'; Berelidze (yellow card) 42'; Gordeziani 66'; Vatsadze 80'	Report	Gogotishvili (yellow card) 46'; Georgijević 78'; Désiré (yellow card) 90'	Stadium: Boris Paichadze Dinamo Arena; Referee: Zurab Tabagua

28 October 2024 30	Torpedo Kutaisi	2–0	Dinamo Tbilisi	Kutaisi
21:00 GET (UTC+4)	Gigauri (yellow card) 77'; Sandokhadze (yellow card) 81'; Mandzhgaladze (yellow card) 83'; Johnsen 90+2'; Ninković (yellow card) 90+4'	Report	Ugrekhelidze (yellow card) 41'; Kharebashvili (yellow card) 45+3'; Osikmashvili (yellow card) 45+4'; Kalandadze (yellow card) 81'	Stadium: Ramaz Shengelia Stadium; Referee: Kote Giorgadze

1 November 2024 31	Dinamo Tbilisi	0–2	Iberia 1999	Tbilisi
20:00 GET (UTC+4)	Kalandadze (yellow card) 11' (yellow-red card) 17'; Berelidze (yellow card) 43'	Report	Sylla 1', 32'; Agyakwa (yellow card) 79'	Stadium: Boris Paichadze Dinamo Arena; Referee: Goga Kikacheishvili

9 November 2024 32	Samtredia	1–1	Dinamo Tbilisi	Samtredia
14:30 GET (UTC+4)	Assunpção (yellow card) 7'; Owusu 35'; Carrillo (yellow card) 42'	Report	Edokpolor (yellow card) 5'; Kharebashvili (yellow card) 13' (red card) 90'; Salia 22'; Ugrekhelidze (yellow card) 80'	Stadium: Erosi Manjgaladze Stadium; Referee: Giorgi Avazashvili

23 November 2024 33	Dila Gori	1–0	Dinamo Tbilisi	Gori
18:00 GET (UTC+4)	Lominadze (yellow card) 9'; Kaly (yellow card) 71'; Dramé 90+5'	Report	Santis (yellow card) 41'; Tskhlitadze (yellow card) 53'; Berelidze (yellow card) 68'; Vatsadze (yellow card) 71'	Stadium: Tengiz Burjanadze Stadium; Referee: Irakli Shengelia

27 November 2024 34	Dinamo Tbilisi	1–2	Dinamo Batumi	Tbilisi
14:00 GET (UTC+4)	Khvadagiani (yellow card) 33'; Ugrekhelidze 58'; Santis (yellow card) 70' (yellow-red card) 90+7'; Vatsadze (red card) 75'; Berelidze (yellow card) 80'	Report	Blesa 15' (pen.) (red card) 75'; Dumbadze 27'; Chiteishvili (yellow card) 72'	Stadium: Boris Paichadze Dinamo Arena; Referee: Koba Revazashvili

1 December 2024 35	Kolkheti-1913	3–0	Dinamo Tbilisi	Poti
13:30 GET (UTC+4)	Akhaladze 16'; Jijavadze 23'; Piranashvili (yellow card) 40'; Abuashvili 88'	Report	Kalandadze (yellow card) 40'; Samushia (yellow card) 77'	Stadium: Fazisi Stadium; Referee: Goga Kikacheishvili

8 December 2024 36	Dinamo Tbilisi	0–1	Gagra	Tbilisi
13:30 GET (UTC+4)		Report	Kharebashvili 62'	Stadium: Boris Paichadze Dinamo Arena; Referee: Irakli Kherkhadze

==== League table ====
Pos	Team	Pld	W	D	L	GF	GA	GD	Pts	Qualification or relegation
5	Samgurali Tsqaltubo	36	11	11	14	51	49	+2	44	
6	Kolkheti-1913	36	9	14	13	48	58	−10	41	
7	Dinamo Tbilisi	36	9	12	15	33	44	−11	39	
8	Gagra (O)	36	11	5	20	36	53	−17	38	Qualification to Relegation play-offs
9	Telavi (O)	36	8	10	18	32	43	−11	34	Qualification to Relegation play-offs

Source: Erovnuli Liga, Soccerway
Rules for classification: 1) Points; 2) Head-to-head points; 3) Head-to-head goal difference; 4) Head-to-head goals scored; 5) Head-to-head away goals scored (only if two teams); 6) Goal difference; 7) Goals scored.
(O) Play-off winners

=== Georgian Cup ===
28 July 2024 Round of 16	Iberia 1999	1–2	Dinamo Tbilisi	Tbilisi
20:00 GET (UTC+4)	Mamatsashvili 36' (yellow card) 63'	Report	Tshekladze 20'; Khvadagiani 26'	Stadium: David Petriashvili Stadium; Referee: Aleko Aptsiauri

19 September 2024 Quarterfinal	Dinamo Tbilisi	1–0	Dinamo Batumi	Tbilisi
20:00 (UTC+6)	Gotsiridze 52'; Berelidze (yellow card) 78'; Kalandadze (yellow card) 90'	Report		Stadium: Boris Paichadze Dinamo Arena; Referee: Irakli Kvirikashvili

5 November 2024 Semifinal	Dinamo Tbilisi	1–0	Kolkheti-1913	Tbilisi
19:00 (UTC+6)	Ninua (yellow card) 9'; Ugrekhelidze (yellow card) 55'; Vatsadze 65' (pen.); Osikmashvili (yellow card) 90+3'	Report	Zoidze (yellow card) 22'	Stadium: Boris Paichadze Dinamo Arena; Referee: Irakli Kvirikashvili

5 December 2024 Final	Spaeri	2–2 (a.e.t.) (5–4 p)	Dinamo Tbilisi	Tbilisi
19:00 (UTC+6)	G.D.Tsetskhladze 45+1'; Gegiadze 89'; Samkharadze (yellow card) 103'; Chagunava (yellow card) 117'	Report	Vatsadze 64'; Khvadagiani 68'; Anang (yellow card) 77'; Kharebashvili (yellow card) 90'	Stadium: Mikheil Meskhi Stadium; Referee: Aleko Aptsiauri
	Penalties
	Chagunava (penalty scored); Samkharadze (penalty scored); Kenchadze (penalty missed); Bunturi (penalty scored); Gegiadze (penalty scored); Barabadze (penalty scored)		(penalty missed) Osikmashvili; (penalty scored) Salia; (penalty scored) Kharebashvili; (penalty scored) Khvadagiani; (penalty scored) Vatsadze; (penalty missed) Ugrekhelidze

=== UEFA Europa Conference League ===
==== Qualifying rounds ====
11 July 2024 First qualifying round 1st leg	FK Mornar (Montenegro)	2–1	(Georgia (country)) Dinamo Tbilisi	Podgorica Montenegro
22:45 GET (UTC+4)	Đurišić 20', (yellow card) 89'; Vušurović 24'; Dubljević (yellow card) 38'; Seratlić (red card) 84'	Report	Ugrekhelidze (yellow card) 44', (goal) 90+4'; Kalandadze (yellow card) 68'; Moistsrapishvili (yellow card) 87'; Khvadagiani (yellow card) 87'	Stadium: DG Arena; Attendance: 650; Referee: Georgi Ginchev (Bulgaria)
Note: Mornar Bar played their home match at the DG Arena in Podgorica, instead of their regular stadium, the Stadion Topolica, in Bar, which did not meet UEFA requirements.

18 July 2024 First qualifying round 2nd leg	Dinamo Tbilisi (Georgia (country))	1–1 (2–3 agg.)	(Montenegro) FK Mornar	Tbilisi, Georgia
21:00 GET (UTC+4)	Ugrekhelidze (red card) 20'; Salia 33'; Simon (yellow card) 37'; Lominadze (yellow card) 83'	Report	Dubljević (yellow card) 34'; Zorić 57' (yellow card) 58'; Vušurović (yellow card) 90+8'; Popovic (yellow card) 90+9'	Stadium: Mikheil Meskhi Stadium; Referee: Ion Orlic (Moldova)

== Squad statistics ==
As of match played 8 December 2024

=== Appearances and goals ===
No.	Pos	Nat	Player	Total		Erovnuli Liga		Georgian Cup		Super Cup		UEFA Conference League	
No.	Pos	Nat	Player	Apps	Goals	Apps	Goals	Apps	Goals	Apps	Goals	Apps	Goals
1	GK	(Austria) AUT	Tobias Schützenauer	1	0	1	0	0	0	0	0	0	0
2	DF	(Ghana) GHA	Benson Anang	21	0	17+1	0	3	0	0	0	0	0
3	DF	(Georgia (country)) GEO	Aleksandre Kalandadze	36	1	28+1	1	3	0	2	0	2	0
4	DF	(Georgia (country)) GEO	Luka Salukvadze	1	0	1	0	0	0	0	0	0	0
5	DF	(Georgia (country)) GEO	Solomon Kvirkvelia	16	1	13	1	3	0	0	0	0	0
6	MF	(Georgia (country)) GEO	Giorgi Tskhlitadze	8	0	4+1	0	0+3	0	0	0	0	0
7	FW	(Georgia (country)) GEO	Vakhtang Salia	36	7	23+6	6	1+2	0	2	0	2	1
9	FW	(Georgia (country)) GEO	Jaduli Iobashvili	18	1	6+9	1	0	0	0+1	0	0+2	0
10	FW	(Georgia (country)) GEO	Davit Skhirtladze	3	0	0	0	0+1	0	0	0	1+1	0
11	MF	(Georgia (country)) GEO	Saba Samushia	13	0	1+8	0	1	0	0+1	0	0+2	0
12	FW	(Georgia (country)) GEO	Mate Vatsadze	9	3	3+4	1	1+1	2	0	0	0	0
15	DF	(Georgia (country)) GEO	Mukhran Bagrationi	5	0	0	0	1	0	2	0	1+1	0
16	MF	(Georgia (country)) GEO	Levan Osikmashvili	39	0	19+12	0	3+1	0	2	0	2	0
17	MF	(Nigeria) NGR	Nosa Edokpolor	14	0	12	0	2	0	0	0	0	0
18	MF	(Guatemala) GUA	Oscar Santis	34	3	22+7	3	1	0	1+1	0	2	0
19	FW	(Georgia (country)) GEO	David Gotsiridze	14	1	7+6	0	1	1	0	0	0	0
20	FW	(Georgia (country)) GEO	Giorgi Gvishiani	11	0	3+7	0	1	0	0	0	0	0
21	DF	(Georgia (country)) GEO	Tengo Gobeshia	1	0	1	0	0	0	0	0	0	0
22	MF	(Georgia (country)) GEO	Nika Ninua	19	1	12+4	1	2+1	0	0	0	0	0
24	FW	(Austria) AUT	Dominik Reiter	18	2	10+5	2	2+1	0	0	0	0	0
25	FW	(Georgia (country)) GEO	Nikoloz Tshekladze	20	2	4+10	0	1+1	1	2	1	1+1	0
27	MF	(Georgia (country)) GEO	Nikoloz Ugrekhelidze	41	4	21+12	3	1+3	0	2	0	2	1
28	MF	(Georgia (country)) GEO	Tsotne Berelidze	27	0	15+7	0	2+1	0	1+1	0	0	0
30	MF	(Namibia) NAM	Tjipe Karuuombe	1	0	1	0	0	0	0	0	0	0
31	MF	(Georgia (country)) GEO	Tornike Kirkitadze	8	0	1+5	0	0+2	0	0	0	0	0
32	MF	(Georgia (country)) GEO	Luka Bubuteishvili	2	0	0+2	0	0	0	0	0	0	0
33	FW	(Georgia (country)) GEO	Vasilios Gordeziani	26	6	10+13	6	1+1	0	0+1	0	0	0
35	DF	(Nigeria) NGR	Sunday Haruna	3	0	0+3	0	0	0	0	0	0	0
37	GK	(Georgia (country)) GEO	Mikheil Makatsaria	31	0	22+1	0	4	0	2	0	2	0
38	DF	(Georgia (country)) GEO	Saba Kharebashvili	28	0	17+4	0	4	0	2	0	1	0
40	DF	(Georgia (country)) GEO	Saba Khvadagiani	24	3	16+1	1	4	2	0+1	0	2	0
44	FW	(Georgia (country)) GEO	Sandro Mikautadze	1	0	0+1	0	0	0	0	0	0	0
46	MF	(Georgia (country)) GEO	Levan Nachkebia	1	0	0+1	0	0	0	0	0	0	0
47	FW	(Georgia (country)) GEO	Yusuf Mekhtiev	1	0	1	0	0	0	0	0	0	0
Players away from Dinamo Tbilisi on loan:
6	MF	(Georgia (country)) GEO	Nodar Lominadze	17	1	8+5	0	0	0	1+1	1	1+1	0
14	MF	(Tajikistan) TJK	Alisher Shukurov	3	0	0+3	0	0	0	0	0	0	0
17	MF	(Georgia (country)) GEO	Nika Sikharulashvili	12	1	7+4	1	0	0	1	0	0	0
Players who left Astana during the season:
1	GK	(Georgia (country)) GEO	Giorgi Loria	13	0	13	0	0	0	0	0	0	0
8	{{{pos}}}	(France) FRA	Dominique Simonpos=MF	20	2	15	2	1	0	1+1	0	2	0
13	MF	(Lithuania) LTU	Daniel Romanovskij	9	1	7+2	1	0	0	0	0	0	0
21	DF	(Spain) ESP	Cadete	18	0	16	0	0	0	0+1	0	0+1	0
22	DF	(Georgia (country)) GEO	Temur Gognadze	1	0	1	0	0	0	0	0	0	0
23	MF	(Georgia (country)) GEO	Giorgi Moistsrapishvili	20	1	15+3	1	0	0	0+1	0	0+1	0
24	DF	(Georgia (country)) GEO	Irakli Iakobidze	2	0	1+1	0	0	0	0	0	0	0
30	MF	(Georgia (country)) GEO	Tornike Okriashvili	11	1	3+5	0	1	0	1	1	1	0
31	DF	(Georgia (country)) GEO	Giorgi Maisuradze	13	0	13	0	0	0	0	0	0	0
40	DF	(Nigeria) NGR	Joshua Akpudje	9	0	6+3	0	0	0	0	0	0	0

=== Goal scorers ===
Place	Position	Nation	Number	Name	Erovnuli Liga	Georgian Cup	Super Cup	UEFA Conference League	Total
1	FW	(Georgia (country))	7	Vakhtang Salia	6	0	0	1	7
2	FW	(Georgia (country))	33	Vasilios Gordeziani	6	0	0	0	6
3	MF	(Georgia (country))	27	Nikoloz Ugrekhelidze	3	0	0	1	4
4	MF	(Guatemala)	18	Oscar Santis	3	0	0	0	3
4	FW	(Georgia (country))	12	Mate Vatsadze	1	2	0	0	3
4	DF	(Georgia (country))	40	Saba Khvadagiani	1	2	0	0	3
7	MF	(France)	8	Dominique Simon	2	0	0	0	2
7	FW	(Austria)	24	Dominik Reiter	2	0	0	0	2
7	FW	(Georgia (country))	25	Nikoloz Tshekladze	0	1	1	0	2
7				Own goal	2	0	0	0	2
11	MF	(Georgia (country))	17	Nika Sikharulashvili	1	0	0	0	1
11	MF	(Lithuania)	13	Daniel Romanovskij	1	0	0	0	1
11	FW	(Georgia (country))	9	Jaduli Iobashvili	1	0	0	0	1
11	MF	(Georgia (country))	23	Giorgi Moistsrapishvili	1	0	0	0	1
11	MF	(Georgia (country))	22	Nika Ninua	1	0	0	0	1
11	DF	(Georgia (country))	3	Aleksandre Kalandadze	1	0	0	0	1
11	DF	(Georgia (country))	5	Solomon Kvirkvelia	1	0	0	0	1
11	FW	(Georgia (country))	19	David Gotsiridze	0	1	0	0	1
11	MF	(Georgia (country))	30	Tornike Okriashvili	0	0	1	0	1
11	MF	(Georgia (country))	6	Nodar Lominadze	0	0	1	0	1
				TOTALS	33	6	3	2	44

=== Clean sheets ===
Place	Position	Nation	Number	Name	Erovnuli Liga	Georgian Cup	Super Cup	UEFA Conference League	Total
1	GK	(Georgia (country))	1	Giorgi Loria	7	0	0	0	7
1	GK	(Georgia (country))	37	Mikheil Makatsaria	4	2	1	0	7
				TOTALS	11	2	1	0	14

=== Disciplinary record ===
Number	Nation	Position	Name	Erovnuli Liga		Georgian Cup		Super Cup		UEFA Conference League		Total	
Number	Nation	Position	Name	Yellow card	Red card	Yellow card	Red card	Yellow card	Red card	Yellow card	Red card	Yellow card	Red card
2	(Ghana)	DF	Benson Anang	0	0	1	0	0	0	0	0	1	0
3	(Georgia (country))	DF	Aleksandre Kalandadze	11	2	1	0	1	0	1	0	14	2
5	(Georgia (country))	DF	Solomon Kvirkvelia	3	0	0	0	0	0	0	0	3	0
6	(Georgia (country))	MF	Giorgi Tskhlitadze	1	0	0	0	0	0	0	0	1	0
7	(Georgia (country))	FW	Vakhtang Salia	3	0	0	0	0	0	0	0	3	0
9	(Georgia (country))	FW	Jaduli Iobashvili	2	0	0	0	0	0	0	0	2	0
11	(Georgia (country))	MF	Saba Samushia	3	0	0	0	0	0	0	0	3	0
12	(Georgia (country))	FW	Mate Vatsadze	1	1	0	0	0	0	0	0	1	1
16	(Georgia (country))	MF	Levan Osikmashvili	3	0	1	0	0	0	0	0	4	0
17	(Nigeria)	MF	Nosa Edokpolor	2	0	0	0	0	0	0	0	2	0
18	(Guatemala)	MF	Oscar Santis	5	1	0	0	0	0	0	0	5	1
19	(Georgia (country))	FW	David Gotsiridze	3	0	0	0	0	0	0	0	3	0
22	(Georgia (country))	MF	Nika Ninua	3	0	1	0	0	0	0	0	4	0
25	(Georgia (country))	FW	Nikoloz Tshekladze	1	0	0	0	0	0	0	0	1	0
27	(Georgia (country))	MF	Nikoloz Ugrekhelidze	8	0	1	0	2	0	1	1	12	1
28	(Georgia (country))	MF	Tsotne Berelidze	7	0	1	0	0	0	0	0	8	0
37	(Georgia (country))	GK	Mikheil Makatsaria	1	0	0	0	0	0	0	0	1	0
38	(Georgia (country))	DF	Saba Kharebashvili	3	1	1	0	0	0	0	0	4	1
40	(Georgia (country))	DF	Saba Khvadagiani	5	0	0	0	0	0	1	0	6	0
Players away on loan:
6	(Georgia (country))	MF	Nodar Lominadze	4	0	0	0	0	0	1	0	5	0
14	(Tajikistan)	MF	Alisher Shukurov	1	0	0	0	0	0	0	0	1	0
17	(Georgia (country))	MF	Nika Sikharulashvili	2	0	0	0	0	0	0	0	2	0
Players who left Dinamo Tbilisi during the season:
1	(Georgia (country))	GK	Giorgi Loria	0	1	0	0	0	0	0	0	0	1
8	(France)	MF	Dominique Simon	6	0	0	0	0	0	1	0	7	0
13	(Lithuania)	MF	Daniel Romanovskij	1	0	0	0	0	0	0	0	1	0
21	(Spain)	DF	Cadete	6	1	0	0	1	0	0	0	7	1
23	(Georgia (country))	MF	Giorgi Moistsrapishvili	1	0	0	0	0	0	1	0	2	0
31	(Georgia (country))	DF	Giorgi Maisuradze	6	1	0	0	0	0	0	0	6	1
40	(Nigeria)	DF	Joshua Akpudje	4	1	0	0	0	0	0	0	4	1
			TOTALS	97	9	7	0	4	0	6	1	114	10
