= 2024 Georgian Cup =

Davit Kipiani Cup
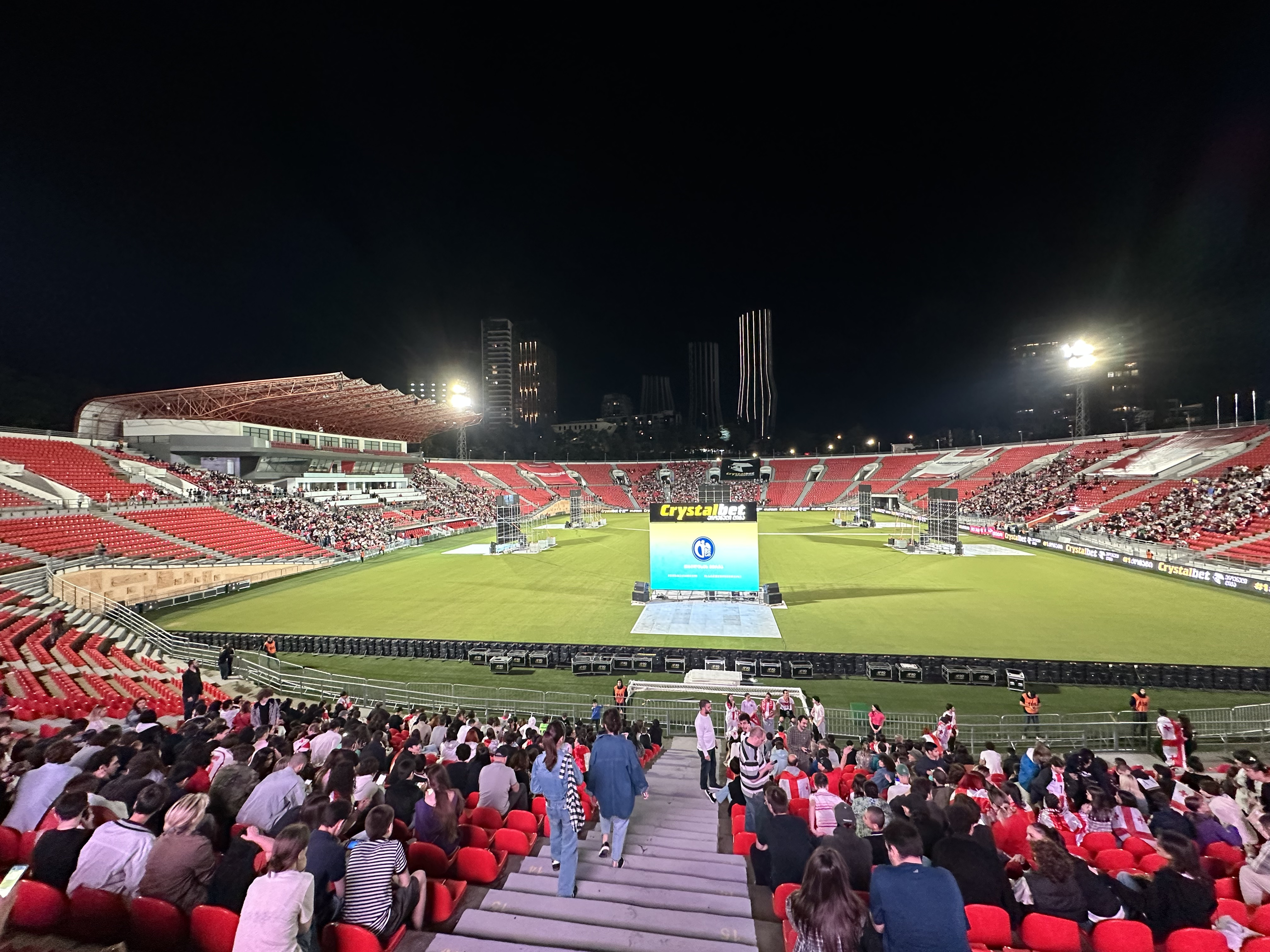
- Mikheil Meskhi Stadium hosted the final on 5 December 2024

Tournament details
- Country: Georgia
- Dates: 27 April – 5 December
- Teams: 52

Final positions
- Champions: Spaeri
- Runners-up: Dinamo Tbilisi

Tournament statistics
- Matches played: 52
- Goals scored: 209 (4.02 per match)

The 2024 Georgian Cup was a single knock-out football tournament, organized by the Georgian Football Federation. The winner qualified for the first round of the 2025–26 UEFA Conference League season.

Saburtalo, currently known as Iberia 1999, are the most recent title holders, having beaten Dinamo Batumi in the 2023 Cup final with an injury-time winner. They were eliminated by Dinamo Tbilisi in the round of 16.

== Preliminary round ==
Both matches of this round were played on 27 April. Amateurish Master League winners Bridge made a debut in the cup competition.

Team 1	Score	Team 2
27 April 2024
Bridge	5–3	UG 35 (5)
Kolkheti-2 (5)	4–0	Zana (4)

== First round ==
The draw for this round, which features 28 more teams of tiers 3 and 4, was held on 29 April. Liga 4 club Samgurali-2 were granted a bye for the 2nd round.

Team 1	Score	Team 2
12 May 2024
Matchakhela (3)	2–4	Merani Martvili (3)
Borjomi (3)	4–1	Guria (3)
13 May 2024
Varketili-2 (4)	6–3	Merani-2 Martvili (4)
Chikhura (4)	1–4	Locomotive-2 (3)
Margveti 2006 (4)	3–2 (a.e.t.)	Mertskhali (4)
Odishi 1919 (4)	6–0	Merani-2 Tbilisi (4)
Sulori (4)	1–3	Merani Tbilisi (3)
Gonio (3)	2–0	Gori (3)
Skuri (4)	0–3	Zestaponi (3)
Kolkheti-2	4–0	Algeti (4)
WIT Georgia-2 (4)	3–2	Gagra-2 (4)
Iberia-2 (3)	2–1	Betlemi (3)
Meshakhte (3)	3–0	Bakhmaro (3)
Orbi (3)	6–1	Gardabani (3)
14 May 2024
Bridge	2–1	Varketili (3)

== Second Round ==
Team 1	Score	Team 2
9 June 2024
Borjomi	3–2 (a.e.t.)	Zestaponi
10 June 2024
Margveti 2006	0–3	Merani Tbilisi
Meshakhte	2–1	Iberia-2
Kolkheti-2	4–1	WIT Georgia-2
Odishi 1919	1–5	Gonio
Locomotive-2	4–1	Merani Martvili
Varketili-2	1–5	Samgurali-2
Bridge	2–5	Orbi

== Third Round ==
At this stage six teams from the top tier and all ten teams of the 2nd division joined the competition.

The draw held on 7 June paired the following teams:

Team 1	Score	Team 2
20 July 2024
Borjomi	0–6	Locomotive (2)
Sioni (2)	1–4	Samgurali (1)
Kolkheti Khobi (2)	1–2	Spaeri (2)
Merani Tbilisi	0–3	Kolkheti 1913 (1)
Gonio	2–3	Rustavi (2)
21 July 2024
Kolkheti-2	0–1	Dinamo Tbilisi-2 (2)
Gareji (2)	2–1	Dila (1)
WIT Georgia (2)	0–1	Telavi (1)
Samgurali-2	0–2	Gagra (1)
Locomotive-2	3–3 (a.e.t.) (5–3 p)	Shturmi (2)
Orbi	1–1 (a.e.t.) (1–4 p)	Meshakhte
Aragvi (2)	0–2	Samtredia (1)

== Round of 16 ==
Last four teams from tier 1 participating in 2024–25 UEFA European campaign entered the contest in this round. The draw took place on 21 July.

Team 1	Score	Team 2
27 July 2024
Locomotive	0–0 (a.e.t.) (3–5 p)	Telavi
Gareji	5–0	Samtredia
Samgurali	0–0 (a.e.t.) (7–8 p)	Gagra
28 July 2024
Rustavi	2–3	Kolkheti 1913
Iberia 1999	1–2	Dinamo Tbilisi
Locomotive-2	0–1	Spaeri
Dinamo Tbilisi-2	4–0	Torpedo Kutaisi
14 August 2024
Meshakhte	1–2	Dinamo Batumi

== Quarter-finals ==
The draw for quarterfinals was held on 6 August.

Team 1	Score	Team 2
18 September 2024
Gareji	1–2 (a.e.t.)	Kolkheti 1913
Spaeri	4–3	Telavi
19 September 2024
Dinamo Tbilisi	1–0	Dinamo Batumi
22 October 2024
Dinamo Tbilisi-2	0–3	Gagra

== Semi-finals ==
The draw for the semifinal ties took place on 23 October. At this event, a venue and date for the final match were announced as well.

Team 1	Score	Team 2
5 November 2024
Dinamo Tbilisi	1–0	Kolkheti 1913
Spaeri	2–2 (a.e.t.) (5–4 p)	Gagra

== Final ==
5 December 2024
19:00 GET

Spaeri	2–2 (a.e.t.)	Dinamo Tbilisi
G. D. Tsetskhladze 45+1'; Gegiadze 89'		Vatsadze 65'; Khvadagiani 69'
Penalties
Chagunava (penalty scored); Samkharadze (penalty scored); Kentchadze (penalty missed); Bunturi (penalty scored); Gegiadze (penalty scored); Barabadze (penalty scored)	5–4	(penalty missed) Osikmashvili; (penalty scored) Salia; (penalty scored) Kharebashvili; (penalty scored) Khvadagiani; (penalty scored) Vatsadze; (penalty missed) Ugrekhelidze

Mikheil Meskhi Stadium, Tbilisi
Referee: Aleko Aptsiauri
