= Giorgi Maisuradze (footballer, born 2002) =

Georgian footballer (born 2002)

Personal information
- Date of birth: 31 January 2002 (age 24)
- Place of birth: Tbilisi, Georgia
- Height: 1.90 m (6 ft 3 in)
- Position: Defender

Team information
- Current team: Polissya Zhytomyr
- Number: 31

Youth career
- 2012–2020: Dinamo Tbilisi

Senior career*
Years	Team	Apps	(Gls)
2021–2024	Dinamo Tbilisi	51	(2)
2023	Dinamo Tbilisi-2	2	(0)
2025–	Polissya Zhytomyr	28	(1)

International career^{‡}
2023–2025	Georgia U21	19	(0)
2026–	Georgia	1	(0)
- * Club domestic league appearances and goals as of 24 May 2026 ‡ National team caps and goals as of 18 November 2026

Giorgi Maisuradze (Georgian: გიორგი მაისურაძე; born 31 January 2002) is a Georgian professional footballer who plays as a right-back for Ukrainian Premier League club Polissya Zhytomyr and the Georgia national team.

He has won the Erovnuli Liga and Supercup and represented his country in the national U21 team.

== Club career ==
Maisuradze joined Dinamo Tbilisi at the age of 10 and went through all age groups, becoming a champion of the national U15, U17 and U19 leagues. He made his debut for the senior team in a 2–1 win over Saburtalo on 8 August 2021. Maisuradze made 12 appearances for Dinamo the next year when they won the league, shortly followed by a Supercup title.

Maisuradze had far more playing time in 2023. Apart from taking part in 25 league games, he also featured for the reserve team in the 2nd division and made his debut in UEFA competitions.

In June 2024, Maisuradze concluded his uninterrupted twelve-year stay at Dinamo Tbilisi and moved to Ukrainian Premier League club Polyssia on a four-year deal for a fee of €400,000. On 10 April 2026, he scored his first Ukrainian goal in a 4–0 win over SC Poltava.

== International career ==
Maisuradze was called up to the national U21s for a friendly tie against Estonia in March 2022.

After the team started its 2025 UEFA European Championship qualifying round in September 2023, Maisuradze established himself as a regular player. He contributed to Georgia's successful campaign with nine appearances, including in two-legged play-offs against Croatia, which paved the way for the final stage of the championship.

Maisuradze shone in the starting match of the 2025 Euro Under-21 against Poland. He provided an assist for an injury-time winner and received the Player of the Match award.

== Career statistics ==
As of 24 May 2026

Appearances and goals by club, season and competition
Club	Season	League			National cup		European		Other		Total	
Club	Season	Division	Apps	Goals	Apps	Goals	Apps	Goals	Apps	Goals	Apps	Goals
Dinamo Tbilisi	2021	Erovnuli Liga	1	0	—		—		—		1	0
Dinamo Tbilisi	2022	Erovnuli Liga	12	0	2	0	—		—		14	0
Dinamo Tbilisi	2023	Erovnuli Liga	25	2	2	0	4 (Note: Two appearances in UEFA Champions League qualifiers and two appearances in UEFA Conference League qualifiers)	0	2 (Note: Appearances in Georgian Super Cup)	0	33	2
Dinamo Tbilisi	2024	Erovnuli Liga	13	0	—		—		—		13	0
Dinamo Tbilisi	Total		51	2	4	0	4	0	2	0	61	2
Dinamo Tbilisi-2	2021	Liga 4	—		2	0	—		—		2	0
Dinamo Tbilisi-2	2022	Liga 3	—		1	0	—		—		1	0
Dinamo Tbilisi-2	2023	Erovnuli Liga 2	2	0	—		—		—		2	0
Dinamo Tbilisi-2	Total		2	0	3	0	0	0	0	0	5	0
Polissya Zhytomyr	2024–25	Ukrainian Premier League	16	0	1	0	1 (Note: Appearance in UEFA Conference League)	0	—		18	0
Polissya Zhytomyr	2025–26	Ukrainian Premier League	12	1	—		—		—		12	1
Polissya Zhytomyr	Total		28	1	1	0	1	0	0	0	30	1
Career total			81	3	8	0	5	0	2	0	96	3

=== International ===
As of match played 17 November 2026

Appearances and goals by national team and year
National team	Year	Apps	Goals
Georgia	2026	1	0
Total		1	0

== Honours ==
Dinamo Tbilisi

- Erovnuli Liga: 2020, 2022
- Georgian Super Cup: 2021, 2023
