= 2023–24 SC Rheindorf Altach season =

SC Rheindorf Altach
2023–24 season
- Manager: Joachim Standfest
- Stadium: Stadion Schnabelholz
- Austrian Football Bundesliga: 9th
- Austrian Cup: Quarter-finals
- Top goalscorer: League: Mike-Steven Bähre (5 goals); All: Mike-Steven Bähre; Gustavo (5 each)

The 2023–24 SC Rheindorf Altach season is the club's 95th season in existence and its 10th consecutive season in the top flight of Austrian football. In addition to the domestic league, SC Rheindorf Altach participated in this season's edition of the Austrian Cup. The season covers the period from 1 July 2023 to 30 June 2024.

== Players ==
=== First-team squad ===
As of 27 September 2023

Note: Flags indicate national team as defined under FIFA eligibility rules; some limited exceptions apply. Players may hold more than one non-FIFA nationality.

No.	Pos.	Nation	Player
1	GK	MKD	Dejan Stojanović
4	DF	AUT	Felix Strauß
5	DF	AUT	Lukas Gugganig
6	DF	AUT	Constantin Reiner (on loan from Piast Gliwice)
7	FW	AUT	Noah Bischof
8	MF	GER	Mike-Steven Bähre
9	FW	KOS	Atdhe Nuhiu
10	MF	AUT	Dominik Reiter
11	FW	HUN	Csaba Bukta
12	DF	AUT	Leonardo Lukačević
13	MF	CMR	Djawal Kaiba
15	DF	AUT	Paul Koller
17	DF	AUT	Nosa Iyobosa Edokpolor
18	DF	AUT	Jan Zwischenbrugger

No.	Pos.	Nation	Player
19	DF	AUT	Sebastian Aigner
20	FW	BRA	Gustavo
21	FW	AUT	Damian Maksimovic
22	FW	AUT	Amir Abdijanovic
23	MF	AUT	Lukas Jäger (captain)
24	MF	AUT	Manuel Prietl
25	DF	AUT	Sandro Ingolitsch
27	MF	AUT	Christian Gebauer
28	MF	CRO	Jan Jurčec
29	DF	BFA	Mohamed Ouédraogo
30	MF	AUT	Lukas Fadinger
31	GK	AUT	Alexander Eckmayr
32	GK	AUT	Tobias Schützenauer
33	GK	AUT	Paul Piffer

=== Out on loan ===
Note: Flags indicate national team as defined under FIFA eligibility rules; some limited exceptions apply. Players may hold more than one non-FIFA nationality.

No. / Pos. / Nation / Player; — / GK / AUT / Jakob Odehnal (at Dornbirn until 30 June 2024)	No. / Pos. / Nation / Player; — / DF / AUT / Samuel Mischitz (at Dornbirn until 30 June 2024)

== Transfers ==
=== In ===
Pos.	Player	Transferred from	Fee	Date	Source

=== Out ===
Pos.	Player	Transferred to	Fee	Date	Source

== Pre-season and friendlies ==
Win Draw Loss Fixtures

12 October 2023 Friendly	Rheindorf Altach (Austria)	2–1	(Austria) FC Dornbirn
15:00

16 November 2023 Friendly	Rheindorf Altach (Austria)	2–1	(Liechtenstein) FC Vaduz
14:30

== Competitions ==
=== Overview ===
Competition	First match	Last match	Starting round	Record							
Competition	First match	Last match	Starting round	Pld	W	D	L	GF	GA	GD	Win %
Austrian Football Bundesliga	July 2023	May 2024	Matchday 1	0	0	0	0	0	0	+0	—
Austrian Cup	22 July 2023		First round	0	0	0	0	0	0	+0	—
Total				0	0	0	0	0	0	+0	—

Last updated: 9 December 2023
Source: Soccerway

=== Austrian Football Bundesliga ===
==== League table ====
Pos	Team	Pld	W	D	L	GF	GA	GD	Pts	Qualification
7	Austria Wien	22	9	6	7	25	22	+3	33 (Note: Head to head points: Rapid 4, Austria Wien 1.)	Qualification for the Relegation round
8	Wolfsberger AC	22	8	6	8	29	32	−3	30	Qualification for the Relegation round
9	SCR Altach	22	4	7	11	17	30	−13	19	Qualification for the Relegation round
10	Blau-Weiß Linz	22	4	7	11	22	38	−16	19	Qualification for the Relegation round
11	WSG Tirol	22	4	2	16	20	42	−22	14	Qualification for the Relegation round

Source: Austrian Football Bundesliga
Rules for classification: 1) Points; 2) Head-to-head record; 3) Goal difference; 4) Goals scored; 5) Matches won; 6) Away matches won; 7) Away goals scored.
Notes:

Pos	Team	Pld	W	D	L	GF	GA	GD	Pts	Qualification	STU	RBS	LASK	RWI	HAR	AKL
1	Sturm Graz (C)	32	19	10	3	56	23	+33	44	Qualification for the Champions League league stage	—	0–1	1–0	1–0	1–1	2–0
2	Red Bull Salzburg	32	20	7	5	74	29	+45	42	Qualification for the Champions League third qualifying round (Note: Since the Europa League winners, Atalanta qualified for the Champions League via league position, Red Bull Salzburg were promoted from the Champions League second qualifying round to the third qualifying round as one of the two teams with the highest coefficient in the second qualifying round.)	2–2	—	7–1	1–1	5–1	4–2
3	LASK	32	14	10	8	43	33	+10	34	Qualification for the Europa League play-off round (Note: The 2023–24 Austrian Cup winners qualified for the Europa League play-off round. Since the cup winners (Sturm Graz) qualified based on league position, the Europa League spot was passed to the third-placed team.)	2–2	3–1	—	5–0	1–3	1–0
4	Rapid Wien	32	11	12	9	47	35	+12	28	Qualification for the Europa League second qualifying round	1–3	2–0	0–0	—	0–3	1–1
5	Hartberg	32	12	9	11	49	52	−3	28	Qualification for the Conference League play-offs	1–3	1–5	1–2	0–3	—	3–2
6	Austria Klagenfurt	32	9	12	11	40	50	−10	22		0–4	4–3	0–2	0–1	2–2	—

Source: Austrian Football Bundesliga
Legend: Blue = home team win; Yellow = draw; Red = away team win.
Rules for classification: 1) Points; 2) Points with (possible) half points subtracted due to rounding; 3) Head-to-head points; 4) Head-to-head goal difference; 5) Head-to-head goals scored; 6) Goal difference; 7) Goals scored; 8) Matches won; 9) Away matches won; 10) Away goals scored.
(C) Champions
Notes:

Pos	Team	Pld	W	D	L	GF	GA	GD	Pts	Qualification	WOL	AWI	BWL	ALT	WAT	LUS
1	Wolfsberger AC	32	12	10	10	41	39	+2	31	Qualification for the Conference League play-offs	—	0–1	0–2	0–0	3–1	1–1
2	Austria Wien (O)	32	12	10	10	35	34	+1	29	Qualification for the Conference League play-offs	0–4	—	0–0	2–2	3–0	1–1
3	Blau-Weiß Linz	32	7	11	14	33	48	−15	22		0–0	1–2	—	2–1	3–2	0–0
4	Rheindorf Altach	32	6	13	13	27	40	−13	21		0–1	1–1	2–2	—	0–0	2–2
5	WSG Tirol	32	7	5	20	29	55	−26	19		1–1	1–0	2–1	0–1	—	0–0
6	Austria Lustenau (R)	32	4	9	19	22	58	−36	16	Relegation to Austrian Football Second League	1–2	2–0	1–0	0–1	1–2	—

Legend: Blue = home team win; Yellow = draw; Red = away team win.
Rules for classification: 1) Points; 2) Points with (possible) half points subtracted due to rounding; 3) Head-to-head points; 4) Head-to-head goal difference; 5) Head-to-head goals scored; 6) Head-to-head away goals scored; 7) Goal difference; 8) Goals scored; 9) Matches won; 10) Away matches won; 11) Away goals scored.
(O) Play-off winners; (R) Relegated

==== Results summary ====
Overall								Home						Away					
Pld	W	D	L	GF	GA	GD	Pts	W	D	L	GF	GA	GD	W	D	L	GF	GA	GD
0	0	0	0	0	0	0	0	0	0	0	0	0	0	0	0	0	0	0	0

Last updated: November 2023.

==== Results by round ====
Round	1
Ground	
Result	
Position	

Updated to match(es) played on November 2023. Source:
A = Away; H = Home; W = Win; D = Draw; L = Loss

==== Matches ====
The league fixtures were unveiled on 27 June 2023.

August 2023 1	v

=== Austrian Cup ===
The draw for the season's first round took place on 25 June.

21 July 2023 First round	FCM Flyeralarm Traiskirchen	v	Rheindorf Altach
