= Lado Odishvili =

Georgian footballer (born 2003)

Personal information
- Date of birth: 28 May 2003 (age 23)
- Place of birth: Georgia
- Position: Defender

Team information
- Current team: Telavi
- Number: 39

Youth career
- Locomotive

Senior career*
| Years | Team | Apps | (Gls) |
| 2021 | Locomotive-2 | | |
| 2022 | Vazisubani | | |
| 2023 | Ilanka Rzepin | | |
| 2024– | Telavi | 44 | (0) |

International career^{‡}
| 2021 | Georgia U19 | 1 | (0) |
| 2024 | Georgia U20 | 1 | (0) |
| 2024– | Georgia U21 | 4 | (0) |
- * Club domestic league appearances and goals as of 8 June 2025 ‡ National team caps and goals as of 8 June 2025

Lado Odishvili (Georgian: ლადო ოდიშვილი; born 28 May 2003) is a Georgian professional footballer who plays as a defender for Erovnuli Liga club Telavi.

== Club career ==
Odishvili is a product of Locomotive's youth academy. He played in U15 Golden League before being promoted to Locomotive-2.

In early March 2023, Polish IV liga side Ilanka Rzepin announced the signing of Odishvili. In his second game for the team, Odishvili scored in a 3–1 away win over Celuloza Kostrzyn nad Odrą, shortly followed by another two goals.

In February 2024, Odishvili was among eleven new players introduced by Erovnuli Liga club Telavi. He made his debut in the top tier against Iberia 1999 on 2 March 2024 and quickly established himself as a regular player, making 29 league appearances in his first season for the team.

== International career ==
Odishvili was first called up by coach Vasil Maisuradze to the national U19 team for two friendlies against Estonia in September 2021.

On 8 June 2024, Odishvili took part in a friendly U20 game against Kazakhtan, being the only Georgian footballer who played the entire match. Three months later, he joined the U21 team in its 2025 UEFA European Under-21 Championship qualifying campaign in September 2024. Odishvili made his first appearance for the team as a substitute against Netherlands on 9 September.

As the team qualified for the 2025 UEFA European Under-21 Championship following a dramatic play-off victory over Croatia, Odishvili was named in a 23-men squad by coach Ramaz Svanadze in June 2025.
