= 2021–22 SC Rheindorf Altach season =

SC Rheindorf Altach
2021–22 season
- Chairman: Werner Gunz
- Manager: Damir Canadi
- Stadium: Stadion Schnabelholz
- Austrian Football Bundesliga: 12th
- Austrian Cup: First round
| Home colours | Away colours |

The 2021–22 season was the 91st season of play of SC Rheindorf Altach and the club's tenth consecutive season in the top flight of Austrian football. In addition to the domestic league, SC Rheindorf Altach participated in the Austrian Cup.

== Players ==
=== First-team squad ===
As of 6 February 2022

Note: Flags indicate national team as defined under FIFA eligibility rules; some limited exceptions apply. Players may hold more than one non-FIFA nationality.

| No. | Pos. | Nation | Player |
|---|---|---|---|
| 1 | GK | AUT | Christoph Riegler |
| 3 | DF | AUT | Lukas Prokop |
| 4 | DF | AUT | Felix Strauß |
| 5 | DF | AUT | Philipp Netzer |
| 6 | DF | FRA | Pape-Alioune Ndiaye |
| 7 | FW | AUT | Christoph Monschein (on loan from LASK) |
| 8 | MF | AUT | Lukas Parger |
| 9 | FW | KOS | Atdhe Nuhiu |
| 10 | MF | AUT | Dominik Reiter |
| 11 | FW | AUT | Marco Meilinger |
| 12 | FW | AUT | Noah Bischof |
| 13 | GK | AUT | Tino Casali |
| 14 | MF | AUT | Samuel Mischitz |
| 16 | MF | AUT | Emanuel Schreiner |
| 17 | DF | AUT | Nosa Iyobosa Edokpolor |

| No. | Pos. | Nation | Player |
|---|---|---|---|
| 18 | DF | AUT | Jan Zwischenbrugger |
| 19 | DF | AUT | Sebastian Aigner |
| 20 | MF | AUT | Johannes Tartarotti |
| 21 | MF | AUT | Lars Nussbaumer |
| 24 | DF | AUT | David Bumberger |
| 27 | MF | AUT | Stefan Haudum |
| 29 | MF | AUT | Noah Bitsche |
| 30 | MF | CRO | Sandi Križman |
| 31 | GK | AUT | Armin Gremsl |
| 32 | GK | AUT | Jakob Odehnal |
| 33 | FW | HUN | Csaba Bukta |
| 34 | DF | AUT | Manuel Thurnwald |
| 37 | DF | FRA | Ange Nanizayamo (on loan from Lausanne) |
| 42 | MF | MLI | Bakary Nimaga |
| 55 | MF | GER | Gianluca Gaudino (on loan from SV Sandhausen) |

=== Out on loan ===
Note: Flags indicate national team as defined under FIFA eligibility rules; some limited exceptions apply. Players may hold more than one non-FIFA nationality.

| No. | Pos. | Nation | Player |
|---|---|---|---|
| — | DF | AUT | Leo Mätzler (at Austria Lustenau until 30 June 2022) |
| — | MF | AUT | Ronny Rikal (at Dornbirn until 30 June 2022) |

| No. | Pos. | Nation | Player |
|---|---|---|---|
| — | MF | AUT | Thomas Baldauf (at Dornbirn until 30 June 2022) |
| — | FW | AUT | Amir Abdijanovic (at Dornbirn until 30 June 2022) |

== Pre-season and friendlies ==
Win Draw Loss Fixtures

== Competitions ==
=== Overall record ===
| Competition | First match | Last match | Starting round | Record | | | | | | | |
| Competition | First match | Last match | Starting round | Pld | W | D | L | GF | GA | GD | Win % |
|---|---|---|---|---|---|---|---|---|---|---|---|
| Austrian Football Bundesliga | 25 July 2021 | May 2022 | Matchday 1 | 29 | 5 | 7 | 17 | 18 | 47 | −29 | 17.24 |
| Austrian Cup | 17 July 2021 | | First round | 1 | 0 | 0 | 1 | 1 | 2 | −1 | 0.00 |
| Total | | | | 30 | 5 | 7 | 18 | 19 | 49 | −30 | 16.67 |

Last updated: 26 April 2022
Source: Soccerway

=== Austrian Football Bundesliga ===
==== League table ====
Austrian Bundesliga regular season table
| Pos | Team | Pld | W | D | L | GF | GA | GD | Pts | Qualification |
|---|---|---|---|---|---|---|---|---|---|---|
| 8 | LASK | 22 | 6 | 7 | 9 | 28 | 29 | −1 | 25 | Qualification for the Relegation round |
| 9 | WSG Tirol | 22 | 5 | 8 | 9 | 30 | 42 | −12 | 23 | Qualification for the Relegation round |
| 10 | Hartberg | 22 | 5 | 7 | 10 | 29 | 35 | −6 | 22 | Qualification for the Relegation round |
| 11 | Admira Wacker Mödling | 22 | 4 | 8 | 10 | 25 | 31 | −6 | 20 | Qualification for the Relegation round |
| 12 | Rheindorf Altach | 22 | 3 | 4 | 15 | 10 | 38 | −28 | 13 | Qualification for the Relegation round |

Source: Austrian Football Bundesliga
Rules for classification: 1) Points; 2) Head-to-head record; 3) Goal difference; 4) Goals scored; 5) Matches won; 6) Away matches won; 7) Away goals scored.

==== Results summary ====
| Overall | | | | | | | | Home | | | | | | Away | | | | | |
| Pld | W | D | L | GF | GA | GD | Pts | W | D | L | GF | GA | GD | W | D | L | GF | GA | GD |
|---|---|---|---|---|---|---|---|---|---|---|---|---|---|---|---|---|---|---|---|
| 4 | 0 | 2 | 2 | 4 | 10 | −6 | 2 | 0 | 1 | 1 | 3 | 6 | −3 | 0 | 1 | 1 | 1 | 4 | −3 |

Last updated: 14 August 2021.
Source: Austrian Football Bundesliga

==== Results by round ====
| Round | 1 | 2 | 3 | 4 |
|---|---|---|---|---|
| Ground | H | A | A | H |
| Result | L | W | | |
| Position | | | | |

Updated to match(es) played on 14 August 2021. Source: Austrian Football Bundesliga
A = Away; H = Home; W = Win; D = Draw; L = Loss

==== Matches ====
The league fixtures were announced on 22 June 2021.

| 24 July 2021 1 | Rheindorf Altach | 0–1 | LASK | Altach |
| 17:00 CEST (UTC+2) | | | | Stadium: Stadion Schnabelholz |

| 31 July 2021 2 | Hartberg | 1–2 | Rheindorf Altach | Hartberg |
| 17:00 CEST (UTC+2) | | | | Stadium: Profertil Arena Hartberg |

==== League table ====
Austrian Bundesliga relegation round table
| Pos | Team | Pld | W | D | L | GF | GA | GD | Pts | Qualification |
|---|---|---|---|---|---|---|---|---|---|---|
| 1 | WSG Tirol | 32 | 10 | 10 | 12 | 46 | 58 | −12 | 28 | Qualification for the Europa Conference League play-offs |
| 2 | LASK | 32 | 9 | 12 | 11 | 44 | 42 | +2 | 26 | Qualification for the Europa Conference League play-offs |
| 3 | Rheindorf Altach | 32 | 7 | 8 | 17 | 24 | 49 | −25 | 22 | |
| 4 | Ried | 32 | 8 | 13 | 11 | 40 | 54 | −14 | 22 | |
| 5 | Hartberg | 32 | 7 | 12 | 13 | 43 | 47 | −4 | 22 | |
| 6 | Admira Wacker Mödling (R) | 32 | 6 | 13 | 13 | 36 | 46 | −10 | 21 | Relegation to Austrian Football Second League |

Source: Austrian Bundesliga
Rules for classification: 1) Points; 2) Points with (possible) half points subtracted due to rounding; 3) Head-to-head points; 4) Head-to-head goal difference; 5) Head-to-head goals scored; 6) Head-to-head away goals scored; 7) Goal difference; 8) Goals scored; 9) Matches won; 10) Away matches won; 11) Away goals scored.
(R) Relegated

==== Results summary ====
| Overall | | | | | | | | Home | | | | | | Away | | | | | |
| Pld | W | D | L | GF | GA | GD | Pts | W | D | L | GF | GA | GD | W | D | L | GF | GA | GD |
|---|---|---|---|---|---|---|---|---|---|---|---|---|---|---|---|---|---|---|---|
| 0 | 0 | 0 | 0 | 0 | 0 | 0 | 0 | 0 | 0 | 0 | 0 | 0 | 0 | 0 | 0 | 0 | 0 | 0 | 0 |

Last updated: 26 April 2022.
Source: Austrian Football Bundesliga
