= Nosa Iyobosa Edokpolor =

Nigerian footballer (born 1996)

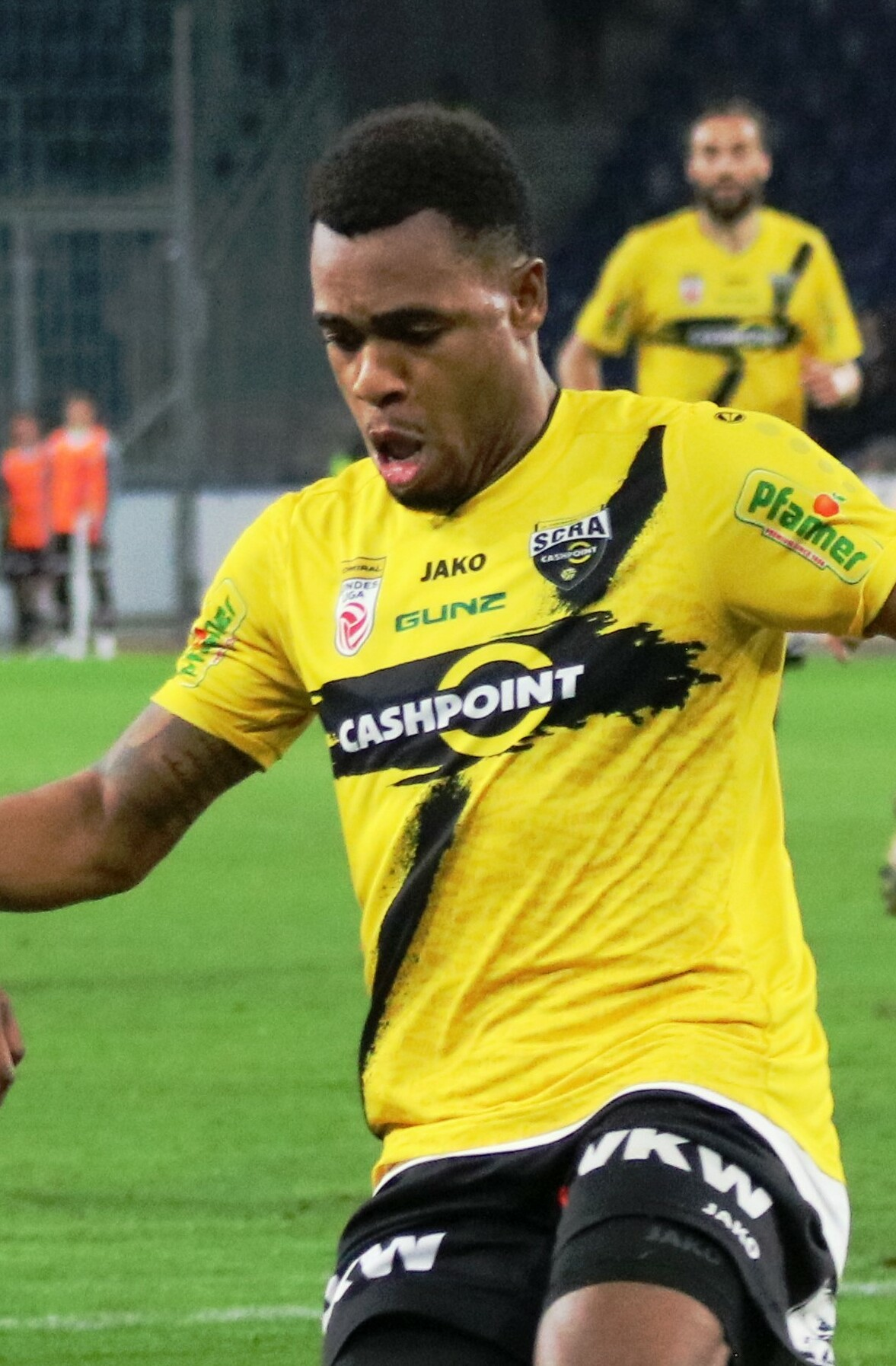
- Edokpolor in 2023

Personal information
- Date of birth: 22 September 1996 (age 30)
- Place of birth: Benin City, Nigeria
- Height: 1.78 m (5 ft 10 in)
- Position: Left-back

Team information
- Current team: Kauno Žalgiris
- Number: 37

Youth career
- 2004–2006: SV Glanegg
- 2006–2012: FC St. Veit
- 2014–2015: → Palermo (loan)

Senior career*
Years	Team	Apps	(Gls)
2012–2015	FC St. Veit	46	(1)
2015–2016	Wolfsberger AC II	27	(0)
2016–2018	SV Horn	40	(1)
2018–2020	Blau-Weiß Linz	52	(2)
2020–2024	Rheindorf Altach	75	(0)
2021–2022	Rheindorf Altach II	3	(0)
2024	Dinamo Tbilisi	12	(0)
2025–	Kauno Žalgiris	50	(3)
- * Club domestic league appearances and goals as of 22 June 2026

Nosa Iyobosa Edokpolor (born 22 September 1996) is a Nigerian professional footballer who plays as a left-back for Toplyga club Kauno Žalgiris.

== Club career ==
=== Early career ===
Iyobosa Edokpolor began his career with SV Glanegg, before moving to the youth academy of FC St. Veit in 2006. In April 2012, he made his senior debut for the first team of St. Veit in the fourth-tier Kärntner Liga. In the 2011–12 season he made to a total of three league appearances. In the 2012–13 season, he made 15 appearances in the fourth division. In May 2014, he scored his first goal in a 5–2 defeat against SC Landskron.

Ahead of the 2014–15 season, Iyobosa Edokpolor moved to Italy, where he joined the youth setup of the Palermo on loan. Playing for the U19 team, he made six appearances in the Campionato Primavera.

=== Wolfsberger AC II ===
Ahead of the 2015–16 season, Iyobosa Edokpolor returned to Austria and moved to the third-tier second team of Wolfsberger AC. In July 2015, he made his debut in the Austrian Regionalliga against Annabichler SV. In the 2015–16 season he made 27 Regionalliga appearances, with the second team of the Carinthian side, who suffered relegation to the Landesliga at the end of the season.

=== SV Horn ===
In June 2016, Iyobosa Edokpolor signed a two-year contract with recently promoted 2. Liga club SV Horn. His debut in the second division followed in August 2016, when he came off the bench in injury time for Ferdinand Weinwurm on the sixth matchday of that season against SC Wiener Neustadt. By the end of the season, he had made ten appearances in the second division, from which he was relegated with Horn. After relegation, he scored his first Regionalliga goal in April 2018 in a 2–0 win against SC-ESV Parndorf. In the 2017–18 season, he was utilised in all 31 league games, as Horn were able to win promotion to the 2. Liga once again.

=== Blau-Weiß Linz ===
After regaining promotion with Horn, Iyobosa Edokpolor moved to league rivals Blau-Weiß Linz for the 2018–19 season. In October 2018, he scored his first goal in professional football in a 6–3 victory against Austria Wien II. In his first season with the team, he made 29 second division appearances. After a further 23 appearances in the 2019–20 season, his contract was terminated in July 2020 due to disciplinary problems. Iyobosa Edokpolor had previously refused a substitution against his former club Horn on matchday 26, and not showed up for team practice the following day.

=== Rheindorf Altach ===
On 10 July 2020, Edokpolor signed with Austrian Football Bundesliga club Rheindorf Altach. Following the expiration of his contract, he left Altach after the 2023–24 season. Over his four years at the club, he made 82 appearances.

=== Dinamo Tbilisi ===
In September 2024, Edokpolor signed with Georgian Erovnuli Liga club Dinamo Tbilisi, joining fellow Austrians, head coach Ferdinand Feldhofer and player Dominik Reiter. On 15 January 2025, Dinamo Tbilisi announced that Edokpolor had left the club after his contract had expired.

=== Kauno Žalgiris ===
On 4 February 2025, Lithuanian A Lyga club Kauno Žalgiris announced about agreement with Edokpolor.

== Career statistics ==
As of match played 8 November 2025

Appearances and goals by club, season and competition
Club	Season	League			National cup		Other		Total	
Club	Season	Division	Apps	Goals	Apps	Goals	Apps	Goals	Apps	Goals
FC St. Veit	2011–12	Kärntner Liga	3	0	0	0	—		3	0
FC St. Veit	2012–13	Kärntner Liga	15	0	0	0	—		15	0
FC St. Veit	2013–14	Kärntner Liga	28	1	1	0	—		29	1
FC St. Veit	Total		46	1	1	0	—		47	1
Wolfsberger AC II	2015–16	Regionalliga Central	27	0	—		—		27	0
SV Horn	2016–17	2. Liga	9	0	0	0	—		9	0
SV Horn	2017–18	Regionalliga East	31	1	1	0	—		32	1
SV Horn	Total		40	1	1	0	—		41	1
Blau-Weiß Linz	2018–19	2. Liga	29	1	1	0	—		30	1
Blau-Weiß Linz	2019–20	2. Liga	23	1	2	1	—		25	2
Blau-Weiß Linz	Total		52	2	3	1	—		55	3
Rheindorf Altach	2020–21	Austrian Bundesliga	20	0	2	0	—		22	0
Rheindorf Altach	2021–22	Austrian Bundesliga	20	0	0	0	—		20	0
Rheindorf Altach	2022–23	Austrian Bundesliga	26	0	2	0	—		28	0
Rheindorf Altach	2023–24	Austrian Bundesliga	9	0	3	0	—		12	0
Rheindorf Altach	Total		75	0	7	0	—		82	0
Rheindorf Altach II	2021–22	Vorarlbergliga	3	0	—		—		3	0
Dinamo Tbilisi	2024	Erovnuli Liga	12	0	2	0	—		14	0
Kauno Žalgiris	2025	A Lyga	33	2	1	0	6 (Note: Appearances in UEFA Conference League)	0	40	2
Career total			288	6	15	1	6	0	309	7

== Honours ==
Kauno Žalgiris

- Toplyga: 2025, 2026
- Lithuanian Cup: 2026
- Lithuanian Supercup: 2026
