= Vasilios Gordeziani =

Georgian footballer

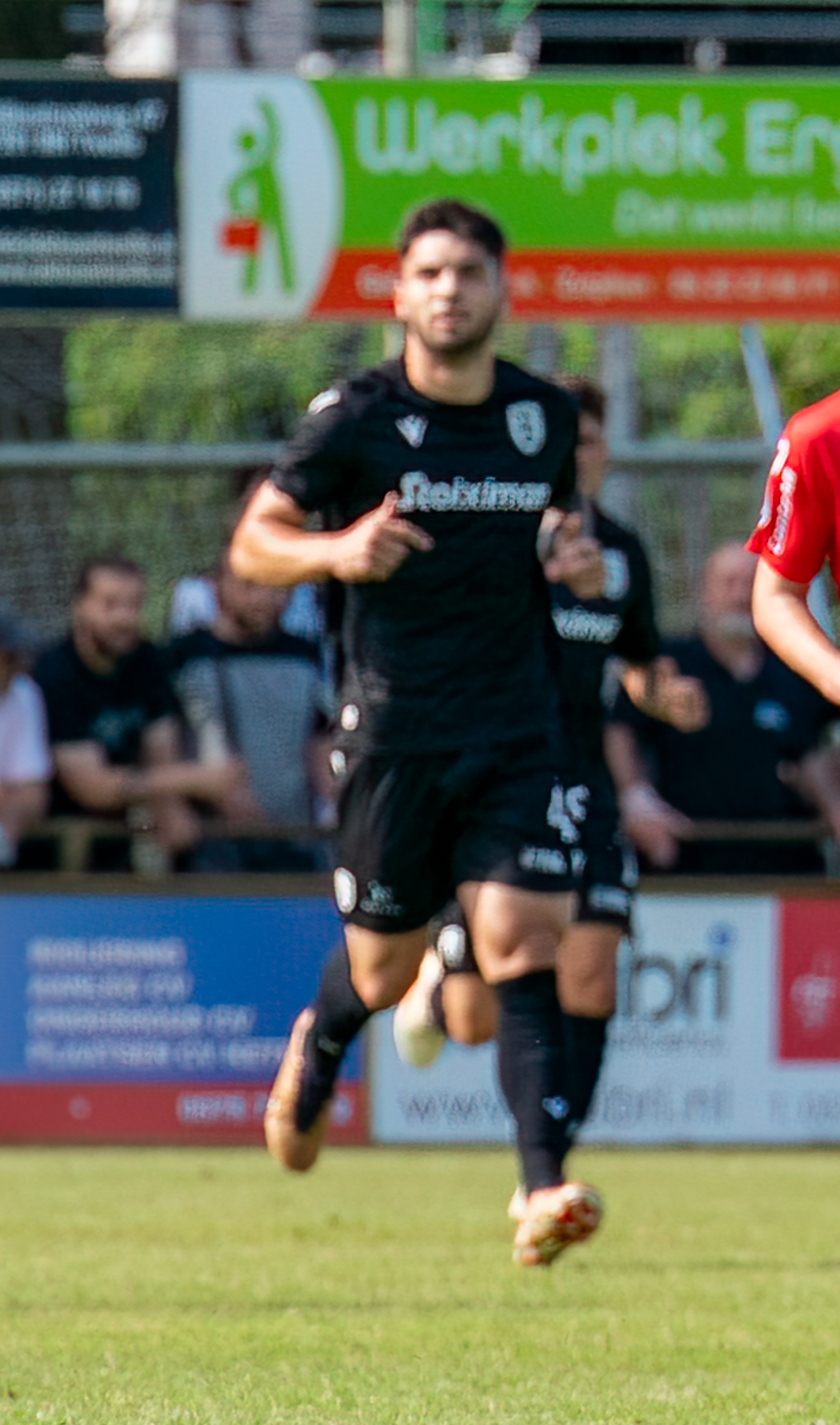
- Gordeziani with PAOK in 2023

Personal information
- Date of birth: 29 January 2002 (age 24)
- Place of birth: Georgia
- Height: 1.88 m (6 ft 2 in)
- Position: Forward

Team information
- Current team: Panthrakikos
- Number: 46

Youth career
- 2014–2021: PAOK

Senior career*
Years	Team	Apps	(Gls)
2021–2024	PAOK B	45	(11)
2022–2024	PAOK	2	(0)
2024–2026	Dinamo Tbilisi	31	(6)
2025	→ Sarajevo (loan)	11	(2)
2026	Hellas Syros	11	(3)
2026–	Panthrakikos	0	(0)

International career^{‡}
2023–2025	Georgia U21	14	(3)
- * Club domestic league appearances and goals as of 19 April 2026 ‡ National team caps and goals as of 14 June 2025

Vasilios Gordeziani (Greek: Βασίλειος Γκορντεζιάνι; Georgian: ვასილიოს გორდეზიანი; born 29 January 2002) is a professional footballer who plays as a forward for Greek Super League 2 club Panthrakikos. Raised in Greece, he represents Georgia at youth level.

== Early life ==
Born in Georgia to a Georgian father and Greek mother, Gordeziani was nearly a one-year-old, when his family relocated to Greece. He started playing football at the age of five.

== Club career ==
Vasilios Gordeziani joined PAOK in 2014 and every year improved dramatically. He was a title-winner with the Under-15s and of course with the Under-19s. Although promoted to the first team, Gordeziani mostly played for the reserve team in the 2nd division.

In March 2024, Gordeziani signed a two-year deal with Erovnuli Liga runners-up Dinamo Tbilisi and finished this season as a joint topscorer of the team along with Mate Vatsadze and Vakhtang Salia. On 3 February 2025, he was loaned to Sarajevo until the end of the season.

== International career ==
Gordeziani received the citizenship of Georgia in August 2023, which enabled coach Ramaz Svanadze to call him up for upcoming matches of their 2025 UEFA European Under-21 Championship qualification campaign. He scored in the very first game for the team in a 2–0 win over Gibraltar on 6 September 2023.

Gordeziani is a participant of the 2025 UEFA European Under-21 Championship. He netted a stoppage-time winner in Georgia's opening match against Poland on 11 June 2025.

== Career statistics ==
=== Club ===
As of match played 31 May 2025

Appearances and goals by club, season and competition
Club	Season	League			National cup (Note: Includes Georgian Cup, Bosnia and Herzegovina Cup)		Other		Total	
Club	Season	Division	Apps	Goals	Apps	Goals	Apps	Goals	Apps	Goals
PAOK B	2021–22	Super League Greece 2	21	3	—		—		21	3
PAOK B	2022–23	Super League Greece 2	18	5	—		—		18	5
PAOK B	2023–24	Super League Greece 2	6	3	—		—		6	3
PAOK B	Total		45	11	—		—		45	11
PAOK	2022–23	Super League Greece	2	0	—		—		2	0
Dinamo Tbilisi	2024	Erovnuli Liga	23	6	3	0	1 (Note: Appearance in Georgian Super Cup)	0	27	6
Sarajevo (loan)	2024–25	Bosnian Premier League	11	2	2	0	—		13	2
Career total			81	19	5	0	1	0	87	19

== Personal life ==
In September 2025, Gordeziani and his Greek girlfriend Tenia Manousaki welcomed their first child, a son.

== Honours ==
Sarajevo

- Bosnian Cup: 2024–25
