= Georgian U-17 Liga =

- Organising body: Georgian Football Federation
- Founded: 2016; 10 years ago
- Country: Georgia
- Number of clubs: 10
- Level on pyramid: 1 (of under-17 age group)
- Current champions: Iberia 1999 (2025)
- Most championships: Dinamo Tbilisi (5 titles)
- Website: gff.ge

The U17 Golden League (Georgian: 17 წლამდელთა ოქროს ლიგა) is the main youth football competition run by the Georgian Football Federation for under-17 teams, whose parent clubs usually compete in the Erovnuli Liga or lower leagues.

Created in mid-2016, it is named after distinguished player Mikheil Meskhi and currently consists of eleven teams.

== Structure and format ==
A playing season of the league consists of two parts. During the first phase, teams play Double round robin. The top five teams qualify for Championship group which determines the winner via an eight-game tournament. The remaining clubs take part in Relegation round with the bottom team to be relegated to the Silver League, which is the 2nd division, contested by ten teams as of 2025.

Seasons run based on Spring-Autumn system.

== History ==
The U17 competition started in 2016. Based on geographic principle, 27 teams were initially divided into four groups. Their winners, runners-up and two best three-placed teams then formed a ten-member Championship group. Locomotive became the first champions after a 4–1 victory over Saburtalo in the final match of the season.

Starting from 2019, Dinamo Tbilisi have been represented in the league with two teams. Twice in a row in the early 2020s, Dinamo-2 even surpassed the main team, becoming champions in 2022. A year later, Saburtalo also doubled their representation.

The 2020 league season was abandoned after seven rounds following a COVID-19 outbreak. The latter also affected the next season which was completed in July 2022 only. Iberia 1999 have dominated during the recent period, securing four out of five league titles.

== Current teams ==
There are currently ten teams competing in U19 Golden League:

- Dinamo Tbilisi
- Dinamo Tbilisi-2
- Iberia 1999
- Iberia-2 1999
- Inter
- Inter-2
- Locomotive
- Torpedo
- WIT Georgia
- 35th Football School

== Seasons ==
Season	Champion	Runner-up	Third place
2016	Locomotive	Saburtalo	
2017	Dinamo Tbilisi	Locomotive	
2018	Dinamo Tbilisi	Saburtalo	Locomotive
2019	Dinamo Tbilisi	Saburtalo	Dinamo Tbilisi-2
2020	Abandoned due to COVID-19 pandemic		
2021	Saburtalo	Dinamo Tbilisi-2	Dinamo Tbilisi
2022	Dinamo Tbilisi-2	Saburtalo	Dinamo Tbilisi
2023	Saburtalo	Dinamo Tbilisi	35th Football School
2024	Iberia 1999	Dinamo Tbilisi	Dinamo Tbilisi-2
2025	Dinamo Tbilisi	Iberia 1999	Locomotive

Note: Saburtalo changed its name to Iberia 1999 in February 2024

== Player of the Year ==
Based on his individual performance in the Golden League, one notable U17 player is selected by the Football Federation each year.

Year	Player	Club
2017	Khvicha Kvaratskhelia	Dinamo Tbilisi
2018	Nika Talakhadze	Dinamo Tbilisi
2019	Luka Gagnidze	Dinamo Tbilisi
2020	Not awarded	
2021	Gabriel Sigua	Dinamo Tbilisi
2022	Soso Kopaliani	Locomotive
2023	Rezi Danelia	Dinamo Tbilisi
2024	Saba Kharebashvili	Dinamo Tbilisi
2025	Andria Bartishvili	Kolkheti 1913
