= Mohamed Ouédraogo =

Burkinabé footballer (born 2001)

Personal information
- Date of birth: 2 January 2003 (age 23)
- Place of birth: Burkina Faso
- Height: 1.83 m (6 ft 0 in)
- Position: Left-back

Team information
- Current team: Lyon
- Number: 76

Youth career
- Majestic FC

Senior career*
Years	Team	Apps	(Gls)
2020–2023	Majestic FC	53	(8)
2023–2024	Rheindorf Altach II	18	(2)
2024–2026	Rheindorf Altach	64	(5)
2026–	Lyon	1	(0)

International career^{‡}
2024–	Burkina Faso	9	(0)
- * Club domestic league appearances and goals as of 22 August 2026 ‡ National team caps and goals as of 22:01, 5 June 2026 (UTC)

Mohamed Ouédraogo (born 2 January 2003) is a Burkinabé professional footballer who plays as a left-back for Ligue 1 club Lyon and the Burkina Faso national team.

== Club career ==
Ouédraogo began his senior career in his native Burkina Faso with Majestic FC in 2020. In February 2023, he moved to the reserves of Rheindorf Altach. In June 2023, he signed a professional contract with Altach until 2026. He made his senior and professional debut with Rheindorf Altach in a 2–1 Austrian Cup loss to DSV Leoben on 3 February 2024.

On 3 July 2026, Ouédraogo signed a five-year contract with Lyon in France.

== International career ==
He made his debut with the Burkina Faso national team in a 1–1 friendly draw with Niger on 26 March 2024. He was called up to the national team for a set of 2026 FIFA World Cup qualification matches in June 2024.

== Career statistics ==
=== Club ===
As of match played 16 September 2026

Appearances and goals by club, season and competition
Club	Season	League			Cup		Europe		Other		Total	
Club	Season	Division	Apps	Goals	Apps	Goals	Apps	Goals	Apps	Goals	Apps	Goals
Majestic FC	2020–21	Burkinabé Premier League	9	1	—		—		—		9	1
Majestic FC	2021–22	Burkinabé Premier League	26	1	—		—		—		26	1
Majestic FC	2022–23	Burkinabé Premier League	18	6	—		—		—		18	6
Majestic FC	Total		53	8	—		—		—		53	8
Rheindorf Altach II	2022–23	Eliteliga Vorarlberg	6	1	—		—		—		6	1
Rheindorf Altach II	2023–24	Austrian Regionalliga West	11	1	—		—		—		11	1
Rheindorf Altach II	2024–25	Austrian Regionalliga West	1	0	—		—		—		1	0
Rheindorf Altach II	Total		18	2	—		—		—		18	2
Rheindorf Altach	2023–24	Austrian Bundesliga	15	1	1	0	—		—		16	1
Rheindorf Altach	2024–25	Austrian Bundesliga	20	0	1	0	—		—		21	0
Rheindorf Altach	2025–26	Austrian Bundesliga	29	4	6	0	—		—		35	4
Rheindorf Altach	Total		64	5	8	0	—		—		72	5
Lyon	2026–27	Ligue 1	1	0	0	0	4 (Note: Three appearances in UEFA Champions League, one appearance in UEFA Europa League)	0	—		5	0
Career total			136	15	8	0	4	0	0	0	148	15

=== International ===
As of match played 5 June 2026

Appearances and goals by national team and year
National team	Year	Apps	Goals
Burkina Faso	2024	6	0
Burkina Faso	2025	2	0
Burkina Faso	2026	1	0
Total		9	0
