= Georgian U-19 Liga =

- Organising body: Georgian Football Federation
- Founded: 2016; 10 years ago
- Country: Georgia
- Confederation: UEFA Youth League
- Number of clubs: 10
- Level on pyramid: 1 (of under-19 age group)
- Current champions: Dinamo Tbilisi (2025)
- Most championships: Dinamo Tbilisi (6 titles)
- Website: gff.ge

The U19 Golden League (Georgian: 19 წლამდელთა ოქროს ლიგა) is the main youth football competition run by the Georgian Football Federation for under-19 teams, whose parent clubs usually compete in the Erovnuli Liga or lower leagues.

Created in mid-2016, it is named after distinguished player Givi Chokheli and consists of as many teams as men's and women's leagues (10).

== Structure and format ==
A playing season of the league consists of two parts. During the first phase, teams play double round robin. The top five teams qualify for Championship group which determines the winner via an eight-game tournament. The remaining clubs take part in Relegation round with the bottom team to be relegated to the Silver League. The latter is the 2nd and last division of the youth league, contested by eleven teams in 2025.

Seasons run based on Spring-Autumn system.

== History ==
The eight-team league competition started on 22 August 2016, replacing the tournament held among the reserve teams. Based on geographic principle, it was initially divided into eastern and western groups with top two teams advancing to semifinals. Saburtalo became the first champions after a narrow victory over Dinamo Tbilisi.

In 2018, the league featured nine teams. Locomotive under head coach Suliko Davitashvili produced an unbeaten run, winning 25 out of 28 games and claimed the champions' title.

The 2020 league season was abandoned after three rounds following a COVID-19 outbreak. The latter affected the next season as well with the competition completed in June 2022. Dinamo have dominated during the recent period, securing four out of possible five titles.

== Current teams ==
There are currently ten teams competing in U19 Golden League.

- Dila
- Dinamo Batumi
- Dinamo Tbilisi
- Gagra
- Iberia 1999
- Inter
- Kolkheti 1913
- Locomotive
- Torpedo
- WIT Georgia

== Seasons ==
Season	Champion	Runner-up
2016	Saburtalo	Dinamo Tbilisi
2017	Dinamo Tbilisi	Locomotive
2018	Locomotive	Dinamo Tbilisi
2019	Dinamo Tbilisi	Locomotive
2020	Abandoned due to COVID-19 pandemic	
2021	Dinamo Tbilisi	Locomotive
2022	Saburtalo	Dinamo Tbilisi
2023	Dinamo Tbilisi	Saburtalo
2024	Dinamo Tbilisi	Iberia 1999
2025	Dinamo Tbilisi	Iberia 1999

Note: Saburtalo changed its name to Iberia 1999 in February 2024

== Player of the Year ==
Based on his individual performance in the Golden League, one U19 notable player is selected by the Football Federation each year.

Year	Player	Club
2017	Luka Lakvekheliani	Saburtalo
2018	Zuriko Davitashvili	Locomotive
2019	Giorgi Guliashvili	Saburtalo
2020	Not awarded	
2021	Saba Khvadagiani	Dinamo Tbilisi
2022	Luka Latsabidze	Dinamo Tbilisi
2023	Aleksandre Narimanidze	Saburtalo
2024	Saba Samushia	Dinamo Tbilisi
2025	Saba Kharebashvili	Dinamo Tbilisi
