= Nikoloz Ugrekhelidze =

Georgian footballer

Nikoloz "Nika" Ugrekhelidze
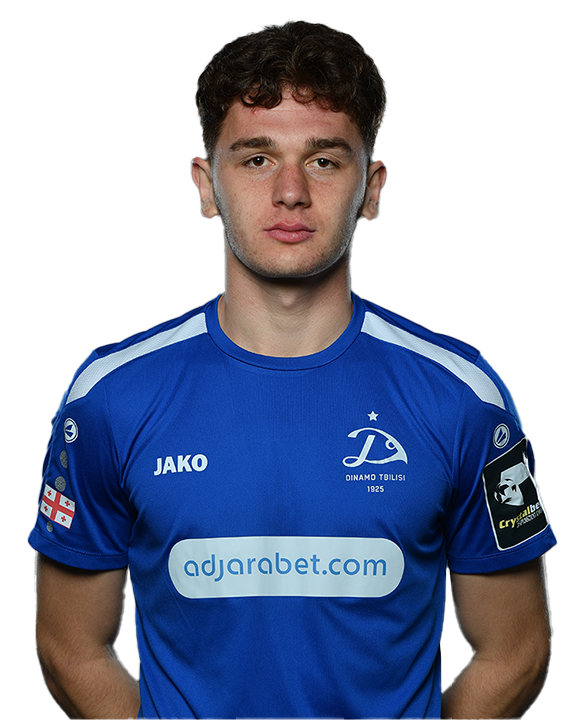

Personal information
- Date of birth: 15 August 2003 (age 23)
- Place of birth: Tbilisi, Georgia
- Height: 1.90 m (6 ft 3 in)
- Positions: Defender; defensive midfielder

Team information
- Current team: Dinamo Tbilisi
- Number: 4

Youth career
- Dinamo Tbilisi

Senior career*
Years	Team	Apps	(Gls)
2021–2022	Dinamo-2 Tbilisi	22	(5)
2023–	Dinamo Tbilisi	55	(6)
2025	→ Fatih Karagümrük (loan)	4	(0)

International career^{‡}
2020-2021	Georgia U17	7	(0)
2021-2022	Georgia U19	7	(0)
2023–2025	Georgia U21	9	(0)
- * Club domestic league appearances and goals as of 3 June 2026 ‡ National team caps and goals as of 2026

Nikoloz "Nika" Ugrekhelidze (Georgian: ნიკოლოზ " ნიკა" უგრეხელიძე; born 15 August 2003) is a Georgian footballer who plays as a defender or defensive midfielder for Erovnuli Liga club from Dinamo Tbilisi.

== Career ==
=== Club ===
Georgian footballer Nikoloz “Nika” Ugrekhelidze was born on August 15, 2003, in Tbilisi, Georgia. His football career began in the youth teams of Dinamo Tbilisi, and in 2021, he was promoted to Dinamo 2 Tbilisi. He played there for one season, and since 2023, he has been part of the main Dinamo Tbilisi team, a club known as a multiple-time champion of Erovnuli Liga and winner of the Georgian Cup. On a European scale, this club is also well-recognized. From 2020 to the present, he has played more than twenty matches for various teams in Georgia.

=== International ===
His first appearance for the Georgia U-17 national team was on October 13, 2019, against Ukraine U-17, where Georgia U-17 lost 0–2. Then there were two draws against Portugal U-17 and Albania U-17. In total, Nikoloz Ugrekhelidze played seven matches for the Georgia U-17 team without scoring any goals, playing as a central defender.

Later, he was called up to the Georgia U-19 team on June 10, 2021, for a match against Wales U-19, which ended in a draw. There were also matches against Kosovo U-19 and Norway U-19, where Georgia won both with the same score of 1–0. He then participated in games against Romania U-19 and Iceland U-19 with the U-19 team, helping his team advance through the qualification stages.

Nikoloz Ugrekhelidze received his first call-up to the Georgia U-21 national team in 2024 for a match against Turkey U-21 on March 22. In that game, Georgia lost to Turkey with a score of 2–1, and Nikoloz Ugrekhelidze played 45 minutes as a central defender. After that, there was a game against Gibraltar U-19, where he did not participate. In total, he played six matches in the starting lineup for the team: five times as a central defender and once as a defensive midfielder against Kazakhstan U-21, where he played 72 minutes. His last appearance in 2024 was on November 19 in a match against Croatia U-19 in Zagreb, where Georgia U-21 lost to Croatia U-21 with a score of 3–2. However, Georgia advanced to the 2025 UEFA European Under-21 Championship after a penalty shootout.

== Statistics ==
As of match played 1 November 2024

Appearances and goals by club, season and competition
Club	Season	League			Domestic Cup		Continental		Other		Total	
Club	Season	Division	Apps	Goals	Apps	Goals	Apps	Goals	Apps	Goals	Apps	Goals
Dinamo Tbilisi	2023	Erovnuli Liga	8	1	0	0	0 (Note: Appearance(s) in the UEFA Champions League and UEFA Conference League)	0	0 (Note: Appearance(s) in Georgian Super Cup)	0	0	0
Dinamo Tbilisi	2024	Erovnuli Liga	32	4	3	0	2 (Note: Appearance(s) and goal(s) in the UEFA Conference League)	0	2	2	0	0
Dinamo Tbilisi	Total		40	5	3	0	3	0	2	0	47	5
Career Total			40	5	3	0	3	0	2	0	47	5

== Honours ==
Dinamo Tbilisi

- Erovnuli Liga: 2023 Runner Up
- Georgian Super Cup: 2023 Runner Up
