= Saba Samushia =

Georgian footballer

Personal information
- Full name: Saba Samushia
- Date of birth: 7 November 2006 (age 20)
- Place of birth: Zugdidi, Georgia
- Height: 1.82 m (6 ft 0 in)
- Position: Winger

Team information
- Current team: Gimnàstic Manresa

Youth career
- –2024: Dinamo Tbilisi
- 2023–2024: → Anorthosis Famagusta (loan)

Senior career*
Years	Team	Apps	(Gls)
2023–2024	Dinamo Tbilisi-2	5	(0)
2024–2025	Dinamo Tbilisi	9	(0)
2025–2026	Rio Ave	0	(0)
2026–	Gimnàstic Manresa	0	(0)

International career^{‡}
2022	Georgia U17	1	(0)
2023–2025	Georgia U19	22	(4)
- * Club domestic league appearances and goals as of 1 July 2026 ‡ National team caps and goals as of 1 July 2026

Saba Samushia (Georgian: საბა სამუშია; born 7 November 2006) is a Georgian professional footballer who plays as a winger for Spanish club Gimnàstic Manresa. He is a youth international for Georgia.

== Club career ==
A youth product of Dinamo Tbilisi academy, Samushia made his senior debut with 2nd division club Dinamo Tbilisi-2 as a half-time substitute in a 3–2 home loss to Merani Martvili on 26 April 2023.

The next year, Samushia played for Dinamo's three teams. Apart from featuring for the reserve team, he also made a substantial impact on Dinamo's yet another triumph in the U19 League and made 13 appearances for the senior team, including on UEFA Conference League. At the end of this season, Samushia was selected by the Georgian Football Federation as U19 Player of the Year.

In February 2025, Samushia signed a professional contract with Rio Ave.

== International career ==
As a U17 team member, Samushia played a 2023 UEFA European Championship qualifying match against Israel before being called up to the U19s in November 2023. During the next 18 months, Samushia took part in two qualifying campaigns, making 11 appearances for the team.

== Statistics ==
Club	Season	League			National cup		Continental		Other		Total	
Club	Season	Division	Apps	Goals	Apps	Goals	Apps	Goals	Apps	Goals	Apps	Goals
Dinamo Tbilisi-2	2023	Erovnuli Liga 2	2	0	–		–		–		2	0
Dinamo Tbilisi-2	2024	Erovnuli Liga 2	3	0	–		–		–		3	0
Dinamo Tbilisi-2	Total		5	0	0	0	0	0	0	0	5	0
Dinamo Tbilisi	2024	Erovnuli Liga	9	0	1	0	2 (Note: Appearances in 2024–25 UEFA Conference League qualifiers)	0	1 (Note: Appearance in Georgian Super Cup)	0	13	0
Career total			14	0	1	0	2	0	1	0	18	0

== Honours ==
- U19 Player of the Year: 2024
