= Dominique Simon =

Haitian footballer (born 2000)

Personal information
- Full name: Dominique Célidor Simon
- Date of birth: 29 July 2000 (age 26)
- Place of birth: Pontoise, France
- Height: 1.79 m (5 ft 10 in)
- Position: Defensive midfielder

Team information
- Current team: Hatta

Youth career
- 2006–2018: Paris Saint-Germain
- 2018–2019: Aubervilliers

Senior career*
Years	Team	Apps	(Gls)
2019–2020	Aubervilliers	1	(0)
2021–2022	Navarro	5	(2)
2022–2023	Paide U21	8	(0)
2022–2024	Paide	49	(3)
2024	Dinamo Tbilisi	15	(2)
2024–2026	Pardubice	16	(1)
2025–2026	→ Tatran Prešov (loan)	20	(1)
2026–	Hatta	0	(0)

International career^{‡}
2026–	Haiti	4	(0)
- * Club domestic league appearances and goals as of 25 May 2026 ‡ National team caps and goals as of 25 June 2026

Dominique Célidor Simon (born 29 July 2000) is a professional footballer who plays as a defensive midfielder for UAE Pro League club Hatta. Born in France, he plays for the Haiti national team.

== Club career ==
Simon is a product of the youth academies of the French clubs Paris Saint-Germain and Aubervilliers. He made one appearance with Aubervilliers in 2019, before moving to the Spanish club Navarro in 2021. On 23 February 2022, he joined the Estonian Meistriliiga club Paide on a professional contract, and helped them win the 2021–22 Estonian Cup. On 31 January 2024, he moved to the Erovnuli Liga club Dinamo Tbilisi.

On 18 August 2024, he joined the Czech First League club Pardubice. On 22 August 2025, he joined Tatran Prešov on a year-long loan in the Slovak First Football League.

On 29 September 2026, Simon signed a contract with UAE Pro League club Hatta.

== International career ==
Born in France, Simon is of Haitian descent. He was called up to the Haiti national team for the 2026 FIFA World Cup.

== Honours ==
Paide

- Estonian Cup: 2021–22
- Estonian Supercup: 2023
