= 35-e Skola =

Georgian association football club

35th Football School (Georgian: 35-ე საფეხბურთო სკოლა) is an association football club based in Tbilisi, Georgia.

== History ==
35-e Skola was owned by Georgian football manager Gocha Avsajanishvili.
