= Tjipe Karuuombe =

Namibian footballer

Personal information
- Full name: Tjipenandjambi Carl Karuuombe
- Date of birth: 21 September 2001 (age 25)
- Place of birth: Gobabis, Namibia
- Height: 1.76 m (5 ft 9 in)
- Position: Midfielder

Team information
- Current team: Gonio

Youth career
- –2020: Kaizen

Senior career*
Years	Team	Apps	(Gls)
2020–2023	Als Puk Tawana		
2023	Loko Vltavín	1	(0)
2023–2024	UNAM		
2024–2025	Dinamo Tbilisi	1	(0)
2025–	Gonio	15	(0)

International career^{‡}
2022–	Namibia	10	(1)
- * Club domestic league appearances and goals as of 10:29, 20 May 2026 (UTC) ‡ National team caps and goals as of 13:17, 10 December 2024 (UTC)

Tjipe Karuuombe (born 21 September 2001) is a Namibian professional footballer who plays as a midfielder for Liga 3 club Gonio and the Namibia national team.

== Club career ==
Karuuombe started playing football at age six. He then joined the Kaizen Football Academy. In 2020, he left the club and joined Als Puk Tawana of South Africa's Second Division. He remained with the club until the middle of the 2022–23 season when he made the jump to Europe, joining Loko Vltavín of the Bohemian Football League in the Czech Republic. However, he was limited to one league appearance for the club because of injury and found himself back in Namibia. Following recovery, Karuuombe joined UNAM of the Namibia Premiership in April 2023. In August 2024, the defensive midfielder returned to Europe to trial with nineteen-time Georgian champions Dinamo Tbilisi. The three-year deal was officially announced the following month.

On 8 December 2024, in their final game of the season, Karuuombe made his debut for Dinamo Tbilisi.

In July 2025, Karuuombe signed for Erovnuli Liga 2 club Gonio on a contract until the end of the season.

== International career ==
Karuuombe represented Namibia at various youth levels, including at the 2020 COSAFA U-20 Cup and the 2021 U-20 Africa Cup of Nations. Karuuombe's national under-20 squad became the first-ever to qualify for a U-20 Africa Cup of Nations by reaching the tournament in 2021.

Karuuombe was called up to the senior national team by head coach Colin Benjamin for the 2022 COSAFA Cup. He made his senior international debut in the competition on 15 July 2022 in a 1–0 victory over Mozambique in the semi-final. He scored his first senior international goal on 5 June 2024 in an eventual 1–1 2026 FIFA World Cup qualification draw with Liberia.

=== International goals ===
No.	Date	Venue	Opponent	Score	Result	Competition
1	5 June 2024	Orlando Stadium, Soweto, South Africa	Liberia	1–0	1–1	2026 FIFA World Cup qualification
Last updated 29 October 2029

=== International career statistics ===
As of match played 10 September 2024

Namibia national team
Year	Apps	Goals
2022	1	0
2023	0	0
2024	9	1
Total	10	1

== Personal ==
While playing for Als Puk Tawana, Karuuombe also studied mechanical engineering at North-West University.
