= Vakhtang Salia =

Georgian footballer

Personal information
- Date of birth: 30 August 2007 (age 19)
- Place of birth: Tbilisi, Georgia
- Height: 1.81 m (5 ft 11 in)
- Position: Forward

Team information
- Current team: Newcastle United

Youth career
- Dinamo Tbilisi

Senior career*
| Years | Team | Apps | (Gls) |
| 2023– | Dinamo-2 Tbilisi | 3 | (0) |
| 2023–2025 | Dinamo Tbilisi | 49 | (7) |
| 2025– | Newcastle United | 0 | (0) |

International career^{‡}
| 2022– | Georgia U17 | 9 | (1) |
- * Club domestic league appearances and goals as of 19 August 2026 ‡ National team caps and goals as of 23:22, 14 October 2024 (UTC)

Vakhtang Salia (Georgian: ვახტანგ სალია; born 30 August 2007) is a Georgian footballer who plays as a striker for Newcastle United.

== Club career ==
Rated as one of Georgia's biggest talents, Salia made his professional debut for Dinamo Tbilisi on 24 November 2023, in a 2–2 Erovnuli Liga draw against Torpedo Kutaisi. In the following 2024 season, the 16-year-old regularly featured in the starting team of his club. Salia scored his first goal in the Georgian top flight on 10 March 2024, against Torpedo Kutaisi. He scored the winning goal as Dinamo ran out 1–0 winners.

On 29 October 2024, Dinamo Tbilisi and Newcastle United announced that they had agreed a deal for the transfer of Salia in the summer of 2025 when he turns 18.

== International career ==
Salia made his debut for Georgia's under-17 national team in a 3–1 defeat against Israel on October 25, 2022.

== Career statistics ==
=== Club ===
As of match played 24 May 2025

Appearances and goals by club, season and competition
| Club | Season | League | | | Domestic Cup | | Continental | | Other | | Total | |
| Club | Season | Division | Apps | Goals | Apps | Goals | Apps | Goals | Apps | Goals | Apps | Goals |
|---|---|---|---|---|---|---|---|---|---|---|---|---|
| Dinamo Tbilisi | 2023 | Erovnuli Liga | 3 | 0 | 0 | 0 | 0 (Note: Appearance(s) in the UEFA Champions League and UEFA Conference League) | 0 | 0 (Note: Appearance(s) in Georgian Super Cup) | 0 | 3 | 0 |
| Dinamo Tbilisi | 2024 | Erovnuli Liga | 29 | 6 | 3 | 0 | 2 (Note: Appearance(s) and goal(s) in the UEFA Conference League) | 1 | 2 | 0 | 36 | 7 |
| Dinamo Tbilisi | 2025 | Erovnuli Liga | 17 | 1 | 1 | 0 | - | | - | | 18 | 1 |
| Dinamo Tbilisi | Total | | 49 | 7 | 4 | 0 | 2 | 1 | 2 | 0 | 57 | 8 |
| Career Total | | | 49 | 7 | 4 | 0 | 2 | 1 | 2 | 0 | 57 | 8 |
