= Georgian U-15 Liga =

- Organising body: Georgian Football Federation
- Founded: 2016; 10 years ago
- Country: Georgia
- Number of clubs: 11
- Level on pyramid: 1 (of under-15 age group)
- Current champions: Dinamo Tbilisi (2025)
- Most championships: Dinamo Tbilisi (8 titles)
- Website: gff.ge

The U15 Golden League (Georgian: 15 წლამდელთა ოქროს ლიგა) is the main youth football competition run by the Georgian Football Federation for under-15 teams.

Created in mid-2016, it is named after distinguished player Slava Metreveli and is composed of ten teams.

== Structure and format ==
A playing season of the league consists of two parts. After a ten-team regular tournament, the top five teams qualify for Championship group which determines the winner via an eight-game tournament. The remaining clubs take part in Relegation round with the bottom two teams to be relegated to the Silver League, which is the 2nd division, contested by ten teams as of 2025. 18 more teams compete in the 3rd tier called the Bronze League.

Seasons run based on Spring-Autumn system.

== History ==
The U15 competition started in 2016. Based on geographic principle, initially the teams were divided into three groups before eight of them reached the quarterfinal stage. In a decisive game, Dinamo Tbilisi beat GFF Academy 4–0 to win the title.

The next year, Dinamo's youth teams of different age groups clinched seven out of eight titles with U15s being no exception. In total, they lost the title race once only in 2019 to Saburtalo.

The 2020 league season was abandoned after six rounds following severe COVID-19 restrictions. The latter also affected the next edition which was completed in June 2022 only.

Dinamo Tbilisi are the most recent champions who have accrued five consecutive titles since 2021.

== Current teams ==
There are currently eleven teams competing in U15 Golden League.

- Celero
- Dinamo Tbilisi
- Dinamo Tbilisi-2
- Inter
- Gldani
- GFF Academy Kutaisi
- GFF Academy Zugdidi
- Iberia 1999
- Locomotive
- Merani Martvili
- Torpedo

== Seasons ==
Season	Champion	Runner-up	Third place
2016	Dinamo Tbilisi	GFF Academy Tbilisi	
2017	Dinamo Tbilisi		
2018	Dinamo Tbilisi	GFF Academy Kutaisi	Saburtalo
2019	Saburtalo	Dinamo Tbilisi	GFF Academy
2020	Abandoned due to COVID-19 pandemic		
2021	Dinamo Tbilisi	GFF Academy Zugdidi-2	Saburtalo Tbilisi
2022	Dinamo Tbilisi	Lagodekhi	GFF Academy Zugdidi-2
2023	Dinamo Tbilisi	35th Football School	GFF Academy Zugdidi
2024	Dinamo Tbilisi	GFF Academy Kutaisi	Iberia 1999
2025	Dinamo Tbilisi	Iberia 1999	Inter

Note: Saburtalo changed its name to Iberia 1999 in February 2024
