= Tobias Schützenauer =

Austrian footballer (born 1997)

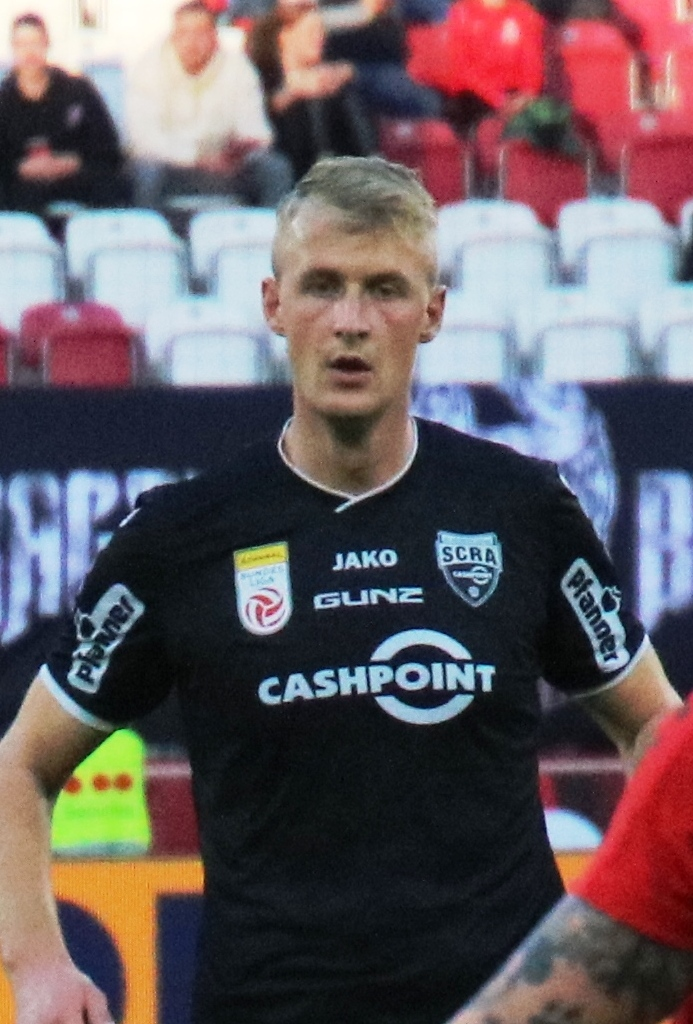
- Schützenauer in 2023

Personal information
- Date of birth: 19 May 1997 (age 29)
- Place of birth: Graz, Austria
- Height: 1.83 m (6 ft 0 in)
- Position: Goalkeeper

Team information
- Current team: LASK
- Number: 33

Youth career
- GAK Jugend
- Sturm Graz U15
- Sturm Graz U16

Senior career*
Years	Team	Apps	(Gls)
2013–2018	SK Sturm Graz II	70	(0)
2014–2023	SK Sturm Graz	8	(0)
2023–2024	SCR Altach	6	(0)
2024	Dinamo Tbilisi	1	(0)
2025–	LASK	2	(0)
- * Club domestic league appearances and goals as of 11 June 2025

Tobias Schützenauer (born 19 May 1997) is an Austrian professional footballer who plays as a goalkeeper for Austrian Football Bundesliga club LASK.

== Career ==
=== GAK Jugend ===
Schützenauer started his youth career with GAK Jugend in 2010.

=== Sturm Graz ===
Schützenauer started his career in the Sturm Graz youth system in July 2010. He worked his way up through the academy, playing for the U15 and U16 teams before getting a chance in the B-Team. He made 49 appearances for the B-Squad before getting promoted to the senior team on 7 January 2014. He made his first appearance for the senior squad on 24 May 2015 in a 2–1 victory over Admira Wacker. He came on in the 35th minute, replacing an injured Christian Gratzei.

=== SCR Altach ===
Schützenauer signed with SCR Altach on 29 June 2023.

=== Dinamo Tbilisi ===
On 16 November 2024, Dinamo Tbilisi announced the signing of Schützenauer on a short-term contract until the end of the 2024 Erovnuli Liga season, with an option for an additional season. On 15 January 2025, Dinamo Tbilisi announced that Schützenauer had left the club after his contract had expired.

=== LASK ===
On 6 February 2025, Schützenauer joined LASK until the end of the 2024–25 season.

== Career statistics ==
As of match played 21 October 2026

Appearances and goals by club, season and competition
Club	Season	League			Cup		Europe		Total	
Club	Season	Division	Apps	Goals	Apps	Goals	Apps	Goals	Apps	Goals
Sturm Graz II	2013–14	Austrian Regionalliga Central	10	0	–		–		10	0
Sturm Graz II	2014–15	Austrian Regionalliga Central	17	0	–		–		17	0
Sturm Graz II	2015–16	Austrian Regionalliga Central	12	0	–		–		12	0
Sturm Graz II	2016–17	Austrian Regionalliga Central	18	0	–		–		18	0
Sturm Graz II	2017–18	Austrian Regionalliga Central	11	0	–		–		11	0
Sturm Graz II	2020–21	Austrian Regionalliga Central	2	0	–		–		2	0
Sturm Graz II	Total		70	0	0	0	0	0	70	0
Sturm Graz	2014–15	Austrian Bundesliga	2	0	–		–		2	0
Sturm Graz	2017–18	Austrian Bundesliga	1	0	1	0	–		2	0
Sturm Graz	2018–19	Austrian Bundesliga	1	0	0	0	1 (Note: Appearance in UEFA Europa League)	0	2	0
Sturm Graz	2020–21	Austrian Bundesliga	2	0	0	0	0	0	2	0
Sturm Graz	2022–23	Austrian Bundesliga	1	0	1	0	0	0	2	0
Sturm Graz	Total		8	0	2	0	1	0	11	0
SCR Altach	2023–24	Austrian Bundesliga	6	0	1	0	–		7	0
Dinamo Tbilisi	2024	Erovnuli Liga	1	0	–		–		1	0
LASK	2024–25	Austrian Bundesliga	2	0	0	0	–		2	0
LASK	2026–27	Austrian Bundesliga	0	0	1	0	1 (Note: Appearance in UEFA Champions League)	0	2	0
LASK	Total		2	0	1	0	1	0	4	0
Career total			86	0	4	0	2	0	92	0

== Honours ==
LASK

- Austrian Cup: 2025–26
