= Saba Khvadagiani =

Georgian footballer

Saba Khvadagiani საბა ხვადაგიანი
Personal information
- Date of birth: 30 January 2003 (age 23)
- Place of birth: Tbilisi, Georgia
- Height: 1.86 m (6 ft 1 in)
- Position: Defender

Team information
- Current team: Dinamo Tbilisi
- Number: 40

Youth career
- 2013–2021: Dinamo Tbilisi

Senior career*
Years	Team	Apps	(Gls)
2020–2024	Dinamo Tbilisi	81	(3)
2023	Dinamo Tbilisi 2	1	(1)
2024–	Maccabi Netanya	13	(0)
2024–25	→ Dinamo Tbilisi (loan)	33	(1)

International career^{‡}
2018–2020	Georgia U17	12	(1)
2021	Georgia U19	3	(0)
2021–2025	Georgia U21	31	(3)
2021–	Georgia	1	(0)
- * Club domestic league appearances and goals as of 15 April 2025 ‡ National team caps and goals as of 18 June 2025

Saba Khvadagiani (Georgian: საბა ხვადაგიანი; born 30 January 2003) is a Georgian professional footballer who plays as a defender for Erovnuli Liga club Dinamo Tbilisi and the Georgia national team.

Being the two-time Erovnuli Liga winner, Khvadagiani played 45 matches for Georgian national youth teams combined and took part in two editions of the UEFA European Under-21 Championship.

== Career ==
Khvadagiani is a product of the youth academy of Dinamo Tbilisi. He made an Erovnuli Liga debut with this club on 27 February 2021 in an opening match of the season against Samgurali. His first league goal scored against Telavi on 16 May 2021 turned out a winner. Following this season, Khvadagiani was selected as U19 Player of the Year and named in Erovnuli Liga Team of the Year.

In January 2022, the player signed a new two-year contract with Dinamo. Overall, during four seasons between 2020 and 2024, he twice won the league.

On January 30, 2024, Khvadagiani joined Israeli Premier League club Maccabi Netanya for a transfer fee of €500,000, which is the highest transfer fee Netanya has ever paid for a foreign player.

== International career ==
Khvadagiani was first called up to the U15 team as Georgia hosted a four-team international tournament in 2017. A year later he debuted for the U16s in UEFA Development Cup.

In 2019, Khvadagiani joined the U17 team and played in two successive UEFA European Championship qualifying campaigns. After featuring for the U19s in three matches of their 2022 UEFA European Championship qualification round, Khvadagiani was named in the U21 squad for the first time in March 2021. Since then he was a regular team member during the next four years, scoring his first goal against Ukraine in a friendly game held in Gori on 21 November 2022.

Khvadagiani took part in Georgia's all four matches of the 2023 European championship. As the team began a new 2023–24 qualifying campaign, he was selected as the captain. Khvadagiani converted from the spot in a decisive play-off tie against Croatia and helped the team book its place in the Euro Under-21. He played all three matches in full, setting an all-time Georgian U21 appearance record with 31 caps to his name.

Khvadagiani made his senior national team debut on 8 September 2021 in a friendly against Bulgaria, a 1–4 away loss.

== Statistics ==
As of match played 28 May 2025

Appearances and goals by club, season and competition
Club	Season	League			National cup		Continental		Other		Total	
Club	Season	Division	Apps	Goals	Apps	Goals	Apps	Goals	Apps	Goals	Apps	Goals
Dinamo Tbilisi	2020	Erovnuli Liga	0	0	1	0	–		–		1	0
Dinamo Tbilisi	2021	Erovnuli Liga	26	1	–		4 (Note: Two appearances in UEFA Champions League qualifiers and two appearances in UEFA Europa Conference League qualifiers)	0	–		30	1
Dinamo Tbilisi	2022	Erovnuli Liga	24	0	2	0	–		–		26	0
Dinamo Tbilisi	2023	Erovnuli Liga	31	2	2	0	4 (Note: Two appearances in UEFA Champions League qualifiers and two appearances in UEFA Europa Conference League qualifiers)	0	–		37	2
Dinamo Tbilisi 2	2023	Erovnuli Liga 2	1	1	–		–		–		1	1
Maccabi Netanya	2023–24	Israeli Premier League	8	0	2	0	–		–		10	0
Dinamo Tbilisi (loan)	2024	Erovnuli Liga	17	1	4	2	2 (Note: Appearances in UEFA Conference League)	0	1 (Note: Appearance in Georgian Super Cup)	0	24	3
Dinamo Tbilisi (loan)	2025	Erovnuli Liga	16	0	–		–		–		16	0
Dinamo Tbilisi (loan)	Total		114	4	9	2	10	0	1	0	134	6
Career total			123	5	11	2	10	0	1	0	145	7

== Honours ==
Dinamo Tbilisi

- Erovnuli Liga: 2020, 2022
- Georgian Super Cup: 2021, 2023

Individual

- U19 Player of the Year: 2021
- Erovnuli Liga Team of the Year: 2021
