= Dominik Reiter =

Austrian footballer (born 1998)

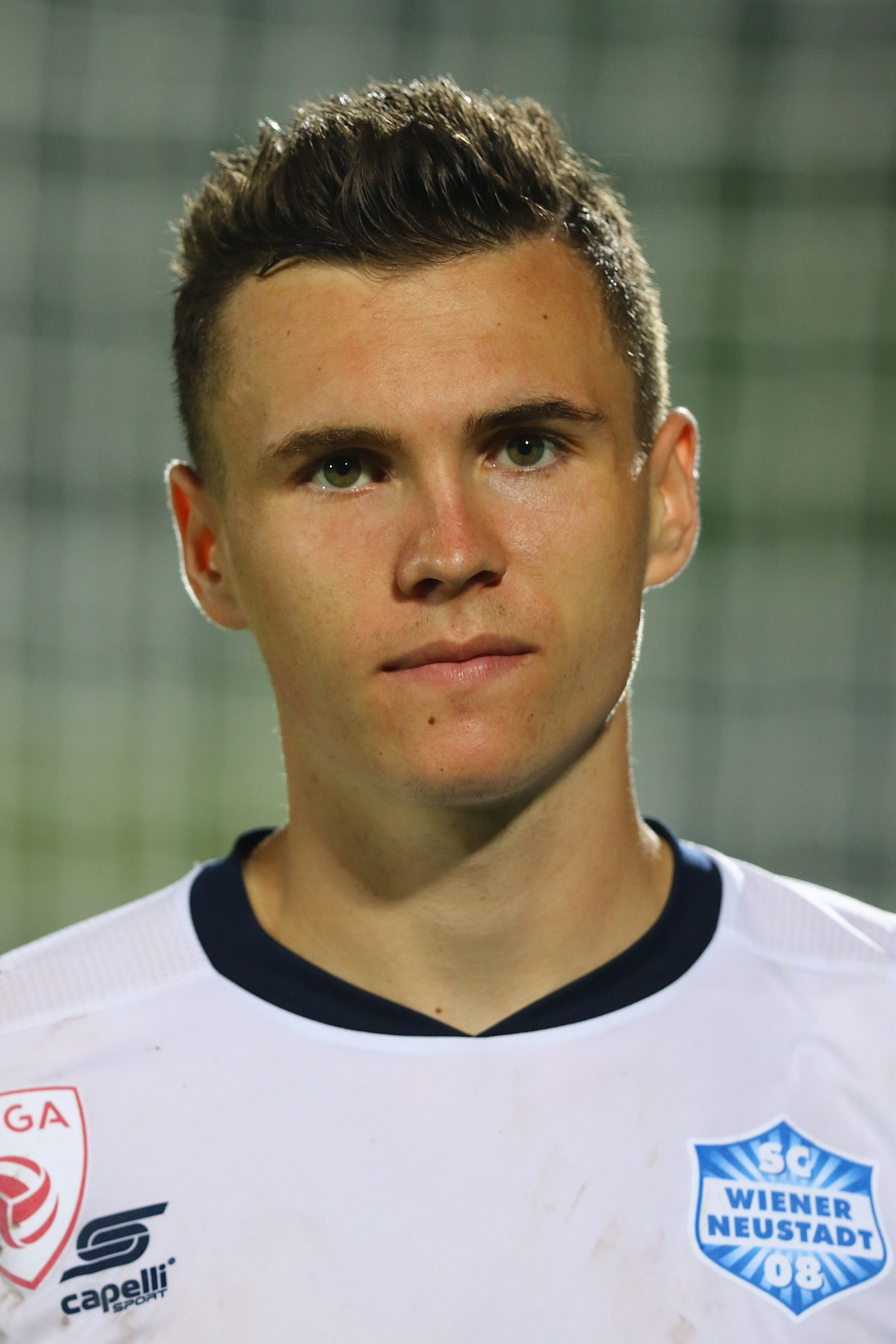
- Reiter with Wiener Neustadt in 2018

Personal information
- Date of birth: 4 January 1998 (age 28)
- Place of birth: Grieskirchen, Austria
- Height: 1.73 m (5 ft 8 in)
- Positions: Forward; winger

Team information
- Current team: Blau-Weiß Linz
- Number: 29

Youth career
- 2004–2009: SV Schlüßlberg
- 2009–2012: SV Pöttinger Grieskirchen
- 2012–2016: AKA Linz

Senior career*
Years	Team	Apps	(Gls)
2016–2019	FC Juniors OÖ	47	(16)
2016–2021	LASK	58	(4)
2018–2019	→ Wiener Neustadt (loan)	19	(5)
2021–2024	Rheindorf Altach	47	(1)
2024–2025	Dinamo Tbilisi	18	(2)
2025–	Blau-Weiß Linz	16	(1)

International career^{‡}
2016–2017	Austria U19	5	(0)
2020	Austria U21	2	(0)
- * Club domestic league appearances and goals as of 10 June 2026 ‡ National team caps and goals as of 9 October 2020

Dominik Reiter (born 4 January 1998) is an Austrian professional footballer who plays as a forward or winger for Blau-Weiß Linz.

== Club career ==
=== LASK ===
He made his Austrian Football First League debut for LASK on 18 October 2016 in a game against SC Wiener Neustadt.

=== Rheindorf Altach ===
On 22 June 2021, he signed a three-year contract with Rheindorf Altach.

On 10 September 2022, during the first half of a match that ended in a 0–0 draw against WSG Tirol, Reiter sustained a torn anterior cruciate ligament, leading to his absence from play for an extended period. He returned nearly a year later on 5 August 2023, making a comeback by replacing Lukas Gugganig at half-time during a 4–0 league defeat against Rapid Wien.

=== Dinamo Tbilisi ===
On 30 July 2024, Dinamo Tbilisi announced the signing of Reiter from SC Rheindorf Altach on a contract until the end of 2025.

== Career statistics ==
=== Club ===
As of match played 10 December 2023

Appearances and goals by club, season and competition
Club	Season	League			Cup		Europe		Other		Total	
Club	Season	Division	Apps	Goals	Apps	Goals	Apps	Goals	Apps	Goals	Apps	Goals
Juniors OÖ	2015–16	Austrian Regionalliga	10	2	—		—		—		8	1
Juniors OÖ	2016–17	Austrian Regionalliga	18	8	—		—		—		8	1
Juniors OÖ	2017–18	Austrian Regionalliga	11	4	—		—		—		8	1
Juniors OÖ	2019–20	2. Liga	8	2	—		—		—		8	1
Juniors OÖ	Total		47	16	—		—		—		47	16
LASK	2016–17	2. Liga	7	0	1	1	—		—		8	1
LASK	2017–18	Austrian Bundesliga	17	0	0	0	—		—		17	0
LASK	2019–20	Austrian Bundesliga	12	1	0	0	2 (Note: Appearances in UEFA Europa League)	0	—		14	1
LASK	2020–21	Austrian Bundesliga	22	3	4	0	3	0	—		5	0
LASK	Total		58	4	5	1	5	0	—		68	5
Wiener Neustadt (loan)	2018–19	2. Liga	19	5	0	0	—		—		19	5
Rheindorf Altach	2021–22	Austrian Bundesliga	24	1	1	0	—		—		25	1
Rheindorf Altach	2022–23	Austrian Bundesliga	7	0	2	0	—		—		9	0
Rheindorf Altach	2023–24	Austrian Bundesliga	11	0	2	1	—		—		13	1
Rheindorf Altach	Total		42	1	5	1	—		—		47	2
Career total			166	26	10	2	5	0	0	0	181	28
