= 2024 FC Dinamo Batumi season =

Dinamo Batumi
2024 season
- Chairman: (Georgia (country)) Archil Beridze
- Manager: (Ukraine) Andriy Demchenko (until 9 October) (Georgia (country)) Gia Chiabrishvili (after 18 October)
- Stadium: Batumi Stadium
- Erovnuli Liga: 4th
- Georgian Cup: Quarterfinals (eliminated by Dinamo Tbilisi)
- Super Cup: 3rd
- UEFA Champions League: 1st qualifying round (eliminated by Ludogorets)
- UEFA Conference League: 2nd qualifying round (eliminated by Dečić)
- Top goalscorer: League: Lado Mamuchashvili; Mario Balburdia (5 goals each); All: Lado Mamuchashvili (8 goals)
- Highest home attendance: 14,967 (vs Ludogorets, 17 July)
- Biggest win: 3–1 vs Gagra (A), 7 March, Erovnuli Liga; 3–1 vs Samtredia (A), 16 April, Erovnuli Liga; 2–0 vs Dinamo Tbilisi (H), 8 April, Erovnuli Liga
- Biggest defeat: 0–3 vs Iberia 1999 (A), 2 April, Erovnuli Liga; 0–3 vs Iberia 1999 (A), 14 September, Erovnuli Liga
Home colours	Away colours

The 2024 season is the 101st year in the existence of Dinamo Batumi and their sixth successive season in the Erovnuli Liga, the top division of Georgian football. As the reigning league champions, Dinamo Batumi are participating in five competitions this season, namely the Erovnuli Liga, the national cup, the Georgian Super Cup, UEFA Champions League and, after an early exit from the latter, in UEFA Conference League.

This section covers the period from 1 January to 31 December 2024.

== Transfers ==
=== In ===
Date	No.	Pos.	Player	From	Ref
10 January	3	DF	(Serbia) Bojan Mlađović	(Kazakhstan) Tobol	
10 January	7	FW	(Senegal) Honore Gomis	(Georgia (country)) Dila	
11 January	5	MF	(Brazil) Alef Santos	(Georgia (country)) Dila	
11 January	9	FW	(Georgia (country)) David Mujiri	(Georgia (country)) Shukura (end of loan)	
11 January	25	DF	(Brazil) Wanderson Silva	(Georgia (country)) Dila	
9 February	2	DF	(Georgia (country)) Nikoloz Mali	(Georgia (country)) Dinamo Tbilisi	
9 February	9	FW	(Brazil) Gabriel Ramos	(South Korea) Bucheon 1995	
9 February	15	MF	(Ghana) Edmund Arko-Mensah	(Finland) Honka	
15 February	19	MF	(Albania) Uerdi Mara	(Turkey) Ankara Keçiörengücü	
28 February	1	GK	(Georgia (country)) Mate Turmanidze	Academy	
28 February	13	GK	(Georgia (country)) Luka Kharatishvili	(Georgia (country)) Samtredia (end of loan)	
28 February	36	DF	(Georgia (country)) Nikoloz Baladze	Academy	
28 February	37	MF	(Georgia (country)) Giorgi Putkaradze	Academy	
28 February	21	DF	(Ukraine) Yevhen Chahovets	(Lithuania) Riteriai	
14 March	11	FW	(Georgia (country)) Levan Kutalia	Free agent	
27 June	21	FW	(The Gambia) Bubakarr Tambedou	(Israel) Hapoel Tel Aviv	
27 June	31	FW	(Georgia (country)) Revaz Injgia	(Georgia (country)) Samtredia	
1 July	26	DF	(Georgia (country)) Iva Gelashvili	(Italy) Spezia (end of loan)	
3 July	35	DF	(Georgia (country)) Revaz Chiteishvili	(Armenia) Alashkert	
7 July	16	GK	(Portugal) Ricardo Silva	(Portugal) Tondela	
14 September	8	MF	(Angola) Mario Balburdia	(Portugal) Mafra	
20 September	6	MF	(Ukraine) Artem Mylchenko	(Latvia) Valmiera	

=== Out ===
Date	No.	Pos.	Player	Ref
10 January	8	MF	(Denmark) Alexander Jakobsen	
10 January	9	FW	(Georgia (country)) Tornike Kapanadze	
10 January	11	FW	(Georgia (country)) Mate Vatsadze	
10 January	18	DF	(Georgia (country)) Giorgi Rekhviashvili	
10 January	21	GK	(Georgia (country)) Giorgi Begashvili	
10 January	31	GK	(Belarus) Anton Chichkan	
10 January	33	DF	(Montenegro) Saša Balić	
10 January	35	DF	(Georgia (country)) Grigol Chabradze	
1 February	24	MF	(Georgia (country)) Irakli Bidzinashvili	
1 July	8	FW	(Brazil) Gabriel Ramos	
1 July	11	FW	(Georgia (country)) Levan Kutalia	
1 July	15	MF	(Ghana) Edmund Arko-Mensah	
1 July	20	MF	(Georgia (country)) Giorgi Tsitaishvili	
1 July	21	DF	(Ukraine) Yevhen Chahovets	
1 July	33	MF	(Brazil) Victor Vieira Vitinho	
4 July	10	MF	(Georgia (country)) Tsotne Patsatsia	
24 July	3	DF	(Serbia) Bojan Mlađović	
31 July	27	MF	(Georgia (country)) Paata Gudushauri	
5 August	17	MF	(Georgia (country)) Lado Mamuchashvili	
14 September	26	DF	(Georgia (country)) Iva Gelashvili	

=== Loaned in ===
Date	No.	Pos.	Player	Club	Return	Ref
21 June	11	FW	(Spain) Jalen Blesa	(Romania) Craiova		
28 June	40	MF	(Georgia (country)) Dito Pachulia	(Georgia (country)) Samtredia	End of season	

== Squad ==
As of match played 8 December 2024

Appearances and goals include the Erovnuli Liga only.

Note: Flags indicate national team as has been defined under FIFA eligibility rules. Players may hold more than one non-FIFA nationality.

No.	Player	Nat.	Positions	Date of birth (age)	Signed in	Apps.	Goals
Goalkeepers
1	Mate Turmanidze	(Georgia (country))	GK	29 September 2005 (age 20)	2024	1	0
13	Luka Kharatishvili	(Georgia (country))	GK	11 January 2003 (age 22)	2023	16	0
16	Ricardo Silva	(Portugal)	GK	9 May 2000 (age 25)	2024	5	0
30	Roin Kvaskhvadze	(Georgia (country))	GK	31 May 1989 (age 36)	2023	15	0
Defenders
2	Nikoloz Mali	(Georgia (country))	DF	27 January 1999 (age 26)	2024	35	0
4	Luka Kapianidze	(Georgia (country))	DF	10 January 1999 (age 26)	2022	21	0
14	Levan Kharabadze	(Georgia (country))	DF	26 January 2000 (age 25)	2023	22	1
23	Mamuka Kobakhidze	(Georgia (country))	DF	23 August 1992 (age 33)	2019	30	3
25	Wanderson Silva	(Brazil)	DF	13 September 1991 (age 34)	2024	23	0
35	Revaz Chiteishvili	(Georgia (country))	DF	30 January 1994 (age 31)	2024	17	0
36	Nikoloz Baladze	(Georgia (country))	DF	28 January 2006 (age 19)	2024	0	0
Midfielders
5	Alef Santos	(Brazil)	MF	6 November 1996 (age 29)	2024	17	0
6	Artem Mylchenko	(Ukraine)	MF	22 July 2000 (age 25)	2024	10	1
8	Mario Balburdia	(Angola)	MF	19 August 1997 (age 28)	2024	12	5
19	Uerdi Mara	(Albania)	MF	30 January 1999 (age 26)	2024	25	3
20	Giorgi Gogmachadze	(Georgia (country))	MF	5 March 2006 (age 19)	2024	1	0
22	Davit Inaishvili	(Georgia (country))	MF	24 February 2006 (age 19)	2024	10	0
26	Nika Dumbadze	(Georgia (country))	MF	21 June 2006 (age 19)	2024	12	1
29	Jean Victor	(Brazil)	MF	21 March 1995 (age 30)	2024	18	1
31	Revaz Injgia	(Georgia (country))	MF	31 December 2000 (age 24)	2024	16	3
37	Giorgi Putkaradze	(Georgia (country))	MF	12 November 2005 (age 20)	2023	5	0
38	Aleksandre Gugushvili	(Georgia (country))	MF	29 August 2006 (age 19)	2024	2	0
39	Guram Japaridze	(Georgia (country))	MF	15 August 2005 (age 20)	2024	4	0
40	Dito Pachulia	(Georgia (country))	MF	5 July 2002 (age 23)	2024	15	0
Forwards
7	Honore Gomis	(Senegal)	FW	27 February 1996 (age 29)	2024	29	4
9	David Mujiri	(Georgia (country))	FW	28 January 1999 (age 26)	2023	30	4
11	Jalen Blesa	(Spain)	FW	5 February 2001 (age 24)	2024	11	2
21	Bubakarr Tambedou	(The Gambia)	FW	5 April 2002 (age 23)	2024	15	0
Players transferred out during the season
3	Bojan Mlađović	(Serbia)	DF	16 October 1995 (age 30)	2024	10	0
8	Gabriel Ramos	(Brazil)	FW	20 March 1996 (age 29)	2024	6	0
10	Tsotne Patsatsia	(Georgia (country))	MF	28 March 2000 (age 25)	2023	12	0
11	Levan Kutalia	(Georgia (country))	FW	19 July 1989 (age 36)	2024	11	1
15	Edmund Arko-Mensah	(Ghana)	MF	9 September 2001 (age 24)	2024	4	0
17	Lado Mamuchashvili	(Georgia (country))	MF	29 August 1997 (age 28)	2018	18	5
20	Giorgi Tsitaishvili	(Georgia (country))	MF	18 November 2000 (age 25)	2023	17	1
21	Yevhen Chahovets	(Ukraine)	DF	24 March 1998 (age 27)	2024	4	0
26	Iva Gelashvili	(Georgia (country))	DF	8 April 2001 (age 24)	2022	0	0
27	Paata Gudushauri	(Georgia (country))	MF	7 June 1997 (age 28)	2022	16	4
33	Victor Vieira Vitinho	(Brazil)	MF	8 September 1997 (age 28)	2023	6	0

=== Out on loan ===
Note: Flags indicate national team as defined under FIFA eligibility rules; some limited exceptions apply. Players may hold more than one non-FIFA nationality.

No.	Pos.	Nation	Player
—	FW	GEO	Davit Zurabiani (at Kolkheti 1913)

== Friendly matches ==
Date	Venue	Opponents	Result	Goalscorers	Ref.
18 January	Batumi	Kolkheti 1913	1–1	Mujiri	
24 January	Belek	Termalica	1–1	Gudushauri	
28 January	Belek	Shkendija	0–2		
1 February	Belek	Zagłębie Lubin	1–1	Kapianidze	
11 February	Belek	Kolos	1–3	Jean Victor	
14 February	Belek	Zorya	2–2	Ramos, Alef Santos	
17 February	Belek	Cherkasy	0–1		
20 February	Belek	Riga	0–3		
23 March	Batumi	Kolkheti 1913	2–1	Kutalia, Gudushauri	
21 June	Gori	Urartu	3–2	Blesa, Mamuchashvili (2)	

== Competitions ==
=== Overview ===
Competition	First match	Last match	Starting round	Final position	Record							
Competition	First match	Last match	Starting round	Final position	Pld	W	D	L	GF	GA	GD	Win %
Erovnuli Liga	1 March	8 December	Matchday 1	4th	36	15	10	11	42	41	+1	41.67
Georgian Cup	14 August	19 September	Round of 16	Quarterfinals	2	1	0	1	2	2	+0	50.00
Super Cup	28 June	3 July	Semifinal	3rd	2	1	1	0	6	5	+1	50.00
UEFA Champions League	10 Jul	17 July	1st qualifying round	1st qualifying round	2	1	0	1	2	3	−1	50.00
UEFA Conference League	24 July	30 July	2nd qualifying round	2nd qualifying round	2	0	1	1	0	2	−2	0.00
Total					44	18	12	14	52	53	−1	40.91

Source: Competitions

=== Erovnuli Liga ===
==== Results summary ====
Overall								Home						Away					
Pld	W	D	L	GF	GA	GD	Pts	W	D	L	GF	GA	GD	W	D	L	GF	GA	GD
36	15	10	11	42	41	+1	55	7	5	6	20	19	+1	8	5	5	22	22	0

Last updated: 8 December 2024.
Source: See Results

==== Results by round ====
Round	1	2	3	4	5	6	7	8	9	10	11	12	13	14	15	16	17	18	19	20	21	22	23	24	25	26	27	28	29	30	31	32	33	34	35	36
Ground	H	A	H	A	H	A	H	A	H	A	H	A	H	A	H	A	H	A	H	A	H	A	H	A	H	A	H	A	H	A	H	A	H	A	H	A
Result	W	W	W	W	W	L	W	D	W	D	L	W	D	L	L	W	L	D	D	D	D	L	D	L	D	W	L	W	W	D	W	L	L	W	L	W
Position	4	1	1	1	1	1	1	2	2	3	3	3	3	3	3	3	4	4	4	4	4	4	4	4	4	4	4	4	4	4	4	4	4	4	4	4

Source: See Results
A = Away; H = Home; W = Win; D = Draw; L = Loss

==== Results ====
Date	Opponents	Venue	Score	Scorer(s)
1 March	Kolkheti 1913	H	1–0	Gomis 11'
7 March	Gagra	A	3–1	Jean Victor 16', Kobakhidze 62', o.g. 80'
11 March	Samgurali	H	1–0	Kobakhidze 45+3'
16 March	Telavi	A	1–0	Mujiri 38'
29 March	Torpedo	H	3–2	Gomis 3', o.g. 86', Mamuchashvili 90+7 (pen.)
2 April	Iberia 1999	A	0–3	
8 April	Dinamo Tbilisi	H	2–0	Gomis 34', Kutalia 68"
12 April	Dila	A	0–0	
16 April	Samtredia	H	3–1	o.g. 40', Gudushauri 88', Mujiri 90+6
20 April	Kolkheti 1913	A	2–2	Mamuchashvili 45', 45+4
27 April	Gagra	H	0–1	
1 May	Samgurali	A	1–0	Mamuchashvili 77' (pen.)
11 May	Telavi	H	1–1	Gudushauri 64'
15 May	Torpedo	A	0–1	
19 May	Iberia 1999	H	2–3	Tsitaishvili 5', Gudushauri 67'
23 May	Dinamo Tbilisi	A	2–1	Gudushauri 46', Mara 53'
27 May	Dila	H	0–2	
1 June	Samtredia	A	2–2	Mamuchashvili 33', Kharabadze 53'
4 August	Kolkheti 1913	H	0–0	
10 August	Gagra	A	1–1	Mara 6'
18 August	Samgurali	H	0–0	
24 August	Telavi	A	1–2	Mujiri 18'
1 September	Torpedo	H	1–1	Mara 4'
14 September	Iberia 1999	A	0–3	
23 September	Dinamo Tbilisi	H	1–1	Balburdia 28'
27 September	Dila	A	2–1	Mujiri 69', Gomis 80'
1 October	Samtredia	H	1–2	Balburdia 6'
5 October	Kolkheti 1913	A	1–0	Balburdia 16'
18 October	Gagra	H	3–2	Balburdia 11', Injgia 63', Mylchenko 72'
27 October	Samgurali	A	3–3	Injgia 48', Kobakhidze 72', Blesa 90+8'
2 November	Telavi	H	3–2	Balburdia 30'
8 November	Torpedo	A	0–1	
23 November	Iberia 1999	H	0–1	
27 November	Dinamo Tbilisi	A	2–1	Blesa 15' (pen.), Dumbadze 27'
1 December	Dila	H	0–2	
8 December	Samtredia	A	1–0	Injgia 64'

==== League table ====
Pos	Team	Pld	W	D	L	GF	GA	GD	Pts	Qualification or relegation
2	Torpedo Kutaisi	36	21	7	8	58	40	+18	70	Qualification for the Conference League first qualifying round
3	Dila Gori	36	19	11	6	58	30	+28	68	Qualification for the Conference League first qualifying round
4	Dinamo Batumi	36	15	10	11	42	41	+1	55	
5	Samgurali Tsqaltubo	36	11	11	14	51	49	+2	44	
6	Kolkheti-1913	36	9	14	13	48	58	−10	41	

Source: Erovnuli Liga, Soccerway
Rules for classification: 1) Points; 2) Head-to-head points; 3) Head-to-head goal difference; 4) Head-to-head goals scored; 5) Head-to-head away goals scored (only if two teams); 6) Goal difference; 7) Goals scored.

=== Super Cup ===
28 June 2024 Semifinal	Dinamo Batumi	3–3 (2–3 p)	Torpedo	Batumi
21:00 GET	Mamuchashvili 12' (pen.), Gudushauri 25', 84'	Report	Johnsen 19', 73', Jorginho 90+3'	Stadium: Batumi Stadium; Referee: A.Aptsiauri
	Penalties
	(penalty missed) Mamuchashvili; (penalty missed) Kharabadze; (penalty scored) Mara; (penalty scored) Gomis; (penalty missed) Gudushauri		(penalty scored) Johnsen; (penalty missed) Manjgaladze; (penalty scored) Pires; (penalty missed) Gigauri; (penalty scored) Arabidze

3 July 2024 3rd place play-off	Dinamo Batumi	3–2	Iberia 1999	Batumi
20:00 GET	Jinjolava 20' o.g. Tambedou 68', 76'	Report	Nonikashvili 45+5 (pen.); Mamatsashvili 90+1'	Stadium: Football Federation Technical Centre

=== Georgian Cup ===
14 August Round of 16	Meshakhte	1–2	Dinamo Batumi	Tkibuli
16:30 GET	Bukhaidze 54'	Report	Mujiri 45+9'; Tambedou 87' (pen.)	Stadium: Vladimer Bochorishvili stadium Referee: I.Shengelia

19 September Quarterfinals	Dinamo Tbilisi	1–0	Dinamo Batumi	Tbilisi
20:00 GET	Gotsiridze 52'	Report		Stadium: Davit Petriashvili Arena; Referee: I.Kvirikashvili

=== UEFA Champions League ===
==== 1st qualifying round ====
10 July 2024 1st leg	(Bulgaria) Ludogorets	3–1	(Georgia (country)) Dinamo Batumi	Razgrad
22:00 GET	Tekpetey 13'; Rick 24'; Witry 72'	Report	Mamuchashvili 62'	Stadium: Ludogorets Arena; Attendance: 4,561; Referee: Robert Schröder (GER)

17 July 2024 2nd leg	(Georgia (country)) Dinamo Batumi	1–0	(Bulgaria) Ludogorets	Batumi
21:00 GET	Mamuchashvili 3'	Report		Stadium: Batumi Stadium; Attendance: 14,967; Referee: Dario Bel (CRO)

=== UEFA Conference League ===
==== 2nd qualifying round ====
24 July 2024 1st leg	(Georgia (country)) Dinamo Batumi	0–2	(Montenegro) Dečić	Batumi
21:00 GET		Report	Camaj 61', 66'	Stadium: Batumi Stadium; Attendance: 10,637; Referee: Sayat Karabayev (KAZ)

30 July 2024 2nd leg	(Montenegro) Dečić	0–0	(Georgia (country)) Dinamo Batumi	Podgorica
23:00 GET		Report		Stadium: Training Camp; Attendance: 1,050; Referee: Jason Barcelo (GIB)

== Statistics ==
As of 8 December 2024

Note: Players with names in italics left the club during the playing season

=== Goalscorers ===
Pl.	Pos.	Nation	No	Name	Erov.Liga	Nat.Cup	Supercup	Champ.League	Conf.League	Total
1	MF	(Georgia (country))	17	Lado Mamuchashvili	5	–	1	2	–	8
2	MF	(Georgia (country))	27	Paata Gudushauri	4	–	2	–	–	6
3	MF	(Angola)	8	Mario Balburdia	5	–	–	–	–	5
3	FW	(Georgia (country))	9	David Mujiri	4	1	–	–	–	5
5	FW	(Senegal)	7	Honore Gomis	4	–	–	–	–	4
6	MF	(Albania)	19	Uerdi Mara	3	–	–	–	–	3
6	FW	(The Gambia)	21	Bubakarr Tambedou	–	1	2	–	–	3
6	DF	(Georgia (country))	23	Mamuka Kobakhidze	3	–	–	–	–	3
6	DF	(Georgia (country))	31	Revaz Injgia	3	–	–	–	–	3
10	FW	(Spain)	11	Jalen Blesa	2	–	–	–	–	2
11	FW	(Georgia (country))	11	Levan Kutalia	1	–	–	–	–	1
11	DF	(Georgia (country))	14	Levan Kharabadze	1	–	–	–	–	1
11	MF	(Georgia (country))	20	Giorgi Tsitaishvili	1	–	–	–	–	1
11	MF	(Georgia (country))	26	Nika Dumbadze	1	–	–	–	–	1
11	MF	(Brazil)	29	Jean Victor	1	–	–	–	–	1
Own goal					3	–	1	–	–	4
TOTAL					42	2	6	2	0	52

=== Clean sheets ===
No.	Player	Erov.Liga	Nat.Cup	Supercup	Champ.League	Conf.League	Total
16	(Portugal) Ricardo Silva	3	–	–	1	1	5
30	(Georgia (country)) Roin Kvaskhvadze	4	–	–	–	–	4
13	(Georgia (country)) Luka Kharatishvili	3	–	–	–	–	3

=== Discipline ===
Pos.	Nat.	No.	Name	Erov.Liga		Nat.Cup		Supercup		Champ.League		Conf.League		Total	
Pos.	Nat.	No.	Name	A yellow rectangle, denoting the yellow penalty card shown to a player being cautioned	A red rectangle, denoting the red penalty card shown to a player being sent off	A yellow rectangle, denoting the yellow penalty card shown to a player being cautioned	A red rectangle, denoting the red penalty card shown to a player being sent off	A yellow rectangle, denoting the yellow penalty card shown to a player being cautioned	A red rectangle, denoting the red penalty card shown to a player being sent off	A yellow rectangle, denoting the yellow penalty card shown to a player being cautioned	A red rectangle, denoting the red penalty card shown to a player being sent off	A yellow rectangle, denoting the yellow penalty card shown to a player being cautioned	A red rectangle, denoting the red penalty card shown to a player being sent off	Total	
DF	(Georgia (country))	2	Nikoloz Mali	7	–	–	–	–	–	–	–	–	–	7	–
MF	(Brazil)	5	Alef Santos	7	–	–	–	1	–	1	–	1	–	10	–
DF	(Georgia (country))	14	Levan Kharabadze	4	–	–	–	–	–	1	–	–	–	5	–
MF	(Albania)	19	Uerdi Mara	4	–	1	–	–	–	–	–	–	–	5	–
FW	(Senegal)	7	Honore Gomis	4	1	–	–	–	–	–	–	–	–	4	1
DF	(Georgia (country))	23	Mamuka Kobakhidze	4	1	–	–	–	–	–	–	–	–	4	1
DF	(Serbia)	3	Bojan Mlađović	4	–	–	–	–	–	–	–	–	–	4	–
DF	(Georgia (country))	35	Revaz Chiteishvili	4	–	–	–	–	–	–	–	–	–	4	–
MF	(Brazil)	29	Jean Victor	2	1	–	–	1	–	–	–	–	–	3	1
DF	(Georgia (country))	4	Luka Kapianidze	3	–	–	–	–	–	–	–	–	–	3	–
FW	(Georgia (country))	9	David Mujiri	2	–	–	–	–	–	–	–	1	–	3	–
MF	(Georgia (country))	10	Tsotne Patsatsia	3	–	–	–	–	–	–	–	–	–	3	–
MF	(Georgia (country))	27	Paata Gudushauri	–	–	–	–	2	–	1	–	–	–	3	–
MF	(Georgia (country))	31	Revaz Injgia	3	–	–	–	–	–	–	–	–	–	3	–
MF	(Ukraine)	6	Artem Mylchenko	2	1	–	–	–	–	–	–	–	–	2	1
GK	(Georgia (country))	13	Luka Kharatishvili	2	–	–	–	–	–	–	–	–	–	2	–
MF	(Georgia (country))	17	Lado Mamuchashvili	2	–	–	–	–	–	–	–	–	–	2	–
DF	(Brazil)	25	Wanderson Silva	2	–	–	–	–	–	–	–	–	–	2	–
MF	(Georgia (country))	40	Dito Pachulia	1	–	1	–	–	–	–	–	–	–	2	–
FW	(Georgia (country))	11	Levan Kutalia	1	1	–	–	–	–	–	–	–	–	1	1
FW	(Spain)	11	Jalen Blesa	1	1	–	–	–	–	–	–	–	–	1	1
MF	(Angola)	8	Mario Balburdia	1	–	–	–	–	–	–	–	–	–	1	–
FW	(Brazil)	8	Gabriel Ramos	1	–	–	–	–	–	–	–	–	–	1	–
MF	(Georgia (country))	20	Giorgi Tsitaishvili	1	–	–	–	–	–	–	–	–	–	1	–
FW	(The Gambia)	21	Bubakarr Tambedou	1	–	–	–	–	–	–	–	–	–	1	–
MF	(Georgia (country))	22	Davit Inaishvili	1	–	–	–	–	–	–	–	–	–	1	–
GK	(Georgia (country))	30	Roin Kvaskhvadze	1	–	–	–	–	–	–	–	–	–	1	–
TOTAL				68	6	2	–	4	–	3	–	2	–	79	6

== Awards ==
Below is the list of players who have received recognition by the Erovnuli Liga during the season.

Date	Nat.	Name	Award
April	(Georgia (country))	Roin Kvaskhvadze	Team of 1st round
April	(Georgia (country))	Mamuka Kobakhidze	Team of 1st round
April	(Georgia (country))	Giorgi Tsitaishvili	Team of 1st round
October	(Georgia (country))	Luka Kapianidze	Team of 3rd round
December	(Angola)	Mario Balburdia	Team of 4th round
