= 2022 FC Dinamo Tbilisi season =

FC Dinamo Tbilisi
2022 season
- Chairman: Roman Pipia
- Manager: Kakhaber Tskhadadze (until 18 June); Giorgi Tchiabrishvili (from 19 June)
- Stadium: Boris Paichadze Dinamo Arena
- Erovnuli Liga: 1st
- Georgian Cup: Semifinal vs Torpedo Kutaisi
- UEFA Europa Conference League: First qualifying round vs Paide Linnameeskond
- Top goalscorer: League: Two Players (10); All: Stanislav Bilenkyi (11); Ousmane Camara (11)

The 2022 FC Dinamo Tbilisi season was the thirty-fourth successive season that FC Dinamo Tbilisi played in the top flight of Georgian football.

== Season events ==
On 17 December 2021, Dinamo Tbilisi announced the signing of Stanislav Bilenkyi from DAC 1904 Dunajská Streda to a two-year contract, with the option of an additional year.

On 18 December 2021, Dinamo Tbilisi announced the year-long loan signing of Godfrey Stephen from Jagiellonia Białystok.

On 22 December 2021, Dinamo Tbilisi announced the signing of Dmitry Antilevsky from Torpedo-BelAZ Zhodino to a three-year contract.

On 9 January, Dinamo Tbilisi announced the signing of Tornike Kirkitadze from Locomotive Tbilisi to a two-year contract with the option of an additional year.

On 13 January, Dinamo Tbilisi announced the signing of Ousmane Camara from Dila Gori to a three-year contract.

On 25 January, Dinamo Tbilisi announced that they had extended their contract with Anzor Mekvabishvili, Saba Khvadagiani, Aleksandre Kalandadze and Giorgi Moistsrapishvili all until the end of 2024, whilst Giorgi Papava and Davit Skhirtladze had extended theirs until the end of 2023, with an option of an additional year, and Giorgi Gabedava had signed a new one-year contract with the option of an additional year.

On 28 January, Giorgi Gvishiani joined Rabotnički on loan from Dinamo Tbilisi for 18-months.

On 1 February, Giorgi Gvishiani and Dinamo Tbilisi extended their contract until 31 December 2024.

On 18 March, Jaduli Iobashvili and Dinamo Tbilisi extended their contract until 31 December 2024.

On 18 June, Dinamo Tbilisi announced the departure of Head Coach Kakhaber Tskhadadze with Giorgi Tchiabrishvili being announced as his replacement the following day.

On 25 June, Dinamo Tbilisi announced the signing of free-agent Imran Oulad Omar on a contract until the end of 2023.

On 26 June, Nodar Lominadze and Giorgi Gvishiani joined Gagra on loan for the remainder of the season.

On 8 July, Papuna Beruashvili joined Sporting CP on a year-long loan deal, with an option for the move to be made permanent at the end of it.

On 9 July, Dinamo Tbilisi announced the signing of Jemal Tabidze on a contract until the end of 2023, after his contract with Kortrijk was terminated by mutual consent.

On 13 September, Dinamo Tbilisi announced the signing of free-agent Anton Chichkan on a contract until the end of the season, with the option of an additional year.

== Squad ==
As of match played 3 December 2022

No.	Name	Nationality	Position	Date of birth (age)	Signed from	Signed in	Contract ends	Apps.	Goals
Goalkeepers
30	Luka Kutaladze	(Georgia (country))	GK	27 April 2001 (aged 21)	Academy	2021		18	0
33	Davit Kereselidze	(Georgia (country))	GK	19 August 1999 (aged 23)	Gagra	2022		8	0
35	Anton Chichkan	(Belarus)	GK	10 July 1995 (aged 27)	Unattached	2022	2022 (+1)	0	0
37	Mikheil Makatsaria	(Georgia (country))	GK	11 June 2004 (aged 18)	Academy	2022		0	0
Defenders
2	Nikoloz Mali	(Georgia (country))	DF	27 January 1999 (aged 23)	Saburtalo Tbilisi	2022		41	0
3	Aleksandre Kalandadze	(Georgia (country))	DF	9 May 2001 (aged 21)	Academy	2020	2024	41	0
4	Saba Khvadagiani	(Georgia (country))	DF	30 January 2001 (aged 21)	Academy	2021	2024	57	1
13	Jemal Tabidze	(Georgia (country))	DF	18 March 1996 (aged 26)	Unattached	2022	2023	15	0
17	Irakli Iakobidze	(Georgia (country))	DF	25 January 2002 (aged 20)	Academy	2021		0	0
20	Temur Gognadze	(Georgia (country))	DF	10 August 2004 (aged 18)	Academy	2022		1	0
20	Giorgi Chkhetiani	(Georgia (country))	DF	20 February 2003 (aged 19)	Academy	2021		4	0
22	Godfrey Stephen	(Nigeria)	DF	22 August 2000 (aged 22)	on loan from Jagiellonia Białystok	2021	2022	14	0
24	Davit Kobouri	(Georgia (country))	DF	24 January 1998 (aged 24)	Academy	2015		165	2
31	Giorgi Maisuradze	(Georgia (country))	DF	31 January 2002 (aged 20)	Academy	2021		15	0
34	Luka Latsabidze	(Georgia (country))	DF	18 March 2004 (aged 18)	Academy	2022		1	0
Midfielders
5	Anzor Mekvabishvili	(Georgia (country))	MF	5 June 2001 (aged 21)	Academy	2020	2024	85	6
6	Imran Oulad Omar	(Netherlands)	MF	11 December 1997 (aged 24)	Unattached	2022	2023	22	9
8	Giorgi Moistsrapishvili	(Georgia (country))	MF	29 September 2001 (aged 21)	Academy	2019	2024	48	9
16	Levan Osikmashvili	(Georgia (country))	MF	20 April 2002 (aged 20)	Academy	2022		24	0
21	Giorgi Kutsia	(Georgia (country))	MF	27 October 1999 (aged 23)	Academy	2017		119	6
23	Tornike Kirkitadze	(Georgia (country))	MF	23 July 1996 (aged 26)	Locomotive Tbilisi	2022	2023	37	5
25	Tornike Morchiladze	(Georgia (country))	MF	10 January 2002 (aged 20)	Academy	2021	2024	28	1
26	Luka Parkadze	(Georgia (country))	MF	6 April 2005 (aged 17)	Academy	2022		3	0
27	Nikoloz Ugrekhelidze	(Georgia (country))	MF	15 August 2003 (aged 19)	Academy	2022		0	0
29	Giorgi Gvishiani	(Georgia (country))	MF	19 November 2003 (aged 19)	Academy	2022		2	0
38	Gabriel Sigua	(Georgia (country))	MF	30 June 2005 (aged 17)	Academy	2022		12	0
Forwards
7	Davit Skhirtladze	(Georgia (country))	FW	16 March 1993 (aged 29)	Viborg	2021	2023 (+1)	39	14
9	Giorgi Gabedava	(Georgia (country))	FW	3 October 1989 (aged 33)	Saburtalo Tbilisi	2020	2022 (+1)	71	22
11	Stanislav Bilenkyi	(Ukraine)	FW	22 August 1998 (aged 24)	DAC 1904 Dunajská Streda	2021	2023	32	11
14	Jaduli Iobashvili	(Georgia (country))	FW	1 January 2004 (aged 18)	Academy	2021	2024	1	0
18	Barnes Osei	(Ghana)	FW	8 January 1995 (aged 27)	Nea Salamis Famagusta	2021	2022	50	10
28	Ousmane Camara	(Guinea)	FW	28 December 1998 (aged 23)	Dila Gori	2022	2024	42	11
39	Lasha Odisharia	(Georgia (country))	FW	23 October 2002 (aged 20)	Merani Martvili	2020		8	1
40	Dmitry Antilevsky	(Belarus)	FW	12 June 1997 (aged 25)	Torpedo-BelAZ Zhodino	2021	2024	29	4
Players away on loan
6	Nodar Lominadze	(Georgia (country))	MF	4 April 2002 (aged 20)	Academy	2021		10	0
	Papuna Beruashvili	(Georgia (country))	GK	21 March 2004 (aged 18)	Academy	2022		0	0
Left during the season
1	Andrés Prieto	(Spain)	GK	17 October 1993 (aged 29)	Birmingham City	2021	2023	35	0
12	Levan Kharabadze	(Georgia (country))	DF	26 January 2000 (aged 22)	Academy	2018		89	7
15	Giorgi Papava	(Georgia (country))	MF	16 February 1993 (aged 29)	Rustavi	2019	2023 (+1)	182	6
19	Simon Gbegnon	(Togo)	DF	27 October 1992 (aged 30)	Mirandés	2020		71	6

== Transfers ==
=== In ===
Date	Position	Nationality	Name	From	Fee	Ref.
17 December 2021	FW	(Ukraine)	Stanislav Bilenkyi	DAC 1904 Dunajská Streda	Undisclosed	
22 December 2021	FW	(Belarus)	Dmitry Antilevsky	Torpedo-BelAZ Zhodino	Undisclosed	
9 January 2022	FW	(Georgia (country))	Tornike Kirkitadze	Locomotive Tbilisi	Undisclosed	
13 January 2022	FW	(Guinea)	Ousmane Camara	Dila Gori	Undisclosed	
25 June 2022	MF	(Netherlands)	Imran Oulad Omar	Unattached	Free	
9 July 2022	DF	(Georgia (country))	Jemal Tabidze	Unattached	Free	
13 September 2022	GK	(Belarus)	Anton Chichkan	Unattached	Free	

=== Loans in ===
Date from	Position	Nationality	Name	From	Date to	Ref.
18 December 2021	DF	(Nigeria)	Godfrey Stephen	Jagiellonia Białystok	22 December 2022	

=== Out ===
Date	Position	Nationality	Name	To	Fee	Ref.
5 August 2022	DF	(Georgia (country))	Levan Kharabadze	Pafos	Undisclosed	

=== Loans out ===
Date from	Position	Nationality	Name	To	Date to	Ref.
12 January 2022	MF	(Georgia (country))	Nodar Kavtaradze	Saburtalo Tbilisi		
13 January 2022	DF	(Georgia (country))	Davit Kobouri	MFK Karviná	23 June 2022	
28 January 2022	MF	(Georgia (country))	Giorgi Kutsia	Rabotnički	5 June 2022	
January 2022	DF	(Georgia (country))	Giorgi Chkhetiani	Braga	5 June 2022	
26 June 2022	MF	(Georgia (country))	Giorgi Gvishiani	Gagra	31 December 2022	
26 June 2022	MF	(Georgia (country))	Nodar Lominadze	Gagra	31 December 2022	
8 July 2022	GK	(Georgia (country))	Papuna Beruashvili	Sporting CP	30 June 2023	

=== Released ===
Date	Position	Nationality	Name	Joined	Date	Ref.
12 January 2022	GK	(Georgia (country))	Omar Migineishvili	Retired		
12 January 2022	DF	(Georgia (country))	Nodar Iashvili	Saburtalo Tbilisi		
12 January 2022	DF	(Georgia (country))	Giorgi Kimadze	Torpedo Kutaisi		
12 January 2022	MF	(Georgia (country))	Bakar Kardava	Saburtalo Tbilisi		
12 January 2022	MF	(Serbia)	Milan Radin	Dinamo Batumi		
16 January 2022	DF	(Netherlands)	Fabian Sporkslede	Bnei Sakhnin		
22 December 2022	GK	(Belarus)	Anton Chichkan	Dinamo Batumi		
22 December 2022	FW	(Georgia (country))	Giorgi Gabedava	Hapoel Acre		

== Friendlies ==
20 January 2022	Dinamo Tbilisi	2–2	Dinamo Tbilisi II	Tbilisi
GET (UTC+4)	Kirkitadze 3'; Gabedava 66'	Report	Nachkebia 80', 88'

10 June 2022	RFS	2–1	Dinamo Tbilisi	Riga, Latvia
GET (UTC+4)	Diomandé; Lipušček	Report	Kirkitadze

== Competitions ==
=== Overview ===
Competition	First match	Last match	Starting round	Final position	Record							
Competition	First match	Last match	Starting round	Final position	Pld	W	D	L	GF	GA	GD	Win %
Erovnuli Liga	25 February 2022	3 December 2022	Matchday 1	Winners	36	24	8	4	73	29	+44	66.67
Georgian Cup	7 August 2022	2 November 2022	Third round	Semifinal	2	1	1	0	2	1	+1	50.00
UEFA Europa Conference League	7 July 2022	14 July 2022	First qualifying round	First qualifying round	2	1	0	1	4	4	+0	50.00
Total					40	26	9	5	79	34	+45	65.00

Last updated: 3 December 2022
Source: Competitions

=== Erovnuli Liga ===
==== Results summary ====
Overall								Home						Away					
Pld	W	D	L	GF	GA	GD	Pts	W	D	L	GF	GA	GD	W	D	L	GF	GA	GD
36	24	8	4	73	29	+44	80	14	4	0	43	9	+34	10	4	4	30	20	+10

Last updated: 3 December 2022.
Source: See Results

==== Results by round ====
Round	1	2	3	4	5	6	7	8	9	10	11	12	13	14	15	16	17	18	19	20	21	22	23	24	25	26	27	28	29	30	31	32	33	34	35	36
Ground	H	A	H	H	H	A	A	H	A	A	H	A	A	H	A	H	A	H	H	A	H	H	A	H	A	H	A	A	H	A	A	H	A	H	A	H
Result	W	L	W	W	W	D	D	D	L	W	D	W	W	D	W	W	L	W	W	L	W	W	W	W	W	W	W	D	W	W	W	W	W	D	D	W
Position																																				

Source: See Results
A = Away; H = Home; W = Win; D = Draw; L = Loss

==== Results ====
25 February 2022 1	Dinamo Tbilisi	4 – 0	Torpedo Kutaisi	Tbilisi
21:00 GET (UTC+4)	Moistsrapishvili 29'; Bilenkyi 31'; Gbegnon 65'; Camara 90+1'	Report	Kimadze (yellow card) 17'; Nadaraia (yellow card) 72'	Stadium: Boris Paichadze Dinamo Arena; Referee: G.Kruashvili

4 March 2022 2	Dinamo Batumi	3 – 0	Dinamo Tbilisi	Batumi
20:30 GET (UTC+4)	Flamarion 11', 24'; Gaprindashvili (yellow card) 45+3'; Bidzinashvili 63'; Navalovski (yellow card) 80'	Report	Camara (yellow card) 35'; Osei (yellow card) 45+2'; Moistsrapishvili (yellow card) 45+3'; Kalandadze (yellow card) 49'	Stadium: Adjarabet Arena; Referee: I.Kvirikashvili

9 March 2022 3	Dinamo Tbilisi	1 – 0	Sioni Bolnisi	Tbilisi
19:30 GET (UTC+4)	Moistsrapishvili (yellow card) 41'; Osei (yellow card) 50'; Gvishiani (yellow card) 63'; Antilevsky 65'	Report	Potskhveria (yellow card) 33'; Chukwurah (yellow card) 83'; Kilasonia (yellow card) 90'	Stadium: Boris Paichadze Dinamo Arena; Referee: B.Ninua

2 April 2022 6	Dinamo Tbilisi	2 – 1	Locomotive Tbilisi	Tbilisi
21:00 GET (UTC+4)	Antilevsky 28'; Bilenkyi (yellow card) 61'; Kirkitadze 65'; Mali (yellow card) 90+1'	Report	Buighlishvili 42'	Stadium: Boris Paichadze Dinamo Arena; Referee: A.Optional

6 April 2022 4	Dinamo Tbilisi	2 – 1	Dila Gori	Tbilisi
19:00 GET (UTC+4)	Antilevsky 2'; Papava 41'	Report	Gonçalves 62'; (yellow card) 72'	Stadium: Boris Paichadze Dinamo Arena; Referee: G.Kikacheishvili

10 April 2022 7	Telavi	1 – 1	Dinamo Tbilisi	Telavi
19:00 GET (UTC+4)	Pavišić 14'; Mujiri (yellow card) 65'; Khabuliani (yellow card) 82'	Report	Mekvabishvili 4'; Antilevsky (yellow card) 32'; Mali (yellow card) 67'	Stadium: Municipal Stadium; Referee: G.Kruashvili

14 April 2022 5	Saburtalo Tbilisi	1 – 1	Dinamo Tbilisi	Tbilisi
21:00 GET (UTC+4)	Sikharulidze (yellow card) 27'; Kardava 33'; Mioč (yellow card) 50'; Kakubava (yellow card) 80'; S.Nonikashvili (yellow card) 80'	Report	Mekvabishvili (yellow card) 29'; Kalandadze (yellow card) 65'; Gabedava 90+3'	Stadium: Mikheil Meskhi Stadium; Referee: I.Kvirikashvili

18 April 2022 8	Dinamo Tbilisi	0 – 0	Samgurali Tsqaltubo	Tbilisi
19:00 GET (UTC+4)	Camara (yellow card) 69'; Kirkitadze (yellow card) 84'	Report	Kukhianidze (yellow card) 43'; Patarkatsishvili (yellow card) 59'; Rukhadze (yellow card) 90+1'	Stadium: Boris Paichadze Dinamo Arena; Referee: J.Khorava

23 April 2022 9	Gagra	1 – 0	Dinamo Tbilisi	Tbilisi
19:00 GET (UTC+4)	Shonia (yellow card) 68'; Kvirkvia 75'; Parulava (yellow card) 90+5'	Report	Khvadagiani (red card) 24'; Kharabadze (yellow card) 77'; Osei (yellow card) 90+5'	Stadium: Boris Paichadze Dinamo Arena; Referee: A.Optional

29 April 2022 10	Torpedo Kutaisi	0 – 3	Dinamo Tbilisi	Kutaisi
21:00 GET (UTC+4)	Mchedlidze (yellow card) 19'	Report	Gabedava (yellow card) 63'; Kalandadze (yellow card) 88'	Stadium: Ramaz Shengelia Stadium; Referee: A.Nonikashvili
Note: Match was abandoned in the 97th minute due to the crowd trouble. Match later awarded as a 3-0 technical win for Dinamo Tbilisi.

3 May 2022 11	Dinamo Tbilisi	0 – 0	Dinamo Batumi	Tbilisi
21:00 GET (UTC+4)		Report	Teidi (yellow card) 44'; Radin (yellow card) 80'; Palavandishvili (yellow card) 87'	Stadium: Boris Paichadze Dinamo Arena; Referee: G.Kruashvili

8 May 2022 12	Sioni Bolnisi	3 – 7	Dinamo Tbilisi	Tbilisi
16:00 GET (UTC+4)	Nemsadze (yellow card) 6'; N.Khorkheli 21' (yellow card) 83'; L.Khorkheli 24'; Tabatadze 52'	Report	Bilenkyi 4', 34', 90+2'; Camara 18'; Moistsrapishvili (yellow card) 25'; Gabedava 41'; Gbegnon 50'; Osei 58'; Mali (yellow card) 67'; Osikmashvili (yellow card) 69'; Khvadagiani (yellow card) 83'; Stephen (yellow card) 87'	Stadium: Boris Paichadze Dinamo Arena; Referee: D.Kharitonashvili

12 May 2022 13	Dila Gori	0 – 1	Dinamo Tbilisi	Gori
19:00 GET (UTC+4)	Nondi (yellow card) 54'; Kapanadze (yellow card) 77'	Report	Camara 25'; Mekvabishvili (yellow card) 45'; Bilenkyi (yellow card) 54'; Kharabadze (yellow card) 71'	Stadium: Tengiz Burjanadze Stadium; Referee: A.Optional

16 May 2022 14	Dinamo Tbilisi	0 – 0	Saburtalo Tbilisi	Tbilisi
19:00 GET (UTC+4)	Gabedava (yellow card) 83'	Report	L.Nonikashvili (yellow card) 35'	Stadium: Boris Paichadze Dinamo Arena; Referee: G.Kruashvili

21 May 2022 15	Locomotive Tbilisi	0 – 2	Dinamo Tbilisi	Saguramo
17:00 GET (UTC+4)	Samurkasov (yellow card) 59'	Report	Moistsrapishvili 45+2'; Mekvabishvili 65'; Gabedava (yellow card) 77'; Gbegnon (yellow card) 79'	Stadium: Saguramo Football Complex; Referee: K.Giorgadze

25 May 2022 16	Dinamo Tbilisi	3 – 2	Telavi	Tbilisi
19:00 GET (UTC+4)	Patsatsia 28' (o.g.); Camara (yellow card) 37'; Kirkitadze 45'; Bilenkyi 90+5'	Report	Ashortia 38'; Khabuliani 78'	Stadium: Boris Paichadze Dinamo Arena; Referee: I.Kvirikashvili

16 June 2022 17	Samgurali Tsqaltubo	2 – 1	Dinamo Tbilisi	Tsqaltubo
18:00 GET (UTC+4)	Basheleishvili 9'; Kalandarishvili 52'; Kukhianidze (yellow card) 80'	Report	Osei 5'; Skhirtladze (yellow card) 76'	Stadium: 26 May Stadium; Referee: A.Optional

20 June 2022 18	Dinamo Tbilisi	5 – 0	Gagra	Tbilisi
20:00 GET (UTC+4)	Camara 22'; Moistsrapishvili 52' (pen.); Osei 58'; Papava (yellow card) 64'; Mekvabishvili 74'; Skhirtladze 83'	Report	Nozadze (yellow card) 79'	Stadium: Boris Paichadze Dinamo Arena; Referee: I.Kvirikashvili

25 June 2022 19	Dinamo Tbilisi	5 – 1	Torpedo Kutaisi	Tbilisi
21:00 GET (UTC+4)	Bilenkyi 4', 46'; Kirkitadze 57'; Camara 64'; Skhirtladze 77'; Chkhetiani (yellow card) 80'	Report	Mandzhgaladze (yellow card) 76'; Mchedlidze 89'	Stadium: Boris Paichadze Dinamo Arena; Referee: J.Khorava

29 June 2022 20	Dinamo Batumi	4 – 1	Dinamo Tbilisi	Batumi
21:00 GET (UTC+4)	Flamarion 17'; Altunashvili 25'; Teidi 43'; Kobakhidze (yellow card) 74'; Palavandishvili (yellow card) 90+1'; Davitashvili 90+3' (yellow card) 90+4'	Report	Skhirtladze 58'; Mekvabishvili (yellow card) 68'; Khvadagiani (yellow card) 78'	Stadium: Adjarabet Arena; Referee: I.Kvirikashvili

13 August 2022 21	Dinamo Tbilisi	3 – 1	Sioni Bolnisi	Tbilisi
21:00 GET (UTC+4)	Mekvabishvili (yellow card) 62'; Moistsrapishvili 65'; Stephen (yellow card) 69'; Gabedava 77'; Camara 82'	Report	Bekauri 70'	Stadium: Boris Paichadze Dinamo Arena; Referee: A.Optional

20 August 2022 22	Dinamo Tbilisi	3 – 0	Dila Gori	Tbilisi
20:00 GET (UTC+4)	Moistsrapishvili 32'; Mali (yellow card) 34'; Skhirtladze 51'; Gabedava 88'	Report	Nondi (yellow card) 26'; Santos (yellow card) 57'; Batyushyn (yellow card) 85'; Chichinadze (yellow card) 87'	Stadium: Boris Paichadze Dinamo Arena; Referee: G.Kikacheishvili

26 August 2022 23	Saburtalo Tbilisi	1 – 2	Dinamo Tbilisi	Gori
20:00 GET (UTC+4)	Gocholeishvili 32'; Chaduneli (yellow card) 53'; Kakubava (yellow card) 53'	Report	Camara 20'; Omar 26'; Moistsrapishvili (yellow card) 44'; Skhirtladze (yellow card) 53'	Stadium: Tengiz Burjanadze Stadium; Referee: G.Kruashvili

1 September 2022 24	Dinamo Tbilisi	5 – 0	Locomotive Tbilisi	Tbilisi
21:00 GET (UTC+4)	Omar 17', 31'; Bilenkyi 35', 39'; Gabedava 83'	Report	Andronikashvili (yellow card) 48'	Stadium: Boris Paichadze Dinamo Arena; Referee: A.Optional

5 September 2022 25	Telavi	1 – 2	Dinamo Tbilisi	Telavi
20:00 GET (UTC+4)	Kavtaradze 44'; Kochladze (yellow card) 45+1'; Khabuliani (yellow card) 82'	Report	Omar 4'; Kirkitadze 70'; Antilevsky (yellow card) 85'; Kutaladze (yellow card) 90+4'	Stadium: Municipal Stadium; Referee: I.Kvirikashvili

10 September 2022 26	Dinamo Tbilisi	3 – 0	Samgurali Tsqaltubo	Tbilisi
19:00 GET (UTC+4)	Osei 6'; Kirkitadze 7'; Osikmashvili (yellow card) 74'; Bilenkyi 90+4'	Report	Kalandarishvili (yellow card) 82'	Stadium: Boris Paichadze Dinamo Arena; Referee: D.Kharitonashvili

18 September 2022 27	Gagra	0 – 1	Dinamo Tbilisi	Tbilisi
20:00 GET (UTC+4)	Parulava (yellow card) 49'; Nozadze (red card) 74'; Chanturia (yellow card) 77'; Lominadze (yellow card) 79'	Report	Kirkitadze (red card) 6'; Mekvabishvili 50'	Stadium: Boris Paichadze Dinamo Arena; Referee: B.Ninua

2 October 2022 28	Torpedo Kutaisi	0 – 0	Dinamo Tbilisi	Kutaisi
15:30 GET (UTC+4)	Gigauri (yellow card) 29'; Kukhianidze (yellow card) 43'	Report	Khvadagiani (yellow card) 30'	Stadium: Ramaz Shengelia Stadium; Referee: G.Kruashvili

7 October 2022 29	Dinamo Tbilisi	1 – 0	Dinamo Batumi	Tbilisi
21:00 GET (UTC+4)	Osikmashvili (yellow card) 38'; Skhirtladze 69'; Moistsrapishvili (yellow card) 73'; Osei (red card) 79'; Kutaladze (yellow card) 90+7'	Report	Mamuchashvili (yellow card) 84'; Pantsulaia (yellow card) 90+7'	Stadium: Boris Paichadze Dinamo Arena; Referee: I.Kvirikashvili

16 October 2022 30	Sioni Bolnisi	0 – 2	Dinamo Tbilisi	Tbilisi
15:00 GET (UTC+4)	Kikalishvili (yellow card) 27'; Gelashvili (red card) 36'	Report	Kutsia (yellow card) 40'; Mali (yellow card) 51'; Khvadagiani (yellow card) 69'; Skhirtladze 73'; Gabedava 85'	Stadium: Boris Paichadze Dinamo Arena; Referee: G.Kikacheishvili

22 October 2022 31	Dila Gori	2 – 3	Dinamo Tbilisi	Gori
18:00 GET (UTC+4)	Gomis 35'; Kobouri 75' (o.g.); Wanderson (penalty missed) 89'	Report	Kirkitadze (yellow card) 29'; Camara 45+7' (pen.); Tabidze (yellow card) 52'; Omar (yellow card) 55' (goal) 90+4'; Giorgi Maisuradze (yellow card) 86'; Moistsrapishvili 90+2'; Gabedava (yellow card) 90+4'	Stadium: Tengiz Burjanadze Stadium; Referee: D.Kharitonashvili

29 October 2022 32	Dinamo Tbilisi	3 – 1	Saburtalo Tbilisi	Tbilisi
18:00 GET (UTC+4)	Camara 24', 50'; Moistsrapishvili 57'; Tabidze (yellow card) 64'	Report	Sikharulidze 20'; Tabatadze (yellow card) 32'; Goshteliani (yellow card) 56' (yellow-red card) 56'; Mamatsashvili (yellow card) 78'	Stadium: Boris Paichadze Dinamo Arena; Referee: A.Optional

6 November 2022 33	Locomotive Tbilisi	0 – 2	Dinamo Tbilisi	Saguramo
14:00 GET (UTC+4)	Iashvili (yellow card) 29'	Report	Mekvabishvili 6'; Kalandadze (yellow card) 63'; Odisharia 79'	Stadium: Saguramo Football Complex; Referee: I.Serkhadze

10 November 2022 34	Dinamo Tbilisi	1 – 1	Telavi	Tbilisi
18:00 GET (UTC+4)	Omar 21'; Kutaladze (yellow card) 49'; Mali (yellow card) 59'	Report	Kavtaradze 50' (pen.); Piranashvili (yellow card) 90+3'	Stadium: Boris Paichadze Dinamo Arena; Referee: A.Nonikashvili

26 November 2022 35	Samgurali Tsqaltubo	1 – 1	Dinamo Tbilisi	Tsqaltubo
13:30 GET (UTC+4)	Nikabadze 21' (yellow card) 80'; Kalandarishvili (yellow card) 76'; Kukhianidze (yellow card) 90'	Report	Osei (yellow card) 11'; Tabidze (yellow card) 43'; Omar 56'; Mali (yellow card) 86'	Stadium: 26 May Stadium; Referee: I.Kvirikashvili

3 December 2022 36	Dinamo Tbilisi	2 – 1	Gagra	Tbilisi
13:30 GET (UTC+4)	Moistsrapishvili (yellow card) 7'; Khvadagiani (yellow card) 23'; Skhirtladze 28'; Omar 66'; Camara (yellow card) 68'; Mali (yellow card) 81'	Report	Shonia (yellow card) 61'; Makatsaria 73'	Stadium: Boris Paichadze Dinamo Arena; Referee: G.Kruashvili

==== League table ====
Pos	Team	Pld	W	D	L	GF	GA	GD	Pts	Qualification or relegation
1	Dinamo Tbilisi (C)	36	24	8	4	73	29	+44	80	Qualification for the Champions League first qualifying round
2	Dinamo Batumi	36	23	8	5	87	34	+53	77	Qualification for the Europa Conference League first qualifying round
3	Dila Gori	36	17	8	11	48	35	+13	59	Qualification for the Europa Conference League first qualifying round
4	Samgurali Tsqaltubo	36	15	12	9	55	44	+11	57	
5	Torpedo Kutaisi (Note: «Torpedo Kutaisi qualified for the Europa Conference League first qualifying round as 2022 Georgian Cup winner)	36	15	9	12	48	48	0	54	Qualification for the Europa Conference League first qualifying round

Source: Erovnuli Liga, Soccerway
Rules for classification: 1) Points; 2) Head-to-head points; 3) Head-to-head goal difference; 4) Head-to-head goals scored; 5) Head-to-head away goals scored (only if two teams); 6) Goal difference; 7) Goals scored.
(C) Champions

=== Georgian Cup ===
7 August 2022 Third Round	Samtredia	1 – 2	Dinamo Tbilisi	Samtredia
17:00 GET (UTC+4)	Barabadze 90+4'	Report	Antilevsky 37'; Osikmashvili (yellow card) 69'; Bilenkyi 70'	Stadium: Erosi Manjgaladze Stadium; Referee: I.Kvirikashvili

14 September 2022 Round of 16	Dinamo Batumi	0 – 0 (a.e.t.) (0 – 3 p)	Dinamo Tbilisi	Batumi
21:00 GET (UTC+4)	Chabradze (yellow card) 86'; Palavandishvili (yellow card) 119'	Report	Camara (yellow card) 31'; Kirkitadze (yellow card) 32'	Stadium: Adjarabet Arena; Referee: G.Kruashvili
	Penalties
	Mamuchashvili (penalty missed); Palavandishvili (penalty missed); Chabradze (penalty missed)		(penalty scored) Tabidze; (penalty scored) Camara; (penalty missed) Omar; (penalty scored) Moistsrapishvili

12 October 2022 Quarterfinal	Dinamo Tbilisi	2 – 1	Dila Gori	Tbilisi
19:00 GET (UTC+4)	Camara 30'; Omar 74'	Report	Kapanadze 28'; Mosiashvili (yellow card) 73'; Santos (yellow card) 80'	Stadium: Boris Paichadze Dinamo Arena; Referee: A.Optional

2 November 2022 Semifinal	Torpedo Kutaisi	2 – 0	Dinamo Tbilisi	Zestaponi
13:00 GET (UTC+4)	Monteiro 56'; Mandzhgaladze (yellow card) 68'; Caballero 73'	Report		Stadium: David Abashidze Stadium; Referee: D.Kharitonashvili

=== UEFA Europa Conference League ===
==== Qualifying rounds ====
7 July 2022 First qualifying round 1st leg	Dinamo Tbilisi (Georgia (country))	2 – 3	(Estonia) Paide Linnameeskond	Tbilisi, Georgia
21:00 GET (UTC+4)	Skhirtladze 22'; Kharabadze 65'; Kalandadze (yellow card) 88'	Report	S.Luts 61'; Singhateh 81'; Piht 89'	Stadium: Boris Paichadze Dinamo Arena; Attendance: 4,530; Referee: Miloš Bošković (Montenegro)

14 July 2022 First qualifying round 2nd leg	Paide Linnameeskond (Estonia)	1 – 2 (a.e.t.) (4 – 4 agg.) (6 – 5 p)	(Georgia (country)) Dinamo Tbilisi	Pärnu, Estonia
20:00 GET (UTC+4)	Mööl (yellow card) 91'; Singhateh 115' (pen.) (yellow card) 116'	Report	Osei (yellow card) 45+1'; Skhirtladze 69'; Antilevsky 93'; Gabedava (yellow card) 105'	Stadium: Pärnu Rannastaadion; Attendance: 1,440; Referee: Svein Oddvar Moen (Norway)
	Penalties
	Mošnikov (penalty scored); Palumets (penalty scored); Tambedou (penalty scored); Saarma (penalty scored); Singhateh (penalty scored); Piht (penalty scored)		(penalty scored) Antilevsky; (penalty scored) Kutsia; (penalty scored) Barnes; (penalty scored) Camara; (penalty scored) Gabedava; (penalty missed) Kharabadze
Note: Paide Linnameeskond played their home matches at the Pärnu Rannastaadion in Pärnu instead of their regular stadium, the Paide linnastaadion, in Paide, which did not meet UEFA requirements.

== Squad statistics ==
As of match played 3 December 2022

=== Appearances and goals ===
No.	Pos	Nat	Player	Total		Erovnuli Liga		Georgian Cup		UEFA Europa Conference League	
No.	Pos	Nat	Player	Apps	Goals	Apps	Goals	Apps	Goals	Apps	Goals
2	DF	(Georgia (country)) GEO	Nikoloz Mali	41	0	35	0	4	0	2	0
3	DF	(Georgia (country)) GEO	Aleksandre Kalandadze	34	0	26+3	0	3	0	1+1	0
4	DF	(Georgia (country)) GEO	Saba Khvadagiani	26	0	18+6	0	2	0	0	0
5	MF	(Georgia (country)) GEO	Anzor Mekvabishvili	34	5	30+1	5	2	0	1	0
6	MF	(Netherlands) NED	Imran Oulad Omar	22	9	14+2	8	1+3	1	1+1	0
7	FW	(Georgia (country)) GEO	Davit Skhirtladze	28	9	12+11	7	2+1	0	2	2
8	MF	(Georgia (country)) GEO	Giorgi Moistsrapishvili	35	7	22+8	7	2+1	0	1+1	0
9	FW	(Georgia (country)) GEO	Giorgi Gabedava	28	6	4+21	6	0+2	0	0+1	0
11	FW	(Ukraine) UKR	Stanislav Bilenkyi	32	11	17+12	10	2	1	0+1	0
13	DF	(Georgia (country)) GEO	Jemal Tabidze	15	0	12	0	3	0	0	0
16	MF	(Georgia (country)) GEO	Levan Osikmashvili	24	0	9+10	0	3	0	2	0
18	FW	(Ghana) GHA	Barnes Osei	31	4	21+7	4	0+1	0	2	0
20	DF	(Georgia (country)) GEO	Giorgi Chkhetiani	3	0	0+2	0	0	0	0+1	0
20	DF	(Georgia (country)) GEO	Temur Gognadze	1	0	0	0	0+1	0	0	0
21	MF	(Georgia (country)) GEO	Giorgi Kutsia	15	0	3+9	0	1+1	0	0+1	0
22	DF	(Nigeria) NGR	Godfrey Stephen	14	0	5+8	0	0+1	0	0	0
23	MF	(Georgia (country)) GEO	Tornike Kirkitadze	36	5	20+10	5	3+1	0	2	0
24	DF	(Georgia (country)) GEO	Davit Kobouri	22	0	14+2	0	4	0	1+1	0
26	MF	(Georgia (country)) GEO	Luka Parkadze	3	0	0+3	0	0	0	0	0
28	FW	(Guinea) GUI	Ousmane Camara	42	11	34+2	10	4	1	1+1	0
30	GK	(Georgia (country)) GEO	Luka Kutaladze	15	0	11+1	0	3	0	0	0
31	DF	(Georgia (country)) GEO	Giorgi Maisuradze	14	0	2+10	0	0+2	0	0	0
33	GK	(Georgia (country)) GEO	Davit Kereselidze	8	0	7	0	1	0	0	0
34	DF	(Georgia (country)) GEO	Luka Latsabidze	1	0	0	0	0+1	0	0	0
38	MF	(Georgia (country)) GEO	Gabriel Sigua	12	0	2+7	0	2+1	0	0	0
39	FW	(Georgia (country)) GEO	Lasha Odisharia	8	1	1+6	1	0+1	0	0	0
40	FW	(Belarus) BLR	Dmitry Antilevsky	29	4	14+10	3	1+3	1	0+1	0
Players away from Dinamo Tbilisi on loan:
6	MF	(Georgia (country)) GEO	Nodar Lominadze	9	0	3+6	0	0	0	0	0
29	MF	(Georgia (country)) GEO	Giorgi Gvishiani	2	0	0+2	0	0	0	0	0
Players who left Dinamo Tbilisi during the season:
1	GK	(Spain) ESP	Andrés Prieto	21	0	18+1	0	0	0	2	0
12	DF	(Georgia (country)) GEO	Levan Kharabadze	19	1	13+4	0	0	0	2	1
15	MF	(Georgia (country)) GEO	Giorgi Papava	15	1	10+5	1	0	0	0	0
19	DF	(Togo) TOG	Simon Gbegnon	22	2	19+1	2	0	0	2	0

=== Goal scorers ===
Place	Position	Nation	Number	Name	Erovnuli Liga	Georgian Cup	UEFA Europa Conference League	Total
1	FW	(Ukraine)	11	Stanislav Bilenkyi	10	1	0	11
1	FW	(Guinea)	28	Ousmane Camara	10	1	0	11
3	MF	(Netherlands)	6	Imran Oulad Omar	8	1	0	9
3	FW	(Georgia (country))	7	Davit Skhirtladze	7	0	2	9
5	MF	(Georgia (country))	8	Giorgi Moistsrapishvili	7	0	0	7
6	FW	(Georgia (country))	9	Giorgi Gabedava	6	0	0	6
7	MF	(Georgia (country))	5	Anzor Mekvabishvili	5	0	0	5
7	MF	(Georgia (country))	23	Tornike Kirkitadze	5	0	0	5
7	FW	(Belarus)	40	Dmitry Antilevsky	3	1	1	5
10	FW	(Ghana)	18	Barnes Osei	4	0	0	4
11	DF	(Togo)	19	Simon Gbegnon	2	0	0	2
14	MF	(Georgia (country))	15	Giorgi Papava	1	0	0	1
14	FW	(Georgia (country))	39	Lasha Odisharia	1	0	0	1
14	DF	(Georgia (country))	12	Levan Kharabadze	0	0	1	1
14				Own goal	1	0	0	1
				Awarded	3	0	0	3
				TOTALS	73	4	4	81

=== Clean sheets ===
Place	Position	Nation	Number	Name	Erovnuli Liga	Georgian Cup	UEFA Europa Conference League	Total
1	GK	(Spain)	1	Andrés Prieto	8	0	0	8
2	GK	(Georgia (country))	30	Luka Kutaladze	6	1	0	7
3	GK	(Georgia (country))	33	Davit Kereselidze	3	0	0	3
				TOTALS	17	1	0	18

=== Disciplinary record ===
Number	Nation	Position	Name	Erovnuli Liga		Georgian Cup		UEFA Europa Conference League		Total	
Number	Nation	Position	Name	Yellow card	Red card	Yellow card	Red card	Yellow card	Red card	Yellow card	Red card
2	(Georgia (country))	DF	Nikoloz Mali	8	0	0	0	0	0	8	0
3	(Georgia (country))	DF	Aleksandre Kalandadze	4	0	0	0	1	0	5	0
4	(Georgia (country))	DF	Saba Khvadagiani	5	1	0	0	0	0	5	1
5	(Georgia (country))	MF	Anzor Mekvabishvili	4	0	0	0	0	0	4	0
6	(Netherlands)	MF	Imran Oulad Omar	1	0	0	0	0	0	1	0
7	(Georgia (country))	FW	Davit Skhirtladze	2	0	0	0	0	0	2	0
8	(Georgia (country))	MF	Giorgi Moistsrapishvili	6	0	0	0	0	0	6	0
9	(Georgia (country))	FW	Giorgi Gabedava	4	0	0	0	1	0	5	0
11	(Ukraine)	FW	Stanislav Bilenkyi	2	0	0	0	0	0	2	0
13	(Georgia (country))	DF	Jemal Tabidze	3	0	0	0	0	0	3	0
16	(Georgia (country))	MF	Levan Osikmashvili	4	0	1	0	0	0	5	0
18	(Ghana)	FW	Barnes Osei	4	1	0	0	1	0	5	1
20	(Georgia (country))	DF	Giorgi Chkhetiani	1	0	0	0	0	0	1	0
21	(Georgia (country))	MF	Giorgi Kutsia	1	0	0	0	0	0	1	0
22	(Nigeria)	DF	Godfrey Stephen	2	0	0	0	0	0	2	0
23	(Georgia (country))	MF	Tornike Kirkitadze	2	1	1	0	0	0	3	1
28	(Guinea)	FW	Ousmane Camara	4	0	1	0	0	0	5	0
29	(Georgia (country))	MF	Giorgi Gvishiani	1	0	0	0	0	0	1	0
30	(Georgia (country))	GK	Luka Kutaladze	3	0	0	0	0	0	3	0
31	(Georgia (country))	DF	Giorgi Maisuradze	1	0	0	0	0	0	1	0
40	(Belarus)	FW	Dmitry Antilevsky	2	0	0	0	0	0	2	0
Players away on loan:
Players who left Dinamo Tbilisi during the season:
12	(Georgia (country))	DF	Levan Kharabadze	1	0	0	0	0	0	1	0
15	(Georgia (country))	MF	Giorgi Papava	1	0	0	0	0	0	1	0
19	(Togo)	DF	Simon Gbegnon	1	0	0	0	0	0	1	0
			TOTALS	67	3	3	0	3	0	73	3
