= Mujiri =

Mujiri (Georgian: მუჯირი) is a Georgian surname that may refer to:

- Shio Mujiri (b. 1969), Catholicos Patriarch of All George, Archbishop of Mtskheta-Tbilisi and Metropolitan Bishop of Bichvinta and Tskhum-Abkhazia
- Jaba Mujiri (b. 1980), Georgian football player
- Davit Mujiri (b. 1978), Georgian football player
- Amiran Mujiri (b. 1974), Georgian football player
- David Mujiri (b. 1999), Georgian football player
