= 2022 Erovnuli Liga 2 =

Georgian second tier football season

Erovnuli Liga 2
- Season: 2022
- Dates: 1 March – 2 December
- Champions: Shukura (5th title)
- Promoted: Shukura; Samtredia
- Relegated: Rustavi; Dinamo Zugdidi; Shevardeni 1906
- Matches: 112
- Goals: 343 (3.06 per match)
- Top goalscorer: Levan Papava (17 goals)
- Biggest home win: Samtredia 6–0 Merani T (26 June)
- Biggest away win: WIT Georgia 1–5 Spaeri (28 August); Merani T 0–4 Spaeri (1 October); Merani M 0–4 Shukura (22 October); Rustavi 1–5 Spaeri (1 November)
- Highest scoring: WIT Georgia 5-3 Merani M (9 October)
- Longest winning run: Samtredia (6 games)
- Longest unbeaten run: Spaeri (9)
- Longest winless run: WIT Georgia (12)
- Longest losing run: WIT Georgia (5)
- All statistics correct as of 10 December 2022.

The 2022 Erovnuli Liga 2 was the sixth season under its current title and the 34th season of second-tier football in Georgia. The four-round competition began on 1 March and ended on 2 December with playoffs completed on 12 December.

== Format ==
The winner gain automatic promotion to Erovnuli Liga, while the next two teams participate in play-offs against their top-flight rivals.

After the initial 13 rounds, an extraordinary situation in late May resulted in early relegation of two clubs to the third tier. Among the remaining eight clubs the bottom two enter a play-off contest against 3rd and 4th teams of Liga 3 at the end of the season. A two-legged tie will be played at each side's home ground.

Each team played 28 matches in this shortened season.

== Team changes ==
The following teams have changed division since the 2021 season:

=== To Erovnuli Liga 2 ===
Promoted from Liga 3

• Spaeri Tbilisi

Relegated from Erovnuli Liga

• Shukura Kobuleti

• Samtredia

=== From Erovnuli Liga 2 ===
Promoted to Erovnuli Liga

• Sioni Bolnisi

• Gagra

Relegated to Liga 3

• Chikhura Sachkhere

== Teams and stadiums ==
Location of Liga 2 football clubs in 2022

The participants of Liga 2 this season are listed below in alphabetical order.

Apart from Gareji Sagarejo and Spaeri Tbilisi, all of them have previously taken part in the main division. Among them are WIT Georgia and Samtredia, who have been the top-tier champions.

Club	Position last season	City	Venue	Capacity
Dinamo Zugdidi	7th	Zugdidi	Ganmukhuri, Centraluri	2,000
Gareji	4th	Sagarejo	Centraluri	2,000
Merani Martvili	3rd	Martvili	Murtaz Khurtsilava Stadium	2,000
Merani Tbilisi	5th	Tbilisi	Spaeri	2,500
Rustavi	9th	Rustavi	Technical Centre	1,000
Samtredia	10th in Liga 1	Samtredia	Erosi Manjgaladze Stadium	5,000
Shevardeni-1906	6th	Tbilisi	Kaspi, Centraluri	500
Shukura	9th in Liga 1	Kobuleti	Chele Arena	6,000
Spaeri	1st in Liga 3	Tbilisi	Spaeri	2,500
WIT Georgia	8th	Tbilisi	Gldani Football Centre	1,000

NOTE: Based on decision made by GFF Disciplinary Committee, Dinamo Zugdidi and Shevardeni-1906 were accused of match-fixing and expelled from the league with immediate effect on 22 May. For this reason all their team or individual records have been annulled from the statistics.

== Personnel and kits ==
Club	Captain	Head Coach	Manager's date of appointment	Kit manufacturer
Dinamo Zugdidi	Vakhtang Jomidava	Jano Makatsaria	January 2022	(Spain) Kelme
Gareji	Nikoloz Nozadze	Giorgi Oniani	September 2022	(Italy) Erreà
Merani Martvili	Kichi Meliava	Varlam Kilasonia	July 2022	(Spain) Joma
Merani Tbilisi	Iago Deisadze	Avtandil Shengelia	September 2021	(Germany) Jako
Rustavi	Paata Kiteishvili	Valeri Abramidze	November 2022	(Spain) Kelme
Samtredia	Givi Ioseliani	Giorgi Shashiashvili	February 2022	(Spain) Joma
Shevardeni-1906	Nikoloz Jishkariani	Giorgi Daraselia	February 2022	(Spain) Kelme
Shukura	Irakli Komakhidze	Revaz Gotsiridze	January 2022	(Spain) Kelme
Spaeri	Levan Papava	Kakha Maisuradze	2017	(Spain) Kelme
WIT Georgia	Irakli Zaridze	Levan Jobava	June 2021	(Italy) Erreà

== Managerial changes ==
Team	Outgoing manager	Date of vacancy	Incoming manager
Shevardeni-1906	Ioseb Chikadze	9 March	Davit Datuadze
Shevardeni-1906	Davit Datuadze	1 April	Giorgi Daraselia
Gareji Sagarejo	Kakhaber Gogichaishvili	8 April	Nestor Mumladze (Interim)
Gareji Sagarejo	Nestor Mumladze	7 May	Temur Makharadze
Gareji Sagarejo	Temur Makharadze	12 June	Davit Dighmelashvili
Gareji Sagarejo	Davit Dighmelashvili	30 September	Giorgi Oniani
Rustavi	Armaz Jeladze	3 May	Levan Jokhadze
Rustavi	Levan Jokhadze	2 November	Valeri Abramidze
Merani Martvili	Tsotne Moniava	15 July	Varlam Kilasonia

== League table ==
Pos	Team	Pld	W	D	L	GF	GA	GD	Pts	Promotion, qualification or relegation
1	Shukura Kobuleti (C, P)	28	19	3	6	52	23	+29	60	Promotion to Erovnuli Liga
2	Spaeri	28	15	6	7	57	35	+22	51	Qualification for Promotion play-offs
3	Samtredia (P)	28	14	6	8	43	28	+15	48	Qualification for Promotion play-offs
4	Merani Martvili	28	12	6	10	55	53	+2	42	
5	Gareji Sagarejo	28	10	6	12	38	36	+2	36	
6	Merani Tbilisi	28	10	4	14	34	56	−22	34	
7	Rustavi (R)	28	6	5	17	34	54	−20	23	Qualification for Relegation play-offs
8	WIT Georgia	28	5	6	17	30	58	−28	21	Qualification for Relegation play-offs
9	Dinamo Zugdidi (R)	0	0	0	0	0	0	0	0	Clubs Expelled to Liga 3
10	Shevardeni-1906 (R)	0	0	0	0	0	0	0	0	Clubs Expelled to Liga 3

Rules for classification: 1) Points; 2) Head-to-head points; 3) Head-to-head goal difference; 4) Head-to-head goals scored; 5) Head-to-head away goals scored (only if two teams); 6) Goal difference; 7) Goals scored. On 21 May, the GFF announced the expulsion of Shevardeni-1906 and Dinamo Zugdidi from League 2 for match fixing and betting fraud. All matches they played have been annulled.
(C) Champions; (P) Promoted; (R) Relegated

== Results ==
=== Regular season ===
==== Round 1-14 ====
Home \ Away	SHU	SAM	GAR	MAR	MER	RUS	SPA	WIT
Shukura	—	0–0	3–1	1–3	3–0	3–0	3–1	3–0
Samtredia	0–1	—	0–0	3–1	6–0	2–1	2–2	3–1
Gareji	1–1	2–0	—	2–2	1–1	1–2	2–0	1–1
Merani M	2–3	3–1	1–0	—	4–2	3–2	2–3	2–2
Merani Tbilisi	0–2	1–0	3–1	2–1	—	3–2	1–0	2–1
Rustavi	1–3	1–1	2–0	2–2	1–1	—	0–2	0–0
Spaeri	2–1	0–1	3–2	1–1	2–2	2–1	—	3–1
WIT Georgia	1–3	0–0	0–2	1–2	1–0	2–0	1–1	—

Source: Liga 2 results
Legend: Blue = home team win; Yellow = draw; Red = away team win.

==== Round 15-28 ====
Home \ Away	SHU	SAM	GAR	MAR	MER	RUS	SPA	WIT
Shukura	—	3–0	3–0	1–2	1–0	2–1	0–2	1–2
Samtredia	0–1	—	2–0	1–0	4–1	1–0	2–1	3–0
Gareji	1–2	4–0	—	0–0	2–1	4–0	1–3	1–0
Merani M	0–4	1–2	3–2	—	1–2	3–2	1–2	4–2
Merani Tbilisi	0–1	0–3	1–0	2–2	—	1–2	0–4	3–1
Rustavi	1–3	2–1	2–3	1–2	4–0	—	1–5	2–1
Spaeri	0–0	1–1	0–2	2–4	4–2	2–0	—	4–0
WIT Georgia	2–0	1–4	0–2	5–3	2–3	1–1	1–5	—

Source: Liga 2 results
Legend: Blue = home team win; Yellow = draw; Red = away team win.

=== Results by round ===
In order to preserve chronological progress, postponed matches are not included in the round at which they were originally scheduled. Instead they are added to the full round played immediately afterwards.

Team ╲ Round	1	2	3	4	5	6	7	8	9	10	11	12	13	14	15	16	17	18	19	20	21	22	23	24	25	26	27	28
Gareji	L	L	D	D	D	D	L	D	L	L	W	W	L	W	L	W	L	W	L	W	W	L	L	D	W	W	W	L
Merani M	W	W	L	W	W	W	L	D	D	W	D	L	L	D	W	W	W	L	W	L	L	W	L	D	D	L	L	W
Merani Tbilisi	W	W	D	W	L	W	L	D	W	L	D	W	L	L	W	L	L	W	W	L	L	W	L	L	D	L	L	L
Rustavi	L	D	W	L	L	L	L	D	L	W	L	D	L	D	L	W	L	W	D	L	L	L	W	L	L	W	L	L
Samtredia	D	D	L	W	L	D	L	W	W	D	D	W	L	W	D	L	W	L	L	W	W	W	W	W	W	L	W	W
Shukura	W	W	W	W	L	D	W	W	D	W	L	W	W	W	W	L	W	L	W	L	W	W	W	W	D	W	L	W
Spaeri	L	D	L	L	W	W	W	D	W	D	W	W	D	L	D	W	W	W	L	W	L	L	W	W	D	W	W	W
WIT Georgia	D	L	D	L	D	W	W	L	L	L	D	L	L	D	L	L	L	L	D	W	W	L	L	L	L	L	W	L

Updated to match(es) played on 2 December. Source: Georgian Football Federation
W = Win; D = Draw; L = Lose

== Statistics ==
=== Top scorers ===
As of 2 December 2022

Rank	Player	Club	Goals
1	(Georgia (country)) Levan Papava	Spaeri Tbilisi	17
2	(Mali) Cheikne Sylla	Merani Martvili	16
3	(Georgia (country)) Giorgi Kharebashvili	Gareji Sagarejo	12
4	(Georgia (country)) Zurab Museliani	Shukura Kobuleti	12
5	(South Africa) Bantu Mzwakali	Rustavi	9
6	(Georgia (country)) Amiran Dzagania	WIT Georgia	8
7	(Georgia (country)) Dato Kirkitadze	Samtredia	8
8	(Georgia (country)) Papuna Poniava	Merani Martvili	8
9	(Cameroon) Cyrille Tchamba	Samtredia	7
10	(Georgia (country)) Levan Ingorokva	Shukura Kobuleti	7

=== Assists ===
As of 2 December 2022

Rank	Player	Club	Assists
1	(Georgia (country)) Giorgi Janelidze	Shukura	9
2	(Georgia (country)) Giorgi Kharebashvili	Gareji	7
3	(Georgia (country)) Tsotne Patsatsia	Merani Martvili	7
4	(Georgia (country)) Levan Tsotsonava	Merani Martvili	7
5	(Georgia (country)) Levan Papava	Spaeri	7
6	(Georgia (country)) Giorgi Koripadze	Samtredia	7

=== Clean sheets ===
As of 2 December 2022

Rank	Player	Club	Clean sheets
1	(Georgia (country)) Luka Kharatishvili	Shukura	13
2	(Georgia (country)) Konstantine Sepiashvili	Gareji	6
3	(Belarus) Yaroslav Burychenkov	Samtredia	6
4	(Georgia (country)) Guram Chikashua	WIT Georgia	5
5	(Georgia (country)) Davit Kupatadze	Gareji	4
6	(Georgia (country)) Nikoloz Abashidze	Spaeri	4
7	(Uruguay) Facundo Silva	Samtredia	4

=== Hat-tricks ===
As of 2 December 2022

Player	For	Against	Result	Date
(Georgia (country)) Jaba Kasrelishvili	Merani Tbilisi	Rustavi	3–2 (H)	1 April
(Japan) Yuta Nakano	Rustavi	Merani Tbilisi	4–0 (H)	28 August

=== Discipline ===
Red cards

As of 2 December 2022

• Merani Tbilisi – 6

• Spaeri – 5

• Merani Martvili, Gareji – 3

== Promotion playoffs ==
7 December
13:00 UTC+4

Samtredia	1–0	Sioni
Kilasonia 79' (pen.)	Report

Erosi Manjgaladze Stadium, Samtredia
Referee: G.Kruashvili
11 December
13:00 UTC+4

Sioni	0–2	Samtredia
	Report	Tchamba 9', 74'

Tamaz Stepania Stadium, Bolnisi
Referee: D.Kharitonashvili

Samtredia won 3–0 on aggregate.

8 December
13:00 UTC+4

Gagra	2–0	Spaeri
Nozadze 8'; Makatsaria 63'	Report

Boris Paichadze Dinamo Arena, Tbilisi
Referee: I.Kvirikashvili
12 December
13:00 UTC+4

Spaeri	3–1 (a.e.t.)	Gagra
Tsatskrialashvili 35'; Papava 48' (pen.), 98'	Report	Makatsaria 95' (pen.)
Penalties
(penalty scored) Papava; (penalty missed) Mathenjwa; (penalty scored) Khojanashvili; (penalty scored) Odishelidze; (penalty scored) Kirkitadze; (penalty missed) Askurava	4–5	(penalty scored) Khositashvili; (penalty scored) Lomtadze; (penalty scored) Sultanishvili; (penalty scored) Lominadze; (penalty missed) Parulava; (penalty scored) Shetsiruli

Spaeri Stadium, Tbilisi
Referee: J.Khorava

Spaeri lost on penalties.

== Relegation playoffs ==
6 December
13:00 UTC+4

WIT Georgia	0–0	Aragvi
	Report

Gldani Football Centre, Tbilisi
Referee: G.Avazashvili
10 December
13:00 UTC+4

Aragvi	0–1	WIT Georgia
	Report	Nachkebia 45'

Marakana, Tbilisi
Referee: B.Ninua

WIT Georgia won 1–0 on aggregate and remained in the league.

6 December
13:00 UTC+4

Kolkheti Khobi	1–0	Rustavi
Chedia 8'	Report

Paata Tatarishvili Stadium, Khobi
Referee: G.Kikacheishvili
10 December
13:00 UTC+4

Rustavi	0–1	Kolkheti Khobi
	Report	Toradze 72'

Technikuri Centri, Rustavi
Referee: A.Nonikashvili

Rustavi lost 0–2 on aggregate and suffered relegation.
