= David Mujiri =

David Mujiri may refer to:

- Davit Mujiri (born 1978), Georgian footballer
- David Mujiri (footballer, born 1999), Georgian footballer
