= Levan Papava =

Georgian association football player

Personal information
- Date of birth: 2 November 1993 (age 32)
- Place of birth: Georgia
- Height: 1.85 m (6 ft 1 in)
- Position: Forward

Team information
- Current team: Shturmi

Senior career*
Years	Team	Apps	(Gls)
2013–2014	Mark Stars	29	(21)
2014–2015	Algeti	28	(6)
2015–2018	Gagra	111	(32)
2019	Guria	16	(2)
2020–2022	Spaeri	75	(56)
2023–2025	Gareji	107	(61)
2026	Samgurali	17	(1)
2026–	Shturmi	0	(0)
- * Club domestic league appearances and goals as of 10 July 2026

Levan Papava (Georgian: ლევან პაპავა, born 2 November 1993) is a Georgian footballer who plays as a forward for Erovnuli Liga 2 club Shturmi.

He is the four-time best goalscorer of the Erovnuli Liga 2 with three different clubs.

== Career ==
Papava started his professional career at Mark Stars in Meore Liga. In 2013–14, he displayed his goalscoring abilities for the first time, netting 21 times in 29 games during a season in which his team slipped up at the very end of a long promotion battle and finished just one point behind group leaders Borjomi.

In the summer of 2015, Papava moved to second-division side Gagra where he remained for next four seasons. His first success came a year later. With 13 goals scored in 14 league games, Papava became the top scorer of the 2016 season. He was a member of the squad that reached the cup final in 2018.

Following a year-long tenure at Guria, Papava joined Liga 3 club Spaeri in 2020. In his first season, he scored nearly half of the team goals (15 out of 31) while wearing a captain's armband. The next year saw Spaeri winning the league with Papava leading the goalscorers list with 23 goals in 26 matches. On 18 November 2021, he netted four in a 5–0 win over Kolkheti Khobi.

The player continued to extend his record as the most prolific marksman in 2022. As Spaeri came second in their debut season in Liga 2, Papava beat his rivals in a goalscoring race again with 18 goals. In a decisive play-off game held on 12 December 2022, Papava scored twice, added another in penalty shootout, although Spaeri failed to overcome Gagra.

In early 2023, Papava moved to 2nd division side Gareji. The club managed to make a historic achievement by winning the top-flight promotion in 2024. As a team captain, Papava took part in all 72 league games during this two-year period, bagging 50 goals in total. It included 13 goals in ten successive league games in the autumn of 2024. In addition, he played a key role in knocking out two Erovnuli Liga clubs, Samtredia and Dila, from the cup competition, scoring a hat-trick in a 5–0 demolition of the former.

After three consecutive individual achievements as a topscorer in the 2nd tier, Papava as well as his club made their Erovnuli Liga debut in a goalless draw against Dinamo Batumi on 6 March 2025. Ten days later, he netted a historic winner against Kolkheti 1913. Papava finished the season among the top five goalscorers with 11 league goals.

== Statistics ==
As of match played 23 June 2026

Appearances and goals by club, season and competition
Club	Season	League			National cup		Continental		Other		Total	
Club	Season	Division	Apps	Goals	Apps	Goals	Apps	Goals	Apps	Goals	Apps	Goals
Mark Stars	2013–14	Meore Liga	29	21	–		–		–		29	21
Algeti	2014–15	Pirveli Liga	28	6	–		–		–		28	6
Gagra	2015–16	Pirveli Liga	34	9	–		–		–		34	9
Gagra	2016	Pirveli Liga	14	13	1	0	–		–		15	13
Gagra	2017	Erovnuli Liga 2	30	5	1	0	–		–		31	5
Gagra	2018	Erovnuli Liga 2	33	5	4	0	–		2 (Note: Appearances in Erovnuli Liga playoffs)	0	39	5
Gagra	Total		111	32	6	0	0	0	2	0	119	32
Spaeri	2020	Liga 3	18	15	3	4	–		–		21	19
Spaeri	2021	Liga 3	26	23	2	2	–		–		28	25
Spaeri	2022	Erovnuli Liga 2	31	18	2	1	–		2	2	35	21
Spaeri	Total		75	56	7	7	0	0	2	2	84	65
Gareji	2023	Erovnuli Liga 2	36	23	2	0	–		2	3	40	26
Gareji	2024	Erovnuli Liga 2	36	27	3	4	–		–		39	31
Gareji	2025	Erovnuli Liga	35	11	–		–		2	2	37	13
Gareji	Total		107	61	5	4	0	0	4	5	116	70
Samgurali	2026	Erovnuli Liga	17	1	–		–		–			
Career total			367	177	18	11	0	0	8	7	393	195

== Honours ==
=== Club ===
Gareji

- Erovnuli Liga 2 winner: 2024

Spaeri

- Liga 3 winner: 2021

=== Individual ===
- Pirveli Liga / Erovnuli Liga 2 topscorer: 2016, 2022, 2023, 2024
