= Luka Kharatishvili =

Georgian footballer (born 2003)

Personal information
- Date of birth: 11 January 2003 (age 23)
- Place of birth: Georgia
- Height: 1.90 m (6 ft 3 in)
- Position: Goalkeeper

Team information
- Current team: Pardubice
- Number: 99

Youth career
- Norchi Dinamo
- GFF Academy

Senior career*
Years	Team	Apps	(Gls)
2020–2026	Dinamo Batumi	34	(0)
2022	→ Shukura (loan)	31	(0)
2023	→ Samtredia (loan)	12	(0)
2025–2026	→ Pardubice (loan)	11	(0)
2025	→ Pardubice B (loan)	3	(0)
2026–	Pardubice	0	(0)

International career^{‡}
2018–2019	Georgia U17	4	(0)
2021–2022	Georgia U19	11	(0)
2022–2025	Georgia U21	18	(0)
- * Club domestic league appearances and goals as of 27 May 2026 ‡ National team caps and goals as of 18 June 2025

Luka Kharatishvili (Georgian: ლუკა ხარატიშვილი; born 11 January 2003) is a Georgian professional footballer who plays as a goalkeeper for Czech First League club Pardubice.

He was a member of each of the national youth teams and participant of the 2025 UEFA European Under-21 Championship.

== Club career ==
Kharatishvili took first steps in football at Norchi Dinamo at the age of six. Initially, he played as a left back. Later he joined the GFF Academy before signing a contract with Dinamo Batumi in 2020. As his new club won their first top-league title the next year, Kharatishvili was loaned to fellow Adjarian 2nd division club Shukura on a year-long deal. He made a solid contribution to Shukura's victorious season with 13 clean sheets in 31 league matches.

Kharatishvili played three league games with Dinamo Batumi in early 2023 prior to joining Samtredia on loan in the summer. Overall, he participated in Samtredia's 14 matches and helped them to avoid relegation after a 5–4 aggregate play-off victory over Gareji.

Kharatishvili rejoined the reigning league champions Dinamo Batumi in January 2024.

On 8 September 2025, Kharatishvili joined Czech First League club Pardubice on a one-year loan deal with an option to make the transfer permanent.

== International ==
Kharatishvili was regularly called up to national youth teams starting from U15s in 2017. A year later, he took part in 2019 U17 European Championship qualifiers in Denmark.

In 2021, Kharatishvili became a member of the U19 team, taking part in their 2022 European Championship qualifying campaign. Due to his performance at the youth team, Kharatishvili was nominated among the best U19 players of the 2021 season. At an awards ceremony organized by the Football Federation, he won the Aleksandre Chivadze bronze medal.

Kharatishvili received a first call-up to U21s for a friendly game against Romania in May 2022. With Giorgi Mamardashvili being the first-choice shot-stopper during the 2023 European Championship co-hosted by Georgia, Kharatishvili made his U21 debut in a 1–0 away win against Moldova on 12 September 2023. He featured in all remaining ten matches of the qualifying round, keeping five clean sheets, but he especially shone in the play-offs against Croatia with two penalty saves. Kharatishvili was widely hailed as his team made it through to the final stage of the competition.

Kharatishili played Georgia's all three matches in 2025 Euro Under-21. His personal share in a 2–1 win over Poland was significant with his last-gasp save described by the UEFA official webpage as jaw-dropping. The Georgian keeper was commended for his performance against France as well. Despite a narrow 3–2 defeat, he was named Player of the Match by Flashscore.

Overall, Kharatishvili participated in 29 games at the U19 and U21 levels.

== Career statistics ==
As of 31 May 2025

Appearances and goals by club, season and competition
Club	Season	League			National cup		Continental		Other		Total	
Club	Season	Division	Apps	Goals	Apps	Goals	Apps	Goals	Apps	Goals	Apps	Goals
Dinamo Batumi	2021	Erovnuli Liga	—		—		—		—		0	0
Dinamo Batumi	2023	Erovnuli Liga	3	0	—		—		—		3	0
Dinamo Batumi	2024	Erovnuli Liga	16	0	—		—		2 (Note: Appearances in Georgian Super Cup)	0	18	0
Dinamo Batumi	2025	Erovnuli Liga	15	0	0	0	—		—		15	0
Dinamo Batumi	Total		34	0	0	0	0	0	2	0	36	0
Shukura (loan)	2022	Erovnuli Liga 2	31	0	3	0	—		—		34	0
Samtredia (loan)	2023	Erovnuli Liga	12	0	—		—		2 (Note: Appearances in Erovnuli Liga playoffs)	0	14	0
Career total			77	0	3	0	0	0	4	0	84	0

== Honours ==
=== Club ===
Dinamo Batumi

- Erovnuli Liga: 2021

Shukura

- Erovnuli Liga 2: 2022
