= Tsotne Patsatsia =

Georgian footballer (born 2000)

Personal information
- Date of birth: 28 March 2000 (age 26)
- Place of birth: Tbilisi, Georgia
- Height: 1.85 m (6 ft 1 in)
- Position: Midfielder

Team information
- Current team: Meshakhte
- Number: 18

Senior career*
Years	Team	Apps	(Gls)
2017–2022	Merani Martvili	63	(4)
2019	→ Gagra (loan)	14	(3)
2023	Shukura	19	(7)
2023–2024	Dinamo Batumi	26	(3)
2024–2025	Torpedo Kutaisi	34	(5)
2025	Tirana	11	(2)
2025	→Tirana B	1	(0)
2026–	Meshakhte	12	(2)

International career
2018	Georgia U19	2	(0)
- * Club domestic league appearances and goals as of 10 July 2026

Tsotne Patsatsia (Georgian: ცოტნე ფაცაცია; born 28 March 2000) is a Georgian professional footballer who plays as a midfielder for Erovnuli Liga club Meshakhte.

Patsatsia has won the top Georgian league and received the Goal of the Year award.

== Career ==
Patsatsia started his professional career at Liga 2 club Merani Martvili where he spent five seasons. At age 17, he made a debut as a substitute in a 5–0 away win against Guria.

On 27 November 2018, Patsatsia scored his first goal in a 2–0 home win over Merani Tbilisi. Around the same time, he took part in two matches for Georgia U19s in 2019 European Championship qualifiers.

After the 2018 season, Patsatsia was loaned to Gagra. In early 2020, the player rejoined Merani who made an unsuccessful attempt to advance to the Erovnuli Liga via playoffs a year later.

In January 2023, Merani announced that their head coach and twelve players, including Patsatsia, would leave the club following a financial crisis. The player moved to Shukura Kobuleti and in his very first top-league game netted from the penalty spot against Dinamo Batumi. He bagged an equalizer in the second match as well against the same opponents, although in both cases Shukura failed to claim a point. Overall, he scored seven times for the bottom-placed team.

Patsatsia's performance on the pitch drew attention from Dinamo Batumi who signed him during the summer transfer window.

The last of the three goals that Patsatsia scored for his new club was a 57m wonder strike from his own half, which sealed not only a 3–0 victory over Telavi, but also champion's fate in favour of Dinamo Batumi. At the end of this season, Patsatsia was announced the winner of the Goal of the Year award.

Patsatsia spent half of the 2024 season at the club before joining Torpedo Kutaisi on a 3+1 year-long deal. The player made his first appearance for Torpedo in a UEFA Conference League match against Omonia, which also turned out his debut in a European competition.

In July 2025, Patsatsia moved to Albanian side FK Tirana on a two-year contract, although left the club after a half season.

In February 2026, he returned to the Georgian top league and signed for Meshakhte.

== Statistics ==
As of match played 10 May 2026

Appearances and goals by club, season and competition
Club	Season	League			National Cup		Continental		Other		Total	
Club	Season	Division	Apps	Goals	Apps	Goals	Apps	Goals	Apps	Goals	Apps	Goals
Merani Martvili	2017	Erovnuli Liga 2	2	0	–		–		–		2	0
Merani Martvili	2018	Erovnuli Liga 2	15	1	–		–		–		15	1
Merani Martvili	2020	Erovnuli Liga 2	4	0	–		–		2 (Note: Appearances in Liga 2 relegation play-offs)	1	6	1
Merani Martvili	2021	Erovnuli Liga 2	15	0	1	0	–		1 (Note: Appearance in Liga 2 promotion play-off)	0	17	0
Merani Martvili	2022	Erovnuli Liga 2	27	3	2	1	–		–		29	4
Merani Martvili	Total		63	4	3	1	0	0	3	1	69	6
Gagra	2019	Erovnuli Liga 2	14	3	–		–		–		14	3
Shukura	2023	Erovnuli Liga	19	7	–		–		–		19	7
Dinamo Batumi	2023	Erovnuli Liga	15	3	3	1	–		–		18	4
Dinamo Batumi	2024	Erovnuli Liga	11	0	0	0	0	0	0	0	11	0
Dinamo Batumi	Total		26	3	3	1	0	0	0	0	29	4
Torpedo Kutaisi	2024	Erovnuli Liga	16	3	1	0	2 (Note: Appearances in UEFA Conference League qualifiers)	0	–		19	3
Torpedo Kutaisi	2025	Erovnuli Liga	18	2	–		–		–		18	2
Torpedo Kutaisi	Total		34	5	1	0	2	0	0	0	37	5
FK Tirana	2025–26	Kategoria Superiore	11	2	–		–		–		11	2
Meshakhte	2026	Erovnuli Liga	12	2	–		–		–		12	2
Career total			179	26	7	2	2	0	3	1	191	29

== Honours ==
=== Team ===
Dinamo Batumi

- Erovnuli Liga winner: 2023

=== Individual ===
- Erovnuli Liga Goal of the Year award: 2023
