= Nodar Lominadze =

Georgian footballer (born 2002)

Personal information
- Date of birth: 4 April 2002 (age 24)
- Place of birth: Ozurgeti, Georgia
- Height: 1.94 m (6 ft 4 in)
- Position: Central midfielder

Team information
- Current team: Torpedo
- Number: 17

Youth career
- 2010–2018: Mertskhali
- 2019: Dinamo Tbilisi

Senior career*
Years	Team	Apps	(Gls)
2020–2025	Dinamo Tbilisi	41	(1)
2022	→ Gagra (loan)	14	(1)
2023	→ Samgurali (loan)	27	(7)
2024	→ Dila (loan)	16	(0)
2025–2026	Estoril	16	(2)
2026–	Torpedo	4	(0)

International career^{‡}
2019	Georgia U18	1	(1)
2019–2020	Georgia U19	3	(0)
2022–2025	Georgia U21	21	(4)
2025–	Georgia	2	(0)
- * Club domestic league appearances and goals as of 1 September 2026 ‡ National team caps and goals as of 6 October 2026

Nodar Lominadze (Georgian: ნოდარ ლომინაძე; born 4 April 2002) is a Georgian professional footballer who plays as a central midfielder for Torpedo and the Georgia national team.

He has won the Erovnuli Liga and Supercup and represented his country in the national youth teams.

== Career ==
=== Club ===
Lominadze started playing football at the age of 8 at Mertskhali. In 2018, he moved to Rustavi for a short time before joining the academy of Dinamo Tbilisi the next year. Initially, Lominadze played at Dinamo U19 and Dinamo-2.

Lominadze made his debut for the senior team as a half-time substitute in the final game of the 2021 season against Locomotive when he came off the bench to replace Barnes Osei. After taking part in nine league matches the next year, he was loaned to Gagra on a six-month deal in the summer. Lominadze opened his goal-scoring account in the Erovnuli Liga in a few days after this transfer. His new team was trailing 3–1 against Saburtalo when two late goals, including from Lominadze, helped them pick up a point on 29 June 2022. Eventually, Gagra finished in the play-off zone and retained their top-flight place after a penalty shoot-out against Spaeri, in which Lominadze also converted from the spot.

He spent the next season at Samgurali on loan, scoring seven times, two goals less than the team topscorer Giorgi Nikabadze.

Lominadze returned to Dinamo for 2024, but after a half-season moved to Dila again on a loan transfer.

In July 2025, Lominadze moved to Primeira Liga club Estoril. On 13 September, he scored his first goal for the team in a 3–1 home win over AFS. After making 16 league appearances for the club, Lominadze returned to Georgia to sign for Torpedo Kutaisi.

=== International ===
In 2019, Lominadze became a member of the U19 team and featured in a 2020 European Championship 2–0 win over Croatia. He received a first call-up to U21s for a friendly game against Estonia in March 2022, although made a debut in a 1–0 friendly win over Latvia a year later.

As the team was gearing up for its first European Championship in the summer of 2023, coach Ramaz Svanadze named Lominadze in his final 23-men squad. He played in all three matches of the group stage with Georgia claiming first place.

Lominadze made a significant contribution to U21's successful 2025 UEFA European Championship qualifying campaign by scoring in each of the last three matches. It included his long-distance deflected shot that helped his team come from behind in a 2–1 crucial win over North Macedonia and reach play-offs. In a return leg against Croatia on 19 November 2024, Lominadze equalized, and later scored with a panenka kick in penalty shootout, which sent Georgia to the final stages of the competition.

The player shone in the first game of the 2025 Euro Under-21 as well. Lominadze gave his team the lead in a 2–1 win against Poland and, in general, displayed performance that prompted some sport websites to name him Player of the Match.

Lomanadze received his first call-up to the national team for 2026 FIFA World Cup qualifiers in September 2025. He made an appearance for the team as a substitute in a 3–0 win over Bulgaria.

== Career statistics ==
As of match played 16 May 2026

Appearances and goals by club, season and competition
Club	Season	League			National cup (Note: Includes Georgian Cup, Taça de Portugal)		Continental		Other		Total	
Club	Season	Division	Apps	Goals	Apps	Goals	Apps	Goals	Apps	Goals	Apps	Goals
Dinamo Tbilisi	2021	Erovnuli Liga	1	0	0	0	0	0	0	0	1	0
Dinamo Tbilisi	2022	Erovnuli Liga	9	0	0	0	0	0	—		9	0
Dinamo Tbilisi	2024	Erovnuli Liga	13	0	0	0	2 (Note: Appearances in UEFA Europa Conference League)	0	2 (Note: Appearance in Georgian Super Cup)	1	17	1
Dinamo Tbilisi	2025	Erovnuli Liga	18	1	0	0	—		—		18	1
Dinamo Tbilisi	Total		41	1	0	0	2	0	2	1	45	2
Gagra (loan)	2022	Erovnuli Liga	14	1	1	0	—		2 (Note: Appearances in Erovnuli Liga playoffs)	0	17	1
Samgurali (loan)	2023	Erovnuli Liga	27	7	3	1	—		—		30	8
Dila (loan)	2024	Erovnuli Liga	16	0	0	0	0	0	—		16	0
Estoril	2025–26	Primeira Liga	16	2	1	0	—		—		17	2
Career total			114	11	5	1	2	0	4	1	125	13

=== International ===
As of match played 5 October 2026

Appearances and goals by national team and year
National team	Year	Apps	Goals
Georgia	2025	1	0
Georgia	2026	1	0
Total		2	0

== Honours ==
=== Club ===
Dinamo Tbilisi

- Erovnuli Liga: 2020
- Georgian Super Cup: 2021
