= Revaz Injgia =

Georgian footballer

Personal information
- Date of birth: 31 December 2000 (age 25)
- Place of birth: Tbilisi, Georgia
- Height: 1.87 m (6 ft 2 in)
- Position: Midfielder

Senior career*
| Years | Team | Apps | (Gls) |
| 2018–2020 | Locomotive Tbilisi | 32 | (3) |
| 2020 | Radnički Sremska Mitrovica | 0 | (0) |
| 2021 | Telavi | 13 | (1) |
| 2021–2022 | Apollon Limassol | 14 | (1) |
| 2022 | → Doxa Katokopias (loan) | 0 | (0) |
| 2023–2024 | Samtredia | 48 | (4) |
| 2024–2025 | Dinamo Batumi | 34 | (4) |
| 2025–2026 | Olympiakos Nicosia | 23 | (2) |
- * Club domestic league appearances and goals as of 14 June 2026

Revaz Injgia (Georgian: რევაზ ინჯგია, romanized: revaz injgia; born 31 December 2000) is a Georgian professional footballer who played as a midfielder for Cypriot First Division club Olympiakos Nicosia.

He has won the Cypriot First Division and the Supercup.

== Career ==
Injgia is a product of Locomotive's academy. In 2018, when its U19 team won the youth league, he became the topscorer with 28 goals and joined the senior team.

Injgia made his debut in the Erovnuli Liga on 13 May 2018 as a second-half substitute in a 1–0 win against Dinamo Tbilisi. He scored his first top-flight goal in a 2–1 win over Sioni on 25 November 2018. A three-year contract extending his stay at Locomotive was signed on 14 December 2018.

In 2021, after a half-season tenure at Telavi, Injgia moved to Cypriot First Division club Apollon. He scored a last-gasp winner in a Limassol derby against AEL on 10 February 2022. This season Apollon won the league and the Cypriot Super Cup with Injgia making 14 appearances for the team.

In 2023, the player returned to Georgia to join Samtredia. During the next eighteen months at this club, he took part in 48 matches.

In the 2024 summer break, Injgia signed for the reigning national champions Dinamo Batumi.

== Honour ==
Apollon Limassol

- Cypriot First Division: 2021–22
- Cypriot Super Cup: 2022
