= Ricardo Silva (footballer, born 1999) =

Portuguese footballer (born 1999)

Personal information
- Full name: Ricardo Manuel Rodrigues Vieira da Silva
- Date of birth: 9 May 1999 (age 27)
- Place of birth: Mafamude, Portugal
- Height: 1.89 m (6 ft 2 in)
- Position: Goalkeeper

Team information
- Current team: NK Celje
- Number: 41

Youth career
- 2007–2009: Candal
- 2009–2011: CB Estarreja
- 2011–2018: Porto
- 2014–2015: → Padroense (loan)

Senior career*
Years	Team	Apps	(Gls)
2018–2022	Porto B	76	(0)
2022	Santa Clara	0	(0)
2023	Moreirense	2	(0)
2023–2024	Tondela	28	(0)
2024	Dinamo Batumi	5	(0)
2025–	NK Celje	9	(0)

International career^{‡}
2018	Portugal U19	1	(0)
2018–2019	Portugal U20	3	(0)
- * Club domestic league appearances and goals as of 18 May 2025 ‡ National team caps and goals as of 21 July 2020

Ricardo Manuel Rodrigues Vieira da Silva (born 9 May 1999) is a Portuguese professional footballer who plays as a goalkeeper for Slovenian PrvaLiga club NK Celje.

== Club career ==
Born in Mafamude, Vila Nova de Gaia, Silva began his career at FC Porto. He made his LigaPro debut for FC Porto B on 19 April 2019 in a 2–1 loss at Sporting Covilhã. On 18 August, he was sent off in a 1–1 draw at home to Varzim.

On 29 June 2022, Silva signed a three-year contract with Primeira Liga club Santa Clara.

On 30 January 2023, Silva signed with Liga Portugal 2 side Moreirense until the end of the season.

On 4 July 2023, Silva signed a two-year contract with Liga Portugal 2 club Tondela.

On 7 July 2024, Georgian reigning champions Dinamo Batumi announced signing Silva.

He joined the reigning Slovenian PrvaLiga champions NK Celje in the winter transfer window in January 2025, signing a contract lasting until 30 June 2027. Despite not being a regular starter in the Slovenian League in the following period, he notably kept a clean sheet in the first leg and saved a penalty shot in penalty shootout against Lugano in the second leg of Round of 16 of the 2024-25 UEFA Conference League, contributing to Celje becoming the first Slovenian club to ever reach quarter-finals of any of the major UEFA club competitions.
