= Levan Kharabadze =

Georgian footballer (born 2000)

Personal information
- Date of birth: 26 January 2000 (age 26)
- Place of birth: Kutaisi, Georgia
- Height: 1.85 m (6 ft 1 in)
- Position: Left-back

Team information
- Current team: Dinamo Tbilisi
- Number: 27

Youth career
- 2011–2014: Torpedo Kutaisi
- 2014–2018: Dinamo Tbilisi

Senior career*
Years	Team	Apps	(Gls)
2018–2022	Dinamo Tbilisi	76	(6)
2019–2020	→ Zürich (loan)	24	(1)
2022–2023	Pafos	3	(0)
2023–2024	Dinamo Batumi	38	(3)
2025–2026	Torpedo	8	(0)
2026–	Dinamo Tbilisi	0	(0)

International career^{‡}
2015–2017	Georgia U17	24	(7)
2016–2018	Georgia U19	12	(0)
2019–	Georgia	2	(0)
- * Club domestic league appearances and goals as of 18 June 2026 ‡ National team caps and goals as of 10 June 2019

Levan Kharabadze (Georgian: ლევან ხარაბაძე; 26 January 2000) is a Georgian professional footballer who plays as a left-back for Dinamo Tbilisi.

He is the two-time winner of the Erovnuli Liga.

== Club career ==
Kharabadze started his football career in his hometown club Torpedo Kutaisi, before moving to Dinamo Tbilisi in 2014. He scored his first top-league goal in a 4–1 win over Kolkheti 1913 on 27 April 2018.

In January 2019, Kharabadze signed a year-and-a-half loan deal with Zürich.

In February he made his debut in Swiss Super League, playing the full 90 minutes in a 1–3 against FC St. Gallen.

In summer 2022 he moved to Pafos.

A year later Kharabadze returned to Georgia to join Dinamo Batumi. He was a member of the squad that won the league in 2023. Following the 2024 season, the player returned to his childhood club Torpedo on a three-year deal.

== International ==
Kharabadze made his debut for the Georgia national football team on 26 March 2019 in a Euro 2020 qualifier against Ireland, as a 65th-minute substitute for Davit Khocholava. Later in June he played the whole match in a 3–0 win over Gibraltar.

== Statistics ==
As of match played 28 April 2025

Appearances and goals by club, season and competition
Club	Season	League			National cup		Continental		Other		Total	
Club	Season	Division	Apps	Goals	Apps	Goals	Apps	Goals	Apps	Goals	Apps	Goals
Dinamo Tbilisi	2018	Erovnuli Liga	31	4	4	0	2 (Note: Appearances in UEFA Europa League qualifiers)	0	–		37	4
Dinamo Tbilisi	2021	Erovnuli Liga	28	2	1	0	4 (Note: Two appearances in UEFA Champions League qualifiers and two appearances in UEFA Europa Conference League qualifiers)	0	–		33	2
Dinamo Tbilisi	2022	Erovnuli Liga	17	0	–		2 (Note: Appearances in UEFA Champions League qualifiers)	1	–		19	1
Dinamo Tbilisi	Total		76	6	5	0	8	1	0	0	89	7
Zürich (loan)	2018–19	Swiss Super League	16	1	2	0	2	0	–		20	1
Zürich (loan)	2019–20	Swiss Super League	8	0	–		–		–		8	0
Zürich (loan)	Total		24	1	2	0	2	0	0	0	28	1
Pafos	2022–23	Cypriot First Division	3	0	–		–		–		3	0
Dinamo Batumi	2023	Erovnuli Liga	16	2	2	0	–		–		18	2
Dinamo Batumi	2024	Erovnuli Liga	22	1	1	0	4	0	2	0	29	1
Dinamo Batumi	Total		38	3	3	0	4	0	2	0	47	3
Torpedo	2025	Erovnuli Liga	8	0	–		–		–		8	0
Career total			149	10	10	0	14	1	2	0	175	11

== Honours ==
Dinamo Tbilisi

- Erovnuli Liga: 2020
- Super Cup: 2021

Dinamo Batumi

- Erovnuli Liga: 2023
