= Gabriel Ramos (footballer) =

Brazilian footballer (born 1996)

Personal information
- Full name: Gabriel Ramos da Penha
- Date of birth: 20 March 1996 (age 30)
- Place of birth: Campos dos Goytacazes, Brazil
- Height: 1.84 m (6 ft 0 in)
- Position: Winger

Youth career
- Goytacaz
- Americano
- 2011–2015: Bahia
- 2016–2017: Flamengo

Senior career*
Years	Team	Apps	(Gls)
2017	Flamengo	0	(0)
2017	→ Cuiabá (loan)	11	(2)
2018–2019	Dinamo Batumi	56	(9)
2020	Torpedo-BelAZ Zhodino	28	(11)
2021–2022	Riga	41	(11)
2021	→ Londrina (loan)	5	(0)
2023	Bucheon	20	(2)
2024	Dinamo Batumi	6	(0)
2024	Omonia 29M	13	(0)
2025	Cianorte	23	(2)
2026	São José-SP	10	(2)
- * Club domestic league appearances and goals as of 19:58, 16 June 2026 (UTC)

Gabriel Ramos da Penha (born 20 March 1996) is a Brazilian professional footballer who plays as a winger.

== Career ==
Born in Campos dos Goytacazes, Rio de Janeiro, Ramos played for hometown sides Goytacaz and Americano before joining the youth categories of Bahia. In December 2015, he moved to Flamengo as his contract was due to expire.

On 13 February 2017, Ramos was loaned to Cuiabá, and scored on his debut one month later, a 5–0 Campeonato Mato-Grossense away routing of Operário FC. He left both sides at the end of the season, and moved abroad on 13 June 2018, signing for Dinamo Batumi in Georgia.

After helping Dinamo to achieve promotion as champions, Ramos left the club on 26 January 2020, and subsequently joined Torpedo-BelAZ Zhodino in Belarus. On 20 January 2021, he switched teams and countries again, joining Latvian side Riga.

On 23 August 2021, Ramos returned to his home country after being loaned out to Londrina. Back at Riga for the 2022 season, he scored against Derry City at the Ryan McBride Brandywell Stadium in Derry for the UEFA Europa Conference League in the first qualifying round of the season 2022–23.

On 6 January 2023, after finishing the year with 12 goals for Riga, Ramos joined K League 2 side Bucheon. On 10 February 2024, he returned to Dinamo Batumi.

After leaving Dinamo in July 2024, Ramos agreed to a deal with Omonia 29M in Cyprus on 16 August. He terminated his link with the latter the following 5 January, and joined Cianorte back in his home country six days later.

On 19 November 2025, Ramos was announced at São José-SP.

== Career statistics ==
As of 16 June 2026

Club	Season	League			State league (Note: Includes Campeonato Mato-Grossense, Campeonato Paranaense, Campeonato Paulista Série A2)		Cup (Note: Includes Copa do Brasil, Georgian Cup, Latvian Football Cup, Korean FA Cup)		Continental		Other		Total	
Club	Season	Division	Apps	Goals	Apps	Goals	Apps	Goals	Apps	Goals	Apps	Goals	Apps	Goals
Cuiabá	2017	Série C	4	0	7	2	1	0	—		0	0	12	2
Dinamo Batumi	2018	Erovnuli Liga 2	21	5	—		—		—		—		21	5
Dinamo Batumi	2019	Erovnuli Liga	35	4	—		1	0	—		—		36	4
Dinamo Batumi	Total		56	9	—		1	0	—		—		57	9
Torpedo-BelAZ Zhodino	2020	Belarusian Premier League	28	11	—		2	1	—		—		30	12
Riga	2021	Virslīga	10	2	—		—		—		—		10	2
Riga	2022	Virslīga	31	9	—		—		6 (Note: Appearance(s) in UEFA Europa Conference League)	3	—		37	12
Riga	Total		41	11	—		—		6	3	—		47	14
Londrina (loan)	2021	Série B	5	0	—		—		—		—		5	0
Bucheon	2023	K League 2	20	2	—		1	0	—		—		21	2
Dinamo Batumi	2024	Erovnuli Liga	6	0	—		—		—		—		6	0
Omonia 29M	2024–25	Cypriot First Division	13	0	—		0	0	—		—		13	0
Cianorte	2025	Série D	13	0	10	2	—		—		—		23	2
São José-SP	2026	Paulista A2	—		10	2	—		—		—		10	2
Career Total			186	33	27	6	5	1	6	3	0	0	224	43

== Honours ==
Dinamo Batumi

- Erovnuli Liga 2: 2018
