= Nikoloz Mali =

Georgian footballer (born 1999)

Personal information
- Full name: Nikoloz Mali
- Date of birth: 27 January 1999 (age 27)
- Place of birth: Georgia
- Height: 1.74 m (5 ft 9 in)
- Position: Right-back

Team information
- Current team: Dila
- Number: 23

Youth career
- –2017: Saburtalo Tbilisi

Senior career*
Years	Team	Apps	(Gls)
2015–2022	Saburtalo Tbilisi	87	(5)
2022–2023	Dinamo Tbilisi	58	(0)
2024	Dinamo Batumi	35	(0)
2025	Bunyodkor	28	(0)
2025	Dila	9	(0)

International career^{‡}
2016–2017	Georgia U19	10	(0)
2019	Georgia U21	7	(0)
2020–	Georgia	4	(0)
- * Club domestic league appearances and goals as of 7 May 2026 ‡ National team caps and goals as of 16:02, 8 September 2020 (UTC)

Nikoloz Mali (Georgian: ნიკოლოზ მალი; born 27 January 1999) is a Georgian professional footballer who plays as a right-back for Erovnuli Liga club Dila.

He is the two-time Georgian champion and has played for the Georgia national team.

== Career ==
A product of Saburtalo academy, Mali spent seven seasons at this club. On 29 April 2017, he scored his first top-league goal in a 5–0 win over Shukura. Overall, between 2018 and 2021, he won all three domestic trophies at Saburtalo and once received an individual recognition by being named in Team of the Season.

In early February 2022, Mali signed a two-year contract with Dinamo Tbilisi. During this period he added another league and Super Cup titles to his tally.

Before the start of the 2024 season, Mali joined reigning champions Dinamo Batumi.

Mali made his international debut for Georgia on 8 September 2020 in the UEFA Nations League against North Macedonia.

== Career statistics ==
=== International ===
As of 8 September 2020

Georgia
Year	Apps	Goals
2020	1	0
Total	1	0

== Honours ==
=== Club ===
Erovnuli Liga (2)
2018, 2022

Georgian Cup (2)
2019, 2021

Super Cup (2)
2020, 2023

=== Individual ===
Team of the Season (1)
2019
