= Iva Gelashvili =

Georgian footballer (born 2001)

Personal information
- Date of birth: 8 April 2001 (age 25)
- Place of birth: Tbilisi, Georgia
- Height: 1.92 m (6 ft 4 in)
- Position: Centre-back

Team information
- Current team: CFR Cluj
- Number: 3

Youth career
- 2010–2011: ABC Braník
- 2011–2015: Bohemians 1905
- 2016–2020: Sparta Prague

Senior career*
| Years | Team | Apps | (Gls) |
| 2020–2022 | Sparta Prague B | 27 | (1) |
| 2022–2025 | Dinamo Batumi | 0 | (0) |
| 2022 | → Sioni (loan) | 8 | (0) |
| 2023 | → Saburtalo (loan) | 15 | (1) |
| 2023–2024 | → Spezia (loan) | 9 | (1) |
| 2024–2025 | Iberia 1999 | 29 | (2) |
| 2025–2026 | Panserraikos | 28 | (1) |
| 2026– | CFR Cluj | 6 | (0) |

International career^{‡}
| 2017 | Georgia U16 | 1 | (0) |
| 2016–2018 | Georgia U17 | 21 | (0) |
| 2018 | Georgia U18 | 1 | (0) |
| 2018–2020 | Georgia U19 | 12 | (1) |
| 2020–2023 | Georgia U21 | 14 | (0) |
| 2023– | Georgia | 5 | (0) |
- * Club domestic league appearances and goals as of 31 October 2026 ‡ National team caps and goals as of 5 June 2026

Iva Gelashvili (Georgian: ივა გელაშვილი; born 8 April 2001) is a Georgian professional footballer who plays as a centre-back for Liga I club CFR Cluj and the Georgia national team.

== Career ==
Gelashvili started his career with Czech side Sparta Prague B, where he was regarded as a prospect.

In the summer of 2022, Gelashvili signed with Dinamo Batumi, although moved to Sioni on a loan deal. He started the next season at Saburtalo and opened his top-league goal account in a 3–3 draw against Samtredia.

Gelashvili took part in all four matches for Georgia U21s in the 2023 UEFA European Championship co-hosted by his country. Shortly he received a call-up to the senior national team and made his first appearance in a 8–0 win over Thailand as a starter.

On 23 August 2023, Serie B club Spezia announced the signing a year-long loan contract with Gelashvili. His injury-time header against Modena salvaged Spezia a point on 26 December 2023.

As his loan deal came expired, Gelashvili returned to Georgia the next summer and rejoined Iberia 1999.

== Career statistics ==
=== Club ===
As of match played 31 October 2026

Appearances and goals by club, season and competition
| Club | Season | League | | | National cup (Note: Includes Coppa Italia, Cupa României) | | Europe | | Other | | Total | |
| Club | Season | Division | Apps | Goals | Apps | Goals | Apps | Goals | Apps | Goals | Apps | Goals |
|---|---|---|---|---|---|---|---|---|---|---|---|---|
| Sparta Prague B | 2020–21 | ČFL | 7 | 0 | — | | — | | — | | 7 | 0 |
| Sparta Prague B | 2021–22 | Czech National Football League | 20 | 1 | — | | — | | — | | 20 | 1 |
| Sparta Prague B | Total | | 27 | 1 | — | | — | | — | | 27 | 1 |
| Dinamo Batumi | 2022 | Erovnuli Liga | 0 | 0 | — | | 0 | 0 | — | | 0 | 0 |
| Dinamo Batumi | 2023 | Erovnuli Liga | 0 | 0 | 0 | 0 | 0 | 0 | 0 | 0 | 0 | 0 |
| Dinamo Batumi | 2024 | Erovnuli Liga | 0 | 0 | 0 | 0 | 0 | 0 | 0 | 0 | 0 | 0 |
| Dinamo Batumi | Total | | 0 | 0 | 0 | 0 | 0 | 0 | 0 | 0 | 0 | 0 |
| Sioni (loan) | 2022 | Erovnuli Liga | 8 | 0 | 0 | 0 | — | | 2 (Note: Appearances in Erovnuli Liga promotion/relegation play-offs) | 0 | 7 | 0 |
| Saburtalo (loan) | 2023 | Erovnuli Liga | 15 | 1 | — | | — | | — | | 15 | 1 |
| Spezia (loan) | 2023–24 | Serie B | 9 | 1 | 1 | 0 | — | | — | | 10 | 1 |
| Iberia 1999 | 2024 | Erovnuli Liga | 11 | 0 | — | | — | | — | | 11 | 0 |
| Iberia 1999 | 2025 | Erovnuli Liga | 18 | 2 | — | | 1 (Note: Appearance in UEFA Champions League) | 0 | 1 (Note: Appearance in Georgian Super Cup) | 0 | 20 | 2 |
| Iberia 1999 | Total | | 29 | 2 | — | | 1 | 0 | 1 | 0 | 31 | 2 |
| Panserraikos | 2025–26 | Super League Greece | 28 | 1 | 0 | 0 | — | | — | | 28 | 1 |
| CFR Cluj | 2026–27 | Liga I | 6 | 0 | 1 | 0 | — | | — | | 7 | 0 |
| Career total | | | 122 | 6 | 2 | 0 | 1 | 0 | 3 | 0 | 128 | 6 |

=== International ===
As of match played 5 June 2026

Appearances and goals by national team and year
| National team | Year | Apps | Goals |
|---|---|---|---|
| Georgia | 2023 | 1 | 0 |
| Georgia | 2024 | 0 | 0 |
| Georgia | 2025 | 1 | 0 |
| Georgia | 2026 | 3 | 0 |
| Total | | 5 | 0 |

== Personal life ==
Gelashvili attended university in the Czech Republic.

Gelashvili is the younger brother of Georgian skier Jaba Gelashvili.

== Honours ==
Iberia 1999

- Erovnuli Liga: 2024
