= David Mujiri (footballer, born 1999) =

Georgian footballer

Personal information
- Date of birth: 28 January 1999 (age 27)
- Place of birth: Samtredia, Georgia
- Height: 1.87 m (6 ft 2 in)
- Position: Forward

Team information
- Current team: Gagra
- Number: 9

Youth career
- –2016: 35th Football School Tbilisi
- 2016: Saburtalo Tbilisi
- 2017–2018: Antalyaspor

Senior career*
Years	Team	Apps	(Gls)
2014–2016	35th Football School Tbilisi	2	(0)
2018	Sheriff-2 Tiraspol	?	(?)
2019	WIT Georgia	11	(0)
2020	Dinamo Tbilisi	0	(0)
2020	→ Chikhura (loan)	13	(1)
2021	Shukura	5	(1)
2021	ViOn Zlaté Moravce	2	(0)
2022–2023	Telavi	30	(1)
2023	Shukura	28	(9)
2024	Dinamo Batumi	30	(4)
2025	Samgurali	18	(2)
2025	Gagra	30	(0)
- * Club domestic league appearances and goals as of 10 July 2026

David Mujiri (Georgian: დავით მუჯირი; born 28 January 1999) is a Georgian professional footballer who plays as a forward for Georgian club Gagra.

== Career ==
Mujiri started his career with Georgian third division side 35th School. In 2017, he joined the youth academy of Alanyaspor in the Turkish top flight. After that, Mujiri joined the youth academy of Moldovan club Sheriff. Before the 2019 season, he signed for WIT Georgia in Georgia. Before the 2020 season, he was sent on loan to Georgian outfit Chikhura from Dinamo Tbilisi, the most successful team in Georgia.

In 2021, Mujiri signed for Slovak side Zlaté Moravce. On 6 August 2021, he debuted for Zlaté Moravce during a 1–1 draw with Senica.

In January 2024, Mujiri joined Erovnuli Liga champions Dinamo Batumi.

A year later he moved to Samgurali. After taking part in all 18 games for the team by mid-season, Mujiri signed for fellow Erovnuli Liga side Gagra.

== Personal life ==
Mujiri grew up in the family of footballers. He is the son of Georgia international David Mujiri and grandson of Муджирі Давид Аміранович, who was a member of Dinamo Tbilisi in the late 1970s and early 1980s.
