= Football records and statistics in Georgia =

This page details football records and statistics in Georgia's all three competitions since early 1990 when the Georgian Football Federation was founded and relations with the Soviet Football were severed.

== Umaglesi / Erovnuli Liga ==
=== Team records ===
==== Titles ====
League title won by club (%)
1. Dinamo Tbilisi – 19 (51.4%)
2. Torpedo – 4 (10.8%)
3. Iberia 1999 - 3 (8.10%)
4. Dinamo Batumi – 2 (5.40%)
5. Zestaponi – 2 (5.40%)
6. Olimpi - 2 (5.40%)
7. WIT Georgia – 2 (5.40%)
8. Sioni - 1 (2.70%)
9. Samtredia - 1 (2.70%)
10. Dila - 1 (2.70%)
- Most league titles: 19, Dinamo Tbilisi
- Most consecutive league titles: 10, Dinamo Tbilisi (1990–1998/99)
- Biggest title-winning margin:
  - 17 points, Dinamo Tbilisi (81 points) over Kolkheti 1913 (64 points) in 1996–97
- Smallest title-winning margin:
  - 0 points, Zestaponi and Metalurgi both finished on 55 points in 2011–12, but Zestaponi won the title with more wins.

==== Wins ====
- Most wins in a season:
  - 30 games: 26, Dinamo Tbilisi (1996–97)
  - 26 games: 23, Dinamo Tbilisi (2007–08)
- Fewest wins in a season:
  - 34 games: 0, Liakhvi (1990)*
  - 26 games: 0, Kakheti (2006–07)

Note: Withdrew after round 24, awarded 3–0 loss for each remaining game.

==== Losses ====
- Most losses in a season:
  - 34 games: 34, Liakhvi (1990)
  - 26 games: 24, Kakheti (2006–07)
- Fewest losses in a season:
  - 19 games: 0, Dinamo Tbilisi (1991–92)
  - 26 games: 1, Olimpi (2006–07)

==== Points ====
- Most points in a season:
  - 26 games: 70, Dinamo Tbilisi (2007–08)
  - 38 games: 94, Dinamo Tbilisi (1993–94)
- Fewest points in a season:
  - 34 games: 0, Liakhvi (1990)

==== Goals scored ====
- Most goals scored in a season:
  - 38 games: 130, Dinamo Tbilisi (1994–95)
- Fewest goals scored in a season:
  - 34 games: 11, Liakhvi (1990)

==== Goals conceded ====
- Most goals conceded in a season:
  - 34 games: 135, Liakhvi (1990)

==== Appearances ====
- Most top-flight appearances overall:
  - **37**, Dinamo Tbilisi (all seasons since the formation of league in 1990)
- Fewest top-flight appearances overall: 1, joint record:
  - Egrisi (1995–96)
  - Milani (2002–03)
  - Spartaki Tbilisi (2005–06)

==== Scorelines ====
- Biggest home win: 12:0, Dinamo Tbilisi v. Borjomi (23 May 2009)
- Biggest away win: 0:9, Shukura v. Samtredia (24 November 2023), Shukura v. Gagra (2 December 2023)

==== All-time table ====
The table is a cumulative record of all match results, points and goals of every team that has played in the Umaglesi Liga since its inception in 1990. Accurate as of the end of the 2025 season, the statistics include relegation playoff matches.

Teams in bold take part in the 2026 Erovnuli Liga. Numbers in bold are the record (highest) numbers in each column. Teams in italics are defunct.

The table is sorted by all-time points.

Pos.	Club	Titles	Pld	W	D	L	GF	GA	Pts	PPG
**1**	**Dinamo Tbilisi**^{1}	**19**	**1168**	**769**	216	183	**2681**	942	**2523**	**2.16**
2	**Torpedo^{2}**	4	1071	528	**233**	310	1757	1214	1817	1.69
3	**Dinamo Batumi**^{3}	2	973	437	218	361	1479	1080	1529	1.57
4	**Dila**	1	1035	399	201	**435**	1332	**1417**	1398	1.35
5	Kolkheti 1913	0	847	322	177	348	1115	1158	1143	1.34
6	Metalurgi Rustavi^{4}	2	718	328	138	252	1062	867	1122	1.56
7	Sioni	1	787	271	174	342	895	1111	987	1.25
8	WIT Georgia	2	604	265	150	189	778	594	945	1.56
9	Locomotive	0	641	253	145	243	810	783	904	1.41
10	Samtredia^{5}	1	688	237	132	319	915	1108	843	1.22
11	Zugdidi^{6}	0	636	211	105	320	783	1057	738	1.16
12	**Samgurali**	0	515	179	105	231	648	830	642	1.24
13	Zestaponi	2	349	188	72	89	562	328	636	1.82
14	**Iberia 1999**^{7}	3	350	175	80	95	579	410	605	1.72
15	Guria	0	457	160	71	226	590	793	551	1.20
16	Chikhura	0	308	134	63	111	434	403	465	1.51
17	Merani Tbilisi^{8}	0	282	98	70	114	307	363	364	1.29
18	Tskhinvali^{9}	0	435	94	70	171	349	552	352	0.80
19	Margveti	0	247	98	43	106	397	443	337	1.36
20	Shevardeni 1906	0	236	90	42	104	355	383	312	1.32
21	**Gagra**	0	259	65	56	138	261	408	251	0.96
22	Telavi	0	206	55	65	86	200	273	230	1.11
23	Iveria	0	214	62	31	121	237	419	217	1.01
24	Kakheti	0	214	62	27	125	269	473	213	0.99
25	Tskhumi	0	153	59	22	72	265	269	199	1.30
26	Shukura	0	215	49	52	114	225	393	199	0.92
27	Alazani	0	125	55	20	50	197	224	185	1.48
28	Tbilisi	0	126	50	24	52	179	173	174	1.38
29	TSU	0	135	43	28	64	152	186	157	1.16
30	Merani Martvili	0	164	42	31	91	156	272	157	0.95
31	Ameri	0	82	47	13	22	133	67	154	1.87
32	Borjomi	0	112	38	19	55	132	185	133	1.18
33	Kolkheti Khobi^{10}	0	119	33	25	61	154	208	124	1.04
34	Mziuri	0	91	33	16	42	125	162	115	1.26
35	Sapovnela	0	95	30	17	48	122	185	107	1.12
36	Amirani	0	91	27	21	43	111	148	102	1.12
37	Mretebi	0	107	27	15	65	117	212	96	0.89
38	Mertskhali	0	137	24	23	90	125	281	96	0.7
39	**Rustavi**	0	76	17	25	34	76	106	76	1.0
40	Meskheti	0	56	18	14	24	52	72	68	1.21
41	Sulori	0	57	19	10	28	82	123	67	1.17
42	Chiatura	0	66	18	11	37	81	145	65	0.98
43	Arsenali	0	58	14	14	30	55	94	56	0.96
44	Metalurgi Zestaponi	0	64	15	11	38	50	123	56	0.87
45	Mtskheta	0	34	13	5	16	42	63	44	1.29
46	Gareji	0	38	8	13	17	43	57	37	0.97
47	Duruji	0	60	9	4	47	51	192	31	0.51
48	Milani	0	33	6	8	19	18	55	26	0.78
49	Egrisi	0	30	5	2	23	42	90	17	0.56
50	Spartaki	0	30	3	6	21	12	57	15	0.50
51	**Meshakhte**	0	0	0	0	0	0	0	0	0.0
52	**Spaeri**	0	0	0	0	0	0	0	0	0.0

Notes

- Note 1: Iberia (1990–92)
- Note 2: Kutaisi (1990–92)
- Note 3: Batumi (1990–93)
- Note 4: Initially Gorda, later Olimpi until 2012
- Note 5: Locomotive, Sanavardo, Juba and Iberia until 2006
- Note 6: Mglebi and Baia before 2012
- Note 7: Saburtalo until 2023
- Note 8: Includes Merani-91 and Merani-Olimpi
- Note 9: Includes Liakhvi Tskhinvali (1990) and Spartaki Tskhinvali
- Note 10: Khobi (1999–2000)

=== Individual Records ===
Champion with clubs:

- 7, Givi Didava (Dinamo Tbilisi and Torpedo)

Most goals in a game:

- 7, joint record: Gia Jishkariani for Tskhumi against Mertskhali (11–0, 22 November 1991), Zurab Museliani for Gagra against Shukura (9–0, 2 December 2023)

Most expensive outgoing transfer fee paid:

- €13,300,000, Khvicha Kvaratskhelia in 2022, from Dinamo Batumi to Napoli

==== All-time Umaglesi/Erovnuli Liga goalscorers ====
Rank	Player	Goals	Apps	Ratio
1	Zurab Ionanidze	**216**	422	0.51
2	Levan Khomeriki	**140**	230	0.61
3	**Irakli Sikharulidze**	**130**	387	0.34
4	Jaba Dvali	**127**	256	0.50
5	Giorgi Megreladze	**126**	256	0.49
Player **in bold** is still playing in Erovnuli Liga; Data as of 8 December 2025

==== All-time Umaglesi/Erovnuli liga foreign goalscorers ====
Rank	Player	Goals	Apps	Ratio
1	(Spain) Xisco Muñoz	**62**	98	0.63
2	(Brazil) Flamarion	**59**	119	0.50
3	(Ukraine) Mykola Kovtalyuk	**54**	107	0.50
4	(Serbia) Zoran Marušić	**33**	69	0.48
5	(Brazil) Anderson Aquino	**26**	33	0.79

==== All-time Umaglesi/Erovnuli Liga appearance leaders ====
**Rank**	**Player**	**Games**
1	Luka Razmadze	453
2	Aleksandre Koshkadze	444
3	Givi Didava	441
4	Zurab Ionanidze	422
5	Sevasti Todua	419

== Georgian Cup ==
Cup title won by club (%)
1. Dinamo Tbilisi – 13 (36.1%)
2. Torpedo – 5 (13.9%)
3. Iberia 1999 - 3 (8.33%)
4. Locomotive - 3 (8.33%)
5. Gagra - 2 (5.55%)
6. Ameri - 2 (5.55%)
7. Dila - 2 (5.55%)
8. Zestaponi – 1 (2.77%)
9. WIT Georgia – 1 (2.77%)
10. Dinamo Batumi – 1 (2.77%)
11. Guria - 1 (2.77%)
12. Spaeri - 1 (2.77%)
13. Chikhura - 1 (2.77%)

As of the end of 2025

=== Team records ===
Most wins: 13, Dinamo Tbilisi (1991–92, 1992–93, 1993–94, 1994–95, 1995–96, 1996–97, 2002–03, 2003–04, 2008–09, 2012–13, 2013–14, 2014–15, 2015–16)

Most consecutive wins: 6, Dinamo Tbilisi (1991–97)

Most appearances in finals: 16, Dinamo Tbilisi (1991–92, 1992–93, 1993–94, 1994–95, 1995–96, 1996–97, 1997–98, 2002–03, 2003–04, 2008–09, 2009–10, 2012–13, 2013–14, 2014–15, 2015–16, 2024)

Longest consecutive appearances in finals: 7, Dinamo Tbilisi (1991–1998)

Most defeats in finals: 5, shared record: Dinamo Batumi (1992–93, 1994–95, 1995–96, 1996–97, 2023); Torpedo Kutaisi: (1990–2000, 2001–02, 2003–04, 2010–11, 2017)

Most cup final appearances without winning: 3, Samgurali (1998–99, 2020, 2021

Biggest win: 5 goals, Dinamo Tbilisi 5–0 Samtredia (2014–15)

Most goals in a final: 6, Dinamo Tbilisi 4–2 Dinamo Batumi (1992–93)

=== Individual records ===
Most titles won by a coach:

- 4, David Kipiani

Most titles won by a player:

- 7, Irakli Zoidze

Most appearances in a final:

- 10, Grigol Dolidze

Most defeats in a final:

- 6, Sevasti Todua

Most goals in a final:

- 3, Suliko Davitashvili

== Super Cup ==
Supercup title won by club (%)
1. Dinamo Tbilisi – 9 (37.5%)
2. Torpedo – 3 (12.5%)
3. Dinamo Batumi – 2 (8.33%)
4. Zestaponi – 2 (8.33%)
5. Ameri - 2 (8.33%)
6. WIT Georgia – 1 (4.16%)
7. Iberia 1999 - 1 (4.16%)
8. Chikhura - 1 (4.16%)
9. Metalurgi - 1 (4.16%)
10. Samtredia - 1 (4.16%)
11. Dila - 1 (4.16%)

As of the end of 2025

=== Team records ===
Most wins: 9, Dinamo Tbilisi (1996, 1997, 1999, 2005, 2008, 2014, 2015, 2021, 2023)

Most consecutive wins: 2, shared record, Dinamo Tbilisi (1996–97), Ameri (2005–06), Zestaponi (2011–12), Torpedo (2018–19)

Most appearances in finals: 14, Dinamo Tbilisi (1996, 1997, 1998, 1999, 2005, 2008, 2009, 2013, 2014, 2015, 2020, 2021, 2023, 2024)

Longest consecutive appearances in finals: 5, Dinamo Tbilisi (1996, 1997, 1998, 1999, 2005)

Most defeats in finals: 5, Dinamo Tbilisi (1998, 2009, 2013, 2020, 2024)

Biggest win: 4 goals, Dinamo Tbilisi 4–0 Dinamo Batumi (2014–15)

Most goals in a final: 5, Dinamo Tbilisi 4–1 Dinamo Batumi (1996), Ameri 4–1 Olimpi (2007)

=== Individual records ===
Most titles won by a coach:

- 2, shared record: Kakha Chkhetiani, Gia Geguchadze, Gia Chiabrishvili, Giorgi Chikhradze

Most titles won by a player: 5, Givi Didava

Most appearances in finals: 7, Roin Kvaskhvadze

Most goals in finals: 4, Grigol Dolidze

Hat-trick in finals: 1, Grigol Dolidze (v Olimpi 4–1, 2007)
