= Georgian Super Cup =

- Founded: 1996
- Region: Georgia
- Teams: 4
- Current champions: FC Torpedo Kutaisi (4th title)
- Most championships: FC Dinamo Tbilisi (9 titles)

The Georgian Super Cup is a super cup tournament in Georgian football. Founded in 1996 as a two-team competition, the current version has been contested since 2023 by four teams, those being the first, second, and third placed teams in the Erovnuli Liga, as well as the winners of the Georgian Cup.

Formerly, the tournament used to be a single football match solely played between the champions of the Erovnuli Liga and the winners of the Georgian Cup. When a club had won both competitions, the Georgian Cup losing finalists play for the Super Cup. This occurred in 1996, 1997, 2013 and 2014 when Dinamo Tbilisi won the double on all four occasions.

In 2023, the format of Super Cup changed to be contested between four teams. The three teams that qualified for the Champions League and Europa Conference League from the Erovnuli Liga and the winners of the Georgian Cup play one-legged semi-finals, and a final. The losers of each semi-final play a third place play-off.

== Two Team Format (1996–2022) ==
Season	Winner	Score	Runner-up	Venue
1996; 27.07.1996	FC Dinamo Tbilisi (1); Winner of 1995–96 Umaglesi Liga and 1995–96 Georgian Cup	4–0	FC Dinamo Batumi; Runner-up of 1995–96 Georgian Cup	Tsentral Stadium, Batumi
1997; 03.08.1997	FC Dinamo Tbilisi (2); Winner of 1996–97 Umaglesi Liga and 1996–97 Georgian Cup	4−1	FC Dinamo Batumi; Runner-up of 1996–97 Georgian Cup	Givi Kiladze Stadium, Kutaisi
1998; 01.08.1998	FC Dinamo Batumi (1); Winner of 1997–98 Georgian Cup	2−1	FC Dinamo Tbilisi; Winner of 1997–98 Umaglesi Liga	Tsentral Stadium, Batumi
1999; 28.02.2000	FC Dinamo Tbilisi (3); Winner of 1998–99 Umaglesi Liga	1−0	FC Torpedo Kutaisi; Winner of 1998–99 Georgian Cup	Boris Paichadze Stadium, Tbilisi
2000–2004	Not held			
2005; 13.09.2005	FC Dinamo Tbilisi (4); Winner of 2004–05 Umaglesi Liga	1–0	FC Lokomotivi Tbilisi; Winner of 2004-05 Georgian Cup	Tsentral Stadium, Batumi
2006; 30.11.2006	FC Ameri Tbilisi (1); Winner of 2005-06 Georgian Cup	1–0	FC Sioni Bolnisi; Winner of 2005–06 Umaglesi Liga	Mikheil Meskhi Stadium, Tbilisi
2007; 08.12.2007	FC Ameri Tbilisi (2); Winner of 2006-07 Georgian Cup	4–1	FC Metalurgi Rustavi; Winner of 2006–07 Umaglesi Liga	Tengiz Burjanadze Stadium, Gori
2008; 02.12.2008	FC Dinamo Tbilisi (5); Winner of 2007–08 Umaglesi Liga	1–0	FC Zestaponi; Winner of 2007–08 Georgian Cup	Mikheil Meskhi Stadium, Tbilisi
2009; 16.12.2009	FC WIT Georgia (1); Winner of 2008–09 Umaglesi Liga	2–1 a.e.t.	FC Dinamo Tbilisi; Winner of 2008–09 Georgian Cup	Poladi Stadium, Rustavi
2010; 21.12.2010	FC Metalurgi Rustavi (1); Winner of 2009–10 Umaglesi Liga	2–0	FC WIT Georgia; Winner of 2009–10 Georgian Cup	Boris Paichadze Stadium, Tbilisi
2011; 29.05.2012	FC Zestaponi (1); Winner of 2010–11 Umaglesi Liga	3−1	FC Gagra; Winner of 2010–11 Georgian Cup	Mikheil Meskhi Stadium, Tbilisi
2012; 22.02.2013	FC Zestaponi (2); Winner of 2011–12 Umaglesi Liga	2–2 a.e.t. (4–2 pen.)	FC Dila Gori; Winner of 2011–12 Georgian Cup	Mikheil Meskhi Stadium, Tbilisi
2013; 22.12.2013	FC Chikhura Sachkhere (1); Runner-up of 2012–13 Georgian Cup	1−0	FC Dinamo Tbilisi; Winner of 2012–13 Umaglesi Liga and 2012–13 Georgian Cup	Mikheil Meskhi Stadium, Tbilisi
2014; 11.12.2014	FC Dinamo Tbilisi (6); Winner of 2013–14 Umaglesi Liga and 2013–14 Georgian Cup	1−0	FC Chikhura Sachkhere; Runner-up of 2013–14 Georgian Cup	Boris Paichadze Dinamo Arena, Tbilisi
2015; 25.08.2015	FC Dinamo Tbilisi (7); Winner of 2014–15 Georgian Cup	1−0	FC Dila Gori; Winner of 2014–15 Umaglesi Liga	Mikheil Meskhi Stadium, Tbilisi
2016	Not held			
2017; 26.02.2017	FC Samtredia (1); Winner of 2016 Umaglesi Liga	2−1	FC Torpedo Kutaisi; Winner of 2016 Georgian Cup	Murtaz Khurtsilava Stadium, Martvili
2018; 24.02.2018	FC Torpedo Kutaisi (1); Winner of 2017 Erovnuli Liga	2–1	FC Chikhura Sachkhere; Winner of 2017 Georgian Cup	David Petriashvili Stadium, Tbilisi
2019 24.02.2019	FC Torpedo Kutaisi (2); Winner of 2018 Georgian Cup	1–0	FC Saburtalo Tbilisi; Winner of 2018 Erovnuli Liga	Tengiz Burjanadze Stadium, Gori
2020 23.02.2020	FC Saburtalo Tbilisi (1); Winner of 2019 Georgian Cup	1 0	FC Dinamo Tbilisi; Winner of 2019 Erovnuli Liga	Mikheil Meskhi 2 Stadium, Tbilisi
2021 21.02.2021	FC Dinamo Tbilisi (8); Winner of 2020 Erovnuli Liga	2–2 (5–4 pen.)	FC Gagra; Winner of 2020 Georgian Cup	Mikheil Meskhi Stadium, Tbilisi
2022 20.02.2022	FC Dinamo Batumi (2); Winner of 2021 Erovnuli Liga	0–0 (7–6 pen.)	FC Saburtalo Tbilisi; Winner of 2021 Georgian Cup	Ramaz Shengelia Stadium, Kutaisi

== Four Team Format (2023–) ==
Season	Winners	Score	Runners-up	Final Venue	Third place	Score	Fourth place	Third place Match Venue
2023	FC Dinamo Tbilisi (9); Winner of 2022 Erovnuli Liga	1–1 (4–3 pen.)	FC Dinamo Batumi; Runners-up of 2022 Erovnuli Liga	Boris Paichadze Dinamo Arena, Tbilisi	FC Torpedo Kutaisi; Winner of 2022 Georgian Cup	0–0 (5–4 pen.)	FC Dila Gori; Third Place in 2022 Erovnuli Liga	Ramaz Shengelia Stadium, Kutaisi
2024	FC Torpedo Kutaisi (3); Third Place in 2023 Erovnuli Liga	2–1	FC Dinamo Tbilisi; Runners-up of 2023 Erovnuli Liga	Boris Paichadze Dinamo Arena, Tbilisi	FC Dinamo Batumi; Winner of 2023 Erovnuli Liga	3–2	FC Iberia 1999; Winner of 2023 Georgian Cup	Adjarabet Arena, Batumi
2025	FC Dila Gori (1); Third Place in 2024 Erovnuli Liga	2–0	FC Spaeri; Winner of 2024 Georgian Cup	David Petriashvili Stadium, Tbilisi	FC Torpedo Kutaisi; Runners-up of 2024 Erovnuli Liga	0–0 (3–2 pen.)	FC Iberia 1999; Winner of 2024 Erovnuli Liga	David Petriashvili Stadium, Tbilisi
2026	FC Torpedo Kutaisi (4); Third Place in 2025 Erovnuli Liga	2–2 (6–5 pen.)	FC Iberia 1999; Winner of 2025 Erovnuli Liga	Mikheil Meskhi Stadium, Tbilisi	FC Dinamo Tbilisi; Fourth Place in 2025 Erovnuli Liga	0–0 (4–2 pen.)	FC Dila Gori; Runners-up of 2025 Erovnuli Liga; Winner of 2025 Georgian Cup	Tengiz Burjanadze Stadium, Gori

== Performance by club ==
Club	Winners	Runners-up	Third	Fourth	Winning years	Runner-up years	Third place Years	Fourth place Years
Dinamo Tbilisi	9	5	1	0	1996, 1997, 1999, 2005, 2008, 2014, 2015, 2021, 2023	1998, 2009, 2013, 2020, 2024	2026	–
Torpedo Kutaisi	4	2	2	0	2018, 2019, 2024, 2026	1999, 2017	2023, 2025	–
Dinamo Batumi	2	3	1	0	1998, 2022	1996, 1997, 2023	2024	–
FC Zestaponi	2	1	0	0	2011, 2012	2008	–	–
Ameri Tbilisi	2	0	0	0	2006, 2007	–	–	–
FC Iberia 1999	1	3	0	2	2020	2019, 2022, 2026	–	2024, 2025
Dila Gori	1	2	0	2	2025	2012, 2015	–	2023, 2026
Chikhura Sachkhere	1	2	0	0	2013	2014, 2018	–	–
WIT Georgia	1	1	0	0	2009	2010	–	–
Metalurgi Rustavi	1	1	0	0	2010	2007	–	–
FC Samtredia	1	0	0	0	2017	–	–	–
FC Gagra	0	2	0	0	–	2011, 2021	–	–
Lokomotivi Tbilisi	0	1	0	0	–	2005	–	–
Sioni Bolsini	0	1	0	0	–	2006	–	–
FC Spaeri	0	1	0	0	–	2025	–	–

Clubs in italics are defunct.
