= List of FC Guria seasons =

Football Club Guria are a Georgian professional club based in Lanchkhuti, Guria. This list details the club's achievements in senior league and cup competitions both in the Soviet Union and Georgia, from their first official season in the Soviet 3rd tier in 1967 up to the present day. The table is correct up to the 2025 season.

== Key ==
Key to divisions

- Class B = Soviet Class B
- 2L = Soviet Second League
- 1L = Soviet First League
- TL = Soviet Top League
- GSL = Georgian Soviet League
- UL = Umaglesi Liga
- PL = Pirveli Liga
- ML = Meore Liga
- L2 = Erovnuli Liga 2
- L3 = Liga 3
- L4 = Liga 4

Key to positions and symbols

- 1st/W = Winners
- 2nd/RU = Runners-up
- ↑ = Promoted
- ↓ = Relegated

Key to rounds

- GS = Group stage
- LP = League phase
- PR = Preliminary round
- R1 = First round, etc.
- QF = Quarter-finals
- SF = Semi-finals
- RU = Runners-up
- W = Winners
- DNE = Did not enter

== Seasons ==
List of seasons, including league division and statistics and cup results
Season	League									Cup
Season	Division	Pld	W	D	L	GF	GA	Pts	Pos	Cup
1967	Class B	38	14	8	16	44	44	36	12th of 20	QR G4
1968	Class B	40	23	6	11	72	38	52	2nd of 21	
1969	Class B	38	21	7	10	56	32	49	2nd of 20	
1970	Class B	34	15	11	8	53	28	41	5th of 18 (Note: Demoted for disciplinary issues)	
1971	GSL								1st↑	
1972	2L	36	12	7	17	46	49	31	13th of 19	
1973	2L	34	13	5	16	52	52	31	8th of 18	
1974	2L	38	10	17	11	56	53	37	11th of 20	DNE
1975	2L	34	18	5	11	62	47	41	3rd of 18	DNE
1976	2L	38	21	10	7	67	34	52	1st of 20 (Note: Lost promotion play-offs to Uralmash 2–0 on aggregate)	
1977	2L	42	22	7	13	91	57	51	4th of 22	R2
1978	2L	46	24	11	11	82	48	59	2nd of 24	R1
1979	2L	46	31	4	11	110	50	66	1st of 24	GS
1980	1L	46	18	10	18	68	73	46	11th of 24	R1
1981	1L	46	16	13	17	50	56	44	14th of 24	GS
1982	1L	42	15	7	20	48	67	37	18th of 22	GS
1983	1L	42	19	4	19	52	71	42	9th of 22	R2
1984	1L	42	16	10	16	49	52	42	10th of 22	R1
1985	1L	38	15	7	16	50	52	37	17th of 22	R1
1986	1L	46	28	5	13	80	66	61	2nd of 24↑	R2
1987	TL	30	5	8	17	18	38	18	16th of 16↓	R1
1988	1L	42	23	7	12	71	44	53	4th of 22	R3
1989	1L	42	27	9	6	78	39	63	2nd of 22↑ (Note: Left the Soviet football system to join the national league after this season)	R3
1990	UL	34	22	6	6	73	20	72 (Note: Three points for a win introduced)	2nd of 16 (Note: Highest league finish)	W
1991	UL	19 (Note: One-round season)	14	4	1	38	15	46	2nd of 20	—
1991–92	UL	38	22	3	13	89	56	69	4th of 20	R2
1992–93	UL	32	12	2	18	37	57	38	12th of 17	R2
1993–94	UL West	14	9	0	5	36	22	27	2nd of 8	QF
1993–94	Champ.Group	18	5	2	11	30	50	17	7th of 10	QF
1994–95	UL	30	8	6	16	36	81	30	13th of 16	QF
1995–96	UL	30	9	0	21	35	74	27	13th of 16	R1
1996–97	UL	30	10	3	17	33	63	33	13th of 16	R2
1997–98	UL	30	6	9	15	30	58	27	14th of 16	R2
1998–99	UL	30	3	4	23	34	87	13	16th of 16↓	R1
1999–2000	PL A	22	7	1	14	36	45	22	8th of 12	R2
2000–01	PL LP	22	12	5	5	31	25	41	3rd of 12	R4
2000–01	Champ.Group	10	6	2	2	15	9	20	1st of 6↑	R4
2001–02	UL	22	3	6	13	14	44	15	10th of 13↓	QF
2002–03	PL	30	9	7	14	32	44	34	12th of 16	R2
2003–04	PL	30	13	6	11	38	37	45	10th of 16	R1
2004–05	PL	30	10	8	12	30	45	38	10th of 16	R1
2005–06	PL	34	14	5	15	50	47	47	9th of 18	R1
2006–07	PL	34	8	7	19	36	76	31	15th of 16↓	R1
2007–08	ML West	22	15	6	1	49	17	51	2nd of 13↑	—
2008–09	PL	30	10	5	15	38	41	35	9th of 11	R2
2009–10	PL	28	16	5	7	53	32	53	4th of 15	R1
2010–11	PL	32	14	4	14	50	59	46	7th of 17	R1
2011–12	PL B	18	12	3	3	41	15	39	2nd of 10	R2
2012–13	PL A	33	27	4	2	86	20	85	1st of 12↑	QR
2013–14	UL	32	12	0	20	31	53	36	6th of 12	R3
2014–15	UL	30	10	9	11	38	43	39	9th of 16	R2
2015–16	UL	30	6	9	15	28	49	27	11th of 16	R2
2016	UL White	12	3	2	7	8	21	11	6th of 7↓ (Note: Lost to Dila 2–0 on aggregate in UL relegation playoffs)	R3
2017	L2 (Note: Pirveli Liga was renamed Erovnuli Liga 2 this season)	36	11	4	21	47	68	37	8th of 10↓ (Note: Lost to Telavi 3–2 on aggregate in Liga 2/3 play-offs)	R3
2018	L3 (Note: Meore Liga had been renamed Liga 3 in the previous season)	38	21	10	7	59	31	73	3rd of 20↑ (Note: Beat Samgurali on away goals in Liga 2/3 play-offs)	QR
2019	L2	36	10	6	20	39	64	33 (Note: Three points deducted)	8th of 10↓ (Note: Lost to Aragvi 2–1 on aggregate in Liga 2/3 play-offs)	R3
2020	L3	18	8	2	8	26	30	26	5th of 10	R1
2021	L3	26	8	5	13	33	44	29	11th of 14	R3
2022	L3	30	11	4	15	42	49	37	12th of 16	QF
2023	L3	30	11	6	13	44	55	39	9th of 16	R3
2024	L3	30	5	6	19	30	71	21	16th of 16↓	R1
2025	L4	30	16	9	5	66	29	57	3rd of 16↑ (Note: Lowest league finish)	PR

== Sources ==
- Wildstat
- Football 1987. Georgian CK KP Publishing Company. 1987.
