= 2010–11 Georgian Cup =

Tournament details
- Country: Georgia
- Teams: 28

Final positions
- Champions: Gagra
- Runners-up: Torpedo Kutaisi

The 2010–11 Georgian Cup (also known as the David Kipiani Cup) was the sixty-seventh season overall and twenty-first since independence of the Georgian annual football tournament. The competition began on 24 August 2010 and ended on 26 May 2011. The defending champions were WIT Georgia, who won their first Georgian Cup last season.

== Round of 32 ==
These matches were played on 24 and 25 August 2010.

Team 1	Score	Team 2
Imereti Khoni	0–1	Baia Zugdidi
Mertskhali Ozurgeti	0–4	Torpedo Kutaisi
Norchi Dinamoeli	1–3	Gagra
Magharoeli Chiatura	1–6	Samtredia
Dila Gori	0–0 (a.e.t.) (3–4 p)	Locomotive Tbilisi
Zooveti Tbilisi	0–2	Sioni Bolnisi
Samgurali	0–2	Merani Martvili
Kolkheti Khobi	1–2	Dinamo Batumi
Adeli Batumi	0–2	Kolkheti-1913 Poti
Meshakhte Tkibuli	1–3	Chikhura Sachkere
Iveria Khashuri	0–2	Spartaki Tskhinvali
Skuri Tsalenjikha	2–0	Guria Lanchkhuti

== Round of 16 ==
The 12 winners from the previous round competed in this round, as well as the four teams that finished first, second, third and fourth in last year's Umaglesi Liga, Olimpi Rustavi, Dinamo Tbilisi, Zestaponi and WIT Georgia. These games were played on November 9, 2010.

Team 1	Score	Team 2
Locomotive Tbilisi	0–2	Olimpi Rustavi
Dinamo Batumi	1–2	Zestaponi
Chikhura Sachkere	0–4	Dinamo Tbilisi
Merani Martvili	0–0 (a.e.t.) (2–4 p)	Sioni Bolnisi
Skuri Tsalenjikha	1–2 (a.e.t.)	WIT Georgia
Gagra	1–0	Kolkheti-1913 Poti
Spartaki Tskhinvali	1–0	Samtredia
Torpedo Kutaisi	1–0 (a.e.t.)	Baia Zugdidi

== Quarterfinals ==
The eight winners from the previous round played in this round.

Team 1	Agg.	Team 2	1st leg	2nd leg
WIT Georgia	3–1	Spartaki Tskhinvali	2–1	1–0
Sioni Bolnisi	0–1	Torpedo Kutaisi	0–1	0–0
Gagra	3–3 (a.e.t.) (4–2 p)	Dinamo Tbilisi	1–2	2–1
Zestaponi	3–0	Olimpi Rustavi	3–0	0–0

=== First Legs ===
1 December 2010	WIT Georgia	2–1	Spartaki Tskhinvali	Rustavi
	Bechvaia 34' (pen.); Kasradze 78'		Bolkvadze 90' (pen.)	Stadium: Poladi Stadium; Attendance: 300; Referee: L. Kvaratskhelia

1 December 2010	Sioni Bolnisi	0–1	Torpedo Kutaisi	Bolnisi
			Kvaratskhelia 46'	Stadium: Tamaz Stephania Stadium; Attendance: 500; Referee: D. Kharitonashvili

1 December 2010	Gagra	1–2	Dinamo Tbilisi	Tbilisi
	Sharikadze 45'		Metreveli 7', 14'	Stadium: Meranis Stadioni; Attendance: 300; Referee: G. Vadachkoria

1 December 2010	Zestaponi	3–0	Olimpi Rustavi	Zestaponi
	Gelashvili 31', 80'; Aptsiauri 64'			Stadium: David Abashidze Stadium; Attendance: 2000; Referee: L. Silagava

=== Second Legs ===
15 December 2010	Spartaki Tskhinvali	0–1	WIT Georgia	Gori
			Adamadze 47'	Stadium: Kartlis Stadioni; Attendance: 200; Referee: G. Vadachkoria

15 December 2010	Olimpi Rustavi	0–0	Zestaponi	Rustavi
				Stadium: Poladi Stadium; Attendance: 500; Referee: D. Kharitonashvili

16 December 2010	Dinamo Tbilisi	1–2 (a.e.t.) (2–4 p)	Gagra	Tbilisi
	Mujiri 53'		Owonikoko Seun 14'; Tkeshelashvili 77'	Stadium: Boris Paichadze Stadium; Referee: T. Gvantseladze

16 December 2010	Torpedo Kutaisi	0–0	Sioni Bolnisi	Kutaisi
				Stadium: Givi Kiladze Stadium; Attendance: 1500; Referee: L. Silagava

== Semifinals ==
The four winners from the previous round played in this round.

Team 1	Agg.	Team 2	1st leg	2nd leg
Torpedo Kutaisi	1–0	Zestaponi	1–0	0–0
Gagra	7–2	WIT Georgia	3–0	4–2

=== First Legs ===
19 April 2011	Torpedo Kutaisi	1–0	Zestaponi	Kutaisi
				Stadium: Givi Kiladze Stadium

19 April 2011	Gagra	3–0	WIT Georgia	Tbilisi
	Kvantaliani 16'; Seun 30', 79'			Stadium: Meranis Stadioni; Attendance: 1000; Referee: George Vadachkoria

=== Second Legs ===
4 May 2011	Zestaponi	0–0	Torpedo Kutaisi	Zestaponi
				Stadium: David Abashidze Stadium; Attendance: 5,000

4 May 2011	WIT Georgia	2–4	Gagra	Rustavi
	Chimakadze 45', 80'		Kvantaliani 42'; Seun 56', 69'; Tsitskhvaia 90'	Stadium: Poladi Stadium; Attendance: 1,000

== Final ==
26 May 2011
17:00 UTC+4

Gagra	1–0 (a.e.t.)	Torpedo Kutaisi
Todua 117' (o.g.)

Boris Paichadze Stadium, Tbilisi
Attendance: 12,000
Referee: Levan Kvaratskhelia (Tbilisi)

== See also ==
- 2010–11 Umaglesi Liga
- 2010–11 Pirveli Liga
