= 2007–08 Georgian Cup =

Tournament details
- Country: Georgia
- Teams: 28

Final positions
- Champions: Zestaponi
- Runners-up: Ameri Tbilisi

The 2007–08 Georgian Cup (also known as the David Kipiani Cup) was the sixty-fourth season overall and eighteenth since independence of the Georgian annual football tournament. The competition began on 4 August 2007 and ended with the Final held on 16 May 2008. The defending champions are Ameri Tbilisi.

== First round ==
Team 1	Agg.	Team 2	1st leg	2nd leg
WIT Georgia	3–1	Meshakre Agara	1–0	2–1
Sioni Bolnisi	2–6	Magharoeli Chiatura	0–1	2–5
Locomotive Tbilisi	3–1	Olimpiki Tbilisi	1–0	2–1
Dila Gori	5–0	Zooveti Tbilisi	4–0	1–0
Samtredia	0–5	Mglebi Zugdidi	0–2	0–3
Meskheti Akhaltsikhe	10–0	Skuri Tsalenjikha	10–0	0–0
Merani Tbilisi	3–0	Chikhura Sachkhere	1–0	2–0
Spartaki Tskhinvali	4–4 (a)	Gagra	0–2	4–2
Kakheti Telavi	3–2	Dusheti	3–2	0–0
Borjomi	6–2	Merani Martvili	4–0	2–2
Dinamo Batumi	3–1	Universiteti Kutaisi	3–0	0–1
Torpedo Kutaisi	1–0	Kolkheti-1913 Poti	0–0	1–0

== Group stage ==
=== Group A ===
Pos	Team	Pld	W	D	L	GF	GA	GD	Pts	Qualification	AME	TSK	MES	TKU
1	Ameri Tbilisi	6	5	0	1	18	4	+14	15	Advanced to Quarter-finals		2–0	4–0	6–1
2	Spartaki Tskhinvali	6	4	0	2	9	4	+5	12	Advanced to Quarter-finals	2–1		1–0	4–0
3	Meskheti Akhaltsikhe	6	3	0	3	7	7	0	9		1–2	1–0		4–0
4	Torpedo Kutaisi	6	0	0	6	1	20	−19	0		0–3	0–2	0–1	

Source: rsssf.com

=== Group B ===
Pos	Team	Pld	W	D	L	GF	GA	GD	Pts	Qualification	DTB	MGH	WIT	LOC
1	Dinamo Tbilisi	6	4	1	1	16	8	+8	13	Advanced to Quarter-finals		2–0	3–2	7–2
2	Magharoeli Chiatura	6	3	2	1	6	3	+3	11	Advanced to Quarter-finals	0–0		1–1	3–0
3	WIT Georgia	6	3	1	2	13	7	+6	10		3–2	0–1		3–0
4	Locomotive Tbilisi	6	0	0	6	3	20	−17	0		1–2	0–1	0–4	

Source: rsssf.com

=== Group C ===
Pos	Team	Pld	W	D	L	GF	GA	GD	Pts	Qualification	BOR	RUS	DBT	MER
1	Borjomi	6	4	0	2	9	7	+2	12	Advanced to Quarter-finals		2–1	2–0	1–0
2	Olimpi Rustavi	6	3	1	2	6	5	+1	10	Advanced to Quarter-finals	3–1		1–0	0–2
3	Dinamo Batumi	6	2	1	3	3	5	−2	7		2–1	0–1		0–0
4	Merani Tbilisi	6	1	2	3	3	4	−1	5		1–2	0–0	0–1	

Source: rsssf.com

=== Group D ===
Pos	Team	Pld	W	D	L	GF	GA	GD	Pts	Qualification	ZES	DIL	MGL	KAK
1	Zestaponi	6	4	1	1	16	6	+10	13	Advanced to Quarter-finals		3–0	6–3	4–0
2	Dila Gori	6	3	2	1	10	6	+4	11	Advanced to Quarter-finals	1–1		1–0	4–0
3	Mglebi Zugdidi	6	3	1	2	11	10	+1	10		2–0	1–1		3–1
4	Kakheti Telavi	6	0	0	6	3	18	−15	0		0–2	1–3	1–2	

Source: rsssf.com

== Quarterfinals ==
The matches were played from 17 to 19 February (first legs) and on 11 and 12 March 2008 (second legs).

Team 1	Agg.	Team 2	1st leg	2nd leg
Olimpi Rustavi	0–2	Zestaponi	0–1	0–1
Dila Gori	4–5	Borjomi	3–2	1–3
Spartaki Tskhinvali	1–2	Dinamo Tbilisi	0–0	1–2
Magharoeli Chiatura	1–6	Ameri Tbilisi	1–2	0–4

== Semifinals ==
The matches were played on 8 and 9 April (first legs) and 7 May 2008 (second legs).

Team 1	Agg.	Team 2	1st leg	2nd leg
Dinamo Tbilisi	1–2	Zestaponi	1–1	0–1
Ameri Tbilisi	5–2	Borjomi	4–1	1–1

== Final ==
16 May 2008

Zestaponi	2–1	Ameri Tbilisi
Oniani 57'; Gotsiridze 62'		Tatanashvili 88'

Boris Paichadze Stadium, Tbilisi
Attendance: 25,000
Referee: Levan Paniashvili (Tbilisi)

== See also ==
- 2007–08 Umaglesi Liga
- 2007–08 Pirveli Liga
