= 2010–11 Umaglesi Liga =

Umaglesi Liga
- Season: 2010–11
- Dates: 14 August 2010 – 22 May 2011
- Champions: Zestaponi; 1st Georgian title
- Relegated: Samtredia
- Champions League: Zestaponi
- Europa League: Dinamo Tbilisi; Olimpi Rustavi
- Matches: 180
- Goals: 392 (2.18 per match)
- Top goalscorer: Nikoloz Gelashvili (18)
- Biggest home win: Zestaponi 7–0 Samtredia
- Biggest away win: WIT 0–4 Olimpi
- Highest scoring: Dinamo Tbilisi 7–1 Samtredia

The 2010–11 Umaglesi Liga was the 22nd season of top-tier football in Georgia. It began on 14 August 2010 and ended on 22 May 2011. Olimpi Rustavi are the defending champions, having won their second Georgian championship last season. FC Zestaponi claimed their first title.

The league size was expanded from 10 teams in that season to 12 teams in following season. Therefore, there was no direct relegation to the Pirveli Liga in that season.

== Teams ==
Lokomotivi Tbilisi and Gagra were relegated to Pirveli Liga at the end of last season after finishing in 9th and 10th place respectively.

Promoted to Georgia's top football division were Pirveli Liga champions Torpedo 2008 Kutaisi and runners-up Kolkheti Poti.

Spartaki Tskhinvali play their home matches in Gori due to various inner-Georgian conflicts. FC WIT Georgia play their home matches from this season on in the newly built WIT Georgia Stadium in the city of Mtskheta

Location of teams in 2010–11 Umaglesi Liga

Team	Location	Venue	Capacity
FC Baia	Zugdidi	Gulia Tutberidze Stadium	5,000
FC Dinamo	Tbilisi	Boris Paichadze Stadium	54,549
FC Kolkheti	Poti	Fazisi Stadium	6,000
FC Olimpi	Rustavi	Poladi Stadium	6,000
FC Samtredia	Samtredia	Erosi Manjgaladze Stadium	15,000
FC Sioni	Bolnisi	Tamaz Stephania Stadium	3,000
FC Spartaki	Gori	Kartli Stadium	1,500
FC Torpedo	Kutaisi	Givi Kiladze Stadium	14,700
FC WIT Georgia	Tbilisi	Shevardeni Stadium	4,000
FC Zestaponi	Zestaponi	David Abashidze Stadium	4,558

== League table ==
Pos	Team	Pld	W	D	L	GF	GA	GD	Pts	Qualification or relegation
1	Zestaponi (C)	36	24	6	6	72	19	+53	78	Qualification for the Champions League second qualifying round
2	Dinamo Tbilisi	36	21	9	6	55	22	+33	72	Qualification for the Europa League first qualifying round
3	Olimpi Rustavi	36	20	6	10	52	31	+21	66	Qualification for the Europa League first qualifying round
4	Torpedo Kutaisi	36	14	13	9	31	22	+9	55	
5	WIT Georgia	36	14	6	16	35	41	−6	48	
6	Baia Zugdidi	36	13	5	18	36	51	−15	44	
7	Kolkheti Poti	36	10	10	16	25	47	−22	40	
8	Sioni Bolnisi	36	10	9	17	27	45	−18	39	
9	Spartaki Tskhinvali (O)	36	7	11	18	32	42	−10	32	Qualification to Relegation play-offs
10	Samtredia (R)	36	6	7	23	27	72	−45	25	Qualification to Relegation play-offs

Source: Soccerway
Rules for classification: 1) points; 2) goal difference; 3) number of goals scored.
FC Gagra of the Pirveli Liga are the winners of the 2010–11 Georgian Cup and qualify for the second qualifying round of UEFA Europa League.
(C) Champions; (O) Play-off winners; (R) Relegated

== Results ==
The ten teams played each other four times in this league for a total of 36 matches per team. In the first half of the season each team played every other team twice (home and away) and then did the same in the second half of the season.

=== First half of season ===
Home \ Away	BAI	DIN	KOL	OLI	SAM	SIO	SPA	TKU	WIT	ZES
Baia Zugdidi		0–0	2–1	0–1	3–1	2–2	1–1	1–0	1–0	2–1
Dinamo Tbilisi	0–0		5–0	1–1	3–2	2–0	1–0	1–0	2–0	2–1
Kolkheti Poti	1–0	1–3		5–1	1–0	0–0	1–0	0–1	2–0	0–2
Olimpi Rustavi	2–0	1–0	2–0		3–0	3–1	2–0	0–0	2–1	1–0
Samtredia	3–1	1–0	1–1	1–1		0–1	1–0	1–0	1–0	1–3
Sioni Bolnisi	1–3	1–0	0–0	2–1	1–0		2–0	0–0	0–0	1–3
Spartaki Tskhinvali	2–0	0–0	4–0	2–3	2–2	3–0		1–2	1–2	1–1
Torpedo Kutaisi	1–0	1–1	0–0	1–1	0–0	0–0	1–0		0–1	1–0
WIT Georgia	2–1	0–1	5–1	0–4	4–2	1–0	0–1	1–0		0–2
Zestaponi	6–1	0–1	2–0	1–0	7–0	4–0	4–0	2–1	3–0	

Source: Soccerway
Legend: Blue = home team win; Yellow = draw; Red = away team win.

=== Second half of season ===
Home \ Away	BAI	DIN	KOL	OLI	SAM	SIO	SPA	TKU	WIT	ZES
Baia Zugdidi		1–2	1–0	3–1	4–1	1–0	2–0	1–0	1–0	1–3
Dinamo Tbilisi	2–1		4–2	2–0	7–1	1–0	1–1	1–2	1–1	0–0
Kolkheti Poti	2–1	0–2		0–0	2–1	1–0	0–0	1–1	0–2	1–4
Olimpi Rustavi	2–0	1–0	0–1		4–0	2–1	1–0	1–1	2–1	1–2
Samtredia	3–0	1–2	0–0	0–4		1–1	0–0	0–1	0–1	0–1
Sioni Bolnisi	1–0	0–2	2–0	1–0	5–0		1–1	1–4	1–2	1–0
Spartaki Tskhinvali	3–0	1–3	0–0	0–2	1–0	3–0		2–2	0–1	1–2
Torpedo Kutaisi	2–0	0–0	1–0	2–1	2–1	2–0	1–0		0–0	0–0
WIT Georgia	1–1	0–2	0–1	0–1	2–0	3–0	1–1	2–1		1–1
Zestaponi	3–0	1–0	0–0	2–0	4–1	0–0	2–0	1–0	4–0	

Source: Soccerway
Legend: Blue = home team win; Yellow = draw; Red = away team win.

== Relegation play-offs ==
Due to the expansion of the league for next season, the 9th and 10th-place finishers of this competition (Spartaki Tskhinvali and Samtredia, respectively) will play single matches against the 3rd and 4th-place finishers of this season's Pirveli Liga competition (Dila Gori and Chikhura Sachkhere, respectively). The winners of these two matches will participate in this competition next season.

29 May 2011
16:00 UTC+4

Chikhura Sachkhere	1 – 2	Spartaki Tskhinvali
Gvetadze 61'	Report	Metreveli 8'; Buzaladze 27'

Boris Paichadze Stadium, Tbilisi
Attendance: 2,000
Referee: Lasha Silagava

30 May 2011
16:00 UTC+4

Dila Gori	2 – 0	Samtredia
Razhamashvili 45', 48'	Report

Boris Paichadze Stadium, Tbilisi
Attendance: 1,500
Referee: Malkhaz Beuklishvili

== Top goalscorers ==
Including matches played on 1 May 2011

Rank	Goalscorer	Team	Goals
1	(Georgia (country)) Nikoloz Gelashvili	Zestaponi	18
2	(Georgia (country)) Irakli Modebadze	Olimpi Rustavi	16
3	(Georgia (country)) Rati Tsinamdzgvrishvili	Zestaponi	13
4	(Georgia (country)) Giorgi Megreladze	Torpedo Kutaisi	13
5	(Georgia (country)) Jaba Dvali	Zestaponi	12
6	(Georgia (country)) Aleksandre Koshkadze	Dinamo Tbilisi	8
6	(Georgia (country)) Levan Khmaladze	Dinamo Tbilisi	8
8	(Georgia (country)) Giga Bechvaia	WIT Georgia	7
8	(Georgia (country)) Zviad Metreveli	Spartaki Tskhinvali	7
10	(Georgia (country)) Jaba Lipartia	WIT Georgia	6
10	(Georgia (country)) Besik Chimakadze	WIT Georgia	6

== Attendances ==
No.	Club	Average
1	Torpedo Kutaisi	3,433
2	Zestafoni	1,922
3	Samtredia	1,117
4	Kolkheti	972
5	Zugdidi	931
6	Rustavi	850
7	Dinamo Tbilisi	672
8	Sioni Bolnisi	644
9	WIT Georgia	317
10	Spartaki Tskhinvali	239

== See also ==
- 2010–11 Pirveli Liga
- 2010–11 Georgian Cup
