= Nikoloz Gelashvili =

Georgian footballer

Personal information
- Full name: Nikoloz Gelashvili
- Date of birth: 5 August 1985 (age 41)
- Place of birth: Telavi, Georgian SSR, Soviet Union
- Height: 1.84 m (6 ft 0 in)
- Position: Forward

Senior career*
Years	Team	Apps	(Gls)
2003–2004	WIT-Georgia Mtskheta	6	(0)
2004–2005	Kakheti Telavi	28	(8)
2005–2007	WIT Georgia Tbilisi	51	(25)
2008–2012	Zestaponi	105	(63)
2012–2013	VfL Bochum	25	(2)
2013–2014	Qarabağ	26	(6)
2014–2015	Flamurtari Vlorë	10	(2)
2015–2016	Pafos	14	(4)
2016	Dinamo Tbilisi	9	(1)
2016	FC Dila Gori	5	(0)
2017	Chikhura Sachkhere	10	(0)

International career
2005–2006	Georgia U21	7	(1)
2007–2015	Georgia	24	(1)
- * Club domestic league appearances and goals

Nikoloz Gelashvili (Georgian: ნიკოლოზ გელაშვილი; born 5 August 1985) is a Georgian former footballer who played as a forward.

== Club career ==
Gelashvili joined Zestaponi in January 2008.

=== Flamurtari ===
In June 2014 Gelashvili left Qarabağ after one season with the club, and signed a one-year contract, with the option of another year, with Flamurtari Vlorë.

He debuted with Flamurtari on 23 August 2014 in week one of 2014–15 Albanian Superliga where he come as substitute in place of Nijaz Lena during a 2–1 win over Teuta Durrës. He scored his first goal with club on 10 September in a 3–0 success over Apolonia. He scored his second goal on 20 September in a 2–0 away win against KF Elbasani.

=== Pafos and Dinamo Tbilisi ===
In July 2015 Gelashvili signed with Pafos. After half season he moved to Dinamo Tbilisi.

== International career ==
Gelashvili made his national team debut on 16 November 2007 against Qatar, which he was call-up to both matches in November. He played another match on 9 September 2009. On 10 October 2009, he played his first 2010 FIFA World Cup qualification.

On 14 October 2014, after seven years as international footballer, Gelashvili scored his first ever goal with Georgia during a 3–0 win away against Gibraltar, match valid for Group D of UEFA Euro 2016 qualifying.

== Career statistics ==
=== Club ===
Appearances and goals by club, season and competition
Club	Season	League			Cup		Continental		Total	
Club	Season	Division	Apps	Goals	Apps	Goals	Apps	Goals	Apps	Goals
WIT Georgia	2003–04	Pirveli Liga	6	0			—			
Kakheti Telavi	2004–05	Pirveli Liga	24	8			—			
Kakheti Telavi	2005–06	Umaglesi Liga	4	0			—			
Kakheti Telavi	Total		28	8			0	0		
WIT Georgia	2005–06	Umaglesi Liga	21	7			0	0		
WIT Georgia	2006–07	Umaglesi Liga	17	10			2	0		
WIT Georgia	2007–08	Umaglesi Liga	13	8			—			
WIT Georgia	Total		51	25			2	0		
FC Zestaponi-2	2007–08	Pirveli Liga	3	1	0	0	—		3	1
FC Zestaponi	2007–08	Umaglesi Liga	6	2	0	0	0	0	6	2
FC Zestaponi	2008–09	Umaglesi Liga	26	20	2	2	2	0	30	22
FC Zestaponi	2009–10	Umaglesi Liga	31	16	2	0	4	4	37	20
FC Zestaponi	2010–11	Umaglesi Liga	33	18	3	2	6	2	42	22
FC Zestaponi	2011–12	Umaglesi Liga	10	7	2	0	6	4	18	11
FC Zestaponi	Total		106	63	9	4	18	10	133	77
VfL Bochum	2011–12	2. Bundesliga	13	1	0	0	—		13	1
VfL Bochum	2012–13	2. Bundesliga	12	1	2	0	—		14	1
VfL Bochum	Total		25	2	2	0	0	0	27	2
VfL Bochum II	2012–13	Regionalliga West	2	0	—		—		2	0
Qarabağ FK	2013–14	Azerbaijan Premier League	26	5	0	0	8	0	34	5
Flamurtari Vlorë	2014–15	Albanian Superliga	0	0	0	0	0	0	0	0
Career total			247	105			28	10		

=== International ===
Scores and results list Georgia's goal tally first.

#	Date	Venue	Opponent	Score	Result	Competition
1	14 October 2014	Estádio Algarve, Faro, Portugal	Gibraltar	1–0	3–0	UEFA Euro 2016 qualification

== Honours ==
Dinamo Tbilisi:

- Umaglesi Liga: 2015–16
- Georgian Cup: 2014–15, 2015–16

Zestaponi:

- Umaglesi Liga: 2010–11
- Georgian Super Cup runner-up: 2008–09

WIT Georgia:

- Umaglesi Liga runner-up: 2005–06, 2007–08
- Georgian Super Cup: 2008–09

Qarabağ

- Azerbaijan Premier League:: 2013–14

Flamurtari Vlorë:

- Albanian Supercup runner-up: 2014–15
