= 2000–01 Georgian Cup =

Tournament details
- Country: Georgia
- Teams: 53

Final positions
- Champions: Torpedo Kutaisi
- Runners-up: Locomotive Tbilisi

The 2000–01 Georgian Cup (also known as the David Kipiani Cup) was the fifty-seventh season overall and eleventh since independence of the Georgian annual football tournament.

== Round of 16 ==
The first legs were played on 7 November and the second legs were played on 12 November 2000.

Team 1	Agg.	Team 2	1st leg	2nd leg
Torpedo Kutaisi	4–2	Dinamo Batumi	2–0	2–2
Dinamo Tbilisi	4–2	Sioni Bolnisi	4–0	0–2
Guria Lanchkhuti	0–6	Locomotive Tbilisi	0–1	0–5
FC Tbilisi	1–2	Merani Tbilisi	0–1	1–1
Kolkheti-1913 Poti	10–1	Metalurgi Zestaponi	6–0	4–1
Dila Gori	3–1	Gorda Rustavi	2–0	1–1
WIT Georgia	7–1	Dinamo Zugdidi	3–0	4–1
Samgurali Tskaltubo	2–0	TSU Tbilisi	2–0	0–0

== Quarterfinals ==
The matches were played on 6 December (first legs) and 10 December 2000 (second legs).

Team 1	Agg.	Team 2	1st leg	2nd leg
Kolkheti-1913 Poti	1–2	Torpedo Kutaisi	1–1	0–1
Dinamo Tbilisi	0–1	WIT Georgia	0–1	0–0
Samgurali Tskaltubo	2–2 (a)	Locomotive Tbilisi	1–2	1–0
Dila Gori	4–8	Merani Tbilisi	1–2	3–6

== Semifinals ==
The matches were played on 1 May (first legs) and 15 May 2001 (second legs).

Team 1	Agg.	Team 2	1st leg	2nd leg
WIT Georgia	1–3	Torpedo Kutaisi	1–2	0–1
Locomotive Tbilisi	3–0	Merani Tbilisi	2–0	1–0

== Final ==
26 May 2001

Torpedo Kutaisi	0–0 (a.e.t.)	Locomotive Tbilisi
Penalties
	4–3

Boris Paichadze Stadium, Tbilisi
Attendance: 35,000
Referee: Merab Malaghuradze (Tbilisi)

== See also ==
- 2000–01 Umaglesi Liga
