= 1997–98 Georgian Cup =

Tournament details
- Country: Georgia
- Teams: 60

Final positions
- Champions: Dinamo Batumi
- Runners-up: Dinamo Tbilisi

The 1997–98 Georgian Cup (also known as the David Kipiani Cup) was the fifty-fourth season overall and eighth since independence of the Georgian annual football tournament.

== Round of 32 ==
| Team 1 | Agg. | Team 2 | 1st leg | 2nd leg |
|---|---|---|---|---|
| Locomotive Tbilisi | 15–1 | Kodako Tbilisi | 6–0 | 9–1 |
| Metalurgi Rustavi | 2–2 (a) | MVD Academy Tbilisi | 2–2 | 0–0 |
| Morkinali Tbilisi | 4–2 | Tskhinvali | 3–1 | 1–1 |
| Margveti Zestaponi | 3–4 | Juba Samtredia | 2–0 | 1–4 |
| Torpedo Kutaisi | 12–0 | Okros Satsmisi | 7–0 | 5–0 |
| Odishi Zugdidi | 9–3 | Skuri Tsalenjikha | 6–1 | 3–2 |
| Dila Gori | 6–2 | Iveria Khashuri | 4–0 | 2–2 |
| Guria Lanchkhuti | 3–3 (a) | Mertskhali Ozurgeti | 1–1 | 2–2 |
| Sioni Bolnisi | 2–1 | SKA Tbilisi | 1–0 | 1–1 |
| Samgurali Tskaltubo | 0–8 (a) | Kolkheti Khobi | 2–2 | 0–0 |
| Magharoeli Chiatura | 7–5 | Meshakre Agara | 2–2 | 5–3 |
| Zhineri Zhinvali | 0–6 | TSU Tbilisi | 0–1 | 0–5 |

== Round of 16 ==
| Team 1 | Agg. | Team 2 | 1st leg | 2nd leg |
|---|---|---|---|---|
| Dila Gori | 3–1 | Torpedo Kutaisi | 3–1 | 0–0 |
| Dinamo Tbilisi | 4–2 | Morkinali Tbilisi | 3–0 | 1–2 |
| Juba Samtredia | 5–4 | Odishi Zugdidi | 2–0 | 3–4 |
| Dinamo Batumi | 5–1 | Merani-91 Tbilisi | 3–0 | 2–1 |
| TSU Tbilisi | 4–3 | Locomotive Tbilisi | 1–0 | 3–3 |
| Sioni Bolnisi | 2–3 | Magharoeli Chiatura | 2–1 | 0–2 |
| Kolkheti-1913 Poti | 4–2 | MVD Academy Tbilisi | 3–1 | 1–1 |
| Guria Lanchkhuti | 3–3 (a) | Kolkheti Khobi | 3–1 | 0–2 |

== Quarterfinals ==
| Team 1 | Agg. | Team 2 | 1st leg | 2nd leg |
|---|---|---|---|---|
| Iberia Samtredia | 1–8 | Dinamo Tbilisi | 1–0 | 0–8 |
| Kolkheti-1913 Poti | 3–4 | TSU Tbilisi | 0–3 | 3–1 |
| Magharoeli Chiatura | 1–2 | Dila Gori | 1–2 | 0–0 |
| Kolkheti Khobi | 0–11 | Dinamo Batumi | 0–5 | 0–6 |

== Semifinals ==
| Team 1 | Agg. | Team 2 | 1st leg | 2nd leg |
|---|---|---|---|---|
| Dinamo Tbilisi | 4–3 | Dila Gori | 1–2 | 3–1 |
| Dinamo Batumi | 4–1 | TSU Tbilisi | 1–0 | 3–1 |

== Final ==
26 May 1998

| Dinamo Tbilisi | 1–2 (a.e.t.) | Dinamo Batumi |
|---|---|---|
| Aleksidze 35' | | Kantidze 14'; Chichveishvili 120' |

Boris Paichadze Stadium, Tbilisi
Attendance: 20,000
Referee: Sergo Kvaratskhelia (Zugdidi)

== See also ==
- 1997–98 Umaglesi Liga
