= FC Kolkheti-1913 Poti =

Kolkheti Poti
- Founded: 1913; 113 years ago
- Ground: Fazisi Stadium; Poti, Georgia
- Capacity: 6,000
- Chairman: Zaza Inashvili
- Manager: Revaz Gotsiridze
- League: Erovnuli Liga 2
- 2025: 10th of 10, Erovnuli Liga (relegated)
- Website: kolkheti1913.ge
Home colours	Away colours	Third colours

FC Kolkheti 1913, commonly referred to as Kolkheti Poti, is a Georgian football club based in Poti. Following the 2025 season, the team was relegated to the Erovnuli Liga 2, the 2nd division of Georgian football.

Being registered in 1913, Kolkheti is the oldest active football club in the country. They are the two-time winners of the Soviet republican championship. After an independent Umaglesi Liga was formed in 1990, Kolkheti joined it as a 3rd-tier club and subsequently spent 17 successive seasons before worsening financial problems resulted in their first relegation. As the club's decline continued, it dropped into the third division by 2020. Kolkheti had two unsuccessful playoff campaigns in Liga 3 before securing two consecutive promotions.

Their first European tie was against Serbian club Zemun in 1996. The club plays its home games at Fazisi Stadium.

== History ==
=== Domestic leagues ===
==== The Soviet period ====
The football club from Poti under the name Kolkhida (Colchis) for many years was a member of the Georgian Soviet championship until early 1960s. From 1962 to 1990, they spent 24 seasons in fourth and third divisions of the Soviet football system, including last consecutive eleven years in zone 9 of the Second League, with the 2nd place in 1989 being the best result.

==== Earning league trophies ====
When GFF formed the national league in early 1990, Kolkheti-1913 took part in an opening game against Iberia Tbilisi. The historic match held at the Boris Paichadze stadium ended 1–0 in favour of the guest team. Therefore, Kolkheti became the first club to win a game in the history of Georgian national leagues.

Throughout the first decade, the Kolkhs were considered one of the strongest rivals. Apart from 1992–93, when they finished in 9th place, the club completed each season among top five teams with twice, in 1993–94 and 1996–97, coming second. In this period the team also earned the bronze medals three times.

This success of the club was largely contributed to their sponsors from the mid-1990s, the naval port of Poti.

==== Crisis begins ====
In 2006, after a foreign business company took over the port administration, the football club abruptly lost a significant income. Despite being 10th among 16 clubs in 2005–06, due to the severe financial crisis Kolkheti had to quit the league.

The club climbed back to the Umaglesi Liga following the 2009–10 season, but returned to the second league three years later. In 2011, a sponsorship deal with the naval port resumed to a less extent, which lasted for four years.

==== Battle for survival ====
Kolkheti were back in the top division in 2014–15, although further financial difficulties hit the club in 2018, which pushed them to the verge of bankruptcy. As Kolkheti amassed a large amount of debts, they were deducted six points. Eventually, the team was relegated.

While in Liga 2, Kolkheti still could not afford to pay off debts. In an emergency statement, the club appealed for urgent help. Meanwhile, they were slapped with another six-point deduction. The overall situation badly affected the team. Three managers were sacked for unsatisfactory results within initial five months of the season. The tide remained unchanged, though. Only in the last matchday did Kolkheti manage to avoid automatic relegation, but after being thrashed by Samgurali in play-offs they slumped to the third division.

==== Disappointment and triumph ====
In the initial two seasons Kolkheti were among primary promotion-chasers, although in both cases they suffered a setback in pursuit for an automatic promotion spot. The play-off results proved also unsuccessful despite the team's unbeaten aggregate score in the regular time. First they failed to beat WIT Georgia on penalties, and a year later lost in extra time to Rustavi on away goals.

In 2022, too, Kolkheti ended up in the 2nd place. However, due to changes made in the competition format before this season, the club ended its three-year tenure in this division and won automatic promotion back to Liga 2. This year another event occurred which had a big impact on Kolkheti. On 29 August, the municipal club was handed over to a company linked to football manager Mamuka Jugeli.

Kolkheti achieved a remarkable success in 2023. While reaching the national cup semifinals, the team under head coach Davit Kvirkvelia emerged victorious after a dramatic hard-fought battle against Gareji for the first place, which enabled them to return to the Erovnuli Liga after a five-year absence.

=== European competitions ===
Based on successful performance in Umaglesi Liga, Kolkheti-1913 represented Georgia on UEFA Cup for four consecutive seasons from 1996 until 2000.

The only victory achieved in this competition against Dinamo Minsk was insufficient for qualifying for the next round. Having lost the first leg 1–0, Kolkheti conceded an early goal at home and scored twice afterwards, but the away goals rule gave a final advantage to their opponents.

Season	Competition	Round	Club	Home	Away	Aggregate
1996	UEFA Intertoto Cup	GS	(Federal Republic of Yugoslavia) Zemun	2–3	-	5th
1996	UEFA Intertoto Cup	GS	(Finland) FF Jaro	-	0–2	5th
1996	UEFA Intertoto Cup	GS	(France) Guingamp	1–3	-	5th
1996	UEFA Intertoto Cup	GS	(Romania) Dinamo București	-	0–2	5th
1997–98	UEFA Cup	1Q	(Belarus) Dinamo Minsk	2–1	0–1	2–2
1998–99	UEFA Cup	1Q	(Federal Republic of Yugoslavia) Red Star Belgrade	0–4	0–7	0–11
1999	UEFA Intertoto Cup	1R	(North Macedonia) Cementarnica 55	0–4	2–4	2–8

== Seasons ==
Year	Div.	Pos	P	W	D	L	GF–GA	Pts	Cup
1990	1st	5_{/18}	34	19	5	10	53-31	62	Quarterfinals
1991	1st	4_{/20}	19	10	3	6	30-19	33	—
1991/92	1st	5_{/20}	38	15	11	12	49-45	56	Round of 32
1992/93	1st	9_{/17}	32	12	6	14	47-45	42	Round of 16
1993/94	1st, Group West	1_{/8}	14	9	2	3	36-21	29	Semifinals
1993/94	1-10 Places	2_{/10}	18	14	2	2	51-20	44	Semifinals
1994/95	1st	3_{/16}	30	20	3	7	72-28	63	Round of 32
1995/96	1st	3_{/16}	30	22	2	6	69-38	68	Quarterfinals
1996/97	1st	2_{/16}	30	20	4	6	75-28	64	Quarterfinals
1997/98	1st	3_{/16}	30	17	6	7	56-27	57	Quarterfinals
1998/99	1st	4_{/16}	30	15	7	8	57-36	52	Round of 16
1999/2000	1st, Group B	2_{/8}	14	8	1	5	19-15	25	Quarterfinals
1999/2000	1-8 Places	5_{/8}	14	7	3	4	18-10	37	Quarterfinals
2000/01	1st	6_{/12}	22	8	7	7	22-18	31	Quarterfinals
2000/01	1-6 Places	5_{/6}	10	2	2	6	10-19	24	Quarterfinals
2001/02	1st	5_{/12}	22	10	5	7	32-29	35	Round of 16
2001/02	1-6 Places	4_{/6}	10	2	2	6	9-16	26	Round of 16
2002/03	1st	6_{/12}	22	9	3	10	28-33	30	Round of 16
2002/03	1-6 Places	6_{/6}	10	0	5	5	5-23	20	Round of 16
2003/04	1st	9_{/12}	22	7	3	12	18-35	24	Round of 16
2003/04	7-12 Places	8_{/12}	10	6	3	1	14-6	33	Round of 16
2004/05	1st	9_{/10}	36	9	5	22	32-63	32	Quarterfinals
2005/06	1st	10_{/16}↓ (Note: Relegated due to financial problems)	30	9	5	16	26-35	32	Quarterfinals
2006/07	—	—	—	—	—	—	—	—	—
2007/08	2nd	5_{/10}	27	11	7	9	36-33	40	1st Round
2008/09	2nd	5_{/11}	30	13	6	11	45-40	45	Round of 16
2009/10	2nd, Group A	2_{/15}↑	28	19	4	5	63-21	61	Quarterfinals
2010/11	1st	7_{/10}	36	10	10	16	25-47	40	Round of 16
2011/12	1st	8_{/12}	22	6	8	8	19-24	26	Round of 16
2012/13	1st	10_{/10}	22	0	4	18	11-43	4	Round of 16
2012/13	Relegation round	6_{/6}↓	32	3	8	21	22-56	17	Round of 16
2013/14	2nd, Group A	2_{/13}↑	24	17	4	3	51-13	55	2nd Round
2014/15	1st	10_{/16}	30	9	10	11	31-31	37	2nd Round
2015/16	1st	12_{/16}	30	7	6	17	21-41	27	2nd Round
2016	1st, Group Red	4_{/7}	12	6	0	6	10-18	18	Quarterfinals
2017	1st	9_{/10} (Note: Beat Merani Martvili 4–3 on aggregate in Liga 1/2 playoffs)	36	6	8	22	31-73	26	5th Round
2018	1st	10_{/10}↓	36	4	8	24	26-76	14 (Note: Six points deducted)	3rd Round
2019	2nd	9_{/10} (Note: Beaten by Samgurali 9–0 on aggregate in 1/2 playoffs)↓	36	10	4	22	31-80	28 (Note: Six points deducted)	3rd Round
2020	3rd	2_{/10} (Note: Lost to WIT Georgia on penalties in Liga 2/3 playoffs)	18	12	2	4	47-18	38	2nd Round
2021	3rd	2_{/10} (Note: Lost to Rustavi on away goals in Liga 2/3 playoffs)	26	14	7	5	54-28	49	2nd Round
2022	3rd	2_{/16}↑	30	21	6	3	76-29	69	3rd Round
2023	2nd	1_{/16}↑	36	23	8	5	70-28	77	Semifinals
2024	1st	6_{/10}	36	9	14	13	48-58	41	Semifinals
2025	1st	10_{/10}↓	36	5	7	24	33-71	22	Round of 16

=== Overall ===
Seasons spent in Georgian leagues since 1990:

• Umaglesi Liga / Erovnuli Liga (1st tier): 26

• Pirveli Liga / Erovnuli Liga 2 (2nd tier): 7

• Meore Liga / Liga 3 (3rd tier): 3

Correct up to 2026 season

== Current squad ==
As of 18 March 2026

Note: Flags indicate national team as defined under FIFA eligibility rules; some limited exceptions apply. Players may hold more than one non-FIFA nationality.

No.	Pos.	Nation	Player
1	GK	GEO	Luka Nanava
2	DF	GEO	Luka Elbakidze
3	DF	GEO	Saba Kharchilava
4	DF	GEO	Juba Dvalishvili
5	DF	GEO	Giorgi Kvirkvelia
6	MF	GEO	Nikoloz Tskhovrebashvili
7	MF	GEO	Dito Pachulia
8	MF	UKR	Roman Plyushch
9	FW	GEO	Sandro Avaliani
10	MF	GEO	Giorgi Kharebava
11	FW	GEO	Nikolas-Nika Kapanadze
12	MF	NGR	Tim Oloko-Obi
15	DF	UKR	Oleksandr Komar
17	MF	GEO	Nika Kapanadze

No.	Pos.	Nation	Player
18	DF	GEO	Davit Inaishvili
19	MF	GEO	Shota Gvarjaladze
20	MF	GEO	Davit Andguladze
21	DF	GEO	Davit Paghava
22	DF	GEO	Mate Topadze
23	DF	GEO	Saba Jincharauli
24	DF	GEO	Akaki Giunashvili
25	GK	GEO	Soso Kopaliani
26	FW	CMR	Graham Metuk
27	DF	GEO	Davit Tsetskhladze
29	FW	UKR	Vladislav Ostrovskiy
30	DF	GEO	Tornike Shekiladze
31	GK	GEO	Saba Tsartsidze
33	MF	GEO	Giorgi Dgebia

=== Out on loan ===
Note: Flags indicate national team as defined under FIFA eligibility rules; some limited exceptions apply. Players may hold more than one non-FIFA nationality.

No.	Pos.	Nation	Player
—	MF	GEO	Giorgi Abuashvili (at Metz until the summer of 2027)
—	MF	GEO	Andria Bartishvili (at Iberia 1999 until the end of 2026)

== Topscorers ==
Year	Div.	Name	Goals
2023	2nd	Data Sitchinava	17
2024	1st	Kirill Klimov	10
2025	1st	Giorgi Abuashvili	8

== Managers ==
Name	Nat.	From	To
Soso Pilia	(Georgia (country))	November 2012	June 2013
Zaza Inashvili	(Georgia (country))	July 2013	October 2015
Gela Sanaia	(Georgia (country))	October 2015	August 2017
Oleksandr Shtelin	(Ukraine)	September 2017	December 2017
Konstantin Galkin	(Russia)	February 2018	March 2018
Nugzar Tvaradze	(Georgia (country))	March 2018	September 2018
Viktor Demidov	(Russia)	September 2018	December 2018
Paata Metreveli	(Georgia (country))	February 2019	April 2019
Soso Pilia (2)	(Georgia (country))	April 2019	June 2019
Giorgi Krasovski	(Georgia (country))	June 2019	August 2019
Nugzar Tvaradze	(Georgia (country))	August 2019	October 2019
Vladimer Chkonia	(Georgia (country))	October 2019	December 2019
Davit Makharadze	(Georgia (country))	February 2020	October 2020
Nugzar Tvaradze	(Georgia (country))	October 2020	December 2020
Giorgi Krasovski (2)	(Georgia (country))	February 2021	June 2021
Gia Gigatadze	(Georgia (country))	June 2021	May 2022
Davit Kvirkvelia	(Georgia (country))	June 2022	April 2024
Klimenti Tsitaishvili (interim)	(Georgia (country))	April 2024	May 2024
Kakhaber Chkhetiani	(Georgia (country))	May 2024	August 2025
Davit Kvirkvelia (2)	(Georgia (country))	August 2025	March 2026
Tamaz Pertia	(Georgia (country))	March 2026	June 2026
Ivan Balan (caretaker)	(Ukraine)	July 2026	August 2026
Revaz Gotsiridze	(Georgia (country))	September 2026	

== Honours ==
=== Soviet leagues ===
- Soviet Second League Zone IX (Tier 3)
  - Runners-up (1): 1989
  - Third place (4): 1982, 1983, 1984, 1987
- Georgian Soviet Championship (Tier 4)
  - Winners (2): 1978, 1988

=== Georgian leagues ===
- Umaglesi Liga (Tier 1)
  - Runners-up (2): 1993–94, 1996–97
  - Third place (3): 1994–95, 1995–96, 1997–98
- Pirveli Liga/Erovnuli Liga 2 (Tier 2)
  - Winners (1): 2023
  - Runners-up (2): 2009–10, 2013–14 (A Group)
- Liga 3 (Tier 3)
  - Runners-up (3): 2020, 2021, 2022

== Stadium ==
The Fazisi arena was built in 1961. Its reconstruction got under way in 2013, but it took seven years before the works were completed. Meanwhile, Kolkheti held their home games on Rugby Arena in Poti or in some neighbouring cities. Football returned to Fazisi in October 2019.

After promotion to the Erovnuli Liga in 2024, Kolkheti was the only team unable to hold domestic games at home due to its failure to meet UEFA requirements. Therefore, the club chose to use a recently built football ground in Kobuleti until the problem was fixed in late March 2025.
