= FC Botoșani in European football =

- Club: FC Botoșani
- First entry: 2015–16 UEFA Europa League
- Latest entry: 2020–21 UEFA Europa League

Fotbal Club Botoșani is a Romanian professional football club based in Botoșani, Botoșani County, northeastern Romania. The club has only participated in two seasons of the UEFA Europa League thus far, more specifically in 2015–16 and then once more rather recently in 2020–21 UEFA Europa League. During both seasons it failed to qualify to the group stage and only played until the second qualifying round.

== All-time statistics ==
As of 10 February 2021

Competition	S	P	W	D	L	GF	GA	GD
UEFA Europa League	2	6	2	1	3	6	8	−2
Total	2	6	2	1	3	6	8	−2

== Opponents ==
Country	Club	P	W	D	L	GF	GA	GD
(Georgia (country)) Georgia	Spartaki Tskhinvali	2	1	1	0	4	2	+2
Subtotal		2	1	1	0	4	2	+2
Kazakhstan	Ordabasy	1	1	0	0	2	1	+1
Subtotal		1	1	0	0	2	1	+1
North Macedonia	Shkëndija	1	0	0	1	0	1	–1
Subtotal		1	0	0	1	0	1	–1
Poland	Legia Warsaw	2	0	0	2	0	4	−4
Subtotal		2	0	0	2	0	4	−4
Total		6	2	1	3	6	8	−2

== Matches ==
Notes for the table below:

- 1Q: First qualifying round
- 2Q: Second qualifying round

Season	Competition	Round	Club	Home	Away	Aggregate
2015–16	UEFA Europa League	1Q	(Georgia (country)) Spartaki Tskhinvali	1–1	3–1	4–2
2015–16	UEFA Europa League	2Q	(Poland) Legia Warsaw	0–3	0–1	0–4
2020–21	UEFA Europa League	1Q	(Kazakhstan) Ordabasy	—N/a	2–1	—N/a
2020–21	UEFA Europa League	2Q	(North Macedonia) Shkëndija	0–1	—N/a	—N/a
