= 1996–97 Georgian Cup =

Tournament details
- Country: Georgia
- Teams: 52

Final positions
- Champions: Dinamo Tbilisi
- Runners-up: Dinamo Batumi

The 1996–97 Georgian Cup (also known as the David Kipiani Cup) was the fifty-third season overall and seventh since independence of the Georgian annual football tournament.

== First qualifying round ==
Team 1	Score	Team 2
Avaza Tbilisi	2–1	Zhineri
Shevardeni-2 Tbilisi	0–1	Mretebi Tbilisi
Kodako Tbilisi	1–0	SSS-Akademia Tbilisi
35-STU Tbilisi	5–0	Energetikosi Gardabani
Meshakre Tkibuli	5–1	Merani-91 Tbilisi
Kolkheti-2 Poti	1–0	Olimpia Khobi
Imereti Khoni	3–2	Salkhino Martvili
Odishi-2 Zugdidi	3–1	Skuri Tsalenjikha
Sapovnela Terjola	3–1	Mamisoni Oni
Duruji Kvareli	1–2	Chabukiani
Meskheti Akhaltsikhe	0–2	Tori Borjomi
Iberia Kareli	0–2	Tskhinvali
Locomotive Tbilisi	w/o	Algeti Marneuli

== Second qualifying round ==
Team 1	Score	Team 2
Chabukiani	0–1	Shiraki Dedoplistskaro
Tori Borjomi	0–1	Tskhinvali
Morkinali Tbilisi	3–1	Avaza Tbilisi
Dinamo-2 Tbilisi	3–1	Kodako Tbilisi
SKA Tbilisi	3–3 (4–3 p)	Mretebi Tbilisi
Armazi Mtskheta	1–0	35-STU Tbilisi
Magharoeli Chiatura	2–1	Sapovnela Terjola
Mertskhali Ozurgeti	2–3	Dinamo-2 Batumi
Sulori Vani	5–3	Egrisi Senaki
Odishi-2 Zugdidi	1–0	Kolkheti-2 Poti
Meshakhte Tkibuli	2–2 (2–3 p)	Imereti Khoni
Locomotive Tbilisi	w/o	Azoti Rustavi

== Round of 32 ==
Team 1	Agg.	Team 2	1st leg	2nd leg
Guria Lanchkhuti	12–3	Odishi-2 Zugdidi	7–1	5–2
Odishi Zugdidi	6–1	Dinamo-2 Batumi	5–1	1–0
Torpedo Kutaisi	3–2	Magharoeli Chiatura	3–2	0–0
Samtredia	2–0	Sulori Vani	1–0	1–0
Samgurali Tskaltubo	5–1	Imereti Khoni	1–0	4–1
Dila Gori	2–3	Dinamo-2 Tbilisi	2–1	0–2
Merani-91 Tbilisi	5–1	Shiraki Dedoplistskaro	4–0	1–1
Sioni Bolnisi	3–2	Armazi Mtskheta	2–0	1–2
Metalurgi Rustavi	5–4	Morkinali Tbilisi	2–1	3–3
Iveria Khashuri	2–1	Locomotive Tbilisi	0–0	2–1
Kakheti Telavi	3–6	SKA Tbilisi	2–2	1–4
Shevardeni-1906 Tbilisi	9–3	Tskhinvali	5–1	4–2

== Round of 16 ==
Team 1	Agg.	Team 2	1st leg	2nd leg
Dinamo Tbilisi	10–1	Dinamo-2 Tbilisi	5–0	5–1
Metalurgi Rustavi	0–4	Merani-91 Tbilisi	0–1	0–3
Iveria Khashuri	1–2	Shevardeni-1906 Tbilisi	0–0	1–2
Sioni Bolnisi	5–2	SKA Tbilisi	3–1	2–1
Samgurali Tskaltubo	1–7	Odishi Zugdidi	0–2	1–5
Dinamo Batumi	4–1	Torpedo Kutaisi	4–0	0–1
Samtredia	1–7	Kolkheti-1913 Poti	0–2	1–5
Guria Lanchkhuti	2–5	Margveti Zestaponi	1–2	1–3

== Quarterfinals ==
Team 1	Agg.	Team 2	1st leg	2nd leg
Sioni Bolnisi	0–8	Dinamo Tbilisi	0–6	0–2
Merani-91 Tbilisi	5–3	Shevardeni-1906 Tbilisi	1–1	4–2
Odishi Zugdidi	7–3	Margveti Zestaponi	6–1	1–2
Dinamo Batumi	3–1	Kolkheti-1913 Poti	3–1	0–0

== Semifinals ==
Team 1	Agg.	Team 2	1st leg	2nd leg
Dinamo Tbilisi	5–0	Merani-91 Tbilisi	2–0	3–0
Dinamo Batumi	6–1	Odishi Zugdidi	3–1	3–0

== Final ==
26 May 1997

Dinamo Tbilisi	1–0	Dinamo Batumi
Demetradze 31'

Boris Paichadze Stadium, Tbilisi
Attendance: 10,000
Referee: Sergo Kvaratskhelia (Zugdidi)

== See also ==
- 1996–97 Umaglesi Liga
- 1996–97 Pirveli Liga
