= 1993–94 Georgian Cup =

Tournament details
- Country: Georgia
- Teams: 43

Final positions
- Champions: Dinamo Tbilisi
- Runners-up: Metalurgi Rustavi

The 1993–94 Georgian Cup (also known as the David Kipiani Cup) was the fiftieth season overall and fourth since independence of the Georgian annual football tournament.

== First qualifying round ==
Team 1	Score	Team 2
Iberia Tbilisi	1–6	Tetri Artsivi
Duruji Kvareli	1–0	Merani-Bacho Tbilisi
Aragvi Dusheti	1–0	Krtsanisi-Zooveti Tbilisi
Meskheti Akhaltsikhe	4–1	Chabukiani
Meshakre Tkibuli	5–1	Merani-91 Tbilisi
Antsi Tbilisi	7–1	Armazi Mtskheta
Ulumbo Salkhino	1–1 (4–3 p)	Kiziki Tsnori
Giganti Laituri	0–3	Anako Ozurgeti
Egrisi Senaki	4–1	Armazi-90 Tbilisi
Kolkheti Abasha	w/o	Napareuli
Tskhinvali	w/o	Guria-2 Lanchkhuti

== Second qualifying round ==
Team 1	Score	Team 2
Ulumbo Salkhino	1–4	Aragvi Dusheti
Antsi Tbilisi	7–0	Tskhinvali
Anako Ozurgeti	0–1	Duruji Kvareli

== Round of 32 ==
Team 1	Agg.	Team 2	1st leg	2nd leg
Iveria Khashuri	8–1	Alazani Gurjaani	3–0	5–1
Sapovnela Terjola	2–4	Guria Lanchkhuti	1–2	1–2
Egrisi Senaki	3–5	Duruji Kvareli	3–1	0–4
Samtredia	4–1	Torpedo Kutaisi	1–0	3–1
Mretebi Tbilisi	w/o	Batumi	0–1	–
Samgurali Tskaltubo	6–5	Odishi Zugdidi	3–4	3–1
Meshakre Tkibuli	3–4	Magharoeli Chiatura	2–0	1–4
Shukura Kobuleti	4–6	Shevardeni-1906 Tbilisi	4–0	0–6
Meskheti Akhaltsikhe	3–4	Dila Gori	2–0	1–4
Kolkheti-1913 Poti	6–2	Kakheti Telavi	4–1	2–1
Kolkheti Abasha	0–3	Aragvi Dusheti	0–0	0–3
Antsi Tbilisi	0–1	Tetri Artsivi Tbilisi	0–0	0–1

== Round of 16 ==
Team 1	Agg.	Team 2	1st leg	2nd leg
Iveria Khashuri	5–6	Metalurgi Rustavi	4–2	1–4
Duruji Kvareli	2–4	Guria Lanchkhuti	1–0	1–4
Batumi	4–2	Samtredia	4–1	0–1
Aragvi Dusheti	2–6	Samgurali Tskaltubo	0–1	2–5
Magharoeli Chiatura	2–5	Shevardeni-1906 Tbilisi	0–0	2–5
Dila Gori	1–7	Kolkheti-1913 Poti	1–1	0–6

== Quarterfinals ==
Team 1	Agg.	Team 2	1st leg	2nd leg
Metalurgi Rustavi	6–3	Tetri Artsivi Tbilisi	4–2	2–1
Guria Lanchkhuti	2–4	Batumi	2–0	0–4
Dinamo Tbilisi	12–3	Samgurali Tskaltubo	11–0	1–3
Shevardeni-1906 Tbilisi	2–2 (3–4 p)	Kolkheti-1913 Poti	1–1	1–1

== Semifinals ==
Team 1	Agg.	Team 2	1st leg	2nd leg
Batumi	1–2	Metalurgi Rustavi	1–0	0–2 (a.e.t.)
Kolkheti-1913 Poti	0–3	Dinamo Tbilisi	0–2	0–1

== Final ==
26 May 1994

Dinamo Tbilisi	1–0	Metalurgi Rustavi
Kavelashvili 57'

Boris Paichadze Stadium, Tbilisi
Attendance: 20,000
Referee: Tamaz Latsabidze (Surami)

== See also ==
- 1993–94 Umaglesi Liga
- 1993–94 Pirveli Liga
