= 2009–10 Georgian Cup =

Tournament details
- Country: Georgia
- Teams: 28

Final positions
- Champions: WIT Georgia
- Runners-up: Dinamo Tbilisi
- UEFA Europa League: WIT Georgia

The 2009–10 Georgian Cup (also known as the David Kipiani Cup) was the 66th season overall and twentieth since independence of the Georgian annual football tournament. The competition began on 25 August 2009 and ended with the Final on 26 May 2010. The defending champions were Dinamo Tbilisi.

== Round of 32 ==
These matches were played on 25 and 26 August and 16 September 2009.

Team 1	Score	Team 2
Kolkheti Khobi	0–2	Merani Martvili
Dinamo Batumi	1–2	Chikhura Sachkere
Imereti Khoni	2–3 (a.e.t.)	Kolkheti-1913 Poti
35th F.S. Tbilisi	2–1	Meskheti Akhaltsikhe
Norchi Dinamo	0–1	Sioni Bolnisi
International Black Sea University	0–2	Spartaki Tskhinvali
Hereti Lagodekhi	1–2	Lokcomotive Tbilisi
Adeli Batumi	1–3	Torpedo Kutaisi
Guria Lanchkhuti	1–3	Baia Zugdidi
Ozurgeti	2–1	Magharoeli Chiatura
Meshakhte Tkibuli	0–2	Samtredia
Aragvi Dusheti	1–2 (a.e.t.)	Gagra

== Round of 16 ==
In this round entered 12 winners from the previous round as well as four teams that finished first, second, third and fourth in last year's Umaglesi Liga: WIT Georgia, Dinamo Tbilisi, Olimpi Rustavi and Zestaponi. The matches were played on 21 October 2009.

Team 1	Score	Team 2
Baia Zugdidi	3–0	Sioni Bolnisi
Chikhura Sachkere	1–0	Olimpi Rustavi
Torpedo Kutaisi	0–2	Zestaponi
35th F.S. Tbilisi	0–1	Dinamo Tbilisi
Kolkheti-1913 Poti	2–1 (a.e.t.)	Gagra
Ozurgeti	0–6	Spartaki Tskhinvali
Merani Martvili	2–0	Samtredia
Locomotive Tbilisi	1–3	WIT Georgia

== Quarterfinals ==
The eight winners from the previous round play in this round. The first legs were played on 3 November 2009 and the second legs were played on 1 and 2 December 2009.

Team 1	Agg.	Team 2	1st leg	2nd leg
Merani Martvili	1–1 (a)	Kolkheti-1913 Poti	0–0	1–1
Zestaponi	3–4	WIT Georgia	3–0	0–4 (a.e.t.)
Baia Zugdidi	2–3	Spartaki Tskhinvali	1–1	1–2
Chikhura Sachkere	1–1 (a)	Dinamo Tbilisi	1–1	0–0

== Semifinals ==
The four winners from the previous round played in this round. The first legs were played on 23 March 2010 and the second legs were played on 14 April 2010.

Team 1	Agg.	Team 2	1st leg	2nd leg
Merani Martvili	1–2	WIT Georgia	1–0	0–2
Spartaki Tskhinvali	0–3	Dinamo Tbilisi	0–0	0–3

== Final ==
26 May 2010
17:45 UTC+4

Dinamo Tbilisi	0–1	WIT Georgia
		Datunaishvili 41'

Boris Paichadze Stadium, Tbilisi
Attendance: 12,000
Referee: Lasha Silagava (Tbilisi)

== See also ==
- 2009–10 Umaglesi Liga
- 2009–10 Pirveli Liga
