= Elguja Gugushvili =

Georgian footballer and manager

Personal information
- Date of birth: 14 April 1946 (age 80)
- Place of birth: Georgian SSR, Soviet Union
- Height: 1.80 m (5 ft 11 in)
- Position: Goalkeeper

Senior career*
Years	Team	Apps	(Gls)
1968—1969	Sinatle		

Managerial career
- 199?: Georgia (U21)
- 1996—1997: Turkmenistan
- 1997—1998: FC WIT Georgia
- 2004: PAS Giannina (coach)
- 2011-2012: FC Zooveti
- 2012-2014: FC Algeti Marneuli
- * Club domestic league appearances and goals

Elguja Gugushvili (Georgian: ელგუჯა გუგუშვილი) also knowns as Jemal Gugushvili (born 14 April 1946) is a Georgian football manager and former player who played as a goalkeeper.

As a player, he is known for his performances for the FC Sinatle. In the early 1990s, he headed the Georgian U21 youth football team. In 1996–97 he headed the national team of Turkmenistan. The next two years he headed the Georgian FC WIT Georgia. He also worked in the coaching staffs of various Georgian clubs.
