= 2009–10 Umaglesi Liga =

Umaglesi Liga
- Season: 2009–10
- Dates: 1 August 2009 – 20 May 2010
- Champions: Olimpi Rustavi; 2nd Georgian title
- Relegated: Locomotive Tbilisi; Gagra
- Champions League: Olimpi Rustavi
- Europa League: Dinamo Tbilisi; Zestaponi; WIT Georgia
- Matches: 180
- Goals: 429 (2.38 per match)
- Top goalscorer: Anderson Aquino (26)
- Biggest home win: Dinamo Tbilisi 5–0 Spartaki-Tskhinvali; Olimpi 5–0 Samtredia; Olimpi 5–0 Gagra
- Biggest away win: Sioni 0–6 Olimpi; Baia 0–6 Dinamo Tbilisi
- Highest scoring: Samtredia 4–3 Gagra

The 2009–10 Umaglesi Liga was the 21st season of top-tier football in Georgia. It began on August 1, 2009, and ended on May 20, 2010. FC Olimpi Rustavi won the championship.

== Changes from 2008–09 ==
=== Structural changes ===
League size was reduced from 11 to 10 teams prior to this season.

=== Promotion and relegation ===
Borjomi were relegated to Pirveli Liga at the end of the season after finishing in 11th and last place. Other teams which will not participate in this year's championship are Mglebi and Meshketi, both for unknown reasons. This means that originally relegated teams Gagra and Spartaki Tskhinvali will stay another season in Umaglesi Liga.

Promoted to Georgia's top football division were Pirveli Liga 2008–09 Western group champions Samtredia and runners-up Baia. Western group champions Ameri were not promoted for unknown reasons.

== Team overview ==
FC Gagra and Spartaki Tskhinvali play their home matches in Tbilisi due to various inner-Georgian conflicts.

Location of teams in 2009–10 Umaglesi Liga

Team	Location	Venue	Capacity
FC Baia	Zugdidi	Gulia Tutberidze Stadium	5,000
FC Dinamo	Tbilisi	Boris Paichadze Stadium	54,549
FC Gagra	Tbilisi	Ameri Stadium	1,000
FC Locomotive	Tbilisi	Mikheil Meskhi Stadium	27,223
FC Olimpi	Rustavi	Poladi Stadium	7,300
FC Samtredia	Samtredia	Erosi Manjgaladze Stadium	15,000
FC Sioni	Bolnisi	Tamaz Stephania Stadium	3,000
FC Spartaki Tskhinvali	Tbilisi	Tengiz Burjanadze Stadium	7,980
FC WIT Georgia	Tbilisi	Shevardeni Stadium	4,000
FC Zestaponi	Zestaponi	David Abashidze Stadium	4,100

== League table ==
Pos	Team	Pld	W	D	L	GF	GA	GD	Pts	Qualification or relegation
1	Olimpi Rustavi (Note: Olimpi were docked 3 points due to the incidents that happened in the match against Zestaponi.) (C)	36	25	7	4	69	26	+43	79	Qualification for the Champions League second qualifying round
2	Dinamo Tbilisi	36	22	8	6	62	19	+43	74	Qualification for the Europa League first qualifying round
3	Zestaponi	36	19	10	7	58	33	+25	67	Qualification for the Europa League first qualifying round
4	WIT Georgia	36	17	13	6	48	31	+17	64	Qualification for the Europa League second qualifying round (Note: by winning the 2009–10 Georgian Cup)
5	Spartaki Tskhinvali	36	11	10	15	44	58	−14	43	
6	Sioni Bolnisi	36	8	14	14	27	43	−16	38	
7	Samtredia	36	10	7	19	43	68	−25	37	
8	Baia Zugdidi	36	7	11	18	29	48	−19	32	
9	Locomotive Tbilisi (R)	36	5	11	20	19	50	−31	26	Relegation to Pirveli Liga
10	Gagra (R)	36	5	9	22	30	59	−29	24	Relegation to Pirveli Liga

Source: Soccerway
Rules for classification: 1) points; 2) goal difference; 3) number of goals scored.
(C) Champions; (R) Relegated

== Results ==
The ten teams will play each other four times in this league for a total of 36 matches per team. In the first half of the season each team played every other team twice (home and away) and then do the same in the second half of the season.

=== First half of season ===
Home \ Away	BAI	DIN	GAG	LOC	OLI	SAM	SIO	SPA	WIT	ZES
Baia Zugdidi		0–6	2–2	2–1	1–2	2–2	2–0	4–1	0–1	0–1
Dinamo Tbilisi	1–0		2–0	1–0	4–0	2–0	0–2	5–0	0–0	2–0
Gagra	1–0	0–0		2–0	0–1	1–1	1–1	1–2	4–0	0–1
Locomotive Tbilisi	0–0	0–3	1–0		1–2	0–3	0–0	0–0	1–3	0–1
Olimpi Rustavi	2–0	1–0	5–0	3–1		5–0	3–0	1–1	0–0	1–0
Samtredia	1–0	3–1	4–3	2–0	0–4		1–1	2–1	2–2	0–2
Sioni Bolnisi	1–0	0–0	1–1	0–0	0–6	3–0		1–4	0–1	0–0
Spartaki Tskhinvali	1–0	1–1	3–1	2–0	1–2	2–0	1–1		1–2	3–3
WIT Georgia	2–1	0–0	5–1	1–1	1–2	2–1	2–1	2–0		1–1
Zestaponi	2–1	4–1	1–0	0–0	2–2	4–2	3–0	4–1	2–1	

Source: Soccerway
Legend: Blue = home team win; Yellow = draw; Red = away team win.

=== Second half of season ===
Home \ Away	BAI	DIN	GAG	LOC	OLI	SAM	SIO	SPA	WIT	ZES
Baia Zugdidi		1–1	2–1	0–0	1–1	2–0	0–0	0–2	1–1	0–1
Dinamo Tbilisi	3–0		4–1	1–0	0–0	4–1	4–0	2–0	1–2	2–0
Gagra	1–1	0–1		0–1	0–2	2–1	1–2	4–1	0–1	0–0
Locomotive Tbilisi	1–3	0–3	1–1		0–2	3–2	0–1	2–1	0–1	1–1
Olimpi Rustavi	1–0	1–1	3–0	2–0		3–1	0–0	4–0	1–0	3–1
Samtredia	0–1	0–1	1–0	1–2	0–1		2–1	2–1	1–0	2–3
Sioni Bolnisi	0–0	0–1	2–0	1–0	1–2	2–2		0–1	2–2	0–1
Spartaki Tskhinvali	2–0	2–1	0–0	1–1	4–1	1–1	1–3		0–0	1–4
WIT Georgia	2–2	0–2	2–0	3–0	2–0	1–1	0–0	3–1		1–1
Zestaponi	4–0	0–1	4–1	1–1	– (Note: The match between Zestaponi and Olimpi was abandoned in the 89th minute with the score level at 1–1 due to a pitch invasion by both teams' fans which escalated into a brawl. The match result was cancelled and both teams were awarded a 0–3 loss.)	5–1	1–0	0–0	0–1	

Source: Soccerway
Legend: Blue = home team win; Yellow = draw; Red = away team win.

== Top goalscorers ==
Including matches played in December 2009

Rank	Goalscorer	Team	Goals
1	(Brazil) Anderson Aquino	Olimpi Rustavi	26
2	(Georgia (country)) Nikoloz Gelashvili	Zestaponi	16
3	(Georgia (country)) Jaba Dvali	Zestaponi	12
3	(Georgia (country)) Vakhtang Kvaratskhelia	WIT Georgia	12
5	(Georgia (country)) Zaur Khachiperadze	Samtredia	11
5	(Gabon) Georges Akieremy	Dinamo Tbilisi	11

== See also ==
- 2009–10 Pirveli Liga
- 2009–10 Georgian Cup
