= FC Gagra =

Gagra
- Full name: Football Club Gagra
- Founded: 2004; 22 years ago
- Ground: David Petriashvili Arena, Tbilisi, Georgia
- Capacity: 2,500
- President: Besik Chikhradze
- Manager: Vladimer Khachidze
- League: Erovnuli Liga
- 2025: 5th of 10
Home colours	Away colours

FC Gagra (Georgian: საფეხბურთო კლუბი გაგრა) is a Georgian professional football club which competes in the Erovnuli Liga, the first tier of Georgian football.

The club has its origins in Gagra, Abkhazia. It was founded in Tbilisi by former player and coach Goderdzi Chikhradze and his cousin in 2004 with a plan to move the club to Gagra in the end, but due to the ongoing Abkhazia conflict the team plays its home games in Tbilisi.

FC Gagra is the only non-top flight Georgian team which has twice won the national cup.

== History ==
=== First years, 2004–2010 ===
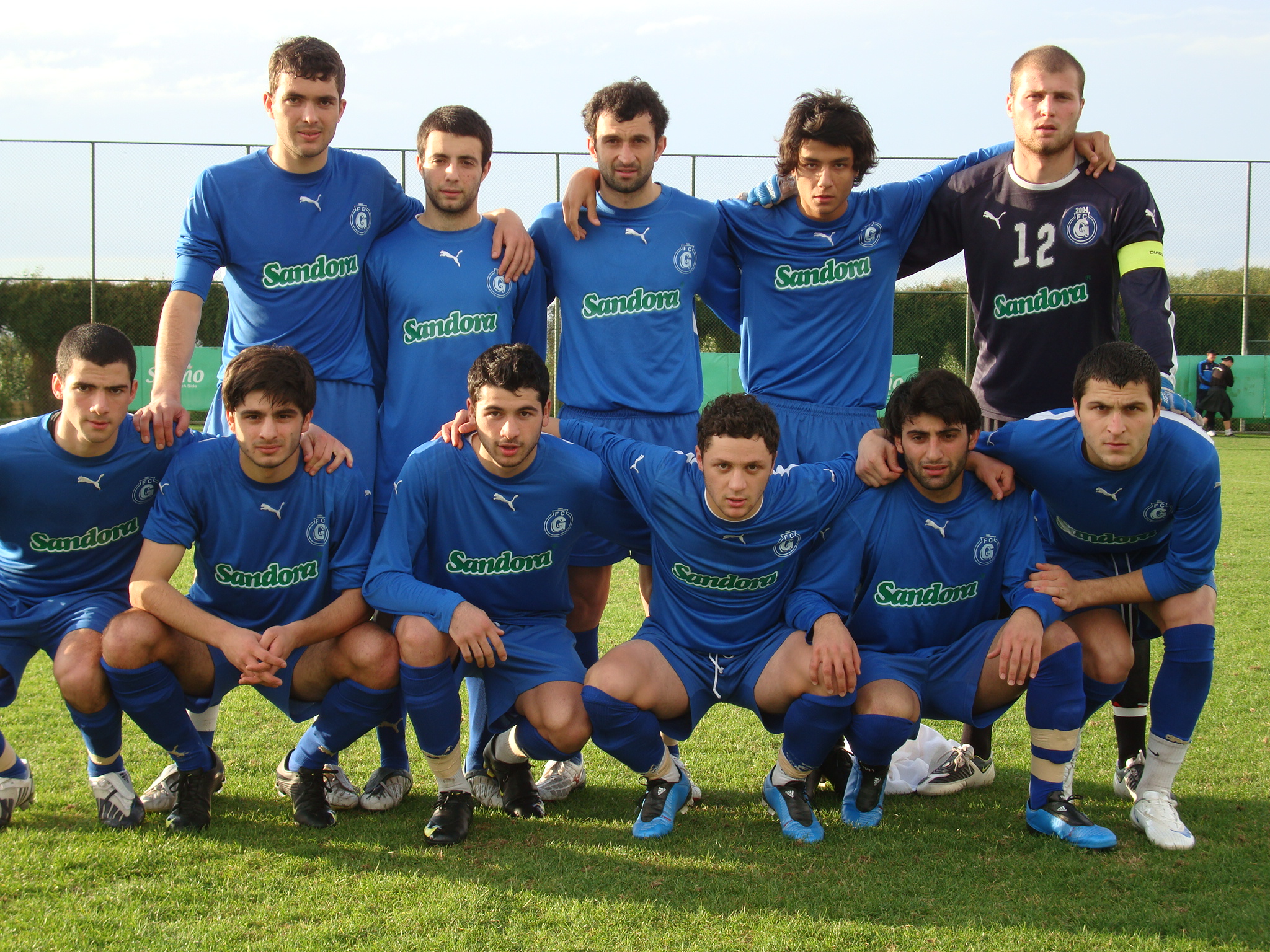
Gagra players in 2010

The new club was formed as FC Gagra in 2004 in Regionuli Liga, where they won promotion to Pirveli Liga. After winning their second-tier division, Gagra lost the promotion play-off in 2005–06 and 2006–07. In 2007–08, they again lost the promotion play-off, but after some withdrawals in the Umaglesi Liga the team was finally promoted. In the 2008–09 season, the team played in the top league, but were to be relegated in the end. Gagra avoided relegation only after higher placed teams withdrew from the league.

=== Prolific decade, 2011–21 ===
Gagra won the 2010–11 Pirveli Liga season, and became the winner of the Georgian Cup by defeating three-time winners Torpedo Kutaisi 1–0 after extra time.

In every season since their relegation to Liga 2 in 2012, Gagra were considered tough rivals aiming at the first division with 5th place being the worst final position. Overall, the club took part in Erovnuli Liga playoffs six times in sixteen years, although failed to overcome their opponents until 2021 when they beat Shukura and returned to the top flight after a ten-year absence.

Gagra's performance in the David Kipiani Cup was successful. As a second-division team, they reached the final in 2018 for the second time only to lose in penalty shootout. Two years later, though, they knocked out five clubs, including some of those regarded as contenders for the title, and won the cup without conceding a single goal in 630 minutes.

As a three-time finalist and two-time winner of the Cup final within these 10 years, Gagra achieved one of the best results among Georgian clubs.

=== Among the strongest, since 2022 ===
Тhe 2023 season was noteworthy for Gagra. First, they achieved their best results in the top division and for the first time sealed their league place for a third successive year. Besides, forward Zurab Museliani, who netted 17 goals, finished among the three top scorers of the season. Gagra's junior team also shined. Although they made a debut in the fifth division, the team won the title race and gained automatic promotion to Liga 4.

Two years later, Gagra improved their all-time highest league position by finishing in top half of the table.

== Records and statistics ==
=== League and cup history ===
Season	League									Georgian Cup	Europe	Top goalscorer	
Season	Div.	Pos.	Pl.	W	D	L	GS	GA	P	Georgian Cup	Europe	Name	League
2005/06	2nd	3 (Note: Beaten by Tskhinvali 2–1 after extra time in promotion play-offs)	34	19	11	4	49	22	68	Round of 16	-		
2006/07	2nd	3 (Note: Lost to Chikhura 2–1 after extra time in promotion play-offs)	34	18	6	10	52	36	60	First round	-		
2007/08	2nd East	1↑ (Note: Beaten by Spartaki Tskhinvali 1–0 in promotion play-offs)	27	16	6	5	59	36	54	First round	-		
2008/09	1st	9	30	7	7	16	23	48	28	Round of 32	-		
2009/10	1st	10↓	36	5	9	22	30	59	24	Round of 16	-	Giorgi Gabedava	10
2010/11	2nd	1↑	32	23	6	3	73	19	75	Winners	-		
2011/12	1st	10↓	36	9	7	20	35	53	34	Semi-final	EL - 2Q	Levan Sharikadze	5
2012/13	2nd	4	33	16	5	12	63	46	53	Round of 16	-	John Jeremiah	20
2013/14	2nd	4	24	11	9	4	44	25	42	First round	-	Gogita Gogatishvili	10
2014/15	2nd	3	35	15	5	15	59	44	50	First round	-	Nika Tsotskhalashvili	8
2015/16	2nd	5	34	16	4	14	54	38	52	-	-	Nika Magrakvelidze	13
2016	2nd	2	16	9	4	3	29	21	28	First round	-	Levan Papava	13
2017	2nd	5	36	16	5	15	46	38	53	Fifth round	-	Nikoloz Khintibidze	15
2018	2nd	3 (Note: Lost to Sioni 4–0 on aggregate in promotion play-offs)	36	16	10	10	50	41	58	Runners-Up	-	Rati Tsatskrialashvili	16
2019	2nd	5	36	13	8	15	46	42	47	Round of 16	-	Zviad Metreveli	5
2020	2nd	3 (Note: Lost to Torpedo 3–1 on aggregate in promotion play-offs)	18	7	8	3	24	10	29	Winners	-	Giorgi Ivaniadze	5
2021	2nd	2↑ (Note: Defeated Shukura 1–0 on aggregate in promotion play-offs)	36	22	9	5	74	27	75	Round of 8	CL 1Q	Tamaz Makatsaria	23
2022	1st	9 (Note: Beat Spaeri on penalties in relegation play-offs)	36	9	9	18	36	57	36	Round of 32		Tamaz Makatsaria, Teimuraz Shonia	6
2023	1st	7	36	10	8	18	47	65	38	Round of 32		Zurab Museliani	17
2024	1st	8 (Note: Beat Sioni on penalties in relegation playoffs)	36	11	5	20	36	53	38	Semifinals		Giorgi Kharebashvili	11
2025	1st	5	36	12	7	17	44	55	43	3rd round		Giorgi Kharebashvili	7

=== European history ===
As the winners of the 2010/11 Cup competition, Gagra took part in UEFA Europa League second qualifying round against the high-flying Anorthosis Famagusta. Widely regarded as favorites of the tie, the Cypriot side had a clear advantage in Larnaca, which resulted in 3–0 victory, but Gagra fought back in the second leg held in Zestaponi. They scored an early goal, shortly afterwards increased the lead, although eventually failed to equalize the aggregate score.

As of match played 15 July 2021

Competition	Pld	W	D	L	GF	GA
UEFA Europa League	2	1	0	1	2	3
UEFA Europa Conference League	2	0	1	1	1	2
Total	4	1	1	2	3	5

Season	Competition	Round	Club	Home	Away	Aggregate
2011–12	UEFA Europa League	2nd qualifying round	(Cyprus) Anorthosis Famagusta	2–0	0–3	2–3
2021–22	UEFA Europa Conference League	1st qualifying round	(Montenegro) Sutjeska Nikšić	1–1	0–1	1–2

== Current squad ==
As of 29 July, 2026

Note: Flags indicate national team as defined under FIFA eligibility rules; some limited exceptions apply. Players may hold more than one non-FIFA nationality.

No.	Pos.	Nation	Player
1	GK	UKR	Oleksandr Vorobey
2	DF	BRA	Augusto
3	DF	GEO	Otar Chochia
4	DF	BIH	Vladimir Arsić
6	MF	GEO	Mate Tsintsadze
7	MF	BRA	Pedro Borges
8	MF	UKR	Illya Skrypnyk
9	FW	GEO	Davit Mujiri
10	MF	GEO	Luka Kekelidze
11	FW	GEO	Saba Zoidze
12	GK	GEO	Gela Barbakadze
13	MF	GEO	Luka Gobejishvili
14	DF	GEO	Zurab Chavchanidze

No.	Pos.	Nation	Player
17	MF	BRA	Vinicius Cezar
18	MF	UKR	Viktor Bliznichenko
20	FW	GEO	Giorgi Darsania
21	MF	GEO	Aleksandre Peikrishvili (on loan from Dynamo Kyiv)
22	DF	GEO	Gela Sadghobelashvili
23	MF	UKR	Andriy Andreychuk
25	DF	BRA	Wanderson
26	DF	GEO	Mikheil Kobalia
29	MF	GHA	Richmond Adeyeye
30	MF	GEO	Giorgi Goshteliani
33	MF	GEO	Luka Gurchiani
35	GK	RUS	Aleksandr Timchenko
39	MF	BRA	Rafael
40	DF	BRA	Claudinei

== Club officials ==
=== Personnel ===
Position	Staff
Head coach	Vladimer Khachidze
Assistant head coach	Giorgi Tkeshelashvili
Assistant head coach	Zviad Metreveli
Goalkeeping coach	Irakli Shengelia
Fitness coach	Khvicha Khorava

=== Club executives ===
Office	Name
President	Besik Chikhradze
Executive chairman	Victoria Durglishvili
Technical Director	Davit Gelashvili

== Shirt sponsors and manufacturers ==
Period	Kit manufacturer	Shirt partner
2010–	PUMA	Sandora

== Honours ==
- Erovnuli Liga 2
  - Winners (2): 2007–08, 2010–11
  - Runners-up (2): 2016, 2021
  - Third place (5): 2005–06, 2006–07, 2014–15, 2018, 2020
- Georgian Cup
  - Winners (2): 2010–11, 2020

== Managers ==
- (Georgia (country)) Kakhi Karanadze (2004–2009)
- (Ukraine) Viktor Kashchey (2009)
- (Georgia (country)) Vladimer Khachidze (2009–2010)
- (Ukraine) Anatoliy Piskovets (2010–2011)
- (Georgia (country)) Varlam Kilasonia (2011)
- (Georgia (country)) Zviad Jeladze (2011–2012)
- (Georgia (country)) Tengiz Sichinava (2014)
- (Ukraine) Anatoliy Piskovets (2015–2017)
- (Ukraine) Denys Khomutov (2017–2018)
- (Georgia (country)) Gaga Kirkitadze (2019–2023)
- (Georgia (country)) Giorgi Oniani (2023–2024)
- (Georgia (country)) Vladimer Khachidze (2024-2025)
- (Serbia) Željko Ljubenović (2025–2026)

== Notable players ==
Georgian national team member Tornike Okriashvili started his career as a professional player in this club in 2009–10, before moving to Shakhtar Donetsk on loan.
