= Georgian Cup =

- Founded: 1990
- Region: Georgia
- Teams: 26
- Qualifier for: UEFA Europa Conference League
- Current champions: Dila Gori (2nd title)
- Most championships: Dinamo Tbilisi (13 titles)
- Website: Georgian Cup
- 2026 Georgian Cup

The Georgian Cup (Georgian: საქართველოს თასი) is the main annual association football knockout cup competition in Georgia. It is organized by the Georgian Football Federation (GFF) and is open to clubs of all divisions. The tournament was established in 1990 alongside the formation of the independent Georgian national league, and since 1993 has been officially named the David Kipiani Cup in honor of the famous Georgian footballer David Kipiani.

The winner qualifies for the UEFA Europa Conference League and also competes in the Georgian Super Cup against the national league champion.

== Winners and finals ==
=== Soviet era cup winners ===
Previous winners are:

- 1944: Team of Sokhumi
- 1945: Dinamo Sokhumi
- 1946: Burevestnik Tbilisi
- 1947: Dinamo Batumi
- 1948: Dinamo Sokhumi
- 1949: Factory of Dimitrov
- 1950: TODO Tbilisi
- 1951: TTU Tbilisi
- 1952: TTU Tbilisi
- 1953: Dinamo Kutaisi
- 1954: TTU Tbilisi
- 1955: Dinamo Kutaisi
- 1956: Lokomotiv Tbilisi
- 1957: TTU Tbilisi
- 1958: Dinamo Batumi
- 1959: Kolmeurne Makharadze
- 1960: Kolmeurne Makharadze
- 1961: SKIF Tbilisi
- 1962: Metallurg Zestaponi
- 1963: Imereti Kutaisi
- 1964: Meshakhte Tkibuli
- 1965: Guria Lanchkhuti
- 1966: Guria Lanchkhuti
- 1967: Sinatle Tbilisi
- 1968: Sinatle Tbilisi
- 1969: Sinatle Tbilisi
- 1970: Egrisi Tskhakaya
- 1971: Guria Lanchkhuti
- 1972: Kakheti Telavi
- 1973: Dinamo Zugdidi
- 1974: Metallurg Rustavi
- 1975: SKIF Tbilisi
- 1976: Meshakhte Tkibuli
- 1977: Nadikvari Telavi
- 1978: Magaroeli Chiatura
- 1979: Magaroeli Chiatura
- 1980: Sulori Vani
- 1981: Sulori Vani
- 1982: Mertskhali Makharadze
- 1983: Tbilisskij Zooveterinarnyj Institut
- 1984: Dinamo Zugdidi
- 1985: Imedi Tbilisi
- 1986: Madneuli Bolnisi
- 1987: Spartak Tskhinvali
- 1988: Shadrevani 83 Tskaltubo
- 1989: Shadrevani 83 Tskaltubo

=== Cup finals since independence ===
	Match went to extra time
	Match decided by a penalty shootout after extra time
**Bold**	Winning team won **The Double**
Italic	Team from outside the top flight

Season	Winners	Score	Runners–up	Venue
1990	Guria Lanchkhuti (1)	1–0 (a.e.t.)	Tskhumi Sokhumi	Boris Paichadze Stadium, Tbilisi
1991–92	**Iberia-Dinamo Tbilisi** (1)	3–1	Tskhumi Sokhumi	Boris Paichadze Stadium, Tbilisi
1992–93	**Dinamo Tbilisi** (2)	4–2	Dinamo Batumi	Boris Paichadze Stadium, Tbilisi
1993–94	**Dinamo Tbilisi** (3)	1–0	Metalurgi Rustavi	Boris Paichadze Stadium, Tbilisi
1994–95	**Dinamo Tbilisi** (4)	1–0	Dinamo Batumi	Boris Paichadze Stadium, Tbilisi
1995–96	**Dinamo Tbilisi** (5)	1–0 (a.e.t.)	Dinamo Batumi	Boris Paichadze Stadium, Tbilisi
1996–97	**Dinamo Tbilisi** (6)	1–0	Dinamo Batumi	Boris Paichadze Stadium, Tbilisi
1997–98	Dinamo Batumi (1)	2–1 (a.e.t.)	Dinamo Tbilisi	Boris Paichadze Stadium, Tbilisi
1998–99	Torpedo Kutaisi (1)	0–0 (a.e.t.) (4–2 pen.)	Samgurali Tskaltubo	Boris Paichadze Stadium, Tbilisi
1999–2000	Locomotive Tbilisi (1)	0–0 (a.e.t.) (4–2 pen.)	Torpedo Kutaisi	Boris Paichadze Stadium, Tbilisi
2000–01	**Torpedo Kutaisi** (2)	0–0 (a.e.t.) (4–3 pen.)	Locomotive Tbilisi	Boris Paichadze Stadium, Tbilisi
2001–02	Locomotive Tbilisi (2)	2–0	Torpedo Kutaisi	Boris Paichadze Stadium, Tbilisi
2002–03	**Dinamo Tbilisi** (7)	3–1	Sioni Bolnisi	Mikheil Meskhi Stadium, Tbilisi
2003–04	Dinamo Tbilisi (8)	2–1	Torpedo Kutaisi	Mikheil Meskhi Stadium, Tbilisi
2004–05	Locomotive Tbilisi (3)	2–0	Zestaponi	Boris Paichadze Stadium, Tbilisi
2005–06	Ameri Tbilisi (1)	2–2 (a.e.t.) (4–3 pen.)	Zestaponi	Mikheil Meskhi Stadium, Tbilisi
2006–07	Ameri Tbilisi (2)	1–0	Zestaponi	Boris Paichadze Stadium, Tbilisi
2007–08	Zestaponi (1)	2–1	Ameri Tbilisi	Boris Paichadze Stadium, Tbilisi
2008–09	Dinamo Tbilisi (9)	1–1 (a.e.t.) (2–0 pen.)	Olimpi Rustavi	Mikheil Meskhi Stadium, Tbilisi
2009–10	WIT Georgia (1)	1–0	Dinamo Tbilisi	Boris Paichadze Stadium, Tbilisi
2010–11	Gagra (1)	1–0 (a.e.t.)	Torpedo Kutaisi	Boris Paichadze Stadium, Tbilisi
2011–12	Dila Gori (1)	4–1	Zestaponi	Mikheil Meskhi Stadium, Tbilisi
2012–13	**Dinamo Tbilisi** (10)	3–1	Chikhura Sachkhere	Mikheil Meskhi Stadium, Tbilisi
2013–14	**Dinamo Tbilisi** (11)	2–1	Chikhura Sachkhere	Mikheil Meskhi Stadium, Tbilisi
2014–15	Dinamo Tbilisi (12)	5–0	Samtredia	Mikheil Meskhi Stadium, Tbilisi
2015–16	**Dinamo Tbilisi** (13)	1–0	Sioni Bolnisi	Ramaz Shengelia Stadium, Kutaisi
2016	Torpedo Kutaisi (3)	2–1	Merani Martvili	David Abashidze Stadium, Zestaponi
2017	Chikhura Sachkhere (1)	0–0 (a.e.t.) (4–3 pen.)	Torpedo Kutaisi	Tengiz Burjanadze Stadium, Gori
2018	Torpedo Kutaisi (4)	2–2 (a.e.t.) (4–2 pen.)	Gagra	Angisa Stadium, Batumi
2019	Saburtalo Tbilisi (1)	3–1	Locomotive Tbilisi	Tengiz Burjanadze Stadium, Gori
2020	Gagra (2)	0–0 (a.e.t.) (5–3 pen.)	Samgurali Tskaltubo	Tengiz Burjanadze Stadium, Gori
2021	Saburtalo Tbilisi (2)	1–0	Samgurali Tskaltubo	Ramaz Shengelia Stadium, Kutaisi
2022	Torpedo Kutaisi (5)	2–0	Locomotive Tbilisi II	Adjarabet Arena, Batumi
2023	Saburtalo Tbilisi (3)	1–0	Dinamo Batumi	Mikheil Meskhi Stadium, Tbilisi
2024	Spaeri (1)	2–2 (a.e.t.) (5–4 pen.)	Dinamo Tbilisi	Mikheil Meskhi Stadium, Tbilisi
2025	Dila Gori (2)	3–1	Iberia 1999	Davit Petriashvili Stadium, Tbilisi

=== Performance by club ===
Club	Winners	Runners-up	Winning years	Runner-up years
Dinamo Tbilisi	13	3	1992, 1993, 1994, 1995, 1996, 1997, 2003, 2004, 2009, 2013, 2014, 2015, 2016 (spring)	1998, 2010, 2024
Torpedo Kutaisi	5	5	1999, 2001, 2016 (autumn), 2018, 2022	2000, 2002, 2004, 2011, 2017
Locomotive Tbilisi	3	2	2000, 2002, 2005	2001, 2019
Iberia 1999	3	1	2019, 2021, 2023	2025
Ameri Tbilisi	2	1	2006, 2007	2008
Gagra	2	1	2011, 2020	2018
Dila Gori	2	0	2012, 2025	
Dinamo Batumi	1	5	1998	1993, 1995, 1996, 1997, 2023
Zestaponi	1	4	2008	2005, 2006, 2007, 2012
Chikhura Sachkhere	1	2	2017	2013, 2014
Guria Lanchkhuti	1	0	1990	
WIT Georgia	1	0	2010	
Spaeri	1	0	2024	
Samgurali Tskaltubo	0	3		1999, 2020, 2021
Tskhumi Sokhumi	0	2		1990, 1992
Rustavi	0	2		1994, 2009
Sioni Bolnisi	0	2		2003, 2016 (spring)
Samtredia	0	1		2015
Merani Martvili	0	1		2016 (autumn)
Locomotive Tbilisi II	0	1		2022

== See also ==
- Football records and statistics in Georgia
