= Dinamo Zugdidi =

- Full name: FC Dinamo Zugdidi
- Founded: 1918; 108 years ago
- Dissolved: 2023; 3 years ago
- Ground: Central Stadium; Ganarjiis Mukhuri, Georgia
- Capacity: 2,000
Home colours	Away colours

FC Dinamo Zugdidi was a Georgian football club based in Zugdidi. In 2023, after being accused of match-fixing and expelled from the Erovnuli Liga 2 the previous season, the club took part in Liga 4 and stopped functioning following their relegation to Regionuli Liga.

== History ==
The club was founded in 1918 as Odishi Zugdidi.

In 1990, FC Odishi Zugdidi were promoted for the first time to the Umaglesi Liga, the top division of Georgian football. In the 1998–99 season they finished 15th and were relegated to the Pirveli Liga. Ahead of the 2001–02 season the club changed its name to FC Lazika Zugdidi and the following season the club won promotion back to the Umaglesi Liga.

Ahead of the 2003–04 season, FC Lazika Zugdidi merged with FC Spartaki Tbilisi, a Pirveli Liga club. During the winter break, FC Spartak-Lazika Zugdidi relocated to Tbilisi and renamed themselves to FC Spartaki Tbilisi. The fusion was later undone and the now independent club changed its name to FC Zugdidi.

In July 2006, FC Zugdidi and FC Mglebi Zugdidi, a Regionuli Liga club, merged. The club continued to perform in the Pirveli League but was renamed FC Mglebi Zugdidi. In the season 2006–07, they won the league and returned to the Umaglesi Liga.

They renamed themselves to FC Baia Zugdidi in 2009. Later, ahead of the 2012–13 season, FC Baia Zugdidi changed their name to FC Zugdidi. In 2016, when the last season of Umaglesi Liga was held before its rebranding as Erovnuli Liga, the club lost a relegation battle. A year later, Zugdidi dropped out of the 2nd division as well.

In January 2018, the Zugdidi City Council approved a deal between the city municipality and football manager Zaza Janashia, who purchased 100% share of the club at auction. Zugdidi managed to secure automatic promotion from Liga 3 after winning the league with a five-point margin. In December 2019, the club announced in a written statement that they would be renamed again as FC Dinamo Zugdidi.

In the 2022 season, they, alongside Shevardeni-1906, were accused of match fixing and expelled to Liga 4, the fourth division of Georgian football.

The team finished bottom of the table in 2023 before suspending their football activities.

== Name History ==
- 1918–??: Odishi Zugdidi (Georgian: ოდიში ზუგდიდი)
- 1964–65: Engurhesi Zugdidi
- 1965–73: Inguri Zugdidi
- 1974–90: Dinamo Zugdidi
- 1990–94: Odishi Zugdidi
- 1994–95: Dinamo Zugdidi
- 1995–96: Dinamo-Odishi Zugdidi
- 1996–99: Odishi Zugdidi
- 2000–01: Dinamo Zugdidi
- 2001–03: Lazika Zugdidi
- 2003: Spartak-Lazika Zugdidi
- 2004: Dinamo Zugdidi
- 2004–06: FC Zugdidi
- 2006–09: Mglebi Zugdidi
- 2009–12: Baia Zugdidi
- 2012–20: FC Zugdidi
- 2020–: Dinamo Zugdidi

== Seasons ==
=== As Odishi / Dinamo ===
Season	League	Pos.	Pl.	W	D	L	GF	GA	P	Cup	Notes	Manager
1998–99	Umaglesi Liga	15	30	6	2	22	21	70	20		Relegated	
1999-00	Pirveli Liga											
2000–01	Pirveli Liga										Relegated	
2001–02	Regionuli Liga West											
2002–03	Regionuli Liga West											
2003–04	Regionuli Liga West											
2004–05	Regionuli Liga West											
2005–06	Regionuli Liga West											
2006–07	Regionuli Liga West											

=== As Baia / Mglebi / FC Zugdidi ===
Season	League	Pos.	Pl.	W	D	L	GF	GA	Pts	Cup	Europe	Notes	Manager
2005–06	Pirveli Liga	12	34	12	7	15	24	33	43	Round of 32		FC Zugdidi	
2006–07	Pirveli Liga	1	34	24	4	6	58	24	76	1st Round		Mglebi Zugdidi	
2007–08	Umaglesi Liga	7	26	10	3	13	27	33	33	Round of 16		Mglebi Zugdidi	
2008–09	Umaglesi Liga	7	30	10	6	14	36	41	36	Round of 32		Mglebi Zugdidi	
2009–10	Umaglesi Liga	8	36	7	11	18	29	48	32	Quarter-finals		Baia Zugdidi	
2010–11	Umaglesi Liga	6	36	13	5	18	36	51	44	Round of 16		Baia Zugdidi	
2011–12	Umaglesi Liga	7	28	5	7	16	25	49	22	Quarter-finals		Baia Zugdidi	
2012–13	Umaglesi Liga	6	32	10	6	16	31	52	36	Round of 16		FC Zugdidi	

=== As Baia Zugdidi (reserves) ===
Season	League	Pos.	Pl.	W	D	L	GF	GA	P	Cup	Europe	Notes	Manager
2008–09	Pirveli Liga	2	30	19	6	5	58	20	63	Round of 16		Promoted	

== Honours ==
- Georgian Soviet Championship

Champion: 1964, 1973

- Georgian Soviet Cup

Champion: 1973, 1984

- Pirveli Liga

Champion: 2003, 2007
Silver Medal winner: 2009

== Current squad ==
As of August 2019

Note: Flags indicate national team as defined under FIFA eligibility rules; some limited exceptions apply. Players may hold more than one non-FIFA nationality.

No.	Pos.	Nation	Player
2	FW	RSA	Melkisedek Tsvale
3	DF	GEO	Saba Nadiradze
4	DF	NGR	Lukman Gilmori
5	DF	GEO	Papuna Mosemgvdlishvili
7	FW	GEO	Arvelod Khunjgurua
8	MF	GEO	Data Kiria
9	MF	GEO	Nukri Chkadua
10	MF	GEO	Luka Guguchia
11	MF	GEO	Archil Meskhi
13	MF	GEO	Irakli Klimiashvili
14	MF	GEO	Gigla Burkadze
15	DF	GEO	Mikheil Rukhaia

No.	Pos.	Nation	Player
17	DF	GEO	Boris Makharadze
19	MF	GEO	Irakli Bigvava
20	MF	GEO	Karlo Jikidze
21	MF	GEO	Saba Danelia
22	DF	GEO	Guram Mindorashvili
24	GK	GEO	Vakhtang Jomidava
27	MF	GEO	Giga Tsurtsumia
30	GK	GEO	Soso Kardava
31	DF	GEO	Tornike Jimsheleishvili
37	MF	RUS	Nikoloz Berishvili
40	MF	GEO	Bachana Chedia

== Managers ==
- (Germany) Herbert Zanker (Jul 1, 2008 – June 30, 2009)
- (Georgia (country)) Elguja Kometiani (Dec 17, 2009 – Dec 27, 2011)
- (Georgia (country)) Gocha Tkebuchava (Jan 6, 2012 – May 15, 2012)
- (Georgia (country)) Elguja Kometiani (May 15, 2012 – June 30, 2013)
- (Georgia (country)) Klimenti Tsitaishvili (Aug 1, 2013 – Nov 10, 2013)
- (Georgia (country)) Sergo Gabelaia (Nov 14–19, 2013)
- (Georgia (country)) Giorgi Daraselia (Nov 19, 2014 – June 1, 2014)
- (Georgia (country)) Nestor Mumladze (Aug 1, 2014 – Oct 20, 2014)
- (Georgia (country)) Besik Sherozia (Oct 21, 2014 – Nov 14, 2015)
- (Ukraine) Yuriy Bakalov (Jan 11, 2016 – Aug 2016)
- (Georgia (country)) Otar Gabelia (Aug 2016 – Aug 2016)
- (Ukraine) Volodymyr Lyutyi (since Aug 2016)

== Women's team ==
The women's team participated in the 2010–11 UEFA Women's Champions League qualifying round, where it lost all three matches.
