= FC Metalurgi Rustavi =

Georgian former association football team

- Founded: 1948; 78 years ago
- Dissolved: 2015
- Ground: Poladi Stadium; Rustavi, Georgia
- Capacity: 6,200
Home colours	Away colours

Metalurgi Rustavi was a Georgian football team based in Rustavi, which has twice won the national league.

In Soviet times, the club played under the name "Metalurgi" (Rustavi), then during the independence of Georgia, the club was called "Gorda" (Rustavi) and FC Rustavi.

After FC Tbilisi merged with club FC Rustavi in 2006, FC Olimpi Rustavi was established.

== History ==
Football in Rustavi could be traced back to Metalurgi Rustavi in the Soviet era.

In 1990, the club became a member of the newly created Umaglesi Liga under the name Gorda with Givi Nodia at the helm. In the first three seasons Gorda came third twice. Following Nodia's departure from the team, the management reversed its decision regarding the name. For the next six seasons Metalurgi did not achieve any significant success, although they signed several players who later joined the national team, namely Soso Grishikashvili, Zurab Menteshashvili, Aleksandre Rekhviashvili, and Levan Kobiashvili.

The club was renamed back to Gorda in 1998. Around this period the team usually stayed in the bottom half of the table. In 2002, Gorda lost playoffs to Mtskheta and suffered a first relegation to Pirveli Liga. A year later, being Rustavi this time, they prevailed over the same opponents in play-offs, but due to financial difficulties failed to obtain a top-flight license.

Before the 2006 season, it was announced that Rustavi would merge with Umaglesi Liga side Tbilisi and take part in the main division as Olimpi Rustavi. Starting from this year, Olimpi was regarded as one of the main title contenders.

In 2007, the team won their first Georgian Umaglesi Liga title, followed by the second title three years later. In the same season they recorded an unbeaten run consisting of 27 league matches. With 26 goals netted in 31 matches Anderson Aquino became their top scorer of this season. Having beaten WIT Georgia 2–0, Olimpi won the Super Cup as well.

For the 2011–12 season the club changed its name to Metalurgi Rustavi after a thirteen-year wait. Metalurgi finished on equal points as Zestaponi and was faced with a bizarre scandal involving the Football Federation. As these clubs differently inferred new league regulations determining a winner of the tournament, they both declared themselves a champion. Initially, the GFF sided with Metalurgi, although after an executive committee extraordinary meeting held the next day, it announced a final decision in favor of Zestaponi.

Despite some decline, experienced by Metalurgi in following years, their players occasionally still featured in different post-season nominations. In one of such events in December 2014, Otar Kiteishvili was voted among three best young players.

The 2014–15 season turned out critical. Despite sitting among the top five teams before the winter break, soon the overall situation rapidly deteriorated. The club had amassed debts exceeding 8₾ million and could not afford to pay salaries to its staff and players. After a fifteen-game winless run, Metalurgi ended up in the relegation zone. Following a 5–0 loss to Lokomotivi in playoffs, they were relegated.

Their last season was in the Meore Liga, the third division, in 2015–16, but midway through the season they withdrew from the league. Subsequently, Metalurgi were declared bankrupt. A new Rustavi club emerged representing the city in Liga 2, although they did not have any legal connections.

== Honours ==
- Erovnuli Liga
  - Winners (2): 2007, 2010
  - Runners-up (1): 2011–12
  - Third place (4): 1990, 1991–92, 2008–09, 2010–11
- Georgian Super Cup
  - Winners (1): 2010
- Georgian SSR Football Competition:
  - Winners (4): 1959, 1974, 1979, 1984

== Seasons ==
Champions	Runners-up	Third place	Promoted	Relegated

Season	League	Pos.	P	W	D	L	GF	GA	P	Cup	Europe
Gorda Rustavi
1990	Umaglesi Liga	3	34	22	3	9	63	33	69	Quarterfinals	Did not qualify
1991	Umaglesi Liga	9	19	7	5	7	34	22	26	—	Did not qualify
1991–92	Umaglesi Liga	3	38	22	9	7	71	38	75	Round of 32	Did not qualify
Metalurgi Rustavi
1992–93	Umaglesi Liga	7	32	14	7	11	73	69	49	Round of 32	Did not qualify
1993–94	Umaglesi Liga	9	20	5	1	14	32	46	16	Runner-up	Did not qualify
1994–95	Umaglesi Liga	7	30	12	8	10	48	37	44	Semifinals	Did not qualify
1995–96	Umaglesi Liga	5	30	22	0	8	70	36	66	Round of 16	Did not qualify
1996–97	Umaglesi Liga	10	30	11	2	17	44	57	35	Round of 16	Did not qualify
1997–98	Umaglesi Liga	11	30	10	4	16	32	41	34	Round of 32	Did not qualify
Gorda Rustavi
1998–99	Umaglesi Liga	12	30	7	11	12	28	46	32	Round of 16	Did not qualify
1999-00	Umaglesi Liga	12	28	13	3	12	42	28	34	Round of 16	Did not qualify
2000–01	Umaglesi Liga	11	32	8	11	13	32	42	26	Round of 16	Did not qualify
2001–02	Umaglesi Liga	10	32	8	8	16	27	47	25	Quarterfinals	Did not qualify
2002–03	Umaglesi Liga	10	32	9	4	19	30	48	25	Round of 32	Did not qualify
2003–04	Pirveli Liga	4	30	16	3	11	46	31	51	Round of 32	Did not qualify
FC Rustavi
2004–05	Pirveli Liga	11	30	10	7	13	39	43	37	Round of 32	Did not qualify
2005–06	Pirveli Liga	8	34	13	10	11	50	37	49	Round of 32	Did not qualify
FC Olimpi Rustavi
2006–07	Umaglesi Liga	1	26	19	6	1	57	9	63	Round of 16	Did not qualify
2007–08	Umaglesi Liga	4	26	16	4	6	26	16	52	Quarter finals	UEFA Champions League 1st qualifying round
2008–09	Umaglesi Liga	3	30	16	9	5	40	20	57	Runner-up	Did not qualify
2009–10	Umaglesi Liga	1	36	25	7	4	69	26	79	Round of 16	UEFA Europa League 2nd qualifying round
2010–11	Umaglesi Liga	3	36	20	6	10	52	31	66	Quarter finals	UEFA Champions League 2nd qualifying round
FC Metalurgi Rustavi
2011–12	Umaglesi Liga	2	28	17	4	7	39	28	55	Semi-finals	UEFA Europa League 3rd qualifying round
2012–13	Umaglesi Liga	7	32	12	8	12	29	35	44	Semi-finals	UEFA Europa League 2nd qualifying round
2013–14	Umaglesi Liga	5	32	13	6	13	35	39	45	Quarter finals	Did not qualify
2014–15	Umaglesi Liga	14	30	6	8	16	25	46	26	Quarter finals	Did not qualify
2015–16	Meore Liga								Withdrew		

== European record ==
Season	Competition	Round	Country	Club	Home	Away
2007–08	UEFA Champions League	1Q	(Kazakhstan)	FC Astana	0–0	0–3
2009–10	UEFA Europa League	1Q	(Faroe Islands)	B36 Tórshavn	2–0	2–0
2009–10	UEFA Europa League	2Q	(Poland)	Legia Warszawa	0–1	0–3
2010–11	UEFA Champions League	2Q	(Kazakhstan)	Aktobe	1–1	0–2
2011–12	UEFA Europa League	1Q	(Armenia)	Banants	1–1	1–0
2011–12	UEFA Europa League	2Q	(Kazakhstan)	Irtysh Pavlodar	1–1	2–0
2011–12	UEFA Europa League	3Q	(France)	Stade Rennais	2–5	0–2
2012–13	UEFA Europa League	1Q	(Albania)	Teuta	6–1	3–0
2012–13	UEFA Europa League	2Q	(Czech Republic)	Viktoria Plzeň	1–3	0–2

Notable Players

- (Georgia (country)) Shota Khinchagashvili
- (Georgia (country)) Kakhaber Tskhadadze
- (Georgia (country)) Levan Silagadze
- (Georgia (country)) Varlam Kilasonia
- (Georgia (country)) Giorgi Kilasonia
- (Georgia (country)) Levan Kobiashvili
- (Georgia (country)) Nugzar Lobzhanidze
- (Georgia (country)) Nikoloz Togonidze
- (Georgia (country)) Iason aladashvili
- (Georgia (country)) Giorgi Sichinava
- (Georgia (country)) Giorgi Gakhokidze
- (Georgia (country)) Gocha Jamarauli
- (Georgia (country)) Otar Kiteishvili
- (Georgia (country)) Vako Qazaishvili

== Managers ==
- (Georgia (country)) Giorgi Kiknadze (July 1, 2006 – Jan 1, 2007)
- (Ukraine) Anatoliy Piskovets (Sept 1, 2007 – Feb 1, 2008)
- (Georgia (country)) Khvicha Kasrashvili
- (Georgia (country)) Teimuraz Makharadze (July 1, 2008 – Oct 4, 2010)
- (Georgia (country)) Nestor Mumladze (Oct 10, 2010 – Nov 1, 2010)
- (Georgia (country)) Armaz Jeladze (Nov 2010 – Aug 11)
- (Georgia (country)) Koba Zhorzhikashvili (Aug 9, 2011 – Oct 1, 2012)
- (Georgia (country)) Georgi Kipiani (Oct 3, 2012 – May 31, 2013)
- (Georgia (country)) Gela Sanaia (June 1, 2013 – Dec 31, 2013)
- (Georgia (country)) Varlam Kilasonia (Jan 1, 2014–)
