= FC Tskhinvali =

- Full name: FC Tskhinvali
- Nickname: Kartvelebi
- Founded: 1936; 90 years ago
- Dissolved: 2020
- League: N/A
Home colours	Away colours

FC Tskhinvali is a defunct Georgian football club, which in mid-2010s spent four seasons in the top tier of the national league.

Despite the name, due to the enduring Georgian–Ossetian conflict they were unable to host their opponents in the city of Tskhinvali, playing home games instead in Georgian-controlled areas, mostly in Gori, Tbilisi and Rustavi.

In early 2020, the club was disqualified from Liga 3 after their failure to solve a severe financial crisis.

Several times the club has undergone name changes:

- Spartaki until 1990
- Liakhvi from 1990 to 2003
- Tskhinvali from 2003 to 2007
- Spartaki from 2007 to 2015
- Tskhinvali after 2015

== History ==
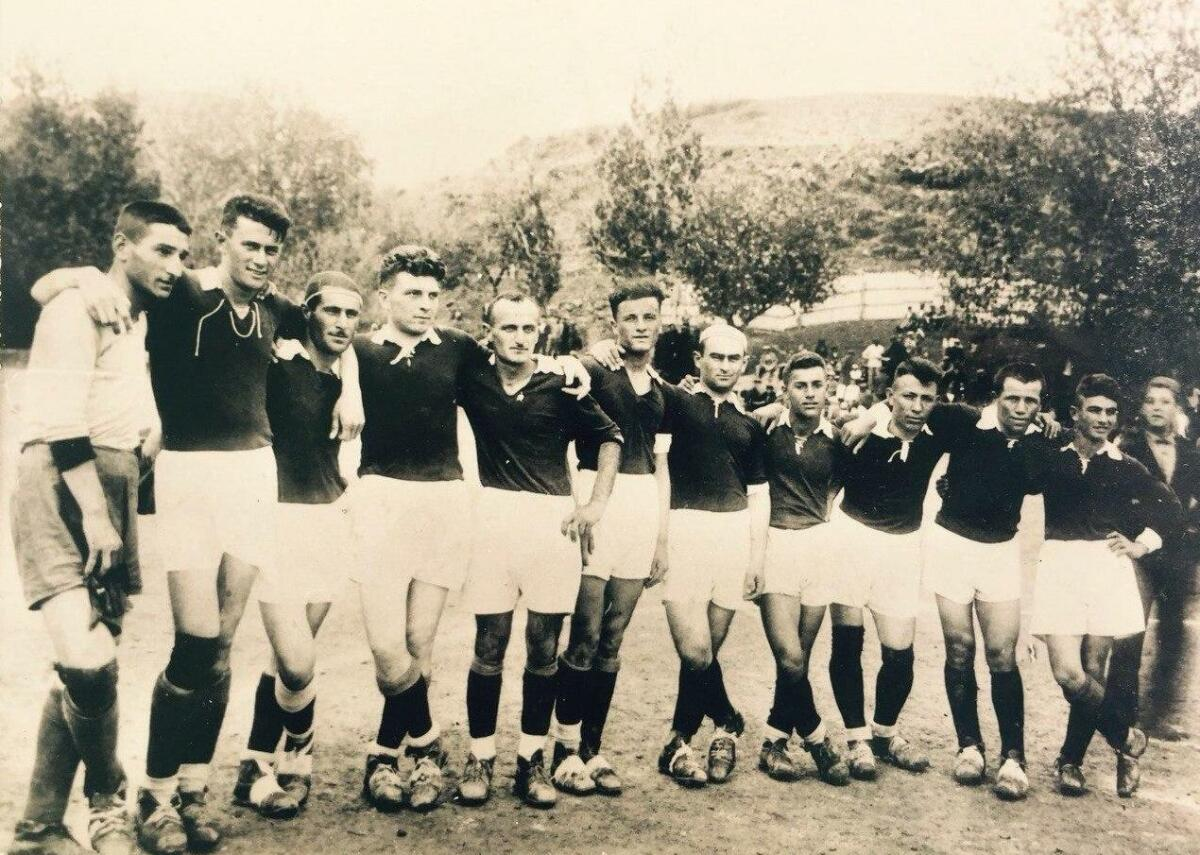
FK Spartak team in 1936

The original Spartaki Tskhinvali were founded in 1936, and during the time of the Soviet Union were a mainstay in the regional Georgian League, which was the fourth division in the Soviet league table. The club's biggest success came in 1987 when they won the regional Georgian Cup.

With the creation of independent Georgian league the club changed their name into Liakhvi and played several games of the first season until being withdrawn from the competition.

The team was restored in 2007, in an effort for the Georgian government to regain control over the break-away region of South Ossetia. Having won the second league in 2013, they were promoted to the Umaglesi Liga.

In January 2015 the team was renamed as FC Tskhinvali. In 2014/15 the club reached semifinals of the national Cup for the first time, but failed to overcome Dinamo Tbilisi (1–2 on aggregate). Their championship game four days prior to the return leg ended with Tskhinvali's sensational 4–1 victory.

In the same season under Kakha Kacharava the team reached their highest position in the league by finishing 4th and qualified for 2015–16 Europa League competition.

Tskhinvali were relegated from Umaglesi Liga after the transitional 2016 season. For three years the team competed in the second division. After an automatic relegation they were supposed to play in Liga 3 the next year, although unable to cope with long-standing financial difficulties, the club was expelled from the league in January 2020.

== Honours ==
- Georgian Soviet Cup
  - Champions: 1987
- Pirveli Liga
  - Champions: 2013
  - Bronze medal winner: 1997, 2005

== Last squad ==
As of August 2019

Note: Flags indicate national team as defined under FIFA eligibility rules; some limited exceptions apply. Players may hold more than one non-FIFA nationality.

No.	Pos.	Nation	Player
1	GK	GEO	Mindia Gogiashvili
2	MF	GEO	Nikoloz Gabelaia
3	DF	GEO	Achiko Shalamberidze
4	DF	GEO	Jemal Gogiashvili
5	DF	GEO	Luka Maghradze
7	MF	GEO	Tornike Mosiashvili
8	MF	GEO	Soso Malania
9	DF	GEO	Beka Kebadze
11	FW	GEO	Guram Kavelashvili
12	GK	GEO	Giorgi Kutateladze
13	DF	GEO	Lasha Khatiashvili
14	MF	GEO	Nikoloz Gabrichidze
16	MF	GEO	Luka Janashia
17	MF	GEO	Luka Beriashvili
18	MF	GEO	Sandro Kvirikashvili

No.	Pos.	Nation	Player
19	MF	GEO	Zviad Gogia
20	DF	GEO	Giorgi Narimanidze
21	MF	GEO	Givi Ioseliani
22	MF	GEO	Tsotne Samushia
23	MF	GEO	Akaki Janelidze
24	MF	GEO	Aleksandre Gamtsemlidze
25	DF	GEO	Giga Cheishvili
26	FW	GEO	Luka Khardziani
27	MF	GEO	Zviad Lobjanidze
29	DF	GEO	Avtandil Siradze
30	GK	GEO	Tariel Khaindrava
32	MF	GEO	Davit Dvalishvili
33	DF	GEO	Giorgi Didebashvili
35	FW	GEO	Giorgi Muzashvili

== Eurocups record ==
Season	Competition	Round	Club	Home	Away
2015–16	UEFA Europa League	1Q	(Romania) FC Botoșani	1–3	1–1

Notes

- 1Q: First qualifying round

== Top scorers ==
Season	Div.	Name	Goals
2012–13	2nd	Zviad Metreveli	21
2013–14	1st	Irakli Ekhvaia, Tornike Tukhareli	4
2014–15	1st	Nika Kacharava	12
2015–16	1st	Nika Kacharava	13
2016	1st	Jaba Dvali	7
2017	2nd	Tamaz Makatsaria	21
2018	2nd	Zviad Metreveli	8
2019	2nd	Data Sitchinava	7

== Managers ==
- (Georgia (country)) Badri Kvaratskhelia (Oct 1, 2010–1?)
- (Georgia (country)) Vladimer Khachidze (Sept 15, 2011 – Oct 30, 2013)
- (Georgia (country)) Kakhaber Kacharava (Nov 1, 2013–)
- (Georgia (country)) Gocha Chikovani ( - April 2017)
- (Georgia (country)) Malkhaz Latsabidze (May 2017 - May 2018)
- (Georgia (country)) Yuri Gabiskiria (June - August 2018)
- (Italy) Roberto Landi (Sep - Oct 2018)
- (Georgia (country)) Malkhaz Latsabidze (Nov - Dec 2018)
- (Spain) Xavier Munoz Sanchez (Mar - Jun 2019)
- (Georgia (country)) Vladimer Vashadze (Jul - Sept 2019)
- (Georgia (country)) Giga Kutivadze (Oct - Dec 2019)
