= FC WIT Georgia =

WIT Georgia
- Full name: Football Club WIT Georgia
- Founded: 1997; 29 years ago
- Ground: Mtskheta Park; Tbilisi, Georgia
- Capacity: 2,000
- Chairman: Guram Rukhadze
- Manager: Aleksandre Intskirveli
- League: Liga 3
- 2025: 6th of 16
Home colours	Away colours	Third colours

FC WIT Georgia is a Georgian football team from Tbilisi. The team is sponsored by WIT Georgia Ltd (a subsidiary of the United States WIT, Inc.), a pet food, accessories, and human and veterinary pharmaceuticals import company. WIT stands for World Innovation Technologies. They play their home games at Mikheil Meskhi Stadium in Tbilisi.

In 2004, FC WIT Georgia won the Georgian Championship, qualifying them for the early stages of the UEFA Champions League. In 2009, they won the championship for the second time. In 2010, the team won the Georgian Cup for the first time. However, performance of WIT Georgia was faded after 2010–11 season and relegated to Pirveli Liga in 2014–15 season. In 2017–18, they finished second in the Erovnuli Liga 2 and secured promotion to the Erovnuli Liga.

== History ==
- 1997: Founded as FC WIT Georgia Tbilisi.

== Honours ==
- Erovnuli Liga
  - Winners (2): 2003–04, 2009
- Georgian Cup
  - Winners (1): 2010
- Georgian Super Cup
  - Winners (1): 2009

== Current squad ==
As of 1 August 2023 Note: Flags indicate national team as defined under FIFA eligibility rules; some limited exceptions apply. Players may hold more than one non-FIFA nationality.

No.	Pos.	Nation	Player
1	GK	GEO	Pavle Todadze
2	DF	GEO	Zaur Kereleishvili
3	DF	GEO	Irakli Javakhishvili
4	DF	GEO	Sulkhan Svianadze
5	DF	GEO	Giorgi Samadashvili
6	MF	GEO	Luka Iashvili
7	MF	GEO	Giorgi Tkemaladze
8	MF	GEO	Tristan Kardava
9	MF	GEO	Tornike Bzekalava
10	FW	GEO	Beka Ketsbaia
11	FW	GEO	Amiran Dzagania
12	GK	GEO	Tamaz Gelkhviidze
13	MF	GEO	Irakli Chkhikvadze

No.	Pos.	Nation	Player
16	MF	GEO	Ilia Sabiashvili
17	MF	GEO	Otar Zviadauri
18	DF	GEO	Irakli Lobjanidze
19	MF	GEO	Saba Jintcharadze
21	DF	GEO	Zurab Tchavtchanidze
22	DF	GEO	Nika Chagunava
23	MF	GEO	Luka Tolordava
24	DF	GEO	Luka Berozashvili
25	GK	GEO	Avto Kapanadze
27	MF	GEO	Tsotne Chotalishvili
29	FW	GEO	Beka Gugberidze
30	DF	GEO	Tornike Shekiladze
—	DF	GEO	Ioseb Turashvili

== European cups history ==
Season	Competition	Round	Country	Team	Home	Away
2000–01	UEFA Cup	QR	(Israel)	Beitar Jerusalem	0–3	1–1
2001	UEFA Intertoto Cup	1R	(Austria)	Ried	1–0	1–2
2001	UEFA Intertoto Cup	2R	(France)	Troyes	1–1	0–6
2002	UEFA Intertoto Cup	1R	(Belgium)	Lokeren	3–2	1–3
2003	UEFA Intertoto Cup	1R	(Austria)	Pasching	2–1	0–1
2004–05	UEFA Champions League	1QR	(Faroe Islands)	HB Tórshavn	5–0	0–3
2004–05	UEFA Champions League	2QR	(Poland)	Wisła Kraków	2–8	0–3
2005	UEFA Intertoto Cup	1R	(Hungary)	Lombard-Papa	0–1	1–2
2006–07	UEFA Cup	1QR	(Slovakia)	Artmedia Petržalka	2–1	0–2
2008–09	UEFA Cup	1QR	(Slovakia)	Spartak Trnava	1–0	2–2
2008–09	UEFA Cup	2QR	(Austria)	Austria Vienna	X	0–2
2009–10	UEFA Champions League	1QR	(Slovenia)	Maribor	0–0	1–3
2010–11	UEFA Europa League	2QR	(Czech Republic)	Baník Ostrava	0–6	0–0

== Managers ==
- (Georgia (country)) Elguja Gugushvili (1997–199?)
- (Georgia (country)) Sergo Kotrikadze (March 8, 1999 – 2001)
- (Georgia (country)) Nestor Mumladze (2006 – August 2009)
- (Georgia (country)) Merab Kochlashvili (August 2009 – 2009)
- (Georgia (country)) Gela Gomelauri (2009–2010)
- (Georgia (country)) Merab Kochlashvili (July 16, 2010–??)
- (Georgia (country)) Zurab Beridze (April 20, 2011 – March 11, 2012)
- (Georgia (country)) Merab Kochlashvili (March 2012–1?)
- (Georgia (country)) Zurab Beridze (April 1, 2013–1?)
- (Georgia (country)) Merab Kochlashvili (June 1, 2013–)
- (Georgia (country)) Tengiz Kobiashvili (2015–)
