= List of Georgian football first tier players with 100 and more goals =

Since the formation of Georgia's independent championship at the beginning of the 1990 season, a total of 19 players have scored 100 or more goals. These players have been collectively referred to as the 100 Club.

Zurab Ionanidze holds the record for the most goals scored in the league. He is the only player with more than 200 goals. Otar Korgalidze became the first player to reach 100 goals, achieving the feat in just 112 games during the 1993–94 season. Merab Megreladze was the oldest player, joining the club at the age of 40 whilst Mikheil Ashvetia was the youngest (21). Paata Machutadze is the highest scoring player for a single team.

Giorgi Gabedava became the most recent footballer to reach 100 on 1 September 2022. Irakli Sikharulidze is the only player currently active in the Erovnuli Liga.

All the club members are Georgians while Giorgi Daraselia holds dual citizenship.

The Erovnuli Liga was launched in 2017 to replace the Umaglesi Liga, although this list includes goals and players from both periods.

== Players ==
Key

- **Bold** shows players still playing in the Erovnuli Liga.

As of matches played on 20 May 2026

List of footballers with 100 or more goals
Rank	Player	Goals	Apps	Ratio	First	Last	Clubs (goals/apps)
1	Zurab Ionanidze	216	422	0.51	1990	2009	Samgurali (15/67), Torpedo (104/171), Samtredia (49/71), Zestaponi (48/113)
2	Levan Khomeriki	140	230	0.61	1991	2005	Dinamo Batumi (80/147), Dinamo Tbilisi (57/75), Locomotive (3/8)
3	**Irakli Sikharulidze**	134	401	0.33	2009	2026	Dinamo Tbilisi (4/21), WIT Georgia (0/12), Metalurgi Rustavi (18/69), Zestaponi (3/5), Samtredia (13/29), Sioni (3/12), Locomotive (62/123), Iberia 1999 (25/116), **Meshakhte** (4/14)
4	Jaba Dvali	127	256	0.50	2003	2018	Dinamo Tbilisi (50/90), Sioni (11/15), Chikhura (2/11), Zestaponi (55/110), Olimpi (0/2), Saburtalo (2/8), Sapovnela (0/9), Tskhinvali (7/11)
5	Giorgi Megreladze	126	256	0.49	1993	2011	Samgurali (5/12), Torpedo (87/184), Dinamo Tbilisi (14/22), Borjomi (5/6), Olimpi (9/24), Baia (6/8)
6	Davit Janashia	122	295	0.41	1990	2007	Torpedo (86/211), Samtredia (33/66), Dinamo Batumi (2/13), Zestaponi (1/5)
7	Mikheil Ashvetia	121	141	0.86	1995	2001	Samgurali (5/14), Torpedo (67/70), Dinamo Tbilisi (49/57)
8	Dimitri Tatanashvili	116	318	0.36	2003	2018	Spartaki Tbilisi (5/31), Ameri (25/58), Dinamo Tbilisi (4/21), Metalurgi Rustavi (19/55), Chikhura (31/57), Zestaponi (3/13), Dinamo Batumi (5/22) Sioni (18/41), Saburtalo (6/20)
9	Zviad Endeladze	112	208	0.54	1991	2002	Samtredia (18/36), Margveti (62/90), Odishi (12/36), Guria (3/14), Metalurgi Zestaponi (17/32)
10	Giorgi Daraselia (Note: Also played in the top division of Soviet football prior to the formation of the Umaglesi Liga in 1990)	107	227	0.47	1990	1996	Torpedo (34/110), Kolkheti 1913 (58/83), Samtredia (15/34)
11	Paata Machutadze	106	282	0.38	1991	2002	Mertskhali (2/8), Dinamo Batumi (104/274)
12	Otar Korgalidze (Note: Also played and scored in the top Soviet league prior to 1990)	105	134	0.77	1990	1996	Guria (81/102), Alazani (23/27), Dinamo Tbilisi (1/5), Odishi (0/3)
13	Merab Megreladze	104	142	0.73	1990	1997	Torpedo (23/40), Guria (9/40), Samgurali (41/31), Margveti (31/31)
14	Mamuka Jugeli	102	182	0.56	1990	2001	Torpedo (5/15), Kolkheti 1913 (30/50), Margveti (52/85), Locomotive (8/11), Gorda (7/21)
14	Davit Goderdzishvili	102	255	0.40	1993	2006	Sapovnela (26/54), Shevardeni 1906 (9/16), Guria (5/14), Merani (25/54), Locomotive (21/57), Sioni (11/34), Gorda (4/13), Milani (0/4), Kolkheti 1913 (1/8), Chikhura (0/1)
16	Davit Makharadze	101	178	0.57	1990	1999	Kolkheti 1913 (72/133), Dinamo Batumi (8/18), Guria (21/27)
16	Suliko Davitashvili	101	286	0.35	1996	2009	Merani-91 (42/118), Sioni (1/32), Locomotive (13/29), Merani-Olimpi (18/27), Torpedo (7/8), Ameri (20/72)
16	Giorgi Gabedava	101	333	0.30	2007	2022	Mglebi (1/12), Olimpi (1/10), Gagra (18/66), Baia / Zugdidi (9/42), Chikhura (40/93), Samtredia (2/20), Dinamo Batumi (3/11), Saburtalo (7/19), Dinamo Tbilisi (20/60)
19	Mamuka Khundadze	100	221	0.45	1990	2002	Samgurali (10/57), Torpedo (76/130), Margveti (14/34)
