= 1998–99 Georgian Cup =

Tournament details
- Country: Georgia
- Teams: 64

Final positions
- Champions: Torpedo Kutaisi
- Runners-up: Samgurali Tskaltubo

The 1998–99 Georgian Cup (also known as the David Kipiani Cup) was the fifty-fifth season overall and ninth since independence of the Georgian annual football tournament.

== Preliminary round ==
| Team 1 | Agg. | Team 2 | 1st leg | 2nd leg |
|---|---|---|---|---|
| Zhineri Zhinvali | 3–3 (a) | Locomotive-2 Tbilisi | 1–1 | 2–2 |
| Chabukiani | 7–0 | Alazani Gurjaani | 5–0 | 2–0 |
| Kakheti Telavi | 0–1 | Kvareli | 0–0 | 0–1 |
| Khalibi-97 Rustavi | 0–1 | Zooveti Tbilisi | 0–1 | 0–0 |
| Dinamo-2 Tbilisi | 1–2 | SSS-Akademia Tbilisi | 1–0 | 0–2 |
| Tori Borjomi | 4–7 | Iveria Khashuri | 0–1 | 0–3 |
| Tskhumi Sokhumi | 2–5 | SAU Tbilisi | 1–1 | 1–4 |
| Arsenali-2 Tbilisi | 3–2 | Dinamo-3 Tbilisi | 3–2 | 0–0 |
| Universiteti-Iberia Tbilisi | 3–3 (a) | Mretebi Tbilisi | 3–1 | 0–2 |
| Tskhinvali | w/o | Meskheti Akhaltsikhe | 5–0 | – |
| Dila-2 Gori | 4–8 | Iberia Kareli | 2–3 | 2–5 |
| Enguri Ganmukhuri | 4–3 | Skuri Tsalenjikha | 2–1 | 2–2 |
| Kolkheti Khobi | 3–2 | Odishi-2 Zugdidi | 2–0 | 1–2 |
| Salkhino Martvili | 3–4 | Samegrelo Chkhorotsku | 3–1 | 0–3 |
| Egrisi Senaki | 2–8 | Kolkheti-2 Poti | 2–0 | 0–8 |
| Bakhmaro Chokhatauri | 2–4 | Mertskhali Ozurgeti | 2–1 | 0–3 |
| Shukura Kobuleti | 3–3 (a) | College Tbilisi | 3–1 | 0–2 |
| Samgurali-2 Tskaltubo | 5–3 | Meshakhte Tkibuli | 3–2 | 2–1 |
| Torpedo-2 Kutaisi | 5–3 | Dinamo Gagra | 4–1 | 1–2 |
| Margveti Zestaponi | 5–3 | Magharoeli Chiatura | 2–1 | 1–3 |
| Sulori Vani | 4–5 | Iberia-2 Samtredia | 4–3 | 0–2 |
| Rioni Kutaisi | 9–1 | Imereti Khoni | 8–0 | 1–1 |
| Fazisi Poti | 6–2 | Okeane Samtredia | 3–0 | 3–2 |
| Algeti Marneuli | w/o | SK Iberia Tbilisi | – | – |

== Round of 64 ==
| Team 1 | Agg. | Team 2 | 1st leg | 2nd leg |
|---|---|---|---|---|
| Algeti Marneuli | 2–3 | Zooveti Tbilisi | 2–0 | 0–3 |
| SSS-Akademia Tbilisi | 8–2 | Mretebi Tbilisi | 3–2 | 5–0 |
| Arsenali-2 Tbilisi | 0–2 | Iberia Kareli | 0–0 | 0–2 |
| Zhineri Zhinvali | 2–7 | SAU Tbilisi | 2–3 | 0–4 |
| Meskheti Akhaltsikhe | 4–7 | Iveria Khashuri | 3–4 | 1–3 |
| Kvareli | 4–1 | Chabukiani | 2–0 | 2–1 |
| Enguri Ganmukhuri | 6–5 | Fazisi Poti | 5–3 | 1–2 |
| Samegrelo Chkhorotsku | 4–4 (a) | Kolkheti Khobi | 2–1 | 2–3 |
| Kolkheti-2 Poti | 0–3 | Iberia-2 Samtredia | 0–0 | 0–3 |
| Mertskhali Ozurgeti | 2–5 | College Tbilisi | 2–2 | 0–3 |
| Torpedo-2 Kutaisi | 3–4 | Margveti Zestaponi | 2–1 | 1–3 |
| Samgurali-2 Tskaltubo | 1–3 | Rioni Kutaisi | 1–1 | 0–2 |

== Round of 32 ==
| Team 1 | Agg. | Team 2 | 1st leg | 2nd leg |
|---|---|---|---|---|
| Merani-91 Tbilisi | 10–2 | Zooveti Tbilisi | 8–1 | 2–1 |
| Gorda Rustavi | 2–0 | Kvareli | 1–0 | 1–0 |
| Sioni Bolnisi | 4–0 | SSS-Akademia Tbilisi | 3–1 | 1–0 |
| Arsenali Tbilisi | 5–0 | Iberia Kareli | 4–0 | 1–0 |
| Locomotive Tbilisi | 6–0 | Iveria Khashuri | 4–0 | 2–0 |
| WIT Georgia | 4–2 | Margveti Zestaponi | 4–0 | 0–2 |
| Dila Gori | 5–2 | Rioni Kutaisi | 4–0 | 1–2 |
| Samgurali Tskaltubo | 8–0 | Iberia-2 Samtredia | 1–0 | 7–0 |
| Odishi Zugdidi | 4–1 | Enguri Ganmukhuri | 1–1 | 3–0 |
| Iberia Samtredia | 6–3 | Samegrelo Chkhorotsku | 1–1 | 5–2 |
| TSU Tbilisi | 6–0 | SAU Tbilisi | 0–0 | 6–0 |
| Guria Lanchkhuti | w/o | College Tbilisi | – | – |

== Round of 16 ==
| Team 1 | Agg. | Team 2 | 1st leg | 2nd leg |
|---|---|---|---|---|
| Dinamo Tbilisi | 0–0 (2–4 p) | Locomotive Tbilisi | 0–0 | 0–0 (a.e.t.) |
| Dila Gori | 1–4 | Dinamo Batumi | 1–2 | 0–2 |
| College Tbilisi | 1–5 | Arsenali Tbilisi | 1–1 | 0–4 |
| Gorda Rustavi | 2–3 | Sioni Bolnisi | 2–1 | 0–2 |
| Iberia Samtredia | 2–3 | Samgurali Tskaltubo | 1–1 | 1–2 |
| TSU Tbilisi | 2–2 (a) | WIT Georgia | 2–2 | 0–0 |
| Merani-91 Tbilisi | 3–1 | Odishi Zugdidi | 3–0 | 0–1 |
| Kolkheti-1913 Poti | 2–3 | Torpedo Kutaisi | 3–1 | 1–4 (a.e.t.) |

== Quarterfinals ==
| Team 1 | Agg. | Team 2 | 1st leg | 2nd leg |
|---|---|---|---|---|
| Locomotive Tbilisi | 0–0 (3–2 p) | Dinamo Batumi | 0–0 | 0–0 (a.e.t.) |
| Torpedo Kutaisi | 9–0 | Gorda Rustavi | 8–0 | 1–0 |
| Arsenali Tbilisi | 4–2 | Merani-91 Tbilisi | 3–0 | 1–2 |
| WIT Georgia | 2–2 (2–4 p) | Samgurali Tskaltubo | 2–0 | 0–2 (a.e.t.) |

== Semifinals ==
| Team 1 | Agg. | Team 2 | 1st leg | 2nd leg |
|---|---|---|---|---|
| Arsenali Tbilisi | 1–5 | Torpedo Kutaisi | 1–2 | 0–3 |
| Locomotive Tbilisi | 0–1 | Samgurali Tskaltubo | 0–0 | 0–1 |

== Final ==
26 May 1999

| Torpedo Kutaisi | 0–0 (a.e.t.) | Samgurali Tskaltubo |
|---|---|---|
| | Report |
Penalties
| Ionanidze (penalty scored); Janashia (penalty scored); Mazanishvili (penalty scored); Imedadze (penalty scored) | 4–2 | (penalty scored) Sukhiashvili; (penalty scored) Shengelia; (penalty missed) Jincharadze; (penalty missed) Kilasonia |

Boris Paichadze Stadium, Tbilisi
Attendance: 9,000
Referee: Sergo Kvaratskhelia (Zugdidi)

== See also ==
- 1998–99 Umaglesi Liga
- 1998–99 Pirveli Liga
