= Davit Goderdzishvili =

Georgian footballer

Personal information
- Date of birth: 13 May 1973
- Height: 1.70 m (5 ft 7 in)
- Position: Forward

Senior career*
Years	Team	Apps	(Gls)
1990–1991	Mretebi	39	(14)
1991–1993	Armazi-90	45	(23)
1993–1995	Sapovnela	54	(26)
1995	Shevardeni 1906	16	(9)
1996	Guria	14	(5)
1996	Merani-91	15	(9)
1997	Locomotive	11	(6)
1998	Merani-91	14	(5)
1998–1999	Locomotive	26	(9)
1999	Sioni	13	(3)
2000	Locomotive	11	(3)
2000–2001	Merani-91	25	(11)
2001	Gorda	13	(4)
2002	Locomotive	9	(3)
2002	Milani	4	(0)
2003	Sioni	21	(8)
2003	Kolkheti 1913	8	(1)
2004–2007	Chikhura	56	(41)
- * Club domestic league appearances and goals

Davit Goderdzishvili (Georgian: დავით გოდერძიშვილი; born 13 May 1973) is a retired Georgian football player who played as a forward.

Goderdzishvili spent his entire career in Georgia. He is a member of the 100 club comprising the players with a hundred or more goals.

== Career ==
Goderdzishvili started his career at 2nd division club Mretebi in 1990. After two seasons, he joined Armazi-90 playing also in the 2nd league. Following these four years in which he scored 37 goals, Goderdzishvili made his debut in the Umaglesi Liga on 8 August 1993 for Sapovnela who convincingly beat Metalurgi 3–0 in their first ever top-flight game.

On 12 July 1997, Goderdzishvili scored his first European goal as Merani-91 secured a 3–1 away victory over Austrian side SV Ried in a UEFA Intertoto Cup tie.

Although he frequently changed the clubs, in most cases Goderdzishvili would display his goalscoring skills in full, becoming a team top scorer. After the 2000–01 Umaglesi Liga season, he shared third place in the goalscoring race with Zurab Ionanidze and two years later, he came fifth in the charts along with two other players. On 6 November 2002, Goderdzishvili notched a goal for Locomotive against Milani to enter the 100 club as its 13th member.

In 2004, Goderdzishvili joined 2nd division club Chikhura. Over next three years, he netted 41 times and helped them gain promotion to the top flight. In August 2006, Goderdzishvili played in the Umaglesi Liga for the last time before deciding to hang up his boots at the age of 33.

He racked up 181 goals in 391 league appearances, including 102 goals in 255 top-flight games for eleven teams.

== Honours ==
Mretebi

- Pirveli Liga winner: 1991

Chikhura

- Pirveli Liga winner: 2005–06
