= Mamuka Khundadze =

Georgian footballer

Personal information
- Date of birth: 18 July 1966 (age 60)
- Place of birth: Kutaisi, Georgian SSR, USSR
- Position: Striker

Youth career
- Torpedo Kutaisi

Senior career*
Years	Team	Apps	(Gls)
1984–1987	Torpedo	28	(0)
1990	Samgurali	23	(2)
1991–1993	Torpedo	86	(42)
1993–1994	Margveti	34	(14)
1994–1996	Torpedo	44	(34)
1996–1997	Dinamo Stavropol	49	(12)
1997–1999	Lokomotiv S.Petersburg	70	(6)
1999–2000	Samgurali	11	(2)
2000–2001	Kapaz	9	(2)
2002–2003	Samgurali	23	(6)

Managerial career
- 2011–2012: Chkherimela
- 2015: Odishi 1919 II
- 2015–2016: Sapovnela
- * Club domestic league appearances and goals

Mamuka Khundadze (Georgian: მამუკა ხუნდაძე; born 18 July 1966) is a former Georgian football player and manager.

Khundadze spent most of his career at Torpedo Kutaisi where he was a three-time team topscorer. He is also a member of the 100 club.

== Career ==
A product of Kutaisi's youth sport school, Khundadze started his career at Torpedo in 1984 in the 2nd division of Soviet football. Following their promotion to the Top League a year later, Khundadze took part in 12 games, making his debut against Spartak Moscow as a substitute on 1 June 1986.

After Georgia broke away from the Soviet Championship in February 1990, Khundadze joined Samgurali and played their first Umaglesi Liga game on 31 March 1990. A year later, he moved back to Torpedo and helped the team with a third-place finish. Three times between 1991 and 1996, Khundadze finished as the team topscorer with 54 goals in total. Especially prolific he was in the 1994–95 season when he finished second in the goalscoring charts behind Giorgi Daraselia. Khundadze scored Torpedo's 200th and 300th goals in the national league. Ultimately, he accrued 76 goals in 130 league appearances for the team.

After several seasons spent in Russian and Azerbaijani leagues, Khundadze returned home to play for Samgurali in two more spells. On 8 May 2002, he scored against WIT Georgia to become the 12th member of the 100 club of players with a hundred and more goals. It turned out his last career goal as he retired at the end of the 2001–02 season after taking part in another two games.

== Managerial career ==
Khundadze was initially in charge of low-league teams before taking up a managerial role at Umaglesi Liga side Sapovnela. In the 2015–16 season, his team kept its survival chance up until the final round but suffered relegation following a narrow loss to Chikhura.

Khundadze has also worked with Torpedo's U19 team.
