= Davit Makharadze =

Georgian footballer

Personal information
- Date of birth: 10 November 1965 (age 60)
- Place of birth: Poti, Georgian SSR
- Position: Forward

Senior career*
| Years | Team | Apps | (Gls) |
| 1982 | Kolkheti Poti | | |
| 1984–1985 | Dinamo Batumi | 9 | (1) |
| 1987–1988 | Mertskhali | 9 | (2) |
| 1989 | Torpedo | 24 | (3) |
| 1990–1991 | Kolkheti 1913 | 49 | (28) |
| 1991–1992 | Alki Larnaka | 23 | (2) |
| 1992–1995 | Kolkheti 1913 | 61 | (33) |
| 1995–1996 | Dinamo Batumi | 18 | (8) |
| 1996–1998 | Kolkheti 1913 | 23 | (11) |
| 1998–2000 | Guria | 27 | (21) |

Managerial career
- 2011–2012: Kolkheti 1913
- 2013: Guria
- 2014: Guria
- 2017: Zugdidi
- 2017–18: Guria
- 2020: Kolkheti 1913
- * Club domestic league appearances and goals

Davit "Dato" Makharadze (Georgian: დავით მახარაძე; born 10 November 1965) is a retired Georgian football player and manager.

Makharadze spent most of his career at his hometown club Kolkheti 1913 in four spells. He is a member of the 100 club comprising the Georgian players with a hundred or more goals. After his retirement, Makharadze worked at several clubs as a head coach.

== Playing career ==
Makharadze started his career at Kolkheti Poti in 1982 while the team was taking part in the 3rd division of Soviet football. Two years later, he joined Dinamo Batumi in the Soviet First League and scored his first professional goal in a 1–1 home draw against SKA Karpaty on 18 October 1985.

When Georgia formed its national championship in 1990, Makharadze moved back to Kolkheti 1913. He played in an inaugurating Umaglesi Liga game against Dinamo Tbilisi in which the latter suffered a shock home defeat. Makharadze finished the season as a team topscorer with 18 league goals. In 1994, he came fourth in the goalscoring race, as his team took second place in the table.

In the summer of 1995, Makharadze moved to Dinamo Batumi who made a debut in a UEFA competition this season. On 14 September 1995, he made his first European appearance against Celtic as a half-time substitute.

In 1998, Makharadze was transferred to Guria. During the 1998–99 season, he netted 21 times, coming second among the league goalscorers behind Giorgi Daraselia only. On 19 May 1999, Makharadze scored against Merani-91 to join the 100 club as its 6th member. A year later, he announced retirement at the age of 35.

In total, Makharadze spent seven out of his ten Umaglesi Liga seasons at Kolkheti 1913, scoring 72 times in 133 appearances.

== Managerial career ==
Makharadze returned to Kolkheti as a manager in 2011. Two years later, he was appointed at Guria. In an interview published in early January 2014, Makharadze described how unhealthy the situation was in Lanchkhuti and blasted the management for severe problems existing in the club. However, later he took charge of Guria two more times.

Makharadze also had a short-time tenure at 2nd division club Zugdidi in 2017.

== Honours ==
Kolkheti 1913

- Umaglesi Liga runner-up: 1993–94
