= 1998–99 Umaglesi Liga =

Georgian Premier League season

Umaglesi Liga
- Season: 1998–99
- Dates: 6 August 1998 – 23 May 1999
- Champions: Dinamo Tbilisi; 10th Georgian title
- Relegated: Odishi Zugdidi; Guria Lanchkhuti
- Champions League: Dinamo Tbilisi
- UEFA Cup: Torpedo Kutaisi; Locomotive Tbilisi
- Intertoto Cup: Kolkheti Poti
- Matches: 240
- Goals: 678 (2.83 per match)
- Top goalscorer: Mikheil Ashvetia (26)
- Biggest home win: Dinamo Batumi 9–0 Odishi
- Biggest away win: Gorda 1–7 Torpedo; Arsenali 1–7 Dinamo Tbilisi
- Highest scoring: Guria 3–7 Merani

The 1998–99 Umaglesi Liga was the tenth season of top-tier football in Georgia. It began on 6 August 1998 and ended on 23 May 1999. Dinamo Tbilisi were the defending champions.

== Locations ==
Location of teams in 1998–99 Umaglesi Liga

== League standings ==
Pos	Team	Pld	W	D	L	GF	GA	GD	Pts	Qualification or relegation
1	Dinamo Tbilisi (C)	30	24	5	1	91	17	+74	77	Qualification for the Champions League second qualifying round
2	Torpedo Kutaisi	30	21	4	5	73	27	+46	67	Qualification for the UEFA Cup qualifying round
3	Locomotive Tbilisi	30	18	10	2	43	14	+29	64	Qualification for the UEFA Cup qualifying round
4	Kolkheti-1913 Poti	30	15	7	8	57	36	+21	52	Qualification for the Intertoto Cup first round
5	Dinamo Batumi	30	13	11	6	49	22	+27	50	
6	Merani-91 Tbilisi	30	12	9	9	37	29	+8	45	
7	WIT Georgia (Note: WIT Georgia were docked 3 points for the Giorgi Chankotadze's assault on the referee in the round 10 match against Merani.)	30	14	5	11	42	29	+13	44	
8	Iberia Samtredia	30	11	5	14	45	48	−3	38	
9	Arsenali Tbilisi	30	9	11	10	34	44	−10	38	
10	Dila Gori	30	10	5	15	37	54	−17	35	
11	Samgurali Tskaltubo	30	10	3	17	32	57	−25	33	
12	Gorda Rustavi	30	7	11	12	28	46	−18	32	
13	Sioni Bolnisi (O)	30	7	7	16	27	52	−25	28	Qualification to Relegation play-offs
14	TSU Tbilisi (O)	30	6	9	15	28	46	−18	27	Qualification to Relegation play-offs
15	Odishi Zugdidi (R)	30	6	2	22	21	70	−49	20	Relegation to Pirveli Liga
16	Guria Lanchkhuti (R)	30	3	4	23	34	87	−53	13	Relegation to Pirveli Liga

Source: rsssf.org
Rules for classification: 1st points; 2nd matches won; 3rd head-to-head
(C) Champions; (O) Play-off winners; (R) Relegated

== Results ==
Home \ Away	ARS	DIL	DBA	DIN	GOR	GUR	IBS	KOL	LOC	MER	ODI	SMG	SIO	TKU	TSU	WIT
Arsenali Tbilisi		2–2	0–1	1–7	1–0	5–1	2–5	0–0	0–0	1–1	3–0	1–1	2–1	0–2	0–0	0–0
Dila Gori	1–2		0–1	1–2	3–0	5–3	2–1	2–1	0–2	3–3	1–0	0–1	2–0	3–0	0–0	1–3
Dinamo Batumi	1–1	6–0		0–0	1–1	4–0	1–0	2–1	1–1	0–0	9–0	6–1	1–0	2–1	4–2	0–1
Dinamo Tbilisi	5–1	4–0	1–1		2–0	7–1	7–2	6–1	1–0	5–1	5–0	6–0	8–1	1–0	0–0	3–2
Gorda Rustavi	0–1	1–1	0–0	0–0		2–2	1–0	0–0	0–2	0–3	6–2	2–0	3–1	1–7	0–0	3–2
Guria Lanchkhuti	0–2	4–2	0–1	0–1	3–4		1–3	1–4	0–4	3–7	1–2	2–3	1–1	1–5	2–0	2–0
Iberia Samtredia	3–1	2–0	3–1	0–1	1–2	4–1		2–2	2–3	0–0	0–0	3–1	1–2	0–0	4–2	0–1
Kolkheti-1913 Poti	3–2	2–3	1–0	0–1	5–0	3–0	3–1		0–0	3–0	5–1	4–2	4–0	1–2	2–0	2–1
Locomotive Tbilisi	2–1	0–0	1–0	0–0	0–0	1–0	2–0	1–1		1–0	3–0	2–0	3–0	1–1	3–1	1–0
Merani-91 Tbilisi	0–0	4–0	1–0	0–2	1–1	3–0	0–2	1–0	0–0		0–1	0–0	2–0	2–1	1–0	0–0
Odishi Zugdidi	1–2	2–1	2–1	0–4	1–0	4–2	0–1	0–2	0–1	0–1		0–2	1–4	1–3	1–1	1–3
Samgurali Tskaltubo	2–0	3–1	0–0	0–3	1–0	2–1	2–3	0–1	1–2	1–2	1–0		1–0	2–3	0–1	1–3
Sioni Bolnisi	0–1	1–0	1–1	1–3	0–0	2–2	1–0	1–1	0–0	1–4	1–0	4–0		1–2	1–1	2–1
Torpedo Kutaisi	1–1	3–0	3–3	3–1	4–0	3–0	4–0	5–1	3–1	2–0	2–0	3–1	4–0		1–0	0–1
TSU Tbilisi	4–1	0–1	0–1	1–3	0–0	0–0	1–1	2–4	1–4	1–0	4–1	1–3	1–0	1–3		2–5
WIT Georgia	0–0	1–2	0–0	0–2	2–1	3–0	4–1	0–0	1–2	1–0	1–0	3–0	2–0	1–2	0–1	

Source: rsssf.org
Legend: Blue = home team win; Yellow = draw; Red = away team win.

== Relegation play-offs ==
First round

Sioni Bolnisi	2 – 0	TSU Tbilisi

Sioni Bolnisi remain at Umaglesi Liga. TSU Tbilisi entered losing side playoffs

Dinamo-2 Tbilisi	1 – 1	Gortskali Dzveli Anaga
Penalties
	4 – 2

Kolkheti Khobi	1 – 0	Sulori Vani

Dinamo-2 Tbilisi promoted and renamed as Tbilisi. Kolkheti Khobi promoted.

Second round

Gortskali Dzveli Anaga	2 – 0	Sulori Vani

TSU Tbilisi	3 – 0	Gortskali Dzveli Anaga

TSU Tbilisi remain at Umaglesi Liga.

== Top goalscorers ==
Rank	Goalscorer	Team	Goals
1	(Georgia (country)) Mikhail Ashvetia	Dinamo Tbilisi	26
2	(Georgia (country)) Davit Makharadze	Guria Lanchkhuti	21
3	(Georgia (country)) Levan Khomeriki	Dinamo Batumi	18
4	(Georgia (country)) Zurab Ionanidze	Torpedo Kutaisi	16
5	(Georgia (country)) Hamlet Tsivtsivadze	Locomotive Tbilisi	15

== See also ==
- 1998–99 Pirveli Liga
- 1998–99 Georgian Cup
