= 2004–05 Umaglesi Liga =

Football tournament

Umaglesi Liga
- Season: 2004–05
- Dates: 31 July 2004 – 30 May 2005
- Champions: Dinamo Tbilisi; 12th Georgian title
- Relegated: None
- Champions League: Dinamo Tbilisi
- UEFA Cup: Torpedo Kutaisi; Locomotive Tbilisi
- Intertoto Cup: WIT Georgia
- Matches played: 180
- Goals scored: 446 (2.48 per match)
- Top goalscorer: Levan Melkadze (27)
- Biggest home win: Dinamo Tbilisi 9–0 Dila
- Biggest away win: Locomotive 2–5 Dinamo Tbilisi; Zestaponi 1–4 Lokomotivi; Dila 1–4 Dinamo Tbilisi; Kolkheti 0–3 Locomotive; Tbilisi 0–3 Zestaponi; Dila 0–3 Dinamo Tbilisi
- Highest scoring: Dinamo Tbilisi 9–0 Dila

The 2004–05 Umaglesi Liga was the sixteenth season of top-tier football in Georgia. It began on 31 July 2004 and ended on 30 May 2005. WIT Georgia were the defending champions.

== Locations ==
Location of teams in 2004–05 Umaglesi Liga

== League standings ==
Pos	Team	Pld	W	D	L	GF	GA	GD	Pts	Qualification
1	Dinamo Tbilisi (C)	36	23	6	7	73	27	+46	75	Qualification for the Champions League first qualifying round
2	Torpedo Kutaisi	36	20	10	6	56	31	+25	70	Qualification for the UEFA Cup first qualifying round
3	FC Tbilisi	36	21	6	9	60	40	+20	69	
4	Locomotive Tbilisi	36	16	15	5	42	24	+18	63	Qualification for the UEFA Cup first qualifying round
5	Zestaponi	36	16	5	15	38	48	−10	53	
6	WIT Georgia	36	13	9	14	54	41	+13	48	Qualification for the Intertoto Cup first round
7	Sioni Bolnisi	36	12	4	20	35	56	−21	40	
8	Dinamo Batumi	36	9	12	15	35	33	+2	39	
9	Kolkheti-1913 Poti	36	9	5	22	32	63	−31	32	
10	Dila Gori	36	2	4	30	20	88	−68	10	

Source: rsssf.org
Rules for classification: 1st points; 2nd matches won; 3rd head-to-head
(C) Champions

== Results ==
The ten teams will play each other four times in this league for a total of 36 matches per team. In the first half of the season each team played every other team twice (home and away) and then do the same in the second half of the season.

=== First half of season ===
Home \ Away	DIL	DBA	DIN	KOL	LOC	SIO	TBI	TKU	WIT	ZES
Dila Gori		0–1	1–4	2–0	0–0	2–1	2–2	0–1	1–3	0–1
Dinamo Batumi	2–0		3–0	0–0	1–1	2–0	1–1	0–1	1–1	5–0
Dinamo Tbilisi	3–0	1–0		4–0	0–0	6–0	4–1	1–2	3–2	2–0
Kolkheti-1913 Poti	4–0	0–1	0–0		0–3	3–0	1–0	0–1	1–2	2–0
Locomotive Tbilisi	3–1	0–0	2–5	2–0		4–0	3–1	1–0	0–0	1–2
Sioni Bolnisi	3–2	1–0	0–1	2–2	1–1		0–2	0–2	3–2	2–1
FC Tbilisi	4–1	3–2	5–0	3–0	3–1	3–1		1–1	0–2	2–0
Torpedo Kutaisi	2–1	2–0	1–1	1–1	2–0	5–0	2–2		1–1	4–0
WIT Georgia	2–0	3–2	2–3	2–1	0–0	2–1	0–2	1–3		4–0
Zestaponi	2–0	2–1	0–2	1–2	1–4	1–0	1–3	1–1	3–1	

Source: rsssf.org
Legend: Blue = home team win; Yellow = draw; Red = away team win.

=== Second half of season ===
Home \ Away	DIL	DBA	DIN	KOL	LOC	SIO	TBI	TKU	WIT	ZES
Dila Gori		0–0	0–3	1–2	0–1	0–2	0–1	1–3	0–4	1–2
Dinamo Batumi	3–0		1–2	3–0	0–0	1–2	0–1	0–1	0–0	0–0
Dinamo Tbilisi	9–0	3–0		3–0	0–0	1–0	0–1	1–2	1–0	0–1
Kolkheti-1913 Poti	6–2	0–1	0–2		1–2	0–3	0–1	2–1	0–0	1–0
Locomotive Tbilisi	0–0	1–1	0–0	3–0		2–0	1–0	0–0	1–0	1–0
Sioni Bolnisi	3–0	2–1	0–1	3–0	0–1		0–2	0–1	1–1	2–1
FC Tbilisi	2–1	1–0	1–3	3–2	4–1	1–0		2–2	2–1	0–3
Torpedo Kutaisi	2–1	1–1	1–4	3–0	0–0	2–0	– (Note: The match between Torpedo and Tbilisi was abandoned in the 85th minute with the score of 1–0 for Torpedo due to a mass fighting. The match result was cancelled and both teams were awarded a 0–3 loss.)		2–1	0–1
WIT Georgia	4–0	1–1	1–0	6–0	0–1	0–2	0–0	1–2		1–2
Zestaponi	3–0	2–0	0–0	2–1	1–1	0–0	1–0	2–1	1–3	

Source: rsssf.org
Legend: Blue = home team win; Yellow = draw; Red = away team win.

== Top goalscorers ==
Rank	Goalscorer	Team	Goals
1	(Georgia (country)) Levan Melkadze	Dinamo Tbilisi	27
2	(Georgia (country)) Giorgi Megreladze	Torpedo Kutaisi	23
3	(Georgia (country)) Giorgi Fifia	FC Tbilisi	13
4	(Georgia (country)) Mikheil Bobokhidze	Lokomotivi Tbilisi	12
4	(Georgia (country)) Otar Martsvaladze	WIT Georgia	12
4	(Georgia (country)) David Odikadze	Tbilisi / Dinamo Tbilisi	12
7	(Georgia (country)) Robert Zirakishvili	Zestaponi	10
8	(Georgia (country)) Jaba Dvali	Dinamo Tbilisi	9
8	(Georgia (country)) Aleksandre Iashvili	FC Tbilisi	9

== See also ==
- 2004–05 Pirveli Liga
- 2004–05 Georgian Cup
