= 2000–01 Umaglesi Liga =

Umaglesi Liga
- Season: 2000–01
- Dates: 19 August 2000 – 23 May 2001
- Champions: Torpedo Kutaisi; 2nd Georgian title
- Relegated: Dila Gori; TSU Tbilisi; Iberia Samtredia
- Champions League: Torpedo Kutaisi
- UEFA Cup: Locomotive Tbilisi; Dinamo Tbilisi
- Intertoto Cup: WIT Georgia
- Matches played: 192
- Goals scored: 450 (2.34 per match)
- Top goalscorer: Zaza Zirakishvili (21)
- Biggest home win: Dinamo Tbilisi 9–0 Sioni
- Biggest away win: Iberia 0–5 Dinamo Tbilisi; Iberia 0–5 Dinamo Batumi
- Highest scoring: Dinamo Tbilisi 9–0 Sioni

The 2000–01 Umaglesi Liga was the twelfth season of top-tier football in Georgia. It began on 19 August 2000 and ended on 23 May 2001. Torpedo Kutaisi were the defending champions.

== Locations ==
Location of teams in 2000–01 Umaglesi Liga

== First stage ==
=== League table ===
Pos	Team	Pld	W	D	L	GF	GA	GD	Pts	Qualification
1	Locomotive Tbilisi	22	18	2	2	41	7	+34	56	Qualification to Championship group
2	Dinamo Tbilisi	22	15	3	4	52	20	+32	48	Qualification to Championship group
3	Torpedo Kutaisi	22	14	6	2	33	7	+26	48	Qualification to Championship group
4	WIT Georgia	22	10	8	4	29	15	+14	38	Qualification to Championship group
5	Merani-91 Tbilisi	22	8	8	6	22	21	+1	32	Qualification to Championship group
6	Kolkheti-1913 Poti	22	8	7	7	22	18	+4	31	Qualification to Championship group
7	Dinamo Batumi	22	8	4	10	34	29	+5	28	Qualification to Relegation group
8	Sioni Bolnisi	22	7	5	10	17	28	−11	26	Qualification to Relegation group
9	TSU Armazi Tbilisi	22	5	4	13	19	37	−18	19	Qualification to Relegation group
10	Dila Gori	22	5	3	14	14	44	−30	18	Qualification to Relegation group
11	Gorda Rustavi	22	3	9	10	16	29	−13	18	Qualification to Relegation group
12	Iberia Samtredia	22	0	3	19	3	47	−44	3	Qualification to Relegation group

Source: rsssf.org
Rules for classification: 1st points; 2nd matches won; 3rd head-to-head

=== Results ===
Home \ Away	DIL	DBA	DIN	GOR	IBS	KOL	LOC	MER	SIO	TKU	TSU	WIT
Dila Gori		0–4	2–2	2–2	1–0	1–0	0–1	2–1	0–1	0–1	4–2	0–3
Dinamo Batumi	3–0		3–4	1–0	3–0	2–2	1–2	1–2	2–1	0–3	3–1	1–1
Dinamo Tbilisi	2–0	2–0		2–0	3–0	3–2	0–1	4–0	9–0	0–3	4–1	4–0
Gorda Rustavi	3–0	3–1	1–2		0–0	1–0	0–1	2–2	1–2	1–1	1–1	0–0
Iberia Samtredia	0–1	0–5	0–5	0–0		1–2	0–1	0–2	0–2	0–3	0–0	0–3
Kolkheti-1913 Poti	1–0	1–0	0–0	0–0	2–0		0–0	0–0	1–0	1–0	2–4	1–1
Locomotive Tbilisi	5–0	1–0	3–0	6–0	3–1	2–1		2–0	1–0	0–1	2–0	2–0
Merani-91 Tbilisi	0–0	1–1	2–2	2–0	3–1	1–0	0–1		0–0	0–0	1–0	2–2
Sioni Bolnisi	2–0	1–1	1–2	2–0	1–0	0–4	1–2	0–1		1–1	0–1	1–1
Torpedo Kutaisi	5–0	2–0	0–1	2–0	2–0	2–1	0–0	2–1	1–0		2–0	1–1
TSU Armazi Tbilisi	3–1	1–2	0–1	2–1	1–0	0–0	1–5	0–1	0–0	0–1		1–4
WIT Georgia	3–0	1–0	1–0	0–0	4–0	0–1	1–0	1–0	0–1	0–0	2–0	

Source: rsssf.org
Legend: Blue = home team win; Yellow = draw; Red = away team win.

== Second stage ==
=== Championship group ===
==== Table ====
Pos	Team	Pld	W	D	L	GF	GA	GD	Pts	Qualification
1	Torpedo Kutaisi (C)	10	6	2	2	15	7	+8	44	Qualification for the Champions League first qualifying round
2	Locomotive Tbilisi	10	3	4	3	8	9	−1	41	Qualification for the UEFA Cup qualifying round
3	Dinamo Tbilisi	10	3	5	2	13	9	+4	38	Qualification for the UEFA Cup qualifying round
4	WIT Georgia	10	4	4	2	14	9	+5	35	Qualification for the Intertoto Cup first round
5	Kolkheti-1913 Poti	10	2	2	6	10	19	−9	24	
6	Merani-91 Tbilisi (Note: Merani were docked 3 points due to match fixing accusations for the match against Kolkheti.)	10	1	3	6	2	15	−13	19	

Source: rsssf.org
Rules for classification: 1st points; 2nd matches won; 3rd head-to-head
(C) Champions

==== Results ====
Home \ Away	DIN	KOL	LOC	MER	TKU	WIT
Dinamo Tbilisi		2–1	0–1	4–0	1–1	2–2
Kolkheti-1913 Poti	1–2		2–0	0–0	0–1	2–1
Locomotive Tbilisi	2–2	2–2		0–0	1–0	2–0
Merani-91 Tbilisi	1–0	– (Note: The match between Merani and Kolkheti was originally finished with the score of 2–4 for Kolkheti, but were both teams awarded a 0–3 loss following a match fixing accusations.)	0–1		0–0	1–3
Torpedo Kutaisi	1–0	5–1	2–0	3–0		1–1
WIT Georgia	0–0	3–1	0–0	1–0	3–0	

Source: rsssf.org
Legend: Blue = home team win; Yellow = draw; Red = away team win.

=== Relegation group ===
==== Table ====
Pos	Team	Pld	W	D	L	GF	GA	GD	Pts	Qualification or relegation
7	Dinamo Batumi	10	5	3	2	13	7	+6	32	
8	Sioni Bolnisi (Note: Sioni were docked 3 points due to match fixing accusations for the match against Gorda.)	10	5	2	3	14	12	+2	27	
9	Gorda Rustavi	10	5	2	3	16	13	+3	26	
10	Dila Gori (R)	10	5	1	4	19	11	+8	25	Qualification to Relegation play-offs
11	TSU Armazi Tbilisi (R)	10	4	1	5	11	17	−6	23	Relegation to Pirveli Liga
12	Iberia Samtredia (R)	10	0	1	9	7	26	−19	3	Relegation to Pirveli Liga

Source: rsssf.org
Rules for classification: 1st points; 2nd matches won; 3rd head-to-head
(R) Relegated

==== Results ====
Home \ Away	DIL	DBA	GOR	IBS	SIO	TSU
Dila Gori		0–0	2–1	7–1	2–1	4–0
Dinamo Batumi	1–0		0–1	2–1	3–0	2–0
Gorda Rustavi	3–2	1–1		2–1	– (Note: The match between Gorda and Sioni was originally finished with the score of 3–2 for Gorda, but were both teams awarded a 0–3 loss following a match fixing accusations.)	4–0
Iberia Samtredia	1–2	0–3	0–3		2–2	1–2
Sioni Bolnisi	1–0	1–1	3–0	1–0		2–0
TSU Armazi Tbilisi	2–0	3–0	1–1	2–0	1–3	

Source: rsssf.org
Legend: Blue = home team win; Yellow = draw; Red = away team win.

== Relegation play-offs ==
27 May 2001

FC Dila Gori	0 – 2	Samgurali Tskaltubo

== Top goalscorers ==
Rank	Goalscorer	Team	Goals
1	(Georgia (country)) Zaza Zirakishvili	Dinamo Tbilisi	21
2	(Georgia (country)) Levan Melkadze	WIT Georgia	14
3	(Georgia (country)) Zurab Ionanidze	Torpedo Kutaisi	11
3	(Georgia (country)) Davit Goderdzishvili	Merani-91 Tbilisi	11
5	(Georgia (country)) Mamuka Rusia	Locomotive Tbilisi	10
5	(Georgia (country)) Shalva Isiani	Sioni Bolnisi	10
7	(Georgia (country)) Giorgi Shengelia	Locomotive Tbilisi	9
7	(Georgia (country)) Teimuraz Gadelia	Dinamo Tbilisi	9
7	(Georgia (country)) Giorgi Mikadze	Dinamo Tbilisi	9
7	(Georgia (country)) Gocha Kulejishvili	Dinamo Batumi	9

== See also ==
- 2000–01 Georgian Cup
