= Grigol Imedadze =

Georgian footballer

Personal information
- Date of birth: 2 May 1980 (age 46)
- Place of birth: Kutaisi, Georgian SSR, Soviet Union
- Height: 1.84 m (6 ft 1/2 in)
- Position: Striker

Senior career*
Years	Team	Apps	(Gls)
1996–1998	FC Torpedo-2 Kutaisi	21	(1)
1998–2001	FC Torpedo Kutaisi	52	(14)
2002	FC Alania Vladikavkaz	10	(2)
2003	Kocaelispor	7	(1)
2003	FC Tbilisi	2	(0)
2004	SC Tavriya Simferopol	10	(1)
2005–2007	FC Zestafoni	38	(9)
2007	FC Torpedo Kutaisi	10	(3)
2007–2008	FC Lokomotivi Tbilisi	11	(1)
2008–2009	FC Olimpi Rustavi	7	(1)
2009–2010	FC Torpedo-2008 Kutaisi		
2010–2011	Mash'al Mubarek	11	(3)
2011	FC Samtredia	4	(0)
- * Club domestic league appearances and goals

Grigol 'Gia' Imedadze (born 2 May 1980) is a Georgian former professional football player.
