= Jaba Dvali =

Georgian football player (1985–2026)

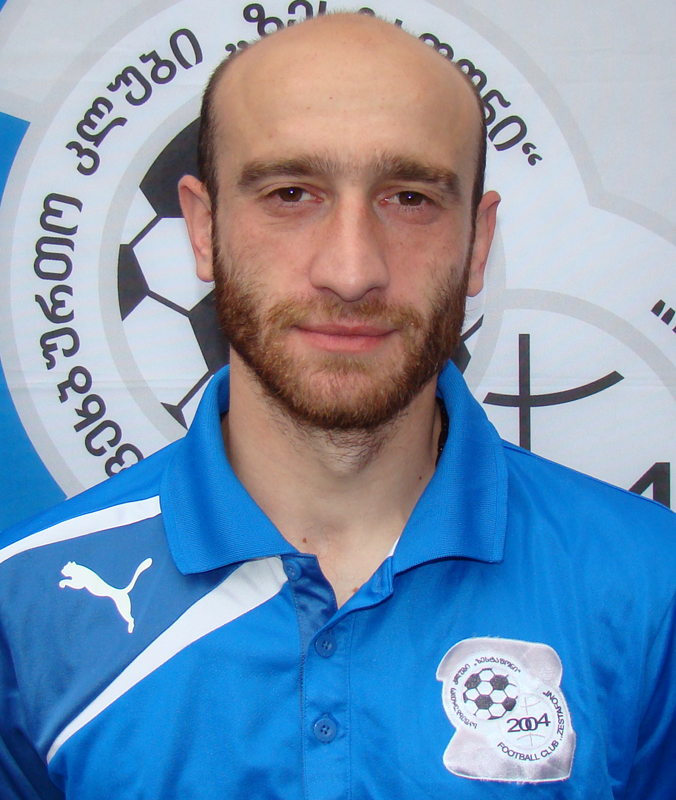
- Dvali in 2014

Personal information
- Date of birth: 8 February 1985
- Place of birth: Tbilisi, Georgian SSR, Soviet Union
- Date of death: 3 June 2026 (aged 41)
- Height: 1.76 m (5 ft 9 in)
- Position: Forward

Youth career
- 2000–2001: Tbilisi
- 2001–2002: Norchi Dinamoeli
- 2002–2004: Dinamo Tbilisi

Senior career*
Years	Team	Apps	(Gls)
2004–2007	Dinamo Tbilisi	48	(23)
2005–2006	→ Sioni (loan)	15	(11)
2006–2007	→ Chikhura (loan)	11	(2)
2007	→ Olimpi Rustavi (loan)	2	(0)
2007–2009	Dacia Chişinău	48	(20)
2009–2012	Zestaponi	98	(45)
2012–2014	Dinamo Tbilisi	51	(27)
2014	→ Qarabağ (loan)	5	(0)
2014	Zestaponi	12	(10)
2014–2016	Dacia Chișinău	5	(1)
2015	→ Saburtalo (loan)	8	(2)
2016	→ Sapovnela (loan)	9	(0)
2016–2017	Tskhinvali	11	(7)
2017–2018	Sioni	48	(23)
2018	Telavi	9	(0)
2019	Chiatura		
2020	Zestaponi	13	(8)
2022	Vazisubani		

International career
2012	Georgia	1	(0)
- * Club domestic league appearances and goals

Jaba Dvali (Georgian: ჯაბა დვალი; 8 February 1985 – 3 June 2026) was a Georgian football player and manager.

Dvali played in three countries as a forward. He was the four-time winner of the national league and two-time winner of the Georgian Cup. Dvali was a main goalscorer at Zestaponi during their "golden time" when the club twice in a row won the national league. He was also a member of the 100 club of Georgian players with a hundred and more goals.

Twice, in 2005–06 and 2011–12, Dvali finished the Umaglesi Liga seasons as a topscorer.

== Career ==
Dvali started his professional career at Dinamo Tbilisi. After being loaned to three clubs, he moved to Moldovan side Dacia Chișinău.

He spent three prolific seasons at Zestaponi during the height of their success in the early 2010s. Dvali personally played a vital role in the club. He became a top goalscorer of the league in 2011–12.

In 2012, Dvali made his only appearance for the Georgia national team in a home friendly game against Egypt.

While at Dinamo Tbilisi, Dvali scored his 100th goal in the top division against Torpedo Kutaisi on 4 May 2013, entering the topscorers' club.

In January 2014, Dvali agreed to join Azerbaijan Premier League side FK Qarabağ on a six-month loan deal. In June 2014, at the end of Dvali's loan deal with Qarabağ, he signed a two-year contract with Zestaponi in Georgia. In December 2014, Dvali signed two-year contract with Dacia Chișinău which came into force on 20 January 2015.

Between 2015 and 2019 Dvali played for five domestic clubs. Especially noteworthy during these short-term stints was his great contribution to Sioni's promotion to the Erovnuli Liga, including in a 3–2 play-off victory over Dinamo Batumi where Dvali scored a hat-trick.

In March 2020, Dvali returned to football after a year-long pause as director general of Zestaponi. At one point in 2021, when this fourth-tier club was plagued with injuries and suspensions, he appeared in the starting line-up and even scored from the penalty spot.

Along with the management at the club, Dvali also took charge of the Zestaponi youth academy.

On 22 October 2025, 40-year-old Dvali scored the last goal of his career as Zestaponi secured an away win over Gagra-2 before their relegation from Liga 4.

== Death ==
Dvali died following a heart attack on 3 June 2026, at the age of 41.

== Career statistics ==
As of 7 April 2014

Appearances and goals by club, season and competition
Club	Season	League			National cup		Super cup		Continental		Total	
Club	Season	Division	Apps	Goals	Apps	Goals	Apps	Goals	Apps	Goals	Apps	Goals
Dinamo Tbilisi	2004–05	Umaglesi Liga	23	9			–		3	0	26	9
Dinamo Tbilisi	2005–06	Umaglesi Liga	12	10			–		–		12	10
Dinamo Tbilisi	2006–07	Umaglesi Liga	11	3			–				11	3
Dinamo Tbilisi	Total		46	22			0	0	3	0	49	22
Sioni Bolnisi (loan)	2005–06	Umaglesi Liga	15	11			–		–		15	11
Chikhura Sachkhere (loan)	2006–07	Umaglesi Liga	11	2			–		–		11	2
Olimpi Rustavi (loan)	2007–08	Umaglesi Liga	2	0			–		2	0	4	0
Dacia Chișinău	2007–08	Moldovan National Division	32	13			–				32	13
Dacia Chișinău	2008–09	Moldovan National Division	16	7			–		2	0	18	7
Dacia Chișinău	Total		48	20			0	0	2	0	50	20
Zestaponi	2009–10	Umaglesi Liga	33	12	3	2	–		3	4	39	18
Zestaponi	2010–11	Umaglesi Liga	34	12	4	1	–		6	4	44	17
Zestaponi	2011–12	Umaglesi Liga	31	20	7	4	–		6	3	44	27
Zestaponi	2012–13	Umaglesi Liga	0	0	0	0	0	0	2	1	2	1
Zestaponi	Total		98	44	14	7	0	0	17	12	129	63
Dinamo Tbilisi	2012–13	Umaglesi Liga	27	20	9	2	–		–		36	22
Dinamo Tbilisi	2013–14	Umaglesi Liga	17	5	1	0	1	0	5	2	24	7
Dinamo Tbilisi	Total		44	25	10	2	1	0	5	2	60	29
Qarabağ (loan)	2013–14	Azerbaijan Premier League	5	0	0	0	–		–		5	0
Career total			269	124	24	9	1	0	29	14	323	147

== Honours ==
Dinamo Tbilisi

- Umaglesi Liga: 2004–05, 2012–13
- Georgian Cup: 2003–04
- Georgian Super Cup runner-up: 2013–14

Zestaponi

- Umaglesi Liga: 2010–11, 2011–12
- Georgian Cup: 2012–13; runner-up 2011–12
- Georgian Super Cup: 2011–12

Dacia Chișinău

- Moldovan National Division runner-up: 2007–08, 2008–09
- Moldovan Cup runner-up: 2008–09

Qarabağ

- Azerbaijan Premier League: 2013–14

Individual

- Umaglesi Liga top scorer: 2005–06 (21 goals), 2011–12 (20 goals)
- Author of first UEFA Europa League hat-trick
