= Suliko Davitashvili =

Georgian footballer

Personal information
- Date of birth: 11 December 1977 (age 48)
- Place of birth: Tbilisi, Georgian SSR, Soviet Union
- Position: Forward

Senior career*
| Years | Team | Apps | (Gls) |
| 1996–2000 | Merani-91 | 100 | (33) |
| 2000 | Sioni | 9 | (1) |
| 2001–2002 | Locomotive | 21 | (11) |
| 2002 | Merani-91 | 18 | (9) |
| 2002 | Merani-Olimpi | 8 | (5) |
| 2003 | Locomotive | 8 | (2) |
| 2003 | Merani-Olimpi | 19 | (13) |
| 2004 | Torpedo | 8 | (7) |
| 2004–2008 | Ameri | 72 | (20) |
| 2008–2010 | Sioni | 23 | (0) |

Managerial career
- 2014–2015: Dinamo Tbilisi (assistant manager)
- 2018–2019: Locomotive U19
- 2020: Rustavi
- * Club domestic league appearances and goals

Suliko Davitashvili (Georgian: სულიკო დავითაშვილი; born 11 December 1977) is a retired Georgian football player and manager.

Being the three-time national cup winner and two-time top scorer of the Umaglesi Liga, Davitashvili spent his entire career in Georgia. He is also a member of the 100 club comprising the players with a hundred or more goals.

== Playing career ==
Davitashvili started his career at now defunct club Merani-91 in 1996. During four seasons, he took part in 100 league matches, scoring 33 times. His first professional goal came on 5 August 1996 against Kolkheti 1913. A year later, Davitashvili netted his first European goal against Maltese club Floriana in a 5–0 home win.

In 2000, Davitashvili moved to Locomotive. He gave his team the lead against Torpedo Kutaisi in the final of the 2001-02 Georgian Cup tournament to win the first title of his career. Davitashvili shone in the league as well, finishing the season as a topscorer with 18 goals. Two years later, he topped the goalscoring chart again. This time he accrued twenty goals, including seven scored in eight appearances for Torpedo.

In 2004, Davitashvili joined 2nd division club Ameri and helped them gain promotion to the top flight. Over next two years, he won two more cup titles with Ameri. Davitashvili added two more European goals to his tally, first against Bundesliga club Hertha in a 2–2 draw in 2006, followed by another in a 2–0 win over Polish side GKS Bełchatów a year later.

On 17 August 2007, Davitashvili notched a goal in a 3–2 win over Dila to enter the 100 club as its 14th member. In September 2009, as a Sioni player, he took part in his last league match against WIT Georgia before retirement.

Davitashvili holds the record of scoring three times in the cup finals, each time for a different team. He racked up 101 goals in 286 Umaglesi Liga appearances.

== Managerial career ==
Shortly after his retirement, Davitashvili took charge of the U12 team at Dinamo Tbilisi. He was also assistant coach at the senior team under Kakha Gogichaishvili, at one point assuming the functions of head coach.

In 2019, he was appointed as a U19 coach at Locomotive before taking over 2nd division club Rustavi a year later.

== Personal life ==
Suliko Davitashvili is the father of Georgian international player Zuriko Davitashvili. He also has a younger son and a daughter.

== Honours ==
Locomotive

- Georgian Cup: 2001–02

Ameri

- Georgian Cup: 2005–06, 2006–07

Individual

- Umaglesi Liga top scorer: 2001–02, 2003–04
