= Giorgi Megreladze =

Georgian footballer

Personal information
- Full name: Giorgi Megreladze
- Date of birth: 21 July 1978 (age 48)
- Place of birth: Kutaisi, Soviet Union
- Height: 1.80 m (5 ft 11 in)
- Position: Forward

Senior career*
Years	Team	Apps	(Gls)
1993–1994	FC Samgurali Tskaltubo	12	(5)
1994	FC Mertskhali Ozurgeti	7	(0)
1995–2000	FC Torpedo Kutaisi	124	(54)
2000–2001	ILTEX Lykoi F.C.		
2002–2003	A.O. Patraikos		
2003	FC Neftekhimik Nizhnekamsk	16	(1)
2004–2005	FC Torpedo Kutaisi	34	(23)
2005–2006	FC Dinamo Tbilisi	22	(14)
2006–2007	FK Baku	6	(0)
2007	FC Zhetysu	8	(0)
2007–2008	FC Borjomi	6	(5)
2008–2009	FC Olimpi Rustavi	21	(8)
2009–2010	FC Shurtan Guzar	12	(3)
2010–2011	FC Zugdidi	8	(6)
2011–2012	FC Torpedo Kutaisi	26	(10)
2012	FC Mertskhali Ozurgeti		
2012–2013	FC Shurtan Guzar	0	(0)
2013	FC Merani Martvili	1	(0)

International career
1998	Georgia	1	(0)
- * Club domestic league appearances and goals

Giorgi Megreladze (born 21 July 1978) is a retired Georgian footballer, the son of former Georgian football player and Torpedo Kutaisi star Merab Megreladze.

Megreladze has played in six countries. He is the Georgian league winner with Torpedo and three-time team topscorer.

== Career ==
Megreladze started his career at Samgurali, making his Umaglesi Liga debut at the age of 15 against Batumi on 6 December 1993.

In 1995, Megreladze moved to Torpedo where he won the Umaglesi Liga five years later. During his three spells with Torpedo, Megreladze finished as the team goalscorer three times and accrued 80 goals in 184 league appearances combined.

At the start of the 2006–07 season Megreladze signed up to play for FK Baku.

On 21 March 2008, Megreladze scored for Borjomi against Ameri to become the 15th member of the 100 club. He also played, among other clubs, for Dinamo Tbilisi.

With the Georgia national football team Megreladze won only one game, on 12 August 1998 against Azerbaijan. In 2009, he scored the first ever UEFA Europa League goal.

== Personal life ==
Giorgi Megreladze is the fourth member of the Megreladze football family. His son Merab also played in the top division before taking up managerial roles.

In 2024, Megreladze revealed in an interview that he had formed a youth football club called Georgia Philly in the United States.
