= Davit Janashia =

Georgian head coach and footballer (born 1972)

Personal information
- Full name: Davit Janashia
- Date of birth: 8 July 1972 (age 54)
- Place of birth: Kutaisi, Soviet Union
- Position: Forward

Senior career*
Years	Team	Apps	(Gls)
1989–1993	Torpedo Kutaisi	113	(44)
1993–1995	Samtredia	66	(33)
1996	Zhemchuzhina Sochi	31	(1)
1997	Chernomorets Novorossiysk	3	(0)
1997–2001	Torpedo Kutaisi	95	(41)
2001	Lokomotiv Tbilisi	7	(0)
2002	Dinamo Batumi	13	(2)
2002	Torpedo Kutaisi	6	(0)
2002–2003	Samgurali Tsqaltubo	9	(1)
2003	Atyrau	6	(2)
2004	Zestaponi	5	(1)
2005	Borjomi	10	(0)
2005–2007	Torpedo Kutaisi	15	(3)

International career
1992–1999	Georgia	10	(3)

Managerial career
- 2007: Torpedo Kutaisi
- * Club domestic league appearances and goals

Davit Janashia (born 8 July 1972 in Kutaisi) is a Georgian head coach and former footballer.

== Career ==
Janashia started his career at hometown club Torpedo Kutaisi, he then moved to Samtredia in 1993, where he met name sake Zaza Janashia in the next season.

Janashia moved to the Russian (North Caucasus) side Zhemchuzhina Sochi in 1996. He then played for Chernomorets Novorossiysk but failed to play regularly. He moved back from his neighboring country and re-signed for Torpedo Kutaisi, where he won two Umaglesi Liga titles.

Janashia was signed for Dinamo Batumi in January 2002, after failed to play regular football at Lokomotiv Tbilisi. He rejoined hometown club Torpedo Kutaisi at the start of the 2002–03 season but was fired again in September. He was then signed by Samgurali Tsqaltubo of Pirveli Liga, before moved to Kazakhstani side Atyrau.

=== International career ===
Janashia made his Georgia debut on 2 September 1992 against Lithuania. In total, Janashia capped 8 times for Georgia, 6 in friendlies, one in UEFA Euro 1996 qualifying and one in UEFA Euro 2000 qualifying. In addition, Janashia was capped twice in non-A friendlies against Azerbaijan in 1992 and 1993, which at that time Azerbaijan was not yet a member of UEFA nor FIFA.

== Coaching career ==
Janashia was appointed as coach of Torpedo Kutaisi in May 2007.

== Career statistics ==
=== International ===
Appearances and goals by national team and year
National team	Year	Apps	Goals
Georgia	1992	2	0
Georgia	1993	1	0
Georgia	1994	3	1
Georgia	1995	1	1
Georgia	1996	–	
Georgia	1997	–	
Georgia	1998	1	1
Georgia	1999	2	0
Total		10	3

Scores and results list Georgia's goal tally first, score column indicates score after each Janashia goal.

List of international goals scored by Davit Janashia
No.	Date	Venue	Opponent	Score	Result	Competition
1	26 June 1994	University of Latvia Stadium, Riga, Latvia	Latvia	1–0	3–1	Friendly
2	15 November 1995	Republican Stadium, Chișinău, Moldova	Moldova	1–2	2–3	UEFA Euro 1996 qualification
3	18 November 1998	Boris Paichadze National Stadium, Tbilisi, Georgia	Estonia	2–0	3–1	Friendly

== Personal ==
He is the brother of Kakhaber Janashia.
