= Zaza Zirakishvili =

Georgian footballer

Personal information
- Full name: Robert Zirakishvili
- Date of birth: 13 March 1975 (age 51)
- Position: Forward

Senior career*
Years	Team	Apps	(Gls)
1991–1992	Mretebi Tbilisi	11	(0)
1992–1993	Dinamo Tbilisi	0	(0)
1993–1994	Merani Tbilisi	26	(20)
1994–1997	Metalurgi Rustavi	47	(23)
1997	→ Farense (loan)	3	(1)
1997	Dinamo Batumi	8	(3)
1998	WIT Georgia	3	(0)
1998–1999	Arsenali Tbilisi	20	(12)
1998–2002	Dinamo Tbilisi	47	(27)
2002–2003	Torpedo Kutaisi	11	(4)
2003–2004	Locomotive Tbilisi	1	(0)
2004–2005	FC Zestaponi	18	(10)
2005	FC Tbilisi	7	(1)
2006	Dinamo Batumi	11	(4)
2006–2007	FC Norchi Dinamo Tbilisi	1	(0)
- * Club domestic league appearances and goals

Robert "Zaza" Zirakishvili (born 13 March 1975) is a Georgian former professional who played as a forward. He became top goalscorer of the Erovnuli Liga in 2000–01 and also spent brief time in Portugal and Azerbaijan.
