= Merab Megreladze =

Georgian footballer

Personal information
- Date of birth: 26 January 1956
- Place of birth: Ozurgeti, Georgian SSR
- Date of death: 24 January 2012 (aged 55)
- Place of death: Kutaisi, Georgia
- Height: 1.76 m (5 ft 9 1/2 in)
- Position: Forward

Youth career
- Mertskhali

Senior career*
Years	Team	Apps	(Gls)
1977–1981	Guria	188	(88)
1982–1986	Torpedo Kutaisi	153	(53)
1987	Guria	20	(1)
1987–1990	Torpedo Kutaisi	72	(61)
1990	IFK Holmsund	19	(3)
1991–1992	Guria	38	(9)
1992–1993	Samgurali	31	(41)
1993–1994	Margveti	31	(31)
1994–1995	Torpedo Kutaisi	13	(5)
1995–1996	Samgurali	38	(31)
1996–1997	Torpedo Kutaisi	22	(13)
1998–1999	Chkalovets Novosibirsk	40	(7)
Total		665	(343)
- * Club domestic league appearances and goals

Merab Megreladze (26 January 1956 – 24 January 2012) was a Georgian football player.

Megreladze belongs to a football dynasty which stretches from his grandfather up to his grandson. He is the two-time most prolific striker of the Georgian top league as well as its all-time record topscorer with 41 goals netted in a single season.

Megreladze is regarded as a Georgian football legend.

== Career ==
A product of Makharadze's youth sport school, Megreladze started taking first steps at his hometown team Mertskhali, representing it in the Soviet Second League at age 17. His professional career began at Guria in 1977. Two years later, Megreladze scored 31 goals in 46 games to become the league topscorer and greatly contributed to Guria's first ever promotion to the 2nd division. During this five-year period, he scored 88 goals in 188 games.

In early 1982, Megreladze joined Torpedo Kutaisi who had just gained promotion to the Soviet Top League. He spent five successive seasons at this club, including four years in the top flight. During his first season, Megreladze netted 18 times and finished as runner-up among the league topscorers behind Pakhtakor's Andrei Yakubik.

On 8 July 1985, Megreladze shone in a 3–1 away win over Dinamo Moscow, scoring a hat-trick. With Torpedo relegated the next year, he moved to Guria only to return to Kutaisi in 1988. Overall, between 1982 and 1998, Megreladze had four spells at Torpedo. When the team took part in a Soviet league for the last time in 1989 before nearly all Georgian teams withdrew, Megreladze netted 29 goals in the 2nd division, taking the second place among the league topscorers.

He returned to Guria in 1991 again playing in the recently formed Georgian Umaglesi Liga. In 1992, he moved to Samgurali where in his only season, he scored 41 goals in just 31 games at the age of 37, making him the top scorer in Europe for the season, although wasn't officially recognized as such. It remains a Georgian league record. In 1993, Megreladze joined Margveti where he was the league's top scorer again with 31 goals in 31 games. In total, he scored 104 goals in 140 matches in the Umaglesi Liga and 343 goals in 665 games in all competitions.

Megreladze kept scoring at 41 when he netted 13 goals during his final season for Torpedo. He announced retirement in 1999.

== Death and memory ==
Megreladze suddenly died on 24 January 2012, at age 55.

The Imereti regional football federation regularly organizes a tournament named after Merab Megreladze among U11 teams.

== Personal life ==
Merab's grandfather and father, Ilia and Nodar, both played for Mertskhali as strikers. His son Giorgi, born in 1978, joined the list of footballers with 100 and more Umaglesi/Erovnuli Liga goals in 2008. Therefore, this is the only family with two members in the club.

In the mid-1990s, for a year and a half Merab and his son were members of Torpedo Kutaisi at the same time.

Merab the junior, born 1999, also tried to continue his grandfather's steps in Torpedo and Samgurali. In 2022, he bagged a brace for Zana to help the team advance to the third round of the Georgian Cup.

== Honours ==
=== Club ===
Guria

- Umaglesi Liga vice-champion: 1991
- Soviet Second League winner: 1979 (4th group)
- Soviet Second League vice-champion: 1978 (4th group)

Margveti

- Umaglesi Liga third place: 1993–94

=== Individual ===
- Umaglesi Liga topscorer: 1992–93, 1993–94
- All-time Umaglesi Liga topscorer: 41 goals
