= 1993–94 Umaglesi Liga =

Umaglesi Liga
- Season: 1993–94
- Dates: 8 August 1993 – 18 June 1994
- Champions: Dinamo Tbilisi; 5th Georgian title
- Relegated: Alazani Gurjaani; Shukura Kobuleti; Magharoeli Chiatura; Mretebi Tbilisi
- UEFA Cup: Dinamo Tbilisi
- Matches played: 328
- Goals scored: 1,200 (3.66 per match)
- Top goalscorer: Merab Megreladze (31)
- Biggest home win: Metalurgi 8–0 Magharoeli Chiatura
- Biggest away win: Kakheti 1–7 Metalurgi
- Highest scoring: Odishi 9–3 Magharoeli Chiatura

The 1993–94 Umaglesi Liga was the fifth season of top-tier football in Georgia. It began on 8 August 1993 and ended on 18 June 1994. Dinamo Tbilisi were the defending champions.

== Locations ==
Location of teams in 1993–94 Umaglesi Liga

== Preliminary stage ==
=== Eastern Group ===
Pos	Team	Pld	W	D	L	GF	GA	GD	Pts	Qualification
1	Dinamo Tbilisi	20	15	1	4	79	29	+50	46	Qualification to Championship group
2	Shevardeni-1906 Tbilisi	20	13	1	6	44	27	+17	40	Qualification to Championship group
3	Margveti Zestaponi	20	11	4	5	49	27	+22	37	Qualification to Championship group
4	Dila Gori	20	11	2	7	34	32	+2	35	Qualification to Championship group
5	Iveria Khashuri	20	10	5	5	38	30	+8	35	Qualification to Championship group
6	Sapovnela Terjola	20	10	3	7	36	23	+13	33	Qualification to Relegation group
7	Magharoeli Chiatura	20	7	4	9	29	39	−10	25	Qualification to Relegation group
8	Alazani Gurjaani	20	6	5	9	29	46	−17	23	Qualification to Relegation group
9	Metalurgi Rustavi	20	5	1	14	32	46	−14	16	Qualification to Relegation group
10	Kakheti Telavi	20	4	3	13	25	57	−32	15	Qualification to Relegation group
11	Mretebi Tbilisi	20	3	1	16	17	56	−39	10	Qualification to Relegation group

Source: rsssf.org
Rules for classification: 1st points; 2nd matches won; 3rd head-to-head

==== Results ====
Home \ Away	ALA	DIL	DIN	IKH	KTL	MAG	MZS	MET	MRE	SAP	SHE
Alazani Gurjaani		1–4	1–6	0–0	2–2	5–0	3–3	0–3 (Note: Match awarded.)	1–0	2–2	2–7
Dila Gori	1–0		1–4	2–1	3–2	2–0	3–1	2–1	5–1	3–2	2–1
Dinamo Tbilisi	1–2	7–2		3–3	8–2	7–2	4–0	5–3	6–2	1–2	7–1
Iveria Khashuri	7–3	1–1	0–2		1–1	2–0	2–1	3–1	3–1	1–0	2–0
Kakheti Telavi	0–1	2–1	0–5	1–4		1–1	0–5	1–7	3–1	2–0	4–1
Magharoeli Chiatura	3–0	0–0	1–6	1–1	2–0		2–0	3–1	3–0	0–0	1–3
Margveti Zestaponi	2–1	1–0	2–0	4–0	3–0	6–2		3–0	7–0	3–1	1–0
Metalurgi Rustavi	1–2	1–2	1–2	1–3	3–2	0–4	1–1		1–2	4–1	0–1
Mretebi Tbilisi	1–3	1–0	1–4	1–3	2–1	1–4	2–2	0–2		0–1	1–2
Sapovnela Terjola	0–0	4–0	0–1	5–1	3–0	1–0	4–2	3–0	4–0		3–0
Shevardeni-1906 Tbilisi	3–0	1–0	3–0	2–0	4–1	3–0	2–2	6–1	1–0	3–0	

Source: globalsportsarchive.com
Legend: Blue = home team win; Yellow = draw; Red = away team win.

=== Western Group ===
Pos	Team	Pld	W	D	L	GF	GA	GD	Pts	Qualification
1	Kolkheti-1913 Poti	14	9	2	3	36	21	+15	29	Qualification to Championship group
2	Guria Lanchkhuti	14	9	0	5	36	22	+14	27	Qualification to Championship group
3	FC Batumi	14	8	1	5	31	22	+9	25	Qualification to Championship group
4	Samtredia	14	7	2	5	29	23	+6	23	Qualification to Championship group
5	Torpedo Kutaisi	14	6	3	5	23	27	−4	21	Qualification to Championship group
6	Shukura Kobuleti	14	6	2	6	26	28	−2	20	Qualification to Relegation group
7	Odishi Zugdidi	14	4	1	9	29	37	−8	13	Qualification to Relegation group
8	Samgurali Tskaltubo	14	1	1	12	12	42	−30	4	Qualification to Relegation group

Source: rsssf.org
Rules for classification: 1st points; 2nd matches won; 3rd head-to-head

==== Results ====
Home \ Away	BAT	GUR	KOL	ODI	SMG	SAM	SHU	TKU
Batumi		4–1	1–1	2–1	5–0	3–2	3–0	0–2
Guria Lanchkhuti	2–0		2–1	4–1	6–2	6–1	1–0	4–0
Kolkheti-1913 Poti	5–2	2–1		3–2	2–0	2–2	3–4	7–2
Odishi Zugdidi	3–4	3–4	1–2		3–0 (Note: Match awarded.)	1–5	3–0	4–4
Samgurali Tskaltubo	1–4	1–3	1–2	2–3		2–1	1–1	1–2
Samtredia	1–0	3–0	1–3	2–0	4–0		3–2	2–1
Shukura Kobuleti	2–1	3–2	1–3	4–2	4–0	2–1		2–4
Torpedo Kutaisi	1–2	1–0	1–0	1–2	2–1	1–1	1–1	

Source: globalsportsarchive.com
Legend: Blue = home team win; Yellow = draw; Red = away team win.

== Final stage ==
=== Championship group ===
Pos	Team	Pld	W	D	L	GF	GA	GD	Pts	Qualification
1	Dinamo Tbilisi (C)	18	16	0	2	51	16	+35	48	Qualification for the UEFA Cup preliminary round
2	Kolkheti-1913 Poti	18	14	2	2	51	20	+31	44	
3	Torpedo Kutaisi	18	9	4	5	33	22	+11	31	
4	Samtredia	18	9	2	7	31	23	+8	29	
5	FC Batumi	18	8	4	6	32	24	+8	28	
6	Shevardeni-1906 Tbilisi	18	6	3	9	28	26	+2	21	
7	Guria Lanchkhuti	18	5	2	11	30	50	−20	17	
8	Margveti Zestaponi	18	4	3	11	22	41	−19	15	
9	Dila Gori	18	4	2	12	12	35	−23	14	
10	Iveria Khashuri	18	3	2	13	14	47	−33	11	

Source: rsssf.org
Rules for classification: 1st points; 2nd matches won; 3rd head-to-head
(C) Champions

==== Results ====
Home \ Away	BAT	DIL	DIN	GUR	IKH	KOL	MZS	SAM	SHE	TKU
Batumi		3–0	2–3	5–1	0–0	1–1	0–0	1–0	2–0	5–2
Dila Gori	2–1		0–3	1–1	2–1	0–1	1–1	0–3	2–1	0–2
Dinamo Tbilisi	3–0	2–0		5–0	7–0	4–1	5–2	2–0	2–1	3–1
Guria Lanchkhuti	2–4	3–1	2–3		4–2	2–5	2–1	3–0	3–3	4–3
Iveria Khashuri	0–2	0–2	1–2	1–0		2–4	2–0	1–1	0–3 (Note: Match awarded.)	1–3
Kolkheti-1913 Poti	2–1	3–0	5–1	4–0	6–0		5–2	5–1	2–1	3–1
Margveti Zestaponi	4–2	2–1	0–3	4–2	3–0	0–1		0–3	1–1	0–3
Samtredia	2–0	3–0	0–1	3–0	4–1	1–2	3–2		2–0	2–2
Shevardeni-1906 Tbilisi	1–2	3–0	0–2	3–0	1–2	3–1	3–0	3–2		0–0
Torpedo Kutaisi	1–1	2–0	1–0	2–1	3–0	0–0	4–0	0–1	3–1	

Source: globalsportsarchive.com
Legend: Blue = home team win; Yellow = draw; Red = away team win.

=== Relegation group ===
Pos	Team	Pld	W	D	L	GF	GA	GD	Pts	Relegation
11	Metalurgi Rustavi	16	10	0	6	43	19	+24	30	
12	Odishi Zugdidi	16	9	2	5	38	19	+19	29	
13	Sapovnela Terjola	16	9	2	5	28	23	+5	29	
14	Samgurali Tskaltubo	16	9	1	6	27	29	−2	28 (Note: Head-to-head record: Samgurali Tskaltubo–Kakheti Telavi 3–1, Kakheti Telavi–Samgurali Tskaltubo 1–2.)	
15	Kakheti Telavi	16	9	1	6	45	32	+13	28	
16	Alazani Gurjaani (R)	16	8	3	5	25	25	0	27	Relegation to Pirveli Liga
17	Shukura Kobuleti (R)	16	7	1	8	18	29	−11	22	Relegation to Pirveli Liga
18	Magharoeli Chiatura (R)	16	4	2	10	27	47	−20	14	Relegation to Pirveli Liga
19	Mretebi Tbilisi (R)	16	0	2	14	11	39	−28	2	Relegation to Pirveli Liga

Source: rsssf.org
Rules for classification: 1st points; 2nd matches won; 3rd head-to-head
(R) Relegated

==== Results ====
Home \ Away	ALA	KTL	MAG	MET	MRE	ODI	SAP	SMG	SHU
Alazani Gurjaani		2–3	3–1	1–6	3–2	1–0	1–1	3–0	2–1
Kakheti Telavi	3–0		7–3	1–2	2–1	3–0	7–4	1–2	6–3
Magharoeli Chiatura	3–5	3–3		0–1	3–1	0–1	0–2	1–1	3–0
Metalurgi Rustavi	0–2	2–4	8–0		4–0	4–1	2–0	5–3	5–0
Mretebi Tbilisi	1–1	1–3	1–3	0–2		1–6	3–3	0–1	0–1
Odishi Zugdidi	0–0	3–0	9–3	3–1	3–0		3–0	5–1	3–1
Sapovnela Terjola	0–1	2–1	2–1	2–1	2–0	1–0		5–1	2–1
Samgurali Tskaltubo	3–0	3–1	2–3	1–0	1–0	2–0	1–0		3–2
Shukura Kobuleti	1–0	1–0	1–0	1–0	1–0	1–1	0–2	3–2	

Source: globalsportsarchive.com
Legend: Blue = home team win; Yellow = draw; Red = away team win.

== Top goalscorers ==
Rank	Goalscorer	Team	Goals
1	(Georgia (country)) Merab Megreladze	Margveti Zestaponi	31
2	(Georgia (country)) Varlam Kilasonia	Metalurgi Rustavi	25
3	(Georgia (country)) Givi Kobelashvili	Iveria Khashuri	21
4	(Georgia (country)) Davit Makharadze	Kolkheti-1913 Poti	20
5	(Georgia (country)) Aleksandr Iashvili	Dinamo Tbilisi	19
5	(Georgia (country)) Mikheil Kavelashvili	Dinamo Tbilisi	19

== See also ==
- 1993–94 Pirveli Liga
- 1993–94 Georgian Cup
