= FC Sapovnela Terjola =

- Founded: 1990
- Ground: Sapovnela Stadion; Terjola, Georgia
- Capacity: 1,000
- Owner: Mamuli Kovziridze
- Head Coach: Ramaz Gurabanidze
- League: Regionuli Liga C Group
- 2025: 4th of 16
Home colours	Away colours

FC Sapovnela (Georgian: საფეხბურთო კლუბი საპოვნელა) is a Georgian association football club from the town of Terjola. They compete in Regionuli Liga, the fifth tier of the national football system.

Sapovnela was a municipal club, financially supported by the local municipality up until the 2016 season and by the Georgian Football Development Foundation during the next two years.

Overall, they have spent three seasons in the Umaglesi Liga, the Georgian top division.

== History ==
Sapovnela made a debut in the Pirveli Liga competition in 1990. After three seasons they came 3rd and gained promotion to Umaglesi Liga, where the club stayed for two years.

In 2013, Sapovnela finished in third place in Liga 3 and returned to Pirveli Liga with ambitious plans to advance further to the top flight. This goal was implemented the next season. Under head coach Mirian Getsadze the team sealed the title with seven matches to spare 23 points clear of their rivals. Striker Giorgi Bukhaidze became a top scorer of B Group with 16 goals.

Bukhaidze shined in the top league as well by scoring 15 of the overall 24 team goals. Sapovnela signed experienced field players Davit Odikadze, Aleksandre Koshkadze, Jaba Dvali and fought hard to stay up. Zviad Jeladze was appointed as a manager midway through this season following unsatisfactory results, but the club was inundated with problems. Since their home ground was announced unfit for hosting the league games, they hired pitches in neighboring cities such as Zestaponi and Kutaisi. Lacking financial resources and home supporters, Sapovnela were fined by the Federation with 5,000₾ for crowd disturbances, followed by 7,000 for verbal insults directed at referees and further 1,000 for setting off flares. The club was also ordered to hold one game behind closed doors. Besides, their officials made complaints about a biased approach from referees.

Had Sapovnela prevailed over Chikhura in a final dramatic match of this season, they might have avoided relegation, although after a 3–2 loss they ended up bottom of the table.

Likewise, a bitter survival battle lasted until the last day in Pirveli Liga the next year. Having lost a crunch game again, the team finished in the drop zone.

Their 2017 season in Liga 3 was dismal. With two wins in 36 games, Sapovnela showed the worst results among the participant clubs and suffered a third successive relegation.

Beset by financial difficulties, they were no longer able to take part in Regionuli Liga. In March 2018, they withdrew from the league. A year later the Kutaisi City Court declared Sapovnela bankrupt.

The club came back to life in early 2023 to try to claw its way back into the upper divisions from the basement, the Georgian regional league.

== Seasons ==
Season	League	Pos	MP	W	D	L	GF–GA	Pts
2012–13	Meore Liga West	3rd of 13↑	24	17	4	3	66–18	58
2013–14	Pirveli Liga Group A	5th of 13	24	12	5	7	40–25	41
2014–15	Pirveli Liga Group B	1st of 10↑	36	23	8	5	64–28	77
2015–16	Umaglesi Liga	16th of 16↓	30	5	6	19	24–63	21
2016	Pirveli Liga Red Group	7th of 9↓	16	5	4	7	14–18	19
2017	Liga 3 Red Group	10th of 10	18	1	6	11	7–31	9
2017	Relegation Round	10th of 10↓	18	1	3	14	9–52	6
The club was dissolved in 2018–2022
2023	Regionuli Liga C	12th of 13	24	2	1	21	23–139	7
2024	Regionuli Liga C	7th of 13	24	8	4	12	46–61	28
2025	Regionuli Liga C	4th of 16	26	22	0	4	106–44	66

== Honours ==
Pirveli Liga

Third place (2): 1992–93, 2015–16

Meore Liga

Winners (1): 2012–13

== Players ==
As of 12 Marth 2016

Note: Flags indicate national team as defined under FIFA eligibility rules; some limited exceptions apply. Players may hold more than one non-FIFA nationality.

No.	Pos.	Nation	Player
—	GK	GEO	Aleksandre Giorgadze
—	GK	GEO	Giorgi Somkhishvili
—	GK	GEO	Vazha Kakhatelidze
—	DF	GEO	Ushangi Bandzeladze
—	DF	GEO	Davit Beruashvili
—	DF	GEO	Lasha Chelidze
—	DF	GEO	Tengiz Chikviladze
—	DF	GEO	Zurab Endeladze
—	DF	GEO	Giorgi Narimanidze
—	MF	GEO	David Odikadze

No.	Pos.	Nation	Player
—	MF	GEO	David Bolkvadze
—	MF	GEO	Irakli Katamadze
—	MF	GEO	Aleko Koshkadze
—	MF	GEO	Giorgi Makaridze
—	MF	GEO	Levan Sharikadze
—	MF	GEO	Mikheil Vatcharadze
—	FW	GEO	Giorgi Bukhaidze
—	FW	GEO	Jaba Dvali
—	FW	GEO	Giorgi Mikaberidze
—	FW	GEO	Giorgi Tkeshelashvili
