= FC Samtredia =

- Full name: Football Club Samtredia
- Founded: 1936; 90 years ago as Sanavardo Samtredia
- Ground: Erosi Manjgaladze Stadium, Samtredia, Georgia
- Capacity: 3,000
- Chairman: Mikheil Khutsishvili
- Manager: Vladimer Kakashvili
- League: Erovnuli Liga 2
- 2025: 6th of 10
- Website: fcsamtredia.ge
Home colours	Away colours

FC Samtredia (Georgian: სკ სამტრედია), commonly known as Samtredia, is a Georgian professional football club based in the city of Samtredia. The club competes in Erovnuli Liga 2, the 2nd tier of Georgian football. Their home ground is the Erosi Manjgaladze Stadium.

In 2016, Samtredia won the league and the Super Cup.

== History ==
=== Soviet League Era ===
Established in 1936, Samtredia spent years in the Georgian SSR Championship before the club eventually obtained the right to participate in the Soviet Second League, the third tier of the Soviet football system. Lokomotivi Samtredia finished their season as runners-up several times and even won the league twice, although they eventually failed to win the knockout stages of the competition against winners of two other SSR Countries.

Season	League	Pos	Notes
1973	II, zone 4	12	
1974	II, zone 3	9	
1975	II, zone 1	10	
1976	II, zone 1	13	
1977	II, zone 4	12	
1978	II, zone 4	8	
1979	II, zone 4	2	
1980	II, zone 9	1	Play-off, lost
1981	II, zone 9	2	
1982	II, zone 9	2	
1983	II, zone 9	4	
1984	II, zone 9	4	
1985	II, zone 9	10	
1986	II, zone 9	7	
1987	II, zone 9	1	Play-offs, lost
1988	II, zone 3	8	
1989	II, zone 9	4	

Below are the all-time results during the 17 consecutive seasons in the Soviet Second League.

M	W	D	L	GF–GA
626	300	121	205	992-813

Following the 1989 season, the Samtredian team as well as all other Georgian clubs withdrew from their relevant Soviet leagues after the Georgian Football Federation broke ties with the Soviet Football Federation and formed an independent championship.

=== Early years after independence ===
Right after Georgia's independence, Sanavardo Samtredia became a member of the new national top tier, the Umaglesi Liga.

While twice, in 1993/94 and 1995/96, they finished in 4th, in 1994/1995 the club ended the season in 2nd which gave them qualification for the preliminary round of the UEFA Cup.

The debut in European competition turned out unsuccessful. Soon they fell from the top flight followed by relegation from Pirveli Liga as well.

=== Recent Times ===
In 2014/15 Samtredia reached the final of the David Kipiani Cup. In the previous rounds they had knocked out four opponents, including favourites Dinamo Batumi, Torpedo Kutaisi and Chikhura, but they weren't able to upset the odds again against Dinamo Tbilisi.

The most fruitful period for Samtredia was in the mid-2010s, when they finished amongst the top three teams of Umaglesi Liga for three consecutive seasons. Moreover, in 2016, under head coach Giorgi Tsetsadze, they became champions for the first time in their history after victory over Chikhura Sachkhere in the championship playoffs. Samtredia completed the season with the double after they beat Georgian Cup holders Torpedo Kutaisi in the Super Cup game.

In 2019, the club competed in Liga 2, although they returned to the Erovnuli Liga after one season. Manager Kakhaber Kacharava, who guided Samtredia back to the top flight, had to quit the club in September 2020 after just one point earned in their last five league games and a shock cup defeat from Liga 3 minnows Tbilisi City.

New head coach Giorgi Mikadze steered Samtredia away from the relegation zone, but in February 2021 he was replaced by Giorgi Tsetsadze, who had once brought the club to their only champion's title. His second tenure lasted eight months, though. The team lost the relegation struggle and finished bottom of the table.

Just like the previous case three years earlier, it took Samtredia a year to move back to the top flight. Under Giorgi Shashiashvili the team beat their rivals for a playoff spot and qualified for decisive matches for the third time in the last five years. Another victory over Sioni completed their successful league campaign in 2022.

Samtredia spent the next two seasons fighting for survival. In 2023, they cruised to a narrow play-off victory over Gareji, but a year later suffered a third relegation in seven years.

== Seasons ==
=== Domestic leagues ===
Season	Div	Pos	Top goalscorer	Goals	Cup
1990	1st	12_{/18}			Round of 32
1991	1st	18_{/20}			–
1991/92	1st	15_{/20}			Round of 16
1992/93	1st	10_{/17}			Round of 16
1993/94	1st	4_{/10}			Round of 16
1994/95	1st	2_{/16}	Gia Jishkariani	18	Quarterfinals
1995/96	1st	4_{/16}	Zurab Ionanidze	23	Semifinals
1996/97	1st	14_{/16↓}			Round of 16
1997/98	2nd	2_{/14}↑			Quarterfinals
1998/99	1st	8_{/16}			Round of 16
1999/2000	1st	7_{/8}			Round of 32
2000/01	1st	12_{/12}↓			Round of 32
2001/02	2nd	10_{/11}			Round of 32
2002/03	2nd	16_{/16}			Round of 32
2003/04	2nd	14_{/16}			Round of 32
2007/08	2nd	8_{/10}			1st Round
2008/09	2nd	1_{/11}↑			Round of 16
2009/10	1st	7_{/10}	(Georgia (country)) Zaur Khachiperadze	11	Round of 16
2010/11	1st	10_{/10}↓	(Georgia (country)) Giga Kverenchkhiladze	4	Round of 32
2011/12	2nd, A	3_{/8}	(Georgia (country)) Papuna Shatirishvili	3	Round of 32
2012/13	2nd	5_{/12}	(Georgia (country)) Zaur Khachiperadze	9	Round of 16
2013/14	2nd	1_{/14}↑	(Georgia (country)) Zviad Kantaria	11	Round of 32
2014/15	1st	6_{/16}	(Georgia (country)) Tornike Kapanadze	7	Runners-up
2015/16	1st	2_{/16}	(Georgia (country)) Budu Zivzivadze	16	Quarterfinals
2016	1st	1_{/14}	(Georgia (country)) Budu Zivzivadze	11	Quarterfinals
2017	1st	3_{/10}	(Georgia (country)) Davit Rajamashvili	8	Round of 16
2018	1st	9_{/10}↓	(Georgia (country)) Giorgi Pantsulaia	6	Round of 16
2019	2nd	2_{/10}↑	(Georgia (country)) Guram Samushia	15	Round of 16
2020	1st	7_{/10}	(Azerbaijan) Nijat Gurbanov	4	Round of 16
2021	1st	10_{/10}↓	(Croatia) Nikola Prelčec	4	Round of 32
2022	2nd	3_{/10}↑	(Georgia (country)) Dato Kirkitadze	8	Round of 32
2023	1st	9_{/10}	(Georgia (country)) Zurab Nachkebia (North Macedonia) Aleksandar Mishov	8	Round of 32
2024	1st	10_{/10}↓	(Georgia (country)) Daniel Owusu	5	Round of 16
2025	2nd	6_{/10}	(Georgia (country)) Levan Kutalia	9	Semifinals

=== European record ===
Season	Competition	Round	Club	Home	Away	Aggregate
1995–96	UEFA Cup	PR	(North Macedonia) FK Vardar	0–2	0–1	0–3
2016–17	UEFA Europa League	1QR	(Azerbaijan) Gabala	2–1	1–5	3–6
2017–18	UEFA Champions League	2QR	(Azerbaijan) Qarabag	0–1	0–5	0–6
2018–19	UEFA Europa League	1QR	(Kazakhstan) Tobol	0–1	0–2	0–3

== Current squad ==
As of 19 March 2026

Note: Flags indicate national team as defined under FIFA eligibility rules; some limited exceptions apply. Players may hold more than one non-FIFA nationality.

No.	Pos.	Nation	Player
2	DF	GEO	Giorgi Gvishiani
3	DF	GEO	Nikoloz Vibliani
4	DF	GEO	Levan Kaladze
6	MF	GBS	Helistano Manga
7	MF	GEO	Giuli Manjgaladze (captain)
8	MF	GEO	Davit Samurkasovi
9	FW	GEO	Tamaz Makatsaria
10	FW	CRC	Julen Cordero
11	FW	GEO	Teimuraz Odikadze
12	GK	LAT	Vladislavs Lazarevs
14	DF	ARG	Ruben Gauto
15	DF	GEO	Giorgi Kveladze
17	DF	GEO	Saba Nioradze
18	DF	BRA	Lukas Visentin

No.	Pos.	Nation	Player
19	DF	GEO	Tornike Jangidze
20	MF	GEO	Otar Gagnidze
21	MF	GEO	Raul Baratelia
22	DF	GEO	Giorgi Mchedlishvili
23	GK	GEO	Demetre Meparishvili
25	GK	GEO	Avtandil Labadze
27	MF	GEO	Teimuraz Aleksidze
29	DF	GEO	Zurab Gigashvili
30	DF	GEO	Saba Akhalkatsi
31	MF	GEO	Luka Khelaia
32	MF	ARG	Brian Lopes
39	DF	LAT	Daniels Nosegbe-Susko
40	FW	GEO	Tsotne Chikovani

== Managers ==
Name	Nat.	From	To
Levan Anjaparidze	(Georgia (country))	January 2011	July 2011
Koba Mikadze	(Georgia (country))	August 2011	October 2011
Gia Bendeliani	(Georgia (country))	October 2011	September 2012
Leri Megeneishvili (1)	(Georgia (country))	September 2012	December 2012
Dato Chelidze	(Georgia (country))	January 2013	June 2013
Ucha Sosiashvili	(Georgia (country))	July 2013	December 2013
Gela Sanaia	(Georgia (country))	January 2014	October 2014
Giorgi Tsetsadze (1)	(Georgia (country))	October 2014	February 2017
Ucha Sosiashvili (2)	(Georgia (country))	February 2017	April 2018
Badri Kvaratskhelia	(Georgia (country))	April 2018	June 2018
Giorgi Tsetsadze (2)	(Georgia (country))	July 2018	September 2018
Giorgi Daraselia	(Georgia (country))	September 2018	December 2018
Kakhaber Kacharava	(Georgia (country))	January 2019	August 2020
Giorgi Mikadze	(Georgia (country))	August 2020	January 2021
Giorgi Tsetsadze (3)	(Georgia (country))	February 2021	October 2021
Leri Megeneishvili (2)	(Georgia (country))	October 2021	January 2022
Giorgi Shashiashvili	(Georgia (country))	February 2022	April 2023
Dimitar Kapinkovski	(North Macedonia)	April 2023	August 2024
Vladimer Kakashvili (1)	(Georgia (country))	August 2024	December 2024
Mikheil Ashvetia	(Georgia (country))	January 2025	May 2025
Eugenio Sena	(Italy)	May 2025	December 2025
Valery Gagua	(Georgia (country))	January 2026	June 2026
Vladimer Kakashvili (2)	(Georgia (country))	June 2026	

== Honours ==
=== League ===
- Umaglesi Liga/Erovnuli Liga
  - Winners: 2016
  - Runners-up: 1994–95, 2015–16
  - Bronze medals: 2017
- Pirveli Liga/Erovnuli Liga 2
  - Winners: 2008–09, 2013–14
  - Runners-up: 1997–98, 2019
  - Third place: 2011–12 (A Group), 2022

=== Cup ===
- Georgian Cup
  - Runners-up: 2014–15
- Georgian Super Cup
  - Winners: 2017

== Sponsors ==
Since 2019 Archi development company has been a general sponsor of FC Samtredia.

== Name ==
Throughout their history Samtredia have also been named Lokomotivi, Sanavardo, Juba and Iberia with the current name regained in 2006.

Samtredia literally means a place where pigeons reside and comes from Georgian word mtredi - pigeon.
