= Giorgi Daraselia =

Georgian footballer (born 1958)

Giorgi Daraselia გიორგი დარასელია
Personal information
- Date of birth: 17 September 1968 (age 58)
- Place of birth: Mikha Tskhakaya (now Senaki), Georgian SSR
- Height: 1.76 m (5 ft 9 in)
- Position: Attacking midfielder

Team information
- Current team: Hapoel Nof HaGalil (sporting director)

Senior career*
Years	Team	Apps	(Gls)
1986	Dinamo Tbilisi	0	(0)
1988–1989	Torpedo Kutaisi	45	(9)
1989	Dinamo Tbilisi	9	(0)
1990–1993	Torpedo Kutaisi	110	(32)
1993–1995	Kolkheti-1913 Poti	54	(43)
1995–1996	Samtredia	26	(13)
1996–1997	Kolkheti-1913 Poti	28	(15)
1997–1998	Hapoel Tel Aviv	29	(6)
1998	Iberia Samtredia	8	(2)
1998–1999	Hapoel Tzafririm Holon	25	(7)
1999–2002	Hapoel Kfar Saba	38	(8)
2002–2004	Hapoel Tzafririm Holon	39	(12)
Total		411	(147)

International career
1991–1999	Georgia	9	(2)

Managerial career
- 2004–2006: Hapoel Kfar Saba (assistant)
- 2006–2008: Bnei Sakhnin (assistant)
- 2008–2012: Maccabi Haifa (assistant)
- 2012: Hapoel Be'er Sheva (assistant)
- 2012: Dila Gori
- 2013: SKA-Energiya Khabarovsk
- 2013–2014: Zugdidi
- 2014–2015: Torpedo Kutaisi
- 2017–2018: Dila Gori
- 2018: Samtredia
- 2019: Bnei Sakhnin
- 2020: Merani Tbilisi
- 2021–2022: Sioni Bolnisi
- 2022: Shevardeni-1906 Tbilisi
- 2022–: Hapoel Nof HaGalil (sporting director)
- * Club domestic league appearances and goals

Giorgi Daraselia (Georgian: გიორგი დარასელია; born 17 September 1968) is a Georgian football coach and former international player. He is the sporting director with the Israeli club Hapoel Nof HaGalil.

== Coaching career ==
After finishing his playing career in 2004, Giorgi Daraselia became an assistant coach at Hapoel Kfar Saba. He, along with Elisha Levy, in different Israeli clubs worked until September 2012. They twice (2008–2009, 2010–2011) led Maccabi Haifa to the league title.

Giorgi Daraselia passed the coaching requirement courses in the Israel Football Association, and in Spring 2010, received the PRO Category License which allows him to coach professional teams.

Daraselia received his 1st chance as a head coach in Georgia იn September 2012 with Dila Gori of Georgian Highest League (Umaglesi Liga), and led the team from last to second place while winning 16 out of 18 games. During that season, Daraselia became the only coach in Georigia's football history who was able to defeat each of the 11 members of the Umaglesi Liga in a span that lasted from 15 September 2012 to 18 November 2012.

In January 2013, Giorgi Daraselia became the head coach of Football Championship of the National League team of Russia - SKA-Energiya Khabarovsk.

After several years spent at different clubs, in June 2021 he was appointed as a manager of Sioni Bolnisi, which competed in the Georgian second division. Under his guidance the team gained automatic promotion, but after three top-flight games they parted ways upon mutual consent. In the spring of 2022, he spent a short time as head coach of Liga 2 side Shevardeni-1906.

== Career statistics ==
#	Date	Venue	Opponent	Score	Result	Competition
1.	2 July 1991	Stadionul Republican, Chișinău, Moldova	Moldova	2–0	4–2	Friendly
2.	17 September 1992	David Kipiani Stadium, Gurjaani, Georgia	Azerbaijan	3–1	6–3	Friendly
