= Mikheil Ashvetia =

Georgian footballer

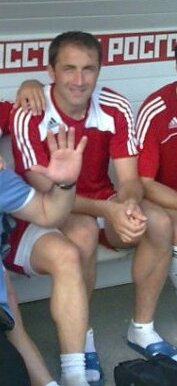
- Ashvetia in 2008

Personal information
- Date of birth: 10 November 1977 (age 48)
- Place of birth: Kutaisi, Georgian SSR, Soviet Union
- Height: 1.83 m (6 ft 0 in)
- Position: Striker

Senior career*
Years	Team	Apps	(Gls)
1993–1994	FC Torpedo Kutaisi	24	(11)
1994–1995	Rtsmena Kutaisi	7	(6)
1994–1995	Samgurali Tskaltubo	13	(5)
1995–1997	FC Torpedo Kutaisi	54	(55)
1997	FC Alania Vladikavkaz	22	(6)
1997–2000	FC Dinamo Tbilisi	57	(49)
2000	FC Alania Vladikavkaz	25	(7)
2000–2001	FC Torpedo Kutaisi	16	(12)
2001–2002	FC København	5	(0)
2002–2003	FC Alania Vladikavkaz	31	(7)
2003–2005	FC Lokomotiv Moscow	42	(11)
2005	FC Rostov	13	(1)
2006	FC Rubin Kazan	17	(2)
2006–2007	FC Carl Zeiss Jena	10	(5)
2008	FC Anzhi Makhachkala	36	(17)
2009	FC Dynamo Barnaul	12	(5)
2009	FC Nizhny Novgorod	10	(1)

International career
1997–1999	Georgia U21	14	(7)
1998–2005	Georgia	24	(5)
- * Club domestic league appearances and goals

Mikheil Ashvetia (Georgian: მიხეილ აშვეთია; born 10 November 1977) is a Georgian former footballer who played as a striker. Most recently he was the head coach of 2nd division club Samtredia.

== Career ==
=== Player ===
Ashvetia played mostly in Georgia and Russia, except for short spells at FC København in 2001–2002 and FC Carl Zeiss Jena in 2006–2007. In Russia, he played for Alania Vladikavkaz, Lokomotiv Moscow, Rubin Kazan and FC Rostov. While playing for Lokomotiv in 2003, he scored a notable Champions League goal against Inter Milan, making the score 2–0 to Lokomotiv, which they would later win 3–0.

He played for the Georgian national team between 1995 and 2005, and was capped 24 times, scoring five goals.

=== Coach ===
In 2016, Ashvetia started working at Torpedo Kutaisi first as an assistant manager to Kakhaber Chkhetiani, later promoted to the manager's position. He left the club in April 2021.

Ashvetia spent next four seasons at Samgurali as an assistant manager, manager and sporting director.

In January 2025, he took charge of 2nd league side Samtredia, who had suffered relegation the previous season. In May 2025, he left the team amid a poor run of form.

== Honours ==
=== Club ===
FC Copenhagen

- Danish Super Cup: 2001

=== Individual ===
- CIS Cup top goalscorer: 2001 (shared)
