= FC Arsenali Tbilisi =

Arsenali Tbilisi
- Full name: Football Club Arsenali Tbilisi
- Founded: 1940
- Dissolved: 2000
- Ground: SKA Stadium, Tbilisi
- Capacity: 2,000

FC Arsenali Tbilisi was a Georgian association football club based in Tbilisi.

== History ==
The club was founded in 1940 as the military club DKA Tbilisi. In the beginning, they played in local competitions. In 1945 the club made his debut in the Group II of the USSR Championship, where he took 4th place. They also competed in the USSR Cup, where he reached the quarter-finals. In 1946 it changed its name to DO Tbilisi. Before the 1950 season began, the USSR football system was reorganized and the Tbilisi club was deprived of the best teams.

In the late 1950s he played in the play-offs against Spartaki Tbilisi for promotion to the B-Class, but lost the competition. In 1951 he played for Spartaki again, but this time he managed to get promotion to the B-Class and in 1952 he started again in the Soviet II league. First, he took first place in his group, and then in the final tournament for promotion to A-Class, he was placed 3rd. In 1953 the team was disqualified from the B-Class competition, but in 1954 their place in the 2nd Division competition was restored. In his group, he finished the games in 3rd place. In 1955 he changed its name to ODO Tbilisi, but was again third in his group. In 1956 he was promoted to 2nd place in his, but 2 points were missing to win the group and fight in the finals for promotion to the A-Class. Only in 1957 already with the name SKWO Tbilisi he won the championship of his group, and then in the final tournament was third (only the champion was promoted). It was the club's last greatest success, in 1968 he took the 6th place in the group, in 1959 he finished the games in the group on the 7th place. In 1960, after another reorganization of the USSR football game system, the club was deprived of the opportunity to perform in professional competitions.

From 1960, under the name SKA Tbilisi, the club was played in amateur games for the championship of the Georgian SSR. In 1968 they won the title of the champion of the Georgian SSR.

Until 1990 the club played in the lower leagues of the Georgian SSR championship. In 1994 they were promoted to the Pirveli Liga. After the 1994–95 season ended, they took 7th place in the eastern group. The following season he was promoted to 6th position. In the 1996–97 season they were finished fourth in the group, but in the following season they were promoted to Umaglesi Liga and renamed to the Arsenali Tbilisi.

In the 1998–99 season they were 9th in the highest Georgian league. The following season, the team first ended up last in their group, then finished second to last in the relegation group and were relegated from the league, and later the club was ceased to exist.

== Honours ==
- SSR Georgia Champion: 2

1943, 1968
