= Zurab Ionanidze =

Georgian-Assyrian footballer

Personal information
- Date of birth: 2 December 1971 (age 54)
- Place of birth: Kutaisi, Georgian SSR, Soviet Union
- Height: 1.82 m (6 ft 0 in)
- Position: Forward

Youth career
- –1990: Samgurali

Senior career*
Years	Team	Apps	(Gls)
1990–1992	Samgurali	67	(15)
1992–1993	Torpedo Kutaisi	29	(14)
1993–1996	Samtredia	71	(49)
1996–1997	Zhemchuzhina-Sochi	24	(7)
1997	Lokomotiv Nizhny Novgorod	7	(1)
1997–2003	Torpedo Kutaisi	142	(90)
2003–2005	Tavriya Simferopol	28	(5)
2005–2010	Zestaponi	112	(48)

International career
1996–2006	Georgia	4	(1)

Managerial career
- 2014: Merani Martvili
- 2025–26: Margveti 2006
- * Club domestic league appearances and goals

Zurab Ionanidze (Georgian: ზურაბ იონანიძე; born 2 December 1971) is a Georgian former professional footballer who played as a forward.

Ionanidze spent most of his nearly 22-year career in Georgia where he won three league titles as well as three national cups. Being the all-time Georgian topscorer with 216 goals, he also set a number of other individual records in the national league and won nominations for Player of the Year three times.

Ionanidze played several games for the national team.

== Club career ==
Ionanidze spent his youth years at Samgurali where he made his senior Umaglesi Liga debut on 31 March 1990 in a 3–1 loss to Kolkheti Khobi. After three seasons in which he netted 15 times in 67 league ties, Ionanidze joined his hometown club Torpedo Kutaisi for a first spell.

In 1993, Ionanidze moved to Samtredia. Especially prolific was his third season, when he scored 23 goals in 15 league games. In total, as Samtredia finished in the top four each time, Ionanidze accrued 49 goals in 71 appearances.

Between 1997 and 2004, he was a member of Torpedo Kutaisi again, contributing to their highly successful and trophy-laden years. In the same year, he lifted his first trophy after winning the national cup with Torpedo. During the next three seasons, Ionanidze claimed another cup and three champion's titles while twice he finished as a league topscorer. In 1999, he entered 100 Club of players with a hundred and more goals in the national league.

In 2004, Ionanidze joined recently formed club Zestaponi where he would win his third cup four years later. On 16 May 2007, he scored against Kakheti to reach 200 goals. On 2 November 2008, Ionanidze played the 400th game of his Umaglesi Liga career. A year later, he made his final appearance in a 2–0 win over Samredia.

Ionanidze announced retirement in early 2010 at the age of 38.

== International career ==
Ionanidze played four friendly games for Georgia national team, making his debut in a 5–0 loss to Romania on 24 April 1996.

On 8 May 2001, he scored the only goal of a home tie against Azerbaijan.

== Managerial career ==
Ionanidze took charge of Umaglesi Liga club Merani Martvili as a head coach in early 2014, but as he failed the save the team from relegation, the sides terminated the contract.

In 2024, when Torpedo's reserve team was restored, Ionanidze was appointed as an advisor.

== Career statistics ==
#	Date	Venue	Opponent	Score	Result	Competition
1.	8 May 2001	Givi Kiladze Stadium, Kutaisi, Georgia	Azerbaijan	1-0	Win	2002 FIFA World Cup qualification
Correct as of 2 June 2012

== Records and achievements ==
Ionanidze has set the following records:

- Most league goals (216)
- Most hauls (4)
- Most braces (30)
- Most Georgian Cup goals (35, shared)

As of 2012, Ionanidze was also leading the list of players with most league appearances (422), although eventually he was surpassed by three footballers.

Ionanidze played eight cup finals, winning twice with Torpedo and once with Zestaponi.

In 2020, Ionanidze won an online vote contest organized by Torpedo's fans, who selected their best player from 1990 up to the present time. While at Torpedo, he had notched 104 goals in 171 league games.

== Personal life ==
His son Davit Ionanidze has played for several top-tier Georgian clubs, including Torpedo Kutaisi. In 2022, he moved to Zestaponi.
