= FC Torpedo Kutaisi =

Torpedo Kutaisi
- Full name: Football Club Torpedo Kutaisi
- Founded: 3 May 1946; 80 years ago
- Ground: Ramaz Shengelia Stadium; Kutaisi, Georgia
- Capacity: 10 400
- Chairman: David Kereselidze
- Manager: Dirk Schuster
- League: Erovnuli Liga
- 2025: (bronze) of 10
- Website: torpedo.ge
Home colours	Away colours

FC Torpedo Kutaisi (Georgian: საფეხბურთო კლუბი ტორპედო ქუთაისი) is a Georgian professional football club based in Kutaisi, Georgia's third largest city. The team competes in the Erovnuli Liga, the first tier of the national football league system.

Being the all-time second most successful Georgian club, Torpedo have been a regular member of the top division apart from three seasons in the late 2000s. They have won the national league four times, the Georgian Cup five times and the Super Cup four times.

Torpedo play their home games at the Ramaz Shengelia Stadium, known until 2015 as the Givi Kiladze stadium.

== History ==
=== The Soviet period ===
FC Torpedo Kutaisi were founded in 1946 as a football club of Kutaisi Automobile Factory. In 1949, the club became the winner of the Georgian SSR Championship. In 1959, Torpedo merged with FC Locomotive Kutaisi, although preserved their name.

Three years later Torpedo Kutaisi took part in the Soviet Top League for the first time. Many famous Georgian football players began their career in this club, among them Revaz Dzodzuashvili, Anzor Kavazashvili, Sergo Kutivadze, Givi Nodia, Manuchar Machaidze, Murtaz Khurtsilava. In addition, when Dinamo Tbilisi won UEFA Cup Winners' Cup in 1980–81, five footballers were the ex-players of FC Torpedo Kutaisi - Tamaz Kostava, Otar Gabelia, Nodar Khizanishvili, Tengiz Sulakvelidze and Ramaz Shengelia.

Torpedo spent one season in the Soviet Second league in 1988. The club also was represented for twenty years in the First league and for 14 more seasons between 1971 and 1990 in the Top league, the first tier of the Soviet football.

Div.	MP	W	D	L	GF–GA
2nd league	34	25	7	2	76–24
1st league	746	338	169	239	1037–818
Top league	443	107	129	207	402–659

=== 1990s and 2000s: Ups and downs ===
When the Georgian National Championship started in 1990, the club changed its name into FC Kutaisi, but after three years restored the old name. The last years of the 20th century and the beginning of the 21st were the most successful years in the club's history. During 1999–2002 the club won five domestic titles. Many players from "FC Torpedo Kutaisi" were represented in the Georgia national football team, including Valeri Abramidze, Sevasti Todua, Malkhaz Asatiani, Levan Silagadze, Revaz Kemoklidze. Besides, several famous managers such as Jemal Kherkhadze, David Kipiani, Revaz Dzodzuashvili, Otar Gabelia, Vladimir Gutsaev worked at the club both as a head coach and in the staff.

After the 2004–05 season, the three-times league champions and two-times cup winners went bankrupt. They sustained a heavy 5–0 defeat in their last game in Borisov, Belarus against BATE Borisov in the first qualifying round of 2005–06 UEFA Cup. Shortly afterwards, new football club "FC Kutaisi Torpedo" was founded, but not being the successor of FC Torpedo Kutaisi, they inherited no titles. "FC Kutaisi Torpedo" was participating in the Georgian Premier League during two seasons, 2005–06 and 2006–07, but due to financial reasons they left the top league and began playing in Pirveli Liga.

=== 2010–2016: Road back to the success ===
Torpedo returned to Umaglesi Liga three years later, after winning the second division in 2009/10.

In June 2010 the newly promoted club signed a sponsorship deal with Wissol Petroleum, which was later renewed. The business relations between the sides lasted until December 2013.

In the first season Torpedo reached the final of David Kipiani Cup where the winner was decided in penalty shoot-out. Gagra better converted from the spot and won the title for the first time in their history.

In the next two seasons Torpedo added two bronze medals to their tally, but a big moment came in 2016 when they won a first Cup title in 15 years. The team eliminated four rivals, including Dinamo Tbilisi in the semifinal, and prevailed over Merani Martvili in the final stage.

In 2016, FC Torpedo was sold by the local municipality at auction, won by businessman Zaal Chachava, who was declared president of the club.

Two months before the Cup victory Kakha Chkhetiani, the ex-Torpedo player for six seasons and later assistant manager for three years, had taken charge of the club. Taking into account plans for new investments, he pledged to carry on with successful run and make a championship challenge next year.

=== 2017–2018: More titles ===
Torpedo won the league for the first time in 15 years in the most emotional circumstances. A title battle continued until the dying seconds of the final game in late November. With two matches to go, Dinamo seemed comfortably sitting on the top, four points clear of second-placed Torpedo. While the former was held to a goalless draw at Saburtalo, Kutaisi won their game, and the rivals had their last fixture in Tbilisi with the gap reduced now to two points. Torpedo were supposed to win in order to secure the title, while their opponents needed just a draw. The team had a 1–0 advantage when Dinamo were awarded a spot kick in the last minute of the game. However, with the penalty saved by goalkeeper Roin Kvaskhvadze, the dramatic win saw Torpedo crowned champions of Georgia.

Six days later Torpedo had a chance to achieve the double by winning the Cup for the second time in a row, although they lost on penalties to Chikhura.

The Super Cup was another title claimed by Torpedo in an opening match of the new 2018 season in February. Chikhura Sachkhere took the lead in 76th min, but Kutaisi equalized ten minutes later with Levan Kutalia scoring in the stoppage time. This was their first Super Cup victory in history.

Torpedo retained 18 players from the champion's squad for the 2018 season. While the club finished 3rd in the league, they once again encountered Liga 2 side Gagra in the Cup final held in Batumi. Torpedo were behind by two goals, but Milos Lacny scored twice and eventually the team won on penalties.

As champions, Torpedo played eight games in UEFA competitions this season. They knocked out two opponents and advanced to Europa League play-off, where Ludogorets Razgrad claimed the victory.

Summing up the season in December, the Georgian Football Federation named Roin Kvaskhvadze the best goalkeeper, whilst Mamuka Kobakhidze and Mate Tsintsadze won nominations respectively as best defender and midfielder. In addition to them, Oleksandr Azatskyi, another central defender, was included in Erovnuli Liga team of the season.

=== 2019–2022: Decline ===
2019 began with yet another success. In the Super Cup Torpedo defeated Saburtalo and won the fifth title within 26 months.

In March Torpedo's unbeaten run consisting of 27 games came to an end. Much worse was to come, though. Financial difficulties hit hard the club again, which led to the exit of twelve players by July. The fans held several rallies, demanding the resignation of Zaal Chachava. In an interview captain Roin Kvaskhvadze described the general situation around the team as unbearable and appealed for help. No wonder a fixture on UEFA Europe league turned out unsuccessful.

In the league one win in 15 matches brought Torpedo close to the drop zone. Unless the problem was solved, the relegation seemed one possibility with dissolution or expulsion to a lower league being other ones. In late August Zaal Chachava announced his departure from Torpedo, although an overall condition was so complicated that in October the club played against Saburtalo with eleven U18 players, including 13-year-old goalkeeper Soso Kopaliani.

Largely at the expense of points picked up earlier this season, Torpedo stayed in the league, but Kakha Chkhetiani, who had spent 39 months at the helm, bade farewell to the club in December.

After a series of negotiations with investors interested in buying the club, an agreement was reached in February 2020. New owner Fabrizio Mannini announced that a new era was about to begin in Torpedo's history, although his tenure lasted one season only.

For two more consecutive years Torpedo had to face the drop. In 2021, a massive fan support helped the team dramatically overturn a two-goal deficit after a first-leg play-off defeat from Merani Martvili.

=== Back on the rise: since 2022 ===
In September 2021, Torpedo were purchased at auction by New Vision University. With financial stability restored and head coach Kakha Chkhetiani back for a third spell now, the team gradually improved its performance and in 2022 ended a four-year trophy drought by clinching the national Cup for the fifth time. In May 2023, Steve Kean was appointed as a head coach who led the team to a third-place finish six months later. The next year Torpedo had another reason for celebrations as the club secured their third Super Cup victory in seven years.

== Honours ==
=== Domestic Georgia ===
- Erovnuli Liga
  - Champions (4) : 1999–2000, 2000–01, 2001–02, 2017
- Erovnuli Liga 2
  - Champions (1) : 2009–10
- Georgian Cup
  - Winners (5) : 1998–99, 2000–01, 2016, 2018, 2022
- Georgian Super Cup
  - Winners (4) : 2018, 2019, 2024, 2026

=== Domestic USSR ===
- Soviet First League (Level 2)
  - Champions (2) : 1960, 1961
  - Play-off
  - Winners (2) : 1960, 1961
- Soviet Second League (Level 3)
  - Champions (1) : 1988
  - Play-off
  - Winners (1) : 1988

=== Regional USSR ===
- Georgian Soviet Championship
  - Champions (1) : 1949
- Kutaisi City Championship
  - Champions (1) : 1947

=== Regional Europe ===
- Commonwealth of Independent States Cup First Division (Level 2)
  - Winners (1) : 2001 (Shared record)

=== Friendly ===
- Turkmenistan President's Cup
  - Winners (1) : 2002

== All titles and awards ==
=== Georgian competitions ===
- Erovnuli Liga
  - (gold) Champions (4) : 1999–2000, 2000–01, 2001–02, 2017
  - (silver) Silver medalists (4) : 1998–99, 2002–03, 2004–05, 2024
  - (bronze) Bronze medalists (7) : 1991, 1993–94, 2011–12, 2012–13, 2018, 2023, 2025 (Record)
- Erovnuli Liga 2
  - (gold) Champions (1) : 2009–10
- Georgian Cup
  - (gold) Winners (5) : 1998–99, 2000–01, 2016, 2018, 2022
  - (silver) Finalists (5) : 1999–2000, 2001–02, 2003-04, 2010-11, 2017 (Shared record)
- Georgian Super Cup
  - (gold) Winners (4) : 2018, 2019, 2024, 2026
  - (silver) Finalists (2) : 1999, 2017
  - (bronze) Bronze medalists (2) : 2023, 2025 (Record)

=== Soviet competitions ===
- Soviet First League (Level 2)
  - (gold) Champions (2) : 1960, 1961
  - (silver) Silver medalists (3) : 1949, 1981, 1984 (Shared record)
  - (bronze) Bronze medalists (1) : 1975
  - Play-off
  - (gold) Winners (2) : 1960, 1961
- Soviet Second League (Level 3)
  - (gold) Champions (1) : 1988
  - Play-off
  - (gold) Winners (1) : 1988
- Snowdrop Cup
  - (silver) Finalists (1) : 1967

=== Soviet Regional competitions ===
- Georgian Soviet Championship
  - (gold) Champions (1) : 1949
- Georgian Soviet Cup
  - (silver) Finalists (1) : 1949
- Kutaisi City Championship
  - (gold) Champions (1) : 1947

=== Regional Europe Competitions ===
- Commonwealth of Independent States Cup First Division (Level 2)
  - (gold) Winners (1) : 2001 (Shared record)

=== Friendly Competitions ===
- Turkmenistan President's Cup
  - (gold) Winners (1) : 2002
  - (silver) Finalists (1) : 2004

== Current squad ==
As of 29 October, 2026

Note: Flags indicate national team as defined under FIFA eligibility rules; some limited exceptions apply. Players may hold more than one non-FIFA nationality.

No.	Pos.	Nation	Player
1	GK	GEO	Oto Goshadze
4	DF	CRO	Matej Šimić
5	DF	GEO	Tsotne Nadaraia
6	MF	GER	Mohamed Cherif
7	MF	GEO	Vladimer Mamuchashvili (captain)
8	MF	CRO	Mateo Itrak
9	FW	SRB	Komnen Andrić (on loan from Rijeka)
10	MF	GEO	Giorgi Kokhreidze
14	MF	BRA	Felipe Pires
15	DF	GEO	Luka Kuprava
17	MF	GEO	Nodar Lominadze
19	MF	GEO	Davit Pertaia
20	MF	CRO	Dino Skorup

No.	Pos.	Nation	Player
21	MF	GEO	Tamaz Goletiani
22	DF	GEO	Dato Bukia
24	DF	GEO	Luka Latsabidze (on loan from Shakhtar Donetsk)
29	MF	GEO	Malkhaz Chitaishvili
30	MF	GEO	Tornike Antia
31	GK	SRB	Filip Kljajić
33	DF	BUL	Mateo Stamatov
35	FW	GEO	Diego Deisadze
38	GK	GEO	Soso Kopaliani
39	FW	FRA	Virgile Pinson
40	MF	GEO	Akaki Shulaia

=== Out on loan ===
Note: Flags indicate national team as defined under FIFA eligibility rules; some limited exceptions apply. Players may hold more than one non-FIFA nationality.

No.	Pos.	Nation	Player
18	MF	FRA	Kisle Zita (at Kolkheti-1913 Poti until 31 December 2026)

== European history ==
=== Overall record ===
Accurate as of 16 July 2026

Competition	Played	Won	Drew	Lost	GF	GA	GD	Win%
UEFA Champions League	12	5	2	5	14	19	−5	41.67
UEFA Cup / UEFA Europa League	22	5	2	15	27	48	−21	22.73
UEFA Europa Conference League	14	3	4	7	15	29	−14	21.43
UEFA Intertoto Cup	4	2	1	1	9	3	+6	50.00
Total	52	15	9	28	65	99	−34	28.85

Legend: GF = Goals For. GA = Goals Against. GD = Goal Difference.

=== Matches ===
Season	Competition	Round	Club	Home	Away	Aggregate
1998	UEFA Intertoto Cup	1R	(Armenia) Erebuni	6–0	1–1	7–1
1998	UEFA Intertoto Cup	2R	(Belgium) Lommel	1–2	1–0	2–2
1999–00	UEFA Cup	QR	(Estonia) Lantana	4–2	5–0	9–2
1999–00	UEFA Cup	1R	(Greece) AEK	0–1	1–6	1–7
2000–01	UEFA Champions League	2QR	(Federal Republic of Yugoslavia) Crvena Zvezda	2–0	0–4	2–4
2001–02	UEFA Champions League	1QR	(Northern Ireland) Linfield	1–0	0–0	1–0
2001–02	UEFA Champions League	2QR	(Denmark) Copenhagen	1–1	1–3	2–4
2002–03	UEFA Champions League	1QR	(Faroe Islands) B36 Tórshavn	5–2	1–0	6–2
2002–03	UEFA Champions League	2QR	(Czech Republic) Sparta Prague	1–2	0–3	1–5
2003–04	UEFA Cup	QR	(France) Lens	0–2	0–3	0–5
2005–06	UEFA Cup	1QR	(Belarus) BATE Borisov	0–1	0–5	0–6
2012–13	UEFA Europa League	1QR	(Kazakhstan) Aktobe	1–1	0–1	1–2
2013–14	UEFA Europa League	1QR	(Slovakia) Žilina	0–3	3–3	3–6
2017–18	UEFA Europa League	1QR	(Slovakia) Trenčín	0–3	1–5	1–8
2018–19	UEFA Champions League	1QR	(Moldova) FC Sheriff	2–1	0–3	2–4
2018–19	UEFA Europa League	2QR	(Faroe Islands) Víkingur Gøta	3–0	4–0	7–0
2018–19	UEFA Europa League	3QR	(Albania) Kukësi	5–2	0–2	5–4
2018–19	UEFA Europa League	PO	(Bulgaria) Ludogorets Razgrad	0–1	0–4	0–5
2019–20	UEFA Europa League	1QR	(Kazakhstan) Ordabasy	0–2	0–1	0–3
2023–24	UEFA Europa Conference League	1QR	(Bosnia and Herzegovina) Sarajevo	2–2	1–1	3–3 (4–2 p)
2023–24	UEFA Europa Conference League	2QR	(Kazakhstan) Aktobe	1−4	2–1	3−5
2024–25	UEFA Conference League	1QR	(Albania) Tirana	1–1	1–0	2–1
2024–25	UEFA Conference League	2QR	(Cyprus) Omonia	1−2	1−3	2−5
2025–26	UEFA Conference League	1QR	(Kazakhstan) Ordabasy	4−3	1−1	5−4
2025–26	UEFA Conference League	2QR	(Cyprus) Omonia	0–4	0–1	0–5
2026–27	UEFA Conference League	1QR	(Azerbaijan) Zira	0–3	0–3	0–6

=== UEFA club ranking ===
As of 4 July 2026

Rank	Team	Coefficient
253	(Montenegro) Dečić	4.500
254	(Moldova) Zimbru Chișinău	4.500
255	(Georgia (country)) Torpedo Kutaisi	4.500
256	(Kazakhstan) Aktobe	4.500
257	(Georgia (country)) Dila Gori	4.500

== Seasons ==
Key

- P = Played
- W = Games won
- D = Games drawn
- L = Games lost
- F = Goals for
- A = Goals against
- Pts = Points
- Pos = Final position
- UML = Umaglesi Liga
- ERL = Erovnuli Liga
- PIL = Pirveli Liga
- STL = Soviet Top League
- SFL = Soviet First League
- SSL = Soviet Second League
- STL = Soviet Third League
- GSSR Cup = Georgian Soviet Society Republic Cup
- DSSC = Dinamo Soviet Society Championship
- GW = Group White
- Z = Zone
- TUR = Union republics
- R1 = First round
- R2 = Second round
- GS = Group stage
- PR = Preliminary Round
- QR = Qualifying Round
- 1Q = First Qualifying Round
- 2Q = Second Qualifying Round

Champions	Runners-up	Third place	Promoted	Relegated

Results of league and cup competitions by season
Season	Division	P	W	D	L	F	A	Pts	Pos	Domestic Cup	Federation Cup	GSSR Cup	Super Cup	UEFA FIFA	Name	Goals
Season	League									Domestic Cup	Federation Cup	GSSR Cup	Super Cup	UEFA FIFA	Top goalscorer	
1946	STL	12	2	2	8	12	20	6	4th		n/a				?	?
1948	DSSC	1	0	0	1	1	3	0	1/2		n/a				?	?
1949	SFL/UR	26	16	8	2	58	25	40	2nd	1/32	n/a	Runners-up			?	?
1953										1/64	n/a				?	?
1955										Z4,1/128	n/a				?	?
1957	SFL/Z3	30	16	6	8	54	28	38	6th	Z3,1/2	n/a				Guram Gomelauri, Omar Kakhiani	10
1958	SFL/Z4	30	17	6	7	66	35	40	4th	Z4,1/4	n/a				?	?
1959	SFL/Z3	26	11	6	9	36	34	28	6th	n/a	n/a				Amiran Zardania, Givi Lejava	10
1960	SFL	30	21	7	2	70	21	49	1st	Z3,1/4	n/a				?	?
1961	SFL	30	22	2	6	49	23	46	1st	1/32	n/a				Givi Lejava	15
1962	STL	18	7	5	6	21	16	19	15th	1/16	n/a				Valerian Chkhartishvili	7
1963	STL	38	6	21	11	22	37	33	12th	1/16	n/a				Roman Siradze	5
1964	STL	32	10	7	15	20	37	27	13th	1/16	n/a				Valerian Chkhartishvili	9
1965	STL	32	8	3	21	29	69	19	16th	1/16	n/a				Jumber Khajalia	10
1966	STL	36	9	10	17	44	59	28	15th	1/16	n/a				Jumber Khajalia	11
1967	STL	36	8	15	13	37	50	31	13th	1/16	n/a				Demuri Vekua	10
1968	STL	38	9	10	19	27	48	28	19th	1/16	n/a				Demuri Vekua	11
1969	STL	26	4	6	16	20	50	14	14th	1/16	n/a				Jemal Kherkhadze	16
1970	STL	32	6	11	15	24	42	23	16th	1/8	n/a				Jemal Kherkhadze	9
1971	SFL	42	12	15	15	47	53	39	11th	1/16	n/a				Demuri Vekua	10
1972	SFL	38	19	6	13	49	32	44	5th	1/16	n/a				Jemal Kherkhadze	12
1973	SFL	38	16	4	18	40	46	34	9th	1/16	n/a				Jemal Kherkhadze	8
1974	SFL	38	14	10	14	37	42	38	8th	1/32	n/a				Jemal Kherkhadze, Merab Chakhunashvili	8
1975	SFL	38	18	13	7	55	31	49	3rd	PR	n/a				Ramaz Shengelia	15
1976	SFL	38	13	15	10	46	38	41	7th	R2	n/a				Ramaz Shengelia	12
1977	SFL	38	15	8	15	45	48	38	9th	R1	n/a				Giorgi Gabechvadze	9
1978	SFL	38	14	9	15	44	41	37	9th	R1	n/a				Badri Parulava, Aleksandre Kvernadze	7
1979	SFL	46	17	15	14	44	40	46	11th	GS	n/a				Aleksandre Kvernadze	9
1980	SFL	46	18	9	19	62	54	45	13th	GS	n/a				Aleksandre Kvernadze	9
1981	SFL	46	26	4	16	57	46	56	2nd	GS	n/a				Deviz Darjania	19
1982	STL	34	10	10	14	39	45	30	13th	GS	n/a				Merab Megreladze	19
1983	STL	34	4	12	18	26	58	18	16th	1/4	n/a				Merab Megreladze	8
1984	SFL	42	23	9	10	76	55	55	2nd	1/16	n/a				Otar Korghalidze	24
1985	STL	34	11	9	14	40	51	31	11th	1/32	n/a				Merab Megreladze	8
1986	STL	30	5	7	18	24	60	17	16th	1/16	GS				Otar Korgalidze	8
1987	SFL	42	11	12	19	30	51	34	21st	1/16					Yason Bzikadze, Melori Bigvava, Gocha Gogrichiani, Aleksandre Kvernadze, Giorgi Tkavadze, David Ugrelidze, Vasili Shengelia	3
1988	SSL	30	24	4	2	70	21	52	1st	1/32					Merab Megreladze	29
1989	SFL	42	18	5	19	69	73	41	13th	1/4					Merab Megreladze	33
1990	UML (Note: Georgian clubs quit the Football Federation of the Soviet Union and joined the Georgian Football Federation - federation of native country.)	34	20	5	9	62	33	65	4th	1/4 (Note: Georgian clubs quit the Football Federation of the Soviet Union and joined the Georgian Football Federation – federation of native country.)					Teimuraz Paikidze	10
1991	UML	19	11	2	6	34	30	35	3rd	n/a (Note: due to changing the basis of the calendar from spring/autumn to autumn/spring, the 1991 cup competition was not held)					Mamuka Khundadze	10
1991–92	UML	38	15	4	19	66	60	49	11th	1/2					David Janashia	17
1992–93	UML	32	16	4	12	70	54	52	5th	1/2					Mamuka Khundadze	19
1993–94	UML	32	15	7	10	56	49	52	3rd	1/16					Mirza Maglakelidze	13
1994–95	UML	30	14	2	14	58	47	44	6th	1/8					Mamuka Khundadze	25
1995–96	UML	30	15	7	8	69	49	52	7th	1/4					Mikheil Ashvetia	31
1996–97	UML	30	14	4	12	70	58	46	5th	1/8					Mikheil Ashvetia	24
1997–98	UML	30	15	9	6	51	30	54	4th	1/8					Giorgi Megreladze	17
1998–99	UML	30	21	4	5	73	27	67	2nd	Winners			Runners-up	Intertoto Cup – R2	Zurab Ionanidze	16
1999–00	UML	28	19	7	2	70	16	64	1st	Runners-up			n/a	UEFA Cup – R1	Zurab Ionanidze	27
2000–01	UML	32	20	8	4	49	15	68	1st	Winners			n/a	UEFA Champions League – 2Q	Zurab Ionanidze	11
2001–02	UML	32	23	5	4	64	18	74	1st	Runners-up			n/a	UEFA Champions League – 2Q	Andriy Poroshin	17
2002–03	UML	32	22	6	4	65	20	72	2nd	1/2				UEFA Champions League – 2Q	Zurab Ionanidze	28
2003–04	UML	32	15	6	11	46	38	51	7th	Runners-up				UEFA Cup – QR	Suliko Davitashvili	20
2004–05	UML	36	20	10	6	56	31	70	2nd	1/4					Giorgi Megreladze	23
2005–06	UML	30	8	6	16	28	42	30	12th	1/8				UEFA Cup – 1Q	Mamuka Gongadze, Otar Kvernadze	4
2006–07	UML	26	9	4	13	24	35	31	7th	1/4					David Gamezardashvili	4
2007–08	PIL	27	11	6	10	38	31	39	11th	GS					?	?
2008–09	PIL	30	14	3	13	32	22	45	9th	1/16					?	?
2009–10	PIL	28	22	4	2	70	12	70	1st	R2					Revaz Kvernadze	14
2010–11	UML	36	14	13	9	31	22	55	4th	Runners-up					Giorgi Megreladze	14
2011–12	UML	36	20	7	9	50	32	67	3rd	1/4				UEFA Europa League – 1Q	Revaz Gotsiridze	13
2012–13	UML	32	19	7	6	57	30	64	3rd	1/4				UEFA Europa League – 1Q	Nika Sabanadze	12
2013–14	UML	32	14	6	12	43	44	48	7th	1/4				UEFA Europa League – 1Q	Nika Sabanadze	13
2014–15	UML	30	10	11	9	39	33	41	8th	1/4					Otar Kvernadze	10
2015–16	UML	30	14	6	10	50	42	48	6th	1/4					Tornike Kapanadze	9
2016	UML/GW	12	4	3	5	16	12	15	6th	Winners					Oleg Mamasakhlisi	5
2017	ERL	36	23	7	6	59	27	76	1st	Runners-up			Runners-up	UEFA Europa League – 1Q	Tornike Kapanadze	14
2018	ERL	36	20	9	7	66	25	69	3rd	Winners			Winners	UEFA Champions League – 1Q UEFA Europa League – Play-off	Tornike Kapanadze	21
2019	ERL	36	12	8	16	53	54	44	6th	1/2			Winners	UEFA Europa League – 1Q	Budu Zivzivadze	13
2020	ERL	20	5	6	9	20	31	17	8th	1/4					Giorgi Pantsulaia	11
2021	ERL	38	10	13	15	41	46	40	8th	1/16					Fadi Zidan	8
2022	ERL	36	15	9	12	48	48	54	5th	Winners					Giorgi Kukhianidze	10
2023	ERL	36	16	12	8	55	37	60	3rd	1/4			3rd	UEFA Europa Conference League – 2Q	Giorgi Arabidze	15
2024	ERL	36	21	7	8	58	40	70	2nd	1/8			Winners	UEFA Europa Conference League – 2Q	Bjørn Maars Johnsen	26
2025	ERL	36	18	9	9	63	41	63	3rd	1/8			3rd	UEFA Europa Conference League – 2Q	Bjørn Maars Johnsen	23
2026	ERL	33	11	11	11	54	45	44	5th	1/4			Winners	UEFA Conference League – 1Q	Komnen Andrić	17

== All seasons statistic ==
Accurate as of 20 November 2026

Competition	Played	Won	Drew	Lost	GF	GA	GD	Win%
Erovnuli Liga	1,104	539	244	321	1,811	1,261	+550	48.82
Erovnuli Liga 2	85	47	13	25	140	65	+75	55.29
Georgian Cup	188	101	41	46	351	194	+157	53.72
Georgian Super Cup	12	4	6	2	12	10	+2	33.33
Soviet Top League	443	107	129	207	402	659	−257	24.15
Soviet First League	746	338	169	239	1,037	818	+219	45.31
Soviet Second League	34	25	7	2	76	24	+52	73.53
USSR Cup	82	27	15	40	93	123	−30	32.93
USSR Federation Cup	3	0	2	1	3	4	−1	0.00
Snowdrop Cup	13	7	4	2	19	7	+12	53.85
Marbella Cup	3	0	1	2	4	7	−3	0.00
Commonwealth of Independent States Cup (Level 1)	8	4	1	3	12	12	+0	50.00
Commonwealth of Independent States Cup First Division(Level 2)	3	3	0	0	8	1	+7	100.00

Legend: GF = Goals For. GA = Goals Against. GD = Goal Difference.

== Managers ==
- (Georgia (country)) Revaz Dzodzuashvili (1978), (1988–89)
- (Georgia (country)) David Kipiani (1 July 1999 – Sept 17, 2001)
- (Georgia (country)) Revaz Dzodzuashvili (1 June 2001 – 1 Jan 2002)
- (Georgia (country)) Otar Gabelia (2004–05)
- (Georgia (country)) Revaz Dzodzuashvili (1 June 2005 – 1 June 2007)
- (Georgia (country)) Giorgi Kiknadze (1 Feb 2007 – 1 March 2007)
- (Georgia (country)) Nestor Mumladze (1 July 2010 – Sept 24, 2010)
- (Georgia (country)) Gia Gigatadze (3 Nov 2010 – 30 June 2011)
- (Georgia (country)) Giorgi Kiknadze (1 July 2011 – Sept 2011)
- (Georgia (country)) Zaza Zamtaradze (1 July 2011 – Sept 25, 2011)
- (Georgia (country)) Gia Geguchadze (1 Oct 2011 – 31 May 2013)
- (Spain) Gerard Zaragoza (31 May 2013 – 31 Dec 2013)
- (Georgia (country)) Revaz Dzodzuashvili (10 Jan 2014 – 7 Dec 2015)
- (Georgia (country)) Giorgi Daraselia (15 Dec 2014 – 5 Oct 2016)
- (Georgia (country)) Kakhaber Chkhetiani (Oct, 2016 – Dec, 2019)
- (Georgia (country)) Mikheil Ashvetia (7 Feb 2020 – 22 April 2021)
- (Georgia (country)) Shota Babunashvili (23 April – 20 June 2021)
- (Georgia (country)) Kakhaber Chkhetiani (21 Jun – 1 Nov 2021)
- (Georgia (country)) Giorgi Tsetsadze (18 Nov 2021 – 2 May 2022)
- (Georgia (country)) Kakhaber Chkhetiani (25 May 2022 – 8 May 2023)
- (Scotland) Steve Kean (19 May 2023 – 21 December 2024)
- (Germany) Dirk Schuster (5 January 2025 – present)

== Rivalry ==
In the Soviet times Torpedo Kutaisi was the second strongest Georgian club with most talented players regularly taken away by Dinamo Tbilisi. After the independence Torpedo became the first to break the ten-year hegemony of Dinamo in Umaglesi Liga. For four successive years between 1999 and 2002 they won five titles in the league and in the Cup combined. By this period the relationship between the best clubs of Eastern and Western Georgia had become tense. Fierce rivalry on the pitch was aggravated on the stands where skirmishes were not unusual. They resumed after Torpedo's reemergence among the leaders following roughly a decade-long absence.

In 2014 the match in Kutaisi was abandoned as a result of clashes between the fans. Some property was also damaged and the police reported ten detentions. The next year some disturbances erupted during the away game in Tbilisi.

Fans angrily react in cases when a player leaves one club for the other. In 2018–20 Levan Kutalia, Giorgi Kukhianidze, Roin Kvaskhvadze, Giorgi Kimadze, Tornike Kapanadze, Nodar Kavtaradze, Omar Migineishvili as well as managers Kakha Chkhetiani and Shalva Gongadze all moved to Dinamo. So did Budu Zivzivadze some time earlier, although he made a way back afterwards.

At any rate, most of the fans realize that Dinamo and Torpedo desperately need each other as strong rivals and healthy competition between them would only contribute to a better quality of the Erovnuli Liga.
