= Erovnuli Liga =

Georgian association football league

- Founded: 1990; 36 years ago
- Country: Georgia
- Confederation: UEFA
- Number of clubs: 10
- Level on pyramid: 1
- Relegation to: Erovnuli Liga 2
- Domestic cup(s): Georgian Cup; Georgian Super Cup
- International cup(s): UEFA Champions League; UEFA Conference League
- Current champions: Iberia 1999 (3rd title) (2025)
- Most championships: Dinamo Tbilisi (19 titles)
- Website: erovnuliliga.ge
- Current: 2026 Erovnuli Liga

The Erovnuli Liga (Georgian: ეროვნული ლიგა; lit. 'National League') is the top division of professional top tier football in Georgia. Since 1990, it has been organized by the Professional Football League of Georgia and Georgian Football Federation. From 1927 to 1989, the competition was held as a regional tournament within the Soviet Union. From 2017, the Erovnuli Liga switched to a spring-autumn system, with only 10 clubs in the top flight.

== Format ==
Below is a complete record of how many teams have played in each season throughout the league's history:

- 1990 = 17
- 1991–1992 = 20
- 1992–1993 = 17
- 1993–1994 = 19

- 1994–2000 = 16
- 2000–2004 = 12
- 2004–2005 = 10
- 2005–2006 = 16

- 2006–2008 = 14
- 2008–2009 = 11
- 2009–2011 = 10
- 2011–2014 = 12

- 2014–2016 = 16
- 2016 (August-December) = 14
- 2017- = 10

== UEFA country ranking ==
- 50 (50) (Northern Ireland) NIFL Premiership (6.375)
- 51 (51) (Georgia (country)) Erovnuli Liga (6.250)
- 52 (52) Luxembourg National Division (5.833)
- 53 (53) (Montenegro) Montenegrin First League (5.625)
- 54 (54) (Wales) Cymru Premier (4.499)

== Champions ==
=== Soviet era ===
as Georgian SSR

- 1927: Batumi XI
- 1928: Tbilisi XI
- 1929–35: Not played
- 1936: ZII Tbilisi
- 1937: FC Lokomotivi Tbilisi
- 1938: FC Dinamo Batumi
- 1939: Nauka Tbilisi
- 1940: FC Dinamo Batumi
- 1941–42: Not played
- 1943: ODKA Tbilisi
- 1944: Not played
- 1945: FC Lokomotivi Tbilisi
- 1946: FC Dinamo Kutaisi
- 1947: FC Dinamo Sokhumi
- 1948: FC Dinamo Sokhumi
- 1949: FC Torpedo Kutaisi
- 1950: TODO Tbilisi
- 1951: TODO Tbilisi
- 1952: TTU Tbilisi
- 1953: TTU Tbilisi
- 1954: TTU Tbilisi
- 1955: Dinamo Kutaisi
- 1956: FC Lokomotivi Tbilisi
- 1957: TTU Tbilisi
- 1958: TTU Tbilisi
- 1959: Metallurg Rustavi
- 1960: Imereti Khoni
- 1961: Guria Lanchkhuti
- 1962: Imereti Kutaisi
- 1963: Imereti Kutaisi
- 1964: IngurGES Zugdidi
- 1965: Tolia Tbilisi
- 1966: Guria Lanchkhuti
- 1967: Mertskhali Makharadze
- 1968: SKA Tbilisi
- 1969: Sulori Vani
- 1970: SKIF Tbilisi
- 1971: Guria Lanchkhuti
- 1972: Lokomotivi Samtredia
- 1973: Dinamo Zugdidi
- 1974: Metallurg Rustavi
- 1975: Magaroeli Chiatura
- 1976: SKIF Tbilisi
- 1977: Mziuri Gali
- 1978: Kolheti Poti
- 1979: Metallurg Rustavi
- 1980: Meshakhte Tkibuli
- 1981: Meshakhte Tkibuli
- 1982: Mertskhali Makharadze
- 1983: Samgurali Tskaltubo
- 1984: Metallurg Rustavi
- 1985: Shadrevani-83 Tskaltubo
- 1986: Shevardeni-1906 Tbilisi
- 1987: Mertskhali Makharadze
- 1988: Kolkheti Khobi
- 1989: Shadrevani-83 Tskaltubo

=== Post-independence ===
Key

†	League champions also won the Georgian Cup, i.e. they completed the domestic Double.

As Umaglesi Liga (Supreme League)

Season	Champions	Runners-up	Third place
1990	Iberia Tbilisi (1)	Guria Lanchkhuti	Gorda Rustavi
1991	Iberia Tbilisi (2)	Guria Lanchkhuti	Kutaisi
1991–92	Iberia-Dinamo Tbilisi (3) †	Tskhumi Sokhumi	Gorda Rustavi
1992–93	Dinamo Tbilisi (4) †	Shevardeni-1906 Tbilisi	Alazani Gurjaani
1993–94	Dinamo Tbilisi (5) †	Kolkheti-1913 Poti	Torpedo Kutaisi
1994–95	Dinamo Tbilisi (6) †	Samtredia	Kolkheti-1913 Poti
1995–96	Dinamo Tbilisi (7) †	Margveti Zestaponi	Kolkheti-1913 Poti
1996–97	Dinamo Tbilisi (8) †	Kolkheti-1913 Poti	Dinamo Batumi
1997–98	Dinamo Tbilisi (9)	Dinamo Batumi	Kolkheti-1913 Poti
1998–99	Dinamo Tbilisi (10)	Torpedo Kutaisi	Locomotive Tbilisi
1999–00	Torpedo Kutaisi (1)	WIT Georgia Tbilisi	Dinamo Tbilisi
2000–01	Torpedo Kutaisi (2) †	Locomotive Tbilisi	Dinamo Tbilisi
2001–02	Torpedo Kutaisi (3)	Locomotive Tbilisi	Dinamo Tbilisi
2002–03	Dinamo Tbilisi (11) †	Torpedo Kutaisi	WIT Georgia Tbilisi
2003–04	WIT Georgia Tbilisi (1)	Sioni Bolnisi	Dinamo Tbilisi
2004–05	Dinamo Tbilisi (12)	Torpedo Kutaisi	FC Tbilisi
2005–06	Sioni Bolnisi (1)	WIT Georgia Tbilisi	Dinamo Tbilisi
2006–07	Olimpi Rustavi (1)	Dinamo Tbilisi	Ameri Tbilisi
2007–08	Dinamo Tbilisi (13)	WIT Georgia Tbilisi	Zestaponi
2008–09	WIT Georgia Tbilisi (2)	Dinamo Tbilisi	Olimpi Rustavi
2009–10	Olimpi Rustavi (2)	Dinamo Tbilisi	Zestaponi
2010–11	Zestaponi (1)	Dinamo Tbilisi	Olimpi Rustavi
2011–12	Zestaponi (2)	Metalurgi Rustavi	Torpedo Kutaisi
2012–13	Dinamo Tbilisi (14) †	Dila Gori	Torpedo Kutaisi
2013–14	Dinamo Tbilisi (15) †	Zestaponi	Sioni Bolnisi
2014–15	Dila Gori (1)	Dinamo Batumi	Dinamo Tbilisi
2015–16	Dinamo Tbilisi (16) †	Samtredia	Dila Gori
2016	Samtredia (1)	Chikhura Sachkhere	Dinamo Batumi

As Erovnuli Liga (National League)

Season	Champions	Runners-up	Third place
2017	Torpedo Kutaisi (4)	Dinamo Tbilisi	Samtredia
2018	Saburtalo (1)	Dinamo Tbilisi	Torpedo Kutaisi
2019	Dinamo Tbilisi (17)	Dinamo Batumi	Saburtalo
2020	Dinamo Tbilisi (18)	Dinamo Batumi	Dila Gori
2021	Dinamo Batumi (1)	Dinamo Tbilisi	Dila Gori
2022	Dinamo Tbilisi (19)	Dinamo Batumi	Dila Gori
2023	Dinamo Batumi (2)	Dinamo Tbilisi	Torpedo Kutaisi
2024	Iberia 1999 (2)	Torpedo Kutaisi	Dila Gori
2025	Iberia 1999 (3)	Dila Gori	Torpedo Kutaisi

== Performance by club ==
Location of Georgian football champions

Club	Winners	Runners-up	Third place	Winning seasons
Dinamo Tbilisi	19	8	6	1990, 1991, 1991–92, 1992–93, 1993–94, 1994–95, 1995–96, 1996–97, 1997–98, 1998–99, 2002–03, 2004–05, 2007–08, 2012–13, 2013–14, 2015–16, 2019, 2020, 2022
Torpedo Kutaisi	4	4	7	1999–00, 2000–01, 2001–02, 2017
Iberia 1999	3	0	1	2018, 2024, 2025
Dinamo Batumi	2	5	2	2021, 2023
WIT Georgia	2	3	1	2003–04, 2008–09
FC Zestaponi	2	1	2	2010–11, 2011–12
Metalurgi Rustavi	2	1	4	2006–07, 2009–10
Dila Gori	1	2	5	2014–15
Samtredia	1	2	1	2016
Sioni Bolnisi	1	1	1	2005–06

== Top scorers ==
Year	Top scorers	Club	Goals
1990	(Georgia (country)) Gia Guruli (Georgia (country)) Mamuka Pantsulaia	Iberia Tbilisi; Gorda Rustavi	23
1991	(Georgia (country)) Otar Korgalidze	Guria Lanchkhuti	14
1991–92	(Georgia (country)) Otar Korgalidze	Guria Lanchkhuti	40
1992–93	(Georgia (country)) Merab Megreladze	Samgurali Tskaltubo	41
1993–94	(Georgia (country)) Merab Megreladze	Margveti Zestaponi	31
1994–95	(Georgia (country)) Giorgi Daraselia	Kolkheti Poti	26
1995–96	(Georgia (country)) Zviad Endeladze	Margveti Zestaponi	40
1996–97	(Georgia (country)) Giorgi Demetradze (Georgia (country)) David Ujmajuridze	Dinamo Tbilisi; Dinamo Batumi	26
1997–98	(Georgia (country)) Levan Khomeriki	Dinamo Tbilisi	23
1998–99	(Georgia (country)) Mikheil Ashvetia	Dinamo Tbilisi	26
1999–00	(Georgia (country)) Zurab Ionanidze	Torpedo Kutaisi	25
2000–01	(Georgia (country)) Zaza Zirakishvili	Dinamo Tbilisi	21
2001–02	(Georgia (country)) Suliko Davitashvili	Locomotive; Merani-91	18
2002–03	(Georgia (country)) Zurab Ionanidze	Torpedo Kutaisi	26
2003–04	(Georgia (country)) Suliko Davitashvili	Torpedo Kutaisi	20
2004–05	(Georgia (country)) Levani Melkadze	Dinamo Tbilisi	27
2005–06	(Georgia (country)) Jaba Dvali	Dinamo Tbilisi	21
2006–07	(Georgia (country)) Sandro Iashvili	Dinamo Tbilisi	27
2007–08	(Georgia (country)) Mikheil Khutsishvili	Dinamo Tbilisi	16
2008–09	(Georgia (country)) Nikoloz Gelashvili	Zestaponi	20
2009–10	(Brazil) Anderson Aquino	Metalurgi Rustavi	26
2010–11	(Georgia (country)) Nikoloz Gelashvili	Zestaponi	18
2011–12	(Georgia (country)) Jaba Dvali	Zestaponi	20
2012–13	(Spain) Xisco	Dinamo Tbilisi	24
2013–14	(Spain) Xisco	Dinamo Tbilisi	19
2014–15	(Georgia (country)) Irakli Modebadze	Dila Gori	16
2015–16	(Georgia (country)) Giorgi Kvilitaia	Dinamo Tbilisi	24
2016	(Georgia (country)) Budu Zivzivadze	Samtredia	11
2017	(Georgia (country)) Irakli Sikharulidze	Locomotive Tbilisi	25
2018	(Georgia (country)) Giorgi Gabedava (Georgia (country)) Budu Zivzivadze	Chikhura Sachkhere; Dinamo Tbilisi	22
2019	(Georgia (country)) Levan Kutalia	Dinamo Tbilisi	20
2020	(Ukraine) Mykola Kovtalyuk	Dila Gori	10
2021	(Serbia) Zoran Marušić	Dinamo Tbilisi	16
2022	(Brazil) Flamarion	Dinamo Batumi	19
2023	(Brazil) Flamarion (Serbia) Zoran Marušić (Georgia (country)) Zurab Museliani	Dinamo Batumi; Dinamo Tbilisi; Gagra	17
2024	(Norway) Bjørn Johnsen	Torpedo Kutaisi	23
2025	(Norway) Bjørn Johnsen	Torpedo Kutaisi	21
