= 2012–13 Georgian Cup =

Tournament details
- Country: Georgia
- Teams: 28

Final positions
- Champions: Dinamo Tbilisi
- Runners-up: Chikhura Sachkhere

The 2012–13 Georgian Cup (also known as the David Kipiani Cup) is the sixty-ninth season overall and the twenty-third since independence of the Georgian annual football tournament. The competition began on 29 August 2012 and will end with the final in May 2013. The defending champions are Dila Gori, after winning their first ever Georgian Cup last season. The winner of the competition will qualify for the second qualifying round of the 2013–14 UEFA Europa League.

As Dila Gori, Zestaponi, Metalurgi Rustavi and Torpedo Kutaisi are participating in Europe, they will join the competition in the round of 16.

== Round of 32 ==
The first legs were held on 29 and 30 August, with the return matches from the 17th to 19 September.

Team 1	Agg.	Team 2	1st leg	2nd leg
Imereti Khoni	3–7	Baia Zugdidi	1–4	2–3
Kolkheti-1913 Poti	5–1	Samgurali	2–0	3–1
Dinamo Batumi	5–4	Chkherimela Kharagauli	2–4	3–0
Skuri Tsalenjikha	0–4	Guria Lanchkhuti	0–2	0–2
Spartaki Tskhinvali	6–3	Liakhvi Tamarasheni	1–2	5–1
Sioni Bolnisi	6–4	Aeti Sokhumi	3–1	3–3
Kolkheti Khobi	0–4	Chikhura Sachkhere	0–2	0–2
Merani Martvili	0–2	Samtredia	0–0	0–2
Locomotive Tbilisi	2–2 (a)	WIT Georgia	1–0	1–2
STU Tbilisi	1–14	Dinamo Tbilisi	0–8	1–6
Shukura Kobuleti	5–0	Mertskhali Ozurgeti	3–0	2–0
Chiatura	0–6	Gagra	0–4	0–2

=== First Legs ===
29 August 2012	Baia Zugdidi	4 – 1	Imereti Khoni	Zugdidi
13:30	A. Parjikia 57'; I. Kobalia 59'; I. Kobalia 72'; Z. Janashia 90+1'		N. Chikhladze 84'	Stadium: Baias satsvrtneli Baza; Attendance: 200; Referee: G. Dograshvili

29 August 2012	Samgurali	0 – 2	Kolkheti-1913 Poti	Tskaltubo
13:40			S. Kvantaliani 9'; G. Krasovski 12' (pen.)	Stadium: Stadioni 26 Maisi; Attendance: 200; Referee: Z. Askarogli

29 August 2012	Chkherimela Kharagauli	4 – 2	Dinamo Batumi	Kharagauli
13:45	G. Tsagareishvili 15'; D. Kostava 50'; G. Tsagareishvili 77'; V. Tchrelashvili 80' (pen.)		A. Bajelidze 61'; D. Sitchinava 70'	Stadium: Stadioni Soso Abashidze; Attendance: 200; Referee: K. Gagnidze

29 August 2012	Guria Lanchkhuti	2 – 0	Skuri Tsalenjikha	Lanchkhuti
13:50	T. Kukuladze 6'; T. Kukuladze 72'			Stadium: Evgrapi Shevardnadze Stadium; Attendance: 200; Referee: I. Kvirikashvili

29 August 2012	Liakhvi Tamarasheni	2 – 1	Spartaki Tskhinvali	Tbilisi
13:50	G. Mindorashvili 20'; G. Tolordava 67'		D. Gelashvili 59'	Stadium: Stadioni Bendela; Attendance: 100; Referee: A. Kritchashvili

29 August 2012	Aeti Sokhumi	1 – 3	Sioni Bolnisi	Tbilisi
14:00	G. Tsertsvadze 10'		V. Isiani 38'; G. Chankotadze 75'; J. Ugulava 90+2'	Stadium: Stadioni Torpedo-Avaza; Attendance: 50; Referee: G. Kruashvili

29 August 2012	Chikhura Sachkhere	2 – 0	Kolkheti Khobi	Sachkhere
14:00	L. Tchelidze 85'; D. Odikadze 90+2'			Stadium: Tsentraluri Stadioni; Attendance: 600; Referee: B. Ninua

29 August 2012	Samtredia	0 – 0	Merani Martvili	Abasha
14:00				Stadium: Stadioni Velodi Miminoshvili; Attendance: 200; Referee: O. Khetsadze

29 August 2012	WIT Georgia	0 – 1	Locomotive Tbilisi	Mtskheta
14:00			A. Gugushvili 60'	Stadium: Mtskheta Park; Attendance: 200; Referee: D. Sanodze

29 August 2012	Dinamo Tbilisi	8 – 0	STU Tbilisi	Tbilisi
14:00	V. Voskoboinikov 8'; V. Voskoboinikov 24'; Mikel Álvaro 29'; G. Merebashvili 34'; Z. Tchavtchavadze 53' (o.g.); Robertinho 59' (pen.); V. Voskoboinikov 71'; J. Dvali 88'			Stadium: Dinamo Arena; Attendance: 200; Referee: M. Beuklishvili

29 August 2012	Mertskhali Ozurgeti	0 – 3	Shukura Kobuleti	Ozurgeti
14:00			V. Tsenteradze 26'; V. Tsenteradze 49'; I. Khutchua 86'	Stadium: Munitsipaluri Stadioni; Attendance: 100; Referee: J. Buishvili

30 August 2012	Gagra	4 – 0	Chiatura	Tbilisi
13:45	G. Metskhovrishvili 7' (o.g.); N. Tchkuaseli 45+1'; D. Volkov 66'; G. Rostiashvili 90'			Stadium: Meranis Stadioni; Attendance: 200; Referee: J. Khorava

=== Second Legs ===
18 September 2012	Imereti Khoni	2 – 3	Baia Zugdidi	Khoni
12:30	D. Svanadze 47'; N. Chikhladze 55'		I. Ekhvaia 10'; N. Shonia 39'; I. Ekhvaia 66'	Stadium: Tsentraluri Stadioni; Attendance: 200; Referee: G. Kikacheishvili

18 September 2012	Kolkheti-1913 Poti	3 – 1	Samgurali	Poti
12:30	S. Kvantaliani 32'; M. Koberidze 52'; G. Bukhaidze 90+1'		T. Kapanadze 23'	Stadium: Fazisi Stadium; Attendance: 150; Referee: L. Silagava

18 September 2012	Dinamo Batumi	3 – 0	Chkherimela Kharagauli	Kobuleti
12:30	A. Mujiri 81'; V. Tevdoradze 84'; N. Diasamidze 90+3'			Stadium: Tsentraluri Stadioni; Attendance: 300; Referee: A. Kritchashvili

17 September 2012	Skuri Tsalenjikha	0 – 2	Guria Lanchkhuti	Tsalenjikha
12:30			G. Kverenchkhiladze 8'; G. Kverenchkhiladze 38'	Stadium: Stadioni Sasha Kvaratskhelia; Attendance: 100; Referee: T. Khutchua

18 September 2012	Spartaki Tskhinvali	5 – 1	Liakhvi Tamarasheni	Tbilisi
12:30	T. Tukhareli 9'; Z. Metreveli 14'; T. Tukhareli 31'; T. Tukhareli 33'; Z. Metreveli 43'		Z. Tchadashvili 47'	Stadium: Stadioni Bendela; Attendance: 100; Referee: Z. Askarogli

18 September 2012	Sioni Bolnisi	3 – 3	Aeti Sokhumi	Tbilisi
08:30	Z. Khurtsidze 34'; V. Nemsadze 69'; J. Ugulava 77' (pen.)		L. Bitsadze 59'; P. Kvikvinia 74'; B. Metreveli 90'	Stadium: Stadioni Torpedo-Avaza; Attendance: 50; Referee: G. Dograshvili

18 September 2012	Kolkheti Khobi	0 – 2	Chikhura Sachkhere	Khobi
12:30			L. Bakuradze 89'; G. Chkhetiani 90+2'	Stadium: Tsentraluri Stadioni; Attendance: 500; Referee: D. Kharitonashvili

18 September 2012	Merani Martvili	0 – 2	Samtredia	Martvili
12:30			Z. Khatchiperadze 23'; B. Gedenidze 90'	Stadium: Municipal Stadium; Attendance: 400; Referee: K. Gagnidze

18 September 2012	Locomotive Tbilisi	1 – 2	WIT Georgia	Tbilisi
12:30	G. Gorozia 77'		B. Zakradze 47'; J. Gogiashvili 59'	Stadium: Mikheil Meskhi Stadium; Attendance: 100; Referee: A. Nonikashvili

18 September 2012	STU Tbilisi	1 – 6	Dinamo Tbilisi	Tbilisi
12:30	G. Gogatishvili 79'		Mikel Álvaro 4'; V. Voskoboinikov 11'; Xisco Muñoz 38'; Xisco Muñoz 44'; V. Voskoboinikov 55'; D. Glišić 88'	Stadium: Dinamos Dighmis Satsvrtneli Baza; Attendance: 100; Referee: G. Kruashvili

19 September 2012	Shukura Kobuleti	2 – 0	Mertskhali Ozurgeti	Kobuleti
12:30				Stadium: Tsentraluri Stadioni

17 September 2012	Chiatura	0 – 2	Gagra	Chiatura
12:30			N. Tchkuaseli 67'; J. Jeremiah 89'	Stadium: Temur Maghradze Stadium; Attendance: 200; Referee: D. Sanodze

== Round of 16 ==
The draw for the round of 16 took place in the new year, with the 8 best-placed teams in the 2012–13 Umaglesi Liga in one pot and the remaining 8 teams in the other. The first legs were held on 26 February, with the return matches from 2 March.

Team 1	Agg.	Team 2	1st leg	2nd leg
Samtredia	0–9	Dila Gori	0–6	0–3
Dinamo Batumi	2–2 (a)	Metalurgi Rustavi	2–1	0–1
WIT Georgia	2–2 (0–3 p)	Spartaki Tskhinvali	1–1	1–1
Guria Lanchkhuti	3–3 (a)	Zestaponi	0–1	3–2
Chikhura Sachkhere	11–0	Shukura Kobuleti	8–0	3–0
Sioni Bolnisi	4–1	Baia Zugdidi	3–0	1–1
Torpedo Kutaisi	3–1	Gagra	1–1	2–0
Kolkheti-1913 Poti	0–3	Dinamo Tbilisi	0–1	0–2

=== First Legs ===
26 February 2013	Dila Gori	6 – 0	Samtredia	Gori
	Kakhelishvili 10'; Nathan Júnior 27', 50', 65'; Gorelishvili 79', 89'			Stadium: Tengiz Burjanadze Stadioni; Attendance: 1,500; Referee: Giorgi Dograshvili

26 February 2013	Dinamo Batumi	2 – 1	Metalurgi Rustavi	Kobuleti
				Stadium: Tsentraluri Stadioni; Referee: Temur Khutchua

26 February 2013	WIT Georgia	1 – 1	Spartaki Tskhinvali	Mtskheta
	Janelidze 48' (pen.)		Metreveli 26'	Stadium: Mtskheta Park; Attendance: 200; Referee: Tornike Gvantseladze

26 February 2013	Guria Lanchkhuti	0 – 1	Zestaponi	Lanchkhuti
				Stadium: Evgrapi Shevardnadze Stadium; Referee: Jener Khorava

26 February 2013	Chikhura Sachkhere	8 – 0	Shukura Kobuleti	Sachkhere
				Stadium: Tsentraluri Stadioni; Referee: Bakur Ninua

26 February 2013	Sioni Bolnisi	3 – 0	Baia Zugdidi	Tbilisi
				Stadium: Stadioni Torpedo-Avaza; Referee: Khvicha Gagnidze

26 February 2013	Torpedo Kutaisi	1 – 1	Gagra	Kutaisi
				Stadium: Givi Kiladze Stadioni; Referee: Arsen Nonikashvili

26 February 2013	Kolkheti-1913 Poti	0 – 1	Dinamo Tbilisi	Poti
				Stadium: Fazisi Stadium; Referee: Goga Kikacheishvili

=== Second Legs ===
2 March 2013	Samtredia	0 – 3	Dila Gori	Abasha
				Stadium: Stadioni Velodi Miminoshvili

2 March 2013	Metalurgi Rustavi	1 – 0	Dinamo Batumi	Rustavi
				Stadium: Poladi Stadioni

2 March 2013	Spartaki Tskhinvali	1 – 1	WIT Georgia	Tbilisi
				Stadium: Stadioni Bendela

2 March 2013	Zestaponi	2 – 3	Guria Lanchkhuti	Zestaponi
				Stadium: Stadioni David Abashidze

2 March 2013	Shukura Kobuleti	0 – 3	Chikhura Sachkhere	Kobuleti
				Stadium: Tsentraluri Stadioni

2 March 2013	Baia Zugdidi	1 – 1	Sioni Bolnisi	Zugdidi
				Stadium: Baias satsvrtneli Baza

2 March 2013	Gagra	1 – 3	Torpedo Kutaisi	Tbilisi
				Stadium: Meranis Stadioni

2 March 2013	Dinamo Tbilisi	3 – 0	Kolkheti-1913 Poti	Tbilisi
				Stadium: Dinamo Arena

== Quarterfinals ==
The first legs will be held on 13 March, with the return matches from 10 April.

Team 1	Agg.	Team 2	1st leg	2nd leg
Spartaki Tskhinvali	1–2	Metalurgi Rustavi	0–1	1–1
Dinamo Tbilisi	3–2	Guria Lanchkhuti	0–0	3–2
Dila Gori	1–5	Chikhura Sachkhere	0–3	1–2
Sioni Bolnisi	3–3 (a)	Torpedo Kutaisi	1–3	2–0

=== First Legs ===
13 March 2013	Metalurgi Rustavi	1 – 0	Spartaki Tskhinvali	Rustavi
	Intskirveli 79'			Stadium: Poladi Stadium; Attendance: 500; Referee: Davit Sanodze

13 March 2013	Guria Lanchkhuti	0 – 0	Dinamo Tbilisi	Lanchkhuti
				Stadium: Evgrapi Shevardnadze Stadium; Attendance: 3000; Referee: Lasha Silagava

13 March 2013	Chikhura Sachkhere	3 – 0	Dila Gori	Sachkhere
	Lomashvili 52', 57'; Bolkvadze 64'			Stadium: Tsentral; Attendance: 250; Referee: Goga Kikacheishvili

13 March 2013	Torpedo Kutaisi	3 – 1	Sioni Bolnisi	Kutaisi
	Pantsulaia 8'; Sabanadze 10'; Dolidze 17'		Mikuchadze 59'	Stadium: Givi Kiladze Stadium; Attendance: 2000; Referee: Jener Khorava

=== Second Legs ===
10 April 2013	Spartaki Tskhinvali	1 – 1	Metalurgi Rustavi	Tbilisi
	Burdzenadze 23'		Gavashelishvili 76'	Stadium: Stadioni Mikheil Meskhi; Attendance: 200; Referee: Giorgi Vadatchkoria

10 April 2013	Dinamo Tbilisi	3 – 2	Guria Lanchkhuti	Tbilisi
	Merebashvili 3' (pen.); Merebashvili 7'; Dzadzamia 86' (o.g.)		Kakaladze 10'; Kverenchkhiladze 82'	Stadium: Dinamo Arena; Attendance: 2000; Referee: Jener Khorava

10 April 2013	Dila Gori	1 – 2	Chikhura Sachkhere	Gori
	Kakhelishvili 90+2'		Tchelidze 25'; Gotsiridze 73'	Stadium: Tengiz Burjanadze Stadium; Attendance: 2000; Referee: Malkhaz Beuklishvili

10 April 2013	Sioni Bolnisi	2 – 0	Torpedo Kutaisi	Bolnisi
	Bibileishvili 52'; Ugulava 90+4'			Stadium: Tamaz Stephania Stadium; Referee: Tornike Gvantseladze

== Semi-finals ==
The first legs were held on 23 April, with the return matches on 8 May.

Team 1	Agg.	Team 2	1st leg	2nd leg
Chikhura Sachkhere	2–1	Sioni Bolnisi	2–0	0–1
Metalurgi Rustavi	2–6	Dinamo Tbilisi	2–1	0–5

=== First Legs ===
23 April 2013	Chikhura Sachkhere	2 – 0	Sioni Bolnisi	Sachkhere
16:00	Odikadze 17' (pen.); Rekhviashvili 20'			Stadium: Tsentral; Attendance: 1,000; Referee: Tornike Gvantseladze

23 April 2013	Metalurgi Rustavi	2 – 1	Dinamo Tbilisi	Rustavi
16:00	Akhalkatsi 68'; Sajaia 84'		Dvali 22'	Stadium: Poladi Stadium; Attendance: 1,000; Referee: Abdullah Baslehlo

=== Second Legs ===
8 May 2013	Sioni Bolnisi	1 – 0 (1 – 2 agg.)	Chikhura Sachkhere	Bolnisi
	Mikuchadze 65' (pen.)			Stadium: Tamaz Stephania Stadium; Attendance: 1,000; Referee: Abdullah Baslehlo

8 May 2013	Dinamo Tbilisi	5 – 0 (6 – 2 agg.)	Metalurgi Rustavi	Tbilisi
	Mikel Álvaro 21', 66'; Xisco 57'; Khmaladze 69'; Merebashvili 87'			Stadium: Dinamo Arena; Attendance: 2,000; Referee: George Vadatchkoria

== Final ==
22 May 2013
18:00 UTC+4

Dinamo Tbilisi	3–1	Chikhura Sachkhere
Merebashvili 58'; Khmaladze 63'; Dzaria 74'; Ustaritz (red card) 78'		Sajaia 90+4'

Mikheil Meskhi Stadium, Tbilisi
Attendance: 3,000
Referee: Lasha Silagava (Tbilisi)

== See also ==
- 2012–13 Umaglesi Liga
- 2012–13 Pirveli Liga
