= 2011–12 Georgian Cup =

Tournament details
- Country: Georgia
- Teams: 28

Final positions
- Champions: Dila Gori
- Runners-up: Zestaponi
- UEFA Europa League: Dila Gori

The 2011–12 Georgian Cup (also known as the David Kipiani Cup) was the sixty-eighth season overall and the twenty-second since independence of the Georgian annual football tournament. The competition began on 17 August 2011 and ended with the final in May 2012. The defending champions were Gagra. The winner of the competition, Dila Gori, qualified for the second qualifying round of the 2012–13 UEFA Europa League.

Dinamo, Zestaponi, Metalurgi and Gagra, the 4 clubs participating in the European club tournaments, joined the competition at the quarter-final stage.

== Round of 32 ==
The participating teams were divided into two zones according to territories - East and West. The first matches were held on 17 August. The return matches were held on 13 and 14 September.

=== East ===
Team 1	Agg.	Team 2	1st leg	2nd leg
Sioni Bolnisi	2–2 (5–4 p)	Norchi Dinamoeli Tbilisi	1–1	1–1
Aeti Sokhumi	0–5	Dila Gori	0–2	0–3
Spartaki Tskhinvali	6–2	Zooveti Tbilisi	4–0	2–2
WIT Georgia	8–1	GTU Tbilisi	2–1	6–0
Chikhura Sachkhere	7–2	Locomotive Tbilisi	5–0	2–2

==== First Legs ====
17 August 2011	Sioni Bolnisi	1 – 1	Norchi Dinamoeli Tbilisi	Bolnisi
	G. Okropiridze 8' (pen.)		I. Chakhvashvili 44'	Stadium: Tamaz Stephania Stadium; Attendance: 200; Referee: T. Gvantseladze

17 August 2011	Aeti Sokhumi	0 – 2	Dila Gori	Tbilisi
			G. Todua 50'; L. Chagelishvili 71'	Stadium: Sikharuli Stadium; Attendance: 100; Referee: D. Kharitonashvili

17 August 2011	Spartaki Tskhinvali	4 – 0	Zooveti Tbilisi	Tbilisi
	Z. Metreveli 29'; Z. Metreveli 39'; V. Kilasonia 45'; R. Jikia 58'			Stadium: Olimpi Stadium; Attendance: 200; Referee: B. Ninua

17 August 2011	WIT Georgia	2 – 1	GTU Tbilisi	Mtskheta
	B. Chimakadze 4'; I. Sikharulidze 25'		A. Mikaberidze 54' (o.g.)	Stadium: Mtskheta Park; Attendance: 100; Referee: L. Silagava

17 August 2011	Chikhura Sachkhere	5 – 0	Locomotive Tbilisi	Sachkhere
	T. Mumladze 5'; N. Gusharashvili 8'; L. Chelidze 21'; G. Silagava 45'; N. Kvaskhvadze 84'			Stadium: Dzveli Stadium; Attendance: 500; Referee: J. Khorava

==== Second Legs ====
13 September 2011	Norchi Dinamoeli Tbilisi	1 – 1 (a.e.t.) (4–5 p)	Sioni Bolnisi	Tbilisi
	A. Shengelia 84'		G. Kutsurua 87'	Stadium: Sikharuli Stadium; Attendance: 300; Referee: A. Nonikashvili

13 September 2011	Dila Gori	3 – 0	Aeti Sokhumi	Gori
	N. Nozadze 17'; V. Nemsadze 33'; I. Beraia 63'			Stadium: Tengiz Burjanadze Stadium; Attendance: 500; Referee: B. Ninua

14 September 2011	Zooveti Tbilisi	2 – 2	Spartaki Tskhinvali	Tbilisi
	L. Lobzhanidze 26'; T. Jimsheleishvili 36'		T. Shonia 53'; T. Shonia 59'	Stadium: Olimpi Stadium; Attendance: 50; Referee: I. Urushadze

14 September 2011	GTU Tbilisi	0 – 6	WIT Georgia	Tbilisi
			G. Koripadze 15'; Guram Gureshidze 17'; B. Chimakadze 23'; G. Sichinava 43' (o.g.); G. Vasadze 73'; I. Sikharulidze 78'	Stadium: Sikharuli Stadium; Attendance: 200; Referee: J. Khorava

13 September 2011	Locomotive Tbilisi	2 – 2	Chikhura Sachkhere	Saguramo
	G. Kimadze 17'; L. Chelidze 90+2'		G. Gureshidze 35'; G. Mchedlishvili 47'	Stadium: Saguramo football complex Attendance: 50; Referee: G. Kruashvili

=== West ===
Team 1	Agg.	Team 2	1st leg	2nd leg
Samtredia	1–4	Sulori Vani	1–1	0–3
Dinamo Batumi	7–0	Mertskhali Ozurgeti	3–0	4–0
Baia Zugdidi	3–2	Chkherimela Kharagauli	0–1	3–1
Torpedo Kutaisi	8–1	Meskheti Akhaltsikhe	2–0	6–1
Kolkheti Khobi	2–2 (a)	Kolkheti-1913 Poti	2–1	0–1
Merani Martvili	1–0	Skuri Tsalenjikha	0–0	1–0
Guria Lanchkhuti	1–2	Chiatura	0–0	1–2

==== First Legs ====
17 August 2011	Samtredia	1 – 1	Sulori Vani	Samtredia
	P. Shatirishvili 9'		N. Giorgadze 42'	Stadium: Erosi Manjgaladze Stadium; Attendance: 500; Referee: D. Kharitonashvili

17 August 2011	Dinamo Batumi	3 – 0	Mertskhali Ozurgeti	Batumi
	T. Beridze 5'; M. Zhvania 50'; M. Jorbenadze 78'			Stadium: Adeli Stadium; Attendance: 500; Referee: K. Chachua

17 August 2011	Baia Zugdidi	0 – 1	Chkherimela Kharagauli	Zugdidi
			D. Kostava 54' (pen.)	Stadium: Gulia Tutberidze Stadium; Attendance: 300; Referee: A. Krichashvili

17 August 2011	Torpedo Kutaisi	2 – 0	Meskheti Akhaltsikhe	Kutaisi
	G. Ioseliani 24'; V. Tabatadze 68'			Stadium: Givi Kiladze Stadium; Attendance: 500; Referee: I. Urushadze

17 August 2011	Kolkheti Khobi	2 – 1	Kolkheti-1913 Poti	Khobi
	I. Kutalia 18'; M. Chkadua 68'		L. Kebadze 74'	Stadium: Central Stadium; Attendance: 500; Referee: M. Beuklishvili

17 August 2011	Merani Martvili	0 – 0	Skuri Tsalenjikha	Martvili
				Stadium: Central Stadium; Attendance: 800; Referee: G. Dograshvili

17 August 2011	Guria Lanchkhuti	0 – 0	Chiatura	Chiatura
				Stadium: Temur Maghradze Stadium; Attendance: 200; Referee: S. Kukhilava

==== Second Legs ====
14 September 2011	Sulori Vani	3 – 0	Samtredia	Vani
	N. Giorgadze 15'; I. Khvadagiani 71' (o.g.); K. Gogadze 73'			Stadium: Grigol Nikolaishvili Stadium; Attendance: 300; Referee: A. Guntadze

14 September 2011	Mertskhali Ozurgeti	0 – 4	Dinamo Batumi	Ozurgeti
			A. Batsikadze 17' (pen.); N. Nasuashvili 32'; M. Jorbenadze 49'; M. Jorbenadze 88'	Stadium: Megobroba Stadium; Attendance: 100; Referee: Zviad Askarogli

14 September 2011	Chkherimela Kharagauli	1 – 3	Baia Zugdidi	Kharagauli
	D. Kostava 63' (pen.)		G. Pachkoria 14'; I. Kobalia 18'; I. Kobalia 80'	Stadium: Soso Abashidze Stadium; Attendance: 200; Referee: M. Beuklishvili

13 September 2011	Meskheti Akhaltsikhe	1 – 6	Torpedo Kutaisi	Kutaisi
				Stadium: Torpedo Kutaisi Training Center

13 September 2011	Kolkheti-1913 Poti	1 – 0	Kolkheti Khobi	Lanchkhuti
				Stadium: Evgrapi Shevardnadze Stadium

13 September 2011	Skuri Tsalenjikha	0 – 1	Merani Martvili	Tsalenjikha
				Stadium: Sasha Kvaratskhelia Stadium

14 September 2011	Chiatura	2 – 1	Guria Lanchkhuti	Chiatura
				Stadium: Temur Maghradze Stadium

== Round of 16 ==
The 12 winners from the previous round competed in this round, as well as the four teams that finished first, second, third and cup winner in last year's Umaglesi Liga, Zestaponi, Dinamo Tbilisi, Metalurgi Rustavi and Gagra. The first matches will be held on 28 September. The return matches will be held on 2 November.

Team 1	Agg.	Team 2	1st leg	2nd leg
Dinamo Batumi	1–3	Torpedo Kutaisi	0−2	1−1
Chiatura	2–5	WIT Georgia	2−3	0−2
Dinamo Tbilisi	2–2	Dila Gori	2−2	0−0
Zestaponi	2–1	Kolkheti-1913 Poti	2−1	0−0
Baia Zugdidi	5–1	Sioni Bolnisi	3−0	2−1
Chikhura Sachkhere	1–3	Metalurgi Rustavi	1−1	0−2
Merani Martvili	3–1	Spartaki Tskhinvali	2−0	1−1
Sulori Vani	1–6	Gagra	1−2	0−4

=== First Legs ===
28 September 2011	Dinamo Batumi	0 − 2	Torpedo Kutaisi	Batumi
16:00 CEST (UTC+04)			Sabanadze 18'; Gotsiridze 28'	Stadium: Adeli Stadium; Attendance: 300; Referee: Silgava

28 September 2011	Chiatura	2 − 3	WIT Georgia	Chiatura
16:00 CEST (UTC+04)	Adamadze 45'; Kiria 64' (pen.)		Chimakadze 38', 42'; Zakradze 41'	Stadium: Temur Maghradze Stadium; Attendance: 300; Referee: Gvantseladze

28 September 2011	Dinamo Tbilisi	2 − 2	Dila Gori	Tbilisi
16:00 CEST (UTC+04)	Jigauri 8'; Kakhelishvili 76'		Jojua 15'; Chagelishvili 76'	Stadium: National Team Technical Center; Attendance: 300; Referee: Kvaratskhelia

28 September 2011	Zestaponi	2 − 1	Kolkheti-1913 Poti	Zestaponi
18:00 CEST (UTC+04)	Dvali 18', 41'		Tsikarishvili 51'	Stadium: David Abashidze Stadium; Attendance: 300; Referee: Krichashvili

28 September 2011	Baia Zugdidi	3 − 0	Sioni Bolnisi	Zugdidi
16:00 CEST (UTC+04)	Guguchia 16', 25'; Samushia 36'			Stadium: Gulia Tutberidze Stadium; Attendance: 500; Referee: Kharitonashvili

28 September 2011	Chikhura Sachkhere	1 − 1	Metalurgi Rustavi	Sachkhere
16:00 CEST (UTC+04)	Gusharashvili 71'		Razmadze 54' (pen.)	Stadium: Dzveli Stadium; Attendance: 700; Referee: Khorava

28 September 2011	Merani Martvili	2 − 0	Spartaki Tskhinvali	Martvili
16:00 CEST (UTC+04)	Ambroladze 8'; Grigalashvili 54'			Stadium: Central Stadium; Attendance: 600; Referee: Nonikashvili

28 September 2011	Sulori Vani	1 − 2	Gagra	Vani
16:00 CEST (UTC+04)	Belekania 45+1'		Nakonechnyi 37'; Magaji 90+1'	Stadium: Grigol Nikolaishvili Stadium; Attendance: 500; Referee: Urushadze

=== Second Legs ===
2 November 2011	Torpedo Kutaisi	1 − 1	Dinamo Batumi	Kutaisi
	Megreladze 29'		Diasamidze 85'	Stadium: Givi Kiladze Stadium; Attendance: 500; Referee: Urushadze

2 November 2011	WIT Georgia	2 − 0	Chiatura	Mtskheta
	Chimakadze 7', 11'			Stadium: Mtskheta Park; Attendance: 100; Referee: Silagava

2 November 2011	Dila Gori	0 − 0	Dinamo Tbilisi	Gori
				Stadium: Tengiz Burjanadze Stadium; Attendance: 1000; Referee: Kharitonashvili

2 November 2011	Kolkheti-1913 Poti	0 − 0	Zestaponi	Lanchkhuti
				Stadium: Evgrapi Shevardnadze Stadium; Attendance: 300; Referee: Gagnidze

2 November 2011	Sioni Bolnisi	1 − 2	Baia Zugdidi	Bolnisi
	Okropiridze 55'		Ekhvaia 57'; Tkemaladze 61'	Stadium: Tamaz Stephania Stadium; Attendance: 300; Referee: Vadachkoria

2 November 2011	Metalurgi Rustavi	2 − 0	Chikhura Sachkhere	Rustavi
	Kvaratskhelia 37'; Modebadze 87' (o.g.)			Stadium: Poladi Stadium; Attendance: 400; Referee: Khetsadze

2 November 2011	Spartaki Tskhinvali	1 − 1	Merani Martvili	Tbilisi
	Metreveli 76'		Samadashvili 62'	Stadium: Saguramos Sapekhburto Kompleksi; Attendance: 100; Referee: Beuklishvili

2 November 2011	Gagra	4 − 0	Sulori Vani	Tbilisi
	Khojashvili 26'; Sharikadze 53'; Jeremiah 70'; Kvantaliani 90+2'			Stadium: Merani Stadion; Attendance: 150; Referee: Ninua

== Quarterfinals ==
The eight winners from the previous round played in this round. The first matches will be held on 24 November. The return matches will be held on 7 December.

Team 1	Agg.	Team 2	1st leg	2nd leg
Gagra	4–2	Merani Martvili	4–0	0–2
Torpedo Kutaisi	2–3	Zestaponi	1–1	1–2
Baia Zugdidi	4 – 7	Dila Gori	2–2	2–5
Metalurgi Rustavi	3 – 1	WIT Georgia	1–0	2–1

=== First Legs ===
24 November 2011	Gagra	4 – 0	Merani Martvili	Tbilisi
14:00	Kalandadze 10'; Sharikadze 24'; Jeremiah 52'; Tkeshelashvili 74'			Stadium: Merani Stadion; Attendance: 200

24 November 2011	Torpedo Kutaisi	1 – 1	Zestaponi	Kutaisi
14:00	Gamezardasvili 34'		Dvali 84'	Stadium: Givi Kiladze Stadium; Attendance: 2000

24 November 2011	Baia Zugdidi	2 – 2	Dila Gori	Zugdidi
14:00	Goginashvili 3'; Khorguashvili 83'		Ekvaia 8', 44'	Stadium: Gulia Tutberidze Stadium; Attendance: 500

24 November 2011	Metalurgi Rustavi	1 – 0	WIT Georgia	Rustavi
14:00	Seturidze 22'			Stadium: Poladi Stadium; Attendance: 100

=== Second Legs ===
7 December 2011	Merani Martvili	2 − 0 (2 – 4 agg.)	Gagra	Martvili
13:30 CEST (UTC+04)	Tape 23'; Grigalashvili 62'			Stadium: Central Stadium; Attendance: 400; Referee: Irakli Urushadze

7 December 2011	Dila Gori	5 − 2 (7 – 4 agg.)	Baia Zugdidi	Gori
13:30 CEST (UTC+04)	Razhamashvili 14'; Chagelishvili 21'; Akhalkatsi 28', 61'; Khorguashvili 72'		Pachkoria 55'; Ekhvaia 89'	Stadium: Kartli Stadium; Attendance: 500; Referee: Otar Khetsadze

7 December 2011	WIT Georgia	1 − 2 (1 – 3 agg.)	Metalurgi Rustavi	Mtskheta
13:30 CEST (UTC+04)	Adamadze 40'		Kavtaradze 29'; Tatanashvilli 70'	Stadium: Mtskheta Park; Attendance: 100

7 December 2011	Zestaponi	2 − 1 (3 – 2 agg.)	Torpedo Kutaisi	Zestaponi
13:30 CEST (UTC+04)	Gorgiashvili 90+1'; Benashvili 90+4'		Gotsiridze 61'	Stadium: David Abashidze Stadium; Attendance: 2000

== Semifinals ==
The four winners from the previous round will play in this round. The first matches will be held on 10 April 2012. The return matches will be held on 18 April 2012.

Team 1	Agg.	Team 2	1st leg	2nd leg
Gagra	2–2 (a)	Dila Gori	1–2	1–0
Zestaponi	2–1	Metalurgi Rustavi	1–1	1–0

=== First Legs ===
10 April 2012	Gagra	1 − 2	Dila Gori	Tbilisi
18:00	Jeremiah 20'		Vatsadze 65', 82'	Stadium: Mikheil Meskhi Stadium; Attendance: 3 000; Referee: Levan Kvaratskhelia

10 April 2012	Zestaponi	1 − 1	Metalurgi Rustavi	Zestaponi
18:00	Dvali 41'		Sikharulidze 37'	Stadium: David Abashidze Stadium; Attendance: 2 000; Referee: Lasha Silagava

=== Second Legs ===
18 April 2012	Dila Gori	0 − 1 (2 − 2 agg.)	Gagra	Gori
			Jeremiah 90'	Stadium: Tengiz Burjanadze Stadium; Attendance: 2 500; Referee: Davit Kharitonashvili

18 April 2012	Metalurgi Rustavi	0 − 1 (1 − 2 agg.)	Zestaponi	Rustavi
			Gorgiashvili 18'	Stadium: Poladi Stadium; Attendance: 1 500; Referee: Malkhaz Beuklishvili

== Final ==
26 May 2012
19:00 UTC+04:00

Dila Gori	4–1	Zestaponi
Khojava 31' (pen.); Vatsadze 49'; Iluridze 64'; Intskirveli 90'		Aptsiauri 14'; Gongadze (red card) 30'; Dvali (red card) 83'

Mikheil Meskhi Stadium, Tbilisi
Attendance: 8,000
Referee: Levan Kvaratskhelia (Tbilisi)

== See also ==
- 2011–12 Umaglesi Liga
- 2011–12 Pirveli Liga
