= 2011–12 Umaglesi Liga =

Umaglesi Liga
- Season: 2011–12
- Dates: 6 August 2011 – 21 May 2012
- Champions: Zestaponi; 2nd Georgian title
- Relegated: Spartaki-Tskhinvali; Gagra
- Champions League: Zestaponi
- Europa League: Metalurgi Rustavi; Torpedo Kutaisi; Dila Gori
- Matches: 138
- Goals: 338 (2.45 per match)
- Top goalscorer: Jaba Dvali (20)
- Biggest home win: WIT 4–0 Baia; Zestaponi 5–1 Dinamo Tbilisi
- Biggest away win: Spartaki-Tskhinvali 1–5 Zestaponi; Zestaponi 0–4 Dila
- Highest scoring: Torpedo 5–2 Gagra; Zestaponi 5–2 Spartaki-Tskhinvali; WIT 4–3 Dila

The 2011–12 Umaglesi Liga was the 23rd season of top-tier football in Georgia. It began on 6 August 2011 and ended on 21 May 2012. The league added two teams for this season, increasing its size from ten to twelve teams.

The league was won by Zestaponi, who successfully defended their title. Metalurgi Rustavi, Torpedo Kutaisi and Dila Gori qualified for the 2012–13 UEFA Europa League, while Spartaki Tskhinvali and Gagra were relegated.

== Changes from 2010–11 season ==
The league expanded from ten to twelve teams for this season. In order to accommodate the additional teams, the competition mode was changed from a single-phase, quadruple round-robin schedule to a double-phase championship.

All twelve teams first played a regular double round-robin schedule for a total of 22 matches, once at home and once away against each opponent. The best eight teams were then admitted to a championship round, while the remaining four teams were to compete with the best two teams of each of the two 2011–12 Pirveli Liga divisions for a total of four free spots in the 2012–13 season.

== Teams ==
Due to the expansion from ten to twelve teams, no teams were directly relegated at the end of the 2010–11 season. However, the ninth- and tenth-placed teams, Spartaki Tskhinvali and FC Samtredia, had to participate in single-match relegation/promotion play-off matches against third- and fourth-placed 2010–11 Pirveli Liga sides Dila Gori and Chikhura Sachkhere. In these matches, Spartaki Tskhinvali retained their Umaglesi Liga berth by beating Chikhura 2–1, while Samtredia were relegated after a 2–0 loss against Dila Gori. Samtredia hence completed a two-year tenure in the league; Dila Gori returned after a three-season absence.

The directly promoted teams from the 2010–11 Pirveli Liga were champions Gagra and runners-up Merani Martvili. Gagra returned to the top Georgian football league after only one season at the second tier, while Merani Martvili made their debut at the highest level of the league pyramid.

In other changes, Olimpi Rustavi were renamed Metalurgi Rustavi prior to this season.

=== Stadiums and locations ===
Spartaki Tskhinvali and Gagra play their home matches in Tbilisi due to various inner-Georgian conflicts.

FC WIT Georgia moved from Tbilisi to the newly constructed Mtskheta Park in Mtskheta.

Locations of teams in the 2011–12 Umaglesi Liga

Team	Location	Venue	Capacity
Baia Zugdidi	Zugdidi	Gulia Tutberidze Stadium	5,000
Dila Gori	Gori	Tengiz Burjanadze Stadium	5,000
Dinamo Tbilisi	Tbilisi	Boris Paichadze Stadium	54,549
Gagra	Tbilisi	Merani Stadium	2,000
Kolkheti Poti	Poti	Fazisi Stadium	4,000
Merani Martvili	Martvili	Municipal Stadium	2,000
Metalurgi Rustavi	Rustavi	Poladi Stadium	6,000
Sioni Bolnisi	Bolnisi	Tamaz Stephania Stadium	3,000
Spartaki Tskhinvali	Tbilisi	Mikheil Meskhi Stadium	27,223
Torpedo Kutaisi	Kutaisi	Givi Kiladze Stadium	14,700
WIT Georgia	Mtskheta	Mtskheta Park	2,000
Zestaponi	Zestaponi	David Abashidze Stadium	4,558

== First phase ==
The league began with a regular double-round robin schedule on 6 August 2011 and concluded this phase on 8 March 2012. The best eight teams qualified for the championship round, which will determine the Georgian champions and the participants for the 2012–13 European competitions. The remaining four teams qualified for the promotion/relegation round, where they will have to compete with the best two teams of each of the two 2011–12 Pirveli Liga divisions for four free places in the 2012–13 competition.

=== League table ===
Pos	Team	Pld	W	D	L	GF	GA	GD	Pts	Qualification
1	Zestaponi	22	17	3	2	45	17	+28	54	Qualification to Championship group
2	Dinamo Tbilisi	22	14	3	5	44	24	+20	45	Qualification to Championship group
3	Torpedo Kutaisi	22	13	4	5	33	19	+14	43	Qualification to Championship group
4	Metalurgi Rustavi	22	9	6	7	25	26	−1	33	Qualification to Championship group
5	Merani Martvili	22	9	3	10	23	26	−3	30	Qualification to Championship group
6	Baia Zugdidi	22	8	4	10	21	26	−5	28	Qualification to Championship group
7	Dila Gori	22	7	5	10	29	28	+1	26	Qualification to Championship group
8	Kolkheti Poti	22	6	8	8	19	24	−5	26	Qualification to Championship group
9	WIT Georgia	22	6	7	9	23	27	−4	25	Qualification to Relegation group
10	Spartaki Tskhinvali	22	6	6	10	22	32	−10	24	Qualification to Relegation group
11	Gagra	22	6	3	13	21	32	−11	21	Qualification to Relegation group
12	Sioni Bolnisi	22	2	6	14	13	37	−24	12	Qualification to Relegation group

Source: Soccerway
Rules for classification: 1) points; 2) goal difference; 3) number of goals scored.

=== Results ===
Home \ Away	BAI	DIL	DIN	GAG	KOL	MER	MET	SIO	SPA	TKU	WIT	ZES
Baia Zugdidi		0–0	2–1	3–0	2–0	1–0	1–2	3–0	1–3	1–1	0–1	1–2
Dila Gori	0–2		1–2	1–0	0–0	3–0	3–1	1–0	1–2	0–1	1–1	0–2
Dinamo Tbilisi	5–1	2–0		3–0	1–1	2–1	2–3	1–0	2–0	2–0	2–0	2–2
Gagra	0–1	2–1	1–2		1–2	3–0	2–0	0–0	0–0	0–1	1–0	0–1
Kolkheti Poti	0–0	0–1	0–3	2–3		0–1	3–1	2–1	1–0	0–0	2–0	0–2
Merani Martvili	1–0	2–2	2–1	1–0	0–2		1–2	3–0	2–0	1–0	3–0	0–2
Metalurgi Rustavi	2–0	3–1	0–2	1–1	0–0	2–1		1–2	0–0	2–0	0–0	0–0
Sioni Bolnisi	2–0	0–3	0–3	1–3	0–0	0–0	2–2		1–2	1–3	1–1	1–2
Spartaki Tskhinvali	1–2	2–2	1–2	2–1	1–1	1–2	0–1	0–0		2–0	2–1	1–5
Torpedo Kutaisi	0–0	2–1	2–1	5–2	4–1	2–1	3–0	2–0	2–0		2–2	1–2
WIT Georgia	4–0	4–3	2–2	1–0	2–1	0–0	0–2	4–1	0–0	0–1		0–1
Zestaponi	1–0	0–4	5–1	4–1	1–1	3–1	2–0	1–0	5–2	0–1	2–0	

Source: Soccerway
Legend: Blue = home team win; Yellow = draw; Red = away team win.

== Second phase ==
This phase began on 12 March 2012 and will end on 21 May 2012.

=== Championship round ===
Zestaponi, Dinamo Tbilisi, Torpedo Kutaisi, Metalurgi Rustavi, Merani Martvili, Baia Zugdidi, Dila Gori and Kolkheti Poti ended the first phase in the top eight positions of the table and thus entered the championship round.

The results of the matches among these teams will be used as a base ranking. Each team will then play another double round-robin schedule against every other team.

==== Table ====
Pos	Team	Pld	W	D	L	GF	GA	GD	Pts	Qualification
1	Zestaponi (C)	28	16	7	5	52	28	+24	55	Qualification for the Champions League second qualifying round
2	Metalurgi Rustavi	28	17	4	7	39	28	+11	55	Qualification for the Europa League first qualifying round
3	Torpedo Kutaisi	28	14	6	8	33	25	+8	48	Qualification for the Europa League first qualifying round
4	Dinamo Tbilisi	28	10	10	8	47	35	+12	40	
5	Dila Gori	28	10	7	11	38	32	+6	37	Qualification for the Europa League second qualifying round (Note: The winners of the 2011–12 Georgian Cup, Dila Gori, qualified for the second qualifying round of UEFA Europa League.)
6	Kolkheti Poti	28	7	8	13	25	39	−14	29	
7	Baia Zugdidi	28	5	7	16	25	48	−23	22	
8	Merani Martvili	28	6	3	19	31	55	−24	21	

Source: Soccerway
Rules for classification: 1) points; 2) head-to-head points; 3) head-to-head goal difference; 4) head-to-head goals scored; 5) goal difference; 6) number of goals scored.
(C) Champions

==== Results ====
Home \ Away	BAI	DIL	DIN	KOL	MER	MET	TKU	ZES
Baia Zugdidi		1–1	2–2	2–3	2–1	0–1	0–2	1–1
Dila Gori	3–1		0–0	5–1	4–2	0–1	1–0	1–2
Dinamo Tbilisi	6–1	0–0		1–1	2–2	1–1	0–1	1–1
Kolkheti Poti	2–1	0–0	2–1		4–1	0–2	1–0	0–4
Merani Martvili	2–1	1–2	1–3	0–1		2–3	3–0	4–4
Metalurgi Rustavi	4–0	1–0	2–1	1–0	2–0		2–1	0–2
Torpedo Kutaisi	2–1	3–2	1–1	3–1	2–0	0–0		2–1
Zestaponi	4–1	2–3	0–1	2–1	3–0	2–1	0–0	

Source: Soccerway
Legend: Blue = home team win; Yellow = draw; Red = away team win.

=== Promotion/relegation round ===
WIT Georgia, Spartaki Tskhinvali, Gagra and Sioni Bolnisi finished ninth through twelfth and thus entered the promotion/relegation round, where they will meet the best two teams from each of the two 2011–12 Pirveli Liga divisions. These four teams are Dinamo Batumi, Mertskhali Ozurgeti, Chikhura Sachkhere and Guria Lanchkhuti.

Each team will play another double round-robin schedule against every other team. The best four teams of this round will qualify for the 2012–13 Umaglesi Liga, with the remaining teams beginning the 2012–13 season in the Pirveli Liga.

==== Table ====
Pos	Team	Pld	W	D	L	GF	GA	GD	Pts	Qualification or relegation
1	Chikhura Sachkhere (P)	14	8	2	4	25	15	+10	26	Qualification to Umaglesi Liga
2	Sioni Bolnisi	14	6	6	2	23	13	+10	24	Qualification to Umaglesi Liga
3	Dinamo Batumi (P)	14	7	3	4	18	13	+5	24	Qualification to Umaglesi Liga
4	WIT Georgia	14	7	2	5	19	11	+8	23	Qualification to Umaglesi Liga
5	Guria Lanchkhuti	14	6	5	3	22	21	+1	23	Relegation to Pirveli Liga
6	Spartaki Tskhinvali (R)	14	6	3	5	19	16	+3	21	Relegation to Pirveli Liga
7	Gagra (R)	14	3	4	7	14	21	−7	13	Relegation to Pirveli Liga
8	Mertskhali Ozurgeti	14	0	1	13	3	33	−30	1	Relegation to Pirveli Liga

Source: Soccerway
Rules for classification: 1) points; 2) head-to-head points; 3) head-to-head goal difference; 4) head-to-head goals scored; 5) goal difference; 6) number of goals scored.
(P) Promoted; (R) Relegated

==== Results ====
Home \ Away	CHI	DBA	GAG	GUR	MOZ	SIO	SPA	WIT
Chikhura Sachkhere		0–0	2–1	5–0	4–0	0–0	0–3	2–0
Dinamo Batumi	2–1		1–0	1–3	4–0	1–1	1–0	2–0
Gagra	2–1	3–0		1–1	0–0	1–2	0–2	0–0
Guria Lanchkhuti	0–2	1–1	2–2		4–0	1–1	2–1	1–0
Mertskhali Ozurgeti	1–2	0–1	0–2	0–2		1–3	0–1	1–2
Sioni Bolnisi	3–1	1–0	2–1	2–3	5–0		1–1	0–0
Spartaki Tskhinvali	2–3	1–3	2–1	2–2	1–0	2–2		1–0
WIT Georgia	1–2	3–1	6–1	3–0	2–0	1–0	1–0	

Source: Soccerway
Legend: Blue = home team win; Yellow = draw; Red = away team win.

== Top goalscorers ==
Rank	Goalscorer	Team	Goals
1	(Georgia (country)) Jaba Dvali	Zestaponi	20
2	(Spain) Xisco	Dinamo Tbilisi	13
3	(Georgia (country)) Dimitri Tatanashvili	Metalurgi Rustavi	12
4	(Georgia (country)) Revaz Gotsiridze	Torpedo Kutaisi	10
4	(Georgia (country)) Mate Vatsadze	Dila Gori	10
6	(Georgia (country)) Giga Zhvania	Merani Martvili	9
7	(Georgia (country)) Tornike Gorgiashvili	Zestaponi	8
8	(Georgia (country)) Nikoloz Sabanadze	Torpedo Kutaisi	7
8	(Georgia (country)) Nikoloz Gelashvili	Zestaponi	7
8	(Georgia (country)) Besik Chimakadze	WIT Georgia	7
8	(Georgia (country)) Aleksandre Koshkadze	Dinamo Tbilisi	7

== See also ==
- 2011–12 Pirveli Liga
- 2011–12 Georgian Cup
