= 2013–14 Umaglesi Liga =

Umaglesi Liga
- Season: 2013–14
- Dates: 10 August 2013 – 17 May 2014
- Champions: Dinamo Tbilisi; 15th Georgian title
- Relegated: None
- Champions League: Dinamo Tbilisi
- Europa League: Zestaponi; Sioni Bolnisi; Chikhura Sachkhere
- Matches played: 192
- Goals scored: 486 (2.53 per match)
- Top goalscorer: Xisco (19)
- Biggest home win: Dinamo Tbilisi 6–1 Chikhura; Metalurgi 6–1 Merani; WIT 5–0 Torpedo
- Biggest away win: Guria 0–5 Zestaponi
- Highest scoring: Dinamo Tbilisi 6–1 Chikhura; Metalurgi 6–1 Merani; WIT 5–2 Metalurgi

The 2013–14 Umaglesi Liga was the 25th season of top-tier football in Georgia. The season began on 10 August 2013 and ended on 17 May 2014.

== Teams ==
=== Stadiums and locations ===
Locations of teams in the 2013–14 Umaglesi Liga

Team	Location	Venue	Capacity
Chikhura	Sachkhere	Givi Kiladze Stadium	14,700
Dila Gori	Gori	Tengiz Burjanadze Stadium	5,000
Dinamo Tbilisi	Tbilisi	Boris Paichadze Stadium	54,549
Guria Lanchkhuti	Lanchkhuti	Fazisi Stadium	3,000
Merani Martvili	Martvili	Erosi Manjgaladze Stadium	2,000
Metalurgi Rustavi	Rustavi	Poladi Stadium	6,000
Sioni Bolnisi	Bolnisi	Mikheil Meskhi Stadium	27,223
Spartaki-Tskhinvali Tbilisi	Tskhinvali	Mikheil Meskhi Stadium	27,223
Torpedo Kutaisi	Kutaisi	Givi Kiladze Stadium	14,700
WIT Georgia	Mtskheta	Mtskheta Park	2,000
Zestaponi	Zestaponi	David Abashidze Stadium	4,558
Zugdidi	Zugdidi	Anaklia Stadium	1,000

== First phase ==
The league began with a regular double-round robin schedule on 10 August 2013. The best six teams qualified for the championship round, which will determine the Georgian champions and the participants for the 2014–15 European competitions. The remaining six teams play in the relegation group, where the top four will secure places in the 2014–15 competition.

=== League table ===
Pos	Team	Pld	W	D	L	GF	GA	GD	Pts	Qualification
1	Dinamo Tbilisi	22	15	3	4	51	17	+34	48	Qualification to Championship group
2	Zestaponi	22	12	4	6	30	15	+15	40	Qualification to Championship group
3	Chikhura Sachkhere	22	11	5	6	40	33	+7	38	Qualification to Championship group
4	Sioni Bolnisi	22	9	6	7	27	23	+4	33	Qualification to Championship group
5	Metalurgi Rustavi	22	9	6	7	26	25	+1	33	Qualification to Championship group
6	Guria Lanchkhuti	22	11	0	11	25	29	−4	33	Qualification to Championship group
7	Dila Gori	22	8	8	6	28	22	+6	32	Qualification to Relegation group
8	WIT Georgia	22	8	5	9	28	29	−1	29	Qualification to Relegation group
9	Torpedo Kutaisi	22	8	5	9	24	30	−6	29	Qualification to Relegation group
10	Spartaki-Tskhinvali	22	6	2	14	19	32	−13	20	Qualification to Relegation group
11	Zugdidi	22	5	5	12	12	30	−18	20	Qualification to Relegation group
12	Merani Martvili	22	4	3	15	16	41	−25	15	Qualification to Relegation group

Source: GFF
Rules for classification: 1) points; 2) goal difference; 3) number of goals scored.
The winner of the 2013–14 Georgian Cup will qualify for the first qualifying round of 2014–15 UEFA Europa League.

=== Results ===
Home \ Away	CHI	DIL	DIN	GUR	MER	MET	SIO	STT	TKU	WIT	ZES	ZUG
Chikhura Sachkhere		3–1	1–5	5–1	2–0	2–3	1–1	2–1	1–2	3–0	1–0	2–0
Dila Gori	0–0		1–1	1–3	3–0	3–0	0–2	3–1	3–0	1–1	3–1	1–1
Dinamo Tbilisi	6–1	1–1		3–1	4–1	0–1	1–2	2–0	2–1	0–1	2–1	3–0
Guria Lanchkhuti	2–0	2–0	2–1		1–0	3–1	1–2	0–1	2–0	2–1	0–1	1–0
Merani Martvili	3–2	1–2	0–2	1–2		0–0	2–0	2–1	0–3	1–2	0–2	2–0
Metalurgi Rustavi	1–1	0–0	0–0	3–1	6–1		0–2	1–0	2–1	2–0	0–0	1–0
Sioni Bolnisi	2–2	1–2	1–4	2–0	2–0	0–1		3–2	1–2	1–1	0–1	1–0
Spartaki-Tskhinvali	2–3	0–0	0–4	0–1	1–0	2–0	0–2		0–1	3–1	1–0	2–0
Torpedo Kutaisi	1–2	0–0	0–3	1–0	1–1	1–1	1–1	1–0		4–1	0–1	1–2
WIT Georgia	0–2	0–2	0–2	3–0	3–0	5–2	0–0	2–1	5–0		0–2	1–0
Zestaponi	1–1	2–0	1–2	1–0	2–0	2–1	0–0	3–0	2–3	1–1		3–0
Zugdidi	1–3	2–1	0–3	2–0	0–0	1–0	2–1	1–1	0–0	0–0	0–3	

Source: GFF
Legend: Blue = home team win; Yellow = draw; Red = away team win.

== Second phase ==
=== Championship round ===
==== Table ====
Pos	Team	Pld	W	D	L	GF	GA	GD	Pts	Qualification
1	Dinamo Tbilisi (C)	32	21	5	6	67	23	+44	68	Qualification for the Champions League second qualifying round
2	Zestaponi	32	19	5	8	48	23	+25	62	Qualification for the Europa League second qualifying round (Note: As Champions League-qualified Dinamo Tbilisi won the 2013–14 Georgian Cup, loser finalists Chikhura Sachkhere qualified for first qualifying round of 2014–15 UEFA Europa League as cup runners-up and league runners-up Zestaponi earned the spot in the second qualifying round.)
3	Sioni Bolnisi	32	16	7	9	41	33	+8	55	Qualification for the Europa League first qualifying round
4	Chikhura Sachkhere	32	13	7	12	56	50	+6	46	Qualification for the Europa League first qualifying round
5	Metalurgi Rustavi	32	13	6	13	35	39	−4	45	
6	Guria Lanchkhuti	32	12	0	20	31	53	−22	36	

Source: GFF
Rules for classification: 1) points; 2) goal difference; 3) number of goals scored.
(C) Champions

==== Results ====
Home \ Away	CHI	DIN	GUR	MET	SIO	ZES
Chikhura Sachkhere		1–1	3–0	4–1	1–2	2–3
Dinamo Tbilisi	0–0		3–0	2–0	0–1	1–0
Guria Lanchkhuti	3–2	1–2		1–3	1–2	0–5
Metalurgi Rustavi	2–0	0–2	1–0		2–0	0–1
Sioni Bolnisi	3–2	0–3	2–0	2–0		2–1
Zestaponi	2–1	3–2	1–0	2–0	0–0	

Source: GFF
Legend: Blue = home team win; Yellow = draw; Red = away team win.

=== Relegation round ===
==== Table ====
Pos	Team	Pld	W	D	L	GF	GA	GD	Pts
7	Torpedo Kutaisi	32	14	6	12	43	44	−1	48
8	WIT Georgia	32	13	6	13	41	45	−4	45
9	Dila Gori	32	11	8	13	44	36	+8	41
10	Spartaki-Tskhinvali	32	12	4	16	33	38	−5	40
11	Zugdidi	32	10	6	16	26	42	−16	36
12	Merani Martvili	32	6	4	22	21	60	−39	22

Source: GFF
Rules for classification: 1) points; 2) goal difference; 3) number of goals scored.

==== Results ====
Home \ Away	DIL	MER	STT	TKU	WIT	ZUG
Dila Gori		1–2	1–3	3–0	1–2	0–1
Merani Martvili	0–3		0–0	0–1	0–2	2–1
Spartaki-Tskhinvali	2–1	2–0		1–2	2–0	1–1
Torpedo Kutaisi	0–4	5–1	0–2		6–1	3–1
WIT Georgia	2–1	1–0	0–1	1–1		1–2
Zugdidi	2–1	3–0	1–0	0–1	2–3	

Source: GFF
Legend: Blue = home team win; Yellow = draw; Red = away team win.

== See also ==
- 2013–14 Georgian Cup
