= 2019 Erovnuli Liga 2 =

Erovnuli Liga 2
- Season: 2019
- Dates: 2 March – 30 November 2019
- Champions: Merani Tbilisi
- Promoted: Merani Tbilisi; Samtredia; Telavi
- Relegated: Guria Lanchkhuti; Kolkheti-1913 Poti; Tskhinvali
- Matches: 180
- Goals: 495 (2.75 per match)
- Top goalscorer: Giorgi Nikabadze (26 goals)

The 2019 Erovnuli Liga 2 (formerly known as Pirveli Liga) was the 31st season of second tier football in Georgia. The season began on 2 March 2019 and ended on 30 November 2019.

== Teams and stadiums ==
Locations of the 2019 Erovnuli Liga 2 teams.

| Team | Location | Venue | Capacity |
|---|---|---|---|
| Gagra | Tbilisi | Mtskheta Park | 2,000 |
| Guria Lanchkhuti | Lanchkhuti | Evgrapi Shevardnadze Stadium | 22,000 |
| Kolkheti-1913 Poti | Poti | Fazisi Stadium | 6,000 |
| Merani Tbilisi | Tbilisi | Sinatle Stadium | 2,500 |
| Samtredia | Samtredia | Erosi Manjgaladze Stadium | 15,000 |
| Shevardeni 1906 | Tbilisi | David Petriashvili Arena | 2,130 |
| Shukura Kobuleti | Kobuleti | Chele Arena | 6,000 |
| Telavi | Telavi | Givi Chokheli Stadium | 12,000 |
| Tskhinvali | Tskhinvali | Poladi Stadium, Rustavi* | 6,200 |
| Zugdidi | Zugdidi | Central Stadium | 2,000 |

'* Tshkinvali are based in South Ossetia and not allowed to play their home games in the area due to safety reasons.

== League table ==
| Pos | Team | Pld | W | D | L | GF | GA | GD | Pts | Promotion, qualification or relegation |
|---|---|---|---|---|---|---|---|---|---|---|
| 1 | Merani Tbilisi (C, P) | 36 | 25 | 6 | 5 | 87 | 35 | +52 | 81 | Promotion to Erovnuli Liga |
| 2 | Samtredia (P) | 36 | 23 | 8 | 5 | 63 | 28 | +35 | 77 | Qualification for Promotion play-offs |
| 3 | Telavi (P) | 36 | 19 | 6 | 11 | 70 | 36 | +34 | 63 | Qualification for Promotion play-offs |
| 4 | Shevardeni 1906 | 36 | 14 | 10 | 12 | 47 | 48 | −1 | 52 | |
| 5 | Gagra | 36 | 13 | 8 | 15 | 46 | 42 | +4 | 47 | |
| 6 | Shukura Kobuleti | 36 | 13 | 7 | 16 | 36 | 46 | −10 | 46 | |
| 7 | Zugdidi | 36 | 13 | 1 | 22 | 38 | 54 | −16 | 40 | |
| 8 | Guria Lanchkhuti (Note: Guria Lanchkhuti were deducted three points.) (R) | 36 | 10 | 6 | 20 | 39 | 64 | −25 | 33 | Qualification for Relegation play-offs |
| 9 | Kolkheti-1913 Poti (Note: Kolkheti-1913 Poti were deducted six points.) (R) | 36 | 10 | 4 | 22 | 31 | 80 | −49 | 28 | Qualification for Relegation play-offs |
| 10 | Tskhinvali (Note: Tskhinvali were deducted six points.) (R) | 36 | 8 | 8 | 20 | 38 | 62 | −24 | 26 | Relegation to Liga 3 |

Source: Erovnuli Liga 2, Soccerway
Rules for classification: 1) Points; 2) Head-to-head points; 3) Head-to-head goal difference; 4) Head-to-head goals scored; 5) Head-to-head away goals scored (only if two teams); 6) Goal difference; 7) Goals scored.
(C) Champions; (P) Promoted; (R) Relegated

== Relegation play-offs ==
4 December 2019
14:00 UTC+4

| Aragvi Dusheti | 0–1 | Guria Lanchkhuti |
|---|---|---|
| | Report | Iagri 10' |

Central Stadium, Dusheti
Referee: Bakur Ninua
10 December 2019
13:30 UTC+4

| Guria Lanchkhuti | 0–2 (a.e.t.) | Aragvi Dusheti |
|---|---|---|
| | Report | Khintibidze 35'; Samadashvili 103' |

Evgrapi Shevardnadze Stadium, Lanchkhuti
Referee: Jener Khorava

Aragvi Dusheti won 2–1 on aggregate.

4 December 2019
14:00 UTC+4

| Kolkheti-1913 Poti | 0–3 | Samgurali Tskaltubo |
|---|---|---|
| | Report | Kakulia 6'; Akhvlediani 37'; Kutchukhidze 77' |

Fazisi Stadium, Poti
Referee: Arsen Nonikashvili
10 December 2019
13:30 UTC+4

| Samgurali Tskaltubo | 6–0 | Kolkheti-1913 Poti |
|---|---|---|
| Apkhazava 25'; Kutchukhidze 42'; Kukhianidze 67', 79'; Akhvlediani 69'; Gazdeliani 87' | Report |

26 May Stadium, Tsqaltubo
Referee: Giorgi Avazashvili

Samgurali Tskaltubo won 9–0 on aggregate.
