= 2012–13 Umaglesi Liga =

Umaglesi Liga
- Season: 2012–13
- Dates: 10 August 2012 – 19 May 2013
- Champions: Dinamo Tbilisi; 14th Georgian title
- Relegated: Kolkheti Poti; Dinamo Batumi
- Champions League: Dinamo Tbilisi
- Europa League: Dila Gori; Torpedo Kutaisi; Chikhura Sachkhere
- Matches: 192
- Goals: 497 (2.59 per match)
- Top goalscorer: Xisco (22)
- Biggest home win: Dila 6–0 Zugdidi
- Biggest away win: Dinamo Batumi 0–3 Dinamo Tbilisi
- Highest scoring: Torpedo 5–4 Dila

The 2012–13 Umaglesi Liga was the 24th season of top-tier football in Georgia. The season began on 10 August 2012 and ended on 19 May 2013.

== Teams ==
=== Stadiums and locations ===
Dinamo Batumi play their home matches in Kobuleti and WIT Georgia in Mtskheta.

Locations of teams in the 2012–13 Umaglesi Liga

Team	Location	Venue	Capacity
Chikhura	Sachkhere	Tsentral	
Dila Gori	Gori	Tengiz Burjanadze Stadium	5,000
Dinamo Batumi	Kobuleti	Chele Arena	6,000
Dinamo Tbilisi	Tbilisi	Boris Paichadze Stadium	54,549
Kolkheti Poti	Poti	Fazisi Stadium	4,000
Merani Martvili	Martvili	Municipal Stadium	2,000
Metalurgi Rustavi	Rustavi	Poladi Stadium	6,000
Sioni Bolnisi	Bolnisi	Tamaz Stephania Stadium	3,000
Torpedo Kutaisi	Kutaisi	Givi Kiladze Stadium	14,700
WIT Georgia	Mtskheta	Mtskheta Park	2,000
Zestaponi	Zestaponi	David Abashidze Stadium	4,558
Zugdidi	Zugdidi	Anaklia Stadium	1,000

== First phase ==
The league began with a regular double-round robin schedule on 8 August 2012. The best six teams qualified for the championship round, which will determine the Georgian champions and the participants for the 2013–14 European competitions. The remaining six teams play in the relegation group, where the top four free will secure places in the 2013–14 competition.

=== League table ===
Pos	Team	Pld	W	D	L	GF	GA	GD	Pts	Qualification
1	Dinamo Tbilisi	22	16	4	2	63	19	+44	52	Qualification to Championship group
2	Dila Gori	22	16	1	5	36	15	+21	49	Qualification to Championship group
3	Torpedo Kutaisi	22	14	3	5	41	18	+23	45	Qualification to Championship group
4	Chikhura Sachkhere	22	13	4	5	35	21	+14	43	Qualification to Championship group
5	Zestaponi	22	11	4	7	30	20	+10	37	Qualification to Championship group
6	Zugdidi	22	10	5	7	27	26	+1	35	Qualification to Championship group
7	Metalurgi Rustavi	22	9	4	9	21	26	−5	31	Qualification to Relegation group
8	Merani Martvili	22	7	2	13	23	36	−13	23	Qualification to Relegation group
9	WIT Georgia	22	5	7	10	15	29	−14	22	Qualification to Relegation group
10	Sioni Bolnisi	22	4	6	12	14	38	−24	18	Qualification to Relegation group
11	Dinamo Batumi	22	3	4	15	22	47	−25	13	Qualification to Relegation group
12	Kolkheti Poti	22	0	4	18	11	43	−32	4	Qualification to Relegation group

Source: GFF
Rules for classification: 1) points; 2) goal difference; 3) number of goals scored.

=== Results ===
Home \ Away	CHI	DIL	DBA	DIN	KOL	MER	MET	SIO	TKU	WIT	ZES	ZUG
Chikhura Sachkhere		0–2	3–0	0–0	2–1	1–0	1–0	2–1	0–0	4–0	3–1	2–0
Dila Gori	2–3		2–0	2–0	1–0	2–1	3–0	2–3	0–1	0–1	1–0	3–0
Dinamo Batumi	0–2	1–2		0–3	3–1	4–0	0–2	0–1	0–2	0–1	3–3	0–4
Dinamo Tbilisi	5–2	3–0	5–3		5–0	3–1	3–0	7–2	3–2	5–0	2–1	2–0
Kolkheti Poti	0–2	0–3	1–2	0–2		0–1	2–3	0–1	1–1	1–1	0–2	1–1
Merani Martvili	1–0	2–3	3–1	0–4	4–0		0–0	1–0	3–0	1–0	0–3	1–2
Metalurgi Rustavi	1–1	0–2	2–1	0–1	2–1	1–0		1–0	0–4	0–2	1–1	5–1
Sioni Bolnisi	0–3	0–2	2–2	0–5	0–0	2–1	0–0		0–2	1–1	0–2	0–0
Torpedo Kutaisi	3–1	0–1	5–1	2–2	2–1	4–0	1–0	4–1		2–0	1–0	1–0
WIT Georgia	0–1	0–2	1–1	1–1	2–0	0–0	0–1	0–0	1–3		2–3	0–0
Zestaponi	0–0	0–1	0–0	2–1	2–1	3–1	0–1	1–0	1–0	1–2		1–0
Zugdidi	4–2	0–0	2–0	1–1	1–0	3–2	2–1	2–0	2–1	2–0	0–3	

Source: GFF
Legend: Blue = home team win; Yellow = draw; Red = away team win.

== Second phase ==
This phase began on 9 March 2013 and will end on 18 May 2013.

=== Championship round ===
Dinamo Tbilisi, Dila Gori, Torpedo Kutaisi, Chikhura Sachkhere, Zestaponi and Baia Zugdidi ended the first phase in the top six positions of the table and thus entered the championship round.

The results of the matches among these teams will be used as a base ranking. Each team will then play another double round-robin schedule against every other team.

==== Table ====
Pos	Team	Pld	W	D	L	GF	GA	GD	Pts	Qualification
1	Dinamo Tbilisi (C)	32	24	6	2	88	23	+65	78	Qualification for the Champions League second qualifying round
2	Dila Gori	32	22	2	8	60	26	+34	68	Qualification for the Europa League second qualifying round (Note: Dinamo Tbilisi, the winners of the 2012–13 Georgian Cup, qualified for the Champions League, so 2nd-placed Dila Gori qualified for the second qualifying round of UEFA Europa League and cup runners-up Chikhura Sachkhere took the first qualifying round spot.)
3	Torpedo Kutaisi	32	19	7	6	57	30	+27	64	Qualification for the Europa League first qualifying round
4	Chikhura Sachkhere	32	17	6	9	49	38	+11	57	Qualification for the Europa League first qualifying round
5	Zestaponi	32	12	6	14	35	38	−3	42	
6	Zugdidi	32	10	6	16	31	52	−21	36	

Source: Soccerway
Rules for classification: 1) points; 2) head-to-head points; 3) head-to-head goal difference; 4) head-to-head goals scored; 5) goal difference; 6) number of goals scored.
(C) Champions

==== Results ====
Home \ Away	CHI	DIL	DIN	TKU	ZES	ZUG
Chikhura Sachkhere		1–2	2–4	1–1	1–0	2–1
Dila Gori	4–0		0–1	1–2	2–1	6–0
Dinamo Tbilisi	3–0	0–0		4–0	6–1	3–0
Torpedo Kutaisi	0–0	5–4	1–1		1–0	2–0
Zestaponi	1–4	0–3	0–1	0–0		2–0
Zugdidi	1–3	1–2	0–2	1–4	0–0	

Source: Soccerway
Legend: Blue = home team win; Yellow = draw; Red = away team win.

=== Relegation round ===
Metalurgi Rustavi, Merani Martvili, WIT Georgia, Sioni Bolnisi, Dinamo Batumi and Kolkheti Poti and finished seventh through twelfth and thus entered the promotion/relegation round.

Each team will play another double round-robin schedule against every other team. The last two teams of this round will play in the Pirveli Liga in the 2013–14 season.

==== Table ====
Pos	Team	Pld	W	D	L	GF	GA	GD	Pts	Relegation
7	Metalurgi Rustavi	32	12	8	12	29	35	−6	44	
8	Merani Martvili	32	10	4	18	31	51	−20	34	
9	WIT Georgia	32	8	9	15	25	42	−17	33 (Note: Head-to-head record: Sioni Bolnisi–WIT Georgia 1–1, WIT Georgia–Sioni Bolnisi 0–0, WIT Georgia–Sioni Bolnisi 0–2, Sioni Bolnisi–WIT Georgia 0–3.)	
10	Sioni Bolnisi	32	8	9	15	31	51	−20	33	
11	Dinamo Batumi (R)	32	8	7	17	39	55	−16	31	Relegation to Pirveli Liga
12	Kolkheti Poti (R)	32	3	8	21	22	56	−34	17	Relegation to Pirveli Liga

Source: Soccerway
Rules for classification: 1) points; 2) head-to-head points; 3) head-to-head goal difference; 4) head-to-head goals scored; 5) goal difference; 6) number of goals scored.
(R) Relegated

==== Results ====
Home \ Away	DBA	KOL	MET	MER	SIO	WIT
Dinamo Batumi		2–2	0–1	6–0	1–1	2–0
Kolkheti Poti	1–1		0–0	1–2	2–1	2–0
Metalurgi Rustavi	0–1	1–0		1–1	0–0	0–2
Merani Martvili	0–1	0–1	1–0		1–2	2–0
Sioni Bolnisi	0–1	6–2	2–2	3–1		0–3
WIT Georgia	3–2	0–0	2–3	0–0	0–2	

Source: Soccerway
Legend: Blue = home team win; Yellow = draw; Red = away team win.

== See also ==
- 2012–13 Georgian Cup
