= Mate Vatsadze =

Georgian footballer (born 1988)

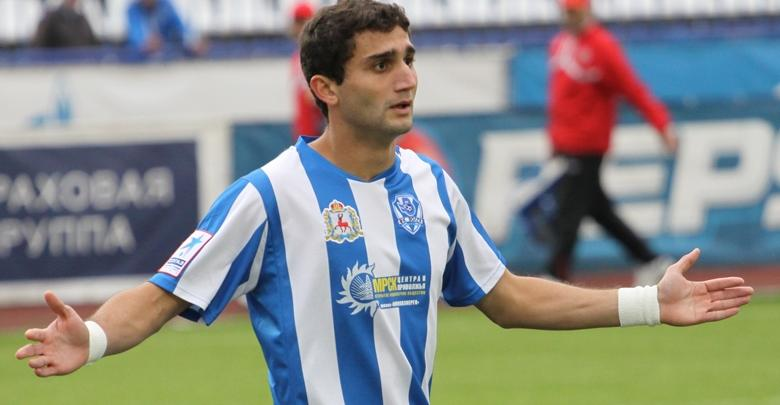
- Vatsadze with Volga Nizhny Novgorod in 2011

Personal information
- Date of birth: 17 December 1988 (age 37)
- Place of birth: Tbilisi, Georgia
- Height: 1.83 m (6 ft 0 in)
- Position: Forward

Team information
- Current team: Dinamo Tbilisi
- Number: 11

Senior career*
| Years | Team | Apps | (Gls) |
| 2004–2008 | Dinamo-2 Tbilisi | 53 | (21) |
| 2005–2010 | Dinamo Tbilisi | 96 | (42) |
| 2011–2012 | Volga Nizhny Novgorod | 20 | (1) |
| 2012 | Dila Gori | 15 | (13) |
| 2012–2016 | AGF | 75 | (29) |
| 2016 | Locomotive Tbilisi | 4 | (1) |
| 2017 | Viborg | 8 | (0) |
| 2017–2018 | Silkeborg | 15 | (3) |
| 2018 | Dinamo Tbilisi | 12 | (2) |
| 2019 | FK Liepāja | 2 | (0) |
| 2019 | Qizilqum | 12 | (3) |
| 2020 | AGMK | 21 | (5) |
| 2021 | Qizilqum | 26 | (5) |
| 2022 | Gagra | 19 | (6) |
| 2022–2023 | Dinamo Batumi | 29 | (5) |
| 2024 | Gagra | 18 | (5) |
| 2024– | Dinamo Tbilisi | 44 | (11) |

International career
| 2008–2010 | Georgia U21 | 5 | (1) |
| 2009–2016 | Georgia | 15 | (4) |
- * Club domestic league appearances and goals as of 17:51, 22 May 2026 (UTC)

Mate Vatsadze (Georgian: მათე ვაწაძე, Maté Vats'adze, born 17 December 1988) is a Georgian football player who plays for Erovnuli Liga club Dinamo Tbilisi as a forward.

== Playing career ==
Vatsadze started his professional career with FC Dinamo Tbilisi, playing 96 games and scoring 42 goals for the first team between 2005 and 2010, before moving to FC Volga Nizhny Novgorod to play in the Russian Premier League in 2011. While playing in Russia, he was called up for the Georgia national football team, to play in the Euro 2012 qualifying matches against Croatia and Israel, but he was not able to get the required visa. So he soon returned to Georgia to join Dila Gori at the end of the season. On 2 September 2012 he signed a 3 1/2-year contract with Danish Superliga side AGF.

Vatsadze was discovered by AGF in the 2012–13 Europa League Second qualifying round where he impressed by scoring three goals for Dila Gori against AGF and went on to score twice in the Third qualifying round away leg in Cyprus against Anorthosis, to help Dila Gori progress to the Play-off round. Vatsadze also scored twice in the 2010–11 UEFA Europa League Second qualifying round, helping Dinamo Tbilisi to eliminate Swedish Gefle IF, when they managed to beat them both home and away. He also scored a goal for Dinamo Tbilisi in the 2009–10 UEFA Europa League Third qualifying round, in the away leg against Red Star Belgrade.

Vatsadze joined FK Liepāja in Latvia in January 2019.

After three seasons spent at two Uzbek clubs, Vatsadze returned home in February 2022 first to join Gagra. In the summer of 2022, he signed with reigning Georgian champions Dinamo Batumi, who claimed another top title the next year.

Having played another half season at Gagra, in September 2024 Vatsadze returned to Dinamo Tbilisi after a six-year break on a deal until the end of the year.

== Statistics ==
=== Club ===
As of match played 1 June 2024

Appearances and goals by club, season and competition
| Club | Season | League | | | National cup | | Continental | | Other | | Total | |
| Club | Season | Division | Apps | Goals | Apps | Goals | Apps | Goals | Apps | Goals | Apps | Goals |
|---|---|---|---|---|---|---|---|---|---|---|---|---|
| Dinamo Tbilisi | 2008/09 | Umaglesi Liga | | | | | 3 (Note: Appearances in UEFA Champions League qualifiers) | 0 | | | 3 | 0 |
| Dinamo Tbilisi | 2009/10 | Umaglesi Liga | 27 | 10 | 3 | 2 | 4 (Note: Appearances in UEFA Europa League qualifiers) | 1 | – | | 34 | 13 |
| Dinamo Tbilisi | 2010/11 | Umaglesi Liga | 8 | 2 | – | | 5 | 2 | – | | 13 | 4 |
| Dinamo Tbilisi | 2018 | Umaglesi Liga | 12 | 2 | 1 | 0 | 2 | 0 | – | | 15 | 2 |
| Dinamo Tbilisi | Total | | 47 | 14 | 4 | 2 | 14 | 3 | 0 | 0 | 65 | 19 |
| Volga | 2011/12 | RPL | 20 | 1 | 1 | 0 | – | | – | | 21 | 1 |
| Dila | 2011/12 | Umaglesi Liga | 13 | 11 | 3 | 3 | 5 | 5 | – | | 21 | 19 |
| Dila | 2012/13 | Umaglesi Liga | 2 | 2 | – | | – | | – | | 2 | 2 |
| Dila | Total | | 15 | 13 | 3 | 3 | 5 | 5 | 0 | 0 | 23 | 21 |
| Aarhus | 2012/13 | Danish Superliga | 13 | 3 | 1 | 0 | – | | – | | 14 | 3 |
| Aarhus | 2013/14 | Danish Superliga | 10 | 1 | 1 | 0 | – | | – | | 11 | 1 |
| Aarhus | 2014/15 | Danish First Division | 32 | 20 | – | | – | | – | | 32 | 20 |
| Aarhus | 2015/16 | Danish Superliga | 20 | 5 | – | | – | | – | | 20 | 5 |
| Aarhus | Total | | 75 | 29 | 2 | 0 | 0 | 0 | 0 | 0 | 77 | 29 |
| Locomotive | 2016 | Umaglesi Liga | 4 | 1 | – | | – | | – | | 4 | 1 |
| Viborg | 2016/17 | Danish Superliga | 7 | 0 | – | | – | | 1 (Note: Appearances in Danish league playoffs) | 0 | 8 | 0 |
| Viborg | 2017/18 | Danish First Division | 1 | 0 | – | | – | | – | | 1 | 0 |
| Viborg | Total | | 8 | 0 | 0 | 0 | 0 | 0 | 1 | 0 | 9 | 0 |
| Silkeborg | 2017/18 | Danish Superliga | 15 | 3 | 2 | 0 | – | | – | | 17 | 3 |
| FK Liepāja | 2019 | Virsliga | 2 | 0 | – | | – | | – | | 2 | 0 |
| Qizilqum | 2019 | Super League | 12 | 3 | 1 | 0 | – | | – | | 13 | 3 |
| Qizilqum | 2021 | Super League | 26 | 5 | 3 | 0 | – | | – | | 29 | 5 |
| Qizilqum | Total | | 38 | 8 | 4 | 0 | 0 | 0 | 2 | 0 | 42 | 8 |
| AGMK | 2020 | Super League | 21 | 5 | 4 | 2 | – | | – | | 25 | 7 |
| Gagra | 2022 | Erovnuli Liga | 19 | 6 | – | | – | | – | | 19 | 6 |
| Gagra | 2024 | Erovnuli Liga | 18 | 5 | – | | – | | – | | 18 | 5 |
| Gagra | Total | | 37 | 11 | 0 | 0 | 0 | 0 | 0 | 0 | 37 | 11 |
| Dinamo Batumi | 2022 | Erovnuli Liga | 15 | 4 | 1 | 0 | 2 +2 (Note: Appearances in UEFA Europa Conference League qualifiers) | 1 | – | | 20 | 5 |
| Dinamo Batumi | 2023 | Erovnuli Liga | 14 | 1 | 3 | 1 | 1 | 0 | 2 (Note: Appearances in Georgian Super Cup) | 0 | 20 | 2 |
| Dinamo Batumi | Total | | 29 | 5 | 4 | 1 | 5 | 1 | 2 | 0 | 40 | 7 |
| Career total | | | 311 | 90 | 24 | 8 | 24 | 9 | 3 | 0 | 362 | 107 |

=== International goals ===
Scores and results list Georgia's goal tally first.

| No | Date | Venue | Opponent | Score | Result | Competition |
|---|---|---|---|---|---|---|
| 1. | 6 February 2013 | Qemal Stafa Stadium, Tirana, Albania | Albania | 1–1 | 2–1 | Friendly |
| 2. | 9 June 2015 | Linzer Stadion, Linz, Austria | Ukraine | 1–2 | 1–2 | Friendly |
| 3. | 8 October 2015 | Boris Paichadze Dinamo Arena, Tbilisi, Georgia | Gibraltar | 1–0 | 4–0 | UEFA Euro 2016 qualification |
| 4. | 8 October 2015 | Boris Paichadze Dinamo Arena, Tbilisi, Georgia | Gibraltar | 3–0 | 4–0 | UEFA Euro 2016 qualification |

== Honours ==
Dinamo Batumi

- Erovnuli Liga: 2023

Dinamo Tbilisi

- Umaglesi Liga: 2007–08
- Georgian Cup: 2008–09
- Georgian Super Cup: 2008

Dila Gori

- Georgian Cup: 2011–12

AGF

- Danish First Division: Promoted 2014–15
- Danish Cup: Runner-up 2015–16
