= Ustaritz Aldekoaotalora =

Spanish footballer (born 1983)

Ustaritz
Personal information
- Full name: Ustaritz Aldekoaotalora Astarloa
- Date of birth: 16 February 1983 (age 43)
- Place of birth: Abadiño, Spain
- Height: 1.80 m (5 ft 11 in)
- Position: Centre-back

Youth career
- 1999–2001: Athletic Bilbao

Senior career*
Years	Team	Apps	(Gls)
2001–2003	Basconia	40	(1)
2003–2005	Bilbao Athletic	57	(0)
2005–2012	Athletic Bilbao	85	(1)
2011–2012	→ Betis (loan)	7	(0)
2013–2014	Dinamo Tbilisi	14	(1)
2014–2015	Arouca	2	(0)
2015	Penafiel	7	(0)
Total		212	(3)
- * Club domestic league appearances and goals

Ustaritz Aldekoaotalora Astarloa (born 16 February 1983), known simply as Ustaritz, is a Spanish former professional footballer who played as a central defender.

Most of his career was spent with Athletic Bilbao, for which he appeared in 103 official matches in seven years. In 2013, he won the double with Georgian club Dinamo Tbilisi.

== Club career ==
=== Athletic Bilbao ===
Born in Abadiño, Biscay, Lezama youth graduate Ustaritz made his debut with Athletic Bilbao's first team during the 2005–06 season, taking part in 17 La Liga matches. However, he featured irregularly in the subsequent years, being mainly restricted to appearances in the Copa del Rey and the UEFA Cup; in the 2007–08 campaign he played a career-best 20 games, but the Basques could only finish in 11th position.

From 2008 to 2011, Ustaritz totalled 36 league games, scoring his only competitive goal for the club on 29 November 2009 in a 4–1 away win against UD Almería. In mid-August 2011, he was loaned to fellow top-division Real Betis in a season-long move, after manager Joaquín Caparrós accused him of unprofessional behaviours such as feigning injury.

Ustaritz's contract with Athletic was terminated by mutual consent on 31 August 2012.

=== Dinamo Tbilisi ===
In February 2013, the 30-year-old Ustaritz moved abroad for the first time, signing with FC Dinamo Tbilisi in Georgia and sharing teams with several compatriots. He played six Premier League games until the end of the season as his team won the national championship, scoring in a 6–1 victory over FC Zestaponi in the last fixture on 18 May. Four days later, a double was secured with a 3–1 defeat of FC Chikhura Sachkhere in the Georgian Cup final, with the player being dismissed late on.

Ustaritz recorded two goals in four matches in Dinamo's third-qualifying round run in the UEFA Champions League in the summer, heading home from assists by his compatriot Xisco Muñoz.

=== Later career ===
On 30 January 2014, Ustaritz returned to the Iberian Peninsula, signing an eighteen-month deal at Primeira Liga club F.C. Arouca. Roughly one year later, after only two appearances, he switched to another side in the same division, F.C. Penafiel.

== Honours ==
Dinamo Tbilisi

- Georgian Premier League: 2012–13
- Georgian Cup: 2012–13
