= List of football stadiums in Georgia (country) =

The following is a list of football/rugby stadiums in Georgia, ranked in order of capacity, with the minimum capacity being 1,000.

== Current stadiums ==
#	Image	Stadium	Capacity	City	Home team	Opened	UEFA rank
1		Boris Paitchadze Dinamo Arena	54,549	Tbilisi	Georgia national football team, Georgia national rugby union team, FC Dinamo Tbilisi	1976	4/4 stars
2		Mikheil Meskhi Stadium	27,223	Tbilisi	FC Iberia 1999	1952	3/4 stars
3		Adjarabet Arena	20,035	Batumi	FC Dinamo Batumi	2020	4/4 stars
4		Ramaz Shengelia Stadium	11,700	Kutaisi	FC Torpedo Kutaisi	1956	4/4 stars
5		Poladi Stadium	6,000	Rustavi	FC Metalurgi Rustavi	1984	
6		Tengiz Burjanadze Stadium	5,000	Gori	FC Dila Gori	2012	2/4 stars
7		Chele Arena	5,000	Kobuleti	FC Shukura Kobuleti	2012	
8		David Abashidze Stadium	4,600	Zestaponi	FC Zestaponi	1952	
9		Jemal Zeinklishvili Stadium	4,000	Borjomi	FC Borjomi	?	
10		Tamaz Stephania Stadium	3,242	Bolnisi	FC Sioni Bolnisi	?	
11		David Petriashvili Stadium	3,000	Tbilisi	none	2015	
12		Grigol Jomartidze Stadium	2,100	Khashuri	FC Iveria Khashuri	1933	
13		Mtskheta Park	2,000	Mtskheta	FC WIT Georgia	2011	
14		Mikheil Meskhi Stadium-2	2,000	Tbilisi	Lokomotive Tbilisi		
15		Marneuli Stadium	2,000	Marneuli	FC Algeti Marneuli	2024	
16		Anaklia Stadium	1,000	Anaklia	FC Zugdidi	2012	

== More stadiums ==
#	Image	Stadium	Capacity	City	Home team	Opened
1		Givi Chokheli Stadium	12,000	Telavi	none	?
2		Temur Maghradze Stadium	11,650	Chiatura	FC Chiatura	1964
3		Fazisi Stadium	6,000	Poti	FC Kolkheti Poti	2012
4		Vladimer Bochorishvili Stadium	6,000	Tkibuli	FC Meshakhte Tkibuli	
5		Mikheil Iadze Stadium	5,000	Akhaltsikhe	FC Meskheti Akhaltsikhe	?
6		Evgrapi Shevardnadze Stadium	4,500	Lanchkhuti	FC Guria Lanchkhuti	1987
7		David Kipiani Stadium	3,000	Gurjaani	FC Alazani Gurjaani	?

== Under construction ==
#	Image	Stadium	Capacity	City	Home team	Open
1		Zugdidi Stadium	7,200	Zugdidi	FC Zugdidi	2020

== See also ==
- List of European stadiums by capacity
- List of association football stadiums by capacity
- Lists of stadiums
