= Central Stadium (Tbilisi) =

Stadium in Tbilisi, Georgia

- Central Stadium
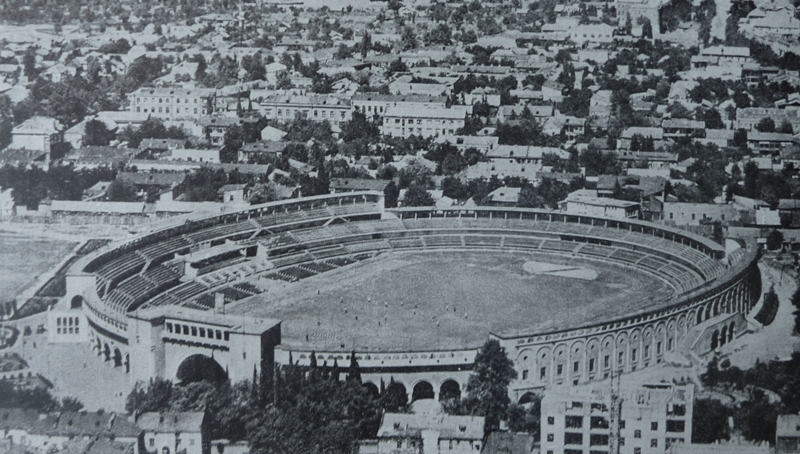
- Interactive map of Central Stadium
- Full name: Central Stadium
- Location: Tbilisi, Georgia
- Coordinates: 41°43′22″N 44°47′24″E
- Capacity: 35,000

Construction
- Opened: 1935
- Renovated: 1956
- Closed: 1976
- Architect: Archil Kurdiani

Tenant
- FC Dinamo Tbilisi (1935–1976)

Central Stadium (ცენტრალური სტადიონი) was a multi-purpose stadium in Tbilisi, Georgia. Its official name between 1937 and 1953 was the Beria Dinamo Stadium which it was named in honor of Lavrentiy Beria. It was the home ground of the Dinamo Tbilisi until the current Boris Paichadze Dinamo Arena opened in 1976. The stadium held 35,000 spectators.
