= Tornike Gorgiashvili =

Georgian footballer

Personal information
- Date of birth: 27 April 1988 (age 38)
- Place of birth: Tbilisi, Georgia
- Height: 1.84 m (6 ft 1/2 in)
- Position: Midfielder

Senior career*
Years	Team	Apps	(Gls)
2004–2005	Tbilisi		
2005–2013	Zestaponi	128	(24)
2014	Dinamo Tbilisi	7	(0)
2014–2015	Samtredia	25	(4)
2015–2016	Tskhinvali	22	(3)
2016	Samtredia	0	(0)
2016–2017	Chikhura Sachkhere	42	(7)
2018–2019	Saburtalo	62	(5)
2020	Dila Gori	7	(0)
2021	Sioni Bolnisi	20	(1)

International career
2011–2013	Georgia	4	(0)
- * Club domestic league appearances and goals

Tornike Gorgiashvili (Georgian: თორნიკე გორგიაშვილი; born 27 April 1988) is a Georgian former footballer.

On 1 July 2010, he scored in the Europa League 2010-11 against S.C. Faetano.
