= FC Aeti Sokhumi =

Aeti Sokhumi
- Full name: FC Aeti Sokhumi
- Founded: 2011; 15 years ago
- Dissolved: 2013 13 years ago
- Manager: Omar Sokhadze
- League: N/A
Home colours	Away colours

Football Club Aeti Sokhumi is a Georgian football club based in Tbilisi. They play in the Pirveli Liga.

== Current squad ==
Note: Flags indicate national team as defined under FIFA eligibility rules; some limited exceptions apply. Players may hold more than one non-FIFA nationality.

No.	Pos.	Nation	Player
—	GK	GEO	Lasha Eziashvili
—	GK	GEO	Giorgi Tskhakaia
—	DF	GEO	Lado Chezhia
—	DF	GEO	Levan Bitsadze
—	DF	GEO	Tornike Metreveli
—	DF	GEO	Giorgi Bagalishvili
—	DF	GEO	Giorgi Kuljanishvili
—	DF	GEO	Levan Jobava
—	MF	GEO	Giorgi Vasadze

No.	Pos.	Nation	Player
—	MF	GEO	Diego Lobzhanidze
—	MF	GEO	Pavle Kvikvinia
—	MF	GEO	Guram Bakuradze
—	MF	GEO	Giorgi Narsia
—	MF	GEO	Nodar Mamrashi
—	FW	GEO	Giorgi Jachvliani
—	FW	GEO	Lasha Arakishvili
—	FW	GEO	Nikoloz Zakariadze
—	FW	GEO	Giorgi Margiani
