= Gulia Tutberidze Stadium =

Multi-use stadium in Zugdidi, Georgia

Coordinates: 42°30′32″N 41°52′26″E

- Interactive map of Gulia Tutberidze Stadium
- Full name: Gulia Tutberidze Stadium
- Location: Zugdidi, Georgia
- Capacity: 7,000

Construction
- Built: 1931
- Closed: 2011
- Demolished: 2012

Tenant
- FC Baia Zugdidi

Gulia Tutberidze Stadium (Georgian: გულია თუთბერიძის სტადიონი) was a multi-use sports stadium in Zugdidi, Georgia.

The stadium was originally constructed in 1931 and was primarily used for football matches. It served as the home ground of the local football club Zugdidi. When first built, it had a capacity of about 7,500 spectators. After later reconstruction, its capacity was reduced to around 5,000.

In the autumn of 2011, the stadium was demolished. The site was merged into the recreational park of the Dadiani Palace, to which the territory had historically belonged. Plans were announced to renovate and expand the park area as part of the city’s cultural heritage development.
