= Irakli Kobalia =

Georgian footballer

Personal information
- Full name: Irakli Kobalia
- Date of birth: 13 March 1992 (age 34)
- Place of birth: Senaki, Georgia
- Height: 1.85 m (6 ft 1 in)
- Position: Striker

Team information
- Current team: Guria Lanchkhuti

Senior career*
Years	Team	Apps	(Gls)
2010–2013	Zugdidi	44	(17)
2011	→ Metalurgi Rustavi (on loan)	0	(0)
2013–2014	Zestaponi	8	(4)
2014–2015	Kolkheti Khobi	12	(5)
2015–2016	Zugdidi	12	(1)
2016–	Guria Lanchkhuti	0	(0)

International career
2011	Georgia U21	5	(1)
2012	Georgia	1	(0)
- * Club domestic league appearances and goals as of 20 July 2016

Irakli Kobalia (born 13 March 1992) is a Georgian association football player, who plays as a striker for Guria Lanchkhuti in the Umaglesi Liga.

== Career ==
Kobalia started his career with Baia, before transferring to Rustavi in 2011. He was a starter in Rustavi's first 2011–12 UEFA Europa League qualifying phase and play-off round against Armenian club Banants F.C. in which Rustavi won the opening leg 1–0, with Kobalia scoring the only goal in the 48th minute.
