= Evgrapi Shevardnadze Stadium =

Multi-use stadium in Lanchkhuti, Georgia

Coordinates: 42°05′41″N 42°02′52″E

Evgrapi Shevardnadze Stadium ევგრაფი შევარდნაძის სტადიონი
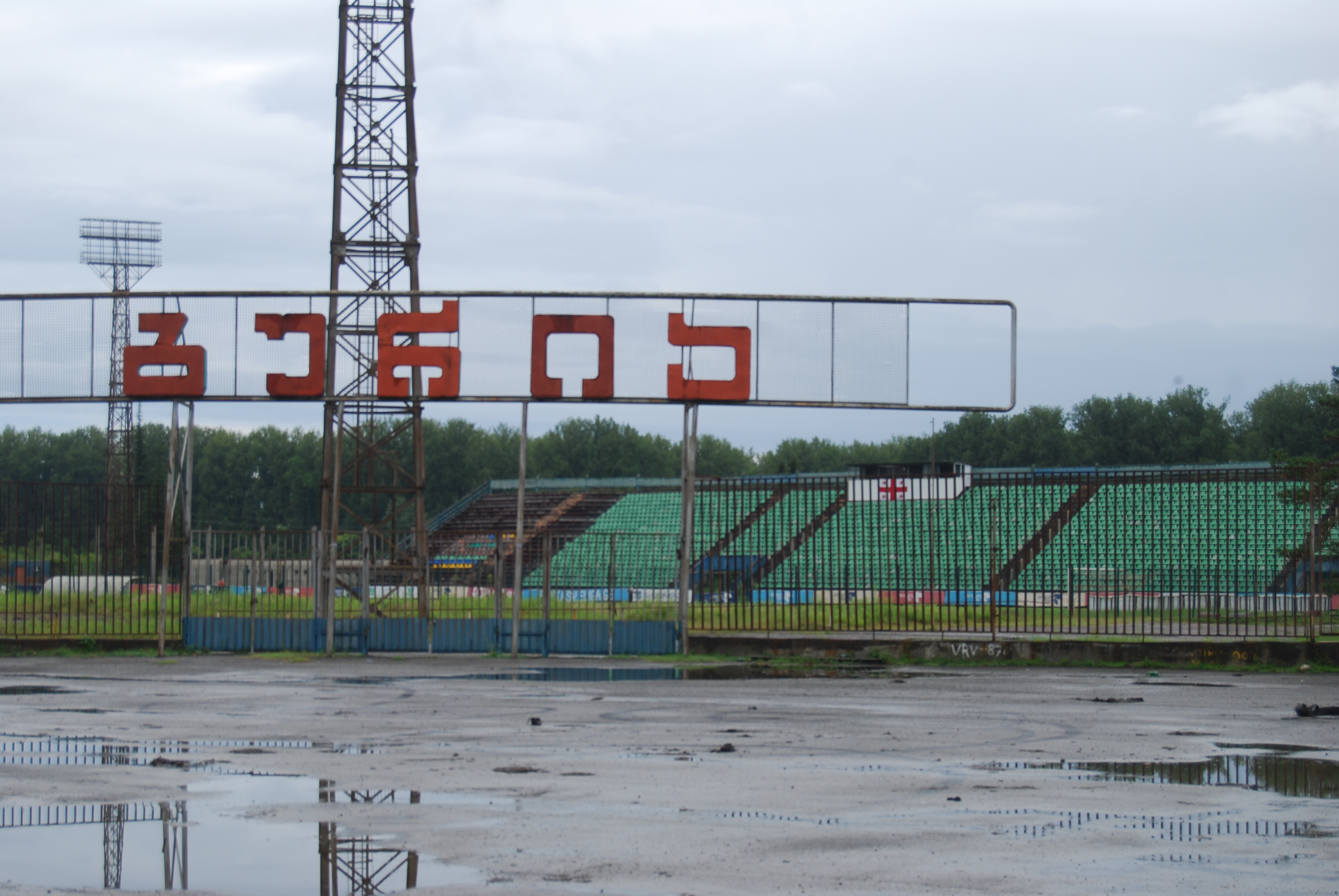
- Interactive map of Evgrapi Shevardnadze Stadium ევგრაფი შევარდნაძის სტადიონი
- Location: (Georgia (country)) Lanchkhuti, Georgia
- Owner: Government of Georgia
- Capacity: 4,500 (3,030 seats)
- Surface: Grass
- Scoreboard: Yes
- Field size: 105 m × 70 m (344 ft × 230 ft)

Tenant
- FC Guria Lanchkhuti

Evgrapi Shevardnadze Stadium is a multi-use stadium in Lanchkhuti, Georgia used mostly for football matches. It is the home stadium of FC Guria Lanchkhuti able to hold 4,500 people.

Named after Evgrapi Shevardnadze, head of the district government during Guria's ascending years in the 1970-80s and elder brother of Eduard Shevardnadze, the arena was initially envisaged for 5 000 visitors gradually extended to 10 000. After 1986, when Guria secured promotion to the top Soviet League, the stadium sustained a major reconstruction with its capacity reaching 22,000. It became the third largest stadium in Georgia after Boris Paichadze Dinamo Arena and Mikheil Meskhi Stadium, both located in Tbilisi.

After the 1990s three of the four stands were demolished. A partial reconstruction got under way in 2012, but initial plans to increase the number of seats to 10,000 never materialized. By 2015, 3,000 individual seats had been installed.

In October 2018, a special ceremony dedicated to Evgrapi Shevardnadze took place in the stadium, where his bust was opened.

A year later, the local authorities pledged to finally solve all existing problems regarding the stadium, but with Guria settled in tier 3 of the national league, no reconstruction project was launched.

== See also ==
Stadiums in Georgia
