= Fazisi Stadium =

Stadium in Kutaisi, Georgia

Coordinates: 42°08′33″N 41°39′56″E

Pazisi ფაზისი
- Interactive map of Pazisi ფაზისი
- Location: Poti, Georgia
- Owner: Government of Georgia
- Capacity: 6,000
- Surface: Grass
- Scoreboard: Yes
- Field size: 105 m × 68 m (344 ft × 223 ft)

Construction
- Built: 1961
- Renovated: 2022

Tenant
- Kolkheti 1913

The Fazisi Stadium is a multi-use stadium in Poti, Georgia. It is used mostly for football matches and is the home stadium of Erovnuli Liga club Kolkheti 1913. It is able to hold 6,000 people.

== History ==
The arena was inaugurated in 1961 when the first stadium with a capacity for 6,000 spectators was built on this site.

In 2013, two tenders regarding the reconstruction were announced, but after contractor organizations failed to meet their obligations, there were court hearings between them and the Poti City Hall. Meanwhile, the club had to relocate to other cities before being able to host their first game in October 2019. At this stage, the stadium had one stand with the capacity of 1,700.

On 3 December 2020, when the candidacies of Georgia and Romania to host the 2023 U21 European Championship were confirmed by UEFA, the port city of Poti, on the Black Sea, was also chosen as the venue.

In order to meet UEFA Category 3 requirements, three more stands were to be built. Although initially it seemed as though works could be completed in time, only northern and southern stands were constructed with 3,000 seats combined.

During these eight years, 8.5₾ million (~€2.8 million) were spent to make the arena compatible with international standards, but it still fell short of this goal. In January 2022, UEFA finally removed the Fazisi stadium from the list in favour of the Ramaz Shengelia Stadium located in Kutaisi. Furthermore, when Kolkheti 1913 returned to the Erovnuli Liga after a six-year absence in 2024, they were still unable to use it as their home ground for an entire season due to some deficiencies, including a poor state of pitch.

The facility features three bleachers, a natural grass play area, and a lighting system. The main grandstand is covered with an arch-shaped structure. The two rear stands of the goal are open-air. There is a scoreboard installed in the west stand behind the goal. The plastic seats bear the club's colors, white and blue. Behind the rows is a training ground with artificial turf and a small grandstand with two rows of seats.

== See also ==
- Stadiums in Georgia
