= David Abashidze Stadium =

Georgian sports stadium

Coordinates: 42.1112131°N 43.0256796°E

Davit Abashidze Stadium დავით აბაშიძის სტადიონი
- Zestaponi Stadium
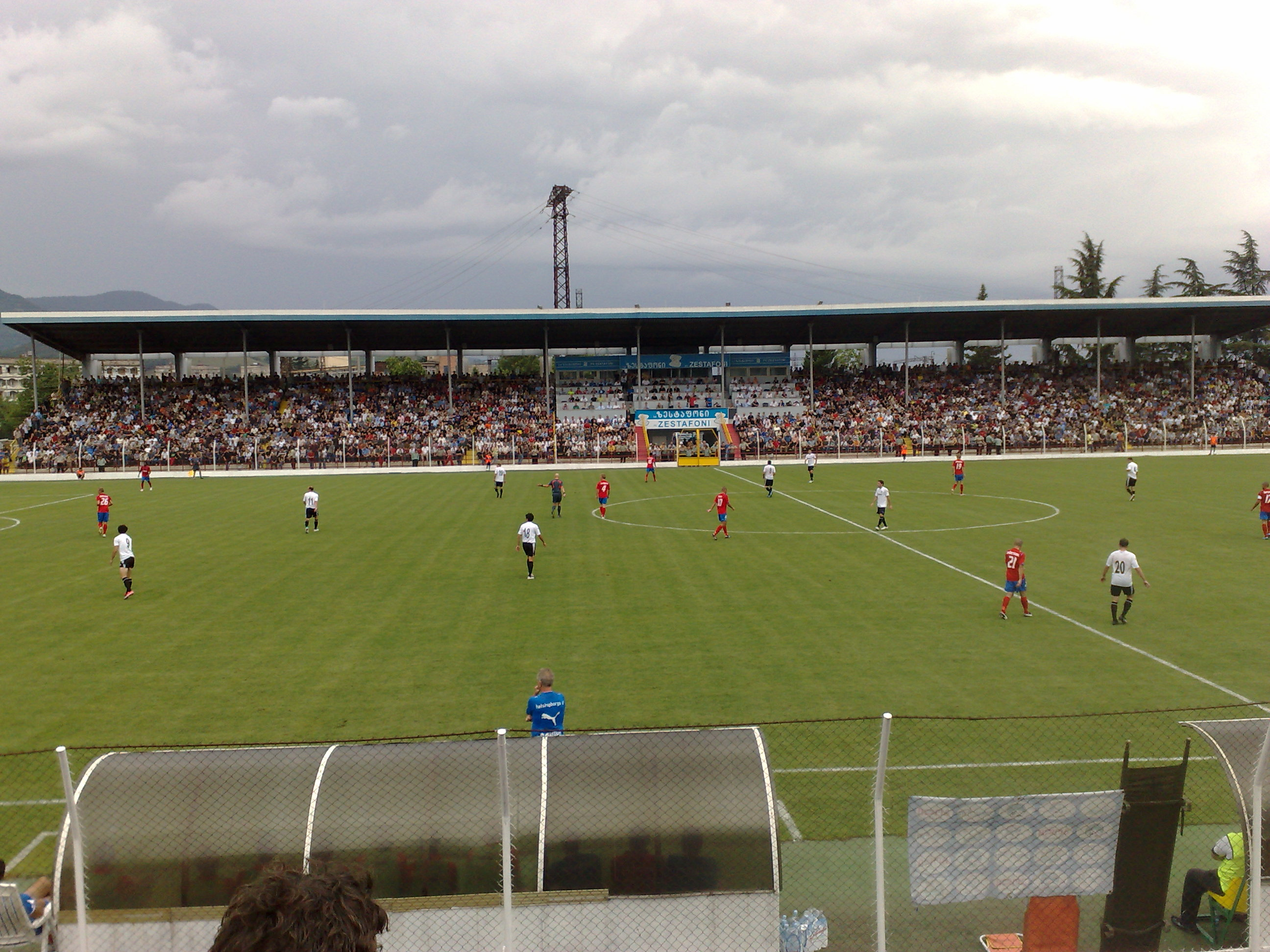
- Interactive map of Davit Abashidze Stadium დავით აბაშიძის სტადიონი
- Location: (Georgia (country)) Zestaponi, Georgia
- Owner: FC Zestaponi
- Capacity: 4,558
- Surface: Grass
- Scoreboard: Yes
- Field size: 105 m × 70 m (344 ft × 230 ft)

Tenants
- FC Zestaponi; Margveti 2006

David Abashidze Stadium is a multi-use stadium in Zestaponi, Georgia. It is used mostly for football matches and is the home stadium of FC Zestaponi. The stadium is able to hold 4,100 people and opened in 1952. Zestaponi David Abashidze Stadium (former Central Stadium) was built by the Zestaponi Ferro-alloy Plant. A couple of matches were held on the stadium before its opening in 1951.

In 1952–1989, the Georgian Soviet Championship team Metalurgi held matches on the Zestaponi central stadium. In 1990–1998, the latter was a home arena for Margveti while Metalurgi became its tenants during the next five-year period.

Between 2004 and 2025, FC Zestaponi held home matches in the stadium. In 2026, fellow municipal club Margveti 2006 started using this ground for their league games.

In 1981, reconstruction work was done on the arena; the west stand was roofed and the east stand was constructed. After these works capacity of the stadium increased to 8000 seats.

In 2004, after establishing FC Zestaponi, central stadium was repaired and is still being repaired to renew the arena and comply with international standards.

In 2005, works were done to renew the grass surface on the stadium. Georgian workers have constructed new drainage system of German technology. The field is watered with a watering system from an American Company “Rainbird”. (This watering system was successfully used on eight stadiums during the 2004 European Championship in Portugal.)

On the Zestaponi central stadium, the field surface, “Natural Green Carpet”, was made by the Ukrainian firm “Lidia-Park”.

FC Zestaponi management plans to build a new base for the club. Some new football fields have been constructed in Zestaponi (among them one with an artificial surface). Relevant infrastructure is being made – work out rooms are being repaired, building of new tribunes with personal seats is planned, along with the installment of a modern score-board.

On 9 April 2010 the Stadium was named after David Abashidze who contributed tremendously to the development and revival of football in Zestaponi.

Capacity of the stadium has been increased to 4 558 individual seats.

== See also ==
- Stadiums in Georgia
