= Lanchkhuti =

Lanchkhuti ლანჩხუთი
- City
- View of Lanchkhuti from a nearby village

- Location in Georgia Lanchkhuti ლანჩხუთი (Georgia)
- Coordinates: 42°5′15″N 42°2′10″E
- Country: (Georgia (country)) Georgia
- Region: Guria
- District: Lanchkhuti
- Elevation: 25 m (82 ft)

Population (2024)
  - Total: 6,213
- Time zone: UTC+4 (Georgian Time)

Lanchkhuti (Georgian: ლანჩხუთი) is a city in the Georgian region of Guria. It has a population of about 6,395.

Lanchkhuti received city status in 1961. Under the USSR, it was the centre of the Georgian SSR Lanchkhuti area and today continues to serve as the capital of the eponymous district within the Guria region.

Lanchkhuti is an industrial town with a tea processing factory, cannery, meat and dairy factory and a brick and tile factory. The town is served by a railway station on the Samtredia-Batumi line.

== Geography ==
The city of Lanchkhuti is located in the Odishi-Guria plain, 25 m above sea level. It is located 274 km from the capital of Tbilisi, 85 km from Batumi, and 42 km from Poti. The S12 highway passes through the city. The city has a humid subtropical maritime climate, with warm winters and hot summers.

== Twin towns — Sister cities ==
Lanchkhuti is twinned with the following cities:

- Cody, Wyoming, United States
- Kupiškis District Municipality, Lithuania

== Notable people ==
- Davit Kvirkvelia (b. 1980), Georgian football manager and former player
- Joni Pirtskhalaishvili (b. 1947), retired Soviet Georgian general
- Noe Zhordania (1868 – 1953), Georgian revolutionary and politicians

== Gallery ==
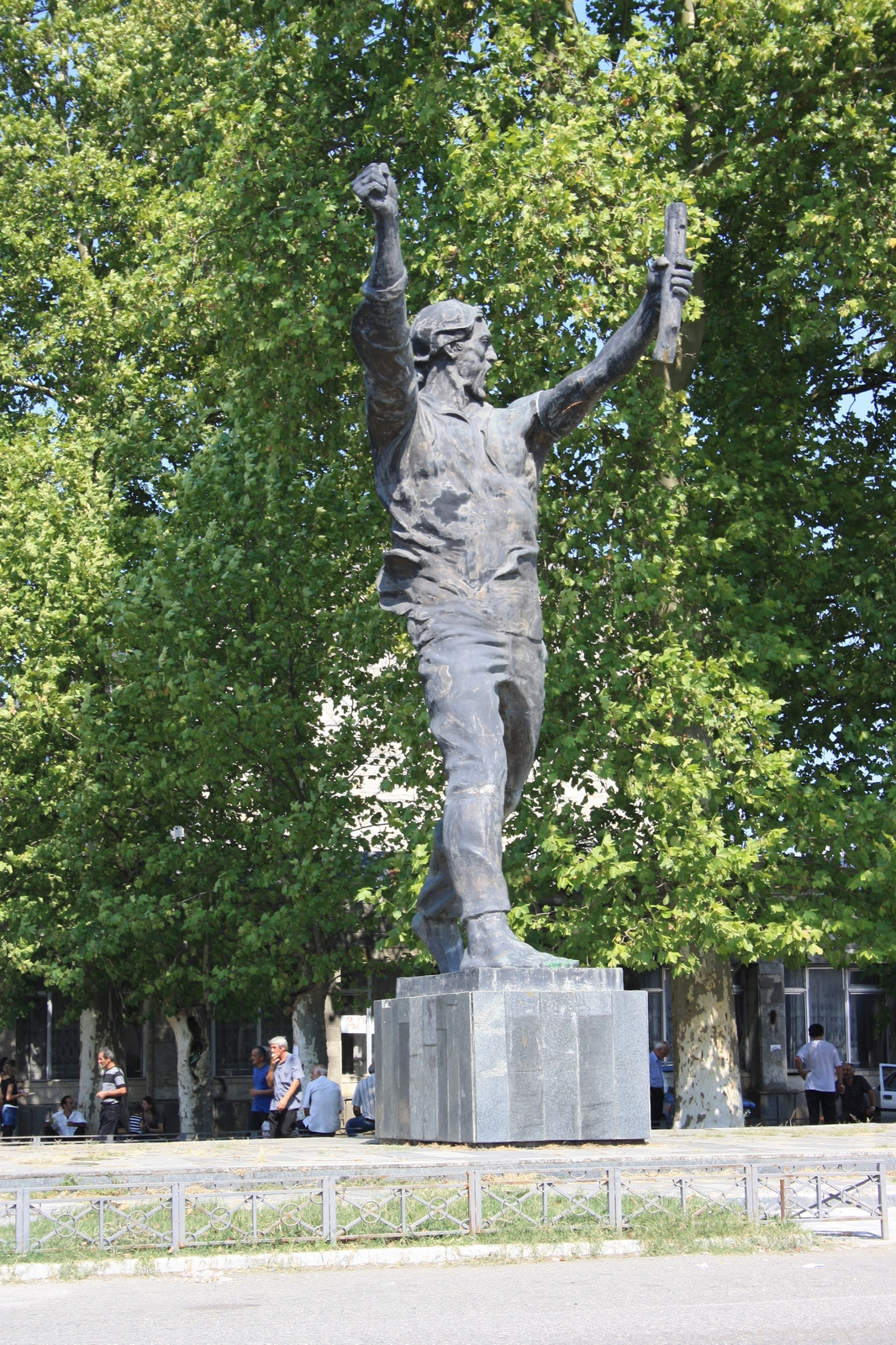
Monument to the "Rebellious Guru" in Lanchkhuti Center

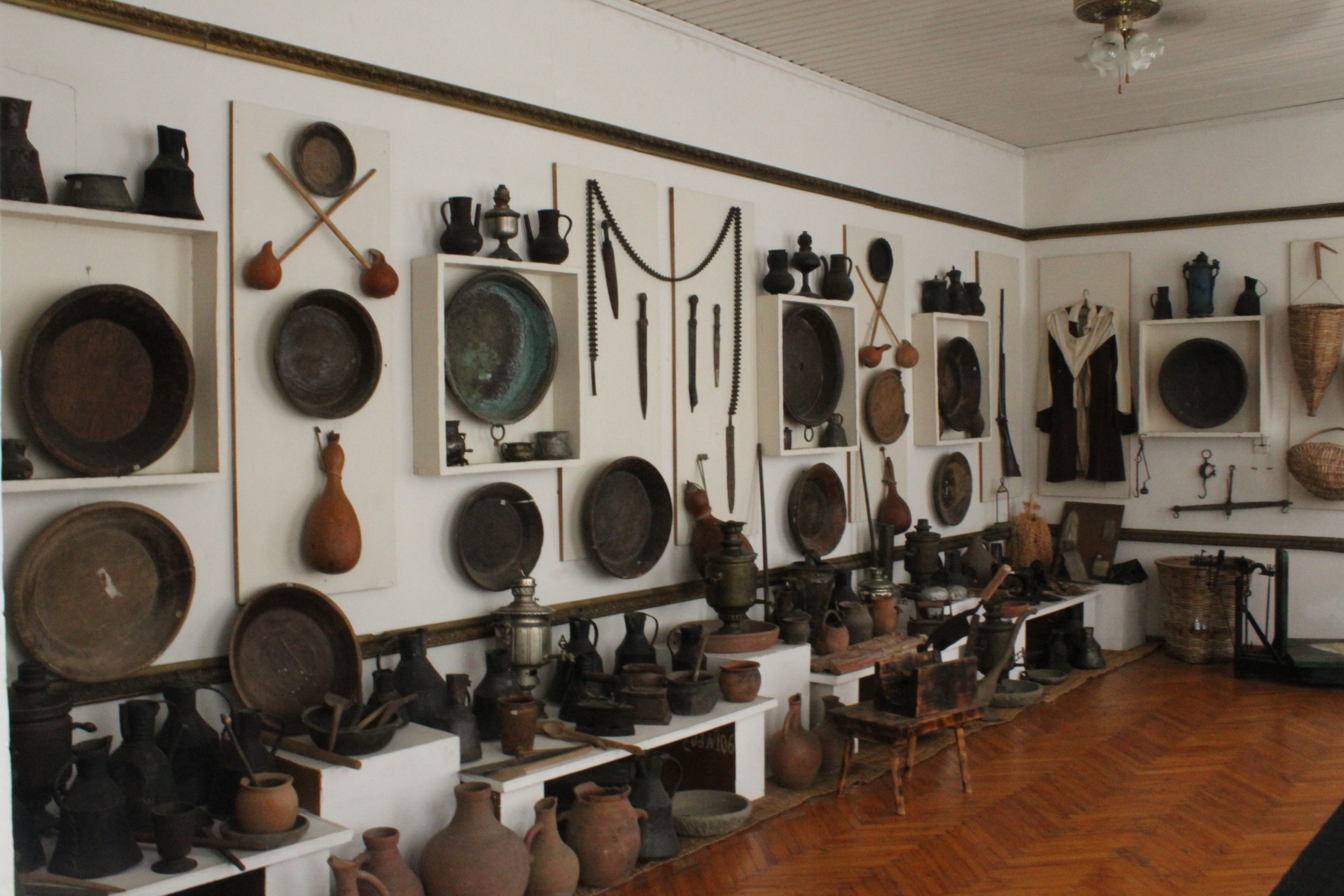
View of the Lanchkhuti Museum

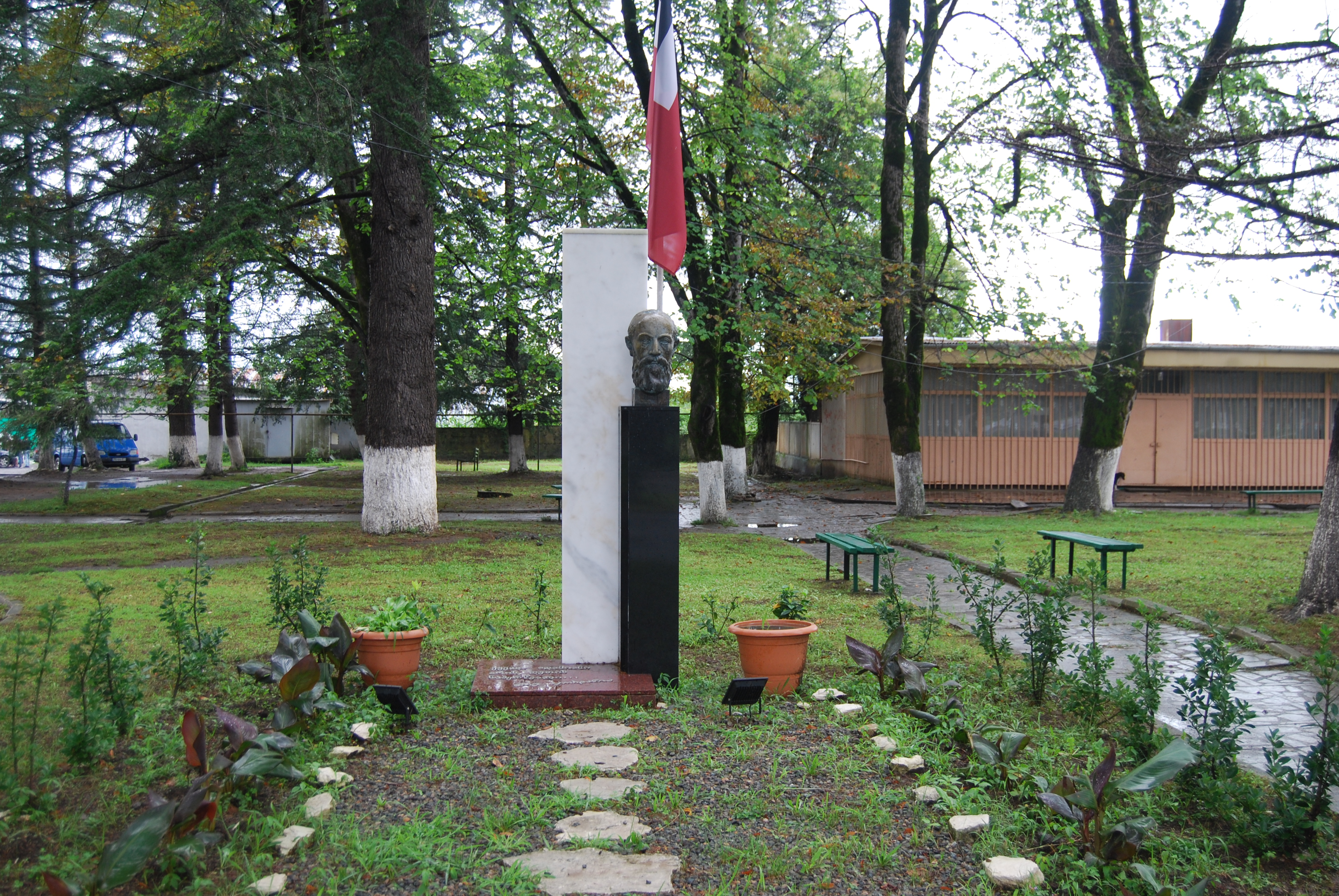
Noe Zhordania Statue and square in Lanchkhuti

== Culture ==
In 1978, the Lanchkhuti Museum of Local Lore was founded. The museum houses several thousand artifacts across different exhibits.

=== Sports ===
The local football club is FC Guria Lanchkhuti, who play their home games at the Evgrapi Shevardnadze Stadium. They played one season in the Soviet Top League and won the 1990 Georgian Cup.

== See also ==
- Guria
