= Tengiz Burjanadze Stadium =

Stadium in Gori, Georgia

Coordinates: 41°58′59″N 44°06′14″E

Tengiz Burjanadze Stadium თენგიზ ბურჯანაძის სტადიონი
- Dila Stadium (დილას სტადიონი)
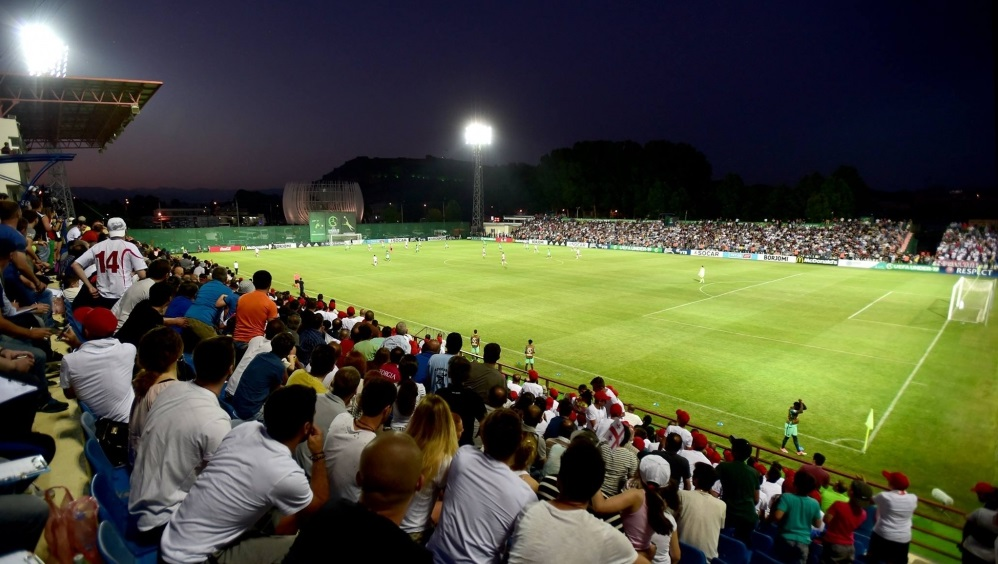
- UEFA Category 2 Stadium
- Interactive map of Tengiz Burjanadze Stadium თენგიზ ბურჯანაძის სტადიონი
- Location: (Georgia (country)) Gori, Georgia
- Owner: Government of Georgia
- Capacity: 5,000
- Surface: Grass
- Scoreboard: Yes
- Field size: 105 m × 68 m (344 ft × 223 ft)

Tenants
- FC Dila Gori; Georgia national football team

Tengiz Burjanadze Stadium is a multi-use stadium in Gori, Georgia. It is used mostly for football matches and is the home stadium of FC Dila Gori. The stadium is able to hold 5,000 people.

Being a UEFA category 2 arena, it is named after football player Tengiz Burjanadze, who had several distinguished seasons at Dila in the late 1960s.

Prior to 2017 UEFA European Under-19 Championship, the stadium underwent a thorough renovation which cost around 1,350,000 GEL. After individual chairs were installed, its initial capacity has been reduced from 8,500.

The arena is often used by Georgian youth teams. In 2017, U19s held there their all three European championship matches.

== Gallery ==
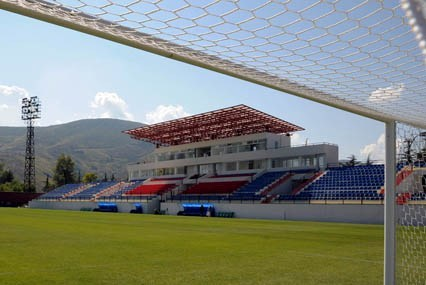
West Stand

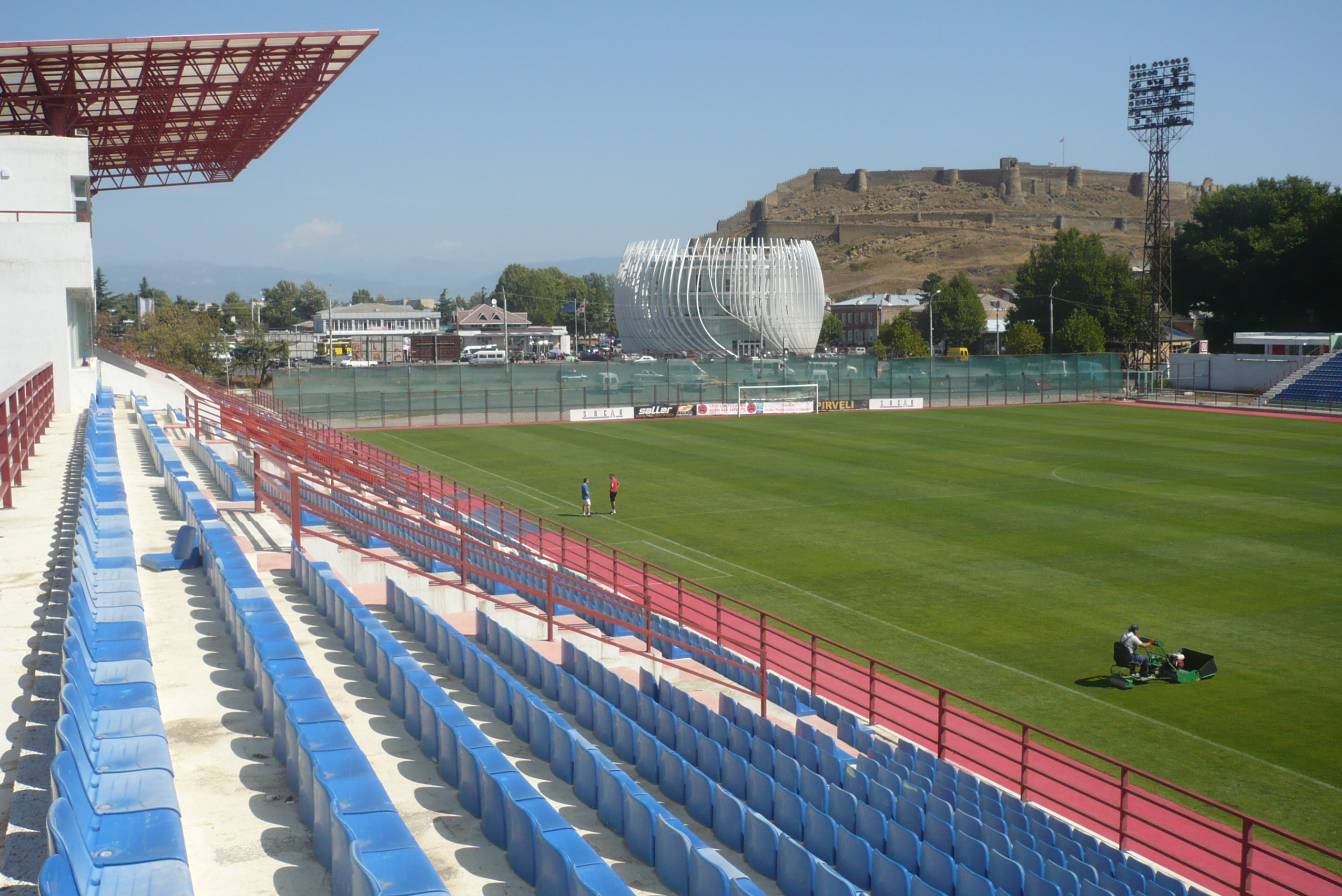
West Stand

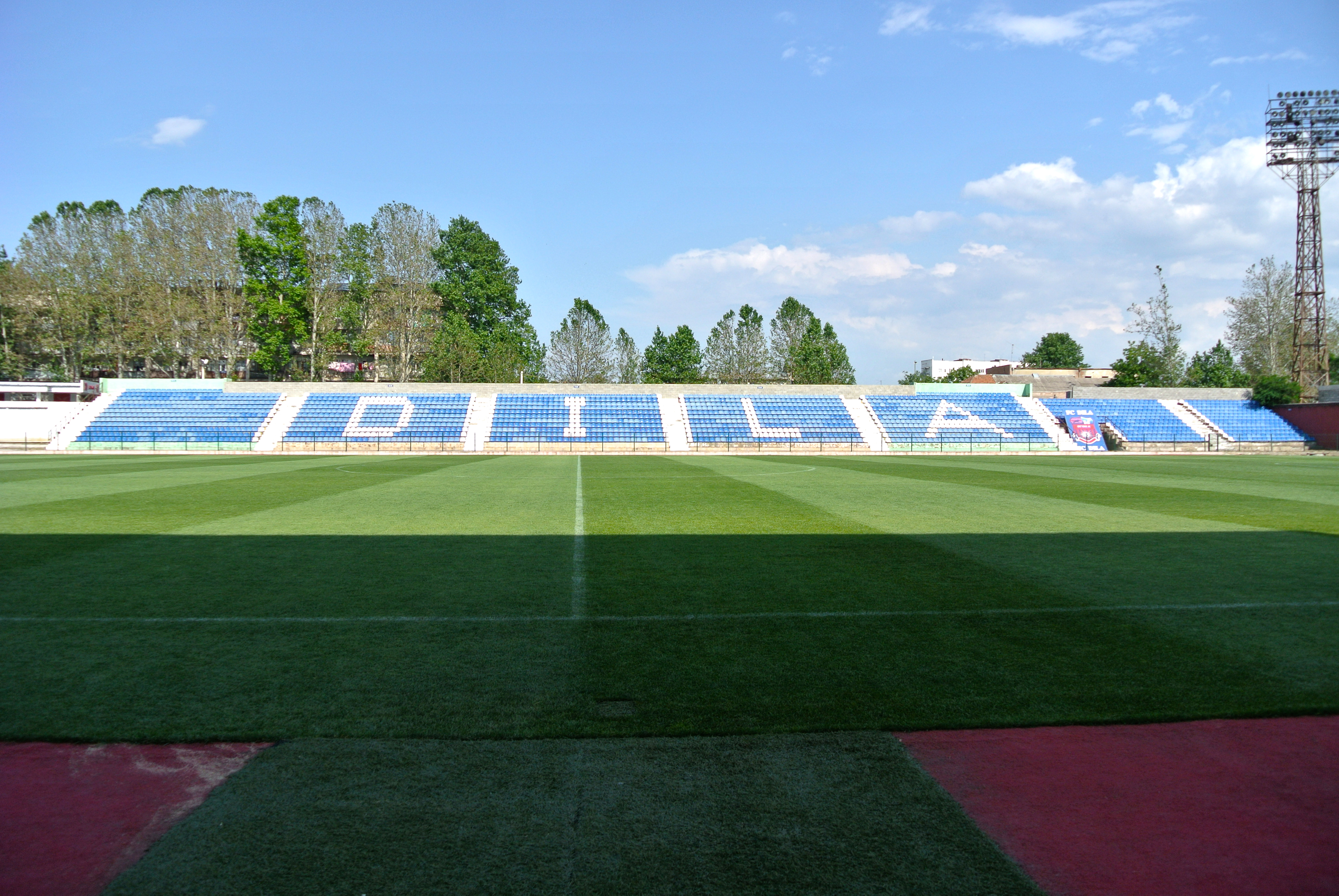
East Stand

== See also ==
- Stadiums in Georgia
