= Mtskheta Park =

Multi-use stadium in Mtskheta, Georgia

Coordinates: 41°50′50.23″N 44°43′17.37″E

Mtskheta Park მცხეთა პარკი
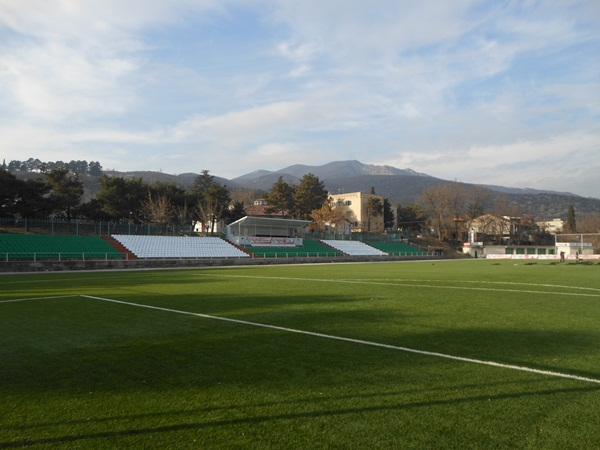
- Interactive map of Mtskheta Park მცხეთა პარკი
- Location: (Georgia (country)) Mtskheta, Georgia
- Owner: WIT GEORGIA
- Capacity: 2,000
- Surface: Grass
- Scoreboard: Yes
- Field size: 105 m × 68 m (344 ft × 223 ft)

Tenants
- FC WIT Georgia; 2017 UEFA European Under-19 Championship

Mtskheta Park is a multi-use stadium in Mtskheta, Georgia. It is used mostly for football matches and is the home stadium of FC WIT Georgia.

== See also ==
- Stadiums in Georgia
