= Ramaz Shengelia Stadium =

Stadium in Kutaisi, Georgia

Coordinates: 42.2551413°N 42.6830864°E

Ramaz Shengelia Stadium რამაზ შენგელიას სტადიონი
- Torpedo Stadium
- Interactive map of Ramaz Shengelia Stadium რამაზ შენგელიას სტადიონი
- Location: Kutaisi, Georgia
- Owner: Government of Georgia
- Capacity: 10 400
- Surface: Grass
- Scoreboard: Yes
- Field size: 105 m × 70 m (344 ft × 230 ft)

Construction
- Built: 1950
- Renovated: 2023

Tenant
- FC Torpedo Kutaisi

Ramaz Shengelia Stadium (Georgian: რამაზ შენგელიას სტადიონი) is a multi-use stadium in Kutaisi, Georgia used mostly for football matches. Being the home stadium of FC Torpedo Kutaisi, it was built in 1950 and further expanded in 1962. In 2010, when Torpedo returned to Umaglesi Liga, the arena underwent redevelopments. The stadium is able to hold 12,000 people.

It was initially named after Givi Kiladze, however in 2016 it was renamed after Ramaz Shengelia, a former Soviet / Georgian football player who was born in Kutaisi and started his career at Torpedo.

The Stadium was extensively rebuilt in 2023, prior to being a venue for the UEFA Under 21 European Championship. According to government officials, it cost 35 million GEL, equal to 12,250,000 €. Shengelia Stadium hosted 3 Group Stage matches, and a quarter-final match. Previously, the Georgia national team held a friendly match against Belarus here. The venue has also been used for the national cup final and the Super Cup final.

== See also ==
- Stadiums in Georgia
