= Boris Paichadze Dinamo Arena =

Stadium in Tbilisi, Georgia

Boris Paitchadze Dinamo Arena
- Dinamo Arena
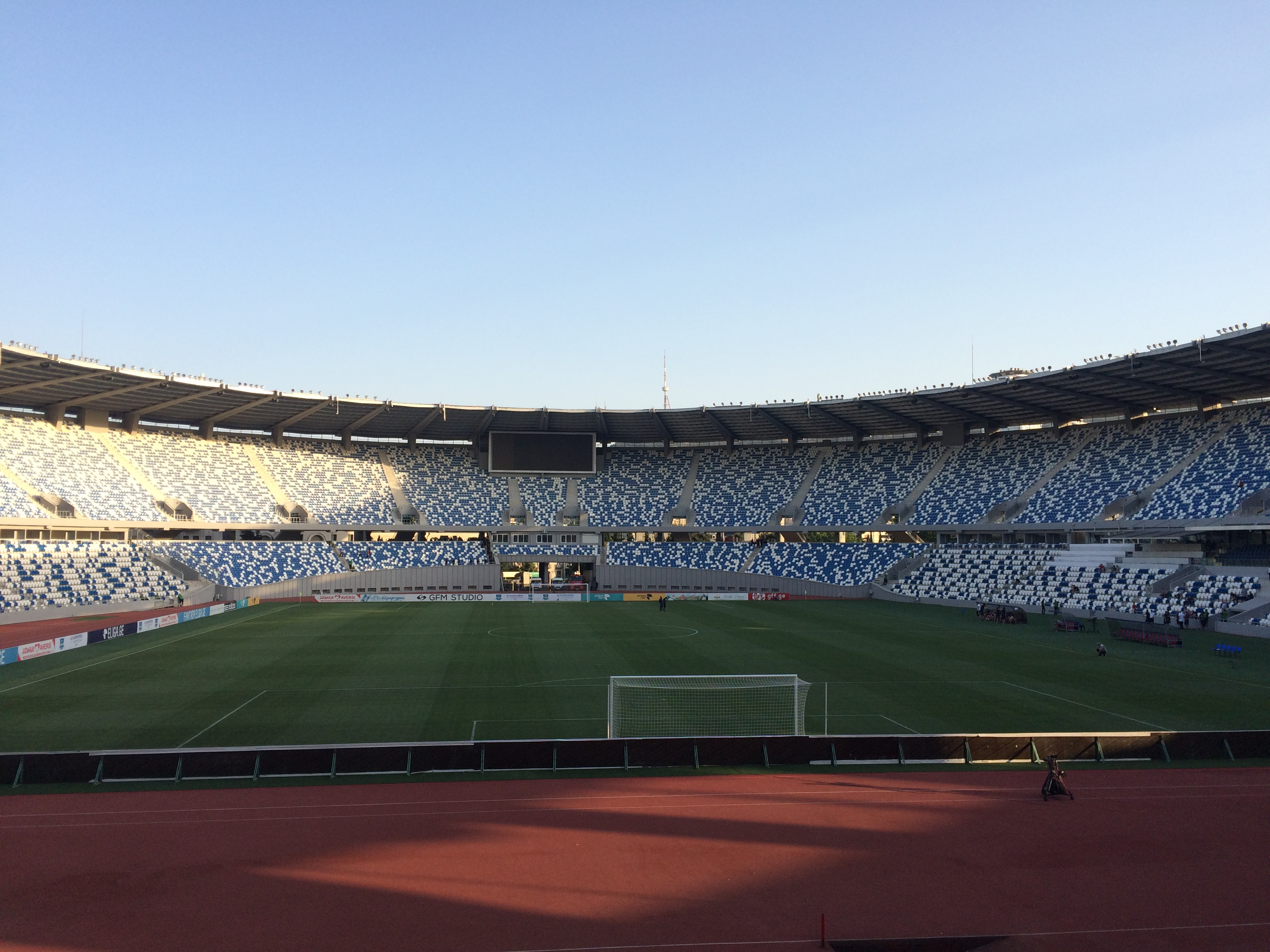
- UEFA Category 4 Stadium
- Interactive map of Boris Paitchadze Dinamo Arena
- Former names: Lenin Dinamo Stadium (1976–1990); Boris Paitchadze National Stadium (1995–2011)
- Location: Tbilisi, Georgia
- Coordinates: 41°43′23″N 44°47′23″E
- Owner: Dinamo Tbilisi
- Capacity: 54,139
- Executive suites: 52
- Surface: Natural Grass
- Scoreboard: Yes
- Record attendance: 110,000 (Dinamo Tbilisi - Liverpool 3-0, 3 October 1979, Georgia-Germany 0-2, 29 March 1995)
- Field size: 105 m × 68 m (344 ft × 223 ft)

Construction
- Built: 1976
- Renovated: 2006
- Architects: Archil Kurdiani, Gia Kurdiani
- Structural engineer: Shalva Gazashvili

Tenants
- FC Dinamo Tbilisi (1976–present); Georgia national football team (1990–present); Georgia national rugby union team (selected matches)

Website
- www.fcdinamo.ge/en/club/stadium

The Boris Paitchadze Dinamo Arena (Georgian: ბორის პაიჭაძის სახელობის დინამო არენა Boris P’aich’adzis dinamo arena), formerly known as Boris Paitchadze National Stadium, is a stadium in Tbilisi, Georgia, and the home stadium of Dinamo Tbilisi, Georgia national rugby union team and Georgia national football team. With a capacity of 54,139, the stadium is the largest in Georgia. Built in 1976 by the Georgian architect Gia Kurdiani, the Dinamo Arena was named Vladimir Ilyich Lenin Dinamo Stadium after Russian Communist leader but later, in 1995 was renamed Boris Paitchadze National Stadium after the famous Georgian football player Boris Paichadze (1915–1990). Prior to the construction of Boris Paitchadze Dinamo Arena, the home stadium of Dinamo Tbilisi was the Central Stadium with an approximate capacity of 35,000 spectators. The demand for a much bigger stadium was increased with the successful performance of Dinamo Tbilisi in the mid 1970s. After the inauguration of the stadium, it became the third-largest in the Soviet Union, with a capacity of 74,354 spectators.

== Background ==
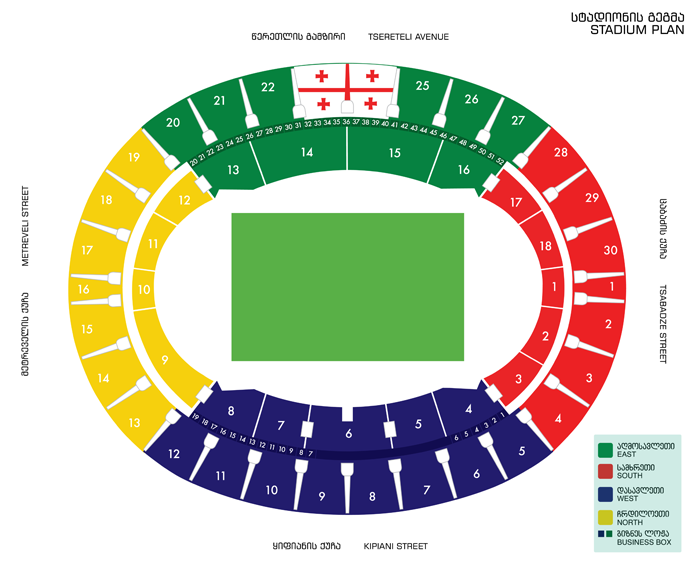
Stadium blueprint

On 29 September 1976, the first official match was played at the newly built stadium between Dinamo Tbilisi and Welsh Cardiff City. The game ended with a 3–0 victory for Dinamo.

The stadium hosted many matches during Dinamo's 1978 and 1979 triumphs. Holding lighted torches, 80,000 fans came in 1981 to congratulate the 1980–81 European Cup Winners' Cup winning team Dinamo Tbilisi.

The Dinamo Arena is now one of the largest stadiums in Eastern Europe. Most of the seats in the second tier are covered by the roof. The USSR national football team played several international matches on the Dinamo Arena. Football clubs Spartak Moscow, Dynamo Kiev and Dynamo Moscow often played their autumn international matches at the stadium.

100,000 fans attended the opening game of the First Georgian Championship, match between FC Dinamo Tbilisi and FC Kolkheti-1913 Poti. The record attendance was in 1979, when 110,000 gathered to help Dinamo beat Liverpool F.C. 3:0 to go through to the European Champion Clubs' Cup quarter final, and in 1995, Georgia-Germany 0-2, UEFA EURO 1996 qualifaying match. In the Soviet Union, the stadium had the record for the highest average attendance (around 65,000 per game).

In 1995, the stadium was renamed Boris Paichadze National Stadium, after the former Georgian football player. The National Stadium has been the home ground of the Georgian National Football Team for several years. Georgia achieved memorable wins against Wales (5-0), and Poland (3-0).

The stadium was refurbished in 2006 and became an all-seater stadium. This reduced the capacity to 54,549.

On 11 August 2015, the stadium hosted UEFA Super Cup match between FC Barcelona and Sevilla FC.

== History ==
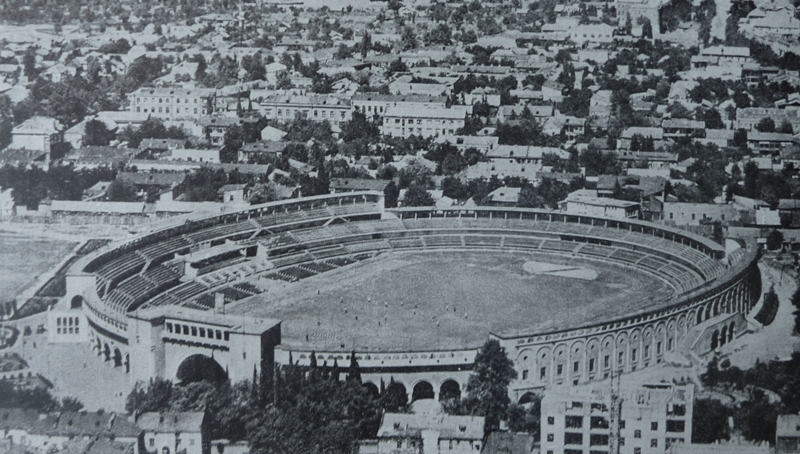
Dinamo Stadium in 1935

The newly built "Dinamo" stadium, housing 23,000 spectators, was inaugurated in Tbilisi in 1936. The author of the project design was architect Archil Kurdiani (the elder).

It was under his leadership that in 1956 the stadium has been subject to reconstruction with the edition of steel structures, which has made it possible to increase its occupancy up to 36.000 spectators.

The reconstructed Dinamo Arena stadium was inaugurated on 26 September 1976. Architects Archil Kurdiani (the elder) and Gia Kurdiani, along with the construction designer Shalva Gazashvili extended the capacity of the stadium to 74,354.

Fragments of the 1936 Stadium were partly maintained, and yet quite complex architectural-designing construction elements were realized. The facility represented a console system supported by 58 pylons. Each of these pylons been supported by 24 poles, where the depth of each ranged from 8 to 12 meters. The console system comprised several elements. The evacuation terrace was arranging spectators ascending by 23 stairs between the II and I tiers. The II tier, like the evacuation terrace, represented an element of indivisible console system.

The solution for Roofing of II tier was also of the console design. 30 meter console-design roofing protects spectators against precipitations.

The Author’s approach for calculating and designing the Visual angle for II tier was original thus ensuring full visibility of the stadium for any spectator from any seat. The roof was also used as a cite for placement of lightning and insonification. The stadium was equipped by two electronic boards. At the level of evacuation terrace were arranged government boxes and commentary studios. The area below evacuation terrace and Ist tier tribunes housed floor sporting facilities, swimming pool, administrative unit and other administrative facilities arranged at floors from 1 to 2. The Stadium, along its entire perimeter was encircled by 2 communication tunnels. One at the ground level, while the other between the ground level and evacuation terrace. The stadium was fenced.

The former swimming pool of the stadium now houses the nightclub Bassiani.

== See also ==
- Mikheil Meskhi Stadium
- List of football stadiums in Georgia
- List of rugby union stadiums by capacity
- Lists of stadiums

Preceded by Cardiff City Stadium; Cardiff	UEFA Super Cup; Match venue 2015	Succeeded by Lerkendal Stadion; Trondheim
