= Poladi Stadium =

Stadium in Rustavi, Georgia

Coordinates: 41°32′27.60″N 45°00′25.00″E

Poladi Stadium ფოლადის სტადიონი
- Metalurgi Stadium
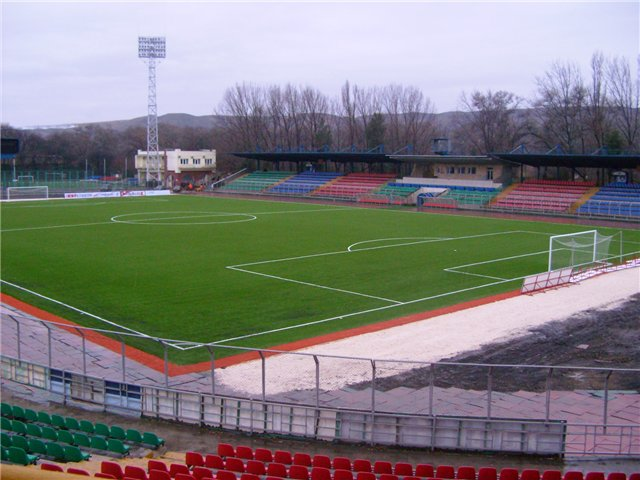
- Interactive map of Poladi Stadium ფოლადის სტადიონი
- Location: (Georgia (country)) Rustavi, Georgia
- Owner: Government of Georgia
- Capacity: 4,657
- Surface: Artificial turf
- Scoreboard: No
- Field size: 105 m × 70 m (344 ft × 230 ft)

Tenants
- FC Rustavi; 2017 UEFA European Under-19 Championship

The Poladi stadium is a multi-use stadium in Rustavi, Georgia. Used mostly for football matches, the arena belonged to the local municipality before it was handed over to the Rustavi metallurgical plant. Therefore, the stadium built in 1948 was the home ground of Metalurgi Rustavi for many years. After the latter dissolved in 2015, FC Rustavi became its tenants, although due to a dispute with the plant administration, at some point they had to move out of the stadium.

In early 2018, the Football Federation revealed that talks were ongoing about a possible return of the stadium to the city municipality. The transfer of ownership was announced in October 2018. Since 2023, Liga 3 side FC Rustavi as well as their junior team participating in the regional league have been using the stadium for home matches.

The stadium is able to hold 4,657 people. Original capacity before installing individual seats was 10,720. Twice, in 1985 and 2009, the arena underwent a partial reconstruction.

== See also ==
- Stadiums in Georgia
