= 2003–04 Georgian Cup =

Tournament details
- Country: Georgia
- Teams: 46

Final positions
- Champions: Dinamo Tbilisi
- Runners-up: Torpedo Kutaisi

The 2003–04 Georgian Cup (also known as the David Kipiani Cup) was the sixtieth season overall and fourteenth since independence of the Georgian annual football tournament. The competition began on 27 February 2004 and ended with the Final held on 26 May 2004. The defending champions are Dinamo Tbilisi.

== Round of 32 ==
The first legs were played on 27 and 28 February and the second legs were played on 1 and 2 March 2004.

Team 1	Agg.	Team 2	1st leg	2nd leg
Dinamo Batumi	8–1	Dinamo Zugdidi	3–0	5–1
Mtskheta-Urioni	2–0	SK Tbilisi	1–0	1–0
Dila Gori	6–0	Avaza Tbilisi	1–0	5–0
Tskhinvali	2–2 (a)	Hereti Chabukiani	2–1	0–1
Mertskhali Ozurgeti	1–0	Metalurgi Zestaponi	0–0	1–0
Kobuleti	7–0	Lokomotivi Samtredia	5–0	2–0
Torpedo Kutaisi	7–1	Guria Lanchkhuti	5–0	2–1
Sioni Bolnisi	4–1	Iveria Khashuri	2–0	2–1
Dinamo Tbilisi	6–1	WIT Georgia Mtskheta	3–0	3–1
Samgurali Tskaltubo	1–0	Luka Batumi	0–0	1–0
Locomotive Tbilisi	7–3	Gorda-2000 Rustavi	3–3	4–0
FC Tbilisi	4–1	Milani Tsnori	2–0	2–1
Ameri Tbilisi	7–0	Urioni Tbilisi	2–0	5–0
Spartaki Tbilisi	2–0	Prema Tbilisi	1–0	1–0
Kolkheti-1913 Poti	7–2	Dinamo Kutaisi	4–0	3–2
WIT Georgia	4–0	Chikhura Sachkhere	1–0	3–0

== Round of 16 ==
The first legs were played on 6, 7 and 10 March and the second legs were played on 12, 13 and 14 March 2004.

Team 1	Agg.	Team 2	1st leg	2nd leg
Dinamo Tbilisi	7–3	Samgurali Tskaltubo	6–0	1–3
Dila Gori	4–1	Hereti Chabukiani	3–0	1–1
Locomotive Tbilisi	1–1 (3–4 p)	FC Tbilisi	1–0	0–1 (a.e.t.)
Kolkheti-1913 Poti	0–6	WIT Georgia	0–3	0–3
Ameri Tbilisi	0–2	Spartaki Tbilisi	0–0	0–2
Dinamo Batumi	1–0	Mtskheta-Urioni	1–0	0–0
Mertskhali Ozurgeti	2–2 (a)	Kobuleti	2–1	0–1
Torpedo Kutaisi	3–2	Sioni Bolnisi	0–0	3–2

== Quarterfinals ==
The matches were played on 22 March (first legs) and 6 April 2004 (second legs).

Team 1	Agg.	Team 2	1st leg	2nd leg
Dinamo Tbilisi	6–1	Dinamo Batumi	2–0	4–1
Spartaki Tbilisi	2–1	WIT Georgia	1–0	1–1
Kobuleti	1–10	Torpedo Kutaisi	0–5	1–5
Dila Gori	1–1 (a)	FC Tbilisi	0–0	1–1

== Semifinals ==
The matches were played on 20 April (first legs) and 5 May 2004 (second legs).

Team 1	Agg.	Team 2	1st leg	2nd leg
Dinamo Tbilisi	2–0	Dila Gori	1–0	1–0
Torpedo Kutaisi	2–0	Spartaki Tbilisi	2–0	0–0

== Final ==
26 May 2004

Dinamo Tbilisi	2–1	Torpedo Kutaisi
Kashia 61'; Silagadze 63'		Davitashvili 2'

Mikheil Meskhi Stadium, Tbilisi
Attendance: 15,000
Referee: Sergo Kvaratskhelia (Zugdidi)

== See also ==
- 2003–04 Umaglesi Liga
- 2003–04 Pirveli Liga
