= 2001–02 Umaglesi Liga =

Umaglesi Liga
- Season: 2001–02
- Dates: 28 July 2001 – 22 May 2002
- Champions: Torpedo Kutaisi; 3rd Georgian title
- Relegated: Samgurali Tskaltubo; Guria Lanchkhuti
- Champions League: Torpedo Kutaisi
- UEFA Cup: Dinamo Tbilisi; Locomotive Tbilisi
- Intertoto Cup: WIT Georgia
- Matches played: 192
- Goals scored: 469 (2.44 per match)
- Top goalscorer: Suliko Davitashvili (18)
- Biggest home win: Dinamo Tbilisi 10–0 Merani
- Biggest away win: Sioni 0–5 Locomotive
- Highest scoring: Dinamo Tbilisi 10–0 Merani

The 2001–02 Umaglesi Liga was the thirteenth season of top-tier football in Georgia. It began on 28 July 2001 and ended on 22 May 2002. Torpedo Kutaisi were the defending champions.

== Locations ==
Location of teams in 2001–02 Umaglesi Liga

== First stage ==
=== League table ===
Pos	Team	Pld	W	D	L	GF	GA	GD	Pts	Qualification
1	Torpedo Kutaisi	22	16	4	2	52	13	+39	52	Qualification to Championship group
2	Locomotive Tbilisi	22	15	4	3	38	12	+26	49	Qualification to Championship group
3	Dinamo Tbilisi	22	11	5	6	37	19	+18	38	Qualification to Championship group
4	Dinamo Batumi	22	11	4	7	31	19	+12	37	Qualification to Championship group
5	Kolkheti-1913 Poti	22	10	5	7	32	29	+3	35	Qualification to Championship group
6	Merani-91 Tbilisi	22	10	4	8	34	28	+6	34	Qualification to Championship group
7	WIT Georgia	22	9	6	7	33	29	+4	33	Qualification to Relegation group
8	Sioni Bolnisi	22	7	4	11	17	30	−13	25	Qualification to Relegation group
9	Metalurgi Zestaponi	22	4	8	10	17	34	−17	20	Qualification to Relegation group
10	Guria Lanchkhuti	22	3	6	13	14	44	−30	15	Qualification to Relegation group
11	Gorda Rustavi	22	3	5	14	16	37	−21	14	Qualification to Relegation group
12	Samgurali Tskaltubo	22	3	5	14	15	42	−27	14	Qualification to Relegation group

Source: rsssf.org
Rules for classification: 1st points; 2nd matches won; 3rd head-to-head

=== Results ===
Home \ Away	DBA	DIN	GOR	GUR	KOL	LOC	MER	MZE	SMG	SIO	TKU	WIT
Dinamo Batumi		2–0	1–0	4–0	4–1	1–3	1–0	3–1	1–0	1–0	1–0	3–0
Dinamo Tbilisi	2–1		1–1	1–1	2–0	0–0	6–0	6–1	3–0	2–0	0–2	2–5
Gorda Rustavi	1–1	0–1		1–2	1–2	0–2	0–3	0–0	3–0	1–0	0–3	3–2
Guria Lanchkhuti	0–0	0–2	2–1		1–0	0–1	1–1	0–3	1–1	0–0	0–2	1–5
Kolkheti-1913 Poti	1–0	0–4	4–1	2–1		2–1	1–1	1–1	6–0	2–1	3–2	3–0
Locomotive Tbilisi	3–2	2–1	1–0	2–0	2–0		3–0	3–0	1–0	1–2	1–1	3–1
Merani-91 Tbilisi	1–0	1–0	3–0	4–2	1–2	0–1		1–1	4–0	3–0	1–1	2–1
Metalurgi Zestaponi	1–1	0–1	2–1	0–0	0–0	0–3	0–1		3–1	4–0	0–3	0–3
Samgurali Tskaltubo	2–3	1–2	2–0	3–1	0–0	0–0	1–0	0–0		1–1	1–4	1–2
Sioni Bolnisi	1–0	0–0	1–1	3–0	2–1	0–5	2–1	2–0	2–0		0–1	0–1
Torpedo Kutaisi	2–1	1–1	3–0	3–1	3–0	2–0	4–2	4–0	3–0	4–0		1–1
WIT Georgia	0–0	1–0	1–1	5–0	1–1	0–0	1–4	0–0	2–1	1–0	0–3	

Source: rsssf.org
Legend: Blue = home team win; Yellow = draw; Red = away team win.

== Second stage ==
=== Championship group ===
==== Table ====
Pos	Team	Pld	W	D	L	GF	GA	GD	Pts	Qualification
1	Torpedo Kutaisi (C)	10	7	1	2	12	5	+7	48	Qualification for the Champions League first qualifying round
2	Locomotive Tbilisi	10	7	1	2	18	6	+12	47	Qualification for the UEFA Cup qualifying round
3	Dinamo Tbilisi	10	8	1	1	20	1	+19	44	Qualification for the UEFA Cup qualifying round
4	Kolkheti-1913 Poti	10	2	2	6	9	16	−7	26	
5	Dinamo Batumi	10	1	1	8	5	19	−14	23	
6	Merani-91 Tbilisi	10	2	0	8	7	24	−17	23	

Source: rsssf.org
Rules for classification: 1st points; 2nd matches won; 3rd head-to-head
(C) Champions

==== Results ====
Home \ Away	DIN	DBA	KOL	MER	LOC	TKU
Dinamo Tbilisi		3–0	1–0	10–0	2–0	1–0
Dinamo Batumi	0–1		1–1	1–2	0–1	0–1
Kolkheti-1913 Poti	0–1	3–0		1–0	1–3	0–0
Merani-91 Tbilisi	0–1	0–1	4–1		0–1	1–2
Locomotive Tbilisi	0–0	5–1	4–1	3–0		0–1
Torpedo Kutaisi	1–0	2–1	2–1	3–0	0–1	

Source: rsssf.org
Legend: Blue = home team win; Yellow = draw; Red = away team win.

=== Relegation group ===
==== Table ====
Pos	Team	Pld	W	D	L	GF	GA	GD	Pts	Qualification or relegation
7	WIT Georgia	10	5	3	2	12	8	+4	35	Qualification for the Intertoto Cup first round
8	Sioni Bolnisi	10	5	1	4	18	13	+5	29	
9	Metalurgi Zestaponi	10	5	2	3	16	10	+6	27	
10	Gorda Rustavi (O)	10	5	3	2	20	11	+9	25	Qualification to Relegation play-offs
11	Samgurali Tskaltubo (R)	10	5	1	4	11	10	+1	23	Relegation to Pirveli Liga
12	Guria Lanchkhuti (R)	10	0	0	10	4	29	−25	8	Relegation to Pirveli Liga

Source: rsssf.org
Rules for classification: 1st points; 2nd matches won; 3rd head-to-head
(O) Play-off winners; (R) Relegated

==== Results ====
Home \ Away	GOR	GUR	MZE	SMG	SIO	WIT
Gorda Rustavi		5–0	1–0	1–0	3–0	2–2
Guria Lanchkhuti	1–5		0–3	1–2	1–3	0–1
Metalurgi Zestaponi	0–0	4–1		3–0	3–1	2–0
Samgurali Tskaltubo	0–0	3–0	2–1		1–0	2–1
Sioni Bolnisi	4–2	2–0	5–0	2–1		0–0
WIT Georgia	4–1	1–0	0–0	1–0	2–1	

Source: rsssf.org
Legend: Blue = home team win; Yellow = draw; Red = away team win.

== Relegation play-offs ==
29 May 2002

Gorda-2000 Rustavi	2 – 1	FC Kobuleti

Tbilisi

== Top goalscorers ==
Rank	Goalscorer	Team	Goals
1	(Georgia (country)) Suliko Davitashvili	Locomotive Tbilisi / Merani-91 Tbilisi	18
2	(Ukraine) Andriy Poroshyn	Torpedo Kutaisi	17
3	(Georgia (country)) Zviad Endeladze	Metalurgi Zestaponi / Guria Lanchkhuti	14
4	(Georgia (country)) Mikheil Bobokhidze	Dinamo Tbilisi	13
5	(Georgia (country)) Lado Burduli	Dinamo Tbilisi	12
5	(Georgia (country)) Shalva Isiani	Sioni Bolnisi	12
5	(Georgia (country)) Hamlet Tsivtsivadze	Kolkheti-1913 Poti	12
8	(Georgia (country)) Shalva Apkhazava	Dinamo Batumi	11
8	(Georgia (country)) Zviad Kutateladze	Torpedo Kutaisi	11
10	(Georgia (country)) David Datvadze	Locomotive Tbilisi	10
10	(Georgia (country)) Paata Machutadze	Dinamo Batumi	10

== See also ==
- 2001–02 Pirveli Liga
- 2001–02 Georgian Cup
