= 2004–05 Georgian Cup =

Tournament details
- Country: Georgia
- Teams: 28

Final positions
- Champions: Locomotive Tbilisi
- Runners-up: Zestaponi

The 2004–05 Georgian Cup (also known as the David Kipiani Cup) was the sixty-first season overall and fifteenth since independence of the Georgian annual football tournament. The competition began on 25 August 2004 and ended with the Final held on 26 May 2005. The defending champions are Dinamo Tbilisi.

== Round of 32 ==
The first legs were played on 25 August and the second legs were played on 3 September 2004.

Team 1	Agg.	Team 2	1st leg	2nd leg
Torpedo Kutaisi	11–5	Guria Lanchkhuti	6–0	5–5
Kolkheti-1913 Poti	7–0	Egrisi Senaki	5–0	2–0
Dinamo Batumi	5–1	Kolkheti Khobi	4–0	1–1
Zestaponi	7–4	Magharoeli Chiatura	3–2	4–2
Chikhura Sachkhere	3–6	Ameri Tbilisi	1–2	2–4
Locomotive Tbilisi	3–0	Iveria Khashuri	3–0	0–0
Sioni Bolnisi	3–2	Borjomi	2–2	1–0
Rustavi	2–2 (a)	Chabukiani	2–1	0–1
Spart'aki Tbilisi	3–1	Tskhumi Sokhumi	3–1	0–0
Tskhinvali	3–1	Mukhrani	2–0	1–1
Milani-Merani Tbilisi	3–2	Kakheti Telavi	2–0	1–2
Prema Tbilisi	3–0	Sagarejo	1–0	2–0

== Round of 16 ==
In this round entered winners from the previous round as well as three teams that finished at the top four in last year's Umaglesi Liga: WIT Georgia, Dinamo Tbilisi, FC Tbilisi and Dila Gori. The first legs were played on 20 October and the second legs were played on 3 November 2004.

Team 1	Agg.	Team 2	1st leg	2nd leg
WIT Georgia	12–0	Chabukiani	6–0	6–0
Dinamo Batumi	5–0	Prema Tbilisi	1–0	4–0
Sioni Bolnisi	2–5	Ameri Tbilisi	2–3	0–2
Torpedo Kutaisi	4–2	Milani-Merani Tbilisi	4–0	0–2
Kolkheti-1913 Poti	6–0	Tskhinvali	4–0	2–0
FC Tbilisi	5–4	Dila Gori	2–0	3–4
Spart'aki Tbilisi	2–8	Locomotive Tbilisi	1–2	1–6
Dinamo Tbilisi	2–2 (a)	Zestaponi	2–1	0–1

== Quarterfinals ==
The matches were played on 1 December (first legs) and 9 December 2004 (second legs).

Team 1	Agg.	Team 2	1st leg	2nd leg
FC Tbilisi	3–2	Torpedo Kutaisi	2–0	1–2
Kolkheti-1913 Poti	0–2	Locomotive Tbilisi	0–0	0–2
WIT Georgia	7–2	Ameri Tbilisi	5–2	2–0
Dinamo Batumi	0–1	Zestaponi	0–0	0–1

== Semifinals ==
The matches were played on 6 April (first legs) and 4 May 2005 (second legs).

Team 1	Agg.	Team 2	1st leg	2nd leg
FC Tbilisi	1–2	Zestaponi	0–0	1–2
Locomotive Tbilisi	4–1	WIT Georgia	2–0	2–1

== Final ==
26 May 2005

Locomotive Tbilisi	2–0	Zestaponi
Bobokhidze 55'; Manchkhava 60'

Boris Paichadze Stadium, Tbilisi
Attendance: 20,000
Referee: Levan Paniashvili (Tbilisi)

== See also ==
- 2004–05 Umaglesi Liga
- 2004–05 Pirveli Liga
