= 2002–03 Pirveli Liga =

Pirveli Liga
- Season: 2002–03
- Dates: 4 September 2002 – 31 May 2003
- Champions: Lazika Zugdidi
- Promoted: Lazika Zugdidi; Mertskhali Ozurgeti; Mtskheta
- Relegated: Kolkheti Khobi; Alazani Gurjaani; Lokomotivi Samtredia
- Matches played: 240

2002–03 Pirveli Liga was the 14th season of the Georgian Pirveli Liga. The season began on 4 September 2002 and ended on 31 May 2003.

== Format ==
There were 16 teams in the league taking part in a two-round competition. The top two teams gained automatic promotion to Umaglesi Liga, the third-placed club entered in play-off contest against the top-tier side and the bottom three teams were relegated.

== League standings ==
Pos	Team	Pld	W	D	L	GF	GA	GD	Pts	Promotion, qualification or relegation
1	Lazika Zugdidi (P)	30	19	7	4	64	30	+34	64	Promotion to Umaglesi Liga
2	Mertskhali Ozurgeti (P)	30	19	7	4	62	29	+33	64	Promotion to Umaglesi Liga
3	Mtskheta (P)	30	17	7	6	50	23	+27	58	Qualification for Promotion play-offs
4	Samgurali Tskaltubo	30	15	8	7	42	26	+16	53	
5	Spartaki Tbilisi	30	15	4	11	49	31	+18	49	
6	Tskhinvali	30	14	6	10	37	26	+11	48	
7	Kobuleti	30	14	6	10	27	23	+4	48	
8	Dinamo Tbilisi II	30	13	6	11	37	29	+8	45	
9	Lokomotivi Tbilisi II	30	11	11	8	32	25	+7	44	
10	TSU Tbilisi	30	10	8	12	28	33	−5	38	
11	Iveria Khashuri	30	10	7	13	39	41	−2	37	
12	Guria Lanchkhuti	30	9	7	14	32	44	−12	34	
13	Tbilisi II	30	9	5	16	38	46	−8	32	
14	Kolkheti Khobi (R)	30	6	5	19	17	44	−27	23	Relegation to Meore Liga
15	Alazani Gurjaani (R)	30	5	6	19	30	77	−47	21	Relegation to Meore Liga
16	Lokomotivi Samtredia (R)	30	3	2	25	24	81	−57	11	Relegation to Meore Liga

Source: soccerway.com
Rules for classification: 1) Points; 2) Number of wins; 3) Head-to-head record
(P) Promoted; (R) Relegated

== See also ==
- 2002–03 Umaglesi Liga
- 2002–03 Georgian Cup
