= 2001–02 Pirveli Liga =

2001–02 Pirveli Liga was the 13th season of the Georgian Pirveli Liga.

== First round ==
=== Table ===
Pos	Team	Pld	W	D	L	GF	GA	GD	Pts	Qualification or relegation
1	Dila Gori	22	15	4	3	51	14	+37	49	Qualification for Championship group
2	Milani Tsnori	22	13	7	2	48	20	+28	46	Qualification for Championship group
3	TSU Tbilisi	22	14	3	5	40	14	+26	45	Qualification for Championship group
4	Kobuleti	22	12	5	5	27	17	+10	41	Qualification for Championship group
5	Lokomotivi B Tbilisi	22	11	6	5	41	23	+18	39	Qualification for Championship group
6	Tskhinvali	22	11	3	8	42	31	+11	36	Qualification for Championship group
7	Dinamo B Tbilisi	22	9	1	12	21	24	−3	28	Qualification for Relegation group
8	Lazika Zugdidi	22	7	4	11	28	40	−12	25	Qualification for Relegation group
9	Kolkheti Khobi	22	5	7	10	21	35	−14	22	Qualification for Relegation group
10	Lokomotivi Samtredia	22	5	4	13	20	39	−19	19	Qualification for Relegation group
11	Norchi Dinamo-Merani B	22	5	1	16	17	47	−30	16	Qualification for Relegation group
12	Tori Borjomi (R)	22	2	1	19	16	68	−52	7	Relegation to Meore Liga

Source: rsssf.org
Rules for classification: 1st points; 2nd wins; 3rd head-to-head
(R) Relegated

=== Results ===
Home \ Away	DIL	DIN2	KHO	KOB	LAZ	LOK	MER	MIL	SAM	TORI	TSK	TSU
Dila Gori		1–0	3–0	1–0	6–0	2–1	1–0	2–2	7–0	4–0	1–3	1–0
Dinamo B Tbilisi	0–4		1–0	0–0	1–2	3–0	0–1	0–1	3–0	3–0	2–1	0–2
Kolkheti Khobi	1–2	1–2		1–0	1–1	0–2	0–0	1–1	1–1	4–1	0–0	1–0
Kobuleti	2–2	1–0	1–0		3–1	0–0	3–0	1–0	3–1	3–0	2–0	0–0
Lazika Zugdidi	2–0	0–1	1–1	1–2		1–1	2–0	2–3	2–1	3–0	3–2	0–3
Lokomotivi B Tbilisi	1–2	2–0	1–1	4–0	3–2		2–0	1–2	0–0	4–0	3–0	3–3
Merani-91 B Tbilisi	0–4	0–1	1–2	0–1	1–2	1–6		1–5	3–1	1–3	0–2	1–0
Milani Tsnori	0–0	1–0	4–1	2–2	3–0	4–1	3–1		2–0	6–2	0–0	0–0
Lokomotivi Samtredia	0–0	1–2	3–0	0–1	2–0	1–1	1–2	2–1		2–1	0–2	0–1
Tori Borjomi	0–5	3–2	0–3	0–1	1–1	0–1	2–3	0–3	0–3		2–5	0–3
Tskhinvali	1–3	2–0	4–2	2–1	3–1	0–1	3–1	2–2	4–1	5–1		0–1
TSU Tbilisi	1–0	1–0	6–0	2–0	2–1	1–3	3–0	1–3	3–0	3–0	4–1	

Legend: Blue = home team win; Yellow = draw; Red = away team win.

== Second round ==
=== Championship group ===
Pos	Team	Pld	W	D	L	GF	GA	GD	Pts	Promotion or qualification
1	Milani Tsnori (C, P)	10	7	2	1	17	6	+11	46	Promotion to Umaglesi Liga
2	Dila Gori (P)	10	6	1	3	19	13	+6	44	Promotion to Umaglesi Liga
3	Kobuleti	10	7	0	3	11	6	+5	42	Qualification for Promotion play-offs
4	TSU Tbilisi	10	6	1	3	14	10	+4	42	
5	Lokomotivi B Tbilisi	10	2	0	8	13	18	−5	26	
6	Tskhinvali	10	0	0	10	4	25	−21	18	

Source: rsssf.org
Rules for classification: 1st points; 2nd matches won; 3rd head-to-head
(C) Champions; (P) Promoted

Home \ Away	DIL	KOB	LOK	MIL	TSK	TSU
Dila	—	2–0				
Kobuleti		—				
Lok-B			—			
Milani			1–0	—		
Tskhinvali					—	
TSU Tbilisi					2–0	—

Legend: Blue = home team win; Yellow = draw; Red = away team win.

=== Relegation group ===
Pos	Team	Pld	W	D	L	GF	GA	GD	Pts	Relegation
7	Dinamo B Tbilisi	8	6	0	2	18	6	+12	34	
8	Lazika Zugdidi	8	4	1	3	19	11	+8	22	
9	Kolkheti Khobi	8	3	2	3	11	15	−4	22	
10	Lokomotivi Samtredia	8	2	1	5	8	14	−6	17	
11	Merani-91 B Tbilisi (R)	8	2	0	6	11	21	−10	14	Relegation to Meore Liga

Source: rsssf.org
Rules for classification: 1st points; 2nd matches won; 3rd head-to-head
(R) Relegated

Home \ Away	DIN	KHO	LAZ	MER	SAM
Dinamo-B	—				
Khobi		—			
Lazika			—	6–1	
Merani-91 B				—	
Samtredia		2–0			—

Legend: Blue = home team win; Yellow = draw; Red = away team win.

== See also ==
- 2001–02 Umaglesi Liga
- 2001–02 Georgian Cup
