= 2002–03 Umaglesi Liga =

Umaglesi Liga
- Season: 2002–03
- Dates: 3 August 2002 – 30 May 2003
- Champions: Dinamo Tbilisi; 11th Georgian title
- Relegated: Gorda Rustavi; Milani Tsnori; Metalurgi Zestaponi
- Champions League: Dinamo Tbilisi
- UEFA Cup: Torpedo Kutaisi; Sioni Bolnisi
- Intertoto Cup: WIT Georgia
- Matches played: 192
- Goals scored: 469 (2.44 per match)
- Top goalscorer: Zurab Ionanidze (26)
- Biggest home win: Kolkheti 8–1 Metalurgi
- Biggest away win: Kolkheti 0–6 Locomotive
- Highest scoring: Kolkheti 8–1 Metalurgi; Torpedo 6–3 Gorda

The 2002–03 Umaglesi Liga was the fourteenth season of top-tier football in Georgia. It began on 3 August 2002 and ended on 30 May 2003. Torpedo Kutaisi were the defending champions.

== Locations ==
Location of teams in 2002–03 Umaglesi Liga

== First stage ==
=== League table ===
Pos	Team	Pld	W	D	L	GF	GA	GD	Pts	Qualification
1	Dinamo Tbilisi	22	18	2	2	50	8	+42	56	Qualification to Championship group
2	Torpedo Kutaisi	22	16	4	2	50	15	+35	52	Qualification to Championship group
3	Locomotive Tbilisi	22	16	2	4	35	10	+25	50	Qualification to Championship group
4	WIT Georgia	22	16	1	5	40	15	+25	49	Qualification to Championship group
5	Sioni Bolnisi	22	9	3	10	26	27	−1	30	Qualification to Championship group
6	Kolkheti-1913 Poti	22	9	3	10	28	33	−5	30	Qualification to Championship group
7	Merani-91 Tbilisi	22	6	5	11	25	37	−12	23	Qualification to Relegation group
8	Dila Gori	22	6	3	13	17	29	−12	21	Qualification to Relegation group
9	Dinamo Batumi	22	5	5	12	16	27	−11	20	Qualification to Relegation group
10	Metalurgi Zestaponi	22	6	1	15	17	50	−33	19	Qualification to Relegation group
11	Gorda Rustavi	22	4	1	17	22	45	−23	13	Qualification to Relegation group
12	Milani Tsnori	22	3	4	15	11	47	−36	13	Qualification to Relegation group

Source: rsssf.org
Rules for classification: 1st points; 2nd matches won; 3rd head-to-head

=== Results ===
Home \ Away	DIL	DBA	DIN	GOR	KOL	LOC	MER	MZE	MIL	SIO	TKU	WIT
Dila Gori		0–1	0–3	1–0	3–0	0–1	1–2	0–0	3–1	1–1	1–3	0–1
Dinamo Batumi	1–1		1–3	1–2	0–0	0–1	3–1	1–0	3–0	0–0	0–0	0–1
Dinamo Tbilisi	4–0	2–0		3–0	3–0	1–0	2–0	6–0	3–1	2–0	0–1	0–1
Gorda Rustavi	0–1	2–1	2–3		2–3	0–1	3–0 (Note: Match awarded as Merani's players refused to play a match in protest against non-payment of salaries.)	0–1	0–1	0–0	1–4	2–3
Kolkheti-1913 Poti	1–0	1–0	0–5	3–0		1–0	1–1	8–1	3–0 (Note: Match awarded as Milani had not paid participation fee in time.)	3–2	0–2	0–1
Locomotive Tbilisi	3–0	1–2	1–0	2–0	2–0		1–0	2–0	0–0	2–0	2–0	2–1
Merani-91 Tbilisi	1–0	2–1	1–2	– (Note: Both teams were awarded a 0–3 loss for not paying participation fee in time.)	0–0	3–2		2–3	1–1	3–2	1–1	0–2
Metalurgi Zestaponi	0–2	1–0	0–3 (Note: Match awarded as Metalurgi Zestaponi had not paid participation fee in time.)	3–1	0–2	0–5	0–3		5–0	2–1	0–2	0–3 (Note: The match between Metalurgi Zestaponi and WIT Georgia was abandoned in the 75th minute with the score of 1–3 for WIT Georgia because the home fans attacked a referee. The match was awarded with a score of 0–3.)
Milani Tsnori	0–3	0–0	0–1	1–3	2–1	0–2	2–2	1–0		1–2	0–3	0–2
Sioni Bolnisi	2–0	3–0	0–2	2–1	1–0	0–1	4–1	1–0	2–0		0–1	1–0
Torpedo Kutaisi	2–0	2–1	0–1	6–3	6–1	1–1	1–0	3–0 (Note: Match awarded as Metalurgi Zestaponi's players refused to play a match in protest against non-payment of salaries.)	5–0	4–2		1–0
WIT Georgia	2–0	4–0	1–1	2–0	2–0	1–3	2–1	4–1	3–0	3–0	1–3	

Source: rsssf.org
Legend: Blue = home team win; Yellow = draw; Red = away team win.

== Second stage ==
=== Championship group ===
==== Table ====
Pos	Team	Pld	W	D	L	GF	GA	GD	Pts	Qualification
1	Dinamo Tbilisi (C)	10	6	2	2	17	7	+10	48	Qualification for the Champions League first qualifying round
2	Torpedo Kutaisi	10	6	2	2	15	5	+10	46	Qualification for the UEFA Cup qualifying round
3	WIT Georgia	10	4	4	2	10	7	+3	41	Qualification for the Intertoto Cup first round
4	Locomotive Tbilisi	10	4	1	5	16	10	+6	38	
5	Sioni Bolnisi	10	2	2	6	9	20	−11	23	Qualification for the UEFA Cup qualifying round
6	Kolkheti-1913 Poti	10	0	5	5	5	23	−18	20	

Source: rsssf.org
Rules for classification: 1st points; 2nd matches won; 3rd head-to-head
(C) Champions

==== Results ====
Home \ Away	DIN	LOC	KOL	SIO	TKU	WIT
Dinamo Tbilisi		3–0	5–1	3–1	0–2	3–1
Locomotive Tbilisi	0–1		2–0	4–0	1–0	1–1
Kolkheti-1913 Poti	0–0	0–6		0–0	0–3	2–2
Sioni Bolnisi	1–2	2–1	2–2		2–1	0–1
Torpedo Kutaisi	1–0	2–1	0–0	5–1		0–0
WIT Georgia	0–0	1–0	3–0	1–0	0–1	

Source: rsssf.org
Legend: Blue = home team win; Yellow = draw; Red = away team win.

=== Relegation group ===
==== Table ====
Pos	Team	Pld	W	D	L	GF	GA	GD	Pts	Qualification or relegation
7	Dila Gori	10	5	3	2	15	8	+7	29	
8	Dinamo Batumi	10	5	3	2	12	5	+7	28	
9	Merani-Olimpi Tbilisi	10	4	3	3	15	5	+10	27	
10	Gorda Rustavi (R)	10	5	3	2	8	3	+5	25	Qualification to Relegation play-offs
11	Milani Tsnori (R)	10	3	4	3	7	7	0	20	Relegation to Pirveli Liga
12	Metalurgi Zestaponi (R)	10	0	0	10	0	29	−29	10	Relegation to Pirveli Liga

Source: rsssf.org
Rules for classification: 1st points; 2nd matches won; 3rd head-to-head
(R) Relegated

==== Results ====
Home \ Away	DIL	DBA	GOR	MER	MZE	MIL
Dila Gori		0–0	0–0	1–3	4–0	3–1
Dinamo Batumi	2–2		1–0	0–0	2–0	2–0
Gorda Rustavi	1–0	2–0		0–1	1–0	1–1
Merani-91 Tbilisi	1–2	0–1	0–1		6–0	0–0
Metalurgi Zestaponi	0–2	0–4	0–2	0–4		0–1
Milani Tsnori	0–1	1–0	0–0	0–0	3–0	

Source: rsssf.org
Legend: Blue = home team win; Yellow = draw; Red = away team win.

== Relegation play-offs ==
4 June 2003

Gorda-2000 Rustavi	0 – 1 (a.e.t.)	FC Mtskheta

== Top goalscorers ==
Rank	Goalscorer	Team	Goals
1	(Georgia (country)) Zurab Ionanidze	Torpedo Kutaisi	17
2	(Georgia (country)) Levan Melkadze	WIT Georgia	15
3	(Georgia (country)) Vitali Daraselia	Dinamo Tbilisi	11
4	(Georgia (country)) Alexander Koshkadze	Merani-91 Tbilisi	9
5	(Georgia (country)) David Goderdzishvili	Sioni Bolnisi	8
5	(Georgia (country)) Revaz Gotsiridze	Gorda Rustavi	8
5	(Georgia (country)) Levan Shavgulidze	Sioni Bolnisi	8
8	(Georgia (country)) Giorgi Adamia	WIT Georgia	6
8	(Georgia (country)) Malkhaz Asatiani	Torpedo Kutaisi	6
8	(Georgia (country)) Givi Didava	Torpedo Kutaisi	6
8	(Georgia (country)) Zviad Endeladze	Metalurgi Zestaponi	6
8	(Georgia (country)) Giorgi Modebadze	Dinamo Batumi	6
8	(Ukraine) Andriy Poroshyn	Torpedo Kutaisi	6

== See also ==
- 2002–03 Georgian Cup
