= 2002–03 Georgian Cup =

Tournament details
- Country: Georgia
- Teams: 54

Final positions
- Champions: Dinamo Tbilisi
- Runners-up: Sioni Bolnisi

The 2002–03 Georgian Cup (also known as the David Kipiani Cup) was the fifty-ninth season overall and thirteenth since independence of the Georgian annual football tournament.

== Round of 32 ==
The first legs were played on 24 and 26 February and the second legs were played on 28 February and 1 March 2003.

Team 1	Agg.	Team 2	1st leg	2nd leg
Locomotive Tbilisi	2–0	TSU Tbilisi	1–0	1–0
Gorda Rustavi	1–3	Spartaki Tbilisi	0–3	1–0
Sioni Bolnisi	11–3	Alazani Gurjaani	7–1	4–2
WIT Georgia	8–1	Chikhura Sachkhere	7–1	1–0
Milani Tsnori	1–0	Norchi Dinamo	1–0	0–0
Tskhinvali	2–3	Youth team	1–1	1–2
Metalurgi Zestaponi	1–7	Kobuleti	0–3	1–4
Kolkheti-1913 Poti	9–0	Lokomotivi Samtredia	6–0	3–0
Lazika Zugdidi	1–4	Guria Lanchkhuti	1–2	0–2
Torpedo Kutaisi	8–1	Samgurali Tskaltubo	5–1	3–0
Dinamo-2 Tbilisi	2–1	Iberia Samtredia	2–1	0–0
Dila Gori	4–1	WIT Georgia-2	3–0	1–1
Mtskheta	0–10	Dinamo Tbilisi	0–3	0–7
Merani Tbilisi	2–1	Locomotive-2 Tbilisi	1–0	1–1
Mertskhali Ozurgeti	6–4	Kolkheti-2 Poti	5–1	1–3
Dinamo Batumi	5–1	Kolkheti Khobi	4–1	1–0

== Round of 16 ==
The first legs were played on 5 and 6 March and the second legs were played on 9 and March 2003.

Team 1	Agg.	Team 2	1st leg	2nd leg
Dinamo Tbilisi	4–0	Dinamo Batumi	2–0	2–1
WIT Georgia	4–0	Mertskhali Ozurgeti	2–0	2–0
Locomotive Tbilisi	3–0	Merani Tbilisi	1–0	2–0
Guria Lanchkhuti	1–3	Milani Tsnori	1–0	0–3
Kobuleti	0–3	Dila Gori	0–0	0–3
Kolkheti-1913 Poti	1–2	Sioni Bolnisi	0–0	1–2
Youth team	2–5	Torpedo Kutaisi	0–4	2–1
Dinamo-2 Tbilisi	1–2	Spartaki Tbilisi	0–1	1–1

== Quarterfinals ==
The matches were played on 18 March (first legs) and 10 April 2003 (second legs).

Team 1	Agg.	Team 2	1st leg	2nd leg
Locomotive Tbilisi	1–1 (a)	Milani Tsnori	0–0	1–1
Torpedo Kutaisi	3–0	Dila Gori	1–0	2–0
Dinamo Tbilisi	2–1	WIT Georgia	1–0	1–1
Sioni Bolnisi	5–2	Spartaki Tbilisi	3–0	2–2

== Semifinals ==
The matches were played on 19 April (first legs) and 7 May 2003 (second legs).

Team 1	Agg.	Team 2	1st leg	2nd leg
Locomotive Tbilisi	1–6	Dinamo Tbilisi	0–4	1–2
Sioni Bolnisi	1–0	Torpedo Kutaisi	1–0	0–0

== Final ==
26 May 2003

Dinamo Tbilisi	3–1	Sioni Bolnisi
Khizaneishvili 10'; Daraselia 17'; Anchabadze 45'		Isiani 75'

Mikheil Meskhi Stadium, Tbilisi
Attendance: 6,000
Referee: Merab Malaghuradze (Tbilisi)

== See also ==
- 2002–03 Umaglesi Liga
