= 2006 Commonwealth of Independent States Cup =

CIS Cup, Кубок Содружества 2006

Tournament details
- Host country: Russia
- Dates: 14–22 January 2006
- Teams: 16
- Venues: 2 (in 1 host city)

Final positions
- Champions: (Azerbaijan) Neftchi Baku (1st title)

Tournament statistics
- Matches played: 30
- Goals scored: 84 (2.8 per match)
- Top scorer(s): (Ukraine) Yevhen Seleznyov (5 goals)

The 2006 Commonwealth of Independent States Cup was the fourteenth edition of the competition between the champions of former republics of Soviet Union. It was won by Neftchi Baku for the first time.

== Participants ==
Team	Qualification	Participation
(Russia) CSKA Moscow	2005 Russian Premier League champions ^{1}	2nd
(Ukraine) Shakhtar Donetsk	2004–05 Vyshcha Liha champions ^{2}	3rd
(Belarus) Shakhtyor Soligorsk	2005 Belarusian Premier League champions	1st
(Lithuania) FBK Kaunas	2005 A Lyga runners-up ^{3}	8th
(Latvia) Liepājas Metalurgs	2005 Latvian Higher League champions	1st
(Estonia) TVMK Tallinn	2005 Meistriliiga champions	1st
(Moldova) Sheriff Tiraspol	2004–05 Moldovan National Division champions	5th
(Georgia (country)) Dinamo Tbilisi	2004–05 Umaglesi Liga champions	10th
(Armenia) Pyunik Yerevan	2005 Armenian Premier League champions	7th
(Azerbaijan) Neftchi Baku	2004–05 Azerbaijan Top League champions	5th
(Kazakhstan) Aktobe	2005 Kazakhstan Premier League champions	1st
(Uzbekistan) Pakhtakor Tashkent	2005 Uzbek League champions	5th
(Tajikistan) Vakhsh Qurghonteppa	2005 Tajik League champions	2nd
(Turkmenistan) HTTU Ashgabat	2005 Ýokary Liga champions	1st
(Kyrgyzstan) Dordoi-Dynamo Naryn	2005 Kyrgyzstan League champions	2nd
Russia U19	Unofficial entry, not eligible to advance past group stage	7th

- ^{1} CSKA Moscow were represented by reserve players.
- ^{2} Shakhtar Donetsk were represented by Shakhtar-2 players.
- ^{3} FBK Kaunas replaced Ekranas Panevėžys (2005 Lithuanian champions) who refused to participate.

== Group stage ==
=== Group A ===
Team	Pld	W	D	L	GF	GA	GD	Pts
(Russia) CSKA Moscow	3	3	0	0	6	3	+3	9
(Uzbekistan) Pakhtakor Tashkent	3	2	0	1	8	5	+3	6
(Georgia (country)) Dinamo Tbilisi	3	0	1	2	1	3	−2	1
(Estonia) TVMK Tallinn	3	0	1	2	0	4	−4	1

==== Results ====
14 January 2006
19:00

Dinamo Tbilisi (Georgia (country))	0 – 1	(Russia) CSKA Moscow
		Kirilenko 74'

Olympic Sport Complex, Moscow
Attendance: 7,000
Referee: Romāns Lajuks (Latvia)
14 January 2006
19:00

Pakhtakor Tashkent (Uzbekistan)	3 – 0	(Estonia) TVMK Tallinn
Tadjiyev 31'; Djeparov 68'; Suyunov 71'

Dynamo Manage, Moscow
Attendance: 150
Referee: Ghenadie Orlic (Moldova)

15 January 2006
19:00

CSKA Moscow (Russia)	1 – 0	(Estonia) TVMK Tallinn
Kirilenko 36'

Olympic Sport Complex, Moscow
Attendance: 2,000
Referee: Ihor Ishchenko (Ukraine)
15 January 2006
19:00

Dinamo Tbilisi (Georgia (country))	1 – 2	(Uzbekistan) Pakhtakor Tashkent
Bobokhidze 76'		Ponomarev 7'; Soliev 61'

Dynamo Manage, Moscow
Attendance: 650
Referee: Aleksandr Gvardis (Russia)

17 January 2006
19:00

CSKA Moscow (Russia)	4 – 3	(Uzbekistan) Pakhtakor Tashkent
Salugin 4', 20'; Taranov 7'; Aleksei Blokha 78'		Tadjiyev 17', 79' (pen.), 82'

Olympic Sport Complex, Moscow
Attendance: 800
Referee: Paulius Malžinskas (Lithuania)
17 January 2006
19:00

TVMK Tallinn (Estonia)	0 – 0	(Georgia (country)) Dinamo Tbilisi

Dynamo Manage, Moscow
Attendance: 150
Referee: Stanislav Sukhina (Russia)

=== Group B ===
Team	Pld	W	D	L	GF	GA	GD	Pts
(Azerbaijan) Neftchi Baku	3	2	1	0	6	2	+4	7
(Latvia) Liepājas Metalurgs	3	2	0	1	6	3	+3	6
(Kazakhstan) Aktobe	3	1	1	1	2	4	−2	4
(Tajikistan) Vakhsh Qurghonteppa	3	0	0	3	1	6	−5	0

==== Results ====
14 January 2006
15:00

Liepājas Metalurgs (Latvia)	3 – 0	(Kazakhstan) Aktobe
Astrauskas 6'; Karlsons 37'; Grebis 88'

Olympic Sport Complex, Moscow
Attendance: 700
Referee: Aleksei Kulbakov (Belarus)
14 January 2006
15:00

Neftchi Baku (Azerbaijan)	3 – 0	(Tajikistan) Vakhsh Qurghonteppa
Subašić 6'; Hacıyev 26'; Mišura 73'

Dynamo Manage, Moscow
Attendance: 700
Referee: Paulius Malžinskas (Lithuania)

15 January 2006
15:00

Liepājas Metalurgs (Latvia)	1 – 2	(Azerbaijan) Neftchi Baku
Ivanovs 64' (pen.)		Adamia 25', 31'

Olympic Sport Complex, Moscow
Attendance: 1,000
Referee: Igor Egorov (Russia)
15 January 2006
15:00

Aktobe (Kazakhstan)	1 – 0	(Tajikistan) Vakhsh Qurghonteppa
Golovskoy 57' (pen.)

Dynamo Manage, Moscow
Attendance: 400
Referee: Mamed Mamedov (Turkmenistan)

17 January 2006
15:00

Aktobe (Kazakhstan)	1 – 1	(Azerbaijan) Neftchi Baku
Suchkov 39'		Subašić 61'

Olympic Sport Complex, Moscow
Attendance: 300
Referee: Ghenadie Orlic (Moldova)
17 January 2006
15:00

Vakhsh Qurghonteppa (Tajikistan)	1 – 2	(Latvia) Liepājas Metalurgs
Khuseynov 79'		Karlsons 63', 90'

Dynamo Manage, Moscow
Attendance: 150
Referee: Emil Busurmankulov (Kyrgyzstan)

=== Group C ===
Team	Pld	W	D	L	GF	GA	GD	Pts
(Ukraine) Shakhtar Donetsk	3	2	0	1	8	4	+4	6
(Moldova) Sheriff Tiraspol	3	2	0	1	10	3	+7	6
(Turkmenistan) HTTU Ashgabat	3	2	0	1	4	5	−1	6
(Kyrgyzstan) Dordoi-Dynamo Naryn	3	0	0	3	0	10	−10	0

- 3-way tie-breaker between tied teams:

Team	Pld	W	D	L	GF	GA	GD	Pts
(Ukraine) Shakhtar Donetsk	2	1	0	1	7	4	+3	3
(Moldova) Sheriff Tiraspol	2	1	0	1	3	3	0	3
(Turkmenistan) HTTU Ashgabat	2	1	0	1	2	5	−3	3

==== Results ====
14 January 2006
17:00

Sheriff Tiraspol (Moldova)	3 – 2	(Ukraine) Shakhtar Donetsk
Epureanu 20'; Florescu 26'; Korotetskyi 53' (o.g.)		Fomin 6'; Havrysh 74'

Olympic Sport Complex, Moscow
Attendance: 1,500
Referee: Yuri Baskakov (Russia)
14 January 2006
17:00

HTTU Ashgabat (Turkmenistan)	2 – 0	(Kyrgyzstan) Dordoi-Dynamo Naryn
Garadanow 62', 81'

Dynamo Manage, Moscow
Attendance: 300
Referee: Sergey Tsaregradskiy (Kazakhstan)

15 January 2006
17:00

Shakhtar Donetsk (Ukraine)	1 – 0	(Kyrgyzstan) Dordoi-Dynamo Naryn
Seleznyov 80'

Olympic Sport Complex, Moscow
Attendance: 1,000
Referee: Hannes Kaasik (Estonia)
15 January 2006
17:00

Sheriff Tiraspol (Moldova)	0 – 1	(Turkmenistan) HTTU Ashgabat
		Çöliýew 64'

Dynamo Manage, Moscow
Attendance: 500
Referee: Fariz Yusifov (Azerbaijan)

17 January 2006
17:00

HTTU Ashgabat (Turkmenistan)	1 – 5	(Ukraine) Shakhtar Donetsk
Şamyradow 86'		Seleznyov 9', 45', 60', 69'; Pivnenko 13'

Olympic Sport Complex, Moscow
Attendance: 600
Referee: Nikolai Ivanov (Russia)
17 January 2006
17:00

Dordoi-Dynamo Naryn (Kyrgyzstan)	0 – 7	(Moldova) Sheriff Tiraspol
		Cociș 2'; Florescu 20', 55' (pen.); Omotoyossi 23'; Dermé 73'; Kuchuk 79', 89'

Dynamo Manage, Moscow
Attendance: 150
Referee: Aleksei Kulbakov (Belarus)

=== Group D ===
- Unofficial table

Team	Pld	W	D	L	GF	GA	GD	Pts
Russia U19	3	2	0	1	3	4	−1	6
(Lithuania) FBK Kaunas	3	1	1	1	4	2	+2	4
(Belarus) Shakhtyor Soligorsk	3	1	1	1	4	3	+1	4
(Armenia) Pyunik Yerevan	3	1	0	2	3	5	−2	3

- Official table

Team	Pld	W	D	L	GF	GA	GD	Pts
(Lithuania) FBK Kaunas	2	1	1	0	4	1	+3	4
(Armenia) Pyunik Yerevan	2	1	0	1	2	3	−1	3
(Belarus) Shakhtyor Soligorsk	2	0	1	1	1	3	−2	1

==== Results ====
14 January 2006
13:00

Pyunik Yerevan (Armenia)	0 – 3	(Lithuania) FBK Kaunas
		Pehlić 10'; Pilibaitis 77'; Kšanavičius 79'

Olympic Sport Complex, Moscow
Attendance: 400
Referee: Stanislav Sukhina (Russia)
14 January 2006
13:00

Russia U19	0 – 3	(Belarus) Shakhtyor Soligorsk
		Klimenka 26', 40'; Bychanok 87'

Dynamo Manage, Moscow
Attendance: 400
Referee: Nail Lutfullin (Uzbekistan)

15 January 2006
13:00

Shakhtyor Soligorsk (Belarus)	0 – 2	(Armenia) Pyunik Yerevan
		Mkrtchyan 45' (pen.); Pachajyan 87'

Olympic Sport Complex, Moscow
Attendance: 300
Referee: Igor Zakharov (Russia)
15 January 2006
13:00

FBK Kaunas (Lithuania)	0 – 1	Russia U19
		Samsonov 35'

Dynamo Manage, Moscow
Attendance: 300
Referee: Emil Busurmankulov (Kyrgyzstan)

17 January 2006
13:00

Shakhtyor Soligorsk (Belarus)	1 – 1	(Lithuania) FBK Kaunas
Hukayla 90'		Papečkys 45'

Olympic Sport Complex, Moscow
Attendance: 150
Referee: Rustam Kholov (Tajikistan)
17 January 2006
13:00

Russia U19	2 – 1	(Armenia) Pyunik Yerevan
Maksimov 8' (pen.), 66'		Aghasyan 30'

Dynamo Manage, Moscow
Attendance: 400
Referee: Sergey Tsaregradskiy (Kazakhstan)

== Final rounds ==
Quarterfinals (18 Jan)
(Russia)	CSKA Moscow	3
(Latvia)	Liepājas Metalurgs	1
(Lithuania)	FBK Kaunas (p)	1
(Moldova)	Sheriff Tiraspol	1
(Azerbaijan)	Neftchi Baku (p)	0
(Uzbekistan)	Pakhtakor Tashkent	0
(Ukraine)	Shakhtar Donetsk	1
(Armenia)	Pyunik Yerevan	3

Semifinals (20 Jan)
(Russia)	CSKA Moscow	1
(Lithuania)	FBK Kaunas (p)	1
(Azerbaijan)	Neftchi Baku (w/o)	3
(Armenia)	Pyunik Yerevan	0

Final (22 Jan)
(Lithuania)	FBK Kaunas	2
(Azerbaijan)	Neftchi Baku	4

=== Quarterfinals ===
18 January 2006
13:00

FBK Kaunas (Lithuania)	1 – 1	(Moldova) Sheriff Tiraspol
Žaliūkas 31'		Kuchuk 3'
Penalties
Manchkhava (penalty scored); Velička (penalty scored); Juška (penalty scored); Pilibaitis (penalty scored); Kančelskis (penalty scored)	5 – 3	(penalty scored) Ionescu; (penalty scored) Humenyuk; (penalty missed) Florescu; (penalty scored) Cociș

Olympic Sport Complex, Moscow
Attendance: 1,000
Referee: Fariz Yusifov (Azerbaijan)
18 January 2006
15:00

Neftchi Baku (Azerbaijan)	0 – 0	(Uzbekistan) Pakhtakor Tashkent
Penalties
Boreț (penalty scored); Subašić (penalty scored); Nabiyev (penalty scored); Hacıyev (penalty scored)	4 – 2	(penalty scored) Djeparov; (penalty missed) Kapadze; (penalty scored) Aliqulov; (penalty missed) Suyunov

Olympic Sport Complex, Moscow
Attendance: 1,000
Referee: Yuri Baskakov (Russia)
18 January 2006
17:00

Shakhtar Donetsk (Ukraine)	1 – 3	(Armenia) Pyunik Yerevan
Karamushka 88'		Gharabaghtsyan 25'; Nazaryan 56' (pen.); Sahakyan 90'

Olympic Sport Complex, Moscow
Attendance: 2,000
Referee: Romāns Lajuks (Latvia)
18 January 2006
19:00

CSKA Moscow (Russia)	3 – 1	(Latvia) Liepājas Metalurgs
Franțuz 31'; Salugin 62'; Jemeļins 68' (o.g.)		Astrauskas 3'

Olympic Sport Complex, Moscow
Attendance: 2,000
Referee: Karen Nalbandyan (Armenia)

=== Semifinals ===
20 January 2006
16:00

Neftchi Baku (Azerbaijan)	3 – 0^{1}	(Armenia) Pyunik Yerevan

Olympic Sport Complex, Moscow

^{1} Neftchi were awarded a win after Pyunik refused to play against Azerbaijani club for safety concerns (related to ongoing Nagorno-Karabakh conflict).

20 January 2006
19:00

CSKA Moscow (Russia)	1 – 1	(Lithuania) FBK Kaunas
Taranov 57'		Juška 9'
Penalties
Taranov (penalty missed); Stepanets (penalty scored); Grigoryev (penalty scored); Vasilyev (penalty scored); Salugin (penalty scored)	4 – 5	(penalty scored) Rimkevičius; (penalty scored) Ivaškevičius; (penalty scored) Manchkhava; (penalty scored) Poderis; (penalty scored) Kančelskis

Olympic Sport Complex, Moscow
Attendance: 500
Referee: Ihor Ishchenko (Ukraine)

=== Finals ===
22 January 2006
13:00

FBK Kaunas (Lithuania)	2 – 4	(Azerbaijan) Neftchi Baku
Pacevicius 31'; Zelmikas 41'		Nabiyev 34'; Boreț 37'; Subašić 47'; Petrov 57'

Olympic Sport Complex, Moscow
Attendance: 4,000
Referee: Romāns Lajuks (Latvia)

== Top scorers ==
Rank	Player	Team	Goals
1	(Ukraine) Yevhen Seleznyov	(Ukraine) Shakhtar Donetsk	5
2	(Uzbekistan) Zayniddin Tadjiyev	(Uzbekistan) Pakhtakor Tashkent	4
3	(Serbia and Montenegro) Branimir Subašić	(Azerbaijan) Neftchi Baku	3
3	(Russia) Aleksandr Salugin	(Russia) CSKA Moscow	3
3	(Romania) George Florescu	(Moldova) Sheriff Tiraspol	3
3	(Belarus) Aliaksei Kuchuk	(Moldova) Sheriff Tiraspol	3
3	(Latvia) Ģirts Karlsons	(Latvia) Liepājas Metalurgs	3
