= 2011 UEFA European Under-21 Championship qualification Group 2 =

Football tournament qualification stage

The teams competing in Group 2 of the 2011 UEFA European Under-21 Championships qualifying competition were Armenia, Estonia, Georgia, Republic of Ireland, Switzerland and Turkey.

== Standings ==
Team	Pld	W	D	L	GF	GA	GD	Pts	(Switzerland)	(Turkey)	(Georgia (country))	(Armenia)	(Estonia)	(Republic of Ireland)
Switzerland	10	6	2	2	15	8	+7	20	—	0–2	1–0	2–1	0–1	1–0
Turkey	10	5	1	4	13	11	+2	16	1–3	—	0–1	1–0	0–0	1–0
Georgia	10	4	3	3	12	9	+3	15	0–0	4–0	—	0–2	2–0	1–1
Armenia	10	4	1	5	18	19	−1	13	1–3	2–5	2–3	—	1–1	4–1
Estonia	10	3	3	4	9	16	−7	12	1–4	1–0	2–0	2–3	—	1–1
Republic of Ireland	10	1	4	5	11	15	−4	7	1–1	0–3	1–1	1–2	5–0	—

== Matches ==
31 March 2009
20:45 CEST

Republic of Ireland	0–3	Turkey
	Report	D. Yılmaz 13'; Özkan 42'; Şişmanoğlu 90+1'

Turner's Cross, Cork
Referee: Stanislav Todorov (Bulgaria)

5 June 2009
20:00 CEST

Switzerland	2–1	Armenia
Derdiyok 16'; Gashi 20'	Report	Manasyan 84'

Stadion Bergholz, Wil
Referee: Boško Jovanetić (Serbia)

9 June 2009
17:00 CEST

Armenia	2–5	Turkey
Mkhitaryan 71'; Dashyan 81'	Report	D. Yılmaz 5'; A. Yılmaz 45+1'; Bıkmaz 49' (pen.); Pektemek 60'; Gökoğlan 72'

Republican Stadium, Yerevan
Referee: Christof Virant (Belgium)

12 August 2009
18:00 CEST

Switzerland	0–1	Estonia
	Report	Saag 31'

Stadion Breite, Schaffhausen
Referee: Christopher Lautier (Malta)

4 September 2009
14:00 CEST

Armenia	1–3	Switzerland
Yagan 10'	Report	Hochstrasser 4'; Rossini 35'; Feltscher 39'

MIKA Sport Complex, Yerevan
Referee: Leontios Trattou (Cyprus)
5 September 2009
16:00 CEST

Estonia	2–0	Georgia
Mošnikov 42'; Anier 90'	Report

A. Le Coq Arena, Tallinn
Referee: Magnus Thorisson (Iceland)

9 September 2009
14:00 CEST

Georgia	4–0	Turkey
Ivanishvili 1'; Khidesheli 35'; Totadze 80'; Gugava 88'	Report

David Abashidze Stadium, Zestaponi
Referee: Antonio Rubinos Pérez (Spain)
9 September 2009
16:00 CEST

Estonia	1–1	Republic of Ireland
Saag 4'	Report	Sheridan 7'

Linnastaadion, Rakvere
Referee: Viktor Shvetsov (Ukraine)

9 October 2009
15:00 CEST

Estonia	1–4	Switzerland
Zenjov 7'	Report	Ciarrocchi 10'; Gavranović 21'; Feltscher 23'; Koch 26'

Kadrioru, Tallinn
Referee: Jan Jílek (Czech Republic)
9 October 2009
20:45 CEST

Republic of Ireland	1–1	Georgia
Judge 28'	Report	Ivanishvili 89'

Tallaght Stadium, Dublin
Referee: Georgios Daloukas (Greece)

13 October 2009
18:00 CEST

Turkey	1–0	Armenia
A. Yılmaz 90+4'	Report

Eskişehir Atatürk, Eskişehir
Referee: Alexandru Deaconu (Romania)
13 October 2009
20:45 CEST

Republic of Ireland	1–1	Switzerland
Garvan 90+3'	Report	Frei 58'

Regional Sports Center, Waterford
Referee: Alfonso Pérez Burrull (Spain)

14 November 2009
10:00 CEST

Georgia	1–1	Republic of Ireland
Kvaratskhelia 84'	Report	Carey 48'

Mikheil Meskhi Stadium, Tbilisi
Referee: Tom Harald Hagen (Norway)
14 November 2009
11:00 CEST

Armenia	1–1	Estonia
Mkhitaryan 24'	Report	Artjunin 90+2'

Republican Stadium, Yerevan
Referee: Igor Egorov (Russia)
14 November 2009
17:00 CEST

Turkey	1–3	Switzerland
Erkin 51'	Report	Stocker 7', 43'; Gashi 89'

Hüseyin Avni Aker Stadium, Trabzon
Referee: Marcin Borski (Poland)

17 November 2009
12:00 CEST

Armenia	4–1	Republic of Ireland
Mkhitaryan 30', 61', 84' (pen.); Goharyan 75'	Report	Sheridan 65'

Republican Stadium, Yerevan
Referee: Radek Příhoda (Czech Republic)
18 November 2009
16:00 CEST

Turkey	0–0	Estonia
	Report

Rize Atatürk, Rize
Referee: Draženko Kovačić (Croatia)
18 November 2009
19:00 CEST

Switzerland	1–0	Georgia
Gavranović 43'	Report

Cornaredo Stadium, Lugano
Referee: Novo Panić (Bosnia and Herzegovina)

3 March 2010
12:00 CEST

Georgia	2–0	Estonia
Barabadze 44'; Ananidze 90+2'	Report

Mikheil Meskhi Stadium, Tbilisi
Referee: Marios Stamatis (Cyprus)
3 March 2010
20:30 CEST

Republic of Ireland	1–2	Armenia
Daly 80'	Report	Hayrapetyan 34'; Ghazaryan 40'

Tallaght Stadium, Dublin
Referee: Nerijus Dunauskas (Lithuania)

20 May 2010
17:45 CEST

Estonia	2–3	Armenia
Saag 33'; Kallaste 80'	Report	Ghazaryan 18', 68'; Manoyan 55'

Kadrioru, Tallinn
Referee: Petur Reinert (Faroe Islands)

23 May 2010
16:00 CEST

Estonia	1–0	Turkey
Saag 13'	Report

Kadrioru, Tallinn
Referee: Dragomir Stankovic (Serbia)

26 May 2010
20:15 CEST

Switzerland	0–2	Turkey
	Report	Affolter 66' (o.g.); Çek 89'

AFG Arena, St. Gallen
Referee: Alan Muir (Scotland)

30 May 2010
17:00 CEST

Georgia	0–0	Switzerland
	Report

Boris Paichadze Stadium, Tbilisi
Referee: Richard Trutz (Slovakia)

10 August 2010
20:30 CEST

Republic of Ireland	5–0	Estonia
Stokes 15', 30' (pen.); McCarthy 62'; Hourihane 86'; Garvan 90+1'	Report

Tallaght Stadium, Dublin
Referee: Pol van Boekel (Netherlands)
11 August 2010
15:00 CEST

Armenia	2–3	Georgia
Mkhitaryan 78' (pen.); V. Poghosyan 88'	Report	Ananidze 36' (pen.); Vatsadze 50'; Kvekveskiri 81'

Republican Stadium, Yerevan
Referee: Dimitar Meckarovski (Macedonia)

3 September 2010
20:00 CEST

Switzerland	1–0	Republic of Ireland
Frei 48'	Report

Cornaredo Stadium, Lugano
Referee: Sergei Karasev (Russia)
4 September 2010
17:00 CEST

Turkey	0–1	Georgia
	Report	Kaldırım 50' (o.g.)

Sakarya Atatürk, Sakarya
Referee: Slavko Vinčić (Slovenia)

7 September 2010
17:00 CEST

Turkey	1–0	Republic of Ireland
Tevfik Köse 81'	Report

Ismet Pasa, Kocaeli
Referee: Aleksandar Stavrev (Macedonia)
7 September 2010
17:00 CEST

Georgia	0–2	Armenia
	Report	Dashyan 90+2'; Poghosyan 90+3'

Mikheil Meskhi Stadium, Tbilisi
Referee: Artyom Kuchin (Kazakhstan)

== Goalscorers ==
As of 4 September, there have been 75 goals scored over 28 games, for an average of 2.68 goals per game.

Goals	Player	Country
6	Henrik Mkhitaryan	Armenia
4	Kaimar Saag	Estonia
3	Gevorg Ghazaryan	Armenia
2	Zhano Ananidze	Georgia
2	Giorgi Ivanishvili	Georgia
2	Owen Garvan	Republic of Ireland
2	Cillian Sheridan	Republic of Ireland
2	Anthony Stokes	Republic of Ireland
2	Frank Feltscher	Switzerland
2	Fabian Frei	Switzerland
2	Shkelzen Gashi	Switzerland
2	Mario Gavranović	Switzerland
2	Valentin Stocker	Switzerland
2	Valter Poghosyan	Armenia
2	Artak Dashyan	Armenia

1 goal

Armenia
- Hovhannes Goharyan
- Levon Hayrapetyan
- Mihran Manasyan
- David Manoyan
- Hiraç Yagan

Estonia
- Henri Anier
- Artjom Artjunin
- Ken Kallaste
- Sergei Mošnikov
- Sergei Zenjov

Georgia
- Revazi Barabadze
- Giorgi Gugava
- Giorgi Khidesheli
- Vakhtang Kvaratskhelia
- Nika Kvekveskiri
- Lasha Totadze
- Mate Vatsadze

Republic of Ireland
- Graham Carey
- Ian Daly
- Conor Hourihane
- Alan Judge
- James McCarthy

Switzerland
- Alessandro Ciarrocchi
- Eren Derdiyok
- Xavier Hochstrasser
- Philippe Koch
- Jonathan Rossini

Turkey
- Ferhat Bıkmaz
- Özgür Çek
- Caner Erkin
- Yiğit Gökoğlan
- Emre Özkan
- Mustafa Pektemek
- Ömer Şişmanoğlu

Own Goals

- (Switzerland) François Affolter (for Turkey)
- (Turkey) Hasan Ali Kaldırım (for Georgia)
