= 2004–05 Pirveli Liga =

2004–05 Pirveli Liga was the 16th season of the Georgian Pirveli Liga.

== League standings ==
Pos	Team	Pld	W	D	L	GF	GA	GD	Pts	Promotion or relegation
1	Ameri Tbilisi (C, P)	30	23	3	4	93	18	+75	72	Promotion to Umaglesi Liga
2	Borjomi (P)	30	22	3	5	74	36	+38	69	Promotion to Umaglesi Liga
3	Spartaki Tbilisi (P)	30	16	9	5	52	36	+16	57	Promotion to Umaglesi Liga
4	Kakheti Telavi (P)	30	17	4	9	57	41	+16	55	Promotion to Umaglesi Liga
5	WIT-Georgia B Tbilisi	30	16	7	7	49	28	+21	55	
6	Dinamo B Tbilisi	30	16	1	13	64	50	+14	49	
7	Tskhinvali (P)	30	14	4	12	39	36	+3	46	Promotion to Umaglesi Liga
8	Chikhura Sachkhere	30	12	7	11	38	35	+3	43	
9	Lokomotivi B Tbilisi	30	10	8	12	33	40	−7	38 (Note: Lokomotivi B 2-2 Guria; Guria 1-1 Lokomotivi B)	
10	Guria Lanchkhuti	30	10	8	12	30	45	−15	38	
11	Rustavi	30	10	7	13	39	43	−4	37	
12	Olimpi Tbilisi	30	10	5	15	35	44	−9	35 (Note: Olimpi 1-1 Iveria; Iveria 1-4 Olimpi)	Renamed to Tbilisi B?
13	Iveria Khashuri (R)	30	10	5	15	31	45	−14	35	Relegation to Meore Liga
14	Milani-Merani Tsnori	30	8	4	18	35	53	−18	28	Renamed to Milani Tbilisi
15	Sagarejo	30	4	5	21	26	70	−44	17	
16	Magharoeli Chiatura	30	0	4	26	17	92	−75	4	

Source: rsssf.org
Rules for classification: 1) Points; 2) Number of wins; 3) Head-to-head record
(C) Champions; (P) Promoted; (R) Relegated

== See also ==
- 2004–05 Umaglesi Liga
- 2004–05 Georgian Cup
