= 2000–01 Pirveli Liga =

2000–01 Pirveli Liga was the 12th season of the second-tier football in Georgia.

== History ==
Following new regulations announced by the Football Federation, the number of team represented in this league sustained almost a four-time reduction. The format of the tournament also underwent significant changes. Twelve teams played 22 matches each and later, on the 2nd stage, formed Championship and Relegation groups based on the league standings. Milani was the only club among them to make a debut in the 2nd division this season.

The season started on 12 September 2000 and ended on 22 May 2001 with a play-off game held on 27 May. Eventually, Guria and Metalurgi gained automatic promotion to the Umaglesi Liga followed by Samgurali who prevailed over Dila in the play-offs.

== League standings ==
=== Regular season ===
Pos	Team	Pld	W	D	L	GF	GA	GD	Pts
1	Milani	22	13	3	6	37	18	+19	42
2	Metalurgi	22	12	6	4	36	19	+17	42
3	Guria	22	12	5	5	31	25	+6	41
4	Shukura	22	12	4	6	33	18	+15	40
5	Spartaki	22	12	3	7	47	24	+23	39
6	Samgurali	22	12	3	7	40	22	+18	39
7	Tori	22	8	5	9	22	19	+3	29
8	Kolkheti	22	6	7	9	18	24	−6	25
9	Dinamo Zugdidi	22	7	3	12	29	51	−22	24
10	Okeane	22	5	4	13	22	40	−18	19
11	Norchi Dinamoeli	22	5	2	15	11	34	−23	17
12	Iveria	22	4	3	15	12	44	−32	15

Source: Soccerway

=== Championship Group ===
Before the clubs resumed their league campaign, their points were halved with the following new standings:

P	Clubs	Pts
1	Metalurgi	21
2	Milani	21
3	Guria	21
4	Spartaki	20
5	Samgurali	20
6	Shukura	20

Standings after 2nd phase:

Pos	Team	Pld	W	D	L	GF	GA	GD	Pts
1	Guria	10	6	2	2	15	9	+6	20
2	Metalurgi	10	5	2	3	12	12	0	17
3	Samgurali	10	5	3	2	13	7	+6	18
4	Milani	10	5	1	4	16	7	+9	16
5	Spartaki	10	2	3	5	9	15	−6	9
6	Shukura	10	0	3	7	4	19	−15	3

Source: Soccerway

Final standings
P	Clubs	Pts
1	Guria	41
2	Metallurgi	38
3	Samgurali	38
4	Milani	21
5	Spartaki	20
6	Shukura	20

=== Relegation Group ===
Standings after the points were halved:

P	Clubs	Pts
1	Tori	15
2	Kolkheti	13
3	Dinamo Zugdidi	12
4	Okeane	10
5	Norchi Dinamoeli	9
6	Iveria	8

Standings after 2nd phase:

Pos	Team	Pld	W	D	L	GF	GA	GD	Pts
1	Kolkheti	10	6	1	3	18	10	+8	19
2	Tori	10	5	2	3	23	9	+14	17
3	Okeane	10	6	3	1	17	7	+10	21
4	Iveria	10	5	2	3	12	8	+4	17
5	Norchi Dinamoeli	10	4	0	6	7	15	−8	12
6	Dinamo Zugdidi	10	0	0	10	0	28	−28	0

Source: Soccerway

Final standings
P	Clubs	Pts
1	Kolkheti	32
2	Tori	32
3	Okeane	31
4	Iveria	25
5	Norchi Dinamoeli	21
6	Dinamo Zugdidi	12

=== Play-off ===
27 May 2001

Dila	0–2	Samgurali

With this victory Samgurali secured an immediate return to the Umaglesi Liga.

== See also ==
- 2000–01 Umaglesi Liga
- 2000–01 Georgian Cup
