= 2003–04 Umaglesi Liga =

Umaglesi Liga
- Season: 2003–04
- Dates: 26 July 2003 – 30 May 2004
- Champions: WIT Georgia; 1st Georgian title
- Relegated: Mtskheta-Urioni; Spartaki-Lazika Zugdidi; Mertskhali Ozurgeti
- Champions League: WIT Georgia
- UEFA Cup: Dinamo Tbilisi; FC Tbilisi
- Intertoto Cup: Dila Gori
- Matches played: 193
- Goals scored: 483 (2.5 per match)
- Top goalscorer: Suliko Davitashvili (20)
- Biggest home win: Tbilisi 8–0 Spartaki-Lazika
- Biggest away win: Kolkheti 0–6 Tbilisi
- Highest scoring: Dinamo Tbilisi 8–1 Mertskhali

The 2003–04 Umaglesi Liga was the fifteenth season of top-tier football in Georgia. It began on 26 July 2003 and ended on 30 May 2004 with a championship playoff match. Dinamo Tbilisi were the defending champions.

== Locations ==
Location of teams in 2003–04 Umaglesi Liga

== First stage ==
=== League table ===
Pos	Team	Pld	W	D	L	GF	GA	GD	Pts	Qualification
1	Dinamo Tbilisi	22	15	5	2	49	8	+41	50	Qualification to Championship group
2	WIT Georgia	22	12	6	4	38	15	+23	42	Qualification to Championship group
3	Sioni Bolnisi	22	11	7	4	31	18	+13	40	Qualification to Championship group
4	FC Tbilisi	22	10	5	7	41	26	+15	35	Qualification to Championship group
5	Locomotive Tbilisi	22	10	4	8	32	24	+8	34 (Note: Head-to-head goal difference: Locomotive Tbilisi 6–5 (+1), Dila Gori 3–3 (0), Torpedo Kutaisi 4–5 (–1).)	Qualification to Championship group
6	Dila Gori	22	10	4	8	28	20	+8	34	Qualification to Championship group
7	Torpedo Kutaisi	22	10	4	8	27	26	+1	34	Qualification to Relegation group
8	Dinamo Batumi	22	10	2	10	26	28	−2	32	Qualification to Relegation group
9	Kolkheti-1913 Poti	22	7	3	12	18	35	−17	24	Qualification to Relegation group
10	Mtskheta-Urioni	22	6	2	14	25	55	−30	20	Qualification to Relegation group
11	Spartaki-Lazika Zugdidi	22	4	4	14	14	47	−33	16	Qualification to Relegation group
12	Mertskhali Ozurgeti	22	2	4	16	18	45	−27	10	Qualification to Relegation group

Source: rsssf.org
Rules for classification: 1st points; 2nd matches won; 3rd head-to-head

=== Results ===
Home \ Away	DIL	DBA	DIN	KOL	LOC	MRT	MTS	SIO	SPL	TBI	TKU	WIT
Dila Gori		2–1	0–0	0–0	1–0	2–1	5–1	2–0	1–0	1–2	1–0	3–0
Dinamo Batumi	1–0		0–1	0–1	1–3	3–2	2–0	0–0	2–1	1–0	4–0	1–3
Dinamo Tbilisi	2–0	5–0		2–0	1–0	8–1	3–1	0–0	6–0	3–0	3–0	0–0
Kolkheti-1913 Poti	0–0	0–3	2–1		2–1	1–3	3–2	1–1	3–0	0–6	0–2	0–2
Locomotive Tbilisi	2–1	3–2	0–1	2–0		1–0	4–0	1–1	1–1	0–1	3–0	2–1
Mertskhali Ozurgeti	0–0	0–1	0–2	1–3	1–2		1–1	0–1	2–3	2–1	0–0	0–1
Mtskheta-Urioni	0–1	0–1	2–0	3–1	2–1	2–2		0–4	2–1	3–2	1–5	1–4
Sioni Bolnisi	4–3	1–0	1–3	3–0	3–1	4–1	2–0		1–0	1–1	1–0	0–0
Spartaki-Lazika Zugdidi	0–3	1–1	0–3	1–0	0–2	2–0	2–1	0–1		0–3	1–1	1–4
FC Tbilisi	2–1	0–1	0–4	1–0	1–1	3–1	3–1	1–1	8–0		4–2	1–1
Torpedo Kutaisi	1–0	2–0	1–1	1–0	3–1	2–0	1–2	2–1	0–0	2–1		2–1
WIT Georgia	3–1	3–1	0–0	0–1	1–1	2–0	7–0	2–0	2–0	0–0	1–0	

Source: rsssf.org
Legend: Blue = home team win; Yellow = draw; Red = away team win.

== Second stage ==
=== Championship group ===
==== Table ====
Pos	Team	Pld	W	D	L	GF	GA	GD	Pts	Qualification
1	WIT Georgia (C)	10	6	2	2	10	3	+7	41 (Note: The championship was decided in a champions playoff)	Qualification for the Champions League first qualifying round
2	Sioni Bolnisi	10	6	3	1	14	5	+9	41	Banned from European competitions (Note: Sioni Bolnisi were banned by UEFA due to crowd violence in the champions playoff match and were replaced by 4th-placed FC Tbilisi.)
3	Dinamo Tbilisi	10	4	3	3	15	10	+5	40	Qualification for the UEFA Cup first qualifying round
4	FC Tbilisi	10	3	5	2	12	8	+4	32	Qualification for the UEFA Cup first qualifying round
5	Locomotive Tbilisi	10	1	5	4	6	11	−5	25	
6	Dila Gori	10	0	2	8	2	22	−20	19	Qualification for the Intertoto Cup first round

Source: rsssf.org
Rules for classification: 1st points; 2nd matches won; 3rd head-to-head
(C) Champions

==== Results ====
Home \ Away	DIL	DIN	LOC	SIO	TBI	WIT
Dila Gori		0–1	0–0	1–2	0–2	0–4
Dinamo Tbilisi	5–0		0–0	1–0	2–2	1–3
Locomotive Tbilisi	3–1	0–1		0–0	1–1	0–1
Sioni Bolnisi	2–0	3–2	1–1		1–1	1–0
FC Tbilisi	0–0	1–0	5–1	0–2		0–1
WIT Georgia	3–0	1–0	1–0	0–0	0–0	

Source: rsssf.org
Legend: Blue = home team win; Yellow = draw; Red = away team win.

=== Relegation group ===
==== Table ====
Pos	Team	Pld	W	D	L	GF	GA	GD	Pts	Qualification or relegation
7	Torpedo Kutaisi	10	5	2	3	19	12	+7	34	
8	Kolkheti-1913 Poti	10	6	3	1	14	6	+8	33	
9	Mtskheta-Urioni (R)	10	6	3	1	14	5	+9	31	Qualification to Relegation play-offs
10	Dinamo Batumi (O)	10	3	0	7	6	14	−8	25	Qualification to Relegation play-offs
11	Spartaki-Lazika Zugdidi (R)	10	5	1	4	18	11	+7	24	Relegation to Pirveli Liga
12	Mertskhali Ozurgeti (R)	10	0	1	9	4	27	−23	6	Relegation to Pirveli Liga

Source: rsssf.org
Rules for classification: 1st points; 2nd matches won; 3rd head-to-head
(O) Play-off winners; (R) Relegated

==== Results ====
Home \ Away	DBA	KOL	MRT	MTS	SPL	TKU
Dinamo Batumi		1–3	2–1	0–1	1–0	0–2
Kolkheti-1913 Poti	2–0		2–0	1–0	0–0	2–1
Mertskhali Ozurgeti	0–1	0–0		2–6	0–2	0–4
Mtskheta-Urioni	1–0	1–1	2–0		1–0	1–1
Spartaki-Lazika Zugdidi	2–1	0–1	7–1	0–1		3–2
Torpedo Kutaisi	2–0	3–2	1–0	0–0	3–4	

Source: rsssf.org
Legend: Blue = home team win; Yellow = draw; Red = away team win.

== Champions playoff ==
30 May 2004

Sioni Bolnisi	0 – 2	WIT Georgia
		Gotsiridze 30'; Gochashvili 77'

Boris Paichadze Stadium, Tbilisi
Attendance: 15,000
Referee: Alexander Krichashvili

== Relegation play-offs ==
29 May 2004

Mtskheta-Urioni	2 – 3	Gorda-2000 Rustavi

29 May 2004

Dinamo Batumi	1 – 0	Milani Tsnori

== Top goalscorers ==
Rank	Goalscorer	Team	Goals
1	(Georgia (country)) Suliko Davitashvili	Torpedo Kutaisi	20
2	(Georgia (country)) Revaz Gotsiridze	WIT Georgia	19
3	(Georgia (country)) Boris Goncharov	Sioni Bolnisi	17
4	(Georgia (country)) Lado Akhalaia	Dinamo Tbilisi	12
5	(Georgia (country)) Mikheil Kakaladze	Dinamo Batumi	9
5	(Georgia (country)) Aleksandr Kaidarashvili	Dila Gori	9
5	(Georgia (country)) Yuri Gabiskiria	Sioni Bolnisi	9

== See also ==
- 2003–04 Pirveli Liga
- 2003–04 Georgian Cup
