= 2001–02 Georgian Cup =

Tournament details
- Country: Georgia
- Teams: 41

Final positions
- Champions: Locomotive Tbilisi
- Runners-up: Torpedo Kutaisi

The 2001–02 Georgian Cup (also known as the David Kipiani Cup) was the fifty-eighth season overall and twelfth since independence of the Georgian annual football tournament.

== Round of 16 ==
The first legs were played on 31 October and the second legs were played on 14 and 21 November 2001.

Team 1	Agg.	Team 2	1st leg	2nd leg
Merani-91 Tbilisi	0–5	Torpedo Kutaisi	0–1	0–4
Kolkheti-1913 Poti	1–4	Dinamo Batumi	1–3	0–1
Dinamo Tbilisi	5–0	Sioni Bolnisi	2–0	3–0
Samgurali Tskaltubo	0–3	WIT Georgia	0–2	0–1
Locomotive Tbilisi	5–0	Dila Gori	3–0	2–0
Guria Lanchkhuti	1–0	Milani Tsnori	1–0	0–0
Gorda Rustavi	3–3 (a)	Kobuleti	2–0	1–3
TSU Tbilisi	4–2	Metalurgi Zestaponi	3–0	1–2

== Quarterfinals ==
The matches were played on 6 March (first legs) and 3 April 2002 (second legs).

Team 1	Agg.	Team 2	1st leg	2nd leg
TSU Tbilisi	0–6	Dinamo Tbilisi	0–1	0–5
WIT Georgia	5–0	Gorda Rustavi	1–0	4–0
Guria Lanchkhuti	0–4	Torpedo Kutaisi	0–2	0–2
Dinamo Batumi	2–4	Locomotive Tbilisi	1–2	1–2

== Semifinals ==
The matches were played on 23 April (first legs) and 4 May 2002 (second legs).

Team 1	Agg.	Team 2	1st leg	2nd leg
Locomotive Tbilisi	1–0	Dinamo Tbilisi	1–0	0–0
Torpedo Kutaisi	1–1 (3–4 p)	WIT Georgia	1–0	0–1 (a.e.t.)

== Final ==
26 May 2002

Locomotive Tbilisi	2–0	Torpedo Kutaisi
Davitashvili 33'; Janashia 60'

Boris Paichadze Stadium, Tbilisi
Attendance: 8,000
Referee: Kakhaber Meskhi (Zugdidi)

== See also ==
- 2001–02 Umaglesi Liga
- 2001–02 Pirveli Liga
