= Nerijus =

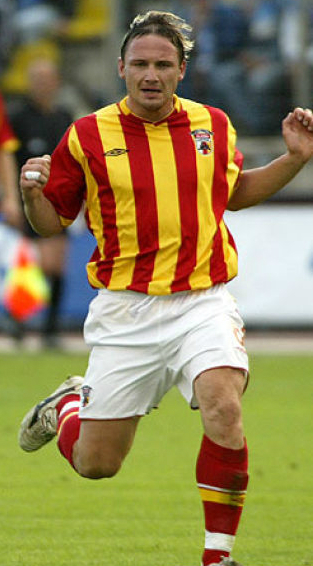
Nerijus Barasa in 2005

Nerijus is a Lithuanian masculine given name.

People named Nerijus include:

- Nerijus Astrauskas (born 1980), football striker who plays for FK Žalgiris Vilnius in the Lithuanian A Lyga
- Nerijus Barasa (born 1978), Lithuanian footballer, right-back or defensive
- Nerijus Numavičius (born 1967), Lithuanian businessman, chairman and president of VP Group
- Nerijus Radžius (born 1976), Lithuanian footballer, currently playing for Sūduva Marijampolė
- Nerijus Valskis (born 1987), Lithuanian footballer
- Nerijus Vasiliauskas (born 1977), Lithuanian footballer, who plays in Estonian Meistriliiga
