= FC Metalurgi Zestafoni =

Metalurgi Zestaponi
- Full name: FC Metalurgi Zestaponi
- Founded: 1999
- Dissolved: 2004
- Ground: Central stadium, Zestaponi
- League: N/A

FC Metalurgi Zestaponi (Georgian: საფეხბურთო კლუბი ზესტაფონის მეტალურგი) is a defunct Georgian association football club from Zestaponi. They spent five seasons in the first and second divisions of Georgian Football.

== History ==
Metalurgi were formed in the city of Zestaponi in 1999. Bearing the name of a Soviet-time club existing in the city for more than 60 years since 1937, they made a debut in the 2nd division the same year with both clubs of the city, Metalurgi and Margveti, drawn in Group A.

The team spent first two years in the 2nd division. In 2001, they finished the season as runners-up and secured automatic promotion to the top flight.

Following the first phase of the 2001–02 season, Metalurgi took part in relegation round. They managed to seal a place for next season, although a year later ended up rooted to the bottom being winless during the entire relegation campaign.

Their woes continued back in the second league. Severe financial shortages badly affected Metalurgi who remained rock bottom during the entire 2003–04 season. With just seven points from 30 games, the team dropped out of the Pirveli Liga and soon suspended their activities.

During this five-year period, Metalurgi played 152 league and cup games in total, including 64 matches in the top tier.

By 2004, Margveti, too, had already ceased to exist due to bankruptcy, but another local club, FC Zestaponi, was rising who would shortly make the city one of the centers of Georgian football for nearly a decade.

== Seasons ==
Season	League	Pos	MP	W	D	L	GF–GA	P
1999–2000	Pirveli Liga West A	4th of 12	22	12	5	5	42–27	41
2000–2001	Pirveli Liga regular season	2nd of 12	22	12	6	4	36–19	42
2000–2001	Promotion Group	↑2nd of 6	10	5	2	3	12–12	17
2001–2002	Umaglesi Liga regular season	9th of 12	22	4	8	10	17–34	20
2001–2002	Relegation Group	9th of 12	10	5	2	3	16–10	27
2002–2003	Umaglesi Liga regular season	10th of 12	22	6	1	15	17–50	19
2002–2003	Relegation Group	↓12th of 12	10	0	0	10	0–29	10
2003–2004	Pirveli Liga	↓16th of 16	30	2	1	27	18–87	7

== Notable players ==
Zviad Endeladze, the only Georgian player who has won the European Golden Shoe, was a member of Metalurgi during the team's two-year tenure in the Umaglesi Liga. He scored 17 goals in 32 matches for the club.

== Honours ==
Pirveli Liga

- Runners-up: 2000–01
