= 2003–04 Pirveli Liga =

2003–04 Pirveli Liga was the 15th season of the Georgian Pirveli Liga.

== League standings ==
Pos	Team	Pld	W	D	L	GF	GA	GD	Pts	Promotion, qualification or relegation
1	Shukura Kobuleti (C, R)	30	19	4	7	54	28	+26	61	Relegation to Meore Liga (Note: Shukura Kobuleti and Samgurali Tskaltubo were initially promoted, but later were withdrew from the league due to financial difficulties.)
2	Samgurali Tskaltubo (R)	30	17	7	6	39	19	+20	58	Relegation to Meore Liga
3	Milani Tsnori	30	15	7	8	38	26	+12	52	Qualification for Promotion play-offs
4	Gorda-2000 Rustavi	30	16	3	11	46	31	+15	51	Qualification for Promotion play-offs
5	Dinamo B Tbilisi	30	15	5	10	68	36	+32	50	
6	Chikhura Sachkhere	30	15	5	10	41	29	+12	50	
7	Olimpi Tbilisi	30	14	8	8	38	31	+7	50	Second team
8	TSU Tbilisi (R)	30	13	8	9	59	30	+29	47	Withdrew from the league?
9	Tskhinvali	30	13	7	10	45	25	+20	46	
10	Guria Lanchkhuti	30	13	6	11	38	37	+1	45	
11	WIT-Georgia Mtskheta	30	12	8	10	31	22	+9	44	
12	Ameri Tbilisi	30	12	7	11	34	24	+10	43	
13	Iveria Khashuri	30	11	6	13	29	42	−13	39	
14	Lokomotivi Samtredia (R)	30	6	1	23	21	77	−56	19	Relegation to Meore Liga
15	Luka Batumi (R)	30	5	1	24	29	84	−55	16	Relegation to Meore Liga
16	Metalurgi Zestaponi (P)	30	2	1	27	18	87	−69	7	Promotion to Umaglesi Liga (Note: Metalurgi Zestaponi were initially relegated, but after the merger with FC Zestaponi they were promoted to the Umaglesi Liga taking the place of Shukura and Samgurali.)

Source: rsssf.org
Rules for classification: 1) Points; 2) Number of wins; 3) Head-to-head record
(C) Champions; (P) Promoted; (R) Relegated

== See also ==
- 2003–04 Umaglesi Liga
- 2003–04 Georgian Cup
