= Giorgi Khidesheli =

Georgian footballer

Personal information
- Date of birth: 23 January 1988 (age 38)
- Height: 1.89 m (6 ft 2 1/2 in)
- Position: Defender

Senior career*
Years	Team	Apps	(Gls)
2004–2005	FC Tbilisi	2	(0)
2005–2006	Zestaponi	19	(1)
2006–2007	Kakheti Telavi	12	(0)
2007–2013	Zestaponi	114	(7)
2013–2014	Torpedo Kutaisi	15	(2)
2014	Dinamo Tbilisi	11	(0)
2014	Zestaponi	5	(0)
2015	Dila Gori	1	(0)
2015–2018	Locomotive Tbilisi	41	(4)
2018	Rustavi	0	(0)

International career
2005–2010	Georgia U21	26	(1)
2008–2013	Georgia	3	(0)

Managerial career
- 2026–: Locomotive Tbilisi
- * Club domestic league appearances and goals as of 14 April 2018

Giorgi Khidesheli (Georgian: გიორგი ხიდეშელი; born 23 January 1988) is a Georgian professional football manager and former player.
