= Shalva Apkhazava =

Georgian footballer

Shalva Abhazava
Personal information
- Full name: Shalva Abhazava
- Date of birth: 14 August 1980
- Place of birth: Kobuleti, Georgian SSR, Soviet Union
- Date of death: 7 January 2004 (aged 23)
- Place of death: Kyiv, Ukraine
- Height: 1.71 m (5 ft 7 in)
- Position: Striker

Senior career*
Years	Team	Apps	(Gls)
1995–1997	FC Kakhaberi Khelvachauri	6	(1)
1997–2002	FC Dinamo Batumi	128	(32)
2002–2004	FC Arsenal Kyiv	38	(17)

International career
2003	Georgia	1	(0)
- * Club domestic league appearances and goals

Shalva Apkhazava (Georgian: შალვა აფხაზავა; born 14 August 1980 – 7 January 2004) was a Georgian professional football striker who played for FC Arsenal Kyiv in Ukraine. He died in 2004, just 23 years old, from heart disease.
