= Ferhat Bıkmaz =

Turkish footballer

Personal information
- Date of birth: 6 July 1988 (age 38)
- Place of birth: Hanover, West Germany
- Height: 1.79 m (5 ft 10 in)
- Positions: Left-back; midfielder

Team information
- Current team: OSV Hannover

Youth career
- –2002: TuS Marathon Hannover
- 2002–2006: Hannover 96

Senior career*
Years	Team	Apps	(Gls)
2006–2009	Hannover 96 II	75	(9)
2007–2008	Hannover 96	1	(0)
2009–2012	Sivasspor	13	(0)
2012	Akhisar Belediyespor		
2012–2013	1. FC Wünstorf		
2013	VfB Oldenburg	3	(0)
2013–2014	TSV Havelse	25	(4)
2014–2017	OSV Hannover		
2017–2020	HSC Hannover		
2020–2022	TSV Godshorn		
2022–	OSV Hannover		

International career
2004	Turkey U16		
2004–2005	Turkey U17		
2005–2006	Turkey U18		
2006–2007	Turkey U19		
2008	Turkey U20		
2006–2009	Turkey U21	6	(1)
- * Club domestic league appearances and goals as of 09:49, 24 May 2019 (UTC)

Ferhat Bıkmaz (born 6 July 1988) is a Turkish footballer who plays as a midfielder for OSV Hannover.
