= Nukri Manchkhava =

Georgian footballer

Personal information
- Full name: Nukri Manchkhava
- Date of birth: 5 January 1982 (age 44)
- Place of birth: Tbilisi, Georgian SSR
- Height: 1.78 m (5 ft 10 in)
- Position: Defender

Senior career*
Years	Team	Apps	(Gls)
1999–2000	Guria Lanchkhuti	4	(0)
2000–2001	Olimpi Tbilisi	12	(0)
2001–2002	Lokomotivi Tbilisi	7	(0)
2002–2003	FC Dinamo-2 Tbilisi	19	(2)
2003–2004	Dinamo Batumi	46	(0)
2005	Lokomotivi Tbilisi	17	(0)
2005–2008	FBK Kaunas	65	(1)
2009	Torpedo Zhodino	19	(0)
2011	Spartaki Tskhinvali	9	(0)
2011	Torpedo Kutaisi	1	(0)
- * Club domestic league appearances and goals

Nukri Manchkhava (Georgian: ნუკრი მანჩხავა; born 5 January 1982) is a retired Georgian footballer.
