= Mikheil Bobokhidze =

Georgian professional football player

Personal information
- Date of birth: 23 November 1981 (age 44)
- Height: 1.82 m (5 ft 11 1/2 in)
- Position: Striker

Team information
- Current team: FC Sioni Bolnisi

Senior career*
Years	Team	Apps	(Gls)
1996–1997	35-STU Tbilisi	7	(0)
1997–1998	FC Dinamo-2 Tbilisi	15	(6)
1998–1999	FC Kakheti Telavi	13	(8)
1999–2001	FC Torpedo Kutaisi	29	(7)
2001–2004	FC Dinamo Tbilisi	47	(22)
2004–2005	FC Lokomotivi Tbilisi	29	(12)
2005–2007	FC Dinamo Tbilisi	37	(16)
2007–2008	FC Lokomotivi Tbilisi	5	(0)
2008–2011	FC Sioni Bolnisi		

International career
2005	Georgia	1	(0)
- * Club domestic league appearances and goals

Mikheil Bobokhidze (Georgian: მიხეილ ბობოხიძე; born 23 November 1981) is a Georgian professional football player. Currently, he plays for FC Sioni Bolnisi.
