= Nerijus Astrauskas =

Lithuanian footballer (born 1980)

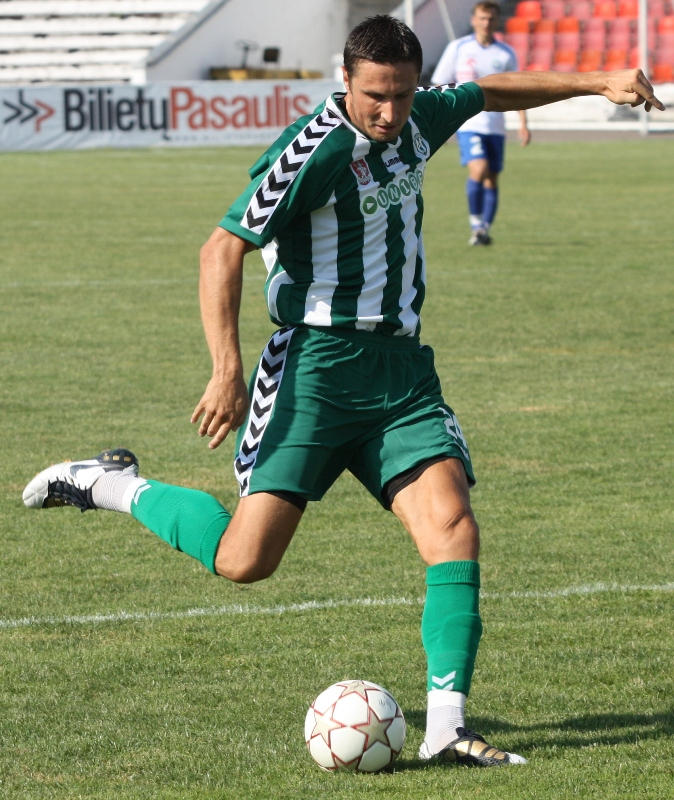
- Astrauskas with Žalgiris Vilnius

Personal information
- Date of birth: 18 October 1980 (age 46)
- Place of birth: Šiauliai, Lithuanian SSR, Soviet Union
- Height: 1.90 m (6 ft 3 in)
- Position: Forward

Senior career*
Years	Team	Apps	(Gls)
2002	Sakalas Šiauliai	14	(3)
2003	Sviesa Vilnius	26	(4)
2003–2004	RKS Radomsko	0	(0)
2004–2005	FK Vilnius	57	(6)
2006	Liepājas Metalurgs	12	(3)
2007	Interas Visaginas	7	(3)
2007	FK Vilnius	3	(0)
2007–2008	Ayia Napa	12	(6)
2008–2009	Niki Volos	21	(3)
2009–2010	Veria	30	(5)
2010–2012	Žalgiris Vilnius	41	(12)
2012–2013	Rabat Ajax	9	(2)
2013	Kruoja Pakruojis	30	(1)
2014	Trakai	13	(1)
2014–2015	Inter Leipzig	30	(4)
2015	MRU Vilnius	12	(2)
2016–2018	Kastoria		

International career
2005	Lithuania	2	(0)
- * Club domestic league appearances and goals

Nerijus Astrauskas (born 18 October 1980) is a Lithuanian former professional footballer who played as a forward.

== Honours ==
Lithuania

- Baltic Cup: 2005
