= Andriy Poroshyn =

Ukrainian footballer

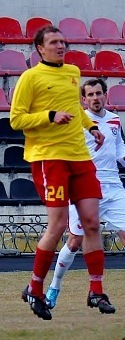

Personal information
- Full name: Andriy Mykhailovych Poroshyn
- Date of birth: 30 September 1978 (age 48)
- Place of birth: Kirovohrad, Ukraine
- Height: 1.85 m (6 ft 1 in)
- Position: Forward

Youth career
- FC Zirka Kirovohrad

Senior career*
Years	Team	Apps	(Gls)
1995–1996	FC Burevisnyk-Elbrus Kirovohrad		
1997–1998	Zirka Kirovohrad	38	(2)
1997–1998	→ Zirka-2 Kirovohrad	24	(4)
1999–2000	Sheriff Tiraspol	34	(10)
2001–2003	Torpedo Kutaisi	66	(27)
2004	Lokomotiv Moscow	0	(0)
2004–2006	Spartak Nalchik	102	(27)
2007	Shinnik Yaroslavl	26	(7)
2008	SKA Rostov-on-Don	8	(0)
2008–2009	Salyut-Energia Belgorod	53	(11)
2010	Daugava	8	(3)
2010–2014	Zirka Kirovohrad	75	(8)
Total		434	(99)
- * Club domestic league appearances and goals

Andriy Mykhailovych Poroshyn (Ukrainian: Андрій Михайлович Порошин; born 30 September 1978) is a Ukrainian former professional footballer. In April 2010, he joined FC Daugava from the Virsliga but left it in August the same year.
