= FC Mtskheta (2001–2004) =

Mtskheta
- Full name: Football Club Mtskheta
- Founded: 2001
- Dissolved: 2004
- Ground: Armazi Stadium, Mtskheta, Georgia
- Capacity: 2,000
- Chairman: Vladimir Gutsaev
- Manager: Vladimir Gutsaev
- 2003–04: Umaglesi Liga, 9th
Home colours

FC Mtskheta, renamed to Mtskheta-Urioni in the 2003–04 season, was a Georgian association football club based in Mtskheta.

The club played its matches at Armazi Stadium, currently called Mtskheta Park.

== History ==
In the 2001–02 season the club participated in Regionuli Liga (eastern zone), where they took first place.

In 2002–03 Mtskheta played in Pirveli Liga, where they finished third and qualified for a play-off game. After a 1:0 extra-time win against Gorda Rustavi they secured promotion to Umaglesi Liga. The next season the club took the 9th place in the league and was relegated after losing a play-off match, in which Gorda Rustavi took revenge for the previous year's loss. Following this season the club ceased to exist.

In the Georgian Cup Mtskheta played 6 matches - 2 wins, 1 draw, 3 losses.

- 2001: Founded as SC Mtskheta
- 2004: Renamed to "Mtskheta-Urioni"
- 2004: Dissolved.

=== Seasons ===
First team

Season	League	Pos.	Pl.	W	D	L	GF	GA	P	Cup	Notes
2001–02	Regionuli Liga East	1	36	26	7	3	77	17	85		Mtskheta
2002–03	Pirveli Liga	3	30	17	7	6	50	23	58	Round of 32	Mtskheta
2003–04	Umaglesi Liga	9	32	12	5	15	39	60	31	Round of 16	Mtskheta-Urioni

Second team

Season	League	Pos.	Pl.	W	D	L	GF	GA	P	Cup	Notes
2002–03	Regionuli Liga East	8	26	11	4	11	38	44	37		Mtskheta 2
2003–04	Regionuli Liga East	6	24	10	5	9	41	32	35		Mtskheta-Urioni 2
