= Zviad Endeladze =

Georgian footballer

- Zviad Endeladze

Personal information
- Full name: Zviad Endeladze
- Date of birth: 7 April 1966 (age 60)
- Place of birth: Adigeni, Soviet Union
- Height: 1.77 m (5 ft 10 in)
- Position: Forward

Senior career*
Years	Team	Apps	(Gls)
1988–1989	Metalurgi Rustavi	34	(10)
1990–1991	Sairme	44	(37)
1991–1992	Samtredia	36	(18)
1992–1996	Margveti	90	(62)
1996–1997	Luch	30	(6)
1997–1999	Odishi	36	(12)
1999–2000	Margveti	27	(11)
2000–2001	Guria	30	(9)
2001–2002	Metalurgi Zestaponi	32	(17)
2002–2008	Guria	130	(39)
2009–2010	Chkherimela	2	(0)
Total		491	(221)
- * Club domestic league appearances and goals

Zviad Endeladze (Georgian: ზვიად ენდელაძე; born 7 April 1966 in Adigeni) is a retired Georgian footballer who played as a forward.

Endeladze started his career at local Adigeni club Zarzma. After a year-long conscription to the Soviet military, he resumed playing football.

Endeladze has played for clubs such as Guria and Margveti, scoring 40 goals in 30 league games during the 1995–96 season, which made him the top scorer in European domestic competitions and would have won the European Golden Boot had it not been suspended in 1991. The award was reinstated a season after Endeladze's feat under new rules that would count goals scored in the Georgian Top League as one point while goals scored in Europe's top leagues are counted double.

He retired from football in 2010 aged 44, but remained in football working as a coach for youth teams in Kutaisi.
