= FC Tbilisi =

- Full name: Football Club Tbilisi
- Founded: 1991
- Dissolved: 2009
- Ground: Olimpi Stadium; Tbilisi, Georgia
- Capacity: 3,000
- League: Pirveli Liga East
- 2007–08: 6th
Home colours	Away colours

FC Tbilisi was a Georgian football team based in the capital Tbilisi. The club played their home games at Olimpi Stadium. FC Tbilisi were renamed Olimpi Rustavi after merging with second division club Rustavi.

In the summer of 2008, the two clubs split up again. Tbilisi took the spot from Olimpi B Rustavi and continued to play in Pirveli Liga.

== History ==
Founded as FC Olimpi Tbilisi

- 2003: Merged with Merani-91 Tbilisi, as Merani-Olimpi Tbilisi
- 2003: Renamed as FC Tbilisi
- 2006: Merged with Rustavi, Renamed as Olimpi Rustavi.
- 2008: Split up.
- 2009: Dissolved.

=== Seasons ===
==== First Team ====
- 2002–03: Olimpi Tbilisi Regionuli Liga
- 2003–04: FC Tbilisi Umaglesi Liga
- 2004–05: FC Tbilisi Umaglesi Liga
- 2005–06: FC Tbilisi Umaglesi Liga
- 2006–08: part of Olimpi Rustavi
- 2008–09: FC Tbilisi Pirveli Liga

Season	League	Pos.	Pl.	W	D	L	GF	GA	P	Cup	Europe	Notes
2003/04	Umaglesi Liga 1st stage	4	22	10	5	7	41	26	35	Quarter-finals		FC Tbilisi
2003/04	Champ.Group	4	10	3	5	2	12	8	32	Quarter-finals		FC Tbilisi
2004/05	Umaglesi Liga	3	36	21	6	9	60	40	69	Semi-finals	UC 2nd qualifying round	FC Tbilisi

==== Second Team ====
- 2003–04: Olimpi Tbilisi Pirveli Liga
- 2004–05: Olimpi Tbilisi Pirveli Liga
- 2005–06: FC Tbilisi B Pirveli Liga
- 2006–07: Olimpi Tbilisi Pirveli Liga
- 2007–08: Olimpi B Rustavi Pirveli Liga

==== Third Team ====
- 2004–05: FC Tbilisi C Regionuli Liga
- 2006–07: FC Tbilisi Regionuli Liga

== Eurocups record ==
Season	Competition	Round	Club	Home	Away	Overall
2004–05	UEFA Cup	1R	(Azerbaijan) FC Shamkir	1–0	4–1	5–1
2004–05	UEFA Cup	2R	(Poland) Legia Warszawa	0–1	0–6	0–7

== Notable players ==
- (Georgia (country)) Akaki Devadze (2004–05)
- (Georgia (country)) Zaal Eliava
- (Georgia (country)) Soso Grishikashvili (2004)
- (Georgia (country)) Gogita Gogua (2003–05)
- (Georgia (country)) Sandro Iashvili (2004–05)
- (Georgia (country)) Lasha Jakobia (2003)
- (Georgia (country)) Revaz Kemoklidze
- (Georgia (country)) Gocha Khojava
- (Georgia (country)) Givi Kvaratskhelia

== Honours ==
- Umaglesi Liga

Third place (1): 2004-05
