= FC Spartaki Tbilisi =

Spartaki Tbilisi
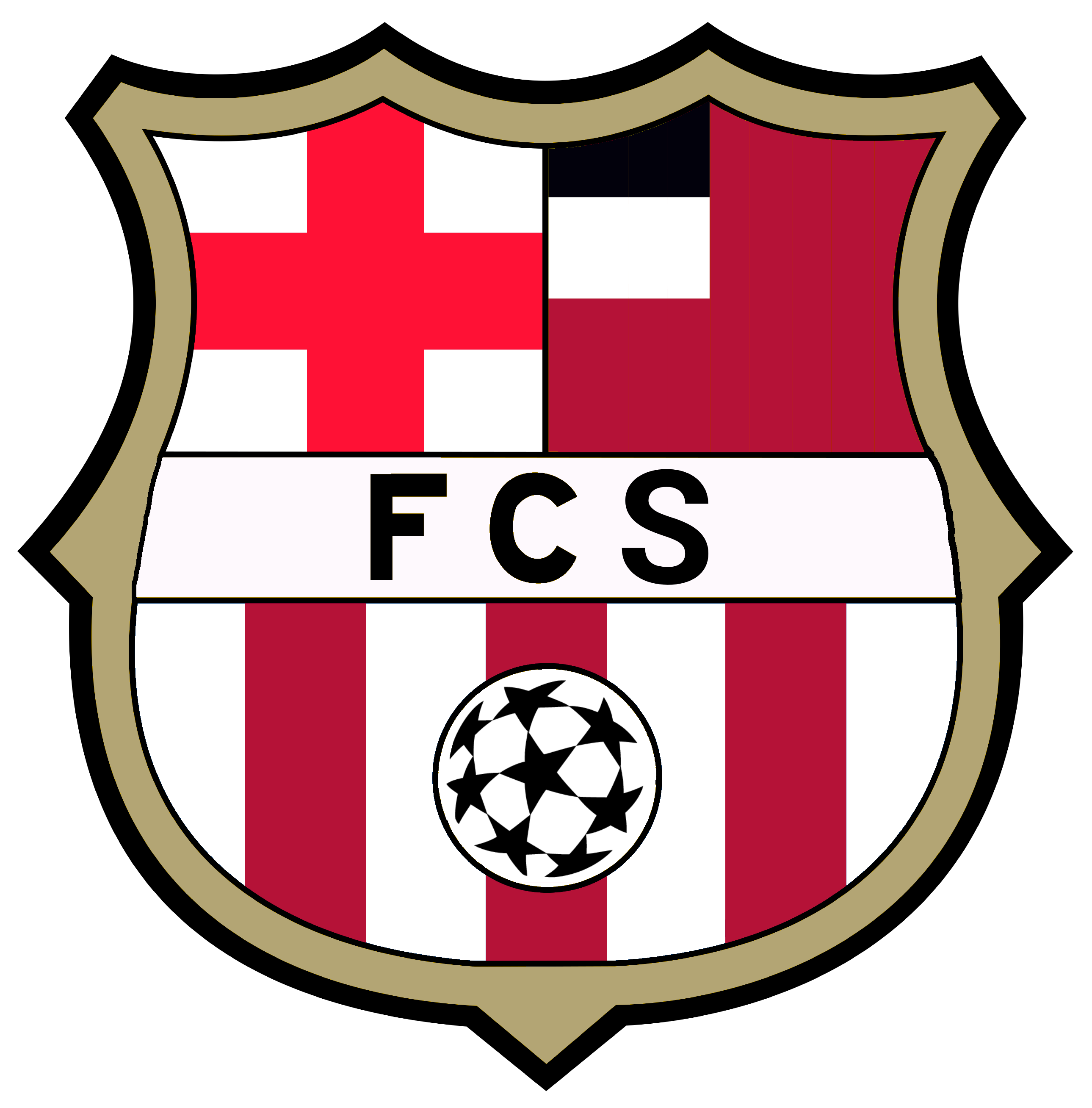
- Full name: Football Club Spartaki Tbilisi
- Founded: 1946, 2002
- Dissolved: 2008
- Ground: Shevardeni Stadium; Tbilisi, Georgia
- Capacity: 4,000

FC Spartaki Tbilisi is a defunct Georgian football club based in Tbilisi. Before their dissolution they played in Meore Liga's Centre Zone and held home games at Shevardeni Stadium.

== Previous names ==
- 1946—1947: Krylya Sovetov Tbilisi
- 1948—198?: Spartak Tbilisi
- 2002—2003: Spartaki Tbilisi
- 2003—2004: Spartaki-Lazika Zugdidi
- 2004—2008: Spartaki Tbilisi

== Notable players ==
- Teymuraz Mchedlishvili
