= FC Milani Tsnori =

Milani Tsnori
- Full name: Football Club Milani Tsnori
- Founded: 1998
- Dissolved: 2000
- Ground: Davit Kipiani Stadium, Tsnori
- Capacity: 9,500

FC Milani Tsnori was a Georgian association football club based in Tsnori. Founded in 1998, they were played in Umaglesi Liga in the 2002–03 season, but were relegated after was finished at the 11th position. In 2004, the club was merged with Merani Tbilisi and then the club ceased to exist.
