= FC Locomotive Tbilisi =

Association football club in Georgia

Locomotive Tbilisi
- Full name: Football Club Locomotive Tbilisi
- Nickname: Railroaders
- Short name: Loco
- Founded: August 14, 1936; 90 years ago
- Ground: Mikheil Meskhi Stadium; Mikheil Meskhi 2 Stadium; Tbilisi, Georgia
- Capacity: 24,680; 2,500
- President: Alex Topuria
- Head coach: Giorgi Khidesheli
- League: Liga 3
- 2025: Erovnuli Liga 2, 7th of 10 (relegated)
- Website: fcloco.ge
Home colours	Away colours	Third colours

FC Locomotive Tbilisi, commonly referred to as Lokomotivi or simply Loco, is a Georgian professional football club based in Tbilisi. The club competes in the Liga 3, the third tier of Georgian football.

During the existence of the USSR the club was a part of the Lokomotiv Voluntary Sports Society. The club has strong connections with the Georgian Railways.

== History ==
Locomotive was founded on 14 August 1936 as a part of Lokomotiv sports society. The club won Georgian championship in 1937, which gave them the permission to participate in USSR Top League. Their debut season in the highest level of the Soviet football championship came in 1938, where the club took 24th place out of 26 and got relegated. However, the Tbilisi-based club managed to get another promotion during the following season and participated in 1940 Soviet Top League. But they were eventually disqualified from the tournament. These were the only seasons when Locomotive managed to take part in the top league.

From the following years until the dissolution of USSR, the club moved between the lower divisions, played in the second the third divisions of the Soviet football championship.

Nodar Akhalkatsi, the coach of FC Dinamo Tbilisi and one of the most successful managers in Soviet football, started his managing career in Locomotive. He managed the club from 1967 to 1970.

Since the post-Soviet era, Locomotive is one of the regular members of Erovnuli Liga. However, the club failed to win the championship. They were runners-up twice: in 2000-01 and in 2001–02 Umaglesi Liga. The club won Georgian Cup three times: in 2000, in 2002 and in 2005.

Some notable players of the club are: Levan Kenia, Levan Tskitishvili, Zurab Khizanishvili, Giorgi Arabidze, Giorgi Aburjania, Valeri Abramidze, Juan Diego González-Vigil, Giorgi Mamardashvili and Endika Bordas.

== Honours ==
- Erovnuli Liga
  - Winners (3): 1937, 1945, 1956
  - Runners-up (3): 1943, 2000-01, 2001-02
- Georgian Cup
  - Winners (3): 1999–2000, 2001–02, 2004–05
  - Runners-up (2): 2000-01, 2019
- Georgian Super Cup
  - Runners-up (1): 2005

== European cups ==
Season	Competition	Round	Country	Club	Home	Away
1999–00	UEFA Cup	QR	(Northern Ireland)	Linfield	1–0	1–1
1999–00	UEFA Cup	1R	(Greece)	PAOK	0–7	0–2
2000–01	UEFA Cup	QR	(Slovakia)	Slovan	0–2	0–2
2001–02	UEFA Cup	QR	(Malta)	Birkirkara	1–1	0–0
2002–03	UEFA Cup	QR	(Denmark)	Copenhagen	1–4	1–3
2005–06	UEFA Cup	1R	(Armenia)	Banants	0–2	3–2
2008	UEFA Intertoto Cup	1Q	(Luxembourg)	Etzella	2–2	0–0
2020–21	UEFA Europa League	1Q	(Romania)	Universitatea Craiova	2–1	—N/a
2020–21	UEFA Europa League	2Q	(Russia)	Dynamo Moscow	2–1	—N/a
2020–21	UEFA Europa League	3Q	(Spain)	Granada	—N/a	0–2

== Players ==
=== Current squad ===
As of 28 May 2026. Note: Flags indicate national team as defined under FIFA eligibility rules; some limited exceptions apply. Players may hold more than one non-FIFA nationality.

No.	Pos.	Nation	Player
1	GK	GEO	Luka Khelashvili
2	MF	GEO	Vasiko Chighladze
7	MF	GEO	Andria Vibliani
9	MF	GEO	Giorgi Todua
10	MF	ZAM	Frank Chileshe
11	MF	GEO	Luka Khokhashvili
12	GK	GEO	Gigi Tsiklauri
13	DF	GEO	Nika Uzoevi
14	MF	GEO	Demetre Gochava
15	DF	GEO	Nikoloz Gozalishvili
16	DF	GEO	Sandro Shashiashvili (captain)
17	MF	GEO	Nikoloz Tsereteli
18	MF	GEO	Luka Jojua
19	MF	GEO	Nikoloz Tsartsidze
20	FW	GEO	Lasha Ozbetelashvili
21	DF	GEO	Saba Khachidze
22	MF	GEO	Mamuka Chkhartishvili

No.	Pos.	Nation	Player
23	FW	GEO	Giorgi Mzhavanadze
24	MF	GEO	Saba Kakulia
30	MF	GEO	Nika Bzhalava
31	MF	GEO	Konstantine Sanaia
32	DF	GEO	Giorgi Gogatishvili
34	DF	GEO	Dachi Gogoli
35	DF	GEO	Saba Gulua
36	FW	ZAM	Bonephaneso Phiri
37	MF	GEO	Davit Zakareishvili
—	MF	GEO	Temuri Shonia
—	GK	GEO	Luka Sherozia
—	MF	GEO	Davit Samurkasovi
—	MF	GEO	Avtandil Mashava
—	FW	GEO	Zviad Kantaria
—	DF	GEO	Mikheil Sajaia
—	DF	GEO	Nikoloz Jobava

== Reserve team ==
Lokomotive II — participant in a number of seasons in the second and third most important leagues in Georgia. Reached the final of the 2022 Georgian Cup as a fourth league team.

== Personnel ==
=== Current technical staff ===
Position	Staff
Head coach	(Georgia (country)) Giorgi Khidesheli
Assistant coaches	(Georgia (country)) Giorgi Kakhelishvili
Assistant coaches	(Georgia (country)) Lasha Simonia
Fitness coach	(Georgia (country)) Demi Gogiashvili

- Last updated: 28 May 2026

=== Management ===
Position	Staff
President	Alex Topuria
General Director	Davit Kipiani
Director and Chief security officer	Erekle Chotalishvili
Academy Director	Alexander Goshadze
Sport Director	Tamaz Bokeria
Financial Manager	Gia Rapava
Financial Consultant	Maia Sarajishvili
Lawyer, licensing and Transfers Manager	Nino Kutateladze
Media Manager	Tamar Gogoladze
Financie Specialist	Lia Mandzulashvili

- Last updated: 28 May 2026
