= 2015–16 in Georgian football =

Football in Georgia (country)
- Season: 2015–16

Men's football
- Umaglesi Liga: FC Dinamo Tbilisi
- Pirveli Liga: Liakhvi Tskhinvali
- Liga 3: Sulori Vani
- Georgian Cup: FC Dinamo Tbilisi

A summary of the 2015–16 in Georgian football season of top tier football in Georgia, from August 2015 to May 2016.

== National teams results ==
=== 2015 ===
25 March Friendly	Georgia	2–0	Malta	Tbilisi, Georgia
	Kankava 83'; Qazaishvili 90+1'	Report		Stadium: Mikheil Meskhi Stadium; Attendance: 16,000; Referee: Aleksandrs Anufrijevs (Latvia)

29 March UEFA Euro 2016 qualifying	Georgia	0–2	Germany	Tbilisi, Georgia
		Report	Reus 39'; Müller 44'	Stadium: Boris Paichadze Dinamo Arena; Attendance: 51,000; Referee: Clément Turpin (France)

9 June Friendly	Georgia	1–2	Ukraine	Linz, Austria
	Vatsadze 81'	Report	Kravets 57'; Konoplyanka 67'	Stadium: Stadion auf der Gugl; Attendance: 700; Referee: Markus Hameter (Austria)

13 June UEFA Euro 2016 qualifying	Poland	4–0	Georgia	Warsaw, Poland
	Milik 62'; Lewandowski 89', 90+2', 90+3'	Report		Stadium: Stadion Narodowy; Attendance: 56,512; Referee: Aleksei Kulbakov (Belarus)

4 September UEFA Euro 2016 qualifying	Georgia	1–0	Scotland	Tbilisi, Georgia
	Kazaishvili 38'	Report		Stadium: Boris Paichadze Dinamo Arena; Attendance: 23,000; Referee: Ovidiu Haţegan (Romania)

7 September UEFA Euro 2016 qualifying	Republic of Ireland	1–0	Georgia	Dublin, Republic of Ireland
	Walters 69'	Report		Stadium: Aviva Stadium; Attendance: 27,200; Referee: István Vad (Hungary)

8 October UEFA Euro 2016 qualifying	Georgia	4–0	Gibraltar	Tbilisi, Georgia
	Vatsadze 30', 45'; Okriashvili 35' (pen.); Kazaishvili 87'	Report		Stadium: Boris Paichadze Dinamo Arena; Attendance: 11,330; Referee: Serhiy Boyko (Ukraine)

11 October UEFA Euro 2016 qualifying	Germany	2–1	Georgia	Leipzig, Germany
	Müller 50' (pen.); Kruse 79'	Report	Kankava 53'	Stadium: Red Bull Arena; Attendance: 43,630; Referee: Pavel Královec (Czech Republic)

11 November Friendly	Estonia	3–0	Georgia	Tallinn, Estonia
	Purje 61'; Pikk 65'; Gussev 88'	Report		Stadium: A. Le Coq Arena; Attendance: 2,266; Referee: Raymond Crangle (Northern Ireland)

16 November Friendly	Albania	2–2	Georgia	Tirana, Albania
	Basha 89'; Cikalleshi 90+4'	Report	Amisulashvili 2'; Chanturia 53'	Stadium: Qemal Stafa Stadium; Attendance: 2,000; Referee: Davide Massa (Italy)

=== 2016 ===
29 March Friendly	Georgia	1–1	Kazakhstan	Tbilisi, Georgia
	Okriashvili 38'	Report	Nurgaliev 35'	Stadium: Boris Paichadze Dinamo Arena; Attendance: 15,000; Referee: Clayton Pisani (Malta)

27 May Friendly	Slovakia	3–1	Georgia	Wels, Austria
	Nemec 5', 56'; Zreľák 70'	Report	Kenia 71'	Stadium: Renner Arena; Attendance: 782; Referee: Oliver Drachta (Austria)

3 June Friendly	Romania	5–1	Georgia	Bucharest, Romania
	Popa 2'; Amisulashvili 3' (o.g.); Stanciu 49'; Torje 80'; Keșerü 87'	Report	Moți 68' (o.g.)	Stadium: Arena Națională; Attendance: 27,934; Referee: Artur Ribeiro (Portugal)

7 June Friendly	Spain	0–1	Georgia	Getafe, Spain
		Report	Okriashvili 40'	Stadium: Coliseum Alfonso Pérez; Attendance: 14,650; Referee: Vilhjálmur Alvar Þórarinsson (Iceland)

5 September 2018 FIFA World Cup qualification	Georgia	1–2	Austria	Tbilisi, Georgia
	Ananidze 78'	Report	Hinteregger 16'; Janko 42'	Stadium: Boris Paichadze Dinamo Arena; Attendance: 25,000; Referee: Aleksei Kulbakov (Belarus)

6 October 2018 FIFA World Cup qualification	Republic of Ireland	1–0	Georgia	Dublin, Republic of Ireland
	Coleman 56'	Report		Stadium: Aviva Stadium; Attendance: 39,793; Referee: Tony Chapron (France)

9 October 2018 FIFA World Cup qualification	Wales	1–1	Georgia	Cardiff, Wales
	Bale 10'	Report	Okriashvili 57'	Stadium: Cardiff City Stadium; Attendance: 32,652; Referee: Paolo Mazzoleni (Italy)

12 November 2018 FIFA World Cup qualification	Georgia	1–1	Moldova	Tbilisi, Georgia
	Qazaishvili 16'	Report	Gațcan 78'	Stadium: Boris Paichadze Dinamo Arena; Attendance: 40,642; Referee: Georgi Kabakov (Bulgaria)

== League tables ==
=== Umaglesi Liga ===
Pos	Team	Pld	W	D	L	GF	GA	GD	Pts	Qualification or relegation
1	Dinamo Tbilisi (C)	30	25	1	4	74	29	+45	76	Qualification for the Champions League second qualifying round (Note: Dinamo Tbilisi qualified for the Europa League first qualifying round by winning the 2015–16 Georgian Cup. However, since they already qualified for European competition based on their league position, the spot awarded to the cup winners was passed down the league.)
2	Samtredia	30	20	3	7	66	32	+34	63	Qualification for the Europa League first qualifying round
3	Dila Gori	30	19	5	6	51	25	+26	62	Qualification for the Europa League first qualifying round
4	Chikhura Sachkhere	30	17	6	7	53	26	+27	57	Qualification for the Europa League first qualifying round
5	Sioni Bolnisi	30	14	8	8	50	34	+16	50	
6	Torpedo Kutaisi	30	14	6	10	50	42	+8	48	
7	FC Tskhinvali	30	12	10	8	51	36	+15	46	
8	Dinamo Batumi	30	12	8	10	41	32	+9	44	
9	Saburtalo Tbilisi	30	11	6	13	47	61	−14	39	
10	Shukura Kobuleti	30	9	8	13	28	39	−11	35	
11	Guria Lanchkhuti	30	6	9	15	28	49	−21	27 (Note: Head-to-head record: Guria–Kolkheti Poti 1–1, Kolkheti Poti–Guria 0–1.)	
12	Kolkheti Poti	30	7	6	17	21	41	−20	27	
13	Locomotive Tbilisi	30	5	10	15	26	37	−11	25	
14	Zugdidi (O)	30	5	8	17	30	60	−30	23 (Note: Head-to-head record: Zugdidi–Merani Martvili 3–0, Merani Martvili–Zugdidi 0–0.)	Qualification to Relegation play-offs
15	Merani Martvili (R)	30	5	8	17	28	62	−34	23	Relegation to Pirveli Liga
16	Sapovnela Terjola (R)	30	5	6	19	24	63	−39	21	Relegation to Pirveli Liga

Source: UEFA, Soccerway
Rules for classification: 1) Points; 2) Head-to-head points; 3) Head-to-head goal difference; 4) Head-to-head goals scored; 5) Head-to-head away goals scored (only if two teams); 6) Goal difference; 7) Goals scored.
(C) Champions; (O) Play-off winners; (R) Relegated
Notes:

Results:

Home \ Away	CHI	DIL	DBA	DIN	GUR	KOL	LOC	MER	SAB	SAM	SAP	SHU	SIO	TKU	TSK	ZUG
Chikhura Sachkhere		0–1	2–0	1–0	5–0	0–1	1–0	3–0	5–0	1–1	3–2	1–0	1–1	3–0	2–1	4–0
Dila Gori	1–1		1–1	2–0	5–0	2–0	1–0	2–0	2–1	1–2	3–1	1–3	2–1	0–1	3–0	3–0
Dinamo Batumi	1–1	2–2		1–2	1–2	2–0	1–0	0–0	2–1	2–0	1–0	2–2	3–5	1–1	2–0	5–0
Dinamo Tbilisi	2–0	0–1	1–0		3–2	5–2	2–1	2–0	4–0	3–1	4–0	1–0	5–2	2–1	2–1	3–1
Guria Lanchkhuti	1–3	0–1	1–1	0–2		1–1	0–0	0–0	0–0	0–2	3–0	0–0	1–1	3–2	1–2	2–0
Kolkheti Poti	2–0	0–1	0–1	1–3	0–1		4–0	2–1	1–0	0–3	0–0	1–0	0–1	2–0	0–0	0–0
Locomotive Tbilisi	2–2	0–2	1–1	1–4	3–0	1–0		1–1	3–2	0–1	0–0	0–0	0–0	1–2	0–1	3–0
Merani Martvili	3–2	3–2	0–4	1–4	2–0	1–1	0–3		2–5	2–3	2–0	1–2	1–1	2–1	2–3	0–0
Saburtalo Tbilisi	1–0	1–3	1–2	0–4	4–2	5–0	0–0	4–2		3–2	2–1	3–2	2–3	4–4	2–2	1–0
Samtredia	0–1	5–0	2–0	2–1	3–1	1–0	3–2	4–0	8–2		3–0	2–0	1–2	3–1	2–1	2–0
Sapovnela Terjola	0–2	1–5	2–1	1–2	0–2	0–0	2–1	2–1	0–0	2–3		2–0	0–0	1–5	2–1	2–2
Shukura Kobuleti	0–2	1–0	0–1	1–3	2–1	1–0	2–1	0–0	1–0	1–1	4–0		0–0	2–3	2–2	2–1
Sioni	4–0	0–1	1–0	1–2	1–1	3–1	1–0	3–0	0–0	0–2	4–1	2–0		6–2	1–3	3–1
Torpedo Kutaisi	0–2	0–2	1–0	1–1	2–1	1–0	2–0	4–0	5–0	2–1	4–1	0–0	1–0		1–3	2–0
Tskhinvali	1–1	0–0	3–2	2–4	0–0	5–1	1–1	1–1	1–2	1–0	3–0	5–0	2–0	0–0		5–1
Zugdidi	1–4	1–1	0–1	2–3	3–2	2–1	1–1	3–0	0–1	3–3	2–1	3–0	1–3	1–1	1–1	

Source: Soccerway
Legend: Blue = home team win; Yellow = draw; Red = away team win.

=== Pirveli Liga ===
Pos	Team	Pld	W	D	L	GF	GA	GD	Pts	Relegation
1	Liakhvi Tskhinvali (C)	34	20	9	5	82	36	+46	69	
2	WIT Georgia	34	18	10	6	61	26	+35	64	
3	Kolkheti Khobi	34	18	10	6	60	29	+31	64	
4	Borjomi	34	17	10	7	45	32	+13	61	
5	Gagra	34	16	4	14	54	38	+16	52	
6	Samgurali Tskaltubo	34	16	3	15	60	46	+14	51	
7	Odishi 1919 Zugdidi	34	14	6	14	52	58	−6	48	
8	Chkherimela Kharagauli	34	12	7	15	39	50	−11	43	
9	Rustavi	34	10	13	11	33	33	0	43	
10	Skuri Tsalenjikha	34	11	10	13	32	33	−1	43	
11	Meshakhte Tkibuli	34	10	12	12	28	31	−3	42	
12	Chiatura	34	9	15	10	41	48	−7	42	
13	Imereti Khoni	34	10	11	13	34	53	−19	41	
14	Betlemi Keda (R)	34	12	4	18	41	65	−24	40	Relegation to Meore Liga
15	Samegrelo Chkhorotsku (R)	34	10	8	16	32	50	−18	38	Relegation to Meore Liga
16	Matchakhela Khelvachauri (R)	34	8	13	13	30	43	−13	37	Relegation to Meore Liga
17	Algeti Marneuli (R)	34	9	7	18	34	52	−18	34	Relegation to Meore Liga
18	Mertskhali Ozurgeti (R)	34	6	8	20	42	77	−35	26	Relegation to Meore Liga

Source: Soccerway
Rules for classification: 1) Points; 2) Head-to-head points; 3) Head-to-head goal difference; 4) Head-to-head goals scored; 5) Head-to-head away goals scored (only if two teams); 6) Goal difference; 7) Goals scored.
(C) Champions; (R) Relegated

== Georgian Cup Final ==
Final match hold on 18 May 2016 in Kutaisi.

18 May 2016
19:00

Sioni Bolnisi (1)	0–1	Dinamo Tbilisi (1)
		Chanturishvili 29'

Ramaz Shengelia Stadium, Kutaisi
Attendance: 8,000
Referee: Giorgi Kruashvili
