= 2016 Georgian Cup =

Tournament details
- Country: Georgia
- Teams: 32

Final positions
- Champions: Torpedo Kutaisi
- Runners-up: Merani Martvili

The 2016 Georgian Cup (also known as the David Kipiani Cup) is the seventy-fourth season overall and the twenty-seventh since independence of the Georgian annual football tournament. The competition began on 15 August and finished on 22 November 2016.

The defending champions are Dinamo Tbilisi, after winning their twelfth Georgian Cup last season. The winner of the competition qualified for the first qualifying round of the 2017–18 UEFA Europa League.

== Preliminary round ==
The matches were held on 15 August 2016.

15 August 2016 Preliminary Round	Skuri Tsalenjikha (2)	0–2	Imereti Khoni (2)	Tsalenjikha
		Report	Pachkoria 87' (o.g.); Rostiashvili 90'	Stadium: Stadioni Sasha Kvaratskhelia; Attendance: 700; Referee: Irakli Kvirikashvili

15 August 2016 Preliminary Round	Sulori Vani (2)	1–0	Rustavi (2)	Vani
	Rokhvadze 3'	Report		Stadium: Stadioni Grigol Nikoleishvili; Attendance: 500; Referee: Giorgi Avazashvili

15 August 2016 Preliminary Round	Chiatura (2)	1–0	Meshakhte Tkibuli (2)	Chiatura
	Nizharadze 7'	Report		Stadium: Stadioni Temur Maghradze; Attendance: 200; Referee: Papuna Matcharadze

15 August 2016 Preliminary Round	Gardabani (2)	1–0	Mark Stars Tbilisi (2)	Tbilisi
	Gogolidze 26'	Report		Stadium: Ameris Stadioni, Khelovnursapariani Moedani; Attendance: 100; Referee: Shota Kukhilava

== First round ==
The matches were held on 23 and 24 August 2016.

23 August 2016 First Round	Imereti Khoni (2)	1–2	Sioni Bolnisi (1)	Kutaisi
		Report		Stadium: Tsentraluri Stadioni; Attendance: 300; Referee: Jener Khorava

23 August 2016 First Round	Samgurali Tskaltubo (2)	1–4	Torpedo Kutaisi (1)	Tskaltubo
		Report		Stadium: Stadioni 26 Maisi; Attendance: 300; Referee: Shota Kukhilava

23 August 2016 First Round	Merani Martvili (2)	2–0	Dinamo Batumi (1)	Martvili
		Report		Stadium: Tsentraluri Stadioni; Attendance: 1000; Referee: Irakli Kvirikashvili

23 August 2016 First Round	Chkherimela Kharagauli (2)	2–1	Saburtalo Tbilisi (1)	Samtredia
		Report		Stadium: Stadioni Erosi Manjgaladze; Attendance: 100; Referee: Tariel Rukhaia

23 August 2016 First Round	Liakhvi Tskhinvali (2)	2–0	Shukura Kobuleti (1)	Gori
		Report		Stadium: Stadioni Tengiz Burjanadze; Attendance: 200; Referee: Abdullah Baslehlo

23 August 2016 First Round	Gagra (2)	1–2	Guria Lanchkhuti (1)	Tbilisi
		Report		Stadium: Mikheil Meskhis sakhelobis Stadioni; Attendance: 100; Referee: Papuna Matcharadze

23 August 2016 First Round	Chiatura (2)	0–3	Kolkheti-1913 Poti (1)	Chiatura
		Report		Stadium: Stadioni Temur Maghradze; Attendance: 200; Referee: Giorgi Vardidze

23 August 2016 First Round	WIT Georgia (2)	0–1	Locomotive Tbilisi (1)	Tbilisi
		Report		Stadium: Mikheil Meskhis Sakhelobis Stadionis Satadarigo Moedani; Attendance: 150; Referee: Bakur Ninua

23 August 2016 First Round	Sulori Vani (2)	1–0	Zugdidi (1)	Vani
		Report		Stadium: Stadioni Grigol Nikoleishvili; Attendance: 600; Referee: Davit Sanodze

24 August 2016 First Round	Borjomi (2)	4–0	Sapovnela Terjola (2)	Borjomi
		Report		Stadium: Stadioni Jemal Zeinklishvili; Attendance: 300; Referee: Boris Glushchuki

24 August 2016 First Round	Lazika Zugdidi (2)	3–2 (a.e.t.)	Gardabani (2)	Zugdidi
		Report		Stadium: Baias satsvrtneli Baza; Attendance: 200; Referee: Irakli Kherkhadze

24 August 2016 First Round	Khobi (2)	2–0	Tskhinvali (1)	Khobi
		Report		Stadium: Tsentraluri Stadioni; Attendance: 200; Referee: Goga Kikacheishvili

== Second round ==
The matches were held on 21 September 2016.

21 September 2016 2nd Round	Chkherimela Kharagauli (2)	0–3	Samtredia (1)

21 September 2016 2nd Round	Borjomi (2)	0–3	Dinamo Tbilisi (1)

21 September 2016 2nd Round	Khobi (2)	1–3	Chikhura Sachkhere (1)

21 September 2016 2nd Round	Liakhvi Tskhinvali (2)	0–3	Locomotive Tbilisi (1)

21 September 2016 2nd Round	Merani Martvili (2)	1–1 (a.e.t.) (4–3 p)	Dila Gori (1)

21 September 2016 2nd Round	Lazika Zugdidi (2)	3–4	Torpedo Kutaisi (1)

21 September 2016 2nd Round	Sioni Bolnisi (1)	0–1	Kolkheti-1913 Poti (1)

21 September 2016 2nd Round	Sulori Vani (2)	3–1	Guria Lanchkhuti (1)

== Quarterfinals ==
The matches were held on 19 October 2016.

19 October 2016 Quarterfinals	Chikhura Sachkhere (1)	0–0 (a.e.t.) (5–3 p)	Samtredia (1)	Ivantsminda
15:00		Report		Stadium: Tsentraluri Stadioni; Attendance: 500; Referee: George Vadatchkoria

19 October 2016 Quarterfinals	Merani Martvili (2)	1–0 (a.e.t.)	Kolkheti-1913 Poti (1)	Martvili
15:00	Shulaia 100'	Report		Stadium: Tsentraluri Stadioni; Attendance: 1,000; Referee: Bakur Ninua

19 October 2016 Quarterfinals	Sulori Vani (2)	0–1	Torpedo Kutaisi (1)	Vani
15:00		Report	Kvernadze 84'	Stadium: Stadioni Grigol Nikoleishvili; Attendance: 2,000; Referee: Jener Khorava

19 October 2016 Quarterfinals	Dinamo Tbilisi (1)	3–1	Locomotive Tbilisi (1)	Tbilisi
17:00	Kiteishvili 25', 38', 90+2'	Report	Chagelishvili 81'	Stadium: Boris Paichadze Dinamo Arena; Attendance: 500; Referee: Lasha Silagava

== Semifinals ==
The matches were held on 2 November 2016.

2 November 2016 Semifinals	Merani Martvili (2)	3–0	Chikhura Sachkhere (1)	Martvili
14:00	Kantaria 34'; Tskaroziya 53' (pen.); Tsotsonava 90'	Report		Stadium: Tsentraluri Stadioni; Attendance: 1,200; Referee: Girogi Kruashvili

2 November 2016 Semifinals	Dinamo Tbilisi (1)	2–3	Torpedo Kutaisi (1)	Tbilisi
16:00	Jighauri 30', 62'	Report	Tabatadze 19'; Kimadze 47'; Dolidze 90'	Stadium: Boris Paichadze Dinamo Arena; Attendance: 1,200; Referee: Arsen Nonikashvili

== Final ==
22 November 2016
19:00

Merani Martvili (2)	1–2	Torpedo Kutaisi (1)
Sabanadze 53'	Report	Guruli 16'; Tugushi 36'

David Abashidze Stadium, Zestaponi
Attendance: 3,220
Referee: George Vadatchkoria

== See also ==
- 2016 Umaglesi Liga
