= 2016 Pirveli Liga =

Pirveli Liga
- Season: 2016
- Dates: 19 August - 10 December
- Champions: Rustavi; WIT Georgia
- Promoted: None
- Relegated: Borjomi; Skuri; Chiatura; Liakhvi; Sulori; Kolkheti; Sapovnela; Odishi 1919; Gardabani; Mark Stars; Imereti; Chkherimela
- Matches played: 268
- Top goalscorer: Levan Papava (Gagra); 13 goals

The 2016 Pirveli Liga was the 28th and last season under the name Pirveli Liga before the division was reorganized into Erovnuli Liga 2. It began on 19 August and ended with relegation play-off finals on 10 December.

The season was transitional back to the Autumn-Spring system. Apart from this change, the league consisting of 18 teams was due to be reduced to 10 for 2017. Taking into consideration the upcoming exit of four clubs from Umaglesi Liga at the end of this season, a total of twelve teams of Pirveli Liga were doomed for relegation, while no promotion to the top tier was envisaged.

== Team changes ==
The best two teams of the 2015–16 season, Liakhvi and WIT Georgia, were denied promotion to Umaglesi Liga. Georgian Football Federation referred to discrepancies found in submitted license documents as the reason behind this decision. Therefore, they both remained in Pirveli Liga.

=== To Pirveli Liga ===
==== Promoted from Meore Liga ====
Sulori Vani • Gardabani • Mark Stars

==== Relegated from Umaglesi Liga ====
Merani Martvili • Sapovnela Terjola

=== From Pirveli Liga ===
==== Relegated to Meore Liga ====
Betlemi Keda • Samegrelo Chkhorotsku • Matchakhela Khelvachauri • Algeti Marneuli • Mertskhali Ozurgeti

==== Promoted to Umaglesi Liga ====
None

== Review ==
Within four months the clubs completed the regular season in two groups. Those, who qualified for relegation round, took part in play-offs based on the knock-out rule. As a result, even a third-placed team quit the league.

The season turned out unusual for a large amount of disciplinary decisions made by the Federation with regards to some league members. Overall, 11 teams out of 18 were deducted points for different reasons. Two clubs were found guilty of match-fixing offences, had their points annulled and expelled from the league.

== Teams and stadiums ==
Team	City/Town	Stadium	Capacity
Borjomi	Borjomi	Jemal Zeinklishvili Stadium	3,000
Chiatura	Chiatura	Temur Maghradze Stadium	11,700
Chkherimela Kharagauli	Kharagauli	Soso Abashidze Stadium	2,000
Gagra	Tbilisi	Merani Stadium	2,000
Gardabani	Tbilisi	Ameris Stadioni	500
Imereti Khoni	Khoni	Central Stadium	1,000
Kolkheti Khobi	Khobi	Central Stadium	12,000
Liakhvi Tskhinvali	Gori	Kartli Stadium	1,500
Mark Stars	Tbilisi	Sport complex Shatili	2,000
Merani Martvili	Martvili	Murtaz Khurtsilava Stadium	2,000
Meshakhte Tkibuli	Tkibuli	Vladimer Bochorishvili Stadium	6,000
Odishi 1919 Zugdidi	Zugdidi	Baias Baza	2,000
Rustavi	Rustavi	Poladi Stadium	6,000
Samgurali Tskaltubo	Tskaltubo	26 May Stadium	12,000
Skuri Tsalenjikha	Tsalenjikha	Sasha Kvaratskhelia Stadium	4,000
Sapovnela Terjola	Terjola	Central Stadium	2,500
Sulori Vani	Vani	Stadioni Grigol Nikoleishvili	2,000
WIT Georgia	Mtskheta	Mtskheta Park	2,000

== League table ==
=== Group Red ===
Pos	Team	Pld	W	D	L	GF	GA	GD	Pts	Qualification or relegation
1	WIT Georgia (C)	16	11	3	2	34	14	+20	36	
2	Gagra	16	9	4	3	29	21	+8	28 (Note: Gagra, Borjomi, Sulori, Chiatura and Odishi 1919 were deducted 3 points)	
3	Borjomi (R)	16	8	1	7	22	17	+5	22	Qualification for Relegation play-offs
4	Skuri (R)	16	6	3	7	32	24	+8	21	Qualification for Relegation play-offs
5	Sulori (R)	16	7	3	6	20	21	−1	21	Qualification for Relegation play-offs
6	Chiatura (R)	16	7	2	7	15	21	−6	20	Qualification for Relegation play-offs
7	Sapovnela (R)	16	5	4	7	14	18	−4	19	Relegation to Liga 3
8	Odishi 1919 (R)	16	7	1	8	31	32	−1	19	Relegation to Liga 3
9	Gardabani (R)	16	1	1	14	13	42	−29	4	Relegation to Liga 3

Source: Soccerway
Rules for classification: 1) Points; 2) Head-to-head points; 3) Head-to-head goal difference; 4) Head-to-head goals scored; 5) Head-to-head away goals scored (only if two teams); 6) Goal difference; 7) Goals scored.
(C) Champions; (R) Relegated

=== Group White ===
Pos	Team	Pld	W	D	L	GF	GA	GD	Pts	Qualification or relegation
1	Rustavi (C)	16	12	2	2	40	15	+25	32 (Note: Rustavi, Merani, Liakhvi and Chkherimela were deducted 6 points)	
2	Samgurali	16	10	2	4	29	24	+5	32	
3	Meshakhte (O)	16	9	2	5	25	12	+13	29	Qualification for Relegation play-offs
4	Merani (O)	16	9	5	2	31	11	+20	26	Qualification for Relegation play-offs
5	Kolkheti (R)	16	5	6	5	20	24	−4	21	Qualification for Relegation play-offs
6	Liakhvi (R)	16	2	4	10	16	39	−23	4	Qualification for Relegation play-offs
7	Mark Stars (R)	16	1	3	12	15	34	−19	3 (Note: Mark Stars were deducted 3 points)	Relegation to Liga 3
8	Imereti (R)	16	4	3	9	20	29	−9	0 (Note: Imereti were deducted 15 points)	Relegation to Liga 3
9	Chkherimela (R)	16	1	3	12	13	45	−32	0	Relegation to Liga 3

Source: Soccerway
Rules for classification: 1) Points; 2) Head-to-head points; 3) Head-to-head goal difference; 4) Head-to-head goals scored; 5) Head-to-head away goals scored (only if two teams); 6) Goal difference; 7) Goals scored.
(C) Champions; (O) Play-off winners; (R) Relegated

== Relegation play-offs ==
Quarterfinals
Liakhvi	1	0	1
Borjomi	1	7	8
Sulori	0	0	0
Merani	1	6	7
Kolkheti	1	0	1
Skuri	2	3	5
Chiatura	0	1	1
Meshakhte	2	4	6

Semifinals
Borjomi	0	2	2
Merani	2	1	3
Skuri	0	0	0
Meshakhte	0	2	2

Finals

Following these play-offs Merani Martvili and Meshakhte Tkibuli retained their places in Pirveli Liga.
