= 2014–15 Pirveli Liga =

Pirveli Liga
- Season: 2014–15
- Champions: Saburtalo Tbilisi (Group A); Sapovnela Terjola (Group B)
- Promoted: Saburtalo Tbilisi; Sapovnela Terjola; Locomotive Tbilisi
- Relegated: Adeli Batumi; Skuri Tsalenjikha; STU Tbilisi; Dinamo-2 Tbilisi
- Matches: 359
- Goals: 1,102 (3.07 per match)
- Top goalscorer: Mamia Gavashelishvili (44 goals)

2014–15 Pirveli Liga was the 26th season of the Georgian Pirveli Liga. The season began on 25 August 2014 and finished on 23 May 2015.

== Participating teams ==
=== Group A ===
Team	City/Town	Stadium	Capacity
Adeli Batumi	Batumi	Adeli Stadium	1,500
Chkherimela Kharagauli	Kharagauli	Soso Abashidze Stadium	2,000
Chiatura	Chiatura	Temur Maghradze Stadium	11,700
Lazika Zugdidi	Zugdidi	Baia Training base	1,500
Locomotive Tbilisi	Tbilisi	Saguramos Sapekhburto Complex	700
Matchakhela Khelvachauri	khelvachauri	Central Stadium	1,000
Saburtalo Tbilisi	Tbilisi	Bendela Stadium	1,000
Samgurali Tskaltubo	Tskaltubo	26 May Stadium	12,000
Sasco Tbilisi	Tbilisi	Shatili Sport Complex	2,000
STU Tbilisi	Tbilisi	Shatili Sport Complex	2,000

=== Group B ===
Team	City/Town	Stadium	Capacity
Algeti Marneuli	Tbilisi	Sport Academy Stadium	1,000
Betlemi Keda	Keda	Central Stadium	1,000
Borjomi	Borjomi	Jemal Zeinklishvili Stadium	3,000
Dinamo-2 Tbilisi	Tbilisi	Dinamo Dighmi Training base	1,000
Gagra	Tbilisi	Merani Stadium	2,000
Kolkheti Khobi	Khobi	Central Stadium	12,000
Mertskhali Ozurgeti	Ozurgeti	Megobroba Stadium	3,500
Meshakhte Tkibuli	Tkibuli	Vladimer Bochorishvili Stadium	6,000
Sapovnela Terjola	Terjola	Central Stadium	1,000
Skuri Tsalenjikha	Tsalenjikha	Sasha Kvaratskhelia Stadium	4,000

== League tables ==
=== Group A ===
Pos	Team	Pld	W	D	L	GF	GA	GD	Pts	Promotion or relegation
1	Saburtalo Tbilisi (C, P)	36	28	3	5	92	25	+67	87	Promotion to Umaglesi Liga
2	Locomotive Tbilisi (P)	36	21	5	10	87	42	+45	68	Qualification for Promotion play-offs
3	Lazika Zugdidi	36	20	6	10	69	41	+28	66	
4	Samgurali Tskaltubo	36	19	3	14	76	50	+26	60	
5	Chiatura	36	17	3	16	53	52	+1	54	
6	Matchakhela Khelvachauri	36	14	3	19	48	66	−18	45	
7	Sasco Tbilisi	36	11	9	16	61	67	−6	42	
8	Chkherimela Kharagauli	36	12	4	20	35	71	−36	40	
9	Adeli Batumi (R)	36	11	2	23	47	97	−50	35	Relegation to Meore Liga
10	STU Tbilisi (R)	36	6	4	26	37	94	−57	22	Relegation to Meore Liga

Source: Soccerway
Rules for classification: 1) Points; 2) Head-to-head points; 3) Head-to-head goal difference; 4) Head-to-head goals scored; 5) Head-to-head away goals scored (only if two teams); 6) Goal difference; 7) Goals scored.
(C) Champions; (P) Promoted; (R) Relegated

=== Group B ===
Pos	Team	Pld	W	D	L	GF	GA	GD	Pts	Promotion or relegation
1	Sapovnela Terjola (C, P)	36	23	8	5	64	28	+36	77	Promotion to Umaglesi Liga
2	Borjomi	36	16	6	14	40	43	−3	54	Qualification for Promotion play-offs
3	Gagra	35	15	5	15	59	44	+15	50	
4	Betlemi Keda	36	14	7	15	51	50	+1	49	
5	Mertskhali Ozurgeti	36	13	9	14	45	68	−23	48	
6	Algeti Marneuli	36	12	11	13	47	39	+8	47	
7	Meshakhte Tkibuli	36	14	5	17	57	55	+2	47	
8	Kolkheti Khobi	35	12	10	13	46	48	−2	46	
9	Skuri Tsalenjikha (R)	36	11	13	12	47	55	−8	46	Relegation to Meore Liga
10	Dinamo-2 Tbilisi (R)	36	9	6	21	42	68	−26	33	Relegation to Meore Liga

Source: Soccerway
Rules for classification: 1) Points; 2) Head-to-head points; 3) Head-to-head goal difference; 4) Head-to-head goals scored; 5) Head-to-head away goals scored (only if two teams); 6) Goal difference; 7) Goals scored.
(C) Champions; (P) Promoted; (R) Relegated

=== Promotion play-offs ===
23 May 2015
16:30 UTC+4

Borjomi	3 – 3 (a.e.t.) 2–4 on penalties	Locomotive Tbilisi
Rostiashvili 29'; Chkhartishvili 50'; Kirvalidze 90+1'	Report	Kiknadze 15', 33'; Gavashelishvili 85'

Mikheil Meskhi Stadium, Tbilisi
Attendance: 1,000
Referee: Lasha Silagava (Tbilisi)

== See also ==
- 2014–15 Umaglesi Liga
- 2014–15 Georgian Cup
