= 2017 Liga 3 (Georgia) =

Football season in Georgia

Liga 3
- Season: 2017
- Dates: 19 March - 24 November
- Champions: Shevardeni-1906
- Promoted: Shevardeni-1906; Norchi Dinamo; Telavi
- Relegated: Margveti; Skuri; Odishi 1919; Chkherimela; Liakhvi; Sapovnela
- Matches: 380
- Goals: 1,030 (2.71 per match)
- Biggest home win: Shevardeni-1906 12-0 Samegrelo (8 November)
- Biggest away win: Sapovnela 0-8 Algeti (10 October)
- Highest scoring: Shevardeni-1906 12-0 Samegrelo (8 November)

Тhe 2017 Liga 3 (formerly Meore Liga) was the first season under its current name and 30th third-tier season in Georgia. It began on 19 March and ended on 24 November.

== Team changes ==
After the 2016 season many teams changed their division. A total 56 of them were relegated from this division only, which reduced the number of participants from 64 to 20 within one season. This exodus resulted from the announced reorganization of the entire league system and a transitional status given to all domestic divisions before these changes could take effect in 2017.

=== Relegated from Pirveli Liga ===
Borjomi ● Skuri ● Sulori Vani ● Chiatura ● Sapovnela ● Odishi 1919 ● Gardabani ● Chkherimela ● Imereti ● Mark Stars Tbilisi ● Liakhvi ● Kolkheti Khobi

=== Relegated from Meore Liga ===
West Sairme Bagdati ● Torpedo Kutaisi-2 ● Racha Ambrolauri ● Samgurali Tskaltubo-2 ● Imereti Khoni-2 ● Meshakhte Tkibuli-2 ● Mertskhali Ozurgeti ● Salkhino Martvili ● Lesichine ● Machakhela Khelvachauri ● Egrisi Senaki ● Chela Darcheli ● Kolkheti Khobi-2 ● Bakhmaro Chokhatauri ● Khikhani Khulo ● Dinamo Batumi-2 ● Zana ● Odishi 1919-2 ● Enguri Jvari

Centre

Iveria Khashuri ● Kojaeli Mtskheta ● Tori Borjomi ● Meskheti Akhaltsikhe ● Abuli Akhalkalaki ● Mtskheta ● Paravani Ninotsminda

East

Aragvi Dusheti ● WIT Georgia-2 ● Liakhvi Achabeti ● Voyage ● Tbilisi 2016 ● Tiflisi ● Aphkazeti ● Tianeti ● Rustavi-2 ● Gareji Sagarejo ● Sarti Sartichala ● Alazani Gurjaani ● Hereti Chabukiani ● Duruji Kvareli ● Bakhtrioni Akhmeta ● Locomotive Tbilisi-2 ● Kolkhi Gulripshi ● Sinatle ● Iberia 2010 Tbilisi ● 35-e Skola ● Amirani Ochamchire ● Shavnabada ● Samgori ● Tskhumi Sokhumi ● Saburtalo-2 Tbilisi ● Sakartvelos Universiteti ● Dinamo Sokhumi ● Era ● Avaza ● Algeti XXI

== Teams and stadiums ==
Clubs	Location	Venue	Capacity	Region
Algeti	Tbilisi	Shatili Stadium	2,000	Tbilisi
Betlemi	Keda	Centraluri Stadioni	1,000	Adjara
Borjomi	Borjomi	Jemal Zeinklishvili Stadium	3,000	Samtskhe-Javakheti
Chiatura	Chiatura	Stadioni Temur Maghradze	11,700	Imereti
Chkherimela	Kharagauli	Stadioni Soso Abashidze	2,000	Imereti
Gardabani	Gardabani	Martkopi Saragbo Baza	4,000	Kvemo Kartli
Gori	Gori	Kartli	1,500	Shida Kartli
Imereti	Khoni	Centraluri stadioni	2,000	Imereti
Kolkheti	Khobi	Centraluri stadioni	12,000	Samegrelo-Zemo Svaneti
Liakhvi	Gori	Kartli	1,500	Mtskheta-Mtianeti
Margveti	Zestaponi	Stadioni Davit Abashidze	1,000	Imereti
Mark Stars	Tbilisi	Stadioni Torpedo-Avaza	1,000	Tbilisi
Norchi Dinamo	Tbilisi	Shatili	2,000	Tbilisi
Odishi 1919	Zugdidi	Baias baza	2,000	Samegrelo-Zemo Svaneti
Samegrelo	Chkhorotsku	Centraluri stadioni	3,000	Samegrelo-Zemo Svaneti
Sapovnela	Terjola	Centraluri stadioni	2,500	Imereti
Shevardeni 1906	Tbilisi	David Petriashvili Arena	2,130	Tbilisi
Skuri	Tsalenjikha	Stadioni Sasha Kvaratskhelia	4,000	Samegrelo-Zemo Svaneti
Sulori	Vani	Stadioni Grigol Nikoleishvili	3,000	Imereti
Telavi	Telavi	Stadioni Givi Chokheli	12,000	Kakheti

== League table ==
The teams were initially divided equally into White and Red Groups. After a two-round tournament they formed Promotion and Relegation groups. The winner won automatic promotion to Erovnuli Liga 2, while the teams in second and third places played against Liga 2 opponents in a two-legged tie.

All teams of the drop-zone quartet participated in the second tier the previous year, therefore they suffered double relegation in successive seasons.

=== White Group ===
Pos	Team	Pld	W	D	L	GF	GA	GD	Pts	Promotion, qualification or relegation
1	Shevardeni-1906	18	12	2	4	36	19	+17	38	Qualification for Promotion Group
2	Telavi	18	10	5	3	30	18	+12	35	Qualification for Promotion Group
3	Norchi Dinamo	18	10	4	4	39	24	+15	34	Qualification for Promotion Group
4	Mark Stars	18	6	7	5	31	29	+2	25	Qualification for Promotion Group
5	Gardabani	18	6	6	6	26	24	+2	24	Qualification for Promotion Group
6	Gori	18	6	5	7	26	24	+2	23	Qualification for Relegation Round
7	Borjomi	18	6	4	8	16	21	−5	22	Qualification for Relegation Round
8	Algeti	18	5	6	7	25	27	−2	21	Qualification for Relegation Round
9	Chkherimela	18	3	6	9	18	31	−13	15	Qualification for Relegation Round
10	Liakhvi	18	2	3	13	17	47	−30	9	Qualification for Relegation Round

Rules for classification: 1) Points; 2) Head-to-head points; 3) Head-to-head goal difference; 4) Head-to-head goals scored; 5) Head-to-head away goals scored (only if two teams); 6) Goal difference; 7) Goals scored.

=== Red Group ===
Pos	Team	Pld	W	D	L	GF	GA	GD	Pts	Promotion, qualification or relegation
1	Chiatura	18	12	4	2	32	14	+18	40	Qualification for Promotion Group
2	Imereti	18	9	6	3	20	10	+10	33	Qualification for Promotion Group
3	Kolkheti	18	8	5	5	25	18	+7	29	Qualification for Promotion Group
4	Betlemi	18	7	7	4	34	20	+14	28	Qualification for Promotion Group
5	Samegrelo	18	6	9	3	20	14	+6	27	Qualification for Promotion Group
6	Sulori	18	7	3	8	20	19	+1	24	Qualification for Relegation Round
7	Margveti	18	5	6	7	21	28	−7	21	Qualification for Relegation Round
8	Skuri	18	4	5	9	16	27	−11	17	Qualification for Relegation Round
9	Odishi 1919	18	3	5	10	13	27	−14	14	Qualification for Relegation Round
10	Sapovnela	18	1	6	11	7	31	−24	9	Qualification for Relegation Round

Rules for classification: 1) Points; 2) Head-to-head points; 3) Head-to-head goal difference; 4) Head-to-head goals scored; 5) Head-to-head away goals scored (only if two teams); 6) Goal difference; 7) Goals scored.

=== Promotion Group ===
Pos	Team	Pld	W	D	L	GF	GA	GD	Pts	Promotion, qualification or relegation
1	Shevardeni-1906	18	13	4	1	49	10	+39	43	Promotion to Erovnuli Liga 2
2	Norchi Dinamo	18	12	3	3	45	21	+24	39	Qualification for Promotion play-offs
3	Telavi	18	12	3	3	56	15	+41	39	Qualification for Promotion play-offs
4	Gardabani	18	9	4	5	40	18	+22	31	
5	Mark Stars	18	7	3	8	37	32	+5	24	
6	Imereti	18	5	6	7	13	26	−13	21	
7	Chiatura	18	5	2	11	15	33	−18	17	
8	Betlemi	18	4	4	10	23	44	−21	16	
9	Kolkheti	18	3	4	11	9	39	−30	13	
10	Samegrelo	18	1	5	12	12	61	−49	8	

Rules for classification: 1) Points; 2) Head-to-head points; 3) Head-to-head goal difference; 4) Head-to-head goals scored; 5) Head-to-head away goals scored (only if two teams); 6) Goal difference; 7) Goals scored.

=== Relegation Round ===
Pos	Team	Pld	W	D	L	GF	GA	GD	Pts	Promotion, qualification or relegation
1	Gori	18	9	6	3	31	12	+19	33	
2	Algeti	18	9	4	5	36	19	+17	31	
3	Borjomi	18	8	6	4	30	21	+9	30	
4	Sulori	18	9	3	6	20	21	−1	30	
5	Margveti	18	8	5	5	27	17	+10	29	Relegation play-offs
6	Skuri	18	6	6	6	22	22	0	24	Relegation play-offs
7	Odishi 1919	18	7	3	8	27	31	−4	24	Relegation to Regionuli Liga
8	Chkherimela	18	6	5	7	22	27	−5	23	Relegation to Regionuli Liga
9	Liakhvi	18	6	1	11	35	37	−2	19	Relegation to Regionuli Liga
10	Sapovnela	18	1	3	14	9	52	−43	6	Relegation to Regionuli Liga

Rules for classification: 1) Points; 2) Head-to-head points; 3) Head-to-head goal difference; 4) Head-to-head goals scored; 5) Head-to-head away goals scored (only if two teams); 6) Goal difference; 7) Goals scored.

== Promotion play-offs ==
30 November 2017
13:00 UTC+4

Telavi	2–1	Guria Lanchkhuti
Kharebashvili 56'; Nozadze 90+2' (pen.)	Report	Tela 61'

Givi Chokheli Stadium, Telavi
Attendance: 1,000
Referee: Giorgi Vardidze
3 December 2017
13:00 UTC+4

Guria Lanchkhuti	1–1	Telavi
Shengelia 82'	Report	Nikabadze 45'

Evgrapi Shevardnadze Stadium, Lanchkhuti
Referee: Irakli Kakabadze

Telavi won 3–2 on aggregate.

30 November 2017
14:30 UTC+4

Meshakhte Tkibuli	0–2	Norchi Dinamo
	Report	Deisadze 40'; Melkadze 63'

Ramaz Shengelia Stadium, Kutaisi
Attendance: 200
Referee: Bakur Ninua
3 December 2017
13:00 UTC+4

Norchi Dinamo	4–0	Meshakhte Tkibuli
Pipia 2'; Deisadze 59'; Gogoberishvili 68'; Shengelidze 81'	Report

Sport-kompleksi Shatili, Tbilisi
Attendance: 300
Referee: Davit Kharitonashvili

Norchi Dinamo won 6–0 on aggregate.
