= 2014–15 Georgian Cup =

Tournament details
- Country: Georgia
- Teams: 28

Final positions
- Champions: Dinamo Tbilisi
- Runners-up: Samtredia

The 2014–15 Georgian Cup (also known as the David Kipiani Cup) was the seventy-second season overall and the twenty-fifth since independence of the Georgian annual football tournament. The competition began on 19 August 2014 and finished on 26 May 2014. The defending champions are Dinamo Tbilisi, after winning their eleventh Georgian Cup last season. The winner of the competition qualified for the second qualifying round of the 2015–16 UEFA Europa League.

== First round ==
The first legs were held on 19 and 20 August, with the return matches from 16 September.

Team 1	Agg.	Team 2	1st leg	2nd leg
Shukura Kobuleti (1)	2–2 (a.e.t.) (4–3 p)	Samgurali Tskaltubo (2)	1–1	1–1
Dila Gori (1)	4–1	Locomotive Tbilisi (2)	3–1	1–0
Chiatura (2)	2–5	Dinamo Batumi (1)	0–5	2–0
Sasco Tbilisi (2)	3–3(a)	Metalurgi Rustavi (1)	1–1	2–2
WIT Georgia (1)	6–3	Gagra (2)	4–2	2–1
Saburtalo Tbilisi (2)	2–4	Spartaki-Tskhinvali (1)	2–1	0–3
Guria Lanchkhuti (1)	3–3 (a.e.t.) (0–3 p)	Sapovnela Terjola (2)	1–2	2–1
Merani Martvili (1)	7–3	Mertskhali Ozurgeti (2)	4–1	3–2
Torpedo Kutaisi (1)	6–2	Chkherimela Kharagauli (2)	1–0	5–2
Kolkheti Poti (1)	7–0	Skuri Tsalenjikha (2)	1–0	6–0
Betlemi Keda (2)	1–7	Samtredia (1)	0–3	1–4
Matchakhela Khelvachauri (2)	3–4	Zugdidi (1)	0–2	3–2

=== First legs ===
19 August 2014 1	Shukura Kobuleti (1)	1–1	Samgurali Tskaltubo (2)	Samtredia
	Bregvadze 72'		Tukhareli 49'	Stadium: Stadioni Erosi Manjgaladze; Attendance: 200; Referee: Davit Sanodze

19 August 2014 1	Dinamo Batumi (1)	5–0	Chiatura (2)	Kobuleti
	Beriashvili 13'; Mujiri 18'; Shonia 41', 68'; Diasamidze 80'			Stadium: Chele Arena; Attendance: 300; Referee: Goga Kikacheishvili

19 August 2014 1	Locomotive Tbilisi (2)	1–3	Dila Gori (1)	Saguramo
	Kukhalashvili 59'		Modebadze 43', 57'; Razmadze 67' (pen.)	Stadium: Saguramos sapekhburto kompleksi Referee: Giorgi Kruashvili

20 August 2014 1	Sapovnela Terjola (2)	2–1	Guria Lanchkhuti (1)	Terjola
	Labadze 32'; Kentchoshvili 90+2'		Shalamberidze 16'	Stadium: Tsentraluri Stadioni; Attendance: 300; Referee: Giorgi Avazashvili

20 August 2014 1	Mertskhali Ozurgeti (2)	1–4	Merani Martvili (1)	Ozurgeti
	Bakradze 12'		Tsitskhvaia 33', 42'; Chimakadze 41'; Poniava 60'	Stadium: Munitsipaluri Tsentraluri Stadioni; Attendance: 400; Referee: Irakli Kvirikashvili

20 August 2014 1	Chkherimela Kharagauli (2)	0–1	Torpedo Kutaisi (1)	Ozurgeti
			Keburia 55'	Stadium: Stadioni Soso Abashidze; Attendance: 500; Referee: Zviad Tughushi

20 August 2014 1	Skuri Tsalenjikha (2)	0–1	Kolkheti Poti (1)	Tsalenjikha
			Gugushvili 20'	Stadium: Stadioni Sasha Kvaratskhelia; Attendance: 300; Referee: Vakhtang Basilaia

20 August 2014 1	Samtredia (1)	3–0	Betlemi Keda (2)	Samtredia
	Dolidze 27'; Gabedava 39'; Kantaria 70'			Stadium: Stadioni Erosi Manjgaladze; Attendance: 1000; Referee: Boris Glushchuki

20 August 2014 1	Zugdidi (1)	2–0	Matchakhela Khelvachauri (2)	Zugdidi
	Ghonghadze 21', 76'			Stadium: Baias satsvrtneli Baza; Attendance: 500; Referee: Giorgi Dograshvili

20 August 2014 1	Gagra (2)	2–4	WIT Georgia (1)	Mukhrani
	Nozadze 7'; Chitishvili 85'		Tatkhashvili 17', 65'; Dadiani 19'; Kukhaleishvili 23'	Stadium: Tsentraluri Stadioni; Attendance: 100; Referee: Arsen Nonikashvili

20 August 2014 1	Metalurgi Rustavi (1)	1–1	Sasco Tbilisi (2)	Rustavi
	Khabelashvili 7'		Berianidze 41'	Stadium: Stadioni Poladi; Attendance: 150; Referee: Bakur Ninua

20 August 2014 1	Spartaki-Tskhinvali (1)	1–2	Saburtalo Tbilisi (2)	Tbilisi
	Katcharava 7'		Khorkheli 71'; Menteshashvili 82' (pen.)	Stadium: Mikheil Meskhi Stadium; Attendance: 200; Referee: Jener Khorava

== Second round ==
The first legs were held on 17 and 18 November, with the return matches on 25 and 26 November.

Team 1	Agg.	Team 2	1st leg	2nd leg
Dila Gori (1)	1–1(a)	Kolkheti Poti (1)	0–0	1–1
Dinamo Batumi (1)	4–4(a)	Samtredia (1)	4–1	0–3
Shukura Kobuleti (1)	2–4	Dinamo Tbilisi (1)	1–1	1–3
Chikhura Sachkhere (1)	1–0	Zestaponi (1)	0–0	1–0
Merani Martvili (1)	4–6	Torpedo Kutaisi (1)	0–3	4–3
Zugdidi (1)	0–7	Metalurgi Rustavi (1)	0–2	0–5
WIT Georgia (1)	4–3	Sioni Bolnisi (1)	1–0	3–3
Spartaki-Tskhinvali (1)	3–0	Sapovnela Terjola (2)	3–0	0–0

== Quarterfinals ==
The first legs were held on 18 February, with the return matches on 9 March.

Team 1	Agg.	Team 2	1st leg	2nd leg
Dila Gori (1)	0–1	Dinamo Tbilisi (1)	0–0	0–1
Spartaki-Tskhinvali (1)	8–6	WIT Georgia (1)	4–5	4–1
Metalurgi Rustavi (1)	0–3	Chikhura Sachkhere (1)	0–0	0–3
Samtredia (1)	2–1	Torpedo Kutaisi (1)	2–1	0–0

== Semi-finals ==
The first legs were held on 7 April, with the return matches on 28 April.

Team 1	Agg.	Team 2	1st leg	2nd leg
Dinamo Tbilisi (1)	2–1	Spartaki-Tskhinvali (1)	2–0	0–1
Chikhura Sachkhere (1)	0–4	Samtredia (1)	0–1	0–3

== Final ==
26 May 2015
20:00 UTC+4

Dinamo Tbilisi	5–0	Samtredia
Papunashvili 15', 53'; Onwu 50', 68'; Volkovi 87'

Mikheil Meskhi Stadium, Tbilisi
Attendance: 2,000
Referee: Marco Fritz (Germany)

== See also ==
- 2014–15 Umaglesi Liga
- 2014–15 Pirveli Liga
