= 2015–16 Pirveli Liga =

Pirveli Liga
- Season: 2015–16
- Champions: Liakhvi Tskhinvali
- Promoted: None
- Relegated: Betlemi Keda; Samegrelo Chkhorotsku; Matchakhela Khelvachauri; Algeti Marneuli; Mertskhali Ozurgeti
- Matches: 306
- Goals: 800 (2.61 per match)
- Top goalscorer: Zurab Ghirdaladze (20 goals)

2015–16 Pirveli Liga was the 27th season of the Georgian Pirveli Liga. The season began on 2 September 2015 and finished on 21 May 2016.

== Format ==
The tournament consisted of 18 teams. The first two teams went straight to the top of the Premier League, and the third place player had a Playoff with a 14th place finisher. However, due to a change of league format, eventually no team were promoted to the top division.

== Teams and stadiums ==
Team	City/Town	Stadium	Capacity
Algeti Marneuli	Tbilisi	Sport Academy Stadium	1,000
Betlemi Keda	Keda	Central Stadium	1,000
Borjomi	Borjomi	Jemal Zeinklishvili Stadium	3,000
Chiatura	Chiatura	Temur Maghradze Stadium	11,700
Chkherimela Kharagauli	Kharagauli	Soso Abashidze Stadium	2,000
Gagra	Tbilisi	Merani Stadium	2,000
Imereti Khoni	Khoni	Central Stadium	1,000
Kolkheti Khobi	Khobi	Central Stadium	12,000
Liakhvi Tskhinvali	Gori	Kartlis Stadium	1,500
Matchakhela Khelvachauri	Khelvachauri	Central Stadium	1,000
Mertskhali Ozurgeti	Ozurgeti	Megobroba Stadium	3,500
Meshakhte Tkibuli	Tkibuli	Vladimer Bochorishvili Stadium	6,000
Odishi 1919 Zugdidi	Zugdidi		
Rustavi	Rustavi	Poladi Stadium	6,000
Samegrelo Chkhorotsku	Chkhorotsku	Central Stadium	
Samgurali Tskaltubo	Tskaltubo	26 May Stadium	12,000
Skuri Tsalenjikha	Tsalenjikha	Sasha Kvaratskhelia Stadium	4,000
WIT Georgia	Mtskheta	Mtskheta Park	2,000

== League table ==
Pos	Team	Pld	W	D	L	GF	GA	GD	Pts	Relegation
1	Liakhvi Tskhinvali (C)	34	20	9	5	82	36	+46	69	
2	WIT Georgia	34	18	10	6	61	26	+35	64	
3	Kolkheti Khobi	34	18	10	6	60	29	+31	64	
4	Borjomi	34	17	10	7	45	32	+13	61	
5	Gagra	34	16	4	14	54	38	+16	52	
6	Samgurali Tskaltubo	34	16	3	15	60	46	+14	51	
7	Odishi 1919 Zugdidi	34	14	6	14	52	58	−6	48	
8	Chkherimela Kharagauli	34	12	7	15	39	50	−11	43	
9	Rustavi	34	10	13	11	33	33	0	43	
10	Skuri Tsalenjikha	34	11	10	13	32	33	−1	43	
11	Meshakhte Tkibuli	34	10	12	12	28	31	−3	42	
12	Chiatura	34	9	15	10	41	48	−7	42	
13	Imereti Khoni	34	10	11	13	34	53	−19	41	
14	Betlemi Keda (R)	34	12	4	18	41	65	−24	40	Relegation to Meore Liga
15	Samegrelo Chkhorotsku (R)	34	10	8	16	32	50	−18	38	Relegation to Meore Liga
16	Matchakhela Khelvachauri (R)	34	8	13	13	30	43	−13	37	Relegation to Meore Liga
17	Algeti Marneuli (R)	34	9	7	18	34	52	−18	34	Relegation to Meore Liga
18	Mertskhali Ozurgeti (R)	34	6	8	20	42	77	−35	26	Relegation to Meore Liga

Source: Soccerway
Rules for classification: 1) Points; 2) Head-to-head points; 3) Head-to-head goal difference; 4) Head-to-head goals scored; 5) Head-to-head away goals scored (only if two teams); 6) Goal difference; 7) Goals scored.
(C) Champions; (R) Relegated

== See also ==
- 2015–16 Umaglesi Liga
- 2015–16 Georgian Cup
