= 2013–14 Georgian Cup =

Tournament details
- Country: Georgia
- Teams: 28

Final positions
- Champions: Dinamo Tbilisi
- Runners-up: Chikhura Sachkhere

The 2013–14 Georgian Cup (also known as the David Kipiani Cup) is the seventieth season overall and the twenty-fourth since independence of the Georgian annual football tournament. The competition began on 21 August 2013 and will end with the final in May 2014. The defending champions are Dinamo Tbilisi, after winning their tenth ever Georgian Cup last season. The winner of the competition will qualify for the second qualifying round of the 2014–15 UEFA Europa League.

== First round ==
The first legs were held on 21 and 22 August, with the return matches from 17 September.

Team 1	Agg.	Team 2	1st leg	2nd leg
Algeti Marneuli (2)	2–5	Locomotive Tbilisi (2)	1–2	1–3
Baia Zugdidi (1)	2–3	Khobi (2)	1–1	1–2 (a.e.t.)
Guria Lanchkhuti (1)	8–3	Sapovnela Terjola (2)	5–1	3–2
Samtredia (2)	2–4	Merani Martvili (1)	2–4	0–0
Shukura Kobuleti (2)	3–1	Skuri Tsalenjikha (2)	1–0	2–1
Sioni Bolnisi (1)	11–3	STU Tbilisi (2)	6–1	5–2
Liakhvi Achabeti (2)	w/o	WIT Georgia (1)	w/o	w/o
Spartaki-Tskhinvali Tbilisi (1)	7–3	Chiatura (2)	4–1	3–2
Metalurgi Rustavi (1)	3–1	Gagra (2)	2–0	1–1
Dinamo Batumi (2)	9–1	Mertskhali Ozurgeti (2)	6–0	3–1
Samgurali Tskaltubo (2)	1–3	Kolkheti-1913 Poti (2)	1–2	0–1
Sulori Vani (2)	0–10	Zestaponi (1)	0–5	0–5

=== First legs ===
21 August 2013	Algeti Marneuli	1 – 2	Locomotive Tbilisi	Marneuli
11:30 (GET)	Jojishvili 10'	Report	Zarandia 29', 68'	Stadium: Marneuli Central Stadium; Attendance: 200; Referee: Bakur Ninua

21 August 2013	Baia Zugdidi	1 – 1	Khobi	Zugdidi
17:00 (GET)	Khubua 45'	Report	Gabrava 62'	Stadium: Gulia Tutberidze Stadium; Attendance: 400; Referee: Davit Kharitonashvili

21 August 2013	Guria Lanchkhuti	5 – 1	Sapovnela Terjola	Lanchkhuti
17:00 (GET)	Shalamberidze 12'; Iobashvili 14', 50'; Chikviladze 27' (pen.); Toronjadze 52'	Report	Shavgulidze 44'	Stadium: Evgrapi Shevardnadze Stadium; Attendance: 300; Referee: Otar Khetsadze

21 August 2013	Samtredia	2 – 4	Merani Martvili	Samtredia
17:00 (GET)	Bagashvili 52'; Bokhua 77'	Report	Shulaia 7'; Kvantaliani 35', 65', 68'	Stadium: Erosi Manjgaladze Stadium; Attendance: 500; Referee: George Vadatchkoria

21 August 2013	Shukura Kobuleti	1 – 0	Skuri Tsalenjikha	Kobuleti
17:00 (GET)	Bajelidze 89'	Report		Stadium: Chele Arena; Referee: Irakli Kvirikashvili

21 August 2013	Sioni Bolnisi	6 – 1	STU Tbilisi	Bolnisi
17:00 (GET)	Ugulava 36', 38'; Aptsiauri 50'; Kakhelishvili 53'; Mikuchadze 77', 85'	Report	Gogatishvili 82'	Stadium: Tamaz Stepania Stadium; Attendance: 200; Referee: Malkhaz Beuklishvili

21 August 2013	Spartaki-Tskhinvali Tbilisi	4 – 1	Chiatura	Tbilisi
17:00 (GET)	Burdzenadze 15'; Tukhareli 44'; Megrelishvili 54'; Metreveli 89'	Report	Khatchiperadze 89'	Stadium: Mikheil Meskhi Stadium; Attendance: 100; Referee: Girogi Kruashvili

22 August 2013	Metalurgi Rustavi	2 – 0	Gagra	Rustavi
17:00 (GET)	Beriashvili 53', 73'	Report		Stadium: Poladi Stadium; Attendance: 300; Referee: Lasha Silagava

22 August 2013	Dinamo Batumi	6 – 0	Mertskhali Ozurgeti	Kobuleti
17:00 (GET)	Tevdoradze 14', 60'; Chimakadze 38', 42', 72'; Abuselidze 78'	Report		Stadium: Chele Arena; Attendance: 200; Referee: Davit Sanodze

22 August 2013	Samgurali Tskaltubo	1 – 2	Kolkheti-1913 Poti	Tsqaltubo
17:00 (GET)	Tevdoradze 89'	Report	Gogonaia 61'; Lemonjava 79'	Stadium: 26 May Stadium; Attendance: 100; Referee: Goga Kikacheishvili

22 August 2013	Sulori Vani	0 – 5	Zestaponi	Vani
19:00 (GET)		Report	Tchanturishvili 37', 78'; Lomia 53'; Kvernadze 63'; Sardalishvili 80'	Stadium: Grigol Nikoleishvili Stadium; Attendance: 1000; Referee: Jener Khorava

=== Second legs ===
5 September 2013	Chiatura	2 – 3 (3–7 agg.)	Spartaki-Tskhinvali Tbilisi	Chiatura
16:00 (GET)	Tsertsvadze 11' (o.g.); Bablidze 81'	Report	Metreveli 56'; Makatsaria 66'; Pantskhava 80'	Stadium: Temur Maghradze Stadium; Attendance: 100; Referee: Malkhaz Beuklishvili

17 September 2013	Locomotive Tbilisi	3 – 1 (5–2 agg.)	Algeti Marneuli	Tbilisi
11:00 (GET)	Bakradze 55'; Kvartskhelia 80'; Arabidze 83'	Report	Mosiashvili 69'	Stadium: Mikheil Meskhi Stadium; Attendance: 50; Referee: Bakur Ninua

17 September 2013	Gagra	1 – 1 (1–3 agg.)	Metalurgi Rustavi	Gori
15:30 (GET)	Seun 88' (pen.)	Report	Sajaia 53'	Stadium: Merani Stadium; Attendance: 200; Referee: Tornike Gvantseladze

17 September 2013	Khobi	2 – 1 (a.e.t.) (3–2 agg.)	Baia Zugdidi	Khobi
15:30 (GET)	Bukia 38'; Gergaia 109'	Report	Guguchia 66' (pen.)	Stadium: Tsentraluri Stadioni; Attendance: 500; Referee: Aleksandr Kritchashvili

17 September 2013	Kolkheti-1913 Poti	1 – 0 (3–1 agg.)	Samgurali Tskaltubo	Poti
15:30 (GET)	Krasovski 74'	Report		Stadium: Fazisi Stadium; Attendance: 400; Referee: Temur Khutchua

17 September 2013	Merani Martvili	0 – 0 (4–2 agg.)	Samtredia	Martvili
15:30 (GET)		Report		Stadium: Municipal Stadium; Attendance: 300; Referee: Khvicha Gagnidze

17 September 2013	Mertskhali Ozurgeti	1 – 3 (1–9 agg.)	Dinamo Batumi	Ozurgeti
15:30 (GET)	Khintibidze 73'	Report	Kverenchkhiladze 33', 81'; Abuselidze 69'	Stadium: Megobroba Stadium; Attendance: 200; Referee: Giorgi Dograshvili

17 September 2013	Sapovnela Terjola	2 – 3 (3–8 agg.)	Guria Lanchkhuti	Terjola
15:30 (GET)	Shavgulidze 8'; Deisadze 75'	Report	Chikviladze 31' (pen.); Toronjadze 45+1'; Tcheishvili 60'	Stadium: Tsentraluri Stadioni; Attendance: 200; Referee: Levan Kvaratskhelia

17 September 2013	Skuri Tsalenjikha	1 – 2 (1–3 agg.)	Shukura Kobuleti	Tsalenjikha
15:30 (GET)	Tchkuaseli 64'	Report	Tughushi 62'; Kopaliani 67'	Stadium: Stadioni Sasha Kvaratskhelia; Attendance: 300; Referee: Mamuka Urushadze

17 September 2013	STU Tbilisi	2 – 5 (3–11 agg.)	Sioni Bolnisi	Bolnisi
15:30 (GET)	Jikidze 37' (pen.); Sabadze 53'	Report	Ugulava 7'; Mmadubuike 40'; Mikuchadze 45', 87'; Akhalaia 75'	Stadium: Stadioni Tamaz Stepania; Attendance: 200; Referee: Arsen Nonikashvili

17 September 2013	Zestaponi	5 – 0 (10–0 agg.)	Sulori Vani	Zestaponi
18:00 (GET)	Guruli 42' (pen.), 85'; Jelić 55' (pen.); Kvernadze 87'; Lomia 90'	Report		Stadium: David Abashidze Stadium; Attendance: 300; Referee: Irakli Kvirikashvili

== Second round ==
The winners from the first round went through in this round and to be joined at this stage by Chikhura Sachkhere, Dila Gori, Dinamo Tbilisi and Torpedo Kutaisi. First legs played on 25 September 2013, with the returning leg on 30 October 2013.

Team 1	Agg.	Team 2	1st leg	2nd leg
Locomotive Tbilisi (2)	0–7	Chikhura Sachkhere (1)	0–3	0–4
Khobi (2)	0–15	Dinamo Tbilisi (1)	0–9	0–6
Metalurgi Rustavi (1)	5–1	Kolkheti-1913 Poti (2)	2–0	3–1
Sioni Bolnisi (1)	2–0	Zestaponi (1)	1–0	1–0
Dila Gori (1)	2–2	Dinamo Batumi (2)	1–0	1–2
Guria Lanchkhuti (1)	2–3	Merani Martvili (1)	1–2	1–1
Torpedo Kutaisi (1)	4–4 (6–5 p)	Spartaki-Tskhinvali Tbilisi (1)	2–2	2–2
Shukura Kobuleti (2)	2–2	WIT Georgia (1)	1–0	1–2

== Quarter final ==
First legs played on 22 February 2014, with the returning leg on 20 March 2014.

Team 1	Agg.	Team 2	1st leg	2nd leg
Metalurgi Rustavi (1)	1–6	Dinamo Tbilisi (1)	0–2	1–4
Sioni Bolnisi (1)	2–3	Chikhura Sachkhere (1)	1–1	1–2
Torpedo Kutaisi (1)	1–4	Dila Gori (1)	1–2	0–2
Shukura Kobuleti (2)	2–2 (a)	Merani Martvili (1)	0–0	2–2

=== First legs ===
22 February 2014	Sioni Bolnisi (1)	1–1	Chikhura Sachkhere (1)	Tamaz Stepania Stadium, Bolnisi
14:00 GET	Z. Lobjanidze 54'	Report	L. Khmaladze 72' (pen.)	Referee: Tornike Gvantseladze

22 February 2014	Metalurgi Rustavi (1)	0–2	Dinamo Tbilisi (1)	Poladi Stadium, Rustavi
14:00 GET		Report		Referee: George Vadatchkoria

22 February 2014	Shukura Kobuleti (2)	0–0	Merani Martvili (1)	Chele Arena, Kobuleti
14:00 GET		Report		Referee: Levan Kvaratskhelia

22 February 2014	Torpedo Kutaisi (1)	1–2	Dila Gori (1)	Givi Kiladze Stadium, Kutaisi
14:00 GET		Report		Referee: Davit Kharitonashvili

=== Second legs ===
20 March 2014	Chikhura Sachkhere (1)	2–1 (3–2 agg.)	Sioni Bolnisi (1)	Central Stadium, Sachkhere
11:30 GET		Summary

20 March 2014	Dila Gori (1)	2–0 (4–1 agg.)	Torpedo Kutaisi (1)	Tengiz Burjanadze Stadium, Gori
11:30 GET		Summary

20 March 2014	Merani Martvili (1)	2–2 (2–2a agg.)	Shukura Kobuleti (2)	Municipal Stadium, Martvili
11:30 GET		Summary

20 March 2014	Dinamo Tbilisi (1)	4–1 (6–1 agg.)	Metalurgi Rustavi (1)	Dinamo Arena, Tbilisi
15:00 GET		Summary		Referee: George Vadatchkoria

== Semi-final ==
Team 1	Agg.	Team 2	1st leg	2nd leg
Shukura Kobuleti (2)	2–5	Chikhura Sachkhere (1)	1–2	1–3
Dinamo Tbilisi (1)	5–2	Dila Gori (1)	1–0	4–2

=== First legs ===
8 April 2014	Shukura Kobuleti (2)	1–2	Chikhura Sachkhere (1)	Chele Arena, Kobuleti
16:00 GET		Report

8 April 2014	Dinamo Tbilisi (1)	1–0	Dila Gori (1)	Dinamo Arena, Tbilisi
18:00 GET		Report

=== Second legs ===
23 April 2014	Chikhura Sachkhere (1)	3–1 (5–2 agg.)	Shukura Kobuleti (2)	Central Stadium, Sachkhere
16:00 GET	Kimadze 38'; Odikadze 72' (pen.); Kvaskhvadze 77'		Tsenteradze 84'

23 April 2014	Dila Gori (1)	2–4 (2–5 agg.)	Dinamo Tbilisi (1)	Tengiz Burjanadze Stadium, Gori
16:00 GET	Bolkvadze 85'; Koshkadze 90'		Rekhviashvili 22'; Martsvaladze 59', 70'; Merebashvili 68'

== Final ==
21 May 2014
19:00 UTC+4

Dinamo Tbilisi (1)	2–1	Chikhura Sachkhere (1)
Xisco 22'; Martsvaladze 59'; Rekhviashvili (red card) 20'		Datunaishvili 49'

Mikheil Meskhi Stadium, Tbilisi
Attendance: 5,000
Referee: Tornike Gvantseladze

== See also ==
- 2013–14 Umaglesi Liga
- 2013–14 Pirveli Liga
