= 2015–16 Georgian Cup =

Tournament details
- Country: Georgia
- Dates: 17 August 2015 – 18 May 2016
- Teams: 28

Final positions
- Champions: Dinamo Tbilisi
- Runners-up: Sioni Bolnisi

Tournament statistics
- Matches played: 53
- Goals scored: 130 (2.45 per match)

The 2015–16 Georgian Cup (also known as the David Kipiani Cup) was the seventy-third season overall and the twenty-sixth since independence of the Georgian annual football tournament. The competition began on 17 August 2015 and finished on 18 May 2016.

The defending champions are Dinamo Tbilisi, after winning their twelfth Georgian Cup last season. The winner of the competition qualified for the first qualifying round of the 2016–17 UEFA Europa League.

== First round ==
The first legs were held on 17 and 18 August, with the return matches held 25 and 26 August.

=== First legs ===
17 August 2015 1	Chikhura Sachkhere (1)	1–0	FC Mertskhali Ozurgeti (2)	Ivantsminda
	Mumladze 14'			Stadium: Tsentraluri Stadioni; Referee: Boris Glushchuki

17 August 2015 1	Liakhvi Achabeti (2)	1–0	Locomotive Tbilisi (1)	Gori
	Lomashvili 12'			Stadium: Tengiz Burjanadze Stadium; Attendance: 200; Referee: Bakur Ninua

17 August 2015 1	Saburtalo Tbilisi (1)	0–2	WIT Georgia (2)	Tbilisi
			Matiashvili 20'; Ghirdaladze 90+2'	Stadium: Stadioni Bendela; Referee: Jener Khorava

18 August 2015 1	Betlemi Keda (2)	1–2	Shukura Kobuleti (1)	Keda
	Darchidze 54' (pen.)		Lobjanidze 26', 45+1'	Stadium: Tsentraluri Stadioni; Attendance: 100; Referee: Giorgi Dograshvili

18 August 2015 1	Sioni Bolnisi (1)	0–0	Rustavi (2)	Bolnisi
				Stadium: Tamaz Stepania Stadium; Attendance: 500; Referee: Giorgi Avazashvili

18 August 2015 1	Chkherimela Kharagauli (2)	1–2	Torpedo Kutaisi (1)	Kharagauli
	Vekua 83' (pen.)		Babunashvili 15'; Kapanadze 41'	Stadium: Soso Abashidze Stadium; Attendance: 300; Referee: Papuna Matcharadze

18 August 2015 1	Guria Lanchkhuti (1)	7–0	Samegrelo Chkhorotsku (2)	Lanchkhuti
	Tsilosani 8'; Chapidze 38', 61'; Nozadze 64', 84'; Maisuradze 69'; Bakhia 82'			Stadium: Evgrapi Shevardnadze Stadium; Attendance: 200; Referee: Khvicha Gagnidze

18 August 2015 1	FC Khobi (2)	1–2	FC Sapovnela Terjola (1)	Khobi
	Gergaia 1'		Alavidze 13'; Bukhaidze 45'	Stadium: Tsentraluri Stadioni; Attendance: 300; Referee: Abdullah Baslehlo (Syria)

18 August 2015 1	Merani Martvili (1)	0–1	FC Chiatura (2)	Martvili
			Khatchiperadze 73'	Stadium: Tsentraluri Stadioni; Attendance: 150; Referee: Giorgi Vardidze

18 August 2015 1	Kolkheti Poti (1)	2–0	Meshakhte Tkibuli (2)	Poti
	Sitchinava 33'; Gogonaia 78' (pen.)			Stadium: Fazisi Stadium; Attendance: 500; Referee: Davit Sanodze

18 August 2015 1	FC Samtredia (1)	2–0	Matchakhela Khelvachauri (2)	Samtredia
	Sikharulidze 19'; Sandokhadze 37'			Stadium: Erosi Manjgaladze Stadium; Attendance: 300; Referee: Shota Kukhilava

18 August 2015 1	FC Zugdidi (1)	2–1	Imereti Khoni (3)	Zugdidi
	Samushia 34'; Pipia 79'		Giorgobiani 59'	Stadium: Baias satsvrtneli Baza; Attendance: 250; Referee: Zviad Tughushi

=== Second legs ===
25 August 2015 1	WIT Georgia (2)	1–1 (3–1 agg.)	FC Saburtalo Tbilisi (1)	Mtskheta
	Kakhabrishvili 43'		Rukhadze 35'	Stadium: Mtskheta Park; Referee: Giorgi Avazashvili

26 August 2015 1	Torpedo Kutaisi (1)	4–0 (6–1 agg.)	Chkherimela Kharagauli (2)	Kutaisi
	Kapanadze 56', 87'; Kukhianidze 64' (pen.); Kirkitadze 67'			Stadium: Tsentraluri Stadioni; Attendance: 700; Referee: Davit Sanodze

26 August 2015 1	Rustavi (2)	1–1 (1–1 agg.)	Sioni Bolnisi (1)	Rustavi
	Beruashvili 53'		Beruashvili 4' (o.g.)	Stadium: Poladi Stadium; Attendance: 500; Referee: Khvicha Gagnidze

26 August 2015 1	Meshakhte Tkibuli (2)	0–2 (0–4 agg.)	Kolkheti Poti (1)	Tkibuli
			Gongadze 13', 25'	Stadium: Stadioni Vladimer Bochorishvili; Attendance: 300; Referee: Shota Kukhilava

26 August 2015 1	Matchakhela Khelvachauri (2)	0–3 (0–5 agg.)	FC Samtredia (1)	Khelvachauri
			Akhaladze 38'; Zivzivadze 54', 65'	Stadium: Tsentraluri Stadioni; Attendance: 200; Referee: Papuna Matcharadze

26 August 2015 1	Locomotive Tbilisi (1)	0–2 (0–3 agg.)	Liakhvi Achabeti (2)	Saguramo
			Lomia 38'; Lomashvili 69'	Stadium: Saguramos sapekhburto kompleksi Attendance: 100; Referee: Jener Khorava

26 August 2015 1	Imereti Khoni (2)	0–0 (1–2 agg.)	FC Zugdidi (1)	Martvili
				Stadium: Tsentraluri Stadioni; Attendance: 200; Referee: Giorgi Dograshvili

26 August 2015 1	Samegrelo Chkhorotsku (2)	1–1 (1–8 agg.)	Guria Lanchkhuti (1)	Chkhorotsqu
	Deisadze 58'		Nozadze 54'	Stadium: Chkhorotskus Tsentraluri Stadioni; Attendance: 500; Referee: Giorgi Vardidze

26 August 2015 1	Shukura Kobuleti (1)	4–3 (6–4 agg.)	Betlemi Keda (2)	Kobuleti
	Getsadze 20', 78' (pen.); Kakaladze 60'; Lobjanidze 89'		Kakhiani 8'; Darchidze 82', 85' (pen.)	Stadium: Chele Arena; Attendance: 300; Referee: Zviad Tughushi

26 August 2015 1	Sapovnela Terjola (1)	6–1 (8–2 agg.)	FC Khobi (2)	Terjola
	Alavidze 39'; Tskipurishvili 45'; Bukhaidze 56', 69' (pen.), 85'; Tkeshelashvili 88'		Bakuradze 19'	Stadium: Tsentraluri Stadioni; Attendance: 300; Referee: Lasha Silagava

26 August 2015 1	FC Chiatura (2)	1–1 (2–1 agg.)	Merani Martvili (1)	Chiatura
	Nadiradze 60'		Tsotsonava 17'	Stadium: Stadioni Temur Maghradze; Attendance: 400; Referee: Davit Kharitonashvili

26 August 2015 1	Mertskhali Ozurgeti (2)	0–4 (0–5 agg.)	Chikhura Sachkhere (1)	Ozurgeti
			Sardalishvili 22'; Dekanoidze 43'; Jokhadze 54', 84'	Stadium: Munitsipaluri Tsentraluri Stadioni; Attendance: 200; Referee: Irakli Kvirikashvili

== Second round ==
The first legs were held on 16 September, with the return matches held 27 and 28 October.

=== First legs ===
16 September 2015 2	Shukura Kobuleti (1)	3–1	FC Tskhinvali (1)	Kobuleti
	Chaladze 24'; Guguchia 60'; Chelebadze 72'		Lekvtadze 2'	Stadium: Chele Arena; Attendance: 300; Referee: Goga Kikacheishvili

16 September 2015 2	Guria Lanchkhuti (1)	0–2	Sioni Bolnisi (1)	Lanchkhuti
			Mikaberidze 15'; Mandzhgaladze 90'	Stadium: Evgrapi Shevardnadze Stadium; Attendance: 300; Referee: Giorgi Dograshvili

16 September 2015 2	Dinamo Tbilisi (1)	1–0	Kolkheti Poti (1)	Tbilisi
	Jaba 39'			Stadium: Boris Paichadze Dinamo Arena; Attendance: 500; Referee: Levan Kvaratskhelia

16 September 2015 2	FC Samtredia (1)	3–0	Liakhvi Achabeti (2)	Samtredia
	Shergelashvili 29'; Razhamashvili 49'; Markozashvili 90+3'			Stadium: Erosi Manjgaladze Stadium; Attendance: 1 000; Referee: Arsen Nonikashvili

16 September 2015 2	Dila Gori (1)	1–2	FC Zugdidi (1)	Gori
	Modebadze 58'		Bulia 32'; Tutberidze 90+2'	Stadium: Tengiz Burjanadze Stadium; Attendance: 1 000; Referee: Baken Ninua

16 September 2015 2	WIT Georgia (2)	3–2	Dinamo Batumi (1)	Mtskheta
	Kakhabrishvili 13'; Khabelashvili 57'; Lebanidze 63'		Tevdoradze 10'; Luis Alberto 78'	Stadium: Mtskheta Park; Attendance: 100; Referee: Khvicha Gagnidze

16 September 2015 2	FC Chiatura (2)	0–1	Torpedo Kutaisi (1)	Chiatura
			Kirkitadze 73'	Stadium: Temur Maghradze Stadium; Attendance: 300; Referee: David Sanodze

16 September 2015 2	Sapovnela Terjola (1)	0–2	Chikhura Sachkhere (1)	Ivantsminda
			Sardalishvili 20'; Tchankotadze 89'	Stadium: Tsentraluri Stadioni; Attendance: 200; Referee: Papuna Matcharadze

=== Second legs ===
27 October 2015 2	FC Tskhinvali (1)	1–1 (2–4 agg.)	Shukura Kobuleti (1)	Tbilisi
	Katcharava 64'		Uridia 83'	Stadium: Mikheil Meskhis Sakhelobis Stadionis Satadarigo Moedani; Attendance: 200; Referee: Irakli Kvirikashvili

27 October 2015 2	Sioni Bolnisi (1)	1–1 (3–1 agg.)	Guria Lanchkhuti (1)	Rustavi
	Sajaia 53'		Tsereteli 68'	Stadium: Poladi Stadium; Attendance: 200; Referee: Giorgi Avazashvili

27 October 2015 2	Kolkheti Poti (1)	0–1 (0–2 agg.)	Dinamo Tbilisi (1)	Lanchkhuti
			Kvilitaia 12'	Stadium: Evgrapi Shevardnadze Stadium; Attendance: 200; Referee: Jener Khorava

27 October 2015 2	Liakhvi Achabeti (2)	1–4 (1–7 agg.)	FC Samtredia (1)	Gori
	Ghibradze 65'		Markozashvili 10', 40'; Kvaratskhelia 60', 90'	Stadium: Tengiz Burjanadze Stadium; Attendance: 150; Referee: Shota Kukhilava

27 October 2015 2	FC Zugdidi (1)	0–1 (2–2 agg.)	Dila Gori (1)	Zugdidi
			Eristavi 31'	Stadium: Baias satsvrtneli Baza; Attendance: 500; Referee: Goga Kikacheishvili

27 October 2015 2	Dinamo Batumi (1)	0–1 (2–4 agg.)	WIT Georgia (2)	Kobuleti
			Kakhabrishvili 43'	Stadium: Chele Arena; Attendance: 350; Referee: Bakur Ninua

27 October 2015 2	Torpedo Kutaisi (1)	6–1 (7–1 agg.)	FC Chiatura (2)	Kutaisi
	Kakheshvili 10'; Kukhianidze 41'; Tchitchinadze 48'; Bobghiashvili 58' (o.g.); Sitchinava 70'; Nergadze 90'		Kutchashvili 79'	Stadium: Tsentraluri Stadioni; Attendance: 500; Referee: Papuna Matcharadze

28 October 2015 2	Chikhura Sachkhere (1)	0–0 (2–0 agg.)	Sapovnela Terjola (1)	Ivantsminda
				Stadium: Tsentraluri Stadioni; Attendance: 200; Referee: Khvicha Gagnidze

== Quarterfinals ==
The first legs were held on 2 December 2015 with the return matches held 16 December 2015.

=== First legs ===
2 December 2015	FC Samtredia (1)	0–0	Sioni Bolnisi (1)	Samtredia
				Stadium: Erosi Manjgaladze Stadium; Attendance: 1 000; Referee: Arsen Nonikashvili

2 December 2015	FC Zugdidi (1)	1–0	WIT Georgia (2)	Zugdidi
	Lashkia 36'			Stadium: Baias satsvrtneli Baza; Attendance: 300; Referee: Irakli Kvirikashvili

2 December 2015	Chikhura Sachkhere (1)	2–0	Shukura Kobuleti (1)	Ivantsminda
	Sardalishvili 11'; Tchetchelashvili 29'			Stadium: Tsentraluri Stadioni; Attendance: 250; Referee: Davit Kharitonashvili

2 December 2015	Torpedo Kutaisi (1)	0–1	Dinamo Tbilisi (1)	Kutaisi
			Kvilitaia 78'	Stadium: Tsentraluri Stadioni; Attendance: 2 000; Referee: Jener Khorava

=== Second legs ===
16 December 2015	Sioni Bolnisi (1)	0–0 (a.e.t.) (0–0 agg.) (2–0 p)	FC Samtredia (1)	Bolnisi
				Stadium: Tamaz Stepania Stadium; Attendance: 2 000; Referee: Jener Khorava
	Penalties
	Isiani (penalty scored); Kilasonia (penalty missed); Manjgaladze (penalty scored)		Markozashvili (penalty missed); Razhamashvili (penalty missed); Datunaishvili (penalty missed); Sikharulidze (penalty missed)

16 December 2015	WIT Georgia (2)	1–0 (a.e.t.) (1–1 agg.) (5–3 p)	FC Zugdidi (1)	Mtskheta
	Kurdghelashvili 43'			Stadium: Mtskheta Park; Attendance: 150; Referee: Giorgi Kruashvili
	Penalties
	Penalty scored		Penalty scored Penalty missed

16 December 2015	Shukura Kobuleti (1)	1–1 (1–3 agg.)	Chikhura Sachkhere (1)	Kobuleti
	Lobjanidze 84'		Dekanoidze 72'	Stadium: Chele Arena; Attendance: 500; Referee: George Vadatchkoria

16 December 2015	Dinamo Tbilisi (1)	2–1 (3–1 agg.)	Torpedo Kutaisi (1)	Tbilisi
	Kvilitaia 18'; Tsintsadze 71' (pen.)		Saghrishvili 49'	Stadium: Boris Paichadze Dinamo Arena; Attendance: 500; Referee: Lasha Silagava

== Semi-finals ==
The first legs were held on 20 April 2016 with the return matches held 5 May 2016.

=== First legs ===
20 April 2016	WIT Georgia (2)	2–2	Sioni Bolnisi (1)	Mtskheta
	Vazagashvili 45+1'; Ghirdaladze 47'		Luis Alberto 21'; Tatanashvili 72'	Stadium: Mtskheta Park; Attendance: 300; Referee: George Vadatchkoria

20 April 2016	Dinamo Tbilisi (1)	3–0	Chikhura Sachkhere (1)	Tbilisi
	Tchanturishvili 15'; Jighauri 58'; Kvilitaia 62'			Stadium: Mtskheta Park; Attendance: 1 500; Referee: Lasha Silagava

=== Second legs ===
5 May 2016	Sioni Bolnisi (1)	3–1 (5–3 agg.)	WIT Georgia (2)	Bolnisi
	Tatanashvili 18' (pen.), 30', 87'		Kurdghelashvili 71' (pen.)	Stadium: Tamaz Stepania Stadium; Attendance: 800; Referee: George Vadatchkoria

5 May 2016	Chikhura Sachkhere (1)	1–2 (1–5 agg.)	Dinamo Tbilisi (1)	Ivantsminda
	Dekanoidze 31'		Kvilitaia 67'; Guruli 90'	Stadium: Tsentraluri Stadioni; Attendance: 300; Referee: Lasha Silagava

== Final ==
Final match were held on 18 May 2016 in Kutaisi. That was the first final which was played outside Tbilisi.

18 May 2016
19:00

Sioni Bolnisi (1)	0–1	Dinamo Tbilisi (1)
		Chanturishvili 29'

Ramaz Shengelia Stadium, Kutaisi
Attendance: 8,000
Referee: Giorgi Kruashvili

== See also ==
- 2015–16 Umaglesi Liga
- 2015–16 Pirveli Liga
