= FC Odishi 1919 =

- Full name: FC Odishi 1919
- Ground: Ganmukhuri Central stadium
- Capacity: 2,000
- Owner: 812 Kapitali ltd
- Chairman: Khvicha Akubardia
- Manager: Makar Akubardia
- League: Erovnuli Liga 2
- 2025: 3rd of 16 (promoted)
- Website: fcodishi1919.ge

FC Odishi 1919 (Georgian: საფეხბურთო კლუბი ოდიში 1919), commonly referred to as simply Odishi, is a Georgian association football club based in Zugdidi, the administrative centre of Samegrelo-Zemo Svaneti. They compete in Erovnuli Liga 2, the 2nd tier of Georgian football, after gaining promotion from Liga 3 in 2025.

== History ==
On 20 May 1919, two students of Zugdidi gymnasium, Leo Chedia and Pier Kobakhidze, organized a first football match in the city with Mertskhali (Swallows) represented as a local team. This date is considered a birthday for football in Zugdidi.

The main football club of the city has had various names, especially after 1990, and as Dinamo Zugdidi, Odishi, Zugdidi, Baia, and Mglebi has taken part in the Umaglesi Liga in different seasons.

Lazika Zugdidi, the predecessor of Odishi 1919, competed in lower divisions in the early 2010s. Despite being the third division leaders for most of the 2012/13 season, at the end they lost a promotion chance. A year later, though, the team remained unstoppable until a place in Pirveli Liga was booked.

The debutants of the second division performed remarkably well to join the battle for a promotion spot. The club slipped up at the very end again, losing three games in a row in the last five matches, which allowed Locomotive Tbilisi to claim a second place paving the way for play-offs. Still, the third place in 2014–15 in Liga 2 has been the best result shown by Lazika.

With another promotion set as their goal, the club started the next season. But its first phase turned out so awful that the manager and some key players were axed. Ukrainian manager Sergey Zhitski as well as forward Levan Kutalia were invited. In the same season Lazika was introduced as Odishi 1919. As the manager pointed out, while taking this decision a special emphasis was given to the history of football in Zugdidi.

Soon a sharp decline followed, which resulted in two successive relegations. Left out of a national league for the first time, Odishi finished as runners-up in their regional league group in 2018 and joined the newly formed Liga 4 for the next season.

Their tenure in the fourth tier lasted six years. In contrast with the initial less ambitious four seasons, during the 2023 season Odishi were regarded as title contenders, but they took fourth place only three points below their nearest rivals. Being the only 4th division club with a foreign coach, Odishi set to accomplish the same goal in 2024 and even though went through some mid-season changes in the management, the team sealed promotion with four games still in hand.

A year later, Odishi 1919 continued their successful campaign in the 3rd tier. Following a 4–3 aggregate victory over Iberia B in playoffs, the team under head coach Makar Akubardia achieved back-to-back promotions to return to the 2nd division after a nine-year absence.

== Seasons ==
Year	League	Pos	M	W	D	L	GF–GA	Pts	Notes
2012/13	Meore Liga West	2_{/13}	24	18	3	3	71–16	57	
2013/14	Meore Liga West	1_{/13}	24	18	2	4	67–19	56	Promoted
2014/15	Pirveli Liga Group A	3_{/10}	36	20	6	10	69–41	66	
2015/16	Pirveli Liga	7_{/18}	34	14	6	14	52–58	48	
2016	Pirveli Liga Group Red	8_{/9}	16	7	1	8	31–32	16*	* -6 points; Relegated
2017	Liga 3 Red Group	9_{/10}	18	3	5	10	13–27	14	Relegated
2017	Relegation round	7_{/10}	18	7	3	8	27–31	24	Relegated
2018	Regionuli Liga, Group West	2_{/8}	14	8	3	3	27–15	27	Promoted
2019	Liga 4	7_{/10}	27	8	5	14	42–46	29	
2020	Liga 4 Red Group	6_{/8}	14	5	4	5	21–17	19	
2021	Liga 4 White Group	6_{/10}	18	9	2	7	29–32	29	
2021	Relegation Round	1_{/10}	18	13	1	4	36–25	40	
2022	Liga 4	11_{/16}	30	10	6	14	41–43	36	
2023	Liga 4	4_{/14}	26	14	7	5	44–32	36	
2024	Liga 4	3_{/15}	28	20	1	7	87–34	61	Promoted
2025	Liga 3	3_{/16}	30	20	4	6	59–19	64	Promoted (Note: Beat Iberia 1999 B 4–3 on aggregate in Liga 2/3 playoffs)

== Current squad ==
As of 26 July 2026

Note: Flags indicate national team as defined under FIFA eligibility rules; some limited exceptions apply. Players may hold more than one non-FIFA nationality.

No.	Pos.	Nation	Player
1	GK	SVK	Matej Weiss
2	DF	GEO	Roman Chachua
3	DF	GEO	Saba Sidamonidze
4	DF	TOG	Ayatoulaye Akondo
5	MF	SRB	Aleksa Batos
7	MF	GEO	Nika Kitia
8	MF	GEO	Zviad Sikharulia
9	FW	GEO	Giorgi Gabedava
10	MF	GEO	Nodar Kavtaradze
11	MF	GEO	Mate Antia
13	MF	GEO	Luka Koberidze
15	DF	GEO	Mikheil Chkopoia
16	DF	GEO	Giorgi Akhaladze
17	MF	GEO	Giorgi Jaburia

No.	Pos.	Nation	Player
18	FW	GEO	Otar Kvernadze
19	FW	GEO	Levan Kutalia (C)
20	FW	GEO	Bakur Jinjolava
21	DF	GEO	Temur Gognadze
22	MF	UKR	Sergiy Lebedev
24	DF	GEO	Nikoloz Chartia
25	GK	GEO	Robert Imerlishvili
26	FW	GEO	Davit Gabisonia
29	DF	GBS	Mohamed Sylla
30	GK	GEO	Luka Lejava
33	MF	GEO	Sandro Toloraia
37	FW	GEO	Davit Dagargulia
39	DF	GEO	Saba Chkadua
40	FW	GEO	Arvelod Khunjgurua

== Managerial history ==
Name	Nat.	From	To
Tengiz Katsia	(Georgia (country))	2019	2019
Elguja Kometiani	(Georgia (country))	2019	2020
Besik Sherozia	(Georgia (country))	2020	2023
Makar Akubardia (interim)	(Georgia (country))	2023	2023
Anatoliy Piskovets	(Ukraine)	2023	2024
Makar Akubardia	(Georgia (country))	2024	2026
Kakhaber Kacharava	(Georgia (country))	2026	2026
Makar Akubardia	(Georgia (country))	2026	

== Stadium ==
The club currently holds home games at the Ganmukhuri central stadium. Located in 25 km from Zugdidi, it has the capacity of 2,000.

== Name ==
As an old name for Samegrelo, the term Odishi was widely applied in medieval times.
