= Eric Pimentel =

Brazilian footballer (born 2003)

Personal information
- Full name: Eric Lima Pimentel
- Date of birth: 15 January 2003 (age 23)
- Place of birth: Rio de Janeiro, Brazil
- Height: 1.90 m (6 ft 3 in)
- Position: Centre-back

Team information
- Current team: Meshakhte Tkibuli (on loan from Torpedo Kutaisi)
- Number: 31

Youth career
- 2015–2023: Vasco da Gama

Senior career*
Years	Team	Apps	(Gls)
2023	Vasco da Gama	1	(0)
2023–2024	Porto B	3	(0)
2025–	Torpedo Kutaisi	14	(0)
2026–	→ Meshakhte (loan)	13	(1)
- * Club domestic league appearances and goals as of 10 July 2026

Eric Lima Pimentel (born 15 January 2003) is a Brazilian professional footballer who plays as a centre-back for Georgian Erovnuli Liga club Meshakhte Tkibuli.

== Club career ==
Eric Pimentel joined the academy of Vasco da Gama at the end of 2015. He went on to win a number of accolades at youth level, before making his debut in January 2023. His performances in the youth teams of Vasco da Gama drew the attention of Spanish sides Villarreal, Real Valladolid and Granada.

On 10 July, Portuguese side Porto announced the free signing of Pimentel, after his contract with Vasco da Gama had expired. He joined the B team.

In early February 2025, Eric Pimentel joined Georgian top league side Torpedo Kutaisi on a two-year deal.–

== International career ==
Eric Pimentel was called up to the Brazil under-18 squad in February 2021.

== Personal life ==
Eric Pimentel is the son of former Vasco da Gama winger Pimentel, who played for the club between 1991 and 1997.

== Career statistics ==
=== Club ===
As of match played 23 June 2026

Appearances and goals by club, season and competition
Club	Season	League			State league		National cup		Continental		Total	
Club	Season	Division	Apps	Goals	Apps	Goals	Apps	Goals	Apps	Goals	Apps	Goals
Vasco da Gama	2023	Série A	0	0	1 (Note: Appearance(s) in Campeonato Carioca)	0	0	0	—		1	0
Porto B	2023–24	Liga Portugal 2	0	0	—		—		—		0	0
Torpedo	2025	Erovnuli Liga	14	0	—		1	0	—		15	0
Meshakhte	2026	Erovnuli Liga	13	1	—		—		—		13	1
Career total			27	1	1	0	1	0	0	0	29	1
