= Giorgi Kvilitaia =

Georgian footballer

Personal information
- Date of birth: 1 October 1993 (age 33)
- Place of birth: Abasha, Georgia
- Height: 1.91 m (6 ft 3 in)
- Position: Forward

Team information
- Current team: Holstein Kiel
- Number: 9

Senior career*
| Years | Team | Apps | (Gls) |
| 2012–2013 | Sasco Tbilisi | 16 | (22) |
| 2013–2015 | Győr | 13 | (1) |
| 2013–2014 | → Dila Gori (loan) | 18 | (6) |
| 2015–2016 | Dinamo Tbilisi | 29 | (24) |
| 2016–2018 | Rapid Wien | 55 | (17) |
| 2018–2021 | KAA Gent | 34 | (5) |
| 2020−2021 | → Anorthosis (loan) | 31 | (14) |
| 2021−2024 | APOEL | 83 | (26) |
| 2024–2026 | Aris Limassol | 43 | (12) |
| 2026 | Metz | 10 | (2) |
| 2026– | Holstein Kiel | 2 | (0) |

International career^{‡}
| 2013–2014 | Georgia U21 | 6 | (1) |
| 2016– | Georgia | 43 | (7) |
- * Club domestic league appearances and goals as of 9 October 2026 ‡ National team caps and goals as of 22:50, 2 June 2026 (UTC)

Giorgi Kvilitaia (Order of Honor) (Georgian: გიორგი ქვილითაია, romanized: giorgi kvilitaia, pronounced [ɡioɾɡi kʰʷilitʰaia], born 1 October 1993) is a Georgian professional footballer who plays as a forward for German 2. Bundesliga club Holstein Kiel and the Georgia national team.

== Career ==
Kvilitaia was born in Abasha, Georgia. At age 14 he moved to Tbilisi, first to Norchi Dinamo and later to Division 2 side Sasco, where he was one of the best scorers in 2012–13.

After a year at Győr, Kvilitaia played one season for Dila Gori on loan. In June 2015 he joined Dinamo Tbilisi. With 24 goals scored in 29 matches this season, Kvilitaia became a top scorer and won the special prize at a GFF award ceremony.

In 2016 Kvilitaia signed for Austrian Bundesliga club Rapid Wien.

After two seasons he signed a four-year deal with Belgian side KAA Gent.

Since 2020 Kvilitaia has been playing in the Cypriot First Division. Initially, on 17 September 2020 he joined Anorthosis on loan from Gent and a year later he moved to APOEL on 3 June 2021. In August 2021, he was selected as a team captain. In May 2024, Kvilitaia became the winner of the league season with this club and shortly joined Aris Limassol on a three-year deal.

On 2 February 2026, Kvilitaia signed with Metz in France.

On 29 June 2026, Kvilitaia moved to German club Holstein Kiel on a one-season contract.

== Career statistics ==
=== Club ===
As of 17 May 2026

Appearances and goals by club, season and competition
| Club | Season | League | | | National cup | | League cup | | Continental | | Other | | Total | |
| Club | Season | Division | Apps | Goals | Apps | Goals | Apps | Goals | Apps | Goals | Apps | Goals | Apps | Goals |
|---|---|---|---|---|---|---|---|---|---|---|---|---|---|---|
| Győr | 2012–13 | Nemzeti Bajnokság I | 2 | 0 | 0 | 0 | 1 | 1 | — | | — | | 3 | 1 |
| Győr | 2014–15 | Nemzeti Bajnokság I | 11 | 1 | 1 | 0 | 4 | 9 | — | | — | | 16 | 0 |
| Győr | Total | | 13 | 1 | 1 | 0 | 5 | 10 | — | | — | | 19 | 11 |
| Dila Gori (loan) | 2013–14 | Erovnuli Liga | 18 | 6 | 3 | 0 | — | | — | | — | | 21 | 6 |
| Dinamo Tbilisi | 2015–16 | Erovnuli Liga | 29 | 24 | 7 | 5 | — | | 2 | 0 | 1 | 0 | 39 | 29 |
| Dinamo Tbilisi | 2016–17 | Erovnuli Liga | 0 | 0 | 0 | 0 | — | | 2 | 1 | — | | 2 | 1 |
| Dinamo Tbilisi | Total | | 29 | 24 | 7 | 5 | — | | 4 | 1 | 1 | 0 | 41 | 30 |
| Rapid Wien | 2016–17 | Austrian Bundesliga | 26 | 7 | 4 | 1 | — | | 5 | 1 | — | | 35 | 9 |
| Rapid Wien | 2017–18 | Austrian Bundesliga | 29 | 10 | 3 | 3 | — | | — | | — | | 32 | 13 |
| Rapid Wien | Total | | 55 | 17 | 7 | 4 | — | | 5 | 1 | — | | 67 | 22 |
| Gent | 2018–19 | Belgian Pro League | 11 | 4 | 1 | 0 | — | | 1 | 0 | — | | 13 | 4 |
| Gent | 2019–20 | Belgian Pro League | 23 | 1 | 2 | 2 | — | | 8 | 0 | — | | 33 | 3 |
| Gent | Total | | 34 | 5 | 3 | 2 | — | | 9 | 0 | — | | 46 | 7 |
| Anorthosis (loan) | 2020–21 | Cypriot First Division | 31 | 14 | 5 | 0 | — | | 1 | 1 | — | | 37 | 15 |
| APOEL | 2021–22 | Cypriot First Division | 23 | 10 | 3 | 3 | — | | — | | — | | 26 | 13 |
| APOEL | 2022–23 | Cypriot First Division | 30 | 8 | 3 | 3 | — | | — | | — | | 33 | 11 |
| APOEL | 2023–24 | Cypriot First Division | 30 | 8 | 1 | 0 | — | | 6 | 1 | — | | 37 | 9 |
| APOEL | Total | | 83 | 26 | 7 | 6 | — | | 6 | 1 | — | | 96 | 33 |
| Aris | 2024–25 | Cypriot First Division | 27 | 8 | 1 | 0 | — | | — | | — | | 28 | 8 |
| Aris | 2025–26 | Cypriot First Division | 17 | 5 | 1 | 1 | — | | 4 | 3 | — | | 22 | 9 |
| Aris | Total | | 44 | 13 | 2 | 1 | — | | 4 | 3 | — | | 50 | 17 |
| Metz | 2025–26 | Ligue 1 | 10 | 1 | — | | — | | — | | — | | 10 | 1 |
| Career total | | | 317 | 107 | 35 | 18 | 5 | 10 | 29 | 7 | 1 | 0 | 387 | 142 |

=== International ===
As of matches played on 2 June 2026

Appearances and goals by national team and year
| National team | Year | Apps | Goals |
|---|---|---|---|
| Georgia | 2016 | 4 | 0 |
| Georgia | 2017 | 8 | 3 |
| Georgia | 2018 | 3 | 1 |
| Georgia | 2019 | 8 | 2 |
| Georgia | 2020 | 4 | 0 |
| Georgia | 2021 | 7 | 0 |
| Georgia | 2022 | 1 | 0 |
| Georgia | 2024 | 3 | 0 |
| Georgia | 2025 | 4 | 0 |
| Georgia | 2026 | 1 | 1 |
| Total | | 43 | 7 |

Scores and results list Georgia's goal tally first, score column indicates score after each Kvilitaia goal.

List of international goals scored by Giorgi Kvilitaia
| No. | Date | Venue | Opponent | Score | Result | Competition |
|---|---|---|---|---|---|---|
| 1 | 28 March 2017 | Boris Paichadze Dinamo Arena, Tbilisi, Georgia | Latvia | 2–0 | 5–0 | Friendly |
| 2 | 28 March 2017 | Boris Paichadze Dinamo Arena, Tbilisi, Georgia | Latvia | 3–0 | 5–0 | Friendly |
| 3 | 24 March 2018 | Mikheil Meskhi Stadium, Tbilisi, Georgia | Lithuania | 2–0 | 4–0 | Friendly |
| 4 | 10 November 2017 | Tengiz Burjanadze Stadium, Gori, Georgia | Cyprus | 1–0 | 1–0 | Friendly |
| 5 | 5 September 2019 | Başakşehir Fatih Terim Stadium, Istanbul, Turkey | South Korea | 2–2 | 2–2 | Friendly |
| 6 | 15 October 2019 | Victoria Stadium, Gibraltar | Gibraltar | 3–2 | 3–2 | UEFA Euro 2020 qualification |
| 7 | 2 June 2026 | Mikheil Meskhi Stadium, Tbilisi, Georgia | Romania | 1–0 | 1–1 | Friendly |

== Honours ==
Győr

- Nemzeti Bajnokság I: 2012–13

Dinamo Tbilisi

- Umaglesi Liga: 2015–16
- Georgian Cup: 2015–16
- Georgian Super Cup: 2015–16

Anorthosis

- Cypriot Cup: 2020–21

APOEL

- Cypriot First Division: 2023–24

Individual

- Georgian Umaglesi Liga top scorer: 2015–16
