= Edik Sajaia =

Georgian footballer

Personal information
- Date of birth: 16 February 1981 (age 45)
- Height: 1.78 m (5 ft 10 in)
- Position: Defender

Senior career*
Years	Team	Apps	(Gls)
1996–1997	FC Olimpia Khobi	4	(0)
1997–1998	FC Dinamo-2 Tbilisi	26	(2)
1998–1999	FC Dinamo Tbilisi	1	(0)
1999–2001	FC WIT Georgia	49	(1)
2001–2002	FC Torpedo Moscow	21	(0)
2004	FC Arsenal Tula	34	(0)
2004–2005	FC Lokomotivi Tbilisi	13	(0)
2005–2006	FC Borjomi	12	(4)
2006–2008	FC Zestaponi	19	(1)
2009–2010	FC Anzhi Makhachkala	30	(2)
2010–2011	FC Volga Nizhny Novgorod	25	(2)
2011	FC Khimki	8	(0)
2011–2012	FC Zestaponi	21	(1)
2012–2013	FC Chikhura Sachkhere	19	(2)
2013–2014	FC Sasco	5	(0)
2014–2015	FC Borjomi	4	(1)

International career
1999–2003	Georgia U21	22	(0)
2001–2002	Georgia	9	(0)
- * Club domestic league appearances and goals

Edik Sajaia (Georgian: ედიკ საჯაია; born 16 February 1981) is a Georgian former professional footballer who also holds Russian citizenship.

== Club career ==
He made his debut in the Russian Premier League in 2001 for FC Torpedo Moscow. He played 2 games in the UEFA Cup 2001–02 for FC Torpedo Moscow.
