= Pimentel (footballer) =

Brazilian footballer (born 1972)

Personal information
- Full name: Marcelo Luís Pimentel
- Date of birth: 3 August 1972 (age 54)
- Place of birth: Rio de Janeiro, Brazil
- Height: 1.77 m (5 ft 10 in)
- Positions: Right wing-back; right winger

Youth career
- Vasco da Gama

Senior career*
Years	Team	Apps	(Gls)
1991–1997	Vasco da Gama	252	(24)
1997–1998	Palmeiras	27	(0)
1998–2001	Flamengo	75	(2)
2000	→ São Paulo (loan)	31	(0)
2003	Madureira	6	(0)
2004	Tupi	5	(0)
2006	CENE	3	(0)
- * Club domestic league appearances and goals as of 4 March 2023

Marcelo Luís Pimentel (born 3 August 1972), known simply as Pimentel, is a Brazilian former footballer who played as a right wing-back.

== Club career ==
Born in Rio de Janeiro, Pimentel began his career with Vasco da Gama, debuting in 1991 and winning three consecutive Campeonato Carioca titles in 1992, 1993 and 1994. He transferred to Palmeiras in mid-1997, but was unable to replicate the form that had made him a mainstay at Vasco da Gama, being replaced by Francisco Arce the following season.

== Personal life ==
Pimentel is the father of current Vasco da Gama defender Eric Pimentel.
