= 2015–16 Umaglesi Liga =

Umaglesi Liga
- Season: 2015–16
- Dates: 13 August 2015 – 22 May 2016
- Champions: Dinamo Tbilisi; 16th Georgian title
- Relegated: Sapovnela Terjola; Merani Martvili
- Champions League: Dinamo Tbilisi
- Europa League: Samtredia; Dila Gori; Chikhura Sachkhere
- Matches: 240
- Goals: 668 (2.78 per match)
- Top goalscorer: Giorgi Kvilitaia (24)
- Biggest home win: Samtredia 8–2 Saburtalo Tbilisi (7 March 2016)
- Biggest away win: 3 matches: Sapovnela Terjola 1–5 Dila Gori (7 November 2015); Sapovnela Terjola 1–5 Torpedo Kutaisi (28 November 2015); Merani Martvili 0–4 Dinamo Batumi (12 December 2015)
- Highest scoring: Samtredia 8–2 Saburtalo Tbilisi (7 March 2016)
- Longest winning run: Dinamo Tbilisi (5)
- Longest unbeaten run: Sioni (6)
- Longest winless run: Merani Martvili; Sapovnela; Zugdidi (5)
- Longest losing run: Merani Martvili (5)

The 2015–16 Umaglesi Liga was the 27th season of top-tier football in Georgia. Dila Gori were the defending champions. The season began on 13 August 2015 and ended on 22 May 2016. It was a last season with an autumn-spring schedule before the changes of competition format to spring-autumn schedule from 2017 season.

== Teams ==
=== Stadiums and locations ===
Locations of teams in the 2015–16 Umaglesi Liga

Team	Location	Venue	Capacity
Chikhura Sachkhere	Sachkhere	Givi Kiladze Stadium	
Dila Gori	Gori	Tengiz Burjanadze Stadium	
Dinamo Batumi	Kobuleti	Chele Arena	
Dinamo Tbilisi	Tbilisi	Boris Paichadze Stadium	54,549
Guria Lanchkhuti	Lanchkhuti	Evgrapi Shevardnadze Stadium	
Kolkheti Poti	Poti	Fazisi Stadium	
Locomotive Tbilisi	Tbilisi	Mikheil Meskhi Stadium	27,223
Merani Martvili	Martvili	Erosi Manjgaladze Stadium	
Saburtalo Tbilisi	Tbilisi	Mikheil Meskhi Stadium	27,223
Samtredia	Samtredia	Erosi Manjgaladze Stadium	
Sapovnela Terjola	Terjola	Sapovnela Stadium	
Shukura Kobuleti	Kobuleti	Chele Arena	
Sioni Bolnisi	Bolnisi	Mikheil Meskhi Stadium	27,223
Torpedo Kutaisi	Kutaisi	Givi Kiladze Stadium	
Tskhinvali	Tskhinvali	Mikheil Meskhi Stadium	27,223
Zugdidi	Zugdidi	Anaklia Stadium	

== League table ==
Pos	Team	Pld	W	D	L	GF	GA	GD	Pts	Qualification or relegation
1	Dinamo Tbilisi (C)	30	25	1	4	74	29	+45	76	Qualification for the Champions League second qualifying round (Note: Dinamo Tbilisi qualified for the Europa League first qualifying round by winning the 2015–16 Georgian Cup. However, since they already qualified for European competition based on their league position, the spot awarded to the cup winners was passed down the league.)
2	Samtredia	30	20	3	7	66	32	+34	63	Qualification for the Europa League first qualifying round
3	Dila Gori	30	19	5	6	51	25	+26	62	Qualification for the Europa League first qualifying round
4	Chikhura Sachkhere	30	17	6	7	53	26	+27	57	Qualification for the Europa League first qualifying round
5	Sioni Bolnisi	30	14	8	8	50	34	+16	50	
6	Torpedo Kutaisi	30	14	6	10	50	42	+8	48	
7	FC Tskhinvali	30	12	10	8	51	36	+15	46	
8	Dinamo Batumi	30	12	8	10	41	32	+9	44	
9	Saburtalo Tbilisi	30	11	6	13	47	61	−14	39	
10	Shukura Kobuleti	30	9	8	13	28	39	−11	35	
11	Guria Lanchkhuti	30	6	9	15	28	49	−21	27 (Note: Head-to-head record: Guria–Kolkheti Poti 1–1, Kolkheti Poti–Guria 0–1.)	
12	Kolkheti Poti	30	7	6	17	21	41	−20	27	
13	Locomotive Tbilisi	30	5	10	15	26	37	−11	25	
14	Zugdidi (O)	30	5	8	17	30	60	−30	23 (Note: Head-to-head record: Zugdidi–Merani Martvili 3–0, Merani Martvili–Zugdidi 0–0.)	Qualification to Relegation play-offs
15	Merani Martvili (R)	30	5	8	17	28	62	−34	23	Relegation to Pirveli Liga
16	Sapovnela Terjola (R)	30	5	6	19	24	63	−39	21	Relegation to Pirveli Liga

Source: UEFA, Soccerway
Rules for classification: 1) Points; 2) Head-to-head points; 3) Head-to-head goal difference; 4) Head-to-head goals scored; 5) Head-to-head away goals scored (only if two teams); 6) Goal difference; 7) Goals scored.
(C) Champions; (O) Play-off winners; (R) Relegated

== Results ==
Home \ Away	CHI	DIL	DBA	DIN	GUR	KOL	LOC	MER	SAB	SAM	SAP	SHU	SIO	TKU	TSK	ZUG
Chikhura Sachkhere		0–1	2–0	1–0	5–0	0–1	1–0	3–0	5–0	1–1	3–2	1–0	1–1	3–0	2–1	4–0
Dila Gori	1–1		1–1	2–0	5–0	2–0	1–0	2–0	2–1	1–2	3–1	1–3	2–1	0–1	3–0	3–0
Dinamo Batumi	1–1	2–2		1–2	1–2	2–0	1–0	0–0	2–1	2–0	1–0	2–2	3–5	1–1	2–0	5–0
Dinamo Tbilisi	2–0	0–1	1–0		3–2	5–2	2–1	2–0	4–0	3–1	4–0	1–0	5–2	2–1	2–1	3–1
Guria Lanchkhuti	1–3	0–1	1–1	0–2		1–1	0–0	0–0	0–0	0–2	3–0	0–0	1–1	3–2	1–2	2–0
Kolkheti Poti	2–0	0–1	0–1	1–3	0–1		4–0	2–1	1–0	0–3	0–0	1–0	0–1	2–0	0–0	0–0
Locomotive Tbilisi	2–2	0–2	1–1	1–4	3–0	1–0		1–1	3–2	0–1	0–0	0–0	0–0	1–2	0–1	3–0
Merani Martvili	3–2	3–2	0–4	1–4	2–0	1–1	0–3		2–5	2–3	2–0	1–2	1–1	2–1	2–3	0–0
Saburtalo Tbilisi	1–0	1–3	1–2	0–4	4–2	5–0	0–0	4–2		3–2	2–1	3–2	2–3	4–4	2–2	1–0
Samtredia	0–1	5–0	2–0	2–1	3–1	1–0	3–2	4–0	8–2		3–0	2–0	1–2	3–1	2–1	2–0
Sapovnela Terjola	0–2	1–5	2–1	1–2	0–2	0–0	2–1	2–1	0–0	2–3		2–0	0–0	1–5	2–1	2–2
Shukura Kobuleti	0–2	1–0	0–1	1–3	2–1	1–0	2–1	0–0	1–0	1–1	4–0		0–0	2–3	2–2	2–1
Sioni	4–0	0–1	1–0	1–2	1–1	3–1	1–0	3–0	0–0	0–2	4–1	2–0		6–2	1–3	3–1
Torpedo Kutaisi	0–2	0–2	1–0	1–1	2–1	1–0	2–0	4–0	5–0	2–1	4–1	0–0	1–0		1–3	2–0
Tskhinvali	1–1	0–0	3–2	2–4	0–0	5–1	1–1	1–1	1–2	1–0	3–0	5–0	2–0	0–0		5–1
Zugdidi	1–4	1–1	0–1	2–3	3–2	2–1	1–1	3–0	0–1	3–3	2–1	3–0	1–3	1–1	1–1	

Source: Soccerway
Legend: Blue = home team win; Yellow = draw; Red = away team win.

== Relegation play-offs ==
A match was played between Zugdidi, the fourteenth-placed team from the 2015–16 Umaglesi Liga and Kolkheti Khobi, the third-placed team from the 2015–16 Pirveli Liga. The winners, Zugdidi, remained in the top-flight for next season.

29 May 2016
17:00

Zugdidi	2–1	Kolkheti Khobi
Tsurtsumia 45+2'; Samushia 51'	Report	Tchanturidze 29'

Saragbo Baza Parki-Arena, Poti
Attendance: 1,500
Referee: Giorgi Vadatchkoria

== Top goalscorers ==
Rank	Goalscorer	Team	Goals
1	(Georgia (country)) Giorgi Kvilitaia	Dinamo Tbilisi	24
2	(Georgia (country)) Otar Martsvaladze	Dila Gori	19
3	(Georgia (country)) Budu Zivzivadze	Samtredia	16
4	(Georgia (country)) Giorgi Bukhaidze	Sapovnela Terjola	15
5	(Georgia (country)) Dimitri Tatanashvili	Sioni Bolnisi	14
6	(Georgia (country)) Nika Katcharava	FC Tskhinvali	13
6	(Georgia (country)) Irakli Sikharulidze	Samtredia	13
6	(Georgia (country)) Jambul Jighauri	Dinamo Tbilisi	13
9	(Georgia (country)) Giorgi Kharaishvili	Saburtalo Tbilisi	12
10	(Georgia (country)) Tornike Mumladze	Chikhura Sachkhere	11
10	(Georgia (country)) Irakli Modebadze	Dila Gori	11

Source: Top15goalscorers.blogspot.com

== See also ==
- 2015–16 Pirveli Liga
- 2015–16 Georgian Cup
