= FC Kolkheti Khobi =

Georgian football club based in Khobi

Kolkheti Khobi
- Full name: Football Club Kolkheti Khobi
- Founded: 1936; 90 years ago
- Ground: Paata Tatarishvili Tsentraluri Stadioni; Khobi, Georgia
- Capacity: 4,000
- Manager: Paata Bukia
- League: Liga 3
- 2025: 14th of 16, Liga 3
- Website: fckolkheti.ge

FC Kolkheti Khobi (Georgian: საფეხბურთო კლუბი კოლხეთი ხობი) is a Georgian association football club based in the town of Khobi. They compete in Liga 3, the third tier of Georgian football.

The club has spent four seasons in the top division.

== History ==
Established in 1936, Kolkheti played many years in Georgian championship during the Soviet Union. In 1988 the club won the title and advanced to the Soviet Second league where the next year they finished in the 5th place.

After 1990, when Umaglesi Liga was formed, Kolkheti participated in initial three seasons. Later they spent several years in the second and third divisions. The club returned to the top flight for 1999/2000 season only to finish at the bottom of the table.

In 2007, the club rejoined Pirveli Liga, where they played for ten successive seasons. Another promotion attempt was made in 2015/16 when Kolkheti finished 3rd in Liga 2. They shared equal points with WIT Georgia, who won automatic promotion, while Kolkheti participated in play-offs due to disadvantage in goal difference. The club suffered a narrow defeat in a one-legged tie, although it was known beforehand that due to the club's failure to get an Umaglesi Liga license, even the victory would not have led to promotion.

Furthermore, at the end of 2016 Kolkheti lost their Liga 2 place following the relegation semi-finals against Skuri. The return leg, marred by violent conduct against a referee, was aborted, which cost the club dearly. The GFF Disciplinary Committee handed Kolkheti a 0–3 defeat and a 5,000₾ fine.

The club usually stayed in mid-table in the next seasons. In 2022, Kolkheti beat their rivals battling for a promotion qualifying place, defeated Rustavi in both play-off matches and advanced to a higher league for the first time in sixteen years.

Back in the 2nd division, the club fought for survival in both seasons. In 2023, thanks to a goal scored deep into injury time by Giga Tsurtsumia, Kolkheti snatched victory over Liga 3 side Varketili in a return play-off match, but a year later their automatic relegation was confirmed with five games still to play.

Throughout the 2025 season in Liga 3, Kolkheti remained in the drop zone, although they avoided another relegation after another team was demoted.

== Seasons ==
Year	League	Pos	P	W	D	L	GF–GA	Pts	Cup
2007/08	Pirveli Liga Group A	8_{/10}	27	10	8	9	35-27	38	–
2008/09	Pirveli Liga Group A	8_{/11}	30	11	3	16	30-47	36	1st Round
2009/10	Pirveli Liga	10_{/15}	28	9	3	16	36-52	30	–
2010/11	Pirveli Liga	7_{/17}	32	12	10	10	28-34	46	1st Round
2011/12	Pirveli Liga Group A	7_{/10}	18	5	5	8	18-19	20	Round of 32
2011/12	Relegation round	2_{/8}	20	9	7	4	25-13	34	Round of 32
2012/13	Pirveli Liga Group B	4_{/16}	30	18	3	9	43-28	57	2nd Round
2013/14	Pirveli Liga Group B	9_{/10}	26	8	6	12	31-54	30	2nd Round
2014/15	Pirveli Liga Group B	8_{/10}	36	12	10	14	46-51	46	–
2015/16	Pirveli Liga	3_{/18} (Note: Lost 2–1 to Zugdidi in a promotion play-off tie)	34	18	10	6	60-29	64	1st Round
2016	Pirveli Liga	5_{/10}↓	16	5	6	5	20-24	21	2nd Round
2017	Liga 3 Red Group	3_{/10}	18	8	5	5	25-18	29	3rd Round
2017	Promotion Round	9_{/10}	18	3	4	11	9-39	13	3rd Round
2018	Liga 3	5_{/20}	38	17	10	11	54-35	61	2nd Round
2019	Liga 3	6_{/10}	36	11	8	17	39-54	41	2nd Round
2020	Liga 3	6_{/10}	18	5	7	6	27-24	22	2nd Round
2021	Liga 3	9_{/14}	26	6	13	7	32-39	31	1st Round
2022	Liga 3	4_{/16}↑ (Note: Beat Rustavi 2–0 on aggregate in Liga 2/3 play-offs)	30	15	9	6	53-32	54	1st Round
2023	Erovnuli Liga 2	7_{/10} (Note: Beat Varketili 1–0 on aggregate in Liga 2/3 play-offs)	36	12	10	14	44-52	46	Round of 16
2024	Erovnuli Liga 2	10_{/10}↓	36	4	8	24	30–85	20	3rd Round
2025	Liga 3	14_{/16}	30	7	5	18	35–63	26	1st Round

== Current squad ==
As of 20 March 2026

Note: Flags indicate national team as defined under FIFA eligibility rules; some limited exceptions apply. Players may hold more than one non-FIFA nationality.

No.	Pos.	Nation	Player
1	GK	GEO	Nika Jokhadze
3	DF	GEO	Mate Gergaia
4	MF	GEO	Lasha Mepishvili (C)
5	DF	GEO	Sandro Kiria
7	MF	GEO	Zaza Aianadi
8	FW	GEO	Zurab Kvachakhia
9	MF	GEO	Nika Gadua
10	FW	GEO	Giorgi Chedia
11	MF	GEO	Giorgi Mirzoevi
13	DF	GEO	Dato Todua

No.	Pos.	Nation	Player
14	DF	GEO	Zaur Kobakhidze
15	MF	GEO	Shalva Nadiradze
17	DF	GEO	Shmagi Bekauri
18	MF	GEO	Saba Vartagava
19	DF	GEO	Tornike Kalandia
20	DF	GEO	Malkhaz Patsatsia
21	GK	GEO	Zaza Gelashvili
22	MF	GEO	Otar Toradze
23	DF	GEO	Irakli Chankvetadze
26	MF	GEO	Irakli Shonia
30	FW	GEO	Giga Tsurtsumia

== Honours ==
- Pirveli Liga
  - Silver Medal winner: 1999
  - Third place: 2015-16

== Managers ==
Name	Nat.	From	To
Edik Sajaia	(Georgia (country)) (Russia)	2018	2018
Levan Nodia	(Georgia (country))	2019	2019
Paata Bukia	(Georgia (country))	2019	2019
Merab Kharbedia	(Georgia (country))	2019	2020
Paata Bukia	(Georgia (country))	2020	2020
Zurab Pirtskhalaishvili	(Georgia (country))	2020	2021
Levan Nodia	(Georgia (country))	2021	2021
Levan Khurtsilava	(Georgia (country))	2022	2022
Levan Nodia	(Georgia (country))	2023	2023
Besik Sherozia	(Georgia (country))	2023	2024
Gia Gigatadze	(Georgia (country))	2024	2024
Tsotne Moniava	(Georgia (country))	2024	2024
Levan Nodia	(Georgia (country))	2025	2025
Paata Bukia	(Georgia (country))	2025	

== Stadium ==
The central stadium of Khobi named after Paata Tatarishvili was initially envisaged for 12,000 spectators. Following a major reconstruction completed in 2017, its capacity has sustained a three-fold reduction.

== Name ==
Although the club is widely known with the current name, previously they were also referred to as Olimpia Khobi and FC Khobi.

The very name stems from Colchis, an ancient state situated at the eastern Black Sea coast.
