= Koba Shalamberidze =

Georgian footballer

Personal information
- Full name: Koba Shalamberidze
- Date of birth: 15 October 1984 (age 42)
- Place of birth: Kutaisi, Soviet Union
- Height: 1.74 m (5 ft 8 1/2 in)
- Position: Midfielder

Team information
- Current team: Górnik Lubin

Youth career
- 2001–2003: Dinamo-3 Tbilisi
- 2003–2004: Dinamo-2 Tbilisi

Senior career*
Years	Team	Apps	(Gls)
2004–2005	Spartaki Tbilisi	22	(5)
2005	Dinamo-2 Tbilisi	13	(1)
2005–2006	Torpedo Kutaisi	14	(1)
2006	Spartaki Tbilisi	6	(1)
2006–2007	Meshakre Agara	17	(6)
2007	Dinamo Batumi	13	(1)
2007–2008	Ameri Tbilisi	13	(1)
2008	Spartaki Tskhinvali	14	(2)
2009	Sioni Bolnisi	13	(0)
2009–2010	Spartaki Tskhinvali	15	(2)
2010–2011	Odra Wodzisław	19	(0)
2011	Sioni Bolnisi	9	(2)
2011–2012	Spartaki Tskhinvali	17	(3)
2012–2013	Flota Świnoujście	6	(0)
2013–2014	Guria Lanchkhuti	28	(3)
2014	Dila Gori	9	(2)
2014–2015	Guria Lanchkhuti	27	(7)
2015–2016	Sioni Bolnisi	18	(2)
2016–2017	Shukura Kobuleti	38	(9)
2018–2019	Tskhinvali	25	(4)
2019	Gagra	17	(3)
2020	Odra Wodzisław	13	(1)
2021	Iberia 1999		
2021	Merani Tbilisi	1	(0)
2026–	Górnik Lubin	0	(0)
- * Club domestic league appearances and goals as of 11:48, 29 March 2026 (UTC)

Koba Shalamberidze (Georgian: კობა შალამბერიძე; born 15 October 1984) is a Georgian professional footballer who plays as a midfielder for Polish club Górnik Lubin.

== Career ==
=== Club ===
He started his football career at Umaglesi Liga club Spartaki Tbilisi. He also played in the Dinamo Tbilisi, Torpedo Kutaisi, Dinamo Batumi, Meshakre Agara, Ameri Tbilisi, Sioni Bolnisi, Spartaki Tskhinvali, as well as Polish clubs Odra Wodzisław and Flota Świnoujście.

== Personal life ==
Born in Kutaisi, a town in Imereti Province.

== Honours ==
Ameri Tbilisi

- Georgian Super Cup: 2007
