= FC Liakhvi Tskhinvali =

Georgian football club

Liakhvi Tskhinvali
- Full name: FC Liakhvi Tskhinvali
- Founded: 2014; 12 years ago
- Dissolved: 2020; 6 years ago
- Ground: Kartli Stadium, Gori, Georgia
- Capacity: 1,500
- League: N/A

FC Liakhvi Tskhinvali (Georgian: საფეხბურთო კლუბი ცხინვალის ლიახვი) is a defunct Georgian football club which spent several years in three different divisions of the national league. Due to the Georgian-Ossetian conflict, they were unable to play in Tskhinvali being instead based in the nearby city of Gori.

Liakhvi experienced a swift rise and fall. They won the Pirveli Liga in 2016 but failed to gain promotion to the top flight.

== History ==
Liakhvi were formed in 2014 with the aim to contribute to the normalization of relations between Georgians and Ossetians affected by a decades-old conflict. Initially, the team squad included 13 Ossetian footballers, including captain Valery Jeliev.

The club achieved success in their very first season. In 2015, under former Dinamo Tbilisi manager Malkhaz Zhvania they beat Mark Stars by one point to win the Centre group of the 3rd division. Reinforced by several experienced players such as Maksime Kvilitaia and Otar Khizaneishvili, Liakhvi unveiled an ambitious plan for further promotion.

In contrast with the previous year, this time they convincingly prevailed over their league rivals and finished the 2015-16 Pirveli Liga season with a five-point margin. Their forward Revaz Barabadze was the second topscorer with 19 goals. However, Liakhvi were denied promotion to the Umaglesi Liga due to their failure to obtain a league license.

Forced to remain in the Pirveli Liga, Liakhvi soon were embroiled in another trouble. In November 2016, they were accused of match fixing, fined 10,000₾ and deducted six points. The club pleaded not guilty, announced their determination to cooperate with the authorities in an attempt to avoid punishment but to no avail. After being demolished by Borjomi in relegation playoffs, Liakhvi went down back to the 3rd league.

Following another torrid season, Liakhvi hit rock bottom in 2017. They spent last three seasons in Regionuli Liga before ceasing their activities.

== Seasons ==
| Year | League | Pos | M | W | D | L | GD | P |
|---|---|---|---|---|---|---|---|---|
| 2014–15 | Meore Liga Centre | ↑1st of 16 | 25 | 20 | 4 | 1 | 78–18 | 64 |
| 2015–16 | Pirveli Liga | 1st of 18 | 34 | 20 | 9 | 5 | 82–36 | 69 |
| 2016 | Pirveli Liga White | ↓6th of 10 (Note: Lost relegation play-offs to Borjomi 8–1 on aggregate) | 16 | 2 | 4 | 10 | 16−39 | 4 (Note: Deducted 6 points) |
| 2017 | Liga 3 White | ↓10th of 10 | 18 | 2 | 3 | 13 | 17–47 | 9 |
| 2018 | Regionuli Liga A | 4th of 11 | 20 | 11 | 2 | 7 | 56–29 | 35 |
| 2019 | Regionuli Liga | | | | | | | |
| 2020 | Regionuli Liga A | 10th of 14 | 13 | 5 | 1 | 7 | 23–28 | 16 |

== Honours ==
Pirveli Liga

- Champions: 2015–16

Meore Liga

- Champions: 2014–15 (Group Centre)

== Name ==
Liakhvi is the name of a river that flows through the Shida Kartli region. It is a tributary of Mtkvari.
