= Vladimer Bochorishvili Stadium =

Multi-use stadium in Tkibuli, Imereti, Georgia

Vladimer Bochorishvili Stadium ვლადიმერ ბოჭორიშვილის სტადიონი
- Interactive map of Vladimer Bochorishvili Stadium ვლადიმერ ბოჭორიშვილის სტადიონი
- Location: (Georgia (country)) Tkibuli, Imereti, Georgia
- Coordinates: 42°21′16″N 42°59′38″E
- Owner: Government of Georgia
- Capacity: 14,700
- Surface: Grass
- Field size: 105 m × 70 m (344 ft × 230 ft)

Tenant
- FC Meshakhte Tkibuli

Vladimer Bochorishvili Stadium (ვლადიმერ ბოჭორიშვილის სტადიონი) is a multi-use stadium in Tkibuli, Imereti region, Georgia. It is used mostly for football matches and is the home stadium of FC Meshakhte Tkibuli. The stadium is able to hold 6,000 people.

== See also ==
- FC Meshakhte Tkibuli
- Stadiums in Georgia
