= FC Chiatura =

Georgian football club

Chiatura
- Full name: Football Club Magharoeli Chiatura
- Nickname: Chiatura
- Founded: 1923; 103 years ago
- Ground: Temur Maghradze Stadium; Chiatura, Georgia
- Manager: Givi Chinchaladze
- League: Regionuli Liga
- 2025: 8th of 16, Regionuli Liga
Home colours	Away colours

FC Magaroeli is a Georgian football club based from the city Chiatura. Since the 2023 season they have been competing in Regionuli Liga, the fifth tier of Georgian football.

The team has twice participated in the top tier.

== History ==
Formed in 1923, Chiatura won the Georgian championship in 1975, and also clinched the domestic Cup title in 1978 and 1979. The club spent four seasons in the Soviet Second league.

In the 1992/93 season the club finished second in Pirveli Liga which paved the way for Umaglesi Liga in 1993/94. Magaroeli participated in the top flight also in 1997/98.

Between 2004 and 2017 the club spent 13 successive seasons in Liga 2. At one point the club came close to another promotion. After winning the 2007–08 season with a 23-point margin, they beat Gagra on penalties in champions play-offs, although Chiatura eventually had to give up their Umaglesi Liga place after their failure to meet the criteria existing for top-flight clubs.

While the team stayed in top half of the table for four consecutive seasons, they were involved in survival battles in 2016. In this season Magaroeli were deducted three points for fielding an ineligible player. In play-offs they failed to overcome Meshakhte Tkibuli and left the league.

The next year they won the regular season in Liga 3, although displayed a poor performance in the promotion tournament.

In 2018, Chiatura finished in 12th place in a 20-team league and along with all other bottom-half clubs were relegated to the newly formed Liga 4.

The team came 2nd in 2020. Even though this result fell short of the promotion, some changes of the league format announced in January 2021 by GFF awarded Magaroeli a Liga 3 place for the upcoming season.

The club was struggling in the next two years. In both cases they finished in the drop zone and suffered back-to-back relegations.

== Seasons ==
Year	League	Pos	P	W	D	L	GF	GA	Pts
2005-06	Pirveli Liga	14_{/18}	34	10	7	17	38	56	37
2006-07	Pirveli Liga	6_{/18}	34	16	9	9	49	32	57
2007-08	Pirveli Liga A Group	1_{/10}	27	21	4	2	56	17	67
2008-09	Pirveli Liga A Group	6_{/11}	30	12	3	15	38	48	39
2009-10	Pirveli Liga	11_{/15}	28	9	3	16	36	58	30
2010-11	Pirveli Liga	16_{/17}	32	8	5	19	28	69	29
2011-12	Pirveli Liga Group A	3_{/10}	18	11	4	3	30	16	37
2012-13	Pirveli Liga Group A	5_{/12}	33	13	6	14	42	66	45
2013-14	Pirveli Liga Group B	6_{/14}	26	12	4	10	44	46	40
2014-15	Pirveli Liga Group B	5_{/10}	36	17	3	16	53	52	54
2015-16	Pirveli Liga	12_{/18}	34	9	15	10	41	48	42
2016	Pirveli Liga Group Red	6_{/9}↓ (Note: Lost to Meshakhte 1–6 on aggregate in relegation play-offs)	16	7	2	7	15	21	20 (Note: Three points deducted)
2017	Liga 3 Red Group	1_{/10}	18	12	4	2	32	14	40
2017	Promotion Group	7_{/10}	18	5	2	11	15	33	17
2018	Liga 3	12_{/20}↓	38	12	15	11	39	47	47
2019	Liga 4	8_{/10}	27	8	4	15	29	45	28
2020	Liga 4 White Group	2_{/8}↑	14	6	6	2	23	11	24
2021	Liga 3	13_{/14}↓	26	5	6	15	23	46	21
2022	Liga 4	15_{/16}↓	30	6	6	18	37	75	24
2023	Regionuli Liga	10_{/13}	24	6	5	13	27	64	23
2024	Regionuli Liga	10_{/13}	24	6	3	15	29	8	21
2025	Regionuli Liga C	8_{/16}	30	13	5	12	54	72	44

== Players ==
As of April 2022

Note: Flags indicate national team as defined under FIFA eligibility rules; some limited exceptions apply. Players may hold more than one non-FIFA nationality.

No.	Pos.	Nation	Player
3	DF	GEO	Jimi Giorgadze
4	DF	GEO	Saba Turmanidze
6	DF	GEO	Givi Lashkhi
7	MF	GEO	Giga Abramishvili
8	MF	GEO	Giorgi Avanovi
9	FW	GEO	Levan Kutchashvili
10	MF	GEO	Tornike Devidze
11	FW	GEO	Saba Gabadze
13	GK	GEO	Giorgi Khvedelidze

No.	Pos.	Nation	Player
14	FW	GEO	Mikheil Mikeladze
17	DF	GEO	Mirza Chkhitunidze
19	MF	GEO	Giorgi Bakuradze
21	FW	GEO	Koba Kapanadze
22	MF	GEO	Aleksandre Bablidze
23	DF	GEO	Givi Samkurashvili
24	MF	GEO	Davit Chachua
29	FW	GEO	Nika Gaprindashvili (C)
31	GK	GEO	Zviad Japaridze
33	DF	GEO	Lasha Kutchashvili

== Honours ==
- Georgian Soviet Championship
  - Champion: 1975
- Georgian Soviet Cup
  - Champion: 1978, 1979
- Pirveli Liga:
  - Champion: 1997, 2008
  - Bronze prize winner: 1992, 1996, 2012
- Meore Liga
  - Winner: 2017 (Red Group)
- Liga 4
  - Runners-up: 2020

== Stadium ==
The club hosts their league games at the Temur Maghradze stadium, which has a capacity of 11,650.

== Name ==
The club several times changed the name from Chiatura to Magaroeli and back. The latter literally means a miner implying the existing Chiatura mine complex in this town.
