= FC Skuri =

FC Skuri Tsalenjikha
- Full name: FC Skuri Tsalenjikha
- Ground: Sasha Kvaratskhelia Stadium, Tsalenjikha
- Capacity: 4 000
- Chairman: Nika Kakachia
- Manager: Givi Kvaratskhelia
- League: Liga 4
- 2025: 5th of 16 in Liga 4
Home colours	Away colours

FC Skuri, occasionally also spelled as Squri, is a Georgian football club, based in the town of Tsalenjikha. Currently they compete in Liga 4, the fourth tier of Georgian football.

== History ==
During the late Soviet times, Skuri was mainly a member of the first division of the Georgian domestic league. After the 1990s the team competed for years in Pirveli Liga, the second division of national championship.

Skuri suffered a defeat in the 2014–15 fierce survival battle, although still obtained the right to remain in the league after another club was expelled. In 2016, they were defeated in the play-off final and relegated to the third league.

A year later Skuri lost another relegation play-off tie and, as a result, had to leave Liga 3 as well.

Having played for the next two seasons in Regionuli Liga, the club gained promotion to the newly formed Liga 4 for the 2020 season after winning the first phase of the competition and coming 3rd in the Promotion Group.

== Squad ==
As of 25 April 2026

Note: Flags indicate national team as defined under FIFA eligibility rules; some limited exceptions apply. Players may hold more than one non-FIFA nationality.

No.	Pos.	Nation	Player
1	GK	GEO	Dimitri Megrelishvili
2	DF	GEO	Levan Vardiashvili
3	DF	GEO	RLevan Tskhvariashvili
4	DF	GEO	Giorgi Talakhadze
5	DF	GEO	Malkhaz Nadareishvili
6	MF	GEO	Ilham Mamedov
7	MF	GEO	Giorgi Kighuradze
8	MF	GEO	Giorgi Shainidze
9	FW	GEO	Sandro Chkhaidze
10	MF	GEO	Luka Archaia

No.	Pos.	Nation	Player
11	FW	GEO	Ilia Mikava
12	DF	GEO	Davit Gobechia
13	MF	GEO	Giorgi Natroshvili
15	MF	GEO	Levan Skhirtladze
17	DF	GEO	Ivane Ksovreli
19	DF	GEO	Giorgi Lomidze
20	FW	GEO	Giorgi Gabriadze
23	MF	GEO	Lasha Jgamaia (C)
33	FW	GEO	Irakli Kavelashvili
37	GK	GEO	Luka Jojua

== Seasons ==
Year	League	Pos	MP	W	D	L	GF–GA	Pts	Notes
2011/12	Pirveli Liga Group A	4th of 10	18	8	3	7	25-26	27	
2012/13	Pirveli Liga Group A	9th of 12	33	10	8	15	33-51	38	
2013/14	Pirveli Liga Group A	10th of 13	24	6	4	14	24-52	22	
2014/15	Pirveli Liga Group B	9th of 10	36	11	13	12	47-55	46	
2015/16	Pirveli Liga	10th of 18	34	11	10	13	32-33	43	
2016	Pirveli Liga Group Red	4th of 9	16	6	3	7	32-24	21	Relegated after playoffs (Note: Lost 2–0 on aggregate to Meshakhte)
2017	Liga 3 Red Group	8th of 10	18	4	5	9	16-27	17	
2017	Relegation Group	6th of 10	18	6	6	6	22-22	24	Relegated after a playoff (Note: Lost 2–1 to Aragvi)
2018	Regionuli Liga West	7th of 8	14	3	2	9	17-34	11	
2019	Regionuli Liga West	3rd of 10	18	12	3	3	41-20	39	
2019	Promotion Group	1st of 11	10	8	1	1	33-12	25	Promoted
2020	Liga 4 White Group	4th of 8	14	5	4	5	28-23	19	
2021	Liga 4 Red Group	3rd of 10	18	9	4	5	32-23	31	
2021	Promotion Group	9th of 10	18	3	1	14	22-55	10	
2022	Liga 4	5th of 16	30	13	7	10	46-40	46	
2023	Liga 4	12th of 14	26	7	2	17	33-69	23	
2024	Liga 4	6th of 15	28	13	3	12	55-60	42	
2025	Liga 4	5th of 16	30	16	5	9	56-40	53	

== Name ==
Skuri is a balneological resort located in Tsalenjikha municipality.
