= Jemal Zeinklishvili Stadium =

Multi-use stadium in Borjomi, Georgia

- ჯემალ ზეინკლიშვილის სტადიონი
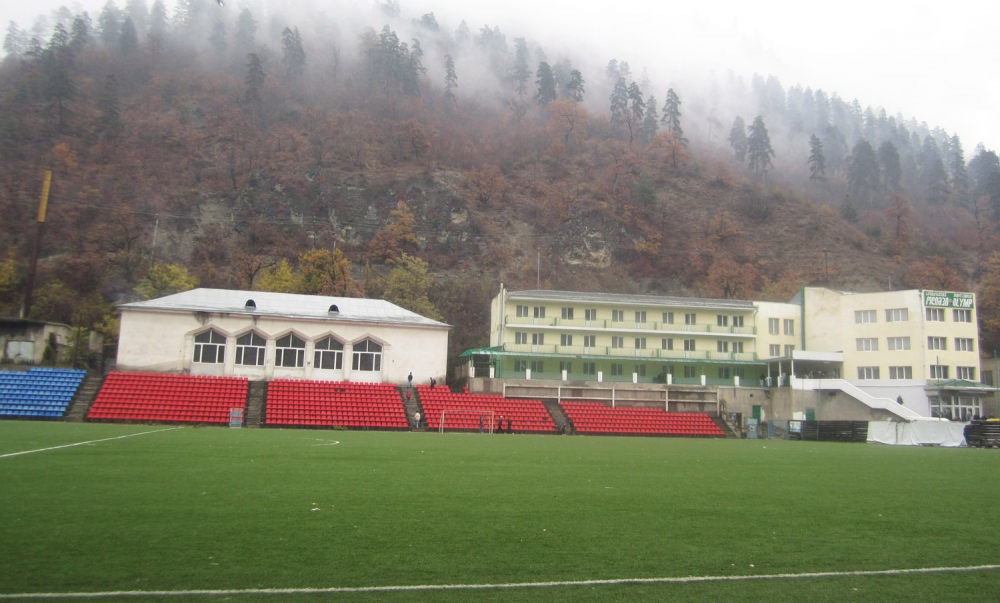
- Interactive map of Jemal Zeinklishvili Stadium
- Location: Borjomi, Samtskhe–Javakheti, Georgia
- Coordinates: 41°50′35″N 43°23′19″E

Construction
- Renovated: 2007

Jemal Zeinklishvili Stadium (ჯემალ ზეინკლიშვილის სტადიონი) is a multi-use stadium in Borjomi, Samtskhe–Javakheti region, Georgia. It is used mostly for football matches and is the home stadium of FC Borjomi. The stadium is able to hold 4,000 people.

A stadium in Borjomi also is home to an artificial turf pitch, called Xtreme Turf. This football turf was manufactured and installed by Act Global.
