= Temur Maghradze Stadium =

Multi-use stadium in Chiatura, Imereti, Georgia

Temur Maghradze Stadium თემურ მაღრაძის სტადიონი
- Interactive map of Temur Maghradze Stadium თემურ მაღრაძის სტადიონი
- Location: Chiatura, Imereti, Georgia
- Coordinates: 42°16′50″N 43°16′19″E
- Owner: Government of Georgia
- Capacity: 11,650
- Surface: Grass
- Field size: 105 m × 70 m (344 ft × 230 ft)

Tenant
- FC Chiatura

Temur Maghradze Stadium is a multi-use stadium in Chiatura, Imereti region, Georgia. It is used mostly for football matches and is the home stadium of FC Chiatura. The stadium is able to hold 11,650 people.

== See also ==
- FC Chiatura
- Stadiums in Georgia
