= FC Meshakhte Tkibuli =

Georgian football club

Meshakhte
- Full name: Meshakhte Tkibuli
- Founded: 1938; 88 years ago
- Ground: Vladimer Bochorishvili Stadium; Tkibuli, Georgia
- Capacity: 6,000
- Chairman: Levan Japaridze
- Manager: Kakhaber Chkhetiani
- League: Erovnuli Liga
- 2025: 3rd of 10 (promoted) in Liga 2
- Website: klubimeshakhte.ge

FC Meshakhte (Georgian: საფეხბურთო კლუბი მეშახტე) is a Georgian professional football club based in Tkibuli. Following the 2025 season, they were promoted to the Erovnuli Liga, the top tier of Georgian football.

They are the two-time league champions and two-time cup winners of the Soviet period.

== History ==
Meshakhte participated in the Georgian Soviet league and twice, in 1980 and 1981, became champions. In 1964 and 1976 they also won the domestic Cup.

The club spent 13 seasons in the Soviet third division with the following combined results:

M	W	D	L	GF–GA
303	127	60	116	414-399

The success of the club was attributed to the large coal mine industry based in Tkibuli which financed the local football as well.

First years after the Georgian national league was formed, the club played in the second division. Between 1991 and 1996 they three times finished third and once, in 1997, came 2nd. Starting from 2005, Meshakhte spent thirteen consecutive seasons in Pirveli Liga.

The team had a third-place finish in 2016, which was their highest position during this period. But the next season turned out troublesome. The team produced a seventeen-game unwinning run. Three points earned in the last round saved the club from automatic relegation, although a home-and-away play-off tie ended unfavorably.

After two years in Liga 3 Meshakhte, struggling the whole season, finished at the bottom in 2020. However, they avoided another relegation due to some changes, introduced in late January 2021, which increased the number of clubs in this league.

In 2022, Meshakhte took part in a long survival battle, but they lost a crucial game and ended up in the drop zone. Nevertheless, this time due to disqualification of another club, the Miners retained their place in this division.

In June 2024, 70% of the club's share was put up for auction. As a result, Okriba Meshakhte Ltd took over the management with the rest of the share remaining in municipal property.

Meshakhte significantly improved in 2024, joining a title race from the very outset. They finished 2nd and sealed automatic promotion back to Erovnuli Liga 2 after a seven-year break.

The team continued its successful run in the 2nd division as well. After a narrow away win over the crowned league champions Rustavi in a final match of the season, Meshakhte under manager Lado Burduli sealed a play-off spot for the first time in their history. They went on to win a penalty shoot-out against Telavi to complete a back-to-back promotion to the top tier.

On 12 March 2026, Meshakhte claimed a historic away victory over the reigning cup holders Dila. Unable to hold their home matches in Tkibuli due to league requirements, the team was relocated to the Tskaltubo stadium for the whole season.

== Seasons ==
Year	League	Pos	P	W	D	L	GF	GA	Pts
2005/06	Pirveli Liga	13_{/18}	34	11	9	14	38	40	42
2006/07	Pirveli Liga	9_{/18}	34	15	6	13	53	40	51
2007/08	Pirveli Liga	2_{/10}	27	14	2	11	39	41	44
2008/09	Pirveli Liga	11_{/11}	30	4	4	22	20	61	16
2009/10	Pirveli Liga	12_{/15}	28	6	7	15	36	68	25
2010/11	Pirveli Liga	10_{/17}	32	10	5	17	32	48	35
2011/12	Pirveli Liga	10_{/10}	18	2	4	12	16	33	10
2011/12	B Group	4_{/8}	20	9	3	8	35	32	30
2012/13	Pirveli Liga Group A	5_{/12}	33	13	6	14	42	66	45
2013/14	Pirveli Liga Group A	7_{/13}	24	8	8	8	37	38	32
2014/15	Pirveli Liga Group B	7_{/10}	36	14	5	17	57	55	47
2015/16	Pirveli Liga	11_{/18}	34	10	12	12	28	31	42
2016	Pirveli Liga Group White	3_{/9}	16	9	2	5	25	12	29
2017	Erovnuli Liga 2	9_{/10}↓	36	7	6	23	33	75	27
2018	Liga 3	8_{/20}	38	17	6	15	59	54	57
2019	Liga 3	8_{/10}	36	11	6	19	43	55	39
2020	Liga 3	10_{/10}	18	1	3	14	10	45	6
2021	Liga 3	10_{/14}	26	8	6	12	31	45	30
2022	Liga 3	14_{/16}	30	10	5	15	35	39	35
2023	Liga 3	5_{/16}	30	15	10	5	49	24	55
2024	Liga 3	2_{/16}↑	30	18	6	6	54	22	60
2025	Erovnuli Liga 2	3_{/10}↑	30	13	13	10	34	25	52

== Players ==
As of 29 July, 2026

Note: Flags indicate national team as defined under FIFA eligibility rules; some limited exceptions apply. Players may hold more than one non-FIFA nationality.

No.	Pos.	Nation	Player
1	GK	GEO	Levan Tkeshelashvili
2	DF	GEO	Nikoloz Sherozia
3	DF	GEO	Zurab Gigashvili
4	DF	GEO	Mate Tereladze
6	MF	GEO	Giorgi Papuashvili
7	MF	GEO	Erekle Jijavadze
8	MF	GEO	Giorgi Jamarauli
9	FW	GEO	Irakli Sikharulidze
10	FW	GEO	Giorgi Gogolashvili
11	FW	GEO	Mate Kvirkvia
13	DF	GEO	Giorgi Burduli
14	MF	GEO	Mirian Jikia
16	DF	GEO	Giorgi Gegia
18	MF	GEO	Tsotne Patsatsia

No.	Pos.	Nation	Player
19	MF	GEO	Ilia Dgebuadze
20	DF	GEO	Levan Kurdadze
21	DF	GEO	Giorgi Kvirkvelia
22	MF	BIH	Tarik Šikalo
23	MF	GEO	Beka Shubitidze
25	DF	RUS	Rauf Novruzov
26	MF	GEO	Beka Gabiskiria
28	FW	GEO	Zurab Zumbadze
29	GK	GEO	Levan Shovnadze
30	MF	UKR	Maksim Pirogov
31	MF	BRA	Eric Pimentel (on loan from Torpedo Kutaisi)
36	FW	GEO	Lekso Kvelaidze
37	FW	BRA	Rafael Lima (on loan from Torpedo Kutaisi)
40	DF	GEO	Lasha Ugrekhelidze

== Stadium ==
When the central stadium was opened in 1968, initially it was 17,000-seater in a city with almost 23,000 residents. It is currently able to hold 6,000 spectators.

== Honours ==
=== Soviet competitions ===
Georgian Soviet Championship

- Champion: 1980, 1981

Georgian Soviet Cup

- Champion: 1964, 1976

=== Georgian competitions ===
Pirveli Liga / Erovnuli Liga 2

- Runners-up: 2008
- Bronze Medal winner: 1991, 1994, 1995, 2025

Liga 3

- Runners-up: 2024

== Name ==
In 1991, the club took part in the second division as Okriba only to regain the current name the next season.

Meshakhte literally means a miner. The name comes from shakhta which can be translated as a shaft in coal mine industry.
