= FC Chkherimela Kharagauli =

Chkherimela
- Full name: Football Club Chkherimela Kharagauli
- Nickname: Chkherimela
- Founded: 1982; 44 years ago
- Dissolved: 2021; 5 years ago
- Ground: Murtaz and Soso Abashidze stadium, Kharagauli
Home colours	Away colours

FC Chkherimela Kharagauli (Georgian: სკ ჩხერიმელა) was a Georgian football club based in the town of Kharagauli.

== History ==
Founded in 1982, the club participated the lower leagues of the Georgian SSR Championships until 1997. Twelve years later the team resumed their activities as Chkherimela 2009 and took part in the third division. They gained promotion to Pirveli Liga where retained their place up until 2016. Having been accused of involvement in a match-fixing scandal, Chkherimela were deducted six points, fined and expelled from the competition.

The team played in Liga 3 for one year before being relegated to Regionuli Liga.

In 2018 the club was subjected to reorganization and reduction of financial assistance by five times compared to previous three years. Based on complaints from two former coaches, the next year the district court in Kutaisi and the Supreme Court ruled that Chkherimela owed them around 20 thousand lari.

In 2018 a Georgian record-breaking event occurred during a Regionuli Liga game held in Kharagauli. 65 year-old Soso Abashidze, a long-time Chkherimela player, scored a goal against Mertskali.

In February 2021 Chkherimela officially ceased to exist.

== Stadium ==
In 2004 the stadium in Kharagauli was named after brothers Murtaz and Soso Abashidze, the two local football players who established the club in 1982. Lately it has become a home ground for Margveti 2006.

== Current squad ==
Note: Flags indicate national team as defined under FIFA eligibility rules; some limited exceptions apply. Players may hold more than one non-FIFA nationality.

No.	Pos.	Nation	Player
1	GK	GEO	Mikheil Lomsadze
2	DF	GEO	Beso Tkeshelashvili
3	DF	GEO	Guram Khecuriani
4	DF	GEO	Nikoloz Kharabadze
5	DF	GEO	Giorgi Metreveli
6	DF	GEO	Lado Tabukashvili
7	FW	GEO	Jaba Avalishvili
9	FW	GEO	Beka Kebuladze

No.	Pos.	Nation	Player
10	MF	GEO	Dachi Kostava
11	MF	GEO	Irakli Gibradze
12	GK	GEO	Ioram Kuchukhidze (captain)
13	MF	GEO	Levan Machaladze
14	FW	GEO	Tornike Danelia
16	DF	GEO	Givi Zakarashvili
17	MF	GEO	Zaza Kapanadze
18	DF	GEO	Tsotne Nanitashvili
