= 2018 FC Dinamo Tbilisi season =

FC Dinamo Tbilisi
2018 season
- Chairman: Roman Pipia
- Manager: Kakhaber Kacharava; Zaur Svanadze
- Stadium: Dinamo Arena
- Erovnuli Liga: Runnersup
- Georgian Cup: Semi-Final vs Gagra
- UEFA Europa League: First qualifying round vs DAC 1904
- Top goalscorer: League: Budu Zivzivadze (22); All: Budu Zivzivadze (28)

The 2018 FC Dinamo Tbilisi season was the thirtieth successive season that FC Dinamo Tbilisi played in the top flight of Georgian football.

== Season events ==
On 30 December, Dinamo announced the season-long loan signing of Oto Goshadze from Saburtalo Tbilisi.

On 3 January, Dinamo announced the signing of Giorgi Ivanishvili from Chikhura Sachkhere to a two-year contract.

On 9 January, Dinamo announced the signing of Budu Zivzivadze from Esbjerg fB on a one-year loan deal.

On 12 February, Dinamo announced the signing of Guja Rukhaia from Sibir Novosibirsk to a one-year contract and the signing of Dmytro Ivanisenya from Illichivets Mariupol to a two-year contract.

On 29 March, Dinamo announced the loan signing of Luka Lochoshvili from Dynamo Kyiv until June, with the option to extend the loan.

On 11 June, Dinamo announced that Giorgi Tevzadze had left the club after his contract had ended.

On 15 June, Dinamo announced that Nika Dzalamidze had left the club after his contract was ended by mutual consent.

On 25 June, Dinamo announced that Oto Goshadze's loan deal from Saburtalo Tbilisi had been ended.

On 5 July, Dinamo announced the signing of Mate Vatsadze from Silkeborg IF on a contract until the end of the season.

On 6 July, Dinamo announced the signing of Ștefan Sicaci from Afips Afipsky on a contract until the end of the season.

On 31 July, Otar Kiteishvili left Dinamo to sign for Sturm Graz.

On 15 August, Dinamo announced the signing of Levan Shengelia from Tubize-Braine to a one-year contract.

On 13 September, Dinamo announced the signing of Luqman Gilmore from Imereti Khoni on a contract until the end of the season.

On 22 December, Dinamo Tbilisi announced the signing of Nodar Iashvili to an 18-month contract from Saburtalo Tbilisi for the upcoming 2019 season.

On 25 December, Dinamo Tbilisi announced the signing of Levan Kutalia to a one-year contract from Torpedo Kutaisi for the upcoming 2019 season.

== Squad ==
As of match played 8 December 2018

No.	Name	Nationality	Position	Date of birth (age)	Signed from	Signed in	Contract ends	Apps.	Goals
Goalkeepers
13	Demetre Buliskeria	(Georgia (country))	GK	9 January 2000 (aged 18)	Academy	2017		24	0
25	Giorgi Mamardashvili	(Georgia (country))	GK	29 September 2000 (aged 18)	Academy	2018		0	0
88	Ștefan Sicaci	(Moldova)	GK	8 September 1988 (aged 30)	Afips Afipsky	2018	2018	18	0
Defenders
2	Guja Rukhaia	(Russia)	DF	22 July 1987 (aged 31)	Sibir Novosibirsk	2018	2018	41	1
3	Lasha Totadze	(Georgia (country))	DF	24 August 1988 (aged 30)	Sioni Bolnisi	2017	2018	103	14
4	Luka Lochoshvili	(Georgia (country))	DF	29 May 1998 (aged 20)	on loan from Dynamo Kyiv	2018	2018	49	1
5	Davit Kobouri	(Georgia (country))	DF	24 January 1998 (aged 20)	Academy	2015		58	2
19	Levan Kharabadze	(Georgia (country))	DF	26 January 2000 (aged 18)	Academy	2018		37	4
30	Luka Kapianidze	(Georgia (country))	DF	10 January 1999 (aged 19)	Academy	2016		5	0
44	Tornike Dzotsenidze	(Georgia (country))	DF	7 November 1999 (aged 19)	Academy	2018		3	0
Midfielders
6	Bakar Kardava	(Georgia (country))	MF	4 October 1994 (aged 24)	Tskhinvali	2017		54	2
7	Giorgi Zaria	(Georgia (country))	MF	14 July 1997 (aged 21)	Dinamo Batumi	2015		45	4
8	Giorgi Kutsia	(Georgia (country))	MF	27 October 1999 (aged 19)	Academy	2017		47	3
10	Otar Kiteishvili	(Georgia (country))	MF	26 March 1996 (aged 22)	Academy	2013		126	23
11	Akaki Shulaia	(Georgia (country))	MF	6 September 1996 (aged 22)	Merani Martvili	2017		55	13
15	Lasha Kochladze	(Georgia (country))	MF	22 August 1995 (aged 23)	Tskhinvali	2018		39	4
18	Dmytro Ivanisenya	(Ukraine)	MF	11 January 1994 (aged 24)	Illichivets Mariupol	2018	2019	39	4
21	Giorgi Ivanishvili	(Georgia (country))	MF	18 October 1989 (aged 29)	Chikhura Sachkhere	2018	2019	32	4
22	Beka Dartsmelia	(Georgia (country))	MF	21 March 2000 (aged 18)	Academy	2017		3	0
24	Paata Kiteishvili	(Georgia (country))	MF	16 January 1999 (aged 19)	Academy	2018		1	0
27	Levan Shengelia	(Georgia (country))	MF	27 October 1995 (aged 23)	Tubize-Braine	2018	2019	19	6
29	Luqman Gilmore	(Nigeria)	MF	10 May 1996 (aged 22)	Imereti Khoni	2018	2018	2	0
32	Nika Ninua	(Georgia (country))	MF	22 June 1999 (aged 19)	Academy	2016		53	5
Forwards
9	Budu Zivzivadze	(Georgia (country))	FW	10 March 1994 (aged 24)	on loan from Esbjerg	2018	2018	41	28
14	Mate Vatsadze	(Georgia (country))	FW	17 December 1988 (aged 29)	Silkeborg	2018	2018		
17	Mikheil Ergemlidze	(Georgia (country))	FW	28 September 1999 (aged 19)	Academy	2017		29	1
23	Tamaz Babunadze	(Georgia (country))	FW	4 January 2000 (aged 18)	Academy	2018		8	0
26	Teimuraz Gabunia	(Georgia (country))	FW	10 February 2000 (aged 18)	Locomotive Tbilisi	2018		0	0
Players away on loan
Left during the season
1	Oto Goshadze	(Georgia (country))	GK	13 October 1997 (aged 21)	on loan from Saburtalo Tbilisi	2018	2018	0	0
16	Giorgi Tevzadze	(Georgia (country))	DF	25 August 1996 (aged 22)	Saburtalo Tbilisi	2015		58	4
20	Nika Dzalamidze	(Georgia (country))	MF	6 January 1992 (aged 26)	Juventus București	2018		10	2

== Transfers ==
=== In ===
Date	Position	Nationality	Name	From	Fee	Ref.
3 January 2018	FW	(Georgia (country))	Giorgi Ivanishvili	Chikhura Sachkhere	Undisclosed	
12 February 2018	DF	(Russia)	Guja Rukhaia	Sibir Novosibirsk	Undisclosed	
12 February 2018	MF	(Ukraine)	Dmytro Ivanisenya	Illichivets Mariupol	Undisclosed	
5 July 2018	FW	(Georgia (country))	Mate Vatsadze	Silkeborg IF	Undisclosed	
6 July 2018	GK	(Moldova)	Ștefan Sicaci	Afips Afipsky	Undisclosed	
15 August 2018	MF	(Georgia (country))	Levan Shengelia	Tubize-Braine	Undisclosed	
13 September 2018	MF	(Nigeria)	Luqman Gilmore	Imereti Khoni	Undisclosed	

=== Loans in ===
Date from	Position	Nationality	Name	From	Date to	Ref.
1 January 2018	GK	(Georgia (country))	Oto Goshadze	Saburtalo Tbilisi	25 June 2018	
9 January 2018	FW	(Georgia (country))	Budu Zivzivadze	Esbjerg fB	31 December 2018	
29 March 2018	DF	(Georgia (country))	Luka Lochoshvili	Dynamo Kyiv		

=== Out ===
Date	Position	Nationality	Name	To	Fee	Ref.
31 July 2018	MF	(Georgia (country))	Otar Kiteishvili	Sturm Graz	Undisclosed	

=== Released ===
Date	Position	Nationality	Name	Joined	Date	Ref.
11 June 2018	DF	(Georgia (country))	Giorgi Tevzadze	MSK Zilina	12 June 2018	
15 June 2018	MF	(Georgia (country))	Nika Dzalamidze	Baltika Kaliningrad		

== Friendlies ==
2018	–
GET (UTC+4)

== Competitions ==
=== Overview ===
Competition	First match	Last match	Starting round	Final position	Record							
Competition	First match	Last match	Starting round	Final position	Pld	W	D	L	GF	GA	GD	Win %
Erovnuli Liga	5 March 2018	8 December 2018	Matchday 1	Runnersup	36	21	6	9	73	38	+35	58.33
Georgian Cup	13 June 2018	7 November 2018	Third round	Semifinal	4	2	1	1	11	6	+5	50.00
UEFA Europa League	12 July 2018	19 July 2018	First qualifying round	First qualifying round	2	0	1	1	2	3	−1	0.00
Total					42	23	8	11	86	47	+39	54.76

Last updated: 8 December 2018
Source: Competitions

=== Erovnuli Liga ===
==== Results summary ====
Overall								Home						Away					
Pld	W	D	L	GF	GA	GD	Pts	W	D	L	GF	GA	GD	W	D	L	GF	GA	GD
36	21	6	9	73	38	+35	69	10	2	6	31	19	+12	11	4	3	42	19	+23

Last updated: 8 December 2018.
Source: See Results

==== Results by round ====
Round	1	2	3	4	5	6	7	8	9	10	11	12	13	14	15	16	17	18	19	20	21	23	24	25	26	27	28	29	30	22	31	32	33	34	35	36
Ground	H	A	H	H	A	H	A	H	A	A	H	A	A	H	A	H	A	H	H	A	H	A	H	A	H	A	A	H	A	H	A	H	A	H	A	H
Result	L	W	W	W	W	L	W	W	D	W	L	W	D	W	L	W	W	W	W	W	D	W	W	D	W	L	W	D	W	L	D	L	L	W	W	L
Position	7	4	3	2	2	2	2	2	2	2	2	2	2	2	3	2	2	2	2	2	2	2	2	2	2	2	2	2	2	2	2	2	2	2	2	2
Points	0	3	6	9	12	12	15	18	19	22	22	25	26	29	29	32	35	38	41	44	45	48	51	52	55	55	58	59	62	62	63	63	63	66	69	69

Source: See Results
A = Away; H = Home; W = Win; D = Draw; L = Loss

==== Results ====
5 March 2018 1	Dinamo Tbilisi	1–2	Rustavi	Tbilisi
18:00 GET (UTC+4)	Rukhaia (yellow card) 72'; Kiteishvili (yellow card) 76'; Zivzivadze 84' (pen.); Kobouri (yellow card) 85'	Report	Kobakhidze (yellow card) 54'; Poniava (yellow card) 67'; Gabulov 68'; Kvirkvia (yellow card) 72'; Gegetchkori (yellow card) 84'; Mikeltadze 86' (pen.)	Stadium: Dinamo Arena; Referee: G.Kikacheishvili

11 March 2018 2	Locomotive Tbilisi	1–4	Dinamo Tbilisi	Tbilisi
14:00 GET (UTC+4)	Shonia 21'	Report	Rukhaia (yellow card) 28'; Kiteishvili 40', 83'; Ivanishvili 44'; Shulaia 54'	Stadium: Mikheil Meskhi-2 Stadium; Referee: I.Kvirikashvili

16 March 2018 3	Dinamo Tbilisi	3–1	Samtredia	Tbilisi
17:00 GET (UTC+4)	Zivzivadze 10'; Shulaia 13'; Kutsia 84'	Report	Kirkitadze (yellow card) 81'; Bachiashvili (yellow card) 85'; Weijl 89' (pen.)	Stadium: Dinamo Arena; Referee: G.Kruashvili

1 April 2018 4	Dinamo Tbilisi	2–0	Torpedo Kutaisi	Tbilisi
16:00 GET (UTC+4)	Zivzivadze 12', 45+3'; Buliskeria (yellow card) 45+2'; Kutsia (yellow card) 77'	Report	Kutalia (yellow card) 57'	Stadium: Dinamo Arena; Referee: P.Macharadze

5 April 2018 5	Chikhura Sachkhere	1–2	Dinamo Tbilisi	Tbilisi
16:00 GET (UTC+4)	Gabedava 18' (penalty missed) 69'; Mirtskhulava (yellow card) 21'	Report	Dzalamidze 4'; Zivzivadze (penalty missed) 14'; Kiteishvili 22' (yellow card) 84'; Kharabadze (yellow card) 68'; Shulaia (yellow card) 90+3'	Stadium: David Petriashvili Arena; Referee: J.Khorava

15 April 2018 6	Dinamo Tbilisi	0–1	Saburtalo	Tbilisi
16:00 GET (UTC+4)	Kharabadze (yellow card) 78'	Report	Gorgiashvili 28' 63'; Mamuchashvili (yellow card) 53'; Tera (yellow card) 80'	Stadium: Dinamo Arena; Referee: I.Kvirikashvili

21 April 2018 7	Sioni Bolnisi	1–2	Dinamo Tbilisi	Tbilisi
16:30 GET (UTC+4)	Nozadze (yellow card) 52'; Mikaberidze 56'; Dvali (yellow card) 58'	Report	Ivanisenya (yellow card) 55'; Rukhaia 70'; Ninua 73'	Stadium: Mikheil Meskhi-2 Stadium; Referee: A.Nonikashvili

27 April 2018 8	Dinamo Tbilisi	4–1	Kolkheti-1913 Poti	Tbilisi
18:30 GET (UTC+4)	Zivzivadze 13' (penalty missed) 54'; Ninua (yellow card) 32'; Kiteishvili 39' (pen.), 47'; Kharabadze 85'	Report	Gogberashvili (yellow card) 28'; Gogonaia (yellow card) 47' (goal) 82'; Danilov (yellow card) 53'	Stadium: Dinamo Arena; Referee: G.Avazashvili

2 May 2018 9	Dila Gori	1–1	Dinamo Tbilisi	Gori
20:30 GET (UTC+4)	Nonikashvili 33'; Razmadze (yellow card) 72' (yellow-red card) 75'; Kovtalyuk (yellow card) 90+4'	Report	Ivanisenya (yellow card) 19'; Zivzivadze 24'; Totadze (yellow card) 58' (yellow-red card) 90+4'; Buliskeria (yellow card) 90+4'	Stadium: Tengiz Burjanadze Stadium; Referee: J.Khorava

6 May 2018 10	Rustavi	0–2	Dinamo Tbilisi	Tbilisi
18:30 GET (UTC+4)	Tskhovrebov (yellow card) 65'; Khadartsev (yellow card) 72'	Report	Shulaia 60'; Kiteishvili 66' (pen.)	Stadium: Mikheil Meskhi Stadium; Referee: G.Vadachkoria

13 May 2018 11	Dinamo Tbilisi	0–1	Locomotive Tbilisi	Tbilisi
16:00 GET (UTC+4)		Report	Jikia 29'; Dzebniauri (yellow card) 35'; Injgia (yellow card) 85'	Stadium: Dinamo Arena; Referee: G.Kruashvili

19 May 2018 12	Samtredia	1–2	Dinamo Tbilisi	Lanchkhuti
17:00 GET (UTC+4)	Karkuzashvili (yellow card) 52' (yellow-red card) 68'; Ninua 90+2'	Report	Kiteishvili 40'; Kharabadze (yellow card) 45'; Ivanisenya 70'; Shulaia (yellow card) 76'; Lochoshvili (yellow card) 83'; Totadze (yellow card) 88'	Stadium: Evgrapi Shevardnadze Stadium; Referee: P.Macharadze

25 May 2018 13	Torpedo Kutaisi	1–1	Dinamo Tbilisi	Kutaisi
20:30 GET (UTC+4)	Kutalia 6'	Report	Shulaia 15'; Ninua (yellow card) 54'; Lochoshvili (yellow card) 71'	Stadium: Ramaz Shengelia Stadium; Referee: G.Kruashvili

10 June 2018 14	Dinamo Tbilisi	1–0	Chikhura Sachkhere	Tbilisi
20:30 GET (UTC+4)	Ivanisenya 9'	Report		Stadium: Dinamo Arena; Referee: J.Khorava

17 June 2018 15	Saburtalo	1–0	Dinamo Tbilisi	Tbilisi
20:30 GET (UTC+4)	Gonçalves 90+2'	Report		Stadium: Mikheil Meskhi Stadium; Referee: D.Kharitonashvili

23 June 2018 16	Dinamo Tbilisi	2–1	Sioni Bolnisi	Tbilisi
20:00 GET (UTC+4)	Kharabadze 39'; Kutsia (yellow card) 79'; Lochoshvili (yellow card) 85'; Ivanisenya (yellow card) 90+1'; Giorbelidze 90+2' (o.g.)	Report	Mikaberidze 54' (yellow card) 59'; Sikharulia (yellow card) 75'; Gureshidze (yellow card) 90'	Stadium: Dinamo Arena; Referee: G.Avazashvili

29 June 2018 17	Kolkheti-1913 Poti	3–6	Dinamo Tbilisi	Zestaponi
19:30 GET (UTC+4)	Ponomaryov (yellow card) 17'; Mikhalyov 33' (yellow card) 38'; Kvasov (yellow card) 35' (goal) 75'; Gogberashvili (yellow card) 68'; Imnadze 80'; Gogonaia (yellow card) 90+1'	Report	Totadze 42'; Ivanishvili (yellow card) 50'; Kiteishvili 59', 85'; Kharabadze 69'; Ergemlidze 82'; Ninua 89'	Stadium: David Abashidze Stadium; Referee: G.Kruashvili

5 July 2018 18	Dinamo Tbilisi	5–0	Dila Gori	Tbilisi
21:00 GET (UTC+4)	Kiteishvili 15', 39'; Totadze 22'; Zivzivadze 26', 59'	Report	Razmadze (yellow card) 22'; Sukhiashvili (red card) 54'; Nonikashvili (yellow card) 61'	Stadium: Dinamo Arena; Referee: G.Vadachkoria

3 August 2018 19	Dinamo Tbilisi	2–1	Rustavi	Tbilisi
20:00 GET (UTC+4)	Shulaia 18'; Ninua 34'; Kobouri (yellow card) 90+2'	Report	Lobjanidze (yellow card) 39' (goal) 90'; Kirkitadze (yellow card) 48'	Stadium: Dinamo Arena; Referee: G.Vadachkoria

12 August 2018 20	Locomotive Tbilisi	2–4	Dinamo Tbilisi	Tbilisi
17:00 GET (UTC+4)	Gavashelishvili 57', 77'	Report	Zivzivadze 14', 34', 48'; Ivanisenya 39'; Kardava (yellow card) 66'	Stadium: Mikheil Meskhi-2 Stadium; Referee: P.Macharadze

18 August 2018 21	Dinamo Tbilisi	0–0	Samtredia	Tbilisi
20:00 GET (UTC+4)	Totadze (yellow card) 41'; Lochoshvili (yellow card) 69'	Report	Gogiashvili (yellow card) 71'; Jgerenaia (yellow card) 88'	Stadium: Dinamo Arena; Referee: G.Kruashvili

31 August 2018 23	Chikhura Sachkhere	1–2	Dinamo Tbilisi	Sachkhere
17:00 GET (UTC+4)	Gabedava 28'; Chikvaidze (yellow card) 50'; Dobrovolski (yellow card) 57'	Report	Zivzivadze 7'; Ninua (penalty missed) 55'; Kutsia (yellow card) 66' (goal) 72'; Rukhaia (yellow card) 79'	Stadium: Central Stadium; Referee: J.Khorava

16 September 2018 24	Dinamo Tbilisi	2–1	Saburtalo	Tbilisi
16:00 GET (UTC+4)	Kobouri (yellow card) 23'; Rekhviashvili 58' (o.g.); Kharabadze (yellow card) 82'; Shengelia 90+3'	Report	Rekhviashvili (yellow card) 33'; Margvelashvili 45+4'; Kupatadze (yellow card) 45+4'; Lakvekheliani (yellow card) 87'	Stadium: Dinamo Arena; Referee: J.Khorava

23 September 2018 25	Sioni Bolnisi	0–0	Dinamo Tbilisi	Tbilisi
16:00 GET (UTC+4)	Gureshidze (yellow card) 5'; Datunaishvili (yellow card) 44'; Koshkadze (yellow card) 53'; Makharoblidze (yellow card) 80'	Report	Shengelia (yellow card) 67'	Stadium: Mikheil Meskhi-2 Stadium; Referee: G.Kruashvili

27 September 2018 26	Dinamo Tbilisi	2–1	Kolkheti-1913 Poti	Tbilisi
18:00 GET (UTC+4)	Shengelia 17', 54'; Lochoshvili (yellow card) 85'; Ergemlidze (yellow card) 90+3'	Report	Ashortia 24'; Imnadze (yellow card) 37'	Stadium: Dinamo Arena; Referee: G.Kikacheishvili

30 September 2018 27	Dila Gori	1–0	Dinamo Tbilisi	Gori
19:00 GET (UTC+4)	Kovtalyuk 74'; Chaduneli (yellow card) 76'; Grigalashvili (yellow card) 90+4'	Report	Ivanisenya (yellow card) 56'	Stadium: Tengiz Burjanadze Stadium; Referee: G.Vadachkoria

7 October 2018 28	Rustavi	0–3	Dinamo Tbilisi	Tbilisi
15:30 GET (UTC+4)	Bugulov (yellow card) 62'; Chukwura (yellow card) 63' (yellow-red card) 67'	Report	Rukhaia (yellow card) 27'; Shulaia 31'; Zivzivadze 45+1', 80'; Kutsia (yellow card) 55'; Ivanisenya (yellow card) 56'	Stadium: Mikheil Meskhi Stadium; Referee: I.Kvirikashvili

21 October 2018 29	Dinamo Tbilisi	0–0	Locomotive Tbilisi	Tbilisi
16:00 GET (UTC+4)		Report		Stadium: Dinamo Arena; Referee: G.Vadachkoria

27 October 2018 30	Samtredia	1–8	Dinamo Tbilisi	Zestaponi
18:00 GET (UTC+4)	Lipartia 43'; Gogiashvili (yellow card) 47'	Report	Shulaia 20', 61'; Vatsadze 33'; Zivzivadze 41', 69'; Totadze 48'; Ivanishvili 72', 88'	Stadium: David Abashidze Stadium; Referee: P.Macharadze

31 October 2018 22	Dinamo Tbilisi	0–1	Torpedo Kutaisi	Tbilisi
20:00 GET (UTC+4)	Ninua (yellow card) 34'; Lochoshvili (yellow card) 60'; Kutsia (yellow card) 82'	Report	Kapanadze 9' (yellow card) 45+1'; Daffé (yellow card) 45'; Kutalia (yellow card) 85'	Stadium: Dinamo Arena; Referee: G.Kruashvili

4 November 2018 31	Torpedo Kutaisi	2–2	Dinamo Tbilisi	Kutaisi
18:00 GET (UTC+4)	Tsintsadze 88'; Kapanadze 90+2'	Report	Rukhaia (yellow card) 35'; Vatsadze 60' (yellow card) 89'; Shengelia (yellow card) 67'; Kharabadze 77'	Stadium: Ramaz Shengelia Stadium; Referee: J.Khorava

11 November 2018 32	Dinamo Tbilisi	1–4	Chikhura Sachkhere	Tbilisi
18:00 GET (UTC+4)	Shengelia 70'	Report	Sardalishvili 11'; Megrelishvili (yellow card) 45+2'; Gabedava 46', 51', 90+3'; Maisashvili (yellow card) 56'; Kakhabrishvili (yellow card) 63'	Stadium: Dinamo Arena; Referee: G.Vadachkoria

26 November 2018 33	Saburtalo	2–1	Dinamo Tbilisi	Tbilisi
19:00 GET (UTC+4)	Kokhreidze 20' (pen.); Gonçalves 24' (yellow card) 50'; Chabradze (yellow card) 60'; Goshteliani (yellow card) 66'	Report	Zivzivadze 14' (yellow card) 58'; Totadze (yellow card) 26'	Stadium: Mikheil Meskhi Stadium; Referee: G.Kruashvili

30 November 2018 34	Dinamo Tbilisi	5–2	Sioni Bolnisi	Tbilisi
17:00 GET (UTC+4)	Shulaia 25'; Zivzivadze 43', 48', 62', 69'	Report	Datunaishvili 29'; Khetsuriani 45'	Stadium: Dinamo Arena; Referee: J.Khorava

4 December 2018 35	Kolkheti-1913 Poti	0–2	Dinamo Tbilisi	Zestaponi
13:00 GET (UTC+4)		Report	Shengelia 19'; Zivzivadze 78'	Stadium: David Abashidze Stadium; Referee: P.Macharadze

8 December 2018 36	Dinamo Tbilisi	1–2	Dila Gori	Tbilisi
14:00 GET (UTC+4)	Shulaia 58'; Totadze (yellow card) 90+4'	Report	Kovtalyuk 18' (yellow card) 20'; Razmadze (yellow card) 52'; Gadrani 57'; Koripadze (yellow card) 82'; Chaduneli (yellow card) 90+4'	Stadium: Dinamo Arena; Referee: I.Kvirikashvili

==== League table ====
Pos	Team	Pld	W	D	L	GF	GA	GD	Pts	Qualification or relegation
1	Saburtalo Tbilisi (C)	36	24	7	5	64	29	+35	79	Qualification for the Champions League first qualifying round
2	Dinamo Tbilisi	36	21	6	9	73	38	+35	69	Qualification for the Europa League first qualifying round (Note: Since the winners of 2018 Georgian Cup, Torpedo Kutaisi, qualified for European competition based on their league position, the spot awarded to the Cup winner (Europa League first qualifying round) was passed to the next best-placed team (the fourth-placed team).)
3	Torpedo Kutaisi	36	20	9	7	66	25	+41	69	Qualification for the Europa League first qualifying round
4	Chikhura Sachkhere	36	19	7	10	54	33	+21	64	Qualification for the Europa League first qualifying round
5	Dila Gori	36	17	12	7	60	40	+20	63	

Source: Erovnuli Liga (in Georgian), Soccerway
Rules for classification: 1) Points; 2) Head-to-head points; 3) Head-to-head goal difference; 4) Head-to-head goals scored; 5) Head-to-head away goals scored (only if two teams); 6) Goal difference; 7) Goals scored.
(C) Champions

=== Georgian Cup ===
13 June 2018 Third round	Locomotive Tbilisi	4–4 (a.e.t.) (3–5 p)	Dinamo Tbilisi	Tbilisi
17:00 GET (UTC+4)	Gabadze (yellow card) 29'; Kikabidze 49'; Ardazishvili 83'; Gavashelishvili 90' (yellow card) 116'; Tchanturia (yellow card) 90+2'; Samurkasovi (yellow card) 95'; Ubilava (yellow card) 100'; Kobakhidze (yellow card) 105+1'; Ardazishvili 120+2'	Report	Dzalamidze 4'; Ivanisenya 38' (yellow card) 65'; Shulaia (yellow card) 78'; Kiteishvili 87'; Babunadze 99'; Ninua (yellow card) 103'; Buliskeria (yellow card) 119'	Stadium: Mikheil Meskhi-2 Stadium; Referee: G.Vadachkoria
	Penalties
	Samurkasovi (penalty scored); Tchanturia (penalty missed); Gvalia (penalty scored); Kobakhidze (penalty scored)		(penalty scored) Kiteishvili; (penalty scored) Totadze; (penalty scored) Shulaia; (penalty scored) Ninua; (penalty scored) Ivanisenya

19 September 2018 Fourth round	Merani Martvili	1–2	Dinamo Tbilisi	Martvili
15:30 GET (UTC+4)	Tkeshelashvili (yellow card) 24'; Dugu (yellow card) 40'; Tsimakuridze 90+1'	Report	Totadze (yellow card) 17'; Zivzivadze 27', 79'	Stadium: Murtaz Khurtsilava Stadium; Referee: I.Kvirikashvili

3 October 2018 Quarter–final	Guria Lanchkhuti	0–5	Dinamo Tbilisi	Lanchkhuti
15:00 GET (UTC+4)	Gagnidze (yellow card) 44'; Tsilosani (yellow card) 47'; Jojua (yellow card) 51'; Nariashvili (yellow card) 63'	Report	Shengelia 58'; Ivanishvili 60'; Totadze 68' (pen.); Zivzivadze 70', 71'	Stadium: Evgrapi Shevardnadze Stadium; Referee: G.Avazashvili

7 November 2018 Semi–final	Gagra	1–0 (a.e.t.)	Dinamo Tbilisi	Tbilisi
14:00 GET (UTC+4)	Matiashvili 105+1'; Papava (yellow card) 119'	Report	Ninua (yellow card) 62'; Kobouri (yellow card) 111'	Stadium: David Petriashvili Arena; Referee: A.Nonikashvili

=== UEFA Europa League ===
==== Qualifying rounds ====
12 July 2018 First qualifying round 1st leg	DAC Dunajská Streda (Slovakia)	1–1	(Georgia (country)) Dinamo Tbilisi	Dunajská Streda, Slovakia
23:00 GET (UTC+4)	Bayo 30' (yellow card) 54'	Report	Zivzivadze 15'; Buliskeria (yellow card) 90+1'	Stadium: MOL Aréna; Attendance: 8,759; Referee: Irfan Peljto (Bosnia and Herzegovina)

19 July 2018 First qualifying round 2nd leg	Dinamo Tbilisi (Georgia (country))	1–2 (2–3 agg.)	(Slovakia) DAC Dunajská Streda	Tbilisi, Georgia
21:00 GET (UTC+4)	Zivzivadze 41'; Lochoshvili (yellow card) 77'; Kiteishvili (yellow card) 90+7'	Report	Ljubičić (yellow card) 60'; Bayo (yellow card) 67' (goal) 86', 90+4'; M.Vida (yellow card) 90+3'	Stadium: Dinamo Arena; Attendance: 6,111; Referee: Dimitar Mečkarovski (Macedonia)

== Squad statistics ==
As of match played 8 December 2018

=== Appearances and goals ===
No.	Pos	Nat	Player	Total		Erovnuli Liga		Georgian Cup		UEFA Europa League	
No.	Pos	Nat	Player	Apps	Goals	Apps	Goals	Apps	Goals	Apps	Goals
2	DF	(Russia) RUS	Guja Rukhaia	41	1	34+1	1	4	0	2	0
3	DF	(Georgia (country)) GEO	Lasha Totadze	34	4	31	3	3	1	0	0
4	DF	(Georgia (country)) GEO	Luka Lochoshvili	25	0	18+3	0	1+1	0	2	0
5	DF	(Georgia (country)) GEO	Davit Kobouri	40	0	34	0	4	0	2	0
6	MF	(Georgia (country)) GEO	Bakar Kardava	18	0	6+10	0	0+1	0	0+1	0
7	MF	(Georgia (country)) GEO	Giorgi Zaria	10	0	3+6	0	1	0	0	0
8	MF	(Georgia (country)) GEO	Giorgi Kutsia	21	2	13+6	2	2	0	0	0
9	FW	(Georgia (country)) GEO	Budu Zivzivadze	40	28	34+1	22	2+1	4	2	2
11	MF	(Georgia (country)) GEO	Akaki Shulaia	36	10	32	10	1+1	0	2	0
13	GK	(Georgia (country)) GEO	Demetre Buliskeria	24	0	18	0	4	0	2	0
14	FW	(Georgia (country)) GEO	Mate Vatsadze	15	2	7+5	2	1	0	0+2	0
15	MF	(Georgia (country)) GEO	Lasha Kochladze	20	0	4+13	0	1+2	0	0	0
17	FW	(Georgia (country)) GEO	Mikheil Ergemlidze	26	1	3+18	1	2+1	0	1+1	0
18	MF	(Ukraine) UKR	Dmytro Ivanisenya	39	4	31+2	3	4	1	2	0
19	DF	(Georgia (country)) GEO	Levan Kharabadze	37	4	27+4	4	4	0	2	0
21	MF	(Georgia (country)) GEO	Giorgi Ivanishvili	32	4	17+9	3	3+1	1	1+1	0
22	MF	(Georgia (country)) GEO	Beka Dartsmelia	3	0	1+2	0	0	0	0	0
23	MF	(Georgia (country)) GEO	Tamaz Babunadze	8	1	0+7	0	0+1	1	0	0
24	MF	(Georgia (country)) GEO	Paata Kiteishvili	1	0	0+1	0	0	0	0	0
27	MF	(Georgia (country)) GEO	Levan Shengelia	19	6	13+3	5	3	1	0	0
29	MF	(Nigeria) NGR	Luqman Gilmore	2	0	0	0	0+2	0	0	0
30	DF	(Georgia (country)) GEO	Luka Kapianidze	4	0	3	0	1	0	0	0
32	MF	(Georgia (country)) GEO	Nika Ninua	35	3	27+2	3	2+2	0	2	0
44	DF	(Georgia (country)) GEO	Tornike Dzotsenidze	3	0	3	0	0	0	0	0
88	GK	(Moldova) MDA	Ștefan Sicaci	18	0	18	0	0	0	0	0
Players away from Dinamo Tbilisi on loan:
Players who left Dinamo Tbilisi during the season:
10	MF	(Georgia (country)) GEO	Otar Kiteishvili	21	12	18	11	0+1	1	2	0
16	DF	(Georgia (country)) GEO	Giorgi Tevzadze	1	0	0+1	0	0	0	0	0
20	MF	(Georgia (country)) GEO	Nika Dzalamidze	10	2	1+8	1	1	1	0	0

=== Goal scorers ===
Place	Position	Nation	Number	Name	Erovnuli Liga	Georgian Cup	UEFA Europa League	Total
1	FW	(Georgia (country))	9	Budu Zivzivadze	22	4	2	28
2	MF	(Georgia (country))	10	Otar Kiteishvili	11	1	0	12
3	MF	(Georgia (country))	11	Akaki Shulaia	10	0	0	10
4	MF	(Georgia (country))	27	Levan Shengelia	5	1	0	6
5	DF	(Georgia (country))	19	Levan Kharabadze	4	0	0	4
5	MF	(Ukraine)	18	Dmytro Ivanisenya	3	1	0	4
5	MF	(Georgia (country))	21	Giorgi Ivanishvili	3	1	0	4
5	DF	(Georgia (country))	3	Lasha Totadze	3	1	0	4
9	MF	(Georgia (country))	32	Nika Ninua	3	0	0	3
10	MF	(Georgia (country))	8	Giorgi Kutsia	2	0	0	2
10	FW	(Georgia (country))	14	Mate Vatsadze	2	0	0	2
10	MF	(Georgia (country))	20	Nika Dzalamidze	1	1	0	2
10				Own goal	2	0	0	2
14	DF	(Russia)	2	Guja Rukhaia	1	0	0	1
14	FW	(Georgia (country))	17	Mikheil Ergemlidze	1	0	0	1
14	MF	(Georgia (country))	23	Tamaz Babunadze	0	1	0	1
				TOTALS	73	11	2	0

=== Clean sheets ===
Place	Position	Nation	Number	Name	Erovnuli Liga	Georgian Cup	UEFA Europa League	Total
1	GK	(Moldova)	88	Ștefan Sicaci	5	0	0	5
1	GK	(Georgia (country))	13	Demetre Buliskeria	4	1	0	5
				TOTALS	9	1	0	10

=== Disciplinary record ===
Number	Nation	Position	Name	Erovnuli Liga		Georgian Cup		UEFA Europa League		Total	
Number	Nation	Position	Name	Yellow card	Red card	Yellow card	Red card	Yellow card	Red card	Yellow card	Red card
2	(Russia)	DF	Guja Rukhaia	5	0	0	0	0	0	5	0
3	(Georgia (country))	DF	Lasha Totadze	4	1	1	0	0	0	5	1
4	(Georgia (country))	DF	Luka Lochoshvili	4	0	0	0	1	0	5	0
5	(Georgia (country))	DF	Davit Kobouri	3	0	1	0	0	0	4	0
6	(Georgia (country))	MF	Bakar Kardava	1	0	0	0	0	0	1	0
8	(Georgia (country))	MF	Giorgi Kutsia	4	0	0	0	0	0	4	0
9	(Georgia (country))	FW	Budu Zivzivadze	1	0	0	0	0	0	1	0
11	(Georgia (country))	MF	Akaki Shulaia	2	0	1	0	0	0	3	0
13	(Georgia (country))	GK	Demetre Buliskeria	2	0	1	0	1	0	3	0
14	(Georgia (country))	FW	Mate Vatsadze	1	0	0	0	0	0	1	0
17	(Georgia (country))	FW	Mikheil Ergemlidze	1	0	0	0	0	0	1	0
18	(Ukraine)	MF	Dmytro Ivanisenya	4	0	1	0	0	0	5	0
19	(Georgia (country))	DF	Levan Kharabadze	3	0	0	0	0	0	3	0
21	(Georgia (country))	MF	Giorgi Ivanishvili	1	0	0	0	0	0	1	0
27	(Georgia (country))	MF	Levan Shengelia	1	0	0	0	0	0	1	0
32	(Georgia (country))	MF	Nika Ninua	2	0	2	0	0	0	4	0
Players away on loan:
Players who left Dinamo Tbilisi during the season:
10	(Georgia (country))	MF	Otar Kiteishvili	2	0	0	0	1	0	3	0
			TOTALS	41	1	7	0	3	0	51	1
