= 2021–22 FC Van season =

Van
2021-22 season
- Manager: Artur Asoyan (until 18 February); Sevada Arzumanyan (from 19 February)
- Stadium: Charentsavan City Stadium
- Premier League: 8th
- Armenian Cup: Semifinal vs Urartu
- Top goalscorer: League: Zaven Badoyan (4); All: Zaven Badoyan (4)

The 2021–22 season was FC Van's second season in the Armenian Premier League.

== Season events ==
On 31 May, Van announced the signing of Arman Meliksetyan.

On 28 June, Erik Azizyan joined Van on a season-long loan deal from Pyunik.

On 2 July, Van announced the signings of Aleksandr Stepanov from Lori and Dmitri Kuzkin from Zvezda St.Petersburg.

On 15 July, Van announced the signing of Luis Menezes from Paraná.

On 19 July, Van announced the signing of Vladimir Filippov from Zvezda St.Petersburg.

On 7 August, Van announced the signing of Ernist Batyrkanov from Kyzylzhar.

On 18 August, Van announced the signing of Bruno Miguel from Rio Preto.

On 17 September, Van announced the signings of Norik Mkrtchyan from Kaluga, and Pascal Chidi from Khor Fakkan.

On 13 October, Van announced the signing of Emile N'dri Koukou.

On 27 December, Bruno Miguel, Ededem Essien, Luis Menezes, Stéphane Adjouman, Mykola Tsyhan and Ernist Batyrkanov all left Van.

On 2 February, Van announced the departures of Andranik Voskanyan, Gagik Daghbashyan, Akhmed Jindoyan and Vahagn Ayvazyan.

On 4 February, Van announced the signing of Benik Hovhannisyan who'd previously left Noah and Shota Gvazava from Slutsk. The following day, 5 February, Kakha Kakhabrishvili joined from Locomotive Tbilisi.

On 7 February, Van announced the signing of Jaisen Clifford from Cape Town All Stars, and free agent Edvard Avagyan.

On 9 February, Van announced the signings of Narek Hovhannisyan from Ararat-Armenia II and Ipehe Williams.

On 14 February, Van announced the signing of Silvio Gutierrez from Club Deportivo Estudiantes in Ecuador.

On 16 February, Van announced the signing of Domenico Coppola, whilst Emile N'dri Koukou and Norik Mkrtchyan left the club.

On 1 March, Van announced the signing of Alikhan Malkanduev from Shakhter Pietrykaw and Tengiz Tsikaridze from Zhetysu.

On 11 March, Van announced the signing of Benjamin Techie, who'd previously played in Armenia for Noravank.

On 16 March, Van announced the signing of Layonel Adams from Turan.

On 25 March, Van announced the signing of Jaber Issa from Al Raed.

== Squad ==
As of match played 28 May 2022

Number	Name	Nationality	Position	Date of birth (age)	Signed from	Signed in	Contract ends	Apps.	Goals
Goalkeepers
12	Arman Meliksetyan	(Armenia)	GK	21 July 1995 (aged 26)	Unattached	2021		18	0
21	David Papikyan	(Armenia)	GK	15 February 1999 (aged 23)	Torpedo Yerevan	2021		5	0
22	Domenico Coppola	(Italy)	GK	29 January 1999 (aged 23)	Unattached	2022		10	0
Defenders
2	Vaspurak Minasyan	(Armenia)	DF	29 June 1994 (aged 27)	loan from Pyunik	2022		15	0
3	Silvio Gutierrez	(Ecuador)	DF	28 February 1993 (aged 29)	Club Deportivo Estudiantes	2022		11	0
5	Layonel Adams	(Russia)	DF	9 August 1994 (aged 27)	Turan	2022		4	0
6	Argishti Petrosyan	(Armenia)	DF	16 October 1992 (aged 29)	Yerevan	2020			
19	Aleksandr Stepanov	(Russia)	DF	5 June 1996 (aged 25)	Lori	2021		32	1
23	Dmitri Kuzkin	(Russia)	DF	2 June 2000 (aged 21)	Zvezda St.Petersburg	2021		26	0
27	Josue Gaba	(Ivory Coast)	DF	12 January 2002 (aged 20)	Unattached	2020			
28	Alexander Hovhannisyan	(Armenia)	DF	20 July 1996 (aged 25)	Gandzasar Kapan	2021		27	0
Midfielders
7	Vladimir Filippov	(Russia)	MF	5 June 2001 (aged 20)	Zvezda St.Petersburg	2021		29	3
8	Shota Gvazava	(Georgia (country))	MF	26 October 1992 (aged 29)	Slutsk	2022		18	0
9	Kakha Kakhabrishvili	(Georgia (country))	MF	8 July 1993 (aged 28)	Locomotive Tbilisi	2022		14	2
10	Benik Hovhannisyan	(Armenia)	MF	1 May 1993 (aged 29)	Unattached	2022		12	0
11	Ipehe Williams	(Ivory Coast)	MF	7 August 2001 (aged 20)	Unattached	2022		17	0
13	Emmanuel Mireku	(Ghana)	MF	25 December 1997 (aged 24)	Unattached	2021		34	1
18	Narek Hovhannisyan	(Armenia)	MF	11 June 2002 (aged 19)	Ararat-Armenia II	2022		11	0
29	Michael Galstyan	(Armenia)	MF			2021		1	0
44	Jaber Issa	(Saudi Arabia)	MF	7 June 1997 (aged 24)	Al Raed	2022		1	0
70	Tengiz Tsikaridze	(Georgia (country))	MF	21 December 1995 (aged 26)	Zhetysu	2022		3	0
77	Erik Azizyan	(Armenia)	MF	4 March 2000 (aged 22)	loan from Pyunik	2021	2022	16	1
88	Zaven Badoyan	(Armenia)	MF	22 December 1989 (aged 32)	Ararat Yerevan	2021		14	4
90	Alikhan Malkanduev	(Russia)	MF	1 June 2002 (aged 19)	Shakhter Pietrykaw	2022		9	0
96	Edvard Avagyan	(Armenia)	MF	21 March 1996 (aged 26)	Unattached	2022		8	0
Forwards
35	Jaisen Clifford	(South Africa)	FW	4 February 1996 (aged 26)	Cape Town All Stars	2022		16	3
99	Benjamin Techie	(Ghana)	FW	10 December 1998 (aged 23)	Cheetah	2022		8	0
Players away on loan
Players who left during the season
2	Emile N'dri Koukou	(Ivory Coast)	DF	1 January 2003 (aged 19)		2021		2	0
3	Andranik Voskanyan	(Armenia)	DF	11 April 1990 (aged 32)	Urartu	2020			
5	Bruno Miguel	(Brazil)	MF	2 October 1996 (aged 25)	Rio Preto	2021		8	0
8	Gagik Daghbashyan	(Armenia)	DF	19 October 1990 (aged 31)	Alashkert	2021		10	0
9	Akhmed Jindoyan	(Armenia)	FW	2 October 1997 (aged 24)	Sevan	2021		11	0
10	Ededem Essien	(Nigeria)	MF	14 April 1998 (aged 24)	Unknown	2020			
11	Ernist Batyrkanov	(Kyrgyzstan)	FW	21 February 1998 (aged 24)	Kyzylzhar	2021		10	2
16	Luis Menezes	(Brazil)	MF	15 October 1996 (aged 25)	Paraná	2021		14	1
17	Stéphane Adjouman	(Ivory Coast)	MF	18 November 1998 (aged 23)	Gandzasar Kapan	2020			
18	Vahagn Ayvazyan	(Armenia)	DF	16 April 1992 (aged 30)	Urartu	2020		40	2
22	Mykola Tsyhan	(Ukraine)	GK	9 August 1984 (aged 37)	Novosibirsk	2021		8	0
44	Norik Mkrtchyan	(Russia)	MF	14 February 1999 (aged 23)	Kaluga	2021		3	0
99	Pascal Chidi	(Nigeria)	FW	23 November 2000 (aged 21)	Khor Fakkan	2021		8	0

== Transfers ==
=== In ===
Date	Position	Nationality	Name	From	Fee	Ref.
31 May 2021	GK	(Armenia)	Arman Meliksetyan	Unattached	Free	
2 July 2021	DF	(Russia)	Aleksandr Stepanov	Lori	Undisclosed	
2 July 2021	DF	(Russia)	Dmitri Kuzkin	Zvezda St.Petersburg	Undisclosed	
15 July 2021	MF	(Brazil)	Luis Menezes	Paraná	Undisclosed	
19 July 2021	MF	(Russia)	Vladimir Filippov	Zvezda St.Petersburg	Undisclosed	
30 July 2021	GK	(Ukraine)	Mykola Tsyhan	Novosibirsk	Undisclosed	
30 July 2021	DF	(Armenia)	Gagik Daghbashyan	Alashkert	Undisclosed	
31 July 2021	MF	(Armenia)	Zaven Badoyan	Ararat Yerevan	Undisclosed	
7 August 2021	FW	(Kyrgyzstan)	Ernist Batyrkanov	Kyzylzhar	Undisclosed	
18 August 2021	MF	(Brazil)	Bruno Miguel	Rio Preto	Undisclosed	
17 September 2021	MF	(Russia)	Norik Mkrtchyan	Kaluga	Undisclosed	
17 September 2021	FW	(Nigeria)	Pascal Chidi	Khor Fakkan	Undisclosed	
13 October 2021	DF	(Ivory Coast)	Emile N'dri Koukou	Unattached	Free	
4 February 2022	MF	(Armenia)	Benik Hovhannisyan	Unattached	Free	
4 February 2022	MF	(Georgia (country))	Shota Gvazava	Slutsk	Undisclosed	
5 February 2022	MF	(Georgia (country))	Kakha Kakhabrishvili	Locomotive Tbilisi	Undisclosed	
7 February 2022	FW	(South Africa)	Jaisen Clifford	Cape Town All Stars	Undisclosed	
7 February 2022	MF	(Armenia)	Edvard Avagyan	Unattached	Free	
9 February 2022	MF	(Armenia)	Narek Hovhannisyan	Ararat-Armenia II	Undisclosed	
9 February 2022	MF	(Ivory Coast)	Ipehe Williams	Unattached	Free	
14 February 2022	DF	(Ecuador)	Silvio Gutierrez	Club Deportivo Estudiantes	Undisclosed	
16 February 2022	GK	(Italy)	Domenico Coppola	Unattached	Free	
1 March 2022	MF	(Georgia (country))	Tengiz Tsikaridze	Zhetysu	Undisclosed	
1 March 2022	MF	(Russia)	Alikhan Malkanduev	Shakhter Pietrykaw	Undisclosed	
11 March 2022	FW	(Ghana)	Benjamin Techie	Cheetah	Undisclosed	
16 March 2022	DF	(Russia)	Layonel Adams	Turan	Undisclosed	
25 March 2022	MF	(Saudi Arabia)	Jaber Issa	Al Raed	Undisclosed	

=== Loans in ===
Date from	Position	Nationality	Name	From	Date to	Ref.
28 June 2021	MF	(Armenia)	Erik Azizyan	Pyunik	End of season	
17 February 2022	DF	(Armenia)	Vaspurak Minasyan	Pyunik	End of season	

=== Out ===
Date	Position	Nationality	Name	To	Fee	Ref.
15 June 2021	FW	(Armenia)	Edgar Movsesyan	Pyunik	Undisclosed	
25 June 2021	FW	(Ivory Coast)	Wilfried Eza	Van	Undisclosed	
1 July 2021	DF	(Nigeria)	Deou Dosa	Alashkert	Undisclosed	
1 July 2021	DF	(Russia)	Aleksandr Tenyayev	Saransk	Undisclosed	
1 July 2021	GK	(Russia)	Samur Agamagomedov	Legion Dynamo Makhachkala	Undisclosed	
1 July 2021	MF	(Russia)	Aleksey Shishkin	Khimik Dzerzhinsk	Undisclosed	
1 July 2021	FW	(Russia)	Aleksandr Maksimenko	Orsha	Undisclosed	
18 July 2021	MF	(Russia)	Andrei Zorin	Alga Bishkek	Undisclosed	

=== Released ===
Date	Position	Nationality	Name	Joined	Date	Ref.
27 December 2021	GK	(Ukraine)	Mykola Tsyhan	Lada-Tolyatti	15 February 2022	
27 December 2021	GK	(Brazil)	Luis Menezes	Brasil de Pelotas	21 January 2022	
27 December 2021	GK	(Brazil)	Bruno Miguel	Ekenäs IF	1 January 2022	
27 December 2021	GK	(Ivory Coast)	Stéphane Adjouman	Africa Sports	1 July 2022	
27 December 2021	GK	(Nigeria)	Ededem Essien	Al-Nasr		
27 December 2021	GK	(Kyrgyzstan)	Ernist Batyrkanov	Abdysh-Ata Kant	20 January 2022	
2 February 2022	DF	(Armenia)	Vahagn Ayvazyan	Alashkert	3 February 2022	
2 February 2022	DF	(Armenia)	Gagik Daghbashyan	Alashkert	3 February 2022	
2 February 2022	DF	(Armenia)	Andranik Voskanyan	Alashkert	3 February 2022	
2 February 2022	FW	(Armenia)	Akhmed Jindoyan			
11 February 2022	FW	(Nigeria)	Pascal Chidi	Dante Botoșani		
16 February 2022	DF	(Ivory Coast)	Emile N'dri Koukou			
16 February 2022	MF	(Russia)	Norik Mkrtchyan			

== Friendlies ==
22 January 2022	Noah	1–2	Van	Vagharshapat
13:00 (UTC+4)	S.Gomes	Report	Trialist; Badoyan	Stadium: Etchmiadzin Academy Stadium

29 January 2022	Van	1–0	Shirak	Charentsavan
14:00 (UTC+4)	Trialist	Report		Stadium: Charentsavan City Stadium

30 January 2022	Alashkert	0–0	Van	Yerevan
13:00 (UTC+4)		Report		Stadium: FFA Academy Stadium

4 February 2022	Van	2–2	Noravank	Charentsavan
14:00 (UTC+4)	Trialist; A.Hovhannisyan	Report	Goal	Stadium: Charentsavan City Stadium

== Competitions ==
=== Overall record ===
Competition	First match	Last match	Starting round	Final position	Record							
Competition	First match	Last match	Starting round	Final position	Pld	W	D	L	GF	GA	GD	Win %
Premier League	30 July 2021	28 May 2022	Matchday 1	8th	32	6	7	19	19	47	−28	18.75
Armenian Cup	15 September 2021	3 April 2022	First round	Semifinal	3	0	2	1	3	6	−3	0.00
Total					35	6	9	20	22	53	−31	17.14

Last updated: 28 May 2022
Source: Competitions

=== Premier League ===
==== Results summary ====
Overall								Home						Away					
Pld	W	D	L	GF	GA	GD	Pts	W	D	L	GF	GA	GD	W	D	L	GF	GA	GD
32	6	7	19	19	47	−28	25	5	3	8	13	21	−8	1	4	11	6	26	−20

Last updated: 28 May 2022 2021.
Source: See Results

==== Results by round ====
Round	1	2	3	4	5	6	7	8	9	10	11	12	13	14	15	16	17	18	19	20	21	22	23	24	25	26	27	28	29	30	31	32	33	34	35	36
Ground	A	H	A	H	A	H	H	A	H	H	A	H	A	H	A	A (Note: Between matchday 15 and 16, Sevan were expelled from the league.)	H	A	A	H	A	H	H	H	A	A	H	H	A	H	A	A	A	H	H	A
Result	V	L	W	W	D	L	L	L	D	V	L	L	L	L	L	L	W	L	V	L	L	D	D	W	D	L	L	V	D	L	D	L	L	W	W	L
Position	8	8	6	6	6	6	7	8	8	7	7	8	8	9	9	8	7	7	7	7	7	7	7	7	7	7	8	8	8	8	8	8	8	8	8	8

Updated to match(es) played on 28 May 2022. Source: See Results
A = Away; H = Home; W = Win; D = Draw; L = Loss; V = Void

==== Results ====
2 August 2021 1	Sevan	v	Van	Yerevan
17:00 (UTC+4)	Claudir 1'; A.Mensalão 31', 68', 84'; Kartashyan (yellow card) 34'; M.Sahakyan (yellow card) 36'; E.Jatta 79'	Report	Badoyan 21'; Stepanov (yellow card) 34'; Daghbashyan (yellow card) 38'; A.Jindoyan 47'	Stadium: Alashkert Stadium; Attendance: 0 Referee: Zaven Hovhannisyan
Note: Match declared void on 1 December 2021.

8 August 2021 2	Van	0–1	Ararat Yerevan	Charentsavan
17:00 (UTC+4)	E.Mireku (red card) 34'	Report	Déblé 53'	Stadium: Charentsavan City Stadium; Attendance: 700; Referee: Zaven Hovhannisyan

15 August 2021 3	Alashkert	0–2	Van	Yerevan
17:00 (UTC+4)	Yedigaryan (yellow card) 17'; N.Tankov (yellow card) 24'; Glišić (yellow card) 47'	Report	V.Ayvazyan (yellow card) 46'; Stepanov (yellow card) 47'; V.Filippov 51'; Badoyan 59'; Essien (yellow card) 81'	Stadium: Alashkert Stadium; Attendance: 250; Referee: Artem Gasparyan

19 August 2021 4	Van	1–0	BKMA Yerevan	Charentsavan
17:00 (UTC+4)	Essien (yellow card) 56'; Badoyan (yellow card) 60'; E.Mireku 89'	Report	A.Grigoryan (yellow card) 78'	Stadium: Charentsavan City Stadium; Attendance: 500; Referee: Henrik Nalbandyan

24 August 2021 5	Pyunik	1–1	Van	Yerevan
19:00 (UTC+4)	E.Vardanyan 17'; S.Grigoryan (yellow card) 61'; Gareginyan (yellow card) 84'; Bratkov (yellow card) 90+2'	Report	Badoyan 10'	Stadium: Republican Stadium; Attendance: 600; Referee: Artur Safaryan

12 September 2021 6	Van	1–2	Ararat-Armenia	Charentsavan
16:00 (UTC+4)	L.Menezes 34'	Report	Vakulenko (yellow card) 89'; Avanesyan 90+1'; Lima 90+4'; Wbeymar (yellow card) 90+7'; Ambartsumyan (yellow card) 90+7'	Stadium: Charentsavan City Stadium; Attendance: 600; Referee: Ashot Ghaltakchyan

22 September 2021 7	Van	1–2	Noah	Charentsavan
15:00 (UTC+4)	Badoyan 45'; D.Kuzkin (yellow card) 77'	Report	Karapetyan 5'; Kireyenko (yellow card) 52'; Paireli 70'; Gabarayev (yellow card) 74'; S.Gomes (yellow card) 74'; G.Matevosyan (yellow card) 82'	Stadium: Charentsavan City Stadium; Attendance: 800; Referee: Artur Safaryan

28 September 2021 8	Noravank	1–0	Van	Charentsavan
16:00 (UTC+4)	Orlov 23'; A.Asilyan (yellow card) 86'; K.Nalbandyan (yellow card) 88'; A.Mkrtchyan (yellow card) 90'	Report	Essien (yellow card) 56'; Stepanov (yellow card) 57'; Daghbashyan (yellow card) 77'	Stadium: Charentsavan City Stadium; Attendance: 500; Referee: Artur Safaryan

16 October 2021 9	Van	1–1	Urartu	Charentsavan
15:00 (UTC+4)	V.Filippov 12'; V.Ayvazyan (yellow card) 15'; S.Adjouman (yellow card) 71'; A.Hovhannisyan (red card) 78'	Report	Polyakov 62'; S.Mkrtchyan (yellow card) 90+4'	Stadium: Charentsavan City Stadium; Referee: Henrik Nalbandyan

22 October 2021 10	Van	v	Sevan	Charentsavan
15:00 (UTC+4)	E.Mireku (yellow card) 21'; Voskanyan (yellow card) 23'; J.Gaba (yellow card) 74'	Report	V.Muradyan (yellow card) 17'; L.Matheus (yellow card) 65'	Stadium: Charentsavan City Stadium; Attendance: 300; Referee: Zaven Hovhannisyan
Note: Match declared void on 1 December 2021.

26 October 2021 11	Ararat Yerevan	1–0	Van	Gyumri
13:45 (UTC+4)	Déblé 54'; Prljević (yellow card) 64'	Report	Stepanov (yellow card) 76'	Stadium: Gyumri City Stadium; Attendance: 50; Referee: Artur Tavakalyan

31 October 2021 12	Van	0–4	Alashkert	Charentsavan
15:00 (UTC+4)	D.Kuzkin (yellow card) 39'; A.Petrosyan (yellow card) 42'; Stepanov (yellow card) 57'	Report	Khurtsidze 23'; Jovanović 43' (yellow card) 69'; Milinković 81'; N.Tankov 88'; E.Soghomonyan (yellow card) 89'	Stadium: Charentsavan City Stadium; Attendance: 350; Referee: Shahen Aghayan

4 November 2021 13	BKMA Yerevan	1–0	Van	Yerevan
16:00 (UTC+4)	M.Mirzoyan 78'; S.Mkrtchyan (yellow card) 85'; G.Petrosyan (yellow card) 90+1'	Report		Stadium: FFA Academy Stadium; Attendance: 200; Referee: Henrik Nalbandyan

19 November 2021 14	Van	0–2	Pyunik	Charentsavan
14:00 (UTC+4)	A.Meliksetyan (yellow card) 5'; Batyrkanov (yellow card) 87'	Report	Firmino 6'; Šećerović (yellow card) 10'; Caraballo 32'; Bruno.N (yellow card) 85'; Meliksetyan (yellow card) 90+4'	Stadium: Charentsavan City Stadium; Attendance: 300; Referee: Ashot Ghaltakchyan

28 November 2021 15	Ararat-Armenia	2–0	Van	Yerevan
15:00 (UTC+4)	Bueno (red card) 7'; Muradyan (yellow card) 41'; Eza 86', 90+2'	Report	Bruno (penalty missed) 8'; E.Mireku (yellow card) 9' (yellow-red card) 44'; L.Menezes (yellow card) 18'; V.Ayvazyan (yellow card) 87'; J.Gaba (yellow card) 90+2'	Stadium: FFA Academy Stadium; Attendance: 300; Referee: Shahen Aghayan

5 December 2021 16	Noah	3–0	Van	Yerevan
15:00 (UTC+4)	C.Ikechukwu 3'; Gabarayev 33'; I.Smirnov (yellow card) 45'; Monroy (yellow card) 67'; Matviyenko 77'; A.Adamyan (yellow card) 90+1'	Report	J.Gaba (yellow card) 36'; Voskanyan (yellow card) 88'; A.Petrosyan (yellow card) 90+2'	Stadium: FFA Academy Stadium; Attendance: 200; Referee: Artem Gasparyan

10 December 2021 17	Van	2–0	Noravank	Charentsavan
14:00 (UTC+4)	Daghbashyan (yellow card) 8'; J.Gaba 78', 79'	Report	Ebert (yellow card) 24'; Mustafin (yellow card) 63'	Stadium: Charentsavan City Stadium; Referee: Zaven Hovhannisyan

20 February 2022 18	Urartu	1–0	Van	Yerevan
16:00 (UTC+4)	Miranyan 77'	Report	A.Petrosyan (yellow card) 76'; J.Gaba (yellow card) 90'	Stadium: Urartu-3 Stadium; Referee: Vardan Manukyan

24-26 February 2022 19	Sevan	BYE	Van	Yerevan
(UTC+4)				Stadium: Alashkert Stadium
Note: Sevan expelled from the league on 1 December 2021.

1 March 2022 20	Van	0–1	Ararat Yerevan	Charentsavan
17:00 (UTC+4)		Report	G.Malakyan 17'; Darbinyan (yellow card) 37'; Díaz (yellow card) 71'; Prljević (yellow card) 78'	Stadium: Charentsavan City Stadium; Referee: Shahen Aghayan

5 March 2022 21	Alashkert	2–0	Van	Yerevan
14:00 (UTC+4)	Yedigaryan 34' (yellow card) 47'; Fofana (yellow card) 41'; V.Ayvazyan 64'; Papikyan (yellow card) 68'	Report	E.Mireku (yellow card) 20'	Stadium: Alashkert Stadium

11 March 202 22	Van	1–1	BKMA Yerevan	Charentsavan
15:00 (UTC+4)	Stepanov (yellow card) 41'; E.Azizyan 90+2'	Report	Ishkhanyan (yellow card) 43'; E.Movsesyan 47'; N.Alaverdyan (yellow card) 75'	Stadium: Charentsavan City Stadium

16 March 2022 23	Van	1–1	Pyunik	Charentsavan
14:00 (UTC+4)	A.Petrosyan (penalty missed) 57'; J.Gaba 69' (yellow card) 77'	Report	Zambrano (yellow card) 16'; Déblé (yellow card) 31' (yellow-red card) 58'; Firmino 90+4'	Stadium: Charentsavan City Stadium; Referee: Shahen Aghayan

20 March 2022 24	Van	2–1	Ararat-Armenia	Charentsavan
14:00 (UTC+4)	V.Filippov 71'; Badoyan 75'; N.Hovhannisyan (yellow card) 85'	Report	J.Duarte 17'	Stadium: Charentsavan City Stadium; Referee: Artem Gasparyan

7 April 2022 25	Noah	0–0	Van	Armavir
15:00 (UTC+4)	Harutyunyan (yellow card) 13'; S.Shahinyan (yellow card) 28'; C.Ikechukwu (yellow card) 44'; Gabarayev (yellow card) 52'; Kartashyan (yellow card) 74'; O.Ebenezer (yellow card) 79'	Report	N.Hovhannisyan (yellow card) 15'; E.Avagyan (yellow card) 19'; E.Mireku (yellow card) 37'; Stepanov (yellow card) 90+2'	Stadium: Armavir City Stadium; Referee: Vardan Manukyan

12 April 2022 26	Noravank	7–1	Van	Yerevan
14:00 (UTC+4)	Ibrahim 2', 44'; A.Khachatryan 7'; Yenne 25', 90+2'; A.Avagyan (yellow card) 32'; Orlov 77', 80' (yellow card) 80'; K.Nalbandyan (yellow card) 83'	Report	B.Techie (yellow card) 33'; S.Gutiérrez (yellow card) 45+2'; E.Azizyan (yellow card) 47'; Clifford 66'; Adams (yellow card) 69'	Stadium: FFA Academy Stadium

16 April 2022 27	Van	0–3	Urartu	Charentsavan
15:00 (UTC+4)	Gvazava (yellow card) 44'; B.Hovhannisyan (yellow card) 71' (yellow-red card) 87'; J.Gaba (yellow card) 75'; V.Filippov (yellow card) 80'	Report	N.Aghasaryan (yellow card) 39' (goal) 81'; Miranyan 49', 52'; A.Ghazaryan (yellow card) 78'	Stadium: Charentsavan City Stadium; Referee: Sargis Khachatryan

19 April 2022 28	Van	BYE	Sevan	Charentsavan
(UTC+4)				Stadium: Charentsavan City Stadium
Note: Sevan expelled from the league on 1 December 2021.

23 April 2022 29	Ararat Yerevan	1–1	Van	Yerevan
19:00 (UTC+4)	R.Mkrtchyan (yellow card) 65'; Díaz (yellow card) 71'; J.Bravo 73'	Report	E.Mireku (yellow card) 68'; Clifford 78'	Stadium: Republican Stadium; Referee: Artem Gasparyan

28 April 2022 30	Van	0–1	Alashkert	Charentsavan
15:00 (UTC+4)	E.Mireku (yellow card) 26'; J.Gaba (yellow card) 55'	Report	Fofana 10'; Khurtsidze (yellow card) 45+2'; Vitinho (yellow card) 71'; A.Potapov (yellow card) 88'	Stadium: Charentsavan City Stadium; Referee: Shahen Aghayan

5 May 2022 31	BKMA Yerevan	1–1	Van	Yerevan
16:00 (UTC+4)	D.Aghbalyan 30'	Report	A.Petrosyan (yellow card) 80'; E.Mireku (yellow card) 90+3'; S.Mkrtchyan 90+6' (o.g.)	Stadium: FFA Academy Stadium; Referee: Henrik Nalbandyan

9 May 2022 32	Pyunik	2–0	Van	Yerevan
16:00 (UTC+4)	Caraballo 18'; Firmino 41'; Najaryan (yellow card) 77'	Report		Stadium: Republican Stadium; Referee: Vardan Manukyan

14 May 2022 33	Ararat-Armenia	1–0	Van	Yerevan
19:00 (UTC+4)	Bueno (yellow card) 45+1'; Vakulenko 70'	Report		Stadium: FFA Academy Stadium; Referee: Vardan Manukyan

21 May 2022 34	Van	1–0	Noah	Charentsavan
16:45 (UTC+4)	Clifford 33'	Report	Salou (yellow card) 53'	Stadium: Charentsavan City Stadium; Referee: Artem Gasparyan

25 May 2022 35	Van	2–1	Noravank	Charentsavan
14:00 (UTC+4)	K.Kakhabrishvili 19', 30'; Gvazava (yellow card) 58'; Clifford (yellow card) 83'; A.Malkanduev (yellow card) 90+4'	Report	Ibrahim 69'; H.Avagyan (yellow card) 83'; H.Avagyan (yellow card) 90+1'	Stadium: Charentsavan City Stadium; Referee: Davit Mkrtchyan

28 May 2022 36	Urartu	2–0	Van	Yerevan
17:00 (UTC+4)	Miranyan 6' (pen.) (yellow card) 80'; T.Ayunts (yellow card) 13'; G.Lulukyan 90+1'	Report	J.Gaba (yellow card) 18'; Stepanov (yellow card) 52'	Stadium: Urartu Stadium; Referee: Ashot Ghaltakchyan

==== Table ====
Pos	Team	Pld	W	D	L	GF	GA	GD	Pts	Qualification or relegation
1	Pyunik (C)	32	23	6	3	52	25	+27	75	Qualification for the Champions League first qualifying round
2	Ararat-Armenia	32	23	5	4	56	20	+36	74	Qualification for the Europa Conference League second qualifying round (Note: The 2021–22 Armenian Cup winners, Noravank, did not obtain an UEFA license and was replaced.)
3	Alashkert	32	14	9	9	38	30	+8	51	Qualification for the Europa Conference League first qualifying round
4	Ararat Yerevan	32	13	7	12	47	36	+11	46	Qualification for the Europa Conference League first qualifying round
5	Urartu	32	9	13	10	37	32	+5	40	
6	Noah	32	9	12	11	38	43	−5	39	
7	Noravank	32	7	7	18	36	55	−19	28	
8	Van	32	6	7	19	19	47	−28	25	
9	BKMA (O)	32	4	6	22	25	60	−35	18	Qualification to the relegation play-offs
10	Sevan (D, R)	0	0	0	0	0	0	0	0	Relegation to the Armenian First League (Note: Sevan was expelled from the league on 1 December 2021.)

Source: FFA Soccerway
Rules for classification: 1) Points; 2) Head-to-head points; 3) Head-to-head goal difference; 4) Head-to-head goals scored; 5) Matches won; 6) Goal difference; 7) Less red cards; 8) Less yellow cards; 9) Fair-play ranking 10) Draw
(C) Champions; (D) Disqualified; (O) Play-off winners; (R) Relegated

=== Armenian Cup ===
17 September 2021 First Round	Van	2–2 (a.e.t.) (3–1 p)	Sevan	Charentsavan
15:30 (UTC+4)	Batyrkanov 44', 72'; D.Kuzkin (yellow card) 57'; A.Petrosyan (yellow card) 87'	Report	B.Cham 24'; Claudir 90' (pen.); A.Avagyan (yellow card) 117'; Kartashyan (yellow card) 119'	Stadium: Charentsavan City Stadium; Attendance: 400; Referee: Henrik Nalbandyan
	Penalties
	A.Petrosyan (penalty scored); Voskanyan (penalty missed); V.Ayvazyan (penalty scored); Bruno (penalty scored)		(penalty missed) A.Mensalão; (penalty scored) Duranski; (penalty missed) Kartashyan; (penalty missed) Bissainthe

23 November 2021 Quarterfinal	Pyunik	1–1 (a.e.t.) (2–4 p)	Van	Yerevan
18:00 (UTC+4)	Gareginyan (yellow card) 14'; Carlitos (yellow card) 99'; Stepanov 101' (o.g.)	Report	Stepanov (yellow card) 36' (goal) 117'; S.Adjouman (yellow card) 49'; A.Petrosyan (yellow card) 80'	Stadium: Republican Stadium; Attendance: 300; Referee: Zaven Hovhannisyan
	Penalties
	Harutyunyan (penalty scored); Caraballo (penalty missed); J.Balza (penalty missed); Bruno.N (penalty scored)		Bruno.M (penalty scored); A.Jindoyan (penalty scored); E.Azizyan (penalty scored); Batyrkanov (penalty scored)

3 April 2022 Semifinal	Urartu	3–0	Van	Yerevan
18:00 (UTC+4)	H.Hakobyan (yellow card) 42'; Miranyan 52'; A.Ghazaryan (yellow card) 58'; U.Iwu 64'; Désiré 69' (pen.)	Report	E.Mireku (yellow card) 3'; Stepanov (yellow card) 3'; A.Petrosyan (yellow card) 68'; B.Techie (yellow card) 76'	Stadium: Urartu Stadium; Referee: Shahen Aghayan

== Statistics ==
As of match played 28 May 2022

=== Appearances and goals ===
No.	Pos	Nat	Player	Total		Premier League		Armenian Cup	
No.	Pos	Nat	Player	Apps	Goals	Apps	Goals	Apps	Goals
2	DF	(Armenia) ARM	Vaspurak Minasyan	15	0	13+1	0	1	0
3	DF	(Ecuador) ECU	Silvio Gutierrez	11	0	11	0	0	0
5	DF	(Russia) RUS	Layonel Adams	4	0	3+1	0	0	0
6	DF	(Armenia) ARM	Argishti Petrosyan	33	0	28+2	0	3	0
7	MF	(Russia) RUS	Vladimir Filippov	29	3	19+8	3	2	0
8	MF	(Georgia (country)) GEO	Shota Gvazava	18	0	17	0	1	0
9	MF	(Georgia (country)) GEO	Kakha Kakhabrishvili	14	2	7+6	2	0+1	0
10	MF	(Armenia) ARM	Benik Hovhannisyan	11	0	9+2	0	0	0
11	MF	(Ivory Coast) CIV	Ipehe Williams	17	0	11+5	0	1	0
12	GK	(Armenia) ARM	Arman Meliksetyan	18	0	15+1	0	2	0
13	MF	(Ghana) GHA	Emmanuel Mireku	27	1	19+5	1	3	0
18	MF	(Armenia) ARM	Narek Hovhannisyan	12	0	2+10	0	0	0
19	DF	(Russia) RUS	Aleksandr Stepanov	33	1	31	0	2	1
21	GK	(Armenia) ARM	David Papikyan	5	0	4+1	0	0	0
22	GK	(Italy) ITA	Domenico Coppola	10	0	8+1	0	1	0
23	DF	(Russia) RUS	Dmitri Kuzkin	26	0	22+1	0	3	0
27	DF	(Ivory Coast) CIV	Josue Gaba	25	3	16+7	3	1+1	0
28	DF	(Armenia) ARM	Alexander Hovhannisyan	17	0	14+1	0	2	0
29	MF	(Armenia) ARM	Michael Galstyan	1	0	0+1	0	0	0
35	FW	(South Africa) RSA	Jaisen Clifford	16	3	7+8	3	0+1	0
44	MF	(Saudi Arabia) KSA	Jaber Issa	1	0	0+1	0	0	0
70	MF	(Georgia (country)) GEO	Tengiz Tsikaridze	3	0	1+2	0	0	0
77	MF	(Armenia) ARM	Erik Azizyan	15	1	1+13	1	0+1	0
88	MF	(Armenia) ARM	Zaven Badoyan	14	4	10+2	4	1+1	0
90	MF	(Russia) RUS	Alikhan Malkanduev	9	0	4+5	0	0	0
96	MF	(Armenia) ARM	Edvard Avagyan	9	0	3+5	0	0+1	0
99	FW	(Ghana) GHA	Benjamin Techie	8	0	1+6	0	0+1	0
Players away on loan:
Players who left Van during the season:
2	DF	(Ivory Coast) CIV	Emile N'dri Koukou	2	0	1	0	0+1	0
3	DF	(Armenia) ARM	Andranik Voskanyan	15	0	10+3	0	2	0
5	MF	(Brazil) BRA	Bruno Miguel	8	0	5+1	0	1+1	0
8	DF	(Armenia) ARM	Gagik Daghbashyan	10	0	4+4	0	0+2	0
9	FW	(Armenia) ARM	Akhmed Jindoyan	11	0	2+7	0	0+2	0
10	MF	(Nigeria) NGR	Ededem Essien	12	0	9+2	0	1	0
11	FW	(Kyrgyzstan) KGZ	Ernist Batyrkanov	10	2	5+3	0	1+1	2
16	MF	(Brazil) BRA	Luis Menezes	14	1	11+2	1	1	0
17	MF	(Ivory Coast) CIV	Stéphane Adjouman	16	0	8+6	0	2	0
18	DF	(Armenia) ARM	Vahagn Ayvazyan	17	0	15	0	2	0
22	GK	(Ukraine) UKR	Mykola Tsyhan	8	0	5+2	0	0+1	0
44	MF	(Russia) RUS	Norik Mkrtchyan	3	0	0+3	0	0	0
99	FW	(Nigeria) NGR	Pascal Chidi	8	0	2+5	0	0+1	0

=== Goal scorers ===
Place	Position	Nation	Number	Name	Premier League	Armenian Cup	Total
1	MF	(Armenia)	88	Zaven Badoyan	4	0	4
2	DF	(Ivory Coast)	27	Josue Gaba	3	0	3
2	MF	(Russia)	7	Vladimir Filippov	3	0	3
2	FW	(South Africa)	35	Jaisen Clifford	3	0	3
5	MF	(Georgia (country))	9	Kakha Kakhabrishvili	2	0	2
5	FW	(Kyrgyzstan)	11	Ernist Batyrkanov	0	2	2
7	MF	(Ghana)	13	Emmanuel Mireku	1	0	1
7	MF	(Brazil)	16	Luis Menezes	1	0	1
7	MF	(Armenia)	77	Erik Azizyan	1	0	1
7	DF	(Russia)	19	Aleksandr Stepanov	0	1	1
7				Own goal	1	0	1
				TOTALS	19	3	22

=== Clean sheets ===
Place	Position	Nation	Number	Name	Premier League	Armenian Cup	Total
1	GK	(Armenia)	12	Arman Meliksetyan	3	0	3
2	GK	(Italy)	22	Domenico Coppola	2	0	2
				TOTALS	5	0	5

=== Disciplinary record ===
Number	Nation	Position	Name	Premier League		Armenian Cup		Total	
Number	Nation	Position	Name	Yellow card	Red card	Yellow card	Red card	Yellow card	Red card
3	(Ecuador)	DF	Silvio Gutierrez	1	0	0	0	1	0
5	(Russia)	DF	Layonel Adams	1	0	0	0	1	0
6	(Armenia)	DF	Argishti Petrosyan	4	0	3	0	7	0
7	(Russia)	MF	Vladimir Filippov	1	0	0	0	1	0
8	(Georgia (country))	MF	Shota Gvazava	2	0	0	0	2	0
10	(Armenia)	MF	Benik Hovhannisyan	2	1	0	0	2	1
12	(Armenia)	GK	Arman Meliksetyan	1	0	0	0	1	0
13	(Ghana)	MF	Emmanuel Mireku	7	2	1	0	8	2
18	(Armenia)	MF	Narek Hovhannisyan	2	0	0	0	2	0
19	(Russia)	DF	Aleksandr Stepanov	7	0	2	0	9	0
23	(Russia)	DF	Dmitri Kuzkin	2	0	1	0	3	0
27	(Ivory Coast)	DF	Josue Gaba	7	0	0	0	7	0
28	(Armenia)	DF	Alexander Hovhannisyan	0	1	0	0	0	1
35	(South Africa)	FW	Jaisen Clifford	1	0	0	0	1	0
77	(Armenia)	MF	Erik Azizyan	1	0	0	0	1	0
88	(Armenia)	MF	Zaven Badoyan	1	0	0	0	1	0
90	(Russia)	MF	Alikhan Malkanduev	1	0	0	0	1	0
96	(Armenia)	DF	Edvard Avagyan	1	0	0	0	1	0
99	(Ghana)	FW	Benjamin Techie	1	0	1	0	2	0
Players away on loan:
Players who left Van during the season:
3	(Armenia)	DF	Andranik Voskanyan	1	0	0	0	1	0
8	(Armenia)	DF	Gagik Daghbashyan	2	0	0	0	2	0
10	(Nigeria)	MF	Ededem Essien	3	0	0	0	3	0
11	(Kyrgyzstan)	FW	Ernist Batyrkanov	1	0	0	0	1	0
16	(Brazil)	MF	Luis Menezes	1	0	0	0	1	0
17	(Ivory Coast)	MF	Stéphane Adjouman	1	0	1	0	2	0
18	(Armenia)	DF	Vahagn Ayvazyan	3	0	0	0	3	0
			TOTALS	61	4	9	0	70	4
