= List of Georgian football transfers summer 2022 =

This is a list of Georgian football transfers summer 22.

== Erovnuli Liga ==
=== Dinamo Batumi ===
In: Note: Flags indicate national team as defined under FIFA eligibility rules; some limited exceptions apply. Players may hold more than one non-FIFA nationality.

| No. | Pos. | Nation | Player |
|---|---|---|---|
| — | FW | GEO | Mate Vatsadze (from Gagra) |

Out: Note: Flags indicate national team as defined under FIFA eligibility rules; some limited exceptions apply. Players may hold more than one non-FIFA nationality.

| No. | Pos. | Nation | Player |
|---|---|---|---|
| — | DF | GEO | Khvicha Kvaratskhelia (to (Italy) Napoli) |
| — | MF | GEO | Levan Gegetchkori (to Torpedo Kutaisi) |
| — | FW | GEO | Elguja Lobjanidze (to (Kazakhstan) Kyzylzhar) |

=== Dinamo Tbilisi ===
In: Note: Flags indicate national team as defined under FIFA eligibility rules; some limited exceptions apply. Players may hold more than one non-FIFA nationality.

| No. | Pos. | Nation | Player |

Out: Note: Flags indicate national team as defined under FIFA eligibility rules; some limited exceptions apply. Players may hold more than one non-FIFA nationality.

| No. | Pos. | Nation | Player |
|---|---|---|---|
| — | DF | GEO | Levan Kharabadze (to (Cyprus) Pafos) |
| — | MF | GEO | Giorgi Kimadze (to Torpedo Kutaisi) |

=== Dila Gori ===
In: Note: Flags indicate national team as defined under FIFA eligibility rules; some limited exceptions apply. Players may hold more than one non-FIFA nationality.

| No. | Pos. | Nation | Player |
|---|---|---|---|
| — | GK | UKR | Danylo Kanevtsev (from (Ukraine) Metalist Kharkiv) |
| — | MF | UKR | Yuriy Batyushyn (from (Ukraine) Metalist 1925 Kharkiv) |

Out: Note: Flags indicate national team as defined under FIFA eligibility rules; some limited exceptions apply. Players may hold more than one non-FIFA nationality.

| No. | Pos. | Nation | Player |
|---|---|---|---|
| — | MF | BRA | Vagner Gonçalves (to (North Macedonia) Shkëndija) |
| — | FW | GEO | Giorgi Ivaniadze (from (Kazakhstan) Kyzylzhar) |

=== Gagra ===
In: Note: Flags indicate national team as defined under FIFA eligibility rules; some limited exceptions apply. Players may hold more than one non-FIFA nationality.

| No. | Pos. | Nation | Player |

Out: Note: Flags indicate national team as defined under FIFA eligibility rules; some limited exceptions apply. Players may hold more than one non-FIFA nationality.

| No. | Pos. | Nation | Player |
|---|---|---|---|
| — | DF | GEO | Solomon Kvirkvelia (to (Azerbaijan) Neftçi) |
| — | MF | GEO | Temur Chogadze (to (Kazakhstan) Shakhter Karagandy) |
| — | MF | GEO | Mate Kvirkvia (to (Azerbaijan) Kapaz) |
| — | FW | GEO | Mate Vatsadze (to Dinamo Batumi) |

=== Locomotive Tbilisi ===
In: Note: Flags indicate national team as defined under FIFA eligibility rules; some limited exceptions apply. Players may hold more than one non-FIFA nationality.

| No. | Pos. | Nation | Player |

Out: Note: Flags indicate national team as defined under FIFA eligibility rules; some limited exceptions apply. Players may hold more than one non-FIFA nationality.

| No. | Pos. | Nation | Player |
|---|---|---|---|
| — | MF | GEO | Davit Samurkasovi (to (Greece) Episkopi) |

=== Saburtalo Tbilisi ===
In: Note: Flags indicate national team as defined under FIFA eligibility rules; some limited exceptions apply. Players may hold more than one non-FIFA nationality.

| No. | Pos. | Nation | Player |
|---|---|---|---|
| — | MF | CRO | Benedik Mioč (from (Croatia) Hrvatski Dragovoljac) |

Out: Note: Flags indicate national team as defined under FIFA eligibility rules; some limited exceptions apply. Players may hold more than one non-FIFA nationality.

| No. | Pos. | Nation | Player |
|---|---|---|---|
| 17 | MF | GEO | Luka Tsulukidze (loan return to (Russia) Ural Yekaterinburg) |

=== Samgurali Tsqaltubo ===
In: Note: Flags indicate national team as defined under FIFA eligibility rules; some limited exceptions apply. Players may hold more than one non-FIFA nationality.

| No. | Pos. | Nation | Player |

Out: Note: Flags indicate national team as defined under FIFA eligibility rules; some limited exceptions apply. Players may hold more than one non-FIFA nationality.

| No. | Pos. | Nation | Player |

=== Samtredia ===
In: Note: Flags indicate national team as defined under FIFA eligibility rules; some limited exceptions apply. Players may hold more than one non-FIFA nationality.

| No. | Pos. | Nation | Player |
|---|---|---|---|
| — | MF | GEO | Anzor Tevzadze (loan from Torpedo Kutaisi) |
| — | MF | GEO | Vakhtang Bochorishvili (loan from Torpedo Kutaisi) |

Out: Note: Flags indicate national team as defined under FIFA eligibility rules; some limited exceptions apply. Players may hold more than one non-FIFA nationality.

| No. | Pos. | Nation | Player |

=== Shukura Kobuleti ===
In: Note: Flags indicate national team as defined under FIFA eligibility rules; some limited exceptions apply. Players may hold more than one non-FIFA nationality.

| No. | Pos. | Nation | Player |

Out: Note: Flags indicate national team as defined under FIFA eligibility rules; some limited exceptions apply. Players may hold more than one non-FIFA nationality.

| No. | Pos. | Nation | Player |

=== Sioni Bolnisi ===
In: Note: Flags indicate national team as defined under FIFA eligibility rules; some limited exceptions apply. Players may hold more than one non-FIFA nationality.

| No. | Pos. | Nation | Player |

Out: Note: Flags indicate national team as defined under FIFA eligibility rules; some limited exceptions apply. Players may hold more than one non-FIFA nationality.

| No. | Pos. | Nation | Player |
|---|---|---|---|
| — | DF | GEO | Giorgi Gadrani |
| — | MF | GEO | Luka Koberidze (to (Lithuania) FK Riteriai) |
| — | FW | GEO | Toma Tabatadze (to (Kazakhstan) Akzhayik) |

=== Telavi ===
In: Note: Flags indicate national team as defined under FIFA eligibility rules; some limited exceptions apply. Players may hold more than one non-FIFA nationality.

| No. | Pos. | Nation | Player |
|---|---|---|---|
| 95 | MF | BRA | Vitinho (from (Armenia) Alashkert) |

Out: Note: Flags indicate national team as defined under FIFA eligibility rules; some limited exceptions apply. Players may hold more than one non-FIFA nationality.

| No. | Pos. | Nation | Player |
|---|---|---|---|
| — | MF | GEO | Giorgi Kantaria (to (Azerbaijan) Kapaz) |

=== Torpedo Kutaisi ===
In: Note: Flags indicate national team as defined under FIFA eligibility rules; some limited exceptions apply. Players may hold more than one non-FIFA nationality.

| No. | Pos. | Nation | Player |
|---|---|---|---|
| — | MF | GEO | Beka Vachiberadze (from (Ukraine) Chornomorets Odesa) |
| — | MF | GEO | Merab Gigauri (from (Azerbaijan) Shamakhi) |
| — | MF | GEO | Levan Gegetchkori (from Dinamo Batumi) |
| — | MF | GEO | Giorgi Kimadze (from Dinamo Tbilisi) |
| — | MF | POR | Pedro Monteiro (from (Portugal) Académico Viseu) |
| — | MF | GEO | Giorgi Mchedlishvili (from Samtredia) |
| — | MF | GEO | Nodar Kavtaradze (from Saburtalo Tbilisi) |
| — | FW | PAR | Mauro Caballero (from (Portugal) Académica de Coimbra) |

Out: Note: Flags indicate national team as defined under FIFA eligibility rules; some limited exceptions apply. Players may hold more than one non-FIFA nationality.

| No. | Pos. | Nation | Player |
|---|---|---|---|
| — | DF | GEO | Irakli Dzaria (released) |
| — | DF | GEO | Bakar Mirtskhulava (released) |
| — | MF | GRE | Vasilios Karagounis (to (Greece) Kalamata) |
| — | MF | UKR | Levan Arveladze (released) |
| — | MF | GEO | Beka Vachiberadze (loan return to (Ukraine) Chornomorets) |
| — | MF | GEO | Anzor Tevzadze (loan to Samtredia) |
| — | MF | GEO | Vakhtang Bochorishvili (loan to Samtredia) |

== Erovnuli Liga 2 ==
=== Shevardeni-1906 ===
In: Note: Flags indicate national team as defined under FIFA eligibility rules; some limited exceptions apply. Players may hold more than one non-FIFA nationality.

| No. | Pos. | Nation | Player |

Out: Note: Flags indicate national team as defined under FIFA eligibility rules; some limited exceptions apply. Players may hold more than one non-FIFA nationality.

| No. | Pos. | Nation | Player |
|---|---|---|---|
| — | DF | UKR | Andriy Mostovyi (loan return to (Ukraine) Kryvbas Kryvyi Rih) |
| — | DF | UKR | Badri Akubardia (released) |
| — | DF | UKR | Dmytro Zozulya (released) |
| — | MF | UKR | Stanislav Sorokin (loan return to (Ukraine) Kolos Kovalivka) |
| — | MF | UKR | Yevheniy Lozovyi (released) |
| — | MF | UKR | Andriy Slinkin (to (Lithuania) Jonava) |
| — | MF | UKR | Oleksandr Vechtomov (to (Germany) Grün-Weiß Lübben) |
| — | FW | UKR | Ihor Kiriyenko (released) |
