= 2019 Georgian Super Cup =

Saburtalo Tbilisi	Torpedo Kutaisi
0	1
- Date: 24 February 2019
- Venue: Tengiz Burjanadze Stadium, Gori
- Referee: Giorgi Kruashvili

2019 Georgian Super Cup was a Georgian football match that was played on 24 February 2019 between the champions of the 2018 Erovnuli Liga, FC Saburtalo Tbilisi, and the winner of the 2018 Georgian Cup, FC Torpedo Kutaisi.

== Match details ==
24 February 2019
16:00 UTC+04:00

Saburtalo Tbilisi	0–1	Torpedo Kutaisi
	Report	Gigauri 70'

Tengiz Burjanadze Stadium, Gori
Referee: Giorgi Kruashvili

Saburtalo Tbilisi	Torpedo Kutaisi

GK	1	(Georgia (country)) Omar Migineishvili
DF	4	(Georgia (country)) Gagi Margvelashvili
DF	13	(Georgia (country)) Grigol Chabradze
DF	16	(Georgia (country)) Luka Lakvekheliani
MF	20	(Kenya) Alwyn Tera	(yellow card) 34'	(substituted off) 72'
MF	39	(Georgia (country)) Tornike Gorgiashvili	(yellow card) 73'
MF	80	(Georgia (country)) Gega Diasamidze		(substituted off) 75'
MF	21	(Georgia (country)) Levan Kakubava
FW	10	(Georgia (country)) Giorgi Kokhreidze	(yellow card) 43'
FW	42	(Brazil) Vagner Gonçalves
FW	23	(Ivory Coast) Inters Gui		(substituted off) 59'
Substitutes:
GK	16	(Ukraine) Denys Shelikhov
DF	3	(Georgia (country)) Nikoloz Mali
FW	8	(Georgia (country)) Guram Goshteliani		(substituted on) 75'
FW	14	(Georgia (country)) Vladimir Dvalishvili
MF	21	(Georgia (country)) Beka Gvaradze		(substituted on) 59'
MF	22	(Georgia (country)) Sandro Altunashvili		(substituted on) 72'
DF	15	(Georgia (country)) Dachi Tsnobiladze
Manager:
(Georgia (country)) Giorgi Tchiabrishvili

GK	89	(Georgia (country)) Roin Kvaskhvadze
DF	18	(Georgia (country)) Levan Gegetchkori	(yellow card) 80'
DF	23	(Georgia (country)) Giorgi Kimadze	(yellow card) 55'
DF	30	(Georgia (country)) Mamuka Kobakhidze
DF		(Montenegro) Nikola Stijepović
DF		(Ukraine) Oleksandr Azatskyi
MF	6	(Georgia (country)) Mate Tsintsadze		(substituted off) 79'
MF	22	(Georgia (country)) Grigol Dolidze		(substituted off) 65'
MF	77	(Georgia (country)) Merab Gigauri	70'
MF		(Russia) Nodar Kavtaradze
FW		(Georgia (country)) Budu Zivzivadze		(substituted off) 87'
Substitutes:
GK	25	(Georgia (country)) Maksime Kvilitaia
DF	5	(Georgia (country)) Davit Khurtsilava
DF		(Georgia (country)) Anri Tchitchinadze
DF		(Ukraine) Ambrosiy Chachua		(substituted on) 65'
MF	20	(Georgia (country)) Tengiz Tsikaridze		(substituted on) 79'
FW	9	(Georgia (country)) Tornike Kapanadze		(substituted on) 87'
FW	13	(Brazil) Richard Luca
Manager:
(Georgia (country)) Kakhaber Chkhetiani

== See also ==
- 2019 Erovnuli Liga
- 2019 Georgian Cup
