= Dzalamidze =

Dzalamidze (Georgian: ძალამიძე) is a Georgian surname. Notable people with the surname include:

- Natela Dzalamidze (born 1993), Russian-Georgian tennis player.
- Nika Dzalamidze (born 1992), Georgian footballer
