= 2018 Georgian Super Cup =

Torpedo Kutaisi	Chikhura Sachkhere
2	1
- Date: 24 February 2018
- Venue: David Petriashvili Stadium, Tbilisi
- Referee: Giorgi Vadatchkoria

2018 Georgian Super Cup was a Georgian football match that was played on 24 February 2018 between the champions of 2017 Erovnuli Liga, Torpedo Kutaisi, and the winner of the 2017 Georgian Cup, Chikhura Sachkhere.

== Match details ==
24 February 2018
15:00 UTC+04:00

Torpedo Kutaisi	2–1	Chikhura Sachkhere
Kukhianidze 86'; Kutalia 90+1'	Report	Bughridze 76'

David Petriashvili Stadium, Tbilisi
Attendance: 1,200
Referee: Giorgi Vadatchkoria

Torpedo Kutaisi	Chikhura Sachkhere

GK	89	(Georgia (country)) Roin Kvaskhvadze
DF	2	(Georgia (country)) Tabatadze
DF	17	(Georgia (country)) Giorgi Guruli
DF	23	(Georgia (country)) Giorgi Kimadze
DF		(Georgia (country)) David Khurtsilava
MF	10	(Georgia (country)) Giorgi Kukhianidze
MF	19	(Georgia (country)) Levan Kutalia	(yellow card) 90+1'
MF	22	(Georgia (country)) Grigol Dolidze		(substituted off) 78'
MF	77	(Georgia (country)) Merab Gigauri
MF		(Georgia (country)) Beka Tughushi		(substituted off) 59'
FW	9	(Georgia (country)) Tornike Kapanadze	(yellow card) 40'	(substituted off) 64'
Substitutes:
GK	1	(Georgia (country)) Maksime Kvilitaia
MF	6	(Georgia (country)) Oleg Mamasakhlisi
FW	7	(Georgia (country)) Mikheil Sardalishvili		(substituted on) 78'
FW	37	(Ukraine) Yevhen Bokhashvili		(substituted on) 64'
DF	39	(Georgia (country)) Tornike Grigalashvili
DF		(Georgia (country)) Anri Tchitchinadze
MF		(Georgia (country)) Tengiz Tsikaridze		(substituted on) 59'
Manager:
(Georgia (country)) Kakhaber Chkhetiani

GK	30	(Bosnia and Herzegovina) Dino Hamzić
DF	19	(Georgia (country)) Levan Kakubava
DF	24	(Georgia (country)) Lasha Chikvaidze	(yellow card) 81'
DF	37	(Georgia (country)) Shota Kashia
DF		(Georgia (country)) Davit Maisashvili
DF		(Georgia (country)) Bakar Mirtskhulava
MF	22	(Georgia (country)) Irakli Lekvtadze		(substituted off) 64'
MF	27	(Georgia (country)) Denis Dobrovolski
MF		(Georgia (country)) Teimuraz Markozashvili	(yellow card) 15'
FW	9	(Georgia (country)) Giorgi Gabedava		(substituted off) 43'
FW		(Georgia (country)) Davit Ionanidze		(substituted off) 70'
Substitutes:
GK	13	(Georgia (country)) Zurab Mtskerashvili
DF		(Georgia (country)) Revaz Chiteishvili
DF		(Georgia (country)) Davit Megrelishvili
MF		(Georgia (country)) Demur Chikhladze
MF		(Brazil) Guga		(substituted on) 43'
MF		(Georgia (country)) Irakli Bughridze		(substituted on) 64'
FW		(Georgia (country)) Kakha Kakhabrishvili		(substituted on) 70'
Manager:
(Georgia (country)) Samson Pruidze

== See also ==
- 2018 Erovnuli Liga
- 2018 Georgian Cup
