= 2015 Georgian Super Cup =

Dila Gori	Dinamo Tbilisi
0	1
- Date: 25 August 2015
- Venue: Mikheil Meskhi Stadium, Tbilisi
- Referee: Giorgi Vadatchkoria

2015 Georgian Super Cup was a Georgian football match that was played on 25 August 2015 between the champions of 2014–15 Umaglesi Liga, Dila Gori, and the winner of the 2014–15 Georgian Cup, Dinamo Tbilisi.

== Match details ==
25 August 2015
20:00 UTC+04:00

Dila Gori	0–1	Dinamo Tbilisi
	Report	Chanturishvili 76'

Mikheil Meskhi Stadium, Tbilisi
Attendance: 2,000
Referee: Giorgi Vadatchkoria

Dila Gori	Dinamo Tbilisi

GK	12	(Ukraine) Oleksiy Shevchenko
DF	2	(Georgia (country)) David Khurtsilava
DF	27	(Georgia (country)) Givi Karkuzashvili	(yellow card) 81'
DF	49	(Georgia (country)) Aleksandr Kvakhadze
DF	88	(Georgia (country)) Giorgi Navalovski	(yellow card) 38'
MF	3	(Georgia (country)) Giorgi Papava
MF	5	(Georgia (country)) Guga Palavandishvili
MF	20	(Georgia (country)) Irakli Dzaria	(yellow card) 48'	(substituted on) 82'
MF	77	(Georgia (country)) Lasha Gvalia	(yellow card) 30'	(substituted on) 57'
FW	14	(Russia) Islam Mashukov		(substituted on) 73'
FW	99	(Georgia (country)) Otar Martsvaladze
Substitutes:
GK	30	(Georgia (country)) Mikheil Mujrishvili
FW	15	(Georgia (country)) Irakli Modebadze		(substituted on) 73'
DF	21	(Georgia (country)) Teimuraz Gongadze
DF	22	(Georgia (country)) Ilia Lomidze
MF	35	(Georgia (country)) Roman Akhalkatsi		(substituted on) 82'
DF	90	(Georgia (country)) Mate Kvirkvia		(substituted on) 57'
MF		(Georgia (country)) Levan Nonikashvili
Manager:
(Georgia (country)) Ucha Sosiashvili

GK	21	(Georgia (country)) Giorgi Begashvili
DF	2	(Georgia (country)) Otar Kakabadze
DF	25	(Brazil) René Santos	(yellow card) 38'
DF	30	(Georgia (country)) Giorgi Gvelesiani
MF	6	(Georgia (country)) Mate Tsintsadze	(yellow card) 90+4'
MF	9	(Georgia (country)) Aleksandre Iashvili		(substituted off) 90+1'
MF	14	(Georgia (country)) Lasha Parunashvili	(yellow card) 49'
MF	31	(Georgia (country)) Jaba Jighauri	(yellow card) 90+2'
MF	77	(Georgia (country)) Vakhtang Chanturishvili	(yellow card) 44'
MF		(Georgia (country)) Giorgi Tevzadze		(substituted off) 89'
FW	11	(Georgia (country)) Giorgi Kvilitaia		(substituted off) 80'
Substitutes:
GK	1	(Georgia (country)) Giorgi Kulua
DF	5	(Georgia (country)) Archil Tvildiani
MF	7	(Georgia (country)) Giorgi Janelidze
FW	8	(Georgia (country)) Bachana Arabuli		(substituted on) 90+1'
MF	13	(Georgia (country)) Otar Kiteishvili		(substituted on) 80'
DF	17	(Georgia (country)) Giorgi Guruli		(substituted on) 89'
DF	37	(Georgia (country)) Zaza Chelidze
Manager:
(Georgia (country)) Gia Geguchadze

== See also ==
- 2015–16 Umaglesi Liga
- 2015–16 Georgian Cup
