= Kakhaber Chkhetiani =

Georgian footballer and manager

Personal information
- Date of birth: 24 February 1978 (age 48)
- Place of birth: Kutaisi, Georgian SSR
- Height: 1.70 m (5 ft 7 in)
- Position: Midfielder

Team information
- Current team: Meshakhte (head coach)

Senior career*
Years	Team	Apps	(Gls)
1995–2001	Torpedo Kutaisi	116	(7)
2001–2003	Debreceni VSC	45	(4)
2003	Pécsi Mecsek FC	7	(0)
2004	Tavriya Simferopol	20	(0)
2005–2007	Zestaponi	78	(1)
2008–2010	Simurq	65	(3)
2010–2011	Baia Zugdidi	6	(0)
Total		337	(15)

International career
1998–1999	Georgia U21	9	(0)
1998	Georgia	1	(0)

Managerial career
- 2011–2013: Torpedo Kutaisi (Assistant)
- 2013–2014: Merani Martvili
- 2014: Zestaponi (Assistant)
- 2015: Dinamo Tbilisi (Assistant)
- 2016–2019: Torpedo Kutaisi
- 2019–2020: Dinamo Tbilisi
- 2021: Torpedo Kutaisi
- 2022–2023: Torpedo Kutaisi
- 2024–2025: Kolkheti 1913
- 2026–: Meshakhte
- * Club domestic league appearances and goals

Kakhaber Chkhetiani (Georgian: კახა ჩხეტიანი; born 24 February 1978) is a Georgian former professional football player and manager. Currently he is the head coach of Erovnuli Liga club Meshakhte.

As a player, Chkhetiani has won the national league and cup competitions trophies with Torpedo Kutaisi. Later he guided the latter to all three domestic trophies as their manager.

His brother Zviad Chkhetiani was also a professional footballer.

== Career ==
Каkha Chkhetiani started his managerial career at Torpedo Kutaisi where he had taken first steps as a professional player. Initially, he worked as assistant head coach under Gia Geguchadze. In 2013, Chkhetiani took charge of Merani Martvili.

In 2016, he returned to Torpedo Kutaisi. Over the next three years the team under his guidance won five titles in all three domestic competitions, including the Erovnuli Liga. Chkhetiani continued his duties through a turbulent 2019 season when the club experienced major financial troubles. But at the end of this year, he left Torpedo and moved to Dinamo Tbilisi.

Chkhetiani stepped down in August 2020 the day after an early Champions league exit citing a heavy backlash from fans.

The next year his tenure at Torpedo lasted less than five months. In its statement the club pointed out that his departure resulted from unsatisfactory results produced by the team. However, there were suggestions that political motives might have been behind this decision as Chkhetiani had been running for the municipal council of Kutaisi as a candidate for one of the opposition parties in local elections. Later the manager insisted that he had no political ambitions whatsoever.

In May 2022 Chkhetiani began his third spell at Torpedo. His return marked another Cup trophy later the same year.

On 11 May 2024, Chkhetiani was appointed as the head coach of Kolkheti 1913 where he stayed for the next 15 months.

On 18 July 2026, Chkhetiani was unveiled as manager of relegation-threatened Erovnuli Liga side Meshakhte.

== Honours ==
=== Player ===
Torpedo Kutaisi

- Erovnuli Liga (2): 1999–00, 2000–01
- Georgian Cup (2): 1998–99, 2000–01

=== Manager ===
Torpedo Kutaisi

- Erovnuli Liga (1): 2017
- Georgian Cup (3): 2016, 2018, 2022
- Georgian Super Cup (2): 2018, 2019
