= Pascal Chidi =

Nigerian footballer

Personal information
- Full name: Pascal Chidi Bolu
- Date of birth: 23 November 2000 (age 25)
- Place of birth: Nigeria
- Height: 1.92 m (6 ft 4 in)
- Position: Forward

Team information
- Current team: Dukagjini
- Number: 91

Youth career
- –2020: Right2Win Sports Academy

Senior career*
Years	Team	Apps	(Gls)
2020	Zimbru Chișinău	5	(0)
2020–2021	Khor Fakkan	0	(0)
2021	→ Dibba Al-Hisn (loan)	-	(-)
2021–2022	Van	8	(0)
2022–2023	Dante Botoșani	2	(0)
2023	Arsenal Tivat	0	(0)
2024–	Dukagjini	2	(0)
- * Club domestic league appearances and goals as of 15 June 2024

Pascal Chidi Bolu (born 23 November 2000), is a Nigerian footballer who plays as a forward for Dukagjini in Kosovo.

== Career ==
On 17 September 2021, Chidi signed for FC Van. On 11 February 2022, Chidi left Van by mutual agreement.

== Career statistics ==
=== Club ===
As of match played 19 November 2021.

Club	Season	League			Cup		Continental		Other		Total	
Club	Season	Division	Apps	Goals	Apps	Goals	Apps	Goals	Apps	Goals	Apps	Goals
Zimbru Chișinău	2020-21	Divizia Națională	5	0	0	0	0	0	0	0	5	0
Khor Fakkan	2020–21	UAE Pro League	0	0	0	0	0	0	0	0	0	0
Dibba Al-Hisn (loan)	2020–21	UAE First Division	0	0	0	0	0	0	0	0	0	0
Van	2021–22	Armenian Premier League	8	0	1	0	-				9	0
Career total			13	0	1	0	0	0	0	0	14	0
