= Badri Akubardia =

Ukrainian footballer

Badri Akubardiya
Personal information
- Full name: Badri Raboyevych Akubardiya
- Date of birth: 11 January 1993 (age 33)
- Place of birth: Pichori, Gali Municipality, Georgia
- Height: 1.82 m (5 ft 11 1/2 in)
- Position: Defender

Youth career
- –2006: Youth Sport School Brovary
- 2006–2009: RVUFK Kyiv
- 2010: Dynamo Kyiv

Senior career*
Years	Team	Apps	(Gls)
2010–2016	Dynamo Kyiv	0	(0)
2013–2016	→ Dynamo-2 Kyiv	46	(3)
2016	Zugdidi	6	(0)
2017	Helios Kharkiv	7	(0)
2017–2018	Sumy	13	(1)
2018–2019	Gomel	34	(3)
2020	Rustavi	7	(0)
2021	Polissya Zhytomyr	11	(0)
2022	Shevardeni-1906 Tbilisi	4	(0)
2022	Concordia Elbląg	12	(0)

International career^{‡}
2010–2011	Ukraine U18	5	(0)
2011–2012	Ukraine U19	9	(0)
2012–2013	Ukraine U21	6	(0)
- * Club domestic league appearances and goals as of 13 November 2022 ‡ National team caps and goals as of 30 November 2021

Badri Akubardiya (Ukrainian: Бадрі Рабоєвич Акубардія; Georgian: ბადრი აქუბარდია; born 11 January 1993) is a former professional footballer who played as a defender. Born in Georgia, he represented Ukraine internationally.

== Career ==
Akubardiya is a product of the Youth Sport School Brovary, RVUFK Kyiv and FC Dynamo youth sportive schools and signed a 3.5-year contract with FC Dynamo in the Ukrainian Premier League in December 2012.
