= Mamia Gavashelishvili =

Georgian association football player

Personal information
- Date of birth: 8 January 1995 (age 31)
- Place of birth: Oni, Racha, Georgia
- Height: 1.80 m (5 ft 11 in)
- Position: Forward

Team information
- Current team: Rustavi
- Number: 9

Youth career
- Torpedo Kutaisi

Senior career*
Years	Team	Apps	(Gls)
2012–2013	Torpedo	4	(2)
2014–2021	Locomotive	171	(90)
2022	Samgurali	24	(1)
2023	Kolkheti 1913	31	(12)
2024	Locomotive	25	(11)
2025–	Rustavi	0	(0)
- * Club domestic league appearances and goals as of 5 April 2025

Mamia Gavashelishvili (Georgian: მამია გავაშელიშვილი, born on 8 January 1995) is a Georgian footballer who plays as an attacker for Erovnuli Liga 2 club Rustavi.

Gavashelishvili is the winner of the Erovnuli Liga 2 with Kolkheti 1913. Individually, he was the topscorer of the 2014–15 Pirveli Liga season.

== Career ==
Born in a mountainous town of Oni, Gavashelishvili started playing football at a local school before attracting interest from Torpedo Kutaisi scouts. Being initially a member of the reserve team, he made his debut for the senior team as a substitute in a 4–1 win over Zugdidi on 18 May 2012, in which he scored the third goal.

In 2014, Gavashelishvili moved to Locomotive where he remained for nine successive seasons. The 2014–15 season turned out special as the team advanced into the top flight while Gavashelishvili broke the league record for goals in a season. His tally of 45 goals (55.7% of Locomotive's all goals) in 37 matches has since remained unreachable.

For two consecutive seasons, in 2017 and 2018, Gavashelishvili ended up as the team's topscorer. Early next year, though, while on a pre-season training session, he was diagnosed with cancer which saw him out of action during the entire season.

On 18 September 2020, as Locomotive prevailed over Dynamo Moscow in a UEFA Europa League qualifying match, Gavashelishvili came on the pitch to increase his team's lead.

In late December 2021, Gavashelishvili signed a season-long contract with Samgurali. A year later he joined Kolkheti 1913 and contributed to their promotion to the top tier with 12 league goals.

Gavashelishvili returned to Locomotive in 2024 and showed his goal-scoring abilities again. His 11 goals, being the best individual result, helped Locomotive with a fourth-place finish in the 2nd division. However, Gavashelishvili was among ten players and the entire staff who left the club in December 2024. A few weeks later, he moved to Rustavi along with his two teammates.

== Statistics ==
As of match played 8 December 2024

Appearances and goals by club, season and competition
Club	Season	League			National cup		Continental		Other		Total	
Club	Season	Division	Apps	Goals	Apps	Goals	Apps	Goals	Apps	Goals	Apps	Goals
Torpedo	2012–13	Umaglesi Liga	1	1	–		–		–		1	1
Torpedo	2013–14	Umaglesi Liga	3	1	–		–		–		3	1
Torpedo	Total		4	2	0	0	0	0	0	0	4	2
Locomotive	2013–14	Pirveli Liga	12	7	–		–		–		12	7
Locomotive	2014–15	Pirveli Liga	37	45	2	0	–		1 (Note: Appearance in Erovnuli Liga playoffs)	1	40	46
Locomotive	2015–16	Umaglesi Liga	25	5	2	0	–		–		27	5
Locomotive	2016	Umaglesi Liga	3	0	1	0	–		–		4	0
Locomotive	2017	Erovnuli Liga	15	10	1	0	–		–		16	10
Locomotive	2018	Erovnuli Liga	29	11	1	1	–		–		30	12
Locomotive	2019	Erovnuli Liga	–		–		–		–		0	0
Locomotive	2020	Erovnuli Liga	15	5	1	0	2 (Note: Appearances in UEFA Europa League)	1	–		18	6
Locomotive	2021	Erovnuli Liga	35	7	3	1	–		–		38	8
Samgurali	2022	Erovnuli Liga	24	1	1	0	–		–		25	1
Kolkheti 1913	2023	Erovnuli Liga 2	31	12	3	4	–		–		34	16
Locomotive	2024	Erovnuli Liga 2	25	11	2	1	–		–		27	12
Locomotive	Total		196	101	13	3	2	1	1	1	212	106
Rustavi	2025	Erovnuli Liga 2	0	0	0	0	–		–		0	0
Career total			255	116	17	7	2	1	1	1	275	125

== Honours ==
=== Team ===
- Georgian Cup: 2020

=== Individual ===
- Pirveli Liga topscorer: 2014–15
