= Giorgi Kimadze =

Georgian footballer

Personal information
- Full name: Giorgi Kimadze
- Date of birth: 11 February 1992 (age 34)
- Height: 1.75 m (5 ft 9 in)
- Position: Left-back

Team information
- Current team: Gagra
- Number: 23

Youth career
- 2008–2009: Torpedo Kutaisi
- 2009–2011: Chikhura Sachkhere

Senior career*
Years	Team	Apps	(Gls)
2011–2014	Chikhura Sachkhere	62	(0)
2015–2019	Torpedo Kutaisi	140	(15)
2019–2022	Dinamo Tbilisi	26	(0)
2022–2023	Torpedo Kutaisi	33	(3)
2023	Shukura Kobuleti	3	(0)
2024–	Gagra	23	(1)

International career
2017–	Georgia	1	(0)
- * Club domestic league appearances and goals as of 10 December 2024

Giorgi Kimadze (Georgian: გიორგი ქიმაძე; born 11 February 1992) is a Georgian footballer who plays for Gagra.

He is the four-time winner of the national league and three-time winner of the Georgian Cup.

== International ==
He made his Georgia national football team debut on 25 January 2017 in a friendly game against Jordan.

== Honours ==
Torpedo Kutaisi

- Erovnuli Liga: (1) 2017
- Georgian Cup: (3) 2016, 2018, 2022
- Georgian Super Cup: (2) 2018, 2019

Dinamo Tbilisi

- Erovnuli Liga: (3) 2019, 2020, 2022
- Georgian Super Cup: (1) 2021
