= Nika Tchanturia =

Georgian association football player

Personal information
- Date of birth: 19 January 1995 (age 31)
- Place of birth: Zugdidi, Georgia
- Height: 1.80 m (5 ft 11 in)
- Position: Defender

Team information
- Current team: Locomotive (Sports director)

Youth career
- Locomotive

Senior career*
Years	Team	Apps	(Gls)
2011–2013	Locomotive	37	(3)
2013–2014	→ Torpedo Kutaisi (loan)	5	(0)
2013–2014	Locomotive	6	(1)
2014–2016	Dinamo Tbilisi	12	(0)
2015–2020	Locomotive	109	(0)
2021	Shukura	33	(1)
2022	Gagra	21	(0)
2023–2024	Locomotive	46	(2)

International career^{‡}
2011–2012	Georgia U17	9	(1)
2012–2014	Georgia U19	14	(0)
2014	Georgia U21	1	(0)
- * Club domestic league appearances and goals as of 15 January 2025 ‡ National team caps and goals as of 15 January 2025

Nika Tchanturia (Georgian: ნიკა ჭანტურია; born 19 January 1995) is a retired Georgian footballer who played as a central defender. He played in 302 official matches across all competitions and spent most of his career at Locomotive before announcing his retirement at 29.

Tchanturia captained two national youth teams and won the Georgian Cup in 2015 with Dinamo Tbilisi. He is also the two-time winner of the national supercup.

== Career ==
=== Club career ===
Tchanturia started his professional career at his childhood club Locomotive. On 9 October 2011, the 16 year-old player made his debut in a league match against Meshakhte in the 2nd division.

After taking part in 37 league games for Locomotive, Tchanturia was loaned to Torpedo Kutaisi in 2013. He made his first appearance in UEFA Europa League against MŠK Žilina on 7 July 2013.

In the summer of 2014, Tchanturia joined Dinamo Tbilisi, where shortly he was selected as captain at age 20. On 5 March 2015, Tchanturia sustained an injury in a 3–2 home win against Zestaponi, which saw him out of action for ten months following surgery on his cross ligaments performed in Stuttgart. Tchanturia returned to the pitch in a cup game against Torpedo on 16 December 2015, but as he later revealed, he never fully recovered.

In January 2016, Tchanturia signed a contract with Locomotive who he was to represent for next six seasons.

Before starting his final fourth spell at this club in 2023, Tchanturia played one season at Shukura, followed by another year at Gagra

On 13 January 2025, Tchanturia announced his decision to retire citing his injury problems. On the same day, he was appointed as Locomotive's sports director.

=== International ===
Chanturia was the captain of U17s who made history by reaching semifinals of the 2012 UEFA European Under-17 Championship. He had scored in a 2–1 win over Moldova in the 1st qualifying round, helping the team advance into the next round.

A year later, Tchanturia took part in all six 2013 UEFA European U19 Championship qualifiers. He was also called up to U21s, making his debut in a 1–0 away win against Holland.

== Statistics ==
=== Club ===
As of match played 8 December 2024

Appearances and goals by club, season and competition
Club	Season	League			National cup		Continental		Other		Total	
Club	Season	Division	Apps	Goals	Apps	Goals	Apps	Goals	Apps	Goals	Apps	Goals
Locomotive	2011–12	Pirveli Liga	17	0	1	0	–		–		18	0
Locomotive	2012–13	Pirveli Liga	20	3	2	0	–		–		22	3
Locomotive	2013–14	Pirveli Liga	6	1	–		–		–		6	1
Locomotive	2015–16	Umaglesi Liga	8	0	–		–		–		8	0
Locomotive	2016	Umaglesi Liga	1	0	1	0	–		–		2	0
Locomotive	2017	Erovnuli Liga	30	0	–		–		–		30	0
Locomotive	2018	Erovnuli Liga	29	0	1	0	–		–		30	0
Locomotive	2019	Erovnuli Liga	35	0	5	1	–		–		40	1
Locomotive	2020	Erovnuli Liga	6	0	–		1 (Note: Appearances in UEFA Europa League)	0	–		7	0
Locomotive	2023	Erovnuli Liga 2	20	2	2	0	–		1 (Note: Appearances in Erovnuli Liga playoffs)	0	23	2
Locomotive	2024	Erovnuli Liga 2	26	0	2	1	–		–		28	1
Locomotive	Total		198	6	14	3	1	0	1	0	214	9
Torpedo	2013–14	Umaglesi Liga	5	0	2	0	2	0	–		9	0
Dinamo Tbilisi	2014–15	Umaglesi Liga	12	0	2	0	–		1 (Note: Appearance in Georgian Super Cup)	0	15	0
Dinamo Tbilisi	2015–16	Umaglesi Liga	0	0	1	0	–		–		1	0
Dinamo Tbilisi	Total		12	0	3	0	0	0	1	0	16	0
Shukura	2021	Erovnuli Liga	33	1	4	0	–		2	0	39	1
Gagra	2022	Erovnuli Liga	21	0	1	0	–		2	0	24	0
Career total			269	7	24	2	3	0	6	0	302	9

== Honours ==
Dinamo Tbilisi

- Georgian Cup: 2014–15
- Georgian Super Cup: 2015, 2016

== Personal life ==
Tchanturia is married to model, football blogger and anchor Nia Tsivtsivadze, the granddaughter of Murad Tsivtsivadze (1943–2020), who was a member of Torpedo Kutaisi as a goalkeeper, captain and later head coach and guided the club to promotion to the Soviet Top League in 1981.
