= Levan Gegetchkori =

Georgian footballer (born 1994)

Personal information
- Date of birth: 5 June 1994 (age 32)
- Place of birth: Martvili, Georgia
- Height: 1.83 m (6 ft 0 in)
- Position: Right back

Team information
- Current team: Samgurali
- Number: 13

Senior career*
Years	Team	Apps	(Gls)
2012–2015	Merani Martvili	87	(3)
2015–2016	Shukura Kobuleti	26	(1)
2016	Dinamo Batumi	14	(2)
2017	Chikhura Sachkhere	7	(0)
2017	Dinamo Tbilisi	18	(2)
2018	Rustavi	14	(0)
2018–2019	Torpedo Kutaisi	32	(2)
2019–2021	Dinamo Batumi	29	(0)
2022–2023	Torpedo Kutaisi	23	(0)
2024–2025	Gagra	49	(3)
2026–	Samgurali	17	(0)

International career^{‡}
2012–2013	Georgia U19	7	(0)
2015–2016	Georgia U21	6	(0)
2017–	Georgia	1	(0)
- * Club domestic league appearances and goals as of 10 July 2026 ‡ National team caps and goals as of 14 December 2017

Levan Gegetchkori (Georgian: ლევან გეგეჭკორი, romanized: levan gegech'k'ori, pronounced [levan ɡeɡetʃʼkʼoli]; born 5 June 1994) is a Georgian professional footballer who plays as a defender for Erovnuli Liga club Samgurali.

He was a member of the Georgia national football team. He made his debut in 2017 in a friendly game against Belarus.

== Honours ==
Dinamo Batumi

- Erovnuli Liga: 2021

Torpedo Kutaisi

- Georgian Cup: 2022
- Georgian Super Cup: 2018, 2019
