= Vladimir Gogberashvili =

Russian footballer and official

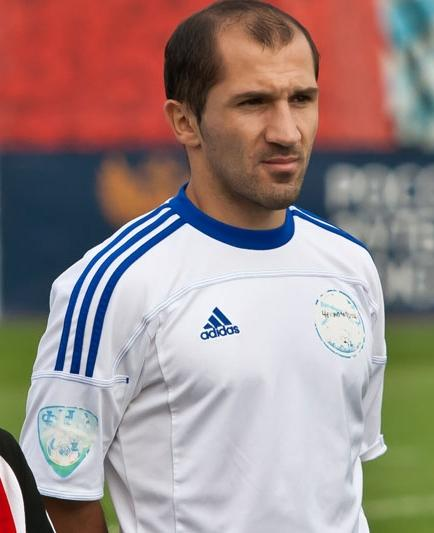
- Gogberashvili with Chernomorets Novorossiysk in 2011

Personal information
- Full name: Vladimir Olegovich Gogberashvili
- Date of birth: 16 April 1987 (age 39)
- Place of birth: Kutaisi, Georgian SSR
- Height: 1.65 m (5 ft 5 in)
- Positions: Winger; forward

Team information
- Current team: FC Mashuk-KMV Pyatigorsk (sporting director)

Senior career*
| Years | Team | Apps | (Gls) |
| 2004 | FC Dynamo Moscow | 0 | (0) |
| 2005 | FC Dynamo-3 Moscow | | |
| 2006–2008 | FC Mashuk-KMV Pyatigorsk | 96 | (12) |
| 2009 | FC Luch-Energiya Vladivostok | 19 | (0) |
| 2010 | FK Vėtra | 14 | (6) |
| 2010 | FK Sūduva | 12 | (1) |
| 2011 | FC Khimki | 14 | (0) |
| 2011 | FC Chernomorets Novorossiysk | 15 | (2) |
| 2012–2013 | FC Gazovik Orenburg | 23 | (2) |
| 2013–2014 | FC Tyumen | 34 | (8) |
| 2015 | FC Vityaz Krymsk | 14 | (1) |
| 2016–2017 | FC Olimpiyets Nizhny Novgorod | 47 | (7) |
| 2018 | FC Kolkheti-1913 Poti | 17 | (2) |
| 2019 | FC Aragvi Dusheti | | |
- * Club domestic league appearances and goals

Vladimir Olegovich Gogberashvili (Russian: Владимир Олегович Гогберашвили; born 16 April 1987) is a Russian professional football official and a former player. He is currently the sporting director of FC Mashuk-KMV Pyatigorsk.

== Club career ==
He made his Russian Football National League debut for FC Mashuk-KMV Pyatigorsk on 5 April 2006 in a game against FC Fakel Voronezh.

== Management career ==
At the end of the 2018-19 season, Gogberashvili decided to retire. He was hired as a sporting director ahead of the 2019-20 season for his former club FC Mashuk-KMV Pyatigorsk.

== Personal life ==
His twin brother Otar Gogberashvili is also a professional footballer.
