= Guja Rukhaia =

Russian footballer

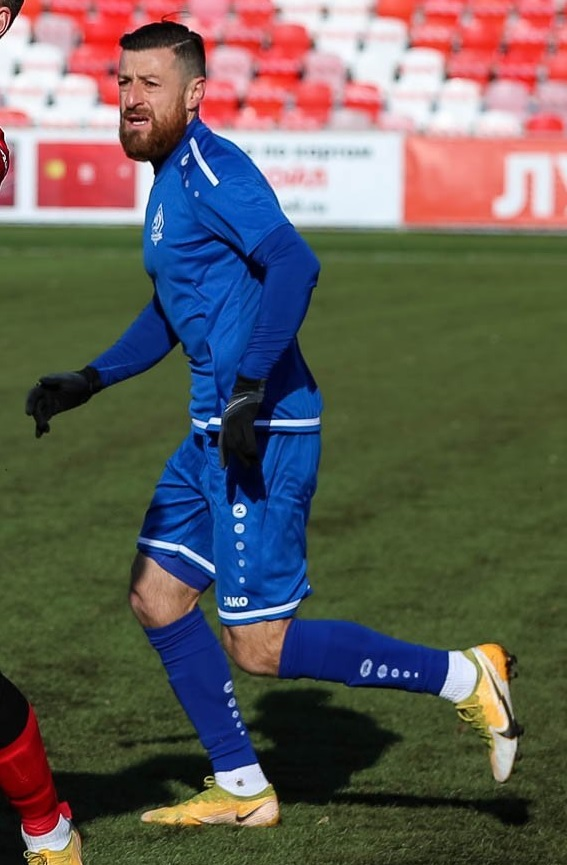
- Rukhaia with Dynamo Bryansk in 2021

Personal information
- Full name: Guja Georgiyevich Rukhaia
- Date of birth: 22 July 1987 (age 39)
- Place of birth: Batumi, Georgian SSR
- Height: 1.76 m (5 ft 9 in)
- Positions: Midfielder; defender

Youth career
- Dinamo Batumi
- FC Kazbegi Tbilisi
- –2005: Avtodor Vladikavkaz

Senior career*
Years	Team	Apps	(Gls)
2006	Chernomorets Novorossiysk	25	(0)
2007	Dynamo Stavropol	27	(1)
2008–2011	Zhemchuzhina-Sochi	117	(15)
2011–2014	Spartak Nalchik	61	(3)
2014–2015	SKA-Energiya Khabarovsk	29	(4)
2015	KAMAZ Naberezhnye Chelny	17	(0)
2016–2017	Sibir Novosibirsk	54	(2)
2018–2019	Dinamo Tbilisi	54	(2)
2020–2021	Samtredia	15	(0)
2021	Dynamo Bryansk	15	(0)
- * Club domestic league appearances and goals

Guja Rukhaia (Georgian: გუჯა რუხაია; Russian: Гуджа Георгиевич Рухаиа; born 22 July 1987) is a Russian former professional football player of Georgian descent.

== Club career ==
He joined Dinamo Tbilisi in 2018.
