= Jaisen Clifford =

South African soccer player

Personal information
- Full name: Jaisen Jaren Clifford
- Date of birth: 5 February 1996 (age 30)
- Place of birth: Trichardt, South Africa
- Height: 1.77 m (5 ft 10 in)
- Position: Forward

Team information
- Current team: Marumo Gallants
- Number: 9

Youth career
- SuperSport United

Senior career*
Years	Team	Apps	(Gls)
2015–2016	Gudja United	15	(2)
2016–2017	Mqabba	6	(0)
2017–2018	Stumbras	14	(0)
2019–2020	Condeixa	9	(1)
2021	Cape Town All Stars	3	(0)
2022	Van	15	(3)
2023	Van	8	(0)
2024	Etar Veliko Tarnovo	3	(0)
2024–2025	→ Sportist Svoge (loan)	32	(7)
2025–	Marumo Gallants	12	(3)
- * Club domestic league appearances and goals as of 4 January 2026

Jaisen Jaren Clifford (born 4 February 1996) is a South African soccer player who plays as a forward for Marumo Gallants.

== Career ==
In 2015, Clifford signed for Maltese second tier side Gudja United. In 2017, he signed for Stumbras in the Lithuanian top flight, helping them win the 2017 Lithuanian Football Cup, their only major trophy. In 2019, he signed for Portuguese third tier club Condeixa. Before the second half of 2020–21, Clifford signed for Cape Town All Stars in the South African second tier, where he made 5 appearances and scored 1 goal. On 4 February 2021, he debuted for Cape Town All Stars during a 3–1 win over Bizana Pondo Chiefs. On 4 February 2021, Clifford scored his first goal for Cape Town All Stars during a 3–1 win over Bizana Pondo Chiefs. Before the second half of 2021–22, he signed for Armenian team Van.
