= Mykola Tsyhan =

Ukrainian footballer

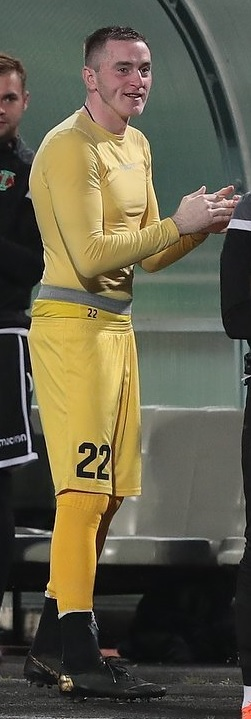
- Tsygan with Torpedo Moscow in 2019

Personal information
- Full name: Mykola Oleksandrovych Tsyhan
- Date of birth: 9 August 1984 (age 42)
- Place of birth: Mykolaiv, Ukrainian SSR
- Height: 1.90 m (6 ft 3 in)
- Position: Goalkeeper

Team information
- Current team: Akron — Konoplyov football academy (GK coach)

Youth career
- –2001: Mykolaiv

Senior career*
Years	Team	Apps	(Gls)
2001–2002	Mykolaiv	0	(0)
2003–2009	Alania Vladikavkaz	128	(0)
2010–2011	Krylia Sovetov Samara	3	(0)
2011–2012	Sibir Novosibirsk	44	(0)
2012–2013	Shinnik Yaroslavl	26	(0)
2013–2014	Spartak Nalchik	22	(0)
2014–2019	Sibir Novosibirsk	161	(0)
2019	Torpedo Moscow	6	(0)
2020–2021	Novosibirsk	21	(0)
2021–2022	Van	9	(0)
2022	Lada-Tolyatti	0	(0)
2023	Orgenergostroy Dimitrovgrad (amateur)		
Total		420	(0)

Managerial career
- 2022–2023: Academy Atom Dimitrovgrad (GK coach)
- 2024–: Akron — Konoplyov football academy (GK coach)
- * Club domestic league appearances and goals

Mykola Oleksandrovych Tsyhan (Ukrainian: Микола Олександрович Циган; born 9 August 1984) is a Ukrainian former football goalkeeper. He also holds Russian citizenship as Nikolay Aleksandrovich Tsygan (Russian: Николай Александрович Цыган).
