= Luka Razmadze =

Georgian footballer

Personal information
- Full name: Luka Razmadze
- Date of birth: 30 December 1983 (age 42)
- Place of birth: Gori, Georgian SSR, Soviet Union
- Height: 1.84 m (6 ft 0 in)
- Position: Midfielder

Youth career
- 2001–2002: Dila Gori

Senior career*
Years	Team	Apps	(Gls)
2002–2005	Dila Gori	74	(1)
2005–2010	WIT Georgia	140	(19)
2010–2014	Olimpi Rustavi	104	(13)
2014–2020	Dila Gori	118	(5)
2015–2016	→ Sioni Bolnisi (loan)	24	(2)
2020	Samgurali	16	(1)
2021	Merani Tbilisi	13	(0)

International career
2008–2010	Georgia	11	(0)
- * Club domestic league appearances and goals as of 20:08, 30 September 2020 (UTC)

Luka Razmadze (born 30 December 1983) is a Georgian footballer who played as a midfielder.

Razmadze is the two-time national league winner. He has also won the Georgian Super Cup twice and the Georgian Cup once. Razmadze made his Georgia debut on 11 October 2008 and late took part in ten more matches.

Individually, Razmadze holds the all-time record with most appearances in the Georgian top division.

== Career ==
Born in the city of Gori, Razmadze entered a local football school where he was noticed by Dila scouts. Initially, Razmadze played for the reserve team before being promoted to the senior team in 2002.

After three seasons, Razmadze moved to WIT Georgia where he clinched all three domestic titles. Following the 2008–09 season, he was named Midfielder of the Year by the Professional Football League. In 2009, Razmadze scored his first European goal in a 2–2 draw at Spartak Trnava, followed by his injury-time winner in the return leg.

In 2010, Razmadze joined Olimpi Rustavi. Two years later, his team, now renamed as Metalurgi, narrowly missed out on the Umaglesi Liga title after sharing points with Zestaponi, although Razmadze left the club with a Supercup trophy.

Razmadze emotionally celebrated a historic day of the league triumph with his hometown club Dila in 2015 when the dream of their fans came true.

At the later stage of his career, Razmadze was close to winning more cup titles, but in both cases his teams, Sioni and Samgurali, failed to win the final game of their cup campaigns. His individual feat was closely covered, though. On 22 September 2019, Razmadze, who captained Dila now, surpassed Aleksandre Koshkadze in the charts of players with most league appearances, reaching 446.

Razmadze spent the final two seasons of his twenty-year-long career in the 2nd division, before announcing retirement in June 2021.

Razmadze has accrued 453 top-tier appearances, making him the all-time Georgian record holder.

== Honours ==
WIT Georgia

- Umaglesi Liga: 2008–09;
- Georgian Cup: 2009–10
- Georgian Supercup: 2010

Olimpi Rustavi

- Umaglesi Liga runner-up: 2011–12
- Georgian Supercup: 2011

Dila

- Umaglesi Liga: 2014–15

Sioni

- Georgian Cup runner-up: 2015–16

Samgurali

- Georgian Cup runner-up: 2020
