= Mate Tsintsadze =

Georgian footballer (born 1995)

Personal information
- Date of birth: 7 January 1995 (age 31)
- Place of birth: Poti, Georgia
- Height: 1.79 m (5 ft 10 in)
- Position: Midfielder

Team information
- Current team: Gagra
- Number: 5

Youth career
- 2007–2011: Lokomotivi Tbilisi

Senior career*
Years	Team	Apps	(Gls)
2011–2013	Lokomotivi Tbilisi	51	(3)
2013	Torpedo Kutaisi	16	(1)
2014–2016	Dinamo Tbilisi	70	(8)
2017	Pogoń Szczecin	13	(0)
2017	Pogoń Szczecin II	12	(1)
2018	Rustavi	15	(2)
2018–2019	Torpedo Kutaisi	31	(1)
2019	Jelgava	8	(1)
2020	Dinamo Batumi	9	(1)
2021	Kukësi	15	(1)
2021–2023	Torpedo Kutaisi	44	(4)
2023–2024	Zhetysu	24	(0)
2024–	Gagra	83	(3)

International career
2011–2012	Georgia U17	7	(0)
2012–2014	Georgia U19	6	(2)
2014–2016	Georgia U21	9	(1)
2015	Georgia	2	(0)
- * Club domestic league appearances and goals as of 10 July 2026

Mate Tsintsadze (Georgian: მათე ცინცაძე; born 7 January 1995) is a Georgian professional footballer who plays as a midfielder for Erovnuli Liga club Gagra.

== Honours ==
Dinamo Tbilisi

- Georgian League: 2013–14, 2015–16
- Georgian Cup: 2013–14, 2014–15, 2015–16
- Georgian Super Cup: 2014, 2015

Torpedo Kutaisi

- Georgian Cup: 2018, 2022
- Georgian Super Cup: 2019
