= Lasha Totadze =

Georgian footballer

Personal information
- Full name: Lasha Totadze
- Date of birth: 24 August 1988 (age 38)
- Height: 1.87 m (6 ft 2 in)
- Position: Centre-back

Team information
- Current team: AFC Ambasadori
- Number: 3

Youth career
- 2005–2007: Gagra Tbilisi

Senior career*
Years	Team	Apps	(Gls)
2007–2008	Gagra	23	(4)
2008–2010	Dynamo Kyiv	0	(0)
2008–2009	Dynamo-2 Kyiv	14	(0)
2009–2010	Gagra Tbilisi	14	(1)
2010–2012	Győri ETO	8	(1)
2011–2012	→ Lombard Pápa (loan)	14	(0)
2012	→ Dila Gori (loan)	11	(0)
2012	Dinamo Batumi	6	(0)
2012–2013	Dila Gori	4	(0)
2013–2014	Sioni Bolnisi	20	(3)
2014–2015	Dinamo Tbilisi	26	(0)
2015–2016	Saburtalo Tbilisi	26	(0)
2016–2017	Sioni Bolnisi	13	(0)
2017–2019	Dinamo Tbilisi	47	(9)
2019	Nassaji Mazandaran	9	(1)
2019	Qizilqum Zarafshan	11	(2)
2020	Samtredia	8	(2)
2021	Aktobe	9	(0)
2021	Gagra	7	(1)
2022	Gareji Sagarejo	7	(0)
2023-	AFC Ambasadori	3	(1)

International career
2009–2010	Georgia U21	7	(2)
- * Club domestic league appearances and goals as of 14:27, 9 January 2022 (UTC)

Lasha Totadze (Georgian: ლაშა თოთაძე; born 24 August 1988) is a Georgian football player who most recently played for association football club Gareji as a centre-back.

== Career ==
The central defender began his career with FC Gagra Tbilisi and joined than in January 2008 to FC Dynamo-2 Kyiv.

He played for eight domestic clubs, including Dinamo Tbilisi in two spells. Totadze captained the team and took part in 103 matches in all competitions. In 2017, he was named Defender of the Year.

On 27 February 2021, Aktobe announced the signing of Totadze. On 23 June 2021, Aktobe announced that Totadze left the club by mutual consent.

In early 2022 he signed a contract with Gareji Sagarejo.

== Style of play ==
Lasha Totadze is a central defender, but he can also play as a left-back. He is also known for his ability to score from free kicks from long distances.

== Honours ==
Dinamo Tbilisi

- Georgian League: 2013–14
- Georgian Cup: 2013–14
- Super Cup: 2014

Dila Gori

- Georgian League: Runner-up 2012–13
- Georgian Cup: 2011–12
- Super Cup: Runner-up 2014
