= Tengiz Tsikaridze =

Georgian association football player

Personal information
- Date of birth: 21 December 1995 (age 30)
- Place of birth: Gori, Georgia
- Height: 1.79 m (5 ft 10 in)
- Position: Midfielder

Youth career
- Dila Gori

Senior career*
Years	Team	Apps	(Gls)
2013–2017	Dila Gori	71	(3)
2015	→ Shukura Kobuleti (loan)	9	(3)
2018–2019	Torpedo Kutaisi	38	(9)
2019	Dila Gori	7	(1)
2020–2021	Chikhura Sachkhere	12	(2)
2021	Tom Tomsk	4	(0)
2021–2022	Zhetysu	4	(0)
2022	Van	3	(0)
2022	Aragvi		
2023	Sioni Bolnisi	16	(3)
- * Club domestic league appearances and goals as of 1 August 2023

Tengiz Tsikaridze (Georgian: თენგიზ წიქარიძე; born 21 December 1995) is a Georgian football player.

== Club career ==
Tsikaridze made his debut in the Russian Football National League for FC Tom Tomsk on 27 February 2021 in a game against FC Alania Vladikavkaz.

On 30 July 2021, Tsikaridze signed for Kazakhstan Premier League club Zhetysu.

== Honours ==
Torpedo Kutaisi

- Georgian Cup: 2018
- Georgian Super Cup: 2018, 2019

Dila Gori

- Erovnuli Liga: 2014–15
