= Grigol Dolidze =

Georgian footballer

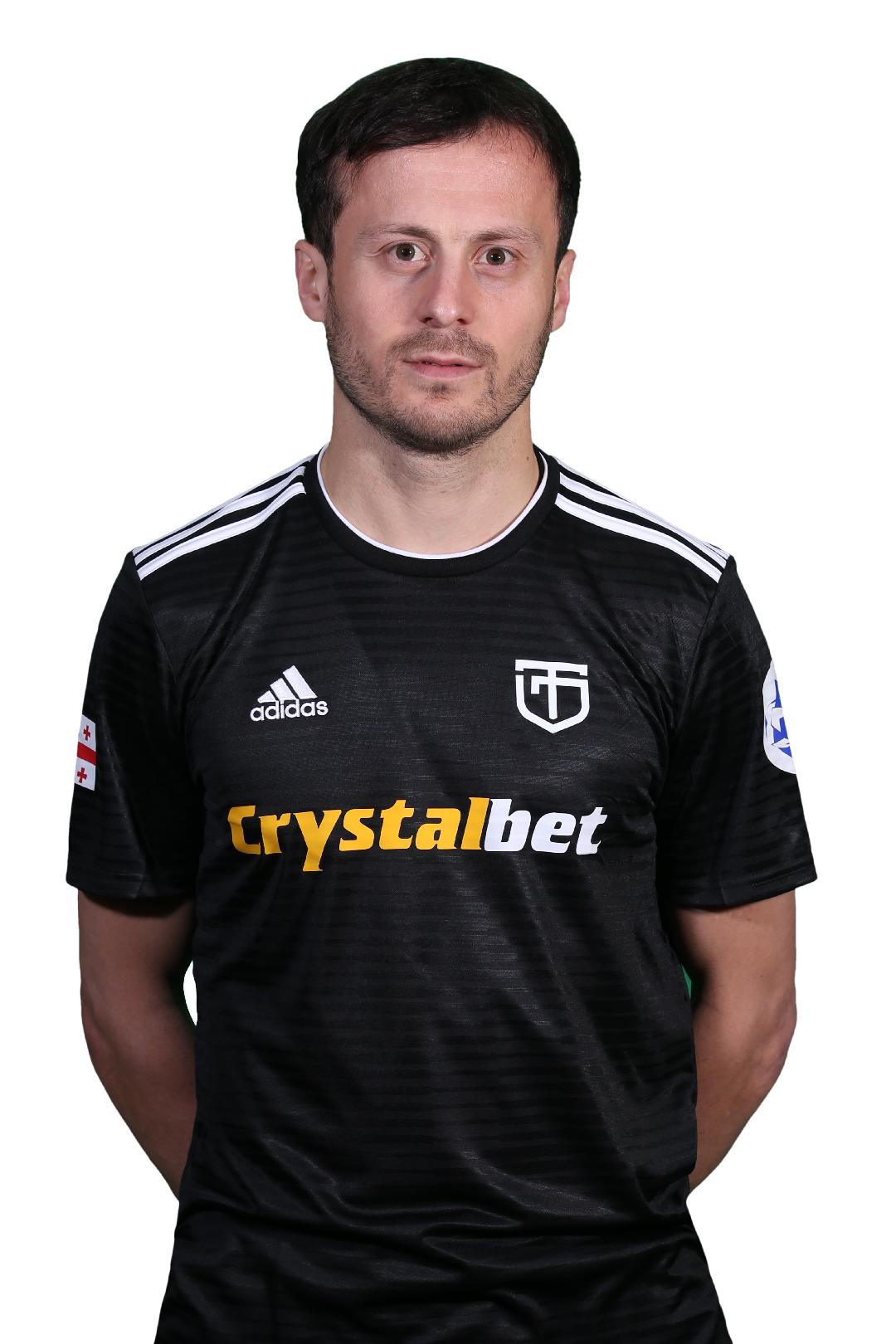
- Dolidze while playing for Torpedo

Personal information
- Date of birth: 25 October 1982 (age 44)
- Place of birth: Lanchkhuti, Georgian SSR
- Height: 1.80 m (5 ft 11 in)
- Position: Midfielder

Senior career*
Years	Team	Apps	(Gls)
2000–2001	Guria Lanchkhuti	37	(5)
2002–2003	Mertskhali Ozurgeti	45	(5)
2003–2004	Spartaki Tbilisi	17	(0)
2004–2006	Sioni Bolnisi	48	(13)
2006–2008	Ameri Tbilisi	60	(13)
2008–2009	Simurq Zaqatala	17	(0)
2009–2010	Olimpi Rustavi	2	(0)
2010–2013	Baia Zugdidi	8	(0)
2013	Dila Gori	7	(4)
2014	Zestafoni	15	(1)
2014–2015	Samtredia	24	(4)
2015–2016	Shukura	25	(1)
2016–2019	Torpedo Kutaisi	106	(18)
2020–2022	Samgurali	59	(5)

International career
2008	Georgia	3	(0)
- * Club domestic league appearances and goals

Grigol Dolidze (born 25 October 1982) is a Georgian coach and former professional footballer who played as a winger and attacking midfielder.

== Club career ==
As one of the longest-serving Georgian players, Dolidze has taken part in more than 400 official matches in the national top division.

Dolidze has won the Erovnuli Liga with Torpedo Kutaisi. As a champion's squad member, he was named in the 2017 team of the season. One of his two goals scored against Chikhura on 2 June 2017 was announced the Erovnuli Liga Goal of the Season.

His another memorable goal against Hajduk Split helped Dila reach the UEFA Europa League group stage qualification play-offs in August 2013.

Dolidze is also the four-time winner of the Georgian Cup.

In January 2023, at the age of 40 he announced his retirement after a 22-year-long career. He played for 14 teams in total with Samgurali being the last one.

== International career ==
Dolidze was capped three times for the Georgia national team.

== Coaching career ==
In 2025, Dolidze joined Torpedo as a coach at their football academy.

== Honours ==
- Erovnuli Liga (1): 2017
- Georgian Cup (4): 2006–07, 2007–08, 2016, 2018
- Georgian Super Cup (4): 2006–07, 2007–08, 2017, 2019
