= Bakar Mirtskhulava =

Georgian footballer

Personal information
- Date of birth: 24 May 1992 (age 34)
- Place of birth: Georgia
- Height: 1.87 m (6 ft 2 in)
- Position: Defender

Team information
- Current team: Odishi 1919
- Number: 3

Youth career
- –2008: Torpedo Kutaisi
- 2008–2011: Benfica

Senior career*
Years	Team	Apps	(Gls)
2011–2012	Torpedo Kutaisi	1	(0)
2013	Zimbru	7	(0)
2013–2014	Dinamo Zugdidi	38	(1)
2015–2016	Torpedo Kutaisi	27	(1)
2016	Shukura	13	(0)
2017–2018	Chikhura	61	(2)
2019	Dila	30	(0)
2020–2022	Torpedo Kutaisi	55	(2)
2022–2023	Samtredia	16	(0)
2023–2024	Gareji	43	(4)
2025–	Odishi 1919	18+	(1)
- * Club domestic league appearances and goals as of 11 July 2026

Bakar Mirtskhulava (Georgian: ბაქარ მირცხულავა; born 24 May 1992) is a Georgian footballer who plays as a defender for Georgian Erovnuli Liga 2 club Odishi 1919.

== Career ==
As a youth player, Mirtskhulava joined the youth academy of Georgian side Torpedo Kutaisi.

In 2008, he joined the youth academy of Benfica, the most successful club in Portugal. After that, he almost signed for Portuguese team Marítimo.

Before the second half of the 2012–13 season, Mirtskhulava signed for Zimbru in Moldova, where he made 7 appearances and scored 0 goals. On 3 March 2013, he debuted for Zimbru during a 0–2 loss to Nistru.

In 2013, Mirtskhulava signed for Georgian outfit Dinamo Zugdidi.

== Honours ==
Torpedo Kutaisi

- Georgian Cup: 2016, 2022
