= Nika Dzalamidze =

Georgian footballer

Personal information
- Date of birth: 6 January 1992 (age 34)
- Place of birth: Tbilisi, Georgia
- Height: 1.74 m (5 ft 9 in)
- Position: Winger

Youth career
- 2005–2007: Baia Zugdidi
- 2010: → CSKA Moscow (loan)

Senior career*
Years	Team	Apps	(Gls)
2007–2011	Baia Zugdidi	49	(15)
2011	→ Widzew Łódź (loan)	27	(3)
2012–2015	Jagiellonia Białystok	74	(7)
2013–2014	Jagiellonia Białystok II	3	(0)
2015–2016	Çaykur Rizespor	6	(0)
2016–2017	Górnik Łęczna	11	(0)
2017	Juventus București	10	(2)
2018	Dinamo Tbilisi	9	(1)
2018	Baltika Kaliningrad	13	(1)
2019–2020	Rustavi	9	(0)
2021–2022	Shukura Kobuleti	9	(0)
2022	Gudja United	10	(0)
Total		230	(29)

International career
2007–2008	Georgia U17	8	(3)
2009–2010	Georgia U19	6	(0)
2010–2014	Georgia U21	14	(1)
2012–2015	Georgia	7	(0)
- * Club domestic league appearances and goals

Nika Dzalamidze (Georgian: ნიკა ძალამიძე; born 6 January 1992) is a Georgian former professional footballer who played as a winger.

== Career ==
On 18 December 2009, CSKA Moscow signed Dzalamidze on loan from Baia Zugdidi.

In February 2011, he was loaned to Widzew Łódź on a one-year deal.
