= Gonio =

Gonio may refer to:

- goniometer, an angle measuring/indicating instrument
- Gonio (settlement), a small resort on the Black Sea coast of Georgia
  - Gonio Fortress, Roman fortification near the resort of Gonio, Georgia
  - FC Gonio, a football club based in Gonio
