= Tuzcuoğlu family =

Laz family

Tuzcuoğlu family was a prominent Ottoman-era family of regional notables (ayan) from the eastern Black Sea region, particularly active in Western Georgia and the Trabzon Eyalet. The family was known for its military leadership, tax farming (iltizam), and participation in local uprisings Against the Ottoman Empire.

== Origins and History ==
The first mention of the Tuzcuoğlu family appears in the 1763 Trabzon Şer‘iyye Sicili, where Tuzcuoğlu Ömer, the earliest known ancestor, is recorded as a bandit. In later records, the Tuzcuoğlus are referred to as the ayan (local notables) of Rize. This indicates that the family gradually eliminated rival notables and assumed control over the Rize ayanship from the 1760s onward.

One of the most prominent members was Tuzcuoğlu Memiş Agha, son of Hamdi Bey (a notable from Hopa) and nephew of Laz Aziz Ahmed Pasha. Between 1806 and 1809, he served as the commander of the Faş Castle, successfully defending it during a Russian siege in 1809, until its eventual capture following the Battle of Maltakva that same year. In 1811, he was appointed as the governor of Gönye Sanjak, a position he held until his rebellion in 1813. After his death, his son-in-law Kalcıoğlu Osman Bey and son Tuzcuoğlu Tahir led many more uprisings Against the Ottomans.

Although it is said that the Tuzcuoğlu family came from Konya, Turkish historian Şerif Sayın claims that they came from the same family and claims that the family left the region when the Ottomans conquered the region in the 16th century.

During the Turkish War of Independence, members of the family took part in political organizing, helping to found the Society for the Protection of National Rights and the Decentralization Society.

== Known members ==
- Tuzcuoğlu Ömer – First ever mentioned member of the family, recorded as a bandit in Ottoman archives.
- Hamdi Bey – A notable (eşraf) of Hopa and father of Memiş Agha.
- Laz Aziz Ahmed Pasha (?–1819) – Grand Vizier of the Ottoman Empire and uncle of Memiş Agha.
- Tuzcuoğlu Memiş Agha (1715–1817) – Governor of Gönye and commander of Poti Castle; the first member of the family to revolt Against the Ottoman Empire.
- Kalcıoğlu Osman Bey – Son in law of Memiş Agha and leader of the second revolt
- Ahmed (1803–?) – Son of Memiş Agha.
- Hurşid – Son of Ahmed.
- Mehmed – Son of Ahmed.
- Silahşör Osman Agha – Brother of Memiş Agha.
- Tahir Agha Tuzcuoğlu (?–1834) – Son of Osman Agha and the third family member to revolt Against the Ottomans; also fought in the Russo-Turkish War (1828–1829).
- Abdülaziz Agha (?–1834) – Son of Osman Agha; commander in the Russo-Turkish War; executed with his brothers in 1834.
- Abdülkadir Agha (?–1834) – Another son of Osman Agha and Russo-Turkish War commander; executed in 1834.
- Hamid – Son of either Tahir or Abdülaziz Agha; captured during the 1834 rebellion.
- Ârif – Son of either Tahir or Abdülaziz Agha; captured in 1834.
- Behram – Son of either Tahir or Abdülaziz Agha; captured in 1834.
- Ömer – Son of either Tahir or Abdülaziz Agha; captured in 1834.
- Tuzcuzâde Seyyid Osman – "Silâhşorân-ı hâssa" (guard) of Mahmud II
- Seyyid Tâhir Ömer – Son of Seyyid Osman
- Seyyid Tâhir Ömer – Son of Seyyid Osman
- Seyyid Abdülhâlid – Son of Seyyid Osman
- Seyyid Abdülaziz – Son of Seyyid Osman
- Seyyid Abdülhamid – Son of Seyyid Osman
- Tuzcuzâde İsmail Agha – Mentioned in the 1850 Rize tithe tax records.
- Tuzcuzâde Şakir Agha – Mentioned in the 1850 Rize tithe tax records.
- Tuzcuzâde Mahmud Agha – Mentioned in the 1850 Rize tithe tax records.
- Tuzcuzâde Reşid Agha – Mentioned in the 1850 Rize tithe tax records.
- Tuzcuzâde Mehmed Agha – Mentioned in the 1850 Rize tithe tax records.
- Tuzcuzâde Mustafa Agha – Mentioned in the 1850 Rize tithe tax records.
- Tuzcuzâde Hamid Agha – Mentioned in the 1850 Rize tithe tax records.
- Hacı Ârif Agha – Listed in an 1880 government document as one of Rize’s most influential figures.
- Tuzcuoğlu Mahmud Agha – Also listed in 1880; served as Mayor of Rize in 1881.
- Hacı Mehmed Agha – Listed in 1880 as one of the most influential figures in Rize.
- İsmail Agha – Listed in 1880 among the notable figures of Rize.
- Hurşid Efendi – Listed in 1880 as one of the most influential figures in Rize.
- Ekşioğlu Haşan (?–1914) – Killed in Bergmann Offensive
- Ekşioğlu Hüseyin (?–1914) – Brother of Haşan, was also killed in Bergmann Offensive
- Tuzcuoğlu Şaban Efendi – Founder of the Decentralization Society.
- Hakkı Efendi – Member of the Decentralization Society.
- Tuzcuoğlu Süleyman Tevfik Efendi – Founder of the Society for the Protection of National Rights.
- Tuzcuoğlu Halid Agha (1874–1936) – Commander during the Turkish War of Independence.

== Revolts Against Ottoman Empire ==
Tuzucoglu Rebellions
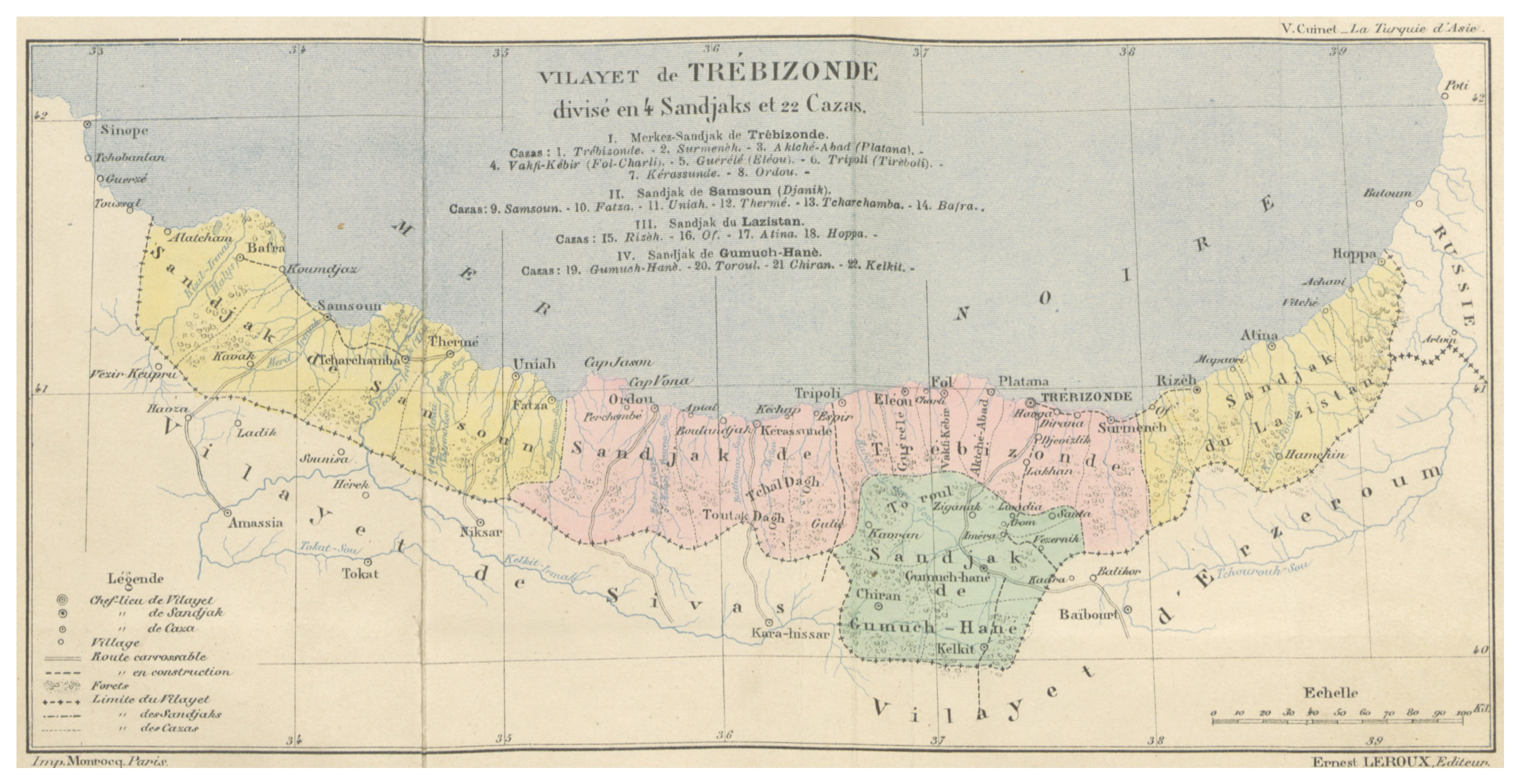
Date	1814–1841
Location	Trabzon Eyalet
Result	See results: 1st revolt:Ottoman victory 2nd revolt:Laz victory 3rd revolt:Ottoman victory; Ottomans agreed to reduce taxes; Decline and end of derebey rule

Belligerents
Laz Derebeys	Ottoman Empire

Commanders and leaders
Leaders: Tuzcuoğlu Memiş Agha (executed); Kalcıoğlu Osman Bey; Tahir Agha Tuzcuoğlu † Commanders: See list: Tirebolulu Kel Alioğlu (surrendered) Abanozoğlu Süleyman (surrendered) Tonyalı Hacı Salihoğlu (surrendered) Hacı Mustafa Bey (surrendered) Genç Mehmed Agha (surrendered) Bacıoğlu İsmail Agha (surrendered) Suiçmezoğlu Hasan Agha (surrendered) Tufan Agha (surrendered) Çebioğlu Yakup Agha (surrendered) Deli Ahmet Agha (DOW) Dedezade Süleyman (POW) Hacısalihoğlu Ali (WIA) Pir Ali Agha (surrendered) Hacıfettahoğlu (surrendered) Kethüda Mehmet Agha (MIA) Ârif Bey (POW) Behram Bey (POW) Hamid Bey (POW) Ömer Bey (POW) Abdülkadir Agha (executed) Abdülaziz Agha (executed) Emin Agha (surrendered) Cafer Agha Batumlu Aslan Bey Hopalı Mustafa Bey †	Mahmud II (Sultan) Commanders and governors: See list: Hazinedârzâde Süleyman Pasha # Hacı Hasan Agha (POW) Ali Pasha Mikdad Agha Şatırzâde Osman Agha Rize Mütesellimi Tahir Agha Çeçenzâde Hasan Agha (WIA) Koca Hüsrev Mehmed Pasha (WIA) Sadrazam Ali Pasha Salih Pasha (surrendered) Mehmed Agha (surrendered) Çıldır Derebeyi Ahmet Pasha Kaymakam Ahmet Pasha Kethüda Ahmet Pasha † Hacısalihoğlu Tufan Agha Uzunzade Mehmet Agha Mirmiran Şatırzade Osman Agha † Musa Agha (WIA) Kumbasaroğlu Süleyman (POW) Karamahmutoğlu (POW) Cansızoğlu Cafer Agha (surrendered) Sarıalioğlu Ömer (surrendered) Kahyaoğlu Emin Agha Hacısalihoğlu Ali Agha Ismail Bey Esad Pasha Hazinedârzâde Osman Pasha # Karslı Ahmet Pasha (WIA) Memiş Suiçmezoğlu Emin Agha

=== First Revolt (1814–1817) ===
The first major uprising involving the Tuzcuoğlu family occurred between 1814 and 1817. It was led by Tuzcuoğlu Memiş Agha, a prominent derebey (local notable) from the Sürmene region of the Trabzon Eyalet. The rebellion was a response to the centralizing reforms initiated by Sultan Mahmud II, which aimed to curtail the autonomy and influence of regional ayans (notables). Tensions escalated when the Ottoman-appointed governor, Hazinedaroğlu Süleyman Pasha, attempted to diminish the power of local lords by enforcing new administrative and fiscal policies. In retaliation, Tuzcuoğlu Memiş Agha mobilized a coalition of derebeys from Rize, Of, and Sürmene, leading an armed resistance Against the Ottoman authorities. The rebels managed to assert control over several towns, temporarily forcing Ottoman troops to retreat. However, the rebellion was ultimately suppressed by the superior resources and reinforcements of the Ottoman military. Tuzcuoğlu Memiş Agha was captured and executed in 1817, marking the end of the first uprising and a significant step in the Ottoman Empire's efforts to consolidate central authority in the region.

=== Second Revolt (1818–1821) ===
Following the execution of Tuzcuoğlu Memiş Agha in 1817, his son Ahmed Agha and his son-in-law Kalcıoğlu Osman Bey took up leadership of the resistance. Although exiled, both returned to the region and gained widespread support among the local derebeys and population, especially in Sürmene and Of.

The rebellion began in 1818 and focused on resisting excessive taxation and central authority. Rebels were able to control parts of the Trabzon Eyalet and mounted a strong defense using the region’s mountainous terrain. Ottoman attempts to fully subdue the uprising proved unsuccessful.

Eventually, a negotiated settlement was reached around 1821. The Ottoman government reduced taxes in the region and offered limited concessions to the local population. Although the derebey system was not formally restored, this marked a rare instance where the rebels achieved partial success through armed resistance.

=== Third Revolt (1832–1834) ===
The third and final major revolt occurred between 1832 and 1834, led by Tahir Agha Tuzcuoğlu, the son of Osman Agha. This uprising was fueled by increasing dissatisfaction with the centralization policies of Sultan Mahmud II, which threatened the autonomy of local feudal lords (derebeys) in the eastern Black Sea region. The rebellion garnered support from various local leaders and communities, particularly in the coastal towns of Trabzon and Rize.

The rebels initially achieved significant successes, managing to control key areas and even laying siege to Trabzon. However, the Ottoman response was swift and forceful. Under the command of Osman Pasha, the imperial forces launched a comprehensive military campaign to suppress the uprising. By 1834, the rebellion was quelled, with many rebel leaders captured, executed, or exiled. Tahir Agha himself was killed during the conflict. This suppression marked the end of the Tuzcuoğlu family's significant influence in the region and the dissolution of the derebey system in the eastern Black Sea area.

=== Minor uprisings (1839–1841) ===
The surviving member of the Tuzcuoğlu family, Cafer Agha, hid in the mountains of Of with a few followers. He was invited to conspire Against Osman Pasha, but the plot failed when Emin Kahyaoğlu (former Agha of Sürmene and governor of Tirebolu) defected. The people of Sürmene did not rebel Again, but in September 1839, the people of Rize took up arms for the last time. Osman Pasha sent 4,000 soldiers under the command of the defected Emin Agha. In October, the Agha of Rize, Memiş Suiçmezoğlu, retreated to İspir, and "Emin Agha effectively established order in the region.

The sons of the former Eynesil and Of feudal lords took advantage of Osman Pasha's death in 1841 to lead minor uprisings. However, the Laz people did not rebel Again.

== Aftermath and modern day ==
The fact that no name from Tuzcuoğulları was mentioned in the list of bandits in Rize in 1853 shows that the family no longer had any disagreements with the central government.

With the surname law of 1934, family members generally took the surname Tuzcu or Tuzcuoğlu. In line with the administrative tradition and real estate wealth of the Ottoman period, the Tuzcuoğlu family continued to be a part of Rize during the Republican period. However, a significant portion of the family lives in the center of Rize, in the Pîrîçelebi, Kambursırt and Tophane neighborhoods around Memiş Agha's mansion. Tahsin Agha Mansion is one of the three mansions belonging to Tuzcuoğlu family.
