= Lazistan Sanjak =

Ottoman province in northeastern Anatolia

Lazistān Sancağı Lazistan Sanjak
- Sanjak of Ottoman Empire
- 1551–1925
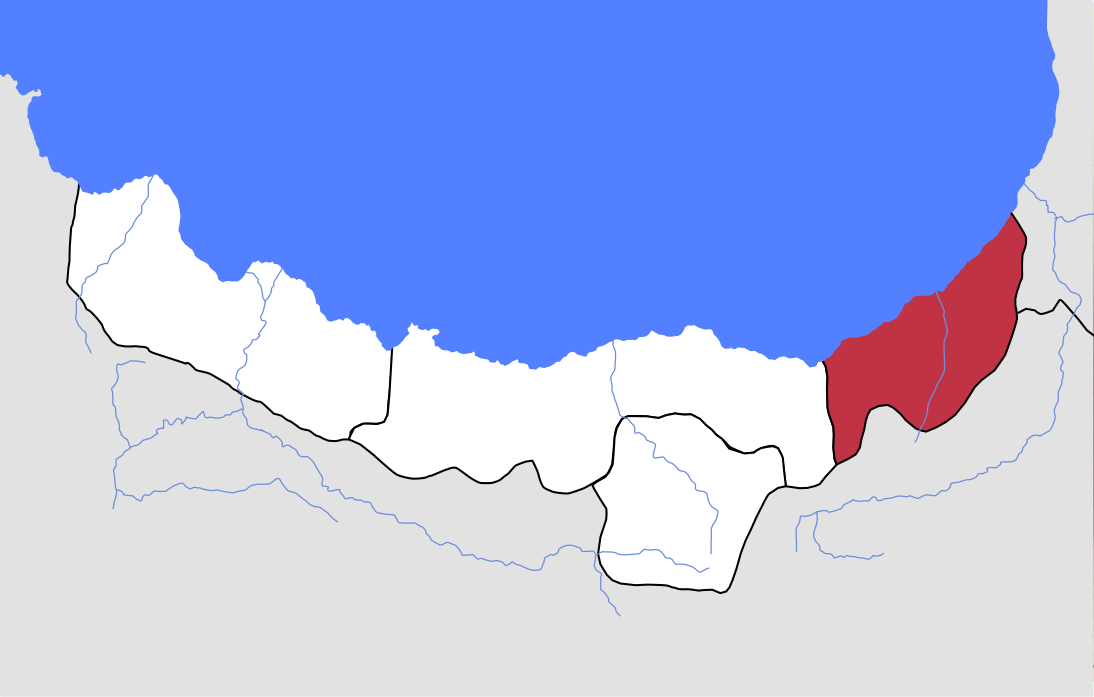
- Lazistan Sanjak within the Trebizond Vilayet in 1890
- Capital: Batumi (until 1878); Rize (1878–1925)
- Area
  - Coordinates: 40°55′54″N 40°50′52″E
  - 1873: 7,000 km^{2} (2,700 sq mi)
- Population
  - 1873: 400,000
- History
  - Ottoman invasion of Lazistan: 1551
  - incorporated to Erzurum Eyalet: 1578
  - Trebizond Eyalet: 1598
  - Trebizond Vilayet: 1867
  - according to Treaty of Berlin eastern portion of Lazistan sanjak became part of the Batum Oblast of Russian Empire: 1878
  - Abolished by Republic of Turkey: 1925
Preceded by	Succeeded by
Principality of Guria; Lazia (theme)	Batum Oblast; Rize Province
- Today part of: Turkey; Georgia

Lazistan (Laz: ლაზონა / Lazona, (Note: "(neologism, since 1991).") ლაზეთი / Lazeti, ჭანეთი / Ç'aneti; Ottoman Turkish: لازستان, Lazistān) was the Ottoman administrative name for the sanjak, under Trebizond Vilayet, comprising the Laz or Lazuri-speaking population on the southeastern shore of the Black Sea. It covered modern day land of contemporary Rize Province and the littoral of contemporary Artvin Province.

== History ==
After the Ottoman conquest of Trebizond Empire and later Ottoman invasion of Guria in 1547, Laz populated area known as Lazia became its own distinctive area (sanjak) as part of eyalet of Trabzon, under the administration of a Governor who governed from the town of Rizaion (Rize). His title was "Lazistan Mutasserif"; in other words "Governor of Lazistan". The Lazistan sanjak was divided into kazas, namely those of: Ofi, Rizaion, Athena, Hopa, Gonia and Batum.

Not only the Pashas (governors) of Trabzon until the 19th century, but real authority in many of the kaza (districts) of each sanjak by the mid-17th century lay in the hands of relatively independent native Laz derebeys ("valley-lords"), or feudal chiefs who exercised absolute authority in their own districts, carried on petty warfare with each other, did not owe allegiance to a superior and never paid contributions to the sultan. This state of insubordination was not really broken until the assertion of Ottoman authority during the reforms of the Osman Pasha in 1850s.

In 1547, Ottomans acquired the coastal fortress of Gonia, which served as capital of Lazistan; then Batum until it was acquired by the Russians in 1878, throughout the Russo-Turkish War, thereafter, Rize became the capital of the sanjak. The Muslim Lazs living near the war zones in Batumi Oblast were subjected to ethnic cleansing; many Lazes living in Batumi fled to the Ottoman Empire, settling along the southern Black Sea coast to the east of Samsun and Marmara region.

Around 1914 Ottoman policy towards the Christian population shifted; state policy was since focused to the forceful migration of Christian Pontic Greek and Laz population living in coastal areas to the Anatolian hinterland. In the 1920s Christian population of the Pontus were expelled to Greece.

In 1917, after the Russian Revolution, Lazs became citizens of Democratic Republic of Georgia, and eventually became Soviet citizens after the Red Army invasion of Georgia in 1921. Simultaneously, a treaty of friendship was signed in Moscow between Soviet Russia and the Grand National Assembly of Turkey, whereby southern portions of former Batum Oblast - later known as Artvin, was awarded to Turkey, which renounced its claims to Batumi.

The autonomous Lazistan sanjak existed until the end of the empire in 1923. The designation of the term of Lazistan was officially banned in 1926, by the Kemalists. Lazistan was divided between Rize and Artvin provinces.

== Population ==
The population of Lazistan was made up of Sunni Muslim Laz, Turks, and Hemshin people. The Christian population were around and made up of Pontic Greeks and Armenian Apostolic Christians.

Population of Lazistan in 1914
Kaza (district)	Muslim	Greek	Armenian	Jewish	Others	Total
Rize	122.055	1,507	5	-	-	123.567
Atina	50,297	171	28	-	-	50.496
Hopa	38,156	44	2	-	-	38,202
Total	210,508	1,722	35	-	-	212,265

== Religion ==
The Ottomans fought for three centuries to destroy the Christian-Georgian consciousness of the Laz people. The execution of the Three Hundred Laz Martyrs took place on Mt. Dudikvati (lit. “the place of beheading”) and on Mt. Papati (lit. “the place of the clergy”) respectively. The beheading of some three hundred Laz warriors on a single mountain between the years 1600 and 1620 and the martyrdom of the clergy at one local monastery was what occurred during this massacre, and resulted in the dissolution of the Clergy and subsequent conversion to Islam or Hellenization of the Laz people. Local orthodox inhabitants, once subordinated to the Georgian Orthodox Church, had to adhere to the rules of the Patriarchate of Constantinople. Part of the native population became targets of the Ottoman Islamization policy and gradually converted to Islam, while the second part of the people who remained orthodox subordinated to the Greek Church, thus gradually becoming Greeks as part of the process known as the Hellenization of Laz people. Lazs who were under the control of Constantinople soon lost their language and self-identity as they became Greeks and learned Greek, especially the Pontic dialect of Greek, although the Laz language was preserved by Lazs who had instead become Muslim.

== Economy ==
Historically, Lazistan was known for producing hazelnuts, which were exported to and from Trabzon. Lazistan also produced zinc, producing over 1,700 tons in 1901.

== See also ==
- Laz people
- Ajaria
- Pontus
