= Tuzcuoğlu Rebellions =

Series of uprisings in the Ottoman Empire (1814–1834)

- Part of Rebellions in the Ottoman Empire
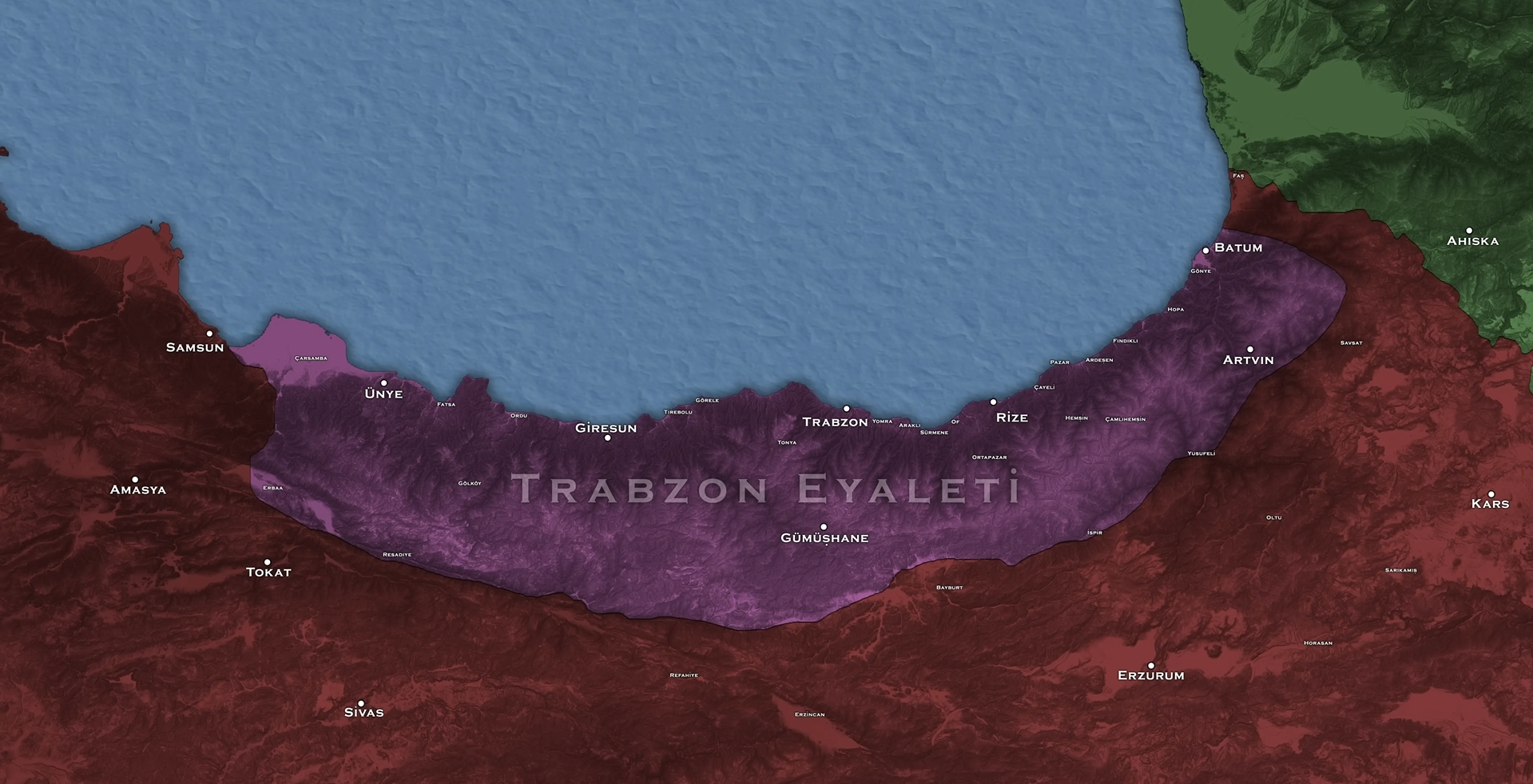
- Trabzon province in the 1830s
Date	1814–1834
Location	Trabzon Eyalet, Lazistan Sanjak
Result	Ottoman victory: Rebellions were suppressed

Belligerents
Ottoman Empire: Trabzon Eyalet	Laz Derebeys: Tuzcuoğlu Faction; Hacısalihoğlu family; Kalcıoğlu family; Dedezade family; Büberoğlu family; Gümrükçüoğlu family

Commanders and leaders
(1814–17) (Ottoman Empire) Hazînedarzâde Süleyman Pasha (Ottoman Empire) Governor of Kastamonu Ali Pasha (1818–21) (Ottoman Empire) Hüsrev Mehmed Pasha (Ottoman Empire) Salih Pasha (Ottoman Empire) Kapucubaşı Mehmed Agha (Ottoman Empire) Çeçenzade Hasan Pasha (1832–34) (Ottoman Empire) Osman Pasha (Ottoman Empire) Aslan Ali Bey (Ottoman Empire) Şatırzade Osman Bey (Ottoman Empire) Kaymakam Ahmed Pasha	(1814–17); Tuzcuoğlu Memiş Agha (executed) (1818–21); Kalcıoğlu Osman Bey (surrendered); Hacısalihoğlu Ali (surrendered); Deli Ahmet Agha (POW); Dedezade Süleyman Bey (POW); Gümrükçüoğlu (surrendered); Ahmet Agha (Son of Memiş Agha) (surrendered) (1832–34); Tuzcuoğlu Tahir (surrendered); Abdülkadir Agha (executed); Abdülaziz (surrendered)

Strength
(1814–17); 30,000 (1818–21); Unknown (1832–34); 8,000 + 6,000 troops (approx.)	(1814–17) local forces gathered from Rize, Hopa, Of, Sürmene, Tonya, Tirebolu, and Giresun (1818–21); Unknown (1832–34); Several thousand, including 750 under Tahir Agha and 10,000 under Abdülkadir Agha (approx.)

Casualties and losses
Unknown	Unknown

The Tuzcuoğlu Rebellions (Note: Turkish: Tuzcuoğlu İsyanları) were a series of uprisings that took place between 1814 and 1834 in the Ottoman provinces of Trabzon and Lazistan, along the southeastern Black Sea coast. The revolts were led by the Tuzcuoğlu family, a powerful local ayan family based in the Rize region, in opposition to Ottoman efforts to strengthen central authority and reduce the autonomy of regional derebeys and ayans. Rivalry with the Hazinedaroğlu family and disputes over taxation, administration, and regional influence further contributed to the conflicts.

The rebellions occurred in three major phases: the revolt of Tuzcuoğlu Memiş Ağa (1814–1817), the uprising led by Kalcıoğlu Osman Bey and Ahmet Ağa (1818–1821), and the rebellion of Tuzcuoğlu Tahir, Abdülkadir, and Abdülaziz (1832–1834). Although the rebels temporarily controlled large parts of the eastern Black Sea region and briefly occupied Trabzon during the first rebellion, all three uprisings were eventually suppressed by the Ottoman government.

== Tuzcuoğlu Memiş Agha Rebellion (1814–17) ==
Hopa born Tuzcuoğlu Memiş Agha was the son of Hamdi Bey, one of the prominent figures of the region, and the nephew of Ahmet Pasha, the Governor of Erzurum. Following his distinguished service in the defense of the Faş Fortress against the Russians in 1809, he was appointed kapucubaşı in 1810 and, in 1812, became the guardian of the Batum Fortress and the bey of the Gönye district, replacing Hazînedarzâde Süleyman Pasha. Having become a notable figure both feared and respected in the eastern part of Trabzon, Memiş Agha was, according to some claims, accused of indebting peasants to seize their lands, engaging in trade, and fraudulently acquiring the inheritance of the deceased. (Note: "According to Ahmed Cevdet Pasha, contrary to this claim, in the memorandum dated 23 July 1818, Mehmet Emin Efendi, who brought the execution order for Tuzcuoğlu, reported that the people of Oflu, Sürmene, Lazistan, and Trabzon were entirely loyal to Tuzcuoğlu and supported him. This indicates that Memiş Ağa enjoyed considerable prestige among the people, which contradicts this claim.)

It is known that Trabzon Governor Hazinedarzade Süleyman Pasha, due both to his failure to repay his debt to Memiş Ağa and to seeing him as a threat to his own influence, repeatedly petitioned Istanbul against him; although the initial investigation produced a favorable outcome, it later turned against Memiş Ağa due to allegations that he protected bandits, and, upon Süleyman Pasha's insistence, Sultan Mahmud II approved the order for his execution. (Note: "As can be understood from the scribe's note on the execution order, Sultan Mahmud II, despite being aware of the injustice of the governor's request, perceived the elimination of a powerful ayan like Tuzcuoğlu as a gain for state authority: ‘‘The governor has written in this manner several times. If it is based on malice, let the blame be upon him; an order should be issued for his execution and removal.’’ In this way, he approved the governor’s request.)

Upon learning of the execution decree en route, Memiş Ağa withdrew to Rize and initiated resistance; the local notables of Rize, Hopa, Of, and Sürmene who had previously benefited from his patronage also supported him. The insurgents quickly took control of the wide region stretching from Hopa to Giresun; the Sürmene and Of forces besieged Trabzon, first capturing the port and then the fortress on 18 August 1816. Tirebolu and Tonya similarly fell into rebel hands with the support of other local ağas. Memiş Ağa sought to establish a de facto independent administration by appointing his own men as voyvodas in Trabzon and Giresun.

Realizing that the rebellion could not be suppressed with local forces, Hazînedarzâde Süleyman Pasharequested a navy and reinforcements from Istanbul; meanwhile, although government troops retook Giresun and Tirebolu, the rebels advanced as far as Gümüşhane and Şark-ı Karahisar. As a result of the campaign carried out with the thousands of soldiers gathered by the Pasha in Görele, a significant portion of the rebellion was suppressed, and through agreements reached with regional notables, Memiş Ağa was isolated.

Under pressure from the approximately 30,000 troops commanded by Ali Pasha, the Governor of Kastamonu, Memiş Ağa was abandoned by his followers and withdrew first to Rize and then to Of. Although the state initially proposed a pardon due to the ongoing war with Russia, this yielded no result. During the siege that began in May 1817 and lasted two months, Of was encircled from all sides; Memiş Ağa was captured on 26 October 1817. Despite being noted as over 100 years old, he was immediately executed and his head was sent to Istanbul.

== Rebellion Kalcıoğlu Osman Bey and Ahmet Agha (1818–21) ==
Following the suppression of the Tuzcuoğlu Memiş Ağa uprising, his son-in-law Kalcıoğlu Osman Bey was settled in Sürmene, while one of the leading figures of the previous revolt, Hacısalihoğlu Ali, was placed in Trabzon. Both men expressed their desire along with their retainers to return to their native districts, conveying these requests first to Hazînedarzâde Süleyman Pasha and later to his successor, the new governor of Trabzon, Hüsrev Mehmed Pasha. The governor's refusal, coupled with his rapprochement with the Şatırzade family, long-standing rivals of the Tuzcuoğulları, prompted the formation of a new rebellion. In this context, Kalcıoğlu joined forces with Hacısalihoğlu Ali of Vakıf (Vakfıkebir), Deli Ahmet of Görele, Alaybeyoğlu, Dedezade Süleyman who was Hacısalihoğlu's father-in-law and an ayan of Eynesil as well as the notable Gümrükçüoğlu, initiating a fresh uprising.

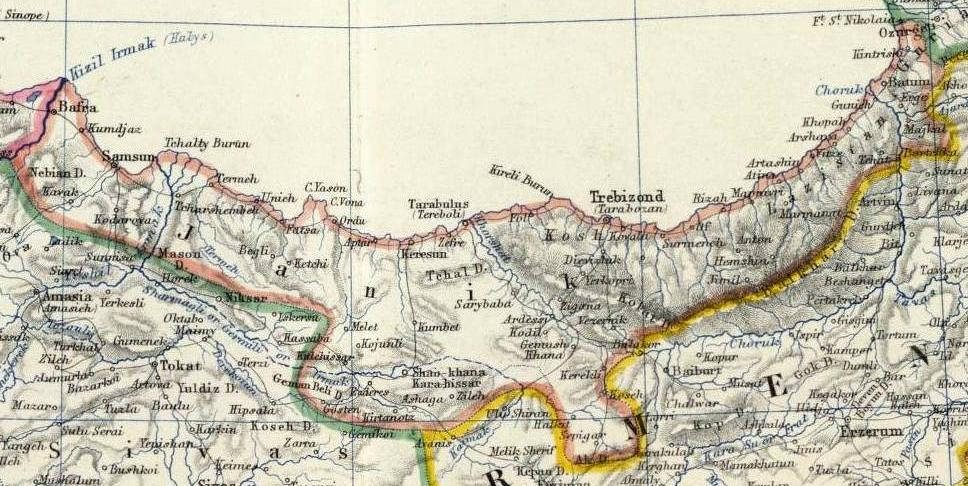
Trabzon province

Şatırzade Osman attempted to create discord between the Kalcıoğulları and Hacı Salihoğulları by negotiating with them separately, but these efforts failed. The rebellion effectively began when Dedezade Süleyman Bey, with a contingent of 200 men, launched an attack on government troops from Görele. In response, Hüsrev Pasha assembled forces from Canik, Lazistan and Şark-ı Karahisar and initiated a counteroffensive on 17 January 1819. He first besieged the mansion of Deli Mehmed Ağa and captured his men, then defeated and apprehended Dedezade Süleyman Bey, while forcing Kalcıoğlu Osman and Hacısalihoğlu Ali to retreat to Tonya. Other local families including the Bahadıroğulları, Hacı Fettahoğulları and Pir Ali were compelled to submit.

Believing the revolt to have been quelled, Hüsrev Pasha requested an imperial execution order for the rebels. Yet the movement, which had begun to disperse, soon reignited, and the prolongation of the conflict led the Porte to dismiss Hüsrev Pasha, replacing him with Salih Pasha. At this time, the Ottoman Empire was already burdened by war with Iran in the east and the outbreak of the Greek Revolt in the Morea. In such precarious circumstances, the central government refrained from sending additional forces against the Muslim populations of Trabzon and Rize, fearing further destabilization. Grand Vizier Ali Pasha therefore instructed Salih Pasha to pursue negotiations with the insurgents. Perceiving this conciliatory stance as a sign of weakness, Ahmed Ağa the son of Tuzcuoğlu Memiş Ağa residing in Of joined his brother-in-law Kalcıoğlu, seeking to avenge his father and thereby expanding the scope of the rebellion.

To restore order, the Porte dispatched Kapucubaşı Mehmed Ağa. His reception in the district of Çarşamba by several hundred rebels revealed how severely Ottoman authority had eroded across the eastern Black Sea region. Upon learning that the Çarşamba rebels were primarily protesting excessive taxation and abuses by tax collectors, Mehmed Ağa secured their return to their villages by cancelling their debts. Proceeding through Vakfıkebir and Trabzon to Rize, he gathered local scholars and townspeople, persuading them that the villagers should withdraw their support from the regional ağas. Consequently, Ahmed Ağa, Kalcıoğlu and Büberoğlu, deprived of their rural backing, were compelled to reach an agreement with the state. Mehmed Ağa additionally succeeded in dispatching a considerable number of villagers as soldiers to the Faş front(modern-day Poti region). His accomplishments earned him the post of mütesellim of Trabzon, and on his recommendation, Governor Salih Pasha was dismissed, with Kapudan-ı Derya Hüsrev Mehmed Pasha reinstated.

In 1825, following Hüsrev Pasha's departure, Çeçenzade Hasan Pasha was appointed governor of Trabzon. Tensions soon emerged between him and Şatırcızade Osman Bey, one of the ayans who had supported the state during the Tuzcuoğlu uprisings. In a petition dated 13 May 1825, Hasan Pasha accused Kalcıoğlu of behaving like an autonomous warlord and oppressing the populace, arguing that this weakened state authority and requesting an imperial decree to intervene. The imperial court, wary of destabilizing the delicate balance of regional power and risking a resurgence of the Tuzcuoğlu family, rejected punitive measures against Şatırcızade Osman Bey. Nevertheless, Kalcıoğlu was appointed to the Erzurum provisioning office on 11 June 1825 and removed from the region, thereby resolving the dispute.

== Rebellion of Tuzcuoğlu Tahir, Abdülkadir, and Abdülaziz (1832–34) ==
On 13 July 1831 Osman Pasha was appointed governor of the Trabzon Sanjak. Due to the Ottoman Empire’s ongoing diplomatic difficulties with Russia and Iran, he adopted a conciliatory approach in addressing local issues. This policy allowed members of the Tuzcuoğlu family, nephews of Tuzcuoğlu Memiş Ağa, to be assigned official posts: Tahir Ağa as mütesellim of Rize and Abdülkadir Ağa as kaymakam of Çürüksu. Despite these appointments, the Tuzcuoğulları began acting independently of the central government's orders, prompting Osman Pasha to issue several warnings. In response, the family complained to the Grand vizier about the governor.

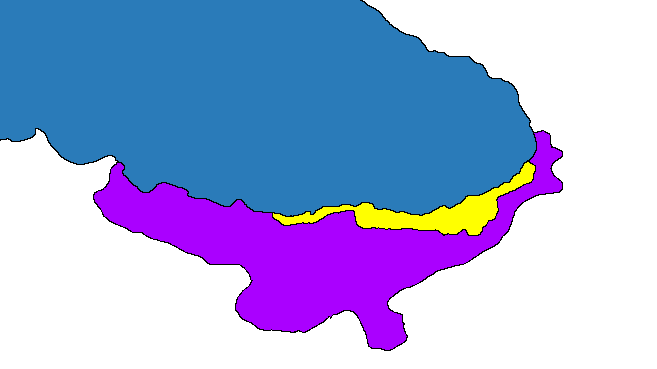
A map showing the Tuzcuoğlu rebellion.

During preparations for the Egyptian campaign, the Tuzcuoğulları raised 750 soldiers under Tahir Ağa and sent them to Osman Pasha's command. As the governor left Trabzon to join the campaign, the family initiated a rebellion. In September 1832, Abdülkadir Ağa, leading several thousand men, advanced on Gönye, capturing the fortress. He further claimed that he would take Trabzon next, alleging an agreement with Mehmed Bey, the Egyptian governor, to rally more supporters.

When Osman Pasha learned of the situation, he returned to the region. His subordinate, Aslan Ali Bey, son of Çıldır Beylerbeyi Ahmet Pasha, defeated the rebels Recep and Laz Aslan Bey on 30 October 1832, forcing them to join Abdülkadir Ağa. Meanwhile, Şatırzade Osman Bey and Kaymakam Ahmed Pasha successfully suppressed Tuzcuoğlu supporters in the Livana district. Although Abdülkadir Ağa initially had to seek pardon, he escaped Istanbul after 7–8 months with the help of his brother Tahir and returned to Rize. There, he used high taxation as a pretext to launch another rebellion, amassing a force of 10,000 men. Abdülkadir Ağa first advanced on Gönye, besieging the residence of its mütesellim Musa Bey, while Tahir Ağa in Sürmene spread propaganda claiming Osman Pasha had been dismissed and that he had allied with Egyptian governor Mehmed Ali Pasha to gather followers.

In response Osman Pasha dispatched 8,000 men, including Trabzonlu Hacı Salihzade and Tirebolu voyvoda Kethüzade Emin Ağa, to fight Tahir Ağa near Sürmene. Additionally, 6,000 soldiers and 10 ships under kethüda Ahmet Pasha were sent to support Gönye mütesellimi Musa Bey. Abdülkadir Ağa suffered heavy losses at Gönye and retreated towards Atina, while Tahir Ağa was unable to maintain control in Sürmene. Both eventually withdrew to their residences in Rize. When thousands of local villagers fortified these residences, intense fighting ensued, resulting in significant casualties. On 30 March 1834, the brothers abandoned Rize and sought refuge in Of.

Osman Pasha demanded that the people of Of surrender the rebels, even threatening them with a fine of 1,000 kese akçe. When the locals refused, 15,000 troops besieged Of and advanced toward Hundez, where the rebels were hiding. Abdülkadir Ağa, realizing he could not hold out in Of, fled with around 60 men to Kırzıy-ı Süfla in Bayburt and took refuge with Oflu Cansızoğlu Cafer Ağa. Bayburt voyvoda İsmail Bey, along with Sarı Alioğlu Ömer Ağa, besieged the residence. Initially intending to resist with 3,000–4,000 men, Abdülkadir Ağa was ultimately handed over due to threats against Cansızoğlu's men, leaving him with only a few hundred followers. He was sent to Erzurum Governor Esat Pasha, where he was executed. Tahir, Abdülaziz, and their sons initially went into hiding but were later pardoned and exiled to Ruschuk and Varna in December 1834.

A document from 1851 indicates that the population of Lazistan attempted to seek asylum in Russia to escape heavy taxation. However, as they were not recognized as political refugees, they were returned. This suggests that despite the establishment of central authority in the region, the economic situation remained difficult.

== Sources ==
- Özhan Öztürk. Pontus: Antik Çağ’dan Günümüze Karadeniz’in Etnik ve Siyasi Tarihi (Genişletilmiş 3. baskı) Nika Publishing. Ankara, 2016
- Akdağ, Mustafa, Osmanlı tarihinde ayanlık düzeni devri 1730 – 1839, Tarih Araştırmaları Dergisi, 1963
