= 2016 Umaglesi Liga =

Umaglesi Liga
- Season: 2016
- Dates: 7 August 2016 – 11 December 2016
- Champions: Samtredia; 1st Georgian title
- Relegated: Sioni Bolnisi; Guria Lanchkhuti; Tskhinvali; Zugdidi
- Champions League: Samtredia
- Europa League: Chikhura Sachkhere; Torpedo Kutaisi; Dinamo Batumi
- Matches: 86
- Goals: 212 (2.47 per match)
- Statistics include the championship final

The 2016 Umaglesi Liga was a special transitional season of top-tier football in Georgia. Dinamo Tbilisi were the defending champions. This transitional season is a result of the Georgian Football Federation's decision to change the Umaglesi Liga season from an Autumn–Spring schedule to a Spring–Autumn one. The season began on 7 August 2016 and concluded with the second leg of the championship final on 11 December 2016.

== Teams and stadiums ==
Sapovnela Terjola and Merani Martvili were relegated at the end of the previous season; they were not replaced. The league contracted from 16 teams to 14 this season; this will further be reduced to 10 for next season.

Locations of teams in 2016 Umaglesi Liga; the coloured marks represent the regular season group placing.

Team	Location	Venue	Capacity
Chikhura Sachkhere	Sachkhere	Tsentraluri Stadioni	2,000
Dila Gori	Gori	Tengiz Burjanadze Stadium	5,000
Dinamo Batumi	Kobuleti	Chele Arena	6,000
Dinamo Tbilisi	Tbilisi	Boris Paichadze Stadium	54,549
Guria Lanchkhuti	Lanchkhuti	Evgrapi Shevardnadze Stadium	8,000
Kolkheti Poti	Poti	Erosi Manjgaladze Stadium	5,000
Locomotive Tbilisi	Tbilisi	Mikheil Meskhi Stadium	27,223
Saburtalo Tbilisi	Tbilisi	Stadioni Bendela	2,000
Samtredia	Samtredia	Erosi Manjgaladze Stadium	5,000
Shukura Kobuleti	Kobuleti	Chele Arena	6,000
Sioni Bolnisi	Bolnisi	Tamaz Stepania Stadium	3,242
Torpedo Kutaisi	Kutaisi	Tsentraluri Stadioni	19,400
Tskhinvali	Tskhinvali	Mikheil Meskhis Sakhelobis; Stadionis Satadarigo Moedani	2,500
Zugdidi	Zugdidi	Tsentraluri Stadioni	2,000

Source: Scoresway

== Regular season ==
For this transitional season only, the 14 teams were divided into two groups of seven teams, Group Red and Group White. Each team played home-and-away against the other six teams within their own group only, resulting in 12 games each played (a decrease on the 30 games played in the previous season).

At the end of the regular season, the two group winners, Samtredia and Chikhura Sachkhere, met in the Championship final, this two-legged tie decided the overall champion and the berth for 2017–18 UEFA Champions League; the loser had the consolation of a berth in 2017–18 UEFA Europa League.

The four teams finishing in second and third in each group took part in the Bronze play-offs, the winning team clinched overall third place in the league (and bronze medals), and also a berth in 2017–18 UEFA Europa League.

The fifth and sixth-placed teams took part in relegation play-offs, the two losers joined the two bottom-placed teams in the 2017 Erovnuli Liga 2.

=== Group Red ===
Pos	Team	Pld	W	D	L	GF	GA	GD	Pts	Qualification or relegation
1	Samtredia (C, O)	12	8	3	1	27	9	+18	27	Qualification to Championship final
2	Dinamo Batumi (O)	12	5	5	2	20	5	+15	20	Qualification to Bronze play-offs
3	Saburtalo Tbilisi	12	5	4	3	17	12	+5	19	Qualification to Bronze play-offs
4	Kolkheti Poti	12	6	0	6	10	18	−8	18	
5	Dila Gori (O)	12	5	2	5	13	12	+1	17	Qualification to Relegation play-offs
6	Sioni Bolnisi (R)	12	3	2	7	13	19	−6	11	Qualification to Relegation play-offs
7	Zugdidi (R)	12	2	0	10	5	30	−25	6	Relegation to Erovnuli Liga 2

Source: UEFA, Soccerway
Rules for classification: 1) Points; 2) Head-to-head points; 3) Head-to-head goal difference; 4) Head-to-head goals scored; 5) Head-to-head away goals scored (only if two teams); 6) Goal difference; 7) Goals scored.
(C) Champions; (O) Play-off winners; (R) Relegated

Home \ Away	DIL	DBA	KOL	SAB	SAM	SIO	ZUG
Dila Gori	—	0–0	1–0	0–0	1–2	2–1	4–1
Dinamo Batumi	3–1	—	0–1	0–1	1–1	0–0	5–0
Kolkheti Poti	0–1	0–5	—	1–0	1–3	1–0	2–0
Saburtalo Tbilisi	2–1	0–0	6–1	—	2–2	1–1	3–1
Samtredia	0–2	1–1	2–0	3–0	—	4–1	1–0
Sioni	2–0	0–3	0–2	1–2	0–3	—	4–1
Zugdidi	1–0	0–2	0–1	1–0	0–5	0–3	—

Source: Soccerway
Legend: Blue = home team win; Yellow = draw; Red = away team win.

=== Group White ===
Pos	Team	Pld	W	D	L	GF	GA	GD	Pts	Qualification or relegation
1	Chikhura Sachkhere	12	9	2	1	27	11	+16	29	Qualification to Championship final
2	Dinamo Tbilisi	12	6	5	1	17	5	+12	23	Qualification to Bronze play-offs
3	Torpedo Kutaisi	12	4	3	5	16	12	+4	15 (Note: Torpedo Kutaisi ahead of Locomotive Tbilisi on head-to-head record; Locomotive Tbilisi–Torpedo Kutaisi 0–0, Torpedo Kutaisi–Locomotive Tbilisi 3–0.)	Qualification to EL first qualifying round and Bronze play-offs (Note: Torpedo Kutaisi qualified for the Europa League first qualifying round by winning the 2016 Georgian Cup.)
4	Locomotive Tbilisi	12	4	3	5	11	18	−7	15	
5	Shukura Kobuleti (O)	12	2	6	4	10	13	−3	12	Qualification to Relegation play-offs
6	Guria Lanchkhuti (R)	12	3	2	7	8	21	−13	11	Qualification to Relegation play-offs
7	Tskhinvali (R)	12	2	3	7	12	21	−9	9	Relegation to Erovnuli Liga 2

Source: UEFA, Soccerway
Rules for classification: 1) Points; 2) Head-to-head points; 3) Head-to-head goal difference; 4) Head-to-head goals scored; 5) Head-to-head away goals scored (only if two teams); 6) Goal difference; 7) Goals scored.
(O) Play-off winners; (R) Relegated
Notes:

Home \ Away	CHI	DIN	GUR	LOC	SHU	TKU	TSK
Chikhura Sachkhere	—	0–0	1–2	3–2	1–1	2–1	4–1
Dinamo Tbilisi	1–2	—	3–0	4–0	1–1	0–0	0–0
Guria Lanchkhuti	0–2	0–2	—	1–0	0–0	2–1	0–0
Locomotive Tbilisi	1–4	0–0	2–1	—	1–1	0–0	2–0
Shukura Kobuleti	1–3	0–1	3–1	0–1	—	2–1	1–3
Torpedo Kutaisi	0–3	0–1	5–0	3–0	0–0	—	3–1
Tskhinvali	1–2	2–4	2–1	1–2	0–0	1–2	—

Source: Soccerway
Legend: Blue = home team win; Yellow = draw; Red = away team win.

== Play-offs ==
The play-offs schedule was unveiled on 15 November 2016.

=== Bronze play-offs ===
Semi-finals
Torpedo Kutaisi	2	0	2
Dinamo Batumi (a)	1	1	2
Saburtalo Tbilisi	0	0	0
Dinamo Tbilisi	0	1	1

Final
Dinamo Batumi	1
Dinamo Tbilisi	0

==== Semi-finals ====
30 November 2016
18:00 UTC+4

Torpedo Kutaisi	2–1	Dinamo Batumi
Babunashvili 29' (pen.); Kimadze 65'	Report	Shonia 72'

Ramaz Shengelia Stadium, Kutaisi
Attendance: 1,000
Referee: Giorgi Kruashvili
4 December 2016
13:00 UTC+4

Dinamo Batumi	1–0	Torpedo Kutaisi
Kavtaradze 8'	Report

Chele Arena, Kobuleti
Attendance: 700
Referee: Davit Kharitonashvili

2–2 on aggregate. Dinamo Batumi won on away goals.

30 November 2016
17:00 UTC+4

Saburtalo Tbilisi	0–0	Dinamo Tbilisi
	Report

Mikheil Meskhi Stadium, Tbilisi
Attendance: 300
Referee: Irakli Kvirikashvili
4 December 2016
13:00 UTC+4

Dinamo Tbilisi	1–0	Saburtalo Tbilisi
Zaria 25'	Report

Boris Paichadze Dinamo Arena, Tbilisi
Attendance: 500
Referee: Jener Khorava

Dinamo Tbilisi won 1–0 on aggregate.

==== Final ====
10 December 2016
15:00 UTC+4

Dinamo Batumi	1–0	Dinamo Tbilisi
Shonia 16'	Report

Mikheil Meskhi Stadium, Tbilisi
Attendance: 300
Referee: Giorgi Vadatchkoria

Dinamo Batumi qualified for the 2017–18 Europa League first qualifying round.

=== Relegation play-offs ===
1 December 2016
14:00 UTC+4

Guria Lanchkhuti	0–2	Dila Gori
	Report	Dan Kowa 56'; Etou 82'

Evgrapi Shevardnadze Stadium, Lanchkhuti
Attendance: 400
Referee: Bakur Ninua
6 December 2016
13:00 UTC+4

Dila Gori	0–0	Guria Lanchkhuti
	Report

Tengiz Burjanadze Stadium, Gori
Attendance: 300
Referee: Goga Kikacheishvili

Dila Gori won 2–0 on aggregate and retained their place for 2017 Erovnuli Liga; Guria Lanchkhuti were relegated to 2017 Erovnuli Liga 2.

1 December 2016
14:00 UTC+4

Sioni Bolnisi	4–3	Shukura Kobuleti
Svanidze 16'; Sikharulidze 45+2', 85'; Vasadze 72'	Report	Komakhidze 9'; Konyeha 18'; Shalamberidze 84'

Tamaz Stepania Stadium, Bolnisi
Attendance: 1,500
Referee: Giorgi Vadatchkoria
6 December 2016
13:00 UTC+4

Shukura Kobuleti	2–0	Sioni Bolnisi
Guruli 40'; Jefinho 90+4'	Report

Chele Arena, Kobuleti
Attendance: 1,500
Referee: Arsen Nonikashvili

Shukura Kobuleti won 5–4 on aggregate and retained their place for 2017 Erovnuli Liga; Sioni Bolnisi were relegated to 2017 Erovnuli Liga 2

=== Championship final ===
A draw was made on 28 November 2016 to determine the order of the legs.

3 December 2016
14:00 UTC+4

Samtredia	2–0	Chikhura Sachkhere
Zivzivadze 18', 40'	Report

Erosi Manjgaladze Stadium, Samtredia
Attendance: 2,000
Referee: Lasha Silagava
11 December 2016
13:30 UTC+4

Chikhura Sachkhere	2–2	Samtredia
Dekanoidze 82'; Lobzhanidze 90' (pen.)	Report	Arabuli 42' (pen.); Datunaishvili 59'

Boris Paichadze Dinamo Arena, Tbilisi
Attendance: 4,000
Referee: Lasha Silagava

Samtredia won 4–2 on aggregate and qualified for 2017–18 Champions League second qualifying round; Chikhura Sachkhere qualified for 2017–18 Europa League first qualifying round.

== Top goalscorers ==
Rank	Goalscorer	Team	Goals
1	(Georgia (country)) Budu Zivzivadze	Samtredia	11
2	(Georgia (country)) Saba Lobzhanidze	Chikhura Sachkhere	8
3	(Georgia (country)) Jaba Dvali	FC Tskhinvali	7
4	(Georgia (country)) Bachana Arabuli	Samtredia	6
4	(Georgia (country)) Davit Volkovi	Sioni Bolnisi	6
6	(Georgia (country)) Gega Diasamidze	Locomotive Tbilisi	5
6	(Georgia (country)) Giorgi Kharaishvili	Saburtalo Tbilisi	5
6	(Georgia (country)) Elguja Lobjanidze	Dinamo Batumi	5
6	(Georgia (country)) Oleg Mamasakhlisi	Torpedo Kutaisi	5
6	(Georgia (country)) Temuri Shonia	Dinamo Batumi	5

Source: soccerway.com
