= Kissa =

Coordinates: 41°23′12″N 41°25′29″E

Kissa was a town of ancient Pontus on the Black Sea coast, on the road from Trapezus to Apsarus.

Its site is located near Hopa (Kise) in Asiatic Turkey.
