= Province of Trabzon =

Province of Trabzon or Province of Trebizond may refer to:

- Province of Trabzon, one of the provinces of the Republic of Turkey
- Eyalet of Trebizond, one of the eyalet of the Ottoman Empire
- Vilayet of Trebizond, one of the vilayet of the Ottoman Empire
