= FC Gonio =

Georgian association football club

Football Club Gonio
- Founded: April 2021; 5 years ago
- Ground: Central Stadium; Gonio, Batumi, Georgia
- Chairman: Davit Dolidze
- Coach: Bruno Fernandes (caretaker)
- League: Liga 3
- 2025: 9th of 10 in Liga 2 (relegated)

FC Gonio (Georgian: საფეხბურთო კლუბი გონიო) is a Georgian association football club based in Gonio, the southern settlement of Batumi.

They started taking part in the national league in 2021. Starting from 2022, Gonio achieved three successive promotions. Following the 2025 season, the team was relegated to Liga 3.

== History ==
The club was established in April 2021 and included in the Regionuli Liga West Group tournament for the upcoming season. After two initial wins under manager Giorgi Zoidze, Gonio afterwards stayed in midtable. In early July, before the season resumed, a new head coach was appointed. During this season, the team recorded six victories with a large margin, including 8–0 in October.

The next year Gonio made their debut in the David Kipiani Cup where they beat two opponents, including a third-tier team. Gonio were involved in the promotion chase along with two other clubs throughout the league season. They eventually came second in the table and qualified for the play-offs. In a crucial game held in Batumi, Gonio cruised to victory over Gldani and secured promotion to the fourth division.

Before the start of their new league campaign, Gonio signed several players with even a top-tier experience and unveiled their ambitious plan to advance further into the third division. An initial five-game winning run in Liga 4 indicated that they were serious title contenders. On 28 June 2023, Gonio recorded the biggest win in their history (14–1). Together with Betlemi, in September they became the co-authors of a unique occasion in Georgian football when a club gained promotion with seven matches still to play. Gonio continued an unbeaten streak during the remaining period and won the champion's title.

With new coach Levan Jokhadze at the helm, the team surged forward in the Liga 3 title race as well. They were ten points clear at the top with three matches in hand when a 5–0 rout of Gardabani on 14 November 2024 ensured another league title and automatic promotion to the 2nd tier. Although a year later, Gonio failed to retain a place there and returned to Liga 3.

== Seasons ==
Year	Tier	Pos	M	W	D	L	GF–GA	Pts	Domestic Cup
2021	5th (Note: Group C)	5th of 9	24	13	2	9	51–34	41	–
2022	5th	2nd of 11↑	20	16	0	4	87–16	48	3rd round
2023	4th	1st of 14↑	26	21	4	1	75–15	67	3rd round
2024	3rd	1st of 16↑	30	20	4	6	81–36	64	3rd round
2025	2nd	9th of 10↓	30	9	10	17	42–57	37	3rd round
2026	3rd								3rd round

== Squad ==
As of 20 March 2026

Note: Flags indicate national team as defined under FIFA eligibility rules; some limited exceptions apply. Players may hold more than one non-FIFA nationality.

No.	Pos.	Nation	Player
1	GK	GEO	Aleksandre Dadeshkeliani
2	DF	IRL	Sylas Boni
3	DF	GEO	Irakli Komakhidze
4	DF	GEO	Davit Mosidze
6	MF	GEO	Oleg Mamasakhlisi
7	MF	GEO	Erekle Jijavadze (C)
8	MF	GEO	Ivane Khabelashvili
9	FW	GEO	Tato Abuselidze
10	FW	GEO	Gia Apkhazava
11	FW	BRA	Vinicius Belotti
12	FW	GEO	Levan Ingorokva

No.	Pos.	Nation	Player
13	MF	GEO	Giorgi Tsetskhladze
16	DF	GEO	Jaba Kasrelishvili
17	FW	GEO	Koba Keburia
19	DF	GEO	Tornike Tamazashvili
20	MF	BRA	Igor Dutra
22	DF	GEO	Mikheil Tsetskhladze
23	MF	GEO	Giorgi Rekhviashvili
24	MF	GEO	Avtandil Ebralidze
25	GK	GEO	Robert Imerlishvili
26	MF	GEO	Irakli Chiabrishvili
31	DF	GEO	Gaga Gazdeliani

== Managers ==
Name	Nat.	From	To
Giorgi Zoidze	(Georgia (country))	April 2021	July 2021
Irakli Gogichaishvili	(Georgia (country))	July 2021	December 2022
Amiran Gogitidze	(Georgia (country))	January 2023	July 2023
Nika Sabanadze	(Georgia (country))	July 2023	December 2023
Levan Jokhadze	(Georgia (country))	January 2024	June 2025
Revaz Gotsiridze	(Georgia (country))	June 2025	September 2025
Levan Jokhadze (2)	(Georgia (country))	October 2025	December 2025
Gela Davitadze	(Georgia (country))	January 2026	April 2026
Avtandil Kunchulia (interim)	(Georgia (country))	April 2026	May 2026
Revaz Gotsiridze (2)	(Georgia (country))	May 2026	August 2026
Bruno Fernandes (caretaker)	(Portugal)	September 2026	

== Honours ==
Liga 3

- Champions (1): 2024

Liga 4

- Champions (1): 2023

Regionuli Liga

- Runners-up (1): 2022, Group C

== Stadium ==
The team uses the 1,500-seater Angisa football ground situated in Batumi as their temporary home stadium, although hosts some of the league games at Kobuleti Football Centre.

== Name ==
The town of Gonio is located at a historic place famous for its Roman-era fortress.
