= Ottoman invasion of Guria =

Ottoman invasion of Guria may refer to:

- Ottoman invasion of Guria (1547)
- Ottoman invasion of Imereti and Guria (1509)
- Ottoman invasion of western Georgia (1703)
