= Irakli Komakhidze =

Georgian association football player

Personal information
- Date of birth: 26 March 1997 (age 29)
- Place of birth: Kobuleti, Georgia
- Height: 1.70 m (5 ft 7 in)
- Position: Defender

Team information
- Current team: Gonio
- Number: 3

Youth career
- Shukura

Senior career*
Years	Team	Apps	(Gls)
2013–2016	Shukura	47	(3)
2017–2019	Locomotive	58	(0)
2020–2022	Shukura	65	(3)
2023–2024	Iberia 1999	42	(1)
2024–	Gonio	27	(0)

International career^{‡}
2013–2014	Georgia U17	5	(0)
2015–2016	Georgia U19	6	(0)
- * Club domestic league appearances and goals as of 13 June 2025 ‡ National team caps and goals as of 6 April 2025

Irakli Komakhidze (Georgian: ირაკლი კომახიძე, born 26 March 1997) is a Georgian footballer who plays as an left back for Erovnuli Liga 2 club Gonio.

Komakhidze has spent most of his career at his hometown club Shukura. Being the winner of the Georgian Cup with Iberia 1999, he was a member of national youth teams.

== Career ==
=== Club ===
Irakli Komakhidze started his career at Shukura in 2013. In his initial season, Komakhidze played for both the senior and reserve teams respectively in the 2nd and 3rd divisions. On 30 April 2014, he gave Shukura the lead in a 5–1 win over Skuri, bagging his first goal in an official match. As Shukura sealed promotion to the Umaglesi Liga the next month, Komakhidze made his top-tier appearance on 24 August 2014 against Chikhura.

After three seasons at Shukura, Komakhidze moved to Locomotive. In 2019, he came close to winning his first national trophy. Komakhidze took part in all four games of the cup campaign and played the final in full, but Locomotive failed to beat Saburtalo.

Komakhidze returned to Shukura in 2020 for another three-year period. As his team gained their fourth promotion to the top division this season, Komakhidze was named in Team of the Year by the Lelo sport newspaper. The next year, with Shukura back in the Erovnuli Liga, he wore the team armband.

In January 2023, Saburtalo announced the signing of Komakhidze. The same year, they won the cup competition with Komakhidze taking part in four games.

On 28 June 2024, Liga 3 club Gonio confirmed that they signed the Georgian Cup holder, calling it the most successful transfer in their history. At the end of the season, they secured the third successive promotion and progressed to the 2nd division.

=== International ===
Komakhidze was first called up to the national U14 team in 2011 for an international tournament held in Sweden. Two years later, he joined U17s for 2014 UEFA European Championship qualifiers. He also took part in all six games of U19s both in the first and elite rounds of 2016 UEFA European Under-19 Championship qualification.

When Gia Geguchadze took over the national U21 team in 2016, Komakhidze was also regarded as a candidate, although he did not feature in official games.

== Statistics ==
As of match played 6 December 2025

Appearances and goals by club, season and competition
Club	Season	League			National cup		Continental		Other		Total	
Club	Season	Division	Apps	Goals	Apps	Goals	Apps	Goals	Apps	Goals	Apps	Goals
Shukura II	2013–14	Meore Liga	11	0	–		–		–		11	0
Shukura	2013–14	Pirveli Liga	7	1	2	0	–		–		9	1
Shukura	2014–15	Umaglesi Liga	10	0	4	0	–		–		14	0
Shukura	2015–16	Umaglesi Liga	17	0	4	0	–		–		21	0
Shukura	2016	Umaglesi Liga	13	2	–		–		–		13	2
Locomotive	2017	Erovnuli Liga	13	0	–		–		–		13	0
Locomotive	2018	Erovnuli Liga	17	0	1	0	–		–		18	0
Locomotive	2019	Erovnuli Liga	28	0	4	0	–		–		32	0
Locomotive	Total		58	0	5	0	0	0	0	0	63	0
Shukura	2020	Erovnuli Liga 2	17	2	1	0	–		–		18	2
Shukura	2021	Erovnuli Liga	19	1	2	0	–		2 (Note: Appearances in Erovnuli Liga playoffs)	0	23	0
Shukura	2022	Erovnuli Liga 2	29	3	3	0	–		–		32	3
Shukura	Total		112	9	16	0	0	0	2	0	130	9
Saburtalo	2023	Erovnuli Liga	25	0	4	0	–		–		29	0
Saburtalo	2024	Erovnuli Liga	17	1	–		–		–		17	1
Saburtalo	Total		42	1	4	0	0	0	0	0	46	1
Gonio	2024	Liga 3	12	0	1	0	–		–		13	0
Gonio	2025	Erovnuli Liga 2	24	0	0	0	–		–		24	0
Gonio	Total		36	0	1	0	0	0	0	0	37	0
Career total			259	7	26	0	0	0	2	0	287	7

== Honours ==
Shukura

- Erovnuli Liga 2: 2022

Saburtalo

- Georgian Cup: 2023

Gonio

- Liga 3: 2024
