= Cihanoğlu family =

Turkish family from the 18th century

The Cihanoğlu family is a Turkish family that established dominance around Aydın in the 18th century, when the central government weakened and regional feudal lordships came to the fore in the Ottoman Empire. The name translates as "son of Cihan".

== History ==
The Cihanoğlu were a powerful and wealthy derebey family that dominated the Aydın Güzelhisarı and Koçarlı regions in the 18th and 19th centuries.

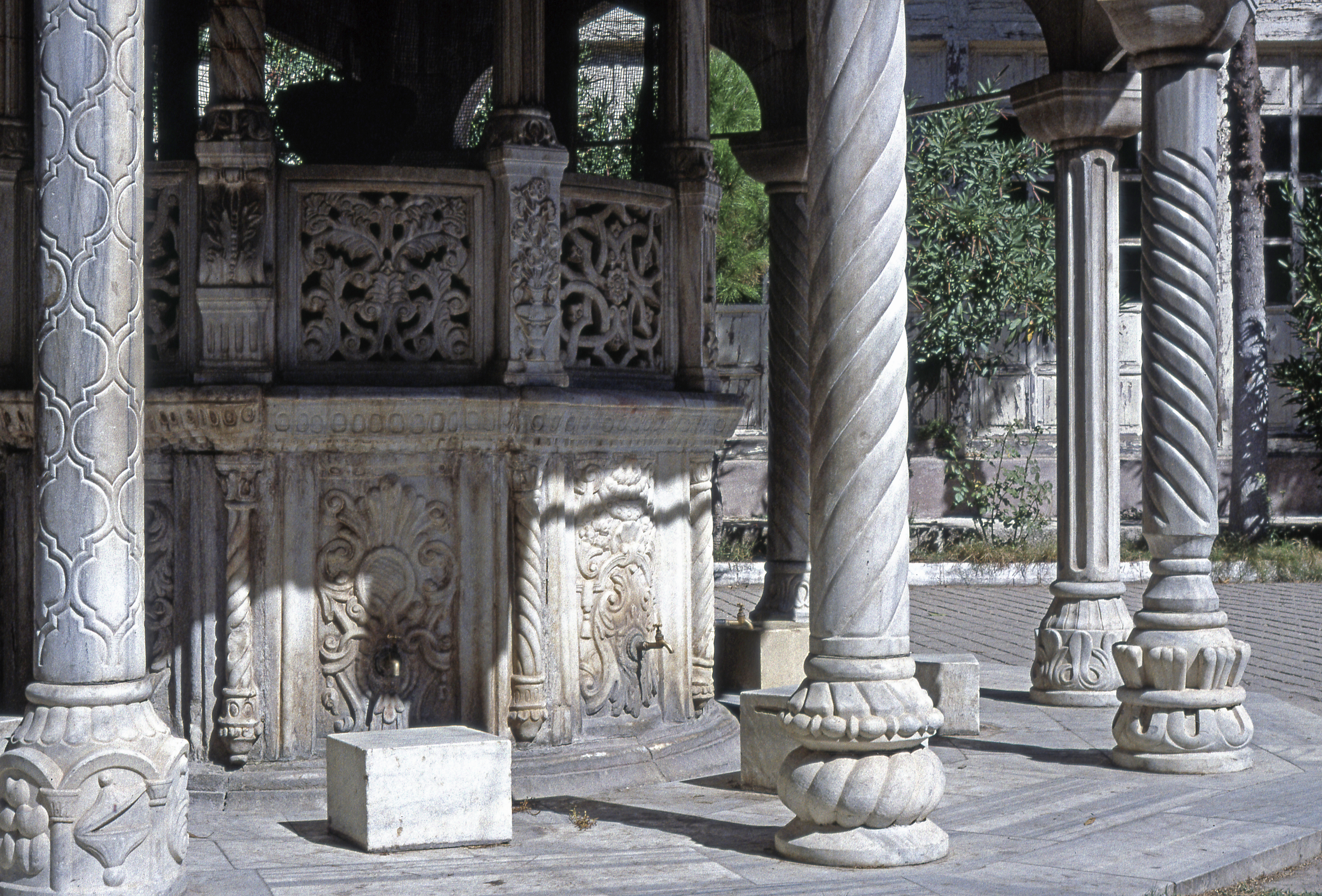
Fountain of Cihanoğlu Mosque

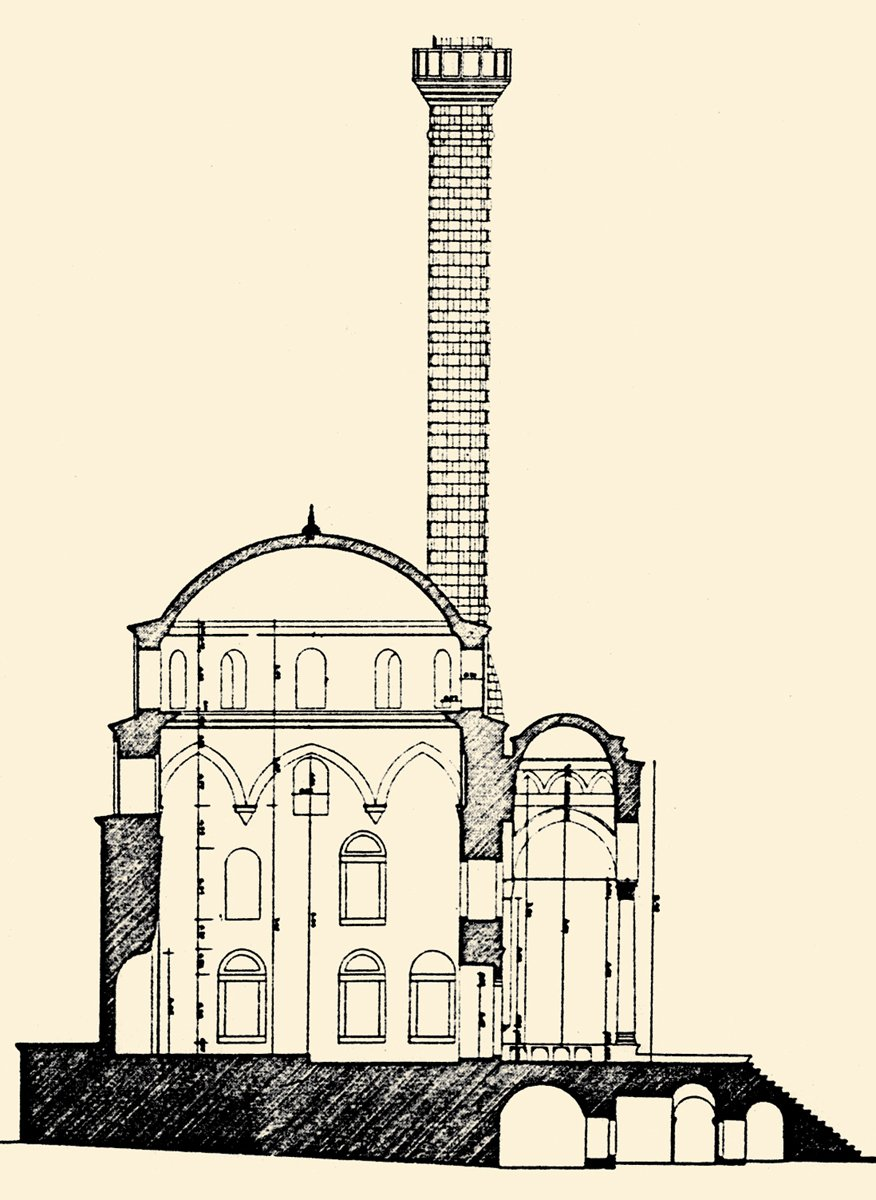
Cross section of Cihanoğlu Mosque

The family traces its origin to Mehmet Bey. Returning from the siege of Rhodes, Suleiman the Magnificent passed with his army through this area, which was inhabited by a Turkish tribe numbering about 250 people. They were hospital to Suleiman and he allowed them to build a fortification there. Mehmet Bey, a member of the local tribe who had fought with Suleiman, produced a son, who was named Cihan, the founder of the family of the Cihanoğlu (i.e. "the sons of Cihan).

The family made important contributions to the Ottoman architectural landscape. An important feature that draws attention as a hallmark in the family's 18th century works is that they pioneered Turkish baroque architecture. Indeed, the baroque style, which would become a part of the architectural landscape with the works of the Balyan family in Istanbul only 70–80 years later, in the mid- 19th century, was applied in Aydın by the Cihanoğlu long before. They are credited with the introduction in Anatolia of the new Ottoman taste of art (infused with Western influences, especially from Baroque and Rococo).

They built the Tower of Koçarlι in Koçarlι in the early 1760s, one of three towers of the Aydın Province. They did so to protect their interests in the area. They built Cincin Castle (built by Abdul Aziz Cihanoğlu in the 18th century), in Turkish Cincin Kalesi, in the village of the same name. They built the Cihanoğlu Mosque. The structure, called Cihanoğlu Complex, consists of the mosque, a madrasa, a tomb-sabil and a fountain. It was built in 1756–57, and is considered one of the brightest examples of Ottoman baroque.

They commissioned two mosques in Cincin. One has a mihrab closely resembling Guarino Guarini's Altar of San Lorenzo. One of the mosques they built has a mihrab encircled by spiral columns in Bernini's style.
