= Three Hundred Laz Martyrs =

Saints of the Georgian Orthodox Church

- Died: 1600-1620; Lazistan
- Venerated in: Georgian Orthodox Church
- Feast: 29 April (12 May)

The Three Hundred Laz Martyrs (Georgian: სამასი ლაზი მოწამე, romanized: samasi lazi mots'ame, Laz: სუმოში ლაზი თისჲაფე, sumoşi lazi tisyape), also known as Holy Martyrs of Lazeti, are saints of the Georgian Orthodox Church, who were put to death for not renouncing Christianity by the Ottoman Empire between the years 1600 and 1620. The Georgian church commemorates them on 18 September (O.S. 10 October).

== Source ==
- Zakaria Machitadze (2006). "Lives of the Georgian Saints". St. Herman Press, P.O. Box 70, Platina, CA 96076
