= FC Betlemi Keda =

Betlemi Keda
- Full name: FC Betlemi Keda
- Founded: 1950; 76 years ago
- Ground: Archil Partenadze Stadium, Keda
- Capacity: 1,000
- Owner: Tekto Group
- Chairman: Tornike Apkhazava
- Manager: Nikoloz Todadze
- League: Liga 3
- 2025: 10th of 16 in Liga 3
Home colours	Away colours

FC Betlemi (Georgian: საფეხბურთო კლუბი ბეთლემი) is a Georgian football club based in the town of Keda, Adjara.

The history of Betlemi goes back to the Soviet times. Since the club's revival in 2010, they have drifted between the second and forth tiers. Following a highly successful 2023 season, they won promotion to Liga 3.

The club plays home matches at the local central stadium named after late captain Archil Partenadze in 2015.

== History ==
Formed in 1950, Betlemi competed in regional competitions of the Georgian Soviet league. The club showed their best result in the cup during the first season in 1990 when they reached the 5th round. In the mid-1990s the team was dissolved for more than a decade.

In the 2011–12 season, Betlemi under manager Edisher Kakabadze gained promotion to Pirveli Liga for the first time, where they spent four successive seasons. In April 2015, the whole Georgian football world was shocked to hear about sudden death of team's captain Archil Partenadze during the training session.

The next season turned out crucial. Despite an encouraging start and reaching the promotion area at the winter break, a wretched run of form later led to the manager's exit. The team was soon embroiled in a match-fixing scandal and subjected to severe punishment. While a life-long ban on football activity was meted out to five individuals, including four players, Betlemi were expelled from the league. Following this decision and a major purge, the management as well as eighteen players were replaced.

Betlemi managed to successfully recover from the crisis and complete the 2016 season on top of the table, but as none of the league winners were promoted this year, the club remained in the third division. In 2019, five bottom teams were involved in a fierce relegation battle up until the last round. Eventually, after one victory in last eight games, Betlemi hit rock bottom.

The team was among the top five in the initial three seasons in Liga 4. In 2021 and 2022, Betlemi participated in the promotion battle, although in both cases they finished just one place below the qualifying slot.

By the summer of 2023, the team had produced a 24-game unbeaten streak in both competitions stretching from the previous September. In a record-breaking achievement for all four national division clubs this season, Amiran Mujiri's men secured fourteen wins in as many matches, including twelve of them with a large margin, and reached an astonishing 60:2 goal difference. In late September, with eighteen wins in 19 games now, Betlemi notched up an unprecedented success for Georgian football history: along with fellow Adjarian club Gonio, they sealed promotion two months before the end of the season with seven games still in hand.

In early June 2023, striker Amiran "Tato" Abuselidze became the first player who netted his 100th goal for Betlemi. Eventually, with 28 goals he became the top goalscorer of this season.

In November 2023, the club as a municipal entity was handed over to the Tekto Group Real Estate Construction and Development company for a 29-year-long period.

== Seasons ==
Year	League	Pos	Pld	W	D	L	GF–GA	Pts	Notes
2012/13	Pirveli Liga, Group A	10_{/12}	33	10	5	18	40-76	35	
2013/14	Pirveli Liga, Group B	11_{/14}	26	7	3	16	28-50	24	
2014/15	Pirveli Liga, Group B	4_{/10}	36	14	7	15	51-50	49	
2015/16	Pirveli Liga	14_{/18}	34	12	4	18	41-65	40	Expelled
2016	Liga 3	1_{/8}	14	11	1	2	45-15	34	
2017	Liga 3, Red Group	4_{/10}	18	7	7	4	34-20	28	
2017	Promotion Group	8_{/10}	18	4	4	10	23-44	16	
2018	Liga 3	10_{/20}	38	14	9	15	52-58	51	
2019	Liga 3	10_{/10}	36	10	8	18	40-62	38	Relegated
2020	Liga 4, White Group	5_{/8}	14	4	4	6	20-28	16	
2021	Liga 4, White Group	3_{/10}	18	10	2	6	32-17	32	
2021	Promotion Group	5_{/10}	18	8	2	8	23-23	26	
2022	Liga 4	4_{/16}	30	20	3	7	60-29	63	
2023	Liga 4	2_{/14}	26	21	2	3	99-16	65	Promoted
2024	Liga 3	8_{/16}	30	12	5	13	49–61	41	
2025	Liga 3	10_{/16}	30	7	8	15	43–71	29	

== Current squad ==
As of 20 March 2026

Note: Flags indicate national team as defined under FIFA eligibility rules; some limited exceptions apply. Players may hold more than one non-FIFA nationality.

No.	Pos.	Nation	Player
1	GK	GEO	Roman Takidze
4	DF	GEO	Sulkhan Kakhidze (C)
5	DF	GEO	Saba Shvelidze
7	MF	GEO	Dato Nakashidze
8	MF	GEO	Beka Khimshiashvili
9	FW	GEO	Avto Endeladze
10	MF	GEO	Nika Kvantaliani
11	MF	GEO	Giorgi Kakhiani
13	DF	GEO	Aleksandre Suladze

No.	Pos.	Nation	Player
17	MF	GEO	Saba Ashba
19	DF	GEO	Luka Chrelashvili
21	DF	GEO	Giorgi Andguladze
22	MF	GEO	Aleksandre Gugushvili
23	DF	GEO	Giga Darchidze
27	FW	GEO	Amiko Kutubidze
30	GK	GEO	Teimuraz Lomadze
37	DF	GEO	Jemal Verulidze

== Honours ==
Meore Liga

- Winners: 2016 (West B)

Liga 4

- Runners-up: 2023

== Managers ==
Name	From	To
(Georgia (country)) Avtandil Kunchulia	2016	2016
(Georgia (country)) Amiran Gogitidze	2016	2017
(Georgia (country)) Irakli Gogichaishvili	2018	2018
(Georgia (country)) Avtandil Kunchulia	2018	2019
(Georgia (country)) Irakli Gogichaishvili	2020	2020
(Georgia (country)) Amiran Gogitidze	2021	2022
(Georgia (country)) Amiran Mujiri	2023	2024
(Georgia (country)) Vako Tevdoradze	2024	2024
(Georgia (country)) Nika Diasamidze	2024	2024
(Georgia (country)) Eldar Kupradze	2024	2024
(Georgia (country)) Nikoloz Todadze	2025	

== Stadium ==
Betlemi's home ground is a 1,000-seat stadium in Keda, named after Archil Partenadze. Some reconstruction works were launched there in August 2020.

== Name ==
Betlemi is a Georgian word for biblical Bethlehem.
