= FC Margveti 2006 =

- Full name: FC Margveti 2006 Zestaponi
- Nickname: Margvelebi
- Founded: 2006
- Ground: David Abashidze Stadium, Zestaponi
- Chairman: Guram Kakoishvili
- Manager: Ilia Mgebrishvili
- League: Liga 3
- 2025: 12th of 16
- Website: margveti.ge

FC Margveti 2006 (Georgian: საფეხბურთო კლუბი მარგვეთი 2006), commonly referred to as Margveti, is a Georgian association football club from Zestaponi. It competes in Liga 3, the third division of Georgian football.

== History ==
=== Clubs of Zestaponi ===
Since 1990, when independent leagues were formed, the city of Zestaponi has been represented by several clubs in Georgian football divisions.

● FC Margveti spent eight seasons in Umaglesi Liga in the 1990s, twice reaching semifinals of the national cup and once finishing the second, which paved the way for participation in UEFA Cup preliminary round. However, facing a severe financial crisis, the club went bust in 2000.

● FC Metalurgi (Georgian: მეტალურგი), bearing the name of a Soviet-time football club from Zestaponi, re-emerged instead. Being participant of two top-flight seasons between 2001 and 2003, they, too, ceased to exist for the same reason.

● FC Zestaponi, founded in 2004, achieved a remarkable success in the late 2000s and early 2010s, becoming a dominant force along with Dinamo Tbilisi. The two-time champions and the cup title holders, however, due to various reasons faded away gradually after 2014.

=== Margveti 2006 ===
Margveti 2006 were formed in 2006 as a municipal club on the basis of a local football school, where at one point 268 pupils were engaged in football, participating in different regional and republican competitions. As for the professional club, they have taken part in the third division and below only.

Margveti came close to gaining promotion to Pirveli Liga three times in four years in the middle of the decade. In 2016, they won the Group tournament, although no club was promoted in this season.

In contrast with the previous seasons, in 2017 the club was involved in the relegation round. Although Margveti seemed clear favorites in a play-off tie, they surprisingly lost it, which led to the exit of manager Gia Guruli and 13 field players. The team was a member of Regionuli Liga for the next three years before they managed to take the second place in 2020 in Group A West and advance to Liga 4.

It took the club four years to achieve another promotion. Having been among the top three teams throughout the 2024 season, Margveti under head coach Tamaz Gabrichidze sealed their return to the third tier after a seven-year absence. This year turned out especially unforgettable for forward Jumber (Juba) Khmelidze, who by mid-October had scored 39 out of Margveti's 79 goals. His tally included two hat-tricks, four pokers and even seven goals that he netted in a single match.

== Seasons ==
Season	League	Pos	MP	W	D	L	GF–GA	P	Notes
2012/13	Meore Liga West	5th of 13	24	14	1	9	70–37	43	
2013/14	Meore Liga West	2nd of 13	24	15	6	3	52–21	51	
2014/15	Meore Liga West	7th of 15	28	14	2	12	54–46	44	
2015/16	Meore Liga West	2nd of 14	26	22	0	4	80–23	66	
2016	Meore Liga A Group West	1st of 7	12	8	4	0	28–5	28	
2017	Liga 3 Red Group	7th of 10	18	5	6	7	21–28	21	
2017	Relegation round	5th of 10	18	8	5	5	27–17	29	Play-off, relegated (Note: Lost 2–1 to Samgurali-2)
2018	Regionuli Liga, A West	2nd of 8	14	11	1	2	45–15	34	
2018	Promotion Group, West	5th of 8	14	6	2	6	26–37	20	
2019	Regionuli Liga, A West	5th of 10	9	4	1	4	14–21	13	
2019	Promotion Group, West	10th of 10	18	0	0	18	9–85	0	
2020	Regionuli Liga, A West	2nd of 9	16	9	4	3	45–31	31	Promoted
2021	Liga 4, Red Group	4th of 10	18	8	5	5	36–33	29	
2021	Promotion Group	10th of 10	18	2	3	13	18–51	9	
2022	Liga 4	9th of 16	30	10	9	11	59–68	39	
2023	Liga 4	5th of 14	26	15	3	8	55–40	48	
2024	Liga 4	2nd of 15	26	20	2	6	96–46	62	Promoted
2025	Liga 3	12th of 16	30	7	7	16	36–71	28	

== Honours ==
Meore Liga

- Winners (1): 2016 (Group A West)
- Runners-up (2): 2013–14, 2015–16 (West)

Liga 4

- Runners-up (1): 2024

== Players ==
As of 20 March 2026

Note: Flags indicate national team as defined under FIFA eligibility rules; some limited exceptions apply. Players may hold more than one non-FIFA nationality.

No.	Pos.	Nation	Player
1	GK	GEO	Giorgi Abramishvili (C)
2	DF	GEO	Tornike Churadze
3	DF	GEO	Lasha Khachapuridze
5	DF	GEO	Shota Vardosanidze
6	MF	GEO	Vazha Shanidze
7	FW	GEO	Vano Chargeishvili
8	MF	GEO	Giorgi Samkharadze
9	MF	GEO	Dimitri Margvelashvili
11	FW	GEO	Avtandil Mamporia

No.	Pos.	Nation	Player
14	MF	GEO	Beka Kakushadze
15	DF	GEO	Tornike Darsavelidze
16	MF	GEO	Slava Papava
17	DF	GEO	Giorgi Kheladze
19	DF	GEO	Andria Shavgulidze
20	MF	GEO	Dato Bebiashvili
21	FW	GEO	Nodar Gachechiladze
22	DF	GEO	Emir Vardosanidze
23	DF	GEO	Saba Baghdavadze
33	GK	GEO	Anzor Peradze

== Stadium ==
Due to unavailability of a football ground in the city, the club was using a pitch in the town of Kharagauli, situated in 22 km from Zestaponi, for their official matches in the early 2020s. The construction of a municipal stadium, which was repeatedly announced, is yet to commence.

Margveti 2006 returned to their hometown in 2026.

== City derby ==
Relations with FC Zestaponi can hardly be described as easy. In 2015, a media row erupted after Ilia Kokaia, the owner of the latter, slammed Margveti 2006 for cronyism and unfair privileges, and suggested that the local authorities were deliberately seeking to sink FC Zestaponi at the expense of this municipal club. Margveti hit out at him by dismissing all the allegations.

During the 2018, 2019 and 2021 seasons these two clubs played in the same division. Initially Margveti won two games (1–0 and 2–0), but then lost next seven matches in a row with a 4–35 aggregate goal difference.

== Name ==
Margveti, also mentioned as Argveti in historic annals, was a duchy between VIII and XI centuries on large swaths of the current Imereti region.
