= Oleg Mamasakhlisi =

Georgian footballer

Personal information
- Date of birth: 25 November 1995 (age 30)
- Height: 1.81 m (5 ft 11 1/2 in)
- Position: Defender

Team information
- Current team: Gonio
- Number: 6

Senior career*
Years	Team	Apps	(Gls)
2013–2018	Torpedo Kutaisi	91	(10)
2018–19	Samtredia	12	(3)
2019–20	Chikhura	27	(1)
2020–2021	Torpedo Kutaisi	39	(4)
2022	Shukura	25	(4)
2023	Saburtalo	8	(0)
2024–	Gonio	19	(3)

International career
2017–	Georgia	2	(0)
- * Club domestic league appearances and goals as of 13 June 2025

Oleg Mamasakhlisi (Georgian: ოლეგ მამასახლისი; born 25 November 1995) is a Georgian football player. He plays for Erovnuli Liga 2 club Gonio as a defender.

Mamasakhlisi is the Erovnuli Liga winner with Torpedo. He has also won the national cup and Super cup.

== Club career ==
He made his Georgia national football team debut on 23 January 2017 in a friendly game against Uzbekistan.

After his contract with Torpedo Kutaisi expired, in early 2022 Mamasakhlisi joined Shukura Kobuleti.

A year later, Mamasakhlisi moved to Saburtalo and won the national cup with them.

In 2024, he signed with Liga 3 club Gonio and helped them earn promotion to the 2nd division in the same season.

== Honours ==
Torpedo

- Georgian Cup: 2016
- Erovnuli Liga: 2017
- Super Cup: 2018

Shukura

- Erovnuli Liga 2: 2022

Saburtalo

- Georgian Cup: 2023

Gonio

- Liga 3: 2024
