= Nika Kvantaliani =

Georgian footballer

Personal information
- Full name: Nika Kvantaliani
- Date of birth: 6 February 1998 (age 28)
- Place of birth: Batumi, Georgia
- Height: 1.65 m (5 ft 5 in)
- Position: Winger

Team information
- Current team: Betlemi
- Number: 10

Youth career
- –2013: Dinamo Batumi
- 2013–2015: Atlético Madrid

Senior career*
Years	Team	Apps	(Gls)
2015–2018	Dinamo Batumi	44	(5)
2018	Termalica Nieciecza	1	(0)
2018	Widzew Łódź	3	(0)
2019	Shukura Kobuleti	7	(0)
2021–2022	Kolkheti 1913		
2022	Shevardeni 1906	4	(0)
2023–2024	Matchakhela		
2024–	Betlemi		

International career
2017	Georgia U19	1	(0)
- * Club domestic league appearances and goals as of 28 March 2025

Nika Kvantaliani (Georgian: ნიკა კვანტალიანი; born 6 February 1998) is a Georgian professional footballer who plays as a winger for Liga 3 club Betlemi.

== Club career ==
He made his Ekstraklasa debut for Bruk-Bet Termalica Nieciecza on 19 February 2018 in a game against Górnik Zabrze. On 15 April 2019, he joined FC Shukura Kobuleti.
