= Ottoman invasion of Guria (1547) =

The Ottoman invasion of Guria
- Part of the Georgian–Ottoman wars
Date	1547
Location	Lazistan, Adjara
Result	Ottoman victory

Belligerents
Ottoman Empire	Principality of Guria

Commanders and leaders
Lala Mustafa Pasha	Rostom Gurieli

Strength
Unknown	Unknown

The Ottoman invasion of Guria was a remarkable event of the Ottoman Empire against the Principality of Guria, which resulted by occupation of the Chaneti (Lazistan) and Adjara; maritime settlements of Gonio and Batumi, in 1547.

== History ==
In 1547, the Ottoman military imposed a blockade of Guria's coastline and occupied the maritime settlements of Gonio and Batumi. Rostom Gurieli appealed for help to Bagrat III of Imereti and Levan I Dadiani, Prince of Mingrelia. Levan I Dadiani collected the Abkhazians and Odishians to help Guria; he camped in the Rioni harbor. However, the king of Imereti, indignant at Rostom's earlier decline of a combined attack on Mingrelia, disrupted the nascent Dadiani–Gurieli accord. Left to his own devices, Rostom attacked, pushed the Ottoman forces beyond the Chorokhi and forced them to evacuate Batumi, but he failed to prevent the loss of Adjara and Chaneti; the Gonio fortress became an important Ottoman outpost in southwestern Georgia.
