= Battle of Maltakva =

Battle

- Part of Russo-Turkish War (1806–1812)
| Date | 2 November 1809 |
| Location | Malkatva, Georgia |
| Result | Russo-Georgian victory |
| Territorial changes | Russians and Georgians capture Poti |

Belligerents
| Russian Empire; Principality of Guria; Principality of Mingrelia; Principality of Abkhazia | Ottoman Empire |

Commanders and leaders
| Unknown | Pasha of Poti; Serasker of Trebizond |

Strength
| Unknown | 9,000 |

Casualties and losses
| Unknown | Unknown |

The Battle of Maltakvi was part of the Russo-Turkish war (1806-1812), the battle of the Russo-Georgian army to capture Poti fortress.

The Russian command attached great importance to the liberation of Poti from the Ottomans and tried by all means to achieve it. After unsuccessful negotiations with the commandant of the Poti prison, the Russian command decided to take the prison by force. On August 12, the Russian army, together with the army of the principalities of Samegrelo and Abkhazia, moved towards Poti. One part of the army moved to the left side of Rioni river and stood about 3 km (1.9 mi) from the fortress. Part of it landed in the lower part of the river. Cannons should be placed on the right side of the river. On August 13, after the artillery fire, the Ottomans left the fortified place and rushed to the fortress. Their garrison was surrounded on 3 sides. Artillery fire inflicted significant losses on the enemy, but the attack was delayed due to the lack of war material. In the second half of October, Seraskir of Trebizond with 9,000 soldiers approached Poti to help the Turkish garrison. The Russian command managed to recruit Mamiya V Guriel to its side. The army of Guria principality under the command of Vakhtang Eristavi and Simon Gugunava suddenly attacked the enemy from Grigoleti and severely defeated them. The Ottomans tried to escape by sea. Many drowned in the water, some scattered in the forest and swamp. On November 2, the units of the Samegrelo and Abkhaz army marched towards the Maltakva river under the cover of artillery fire. The garrison of Poti was forced to leave the fortress, which was captured on November 15 by General Dimitri Orbeliani with Megrelian-Abkhaz detachments.
