= 2023 Liga 4 (Georgia) =

Football season in Georgia

Liga 4
- Season: 2023
- Dates: 6 April – 20 November
- Champions: Gonio
- Promoted: Gonio; Betlemi; Gardabani
- Relegated: Kolkheti-2; Dinamo Zugdidi
- Matches played: 182
- Goals scored: 681 (3.74 per match)
- Top goalscorer: Amiran Abuselidze (28 goals)
- Biggest home win: Gonio 14–1 Dinamo Zugdidi (28 June)
- Biggest away win: Dinamo Zugdidi 0–8 Betlemi (29 April); Dinamo Zugdidi 0–8 Gonio (7 November)
- Highest scoring: Gonio 14–1 Dinamo Zugdidi (28 June)
- Longest winning run: Betlemi (13 matches)
- Longest unbeaten run: Gonio (19)
- Longest winless run: Dinamo Zugdidi (14)
- Longest losing run: Dinamo Zugdidi (14)

The 2023 Liga 4 (Georgia) season was the 5th edition of fourth tier football in Georgia under its current title. It began on 5 April and ended on 20 November.

It was this year the only national division that no play-offs were held. The season consisted of 30 rounds with each team playing 26 matches. The top three teams gained promotion to Liga 3 while the two lowest-finishing teams were relegated to Regionuli Liga.

== Team changes ==
The following teams changed division after the previous season:

=== To Liga 4 ===
Relegated from Liga 3

Tbilisi City

Promoted from Regionuli Liga

Gardabani • Gonio • Kolkheti-2 1913 • Varketili Tbilisi-2

=== From Liga 4 ===
Promoted to Liga 3

Locomotive-2 Tbilisi • Shturmi • Matchakhela

Relegated to Regionuli Liga

Didube Tbilisi • Samegrelo • Magaroeli • Iberia Tbilisi

== Teams and locations ==
Location of Liga 4 football clubs in 2023

This season was supposed to start with sixteen participating teams, but Shevardeni 1906 were disqualified first, followed by Tbilisi City later on.

After the summer break fourteen teams continued to take part in the tournament with two of them previously being members of the first tier: Sulori Vani (1991, 1991–92) and Dinamo Zugdidi under different names between 1990 and 2017. Five more spots were occupied by reserve teams of higher league clubs.

| Club | Position last season | Location | Region |
|---|---|---|---|
| Algeti^{[a]} | 12th | Marneuli | Kvemo Kartli |
| Betlemi | 4th | Keda | Adjara |
| Dinamo Zugdidi | ^{[b]} | Zugdidi | Samegrelo-Z.Svaneti |
| Gardabani | 1st in Regionuli Liga B | Gardabani | Kvemo Kartli |
| Gonio | 2nd in Regionuli Liga C | Batumi | Adjara |
| Kolkheti-2 1913 | 1st in Regionuli Liga C | Poti | Samegrelo-Z.Svaneti |
| Margveti 2006 | 9th | Zestaponi | Imereti |
| Merani-2 | 10th | Martvili | Samegrelo-Z.Svaneti |
| Odishi | 11th | Zugdidi | Samegrelo-Z.Svaneti |
| Samgurali-2 | 8th | Tskaltubo | Imereti |
| Skuri | 5th | Tsalenjikha | Samegrelo-Z.Svaneti |
| Sulori | 7th | Vani | Imereti |
| Varketili-2 | 1st in Regionuli Liga A | Tbilisi | Tbilisi |
| WIT Georgia-2 | 6th | Tbilisi | Tbilisi |

^{a} Based in Tbilisi

^{b} Expelled from Liga 2 on match-fixing allegations in May 2022, denied membership of Liga 3 in early 2023.

== League table ==
| Pos | Team | Pld | W | D | L | GF | GA | GD | Pts | Promotion, qualification or relegation |
|---|---|---|---|---|---|---|---|---|---|---|
| 1 | Gonio (C, P) | 26 | 21 | 4 | 1 | 75 | 15 | +60 | 67 | Promotion to Liga 3 |
| 2 | Betlemi (P) | 26 | 21 | 2 | 3 | 99 | 16 | +83 | 65 | Promotion to Liga 3 |
| 3 | Gardabani (P) | 26 | 16 | 4 | 6 | 53 | 28 | +25 | 52 | Promotion to Liga 3 |
| 4 | Odishi | 26 | 14 | 7 | 5 | 44 | 32 | +12 | 49 | |
| 5 | Margveti 2006 | 26 | 15 | 3 | 8 | 55 | 40 | +15 | 48 | |
| 6 | Samgurali-2 | 26 | 10 | 3 | 13 | 51 | 49 | +2 | 33 | |
| 7 | Merani-2 | 26 | 9 | 6 | 11 | 38 | 37 | +1 | 33 | |
| 8 | Sulori | 26 | 9 | 5 | 12 | 26 | 39 | −13 | 32 | |
| 9 | Algeti | 26 | 10 | 4 | 12 | 48 | 74 | −26 | 34 | |
| 10 | WIT Georgia-2 | 26 | 8 | 5 | 13 | 51 | 51 | 0 | 29 | |
| 11 | Varketili-2 | 26 | 9 | 1 | 16 | 38 | 48 | −10 | 28 | |
| 12 | Skuri | 26 | 7 | 2 | 17 | 33 | 69 | −36 | 23 | |
| 13 | Kolkheti-2 (R) | 26 | 6 | 4 | 16 | 48 | 58 | −10 | 22 | Relegation to Regionuli Liga |
| 14 | Dinamo Zugdidi (R) | 26 | 1 | 2 | 23 | 22 | 125 | −103 | 5 | Relegation to Regionuli Liga |

Source: gff.ge
Rules for classification: 1) Points; 2) Head-to-head points; 3) Head-to-head goal difference; 4) Head-to-head goals scored; 5) Head-to-head away goals scored (only if two teams); 6) Goal difference; 7) Goals scored.
(C) Champions; (P) Promoted; (R) Relegated

Notes:

- Tbilisi City were suspended after the first half of the season with all their matches annulled.
- In late September, with seven games still to play Betlemi Keda and Gonio both secured promotion to Liga 3 for the 2024 season. They were joined by Gardabani after a win on the last matchday.

=== Results ===
| Home \ Away | ALG | BET | DIN | GAR | GON | KOL | MRG | MRN | ODS | SMG | SKR | SUL | VAR | WIT |
|---|---|---|---|---|---|---|---|---|---|---|---|---|---|---|
| Algeti | | 2–5 | 6–2 | 0–2 | 0–0 | 4–3 | 2–1 | 2–3 | 1–1 | 1–3 | 4–1 | 2–0 | 2–1 | 2–5 |
| Betlemi | 12–1 | | 6–1 | 1–2 | 0–2 | 3–0 | 5–0 | 5–0 | 2–3 | 5–0 | 8–0 | 5–0 | 3–0 | 3–0 |
| Dinamo Zugdidi | 3–1 | 0–8 | | 1–6 | 0–8 | 2–5 | 1–5 | 1–4 | 0–0 | 1–4 | 1–3 | 1–2 | 0–5 | 2–3 |
| Gardabani | 4–0 | 0–3 | 2–0 | | 2–1 | 2–0 | 2–1 | 2–2 | 1–1 | 4–2 | 5–1 | 0–1 | 4–0 | 2–1 |
| Gonio | 6–0 | 0–0 | 14–1 | 2–1 | | 4–0 | 2–0 | 1–0 | 2–0 | 2–0 | 4–2 | 2–0 | 2–1 | 2–1 |
| Kolkheti-2 | 2–3 | 1–2 | 11–1 | 0–2 | 2–5 | | 0–1 | 3–2 | 1–1 | 1–1 | 7–0 | 0–2 | 1–1 | 0–3 |
| Margveti 2006 | 4–2 | 2–2 | 7–2 | 3–0 | 0–0 | 2–1 | | 1–6 | 2–3 | 6–2 | 5–2 | 1–0 | 3–0 | 1–1 |
| Merani-2 | 1–1 | 0–1 | 1–1 | 1–2 | 0–1 | 1–0 | 0–1 | | 5–1 | 1–0 | 0–1 | 0–0 | 2–0 | 4–2 |
| Odishi | 4–0 | 0–5 | 4–0 | 2–2 | 0–3 | 4–1 | 0–1 | 2–0 | | 1–0 | 3–1 | 2–2 | 1–0 | 3–1 |
| Samgurali-2 | 4–5 | 0–4 | 5–0 | 2–1 | 1–2 | 1–1 | 3–4 | 1–2 | 0–1 | | 5–0 | 3–0 | 4–1 | 3–1 |
| Skuri | 5–0 | 0–4 | 4–0 | 0–1 | 0–2 | 0–5 | 1–0 | 1–1 | 0–0 | 3–1 | | 0–1 | 0–2 | 2–3 |
| Sulori | 1–1 | 1–3 | 3–1 | 0–2 | 0–3 | 1–2 | 1–0 | 2–2 | 0–2 | 1–2 | 3–2 | | 2–0 | 1–1 |
| Varketili-2 | 1–4 | 0–2 | 4–0 | 1–0 | 1–2 | 4–0 | 1–2 | 3–0 | 1–3 | 0–3 | 1–3 | 2–0 | | 5–3 |
| WIT Georgia-2 | 0–2 | 1–2 | 4–0 | 2–2 | 3–3 | 6–1 | 1–2 | 2–0 | 1–2 | 1–1 | 3–1 | 0–2 | 2–3 | |

Source: Liga 4 results
Legend: Blue = home team win; Yellow = draw; Red = away team win.

== Top scorers ==
| Rank | Player | Club | Goals |
|---|---|---|---|
| 1 | (Georgia (country)) Amiran Abuselidze | Betlemi | 28 |
| 2 | (Georgia (country)) Levan Ingorokva | Gonio | 22 |
| 3 | (Georgia (country)) Davit Krasovski | Kolkheti-2 | 21 |
