= 2024 Liga 3 (Georgia) =

Football season in Georgia

Liga 3
- Season: 2024
- Dates: 7 March – 7 December
- Champions: Gonio (1st title)
- Promoted: Gonio; Meshakhte; Merani M Iberia-2 1999
- Relegated: Zestaponi; Machakhela; Guria
- Matches: 240
- Goals: 721 (3 per match)
- Top goalscorer: Kakhabrishvili (Gonio) (23 goals)
- Biggest home win: Meshakhte 7–0 Guria (7 November)
- Biggest away win: Machakhela 0–10 Gori (21 November)
- Highest scoring: Merani Tbilisi 9–4 Betlemi (7 December)
- Longest winning run: Iberia-2 1999 (6 matches)
- Longest unbeaten run: Gonio (11)
- Longest winless run: Machakhela (14)
- Longest losing run: Guria (10)
- All statistics correct as of complete.

The 2024 Liga 3 season was the 8th edition under its current title and the 36th edition of third tier football in Georgia. The regular two-round tournament commenced on 7 March and ended on 7 December with two-legged promotion play-offs completed on 16 December. Each team played thirty matches in as many rounds.

There were sixteen teams competing in the league this season. Five of them, namely Borjomi, Guria, Merani Martvili, Merani Tbilisi and Zestaponi had participated in the top tier with the latter being the two-time national champions.

Gori had the longest tenure in the league with the 8th consecutive season while Meshakhte and Bakhmaro entered into the seventh year. On the other hand, Gonio were the only team to have made their debut in Liga 3.

== Team changes ==
The following teams have changed division since the previous season:

=== To Liga 3 ===
Promoted from Liga 4

Gonio • Betlemi • Gardabani

Relegated from Liga 2

Merani Martvili • Merani Tbilisi

=== From Liga 3 ===
Relegated to Liga 4

Merani Tbilisi-2 • Chikhura

Promoted to Liga 2

Aragvi • Shturmi • Rustavi

== Teams ==
Locations of Liga 3 football clubs in 2024

The clubs are listed below in alphabetical order. Even though some of them were temporarily using football grounds in other cities/regions, the map displays their legal addresses.

Clubs	Position in 2023	Location	Region	Stadium
Bakhmaro	12th	Chokhatauri	Guria	Boris Paichadze stadium
Betlemi	2nd in Liga 4	Keda	Adjara	Archil Partenadze stadium
Borjomi	11th	Borjomi	Samtskhe-Javakheti	Grigol Jomartidze Stadium, Khashuri
Gardabani	3rd in Liga 4	Gardabani	Kvemo Kartli	Centraluri
Gonio	1st in Liga 4	Gonio	Adjara	Angisa training base
Gori	8th	Gori	Shida Kartli	Kartli Stadium
Guria	9th	Lanchkhuti	Guria	Evgrapi Shevardnadze Stadium
Iberia-2 1999^{[a]}	7th	Tbilisi	Tbilisi	Bendela
Locomotive-2	10th	Tbilisi	Tbilisi	Olympic complex
Matchakhela	14th	Khelvachauri	Adjara	Akhalsopeli
Merani M	9th in Liga 2	Martvili	Samegrelo-Z.Svaneti	Murtaz Khurtsilava stadium
Merani Tbilisi	10th in Liga 2	Tbilisi	Tbilisi	Shromiti rezervebi
Meshakhte	5th	Tkibuli	Imereti	Vladimer Bochorishvili Stadium
Orbi^{[b]}	6th	Tbilisi	Tbilisi	Grigol Jomartidze stadium, Khashuri
Varketili	4th	Tbilisi	Tbilisi	Centraluri, Kaspi
Zestaponi	13th	Zestaponi	Imereti	David Abashidze Stadium

^{a} Known as Saburtalo-2 until this season

^{b} Known as Irao until this season

== League table ==
Pos	Team	Pld	W	D	L	GF	GA	GD	Pts	Promotion, qualification or relegation
1	Gonio (C, P)	30	20	4	6	81	36	+45	64	Promotion to Erovnuli Liga 2
2	Meshakhte (P)	30	18	6	6	54	22	+32	60	Promotion to Erovnuli Liga 2
3	Merani M (P)	30	17	7	6	60	30	+30	58	Qualification for promotion play-offs
4	Iberia-2 1999 (P)	30	15	10	5	52	26	+26	55	Qualification for promotion play-offs
5	Orbi	30	15	9	6	50	32	+18	54	
6	Gori	30	15	8	7	49	22	+27	53	
7	FC Merani Tbilisi	30	11	10	9	49	42	+7	43	
8	Betlemi	30	12	5	13	49	61	−12	41	
9	Locomotive-2	30	12	4	14	47	58	−11	40	
10	Gardabani	30	9	7	14	42	41	+1	34	
11	Varketili	30	9	6	15	46	54	−8	33	
12	Borjomi	30	8	4	18	31	58	−27	28	
13	Bakhmaro	30	6	9	15	19	33	−14	27	
14	Zestaponi (R)	30	6	11	13	32	49	−17	26 (Note: Zestaponi were deducted three points for disciplinary issues)	Relegation to Liga 4
15	Matchakhela (R)	30	6	6	18	30	86	−56	24	Relegation to Liga 4
16	Guria (R)	30	5	6	19	30	71	−41	21	Relegation to Liga 4

Rules for classification: 1) Points; 2) Head-to-head points; 3) Head-to-head goal difference; 4) Head-to-head goals scored; 5) Head-to-head away goals scored (only if two teams); 6) Goal difference; 7) Goals scored.
(C) Champions; (P) Promoted; (R) Relegated

== Results ==
=== Regular season ===
Home \ Away	BKH	BET	BOR	GAR	GON	GOR	GUR	IB2	LC2	MAT	MRN	MRT	MES	ORB	VAR	ZES
Bakhmaro		1–2	2–0	0–0	1–2	0–2	0–0	0–2	0–1	3–2	0–0	0–0	1–2	1–1	0–0	2–0
Betlemi	2–1		3–1	1–0	2–3	0–1	0–0	0–3	2–3	5–1	1–4	1–0	1–0	1–1	2–3	2–2
Borjomi	1–0	0–1		3–1	1–2	0–1	2–0	0–1	2–2	1–0	2–0	0–0	1–0	1–4	0–4	2–1
Gardabani	1–2	5–1	4–1		0–1	0–0	3–0	0–1	4–0	6–1	1–0	1–2	1–2	1–1	2–0	2–2
Gonio	1–0	1–2	6–0	5–0		3–0	3–0	2–1	5–0	6–1	2–4	2–5	0–1	2–1	4–0	1–1
Gori	1–0	0–1	2–0	2–0	1–1		1–1	0–2	2–1	5–1	1–1	3–1	0–1	0–1	2–0	0–0
Guria	0–0	0–2	2–1	0–3	1–3	0–4		0–2	0–2	3–1	0–2	1–1	2–2	0–4	0–2	4–1
Iberia-2 1999	0–0	5–0	3–1	0–2	3–3	1–0	5–1		2–1	1–1	1–1	1–1	1–1	0–2	5–2	4–0
Locomotive-2	2–1	3–2	2–2	3–1	1–3	0–2	5–2	0–1		6–1	2–2	1–2	0–4	2–0	3–1	1–1
Matchakhela	1–2	2–1	1–0	1–0	1–4	0–10	1–8	1–1	2–1		1–0	1–1	1–4	1–1	1–1	2–1
Merani M	3–0	3–2	4–1	4–1	2–1	2–1	2–4	1–0	5–0	3–2		5–1	1–1	2–0	4–0	2–1
Merani Tbilisi	0–1	9–4	2–1	1–1	0–3	0–2	2–0	3–3	3–0	2–0	0–2		2–1	1–2	0–0	2–2
Meshakhte	0–0	4–1	3–0	2–0	1–3	1–1	7–0	1–0	2–1	4–0	0–0	1–0		0–1	1–0	3–0
Orbi	2–0	1–1	2–2	4–1	2–2	1–2	4–1	1–1	0–1	0–0	2–1	1–5	2–1		1–0	2–0
Varketili	4–1	2–2	3–4	1–1	2–6	2–2	4–0	0–1	4–1	3–0	2–0	1–2	1–2	1–4		2–1
Zestaponi	1–0	2–4	2–1	0–0	2–1	1–1	2–0	1–1	0–2	3–2	0–0	1–1	1–2	1–2	2–1	

Legend: Blue = home team win; Yellow = draw; Red = away team win.

=== Top goalscorers ===
As of 7 December 2024

Rank	Player	Club	Goals
1	(Georgia (country)) Kakha Kakhabrishvili	Gonio	23
2	(Georgia (country)) Zurab Beridze	Betlemi	21
3	(Uzbekistan) Javohir Esankulov	Merani Martvili	19
4	(Georgia (country)) Tato Abuselidze	Gonio	16
4	(Georgia (country)) Dimitri Gurtskaia	Meshakhte	16

=== Promotion play-offs ===
12 December
13:00 GET

Iberia-2 1999	2–2	Aragvi
Khachidze 36' (pen.); G.Mamageishvili 70'	Report	Kukalia 32' (o.g.); Janelidze 85'

Bendela stadium, Tbilisi
Referee: A.Parjikia
16 December
13:00 GET

Aragvi	0–1	Iberia-2 1999
Bregvadze (penalty missed) 90+9'	Report	Khachidze 72' (pen.)

Central stadium, Sartichala
Referee: I.Kherkhadze

12 December
19:00 GET

Shturmi	0–1	Merani Martvili
	Report	Jimsheleishvili 90+6'

Sartichala Central stadium
Referee: J.Khorava
16 December
13:00 GET

Merani Martvili	1–1 (a.e.t.)	Shturmi
Rasulov 120'	Report	Ugrekhelidze 39'

Murtaz Khurtsilava stadium
Referee: B.Ninua

Both Merani Martvili and Iberia-2 1999 gained promotion to Erovnuli Liga 2

== See also ==
• 2024 Erovnuli Liga

• 2024 Erovnuli Liga 2

• 2024 Liga 4

• 2024 Georgian Cup
