= Derebey =

Feudal lord in 18th-century Anatolia

A derebey (trans. from Tirebey, riverside castle lord) was a feudal lord in Anatolia and the Pontic areas of Lazistan and Adjara in the 18th century, with considerable independence from the central government of the Ottoman Empire.

Derebeys were required to provide military assistance in time of war, but ruled and administered their own territories, with total freedom in practical terms, and often forming local dynasties. Their emergence was often sparked by the gradual abandonment of the timar system administered by the military fiefdom of sipahis, and the tendency of the central government to sub-contract tax revenues as of the 18th century, receiving a determined sum from the derebey and outsourcing to them the task of collecting from the taxpayers themselves. In official terminology, these intermediaries were often referred to as âyân, although other terms were also used for describing this class whose official status, effective powers and geographical extent of authority could vary greatly from one derebey to another, and could also evolve differently over time. The particular characteristics of their region of authority, such as economic development or its becoming an issue within contexts of international politics, also greatly influenced derebeys' destinies. While the derebeys did not seek to overthrow the Ottoman state, they did seek autonomy from the empire for themselves and their heirs. Through their collection and control of tax revenues in their region as well as only providing armed men for the sultan's wars when it benefited their interests, the derebeys demonstrated a lack of centralized authority in the Ottoman state during the 18th and early 19th centuries.

The Russo-Turkish War of 1768–1774 saw an increase in the power and influence of the derebeys, due to the reliance of the Ottoman government on their assistance. By the end of the 18th century, during the reign of Sultan Selim III, most of Anatolia was ruled by derebeys, and their role in Ottoman affairs was prominent. Selim's successor, Mahmud II (who followed the year-long reign of Mustafa IV), oversaw the decline of the derebeys as the Ottoman government became increasingly centralised and administration was conducted by appointed governors. In the 19th century, the term came to be applied to the powerful hereditary landowners of southern and eastern Turkey. By 1866 the remaining derebeys were subjugated by a military expedition in the Çukurova region.

The derebeys gradually Ottomanized, i.e. became part of the mechanics of the central government, with the re-strengthening of Ottoman central power in the 19th century. Many members of derebey families left lasting works serving general welfare, while others were also involved in bitter struggles that gave rise to public revolts, such as that of Atçalı Kel Mehmet Efe.

== Notable derebey families ==
- Karaosmanoğlu family based in Akhisar, and later in Manisa
- Katipzade family based in İzmir,
- Cihanoğlu family based in Koçarlı
- Arpazlı family based in Nazilli
- Tuzcuoğlu family based in Rize
- Kozanoğlu family based in Kozan
- Menemencioğlu family based in Karaisalı
- Osman Pazvantoğlu based in Vidin
- Alemdar Mustafa Pasha based in Rusçuk
- Himşiaşvili (Hamşioğlu) based in Acara

== See also ==
- Ottoman military reforms
