= Trebizond Eyalet =

Administrative division of the Ottoman Empire from 1598 to 1867

Trebizond Eyalet ایالت طربزون (Ottoman Turkish) Eyalet-i Trabzon
- Eyalet of the Ottoman Empire
- 1598–1867
- Flag

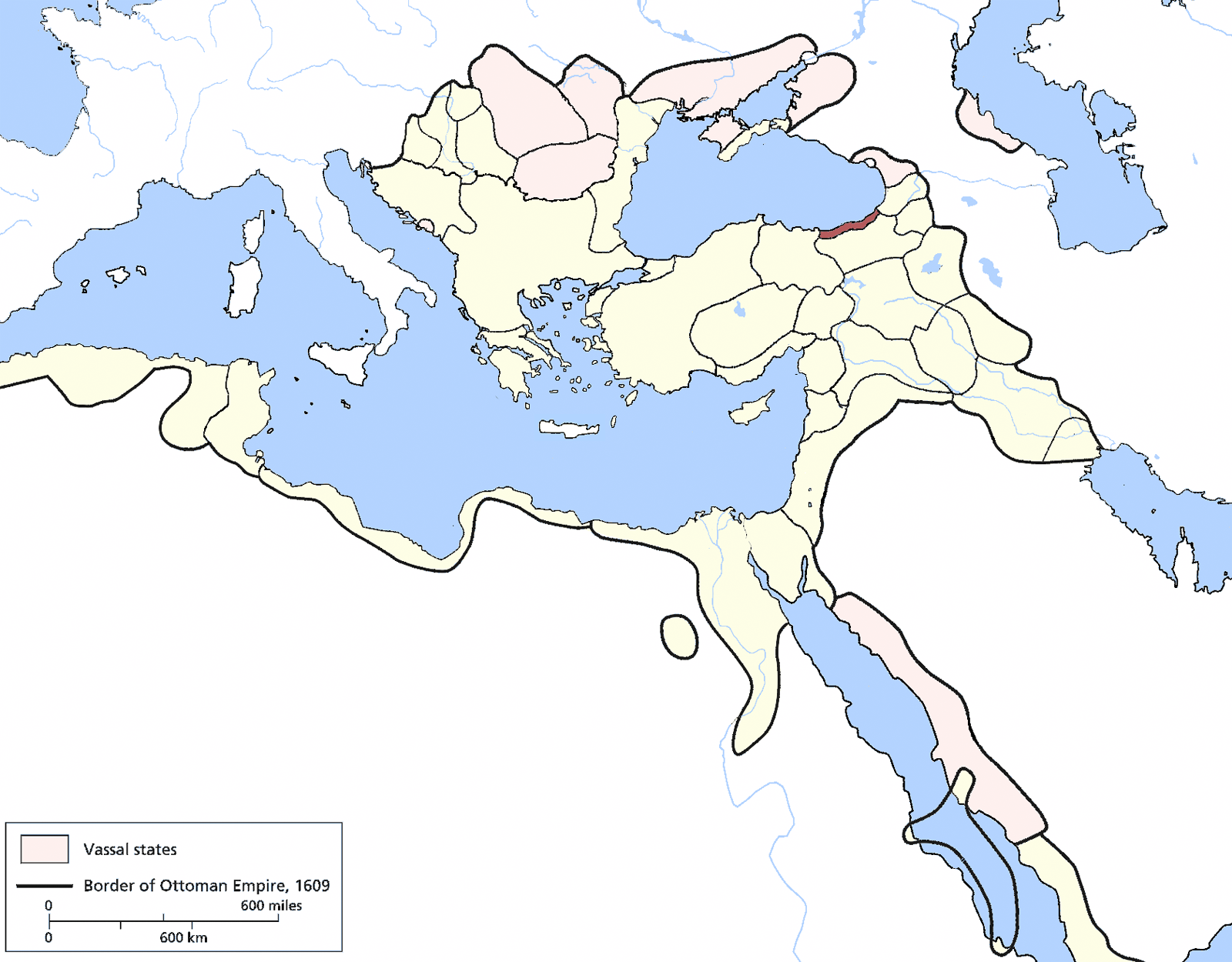
- The Trebizond Eyalet in 1609
- Capital: Trebizond
- History
  - Established: 1598
  - Disestablished: 1867
Preceded by	Succeeded by
Erzurum Eyalet	Trebizond Vilayet

Trebizond Eyalet (Ottoman Turkish: ایالت طربزون, romanized: Eyālet-i Ṭrabzōn) or Trabzon Beylerbeyliği was an eyalet of the Ottoman Empire.

Established in 1598, it remained a primarily Christian region into the 17th century, well after the rest of Anatolia had been converted to Islam. This province has experienced various rebellions, such as the Tuzcuoğlu rebellions. Its reported area in the 19th century was 10,507 square miles (27,210 km^{2}).

== Administrative divisions ==
Sanjaks of Trebizond Eyalet in the 17th century:
1. Sanjak of Gümüşhane
2. Sanjak of Jankha
3. Sanjak of Vitze
4. Sanjak of Gonio
5. Sanjak of Batumi
Sanjaks in 1732-1740
1. Sanjak of Trebizond
2. Sanjak of Gönye
3. Sanjak of Batumi
Sanjaks in the early 19th century:
1. Sanjak of Trebizond
2. Sanjak of Giresun
3. Sanjak of Lazistan

== See also ==
- Chepni
- Pontic Greeks

== Bibliography ==
- Lowry, Heath W. (2003). The Nature of the Early Ottoman State. Albany: State University of New York Press. ISBN 9780791456361.
