= Gonio (settlement) =

- Settlement
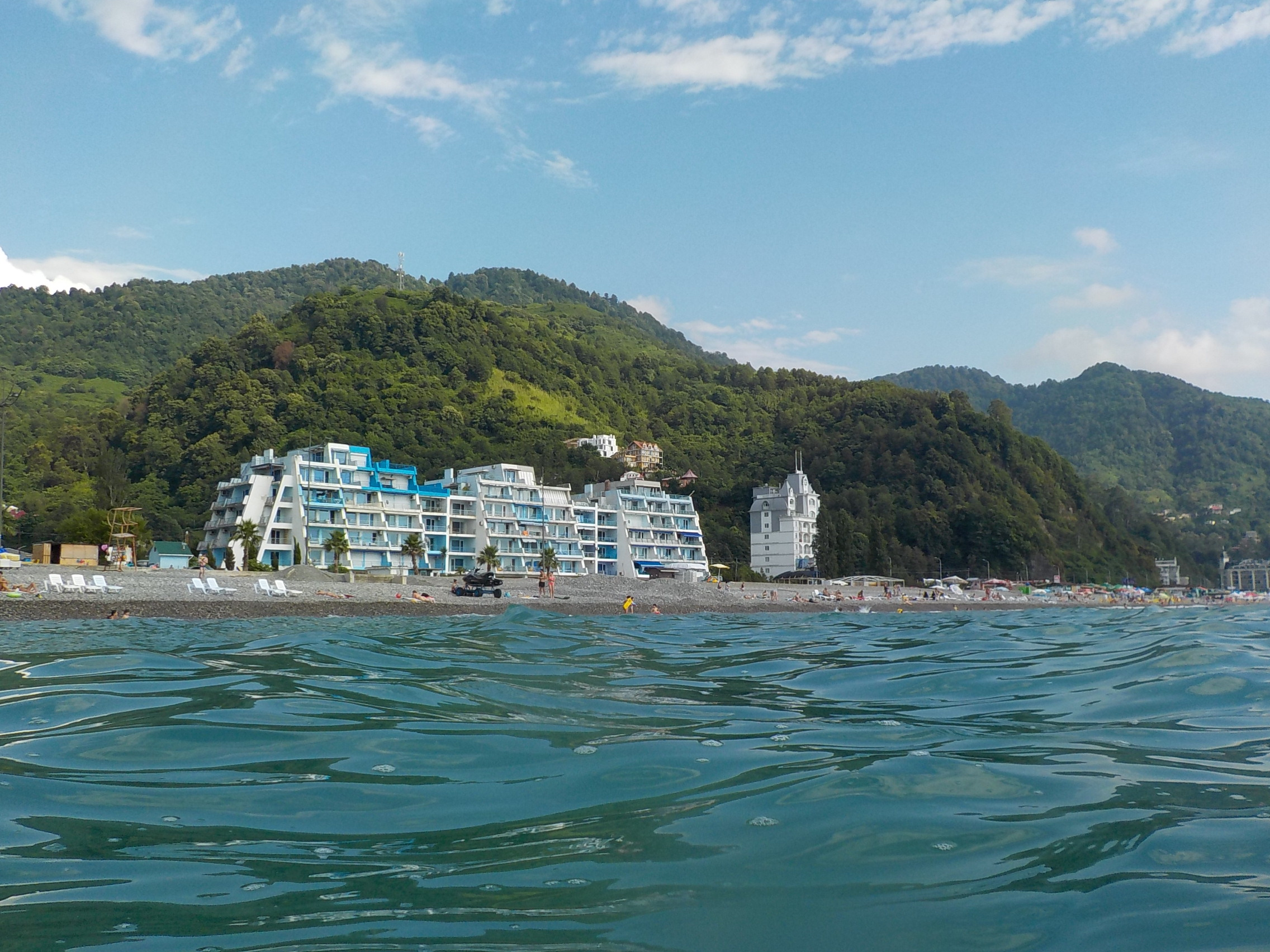
- Gonio beach
- Interactive map of Gonio
- Coordinates: 41°33′35″N 41°34′20″E
- Country: Georgia
- Region: Adjara

Population
  - Total: 2,886
- Time zone: UTC+4

Gonio (Georgian: გონიო) is a settlement south of Batumi, in the Gonio-Kvariati district of the city. It is located on the left side of the river Chorokhi. Gonio is one of the popular Black Sea resorts in Georgia. A radar station is located in Gonio. According to the data of 2002, 2,886 people live in the settlement.

== History ==
According to the archaeological data, the oldest settlement in Gonio dates back 8-7 BC. In the first century AD, the fortress Apsarunti was built in Gonio. After the 12th century it was called Gonio Fortress. From 1547 to 1878 Gonio was occupied by Ottomans. After the Russian-Turkish war of 1877-1878 Gonio became Georgian again. According to the Treaty of San Stefano Gonio, as well as the whole Adjara, was given to Russian Empire. Gonio, as village became the part of Batumi district. At the same time it was the center of Gonio police. From 1930 Gonio was a part of Khelvachauri region. In 2011, after Batumi expanded borders, it got into the administrative boundaries of the city.

== Gonio fortress ==
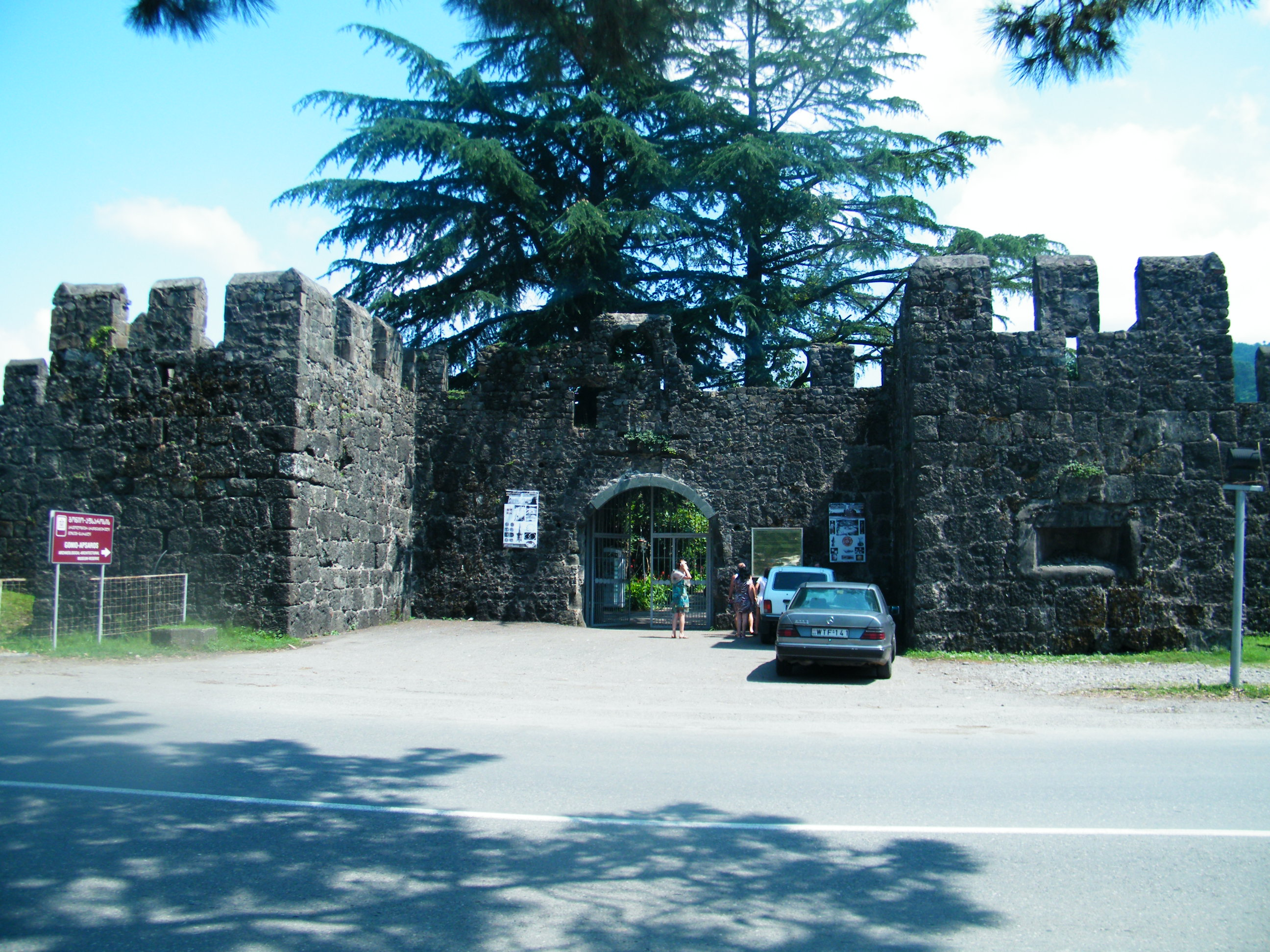
The main gateway

Gonio fortress is a Roman fortification in Adjara, Georgia. The fortress is located 15 km south of Batumi, at the mouth of the Chorokhi river. Plinius II was the first to mention Apsirtus in the first century AD and this is the oldest reference about fortress. There is also a reference to the ancient name of the site in Appian's Mithridatic Wars (second century AD). In the second century AD it was a well-fortified Roman city within Colchis.

The grave of Saint Matthias, one of the 12 apostles, is believed to be inside the Gonio fortress. However, this is unverifiable version as the Georgian government currently prohibits digging near the supposed gravesite. Other archaeological excavations are however taking place on the grounds of the fortress, focusing on Roman layers. There are still some fundaments inside, but no signs giving information.

== Gonio today ==
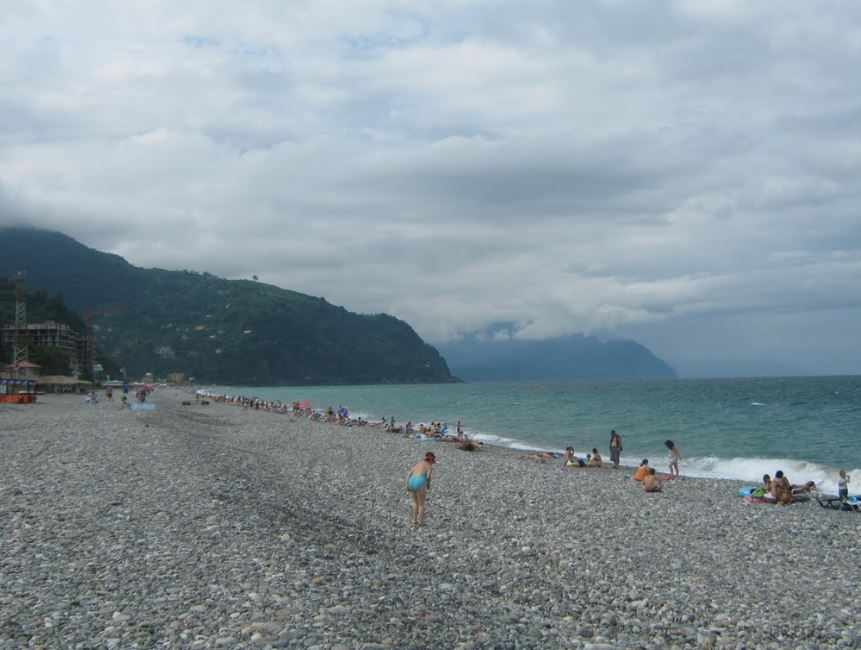
Gonio beach

Nowadays, Gonio is experiencing a tourism boom. Most tourists come from Tbilisi in the summer months. Gonio's beaches are cleaner than Batumi's beaches (located 10 km to the north).

== See also ==
- Adjara
