= Gonio (fortress) =

Roman fortress in Adjara, Georgia

Gonio-Apsaros Fortress
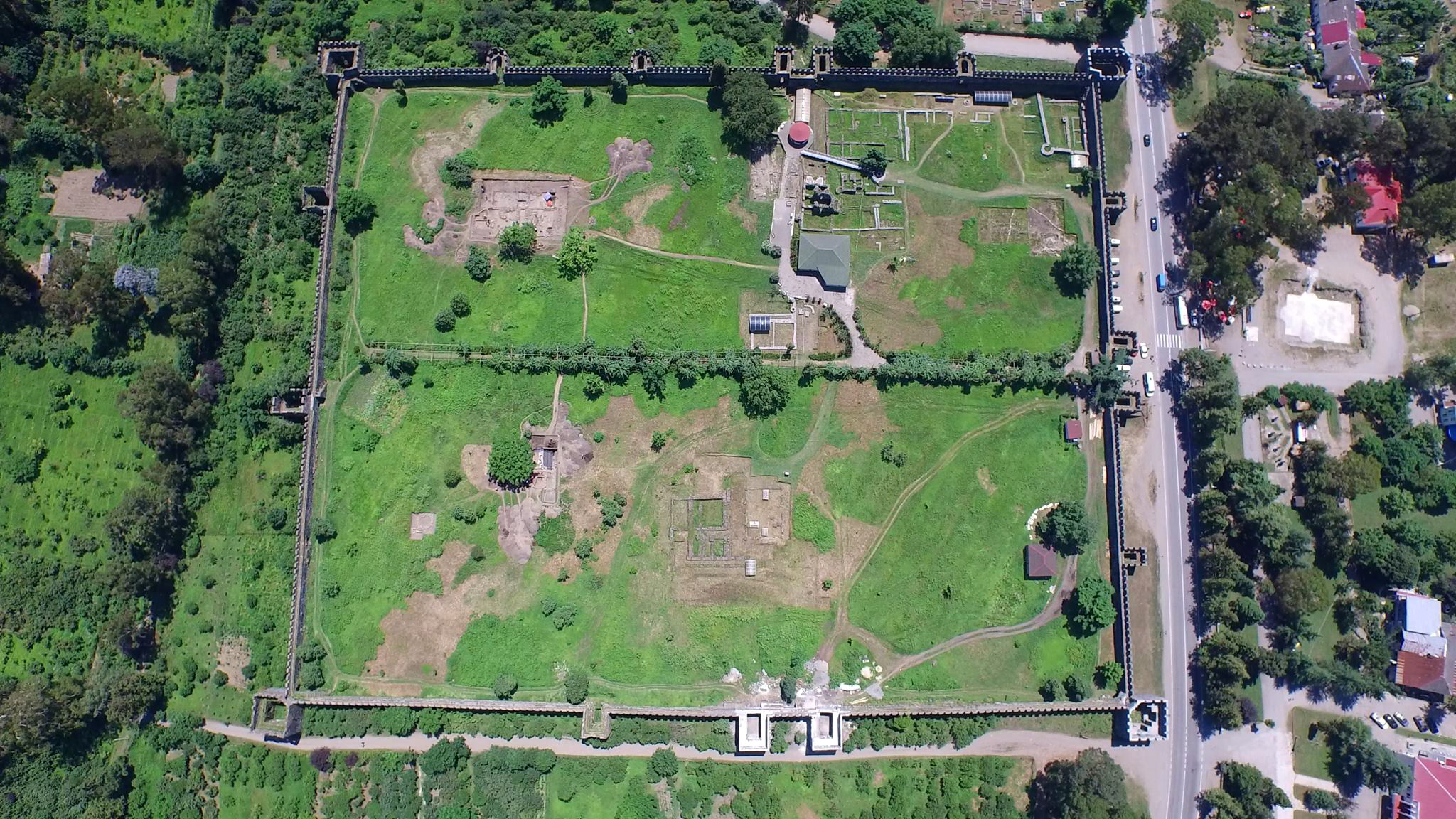
- Aerial view of Gonio fortress

- Location within Georgia
- 41°34′23″N 41°34′25″E
- Type: Settlement
- Location: Adjara, Georgia
- Region: Lazica

Site notes
- Condition: In ruins

Gonio (Georgian: გონიოს ციხე, previously called Apsarus or Apsaros (Ancient Greek: Ἄψαρος) and Apsyrtus or Apsyrtos (Ἄψυρτος)) is a Roman fortification in Adjara, Georgia, on the Black Sea, 15 km south of Batumi, at the mouth of the Chorokhi river. The village sits 4 km north of the Turkish border. Its name was connected with the myth of Medea and her brother Absyrtus.

The oldest reference to the fortress is by Pliny the Elder in the Natural History (1st century AD). There is also a reference to the ancient name of the site in Appian’s Mithridatic Wars (2nd century AD). In the 2nd century AD it was a well-fortified Roman city within Colchis. The town was also known for its theatre and hippodrome. Procopius, writing in the 6th century, speaks of the remains of its public buildings as proving that it was once a place of some importance.

It later came under Byzantine influence. The name "Gonio" is first attested in Michael Panaretos in the 14th century. In addition, there was a short-lived Genoese trade factory at the site. In 1547, Gonio was taken by the Ottoman Empire, who held it until 1878, when, via the San-Stefano Treaty, Adjara became part of the Russian Empire. In the fall of 1647, according to Evliya Çelebi, Gonio was captured by a Cossack navy of 70 chaikas, but quickly recovered by Ghazi Sidi Ahmed, ruler of the Tortum sanjak, with a force of 1,000 Turks and 3,000 "Mingrelians".

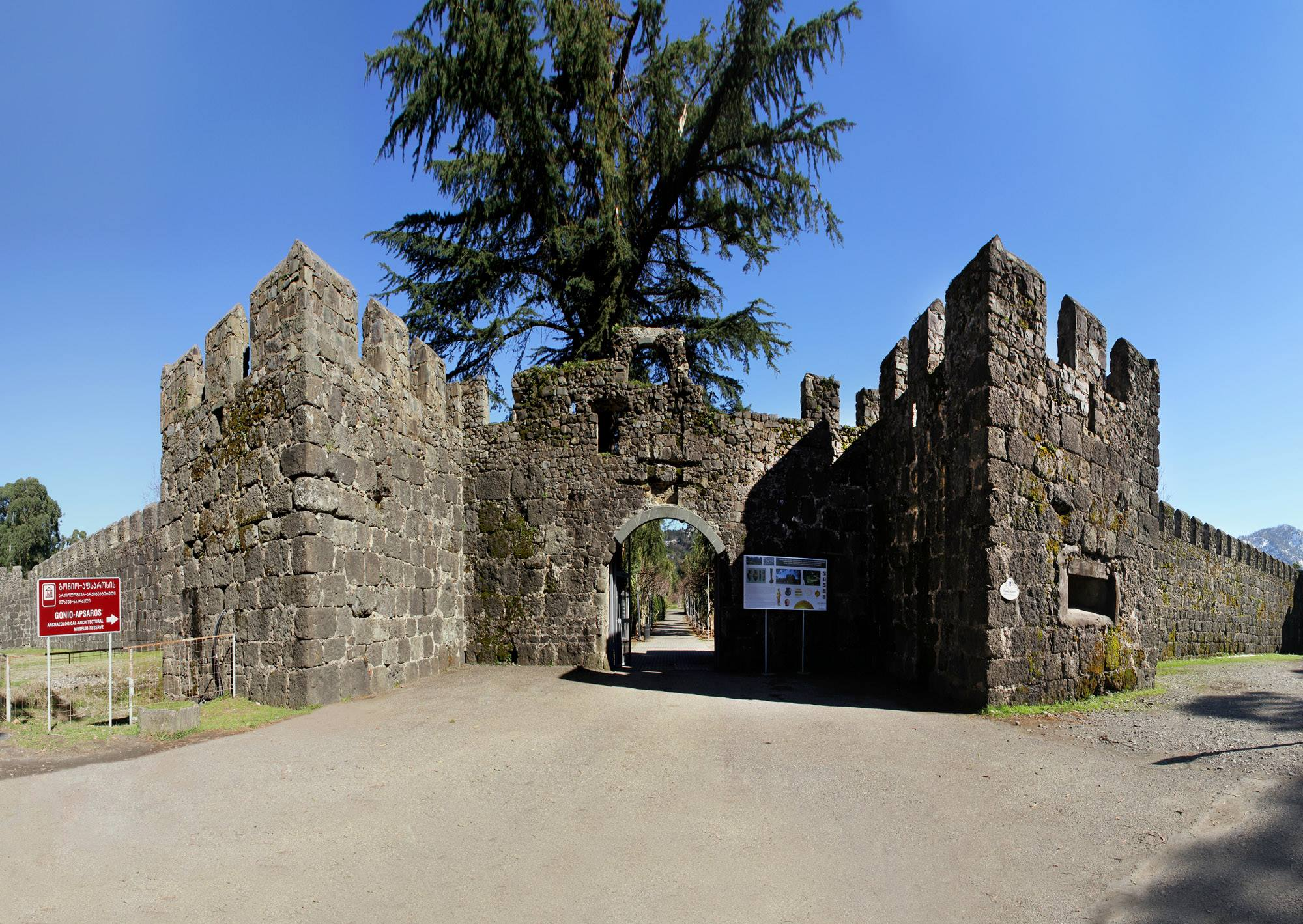
The gate of the Gonio castle

The grave of Saint Matthias, one of the twelve apostles, is believed to be inside the Gonio fortress. This is unverifiable as the Georgian government currently prohibits digging near the supposed graveside. Other archaeological excavations are however taking place on the grounds of the fortress, focusing on Roman layers.

Gonio is currently experiencing a tourism boom. Most tourists come from Tbilisi in the summer months to enjoy beaches that are generally regarded as cleaner than Batumi's beaches (located 15 km to the north).

== Archaeological investigations ==
From 1995, the Gornio-Apsarus archaeological expedition has carried out investigations at the Roman fort. The Polish Centre of Mediterranean Archaeology at the University of Warsaw funded photogrammetric, topographical, and geophysical surveys of the site in 2012.

== Layout ==
The fortress is rectangular, and was built with four gates and 22 towers along the circuit of walls enclosing the site; 18 of the towers still survive.
