= Giorgi Gabadze =

Georgian association football player

Personal information
- Date of birth: 2 March 1995 (age 31)
- Place of birth: Sankt Petersburg, Russia
- Height: 1.83 m (6 ft 0 in)
- Position: Defender

Team information
- Current team: Dordoi Bishkek
- Number: 27

Youth career
- 2008–2011: Locomotive Tbilisi

Senior career*
Years	Team	Apps	(Gls)
2011–2013	Locomotive	31	(1)
2013	Torpedo	7	(0)
2014–2024	Locomotive	218	(4)
2025–2026	Gareji	28	(0)
2026–	Dordoi Bishkek	1	(0)

International career^{‡}
2011–2012	Georgia U17	3	(0)
- * Club domestic league appearances and goals as of 14 March 2026 ‡ National team caps and goals as of 8 April 2025

Giorgi Gabadze (Georgian: გიორგი გაბაძე, born 2 March 1995) is a Georgian footballer who plays as an right back for Kyrgyz Premier League club Dordoi Bishkek.

During the fourteen years spent at Locomotive, Gabadze has played record-breaking 272 official games for the team in all competitions. He was also a member of the U17 team which reached the semifinals of 2012 UEFA European Championship.

== Career ==
=== Club ===
Gabadze started his career at Locomotive in 2008. He first played in the reserves before making his debut for the senior team in the 2nd division on 9 October 2011 against Meshakhte. A year later, Gabadze netted for the first time in a 5–0 win over Adeli, although his debut top-division goal came in 2020 against Telavi.

Gabadze made his first European appearance during his short spell at Torpedo against MŠK Žilina in 2013. More memorable was Locomotive's 2020–21 UEFA Europa League campaign when the team knocked out two opponents and reached the 3rd qualifying round with Gabadze taking part in all three games.

In February 2022, Gabadze was introduced as a new captain. Later in the same year, he played the cup final for 4th division club Locomotive-2, who in contrast with the senior team managed to reach this stage of the competition.

In December 2023, Gabadze featured in the 250th official game for the club across all competitions. He left Locomotive after the 2024 season and moved to Erovnuli Liga debutants Gareji.

=== International ===
Gabadze was a squad member of the national U17s which qualified for the 2012 UEFA European Championship held in Slovenia. He played three games, including a semifinal tie against Netherlands.

Later Gabadze was an unused substitute for U19s in the 2014 UEFA European Championship elite round.

== Career statistics ==
As of 29 May 2025

Appearances and goals by club, season and competition
Club	Season	League			National cup		European		Other		Total	
Club	Season	Division	Apps	Goals	Apps	Goals	Apps	Goals	Apps	Goals	Apps	Goals
Locomotive	2011–12	Pirveli Liga	10	0	—		—		—		10	0
Locomotive	2012–13	Pirveli Liga	21	1	2	0	—		—		23	1
Torpedo	2013–14	Umaglesi Liga	7	0	1	0	1 (Note: Appearances in UEFA Europa League qualifiers)	0	–		9	0
Locomotive	2013–14	Pirveli Liga	7	0	—		—		—		7	0
Locomotive	2014–15	Pirveli Liga	22	0	1	0	—		—		23	0
Locomotive	2015–16	Umaglesi Liga	13	0	–		—		—		13	0
Locomotive	2016	Erovnuli Liga	10	2	3	0	—		—		13	2
Locomotive	2017	Erovnuli Liga	17	0	1	0	—		—		18	0
Locomotive	2018	Erovnuli Liga	33	0	1	0	—		—		34	0
Locomotive	2019	Erovnuli Liga	7	0	1	0	—		—		8	0
Locomotive	2020	Erovnuli Liga	13	1	—		3	0	—		16	1
Locomotive	2021	Erovnuli Liga	28	0	2	0	—		—		30	0
Locomotive	2022	Erovnuli Liga	19	0	1	0	—		—		20	0
Locomotive	2023	Erovnuli Liga 2	29	3	2	0	—		2 (Note: Appearances in Erovnuli Liga playoffs)	0	33	3
Locomotive	2024	Erovnuli Liga 2	20	0	2	0	—		—		22	0
Locomotive	Total		249	5	16	0	3	0	2	0	270	5
Locomotive-2	2022	Liga 4	—		2	0	—		—		2	0
Gareji	2025	Erovnuli Liga	15	0	0	0	—		—		15	0
Career total			271	5	19	0	4	0	2	0	296	5

== Honours ==
Locomotive

- Georgian Cup runner-up: 2019, 2022
