= 2011–12 Pirveli Liga =

2011–12 Pirveli Liga was the 23rd season of the Georgian Pirveli Liga. The season began on 23 August 2011 and finished on 27 May 2012.

== Format ==
In the first stage, the teams divided into two groups: A and B. Each of the 10 teams. Groups in the first and second place teams (of four), will fight Umaglesi Liga for the transition. The remaining 16 teams will continue to struggle to maintain a place in the league.

== Teams ==
Clubs	Condition 2010–11	Region	Stadium	Capacity
Samtredia	Umaglesi Liga	Imereti	Erosi Manjgaladze Stadium	15,000
Chikhura Sachkhere	4	Imereti	Tsentral Stadium (Sachkhere)	2,000
Dinamo Batumi	5	Adjara	Batumi Stadium	30,000
Guria Lanchkhuti	6	Guria	Evgrapi Shevardnadze Stadium	22,000
Kolkheti Khobi	7	Samegrelo	Tsentral Stadium (Khobi)	12,000
Imereti Khoni	8	Imereti	Tsentral Stadium (Khoni)	2,000
Meshakhte Tkibuli	9	Imereti	Vladimer Bochorishvili Stadium	11,700
Norchi Dinamoeli Tbilisi	10	Tbilisi	Sport-kompleksi Shatili	2,000
Chkherimela Kharagauli	11	Imereti	Kharagauli Stadium	6,000
Adeli Batumi	12	Adjara	Tsentral Stadium (Batumi)	15,000
Mertskhali Ozurgeti	13	Guria	Megobroba Stadium	3,500
Samgurali Tskaltubo	14	Imereti	26 May Stadium	12,000
Skuri Tsalenjikha	15	Samegrelo	Sasha Kvaratskhelia Stadium	4,000
Chiatura Sachkhere	16	Imereti	Temur Maghradze Stadium	11,700
Lokomotivi Tbilisi	17	Tbilisi	Mikheil Meskhi Stadium	24,680
Silori Vani	Meore Liga	Imereti	Grigol Nikoleishvili Stadium	2,500
STU Tbilisi	Meore Liga	Tbilisi	Sport-kompleksi Shatili	2,000
Meskheri Akhaltsikhe	Meore Liga	Samtskhe-Javakheti	Tsentral Stadium (Akhaltsikhe)	4,000
Aeti Sokhumi	Meore Liga	Abkhazia	Sport-kompleksi Shatili	2,000
Zooveti Tbilisi	Meore Liga	Tbilisi	Sportis Akademiis Stadioni	1,000

== League tables ==
=== I round ===
==== A Group ====
Pos	Team	Pld	W	D	L	GF	GA	GD	Pts	Qualification
1	Dinamo Batumi (P)	18	13	3	2	28	9	+19	42	Qualification for Promotion round
2	Mertskhali Ozurgeti	18	12	2	4	24	17	+7	38	Qualification for Promotion round
3	Chiatura	18	11	4	3	30	16	+14	37	Qualification for Relegation round
4	Chkherimela Kharagauli	18	8	4	6	24	24	0	28	Qualification for Relegation round
5	STU Tbilisi	18	8	2	8	39	42	−3	26	Qualification for Relegation round
6	Lokomotivi Tbilisi	18	5	5	8	30	28	+2	20	Qualification for Relegation round
7	Kolkheti Khobi	18	5	5	8	18	19	−1	20	Qualification for Relegation round
8	Meskheti Akhaltsikhe	18	5	2	11	19	25	−6	17	Qualification for Relegation round
9	Samtredia	18	3	5	10	15	30	−15	14	Qualification for Relegation round
10	Meshakhte Tkibuli	18	2	4	12	16	33	−17	10	Qualification for Relegation round

Source: Soccerway
Rules for classification: 1) points; 2) goal difference; 3) number of goals scored.
(P) Promoted

==== B Group ====
Pos	Team	Pld	W	D	L	GF	GA	GD	Pts	Qualification
1	Chikhura Sachkhere (P)	18	16	1	1	40	6	+34	49	Qualification for Promotion round
2	Guria Lanchkhuri	18	12	3	3	41	15	+26	39	Qualification for Promotion round
3	Imereti Khoni	18	9	2	7	31	25	+6	29	Qualification for Relegation round
4	Skuri Tsalenjikha	18	8	3	7	25	26	−1	27	Qualification for Relegation round
5	Zooveti Tbilisi	18	8	3	7	23	29	−6	27	Qualification for Relegation round
6	Norchi Dinamoeli Tbilisi	18	8	2	8	30	24	+6	26	Qualification for Relegation round
7	Samgurali Tskaltubo	18	6	5	7	27	23	+4	23	Qualification for Relegation round
8	Adeli Batumi	18	4	1	13	19	36	−17	13	Qualification for Relegation round
9	Sulori Vani	18	2	6	10	11	35	−24	12	Qualification for Relegation round
10	Aeti Sokhumi	18	3	2	13	13	41	−28	11	Qualification for Relegation round

Source: Soccerway
Rules for classification: 1) points; 2) goal difference; 3) number of goals scored.
(P) Promoted

=== II Round ===
==== A Group ====
Pos	Team	Pld	W	D	L	GF	GA	GD	Pts	Qualification or relegation
1	Chiatura	20	11	4	5	31	22	+9	37	
2	Kolkheti Khobi	20	9	7	4	25	13	+12	34	
3	Samtredia	20	8	9	3	19	11	+8	33	
4	Samgurali Tskaltubo	20	9	4	7	29	17	+12	31	
5	Skuri Tsalenjikha	20	7	6	7	20	20	0	27	
6	Meskheti Akhaltsikhe	20	6	7	7	11	18	−7	25	
7	Zooveti Tbilisi (R)	20	7	4	9	20	30	−10	25	Qualification for Relegation play-off
8	Aeti Sokhumi (R)	20	2	1	17	11	35	−24	7	Relegation to Meore Liga

Source: Soccerway
Rules for classification: 1) points; 2) goal difference; 3) number of goals scored.
(R) Relegated

==== B Group ====
Pos	Team	Pld	W	D	L	GF	GA	GD	Pts	Qualification or relegation
1	Norchi Dinamoeli Tbilisi	20	14	2	4	48	28	+20	44	
2	Imereti Khoni	20	12	3	5	39	23	+16	39	
3	STU Tbilisi	20	11	2	7	54	43	+11	35	
4	Mesakhte Tkibuli	20	9	3	8	35	32	+3	30	
5	Chkherimela Kharagauli	20	8	6	6	27	26	+1	30	
6	Lokomotivi Tbilisi	20	7	5	8	38	34	+4	26	
7	Sulori Vani (O)	20	4	1	15	18	47	−29	13	Qualification for Relegation play-off
8	Adeli Batumi (R)	20	2	4	14	33	47	−14	10	Relegation to Meore Liga

Source: Soccerway
Rules for classification: 1) points; 2) goal difference; 3) number of goals scored.
(O) Play-off winners; (R) Relegated

== See also ==
- 2011–12 Umaglesi Liga
- 2011–12 Georgian Cup
