= 2013–14 Pirveli Liga =

Pirveli Liga
- Season: 2013–14
- Dates: 30 August 2013 – 16 May 2014
- Champions: Shukura Kobuleti; Samtredia
- Promoted: Shukura Kobuleti; Samtredia; Dinamo Batumi; Kolkheti-1913
- Relegated: Imereti; Kakheti; Bakhmaro; Dila II; Sulori Vani
- Matches played: 338
- Top goalscorer: Budu Zivzivadze (Dinamo Tbilisi II) 23 goals

2013–14 Pirveli Liga was the 25th season of the Georgian Pirveli Liga. The season began on 30 August 2013 and finished on 16 May 2014.

== Format ==
27 teams were divided into groups A and B for a single two-round competition. Group leaders and runners-up gained promotion to the top tier while five clubs of these groups were relegated to the third division.

== Teams ==
=== Group A ===
| Team | Home Ground | Capacity |
|---|---|---|
| Adeli Batumi | Adeli Stadium | 1,500 |
| Algeti Marneuli | Sports Academy | 1,000 |
| Chkherimela Kharagauli | Soso Abashidze Stadium | 2,000 |
| Dinamo Tbilisi II | Digomi Training Ground | 1,000 |
| Gagra | Merani | 2,000 |
| Imereti Khoni | Martvili Central Stadium | 3,000 |
| Kakheti Telavi | Municipal Stadium | 12,000 |
| Kolkheti-1913 | Fazisi Stadium | 7,500 |
| Mertskhali Ozurgeti | Megobroba Stadium | 3,500 |
| Meshakhte Tkibuli | Vladimer Bochorishvili Stadium | 6,000 |
| Sapovnela Terjola | Central Stadium | 1,000 |
| Shukura Kobuleti | Chele Arena | 6,000 |
| Skuri Tsalenjikha | Sasha Kvaratskhelia Stadium | 4,500 |

=== Group B ===
| Team | Home Ground | Capacity |
|---|---|---|
| Bakhmaro Chokhatauri | Central Stadium | 2,000 |
| Betlemi Keda | Central Stadium | 1,000 |
| Chiatura | Temur Maghradze Stadium | 11,700 |
| Dila Gori II | Kartli Stadium | 1,500 |
| Kolkheti Khobi | Central Stadium | 12,000 |
| Lokomotive Tbilisi | Saguramo Football Ground | 700 |
| Matchakhela Khelvachauri | Central Stadium | 1,000 |
| Samgurali Tskaltubo | 26 May Stadium | 12,000 |
| Saburtalo Tbilisi | Bendela | 1,000 |
| Samtredia | Erosi Manjgaladze Stadium | 2,000 |
| Sasco Tbilisi | Shatili Arena | 2,000 |
| STU Tbilisi | Shatili Arena | 2,000 |
| Sulori Vani | Grigol Nikoleishvili Stadium | 2,000 |

== League tables ==
=== A Group ===
| Pos | Team | Pld | W | D | L | GF | GA | GD | Pts | Qualification |
|---|---|---|---|---|---|---|---|---|---|---|
| 1 | Shukura Kobuleti (P) | 24 | 18 | 3 | 3 | 72 | 23 | +49 | 57 | Promotion for Umaglesi Liga |
| 2 | Kolkheti-1913 (P) | 24 | 17 | 4 | 3 | 51 | 13 | +38 | 55 | Promotion for Umaglesi Liga |
| 3 | Dinamo Tbilisi II | 24 | 15 | 4 | 5 | 76 | 27 | +49 | 49 | |
| 4 | Gagra | 24 | 11 | 9 | 4 | 44 | 25 | +19 | 42 | |
| 5 | Sapovnela | 24 | 12 | 5 | 7 | 40 | 25 | +15 | 41 | |
| 6 | Algeti Marneuli | 24 | 10 | 4 | 10 | 38 | 37 | +1 | 34 | |
| 7 | Meshakhte Tkibuli | 24 | 8 | 8 | 8 | 37 | 38 | −1 | 32 | |
| 8 | Chkherimela Kharagauli | 24 | 6 | 5 | 13 | 29 | 54 | −25 | 23 | |
| 9 | Mertskhali Ozurgeti | 24 | 7 | 2 | 15 | 29 | 54 | −25 | 23 | |
| 10 | Skuri Tsalenjikha | 24 | 6 | 4 | 14 | 24 | 52 | −28 | 22 | |
| 11 | Adeli Batumi | 24 | 6 | 4 | 14 | 28 | 60 | −32 | 22 | |
| 12 | Imereti Khoni (R) | 24 | 6 | 3 | 15 | 26 | 56 | −30 | 21 | Relegation to Meore Liga |
| 13 | Kakheti Telavi (R) | 24 | 5 | 3 | 16 | 27 | 57 | −30 | 18 | Relegation to Meore Liga |

Source: Soccerway
Rules for classification: 1) points; 2) goal difference; 3) number of goals scored.
(P) Promoted; (R) Relegated

=== B Group ===
| Pos | Team | Pld | W | D | L | GF | GA | GD | Pts | Qualification |
|---|---|---|---|---|---|---|---|---|---|---|
| 1 | Samtredia | 26 | 21 | 2 | 3 | 64 | 24 | +40 | 65 | Promotion for Umaglesi Liga |
| 2 | Dinamo Batumi | 26 | 19 | 2 | 5 | 65 | 17 | +48 | 59 | Promotion for Umaglesi Liga |
| 3 | Matchakhela | 26 | 16 | 6 | 4 | 44 | 21 | +23 | 54 | |
| 4 | Sasco Tbilisi | 26 | 15 | 4 | 7 | 50 | 30 | +20 | 49 | |
| 5 | Locomotive Tbilisi | 26 | 15 | 2 | 9 | 68 | 35 | +33 | 47 | |
| 6 | Chiatura | 26 | 12 | 4 | 10 | 44 | 46 | −2 | 40 | |
| 7 | Samgurali Tskaltubo | 26 | 11 | 6 | 9 | 49 | 49 | 0 | 39 | |
| 8 | Saburtalo Tbilisi | 26 | 9 | 5 | 12 | 38 | 34 | +4 | 32 | |
| 9 | Kolkheti Khobi | 26 | 8 | 6 | 12 | 31 | 54 | −23 | 30 | |
| 10 | STU Tbilisi | 26 | 7 | 3 | 16 | 43 | 63 | −20 | 24 | |
| 11 | Betlemi Keda | 26 | 7 | 3 | 16 | 28 | 50 | −22 | 24 | |
| 12 | Bakhmaro Chokhatauri (R) | 26 | 5 | 8 | 13 | 35 | 65 | −30 | 23 | Relegation for Meore Liga |
| 13 | Dila Gori II (R) | 26 | 5 | 6 | 15 | 27 | 53 | −26 | 21 | Relegation for Meore Liga |
| 14 | Sulori Vani (R) | 26 | 2 | 3 | 21 | 14 | 59 | −45 | 9 | Relegation for Meore Liga |

Source: Soccerway
Rules for classification: 1) points; 2) goal difference; 3) number of goals scored.
(R) Relegated

== Top scorers ==
| Rank | Goalscorer | Team | Goals |
|---|---|---|---|
| 1 | (Georgia (country)) Budu Zivzivadze | Dinamo Tbilisi II | 23 |
| 2 | (Georgia (country)) Giorgi Chelebadze | Shukura Kobuleti | 22 |
| 3 | (Georgia (country)) Giorgi Bukhaidze | Samgurali Tskaltubo | 14 |

== See also ==
- 2013–14 Umaglesi Liga
- 2013–14 Georgian Cup
