= 2012–13 Pirveli Liga =

Pirveli Liga
- Season: 2012–13
- Dates: 25 August 2012 – 27 May 2013
- Champions: Guria Lanchkhuti; Tskhinvali
- Promoted: Guria Lanchkhuti; Tskhinvali
- Relegated: Racha Ambrolauri; Aeti Sokhumi
- Matches played: 363
- Top goalscorer: Tornike Kapanadze (Samgurali) 27 goals

2012–13 Pirveli Liga was the 24th season of the Georgian Pirveli Liga. It began on 25 August 2012 and finished on 27 May 2013.

== Format ==
24 teams were divided into groups A and B to take part in a three-round competition. Group leaders gained promotion to the top tier, while bottom two clubs were relegated to the third division.

== Teams ==
=== Group A ===
Team	Home Ground	Capacity
Dinamo Tbilisi II	Digomi Training Ground	1,000
Gagra	Merani	2,000
Guria Lanchkhuti	Evgrapi Shevardnadze stadium	8,000
STU Tbilisi	Shatili Arena	2,000
Imereti Khoni	Martvili Central Stadium	3,000
Skuri Tsalenjikha	Sasha Kvaratskhelia Stadium	4,500
Sasco Tbilisi	Shatili Arena	2,000
Betemi Keda	Keda Central Stadium	1,000
Chiatura	Temur Maghradze Stadium	11,700
Racha Ambrolauri	Ambrolauri Central Stadium	1,500
Sulori Vani	Grigol Nikoleishvili Stadium	2,000
Meshakhte Tkibuli	Vladimer Bochorishvili Stadium	6,000

=== Group B ===
Team	Home Ground	Capacity
Adeli Batumi	Adeli Stadium	1,000
Aeti Sokhumi	Shatili Arena	2,000
Samgurali Tskaltubo	26 May Stadium	12,000
Algeti Marneuli	Marneuli Central Stadium	2,000
Tskhinvali	Mikheil Meskhi Stadium	25,453
Lokomotive Tbilisi	Saguramo Football Ground	700
Kolkheti Khobi	Khobi Central Stadium	12,000
Mertskhali Ozurgeti	Megobroba Stadium	3,500
Samtredia	Erosi Manjgaladze Stadium	2,000
Chkherimela Kharagauli	Soso Abashidze Stadium	2,000
Shukura Kobuleti	Chele Arena	2,000
Liakhvi Achabeti	Kartli Stadium	1,500

== League tables ==
=== A Group ===
Pos	Team	Pld	W	D	L	GF	GA	GD	Pts	Qualification
1	Guria Lanchkhuti (P)	33	27	4	2	86	20	+66	85	Promotion for Umaglesi Liga
2	Dinamo Tbilisi II	33	21	6	6	100	42	+58	69	
3	Sasco Tbilisi	33	20	4	9	84	38	+46	64	
4	Gagra	33	16	5	12	63	46	+17	53	
5	Meshakhte Tkibuli	33	13	6	14	42	66	−24	45	
6	Chiatura	33	12	7	14	39	47	−8	43	
7	Imereti Khoni	33	12	7	14	37	46	−9	43	
8	STU Tbilisi	33	12	3	18	63	75	−12	39	
9	Skuri Tsalenjikha	33	10	8	15	33	51	−18	38	
10	Betlemi Keda	33	10	5	18	40	76	−36	35	
11	Sulori Vani	33	7	4	22	30	72	−42	25	
12	Racha Ambrolauri (R)	33	7	3	23	39	77	−38	24	Relegation to Meore Liga

Source: Soccerway
Rules for classification: 1) points; 2) goal difference; 3) number of goals scored.
(P) Promoted; (R) Relegated

=== B Group ===
Pos	Team	Pld	W	D	L	GF	GA	GD	Pts	Qualification
1	Tskhinvali (P)	30	25	2	3	82	15	+67	77	Promotion for Umaglesi Liga
2	Locomotive Tbilisi	30	19	6	5	70	29	+41	63	
3	Shukura Kobuleti	30	19	4	7	56	25	+31	61	
4	Kolkheti Khobi	30	18	3	9	43	28	+15	57	
5	Samtredia	30	17	4	9	53	37	+16	55	
6	Samgurali Tskaltubo	30	13	7	10	59	48	+11	46	
7	Algeti Marneuli	30	10	3	17	39	55	−16	33	
8	Mertskhali Ozurgeti	30	5	10	15	37	52	−15	25	
9	Chkherimela Kharagauli	30	6	2	22	34	91	−57	20	
10	Liakhvi Achabeti	30	4	6	20	29	74	−45	18	
11	Adeli Batumi	30	4	3	23	27	75	−48	15	
12	Aeti Sokhumi (R)	0	0	0	0	0	0	0	0	Relegation for Meore Liga

Source: Soccerway
Rules for classification: 1) points; 2) goal difference; 3) number of goals scored.
(P) Promoted; (R) Relegated

Following this success Guria returned to Umaglesi Liga after an eleven-year pause. Tskhinvali achieved the same goal from the first attempt.

== See also ==
- 2012–13 Umaglesi Liga
- 2012–13 Georgian Cup
