= Gega Diasamidze =

Georgian footballer (born 1992)

Personal information
- Full name: Gega Diasamidze
- Date of birth: 8 May 1992 (age 34)
- Place of birth: Tbilisi, Georgia
- Height: 1.87 m (6 ft 2 in)
- Position: Midfielder

Youth career
- 2009–2011: Olimpi Rustavi
- 2011–2012: AGF Aarhus

Senior career*
Years	Team	Apps	(Gls)
2011–2012	AGF Aarhus	1	(0)
2013	Sasco Tbilisi	11	(1)
2013	Dila Gori	6	(0)
2014	Dinamo Tbilisi II	9	(2)
2014	Sasco Tbilisi	5	(2)
2015–2017	Locomotive Tbilisi	79	(13)
2018–2019	Saburtalo Tbilisi	58	(18)
2020–2021	Shakhtyor Soligorsk	12	(2)
2021–2022	Locomotive Tbilisi	22	(3)
- * Club domestic league appearances and goals as of 31 December 2022

Giorgi "Gega" Diasamidze (born May 8, 1992) is a Georgian footballer who plays as a midfielder.

== Career ==
Gega Diasamidze was invited to train with AGF's reserve team in January 2011. And signed a contract with AGF Aarhus in the spring of 2011, then began to train with the A squad. On 6 March 2012, his contract was annulled.

Another AGF Georgian footballer Davit Devdariani recommended AGF Aarhus to get Davit Skhirtladze and Giorgi Diasamidze.
