= 2023 FC Dila Gori season =

Dila Gori
2023 season
- Owners: Starsportinvest
- Chairman: (Georgia (country)) Davit Koziashvili
- Manager: (Ukraine) Andriy Demchenko (until 24 August) (Georgia (country)) Irakli Modebadze (interim, until 3 October) (Argentina) Ever Demalde (until end of the season)
- Stadium: Tengiz Burjanadze Stadium
- Erovnuli Liga: 4th
- Georgian Cup: Quarterfinals (eliminated by Saburtalo)
- Georgian Super Cup: 4th
- UEFA Conference League: Third Qualifying Round (eliminated by APOEL)
- Top goalscorer: League: Thierry Gale; Mykola Kovtalyuk (10 goals each); All: Mykola Kovtalyuk (13)
- Biggest win: 5–0 vs Torpedo (H), 30 April, Erovnuli Liga; 6–1 vs Telavi (H) 1 June, Erovnuli Liga
- Biggest defeat: 3–0 vs Samgurali (H), 13 April, Erovnuli Liga; 3–0 vs Dinamo Tb (H), 29 August, Erovnuli Liga
| Home colours | Away colours |

The 2023 season was Dila's 72nd year in existence and 13th successive season in the first-tier Georgian football. Along with all members of the national league, the club competed in David Kipiani Cup. As the bronze medal winners of the previous league season, Dila also took part in UEFA Europa Conference League and the Georgian Super Cup.

The season covers the period from 1 January to 31 December.

== Squad changes ==
=== In ===
| Date | No. | Pos. | Player | Last club | Ref |
|---|---|---|---|---|---|
| 11 January | 3 | DF | (Georgia (country)) Zurab Tevzadze | (Georgia (country)) Telavi | |
| 11 January | 9 | MF | (Georgia (country)) Bidzina Makharoblidze | (Georgia (country)) Locomotive | |
| 11 January | 11 | MF | (Georgia (country)) Otar Parulava | (Georgia (country)) Gagra | |
| 11 January | 7 | MF | (Senegal) Honore Gomis | (Turkey) Menemen | |
| 3 February | 1 | GK | (Georgia (country)) Guram Chikashua | (Georgia (country)) WIT Georgia | |
| 25 February | 21 | GK | (Ukraine) Yevhen Kucherenko | (Kazakhstan) Aksu | |
| | 8 | MF | (Ghana) Blessing Assamoah | | |
| 25 February | 22 | FW | (Ukraine) Mykola Kovtalyuk | (Kazakhstan) Shakhter | |
| 4 March | 24 | DF | (Georgia (country)) Malkhaz Gagoshidze | (Georgia (country)) Merani | |
| | 17 | FW | (Georgia (country)) Giorgi Tsetskhladze | (Georgia (country)) Gori | |
| 16 May | 14 | FW | (Georgia (country)) Sergo Kukhianidze | (Georgia (country)) Samgurali | |
| 29 June | 6 | DF | (Georgia (country)) Aleksandre Andronikashvili | (Georgia (country)) Shukura | |
| 29 June | 9 | MF | (Georgia (country)) Mikheil Sardalishvili | (Georgia (country)) Shukura | |
| 30 June | 19 | FW | (South Africa) Bantu Mzwakali | (Georgia (country)) Shukura | |

=== Out ===
| Date | No. | Pos. | Player | Next club | Ref |
|---|---|---|---|---|---|
| 11 January | 4 | DF | (Georgia (country)) Anri Chichinadze | (Georgia (country)) Torpedo | |
| 11 January | 9 | FW | (Georgia (country)) Tornike Kapanadze | (Georgia (country)) Dinamo Batumi | |
| 11 January | 12 | MF | (Kenya) Amos Nondi | Ararat-Armenia | |
| 11 January | 21 | MF | (Ukraine) Yuriy Batyushyn | (Uzbekistan) Neftchi | |
| 11 January | 30 | GK | (Ukraine) Danylo Kanevtsev | | |
| 31 January | 13 | FW | (Georgia (country)) Nugzar Spanderashvili | (Georgia (country)) Sioni | |
| 31 January | 18 | MF | (Mali) Hadji Dramé | West Armenia | |
| 17 February | 6 | DF | (Georgia (country)) Tsotne Mosiashvili | (Georgia (country)) Dinamo Batumi | |
| 29 August | 10 | MF | (Barbados) Thierry Gale | (Austria) Rapid | |
| December | 9 | MF | (Georgia (country)) Mikheil Sardalishvili | | |
| December | 5 | MF | (Brazil) Alef Santos | | |
| December | 7 | MF | (Senegal) Honore Gomis | | |
| December | 25 | DF | (Brazil) Wanderson Silva | | |

=== Loans out ===
| Date | Until | No. | Pos. | Player | Next club | Ref |
|---|---|---|---|---|---|---|
| 19 June 2023 | End of season | 17 | FW | (Georgia (country)) Giorgi Tsetskhladze | (Georgia (country)) Gareji | |

== Pre-season friendlies ==
| Date | Opponents | Venue | Result | Score F–A | Ref. |
|---|---|---|---|---|---|
| January | WIT Georgia | H | W | 2–1 | |
| January | Spaeri | H | W | 2–1 | |
| January | Merani Tbilisi | H | W | 4–0 | |
| January | Samtredia | | D | 2–2 | |
| 7 February | Nazaf | Turkey | L | 0–2 | |
| 10 February | Uzbekistan U20 | Turkey | L | 1–2 | |
| 13 February | Oleksandriya | Turkey | L | 1–4 | |
| 16 February | Inhulets | Turkey | D | 1–1 | |
| 21 February | Saburtalo | Tbilisi | D | 0–0 | |

== Erovnuli Liga ==
=== League table (part) ===
| Pos | Team | Pld | W | D | L | GF | GA | GD | Pts | Qualification or relegation |
|---|---|---|---|---|---|---|---|---|---|---|
| 2 | Dinamo Tbilisi | 36 | 21 | 8 | 7 | 93 | 49 | +44 | 71 | Qualification for the Conference League first qualifying round |
| 3 | Torpedo Kutaisi | 36 | 16 | 12 | 8 | 55 | 37 | +18 | 60 | Qualification for the Conference League first qualifying round |
| 4 | Dila Gori | 36 | 17 | 9 | 10 | 56 | 39 | +17 | 60 | |
| 5 | Samgurali Tsqaltubo | 36 | 16 | 9 | 11 | 53 | 51 | +2 | 57 | |
| 6 | Saburtalo Tbilisi | 36 | 14 | 9 | 13 | 58 | 49 | +9 | 51 | Qualification for the Conference League second qualifying round (Note: Saburtalo Tbilisi qualified for the Conference League second qualifying round by winning the 2023 Georgian Cup.) |

Source: Erovnuli Liga, Soccerway
Rules for classification: 1) Points; 2) Head-to-head points; 3) Head-to-head goal difference; 4) Head-to-head goals scored; 5) Head-to-head away goals scored (only if two teams); 6) Goal difference; 7) Goals scored.

=== Results summary ===
| Overall | | | | | | | | Home | | | | | | Away | | | | | |
| Pld | W | D | L | GF | GA | GD | Pts | W | D | L | GF | GA | GD | W | D | L | GF | GA | GD |
|---|---|---|---|---|---|---|---|---|---|---|---|---|---|---|---|---|---|---|---|
| 36 | 17 | 9 | 10 | 56 | 39 | +17 | 60 | 10 | 2 | 6 | 34 | 20 | +14 | 7 | 7 | 4 | 22 | 19 | +3 |

Last updated: complete.
Source: See Results

=== Match results ===
Match details
| Date | Opponents | Venue | Result | Score | Scorer(s) |
|---|---|---|---|---|---|
| 25 February | Dinamo Tbilisi | H | L | 1–2 | Gale 40' |
| 4 March | Torpedo | A | D | 0–0 | |
| 8 March | Dinamo Batumi | H | D | 1–1 | Gale 3' |
| 12 March | Saburtalo | A | D | 0–0 | |
| 18 March | Shukura | H | W | 2–0 | Gomis 13', Gale 67' |
| 1 April | Samtredia | H | W | 1–0 | Makharoblidze 67' |
| 9 April | Gagra | A | D | 0–0 | |
| 13 April | Samgurali | H | L | 0–3 | |
| 21 April | Telavi | A | D | 2–2 | Gomis 30', Gale 51' |
| 25 April | Dinamo Tbilisi | A | W | 2–1 | o.g. 54', Kovtalyuk 61' |
| 30 April | Torpedo | H | W | 5–0 | Chiteishvili 42', Gagnidze 46', Gale 59', 70', Tsetskhladze 83' |
| 5 May | Dinamo Batumi | A | W | 2–0 | Wanderson 69' Kovtalyuk 86' |
| 9 May | Saburtalo | H | D | 1–1 | Kovtalyuk 73' |
| 15 May | Shukura | A | W | 3–2 | Gale 16', 20', Etou 67' |
| 20 May | Samtredia | A | W | 2–1 | Dzotsenidze 11', Gagnidze 33' |
| 24 May | Gagra | H | W | 1–0 | Etou 60' |
| 28 May | Samgurali | A | D | 2–2 | Gale 53', Gomis 70' |
| 1 June | Telavi | H | W | 6–1 | Gagnidze 6', 77', Gale 11', Gomis 31', Kovtalyuk 28', 75', |
| 5 June | Torpedo | A | L | 0–1 | |
| 20 August | Saburtalo | A | W | 2–1 | Andronikashvili 32' Sardalishvili 82' |
| 24 August | Shukura | H | W | 5–1 | Gaprindashvili 4', Victor 9', o.g.35', Kovtalyuk 63', 86' |
| 29 August | Dinamo Tbilisi | H | L | 0–3 | |
| 2 September | Samtredia | H | L | 1–3 | Gomis 89' |
| 16 September | Gagra | A | D | 0–0 | |
| 20 September | Dinamo Batumi | H | L | 1–3 | Sardalishvili 80' |
| 24 September | Samgurali | H | W | 2–0 | Wanderson 38', Sardalishvili 47' |
| 29 September | Telavi | A | L | 1–2 | Gomis 4' |
| 3 October | Dinamo Tbilisi | A | L | 1–3 | Gagnidze 72' |
| 7 October | Torpedo | H | L | 0–1 | |
| 20 October | Dinamo Batumi | A | D | 1–1 | Kovtalyuk 12' |
| 28 October | Saburtalo | H | W | 3–0 | Gomis 28', Victor 67', Gagnidze 90+3' |
| 4 November | Shukura | A | W | 2–1 | Gaprindashvili 14', 19' |
| 10 November | Samtredia | A | W | 2–1 | Gomis 15', Kovtalyuk 72' |
| 24 November | Gagra | H | W | 1–0 | Etou 17' |
| 28 November | Samgurali | A | L | 0–1 | |
| 2 December | Telavi | H | W | 3–1 | Kovtalyuk 64', Sardalishvili 72', Mzwakali 88' |

== Super Cup ==
Match details
| Round | Date | Opponents | Venue | Result | Score | Scorer | Ref. |
|---|---|---|---|---|---|---|---|
| Semifinal | 30 June | Dinamo Tbilisi | Mikheil Meskhi Stadium | L | 1–1, 2–4 pen. | Gomis 90' | |
| 3rd place | 4 July | Torpedo | Ramaz Shengelia Stadium | L | 0–0, 4–5 pen. | | |

== Georgian Cup ==
Match details
| Round | Date | Opponents | Venue | Result | Score | Scorers | Ref. |
|---|---|---|---|---|---|---|---|
| Round of 16 | 12 September | Gareji | A | W | 2–1 | Tevzadze 25', Kukhianidze 62' | |
| Quarterfinal | 24 October | Saburtalo | H | L | 0–0, 3–4 pen. | | |

== UEFA Europa Conference League ==
Match details
| Round | Date | Opponents | Venue | Result | Score | Scorers | Ref. |
|---|---|---|---|---|---|---|---|
| 1st | 13 July | DAC 1904 | A | L | 1–2 | Kovtalyuk 43' | |
| 1st | 20 July | DAC 1904 | H | W | 2–0 | Gale 33', Santos 78' | |
| 2nd | 27 July | Vorskla | A | L | 1–2 | Kovtalyuk 57' | |
| 2nd | 3 August | Vorskla | H | W | 3–1 | Parulava 45', Kovtalyuk 71', Gale 86' | |
| 3rd | 10 August | APOEL | H | L | 0–2 | | |
| 3rd | 17 August | APOEL | A | L | 0–1 | | |

== Season statistics ==
=== Appearances and goals ===
Note: Flags indicate national team as has been defined under FIFA eligibility rules. Players may hold more than one non-FIFA nationality.

| No. | Pos | Nat | Player | Total | | Erovnuli Liga | | Georgian Cup | | Georgian Super Cup | | UEFA Europa Conference League | |
| No. | Pos | Nat | Player | Apps | Goals | Apps | Goals | Apps | Goals | Apps | Goals | Apps | Goals |
|---|---|---|---|---|---|---|---|---|---|---|---|---|---|
| 1 | GK | (Georgia (country)) GEO | Guram Chikashua | 0 | 0 | 0 | 0 | 0 | 0 | 0 | 0 | 0 | 0 |
| 2 | DF | (Georgia (country)) GEO | Giorgi Gaprindahsvili | 38 | 3 | 35 | 3 | 2 | 0 | 0 | 0 | 1 | 0 |
| 3 | DF | (Georgia (country)) GEO | Zurab Tevzadze | 28 | 1 | 19 | 0 | 2 | 1 | 2 | 0 | 5 | 0 |
| 5 | DF | (Brazil) BRA | Alef Santos | 41 | 1 | 32 | 0 | 2 | 0 | 2 | 0 | 5 | 1 |
| 6 | DF | (Georgia (country)) GEO | Sandro Andronikashvili | 17 | 1 | 11 | 1 | 2 | 0 | 1 | 0 | 3 | 0 |
| 7 | MF | (Senegal) SEN | Honore Gomis | 43 | 9 | 33 | 8 | 2 | 0 | 2 | 1 | 6 | 0 |
| 8 | MF | (Ghana) GHA | Blessing Assamoah | 19 | 0 | 17 | 0 | 1 | 0 | 0 | 0 | 1 | 0 |
| 9 | MF | (Georgia (country)) GEO | Mikheil Sardalishvili | 25 | 4 | 15 | 4 | 2 | 0 | 2 | 0 | 6 | 0 |
| 9 | MF | (Georgia (country)) GEO | Bidzina Makharoblidze | 17 | 1 | 17 | 1 | 0 | 0 | 0 | 0 | 0 | 0 |
| 10 | MF | (Barbados) BRB | Thierry Gale | 27 | 12 | 19 | 10 | 0 | 0 | 2 | 0 | 6 | 2 |
| 11 | MF | (Georgia (country)) GEO | Otar Parulava | 20 | 1 | 12 | 0 | 0 | 0 | 2 | 0 | 6 | 1 |
| 14 | FW | (Georgia (country)) GEO | Sergo Kukhianidze | 22 | 1 | 13 | 0 | 1 | 1 | 2 | 0 | 6 | 0 |
| 16 | GK | (Georgia (country)) GEO | Giorgi Odikadze | 0 | 0 | 0 | 0 | 0 | 0 | 0 | 0 | 0 | 0 |
| 17 | FW | (Georgia (country)) GEO | Giorgi Tsetskhladze | 13 | 1 | 13 | 1 | 0 | 0 | 0 | 0 | 0 | 0 |
| 17 | MF | (Georgia (country)) GEO | Luka Chaganava | 11 | 0 | 9 | 0 | 2 | 0 | 0 | 0 | 0 | 0 |
| 19 | FW | (South Africa) RSA | Bantu Mzwakali | 18 | 1 | 9 | 1 | 2 | 0 | 2 | 0 | 5 | 0 |
| 20 | MF | (Georgia (country)) GEO | Nika Gagnidze | 28 | 6 | 27 | 6 | 1 | 0 | 0 | 0 | 0 | 0 |
| 21 | GK | (Ukraine) UKR | Yevhen Kucherenko | 46 | 0 | 36 | 0 | 2 | 0 | 2 | 0 | 6 | 0 |
| 22 | FW | (Ukraine) UKR | Mykola Kovtalyuk | 37 | 13 | 28 | 10 | 1 | 0 | 2 | 0 | 6 | 3 |
| 23 | MF | (Brazil) BRA | Jean Victor | 41 | 2 | 31 | 2 | 2 | 0 | 2 | 0 | 6 | 0 |
| 24 | DF | (Georgia (country)) GEO | Malkhaz Gagoshidze | 4 | 0 | 4 | 0 | 0 | 0 | 0 | 0 | 0 | 0 |
| 25 | DF | (Brazil) BRA | Wanderson Silva | 46 | 2 | 36 | 2 | 2 | 0 | 2 | 0 | 6 | 0 |
| 26 | DF | (Georgia (country)) GEO | Tornike Dzotsenidze | 35 | 1 | 26 | 1 | 1 | 0 | 2 | 0 | 6 | 0 |
| 30 | DF | (Georgia (country)) GEO | Revaz Chiteishvili | 43 | 1 | 33 | 1 | 2 | 0 | 2 | 0 | 6 | 0 |
| 33 | DF | (Republic of the Congo) CGO | Ramaric Etou | 39 | 3 | 33 | 3 | 1 | 0 | 2 | 0 | 3 | 0 |
