= Papuna Mosemgvdlishvili =

Georgian footballer

Personal information
- Date of birth: 27 April 1994 (age 32)
- Place of birth: Georgia
- Height: 1.93 m (6 ft 4 in)
- Position: Defender

Youth career
- Sasco Tbilisi

Senior career*
Years	Team	Apps	(Gls)
2012–2014	Sasco Tbilisi	11	(0)
2014	→ Sasco Tbilisi II	5	(0)
2014–2015	Sioni Bolnisi	12	(0)
2016	Slavia Mozyr	17	(3)
2017	Gomel	0	(0)
2017	Telavi		
2018	Merani Martvili	11	(0)
2019	Tskhinvali	6	(0)
2019–2020	Zugdidi	34	(4)
2021	FC Tbilisi City		
2022	Borjomi		
- * Club domestic league appearances and goals as of 31 December 2020

Papuna Mosemgvdlishvili (Georgian: პაპუნა მოსემღვდლიშვილი; born 27 April 1994) is a Georgian professional footballer.
