= Anupam Sarkar =

Indian footballer (born 1985)

Personal information
- Full name: Anupam Sarkar
- Date of birth: 26 April 1985 (age 41)
- Place of birth: Gangnapur, India
- Height: 1.74 m (5 ft 8 1/2 in)
- Position: Full back

Team information
- Current team: Mohammedan

Senior career*
Years	Team	Apps	(Gls)
2004–2009	East Bengal		
2009–2010	Mohammedan		
2011–2012	Mohun Bagan		
2012–2014	Prayag United	27	(0)
2014	Pune City	6	(0)
2015	→ Adeli Batumi (loan)	4	(0)
2016	Mohammedan		

International career^{‡}
2003–2004	India U19		
2006	India U23		
2006	India	3	(0)
- * Club domestic league appearances and goals as of 2 August 2016 (UTC) ‡ National team caps and goals as of 18:30, 16 February 2015 (UTC)

Anupam Sarkar (born 26 April 1985) is an Indian professional footballer who plays as a defender for Mohammedan of the Calcutta Football League.

== Club career ==
Anupam began his professional football career with East Bengal in 2004. He was also the captain of the West Bengal football team, that represents the state of West Bengal in the National Football Championship (Santosh Trophy). He won the 2010 edition with his team. He also played for East Bengal FC and Mohammedan Sporting.

In 2012, Sarkar signed with Prayag United, managed by Dutchman Eelco Schattorie. In I-League, they achieved a massive 10–1 victory over newly promoted United Sikkim. He won his first and only cup for the side on 20 March 2013 when Prayag United defeated East Bengal in the IFA Shield final 1–0 through a goal by Ranti Martins. The following season in the I-League, they thrashed Air India FC by 5–1 margin, and eventually finished the 2012–13 campaign leading Prayag United to a fourth-place finish with 44 points.

On 17 February 2015, Sarkar joined Georgian Erovnuli Liga 2 side FC Adeli Batumi on loan for four months.

When I got to know from FC Pune City that Anupam was available, I did not hesitate to share it with my President. I am convinced he will do a good job here. Every player, no matter the age, continues to learn every day if he has the right people around him. The Indian Super League, and all the clubs participating in it, did bring Indian football on a right track. The better the players are, the better the league is. Indian fans deserve that. FC Adeli and myself are pleased to give a hand in that direction and wish Anupam all the very best in Georgia.

— Philippe De Ridder, Technical Director and Manager of FC Adeli Batumi, on Anupam's arrival in Georgia.

Sarkar made his FC Adeli debut in a 6–0 win over FC STU Tbilisi on 21 March 2015. This appearance allowed Sarkar to join a select group of Indian footballers who have played abroad.

On 2 August 2016, it was announced that Sarkar would play for Mohammedan of the Calcutta Football League. Later on 1 October, he retired.

== International career ==
Sarkar made his senior international debut for India at the 2007 AFC Asian Cup qualifying round in Group-A on 16 August 2006 against Saudi Arabia in their 3–0 defeat.

== Honours ==
East Bengal U19

- National Football League U-19: 2001

Prayag United

- IFA Shield: 2013

== See also ==
- List of Indian football players in foreign leagues
