= Chelebadze =

Chelebadze (Georgian: ჩელებაძე) is a Georgian surname. Notable people with the surname include:

- Giorgi Chelebadze (born 1992), Georgian footballer
- Revaz Chelebadze (born 1955), Georgian footballer
