= Giorgi Shashiashvili =

Georgian footballer (born 1979)

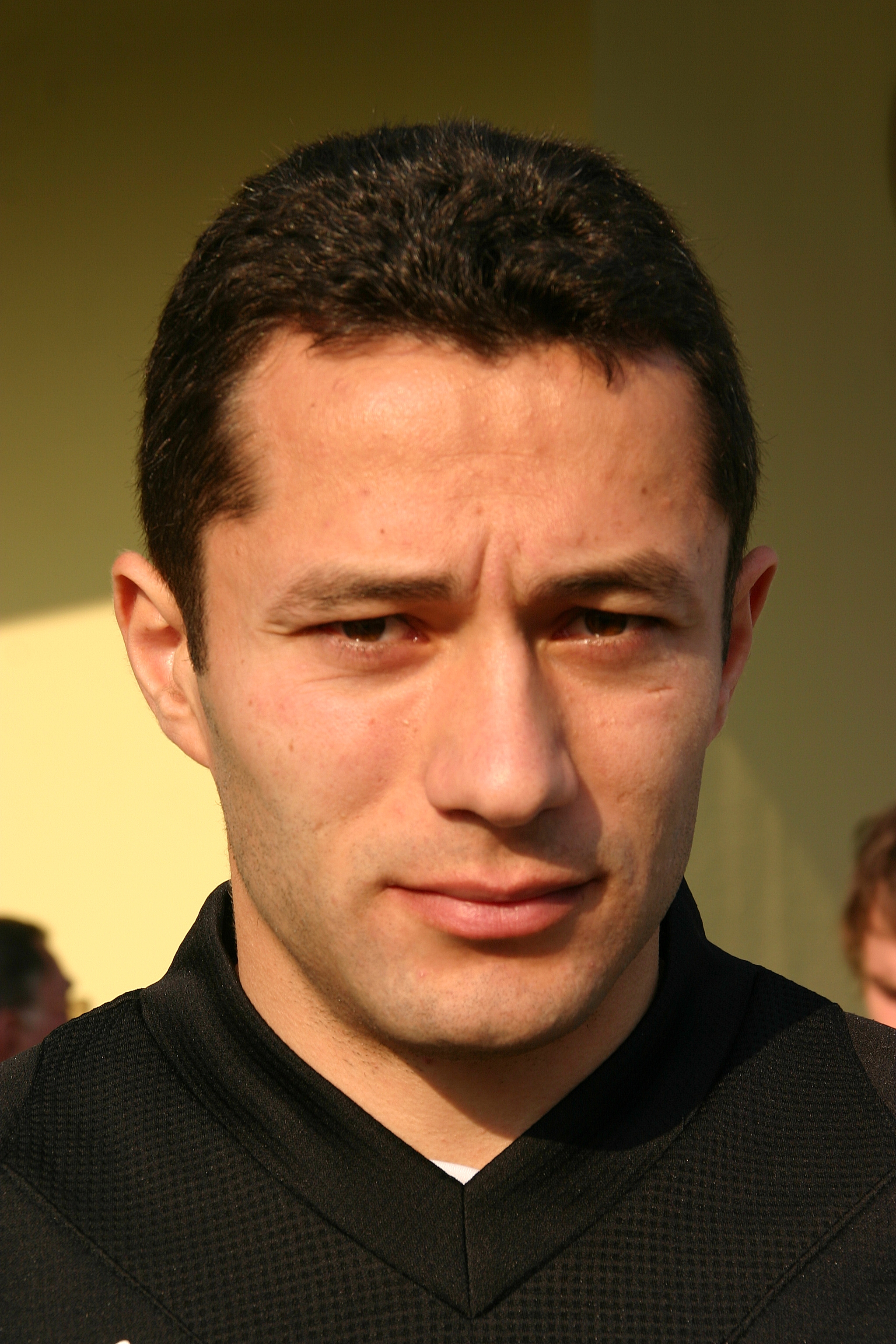
- Shashiashvili with Sturm Graz

Personal information
- Date of birth: 1 September 1979 (age 47)
- Place of birth: Tbilisi, Soviet Union
- Height: 1.85 m (6 ft 1 in)
- Position: Defender

Senior career*
Years	Team	Apps	(Gls)
1996–2005	Dinamo Tbilisi	126	(3)
1998–1999	→ TSU Tbilisi (loan)	11	(0)
2005	Alania Vladikavkaz	7	(0)
2006	Dinamo Tbilisi	13	(2)
2006–2007	Chornomorets Odesa	9	(0)
2007–2009	Sturm Graz	64	(0)
2009–2012	Ergotelis	67	(3)
2012	Dila Gori	17	(0)
2013	Dinamo Tbilisi	9	(2)
Total		323	(10)

International career
1999–2001	Georgia U21	11	(0)
2001–2010	Georgia	30	(1)

Managerial career
- 2017: Shukura Kobuleti
- 2018: Dila Gori (assistant)
- 2018: Dila Gori
- 2019−2021: Shukura Kobuleti
- 2022–2023: Samtredia
- * Club domestic league appearances and goals

Giorgi Shashiashvili (Georgian: გიორგი შაშიაშვილი; born 1 September 1979) is a Georgian football coach and a former player who most recently Shashiashvili was the head coach of Erovnuli Liga club Samtredia. A central defender who also played as a right back, he played for the Georgia national team at International level, making 30 appearances and scoring once.

== Playing career ==
Shashiashvili was a member of six clubs with most of his time spent in Dinamo Tbilisi. For his third and final tenure he joined this club in early 2013 when Shashiashvili won all three domestic competitions.

He was regularly called up to the Georgia national team. On 11 October 2006, he scored the equalizer in a 3–1 loss to Italy in a Euro 2008 qualifying game.

== Managerial career ==
After his retirement in 2013 Shashiashvili for three years worked at Dinamo Tbilisi academy with U14 and U19 teams. In 2017, Shukura Kobuleti became the first club that invited him as a manager.

During his second spell at Shukura, in 2020 Shashiashvili guided the team to a Liga 2 title and promotion to the first tier.

In February 2022, he was appointed at Samtredia, where he achieved another success the same year. The team finished third and advanced into Erovnuli Liga via play-offs.

== Honours ==
=== Player ===
Dinamo Tbilisi

- Erovnuli Liga: 2012–13
- David Kipiani Cup: 2012–13
- Super Cup runner-up: 2013–14

=== Manager ===
Shukura Kobuleti

- Erovnuli Liga 2: 2020
