= 2010–11 Pirveli Liga =

2010–11 Pirveli Liga was the 22nd season of the Georgian Pirveli Liga. The season began on 29 August 2010 and finished on 24 May 2011.

== Teams ==
Team	Condition 2010-11	Region	Stadium	Capacity
Gagra	Umaglesi Liga	Abkhazia	Merani Stadium	6,000
Lokomotivi Tbilisi	Umaglesi Liga	Tbilisi	Mikheil Meskhi Stadium	24,680
Dinamo Batumi	3	Adjara	Tsentral Stadium (Batumi)	15,000
Guria Lanchkhuti	4	Guria	Evgrapi Shevardnadze Stadium	8,000
Merani Martvili	5	Samegrelo-Zemo Svaneti	Municipal Stadium (Martvili)	2 000
Chikhura Sachkhere	6	Imereti	Tsentral Stadium (Sachkhere)	2,000
Norchi Dinamoeli Tbilisi	8	Tbilisi	Sport-kompleksi Shatili	2,000
Mertskhali Ozurgeti	9	Guria	Megobroba Stadium	3,500
Kolkheti Khobi	10	Samegrelo	Tsentral Stadium (Khobi)	12,000
Chiatura Sachkhere	11	Imereti	Temur Maghradze Stadium	11,700
Meshakhte Tkibuli	12	Imereti	Vladimer Bochorishvili Stadium	11,700
Imereti Khoni	Meore Liga	Imereti	Tsentral Stadium (Khoni)	2,000
Chkherimela Kharagauli	Meore Liga	Imereti	Kharagauli Stadium	6,000
Samgurali Tskaltubo	Meore Liga	Imereti	26 May Stadium	12,000
Dila Gori	Meore Liga	Shida Kartli	Tengiz Burjanadze Stadium	8,300
Adeli Batumi	Meore Liga	Adjara	Tsentral Stadium (Batumi)	4,000
Skuri Tsalenjikha	Meore Liga	Samegrelo-Zemo Svaneti	Sasha Kvaratskhelia Stadium	4,000

== Results ==
Pos	Team	Pld	W	D	L	GF	GA	GD	Pts	Promotion or qualification
1	Gagra (C, P)	32	23	6	3	73	19	+54	75	Europa League qualifying and promotion to Umaglesi Liga (Note: Gagra qualified for the Europa League second qualifying round by winning the 2010–11 Georgian Cup.)
2	Merani Martvili (P)	32	22	7	3	60	15	+45	73	Promotion to Umaglesi Liga
3	Dila Gori (P)	32	20	9	3	58	21	+37	69	Qualification for Promotion play-offs
4	Chikhura	32	20	6	6	58	25	+33	66	Qualification for Promotion play-offs
5	Dinamo Batumi	32	18	9	5	66	18	+48	63	
6	Kolkheti Khobi	32	12	10	10	28	34	−6	46	
7	Guria	32	14	4	14	50	59	−9	46	
8	Imereti	32	11	4	17	36	43	−7	37	
9	Chkherimela	32	7	14	11	35	45	−10	35	
10	Meshakhte	32	10	5	17	32	48	−16	35	
11	Norchi Dinamoeli	32	10	5	17	39	58	−19	35	
12	Adeli	32	10	2	20	38	54	−16	32	
13	Mertskhali	32	8	8	16	41	68	−27	32	
14	Samgurali	32	8	6	18	38	64	−26	30	
15	Skuri	32	8	5	19	28	52	−24	29	
16	Chiatura	32	8	5	19	28	69	−41	29	
17	Lokomotivi	32	7	7	18	30	46	−16	28	

Source: Soccerway
Rules for classification: 1) points; 2) goal difference; 3) number of goals scored.
(C) Champions; (P) Promoted

== See also ==
- 2010–11 Umaglesi Liga
- 2010–11 Georgian Cup
