= David Odikadze =

Georgian footballer

Personal information
- Full name: Davit Odikadze
- Date of birth: 14 April 1981 (age 45)
- Place of birth: Tbilisi, Georgia
- Height: 1.84 m (6 ft 0 in)
- Position: Right back

Youth career
- 1996–1997: STU Tbilisi
- 1998: Baia Kaski
- 1998–1999: Universiti-Iberia

Senior career*
Years	Team	Apps	(Gls)
1996–1997	STU Tbilisi	12	(0)
1998	Baia Kaski	7	(0)
1998–1999	Universiti-Iberia	19	(2)
1999–2001	Iberia Samtredia	17	(1)
2001	Guria Lanchkhuti	16	(0)
2002	Kolkheti Poti	11	(1)
2002–2003	ISOline	24	(0)
2003–2004	FC Tbilisi	16	(10)
2004–2008	Dinamo Tbilisi	75	(11)
2009	Győri ETO	8	(0)
2009–2011	Inter Baku	53	(5)
2011–2013	Dinamo Tbilisi	32	(1)
2012–2013	→ Chikhura Sachkhere (loan)	28	(8)
2014–2015	Chikhura Sachkhere	37	(3)
2015	Torpedo	8	(1)
2015–2016	Sapovnela	25	(0)
2018–2021	Shevardeni 1906	71	(10)

International career^{‡}
2005–2009	Georgia	14	(0)
- * Club domestic league appearances and goals as of 28 October 2014 ‡ National team caps and goals as of 1 December 2009

David Odikadze (Georgian: დავით ოდიკაძე; born 14 April 1981) is a retired Georgian football player who played as a right-sided defender and right midfielder.

Odikadze is the two-time winner of Umaglesi Liga with Dinamo Tbilisi. He has also secured the Azerbaijan Premier League, Georgian Cup and Georgian Super Cup titles.

== Career ==
Odikadze started his career at STU in 1996. He spent most years at Dinamo Tbilisi and Chikhura whom he captained. Odikadze announced his retirement in April 2021 at age 39.

Overall, during his 25 year-long career Odikadze took part in 472 matches in Georgian football leagues, scoring 76 goals.

== International ==
Odikadze made his debut for Georgia in a friendly 1–0 win over Lithuania on 9 February 2005. After making three more appearance the same year, he was not called up until May 2008. Odikadze featured in seven matches of 2010 FIFA World Cup qualifiers.

== After retirement ==
Two years after his retirement, Odikadze announced the creation of a football academy for children aged 6–13.
