= Sergo Kukhianidze =

Georgian association footballer (born 1999)

Personal information
- Date of birth: 23 April 1999 (age 27)
- Place of birth: Kutaisi, Georgia
- Height: 1.70 m (5 ft 7 in)
- Position: Forward

Team information
- Current team: Merani Martvili
- Number: 24

Youth career
- Torpedo Kutaisi

Senior career*
Years	Team	Apps	(Gls)
2017–2018	Torpedo Kutaisi	1	(0)
2018	→ Merani Martvili (loan)	7	(0)
2019–2023	Samgurali	110	(33)
2023–2024	Dila	13	(0)
2024	Narva Trans	30	(11)
2025	Marsaxlokk	7	(0)
2025	Gareji	20	(2)
2026	Sioni	15	(3)
2026–	Mrani Martvili	3	(0)

International career
2020	Georgia U21	4	(0)
2021	Georgia	1	(0)
- * Club domestic league appearances and goals as of 31 August 2026

Sergo Kukhianidze (Georgian: სერგო კუხიანიძე; born 23 April 1999) is a Georgian footballer who plays as a forward for 2nd division club Merani Martvili.

He has also played for the national youth and senior teams.

== Club career ==
Born in Kutaisi, Kukhianidze joined Martve Kutaisi at the age of nine. Later he moved to Torpedo and initially played in youth and reserve teams. Kukhianidze made his debut on 13 May 2017 in a 3–0 win over Kolkheti Poti as a substitute. He was a squad member of the team which won Erovnuli Liga in its inaugurating 2017 season.

After half a season spent at Liga 2 side Merani Martvili on loan, Kukhianidze joined Samgurali in the 3rd division and became the league top scorer with 16 goals. He bagged a brace in a 9–0 aggregate play-off victory over Kolkheti Poti, which resulted in promotion to the 2nd tier.

Kukhianidze maintained his status as the main goalscorer for two more years at Samgurali. The 2021 season turned out to be rewarding. Eventually, with 11 goals, he ended up 4th among the Erovnuli Liga goalscorers and received a nomination for the best forward of the season.

In May 2023, he left Samgurali and signed with Dila Gori on a two-year deal. After two months he made a debut in European competitions, taking part in Dila's all six UEFA Conference League matches this season.

On 6 February 2024, Kukhianidze signed his first contract with a foreign club. Narva Trans announced his transfer on a one-year contract. In his third match for the team, Kukhianidze bagged a brace in a 2–0 win over Nomme United on 30 March. During this season he netted 11 times and provided three assists, becoming a shared top scorer of the team. Besides, he was named three times in the symbolic league teams. On 13 November 2024, Trans announced that the player would leave the club.

In January 2025, Kukhianidze joined the Maltese side Marsaxlokk on a six-month deal. Four months later, he returned to Georgia and made his debut as a late substitute for Gareji in a 2–1 win over Samgurali.

== International career ==
In May 2021, Georgia national team head coach Willy Sagnol named him in the squad for friendlies against Romania and Netherlands. He made his debut on 6 June in a 3–0 defeat to Netherlands.

== Career statistics ==
=== Club ===
As of match played 10 August 2026

Appearances and goals by club, season and competition
Club	Season	League			National cup		Continental		Other		Total	
Club	Season	Division	Apps	Goals	Apps	Goals	Apps	Goals	Apps	Goals	Apps	Goals
Torpedo Kutaisi	2017	Erovnuli Liga	1	0	–		–		–		1	0
Merani Martvili (loan)	2018	Erovnuli Liga 2	7	0	–		–		–		7	0
Samgurali	2019	Liga 3	34	14	–		–		2 (Note: Appearances in play-offs)	2	36	16
Samgurali	2020	Erovnuli Liga 2	17	7	4	3	–		2	2	23	12
Samgurali	2021	Erovnuli Liga	31	11	3	0	–		–		34	11
Samgurali	2022	Erovnuli Liga	22	0	–		–		–		22	0
Samgurali	2023	Erovnuli Liga	6	1	–		–		–		6	1
Samgurali	Total		110	33	7	3	0	0	4	4	121	40
Dila Gori	2023	Erovnuli Liga	13	0	1	1	6 (Note: Appearances in UEFA Conference League)	0	2 (Note: Appearances in Georgian Super Cup)	0	22	1
Narva Trans	2024	Meistriliiga	30	11	2	3	–		1 (Note: Appearances in Estonian Super Cup)	1	33	15
Marsaxlokk	2024–25	Maltese Premier League	7	0	–		–		–		7	0
Gareji	2025	Erovnuli Liga	20	2	–		–		–		20	2
Sioni	2026	Erovnuli Liga 2	15	3	–		–		–		15	3
Merani Martvili	2026	Erovnuli Liga 2	3	0	–		–		–		3	0
Career total			206	49	10	7	6	0	7	5	229	61

=== International ===
As of 6 June 2021

Appearances and goals by national team and year
National team	Year	Apps	Goals
Georgia	2021	1	0
Total		1	0

== Honours ==
Torpedo Kutaisi

- Erovnuli Liga (1): 2017
