= FC Norchi Dinamoeli =

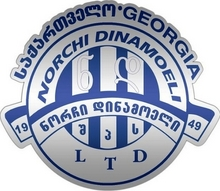
- Full name: Football Club Norchi Dinamoeli
- Nickname: Norchi Dinamoeli
- Founded: 1949; 77 years ago
- Dissolved: 2018; 8 years ago
- Ground: Sport-kompleksi Shatili; Tbilisi, Georgia
- Capacity: 2000
- Chairman: Beno Labartkava
- Manager: Zorbeg Ebralidze
- League: Erovnuli Liga 2
- 2018: 5th
Home colours	Away colours

FC Norchi Dinamoeli (Georgian: საფეხბურთო კლუბი ნორჩი დინამოელი) was a Georgian football club based in Tbilisi. They played in Erovnuli Liga 2 before being dissolved in 2018.

== History ==
Football School Norchi Dinamoeli was organized by FC Dinamo Tbilisi in 1949, The school's primary purpose was to prepare young talented players for the club. FC Norchi Dinamoeli became the winner of the Pirveli Liga in 1999 and promoted to Umaglesi Liga, where he participated in club FC Tbilisi behalf. First season at the club was relegated from a Umaglesi Liga. The following season the Club joined to FC Merani-91 Tbilisi and participating as a Norchi Dinamo Merani-B. In 2002, FC Merani has faced financial problems due to the collapse of the team and relegation from the Umaglesi Liga. Since 2003, FC Norchi Dinamoeli played in the Meore Liga. The team won the Meore Liga in 2006 and took the lead in the Pirveli Liga. The club competes in the Pirveli Liga.

== Seasons ==
Season	League	Pos.	Pl.	W	D	L	GF	GA	P	Cup	Notes	Manager
1995–96	Pirveli Liga	2	36	26	3	7	99	27	81	Not Played		
1996–97	Pirveli Liga, East Group	5	38	20	10	8	95	33	70	Not Played		
1998–99	Pirveli Liga, East, B zone	1	26	24	0	2	79	17	72	Not Played	Promoted	
1999-00	Umaglesi Liga	14	14	3	2	9	12	26	25	Round of 8	Relegated	
2001–02	Pirveli Liga	11	22	5	1	16	17	47	16	Not Played	Relegated	
2005–06	Meore Liga East.	1	30	22	6	2	82	12	72	Not Played	Promoted	
2006–07	Pirveli Liga	8	34	16	4	14	50	49	52	Round of 16		
2007–08	Pirveli Liga	10	27	1	7	19	20	70	10	Round of 16		
2008–09	Pirveli Liga	10	30	3	7	20	28	72	16	Round of 32		
2009–10	Pirveli Liga	8	28	9	5	14	38	57	32	Round of 32		Valeri Gagua
2010–11	Pirveli Liga	10	32	10	5	17	39	58	35	Round of 32		Valeri Gagua
2011–12	Pirveli Liga	1 (Relegetion Group B)	19	14	7	4	48	28	44	Round of 32		Zorbeg Ebralidze

== Current squad ==
Note: Flags indicate national team as defined under FIFA eligibility rules; some limited exceptions apply. Players may hold more than one non-FIFA nationality.

No.	Pos.	Nation	Player
—	GK	CMR	Andre Nonos
—	DF	GEO	Giorgi Berishvili
—	DF	GEO	Goderdzi Machaidze
—	DF	GEO	Zaur Kardava
—	DF	GEO	Giorgi Taniashvili
—	DF	IDN	Rafael Andika
—	DF	GEO	Goga Kvaraia
—	DF	GEO	Levan Chagelishvili
—	DF	GEO	Goga Chubinidze
—	DF	GEO	Giorgi Taniashvili
—	MF	GEO	Giorgi Chikvaidze

No.	Pos.	Nation	Player
—	MF	GEO	Aleksi Khvtisavrishvili
—	MF	GEO	Aleksandre Shengelia
—	MF	GEO	Zaur Dzagania
—	MF	GEO	Ioseb Chakhvashvili
—	MF	GEO	Levan Iashvili
—	MF	GEO	Beka Shubitidze
—	MF	GEO	Giorgi Diasamidze
—	FW	GEO	Ilia Kavtaradze
—	FW	GEO	Mikheil Khokerashvili
—	FW	GEO	Levan Labartkava

== Honours ==
- Pirveli Liga
  - Champion 1998–99
  - Second place 1995–96
- Meore Liga
  - Champion 1994–1995 (East Zone)
  - Champion 1996–1997 (East Zone) (Norchi Dinamoeli-2)
  - Champion 1998–1999 (East Zone) (Norchi Dinamoeli-2)
  - Champion 2002–2003 (East Zone)
  - Champion 2005–2006 (East Zone)
