= Zorbeg Ebralidze =

Georgian footballer and coach

Personal information
- Full name: Zorbeg Kapitonovich Ebralidze
- Date of birth: 20 September 1944 (age 82)
- Place of birth: Lanchkhuti, USSR
- Height: 1.78 m (5 ft 10 in)
- Position: Defender

Youth career
- 1960–1965: FC Guria Lanchkhuti

Senior career*
Years	Team	Apps	(Gls)
1965–1970	FC Torpedo Kutaisi	139	(1)
1971–1976	FC Dinamo Tbilisi	131	(5)
- * Club domestic league appearances and goals

Zorbeg Ebralidze (Georgian: ზორბეგ ებრალიძე) (born 20 September 1944), is a former Georgian football defender and coach.

Ebralidze was born in Lanchkhuti, Georgian SSR. He played for FC Dinamo Tbilisi and Soviet Union National Team. He also played for a year for FC Guria Lanchkhuti and FC Torpedo Kutaisi. Among his successes as a player were helping to win the Soviet Cup FC Dinamo Tbilisi in 1976.

Now Zorbeg Ebralidze coached FC Norchi Dinamoeli.

== Honours ==
- Soviet Cup Champion: 1976
- Soviet Top League Bronze prize winner: 1978
