= 2005–06 Meore Liga =

In the 2005–06 season of the Meore Liga (now Liga 3), a third-tier football league in Georgia, the FC Norchi Dinamo Tbilisi team finished champions of the East Zone.

== Meore Liga - East Zone ==
=== Table ===
Pos	Team	Pld	W	D	L	GF	GA	GD	Pts	Promotion (Note: 2 more losses than wins; total goal difference -6; presumably one match awarded 0-3 against both clubs)
1	Norchi Dinamoeli (C, P)	30	22	6	2	81	12	+69	72	Promotion to Pirveli Liga
2	Ameri-3 Tbilisi	30	22	5	3	70	18	+52	71	
3	OMC Tbilisi	30	21	5	4	73	21	+52	68	
4	Norchi Dinamoeli-2	29	20	3	6	57	28	+29	63	
5	FC Ochamchire	30	16	4	10	53	32	+21	52	
6	Tskhumi Sokhumi	30	16	3	11	62	40	+22	51	
7	Amirani Ochamchire	30	12	5	13	51	49	+2	41	
8	Gareji Sagarejo	30	11	7	12	36	29	+7	40	
9	Samgori Gardabani	29	12	3	14	60	64	−4	39	
10	Kakheti-2 Telavi	30	11	5	14	48	49	−1	38	
11	Maudi Tbilisi	30	9	7	14	38	53	−15	34	
12	Khalibi Rustavi	30	9	4	17	30	61	−31	31	
13	Algeti Marneuli	30	7	6	17	40	82	−42	27	
14	Alazani Gurjaani	30	7	3	20	26	59	−33	24	
15	Duruji Kvareli	30	4	6	20	28	83	−55	18	
16	Ertoba Akhmeta	30	1	4	25	24	103	−79	7	

Source: rsssf.com
Rules for classification: (1) points (2) Number of wins (3) Head-to-Head record
(C) Champions; (P) Promoted
