= Zurab Museliani =

Georgian footballer (born 1999)

Personal information
- Full name: Zurab Museliani
- Date of birth: 17 September 1999 (age 27)
- Place of birth: Georgia
- Height: 1.78 m (5 ft 10 in)
- Position: Striker

Team information
- Current team: Dila
- Number: 21

Senior career*
Years	Team	Apps	(Gls)
2017–2020	WIT Georgia	62	(18)
2021–2022	Shukura	63	(18)
2023	Gagra	31	(17)
2024	Gyeongnam	7	(0)
2024	Velež	6	(1)
2025	Enosis	36	(5)
2026–	Dila	6	(1)
- * Club domestic league appearances and goals as of 7 May 2026

Zurab Museliani (Georgian: ზურაბ მუსელიანი; born 17 September 1999) is a Georgian professional footballer who plays as a striker for Erovnuli Liga club Dila.

== Early life ==
Museliani lived in Spain as a child. He moved back with his family to Georgia at the age of twelve.

== Career ==
Museliani started his career with 2nd league Georgian side WIT Georgia in 2017. As the club secured promotion the next season, on 3 March 2019 he made a debut in the top national division and scored the only goal of the match against Dila. This year Museliani took part in all league games save for one, which he had to miss out on due to suspension. With the club back in the second league in 2020, Museliani finished as the best striker of his team among the top five goalscorers of the league.

In 2021, Museliani signed for Shukura. With 14 goals scored the next year in the 2nd division, he became the team's top goalscorer again.

In 2023, he joined Gagra. A very special day was awaiting him on the final day of this season on 2 December when Museliani netted seven times against his former club Shukura. With such achievement Museliani became Georgia's second top-league player after Gia Jishkariani and the first Erovnuli Liga footballer. Eventually, he ended up as a joint top scorer of the 2023 Erovnuli Liga with seventeen goals.

In early 2024, he signed for South Korean side Gyeongnam FC, although after a half season moved to Bosnian club Velež.

On 6 January 2025, Cypriot First Division side Enosis Neon Paralimni announced the signing of Museliani.

A year later, he moved to the 2025 Georgian Cup holders Dila.

== Statistics ==
As of match played 11 April 2026

Appearances and goals by club, season and competition
Club	Season	League			National cup		Continental		Other		Total	
Club	Season	Division	Apps	Goals	Apps	Goals	Apps	Goals	Apps	Goals	Apps	Goals
WIT Georgia	2017	Erovnuli Liga 2	0	0	–		–		–		0	0
WIT Georgia	2018	Erovnuli Liga 2	11	4	1	0	–		1 (Note: Appearances in Erovnuli Liga playoffs)	0	13	4
WIT Georgia	2019	Erovnuli Liga	35	6	1	0	–		–		36	6
WIT Georgia	2020	Erovnuli Liga 2	16	8	1	0	–		2	0	19	8
WIT Georgia	Total		62	18	3	0	0	0	3	0	68	18
Shukura	2021	Erovnuli Liga	34	4	3	0	–		2	0	39	4
Shukura	2022	Erovnuli Liga 2	29	14	3	1	–		–		32	15
Shukura	Total		63	18	6	1	0	0	2	0	71	19
Gagra	2023	Erovnuli Liga	31	17	1	0	–		–		32	17
Gyeongnam	2024	K League 2	7	0	–		–		–		7	0
Velež	2024/25	Bosnian PL	6	1	–		–		–		6	1
Enosis	2024–25	Cypriot First Division	15	4	1	0	–		–		16	4
Enosis	2025–26	Cypriot First Division	21	1	2	2	–		–		23	3
Enosis	Total		36	5	3	2	0	0	0	0	39	7
Dila	2026	Erovnuli Liga	6	1	–		–		–		6	1
Career total			208	60	19	3	0	0	5	0	232	63

== Style of play ==
Museliani mainly operates as a striker. He is known for his dribbling ability and speed.
