= Mikheil Sardalishvili =

Georgian association football player (born 1992)

Personal information
- Date of birth: 17 September 1992 (age 34)
- Place of birth: Georgia
- Height: 1.73 m (5 ft 8 in)
- Position: Midfielder

Senior career*
| Years | Team | Apps | (Gls) |
| 2011–2015 | Zestaponi | 41 | (5) |
| 2011–2012 | → Gagra (loan) | 3 | (1) |
| 2015–2017 | Chikhura | 86 | (19) |
| 2018 | Torpedo Kutaisi | 11 | (0) |
| 2018–2019 | Chikhura | 52 | (12) |
| 2020 | Merani Tbilisi | 15 | (0) |
| 2021–2023 | Shukura | 73 | (20) |
| 2023 | Dila | 15 | (4) |
| 2024– | Gareji | 28 | (4) |
- * Club domestic league appearances and goals as of 17 December 2024

Mikheil "Mishiko" Sardalishvili (Georgian: მიხეილ სარდალიშვილი; born 17 September 1992) is a Georgian footballer who most recently played as a midfielder for Erovnuli Liga 2 club Gareji.

He won the Georgian Cup in 2017. Also, he is the two-time winner of the Georgian Super Cup.

== Career ==
Sardalishvili started his professional career at Zestaponi, one of the strongest domestic clubs in the early 2010s. The Super Cup was the first title he won after a 3–1 victory over Gagra in 2012.

After three seasons he moved to rapidly ascending club Chikhura. Winning the Georgian Cup in December 2017 turned out to be the most memorable event during his six-year tenure at Chikhura.

Shortly he moved to reigning champions Torpedo Kutaisi and in his first game lifted his second Super Cup title.

On 11 July 2019, Sardalishvili netted his first European goal in a UEFA Europa League 2–1 away win at Fola Esch.

In early 2020, he joined newly promoted Merani Tbilisi on a year-long deal.

He spent the next two and a half years at Shukura Kobuleti, who were drifting between the first and second divisions. Sardalishvili completed his first season as the team's top scorer. In 2022, he helped the club gain promotion back to the Erovnuli Liga, although in light of financial woes the sides decided to part ways next summer.

In June 2023, Sardalishvili signed a contract with Dila Gori, but at the end of this season he left the club and joined Liga 2 side Gareji. The next year, he became the league champion as the club earned their first ever promotion to the top tier.

== Statistics ==
=== Club ===
As of match played 8 December 2024

Appearances and goals by club, season and competition
| Club | Season | League | | | National cup | | Continental | | Other | | Total | |
| Club | Season | Division | Apps | Goals | Apps | Goals | Apps | Goals | Apps | Goals | Apps | Goals |
|---|---|---|---|---|---|---|---|---|---|---|---|---|
| Zestaponi | 2011–12 | Umaglesi Liga | 9 | 1 | 3 | 0 | – | | – | | 12 | 1 |
| Zestaponi | 2012–13 | Umaglesi Liga | 8 | 2 | – | | – | | – | | 8 | 2 |
| Zestaponi | 2013–14 | Umaglesi Liga | 10 | 0 | 3 | 1 | – | | – | | 13 | 1 |
| Zestaponi | 2014–15 | Umaglesi Liga | 14 | 2 | 2 | 0 | – | | – | | 16 | 2 |
| Zestaponi | Total | | 41 | 5 | 8 | 1 | 0 | 0 | 0 | 0 | 49 | 6 |
| Gagra (loan) | 2011–12 | Umaglesi Liga | 17 | 3 | 2 | 0 | – | | 1 (Note: Appearances in Georgian Super Cup) | 0 | 20 | 3 |
| Chikhura | 2014–15 | Umaglesi/ Erovnuli Liga | 15 | 2 | 3 | 0 | – | | – | | 18 | 2 |
| Chikhura | 2015–16 | Umaglesi/ Erovnuli Liga | 25 | 9 | 5 | 3 | – | | – | | 30 | 12 |
| Chikhura | 2016 | Umaglesi/ Erovnuli Liga | 11 | 0 | 2 | 0 | – | | – | | 13 | 0 |
| Chikhura | 2017 | Umaglesi/ Erovnuli Liga | 35 | 8 | 5 | 4 | 2 (Note: Appearances in UEFA Conference League) | 0 | – | | 42 | 12 |
| Chikhura | 2018 | Umaglesi/ Erovnuli Liga | 18 | 4 | 1 | 0 | 4 | 0 | – | | 23 | 4 |
| Chikhura | 2019 | Umaglesi/ Erovnuli Liga | 34 | 8 | 1 | 0 | 4 | 2 | – | | 39 | 10 |
| Chikhura | Total | | 138 | 31 | 17 | 7 | 10 | 2 | 0 | 0 | 165 | 40 |
| Torpedo Kutaisi | 2017 | Erovnuli Liga | 11 | 0 | 1 | 0 | – | | 1 | 0 | 13 | 0 |
| Merani Tbilisi | 2020 | Erovnuli Liga | 15 | 0 | 2 | 1 | – | | – | | 17 | 1 |
| Shukura | 2021 | Erovnuli Liga | 30 | 8 | 2 | 0 | – | | 2 (Note: Appearances in Erovnuli Liga playoffs) | 0 | 34 | 8 |
| Shukura | 2022 | Erovnuli Liga 2 | 27 | 6 | 3 | 0 | – | | – | | 30 | 6 |
| Shukura | 2023 | Erovnuli Liga | 16 | 6 | – | | – | | – | | 16 | 6 |
| Shukura | Total | | 73 | 20 | 5 | 0 | 0 | 0 | 2 | 0 | 80 | 20 |
| Dila Gori | 2023 | Erovnuli Liga | 15 | 4 | 2 | 0 | 6 | 0 | – | | 23 | 4 |
| Gareji | 2024 | Erovnuli Liga 2 | 28 | 4 | 3 | 0 | – | | – | | 31 | 4 |
| Career total | | | 338 | 67 | 40 | 9 | 16 | 2 | 4 | 0 | 398 | 78 |

== Honours ==
Zestaponi

- Georgian Super Cup (1): 2012

Chikhura

- Georgian Cup (1): 2017

Torpedo Kutaisi

- Georgian Super Cup (1): 2018

Shukura

- Erovnuli Liga 2 (1): 2022

Gareji

- Erovnuli Liga 2 (1): 2024
