= Luka Asatiani =

Georgian footballer

Personal information
- Date of birth: 22 April 1999 (age 27)
- Place of birth: Tbilisi, Georgia
- Height: 1.88 m (6 ft 2 in)
- Position: Centre-back

Youth career
- –2016: 35-e Skola
- 2016–2018: Jagiellonia Białystok

Senior career*
Years	Team	Apps	(Gls)
2014–2016	35-e Skola	28	(2)
2017–2019	Jagiellonia Białystok	0	(0)
2017	→ Wigry Suwałki (loan)	2	(0)
2018–2019	→ Olimpia Zambrów (loan)	3	(0)
2019–2020	Rustavi	1	(0)
2020–2021	Samgurali	16	(0)
2021–2022	Samtredia	23	(0)
2022	Sioni Bolnisi	6	(2)
2023	Shukura	18	(0)

International career
2015	Georgia U16	1	(0)
2015–2016	Georgia U17	6	(0)
2017	Georgia U19	3	(0)
2020	Georgia U21	2	(0)
- * Club domestic league appearances and goals as of 3 December 2023

Luka Asatiani (Georgian: ლუკა ასათიანი; born 22 April 1999) is a Georgian professional footballer who plays as a centre-back.

== Career statistics ==
=== Club ===
As of 8 October 2018.

Club	Season	League			Cup		Continental		Other		Total	
Club	Season	Division	Apps	Goals	Apps	Goals	Apps	Goals	Apps	Goals	Apps	Goals
35-e Skola	2014–15	Liga 3	21	2	0	0	–		0	0	21	2
35-e Skola	2015–16	Liga 3	7	0	0	0	–		0	0	7	0
35-e Skola	Total		28	2	0	0	0	0	0	0	28	2
Jagiellonia Białystok	2017–18	Ekstraklasa	0	0	0	0	–		0	0	0	0
Wigry Suwałki (loan)	2017–18	I liga	2	0	0	0	–		0	0	2	0
Olimpia Zambrów	2018–19	III liga	0	0	0	0	–		0	0	0	0
Career total			30	2	0	0	0	0	0	0	30	2
