= Giorgi Chelebadze =

Georgian professional football player

Personal information
- Date of birth: 1 January 1992 (age 34)
- Place of birth: Kobuleti, Georgia
- Height: 1.85 m (6 ft 1 in)
- Position: Forward

Team information
- Current team: Shukura Kobuleti
- Number: 10

Youth career
- FS 35 Sapekhburto Skola

Senior career*
Years	Team	Apps	(Gls)
2010–2011	Chornomorets Odesa	7	(0)
2011	Fakel Voronezh	2	(0)
2011–2012	Rubin Kazan	0	(0)
2012	Adeli Batumi	13	(6)
2012–2016	Shukura Kobuleti	90	(48)
2016–	Dila Gori	10	(0)
2017–	Shukura Kobuleti	43	(13)

International career
2009	Georgia U17	1	(0)
2009–2010	Georgia U19	7	(2)
- * Club domestic league appearances and goals as of 17 August 2019

Giorgi Chelebadze (Georgian: გიორგი ჩელებაძე; born 1 January 1992) is a Georgian professional football player, currently playing for Shukura Kobuleti.

== Personal life ==
His father, Revaz was also a footballer, playing for FC Dinamo Tbilisi and USSR national football team.
