= FC Shukura Kobuleti =

- Full name: FC Shukura Kobuleti
- Founded: 1968; 58 years ago
- Dissolved: 2024; 2 years ago
- Ground: Chele Arena
- Capacity: 6,000
- League: N/A
- Website: http://fcshukura.ge
Home colours	Away colours

FC Shukura Kobuleti, commonly known as Shukura Kobuleti or simply Shukura, is a defunct Georgian football club from Kobuleti, the second largest city in Adjara.

After the 2023 season, the team was first relegated to Erovnuli Liga 2, the second tier of Georgian football, and later expelled to Liga 4. But they withdrew without playing a single match there.

== History ==
Established in 1968, Shukura played eight seasons in the Soviet third division.

After an independent Georgian league was formed in 1990, the club took part in II league competition before getting promoted to Umaglesi Liga for 1993/94. After one season, though, they lost a relegation battle.

A decade later the team managed to earn another promotion after 2003/04, but facing severe financial problems, Shukura was unable to play in the first tier.

In 2011/12, Shukura won the third division and advanced to II league. They had another successful season in 2013/14, when the club returned to the top flight and also for the first time reached the semifinals of David Kipiani Cup after Umaglesi Liga clubs WIT Georgia and Merani had been eliminated.

In October 2019, Giorgi Shashiashvili took the helm of Shukura and a year later led the club to successful completion of their promotion goal, although after one season the club returned to League 2.

The team came close to the Cup final in 2021. Having initially beaten Dinamo Tbilisi, Shukura was ahead of Samgurali three minutes before the stoppage time, but still lost a dramatic five-goal thriller. In 2022, Shukura sealed the first place in Liga 2 for the third time in a decade and claimed the champion's record-breaking fifth title in the history of the second division. In the same year, development company Alliance Group Holding was confirmed as a majority stakeholder (83%) of the club with its chairman Ayet Kukava taking over the remaining share.

Despite large-scale pre-season changes, Shukura were faced with a turbulent period back in the Erovnuli Liga in 2023. Unable to play at the home ground during the entire season, they were handed a transfer ban at some point and, besides, deducted six points for financial issues. With six matches still to play, Shukura were officially relegated in October. In January 2024, the Football Federation announced that due to Shukura's failure to meet licensing requirements the club would be demoted to the 4th tier. Following this decision, the team was dissolved.

== Seasons ==
Season	Div.	Pos	Notes	Top goalscorer	Cup
2012/13	2nd	3rd of 12	Group B	(Georgia (country)) Giorgi Chelebadze - 13	1/8
2013/14	2nd	1st of 13	Group A, promoted	(Georgia (country)) Giorgi Chelebadze - 22	1/2
2014/15	1st	7th of 16		(Georgia (country)) Giorgi Chelebadze - 7	1/8
2015/16	1st	10th of 16		(Georgia (country)) Elguja Lobjanidze - 7	1/4
2016	1st	5th of 7	White Group	(Georgia (country)) Koba Shalamberidze - 4	1/16
2017	1st	10th of 10	Relegated	(Georgia (country)) Davit Chagelishvili - 8	1/16
2018	2nd	7th of 10		(Georgia (country)) Giorgi Chelebadze - 10	1/4
2019	2nd	6th of 10		(Georgia (country)) Giorgi Kurmashvili - 7	1/16
2020	2nd	1st of 10	Promoted	(Brazil) Jefinho - 11	1/16
2021	1st	9th of 10	Relegated	(Georgia (country)) Mikheil Sardalishvili - 8	1/2
2022	2nd	1st of 10	Promoted	(Georgia (country)) Zurab Museliani - 12	1/4
2023	1st	10th of 10	Relegated	(Georgia (country)) Davit Mujiri - 9	1/16

== Squad ==
As of 4 November 2023

Note: Flags indicate national team as defined under FIFA eligibility rules; some limited exceptions apply. Players may hold more than one non-FIFA nationality.

No.	Pos.	Nation	Player
1	GK	GEO	Gogi Kulua
2	DF	GEO	Giorgi Kavtaradze
3	MF	GEO	Aleko Ananidze
4	DF	GEO	Aliko Chakvetadze
5	MF	GUI	Guy Koumba
7	FW	GEO	Beka Verulidze
8	DF	GEO	Giorgi Kimadze
9	MF	GEO	Tornike Khabazi
10	FW	GEO	Zurab Ghirdaladze
11	MF	GEO	Gia Apkhazava
12	GK	GEO	Giorgi Abramishvili
13	MF	GEO	Gaga Gazdeliani
14	DF	GEO	Luka Asatiani

No.	Pos.	Nation	Player
15	MF	GEO	Luka Nadiradze
16	MF	GEO	Jani Tsetskhladze
17	FW	GEO	Giorgi Janelidze
19	MF	GEO	David Mujiri
21	DF	IRQ	Mohammedi al-Khateeb
22	FW	GEO	Luka Robakidze
23	MF	GEO	Luka Lortkipanidze
24	FW	GEO	Giorgi Gogolashvili
27	MF	GEO	Beka Chankseliani
29	DF	GEO	Irakli Kamladze
30	MF	GEO	Lasha Kvaratskhelia
31	FW	GEO	Saba Jincharadze
32	FW	ESP	Mikel Abando

== Managers ==
Name	Nat.	From	To
Aslan Baladze	(Georgia (country))	August 2012	October 2013
Valerian Chkhartishvili	(Georgia (country))	October 2013	December 2013
Besik Sherozia	(Georgia (country))	January 2014	August 2014
Amiran Gogitidze	(Georgia (country))	August 2014	November 2014
Kostyantin Frolov	(Ukraine)	November 2014	February 2015
Gela Sanaya	(Georgia (country))	February 2015	August 2015
Temur Shalamberidze	(Georgia (country))	September 2015	September 2016
Gia Guruli	(Georgia (country))	September 2016	May 2017
Giorgi Shashiashvili	(Georgia (country))	May 2017	January 2018
Giorgi Chelidze	(Georgia (country))	January 2018	April 2018
Tengiz Kobiashvili	(Georgia (country))	May 2018	September 2019
Giorgi Shashiashvili	(Georgia (country))	September 2019	December 2021
Revaz Gotsiridze	(Georgia (country))	January 2022	January 2023
Ucha Sosiashvili	(Georgia (country))	January 2023	June 2023
Levan Jokhadze	(Georgia (country))	July 2023	August 2023
Carlos González	(Spain)	September 2023	October 2023
Revaz Dzodzuashvili	(Georgia (country))	October 2023	December 2023

== Honours ==
- Erovnuli Liga 2
  - Winners (5): 1992–93, 2003–04, 2013–14, 2020, 2022

== Notable players ==
- Davit Khocholava,
  - Later played for the likes of FC Copenhagen and Shakhtar Donetsk, as well as being a player for the Georgian national team. He played 29 matches for Shukura in 2014/15.

== Stadium ==
Chele Arena, home ground to FC Shukura, is named after Revaz Chelebadze, the famous football player born in Kobuleti. It has the capacity of 6,000 seats. In 2023, a plan to build a new stadium with a capacity of 8,000 seats was unveiled.

== Name ==
Shukura literally means a lighthouse, which is duly depicted on the club's emblem.
