= 2020 Erovnuli Liga 2 =

Erovnuli Liga 2
- Season: 2020
- Dates: 2 March – 9 December 2020
- Champions: Shukura Kobuleti
- Promoted: Shukura Kobuleti; Samgurali
- Relegated: Aragvi Dusheti
- Conference League: Gagra
- Matches: 90
- Goals: 252 (2.8 per match)
- Top goalscorer: Toma Tabatadze (13 goals)

The 2020 Erovnuli Liga 2 (formerly known as Pirveli Liga) was the 32nd season of second tier football in Georgia. The season began on 2 March 2020 and ended on 9 December 2020. Due to COVID-19 pandemic, each team will play 18 matches instead of the planned 36.

== Teams and stadiums ==
Locations of the 2020 Erovnuli Liga 2 teams.

Team	Location	Venue	Capacity
Aragvi Dusheti	Dusheti	Central Stadium	2,000
Dinamo Zugdidi	Zugdidi	Central Stadium	2,000
Gagra	Tbilisi	Mtskheta Park	2,000
Merani Martvili	Martvili	Murtaz Khurtsilava Stadium	2,000
Rustavi	Rustavi	Poladi Stadium	6,200
Samgurali	Tsqaltubo	26 May Stadium	12,000
Sioni	Bolnisi	Tamaz Stepania Stadium	3,000
Shevardeni 1906	Tbilisi	David Petriashvili Arena	2,130
Shukura	Kobuleti	Chele Arena	6,000
WIT Georgia	Tbilisi	Mikheil Meskhi Stadium#2	2,000

== League table ==
Pos	Team	Pld	W	D	L	GF	GA	GD	Pts	Promotion, qualification or relegation
1	Shukura (C, P)	18	9	4	5	32	14	+18	31	Promotion to Erovnuli Liga
2	Samgurali (P)	18	8	6	4	23	12	+11	30	Qualification for Promotion play-offs
3	Gagra	18	7	8	3	24	10	+14	29	Qualification for Europa Conference League first qualifying round and Promotion play-offs (Note: Gagra qualified for the Europa Conference League first qualifying round by winning the 2020 Georgian Cup)
4	Rustavi	18	7	5	6	35	27	+8	26	
5	Dinamo Zugdidi	18	7	4	7	27	31	−4	25	
6	Shevardeni 1906	18	8	1	9	28	38	−10	25	
7	Sioni	18	5	9	4	23	16	+7	24	
8	Merani Martvili	18	6	6	6	23	20	+3	24	Qualification for Relegation play-offs
9	WIT Georgia	18	5	6	7	17	25	−8	21	Qualification for Relegation play-offs
10	Aragvi Dusheti (R)	18	1	5	12	10	49	−39	8	Relegation to Liga 3

Source: Erovnuli Liga 2, Soccerway
Rules for classification: 1) Points; 2) Head-to-head points; 3) Head-to-head goal difference; 4) Head-to-head goals scored; 5) Head-to-head away goals scored (only if two teams); 6) Goal difference; 7) Goals scored.
(C) Champions; (P) Promoted; (R) Relegated

== Results ==
Each team will play the other nine teams home and away once, for a total of 18 games each.

Home \ Away	ARA	ZUG	GAG	MER	RUS	SAM	SIO	SHE	SHU	WIT
Aragvi Dusheti	—	1–2	0–0	1–1	0–10	0–4	1–1	1–3	1–2	2–0
Dinamo Zugdidi	1–1	—	0–2	0–1	3–1	1–4	0–0	3–0	3–2	5–2
Gagra	2–1	0–0	—	1–1	0–2	0–1	3–0	2–3	2–0	3–0
Merani Martvili	2–0	2–3	0–0	—	2–2	2–0	1–0	5–2	0–2	0–0
Rustavi	1–0	6–2	0–3	3–1	—	1–1	2–2	0–1	1–1	0–3
Samgurali	2–0	0–0	0–0	2–1	2–1	—	2–0	2–0	0–1	0–0
Sioni	6–0	2–1	1–1	1–0	0–0	2–2	—	2–0	0–0	1–2
Shevardeni 1906	7–1	3–1	0–0	0–3	0–2	2–1	0–4	—	2–0	2–4
Shukura	5–0	3–0	1–1	2–0	5–1	1–0	1–1	6–0	—	0–1
WIT Georgia	0–0	1–2	0–4	1–1	1–2	0–0	0–0	1–3	1–0	—

Source: Soccerway
Legend: Blue = home team win; Yellow = draw; Red = away team win.

== Relegation play-offs ==
16 December 2020
13:30

Gori	0–0	Merani Martvili
	Report

Kartli Stadium, Gori
Attendance: 0
Referee: Goga Kikacheishvili
20 December 2020
13:00

Merani Martvili	3–1	Gori
Saghrishvili 41'; Patsatsia 47'; Tsotsonava 85' (pen.)	Report	Alimbarashvili 73'

Murtaz Khurtsilava Stadium, Martvili
Attendance: 0
Referee: Irakli Kvirikashvili

16 December 2020
13:30

WIT Georgia	1–0	Kolkheti-1913 Poti
Natchkebia 20'	Report

David Petriashvili Arena, Tbilisi
Attendance: 0
Referee: Bakur Ninua
20 December 2020
13:00

Kolkheti-1913 Poti	1–0 (a.e.t.)	WIT Georgia
Gvalia 68'	Report
Penalties
Gvalia (penalty missed); Megrelisvili (penalty missed); Mumuladze (penalty scored); Kirkitadze (penalty scored); Kashia (penalty scored)	3–4	(penalty missed) Nemsadze; (penalty scored) Zaridze; (penalty scored) Barabadze; (penalty scored) Molashvili; (penalty scored) Museliani

Poti Training Center, Poti
Attendance: 0
Referee: Giorgi Vadatchkoria
