= Central Stadium (Batumi) =

Stadium in Batumi, Georgia

Coordinates: 41.655202°N 41.637246°E

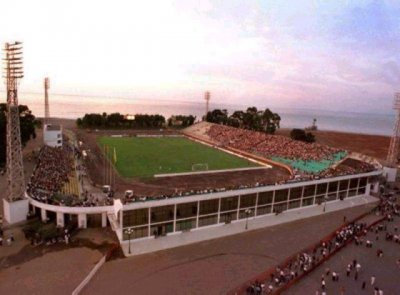

Central Stadium was a multi-use stadium in Batumi, Georgia. It was used mostly for football matches and was the home stadium of FC Dinamo Batumi. Originally the capacity of the stadium was 15,000. Later the stadium was able to hold only 4,000 people. Finally, the arena was fully demolished and in 2020 a new stadium was constructed to house FC Dinamo Batumi and occasionally the Georgian National Football Team.
