= FC Adeli Batumi =

- Full name: FC Adeli Batumi
- Founded: 2008
- Dissolved: 2015
- Ground: Adelis Stadioni
- Capacity: 1,500
- Manager: Omar Nagervadze
Home colours	Away colours

FC Adeli Batumi is a defunct Georgian football club from Batumi, Adjara.

They spent several seasons in the third and second divisions before dissolution in 2015.

== History ==
Adeli won the third tier in 2009 and advanced to Pirveli Liga where they took part in five seasons.

In 2012, the team finished in the drop zone, although avoided relegation following the Georgian Football Federation's decision to increase the number of participating teams.

Three years later the 1,500-seater Adeli stadium used by Dinamo Batumi, Adeli Batumi and a sport school was demolished by a development company, which had purchased the land for building a huge hotel complex.

Beset by financial troubles, relegated and left without a football ground, the club ceased to exist after the 2015 season.

Season	Division	Pos	M	W	D	L	GF–GA	Pts
2010–11	Pirveli Liga	12_{/17}	32	10	2	22	38-54	32
2011–12	Pirveli Liga B	8_{/10}	18	4	1	13	19-36	13
2011–12	Relegation Group	8_{/8}	20	2	4	14	33-47	10
2012–13	Pirveli Liga B	11_{/12}	30	4	3	23	27-75	15
2013–14	Pirveli Liga A	11_{/13}	24	6	4	14	28-60	22
2014–15	Pirveli Liga A	10_{/10↓}	36	6	4	26	37-94	22

== Squad ==
Note: Flags indicate national team as defined under FIFA eligibility rules; some limited exceptions apply. Players may hold more than one non-FIFA nationality.

No.	Pos.	Nation	Player
—	GK	GEO	Irakli Gorgoshadze
—	GK	GEO	Giorgi Romanadze
—	GK	GEO	Saba Tsabutashvili
—	GK	GEO	Giorgi Turmanidze
—	DF	GEO	Giorgi Tsabutashvili
—	DF	GEO	Imeda Putkaradze
—	DF	GEO	Zurab Mzhavanadze
—	DF	GEO	Merab Mamuladze
—	DF	GEO	Levan Jintcharadze
—	DF	IND	Anupam Sarkar
—	DF	GEO	Vazha Ivaniadze
—	MF	GEO	Giorgi Zhordania
—	MF	GEO	Giorgi Okruashvili
—	MF	GEO	Tamaz Mzhavanadze

No.	Pos.	Nation	Player
—	MF	GEO	Zaza Kontselidze
—	MF	GEO	Tarash Esebua
—	MF	GEO	Giorgi Driaevi
—	MF	GEO	Giorgi Chkhikvishvili
—	MF	GEO	Tornike Chaduneli
—	FW	GEO	Aivengo Varshanidze
—	FW	UKR	Vitali Soloviovi
—	FW	GEO	Bachana Mikeladze
—	FW	GEO	Luka Mikadze
—	FW	GEO	Guladi Kokoladze
—	FW	GEO	Mikheil Jorbenadze
—	FW	GEO	Irakli Ghoghoberidze
—	FW	GEO	Alexandr Batsikadze

== Past internationals ==
- (India) Anupam Sarkar (2015)
