= Chele Arena =

Multi-use stadium in Kobuleti, Georgia

Coordinates: 41°48′46.73″N 41°46′28.05″E

Chele Arena ჩელე არენა
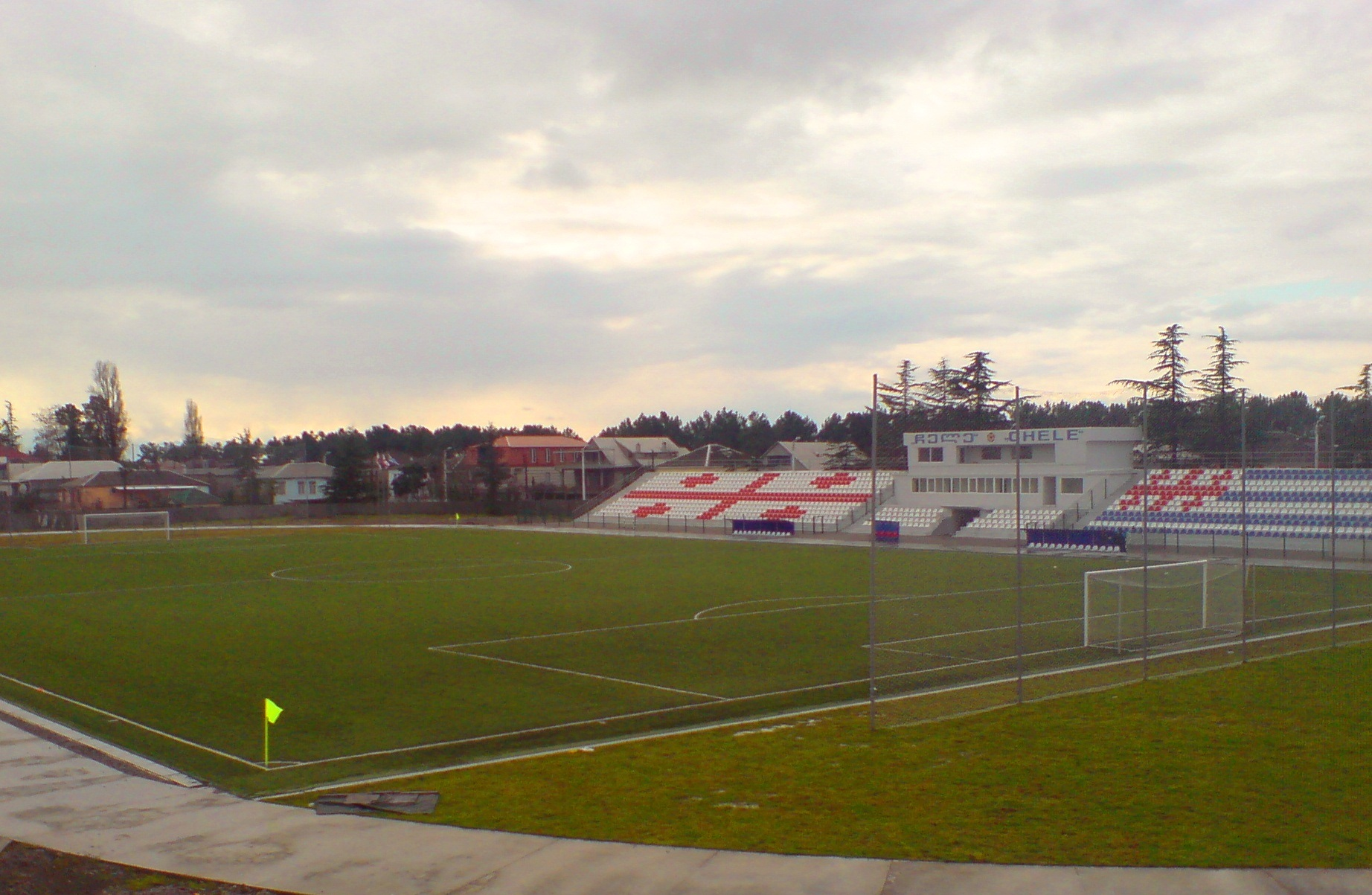
- Interactive map of Chele Arena ჩელე არენა
- Location: (Georgia (country)) Kobuleti, Georgia
- Owner: Government of Georgia
- Capacity: 6,000
- Scoreboard: Yes
- Field size: 105 m × 70 m (344 ft × 230 ft)

Construction
- Opened: 1967
- Renovated: 2012

Tenants
- FC Dinamo Batumi (until 2020); FC Shukura Kobuleti

Chele Arena is a multi-use stadium in Kobuleti, Georgia. Built in 1967, it is used mostly for football matches and is the home stadium of FC Shukura Kobuleti. FC Dinamo Batumi also used it until 2020. The stadium is able to hold 6,000 people.

After the reconstruction works were completed in September 2012, the stadium was named after Revaz Chelebadze, the most famous player to come from Kobuleti. Chelebadze won Soviet Championship in 1978 and Soviet Cup in 1976 and 1979 all with Dinamo Tbilisi. He also played for USSR National Team and became a bronze medal winner in 1980 Olympic Games in Moscow.

In September 2023, the authorities announced that a new 8,000-seater stadium would replace the existing arena in the near future.

== See also ==
Stadiums in Georgia
