= FC Sasco Tbilisi =

- Nickname: Sasco
- Founded: 2005
- Dissolved: 2010
- Ground: 35th School playing field
- Capacity: 500
- Owner(s): Gia Sichinava, Sasco Company, Tornike Gulua
- Manager: Giorgi Khizanishvili
- League: Liga 3 (Georgia)

FC Sasco Tbilisi is a defunct Georgian football club.

== History ==
The club was founded in 2005 on the base of FC Norchi Dinamoeli. The most popular players were Davit Skhirtladze and Giorgi Kvilitaia. The team owner was Gia Sichinava. The club colours were red/black.

== Honours ==
- -Erovnuli Liga 2-2010
