= Shatili Arena =

Football stadium in Tbilisi, Georgia

- Interactive map of Shatili Arena
- Full name: Shatili Arena
- Location: (Georgia (country)) Tbilisi, Georgia
- Coordinates: 41.77854°N 44.80047°E
- Owner: Tbilisi City Hall, Ministry of Sport and Youth Affairs
- Capacity: 2,500
- Surface: Artificial turf
- Field size: 100 m × 64 m (328 ft × 210 ft)

Construction
- Built: 1990 (Re-opened 2010)
- Opened: 6 December 2010

Tenants
- FC Tskhumi Sokhumi; FC Norchi Dinamoe; FC Algeti

Shatili Arena is a multi-use stadium in Tbilisi, Georgia. It is used mostly for football matches and is the home stadium of FC Tskhumi Sokhumi. The stadium is able to hold 2,000 people.
