= FC STU Tbilisi =

- Full name: FC STU Tbilisi
- Founded: 2000
- Dissolved: 2015
- Ground: shatili stadium
- Capacity: 2,000
- League: N/A

FC STU Tbilisi

FC STU Tbilisi (Georgian: საფეხბურთო კლუბი სტუ თბილისი) was a Georgian football club based in Tbilisi. It served as the official football team of the Georgian Technical University (STU). The club primarily competed in the Pirveli Liga (the second tier of the Georgian professional football league system) before becoming defunct.

History

The club was founded in the late 2000s as a professional athletic branch of the Georgian Technical University. The core purpose of the team was to bridge academic life with professional sports, providing a platform for talented university students and young local prospects to compete at a national level. Throughout its active years, FC STU Tbilisi operated as a steady competitor in the Pirveli Liga (Group B). The club focused heavily on youth development and tactical progression under Georgian coaching staffs, including manager Gocha Zhordania.

Defunct and Dissolution (2015)

During the 2014–15 Pirveli Liga season, FC STU Tbilisi experienced severe competitive struggles. The team finished at the bottom of its group, resulting in an automatic relegation to the lower divisions. Following the relegation in May 2015, the university administration and its sports department reviewed the financial viability of maintaining a large-scale professional football club. Due to a lack of independent commercial sponsors and budgetary constraints, the decision was made to dissolve the professional club. Following the dissolution, the university shifted its primary athletic funding and focus toward its futsal (indoor football) division, which remains active in the Georgian top tier today.

Stadium

FC STU Tbilisi played their home matches at the Shatili Sports Complex located in the Temka neighborhood of Tbilisi. The stadium has a capacity of approximately 1,000 to 2,000 spectators and features an artificial turf pitch FC STU Tbilisi is a Georgian football club.
