= 2025 Ukrainian Cup final =

Association football match

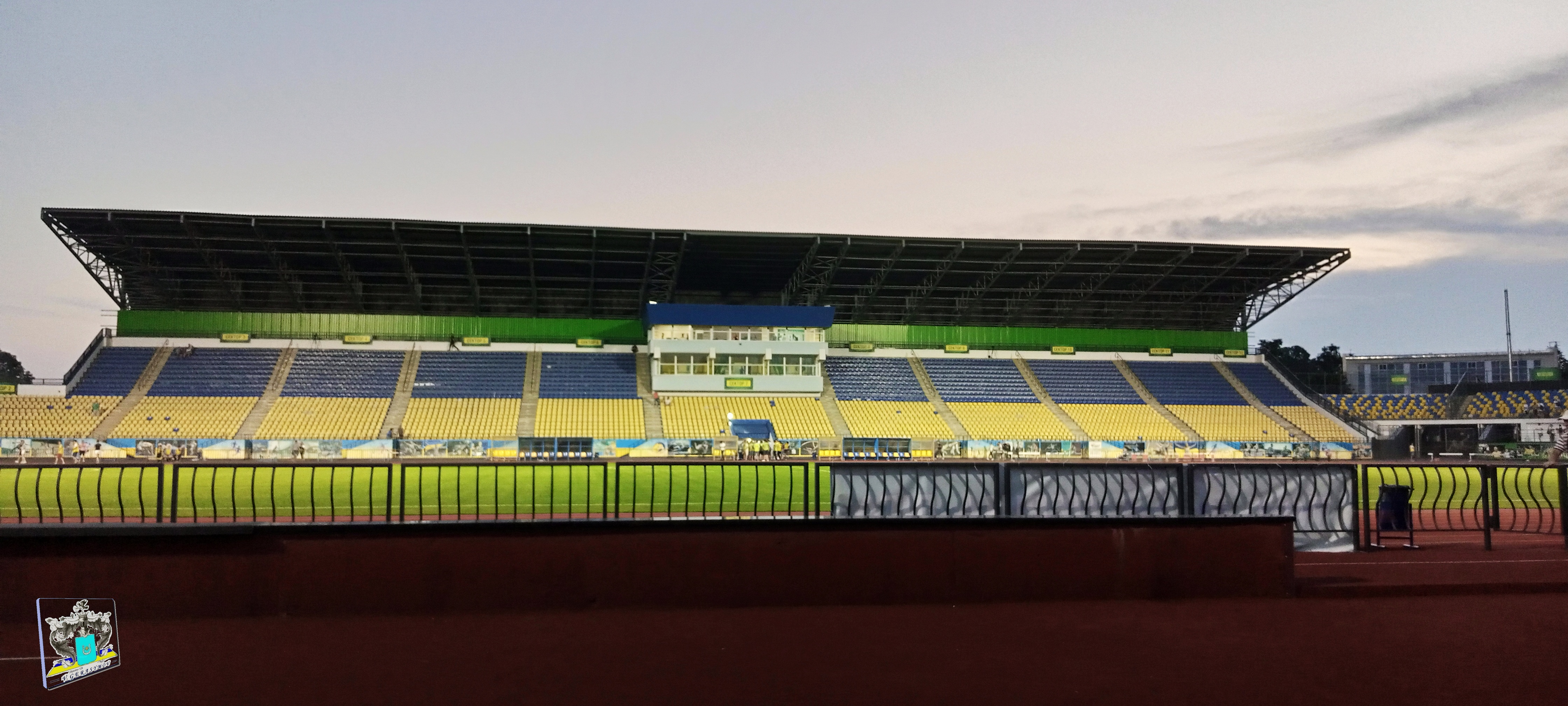
- The final match venue
- Event: 2024–25 Ukrainian Cup
Shakhtar Donetsk	Dynamo Kyiv
1	1
- After extra time Shakhtar Donetsk won 6–5 on penalties
- Date: 14 May 2025
- Venue: Tsentralnyi Stadion, Zhytomyr
- Referee: Mykola Balakin
- Attendance: 4,740
- Weather: 15°C, sunny

The 2025 Ukrainian Cup final was the 32nd final match of the annual Ukrainian football cup competition. It was played on 14 May 2025 at the Tsentralnyi Stadion in Zhytomyr. This is the first time the cup final was held in Zhytomyr.

== Road to the final ==
Note: In all results below, the score of the finalist is given first (H: home; A: away; N: neutral).

Shakhtar Donetsk		Round	Dynamo Kyiv
Opponent	Result	2024–25 Ukrainian Cup	Opponent	Result
Zorya Luhansk	1–0 (N)	Round of 16	Vorskla Poltava	2–1 (A) (a.e.t.)
FC Oleksandriya	1–0 (A) (a.e.t.)	Quarter-finals	Rukh Lviv	1–0 (A)
Polissya Zhytomyr	1–0 (A) (a.e.t.)	Semi-finals	Bukovyna Chernivtsi	4–1 (N)

=== Shakhtar Donetsk ===
As a Premier League team, Shakhtar Donetsk started in the Round of 16, they were drawn to Zorya Luhansk and won 1-0 at the Arena Lviv in Lviv thanks to a midway through the first half goal from Traoré. Due to the ongoing Russian aggression against Ukraine, both teams were forced to play away from their home cities with Shakhtar "hosting" Zorya in Lviv. In the Quarterfinals, they were drawn against FC Oleksandriya and won 1-0 in overtime at the Nika Concert and Sports Complex in Oleksandriya with a goal from Kevin. In the Semifinals, they were drawn to Polissya Zhytomyr and won 1-0 in overtime at the Tsentralnyi Miskyi Stadion in Zhytomyr thanks to a late goal from Alisson.

=== Dynamo Kyiv ===
As a Premier League team, Dynamo Kyiv started in the Round of 16, they were drawn away to the last season cup finalist Vorskla Poltava and won 2-1 in overtime at the Vorskla Stadium in Poltava thanks to goals from Guerrero (penalty) and Vanat. In the Quarter-finals, they were drawn against Rukh Lviv and won 1-0 at the Arena Lviv in Lviv with a late first half goal from Pikhalyonok. In the Semi-Finals, they were drawn to Bukovyna Chernivtsi and won 4-1 at the Ukraina Stadium in Lviv thanks to goals from Voloshyn, Popov, Brazhko (penalty) and Shaparenko.

== Previous encounters ==
The meeting between Dynamo and Shakhtar has been a main rivalry since the 1930s, when both clubs played in the Soviet competitions. As far as domestic cup competitions, the two clubs met each other three times in the Soviet Cup (1968, 1978, 1985) and 16 times in the Ukrainian Cup (2002, 2003, 2005, 2007, 2008, 2009 (twice), 2011 (twice), 2012, 2014, 2015, 2017, 2018, 2019 (twice)). In the finals, Dynamo and Shakhtar met two times in the Soviet Cup and 10 times in the Ukrainian Cup. As part of the Ukrainian Cup, their first final together took place in 2002 in Kyiv with 81,000 spectators attending the match. Six out of 10 finals were won by Dynamo. Out of 32 finals of the Ukrainian Cup, only 3 did not feature either of the clubs.

=== Teams at the competition's finals ===
Team	Previous finals appearances (bold indicates winners)
Shakhtar Donetsk	20 (**1995**, **1997**, **2001**, **2002**, 2003, **2004**, 2005, 2007, **2008**, 2009, **2011**, **2012**, **2013**, 2014, 2015, **2016**, **2017**, **2018**, **2019**, **2024**)
Dynamo Kyiv	18 (**1993**, **1996**, **1998**, **1999**, **2000**, 2002, **2003**, **2005**, **2006**, **2007**, 2008, 2011, **2014**, **2015**, 2017, 2018, **2020**, **2021**)

== Match ==
=== Summary ===
Close to the end of the first half Dynamo Kyiv took a lead in the game with a goal from its seasoned veteran Andriy Yarmolenko who hit a left flank cross from Vladyslav Dubinchak into the box. At 35, Yarmolenko became the oldest player who scored in the Ukrainian Cup finals. A midway through the second half, a Shakhtar newcomer Kauã Elias who came out on as a substitution for Eguinaldo scored an equalizer after receiving a pass from Alisson Santana. It was the first goal from Elias for Shakhtar. Also, Elias became the youngest player who scored goal in the final and 11th Brazilian to do so.

Following the extra time, the match score did not change, and the game went to a penalty shootout. The first 5 assigned from each team did not miss their mark, while a Dynamo Oleksandr Karavayev's kick from the 11-meter mark was deflected by a Shakhtar goalkeeper, Dmytro Riznyk, awarding a victory in penalty shootout and the game overall.

=== Details ===
14 May 2025

Shakhtar Donetsk (PL)	1–1 (a.e.t.)	(PL) Dynamo Kyiv
Kauã 64'	Report	Yarmolenko 43'
Penalties
Nazaryna (penalty scored); Alisson (penalty scored); Kevin (penalty scored); Kauã (penalty scored); Ghram (penalty scored); Kryskiv (penalty scored)	6–5	(penalty scored) Vanat; (penalty scored) Brazhko; (penalty scored) Vivcharenko; (penalty scored) Mykhailenko; (penalty scored) Pikhalyonok; (penalty missed) Karavayev

Tsentralnyi, Zhytomyr
Referee: Mykola Balakin (Kyiv Oblast)

Shakhtar Donetsk	Dynamo Kyiv

Shakhtar Donetsk:
GK	31	(Ukraine) Dmytro Riznyk
LB	13	(Brazil) Pedro Henrique
CB	22	(Ukraine) Mykola Matviyenko (c)
CB	5	(Ukraine) Valeriy Bondar
RB	17	(Brazil) Vinicius Tobias	(substituted off) 102'
DM	6	(Brazil) Marlon Gomes	(yellow card) 53' (substituted off) 62'
CM	10	(Ukraine) Heorhiy Sudakov	(substituted off) 90'
CM	21	(Ukraine) Artem Bondarenko	(substituted off) 62'
LW	11	(Brazil) Kevin
ST	7	(Brazil) Eguinaldo	(yellow card) 34' (substituted off) 46'
RW	38	(Brazil) Pedrinho	(substituted off) 62'
Substitutions:
GK	23	(Ukraine) Kiril Fesyun
FW	2	(Burkina Faso) Lassina Traoré
MF	8	(Ukraine) Dmytro Kryskiv	(substituted on) 62'
MF	9	(Ukraine) Maryan Shved
DF	16	(Georgia (country)) Irakli Azarovi
DF	18	(Tunisia) Alaa Ghram	(substituted on) 102'
FW	19	(Brazil) Kauã Elias	(substituted on) 46'
MF	24	(Ukraine) Viktor Tsukanov	(substituted on) 90'
MF	29	(Ukraine) Yehor Nazaryna	(substituted on) 62'
MF	30	(Brazil) Alisson Santana	(substituted on) 62'
MF	39	(Brazil) Newerton
DF	74	(Ukraine) Marian Faryna
Head coach:
(Netherlands) Marino Pušić

Dynamo Kyiv:
GK	35	(Ukraine) Ruslan Neshcheret
LB	44	(Ukraine) Vladyslav Dubinchak	(yellow card) 97' (substituted off) 104'
CB	32	(Ukraine) Taras Mykhavko	(substituted off) 112'
CB	4	(Ukraine) Denys Popov
RB	18	(Ukraine) Oleksandr Tymchyk
LM	22	(Ukraine) Vladyslav Kabayev	(substituted off) 91'
CM	10	(Ukraine) Mykola Shaparenko	(substituted off) 74'
CM	91	(Ukraine) Mykola Mykhailenko
RM	7	(Ukraine) Andriy Yarmolenko	(yellow card) 61' (substituted off) 81'
CF	11	(Ukraine) Vladyslav Vanat	(yellow card) 53'
CF	29	(Ukraine) Vitaliy Buyalskyi (c)	(substituted off) 81'
Substitutions:
GK	1	(Ukraine) Valentyn Morhun
DF	2	(Ukraine) Kostyantyn Vivcharenko	(substituted on) 104'
MF	6	(Ukraine) Volodymyr Brazhko	(substituted on) 74'
MF	9	(Ukraine) Nazar Voloshyn	(substituted on) 81'
MF	15	(Ukraine) Valentyn Rubchynskyi
MF	20	(Ukraine) Oleksandr Karavayev	(substituted on) 91'
DF	25	(Ukraine) Maksym Dyachuk
FW	39	(Panama) Eduardo Guerrero
DF	40	(Ukraine) Kristian Bilovar	(substituted on) 112'
MF	45	(Ukraine) Maksym Braharu
MF	76	(Ukraine) Oleksandr Pikhalyonok	(substituted on) 81'
FW	99	(Ukraine) Matviy Ponomarenko
Head coach:
(Ukraine) Oleksandr Shovkovskyi

Match officials

- Referee assistants:
  - Oleksandr Berkut (Sumy)
  - Dmytro Zaporozhenko (Zaporizhia)
- Fourth referee: Dmytro Panchyshyn (Kharkiv)
- Additional referee assistant: Volodymyr Dumenko (Kharkiv)
- Refereeing supervisor: Ihor Khiblin (Khmelnytskyi).
- VAR referee — Denys Shurman (Kyiv Oblast)
- VAR assistant — Oleksiy Derevinskyi (Khmelnytskyi)
- VAR supervisor — Anatoliy Abdula (Kharkiv).
- UAF delegate — Hryhoriy Simonov (Kyiv).

Regulation highlightes

- 90 minutes.
- 30 minutes of extra time if needed.
- Penalty kicks if needed.
- 12 players for substitution.
- Maximum 5 substitution per match (+1 in case of extra time).

== See also ==
- 2024–25 Ukrainian Premier League
- Klasychne derby – Ukrainian Classic rivalry
