= 2025–26 FC Shakhtar Donetsk season =

Shakhtar Donetsk
2025–26 season
- Chairman: Rinat Akhmetov
- Manager: Arda Turan
- Stadium: Arena Lviv (League); Stožice Stadium (Europe); Henryk Reyman Municipal Stadium (Europe)
- Premier League: Champions
- Ukrainian Cup: Round of 16
- UEFA Europa League: Third qualifying round
- UEFA Conference League: Semi-final
- Top goalscorer: League: Eguinaldo (7); Lassina Traoré (7); All: Kauã Elias (11); Luca Meirelles (11)
- Highest home attendance: 12,828 vs Beşiktaş (31 July 2025)
- Lowest home attendance: 650 vs Ilves (10 July 2025)
- Average home league attendance: 2,621 (21 May 2026)
Home colours	Away colours	Third colours

The 2025–26 season was FC Shakhtar Donetsk's 35th season in existence and the club's 27th consecutive season in the top flight of Ukrainian football. In addition to the domestic league, Shakhtar Donetsk participated in the Ukrainian Cup and the UEFA Europa League. The season covers the period from 1 July 2025 to 30 June 2026.

== Season events ==
On 27 May, Shakhtar announced Arda Turan as their new head coach, on a two-year contract.

On 11 July, Shakhtar announced the return of Marlon Santos.

On 26 July, Luka Latsabidze joined Dinamo Tbilisi on loan for the remainder of the year.

On 7 August, Giorgi Gocholeishvili joined Hamburger SV on loan for the rest of the 2025–26 season.

On 16 August, Shakhtar announced the signing of Lucas Ferreira from São Paulo, to a five-year contract.

On 28 August, Shakhtar announced the signing of Luca Meirelles from Santos on a contract until 30 June 2030, and the signing of Isaque from Fluminense also on a contract until 30 June 2030.

On 30 August, Heorhiy Sudakov left Shakhtar, joining Benfica initially on loan until the end of the season for a fee of €6,750,000, with a deal agreed to make the move permanent in the summer of 2026 for €20,250,000 with €5,000,000 in potential addons and a 25% sell on fee.

On 1 September, Kevin left Shakhtar in order to sign for Fulham.

On 24 November, Shakhtar announced that they had extended their contract with Oleh Ocheretko until 31 December 2030.

On 14 December, Shakhtar announced the signing of Prosper Obah from LNZ Cherkasy, on a contract until 31 December 2030.

On 30 December, Shakhtar announced that Ivan Losenko had joined CF Montréal on loan for one year, with the option to extend it for an additional two years, after his loan to Kudrivka was ended early.

On 2 February, Luka Latsabidze joined Vejle on loan for the remainder of the season.

On 8 February, Shakhtar announced that they had signed a new contract with Pedro Henrique, until 31 December 2030.

On 11 February, Shakhtar announced that they had signed a new contract with Dmytro Kryskiv, until 31 December 2030, whilst Anton Hlushchenko had left the club to join Kudrivka on loan until the end of the season.

On 18 April, Shakhtar announced the signing of Bruninho from Athletico Paranaense to a three-year contract, with Bruninho joining the club in August 2026 once he turns 18.

On 19 May, Shakhtar announced that Marlon Santos had extended his contract with the club until the 30 June 2028, whilst Lassina Traoré had extended his contract with the club until 30 June 2031.

On 22 May, Shakhtar announced the signing of Gleiker Mendoza from Kryvbas Kryvyi Rih on a contract until 30 June 2031.

On 29 May, Shakhtar confirmed that Yukhym Konoplya would be leaving the club, and had signed for Bundesliga club Borussia Mönchengladbach.

== Squad ==
As of match played 21 May 2026

Number	Player	Nationality	Position	Date of birth (age)	Signed from	Signed in	Contract ends	Apps.	Goals
Goalkeepers
23	Kiril Fesyun	(Ukraine)	GK	7 August 2002 (aged 23)	Kolos Kovalivka	2024	2029	14	0
31	Dmytro Riznyk	(Ukraine)	GK	30 January 1999 (aged 27)	Vorskla Poltava	2023	2028	116	0
34	Rostyslav Bahlay	(Ukraine)	GK	1 February 2008 (aged 18)	Academy	2024		1	0
48	Denys Tvardovskyi	(Ukraine)	GK	13 June 2003 (aged 22)	Academy	2023		5	0
	Tymur Puzankov	(Ukraine)	GK	4 March 2003 (aged 23)	Academy	2021		0	0
Defenders
3	Diego Arroyo	(Bolivia)	DF	29 April 2005 (aged 21)	Club Bolívar	2025	2029	2	0
4	Marlon Santos	(Brazil)	DF	7 September 1995 (aged 30)	Unattached	2025	2028	38	0
5	Valeriy Bondar	(Ukraine)	DF	27 February 1999 (aged 27)	Academy	2019		187	6
13	Pedro Henrique	(Brazil)	DF	11 July 2002 (aged 23)	Athletico Paranaense	2023	2030	82	1
16	Irakli Azarovi	(Georgia (country))	DF	21 February 2002 (aged 24)	Red Star Belgrade	2023	2028	67	0
17	Vinicius Tobias	(Brazil)	DF	23 February 2004 (aged 22)	Internacional	2022	2029	66	2
18	Alaa Ghram	(Tunisia)	DF	24 July 2001 (aged 24)	CS Sfaxien	2024	2029	30	1
22	Mykola Matviyenko	(Ukraine)	DF	2 May 1996 (aged 30)	Academy	2015	2027	175	16
26	Yukhym Konoplya	(Ukraine)	DF	26 August 1999 (aged 26)	Academy	2017		114	7
65	Mykola Ogarkov	(Ukraine)	DF	18 February 2005 (aged 21)	Academy	2024		1	0
Midfielders
6	Marlon Gomes	(Brazil)	MF	14 December 2003 (aged 22)	Vasco da Gama	2024	2028	81	10
8	Dmytro Kryskiv	(Ukraine)	MF	6 October 2000 (aged 25)	Academy	2019	2030	110	13
9	Maryan Shved	(Ukraine)	MF	16 July 1997 (aged 28)	KV Mechelen	2022	2027	54	9
10	Pedrinho	(Brazil)	MF	13 April 1998 (aged 28)	Benfica	2021	2029	90	13
11	Newerton	(Brazil)	MF	3 June 2005 (aged 20)	São Paulo	2023	2028	84	12
14	Isaque	(Brazil)	MF	24 February 2007 (aged 19)	Fluminense	2025	2030	38	7
21	Artem Bondarenko	(Ukraine)	MF	21 August 2000 (aged 25)	Academy	2020	2028	165	33
24	Viktor Tsukanov	(Ukraine)	MF	4 February 2006 (aged 20)	Academy	2024	2028	11	0
27	Oleh Ocheretko	(Ukraine)	MF	25 March 2003 (aged 23)	Academy	2020	2030	63	5
29	Yehor Nazaryna	(Ukraine)	MF	10 July 1997 (aged 28)	Zorya Luhansk	2022	2027	102	6
37	Lucas Ferreira	(Brazil)	MF	28 April 2006 (aged 20)	São Paulo	2025	2030	30	3
68	Prosper Obah	(Nigeria)	MF	24 November 2003 (aged 22)	LNZ Cherkasy	2025	2030	12	3
Forwards
2	Lassina Traoré	(Burkina Faso)	FW	12 January 2001 (aged 25)	Ajax	2021	2031	115	31
7	Eguinaldo	(Brazil)	FW	9 August 2004 (aged 21)	Vasco da Gama	2023	2028	84	19
19	Kauã Elias	(Brazil)	FW	28 March 2006 (aged 20)	Fluminense	2025	2029	46	12
30	Alisson Santana	(Brazil)	FW	21 September 2005 (aged 20)	Atlético Mineiro	2025	2030	38	8
49	Luca Meirelles	(Brazil)	FW	15 March 2007 (aged 19)	Santos	2025	2030	29	11
Away on loan
10	Heorhiy Sudakov	(Ukraine)	MF	1 September 2002 (aged 23)	Academy	2020	2028	146	34
12	Giorgi Gocholeishvili	(Georgia (country))	DF	14 February 2001 (aged 25)	Saburtalo Tbilisi	2023	2027	40	1
20	Anton Hlushchenko	(Ukraine)	MF	20 April 2004 (aged 22)	Academy	2022		11	2
25	Kyrylo Siheyev	(Ukraine)	MF	16 May 2004 (aged 22)	Academy	2021		0	0
32	Eduard Kozik	(Ukraine)	DF	19 April 2003 (aged 23)	Academy	2021		8	0
55	Luka Latsabidze	(Georgia (country))	DF	18 March 2004 (aged 22)	Dinamo Tbilisi	2024	2028	0	0
74	Maryan Faryna	(Ukraine)	DF	28 August 2003 (aged 22)	Academy	2022		8	0
77	Khusrav Toirov	(Tajikistan)	MF	1 August 2004 (aged 21)	Atyrau	2023	2027	2	0
	Viktor Korniyenko	(Ukraine)	DF	14 February 1999 (aged 27)	Academy	2016		30	1
	Roman Savchenko	(Ukraine)	DF	17 February 2004 (aged 22)	Academy	2021		0	0
	Danylo Udod	(Ukraine)	DF	9 March 2004 (aged 22)	Academy	2021		0	0
	Ivan Petryak	(Ukraine)	MF	13 March 1994 (aged 32)	Fehérvár	2022	2026	38	3
Players who left during the season
11	Kevin	(Brazil)	MF	4 January 2003 (aged 23)	Palmeiras	2024	2028	57	17
20	Dmytro Topalov	(Ukraine)	MF	12 March 1998 (aged 28)	Academy	2017		18	0
35	Vladyslav Kravets	(Ukraine)	GK	28 January 2005 (aged 21)	Academy	2021		0	0
	Maycon	(Brazil)	MF	15 July 1997 (aged 28)	Corinthians	2018	2025	98	8

== Transfers ==
=== In ===
Date	Position	Nationality	Name	From	Fee	Ref.
11 July 2025	DF	(Brazil)	Marlon Santos	Unattached	Free	
16 August 2025	MF	(Brazil)	Lucas Ferreira	São Paulo	Undisclosed	
28 August 2025	MF	(Brazil)	Isaque	Fluminense	Undisclosed	
28 August 2025	FW	(Brazil)	Luca Meirelles	Santos	Undisclosed	
14 December 2025	MF	(Nigeria)	Prosper Obah	LNZ Cherkasy	Undisclosed	

=== Out ===
Date	Position	Nationality	Name	To	Fee	Ref.
27 June 2025	DF	(Israel)	Stav Lemkin	Twente	Undisclosed	
30 August 2025 (Note: Transfer announced on the shown date, becoming official on 1 July 2026.)	MF	(Ukraine)	Heorhiy Sudakov	Benfica	€20,250,000	
1 September 2025	MF	(Brazil)	Kevin	Fulham	Undisclosed	
5 September 2025	GK	(Ukraine)	Vladyslav Kravets	Tatran Prešov	Undisclosed	
5 February 2026	MF	(Ukraine)	Dmytro Topalov	Aktobe	Undisclosed	

=== Loans out ===
Date from	Position	Nationality	Name	To	Date to	Ref.
14 July 2025	MF	(Ukraine)	Kyrylo Siheyev	Tatran Prešov	End of season	
26 July 2025	DF	(Georgia (country))	Luka Latsabidze	Dinamo Tbilisi	31 December 2025	
2 August 2025	MF	(Ukraine)	Ivan Losenko	Kudrivka	30 December 2025	
7 August 2025	DF	(Georgia (country))	Giorgi Gocholeishvili	Hamburger SV	30 June 2026	
30 August 2025	MF	(Ukraine)	Heorhiy Sudakov	Benfica	30 June 2026	
30 December 2025	MF	(Ukraine)	Ivan Losenko	CF Montréal	30 December 2026	
2 February 2026	DF	(Georgia (country))	Luka Latsabidze	Vejle	30 June 2026	
11 February 2026	MF	(Ukraine)	Anton Hlushchenko	Kudrivka	30 June 2026	
18 February 2026	MF	(Tajikistan)	Khusrav Toirov	Istiklol	30 November 2026	
19 February 2026	DF	(Ukraine)	Maryan Faryna	Kudrivka	30 June 2026	

=== Released ===
Date	Position	Nationality	Name	Joined	Date	Ref.
31 December 2025	MF	(Brazil)	Maycon	Atlético Mineiro	13 January 2026	
30 June 2026	DF	(Ukraine)	Yukhym Konoplya	Borussia Mönchengladbach	1 July 2026	

== Friendlies ==
4 July 2025	ND Gorica	0–1	Shakhtar Donetsk	Predoslje, Slovenia
19:00 EET (UTC+3)		Report	Eguinaldo 51'	Stadium: Brdo Elegance Hotel sports complex Attendance: 100

6 July 2025	1. FC Slovácko	1–1	Shakhtar Donetsk	Predoslje, Slovenia
21:00 EET (UTC+3)	Havlík 26'	Report	Newerton 71'	Stadium: Brdo Elegance Hotel sports complex Attendance: 100

11 July 2025	Brinje Grosuplje	0–5	Shakhtar Donetsk	Predoslje, Slovenia
19:00 EET (UTC+3)		Report	Eguinaldo 45', 59'; Traoré 47', 66'; Gocholeishvili 79' (pen.)	Stadium: Brdo Elegance Hotel sports complex

18 July 2025	Triglav Kranj	1–0	Shakhtar Donetsk	Predoslje, Slovenia
11:00 EET (UTC+3)	Benedičič 16'	Report		Stadium: Brdo Elegance Hotel sports complex
Note: Match consisted of two halves of 30 minutes.

3 February 2026	Shakhtar Donetsk	1–2	Sonnenhof Großaspach	Antalya, Turkey
16:00 EET (UTC+3)	Pedrinho 71' (pen.)	Report	Kunde 2'; Maier 88'	Stadium: Mardan Stadium; Attendance: 100

5 February 2026	Shakhtar Donetsk	2–1	Riga	Antalya, Turkey
16:00 EET (UTC+3)	Eguinaldo 54'; Konoplya 61'	Report	Reginaldo 39' (pen.)	Stadium: Mardan Stadium; Attendance: 100

7 February 2026	Shakhtar Donetsk	7–2	Dinamo Tbilisi	Antalya, Turkey
EET (UTC+3)	Elias 17'; Ugrekhelidze 21' (o.g.); Bondarenko 44' (pen.); Nazaryna 48', 87'; Ferreira 50'; Obah 63'	Report	Kharebashvili 2'; Osei 41'	Stadium: Mardan Stadium; Attendance: 100

10 February 2025	Shakhtar Donetsk	0–1	LNZ Cherkasy	Antalya, Turkey
16:00 EET (UTC+3)		Report	Horin 53'	Stadium: Mardan Stadium; Attendance: 100

13 February 2025	Shakhtar Donetsk	3–2	Dila Gori	Antalya, Turkey
13:00 EET (UTC+3)	Isaque 5'; Smetana 10'; Traoré 54'	Report	Fuller 55'; Shekiladze 61' (pen.)	Stadium: Mardan Stadium; Attendance: 100

13 February 2025	Shakhtar Donetsk	3–0	Rustavi	Antalya, Turkey
16:00 EET (UTC+3)	Elias 45+1', 89'; Nazaryna 65'	Report		Stadium: Mardan Stadium; Attendance: 100

== Competitions ==
=== Overall record ===
Competition	First match	Last match	Starting round	Final position	Record							
Competition	First match	Last match	Starting round	Final position	Pld	W	D	L	GF	GA	GD	Win %
Premier League	3 August 2025	21 May 2026	Matchday 1	Winners	30	22	6	2	71	21	+50	73.33
Ukrainian Cup	17 September 2025	29 October 2025	Round of 32	Round of 16	2	1	0	1	2	2	+0	50.00
Europa League	10 July 2025	14 August 2025	First qualifying round	Third qualifying round	6	3	3	0	12	2	+10	50.00
Conference League	21 August 2025	7 May 2026	Play-off round	Semi-final	14	7	3	4	24	17	+7	50.00
Total					52	33	12	7	109	42	+67	63.46

Last updated: 21 May 2026
Source: Results

=== Premier League ===
==== League table ====
Pos	Team	Pld	W	D	L	GF	GA	GD	Pts	Qualification or relegation
1	Shakhtar Donetsk (C)	30	22	6	2	71	21	+50	72	Qualification for the Champions League league phase (Note: Shakhtar Donetsk was moved to the Champions League league phase as the champion with the highest club coefficient in the Champions League qualifying rounds, due to re-balancing from the 2025–26 UEFA Champions League winner already qualifying for league phase via their domestic league.)
2	LNZ Cherkasy	30	18	6	6	39	17	+22	60	Qualification for the Conference League second qualifying round
3	Polissya Zhytomyr	30	18	5	7	51	21	+30	59	Qualification for the Conference League second qualifying round
4	Dynamo Kyiv (Note: Dynamo Kyiv is the winner of the 2025–26 Ukrainian Cup)	30	17	6	7	66	36	+30	57	Qualification for the Europa League first qualifying round
5	Metalist 1925 Kharkiv	30	13	12	5	36	19	+17	51	

Updated to match(es) played on 24 May 2026. Source: upl.ua
Rules for classification: 1) Points; 2) Head-to-head points; 3) Head-to-head goal difference; 4) Head-to-head goals scored; 5) Goal difference; 6) Goals scored; 7) Draw or "Golden match" if two teams tied for title (Article 22, paragraph 3).
(C) Champions
Notes:

Teams that placed 13th and 14th in the 2025–26 Ukrainian Premier League play a two-leg play-off with the third and fourth teams of the 2025–26 Ukrainian First League.

The withdrawn 14th-placed Rukh Lviv (Note: The participation of FC Rukh in the relegation playoffs is to be confirmed, since the owner announced that the club may not participate in that stage.) was replaced with the 15th-placed FC Oleksandriya.

This round includes 2 clubs from the Premier League: FC Oleksandriya and Kudrivka; 2 clubs from the First League: Livyi Bereh Kyiv and Ahrobiznes Volochysk.

Premier League teams	Agg.	First League teams	1st leg	2nd leg
FC Oleksandriya	1–2	Livyi Bereh Kyiv	1–1	0–1
Kudrivka	2–2 (3–2 p)	Ahrobiznes Volochysk	0–0	2–2

=== First Semi-final ===
5 June 2025
15:30

FC Oleksandriya	1–1	Livyi Bereh Kyiv
Yade 21'	Report	Voloshyn 51'

CSC Nika, Oleksandriya
Attendance: 1170
Referee: Oleksiy Derevinskyi (Khmelnytskyi)

9 June 2026
15:30

Livyi Bereh Kyiv	1–0	FC Oleksandriya
Banada 45'	Report

Arena Livyi Bereh, Kyiv
Attendance: 1285
Referee: Dmytro Panchyshyn (Kharkiv)

Livyi Bereh Kyiv won 2–1 on aggregate and promotion to Premier League.

==== Second Semi-final ====
5 June 2026
18:00

Kudrivka	0–0	Ahrobiznes Volochysk
	Report

Avanhard, Rivne
Attendance: 75
Referee: Vitaliy Romanov (Dnipro)

9 June 2026
18:00

Ahrobiznes Volochysk	2–2	Kudrivka
B. Kozak 70'; Tolochko 90+1' (p)	Report	Machelyuk 39'; Lyehostayev 81'
Penalties
Havrushko (penalty missed); B.Kozak (penalty scored); Riznyk (penalty missed); Nyzhnyk (penalty scored); Tolochko (penalty missed)	2–3	(penalty missed) Veklyak; (penalty scored) Dumanyuk; (penalty scored) Machelyuk; (penalty missed) Hlushchenko; (penalty scored) Lyehostayev

Ternopilskyi miskyi imeni Shukhevycha, Ternopil
Attendance: 2500
Referee: Oleksandr Shandor (Lviv)

2–2 on aggregate; Kudrivka won 3–2 on penalties

==== Results summary ====
Overall								Home						Away					
Pld	W	D	L	GF	GA	GD	Pts	W	D	L	GF	GA	GD	W	D	L	GF	GA	GD
30	22	6	2	68	21	+47	72	12	1	2	34	10	+24	10	5	0	34	11	+23

Last updated: 21 May 2026.
Source: Results

==== Results by round ====
Round	1	2	3	4	5	6	7	8	9	10	11	12	13	14	15	16	17	18	19	20	22	23	24	21	25	26	27	28	29	30
Ground	A	A	A	H	A	H	A	H	A	H	H	H	A	H	A	H	H	H	A	H	A	A	H	A	A	A	A	H	A	H
Result	W	D	W	W	D	W	W	L	D	W	W	W	W	D	D	W	W	W	W	W	W	D	W	W	W	W	W	W	W	L
Position	6	3	2	2	2	2	1	1	2	1	1	1	1	1	2	2	2	1	1	1	2	2	1	1	1	1	1	1	1	1

Updated to match(es) played on 21 May 2026. Source: Results
A = Away; H = Home; W = Win; D = Draw; L = Loss

==== Results ====
3 August 2025 1	Epitsentr Kamianets-Podilskyi	0–1	Shakhtar Donetsk	Ternopil
15:30 EEST (UTC+3)	Coch (yellow card) 41'; Joaquinete (yellow card) 57'; Moroz (yellow card) 87'	Report	Kauã Elias 79'	Stadium: Roman Shukhevych Ternopil city stadium Attendance: 9,850; Referee: Klym Zabroda

10 August 2025 2	Karpaty Lviv	3–3	Shakhtar Donetsk	Lviv
18:00 EEST (UTC+3)	Neves 18'; Krasnopir (yellow card) 65' (goal) 90+2'; Bruninho 77'; Miroshnichenko (yellow card) 90+7'	Report	Newerton 9'; Kauã Elias 23'; Azarovi (yellow card) 28'; Konoplya (yellow card) 45'; Alisson 82'	Stadium: Ukraina Stadium; Attendance: 6,500; Referee: Mykola Balakin

17 August 2025 3	Veres Rivne	0–2	Shakhtar Donetsk	Rivne
15:30 EEST (UTC+3)	Honcharenko (yellow card) 54'; Boyko (yellow card) 71'	Report	Konoplya 45+1'; Tobias 62'	Stadium: Avanhard Stadium; Attendance: 5,420; Referee: Denys Shurman

31 August 2025 4	Shakhtar Donetsk	2–0	Oleksandriya	Lviv
18:00 EEST (UTC+3)	Bondarenko 25'; Pedrinho 37'; Kauã Elias (penalty missed) 69'	Report	Cara (yellow card) 36'; Touati (yellow card) 53'; Behiratche (yellow card) 68'; Silva (yellow card) 90+1'	Stadium: Arena Lviv; Attendance: 2,261; Referee: Klym Zabroda

13 September 2025 5	Metalist 1925 Kharkiv	1–1	Shakhtar Donetsk	Zhytomyr
18:00 EEST (UTC+3)	Shabanov (yellow card) 20'; Kalyuzhnyi (yellow card) 21' (goal) 85'	Report	Bondarenko 22' (pen.); Ocheretko (yellow card) 66'; Newerton (yellow card) 81'	Stadium: Tsentralnyi Stadion; Attendance: 3,169; Referee: Oleksii Derevinskyi

22 September 2025 6	Shakhtar Donetsk	1–0	Zorya Luhansk	Lviv
18:00 EEST (UTC+3)	Isaque 87' (yellow card) 87'	Report		Stadium: Arena Lviv; Attendance: 2,158; Referee: Vitalii Romanov

28 September 2025 7	Rukh Lviv	0–4	Shakhtar Donetsk	Lviv
18:00 EEST (UTC+3)	Lyakh (yellow card) 59'; Slyubyk (yellow card) 62'	Report	Meirelles 27' (yellow card) 56'; Pedrinho 31', 49'; Marlon (yellow card) 62'; Konoplya (yellow card) 69'; Isaque 90'	Stadium: Arena Lviv; Attendance: 2,320; Referee: Oleksandr Kalonov

5 October 2025 8	Shakhtar Donetsk	1–4	LNZ Cherkasy	Lviv
18:00 EEST (UTC+3)	Nazaryna 85'; Santos (yellow card) FT	Report	Kuzyk 13'; Ryabov (yellow card) 47' (goal) 71'; Assinor 62' (yellow card) FT; Obah 89' (yellow card) 90'	Stadium: Arena Lviv; Attendance: 2,319; Referee: Dmytro Panchyshyn

18 October 2025 9	Polissya Zhytomyr	0–0	Shakhtar Donetsk	Zhytomyr
18:00 EEST (UTC+3)	Kravchenko (yellow card) 86'	Report	Bondar (yellow card) 75'	Stadium: Tsentralnyi Stadion; Attendance: 4,840; Referee: Oleksandr Afanasiev

26 October 2025 10	Shakhtar Donetsk	4–0	Kudrivka	Lviv
15:30 EET (UTC+2)	Kauã Elias 7', 51'; Ocheretko 32' (yellow card) 52'; Marlon (yellow card) 50'; Hlushchenko (yellow card) 71' (goal) 87'	Report	Melnychuk (yellow card) 64'; Korkishko (penalty missed) 72'	Stadium: Arena Lviv; Attendance: 2,354; Referee: Roman Blavatskyi

2 November 2025 11	Shakhtar Donetsk	3–1	Dynamo Kyiv	Lviv
18:00 EET (UTC+2)	Eguinaldo 3'; Marlon (yellow card) 13'; Newerton 54' (yellow card) 55'; Kabayev 90+4' (o.g.)	Report	Thiaré (yellow card) 40'; Buyalskyi 56'	Stadium: Arena Lviv; Attendance: 4,200; Referee: Vitalii Romanov

9 November 2025 12	Shakhtar Donetsk	7–1	Poltava	Lviv
18:00 EET (UTC+2)	Marlon 3'; Pedrinho 17' (pen.); Eguinaldo 57'; Ocheretko 62'; Newerton 82'; Konoplya 90'; Pidlepych 90+3' (o.g.)	Report	Bazhan (yellow card) 36'; Marusych (yellow card) 37'; Halenkov 53'	Stadium: Arena Lviv; Attendance: 2,412; Referee: Maksym Kozyriatskyi

22 November 2025 13	Obolon Kyiv	0–6	Shakhtar Donetsk	Kyiv
18:00 EET (UTC+2)	Pryimak (yellow card) 51'; Sukhanov (yellow card) 53' (yellow-red card) 56'; Chekh (yellow card) 87'	Report	Meirelles (yellow card) 41' (goal) 49'; Bondar 45+1'; Tobias 48'; Eguinaldo 69'; Isaque 80'; Kauã Elias 82'	Stadium: Obolon Arena; Attendance: 2,560; Referee: Oleksandr Shandor

1 December 2025 14	Shakhtar Donetsk	2–2	Kryvbas Kryvyi Rih	Lviv
18:00 EET (UTC+2)	Pedro Henrique (yellow card) 27'; Ocheretko 38'; Eguinaldo (yellow card) 57' (goal) 90+5'	Report	Zaderaka 13'; Konaté (yellow card) 28'; Vilivald 40'	Stadium: Arena Lviv; Attendance: 2,379; Referee: Viktor Kopievskii

6 December 2025 15	Kolos Kovalivka	0–0	Shakhtar Donetsk	Kovalivka
15:30 EET (UTC+2)	Salabay (yellow card) 84'	Report	Kryskiv (yellow card) 65'	Stadium: Kolos Stadium; Attendance: 2,789; Referee: Maksym Kozyriatskyi

14 December 2025 16	Shakhtar Donetsk	5–0	Epitsentr Kamianets-Podilskyi	Lviv
18:00 EET (UTC+2)	Pedrinho 9' (pen.); Newerton 20'; Kauã Elias 56'; Meirelles 87', 89'	Report	Joaquinete (yellow card) 8'; S.Krystin (yellow card) 47'	Stadium: Arena Lviv; Attendance: 2,417; Referee: Volodymyr Novohatnii

22 February 2026 17	Shakhtar Donetsk	3–0	Karpaty Lviv	Lviv
15:30 EET (UTC+2)	Traoré 67', 71', 82'; Marlon (yellow card) 77'	Report		Stadium: Arena Lviv; Attendance: 4,117; Referee: Oleksandr Afanasiev

27 February 2026 18	Shakhtar Donetsk	1–0	Veres Rivne	Lviv
15:30 EET (UTC+2)	Alisson (yellow card) 59'; Pedrinho (yellow card) 62'; Bondar 80'	Report	Korniychuk (yellow card) 76'	Stadium: Arena Lviv; Attendance: 2,307; Referee: Oleksandr Shandor

6 March 2026 19	Oleksandriya	0–1	Shakhtar Donetsk	Oleksandriia
13:00 EET (UTC+2)	Shostak (yellow card) 40'; Campos (yellow card) 59'; Castillo (yellow card) 90+1'	Report	Traoré 61'	Stadium: CSC Nika Stadium; Attendance: 1,180; Referee: Klym Zabroda

15 March 2026 20	Shakhtar Donetsk	1–0	Metalist 1925 Kharkiv	Lviv
18:00 EET (UTC+2)	Ocheretko (yellow card) 45'; Bondar (yellow card) 53'; Pedrinho 62' (pen.); Santos (yellow card) 68'	Report	Salyuk (yellow card) 57'; Kalyuzhnyi (yellow card) 65'; Varakuta (yellow card) 68'; Shabanov (yellow card) 72'	Stadium: Arena Lviv; Attendance: 3,970; Referee: Vitalii Romanov

5 April 2026 22	Shakhtar Donetsk	3–0	Rukh Lviv	Lviv
15:30 EEST (UTC+3)	Eguinaldo 34', 62'; Konoplya (yellow card) 82'; Meirelles 88'; Pedrinho (penalty missed) 90+4'	Report	Boyko (yellow card) 59'; Roman (yellow card) 71'; Neves (yellow card) 75'	Stadium: Arena Lviv; Attendance: 2,375; Referee: Andrii Kovalenko

13 April 2026 23	LNZ Cherkasy	2–2	Shakhtar Donetsk	Cherkasy
13:00 EEST (UTC+3)	Bondar 28' (o.g.); Assinor 45+4'	Report	Ryabov 11' (o.g.); Eguinaldo 34'; Alisson (yellow card) 90'; Bondar (yellow card) 90+1'	Stadium: Cherkasy Arena; Attendance: 6,700; Referee: Oleksandr Shandor
Note: The 2nd half of the match was delayed for 40 minutes due to air raid alerts.

20 April 2026 24	Shakhtar Donetsk	1–0	Polissya Zhytomyr	Lviv
18:00 EEST (UTC+3)	Bondar 56'; Ocheretko (yellow card) 90+2'	Report	Braharu (yellow card) 84'	Stadium: Arena Lviv; Attendance: 3,270; Referee: Viktor Kopievskii

23 April 2026 21	Zorya Luhansk	1–2	Shakhtar Donetsk	Kyiv
15:30 EEST (UTC+3)	Malysh 51' (yellow card) 81'; Dryshlyuk (yellow card) 61'; Anđušić (yellow card) 81'; Jordan (yellow card) 90+6'; Kushnirenko (yellow card) 90+6'	Report	Obah 2'; Bondarenko 82' (pen.)	Stadium: Valeriy Lobanovskyi Dynamo Stadium; Attendance: 973; Referee: Dmytro Panchyshyn

26 April 2026 25	Kudrivka	1–3	Shakhtar Donetsk	Lviv
18:00 EEST (UTC+3)	Kozak 54' (yellow card) 62'	Report	Newerton 18'; Meirelles 37'; Bondarenko 57'	Stadium: Arena Lviv; Attendance: 465; Referee: Roman Blavatskyi

3 May 2026 26	Dynamo Kyiv	1–2	Shakhtar Donetsk	Kyiv
18:00 EEST (UTC+3)	Ponomarenko 13' (yellow card) 90'; Bilovar (yellow card) 46'	Report	Tobias (yellow card) 32'; Matviyenko (yellow card) 34'; Ferreira 50'; Traoré 69'	Stadium: Valeriy Lobanovskyi Dynamo Stadium; Attendance: 7,900; Referee: Oleksandr Afanasiev

10 May 2026 27	Poltava	0–4	Shakhtar Donetsk	Lviv
15:30 EEST (UTC+3)	Sukhoruchko (yellow card) 20'	Report	Kryskiv 45+3'; Isaque 56', 61' (yellow card) 86'; Traoré 67'	Stadium: Arena Lviv; Attendance: 4,166; Referee: Dmytro Yevtukhov

13 May 2026 28	Shakhtar Donetsk	3–1	Obolon Kyiv	Lviv
18:00 EEST (UTC+3)	Meirelles 10'; Ghram 14'; Newerton (yellow card) 86'; Azarovi (yellow card) 87'; Shved 90'	Report	Chekh (yellow card) 22' (goal) 43'; Lyakh (yellow card) 49'	Stadium: Arena Lviv; Attendance: 1,524; Referee: Mykola Balakin
Note: The match was delayed for 45 minutes. Later it has been interrupted in 17th minute for 50 minutes and again, in 25th minute for 37 minutes due to air raid alerts.

17 May 2026 29	Kryvbas Kryvyi Rih	2–3	Shakhtar Donetsk	Kryvyi Rih
13:00 EEST (UTC+3)	Araujo (yellow card) 23'; Vilivald (yellow card) 30'; Jones (yellow card) 52'; Herbert (yellow card) 57'; Mendoza 58'; Butenko (yellow card) 63'; Shevchenko 87'	Report	Isaque (yellow card) 33'; Traoré 41'; Obah 45', 68'	Stadium: Hirnyk Stadium; Attendance: 2,130; Referee: Klym Zabroda

21 May 2026 30	Shakhtar Donetsk	0–1	Kolos Kovalivka	Lviv
15:30 EEST (UTC+3)		Report	Tahiri 49'	Stadium: Ukraina Stadium; Attendance: 1,245; Referee: Oleksandr Kalonov

=== Ukrainian Cup ===
17 September 2025 Round of 32	Polissya Stavky	0–1	Shakhtar Donetsk	Bucha
17:00 EEST (UTC+3)	Rudenko (yellow card) 78'	Report	Meirelles 45'; Isaque (yellow card) 82'	Stadium: Stadion Yuvileinyi; Attendance: 580; Referee: Dmytro Yevtukhov

29 October 2025 Round of 16	Dynamo Kyiv	2–1	Shakhtar Donetsk	Kyiv
18:00 EET (UTC+2)	Popov (yellow card) 17'; Yarmolenko 72'; Guerrero 79' (yellow card) 79'	Report	Meirelles 49'; Konoplya (yellow card) 83'	Stadium: Valeriy Lobanovskyi Dynamo Stadium; Attendance: 4,333; Referee: Dmytro Panchyshyn

=== UEFA Europa League ===
==== Qualifying phase ====
10 July 2025 First qualifying round 1st leg	Shakhtar Donetsk (Ukraine)	6–0	(Finland) Ilves	Ljubljana, Slovenia
21:00 EEST (UTC+3)	Alisson 26', 47'; Kauã Elias 43'; Kevin 74'; Pedrinho 87'; Newerton 90'	Report		Stadium: Stožice Stadium; Attendance: 650; Referee: Marc Nagtegaal (Netherlands)
Note: Due to the Russian invasion of Ukraine, Ukrainian teams were required to play their home matches at neutral venues until further notice.

17 July 2025 First qualifying round 2nd leg	Ilves (Finland)	0–0 (0–6 agg.)	(Ukraine) Shakhtar Donetsk	Tampere, Finland
19:00 EEST (UTC+3)	Jukkola (yellow card) 70'	Report	Tobias (yellow card) 40'	Stadium: Tammelan Stadion; Attendance: 7,315; Referee: Mohammad Usman Aslam (Norway)

24 July 2025 Second qualifying round 1st leg	Beşiktaş (Turkey)	2–4	(Ukraine) Shakhtar Donetsk	Istanbul, Turkey
21:00 EEST (UTC+3)	Abraham 40' (pen.); João Mário 87'; Uduokhai (yellow card) 79'; Yılmaz (yellow card) 90+1'; Günok (yellow card) 90+2'	Report	Alisson 7'; Eguinaldo 28'; Kevin 67', 90+6'; Riznyk (yellow card) 90+3'	Stadium: Beşiktaş Stadium; Attendance: 31,739; Referee: Georgi Kabakov (Bulgaria)

31 July 2025 Second qualifying round 2nd leg	Shakhtar Donetsk (Ukraine)	2–0 (6–2 agg.)	(Turkey) Beşiktaş	Kraków, Poland
21:00 EEST (UTC+3)	Kevin 12'; Matviyenko (yellow card) 36'; Kauã Elias 45+2'; Pedrinho (yellow card) 60'; Tobias (yellow card) 70'; Ocheretko (yellow card) 71'; Bondar (yellow card) 72'; Alisson (yellow card) 90+2'	Report	Tıknaz (yellow card) 16'; Gabriel (yellow card) 72'; Topçu (yellow card) 79'	Stadium: Henryk Reyman Municipal Stadium; Attendance: 12,828; Referee: Juan Martínez Munuera (Spain)
Note: Due to the Russian invasion of Ukraine, Ukrainian teams were required to play their home matches at neutral venues until further notice.

7 August 2025 Third qualifying round 1st leg	Panathinaikos (Greece)	0–0	(Ukraine) Shakhtar Donetsk	Athens, Greece
21:00 EEST (UTC+3)	Marlon (yellow card) 16'	Report	Chirivella (yellow card) 20'; Kyriakopoulos (yellow card) 46'	Stadium: Olympic Stadium; Attendance: 20,636; Referee: Erik Lambrechts (Belgium)

14 August 2025 Third qualifying round 2nd leg	Shakhtar Donetsk (Ukraine)	0–0 (0–0 agg.) (3–4 p)	(Greece) Panathinaikos	Kraków, Poland
21:00 EEST (UTC+3)	Bondar (yellow card) 28'; Ocheretko (yellow card) 48' (yellow-red card) 82'; Nazaryna (yellow card) 111'	Report	Gnezda Čerin (yellow card) 52'; Kotsiras (yellow card) 92'; Chirivella (yellow card) 97'; Siopis (yellow card) 105+1'; Touba (yellow card) 120+2'; Maksimović (yellow card) 120+2'	Stadium: Henryk Reyman Municipal Stadium; Attendance: 13,387; Referee: Daniel Siebert (Germany)
	Penalties
	Nazaryna (penalty missed); Tobias (penalty scored); Bondarenko (penalty scored); Newerton (penalty scored); Kauã Elias (penalty missed); Pedro Henrique (penalty missed)		(penalty scored) Ioannidis; (penalty scored) Jeremejeff; (penalty missed) Siopis; (penalty scored) Chirivella; (penalty missed) Zaroury; (penalty scored) Mancini
Note: Due to the Russian invasion of Ukraine, Ukrainian teams were required to play their home matches at neutral venues until further notice.

=== UEFA Conference League ===
==== Qualifying phase ====
21 August 2025 Play-off round 1st leg	Shakhtar Donetsk (Ukraine)	1–1	(Switzerland) Servette	Kraków, Poland
21:00 EEST (UTC+3)	Tobias (yellow card) 59'; Bondar 73'	Report	Fomba 8'; Njoh (yellow card) 59'	Stadium: Henryk Reyman Municipal Stadium; Attendance: 8,392; Referee: Nick Walsh (Scotland)
Note: Due to the Russian invasion of Ukraine, Ukrainian teams were required to play their home matches at neutral venues until further notice.

28 August 2025 Play-off round 2nd leg	Servette (Switzerland)	1–2 (2–3 agg.)	(Ukraine) Shakhtar Donetsk	Genève, Switzerland
22:00 EEST (UTC+3)	Stevanović (yellow card) 29'; Njoh 53' (yellow card) 54'; Magnin (yellow card) 90'; Ondoua (yellow card) 119'; Bronn (yellow card) 120+4'	Report	Kevin 70' (pen.) (yellow card) 90+3'; Kauã Elias 113' (yellow card) 114'; Pedrinho (yellow card) 119'	Stadium: Stade de Genève; Attendance: 13,224; Referee: Guillermo Cuadra Fernández (Spain)

==== League phase ====
Pos	Team	Pld	W	D	L	GF	GA	GD	Pts	Qualification
4	(Football Association of the Czech Republic) Sparta Prague	6	4	1	1	10	3	+7	13	Advance to round of 16 (seeded)
5	(Royal Spanish Football Federation) Rayo Vallecano	6	4	1	1	13	7	+6	13	Advance to round of 16 (seeded)
6	(Ukrainian Association of Football) Shakhtar Donetsk	6	4	1	1	10	5	+5	13	Advance to round of 16 (seeded)
7	(German Football Association) Mainz 05	6	4	1	1	7	3	+4	13	Advance to round of 16 (seeded)
8	(Cyprus Football Association) AEK Larnaca	6	3	3	0	7	1	+6	12	Advance to round of 16 (seeded)

Source: UEFA
Rules for classification: League phase tiebreakers

2 October 2025 1	Aberdeen (Scotland)	2–3	(Ukraine) Shakhtar Donetsk	Aberdeen, Scotland
22:00 EEST (UTC+3)	Karlsson 8' (pen.) (yellow card) 49'; Devlin 69' (yellow card) 75'; Lazetić (yellow card) 67'; Nilsen (yellow card) 70'	Report	Pedro Henrique (yellow card) 20' (goal) 60'; Nazaryna 38'; Ferreira 54'; Matviyenko (yellow card) 67'; Bondar (yellow card) 89'; Tobias (yellow card) 90+2'	Stadium: Pittodrie Stadium; Attendance: 15,504; Referee: Duje Strukan (Croatia)

23 October 2025 2	Shakhtar Donetsk (Ukraine)	1–2	(Poland) Legia Warsaw	Kraków, Poland
19:45 EEST (UTC+3)	Marlon (yellow card) 33'; Meirelles 61'; Konoplya (yellow card) 82'; Nazaryna (yellow card) 90+3'	Report	Augustyniak 16', 90+4'; Rajović (yellow card) 43'	Stadium: Henryk Reyman Municipal Stadium; Attendance: 13,936; Referee: Gustavo Correia (Portugal)
Note: Due to the Russian invasion of Ukraine, Ukrainian teams were required to play their home matches at neutral venues until further notice.

6 November 2025 3	Shakhtar Donetsk (Ukraine)	2–0	(Iceland) Breiðablik	Kraków, Poland
19:45 EET (UTC+2)	Bondarenko 28'; Kauã Elias 65'	Report	V.Einarsson (yellow card) 64'	Stadium: Henryk Reyman Municipal Stadium; Attendance: 5,252; Referee: Andrei Chivulete (Romania)
Note: Due to the Russian invasion of Ukraine, Ukrainian teams were required to play their home matches at neutral venues until further notice.

27 November 2025 4	Shamrock Rovers (Republic of Ireland)	1–2	(Ukraine) Shakhtar Donetsk	Dublin, Republic of Ireland
22:00 EET (UTC+2)	Pico (yellow card) 76'; Malley 87'	Report	Kauã Elias 23'; Nazaryna 77'	Stadium: Tallaght Stadium; Attendance: 9,226; Referee: Filip Glova (Slovakia)

11 December 2025 5	Hamrun Spartans (Malta)	0–2	(Ukraine) Shakhtar Donetsk	Ta' Qali, Malta
22:00 EET (UTC+2)	Mbong (yellow card) 52'; García (yellow card) 58'	Report	Konoplya (yellow card) 10'; Ocheretko (yellow card) 50'; Meirelles 61'; Isaque 64'; Eguinaldo (yellow card) 90'	Stadium: National Stadium; Attendance: 2,578; Referee: Florian Badstübner (Germany)
Note: Hamrun Spartans will play their home matches at National Stadium, Ta' Qali, instead of their regular stadium, Victor Tedesco Stadium, Hamrun, which did not meet UEFA requirements.

18 December 2025 6	Shakhtar Donetsk (Ukraine)	0–0	(Croatia) Rijeka	Kraków, Poland
22:00 EET (UTC+2)	Bondar (yellow card) 51'	Report	Oreč (yellow card) 55'; Radeljić (yellow card) 72'; Ndockyt (yellow card) 78'	Stadium: Henryk Reyman Municipal Stadium; Attendance: 4,367; Referee: Anthony Taylor (England)
Note: Due to the Russian invasion of Ukraine, Ukrainian teams were required to play their home matches at neutral venues until further notice.

==== Knockout phase ====
12 March 2026 Round of 16 1st leg	Lech Poznań (Poland)	1–3	(Ukraine) Shakhtar Donetsk	Poznań, Poland
19:45 EET (UTC+2)	Ishak 70'	Report	Marlon 36' (yellow card) 37'; Newerton 48' (yellow card) 74'; Bondar (yellow card) 74'; Isaque 85' (yellow card) 90'	Stadium: Poznań Stadium; Attendance: 36,290; Referee: Rohit Saggi (Norway)

19 March 2026 Round of 16 2nd leg	Shakhtar Donetsk (Ukraine)	1–2 (4–3 agg.)	(Poland) Lech Poznań	Kraków, Poland
22:00 EET (UTC+2)	Ghram (yellow card) 49' (yellow-red card) 90+7'; Moutinho 67' (o.g.)	Report	Ishak 13', 45+7' (pen.) (yellow card) 90+7'	Stadium: Henryk Reyman Municipal Stadium; Attendance: 17,754; Referee: Sander van der Eijk (Netherlands)
Note: Due to the Russian invasion of Ukraine, Ukrainian teams were required to play their home matches at neutral venues until further notice.

9 April 2026 Quarter-final 1st leg	Shakhtar Donetsk (Ukraine)	3–0	(Netherlands) AZ	Kraków, Poland
22:00 EEST (UTC+3)	Penetra (yellow card) 48' de Wit (yellow card) 64'	Report	Pedro Henrique (yellow card) 59'; Pedrinho 72'; Alisson 81', 83'	Stadium: Henryk Reyman Municipal Stadium; Attendance: 9,004; Referee: Nick Walsh (Scotland)
Note: Due to the Russian invasion of Ukraine, Ukrainian teams were required to play their home matches at neutral venues until further notice.

16 April 2026 Quarter-final 2nd leg	AZ (Netherlands)	2-2 (2–5 agg.)	(Ukraine) Shakhtar Donetsk	Alkmaar, Netherlands
22:00 EEST (UTC+3)	Chávez (yellow card) 31' van Duijl (yellow card) 33'; Boogaard (yellow card) 35'; Sadiq (yellow card) 45+2'; Jensen 73'; Šín 80'	Report	Isaque (yellow card) 24'; Alisson 58'; Tobias (yellow card) 71'; Eguinaldo (yellow card) 78'; Meirelles 83'; Matviyenko (yellow card) 85'	Stadium: AFAS Stadion; Attendance: 15,439; Referee: Sven Jablonski (Germany)

30 April 2026 Semi-final 1st leg	Shakhtar Donetsk (Ukraine)	1-3	(England) Crystal Palace	Kraków, Poland
22:00 EEST (UTC+3)	Ocheretko (yellow card) 31' (goal) 47'; Tobias (yellow card) 38'; Pedro Henrique (yellow card) 52'	Report	Sarr 1'; Pino (yellow card) 44'; Canvot (yellow card) 56'; Kamada 58'; Larsen 84'	Stadium: Henryk Reyman Municipal Stadium; Attendance: 29,842; Referee: Felix Zwayer (Germany)
Note: Due to the Russian invasion of Ukraine, Ukrainian teams were required to play their home matches at neutral venues until further notice.

7 May 2026 Semi-final 2nd leg	Crystal Palace (England)	2-1 (5-2 agg.)	(Ukraine) Shakhtar Donetsk	London, England
22:00 EEST (UTC+3)	Pedro Henrique 25' (o.g.); Sarr 52'	Report	Bondar (yellow card) 15'; Eguinaldo 34'	Stadium: Selhurst Park; Attendance: 23,080; Referee: Alejandro Hernández Hernández (Spain)

== Squad statistics ==
As of match played 21 May 2026

=== Appearances and goals ===
No.	Pos	Nat	Player	Total		Premier League		Ukrainian Cup		Europa League		Conference League	
No.	Pos	Nat	Player	Apps	Goals	Apps	Goals	Apps	Goals	Apps	Goals	Apps	Goals
2	FW	(Burkina Faso) BFA	Lassina Traoré	19	7	10+3	7	0	0	1+1	0	0+4	0
3	DF	(Bolivia) BOL	Diego Arroyo	1	0	0+1	0	0	0	0	0	0	0
4	DF	(Brazil) BRA	Marlon Santos	16	0	11+1	0	0+1	0	0	0	2+1	0
5	DF	(Ukraine) UKR	Valeriy Bondar	46	4	24+3	3	1+1	0	6	0	11	1
6	MF	(Brazil) BRA	Marlon Gomes	35	2	16+3	1	1	0	5	0	8+2	1
7	FW	(Brazil) BRA	Eguinaldo	27	9	11+4	7	1	0	2+1	1	4+4	1
8	MF	(Ukraine) UKR	Dmytro Kryskiv	17	1	7+6	1	1	0	0	0	2+1	0
9	MF	(Ukraine) UKR	Maryan Shved	11	1	0+5	1	1	0	0+3	0	1+1	0
10	MF	(Brazil) BRA	Pedrinho	38	8	19+3	6	1	0	2+3	1	9+1	1
11	MF	(Brazil) BRA	Newerton	41	7	17+6	5	2	0	3+3	1	7+3	1
13	DF	(Brazil) BRA	Pedro Henrique	40	1	21+2	0	1	0	5	0	10+1	1
14	MF	(Brazil) BRA	Isaque	38	7	8+16	5	1+1	0	0	0	6+6	2
16	DF	(Georgia (country)) GEO	Irakli Azarovi	20	0	11+3	0	0	0	1	0	4+1	0
17	DF	(Brazil) BRA	Vinicius Tobias	40	2	8+11	2	1	0	4+2	0	12+2	0
18	DF	(Tunisia) TUN	Alaa Ghram	17	1	7+2	1	1	0	1	0	4+2	0
19	FW	(Brazil) BRA	Kauã Elias	36	11	9+9	6	0+1	0	4+1	2	10+2	3
21	MF	(Ukraine) UKR	Artem Bondarenko	42	5	21+5	4	0+1	0	3+3	0	4+5	1
22	DF	(Ukraine) UKR	Mykola Matviyenko	43	0	20+7	0	1	0	5	0	10	0
23	GK	(Ukraine) UKR	Kiril Fesyun	8	0	3	0	1	0	0	0	4	0
24	MF	(Ukraine) UKR	Viktor Tsukanov	3	0	0+3	0	0	0	0	0	0	0
26	DF	(Ukraine) UKR	Yukhym Konoplya	27	2	15+3	2	1	0	2	0	2+4	0
27	MF	(Ukraine) UKR	Oleh Ocheretko	46	4	20+8	3	1	0	5+1	0	9+2	1
29	MF	(Ukraine) UKR	Yehor Nazaryna	34	3	11+8	1	1	0	0+3	0	7+4	2
30	FW	(Brazil) BRA	Alisson Santana	25	7	8+3	1	0+1	0	5	3	8	3
31	GK	(Ukraine) UKR	Dmytro Riznyk	41	0	24	0	1	0	6	0	10	0
34	GK	(Ukraine) UKR	Rostyslav Bahlay	1	0	1	0	0	0	0	0	0	0
37	MF	(Brazil) BRA	Lucas Ferreira	30	3	5+11	2	1+1	0	0	0	4+8	1
48	GK	(Ukraine) UKR	Denys Tvardovskyi	2	0	2	0	0	0	0	0	0	0
49	FW	(Brazil) BRA	Luca Meirelles	29	11	10+10	6	1+1	2	0	0	3+4	3
68	MF	(Nigeria) NGR	Prosper Obah	12	3	6+5	3	0	0	0	0	0+1	0
Players away on loan:
10	MF	(Ukraine) UKR	Heorhiy Sudakov	10	0	3	0	0	0	3+2	0	2	0
12	DF	(Georgia (country)) GEO	Giorgi Gocholeishvili	4	0	1	0	0	0	0+3	0	0	0
20	MF	(Ukraine) UKR	Anton Hlushchenko	5	1	0+2	1	1	0	0	0	0+2	0
74	DF	(Ukraine) UKR	Maryan Faryna	2	0	0	0	1	0	0	0	0+1	0
Players who left Shakhtar Donetsk during the season:
11	MF	(Brazil) BRA	Kevin	5	5	0	0	0	0	3	4	1+1	1

=== Goalscorers ===
Place	Position	Nation	Number	Name	Premier League	Ukrainian Cup	Europa League	Conference League	Total
1	FW	(Brazil)	49	Luca Meirelles	6	2	0	3	11
1	FW	(Brazil)	19	Kauã Elias	6	0	2	3	11
3	FW	(Brazil)	7	Eguinaldo	7	0	1	1	9
3	MF	(Brazil)	10	Pedrinho	6	0	1	1	8
5	FW	(Burkina Faso)	2	Lassina Traoré	7	0	0	0	7
5	MF	(Brazil)	11	Newerton	5	0	1	1	7
5	MF	(Brazil)	14	Isaque	5	0	0	2	7
5	FW	(Brazil)	30	Alisson Santana	1	0	3	3	7
9	MF	(Ukraine)	21	Artem Bondarenko	4	0	0	1	5
9	MF	(Brazil)	11	Kevin	0	0	4	1	5
11	DF	(Ukraine)	5	Valeriy Bondar	3	0	0	1	4
11	MF	(Ukraine)	27	Oleh Ocheretko	3	0	0	1	4
11				Own goal	3	0	0	1	4
14	MF	(Nigeria)	68	Prosper Obah	3	0	0	0	3
14	MF	(Brazil)	37	Lucas Ferreira	2	0	0	1	3
14	MF	(Ukraine)	29	Yehor Nazaryna	1	0	0	2	3
17	DF	(Ukraine)	26	Yukhym Konoplya	2	0	0	0	2
17	DF	(Brazil)	17	Vinicius Tobias	2	0	0	0	2
17	MF	(Brazil)	6	Marlon Gomes	1	0	0	1	2
20	MF	(Ukraine)	20	Anton Hlushchenko	1	0	0	0	1
20	MF	(Ukraine)	8	Dmytro Kryskiv	1	0	0	0	1
20	DF	(Tunisia)	18	Alaa Ghram	1	0	0	0	1
20	MF	(Ukraine)	9	Maryan Shved	1	0	0	0	1
20	DF	(Brazil)	13	Pedro Henrique	0	0	0	1	1
TOTALS					71	2	12	24	108

=== Clean sheets ===
Place	Position	Nation	Number	Name	Premier League	Ukrainian Cup	Europa League	Conference League	Total
1	GK	(Ukraine)	31	Dmytro Riznyk	16	0	5	2	23
2	GK	(Ukraine)	23	Kiril Fesyun	1	1	0	3	5
TOTALS					17	1	5	5	28

=== Disciplinary record ===
Number	Nation	Position	Name	Premier League		Ukrainian Cup		Europa League		Conference League		Total	
Number	Nation	Position	Name	Booked	Sent off (straight red)	Booked	Sent off (straight red)	Booked	Sent off (straight red)	Booked	Sent off (straight red)	Booked	Sent off (straight red)
4	(Brazil)	DF	Marlon Santos	2	0	0	0	0	0	0	0	2	0
5	(Ukraine)	DF	Valeriy Bondar	3	0	0	0	2	0	4	0	9	0
6	(Brazil)	MF	Marlon Gomes	4	0	0	0	1	0	2	0	7	0
7	(Brazil)	FW	Eguinaldo	1	0	0	0	0	0	2	0	3	0
8	(Ukraine)	MF	Dmytro Kryskiv	1	0	0	0	0	0	0	0	1	0
10	(Brazil)	MF	Pedrinho	1	0	0	0	1	0	1	0	3	0
11	(Brazil)	MF	Newerton	3	0	0	0	0	0	1	0	4	0
13	(Brazil)	DF	Pedro Henrique	1	0	0	0	0	0	3	0	4	0
14	(Brazil)	MF	Isaque	3	0	1	0	0	0	2	0	6	0
16	(Georgia (country))	DF	Irakli Azarovi	2	0	0	0	0	0	0	0	2	0
17	(Brazil)	DF	Vinicius Tobias	1	0	0	0	2	0	4	0	7	0
18	(Tunisia)	DF	Alaa Ghram	0	0	0	0	0	0	2	1	2	1
19	(Brazil)	FW	Kauã Elias	0	0	0	0	0	0	1	0	1	0
22	(Ukraine)	DF	Mykola Matviyenko	1	0	0	0	1	0	2	0	4	0
26	(Ukraine)	DF	Yukhym Konoplya	3	0	1	0	0	0	2	0	6	0
27	(Ukraine)	MF	Oleh Ocheretko	4	0	0	0	3	1	2	0	9	1
29	(Ukraine)	MF	Yehor Nazaryna	0	0	0	0	1	0	1	0	2	0
30	(Brazil)	FW	Alisson Santana	2	0	0	0	1	0	0	0	3	0
31	(Ukraine)	GK	Dmytro Riznyk	0	0	0	0	1	0	0	0	1	0
49	(Brazil)	FW	Luca Meirelles	2	0	0	0	0	0	0	0	2	0
Players away on loan:
20	(Ukraine)	MF	Anton Hlushchenko	1	0	0	0	0	0	0	0	1	0
Players who left Shakhtar Donetsk during the season:
11	(Brazil)	MF	Kevin	0	0	0	0	0	0	1	0	1	0
			TOTALS	35	0	2	0	13	1	30	1	80	2
