= 2026–27 FC Shakhtar Donetsk season =

Shakhtar Donetsk
2026–27 season
- Chairman: Rinat Akhmetov
- Manager: Arda Turan
- Stadium: Arena Lviv (League); Stamford Bridge (Europe)
- Premier League: 2nd
- Ukrainian Cup: Round of 16
- UEFA Champions League: Group Stage
- Top goalscorer: League: Kauã Elias (3); All: Kauã Elias (3)
Home colours	Away colours

The 2026–27 season is FC Shakhtar Donetsk's 36th season in existence and the club's 28th consecutive season in the top flight of Ukrainian football. In addition to the domestic league, Shakhtar Donetsk will participate in the Ukrainian Cup and the UEFA Champions League. The season covers the period from 1 July 2026 to 30 June 2027.

== Season events ==
=== Preseason ===
On 18 April, Shakhtar announced the signing of Bruninho from Athletico Paranaense to a three-year contract, with Bruninho joining the club in August 2026 once he turns 18.

On 22 May, Shakhtar announced the signing of Gleiker Mendoza from Kryvbas Kryvyi Rih on a contract until 30 June 2031.

On 10 June, Shakhtar announced the free-transfer signing of Oleksandr Karavayev from Dynamo Kyiv on a contract until 30 June 2028.

On 20 June, Shakhtar announced the signing of Ryan Roberto from Flamengo, on a contract until 30 June 2031.

On 30 June, Shakhtar announced that Mykola Ogarkov had been loaned to Kudrivka for the 2026–27 season.

On 3 July, Shakhtar announced that they had extended their contract with Muhamadou Kanteh until 30 June 2031.

=== August ===
On 2 August, Kyrylo Siheyev and Oleksandr Yushchenko joined Kudrivka on loan for the season.

On 15 August, Shakhtar announced that they had extended their contract with Dmytro Riznyk until 31 July 2031, and with Isaque Silva until 31 August 2031.

On 20 August, Shakhtar announced that Giorgi Gocholeishvili had joined Cádiz on loan for the season, with an option to make the move permanent, and that they had signed Gabriel Carvalho on loan for the season from Al Qadsiah also with the option to make the move permanent.

On 21 August, Shakhtar announced that they would play their UEFA Champions League home matches at Stamford Bridge for the 2026–27 season. Also on 21 August, Artem Bondarenko joined Al-Ahli of the Saudi Pro League on loan until 30 June 2027 with the option to make the move permanent.

On 23 August, Shakhtar announced that Diego Arroyo had joined Hapoel Petah Tikva on loan for the season.

On 26 August, Shakhtar announced the signing of Alan Matturro from Genoa, on a contract until 31 July 2031.

On 27 August, Shakhtar announced that they had extended their contract with Valeriy Bondar for another five-years, until 31 July 2031.

=== October ===
On 26 October, Shakhtar announced that they had extended their contract with Yehor Nazaryna until 31 December 2029.

== Squad ==
As of match played 8 November 2026

Number	Player	Nationality	Position	Date of birth (age)	Signed from	Signed in	Contract ends	Apps.	Goals
Goalkeepers
23	Kiril Fesyun	(Ukraine)	GK	7 August 2002 (age 24)	Kolos Kovalivka	2024	2029	15	0
31	Dmytro Riznyk	(Ukraine)	GK	30 January 1999 (age 27)	Vorskla Poltava	2023	2028	133	0
34	Rostyslav Bahlay	(Ukraine)	GK	1 February 2008 (age 18)	Academy	2024		1	0
48	Denys Tvardovskyi	(Ukraine)	GK	13 June 2003 (age 23)	Academy	2023		5	0
	Tymur Puzankov	(Ukraine)	GK	4 March 2003 (age 23)	Academy	2021		0	0
Defenders
4	Marlon Santos	(Brazil)	DF	7 September 1995 (age 31)	Unattached	2025	2028	39	0
5	Valeriy Bondar	(Ukraine)	DF	27 February 1999 (age 27)	Academy	2019	2031	203	7
13	Pedro Henrique	(Brazil)	DF	11 July 2002 (age 24)	Athletico Paranaense	2023	2030	97	2
16	Irakli Azarovi	(Georgia (country))	DF	21 February 2002 (age 24)	Red Star Belgrade	2023	2028	72	0
17	Vinicius Tobias	(Brazil)	DF	23 February 2004 (age 22)	Internacional	2022	2029	81	4
18	Alaa Ghram	(Tunisia)	DF	24 July 2001 (age 25)	CS Sfaxien	2024	2029	37	1
22	Mykola Matviyenko	(Ukraine)	DF	2 May 1996 (age 30)	Academy	2015	2027	190	17
28	Alan Matturro	(Uruguay)	DF	11 October 2004 (age 22)	Genoa	2026	2031	2	0
Midfielders
6	Marlon Gomes	(Brazil)	MF	14 December 2003 (age 22)	Vasco da Gama	2024	2028	93	10
7	Eguinaldo	(Brazil)	FW	9 August 2004 (age 22)	Vasco da Gama	2023	2028	84	19
8	Dmytro Kryskiv	(Ukraine)	MF	6 October 2000 (age 26)	Academy	2019	2030	119	13
10	Pedrinho	(Brazil)	MF	13 April 1998 (age 28)	Benfica	2021	2029	97	16
11	Newerton	(Brazil)	MF	3 June 2005 (age 21)	São Paulo	2023	2028	100	14
14	Isaque	(Brazil)	MF	24 February 2007 (age 19)	Fluminense	2025	2031	53	9
20	Oleksandr Karavayev	(Ukraine)	MF	2 June 1992 (age 34)	Dynamo Kyiv	2026	2028	9	0
24	Viktor Tsukanov	(Ukraine)	MF	4 February 2006 (age 20)	Academy	2024	2028	14	1
27	Oleh Ocheretko	(Ukraine)	MF	25 March 2003 (age 23)	Academy	2020	2030	78	7
29	Yehor Nazaryna	(Ukraine)	MF	10 July 1997 (age 29)	Zorya Luhansk	2022	2029	117	8
37	Lucas Ferreira	(Brazil)	MF	28 April 2006 (age 20)	São Paulo	2025	2030	38	4
45	Denys Smetana	(Ukraine)	MF	3 July 2006 (age 20)	Academy	2026		1	0
68	Prosper Obah	(Nigeria)	MF	24 November 2003 (age 22)	LNZ Cherkasy	2025	2030	15	3
77	Gleiker Mendoza	(Venezuela)	MF	8 December 2001 (age 24)	Kryvbas Kryvyi Rih	2026	2031	15	3
Forwards
2	Lassina Traoré	(Burkina Faso)	FW	12 January 2001 (age 25)	Ajax	2021	2031	126	31
9	Kauã Elias	(Brazil)	FW	28 March 2006 (age 20)	Fluminense	2025	2029	60	15
25	Gabriel Carvalho	(Brazil)	FW	17 August 2007 (age 19)	on loan from Al Qadsiah	2026	2027	2	1
30	Alisson Santana	(Brazil)	FW	21 September 2005 (age 21)	Atlético Mineiro	2025	2030	53	13
49	Luca Meirelles	(Brazil)	FW	15 March 2007 (age 19)	Santos	2025	2030	42	13
71	Ryan Roberto	(Brazil)	FW	5 March 2008 (age 18)	Flamengo	2026	2031	1	0
99	Bruninho	(Brazil)	FW	16 August 2008 (age 18)	Athletico Paranaense	2026	2029	5	0
	Muhamadou Kanteh	(The Gambia)	FW	15 April 2007 (age 19)	Academy	2024	2031	0	0
Also under contract
	Maryan Faryna	(Ukraine)	DF	28 August 2003 (age 23)	Academy	2022		8	0
	Viktor Korniyenko	(Ukraine)	DF	14 February 1999 (age 27)	Academy	2016		30	1
	Roman Savchenko	(Ukraine)	DF	17 February 2004 (age 22)	Academy	2021		0	0
	Anton Hlushchenko	(Ukraine)	MF	20 April 2004 (age 22)	Academy	2022		11	2
	Maryan Shved	(Ukraine)	MF	16 July 1997 (age 29)	KV Mechelen	2022	2027	54	9
Away on loan
3	Diego Arroyo	(Bolivia)	DF	29 April 2005 (age 21)	Club Bolívar	2025	2029	2	0
12	Giorgi Gocholeishvili	(Georgia (country))	DF	14 February 2001 (age 25)	Saburtalo Tbilisi	2023	2027	40	1
21	Artem Bondarenko	(Ukraine)	MF	21 August 2000 (age 26)	Academy	2020	2028	168	33
32	Eduard Kozik	(Ukraine)	DF	19 April 2003 (age 23)	Academy	2021		8	0
55	Luka Latsabidze	(Georgia (country))	DF	18 March 2004 (age 22)	Dinamo Tbilisi	2024	2028	0	0
65	Mykola Ogarkov	(Ukraine)	DF	18 February 2005 (age 21)	Academy	2024		1	0
77	Khusrav Toirov	(Tajikistan)	MF	1 August 2004 (age 22)	Atyrau	2023	2027	2	0
	Danylo Udod	(Ukraine)	DF	9 March 2004 (age 22)	Academy	2021		0	0
	Ivan Losenko	(Ukraine)	MF	24 July 2004 (age 22)	Academy	2024		0	0
	Kyrylo Siheyev	(Ukraine)	MF	16 May 2004 (age 22)	Academy	2021		0	0
	Oleksandr Yushchenko	(Ukraine)	MF	7 May 2005 (age 21)	Academy	2026		0	0
Players who left during the season

== Transfers ==
=== In ===
Date	Position	Nationality	Name	From	Fee	Ref.
22 May 2026 (Note: Transfer announced on the shown date, becoming official on 1 July 2026.)	MF	(Venezuela)	Gleiker Mendoza	Kryvbas Kryvyi Rih	Undisclosed	
10 June 2026	MF	(Ukraine)	Oleksandr Karavayev	Dynamo Kyiv	Free	
20 June 2026	FW	(Brazil)	Ryan Roberto	Flamengo	Undisclosed	
16 August 2026	FW	(Brazil)	Bruninho	Athletico Paranaense	Undisclosed	
26 August 2026	DF	(Uruguay)	Alan Matturro	Genoa	Undisclosed	

=== Loans in ===
Date from	Position	Nationality	Name	From	Date to	Ref.
20 August 2026	FW	(Brazil)	Gabriel Carvalho	Al Qadsiah	30 June 2027	

=== Out ===
Date	Position	Nationality	Name	To	Fee	Ref.
1 July 2026	MF	(Ukraine)	Heorhiy Sudakov	Benfica	€20,250,000 (Note: €5,000,000 in potential addons and a 25% sell on fee.)	

=== Loans out ===
Date from	Position	Nationality	Name	To	Date to	Ref.
30 December 2025	MF	(Ukraine)	Ivan Losenko	CF Montréal	30 December 2026	
18 February 2026	MF	(Tajikistan)	Khusrav Toirov	Istiklol	30 November 2026	
30 June 2026	MF	(Ukraine)	Mykola Ogarkov	Kudrivka	30 June 2027	
2 August 2026	MF	(Ukraine)	Kyrylo Siheyev	Kudrivka	30 June 2027	
2 August 2026	MF	(Ukraine)	Oleksandr Yushchenko	Kudrivka	30 June 2027	
20 August 2026	DF	(Georgia (country))	Giorgi Gocholeishvili	Cádiz	30 June 2027	
21 August 2026	MF	(Ukraine)	Artem Bondarenko	Al-Ahli	30 June 2027	
23 August 2026	DF	(Bolivia)	Diego Arroyo	Hapoel Petah Tikva	30 June 2027	

== Friendlies ==
19 July 2026	Shakhtar Donetsk	5–0	NK Rudeš	Brdo, Slovenia
EET (UTC+3)	Nazaryna 18'; Bruninho 58', 79'; Newerton 64'; Pedrinho 73'	Report		Stadium: National Football Center; Attendance: 100

21 July 2026	Shakhtar Donetsk	2–2	Slaven Belupo	Radomlje, Slovenia
19:00 EET (UTC+3)	Alisson 56'; Karavayev 88'	Report	Petrović 63', 69'	Stadium: Sports Park; Attendance: 100

23 July 2026	Shakhtar Donetsk	2–0	HNK Gorica	Domzale, Slovenia
19:00 EET (UTC+3)	Pedrinho 40'; Alisson 52'	Report		Stadium: Domžale Sports Park; Attendance: 100

25 July 2026	Shakhtar Donetsk	0–0	Al-Ula	Brdo, Slovenia
19:00 EET (UTC+3)		Report		Stadium: National Football Center; Attendance: 50

26 July 2026	Bursaspor	0–0	Shakhtar Donetsk	Bursa
19:00 EET (UTC+3)		Report		Stadium: Centennial Atatürk Stadium; Attendance: 43,000

23 August 2026	Shakhtar Donetsk	3–0	Nyva Ternopil	Vynnyky
EET (UTC+3)	Karavayev 14'; Meirelles 40'; Mendoza 58'	Report		Stadium: Emily Resort Hotel

23 August 2026	Shakhtar Donetsk	1–0	Kormil Yavoriv	Vynnyky
EET (UTC+3)	Marlon 31'	Report		Stadium: Emily Resort Hotel

== Competitions ==
=== Overall record ===
Competition	First match	Last match	Starting round	Record							
Competition	First match	Last match	Starting round	Pld	W	D	L	GF	GA	GD	Win %
Premier League	3 August 2026	2027	Matchday 1	12	9	2	1	22	5	+17	75.00
Ukrainian Cup	17 September 2026		Round of 32	2	2	0	0	6	0	+6	100.00
Champions League	10 September 2026		League Phase	4	1	1	2	4	4	+0	25.00
Total				18	12	3	3	32	9	+23	66.67

Last updated: 8 November 2026
Source: Results

=== Premier League ===
==== League table ====
Pos	Team	Pld	W	D	L	GF	GA	GD	Pts	Qualification or relegation
1	Shakhtar Donetsk	12	9	2	1	22	5	+17	29	Qualification for the Champions League second qualifying round
2	Polissya Zhytomyr	11	9	1	1	25	8	+17	28	Qualification for the Conference League second qualifying round
3	Dynamo Kyiv	11	7	2	2	16	9	+7	23	Qualification for the Conference League second qualifying round
4	Kharkiv	9	7	0	2	18	7	+11	21	Qualified for the Quarter-finals UC
5	Karpaty Lviv	11	5	4	2	22	8	+14	19	Qualified for the Quarter-finals UC

Updated to match(es) played on 8 November 2026. Source: upl.ua
Rules for classification: 1) Points; 2) Head-to-head points; 3) Head-to-head goal difference; 4) Head-to-head goals scored; 5) Goal difference; 6) Goals scored; 7) Draw or "Golden match" if two teams are tied for title (Article 22, paragraph 3).

Premier League teams	Agg.	First League teams	1st leg	2nd leg
	x–x			
	x–x			

=== First Semi-final ===
v

v

=== Second Semi-final ===
v

v

==== Results summary ====
Overall								Home						Away					
Pld	W	D	L	GF	GA	GD	Pts	W	D	L	GF	GA	GD	W	D	L	GF	GA	GD
12	9	2	1	22	5	+17	29	5	2	1	14	4	+10	4	0	0	8	1	+7

Last updated: 8 November 2026.
Source: Results

==== Results by round ====
Round	1	2	3	4	5	6	7	8	9	10	11	12
Ground	H	A	A	H	A	H	H	A	H	H	H	H
Result	W	W	W	L	W	W	W	W	W	D	W	D
Position	1	2	2	3	2	2	2	1	1	2	1	

Updated to match(es) played on 8 November 2026. Source: Results
A = Away; H = Home; W = Win; D = Draw; L = Loss

==== Results ====
3 August 2026 1	Shakhtar Donetsk	5–1	Kudrivka	Lviv
18:00 EEST (UTC+3)	Alisson 32'; Elias 55', 72', 90+2'; Mendoza (yellow card) 64'; Meirelles 81'	Report	Dumanyuk 42' (yellow card) 54'; Bychek (yellow card) 75'	Stadium: Arena Lviv; Attendance: 4,165; Referee: Dmytro Panchyshyn

9 August 2026 2	Epitsentr Kamianets-Podilskyi	0–2	Shakhtar Donetsk	Kamianets-Podilskyi
15:30 EEST (UTC+3)	Myronyuk (yellow card) 54'; Kyryukhantsev (yellow card) 76'	Report	Ocheretko 49'; Alisson (yellow card) 65'; Nazaryna 77'	Stadium: Tonkocheyev Stadium; Attendance: 3,272; Referee: Roman Blavatskyi

16 August 2026 3	Kharkiv	0–1	Shakhtar Donetsk	Zolochivska
15:30 EEST (UTC+3)	Smolyakov (yellow card) 50'	Report	Newerton 1'; Matviyenko (yellow card) 61'	Stadium: Arena Livyi Bereh; Attendance: 1,970; Referee: Oleksandr Shandor

29 August 2026 4	Shakhtar Donetsk	0–2	Polissya Zhytomyr	Lviv
18:00 EEST (UTC+3)		Report	Nazarenko 31'; Emërllahu (yellow card) 36'; Kravchenko (yellow card) 55'; Mykhaylichenko (yellow card) 72'; Andriyevskyi 74'	Stadium: Arena Lviv; Attendance: 4,164; Referee: Dmytro Panchyshyn

5 September 2026 5	Karpaty Lviv	1–2	Shakhtar Donetsk	Lviv
18:00 EEST (UTC+3)	Rusyn 12'; Moha (yellow card) 23'	Report	Meirelles 25'; Bondar (yellow card) 35'; Newerton (yellow card) 55'; Alisson 67'; Ferreira (yellow card) 81'	Stadium: Arena Lviv; Attendance: 11,200; Referee: Oleksandr Afanasiev

14 September 2026 6	Shakhtar Donetsk	2–0	Chornomorets Odesa	Lviv
18:00 EEST (UTC+3)	Ocheretko 13' (yellow card) 40'; Meirelles 34'	Report	Popov (yellow card) 12'; Robakidze (yellow card) 40'	Stadium: Arena Lviv; Attendance: 405; Referee: Maksym Kozyriatskyi

20 September 2026 7	Shakhtar Donetsk	3–0	LNZ Cherkasy	Lviv
18:00 EEST (UTC+3)	Alisson (yellow card) 33'; Pedrinho 63'; Newerton 70' (pen.); Isaque 83'	Report	Muravskyi (red card) 22'; Ledviy (yellow card) 69'	Stadium: Arena Lviv; Attendance: 4,117; Referee: Denys Shurman

9 October 2026 8	Veres Rivne	0–3	Shakhtar Donetsk	Rivne
15:30 EEST (UTC+3)	Baran (red card) 37'; Kharatin (yellow card) 39'	Report	Pedrinho 32'; Kryskiv (yellow card) 39'; Matviyenko 58' (yellow card) 68'; Pedro Henrique 71'; Isaque (yellow card) 90'	Stadium: Avanhard Stadium; Attendance: 4,200; Referee: Viktor Kopievskiy

17 October 2026 9	Shakhtar Donetsk	2–1	Kolos Kovalivka	Lviv
18:00 EEST (UTC+3)	Tobias 10' (yellow card) 51'; Bondar 36'	Report	Burda (yellow card) 60'; Tsurikov (yellow card) 62' (yellow-red card) 90'; Salabay (yellow card) 71'; Tahiri 84'	Stadium: Arena Lviv; Attendance: 3,288; Referee: Dmytro Panchyshyn

24 October 2026 10	Shakhtar Donetsk	0–0	Zorya Luhansk	Lviv
18:00 EEST (UTC+3)	Traoré (yellow card) 30'; Isaque (yellow card) 35'	Report	Budkivskyi (yellow card) 11'; Saputin (yellow card) 83'	Stadium: Arena Lviv; Attendance: 3,307; Referee: Roman Blavatskyi

30 October 2026 11	Shakhtar Donetsk	2–0	Obolon Kyiv	Lviv
18:00 EET (UTC+2)	Alisson (yellow card) 63' (goal) 70', 85'; Traoré (yellow card) 89'	Report		Stadium: Arena Lviv; Attendance: 2,534; Referee: Mykola Balakin

8 November 2026 12	Shakhtar Donetsk	0–0	Dynamo Kyiv	Lviv
18:00 EET (UTC+2)	Tobias (red card) 53'; Marlon (yellow card) 69'; Meirelles (yellow card) 85'	Report	Kędziora (yellow card) 28'; Sych (yellow card) 51'; Dubinchak (yellow card) 53'; Shaparenko (yellow card) 89'	Stadium: Arena Lviv; Attendance: 4,023; Referee: Dmytro Panchyshyn

20 November 2026 13	Shakhtar Donetsk	–	Livyi Bereh Kyiv	Lviv
EET (UTC+2)				Stadium: Arena Lviv

=== Ukrainian Cup ===
17 September 2026 Round of 32	SC Vilkhivtsi	0–3	Shakhtar Donetsk	Vilkhivtsi
15:00 EEST (UTC+3)		Report	Nazaryna 30'; Carvalho 44'; Tsukanov 72'	Stadium: Vilkhivtsi Arena-Park; Attendance: 2,128; Referee: Andrii Kovalenko

27 October 2026 Round of 16	Shakhtar Donetsk	3–0	Dynamo Kyiv	Lviv
18:00 EET (UTC+2)	Pedro Henrique (yellow card) 15'; Bondar (yellow card) 17'; Ocheretko (yellow card) 31'; Marlon (yellow card) 37'; Mendoza 43'; Isaque 74'; Newerton (yellow card) 80'; Alisson 87'	Report	Mykhavko (red card) 31'; Thiaré (red card) 90+2'; Guerrero (red card) FT	Stadium: Arena Lviv; Attendance: 4,160; Referee: Viktor Kopievskii

2-4 March 2027 Quarter-final	–
EET (UTC+2)

=== UEFA Champions League ===
==== League phase ====
Pos	Team	Pld	W	D	L	GF	GA	GD	Pts	Qualification
19	(Turkey) Fenerbahçe	4	1	2	1	6	11	−5	5	Advance to knockout phase play-offs (unseeded)
20	(Italy) Roma	4	1	1	2	10	8	+2	4	Advance to knockout phase play-offs (unseeded)
21	(Ukraine) Shakhtar Donetsk	4	1	1	2	4	4	0	4	Advance to knockout phase play-offs (unseeded)
22	(Norway) Viking	4	1	1	2	9	10	−1	4	Advance to knockout phase play-offs (unseeded)
23	(Spain) Atlético Madrid	4	1	1	2	4	5	−1	4	Advance to knockout phase play-offs (unseeded)

Updated to match(es) played on 4 November 2026. Source: UEFA
Rules for classification: League phase tiebreakers

10 September 2026 1	PSV Eindhoven (Netherlands)	1–1	(Ukraine) Shakhtar Donetsk	Eindhoven, Netherlands
19:45 EEST (UTC+3)	Dest 48', (yellow card) 81'; Obispo (yellow card) 56' van Bommel (yellow card) 65'	Report	Tobias (yellow card) 35'; Mendoza 45+1', (yellow card) 47'; Henrique (yellow card) 55'; Bondar (yellow card) 63'; Kryskiv (yellow card) 89'; Marlon (yellow card) 90+1'	Stadium: Philips Stadion; Attendance: 34,900; Referee: Halil Umut Meler (Turkey)

14 October 2026 2	Shakhtar Donetsk (Ukraine)	3–1	(Greece) AEK Athens	London, England
22:00 EEST (UTC+3)	Pedrinho 34' (pen.); Marlon (yellow card) 54'; Tobias 80'; Mendoza 86'	Report	Majer (yellow card) 18', (goal) 28'; Moukoudi (yellow card) 42'; Marin (yellow card) 61'; Varga (yellow card) 90'	Stadium: Stamford Bridge; Attendance: 21,119; Referee: Chris Kavanagh (England)
Note: Due to the Russian invasion of Ukraine, Ukrainian teams are required to play their home matches at neutral venues until further notice. Therefore, Shakhtar Donetsk will play their home matches at Stamford Bridge, London, England, instead of their regular stadium, Donbas Arena, Donetsk.

21 October 2026 3	Inter Milan (Italy)	1–0	(Ukraine) Shakhtar Donetsk	Milan, Italy
22:00 EEST (UTC+3)	Thuram (yellow card) 54'; Bastoni (yellow card) 66' (red card) 68'; Augusto 77'	Report	Ocheretko (yellow card) 36'; Marlon (yellow card) 68'	Stadium: San Siro; Attendance: 73,352; Referee: Harm Osmers (Germany)

3 November 2026 4	Shakhtar Donetsk (Ukraine)	0–1	(Portugal) Sporting CP	London, England
19:45 EET (UTC+2)	Silva (yellow card) 74'	Report	Doumbia 59'; Araújo (yellow card) 66'	Stadium: Stamford Bridge; Attendance: 28,260; Referee: Ivan Kružliak (Slovakia)
Note: Due to the Russian invasion of Ukraine, Ukrainian teams are required to play their home matches at neutral venues until further notice. Therefore, Shakhtar Donetsk will play their home matches at Stamford Bridge, London, England, instead of their regular stadium, Donbas Arena, Donetsk.

25 November 2026 5	Shakhtar Donetsk (Ukraine)	v	(Turkey) Fenerbahçe	London, England
22:00 EET (UTC+2)		Report		Stadium: Stamford Bridge
Note: Due to the Russian invasion of Ukraine, Ukrainian teams are required to play their home matches at neutral venues until further notice. Therefore, Shakhtar Donetsk will play their home matches at Stamford Bridge, London, England, instead of their regular stadium, Donbas Arena, Donetsk.

9 December 2026 6	Slovan Bratislava (Slovakia)	v	(Ukraine) Shakhtar Donetsk	Bratislava, Slovenia
19:45 EET (UTC+2)		Report		Stadium: Tehelné pole

20 January 2027 7	RB Leipzig (Germany)	v	(Ukraine) Shakhtar Donetsk	Leipzig, Austria
22:00 EET (UTC+2)		Report		Stadium: Red Bull Arena

27 January 2027 8	Shakhtar Donetsk (Ukraine)	v	(Spain) Real Madrid	London, England
22:00 EET (UTC+2)		Report		Stadium: Stamford Bridge
Note: Due to the Russian invasion of Ukraine, Ukrainian teams are required to play their home matches at neutral venues until further notice. Therefore, Shakhtar Donetsk will play their home matches at Stamford Bridge, London, England, instead of their regular stadium, Donbas Arena, Donetsk.

== Squad statistics ==
As of match played 8 November 2026

=== Appearances and goals ===
No.	Pos	Nat	Player	Total		Premier League		Ukrainian Cup		Champions League	
No.	Pos	Nat	Player	Apps	Goals	Apps	Goals	Apps	Goals	Apps	Goals
2	FW	(Burkina Faso) BFA	Lassina Traoré	11	0	5+2	0	0+1	0	0+3	0
4	DF	(Brazil) BRA	Marlon Santos	1	0	0	0	1	0	0	0
5	DF	(Ukraine) UKR	Valeriy Bondar	16	1	9+1	1	1+1	0	4	0
6	MF	(Brazil) BRA	Marlon Gomes	12	0	5+2	0	1	0	4	0
8	MF	(Ukraine) UKR	Dmytro Kryskiv	9	0	5+2	0	0+1	0	0+1	0
9	FW	(Brazil) BRA	Kauã Elias	14	3	4+4	3	2	0	4	0
10	MF	(Brazil) BRA	Pedrinho	7	3	3+2	2	0	0	2	1
11	MF	(Brazil) BRA	Newerton	16	2	7+4	2	0+1	0	1+3	0
13	DF	(Brazil) BRA	Pedro Henrique	15	1	10	1	1	0	4	0
14	MF	(Brazil) BRA	Isaque	15	2	6+4	1	0+1	1	1+3	0
16	DF	(Georgia (country)) GEO	Irakli Azarovi	5	0	1+2	0	1+1	0	0	0
17	DF	(Brazil) BRA	Vinicius Tobias	15	2	7+2	1	2	0	4	1
18	DF	(Tunisia) TUN	Alaa Ghram	7	0	5+1	0	0+1	0	0	0
20	MF	(Ukraine) UKR	Oleksandr Karavayev	9	0	6+3	0	0	0	0	0
22	DF	(Ukraine) UKR	Mykola Matviyenko	15	1	9+1	1	1	0	4	0
23	GK	(Ukraine) UKR	Kiril Fesyun	1	0	0	0	1	0	0	0
24	MF	(Ukraine) UKR	Viktor Tsukanov	3	0	0+2	0	1	0	0	0
25	FW	(Brazil) BRA	Gabriel Carvalho	3	1	1+1	0	0+1	1	0	0
27	MF	(Ukraine) UKR	Oleh Ocheretko	15	2	8+2	2	1	0	4	0
28	DF	(Uruguay) URU	Alan Matturro	2	0	1+1	0	0	0	0	0
29	MF	(Ukraine) UKR	Yehor Nazaryna	15	2	6+4	1	2	1	1+2	0
30	FW	(Brazil) BRA	Alisson Santana	15	5	7+3	4	1	1	4	0
31	GK	(Ukraine) UKR	Dmytro Riznyk	17	0	12	0	1	0	4	0
37	MF	(Brazil) BRA	Lucas Ferreira	8	1	1+4	1	0	0	0+3	0
45	MF	(Ukraine) UKR	Denys Smetana	1	0	0	0	1	0	0	0
49	FW	(Brazil) BRA	Luca Meirelles	13	2	3+7	2	0+1	0	0+2	0
68	MF	(Nigeria) NGR	Prosper Obah	3	0	1+1	0	1	0	0	0
71	FW	(Brazil) BRA	Ryan Roberto	1	0	0	0	1	0	0	0
77	MF	(Venezuela) VEN	Gleiker Mendoza	15	3	5+4	0	1+1	1	3+1	2
99	FW	(Brazil) BRA	Bruninho	5	0	3	0	1	0	0+1	0
Players away on loan:
21	MF	(Ukraine) UKR	Artem Bondarenko	3	0	2+1	0	0	0	0	0
Players who left Shakhtar Donetsk during the season:

=== Goalscorers ===
Place	Position	Nation	Number	Name	Premier League	Ukrainian Cup	Champions League	Total
1	FW	(Brazil)	30	Alisson Santana	4	1	0	5
2	FW	(Brazil)	9	Kauã Elias	3	0	0	3
2	MF	(Brazil)	10	Pedrinho	2	0	1	3
2	MF	(Venezuela)	77	Gleiker Mendoza	0	1	2	3
5	FW	(Brazil)	49	Luca Meirelles	2	0	0	2
5	MF	(Ukraine)	27	Oleh Ocheretko	2	0	0	2
5	MF	(Brazil)	11	Newerton	2	0	0	2
5	MF	(Ukraine)	29	Yehor Nazaryna	1	1	0	2
5	MF	(Brazil)	14	Isaque	1	1	0	2
5	DF	(Brazil)	17	Vinicius Tobias	1	0	1	2
11	MF	(Brazil)	37	Lucas Ferreira	1	0	0	1
11	DF	(Ukraine)	22	Mykola Matviyenko	1	0	0	1
11	DF	(Brazil)	13	Pedro Henrique	1	0	0	1
11	DF	(Ukraine)	5	Valeriy Bondar	1	0	0	1
11	MF	(Brazil)	25	Gabriel Carvalho	0	1	0	1
11	MF	(Ukraine)	24	Viktor Tsukanov	0	1	0	1
TOTALS					22	5	4	31

=== Clean sheets ===
Place	Position	Nation	Number	Name	Premier League	Ukrainian Cup	Champions League	Total
1	GK	(Ukraine)	31	Dmytro Riznyk	8	1	0	9
2	GK	(Ukraine)	23	Kiril Fesyun	0	1	0	1
TOTALS					8	2	0	10

=== Disciplinary record ===
Number	Nation	Position	Name	Premier League		Ukrainian Cup		Champions League		Total	
Number	Nation	Position	Name	Yellow card	Red card	Yellow card	Red card	Yellow card	Red card	Yellow card	Red card
2	(Burkina Faso)	FW	Lassina Traoré	2	0	0	0	0	0	2	0
5	(Ukraine)	DF	Valeriy Bondar	1	0	1	0	1	0	3	0
6	(Brazil)	MF	Marlon Gomes	1	0	1	0	3	0	5	0
8	(Ukraine)	MF	Dmytro Kryskiv	1	0	0	0	1	0	2	0
11	(Brazil)	MF	Newerton	1	0	1	0	0	0	2	0
13	(Brazil)	DF	Pedro Henrique	0	0	1	0	1	0	2	0
14	(Brazil)	MF	Isaque	2	0	0	0	1	0	3	0
17	(Brazil)	DF	Vinicius Tobias	1	1	0	0	1	0	2	1
22	(Ukraine)	DF	Mykola Matviyenko	2	0	0	0	0	0	2	0
27	(Ukraine)	MF	Oleh Ocheretko	1	0	1	0	1	0	3	0
30	(Brazil)	FW	Alisson Santana	3	0	0	0	0	0	3	0
37	(Brazil)	MF	Lucas Ferreira	1	0	0	0	0	0	1	0
49	(Brazil)	FW	Luca Meirelles	1	0	0	0	0	0	1	0
77	(Venezuela)	MF	Gleiker Mendoza	1	0	0	0	1	0	2	0
Players away on loan:
Players who left Shakhtar Donetsk during the season:
			TOTALS	18	1	5	0	10	0	33	1
