= Lucas Ferreira (Brazilian footballer) =

Brazilian footballer (born 2006)

Personal information
- Full name: Lucas dos Santos Ferreira
- Date of birth: 28 April 2006 (age 20)
- Place of birth: Campos dos Goytacazes, Brazil
- Height: 1.84 m (6 ft 0 in)
- Positions: Winger; attacking midfielder

Team information
- Current team: Shakhtar Donetsk
- Number: 37

Youth career
- 2012–2016: Americano
- 2017–2020: Flamengo
- 2021: Boavista
- 2021–2025: São Paulo

Senior career*
Years	Team	Apps	(Gls)
2025	São Paulo	16	(0)
2025–	Shakhtar Donetsk	19	(2)

International career
2023	Brazil U17		
- * Club domestic league appearances and goals as of 14 September 2026

Lucas dos Santos Ferreira (born 28 April 2006), better known as Ferreira or Lucas Ferreira, is a Brazilian professional footballer who plays as a winger or attacking midfielder for Ukrainian Premier League club Shakhtar Donetsk.

== Youth career ==
Ferreira started in the Americano children's categories at the age of six. In 2017 he arrived at Flamengo where he played for three seasons, but ended up being released. After this spell, he played for Boavista SC for a few months and in 2021, arrived at São Paulo, where he gained prominence and was scouted by European clubs like Bayer Leverkusen. Ferreira even defended the Brazil under-17 team in some matches in 2023, and in March of the same year, he signed his first professional contract. In September 2024 renewed with a termination fine of R$ 440 millions. In January 2025, Ferreira became champion of the 2025 Copa São Paulo.

== Club career ==
=== São Paulo ===
Lucas Ferreira made his professional debut against Botafogo-SP, on 20 January 2025. Ferreira played for São Paulo for 23 matches, scoring one goal in the victory against Libertad, on April 23, valid for the 2025 Copa Libertadores.

=== Shakhtar Donetsk ===
On 16 August 2025, Ferreira joined Ukrainian Premier League side Shakhtar Donetsk for a reported fee of €10 million, signing a five-year contract.

== Career statistics ==
As of match played 3 November 2026

Appearances and goals by club, season and competition
Club	Season	League			Cup		Continental		Other		Total	
Club	Season	Division	Apps	Goals	Apps	Goals	Apps	Goals	Apps	Goals	Apps	Goals
São Paulo	2025	Série A	13	0	2	0	5 (Note: Appearance(s) in Copa Libertadores)	1	3 (Note: Appearance(s) in Campeonato Paulista)	0	23	1
Shakhtar Donetsk	2025–26	Ukrainian Premier League	15	2	2	0	12 (Note: Appearance(s) in UEFA Conference League)	1	—		29	3
Shakhtar Donetsk	2026–27	Ukrainian Premier League	4	0	0	0	3 (Note: Appearances in UEFA Champions League)	0	—		7	0
Shakhtar Donetsk	Total		19	2	2	0	15	1	—		36	3
Career total			32	2	4	0	20	2	3	0	59	4

== Honours ==
São Paulo U20

- Copa São Paulo de Futebol Jr.: 2025
- Copa do Brasil Sub-20: 2024
- Dallas Cup U19: 2024
