= Luca Meirelles =

Brazilian footballer (born 2007)

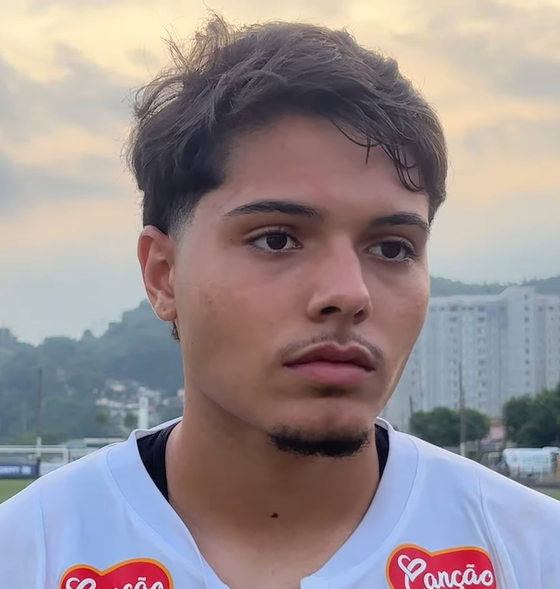
- Luca Meirelles in 2025

Personal information
- Full name: Luca Oliveira Meirelles
- Date of birth: 15 March 2007 (age 19)
- Place of birth: Goiânia, Brazil
- Height: 1.85 m (6 ft 1 in)
- Position: Forward

Team information
- Current team: Shakhtar Donetsk
- Number: 49

Youth career
- 2018–2024: Santos

Senior career*
Years	Team	Apps	(Gls)
2024–2025	Santos	16	(0)
2025–	Shakhtar Donetsk	29	(9)

International career^{‡}
2024	Brazil U17	3	(5)
2026–	Brazil U20	7	(2)
- * Club domestic league appearances and goals as of 19:12, 30 October 2026 (UTC) ‡ National team caps and goals as of 01:24, 4 October 2026 (UTC)

Luca Oliveira Meirelles (born 15 March 2007) is a Brazilian professional footballer who plays as a forward for Ukrainian Premier League club Shakhtar Donetsk.

== Club career ==
=== Santos ===
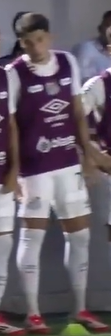
Luca Meirelles with Santos in 2025

Born in Goiânia, Goiás, Luca Meirelles joined Santos' youth setup in 2018, aged ten, after playing in a football school in his hometown. He signed his first professional contract with the club on 20 July 2023, after agreeing to a three-year deal.

On 12 November 2024, Luca Meirelles renewed his link with Peixe until December 2029, and was promoted to the main squad two days later. He made his professional debut on 17 November, coming on as a late substitute for Giuliano in a 2–0 home loss to CRB, as the club was already champions.

=== Shakhtar Donetsk ===
On 28 August 2025, Meirelles joined Ukrainian Premier League side Shakhtar Donetsk for a reported €12m fee, signing a five-year contract.

== International career ==
In June 2024, Luca Meirelles was called up to the Brazil national under-17 team. He played for the nation in the Cascais Luso Cup, scoring in all three matches of the competition, and notably netting a hat-trick in a 16–1 win over São Tomé and Príncipe.

On 22 July 2025, Luca Meirelles and Santos teammate Gabriel Bontempo were called up to the under-20 team for two friendlies against Paraguay.

== Career statistics ==
As of match played 3 November 2026.

Club	Season	League			State league (Note: Includes Campeonato Paulista)		National cup (Note: Includes Copa do Brasil, Ukrainian Cup)		Continental		Other		Total	
Club	Season	Division	Apps	Goals	Apps	Goals	Apps	Goals	Apps	Goals	Apps	Goals	Apps	Goals
Santos	2024	Série B	2	0	—		—		—		—		2	0
Santos	2025	Série A	7	0	7	0	1	0	—		—		15	0
Santos	Total		9	0	7	0	1	0	—		—		17	0
Shakhtar Donetsk	2025–26	Ukrainian Premier League	20	6	—		2	2	7 (Note: Appearances in UEFA Conference League)	3	—		29	11
Shakhtar Donetsk	2026–27	Ukrainian Premier League	9	3	—		1	0	2 (Note: Appearances in UEFA Champions League)	0	—		12	3
Shakhtar Donetsk	Total		29	9	—		3	2	9	3	—		41	14
Career total			38	9	7	0	4	2	9	3	0	0	58	14

== Honours ==
Santos

- Campeonato Paulista Sub-17: 2024
- Campeonato Brasileiro Série B: 2024

Shakhtar Donetsk

- Ukrainian Premier League: 2025–26

Brazil U17

- Cascais Luso Cup: 2024

Individual

- Campeonato Brasileiro Sub-17 top scorer: 2024
- Campeonato Brasileiro Sub-20 top scorer: 2025
