= Prosper Obah =

Nigerian footballer (born 2003)

Personal information
- Full name: Prosper Sopuruchi Obah
- Date of birth: 24 November 2003 (age 22)
- Place of birth: Umuahia, Nigeria
- Height: 1.80 m (5 ft 11 in)
- Positions: Winger; forward

Team information
- Current team: Shakhtar Donetsk
- Number: 68

Youth career
- 2019–2021: Supreme Kings
- 2022–2024: Vizela

Senior career*
| Years | Team | Apps | (Gls) |
| 2021–2022 | Supreme Kings | | |
| 2024–2025 | Vizela | 32 | (5) |
| 2025–2026 | LNZ Cherkasy | 15 | (7) |
| 2026– | Shakhtar Donetsk | 13 | (3) |
- * Club domestic league appearances and goals as of 24 October 2026

Prosper Sopuruchi Obah (born 24 November 2003) is a Nigerian professional footballer who plays as a winger or forward for Shakhtar Donetsk.

== Early life ==
Obah was born on 24 November 2003 in Umuahia, Nigeria and is a native of the city. Growing up, he attended Evangel High School in Nigeria.

== Career ==
As a youth player, Obah joined the youth academy of Nigerian side Supreme Kings FC. Following his stint there, he joined the youth academy of Portuguese side Vizela during the summer of 2022 and was promoted to the club's senior team ahead of the 2024–25 season, where he made thirty-two league appearances and scored five goals.

Three years later, he signed for Ukrainian side LNZ, where he made fifteen league appearances and scored seven goals. Subsequently, he signed for Ukrainian side Shakhtar in 2026.

== Style of play ==
Obah plays as a winger or forward. Ukrainian news website Sport.ua wrote in 2026 that he "was remembered for his incredible speed and ball handling, his pinpoint strikes".

== Career statistics ==
As of match played 24 October 2026

Appearances and goals by club, season and competition
| Club | Season | League | | | Cup | | Europe | | Other | | Total | |
| Club | Season | Division | Apps | Goals | Apps | Goals | Apps | Goals | Apps | Goals | Apps | Goals |
|---|---|---|---|---|---|---|---|---|---|---|---|---|
| Vizela | 2024–25 | Liga Portugal 2 | 32 | 5 | 1 | 1 | — | | — | | 33 | 6 |
| LNZ Cherkasy | 2025–26 | Ukrainian Premier League | 15 | 7 | 2 | 1 | — | | — | | 17 | 8 |
| Shakhtar Donetsk | 2025–26 | Ukrainian Premier League | 11 | 3 | — | | 1 (Note: Appearance in UEFA Conference League) | 0 | — | | 12 | 3 |
| Shakhtar Donetsk | 2026–27 | Ukrainian Premier League | 2 | 0 | 1 | 0 | 0 | 0 | — | | 3 | 0 |
| Shakhtar Donetsk | Total | | 13 | 3 | 1 | 0 | 1 | 0 | — | | 15 | 3 |
| Career total | | | 60 | 15 | 4 | 2 | 1 | 0 | 0 | 0 | 65 | 17 |
