= Kauã Elias =

Brazilian footballer (born 2006)

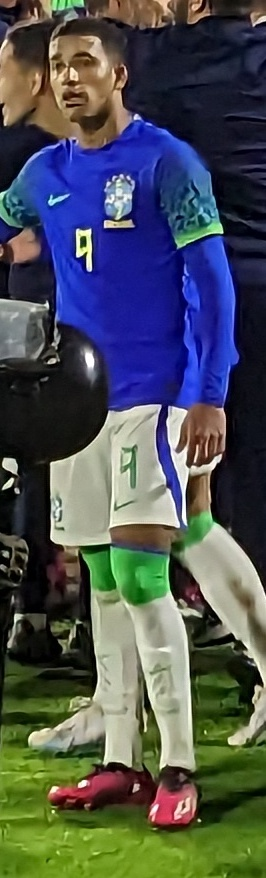
- Elias in 2023

Personal information
- Full name: Kauã Elias Nogueira
- Date of birth: 28 March 2006 (age 20)
- Place of birth: Uberlândia, Brazil
- Height: 1.81 m (5 ft 11 in)
- Position: Forward

Team information
- Current team: Shakhtar Donetsk
- Number: 9

Youth career
- 2017–2023: Fluminense

Senior career*
Years	Team	Apps	(Gls)
2023–2025	Fluminense	37	(7)
2025–	Shakhtar Donetsk	34	(9)

International career^{‡}
2023	Brazil U17	12	(9)
- * Club domestic league appearances and goals as of 9 October 2026 ‡ National team caps and goals as of 2 April 2023

Kauã Elias Nogueira (born 28 March 2006) is a Brazilian footballer who plays as a forward for Ukrainian Premier League club Shakhtar Donetsk.

== Early life ==
Elias was raised by his grandfather, José Elias, a former goalkeeper who played amateur football in the Uberlândia municipality, and his grandmother, Lucilene De Faria. His parents also had an important part of Kauã's upbringing but Kauã spent most part of his childhood with the paternal side of the family.

== Club career ==
=== Early career ===
Having played football on the fields of Uberlândia with his grandfather, Elias started his career with futsal school Praia Clube. His performances eventually led to him being noticed by a scout from professional side Fluminense in mid-2016. He was invited to trial with the club in Xerém, but his grandfather was initially reluctant to take him due to the high costs of travel. However, after hearing what he described as a "divine voice" while napping, telling him to take his grandson to the trial, the two embarked on the trip to Xerém and Elias' trial was successful.

Though he was a forward, Elias would get more assists than goals in his early career with Fluminense. His grandfather offered him R$25 (US$4.47) for every goal he scored, as in incentive to encourage him to be more clinical in front of goal, but soon had to retract his offer, as Elias would score too many goals. This bet would prove fruitful for both Elias and Fluminense, as he continued this prolific form as he progressed through the academy, finishing as top scorer at a number of international tournaments.

He signed his first professional contract with the club in June 2021, keeping him with the club until 2027, with a release clause to foreign clubs worth an estimated R$280 million (US$50.06 million). On 11 October 2023, he was named by English newspaper The Guardian as one of the best players born in 2006 worldwide.

=== Shakhtar Donetsk ===
On 8 February 2025, Elias signed a five-year contract with Ukrainian Premier League club Shakhtar Donetsk. Later that year, on 14 May, he scored his first goal for the club against Dynamo Kyiv in the Ukrainian Cup final, which ended in victory following a penalty shoot-out. On 3 August 2026, he scored his first hat-trick in a 5–1 victory over Kudrivka.

== International career ==
Elias was first called up to the Brazil under-17 team in January 2023. He was then called up again for the 2023 South American U-17 Championship, and in the first game against Ecuador, he scored two goals, though his side went on to draw the game 2–2.

== Career statistics ==
As of match played 3 November 2026

Appearances and goals by club, season and competition
Club	Season	League			State league (Note: Includes Campeonato Carioca)		National cup (Note: Includes Copa do Brasil, Ukrainian Cup)		Continental		Total	
Club	Season	Division	Apps	Goals	Apps	Goals	Apps	Goals	Apps	Goals	Apps	Goals
Fluminense	2023	Série A	0	0	0	0	0	0	1 (Note: Appearances in Copa Libertadores)	0	1	0
Fluminense	2024	Série A	30	6	4	0	3	1	6	0	43	7
Fluminense	2025	Série A	3	1	—		—		—		3	1
Fluminense	Total		33	7	4	0	3	1	7	0	47	8
Shakhtar Donetsk	2024–25	Ukrainian Premier League	9	0	—		1	1	—		10	1
Shakhtar Donetsk	2025–26	Ukrainian Premier League	18	6	—		1	0	17 (Note: Five appearances and two goals in UEFA Europa League, twelve appearances and three goals in UEFA Conference League)	5	36	11
Shakhtar Donetsk	2026–27	Ukrainian Premier League	7	3	—		0	0	4 (Note: Appearances in UEFA Champions League)	0	11	3
Shakhtar Donetsk	Total		34	9	—		2	1	21	5	57	15
Career total			67	14	4	0	5	2	28	5	104	23

== Honours ==
Fluminense

- Copa Libertadores: 2023

Shakhtar Donetsk

- Ukrainian Premier League: 2025–26
- Ukrainian Cup: 2024–25
