= Isaque Silva =

Brazilian footballer (born 2007)

Personal information
- Full name: Isaque Severino Silva
- Date of birth: 24 February 2007 (age 19)
- Place of birth: São Carlos, Interior of São Paulo, Brazil
- Height: 1.72 m (5 ft 8 in)
- Position: Attacking midfielder

Team information
- Current team: Shakhtar Donetsk
- Number: 14

Youth career
- 2018–2024: Fluminense

Senior career*
Years	Team	Apps	(Gls)
2024–2025	Fluminense	9	(0)
2025–	Shakhtar Donetsk	34	(6)

International career^{‡}
2026–	Brazil U20	6	(1)
- * Club domestic league appearances and goals as of 30 October 2026 ‡ National team caps and goals as of 3 October 2026

Isaque Severino Silva (born 24 February 2007) is a Brazilian professional footballer who plays as an attacking midfielder for Ukrainian Premier League club Shakhtar Donetsk.

== Club career ==
=== Fluminense ===
Isaque Silva played for Fluminense's youth setup since the age of ten. In May 2023, he signed his first professional contract with Fluminense until 2028. On 5 December 2024, Isaque made his professional debut for Fluminense, coming on as a substitute in a 1–0 Série A home win against Cuiabá.

=== Shakhtar Donetsk ===
On 28 August 2025, Isaque joined Ukrainian Premier League side Shakhtar Donetsk for a reported fee of €10 million, potentially rising to €12 million. He signed a five-year contract with the club.

== Career statistics ==
As of match played 3 November 2026

Appearances and goals by club, season and competition
Club	Season	League			State league (Note: Includes Campeonato Carioca)		National cup (Note: Includes Copa do Brasil, Ukrainian Cup)		Continental		Other		Total	
Club	Season	Division	Apps	Goals	Apps	Goals	Apps	Goals	Apps	Goals	Apps	Goals	Apps	Goals
Fluminense	2024	Série A	1	0	0	0	0	0	0	0	0	0	1	0
Fluminense	2025	Série A	1	0	7	0	1	0	2 (Note: Appearances in Copa Sudamericana)	0	0	0	11	0
Fluminense	Total		2	0	7	0	1	0	2	0	0	0	12	0
Shakhtar Donetsk	2025–26	Ukrainian Premier League	24	5	—		2	0	12 (Note: Appearances in UEFA Conference League)	2	—		38	7
Shakhtar Donetsk	2026–27	Ukrainian Premier League	10	1	—		1	1	4 (Note: Appearances in UEFA Champions League)	0	—		15	2
Shakhtar Donetsk	Total		34	6	—		3	1	16	2	—		53	9
Career total			36	6	7	0	4	1	18	2	0	0	65	9
