= Pedrinho (footballer, born April 1998) =

Brazilian footballer

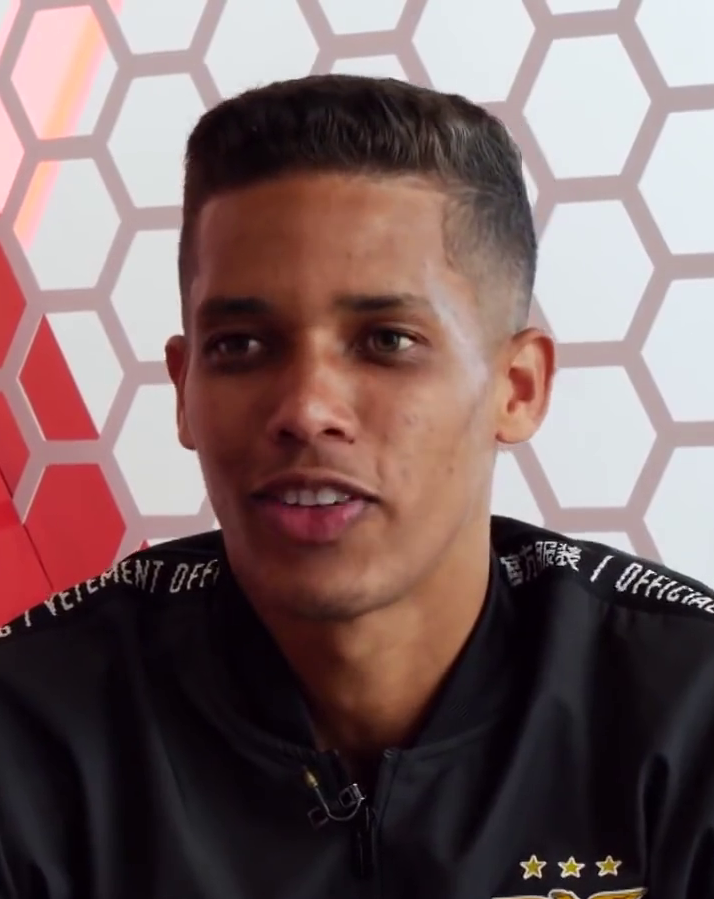
- Pedrinho with Benfica in 2020

Personal information
- Full name: Pedro Victor Delmino da Silva
- Date of birth: 13 April 1998 (age 28)
- Place of birth: Maceió, Alagoas, Brazil
- Height: 1.72 m (5 ft 8 in)
- Position: Attacking midfielder

Team information
- Current team: Shakhtar Donetsk
- Number: 10

Youth career
- 2005–2010: CSA
- 2011–2013: Vitória
- 2013–2019: Corinthians

Senior career*
Years	Team	Apps	(Gls)
2017–2020	Corinthians	108	(6)
2020–2021	Benfica	19	(0)
2021–	Shakhtar Donetsk	63	(12)
2022–2024	→ Atlético Mineiro (loan)	45	(0)

International career^{‡}
2019–2020	Brazil U23	15	(3)
- * Club domestic league appearances and goals as of 17 October 2026 ‡ National team caps and goals as of 2 July 2021

Pedro Victor Delmino da Silva (born 13 April 1998), known as Pedrinho, is a Brazilian professional footballer who plays as an attacking midfielder for Ukrainian Premier League club Shakhtar Donetsk.

== Club career ==
=== Early career ===
Pedrinho joined Corinthians in 2013, after a brief stint at Vitória. He was part of the 2016 Copa São Paulo de Futebol Júnior and 2016 U20 Campeonato Brasileiro squads that ended up as runner up in both tournaments. The following year, he was chosen as the best player of the 2017 Copa São Paulo de Futebol Júnior, in which Corinthians won its tenth title.

=== Corinthians ===
Pedrinho made his official debut as a substitute during the second half of a 1–0 defeat against Ferroviária on 19 March 2017.

=== Benfica ===
On 11 March 2020, S.L. Benfica reported that they had signed Pedrinho for €20 million, on a contract until 2025. The player would remain with Corinthians until the opening of the Portuguese transfer market.

=== Shakhtar Donetsk ===
On 9 June 2021, Benfica announced he was sold for 18 million euros to the Ukrainian Premier League side Shakhtar Donetsk. On 13 June 2021, Pedrinho signed a five year contract with the Ukrainian club.

==== Loan to Atlético Mineiro ====
On 30 June 2022, Atlético Mineiro announced an agreement with Shakhtar for the signing of Pedrinho on a one-year loan, which was eventually extended for an additional year until June 2024.

== International career ==
Pedrinho has expressed interest in playing for the Ukraine national team.

== Career statistics ==
As of match played 21 October 2026.

Club statistics
Club	Season	League			State League		Cup		Continental		Other		Total	
Club	Season	Division	Apps	Goals	Apps	Goals	Apps	Goals	Apps	Goals	Apps	Goals	Apps	Goals
Corinthians	2017	Série A	12	0	6 (Note: Appearance(s) in Campeonato Paulista)	0	0	0	2 (Note: Appearance(s) in Copa Sudamericana)	1	—		20	1
Corinthians	2018	Série A	35	0	7	1	5	1	6 (Note: Appearance(s) in Copa Libertadores)	0	—		53	2
Corinthians	2019	Série A	28	5	17	0	4	0	8	2	—		57	7
Corinthians	2020	Série A	—		3	0	—		1	0	—		4	0
Corinthians	Total		75	5	33	1	9	1	17	3	—		134	10
Benfica	2020–21	Primeira Liga	19	0	—		4	1	5 (Note: One appearance in UEFA Champions League, four appearances in UEFA Europa League)	0	3 (Note: One appearance in Supertaça Cândido de Oliveira, two appearances in Taça da Liga)	0	31	1
Shakhtar Donetsk	2021–22	Ukrainian Premier League	11	3	—		0	0	7 (Note: Appearance(s) in UEFA Champions League)	1	1 (Note: Appearance in Ukrainian Super Cup)	0	19	4
Shakhtar Donetsk	2024–25	Ukrainian Premier League	25	1	—		4	0	4	0	—		33	1
Shakhtar Donetsk	2025–26	Ukrainian Premier League	22	6	—		1	0	15 (Note: Five appearances and one goal in UEFA Europa League, ten appearances and one goal in UEFA Conference League)	1	—		38	7
Shakhtar Donetsk	2026–27	Ukrainian Premier League	5	2	—		0	0	2	1	—		7	3
Shakhtar Donetsk	Total		63	12	—		5	0	28	3	1	0	97	16
Atlético Mineiro (loan)	2022	Série A	7	0	—		—		1	0	—		8	0
Atlético Mineiro (loan)	2023	Série A	15	0	11 (Note: Appearance(s) in Campeonato Mineiro)	0	1	0	7	0	—		34	0
Atlético Mineiro (loan)	2024	Série A	8	0	4	0	1	0	3	2	—		16	2
Atlético Mineiro (loan)	Total		30	0	15	0	2	0	11	2	—		58	2
Career total			188	16	48	1	20	2	61	8	4	0	320	27

== Honours ==
Corinthians

- Campeonato Brasileiro Série A: 2017
- Campeonato Paulista: 2017, 2018, 2019

Shakhtar Donetsk

- Ukrainian Super Cup: 2021

Atlético Mineiro

- Campeonato Mineiro: 2023, 2024

Brazil U23

- Toulon Tournament: 2019
