= Newerton =

Brazilian footballer

Personal information
- Full name: Newerton Martins da Silva
- Date of birth: 3 June 2005 (age 21)
- Place of birth: Palmares, Brazil
- Height: 1.65 m (5 ft 5 in)
- Position: Left winger

Team information
- Current team: Shakhtar Donetsk
- Number: 11

Youth career
- 2018–2019: Sport Recife
- 2021–2023: São Paulo

Senior career*
Years	Team	Apps	(Gls)
2023–	Shakhtar Donetsk	65	(12)
- * Club domestic league appearances and goals as of 30 October 2026

Newerton Martins da Silva (born 3 June 2005), known simply as Newerton, is a Brazilian professional footballer who plays as a left winger for Ukrainian Premier League club Shakhtar Donetsk.

== Club career ==
=== Shakhtar Donetsk ===
On 21 July 2023 he signed a five-year contract with the Ukrainian Premier League giant Shakhtar Donetsk.

== Career statistics ==
As of match played 3 November 2026

Appearances and goals by club, season and competition
Club	Season	League			Cup		Continental		Other		Total	
Club	Season	Division	Apps	Goals	Apps	Goals	Apps	Goals	Apps	Goals	Apps	Goals
São Paulo	2023	Série A	0	0	0	0	0	0	0	0	0	0
Shakhtar Donetsk	2023–24	Ukrainian Premier League	15	1	1	0	5 (Note: Four appearances in UEFA Champions League, one appearance in UEFA Europa League)	0	—		21	1
Shakhtar Donetsk	2024–25	Ukrainian Premier League	17	4	1	0	4 (Note: Appearances in UEFA Champions League)	0	—		22	4
Shakhtar Donetsk	2025–26	Ukrainian Premier League	23	5	1	0	16 (Note: Six appearances and one goal in UEFA Europa League, ten appearances and one goal in UEFA Conference League)	2	—		40	7
Shakhtar Donetsk	2026–27	Ukrainian Premier League	10	2	1	0	4	0	—		15	2
Shakhtar Donetsk	Total		65	12	4	0	29	2	—		98	14
Career total			65	12	4	0	29	2	0	0	98	14

== Honours ==
Shakhtar Donetsk

- Ukrainian Cup: 2024–25
