= Mark Assinor =

Ghanaian footballer

Personal information
- Full name: Mark Assinor Osei
- Date of birth: 13 July 2000 (age 26)
- Place of birth: Accra, Ghana
- Height: 1.83 m (6 ft 0 in)
- Position: Forward

Team information
- Current team: LNZ Cherkasy
- Number: 90

Senior career*
Years	Team	Apps	(Gls)
- Charity Stars
2019–2020	Zalesianka Zalesie	12	(5)
2020–2022	Sokół Kocmyrzów	48	(31)
2022–2023	Hutnik Kraków	14	(3)
2023	→ Garbarnia Kraków (loan)	13	(6)
2023–2024	Podbrezová	28	(6)
2024–	LNZ Cherkasy	31	(9)
- * Club domestic league appearances and goals as of 3 June 2026

Mark Assinor Osei (born 13 July 2000) is a Ghanaian professional footballer who plays for Ukrainian Premier League club LNZ Cherkasy as a forward.

== Club career ==
=== Železiarne Podbrezová ===
Assinor made his Slovak Super Liga debut for Podbrezová against Spartak Trnava on 20 August 2023.
