= Predoslje =

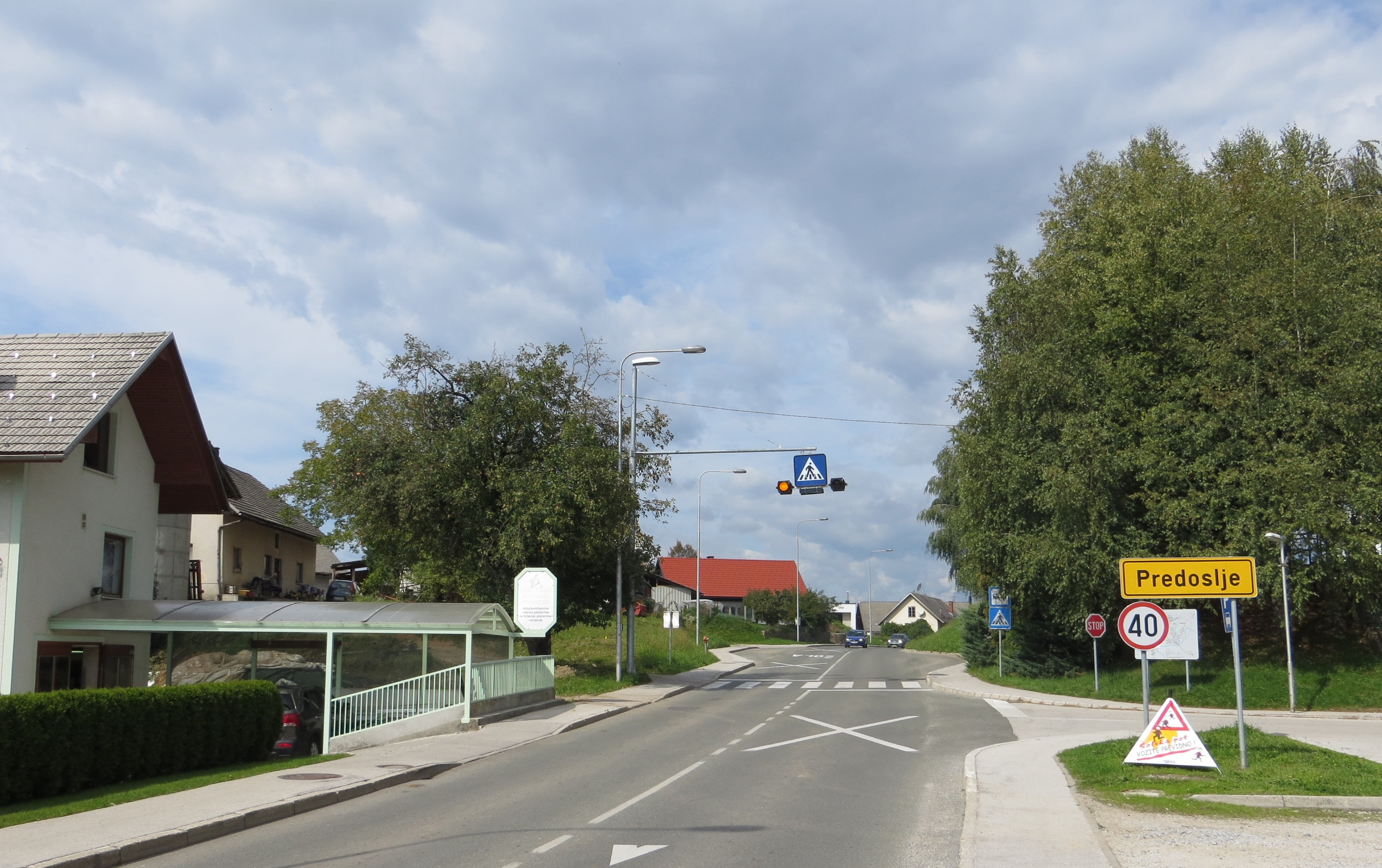

- Location in Slovenia
- Coordinates: 46°15′40.81″N 14°22′55.73″E
- Country: Slovenia
- Traditional region: Upper Carniola
- Statistical region: Upper Carniola
- Municipality: Kranj

Area
  - Total: 4.04 km^{2} (1.56 sq mi)
- Elevation: 407.4 m (1,337 ft)

Population (2002)
  - Total: 966

Predoslje (pronounced [ˈpɾeːdɔsljɛ]; German: Predassel) is a village in the Municipality of Kranj in the Upper Carniola region of Slovenia. The territory of the village includes Brdo Castle.

== Name ==
Predoslje was attested in written sources in 1304 as Prerazel (and as Prerazzel in 1308, Prerassel in 1437, and Predoſlau in 1689, among other names). The name may originate from the form *Prěrosľane 'people living by a natural bridge or passage' (< *prěrǫslo 'passage'), referring to a natural geographical feature, or from the hypocorism *Prědoslъ, referring to an early inhabitant of the place.

== Church ==
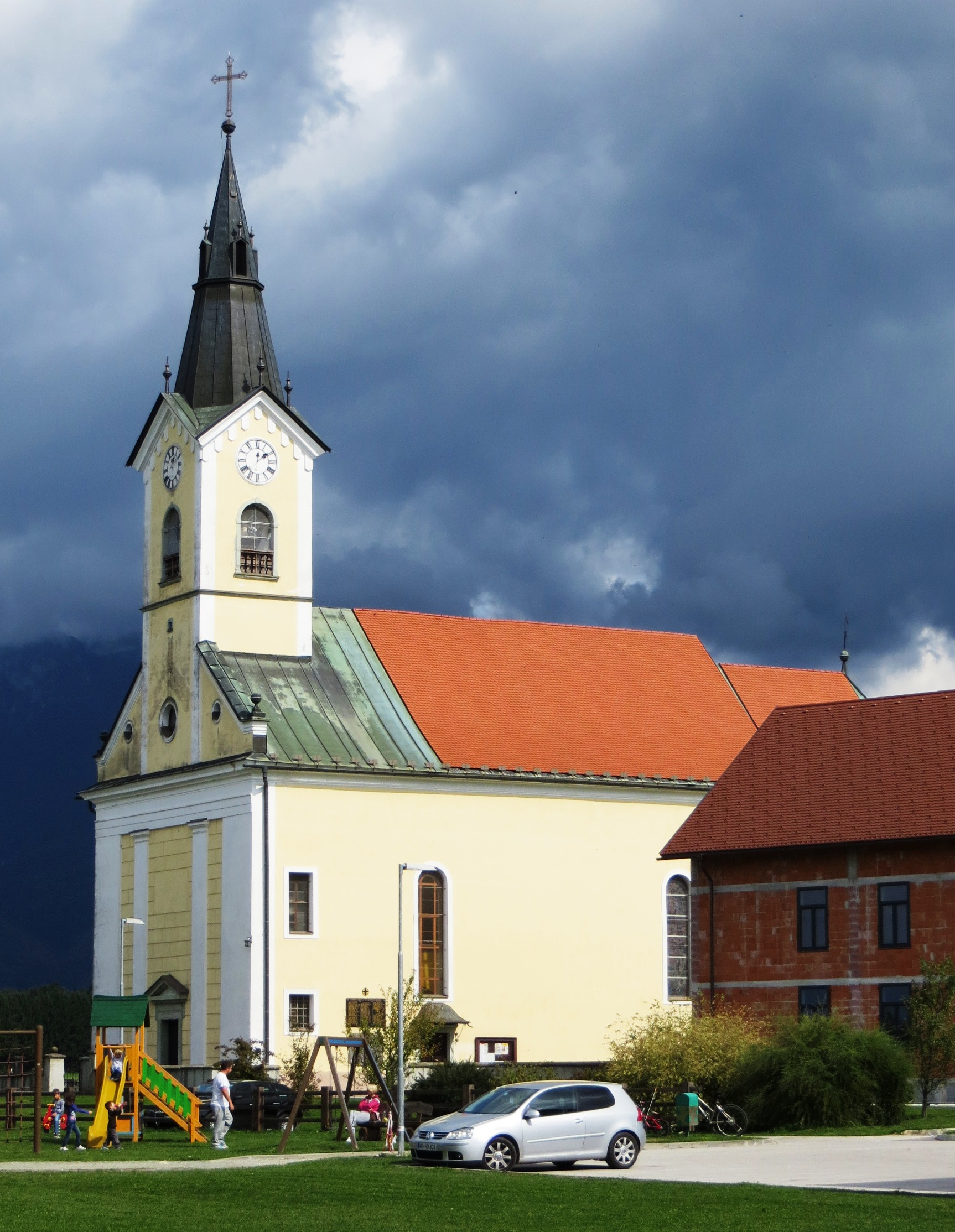
St. Sixtus's Church

The parish church in the settlement is dedicated to Saint Sixtus. It dates from 1882 and its architecture includes Baroque and pseudo-Romantic features. The altar painting is by Ivan Franke (1841–1927), the painting of the Virgin Mary is by Janez Wolf (1825–1884), and the wall paintings are by Matija Bradaška (1852–1915).

== Notable people ==
Notable people that were born or lived in Predoslje include:

- Cene Malovrh (1915–2000), geographer and hiking specialist
- Matevž Ravnikar (a.k.a. Poženčan) (1802–1864), poet and collector of ethnographic material

== Gallery ==
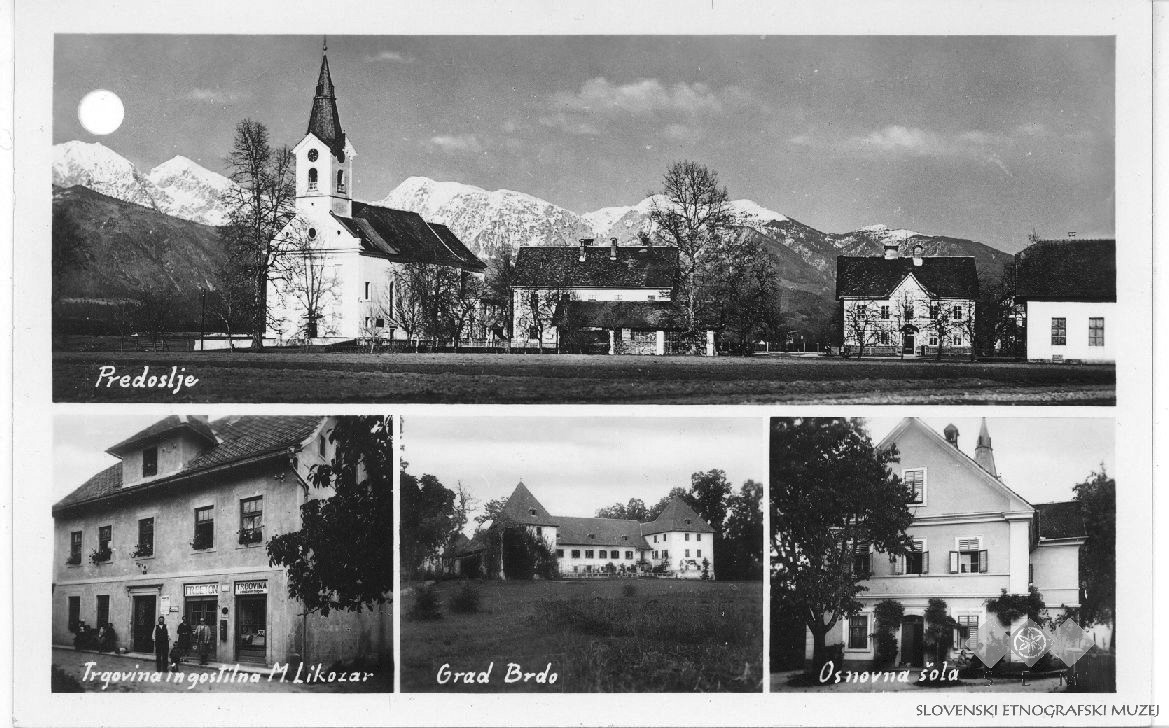
Historical postcard of Predoslje
