= Vinicius Tobias =

Brazilian footballer (born 2004)

Vinícius Tobías
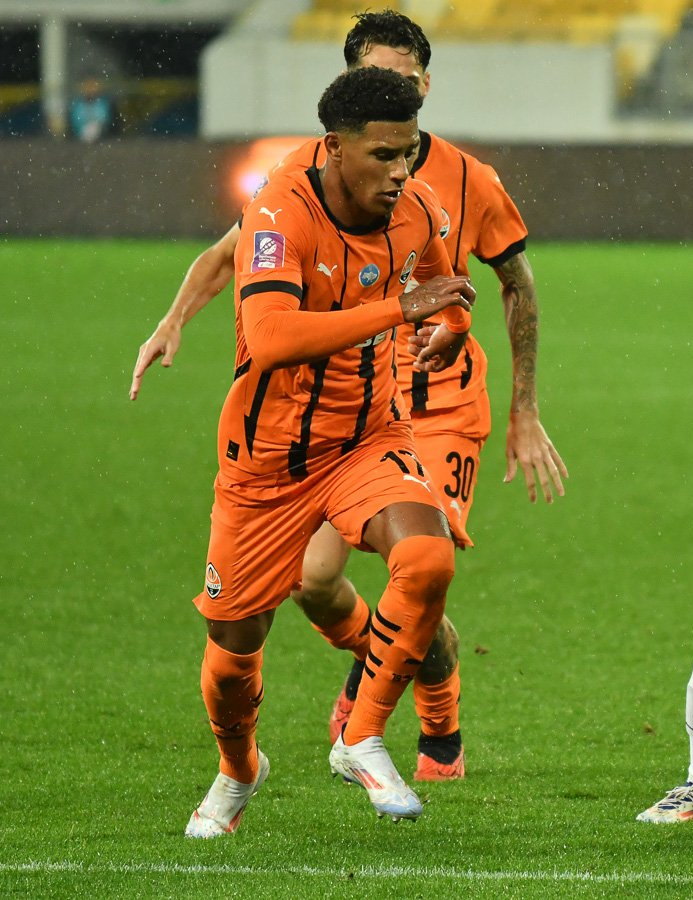

Personal information
- Full name: Vinícius Augusto Tobías da Silva
- Date of birth: 23 February 2004 (age 22)
- Place of birth: São Paulo, Brazil
- Height: 1.77 m (5 ft 10 in)
- Position: Right-back

Team information
- Current team: Shakhtar Donetsk
- Number: 17

Youth career
- 2016–2021: Internacional

Senior career*
Years	Team	Apps	(Gls)
2022–	Shakhtar Donetsk	46	(3)
2022–2024	→ Real Madrid B (loan)	60	(0)
2024	→ Real Madrid (loan)	0	(0)

International career^{‡}
2019	Brazil U15	7	(1)
2019	Brazil U16	6	(1)
2021	Brazil U17	2	(0)
2022	Brazil U20	3	(0)
2023–	Brazil U23	1	(0)
- * Club domestic league appearances and goals as of 30 October 2026 ‡ National team caps and goals as of 7 September 2023

Vinícius Augusto Tobías da Silva (born 23 February 2004), known as Vinícius Tobías, is a Brazilian professional footballer who plays as a right-back for Ukrainian Premier League club Shakhtar Donetsk.

== Club career ==
=== Internacional ===
Born in São Paulo, Vinícius Tobías started his career with Internacional, joining in 2016. After impressive performances for Internacional’s youth teams, he was included in The Guardian's "Next Generation" list for 2021, highlighting the best young footballers worldwide.

=== Shakhtar Donetsk ===
In July 2021, it was announced that Vinícius Tobías would join Ukrainian side Shakhtar Donetsk in February of the following year. He left Internacional after six years playing for them. However, after the 2022 Russian invasion of Ukraine, which occurred just after Vinicius Tobias had moved to his new club, foreign footballers in Ukraine were allowed to leave their clubs on a loan basis.

==== Loan to Real Madrid Castilla ====
On 1 April 2022, he joined La Liga club Real Madrid on loan until the end of the 2022–23 season. As Real Madrid had already utilized all available non-EU slots for the first team squad, Tobias was assigned to the Castilla team.

On 17 April 2022, Tobias made his debut for Castilla in a 2–1 loss against Alcoyano, coming on as a substitute for Peter.

On 6 January 2024, Tobias made his debut for Real Madrid in 3–1 victory against Arandina in a Copa del Rey match.

==== Return to Shakhtar Donetsk ====
On 27 June 2024, Shakhtar Donetsk announced the return of Tobias after two seasons with Real Madrid Castilla. On 17 July 2024, Shakhtar announced that they had signed a new contract with Tobias, keeping the defender at the club until 30 June 2029.

== Career statistics ==
=== Club ===
As of match played 3 November 2026

Appearances and goals by club, season and competition
Club	Season	League			Cup		Continental		Other		Total	
Club	Season	Division	Apps	Goals	Apps	Goals	Apps	Goals	Apps	Goals	Apps	Goals
Shakhtar Donetsk	2021–22	Ukrainian Premier League	0	0	0	0	0	0	0	0	0	0
Shakhtar Donetsk	2024–25	Ukrainian Premier League	19	0	4	0	3 (Note: Appearances in UEFA Champions League)	0	0	0	26	0
Shakhtar Donetsk	2025–26	Ukrainian Premier League	19	2	1	0	20 (Note: Six appearances in UEFA Europa League, fourteen appearances in UEFA Conference League)	0	0	0	40	2
Shakhtar Donetsk	2026–27	Ukrainian Premier League	8	1	2	0	4	1	—		14	2
Shakhtar Donetsk	Total		46	3	7	0	27	1	0	0	80	4
Real Madrid Castilla (loan)	2021–22	Primera Federación	4	0	—		—		—		4	0
Real Madrid Castilla (loan)	2022–23	Primera Federación	35	0	—		—		1 (Note: Appearance in 2023 Primera Federación play-offs)	0	36	0
Real Madrid Castilla (loan)	2023–24	Primera Federación	21	0	—		—		—		21	0
Real Madrid Castilla (loan)	Total		60	0	0	0	0	0	1	0	61	0
Real Madrid (loan)	2023–24	La Liga	0	0	1	0	0	0	0	0	1	0
Career total			106	3	7	0	27	1	1	0	140	4

== Honours ==
Real Madrid

- Supercopa de España: 2024
- UEFA Champions League: 2023–24

Shakhtar Donetsk

- Ukrainian Cup: 2024–25
