= Eguinaldo =

Brazilian footballer (born 2004)

Personal information
- Full name: Eguinaldo de Sousa Lemos
- Date of birth: 9 August 2004 (age 22)
- Place of birth: Monção, Maranhão, Brazil
- Height: 1.72 m (5 ft 8 in)
- Position: Forward

Team information
- Current team: Shakhtar Donetsk
- Number: 7

Youth career
- 2021: Artsul-RJ
- 2021: → Vasco da Gama (loan)

Senior career*
Years	Team	Apps	(Gls)
2021–2022	Artsul-RJ	3	(0)
2022	→ Vasco da Gama (loan)	4	(1)
2022–2023	Vasco da Gama	23	(2)
2023–	Shakhtar Donetsk	55	(14)

International career
2022–2023	Brazil U20	5	(1)
- * Club domestic league appearances and goals as of 17 May 2026

Eguinaldo de Sousa Lemos (born 9 August 2004) is a Brazilian footballer who plays as a forward for Shakhtar Donetsk.

== Club career ==
Born in Monção, Maranhão, Eguinaldo played football on the floodplains of his hometown, playing in local competitions. He started his career with Artsul, joining in 2021, and rapidly progressing to the first team, where he featured in the Campeonato Carioca Série A2.

Having spent time on loan at Vasco da Gama, playing for their youth and senior sides, the deal was made permanent on 4 August 2022, with Eguinaldo signing a contract through 2027.

== International career ==
Eguinaldo was called up to the Brazil national under-20 football team in September 2022.

== Style of play ==
Eguinaldo is one of the fastest players in world football, clocking a top speed of 37.5 km/h in a Série B game against Novorizontino in October 2022.

== Career statistics ==
=== Club ===
As of match played 17 May 2026

Club	Season	League			State League		Cup		Continental		Other		Total	
Club	Season	Division	Apps	Goals	Apps	Goals	Apps	Goals	Apps	Goals	Apps	Goals	Apps	Goals
Artsul-RJ	2021	–			3 (Note: Appearances in the Campeonato Carioca Série A2)	0	0	0	—		4 (Note: Appearances in the Copa Rio)	1	7	1
Artsul-RJ	2022	–			0	0	0	0	—		0	0	0	0
Artsul-RJ	Total		0	0	3	0	0	0	0	0	4	1	7	1
Vasco da Gama (loan)	2022	Série B	4	1	0	0	0	0	—		0	0	4	1
Vasco da Gama	2022	Série B	18	3	0	0	0	0	—		0	0	18	3
Vasco da Gama	2023	Série A	4	0	7	0	1	0	—		—		12	0
Vasco da Gama	Total		26	4	7	0	1	0	0	0	0	0	34	4
Shakhtar Donetsk	2023–24	Ukrainian Premier League	14	2	—		2	0	5 (Note: Three appearances and one goal in UEFA Champions League, two appearances and one goal in UEFA Europa League)	2	—		21	4
Shakhtar Donetsk	2024–25	Ukrainian Premier League	26	6	—		3	0	7 (Note: Appearances in UEFA Champions League)	0	—		36	6
Shakhtar Donetsk	2025–26	Ukrainian Premier League	15	7	—		1	0	11 (Note: Three appearances in UEFA Europa League, eight appearances in UEFA Conference League)	2	—		27	8
Shakhtar Donetsk	Total		55	14	—		6	0	23	4	—		82	18
Career total			81	18	10	0	7	0	23	4	4	1	125	23

== Honours ==
Shakhtar Donetsk

- Ukrainian Cup: 2024–25

Individual

- Ukrainian Premier League Player of the Round: 2025–26 (Round 11)
