= List of Ukrainian football transfers winter 2022–23 =

This is a list of Ukrainian football transfers winter 2022–23.

== Ukrainian Premier League ==
=== Chornomorets Odesa ===
In:

No.	Pos.	Nation	Player
—	DF	SLO	Luka Guček (from (Slovenia) Radomlje)
—	MF	BRA	Wanderson Maranhão (loan return from (Lithuania) Panevėžys)
—	MF	UKR	Yevhen Zadoya (from Kolos Kovalivka)
—	MF	ISR	Guy Hadida (from (Turkey) Sakaryaspor)
—	MF	UKR	Oleksandr Vasylyev (from Lviv)
—	MF	UKR	Oleksandr Demchenko (from Oleksandriya)
—	MF	UKR	Dmytro Romanov (Loan return from Real Pharma Odesa)
—	MF	UKR	Artur Avahimyan (on loan from Oleksandriya)
—	FW	UKR	Danyil Alefirenko (from Zorya Luhansk)

Out:

No.	Pos.	Nation	Player
—	DF	UKR	Serhiy Petko (to Mynai)
—	DF	UKR	Serhiy Sukhanov (to Obolon Kyiv)
—	MF	UKR	Ivan Lytvynenko (to (Georgia (country)) Dinamo Batumi)
—	MF	UKR	Serhiy Kravchenko (End of Career)
—	MF	UKR	Ivan Bobko (to Karpaty Lviv)
—	MF	CAN	Manjrekar James (Released)
—	MF	UKR	Vladyslav Naumets (to Metalist Kharkiv)
—	MF	UKR	Maksym Yermolenko (to Obolon Kyiv)
—	FW	ALB	Realdo Fili (Released)
—	FW	CGO	Kévin Koubemba (to (Romania) Argeș)

=== Dnipro-1 ===
In:

No.	Pos.	Nation	Player
—	DF	BRA	Hayner (on loan from (Brazil) Azuriz)
—	DF	UKR	Vitaliy Fedoriv (from Metalist Kharkiv)
—	MF	BRA	João Peglow (loan from (Brazil) Internacional)
—	MF	BRA	Bill (loan return from (Latvia) RFS)
—	MF	ARG	Francisco Di Franco (loan return from (Argentina) Atlético Tucumán)
—	MF	UKR	Yevhen Pasich (from Veres Rivne)
—	MF	CRC	Rónald Matarrita (from (United States) FC Cincinnati)
—	MF	UKR	Yevhen Pidlepenets (from Metalist Kharkiv)
—	MF	UKR	Vyacheslav Tankovskyi (from Metalist Kharkiv)
—	MF	UKR	Oleksandr Kapliyenko (on loan from Metalist Kharkiv)
—	FW	ESP	Marc Gual (loan return from (Poland) Jagiellonia Białystok)
—	FW	UKR	Maksym Solovyov (loan return from Prykarpattia)

Out:

No.	Pos.	Nation	Player
—	GK	UKR	Valeriy Yurchuk (to Lviv)
—	DF	BRA	Gabriel Busanello (loan return to (Brazil) Chapecoense)
—	MF	UKR	Artem Hromov (to (Cyprus) AEK Larnaca)
—	MF	UKR	Serhiy Lohinov (to Oleksandriya)
—	MF	BRA	Bill (loan to (Brazil) Inter de Limeira)
—	MF	UKR	Serhiy Horbunov (to Karpaty Lviv)
—	FW	ESP	Marc Gual (Free Agent)

=== Dynamo Kyiv ===
In:

No.	Pos.	Nation	Player
—	DF	UKR	Denys Kuzyk (loan return from Kolos Kovalivka)
—	DF	UKR	Maksym Dyachuk (loan return from Oleksandriya)
—	MF	DEN	Mikkel Duelund (loan return from (Denmark) NEC)
—	MF	UKR	Bohdan Lyednyev (loan return from (Hungary) Fehérvár)
—	MF	UKR	Vadym Mashchenko (loan return from (Lithuania) Jonava)
—	MF	UKR	Mykola Mykhaylenko (loan return from Zorya Luhansk)
—	MF	UKR	Akhmed Alibekov (loan return from Zorya Luhansk)
—	FW	UKR	Yevhen Isayenko (loan return from Kolos Kovalivka)
—	FW	BEL	Ibrahim Kargbo (loan return from (Cyprus) Doxa Katokopias)
—	FW	VEN	Eric Ramírez (loan return from (Slovenia) Slovan Bratislava)

Out:

No.	Pos.	Nation	Player
—	GK	UKR	Vladyslav Kucheruk (to Zorya Luhansk)
—	DF	UKR	Denys Kuzyk (loan to Lviv)
—	DF	UKR	Illya Zabarnyi (to (England) Bournemouth)
—	MF	DEN	Mikkel Duelund (loan return to (Denmark) AGF)
—	MF	UKR	Mykola Mykhaylenko (loan to Oleksandriya)
—	MF	UKR	Viktor Tsyhankov (to (Spain) Girona)
—	MF	UKR	Akhmed Alibekov (to Lviv)
—	MF	POL	Tomasz Kędziora (on loan to (Greece) PAOK)
—	MF	UKR	Mykyta Kravchenko (loan to Kolos Kovalivka)
—	MF	UKR	Mykyta Burda (on loan to Zorya Luhansk)
—	FW	UKR	Vladyslav Kulach (to (Azerbaijan) Zira)
—	FW	BEL	Ibrahim Kargbo (to (Slovenia) Celje)
—	FW	UKR	Artem Besedin (On loan to (Cyprus) Omonia)

=== Inhulets Petrove ===
In:

No.	Pos.	Nation	Player
—	GK	UKR	Oleh Bilyk (from Oleksandriya)
—	MF	TUN	Mohamed Ali Ben Salem (loan return from (Tunisia) Chebba)
—	MF	UKR	Oleg Osypenko (from (Czech Republic) Králův Dvůr)
—	MF	UKR	Maksym Melnychuk (from Vorskla Poltava)
—	FW	UKR	Yuriy Kozyrenko (from Vorskla Poltava)
—	FW	UKR	Vladyslav Voytsekhovskyi (from LNZ Cherkasy)

Out:

No.	Pos.	Nation	Player
—	GK	UKR	Danylo Kucher (to (Romania) UTA Arad)
—	MF	UKR	Andriy Bliznichenko (to Veres Rivne)
—	MF	UKR	Taras Sakiv (to Karpaty Lviv)

=== Kolos Kovalivka ===
In:

No.	Pos.	Nation	Player
—	GK	UKR	Yevhen Kucherenko (loan return from (Kazakhstan) Aksu)
—	DF	UKR	Oleksandr Litvinov (loan return from Dinaz Vyshhorod)
—	DF	UKR	Oleksiy Malaki (loan return from Hirnyk-Sport Horishni Plavni)
—	MF	CMR	Alvaro Ngamba (loan return from (Finland) Mariehamn)
—	MF	BRA	Diego Carioca (loan return from (Hungary) Zalaegerszeg)
—	MF	UKR	Mykyta Kravchenko (loan from Dynamo Kyiv)
—	FW	BRA	Renan Oliveira (loan return from (Lithuania) Žalgiris)

Out:

No.	Pos.	Nation	Player
—	DF	UKR	Denys Kuzyk (loan return to Dynamo Kyiv)
—	MF	UKR	Yevhen Zadoya (to Chornomorets Odesa)
—	MF	BRA	Diego Carioca (on loan to (Azerbaijan) Sumgayit FK)
—	MF	UKR	Andriy Solovyov (on loan to Dinaz Vyshhorod)
—	FW	UKR	Yevhen Isayenko (loan return to Dynamo Kyiv)
—	FW	BRA	Renan Oliveira (to (Bosnia and Herzegovina) Sarajevo)
—	FW	GEO	Nika Sichinava (to (Kyrgyzstan) Alay)

=== Kryvbas Kryvyi Rih ===
In:

No.	Pos.	Nation	Player
—	MF	UKR	Maksym Lunyov (from Zorya Luhansk)
—	MF	UKR	Klim Prykhodko (from Shakhtar Donetsk)
—	MF	UKR	Danylo Beskorovaynyi (from (Slovakia) DAC Dunajská Streda)
—	FW	CIV	Jean Morel Poé (on loan from (Egypt) Ismaily)

Out:

No.	Pos.	Nation	Player
—	DF	CRO	Dragan Lovrić (to Ararat-Armenia)
—	DF	UKR	Ivan Zotko (to (Armenia) Urartu)
—	FW	UKR	Oleksiy Khoblenko (On Loan to Karpaty Lviv)

=== Lviv ===
In:

No.	Pos.	Nation	Player
—	GK	UKR	Oleksandr Rybka (from Metalist Kharkiv)
—	GK	UKR	Valeriy Yurchuk (from SC Dnipro-1)
—	DF	UKR	Denys Kuzyk (on loan from Dynamo Kyiv)
—	DF	UKR	Serhiy Siminin (from Karpaty Lviv)
—	DF	UKR	Oleksandr Byelyayev (On loan from (Turkey) Gençlerbirliği)
—	DF	BRA	Higor Gabriel (on loan from (Azerbaijan) Sabah)
—	MF	BRA	Alvaro (loan return from (Georgia (country)) Dila Gori)
—	MF	BRA	China (loan return from (Kazakhstan) Aktobe)
—	MF	UKR	Oleksiy Dytyatyev (from (Kazakhstan) Aksu)
—	MF	UKR	Akhmed Alibekov (from Dynamo Kyiv)
—	MF	BRA	Léo Antônio (from (Lithuania) Džiugas Telšiai)
—	MF	CRO	Ivijan Svrzhniak (from (Slovenia) Fužinar)
—	MF	BRA	Murilo Souza (from (Bahrain) Budaiya Club)
—	MF	BFA	Oula Abass Traoré (from (Guinea) Horoya AC)
—	FW	BRA	Pernambuco (loan return from (Moldova) Sheriff Tiraspol)
—	FW	UKR	Aderinsola Eseola (from (Bulgaria) Hebar Pazardzhik)
—	FW	UKR	Yaroslav Bohunov (from Dinaz Vyshhorod)

Out:

No.	Pos.	Nation	Player
—	GK	UKR	Oleksandr Ilyushchenkov (to Karpaty Lviv)
—	GK	UKR	Ivan Ponomarenko (to Vorskla Poltava)
—	DF	UKR	Pavlo Polehenko (to Zorya Luhansk)
—	MF	UKR	Mykhaylo Shyshka (to Mynai)
—	MF	UKR	Bohdan Myshenko
—	MF	UKR	Andriy Yakymiv
—	MF	UKR	Vitaliy Boyko (to LNZ Cherkasy)
—	MF	UKR	Borys Krushynskyi (to Polissya Zhytomyr)
—	MF	BRA	China (to (United Arab Emirates) Dibba)
—	MF	UKR	Dmytro Semeniv (to (Bulgaria) Pirin Blagoevgrad)
—	MF	UKR	Dmytro Semeniv (Released)
—	MF	UKR	Andriy Busko (Released)
—	MF	UKR	Oleksandr Vasylyev (to Chornomorets Odesa)
—	MF	UKR	Nazariy Muravskyi (on loan to LNZ Cherkasy)
—	FW	BRA	Pernambuco (Released)
—	FW	UKR	Nazariy Nych (to LNZ Cherkasy)

=== Metalist Kharkiv ===
In:

No.	Pos.	Nation	Player
—	GK	UKR	Oleksandr Rybka (loan return from (Turkey) Boluspor)
—	GK	UKR	Daniil Yermolov (from Kremin Kremenchuk)
—	DF	BRA	Maílton (loan return from (Brazil) Chapecoense)
—	MF	UKR	Vladyslav Naumets (from Chornomorets Odesa)
—	MF	UKR	Bohdan Boychuk (from Rukh Lviv)
—	MF	FRA	Pathy Malumandsoko (from (Greece) Apollon Pontus)
—	FW	BRA	Paulinho Bóia (loan return from (Japan) Kyoto Sanga)

Out:

No.	Pos.	Nation	Player
—	GK	UKR	Oleksandr Rybka (to Lviv)
—	DF	BRA	Maílton (loan to (Brazil) Ponte Preta)
—	DF	SEN	Boubacar Traorè (to (Bulgaria) Beroe)
—	DF	UKR	Vitaliy Fedoriv (to Dnipro-1)
—	MF	UKR	Danylo Knysh (On Loan to Karpaty Lviv)
—	MF	UKR	Yevhen Pidlepenets (to Dnipro-1)
—	MF	UKR	Vyacheslav Tankovskyi (to Dnipro-1)
—	MF	UKR	Oleksandr Kapliyenko (on loan to Dnipro-1)
—	FW	COL	Brayan Riascos (loan to (Portugal) Marítimo)

=== Metalist 1925 Kharkiv ===
In:

No.	Pos.	Nation	Player
—	GK	UKR	Maksym Kovalenko (loan return from Hirnyk-Sport Horishni Plavni)
—	MF	BRA	Fabinho (loan return from (Brazil) Ponte Preta)
—	MF	UZB	Abdulla Abdullaev (from Zorya Luhansk)
—	MF	UKR	Ihor Chaykovskyi (from Bukovyna Chernivtsi)

Out:

No.	Pos.	Nation	Player
—	GK	UKR	Maksym Kovalenko (loan to Nyva Vinnytsia)
—	MF	UKR	Illya Zubkov (Released)
—	MF	BRA	Wendel (Released)
—	FW	UKR	Artem Dudik (Released)

=== Mynai ===
In:

No.	Pos.	Nation	Player
—	DF	UKR	Serhiy Petko (from Chornomorets Odesa)
—	DF	UKR	Oleksandr Melnyk (from Oleksandriya)
—	MF	MDA	Mihail Ghecev (from Veres Rivne)
—	MF	UKR	Andriy Buleza (from Shakhtar Donetsk)
—	MF	UKR	Mykhaylo Shyshka (from Lviv)

Out:

No.	Pos.	Nation	Player
—	MF	UKR	Yevhen Yefremov (to (Lithuania) Sūduva)
—	MF	UKR	Oleksiy Khakhlyov (to Zorya Luhansk)
—	MF	UKR	Dmytro Kasimov (Released)
—	MF	SLO	Lovro Grajfoner (Released)
—	MF	UKR	Eldar Kuliyev (to (Azerbaijan) Sabah)

=== Oleksandriya ===
In:

No.	Pos.	Nation	Player
—	GK	UKR	Mykyta Shevchenko (from Zorya Luhansk)
—	DF	UKR	Serhiy Lohinov (from Dnipro-1)
—	MF	UKR	Mykola Mykhaylenko (loan from Dynamo Kyiv)
—	FW	UKR	Andriy Kulakov (from Shakhtar Donetsk)

Out:

No.	Pos.	Nation	Player
—	GK	UKR	Oleh Bilyk (to Inhulets)
—	DF	UKR	Maksym Dyachuk (loan return to Dynamo Kyiv)
—	DF	UKR	Oleksandr Melnyk (to Mynai)
—	MF	UKR	Denys Kostyshyn (to (United States) El Paso Locomotive)
—	MF	UKR	Oleksandr Demchenko (to Chornomorets Odesa)
—	MF	UKR	Kyrylo Dryshlyuk (Released)
—	MF	UKR	Artur Avahimyan (on loan to Chornomorets Odesa)

=== Rukh Lviv ===
In:

No.	Pos.	Nation	Player
—	DF	BRA	Jefferson Vinicius (from (Brazil) Grêmio)
—	MF	BRA	Edson (loan return from (Brazil) Atlético Goianiense)
—	MF	NGR	Bright Enobakhare (from (Israel) Hapoel Jerusalem)
—	FW	UKR	Vadym Solohub (loan return from Hirnyk-Sport Horishni Plavni)

Out:

No.	Pos.	Nation	Player
—	MF	NED	Lassana Faye (to (Canada) York United)
—	MF	UKR	Bohdan Boychuk (to Metalist Kharkiv)

=== Shakhtar Donetsk ===
In:

No.	Pos.	Nation	Player
—	GK	UKR	Dmytro Riznyk (from Vorskla Poltava)
—	MF	VEN	Kevin Kelsy (from (Uruguay) Boston River)
—	MF	UKR	Yaroslav Rakitskyi (from (Turkey) Adana Demirspor)
—	MF	GEO	Giorgi Gocholeishvili (from (Georgia (country)) Saburtalo Tbilisi)
—	MF	BRA	Maycon (loan return from (Brazil) Corinthians)
—	MF	BRA	Tetê (loan return from (France) Lyon)
—	MF	UKR	Danylo Honcharuk (loan return from (Spain) Lleida Esportiu)
—	MF	TJK	Khusrav Toirov (from (Kazakhstan) Atyrau)
—	FW	UKR	Vladyslav Vakula (loan return from Polissya Zhytomyr)
—	FW	UKR	Bohdan Vyunnyk (loan return from (Austria) Zürich)

Out:

No.	Pos.	Nation	Player
—	GK	UKR	Yevhen Hrytsenko (to (Armenia) Van)
—	DF	UKR	Serhiy Kryvtsov (to (United States) Inter Miami)
—	MF	UKR	Klim Prykhodko (to Kryvbas Kryvyi Rih)
—	MF	UKR	Mykhailo Mudryk (to (England) Chelsea)
—	MF	BRA	Tetê (loan to (England) Leicester)
—	MF	UKR	Andriy Buleza (to Mynai)
—	FW	UKR	Bohdan Vyunnyk (on loan to (Austria) Grazer AK)
—	FW	UKR	Andriy Kulakov (to Oleksandriya)

=== Veres Rivne ===
In:

No.	Pos.	Nation	Player
—	DF	UKR	Denys Balan (from (Slovakia) Zlaté Moravce)
—	DF	UKR	Ihor Huk (Loan return from Zvyahel-750)
—	DF	UKR	Danyil Khondak (from Hirnyk-Sport Horishni Plavni)
—	DF	UKR	Oleksandr Matkobozhyk (from Karpaty Lviv)
—	MF	UKR	Maksym Perekhodko (Loan return from Zvyahel-750)
—	MF	UKR	Oleksandr Savoshko (Loan return from Prykarpattia)
—	MF	UKR	Andriy Bliznichenko (from Inhulets Petrove)
—	MF	MDA	Mihail Ghecev (Loan return from (Moldova) Sfîntul Gheorghe)
—	FW	UKR	Vladyslav Tyshyninov (from Trostianets)

Out:

No.	Pos.	Nation	Player
—	DF	UKR	Roman Miroshnyk (Released)
—	MF	UKR	Yevhen Pasich (to Dnipro-1)
—	MF	UKR	Serhiy Shestakov (to LNZ Cherkasy)
—	MF	UKR	Yevhen Yefremov
—	FW	UKR	Mykhaylo Serhiychuk (to Bukovyna Chernivtsi)
—	MF	MDA	Mihail Ghecev (to Mynai)

=== Vorskla Poltava ===
In:

No.	Pos.	Nation	Player
—	GK	UKR	Ivan Ponomarenko (from Lviv)
—	DF	MLI	Ibrahim Kane (loan return from (China) Qingdao Hainiu)
—	MF	BRA	Ricardo Lopes (from (Japan) JEF United Chiba)
—	MF	BRA	Lucas Ramires (from (Brazil) Juventude)
—	FW	ENG	Rodel Richards (from (Bulgaria) Hebar Pazardzhik)

Out:

No.	Pos.	Nation	Player
—	GK	UKR	Dmytro Riznyk (to Shakhtar Donetsk)
—	DF	ALB	Ardit Toli (to (Georgia (country)) Torpedo Kutaisi)
—	MF	MKD	Gjoko Zajkov (to (Romania) Universitatea Craiova)
—	MF	MKD	Ennur Totre (on loan to (North Macedonia) Shkëndija)
—	MF	UKR	Maksym Melnychuk (to Inhulets Petrove)
—	FW	UKR	Yuriy Kozyrenko (to Inhulets Petrove)

=== Zorya Luhansk ===
In:

No.	Pos.	Nation	Player
—	GK	UKR	Vladyslav Kucheruk (from Dynamo Kyiv)
—	DF	UKR	Pavlo Polehenko (from Lviv)
—	DF	UKR	Vitaly Morokhovets (from Vorskla U21)
—	MF	UKR	Oleksiy Khakhlyov (from Mynai)
—	MF	UKR	Denys Pochapsky (from (Poland) Chojnice U19)
—	MF	UKR	Kyrylo Dryshlyuk (from Oleksandriya)
—	MF	UKR	Mykyta Burda (on loan from Dynamo Kyiv)
—	FW	UKR	Vladyslav Pohorily (on loan from Shakhtar U19)
—	FW	PAN	Eduardo Guerrero (on loan from (Israel) Maccabi Tel Aviv)

Out:

No.	Pos.	Nation	Player
—	GK	UKR	Mykyta Shevchenko (to Oleksandriya)
—	MF	BRA	Cristian (to (Serbia) Mladost)
—	MF	UKR	Maksym Lunyov (to Kryvbas Kryvyi Rih)
—	MF	UKR	Mykola Mykhaylenko (loan return to Dynamo Kyiv)
—	MF	UKR	Akhmed Alibekov (loan return to Dynamo Kyiv)
—	FW	UKR	Danyil Alefirenko (to Chornomorets Odesa)

== Ukrainian First League ==
=== Bukovyna Chernivtsi ===
In:

No.	Pos.	Nation	Player
—	GK	UKR	Mark Medvedev (from Motor)
—	MF	UKR	Yevhen Chepurnenko (from (Poland) Odra Wodzisław Śląski)
—	MF	UKR	Heorhiy Mytryk
—	FW	UKR	Oleksandr Hlahola (from Uzhhorod)
—	FW	UKR	Mykhaylo Serhiychuk (from Veres Rivne)

Out:

No.	Pos.	Nation	Player
—	GK	UKR	Vitaliy Chebotaryov
—	DF	UKR	Semen Datsenko
—	DF	UKR	Mykola Pavlyuk
—	MF	UKR	Yevhen Chepurnenko
—	MF	UKR	Ihor Chaykovskyi (to Metalist Kharkiv)
—	MF	UKR	Mykola Lyashenko (Retired)
—	MF	UKR	Andriy Shyshyhin
—	MF	UKR	Oleksandr Zhumyga
—	FW	UKR	Nikita Komisar
—	FW	UKR	Andriy Korolyanchuk

=== LNZ Cherkasy ===
In:

No.	Pos.	Nation	Player
—	GK	UKR	Ivan Dubovy (from Rukh Lviv U19)
—	MF	UKR	Denys Norenkov (from (Austria) WSC Hertha Wels)
—	MF	UKR	Serhiy Shestakov (from Veres Rivne)
—	MF	UKR	Illya Kovalenko (from (Kazakhstan) Akzhayik)
—	MF	UKR	Oleksandr Nasonov (from (Uzbekistan) Pakhtakor Tashkent)
—	MF	UKR	Nazariy Muravskyi (on loan from Lviv)
—	FW	UKR	Nazariy Nych (from Lviv)

Out:

No.	Pos.	Nation	Player
—	GK	AZE	Andrey Popovich (Released)
—	DF	UKR	Oleksandr Mihunov (to Skoruk Tomakivka)
—	DF	UKR	Serhiy Shvets (to Prykarpattia Ivano-Frankivsk)
—	DF	UKR	Vadym Chornyi (Released)
—	MF	UKR	Arsen Slotyuk (Released)
—	MF	UKR	Roman Tolochko (Released)
—	MF	UKR	Pavlo Zamurenko (to Poltava)
—	MF	UKR	Andriy Lyashenko (to Epitsentr Dunaivtsi)
—	FW	UKR	Maksym Tyapkin (to Nyva Ternopil)
—	FW	UKR	Vladyslav Voytsekhovskyi (Released)

=== FC Chernihiv ===
In:

No.	Pos.	Nation	Player
—	FW	UKR	Pavlo Fedosov (from Balkany Zorya)
—	MF	UKR	Kyrylo pinchuk (from Nyva Ternopil)

Out:

No.	Pos.	Nation	Player
—	MF	UKR	Vladyslav Panko (Released)

=== Dinaz Vyshhorod ===
In:

No.	Pos.	Nation	Player
—	MF	UKR	Andriy Solovyov (loan from Kolos Kovalivka)
—	MF	UKR	Danylo Basovskyi
—	FW	UKR	Bohdan Orynchak (from Prykarpattia Ivano-Frankivsk)

Out:

No.	Pos.	Nation	Player
—	DF	UKR	Oleksandr Litvinov (loan return to Kolos Kovalivka)
—	MF	UKR	Maksym Kulish (Released)
—	MF	UKR	Oleg Vakulenko (Released)
—	MF	UKR	Vladyslav Garnaga (to Skoruk Tomakivka)
—	MF	UKR	Oleh Vakulenko (Released)
—	MF	NGR	Nnabuihie Richmond Chukwuemek (Released)
—	MF	UKR	Bohdan Dukhota (loan return to Kolos Kovalivka)
—	MF	UKR	Serhiy Ichanskyi (Released)
—	FW	UKR	Yaroslav Bohunov (to Lviv)

=== Hirnyk-Sport Horishni Plavni ===
In:

No.	Pos.	Nation	Player
33	MF	UKR	Danylo Sydorenko (loan from Kremin Kremenchuk)

Out:

No.	Pos.	Nation	Player
—	GK	UKR	Maksym Kovalenko (Loan return to Metalist 1925 Kharkiv)
—	GK	UKR	Sergiy Dvornyk (Released)
—	DF	UKR	Yuriy Senytskyi (Released)
—	DF	UKR	Oleksiy Malaki (loan return to Kolos Kovalivka)
—	DF	UKR	Danyil Khondak (to Veres Rivne)
—	DF	UKR	Dmytro Shynkarenko (to Prykarpattia Ivano-Frankivsk)
—	MF	UKR	Suleyman Seytkhalilov (to Metalurh Zaporizhzhia)
—	FW	UKR	Vadym Solohub (loan return to Rukh Lviv)
23	DF	UKR	Antoniy Emere (loan return to Metalist 1925 Kharkiv)

=== Karpaty Lviv ===
In:

No.	Pos.	Nation	Player
—	GK	UKR	Oleksandr Ilyushchenkov (from Lviv)
—	MF	UKR	Ivan Bobko (from Chornomorets Odesa)
—	MF	UKR	Taras Sakiv (from Inhulets Petrove)
—	MF	UKR	Danylo Knysh (On Loan from Metalist Kharkiv)
—	MF	UKR	Serhiy Horbunov (from Dnipro-1)
—	FW	UKR	Oleksiy Khoblenko (On Loan from Kryvbas Kryvyi Rih)

Out:

No.	Pos.	Nation	Player
—	DF	UKR	Serhiy Siminin (Released)
—	DF	UKR	Oleksandr Matkobozhyk (to Veres Rivne)
—	MF	UKR	Yuriy Repeta (Released)
—	MF	UKR	Andriy Tkachuk (Released)

=== Kremin Kremenchuk ===
In:

No.	Pos.	Nation	Player
57	GK	UKR	Oleksii Slutskyi (from Obolon Kyiv)
7	MF	UKR	Myroslav Trofymiuk (Unattached)
41	MF	UKR	Yurii Dudnyk (from (Czech Republic) Baník Sokolov)
6	MF	UKR	Andrii Kireiev (from Nikopol)
77	MF	UKR	Dmytro Kasimov (from Mynai)

Out:

No.	Pos.	Nation	Player
69	GK	UKR	Daniil Yermolov (loan to Metalist Kharkiv)
99	MF	UKR	Radion Lisniak (loan to Vast Mykolaiv)
7	MF	UKR	Ivan Kuts (Released)
13	DF	UKR	Danylo Sydorenko (loan to Hirnyk-Sport Horishni Plavni)

=== FSC Mariupol ===
In:

No.	Pos.	Nation	Player
—	DF	UKR	Nikita Teplyakov
—	MF	UKR	Mykyta Makhynya (from Mariupol)

Out:

No.	Pos.	Nation	Player
—	MF	UKR	Danyil Strochynskyi (Released)

=== Metalurh Zaporizhzhia ===
In:

No.	Pos.	Nation	Player
—	MF	UKR	Suleyman Seytkhalilov (from Hirnyk-Sport Horishni Plavni)

Out:

No.	Pos.	Nation	Player
—	GK	UKR	Ihor Levchenko (to Khust)
—	DF	UKR	Anton Kicha (Released)
—	MF	UKR	Vladyslav Borysenko (Released)

=== Nyva Ternopil ===
In:

No.	Pos.	Nation	Player
—	DF	UKR	Kyrylo Pinchuk
—	DF	UKR	Serhiy Davydov
—	DF	UKR	Vasyl Tanchak
—	MF	UKR	Bogdan Lyanskoronskyi
—	MF	UKR	Maksym Tyapkin (from LNZ Cherkasy)
—	FW	UKR	Dmytro Haladey (from (Czech Republic) SK Vysoké Mýto)

Out:

No.	Pos.	Nation	Player
—	DF	UKR	Oleksandr Tarasov (Released)
—	MF	UKR	Ruslan Dedukh (Released)
—	FW	UKR	Danyil Sukhoruchko (Released)

=== Obolon Kyiv ===
In:

No.	Pos.	Nation	Player
—	GK	UKR	Maksym Borysyuk
—	DF	UKR	Serhiy Sukhanov (from Chornomorets Odesa)
—	MF	UKR	Vladyslav Mukhamatgaleyev (from Slovkhlib Slovyansk)
—	MF	UKR	Maksym Yermolenko (from Chornomorets Odesa)

Out:

No.	Pos.	Nation	Player
—	GK	UKR	Oleksiy Slutskyi (to Kremin Kremenchuk)

=== Poltava ===
In:

No.	Pos.	Nation	Player
—	MF	UKR	Pavlo Zamurenko (from LNZ Cherkasy)
—	MF	UKR	Yevgen Drozd (from Novi Sanzhary)

Out:

No.	Pos.	Nation	Player
—	MF	UKR	Valeriy Gayvan (loan return to Trostianets)
—	MF	UKR	Denys Rudenko (Released)
—	MF	UKR	Pavlo Pastukhov (Released)

=== Polissya Zhytomyr ===
In:

No.	Pos.	Nation	Player
—	MF	UKR	Borys Krushynskyi (from Lviv)

Out:

No.	Pos.	Nation	Player
—	FW	UKR	Vladyslav Vakula (loan return to Shakhtar Donetsk)

=== Prykarpattia Ivano-Frankivsk ===
In:

No.	Pos.	Nation	Player
—	MF	UKR	Dmytro Shynkarenko (from Hirnyk-Sport Horishni Plavni)
—	MF	UKR	Serhiy Shvets (from LNZ Cherkasy)

Out:

No.	Pos.	Nation	Player
—	DF	UKR	Oleksandr Aksyonov (Released)
—	DF	UKR	Oleksandr Savoshko (Loan return to Veres Rivne)
—	MF	UKR	Roman Dytko (Released)
—	MF	UKR	Bohdan Orynchak (to Dinaz Vyshhorod)
—	FW	UKR	Maksym Solovyov (loan return to Dnipro-1)

=== Skoruk Tomakivka ===
In:

No.	Pos.	Nation	Player
—	GK	UKR	Vladyslav Shapoval (from Niva Buzova)
—	MF	UKR	Oleksandr Mihunov (from LNZ Cherkasy)
—	MF	UKR	Andriy Slipukhin (on loan from Trostianets)
—	FW	UKR	Vladyslav Garnaga (from Dinaz Vyshhorod)
—	FW	UKR	Volodymyr Zdyrko
—	FW	UKR	Stanislav Kulish

Out:

No.	Pos.	Nation	Player
—	DF	UKR	Oleksiy Razuvayev (Retired)
—	DF	UKR	Kirill Pasichnik
—	DF	UKR	Mykhaylo Laptev
—	DF	UKR	Anton Sharko
—	MF	UKR	Denys Soroka

== Ukrainian Second League ==
=== SC Chaika ===
In:

No.	Pos.	Nation	Player

Out:

No.	Pos.	Nation	Player
—	MF	UKR	Sergiy Shyshkin (Released)
—	MF	UKR	Mykhaylo Tsebro (Released)

=== Dnipro Cherkasy ===
In:

No.	Pos.	Nation	Player

Out:

No.	Pos.	Nation	Player

=== Epitsentr Dunaivtsi ===
In:

No.	Pos.	Nation	Player
—	MF	UKR	Andriy Lyashenko (from LNZ Cherkasy)
—	MF	UKR	Andriy Pavluchenko

Out:

No.	Pos.	Nation	Player
—	DF	UKR	Taras Horilyi (Released)
—	MF	UKR	Rostyslav Morozov (Released)
—	MF	UKR	Kyrylo Kostenko (Released)

=== Khust ===
In:

No.	Pos.	Nation	Player
—	GK	UKR	Ihor Levchenko (from Metalurh Zaporizhzhia)

Out:

No.	Pos.	Nation	Player
—	MF	UKR	Yevgen Nechosov (Released)
—	MF	UKR	Vladyslav Lesunov (Released)

=== Metalurh-2 Zaporizhzhia ===
In:

No.	Pos.	Nation	Player

Out:

No.	Pos.	Nation	Player
—	MF	UKR	Oleg Yelets (to (Austria) Siegendor FC)

=== Mukachevo ===
In:

No.	Pos.	Nation	Player

Out:

No.	Pos.	Nation	Player

=== Nyva Buzova ===
In:

No.	Pos.	Nation	Player

Out:

No.	Pos.	Nation	Player
—	GK	UKR	Vladyslav Shapoval (to Skoruk Tomakiva)
—	MF	UKR	Kostyantyn Bezyazychnyi (Released)
—	MF	UKR	Danyil Tumko (Released)

=== Nyva Vinnytsia ===
In:

No.	Pos.	Nation	Player
—	GK	UKR	Maksym Kovalenko (loan from Metalist 1925 Kharkiv)
—	DF	BRA	Guilherme (from (Lithuania) Marijampolė City)

Out:

No.	Pos.	Nation	Player
—	MF	UKR	Igor Bilyk (Released)
—	MF	UKR	Mykyta Gavryk (Released)

=== Real Pharma Odesa ===
In:

No.	Pos.	Nation	Player

Out:

No.	Pos.	Nation	Player
—	MF	UKR	Dmytro Romanov (Loan return to Chornomorets Odesa)
—	MF	UKR	Anton Kicha (to Metalurh Zaporizhzhia)

=== Rubikon Kyiv ===
In:

No.	Pos.	Nation	Player

Out:

No.	Pos.	Nation	Player
—	DF	UKR	Pavlo Shostka (Released)
—	MF	UKR	Daniil Davydenko (Released)
—	MF	UKR	Vladyslav Pavlenko (to Zvyahel-750)
—	MF	UKR	Rudolf Sukhomlynov (Released)

=== Vast Mykolaiv ===
In:

No.	Pos.	Nation	Player
7	MF	UKR	Radion Lisniak (loan from Kremin Kremenchuk)

Out:

No.	Pos.	Nation	Player
7	MF	UKR	Viktor Berko (Released)
—	MF	UKR	Oleksiy Tyshchenko (Released)
—	MF	UKR	Yevgeniy Vitenko (Released)
—	MF	UKR	Mykola Stetsenko (Released)
—	MF	UKR	Oleksandr Tolgarenko (Released)

=== Zvyagel ===
In:

No.	Pos.	Nation	Player
—	MF	UKR	Vladyslav Pavlenko (from Rubikon Kyiv)
—	MF	UKR	Igor Guk (from Veres Rivne)
33	DF	UKR	Antoniy Emere (on loan from Metalist 1925 Kharkiv)

Out:

No.	Pos.	Nation	Player
—	MF	UKR	Igor Guk (loan return to Veres Rivne)
—	MF	UKR	Maksym Perekhodko (loan return to Veres Rivne)

== Omitted teams from the Ukrainian Premier League ==
=== Desna Chernihiv ===
In:

No.	Pos.	Nation	Player
—	FW	UKR	Illya Shevtsov (loan return from (United States) Charlotte)

Out:

No.	Pos.	Nation	Player
—	GK	UKR	Roman Mysak (to (Armenia) Ararat Yerevan)
—	FW	GRE	Georgios Ermidis (to (Russia) Znamya Truda)
—	FW	UKR	Illya Shevtsov (Released)

=== Mariupol ===
In:

No.	Pos.	Nation	Player

Out:

No.	Pos.	Nation	Player
—	MF	UKR	Mykyta Makhynya (to Yarud Mariupol)

== Omitted teams from the Ukrainian First League ==
=== Ahrobiznes Volochysk ===
In:

No.	Pos.	Nation	Player

Out:

No.	Pos.	Nation	Player

=== Alians Lypova Dolyna ===
In:

No.	Pos.	Nation	Player

Out:

No.	Pos.	Nation	Player

=== Kramatorsk ===
In:

No.	Pos.	Nation	Player

Out:

No.	Pos.	Nation	Player

=== Olimpik Donetsk ===
In:

No.	Pos.	Nation	Player

Out:

No.	Pos.	Nation	Player

=== FC Podillya Khmelnytskyi ===
In:

No.	Pos.	Nation	Player

Out:

No.	Pos.	Nation	Player

=== Uzhhorod ===
In:

No.	Pos.	Nation	Player

Out:

No.	Pos.	Nation	Player
—	MF	UKR	Oleksandr Hlahola (to Bukovyna Chernivtsi)

=== Volyn Lutsk ===
In:

No.	Pos.	Nation	Player

Out:

No.	Pos.	Nation	Player

== Omitted teams from the Ukrainian Second League ==
=== Balkany Zorya ===
In:

No.	Pos.	Nation	Player

Out:

No.	Pos.	Nation	Player
—	FW	UKR	Pavlo Fedosov (to Chernihiv)

=== FC Cherkashchyna ===
In:

No.	Pos.	Nation	Player

Out:

No.	Pos.	Nation	Player

=== Enerhiya Nova Kakhovka ===
In:

No.	Pos.	Nation	Player

Out:

No.	Pos.	Nation	Player

=== Karpaty Halych ===
In:

No.	Pos.	Nation	Player

Out:

No.	Pos.	Nation	Player

=== Livyi Bereh Kyiv ===
In:

No.	Pos.	Nation	Player

Out:

No.	Pos.	Nation	Player

=== Lyubomyr Stavyshche ===
In:

No.	Pos.	Nation	Player

Out:

No.	Pos.	Nation	Player

=== Nikopol ===
In:

No.	Pos.	Nation	Player

Out:

No.	Pos.	Nation	Player

=== Peremoha Dnipro ===
In:

No.	Pos.	Nation	Player
28	FW	UKR	Robert Hehedosh (loan return from (Armenia) Pyunik)

Out:

No.	Pos.	Nation	Player
28	FW	UKR	Robert Hehedosh (to (Malta) St. Lucia)

=== Sumy ===
In:

No.	Pos.	Nation	Player

Out:

No.	Pos.	Nation	Player

=== Tavriya Simferopol ===
In:

No.	Pos.	Nation	Player

Out:

No.	Pos.	Nation	Player

=== Trostianets ===
In:

No.	Pos.	Nation	Player
—	MF	UKR	Valeriy Gayvan (loan return from Poltava)

Out:

No.	Pos.	Nation	Player
—	MF	UKR	Valeriy Gayvan (Released)
—	MF	UKR	Andriy Slipukhin (loan to Skoruk Tomakivka)
—	FW	UKR	Vladyslav Tyshyninov (to Veres Rivne)

=== Viktoriya Mykolaivka ===
In:

No.	Pos.	Nation	Player

Out:

No.	Pos.	Nation	Player
