= 2021–22 SC Dnipro-1 season =

Dnipro-1
2021–22 season
- Chairman: Yuriy Bereza
- Manager: Igor Jovićević
- Stadium: Dnipro Arena
- Premier League: 3rd
- Ukrainian Cup: Quarter-finals
- Top goalscorer: League: Artem Dovbyk (14); All: Artem Dovbyk (14)
- Highest home attendance: 4,781 vs Zorya Luhansk (26 September 2021)
- Lowest home attendance: 1,100 vs Chornomorets Odesa (6 December 2021)
- Average home league attendance: 2,886 (6 December 2021)
Home colours	Away colours

The 2021–22 season was SC Dnipro-1's 5th season in existence and the club's 3rd consecutive season in the top flight of Ukrainian football. In addition to the domestic league, SC Dnipro-1 participated in the season's edition of the Ukrainian Cup. The season covered the period from 1 July 2021 to 30 June 2022.

== Season events ==
On 11 June 2021, Valeriy Luchkevych was signed on a free transfer from Oleksandriya, with the player joining Dnipro-1 on 1 July once his previous contract expires.

On 24 June 2021, Neven Đurasek was signed on a one-year loan deal from Dinamo Zagreb, with the player joining the club on 1 July once the summer transfer window opens.

On 25 June 2021, Oleksandr Pikhalyonok, who played the previous year on loan from Shakhtar Donetsk, signed a 4-year contract with the team from Dnipro, with the transfer being valued at €700,000.

On 25 June 2021, Andriy Tsurikov signed on a free transfer for Metalist Kharkiv, with the player joining the new club on 1 July after his contract expired.

On 30 June 2021, Nazariy Rusyn was signed on a one-year loan deal from Dynamo Kyiv, with the player joining the club on 1 July once the summer transfer window opens.

On 30 June 2021, four players left the club after their contracts expired. Oleksandr Safronov joined Desna Chernihiv, Zauri Makharadze joined Polissya Zhytomyr, Douglas joined Giresunspor, and Lucas Taylor joined PAOK.

On 1 July 2021, Bohdan Sarnavskyi was loaned out to Kryvbas Kryvyi Rih on a one-year long deal.

On 2 July 2021, Vagner Gonçalves was loaned out to Kryvbas Kryvyi Rih on a one-year long deal.

On 5 July 2021, Valentin Cojocaru was signed for €100,000 from Viitorul Constanța, with the Romanian goalkeeper signing a 2-year contract. On the same day, Yevhen Past was signed on a free transfer after his contract with Desna Chernihiv expired, with the player signing a 2-year contract.

On 12 July 2021, Mykyta Kravchenko was signed on a one-year loan deal from Dynamo Kyiv.

On 19 July 2021, Mario Ćuže, who played for Dnipro-1 in the second part of the previous season on loan from Dinamo Zagreb, signed another 1-year loan deal with the team.

On 21 July 2021, Dnipro-1 announced that a contract was signed with Parimatch who will be their main sponsor. For the first time in its 4-year history Dnipro-1 will have the logo of a sponsor shown in the front of the shirt. On the same day, the club presented its new kit for the season. The home kit is navy blue with blue sleeves. The away kit is school bus yellow. Goalkeeper kits are green, yellow, and sky blue.

On 23 July 2021, Oleksandr Byelyayev was loaned out to Gençlerbirliği on a one-year long deal.

On 28 July 2021, Vladyslav Dubinchak, who played for Dnipro-1 the previous season on loan from Dynamo Kyiv, signed another 1-year loan deal with the team.

On 15 August 2021, Oleksiy Hutsulyak was signed for €500,000 from Desna Chernihiv, with the Ukrainian midfielder signing a 4-year contract.

On 2 September 2021, Nélson Monte was signed on a free transfer from Rio Ave, with the Portuguese centre-back signing a 2-year contract with Dnipro-1.

On 27 December 2021, Dnipro-1 announced that Arseniy Batahov will be loaned out to Ukrainian First League club Polissya Zhytomyr until the end of the season.

On 30 December 2021, Bill, who played the second part of the previous season and the first half of the current season on loan from Flamengo, signed a 5-year contract with the team from Dnipro, with the transfer being valued at €300,000.

On 3 January 2022, Vladyslav Dubinchak, the usual left-back defender during the first half of the season, was returned from loan by Dynamo Kyiv after selling its main left-back Vitaliy Mykolenko to Everton.

== Squad ==
As of match played 10 December 2021

Number	Name	Nationality	Position	Date of birth (age)	Signed from	Signed in	Contract ends	Apps.	Goals
Goalkeepers
12	Valentin Cojocaru	(Romania)	GK	1 October 1995 (age 30)	(Romania) Viitorul Constanța	2021		14	0
33	Valeriy Yurchuk	(Ukraine)	GK	12 April 1990 (age 36)	(Ukraine) Naftovyk-Ukrnafta Okhtyrka	2017		82	0
Defenders
3	Volodymyr Adamyuk	(Ukraine)	DF	17 July 1991 (age 35)	(Ukraine) Lviv	2020		43	3
5	Nélson Monte	(Portugal)	DF	30 July 1995 (age 31)	(Portugal) Rio Ave	2021		9	0
11	Mykyta Kravchenko	(Ukraine)	DF	14 June 1997 (age 29)	(Ukraine) Dynamo Kyiv	2021		16	0
15	Serhiy Lohinov	(Ukraine)	DF	24 August 1990 (age 36)	(Ukraine) Volyn Lutsk	2017		130	10
24	Valeriy Luchkevych	(Ukraine)	DF	11 January 1996 (age 30)	(Ukraine) Oleksandriya	2021		15	0
39	Oleksandr Svatok	(Ukraine)	DF	27 September 1994 (age 31)	(Croatia) Hajduk Split	2020		42	1
47	Roman Vantukh	(Ukraine)	DF	4 July 1998 (age 28)	(Ukraine) Dynamo Kyiv	2022	2022	0	0
Midfielders
8	Ihor Kohut	(Ukraine)	MF	7 March 1996 (age 30)	(Ukraine) Dnipro	2017		128	37
9	Oleksiy Hutsulyak	(Ukraine)	MF	25 December 1997 (age 28)	(Ukraine) Desna Chernihiv	2021		13	4
14	Yehor Yarmolyuk	(Ukraine)	MF	1 March 2004 (age 22)	Academy	2020		21	1
20	Francisco Di Franco	(Argentina)	MF	28 January 1995 (age 31)	(Ukraine) Karpaty Lviv	2020		54	0
29	Oleksandr Nazarenko	(Ukraine)	MF	1 February 2000 (age 26)	(Ukraine) Dnipro	2018		94	18
30	Neven Đurasek	(Croatia)	MF	15 August 1998 (age 28)	(Croatia) Dinamo Zagreb	2021		19	0
76	Oleksandr Pikhalyonok	(Ukraine)	MF	7 May 1997 (age 29)	(Ukraine) Shakhtar Donetsk	2020		31	6
99	Bill	(Brazil)	MF	7 May 1999 (age 27)	(Brazil) Flamengo	2021		18	1
Forwards
7	Artem Dovbyk	(Ukraine)	FW	21 June 1997 (age 29)	(Denmark) Midtjylland	2020		45	24
25	Mario Ćuže	(Croatia)	FW	24 April 1999 (age 27)	(Croatia) Dinamo Zagreb	2021		28	9
28	Marc Gual	(Spain)	FW	13 March 1996 (age 30)	(Spain) Alcorcón	2022	2024	0	0
Players who left Dnipro-1 during the season
4	Vladyslav Dubinchak	(Ukraine)	DF	1 July 1998 (age 28)	(Ukraine) Dynamo Kyiv	2020		43	0
6	Arseniy Batahov	(Ukraine)	MF	5 March 2002 (age 24)	Academy	2019		46	1
31	Nazariy Rusyn	(Ukraine)	FW	25 October 1998 (age 27)	(Ukraine) Dynamo Kyiv	2021		10	2
44	Yevhen Past	(Ukraine)	GK	16 March 1988 (age 38)	(Ukraine) Desna Chernihiv	2021		4	0
97	Danylo Ihnatenko	(Ukraine)	MF	13 March 1997 (age 29)	(Ukraine) Shakhtar Donetsk	2020		34	4

== Transfers ==
=== In ===
==== Summer ====
Date	Position	Nationality	Name	From	Fee	Ref.
1 July 2021	DF	(Ukraine)	Valeriy Luchkevych	(Ukraine) Oleksandriya	Free transfer	
1 July 2021	MF	(Ukraine)	Oleksandr Pikhalyonok	(Ukraine) Shakhtar Donetsk	€700,000	
5 July 2021	GK	(Romania)	Valentin Cojocaru	(Romania) Viitorul Constanța	€100,000	
5 July 2021	GK	(Ukraine)	Yevhen Past	(Ukraine) Desna Chernihiv	Free transfer	
15 August 2021	MF	(Ukraine)	Oleksiy Hutsulyak	(Ukraine) Desna Chernihiv	€500,000	
2 September 2021	DF	(Portugal)	Nélson Monte	(Portugal) Rio Ave	Free transfer	

==== Winter ====
Date	Position	Nationality	Name	From	Fee	Ref.
1 January 2022	MF	(Brazil)	Bill	(Brazil) Flamengo	€300,000	
13 January 2022	FW	(Spain)	Marc Gual	(Spain) Alcorcón	Free transfer	

=== Loans in ===
==== Summer ====
Date from	Position	Nationality	Name	From	Date to	Ref.
1 July 2021	FW	(Ukraine)	Nazariy Rusyn	(Ukraine) Dynamo Kyiv	End of season	
6 July 2021	MF	(Croatia)	Neven Đurasek	(Croatia) Dinamo Zagreb	End of season	
12 July 2021	DF	(Ukraine)	Mykyta Kravchenko	(Ukraine) Dynamo Kyiv	End of season	
19 July 2021	FW	(Croatia)	Mario Ćuže	(Croatia) Dinamo Zagreb	End of season	
28 July 2021	DF	(Ukraine)	Vladyslav Dubinchak	(Ukraine) Dynamo Kyiv	End of season	

==== Winter ====
Date from	Position	Nationality	Name	From	Date to	Ref.
17 January 2022	DF	(Ukraine)	Roman Vantukh	(Ukraine) Dynamo Kyiv	End of season	

=== Out ===
==== Summer ====
Date	Position	Nationality	Name	To	Fee	Ref.
1 July 2021	DF	(Brazil)	Lucas Taylor	(Greece) PAOK	Free transfer	
1 July 2021	DF	(Brazil)	Douglas	(Turkey) Giresunspor	Free transfer	
1 July 2021	DF	(Ukraine)	Andriy Tsurikov	(Ukraine) Metalist Kharkiv	Free transfer	
1 July 2021	GK	(Georgia (country))	Zauri Makharadze	(Ukraine) Polissya Zhytomyr	Free transfer	
14 July 2021	DF	(Ukraine)	Oleksandr Safronov	(Ukraine) Desna Chernihiv	Free transfer	
16 July 2021	MF	(Ukraine)	Yuriy Vakulko	(Latvia) Riga	Free transfer	

==== Winter ====
Date	Position	Nationality	Name	To	Fee	Ref.
1 January 2022	FW	(Ukraine)	Oleksiy Khoblenko	(Ukraine) Kryvbas Kryvyi Rih	€300,000	
10 January 2022	GK	(Ukraine)	Yevhen Past	(Ukraine) Chornomorets Odesa	Free transfer	

=== Loans out ===
==== Summer ====
Date from	Position	Nationality	Name	From	Date to	Ref.
1 July 2021	GK	(Ukraine)	Bohdan Sarnavskyi	(Ukraine) Kryvbas Kryvyi Rih	End of season	
2 July 2021	MF	(Brazil)	Vagner Gonçalves	(Ukraine) Kryvbas Kryvyi Rih	End of season	
20 July 2021	DF	(Ukraine)	Oleksiy Khyzhnyak	(Ukraine) Nikopol	End of season	
20 July 2021	DF	(Ukraine)	Denys Soroka	(Ukraine) Nikopol	End of season	
20 July 2021	MF	(Ukraine)	Vladyslav Shynkarenko	(Ukraine) Nikopol	End of season	
21 July 2021	FW	(Ukraine)	Oleksiy Khoblenko	(Ukraine) Kryvbas Kryvyi Rih	31 December 2021	
23 July 2021	MF	(Ukraine)	Oleksandr Byelyayev	(Turkey) Gençlerbirliği	End of season	

==== Winter ====
Date from	Position	Nationality	Name	From	Date to	Ref.
1 January 2022	MF	(Ukraine)	Arseniy Batahov	(Ukraine) Polissya Zhytomyr	End of season	

=== Loans ended ===
==== Winter ====
Date	Position	Nationality	Name	Moving to	Ref.
31 December 2021	FW	(Ukraine)	Nazariy Rusyn	(Ukraine) Dynamo Kyiv	
3 January 2022	DF	(Ukraine)	Vladyslav Dubinchak	(Ukraine) Dynamo Kyiv	
30 January 2022	MF	(Ukraine)	Danylo Ihnatenko	(Ukraine) Shakhtar Donetsk	

=== Released ===
==== Summer ====
Date	Position	Nationality	Name	Joined	Date	Ref.
24 July 2021	MF	(Switzerland)	Griffin Sabatini	(Scotland) Gretna 2008	11 December 2021	

=== Overall transfer activity ===
==== Expenditure ====
Summer: ▼€1,300,000

Winter: ▼€300,000

Total: ▼€1,600,000

==== Income ====
Summer: ▲€0

Winter: ▲€300,000

Total: ▲€300,000

==== Net totals ====
Summer: ▼€1,300,000

Winter: €0

Total: ▼€1,300,000

== Friendlies ==
26 June 2021	Vorskla Poltava (Ukraine)	3 – 0	(Ukraine) Dnipro-1	Poltava, Ukraine
18:00 EET (UTC+2)	Chelyadin 26'; Puclin 64'; Stepanyuk 85'	Report		Stadium: Ltava

1 July 2021	Dnipro-1 (Ukraine)	7 – 2	(Ukraine) Nikopol	Dnipro, Ukraine
18:00 EET (UTC+2)	Veklych 13' (o.g.); Rubchynskyi 14'; Byelyayev 48', 52'; Rusyn 64'; Đurasek 78'; Luchkevych 87'	Report	Khyzhnyak 31' (pen.); Clovis 66'	Stadium: NTB Dnipro

2 July 2021	Dnipro-1 (Ukraine)	1 – 1	(Ukraine) Oleksandriya	Dnipro, Ukraine
18:00 EET (UTC+2)	Kohut 36'	Report	Odaryuk 9'	Stadium: Dnipro-Arena

10 July 2021	Dnipro-1 (Ukraine)	1 – 2	(Ukraine) Nikopol	Dnipro, Ukraine
10:30 EET (UTC+2)	Byelyayev 89'	Report	Shynkarenko 18' (pen.); Rohulin 41'	Stadium: NTB Dnipro

10 July 2021	Dnipro-1 (Ukraine)	0 – 0	(Ukraine) Kolos Kovalivka	Poltava, Ukraine
18:00 EET (UTC+2)		Report

17 July 2021	Dnipro-1 (Ukraine)	2 – 0	(Ukraine) Alians Lypova Dolyna	Dnipro, Ukraine
17:00 EET (UTC+2)	Bill 52'; Shynkarenko 63'	Report		Stadium: NTB Dnipro

18 July 2021	Dnipro-1 (Ukraine)	0 – 1	(Ukraine) Zorya Luhansk	Dnipro, Ukraine
19:00 EET (UTC+2)		Report	Zahedi 40'	Stadium: Dnipro-Arena

28 January 2022	Beroe Stara Zagora (Bulgaria)	1 – 2	(Ukraine) Dnipro-1	Lara, Antalya, Turkey
15:00 EET (UTC+2)	Dinkov 76'	Report	Rubchynskyi 22'; Adamyuk 40'	Stadium: Fanatic

== Competitions ==
=== Overall record ===
Competition	First match	Last match	Starting round	Record							
Competition	First match	Last match	Starting round	Pld	W	D	L	GF	GA	GD	Win %
Premier League	26 July 2021	21 May 2022	Matchday 1	18	13	1	4	35	17	+18	72.22
Ukrainian Cup	22 September 2021		Round of 32	2	2	0	0	4	1	+3	100.00
Total				20	15	1	4	39	18	+21	75.00

Last updated: 10 December 2021
Source: Competitions

=== Ukrainian Premier League ===
==== League table ====
Pos	Team	Pld	W	D	L	GF	GA	GD	Pts	Qualification or relegation
1	Shakhtar Donetsk	18	15	2	1	49	10	+39	47	Qualification for the Champions League group stage
2	Dynamo Kyiv	18	14	3	1	47	9	+38	45	Qualification for the Champions League second qualifying round
3	Dnipro-1	18	13	1	4	35	17	+18	40	Qualification for the Europa League play-off round
4	Zorya Luhansk	18	11	3	4	37	19	+18	36	Qualification for the Europa Conference League third qualifying round
5	Vorskla Poltava	18	9	6	3	30	18	+12	33	Qualification for the Europa Conference League second qualifying round

Source: upl.ua
Rules for classification: 1) Points; 2) Head-to-head points; 3) Head-to-head goal difference; 4) Head-to-head higher number of goals scored; 5) Goal difference; 6) higher number of goals scored; 7) Draw or "Golden match" if two teams tied for title (Article 22, paragraph 3).

==== Results summary ====
Overall								Home						Away					
Pld	W	D	L	GF	GA	GD	Pts	W	D	L	GF	GA	GD	W	D	L	GF	GA	GD
18	13	1	4	35	17	+18	40	8	0	1	22	8	+14	5	1	3	13	9	+4

Last updated: 10 December 2021.
Source: Results

==== Results by round ====
Round	1	2	3	4	5	6	7	8	9	10	11	12	13	14	15	16	17	18	19	20	21	22	23	24	25	26	27	28	29	30
Ground	A	A	H	A	H	A	A	H	H	A	H	A	H	A	H	H	H	A												
Result	D	W	W	L	W	W	L	W	L	W	W	L	W	W	W	W	W	W	C	C	C	C	C	C	C	C	C	C	C	C
Position	6	3	3	5	5	3	5	4	7	5	4	5	5	5	4	3	3	3	N/A	N/A	N/A	N/A	N/A	N/A	N/A	N/A	N/A	N/A	N/A	N/A

Updated to match(es) played on 10 December 2021. Source: Results
A = Away; H = Home; W = Win; D = Draw; L = Loss

==== Results ====
26 July 2021 1	Vorskla Poltava	2–2	Dnipro-1	Poltava
19:30 EEST (UTC+3)	Stepanyuk 7'; Kane (yellow card) 55'; Svatok 67' (o.g.); Yavorskyi (yellow card) 85'; Chelyadin (yellow card) 90'; Sklyar (yellow card) 90+6'	Report	Lohinov (yellow card) 46' (yellow-red card) 56'; Kohut (yellow card) 54'; Dovbyk 59', 72'; Nazarenko (yellow card) 90'; Past (yellow card) 90+5'	Stadium: Oleksiy Butovsky Vorskla Stadium; Attendance: 5,546; Referee: Yuriy Ivanov

31 July 2021 2	Chornomorets Odesa	0–3	Dnipro-1	Dnipro
19:30 EEST (UTC+3)	Dubko (yellow card) 19'; Kravchenko (yellow card) 39'	Report	Dubinchak (yellow card) 22'; Pikhalyonok 40'; Dubko 51' (o.g.); Adamyuk 61'; Đurasek (yellow card) 63'	Stadium: Dnipro-Arena; Attendance: 3,100; Referee: Viktor Kopiyevskyi
Note: Match played at the Dnipro-Arena in Dnipro, instead of Chornomorets Odesa's regular Chornomorets Stadium in Odesa.

7 August 2021 3	Dnipro-1	2–1	Mariupol	Dnipro
19:30 EEST (UTC+3)	Dovbyk 15'; Nazarenko 30'; Kravchenko (yellow card) 76'	Report	Drambayev (yellow card) 65' (yellow-red card) 81'; Mampassi (yellow card) 68'; Viunnyk 77'	Stadium: Dnipro-Arena; Attendance: 3,410; Referee: Hennadiy Serputko

14 August 2021 4	Desna Chernihiv	2–1	Dnipro-1	Chernihiv
19:30 EEST (UTC+3)	Bezborodko 30'; Tsymbalyuk (yellow card) 47'; Zaviyskyi 86'	Report	Adamyuk (yellow card) 33'; Di Franco (yellow card) 40' (yellow-red card) 59'; Lohinov (yellow card) 43'; Pikhalyonok (yellow card) 75' (red card) 75'; Dovbyk 79'	Stadium: Chernihiv Stadium; Attendance: 3,587; Referee: Kateryna Monzul

21 August 2021 5	Dnipro-1	2–0	Rukh Lviv	Dnipro
19:30 EEST (UTC+3)	Ihnatenko 27'; Nazarenko 35', (yellow card) 79'; Dovbyk (yellow card) 41'; Batahov (yellow card) 90+4'	Report	Karasyuk (yellow card) 39'; Mysyk (yellow card) 42'; Fedorchuk (yellow card) 59'	Stadium: Dnipro-Arena; Attendance: 3,344; Referee: Maksym Kozyryatskyi

28 August 2021 6	Metalist 1925 Kharkiv	1–2	Dnipro-1	Kharkiv
17:00 EEST (UTC+3)	Holodyuk (yellow card) 16'; Marlyson 36'; Kovalenko (yellow card) 68'; Fabinho (yellow card) 90+1'	Report	Di Franco (yellow card) 22'; Dubinchak (yellow card) 50'; Ihnatenko (yellow card) 57'; Ćuže 69' (pen.); Hutsulyak 90+2'	Stadium: OSC Metalist; Attendance: 6,536; Referee: Yevhen Aranovskyi

11 September 2021 7	Shakhtar Donetsk	2–0	Dnipro-1	Kyiv
19:30 EEST (UTC+3)	Fernando 15'; Maycon (yellow card) 29'; Traoré 87'	Report	Svatok (yellow card) 31'; Di Franco (yellow card) 60'	Stadium: NSC Olimpiyskiy; Attendance: 13,194; Referee: Andriy Kovalenko

18 September 2021 8	Dnipro-1	1–0	Veres Rivne	Dnipro
17:00 EEST (UTC+3)	Svatok (yellow card) 26'; Dovbyk (yellow card) 43'; Đurasek (yellow card) 61'; Ćuže 78'; Adamyuk (yellow card) 80'	Report	Serhiychuk (red card) 75'; Tymofiyenko (yellow card) 89'	Stadium: Dnipro-Arena; Attendance: 3,761; Referee: Ihor Paskhal

26 September 2021 9	Dnipro-1	0–4	Zorya Luhansk	Dnipro
17:00 EEST (UTC+3)	Di Franco (yellow card) 41'; Kohut (yellow card) 81' (red card) 83'; Kravchenko (yellow card) 87'; Cojocaru (yellow card) 87'	Report	Nazaryna (yellow card) 16'; Buletsa 22'; Favorov (yellow card) 29'; Kocherhin (yellow card) 55', (goal) 87', 90+5'; Khomchenovskyi (yellow card) 61'; Zahedi 90+1'	Stadium: Dnipro-Arena; Attendance: 4,781; Referee: Ihor Paskhal

2 October 2021 10	Lviv	0–1	Dnipro-1	Ternopil
17:00 EEST (UTC+3)	Hrysyo (yellow card) 31'; Romanchuk (yellow card) 37'; Zozulya (yellow card) 41'; Brikner (yellow card) 50'; Antwi (yellow card) 67'; Politylo (yellow card) 71'	Report	Dovbyk 2'; Ihnatenko (yellow card) 53'; Pikhalyonok (yellow card) 65'; Cojocaru (yellow card) 90+1'; Dubinchak (yellow card) 90+2'	Stadium: Roman Shukhevych Ternopil city stadium Attendance: 2,900; Referee: Viktor Kopiyevskyi
Note: Match played at the Roman Shukhevych Ternopil city stadium in Ternopil, instead of Lviv's regular Arena Lviv in Lviv.

16 October 2021 11	Dnipro-1	2–0	Kolos Kovalivka	Dnipro
19:30 EEST (UTC+3)	Đurasek (yellow card) 12'; Ihnatenko 23', (yellow card) 69'; Dovbyk 38'; Dubinchak (yellow card) 58'	Report	Bohdanov (yellow card) 36'; Lysenko (yellow card) 66'	Stadium: Dnipro-Arena; Attendance: 3,224; Referee: Yuriy Ivanov

24 October 2021 12	Dynamo Kyiv	2–0	Dnipro-1	Kyiv
17:00 EEST (UTC+3)	Andriyevskyi (yellow card) 40'; Tsyhankov 50'; Harmash 75'	Report	Ihnatenko (yellow card) 34'; Lohinov (yellow card) 68'	Stadium: NSC Olimpiyskiy; Attendance: 5,112; Referee: Dmytro Kryvushkin

1 November 2021 13	Dnipro-1	4–0	Mynai	Dnipro
17:00 EET (UTC+2)	Hutsulyak 9'; Dovbyk 14'; Pikhalyonok 30'; Batahov (yellow card) 46'; Rusyn 89'	Report	Honchar (yellow card) 22'; Kuliyev (yellow card) 53'; Matić (yellow card) 72'; Seleznyov (yellow card) 86'	Stadium: Dnipro-Arena; Attendance: 1,456; Referee: Oleksandr Omelchenko

7 November 2021 14	Inhulets Petrove	0–1	Dnipro-1	Kropyvnytskyi
14:00 EET (UTC+2)	Kovalyov (yellow card) 27'; Shyshka (yellow card) 30' (yellow-red card) 34'	Report	Dovbyk 26'; Dubinchak (yellow card) 69'; Luchkevych (yellow card) 85'	Stadium: Zirka Stadium; Attendance: 470; Referee: Serhiy Boyko

20 November 2021 15	Dnipro-1	3–1	Oleksandriya	Dnipro
19:30 EET (UTC+2)	Dovbyk 29' (pen.), 30'; Lohinov 41'; Pikhalyonok (yellow card) 49'; Svatok (yellow card) 59'; Hutsulyak (yellow card) 60'	Report	Babohlo 19'; Rybalka (yellow card) 40'; Kalyuzhnyi (yellow card) 45'; Miroshnichenko (yellow card) 83'	Stadium: Dnipro-Arena; Attendance: 2,277; Referee: Andriy Kovalenko

27 November 2021 16	Dnipro-1	5–1	Vorskla Poltava	Dnipro
19:30 EET (UTC+2)	Hutsulyak 1', 62'; Dovbyk (penalty missed) , 52', 54'; Pikhalyonok 58'; Ihnatenko (yellow card) 66'; Monte (yellow card) 76'	Report	Rangel (yellow card) 45+1'; Yakubu (yellow card) 63'; Ivan Pešić (yellow card) 74'; Kravchuk 84'	Stadium: Dnipro-Arena; Attendance: 2,618; Referee: Yevhen Aranovskyi

6 December 2021 17	Dnipro-1	3–1	Chornomorets Odesa	Odesa
19:30 EET (UTC+2)	Monte (yellow card) 15'; Pikhalyonok 19'; Nazarenko (yellow card) 54'; Dovbyk 64' (pen.); Ihnatenko 75'	Report	Isayenko 12'; Avahimyan (yellow card) 22'; Vachiberadze (yellow card) 33'; Tsitaishvili (yellow card) 41'; Putrya (yellow card) 51'; Kadiri (yellow card) 78'	Stadium: Chornomorets Stadium; Attendance: 1,100; Referee: Mykola Balakin
Note: Match played at the Chornomorets Stadium in Odesa, instead of Dnipro-1's regular Dnipro-Arena in Dnipro.

10 December 2021 18	Mariupol	0–3	Dnipro-1	Mariupol
17:00 EET (UTC+2)	Melichenko (yellow card) 30'; Kashchuk (yellow card) 33' (yellow-red card) 45+1'; Stasyuk (yellow card) 56'; Mampassi (yellow card) 75'	Report	Dovbyk 35' (pen.); Kravchenko (yellow card) 42'; Pikhalyonok (yellow card) 53', (goal) 75' (pen.); Bill 78'	Stadium: Volodymyr Boyko Stadium; Referee: Dmytro Kryvushkin

27 February 2022 19	Dnipro-1	Cancelled	Desna Chernihiv	Dnipro
EET (UTC+2)				Stadium: Dnipro-Arena

7 March 2022 20	Rukh Lviv	Cancelled	Dnipro-1	Lviv
EET (UTC+2)				Stadium: Arena Lviv

12 March 2022 21	Dnipro-1	Cancelled	Metalist 1925 Kharkiv	Dnipro
EET (UTC+2)				Stadium: Dnipro-Arena

19 March 2022 22	Dnipro-1	Cancelled	Shakhtar Donetsk	Dnipro
EET (UTC+2)				Stadium: Dnipro-Arena

2 April 2022 23	Veres Rivne	Cancelled	Dnipro-1
EET (UTC+2)

9 April 2022 24	Zorya Luhansk	Cancelled	Dnipro-1	Zaporizhzhia
EET (UTC+2)				Stadium: Slavutych-Arena

16 April 2022 25	Dnipro-1	Cancelled	Lviv	Dnipro
EET (UTC+2)				Stadium: Dnipro-Arena

23 April 2022 26	Kolos Kovalivka	Cancelled	Dnipro-1	Kovalivka
EET (UTC+2)				Stadium: Kolos Stadium

30 April 2022 27	Dnipro-1	Cancelled	Dynamo Kyiv	Dnipro
EET (UTC+2)				Stadium: Dnipro-Arena

7 May 2021 28	Mynai	Cancelled	Dnipro-1	Uzhhorod
EET (UTC+2)				Stadium: Avanhard Stadium

14 May 2022 29	Dnipro-1	Cancelled	Inhulets Petrove	Dnipro
EET (UTC+2)				Stadium: Dnipro-Arena

21 May 2022 30	Oleksandriya	Cancelled	Dnipro-1	Oleksandriya
EET (UTC+2)				Stadium: CSC Nika Stadium

=== Ukrainian Cup ===
22 September 2021 Round of 32	VPK-Ahro Shevchenkivka	1–2	Dnipro-1	Dnipro
17:00 EEST (UTC+3)	Koberidze (yellow card) 27'; Pashayev (yellow card) 41'; Vicente (yellow card) 45'; Sukhar 77'; Palyukh (yellow card) 84'	Report	Luchkevych (yellow card) 35'; Rusyn 37'; Yarmolyuk 50', (yellow card) 52'; Bill (yellow card) 76'	Stadium: Meteor Stadium; Attendance: 1,000; Referee: Dmytro Panchyshyn

1 December 2021 Round of 16	LNZ Cherkasy	0–2	Dnipro-1	Dnipro
19:00 EET (UTC+2)	Safonov (yellow card) 23'; Lopyryonok (yellow card) 90'	Report	Pikhalyonok 18'; Kohut 53'	Stadium: Dnipro-Arena; Attendance: 1,679; Referee: Roman Blavatskyi
Note: The match was to be held on 28 October 2021 at the LNZ Cherkasy's regular Central Stadium in Cherkasy, but was postponed due to the COVID-19 outbreak in the LNZ Cherkasy team.

2 March 2022 Quarterfinal	Dnipro-1	Cancelled	Vorskla Poltava	Dnipro
EEST (UTC+3)				Stadium: Dnipro-Arena

== Squad statistics ==
As of match played 10 December 2021

=== Appearances and goals ===
No.	Pos.	Player	Ukrainian Premier League		Ukrainian Cup		Total	
No.	Pos.	Player	Apps	Goals	Apps	Goals	Apps	Goals
3	DF	(Ukraine) Volodymyr Adamyuk	11	1	1	0	12	1
5	DF	(Portugal) Nélson Monte	8	0	1	0	9	0
7	FW	(Ukraine) Artem Dovbyk	17	14	1	0	18	14
8	MF	(Ukraine) Ihor Kohut	13	0	2	1	15	1
9	MF	(Ukraine) Oleksiy Hutsulyak	13	4	0	0	13	4
11	DF	(Ukraine) Mykyta Kravchenko	14	0	2	0	16	0
12	GK	(Romania) Valentin Cojocaru	14	0	0	0	14	0
14	MF	(Ukraine) Yehor Yarmolyuk	7	0	2	1	9	1
15	DF	(Ukraine) Serhiy Lohinov	10	1	2	0	12	1
20	MF	(Argentina) Francisco Di Franco	16	0	2	0	18	0
24	DF	(Ukraine) Valeriy Luchkevych	13	0	2	0	15	0
25	FW	(Croatia) Mario Ćuže	14	2	1	0	15	2
28	FW	(Spain) Marc Gual	0	0	0	0	0	0
29	MF	(Ukraine) Oleksandr Nazarenko	16	2	0	0	16	2
30	MF	(Croatia) Neven Đurasek	18	0	1	0	19	0
33	GK	(Ukraine) Valeriy Yurchuk	0	0	2	0	2	0
39	DF	(Ukraine) Oleksandr Svatok	18	0	1	0	19	0
47	DF	(Ukraine) Roman Vantukh	0	0	0	0	0	0
76	MF	(Ukraine) Oleksandr Pikhalyonok	14	5	2	1	16	6
99	MF	(Brazil) Bill	11	1	2	0	13	1
Players have left the club
4	DF	(Ukraine) Vladyslav Dubinchak	16	0	2	0	18	0
6	MF	(Ukraine) Arseniy Batahov	3	0	2	0	5	0
31	FW	(Ukraine) Nazariy Rusyn	8	1	2	1	10	2
44	GK	(Ukraine) Yevhen Past	4	0	0	0	4	0
97	MF	(Ukraine) Danylo Ihnatenko	14	3	1	0	15	3

Last updated: 10 December 2021.
Source: FBref.com

=== Goalscorers ===
Rank	No.	Pos.	Player	Ukrainian Premier League	Ukrainian Cup	Total
1	7	FW	(Ukraine) Artem Dovbyk	14	0	14
2	76	MF	(Ukraine) Oleksandr Pikhalyonok	5	1	6
3	9	MF	(Ukraine) Oleksiy Hutsulyak	4	0	4
4	97	MF	(Ukraine) Danylo Ihnatenko	3	0	3
5	25	FW	(Croatia) Mario Ćuže	2	0	2
5	29	MF	(Ukraine) Oleksandr Nazarenko	2	0	2
5	31	FW	(Ukraine) Nazariy Rusyn	1	1	1
8	3	DF	(Ukraine) Volodymyr Adamyuk	1	0	1
8	8	MF	(Ukraine) Ihor Kohut	0	1	1
8	14	MF	(Ukraine) Yehor Yarmolyuk	0	1	1
8	15	DF	(Ukraine) Serhiy Lohinov	1	0	1
8	99	MF	(Brazil) Bill	1	0	1
Own goals				1	0	1
Totals				35	4	39

Last updated: 10 December 2021.
Source: FBref.com

=== Clean sheets ===
Rank	No.	Pos.	Player	Ukrainian Premier League	Ukrainian Cup	Total
1	12	GK	(Romania) Valentin Cojocaru	7	0	7
2	44	GK	(Ukraine) Yevhen Past	1	0	1
2	33	GK	(Ukraine) Valeriy Yurchuk	0	1	1
Totals				8	1	9

Last updated: 10 December 2021.
Source: FBref.com

=== Disciplinary record ===
No.	Pos.	Player	Ukrainian Premier League			Ukrainian Cup			Total		
No.	Pos.	Player	Booked	(yellow card) (yellow-red card)	Sent off (straight red)	Booked	(yellow card) (yellow-red card)	Sent off (straight red)	Booked	(yellow card) (yellow-red card)	Sent off (straight red)
3	DF	(Ukraine) Volodymyr Adamyuk	2	0	0	0	0	0	2	0	0
4	DF	(Ukraine) Vladyslav Dubinchak	5	0	0	0	0	0	5	0	0
5	DF	(Portugal) Nélson Monte	2	0	0	0	0	0	2	0	0
6	MF	(Ukraine) Arseniy Batahov	2	0	0	0	0	0	2	0	0
7	FW	(Ukraine) Artem Dovbyk	2	0	0	0	0	0	2	0	0
8	MF	(Ukraine) Ihor Kohut	2	0	1	0	0	0	2	0	1
9	MF	(Ukraine) Oleksiy Hutsulyak	1	0	0	0	0	0	1	0	0
11	DF	(Ukraine) Mykyta Kravchenko	3	0	0	0	0	0	3	0	0
12	GK	(Romania) Valentin Cojocaru	2	0	0	0	0	0	2	0	0
14	MF	(Ukraine) Yehor Yarmolyuk	0	0	0	1	0	0	1	0	0
15	DF	(Ukraine) Serhiy Lohinov	4	1	1	0	0	0	4	1	1
20	MF	(Argentina) Francisco Di Franco	5	1	1	0	0	0	5	1	1
24	DF	(Ukraine) Valeriy Luchkevych	1	0	0	1	0	0	2	0	0
25	FW	(Croatia) Mario Ćuže	0	0	0	0	0	0	0	0	0
28	FW	(Spain) Marc Gual	0	0	0	0	0	0	0	0	0
29	MF	(Ukraine) Oleksandr Nazarenko	3	0	0	0	0	0	3	0	0
30	MF	(Croatia) Neven Đurasek	3	0	0	0	0	0	3	0	0
31	FW	(Ukraine) Nazariy Rusyn	0	0	0	0	0	0	0	0	0
33	GK	(Ukraine) Valeriy Yurchuk	0	0	0	0	0	0	0	0	0
39	DF	(Ukraine) Oleksandr Svatok	3	0	0	0	0	0	3	0	0
44	GK	(Ukraine) Yevhen Past	0	0	0	0	0	0	0	0	0
47	DF	(Ukraine) Roman Vantukh	0	0	0	0	0	0	0	0	0
76	MF	(Ukraine) Oleksandr Pikhalyonok	4	0	1	0	0	0	4	0	1
97	MF	(Ukraine) Danylo Ihnatenko	5	0	0	0	0	0	5	0	0
99	MF	(Brazil) Bill	0	0	0	1	0	0	1	0	0
Totals			49	2	4	3	0	0	52	2	4

Last updated: 10 December 2021.
Source: FBref.com
