= 2023–24 FC Metalist 1925 Kharkiv season =

FC Metalist 1925 Kharkiv
2023–24 season
- Head coach: Oleh Holodyuk
- Stadium: Olimpiyskiy National Sports Complex
- Ukrainian Premier League: 11th
- Ukrainian Cup: Round of 16
- Top goalscorer: League: Andriy Boryachuk; Dmytro Yusov (3 each); All: Andriy Boryachuk; Dmytro Yusov (3 each)
- Biggest defeat: Metalist 1925 Kharkiv 0–3 Vorskla Poltava
- All statistics correct as of 25 November 2023.

The 2023–24 season was FC Metalist 1925 Kharkiv's 97th season in existence and third consecutive in the Ukrainian Premier League. They are also competed in the Ukrainian Cup.

== Players ==
=== First-team squad ===
As of 27 September 2023

Note: Flags indicate national team as defined under FIFA eligibility rules; some limited exceptions apply. Players may hold more than one non-FIFA nationality.

No.	Pos.	Nation	Player
1	GK	UKR	Denys Sydorenko
2	DF	UKR	Dmytro Kapinus (on loan from Shakhtar Donetsk)
3	DF	UKR	Yevheniy Tkachuk
4	DF	UKR	Ivan Kovalenko
5	DF	UKR	Mykhaylo Rudavskyi
6	MF	UKR	Beka Vachiberadze
7	FW	BRA	Ari Moura (on loan from Metropolitano)
8	MF	UKR	Yaroslav Martynyuk
9	FW	UKR	Andriy Boryachuk
10	MF	UKR	Rostyslav Rusyn
11	FW	UKR	Andriy Remenyuk
12	GK	UKR	Ihor Potimkov
14	FW	UKR	Dmytro Yusov
15	MF	UKR	Abdulla Abdullayev
17	DF	UKR	Ihor Kurylo
19	DF	UKR	Andriy Tkachuk

No.	Pos.	Nation	Player
20	DF	UKR	Vadym Chervak
21	FW	UKR	Kostyantyn Bychek
22	FW	UKR	Vladyslav Dmytrenko
23	DF	UKR	Ruslan Tkachenko
27	MF	UKR	Dmytro Kravchenko
28	MF	UKR	Artem Habelok (captain)
29	DF	UKR	Maksym Zhychykov
30	DF	UKR	Mykyta Bezuhlyi
31	MF	BRA	Leo Casaes
33	MF	BRA	Igor Henrique
37	GK	UKR	Oleh Mozil
74	DF	UKR	Maryan Faryna (on loan from Shakhtar Donetsk)
79	FW	UKR	Andriy Chyruk
88	FW	UKR	Vadym Solohub
97	FW	UKR	Oleksiy Sydorov

=== Out on loan ===
Note: Flags indicate national team as defined under FIFA eligibility rules; some limited exceptions apply. Players may hold more than one non-FIFA nationality.

No.	Pos.	Nation	Player
—	GK	UKR	Maksym Kovalenko (at Zviahel until 30 June 2024)
—	DF	UKR	Yuriy Potimkov (at Nyva Buzova until 30 June 2024)

No.	Pos.	Nation	Player
—	FW	UKR	Vladyslav Ostrovskyi (at Vorskla Poltava until 30 June 2024)

== Transfers ==
=== In ===
Pos.	Player	Transferred from	Fee	Date	Source
FW	(Ukraine) Dmytro Yusov	(Ukraine) Chornomorets Odesa	Free	8 July 2023	
MF	(Brazil) Ari Moura	(Brazil) Clube Atlético Metropolitano	Loan	14 July 2023	
FW	(Ukraine) Oleksiy Sydorov	(Ukraine) Metalurh Zaporizhzhia	€275,000	20 July 2023	
FW	(Ukraine) Andriy Boryachuk	(Ukraine) Shakhtar Donetsk	Free	1 September 2023	

=== Out ===
Pos.	Player	Transferred to	Fee	Date	Source

== Pre-season and friendlies ==
Win Draw Loss Fixtures

3 July 2023 Friendly	Metalist 1925 Kharkiv (Ukraine)	2–0	(Ukraine) SC Chaika
10:30

8 July 2023 Friendly	Veres Rivne (Ukraine)	1–0	(Ukraine) Metalist 1925 Kharkiv
15:00

15 July 2023 Friendly	Metalist 1925 Kharkiv (Ukraine)	1–0	(Ukraine) Ahrobiznes Volochysk
17:00

21 July 2023 Friendly	Rukh Lviv (Ukraine)	2–0	(Ukraine) Metalist 1925 Kharkiv
11:00

18 November 2023 Friendly	Obolon Kyiv (Ukraine)	2–1	(Ukraine) Metalist 1925 Kharkiv
13:00

== Competitions ==
Competition	First match	Last match	Starting round	Final position	Record							
Competition	First match	Last match	Starting round	Final position	Pld	W	D	L	GF	GA	GD	Win %
Ukrainian Premier League	29 July 2023	25 May 2024	Matchday 1		17	4	3	10	17	28	−11	23.53
Ukrainian Cup	27 September 2023		Round of 16	Round of 16	1	0	0	1	0	3	−3	0.00
Total					18	4	3	11	17	31	−14	22.22

Last updated: 11 December 2023
Source: Soccerway

=== Ukrainian Premier League ===
==== League table ====
Pos	Team	Pld	W	D	L	GF	GA	GD	Pts	Qualification or relegation
12	Chornomorets Odesa	30	10	2	18	38	47	−9	32 (Note: Zorya Luhansk finished ahead of Kolos Kovalivka and Chornomorets Odesa on head-to-head points: Zorya Luhansk 7, Kolos Kovalivka 6, Chornomorets Odesa 4)	
13	Veres Rivne (O)	30	6	10	14	31	46	−15	28	Qualification for the Relegation play-off
14	Obolon Kyiv (O)	30	5	11	14	18	41	−23	26	Qualification for the Relegation play-off
15	Mynai (R)	30	5	10	15	27	50	−23	25	Qualification for the mini tournament
16	Metalist 1925 Kharkiv (R)	30	5	8	17	32	57	−25	23	Qualification for the mini tournament

Source: upl.ua
Rules for classification: 1) Points; 2) Head-to-head points; 3) Head-to-head goal difference; 4) Head-to-head goals scored; 5) Goal difference; 6) Goals scored; 7) Draw or "Golden match" if two teams tied for title (Article 22, paragraph 3).
(O) Play-off winners; (R) Relegated

==== Results summary ====
Overall								Home						Away					
Pld	W	D	L	GF	GA	GD	Pts	W	D	L	GF	GA	GD	W	D	L	GF	GA	GD
17	4	3	10	17	28	−11	15	3	1	3	7	10	−3	1	2	7	10	18	−8

Last updated: 11 December 2023.

==== Results by round ====
Round	1	2	3	4	5	6	7	8	9	10	11	12	13	14	15	16
Ground	H	A	A	H	A	A	H	H	A	A	H	A	H	A	A	A
Result	L	L	P	W	W	D	W	D	L	L	L	D	W	L	L	
Position																

Updated to match(es) played on 25 November 2023. Source:
A = Away; H = Home; W = Win; D = Draw; L = Loss; P = Postponed

==== Matches ====
29 July 2023 1	Metalist 1925 Kharkiv	1–2	Shakhtar Donetsk	Kyiv
17:00				Stadium: Stadion Livyi Bereh; Referee: Vitaliy Romanov

5 August 2023 2	Oleksandriya	1–0	Metalist 1925 Kharkiv	Oleksandriya
20:15				Stadium: CSC Nika Stadium; Referee: Vladimir Novokhatny

19 August 2023 4	Metalist 1925 Kharkiv	1–0	Mynai	Kyiv
17:00				Stadium: Stadion Livyi Bereh; Referee: Klym Zabroda

25 August 2023 5	LNZ Cherkasy	0–1	Metalist 1925 Kharkiv	Cherkasy
15:00				Stadium: Cherkasy Arena; Referee: Yaroslav Kozyk

3 September 2023 6	Rukh Lviv	1–1	Metalist 1925 Kharkiv	Lviv
19:00				Stadium: Arena Lviv; Referee: Sergiy Zadyran

15 September 2023 7	Metalist 1925 Kharkiv	2–1	Zorya Luhansk	Kyiv
18:30				Stadium: Stadion Livyi Bereh; Referee: Klym Zabroda

24 September 2023 8	Metalist 1925 Kharkiv	0–0	Kolos Kovalivka	Kyiv
17:00				Stadium: Stadion Livyi Bereh; Referee: Mykhailo Rayda

2 October 2023 9	Dnipro-1	1–0	Metalist 1925 Kharkiv	Dnipro
17:00				Stadium: Dnipro Arena; Referee: Roman Blavatskiy

8 October 2023 10	Obolon Kyiv	1–0	Metalist 1925 Kharkiv	Kyiv
13:00				Stadium: Obolon Arena

20 October 2023 11	Metalist 1925 Kharkiv	1–3	Kryvbas Kryvyi Rih	Kyiv
19:00				Stadium: Stadion Livyi Bereh

29 October 2023 12	Vorskla Poltava	2–2	Metalist 1925 Kharkiv	Poltava
15:00				Stadium: Oleksiy Butovsky Vorskla Stadium

5 November 2023 13	Metalist 1925 Kharkiv	2–1	Chornomorets Odesa	Kyiv
15:00				Stadium: Stadion Livyi Bereh

11 November 2023 14	Polissya Zhytomyr	2–1	Metalist 1925 Kharkiv	Zhytomyr
16:15				Stadium: Tsentralnyi Stadion

25 November 2023 15	Veres Rivne	4–3	Metalist 1925 Kharkiv	Rivne
15:00				Stadium: Avanhard Stadium; Referee: Vitaliy Romanov

3 December 2023 16	Shakhtar Donetsk	2–0	Metalist 1925 Kharkiv	Lviv
17:00	Zubkov 59'; Kryskiv 78' (pen.)	Report		Stadium: Arena Lviv; Referee: Maksim Kozyryatskiy

7 December 2023 3	Dynamo Kyiv	4–2	Metalist 1925 Kharkiv	Kyiv
17:00	Voloshyn 11', 22'; Vanat 34'; Dyachuk 90'	Report	Dmytrenko 30'; Remenyuk 71'	Stadium: Valeriy Lobanovskyi Dynamo Stadium; Referee: Alexander Omelchenko

11 December 2023 17	Metalist 1925 Kharkiv	0–3	Oleksandriya	Kyiv
14:00 CET (UTC+1)		Report	Skorko 64'; Plaksa 75', 83'	Stadium: Stadion Livyi Bereh; Referee: Oleksandr Solovyan

=== Ukrainian Cup ===
27 September 2023	Metalist 1925 Kharkiv	0–3	Vorskla Poltava
18:30
