= 2007–08 AS Nancy Lorraine season =

Nancy
2007–08 season
- President: Jacques Rousselot
- Head coach: Pablo Correa
- Stadium: Stade de la Beaujoire
- Ligue 1: 4th
- Coupe de France: Round of 32
- Coupe de la Ligue: Quarter-finals
- Top goalscorer: League: All: Youssouf Hadji; Marc-Antoine Fortuné (7 each)
Home colours	Away colours

The 2007–08 season was the 98th season in the history of AS Nancy Lorraine and the club's third consecutive season in the top flight of French football. In addition to the domestic league, Nancy participated in this season's editions of the Coupe de France and Coupe de la Ligue.

== Competitions ==
=== Overall record ===
Competition	First match	Last match	Starting round	Final position	Record							
Competition	First match	Last match	Starting round	Final position	Pld	W	D	L	GF	GA	GD	Win %
Ligue 1	4 August 2007	15 May 2008	Matchday 1	4th	38	15	15	8	44	30	+14	39.47
Coupe de France	5 January 2008	3 February 2008	Round of 64	Round of 32	2	1	0	1	3	3	+0	50.00
Coupe de la Ligue	25 September 2007	16 January 2008	Third round	Quarter-finals	3	2	0	1	4	3	+1	66.67
Total					43	18	15	10	51	36	+15	41.86

Source: Competitions

=== Ligue 1 ===
==== League table ====
Pos	Team	Pld	W	D	L	GF	GA	GD	Pts	Qualification or relegation
2	Bordeaux	38	22	9	7	65	38	+27	75	Qualification to Champions League group stage
3	Marseille	38	17	11	10	58	45	+13	62	Qualification to Champions League third qualifying round
4	Nancy	38	15	15	8	44	30	+14	60	Qualification to UEFA Cup first round
5	Saint-Étienne	38	16	10	12	47	34	+13	58	Qualification to UEFA Cup first round
6	Rennes	38	16	10	12	47	44	+3	58	Qualification to Intertoto Cup third round

Source: Ligue 1
Rules for classification: 1) points; 2) goal difference; 3) number of goals scored.

==== Results summary ====
Overall								Home						Away					
Pld	W	D	L	GF	GA	GD	Pts	W	D	L	GF	GA	GD	W	D	L	GF	GA	GD
0	0	0	0	0	0	0	0	0	0	0	0	0	0	0	0	0	0	0	0

Source: Ligue 1

==== Results by round ====
Round	1	2	3	4	5	6	7	8	9	10
Ground	A	H	H	A	H	A	H	A	H	A
Result	W	W	W	D	W	D	W	L	W	W
Position										

Source: Ligue 1
A = Away; H = Home; W = Win; D = Draw; L = Loss

==== Matches ====
–

–

–

–

–

=== Coupe de France ===
–

=== Coupe de la Ligue ===
–
