= Shynkarenko =

Shynkarenko (Ukrainian: Шинкаренко) is a Ukrainian surname. It is an occupational surname of patronymic derivation, based on the occupation of shynkar (шинкар), or 'saloon keeper' and literally meaning "child of saloon keeper". Other Ukrainian surnames of similar derivation are Shynkar and Shynkaruk.

It may refer to the following people:

- Alina Shynkarenko (born 1998), Ukrainian synchronised swimmer
- Dmytro Shynkarenko (born 2000), Ukrainian football player
- Igor Shinkarenko (born 1956), Russian football player and manager
- Tetyana Shynkarenko (born 1978), Ukrainian handball player
- Viktoriia Shynkarenko (born 1995), Ukrainian rhythmic gymnast
- Vladyslav Shynkarenko (born 2001), Ukrainian football player
