= Danylo Sydorenko =

Danylo Sydorenko may refer to:

- Danylo Sydorenko (footballer, born 2003), Ukrainian footballer
- Danylo Sydorenko (footballer, born 1999), Ukrainian footballer
