= Vladyslav Pavlenko =

Ukrainian footballer

Personal information
- Full name: Vladyslav Vitaliyovych Pavlenko
- Date of birth: 5 April 1994 (age 32)
- Place of birth: Nikopol, Ukraine
- Height: 1.68 m (5 ft 6 in)
- Position: Midfielder

Team information
- Current team: Bohun Brody

Youth career
- 2006–2008: Nikopol-98 Nikopol
- 2010–2011: UFK Dnipropetrovsk

Senior career*
Years	Team	Apps	(Gls)
2011–2014	Tavriya Simferopol	31	(0)
2014	Hoverla Uzhhorod	4	(0)
2015	Vitebsk	23	(0)
2016	Navbahor Namangan	9	(0)
2016–2017	Mash'al Mubarek	17	(0)
2017	Surkhon Termez		
2018	Mash'al Mubarek		
2018	Nikopol	3	(0)
2019	Uzhhorod	19	(0)
2020	Aragats	3	(0)
2020–2021	Speranța Nisporeni	23	(1)
2022	Lyubomyr Stavyshche	0	(0)
2022	Rubikon Kyiv	5	(0)
2023	Zviahel	5	(0)
2023	Vast Mykolaiv	2	(0)
2023–	Bohun Brody (amateur)		

International career
2012–2013	Ukraine U19	9	(2)
2014	Ukraine U21	2	(0)
- * Club domestic league appearances and goals as of 31 December 2023

Vladyslav Vitaliyovych Pavlenko (Ukrainian: Владислав Віталійович Павленко; born 5 April 1994) is a Ukrainian professional footballer who plays as a midfielder for Bohun Brody.

== Career ==
Pavlenko made his debut for Tavriya Simferopol played in the main-squad team against Karpaty Lviv on 3 March 2013 in Ukrainian Premier League.
