= Maksym Perekhodko =

Ukrainian footballer

Personal information
- Full name: Maksym Serhiyovych Perekhodko
- Date of birth: 31 March 2002 (age 24)
- Place of birth: Ukraine
- Height: 1.82 m (6 ft 0 in)
- Position: Central midfielder

Team information
- Current team: Podillya Khmelnytskyi
- Number: 9

Youth career
- 2013–2017: Metalist Kharkiv
- 2017–2019: Skala Morshyn

Senior career*
Years	Team	Apps	(Gls)
2020	Zarichne	8	(2)
2021	ODEK Orzhiv	6	(0)
2021–2022	Veres Rivne	0	(0)
2022	→ Zviahel (loan)	8	(0)
2023–2025	Trostianets	10	(1)
2026–	Podillya Khmelnytskyi	7	(1)
- * Club domestic league appearances and goals as of 4 June 2026

Maksym Serhiyovych Perekhodko (Ukrainian: Максим Сергійович Переходько; born 31 March 2002) is a Ukrainian professional footballer who plays as a central midfielder for Ukrainian First League club Podillya Khmelnytskyi.
