= 2007–08 Ligue 1 =

70th season of top-tier French football

Ligue 1
- Season: 2007–08
- Dates: 4 August 2007 – 17 May 2008
- Champions: Lyon (7th title)
- Runner up: Bordeaux
- Relegated: Lens; Strasbourg; Metz
- Champions League: Lyon; Bordeaux; Marseille
- UEFA Cup: Nancy; Saint-Étienne; Paris Saint-Germain
- Intertoto Cup: Rennes
- Matches: 380
- Goals: 868 (2.28 per match)
- Top goalscorer: Karim Benzema (20 goals)

The 2007–08 Ligue 1 season was the seventieth since its establishment, and started in August 2007 and ended on 17 May 2008. The fixtures were announced in June 2007. Lyon became French champions, having won a record seventh consecutive title.

== Participating teams ==
Location of teams in 2006–07 Ligue 1

=== Promotion and relegation ===
Lens, Strasbourg and Metz were relegated to Ligue 2. The three relegated teams will be replaced by the three promoted teams from Ligue 2. Le Havre were promoted as Ligue 2 champions along with Nantes, who finished in second place, and third-placed Grenoble.

=== Stadiums ===
Club	Location	Venue	Capacity	Avg. attendance
Auxerre	Auxerre	Stade de l'Abbé-Deschamps	24,493	9,613
Bordeaux	Bordeaux	Stade Chaban-Delmas	34,327	24,689
Caen	Caen	Stade Michel d'Ornano	21,500	19,526
Le Mans	Le Mans	Stade Léon-Bollée	17,500	10,589
Lens	Lens	Stade Félix-Bollaert	41,233	33,717
Lille	Villeneuve d'Ascq	Stade Lille-Metropole	21,803	17,553
Lorient	Lorient	Stade du Moustoir	16,669	12,101
Lyon	Lyon	Stade Gerland	43,051	36,968
Marseille	Marseille	Stade Vélodrome	60,031	52,009
Metz	Metz	Stade Municipal Saint-Symphorien	26,671	13,401
Monaco	Fontvieille	Stade Louis II	18,500	10,570
Nancy	Tomblaine	Stade Marcel Picot	20,087	18,591
Nice	Nice	Stade du Ray	17,415	10,947
Paris Saint-Germain	Paris	Parc des Princes	46,480	36,440
Rennes	Rennes	Stade de la Route de Lorient	31,127	25,515
Saint-Étienne	Saint-Étienne	Stade Geoffroy-Guichard	35,616	28,016
Sochaux	Montbéliard	Stade Auguste Bonal	20,025	15,189
Strasbourg	Strasbourg	Stade de la Meinau	29,230	19,135
Toulouse	Toulouse	Stade de Toulouse	35,472	18,634
Valenciennes	Valenciennes	Stade Nungesser	16,547	13,712

=== Personnel and sponsorships ===
Team	Manager	Kit manufacturer	Shirt sponsors (front)	Shirt sponsors (back)	Shirt sponsors (sleeve)	Shorts sponsors
Auxerre	(France) Jean Fernandez	Airness	Airness/Prest Oil, Invicta Group	Kindy Chaussettes	L'Yonne	None
Bordeaux	(France) Laurent Blanc	Puma	Kia	Cdiscount	Pichet Immobilier	Cdiscount
Caen	(France) Franck Dumas	Nike	GDE Recyclage (H)/Campagne de France (A), Celeos Groupe	Campagne de France (H)/GDE Recyclage (A)	Groupe Samro	Groupe Samro
Le Mans	(France) Rudi Garcia	Kappa	Fermiers de Loué (H)/Le Gaulois (A), Groupama, NTN	NTN	Système U	Groupama
Lens	(France) Jean-Pierre Papin	Nike	Atac (only in UEFA matches), Invicta Group	Atac	Région Nord-Pas-de-Calais	None
Lille	(France) Claude Puel	Airness	Partouche Casino	Partouche Casino	Région Nord-Pas-de-Calais	None
Lorient	(France) Christian Gourcuff	Erreà	La Trinitaine, Cap l'Orient Agglomération	Modicom	DCNS	None
Lyon	(France) Alain Perrin	Umbro	Novotel (H)/Ticket Restaurant (A), Apicil	Ticket Restaurant (H)/Novotel (A)	Ticket Restaurant (H)/Novotel (A)	Renault Trucks
Marseille	(Belgium) Eric Gerets	Adidas	Neuf	Groupama	Nasuba Express	Quick
Metz	(France) Yvon Pouliquen	Kappa	Nasuba Express, Moselle	Chaussea	Groupe DLSI	Bigben Interactive
Monaco	(Brazil) Ricardo Gomes	Puma	Fedcom, HSBC, Fight Aids Monaco	HSBC	HSBC	None
Nancy	(Uruguay) Pablo Correa	Baliston	Odalys Vacances, Geodis Calberson, Clairefontaine, Grand Nancy	Triangle Interim	Regina	Chaussea
Nice	(France) Frédéric Antonetti	Lotto	CitySport, Takara Multimédia, Communauté Nice Côte d'Azur	Botanica Groupe	Pizzorno Environnement	Ville de Nice
Paris Saint-Germain	(France) Paul Le Guen	Nike	Fly Emirates	Alain Afflelou	PSG TV	Groupe Sendin
Rennes	(France) Guy Lacombe	Puma	Samsic Propreté, Finanpart/Tatex Express,rennes.fr	Blot Immobilier	Association ELA	Groupe ROSE
Saint-Étienne	(France) Laurent Roussey	Adidas	Konica Minolta, Conseil général de la Loire en Rhône-Alpes	Groupama	Invicta Group	Fruité Entreprises
Sochaux	(France) Francis Gillot	Lotto	Mobil 1, Franche-Comté	Loxam	CanéO	Creditec
Strasbourg	(France) Jean-Marc Furlan	Hummel	Électricité de Strasbourg (H)/France Pare-Brise (A), Strasbourg en Mouvement	Groupama	None	Dernières Nouvelles d'Alsace
Toulouse	(France) Elie Baup	Lotto	Groupe IDEC, Monné-Decroix, ISS	Newrest	Creditec/Teambat	None
Valenciennes	(France) Antoine Kombouaré	Diadora	Toyota (H)/SITA (A)	SITA (H)/Toyota (A)	Région Nord-Pas-de-Calais	Partouche

== League table ==
Pos	Team	Pld	W	D	L	GF	GA	GD	Pts	Qualification or relegation
1	Lyon (C)	38	24	7	7	74	37	+37	79	Qualification to Champions League group stage
2	Bordeaux	38	22	9	7	65	38	+27	75	Qualification to Champions League group stage
3	Marseille	38	17	11	10	58	45	+13	62	Qualification to Champions League third qualifying round
4	Nancy	38	15	15	8	44	30	+14	60	Qualification to UEFA Cup first round
5	Saint-Étienne	38	16	10	12	47	34	+13	58	Qualification to UEFA Cup first round
6	Rennes	38	16	10	12	47	44	+3	58	Qualification to Intertoto Cup third round
7	Lille	38	13	18	7	45	32	+13	57	
8	Nice	38	13	16	9	35	30	+5	55	
9	Le Mans	38	14	11	13	46	49	−3	53	
10	Lorient	38	12	16	10	32	35	−3	52	
11	Caen	38	13	12	13	48	53	−5	51	
12	Monaco	38	13	8	17	40	48	−8	47	
13	Valenciennes	38	12	9	17	42	40	+2	45	
14	Sochaux	38	10	14	14	34	43	−9	44	
15	Auxerre	38	12	8	18	33	52	−19	44	
16	Paris Saint-Germain	38	10	13	15	37	45	−8	43	Qualification to UEFA Cup first round (Note: Paris Saint-Germain was qualified for the 2008–09 UEFA Cup as winners of the 2007–08 Coupe de la Ligue.)
17	Toulouse	38	9	15	14	36	42	−6	42	
18	Lens (R)	38	9	13	16	43	52	−9	40	Relegation to Ligue 2
19	Strasbourg (R)	38	9	8	21	34	55	−21	35	Relegation to Ligue 2
20	Metz (R)	38	5	9	24	28	64	−36	24 (Note: Metz were deducted one point by the Discipline Commission and ordered to play one match behind closed doors as a result of the racist insults inflicted by one of their fans on Valenciennes player Abdeslam Ouaddou. However, the decision of the point deduction was reversed on 27 March 2008.)	Relegation to Ligue 2

Source: Ligue 1
Rules for classification: 1) points; 2) goal difference; 3) number of goals scored.
(C) Champions; (R) Relegated

== Results ==
Home \ Away	AUX	BOR	CAE	MFC	RCL	LIL	LOR	OL	OM	MET	ASM	NAL	NIC	PSG	REN	STE	SOC	RCS	TFC	VAL
Auxerre		0–2	1–0	3–0	0–0	0–1	5–3	1–2	2–0	0–0	1–0	0–0	2–0	0–1	0–2	1–3	0–1	1–1	1–0	2–0
Bordeaux	4–1		2–1	1–2	1–0	0–0	2–2	1–3	2–2	3–0	2–1	2–1	0–0	3–0	3–0	1–0	2–0	3–0	4–3	2–1
Caen	0–0	5–0		3–2	1–4	1–0	0–0	1–0	1–2	1–2	4–1	0–0	1–0	3–0	2–2	1–3	2–2	2–0	2–1	1–0
Le Mans	3–0	1–2	1–1		3–2	1–1	0–0	1–0	0–0	1–0	1–0	2–1	2–0	0–2	1–1	3–2	0–2	0–1	1–1	2–0
Lens	2–0	2–2	1–1	1–3		1–2	1–1	3–0	3–3	1–1	0–0	1–0	0–0	0–0	1–2	3–2	3–2	2–2	1–1	0–0
Lille	0–2	1–1	5–0	3–1	2–1		0–0	0–1 (Note: Match was played at the Stade de France)	1–1	1–1	0–1	2–1	1–1	0–0	3–1	3–0	1–1	0–3	3–2	3–0
Lorient	1–1	1–0	0–0	0–0	1–0	1–1		2–1	1–2	2–0	2–1	0–0	0–0	1–0	0–1	1–1	2–1	1–0	1–0	1–3
Lyon	2–0	4–2	2–2	3–2	3–0	1–1	2–0		1–2	2–0	3–1	1–0	0–0	4–2	1–1	1–0	4–1	5–0	3–2	2–0
Marseille	2–1	1–2	6–1	1–0	1–0	1–3	0–0	3–1		3–1	2–0	2–2	0–2	2–1	0–0	2–0	0–1	4–3	1–2	3–1
Metz	0–1	0–1	2–1	4–3	1–2	1–2	1–2	1–5	1–2		1–4	0–0	1–2	0–0	1–1	0–1	1–2	1–2	0–2	2–1
Monaco	3–0	0–6	0–0	3–1	2–0	0–0	1–0	0–3	2–3	2–0		1–3	1–1	1–2	1–2	1–1	1–0	3–0	0–2	0–0
Nancy	4–1	1–0	1–0	1–1	2–1	2–0	2–0	1–1	1–1	2–1	2–0		2–1	1–0	2–3	2–0	1–1	3–0	1–0	0–0
Nice	1–2	1–1	3–1	0–0	1–0	0–0	1–2	0–0	0–2	3–1	0–2	1–0		2–1	1–1	3–0	0–0	1–0	1–1	1–0
Paris SG	3–1	0–2	0–1	0–0	3–0	1–1	1–3	2–3	1–1	3–0	1–1	0–0	2–3		1–3	1–1	0–0	1–0	1–2	1–1
Rennes	1–2	0–2	1–2	3–0	3–1	2–2	2–0	0–2	3–1	2–0	0–1	0–2	1–1	2–0		1–0	0–2	3–0	2–1	1–0
Saint-Étienne	0–0	0–0	3–0	4–1	2–0	0–0	1–0	1–1	1–0	2–0	4–0	4–0	0–0	0–1	2–0		1–0	2–0	0–0	3–1
Sochaux	1–1	0–1	1–1	1–3	0–2	1–1	1–1	1–2	2–1	0–0	0–3	1–1	1–0	1–2	0–0	1–1		0–0	0–1	1–0
Strasbourg	3–0	1–1	1–4	0–1	2–1	0–1	0–0	1–2	0–0	2–3	0–2	0–1	0–1	1–2	3–0	3–0	0–2		2–0	0–0
Toulouse	2–0	0–1	1–1	1–1	1–1	1–0	0–0	1–0	0–0	0–0	0–0	1–1	1–1	1–1	0–0	0–2	1–2	1–3		2–1
Valenciennes	3–0	3–1	3–0	1–2	1–2	0–0	3–0	1–2	2–1	0–0	1–0	1–1	0–2	0–0	3–0	2–0	3–1	2–0	3–1	

Source: Ligue 1
Legend: Blue = home team win; Yellow = draw; Red = away team win.

== Stats ==
=== Top goalscorers ===
Karim Benzema wins the Trophée du Meilleur Buteur.

Last updated 17 May 2008

Rank	Player	Club	Goals
1	(France) Karim Benzema	Lyon	20
2	(Senegal) Mamadou Niang	Marseille	18
3	(France) Bafétimbi Gomis	Saint-Étienne	16
3	(France) Djibril Cissé	Marseille	16
5	(Argentina) Fernando Cavenaghi	Bordeaux	15
6	(Ivory Coast) Bakari Koné	Nice	14
6	(Algeria) Rafik Saïfi	Lorient	14
8	(France) Steve Savidan	Valenciennes	13
8	(Brazil) Túlio de Melo	Le Mans	13
10	(France) Mickaël Pagis	Rennes	12

== Attacking Play table ==
Ligue 1 has introduced an Attacking Play Table since the start of the 2006–07 Ligue 1 season to encourage more goal-scoring in Ligue 1 and Ligue 2. The Ligue de Football Professionnel (LFP), with the help of the former France national team manager Michel Hidalgo, introduced the idea to reward those teams who score the most goals. Independent from the official league table, points are awarded as follows:

Outcome	Point(s)
Loss	0
Draw	1
Victory by one goal	2
Victory by multiple goals	3

The sum of 20 million Euros, taken from the LFP's new commercial ventures in 2006/2007 will be dedicated to this initiative. €16.7 million will go to Ligue 1. Prize money is distributed to the teams at the end of the season depending on where they finish in the table.

Last updated 17 May 2008

Pos	Club	Pld	W	W1	W2	D	L	GD	Pts
1	Lyon	38	24	9	15	7	7	+37	70
2	Bordeaux	38	22	12	10	9	7	+27	63
3	Saint-Étienne	38	16	4	12	10	12	+13	54
4	Nancy	38	15	7	8	15	8	+14	53
5	Marseille	38	17	10	8	10	10	+13	52
6	Rennes	38	16	7	9	10	12	+3	52
7	Lille	38	13	7	6	18	7	+13	50
8	Nice	38	13	9	4	16	9	+5	46
9	Le Mans	38	14	9	5	11	13	-3	44
10	Valenciennes	38	12	2	10	9	17	+2	43
11	Caen	38	13	8	5	12	13	-1	43
12	Monaco	38	13	4	9	8	17	-8	43
13	Lorient	38	12	10	2	16	10	-3	42
14	Auxerre	38	12	6	6	8	18	-19	38
15	Paris Saint-Germain	38	10	6	4	13	15	-8	37
16	Sochaux	38	10	7	3	14	14	-9	37
17	Toulouse	38	9	5	4	15	14	-6	36
18	Lens	38	9	5	4	13	16	-9	35
19	Strasbourg	38	9	3	6	8	21	-21	32
20	Metz	38	5	5	0	9	24	-36	19

Pld = Matches played; W = Matches won; W1 = Wins by one goal; W2 = Wins by more than one goal; D = Matches drawn; L = Matches lost; GD = Goal difference; Pts = Points

== Player of the Month ==
Month	Player	Club
August	(France) David Bellion	Bordeaux
September	(France) Jérôme Rothen	Paris Saint-Germain
October	(France) Jérôme Leroy	Rennes
November	(France) Sébastien Puygrenier	Nancy
December	(Senegal) Mamadou Niang	Marseille
January	(France) Karim Benzema	Lyon
February	(France) Steve Mandanda	Marseille
March	(Ivory Coast) Kader Keïta	Lyon
April	(France) Karim Benzema	Lyon

== Awards ==
=== Annual ===
Award	Winner	Club	Ref.
Player of the Season	(France) Karim Benzema	Olympique Lyonnais	
Young Player of the Season	(France) Hatem Ben Arfa	Olympique Lyonnais	
Goalkeeper of the Season	(France) Steve Mandanda	Olympique de Marseille	
Goal of the Season	(France) Mathieu Valbuena	Olympique de Marseille	
Manager of the Season	(France) Laurent Blanc	Bordeaux	

Team of the Season
Goalkeeper	(France) Steve Mandanda (Marseille)			
Defenders	(France) Laurent Bonnart (Marseille)	(France) Sébastien Puygrenier (Nancy)	(Brazil) Vitorino Hilton (Lens)	(Nigeria) Taye Taiwo (Marseille)
Midfielders	(France) Jérémy Toulalan (Lyon)	(France) Benoît Cheyrou (Marseille)	(France) Mathieu Valbuena (Marseille)	(Brazil) Wendel (Bordeaux)
Forwards	(Senegal) Mamadou Niang (Marseille)	(France) Karim Benzema (Lyon)		
