= Andriy Vlasyuk =

Ukrainian footballer

Personal information
- Full name: Andriy Oleksandrovych Vlasyuk
- Date of birth: 28 May 1992 (age 34)
- Place of birth: Korostyshiv, Ukraine
- Height: 1.79 m (5 ft 10 in)
- Position: Left back

Team information
- Current team: Zviahel
- Number: 18

Youth career
- 2005–2006: Polissya Zhytomyr
- 2006–2009: RVUFK Kyiv

Senior career*
Years	Team	Apps	(Gls)
2009	CSKA Kyiv	6	(2)
2009	Veres Rivne	4	(0)
2010	Lviv	0	(0)
2010	→ Lviv-2	7	(0)
2013	Korosten (amateurs)	2	(0)
2014	Lehion Zhytomyr (amateurs)	5	(1)
2014	Korosten (amateurs)	7	(1)
2015	Bukovyna Chernivtsi	8	(1)
2015–2018	Naftovyk-Ukrnafta Okhtyrka	62	(1)
2018	Hirnyk-Sport Horishni Plavni	11	(0)
2019–2023	Polissya Zhytomyr	59	(2)
2023–	Zviahel	8	(0)
- * Club domestic league appearances and goals as of 14 June 2024

Andriy Oleksandrovych Vlasyuk (Ukrainian: Андрій Олександрович Власюк; born 28 May 1992) is a Ukrainian professional footballer who plays as a left back for Ukrainian club Zviahel.
