= Radion Lisniak =

Ukrainian footballer (born 2002)

Personal information
- Full name: Radion Oleksandrovych Lisniak
- Date of birth: 15 January 2002 (age 24)
- Place of birth: Petrykivka, Ukraine
- Height: 1.78 m (5 ft 10 in)
- Position: Left winger

Team information
- Current team: Metalurh Zaporizhzhia
- Number: 29

Youth career
- 2015-2019: DYuSK Inter Dnipro
- 2019: Petrykivka

Senior career*
Years	Team	Apps	(Gls)
2019	Petrykivka	10	(2)
2020–2021	Inhulets Petrove	0	(0)
2022–2023	Kremin Kremenchuk	9	(0)
2023	→ Vast Mykolaiv (loan)	7	(0)
2023–2025	Inhulets Petrove	21	(0)
2025–	Metalurh Zaporizhzhia	16	(1)
- * Club domestic league appearances and goals as of 4 June 2026

Radion Lisniak (Ukrainian: Радіон Олександрович Лісняк; born 15 January 2002) is a Ukrainian professional footballer who plays as an left winger for Ukrainian club Metalurh Zaporizhzhia.

== Career ==
Lisniak began playing for amateur club FC Petrykivka in 2019. He then joined Inhulets Petrove where he played for its U-19 and U-21 teams. He scored 8 goals for them.

On 18 February 2022, Lisniak moved to Ukrainian First League club Kremin Kremenchuk. He signed a one-and-a-half-year contract and took the number 99 shirt. He made his debut for Kremin on 27 August replacing Andrii Hloba at 58 minutes in a 3:3 draw against Metalurh. Lisniak made 9 appearances for Kremin playing for 192 minutes. On 27 February 2023 he was loaned out until end of season to Vast.

On 2 March 2023 Vast Mykolaiv announced signing Lisniak on loan from Kremin. He took the number 7 shirt. He made his debut for Vast on 8 April in a 2:0 loss against Zviahel.

In summer 2025 he moved to Metalurh Zaporizhzhia. On 15 December 2025 he scored his first goal with the new club against Chernihiv at the Chernihiv Arena.

== Honours ==
Inhulets Petrove

- Ukrainian First League: 2023–24
