= Antoniy Emere =

Ukrainian footballer (born 2002)

Personal information
- Full name: Antoniy Daniel Chukvebuka Emere
- Date of birth: 27 May 2002 (age 24)
- Place of birth: Kharkiv, Ukraine
- Height: 1.77 m (5 ft 10 in)
- Position: Central midfielder

Team information
- Current team: UCSA Tarasivka
- Number: 11

Youth career
- 2013–2017: Metalist Kharkiv
- 2017: Dynamo Kyiv
- 2017–2019: Shakhtar Donetsk
- 2020–2021: Avanhard Kharkiv
- 2021: Metalist 1925 Kharkiv

Senior career*
Years	Team	Apps	(Gls)
2019–2020	Shakhtar Donetsk	0	(0)
2020	Avanhard Kharkiv	8	(2)
2021–2023	Metalist 1925 Kharkiv	0	(0)
2022	→ Hirnyk-Sport Horishni Plavni (loan)	6	(0)
2023	Zviahel	5	(0)
2023–2024	Chaika Petropavlivska Borshchahivka	25	(3)
2024–2025	Uzhhorod	34	(6)
2026–	UCSA Tarasivka	8	(4)

International career^{‡}
2017	Ukraine U15	2	(0)
2017–2018	Ukraine U16	7	(0)
- * Club domestic league appearances and goals as of 4 June 2026 ‡ National team caps and goals as of 26 September 2022

Antoniy Daniel Chukvebuka Emere (Ukrainian: Антоній Даніель Чуквебука Емере; born 27 May 2002) is a Ukrainian professional footballer who plays as a central midfielder for Ukrainian First League club UCSA Tarasivka.

After spending first half of 22-23 season in Hirnyk-Sport Horishni Plavni he joined Ukrainian Second League club Zviahel.
