= Andriy Solovyov =

Ukrainian footballer

Personal information
- Full name: Andriy Oleksandrovych Solovyov
- Date of birth: 23 August 2002 (age 24)
- Place of birth: Kyiv, Ukraine
- Height: 1.75 m (5 ft 9 in)
- Position: Central midfielder

Team information
- Current team: Dinaz Vyshhorod
- Number: 18

Youth career
- 2010: Peremozhets Kyiv
- 2015–2017: Mal Korosten
- 2017–2018: Zmina-Obolon Kyiv
- 2019: Kolos Kovalivka

Senior career*
Years	Team	Apps	(Gls)
2019–2023	Kolos Kovalivka	1	(0)
2021	→ Chaika Petropavlivska Borshchahivka (loan)	13	(1)
2023	→ Dinaz Vyshhorod (loan)	8	(0)
2023–	Dinaz Vyshhorod	31	(4)
- * Club domestic league appearances and goals as of 10 June 2025

Andriy Oleksandrovych Solovyov (Ukrainian: Андрій Олександрович Соловйов; born 23 August 2002) is a Ukrainian professional footballer who plays as a central midfielder for Dinaz Vyshhorod.

== Career ==
In February 2023 he moved on loan to Dinaz Vyshhorod.
