= Dmytro Yusov =

Ukrainian footballer

Personal information
- Full name: Dmytro Oleksandrovych Yusov
- Date of birth: 11 May 1993 (age 33)
- Place of birth: Melitopol, Ukraine
- Height: 1.88 m (6 ft 2 in)
- Position: Forward

Team information
- Current team: Torpedo-BelAZ Zhodino
- Number: 28

Youth career
- 2006–2010: Metalurh Zaporizhzhia

Senior career*
Years	Team	Apps	(Gls)
2010–2014	Metalurh-2 Zaporizhzhia	43	(1)
2013–2016	Metalurh Zaporizhzhia	46	(1)
2016	Granit Mikashevichi	10	(1)
2016	Dacia Chișinău	6	(0)
2017	Slutsk	20	(3)
2018–2020	Torpedo-BelAZ Zhodino	56	(13)
2020–2021	Isloch Minsk Raion	25	(9)
2021	BATE Borisov	12	(5)
2022–2023	Chornomorets Odesa	19	(4)
2023–2024	Metalist 1925 Kharkiv	27	(5)
2024–2025	Unirea Slobozia	21	(1)
2025–2026	Ulytau	9	(1)
2026	Atyrau	10	(0)
2026–	Torpedo-BelAZ Zhodino	0	(0)

International career
2014	Ukraine U21	6	(3)
- * Club domestic league appearances and goals as of 10 September 2026

Dmytro Oleksandrovych Yusov (Ukrainian: Дмитро Олександрович Юсов; born 11 May 1993) is a Ukrainian professional footballer who plays as a forward for Belarusian Premier League club Torpedo-BelAZ Zhodino.

== Career ==
Yusov is a product of the FC Metalurh Zaporizhzhia youth system. Made his debut for FC Metalurh entering as a second-half substitute against FC Vorskla Poltava on 4 May 2013 in Ukrainian Premier League.

== Honours ==
Isloch Minsk Raion

- Belarusian Cup runner-up: 2020–21
