= Andriy Chyruk =

Ukrainian footballer (born 2001)

Personal information
- Full name: Andriy Yuriyovych Chyruk
- Date of birth: 8 January 2001 (age 25)
- Place of birth: Rivne, Ukraine
- Height: 1.84 m (6 ft 0 in)
- Position: Centre-forward

Team information
- Current team: Metalist 1925 Kharkiv
- Number: 79

Youth career
- 2011–2013: Veres Rivne
- 2013–2017: Metalist Kharkiv
- 2017: Dynamo Kyiv
- 2017–2018: Shakhtar Donetsk

Senior career*
Years	Team	Apps	(Gls)
2018–2021	Shakhtar Donetsk	0	(0)
2022–	Metalist 1925 Kharkiv	31	(1)

International career^{‡}
2018	Ukraine U17	1	(0)
2019	Ukraine U18	2	(0)
- * Club domestic league appearances and goals as of 15 March 2024 ‡ National team caps and goals as of 10 September 2022

Andriy Yuriyovych Chyruk (Ukrainian: Андрій Юрійович Чирук; born 8 January 2001) is a Ukrainian professional footballer who plays as a centre-forward for Metalist 1925 Kharkiv.

== Career ==
=== Early years ===
Born in Rivne, Chyruk began his career at the Veres Rivne academy before jumping around between the Metalist Kharkiv, Dynamo Kyiv and Shakhtar Donetsk academy systems.

=== Metalist 1925 Kharkiv ===
In August 2022 he signed a one-year deal with Ukrainian Premier League side Metalist 1925 Kharkiv. On 3 September, he made his debut as a second half-time substitute at home against Vorskla Poltava.
