= Griffin Sabatini =

Swiss football player (born 1998)

Personal information
- Full name: Griffin Riley Sabatini
- Date of birth: 23 September 1998 (age 28)
- Place of birth: Harare, Zimbabwe
- Height: 1.76 m (5 ft 9 in)
- Position: Midfielder

Youth career
- Lancy
- Meyrin
- FC Vernier
- 2018: Wohlen

College career
Years	Team	Apps	(Gls)
2017–2018	Northeastern Huskies	16	(0)

Senior career*
Years	Team	Apps	(Gls)
2019–2021	Dnipro-1	1	(0)
2020–2021	→ Airdrieonians (loan)	12	(0)
2021–2022	Gretna 2008		
2022–2023	Berwick Rangers	13	(0)
2023	East Stirlingshire	10	(0)
2023–2024	Tweedmouth Rangers		
- * Club domestic league appearances and goals as of 20 May 2023

Griffin Riley Sabatini (born 23 September 1998) is a Swiss footballer who plays as a midfielder.

== Career ==
Sabatini was born in Zimbabwe but grew up in Switzerland. He attended the International School of Geneva. In 2017, he enrolled at Northeastern University, where he played for the university's soccer team.

In August 2019, he signed his first professional contract with Ukrainian Premier League club Dnipro-1 on a one-year deal. On 19 July 2020, Sabatini made his professional debut as a substitute in a 3–0 win over Vorskla Poltava.

On 3 August 2020, Sabatini joined Scottish League One club Airdrieonians on a season-long loan deal.

In August 2022, Sabatini joined Lowland Football League club Berwick Rangers after a spell with Gretna 2008.

In January 2023, Sabatini joined Lowland Football League club East Stirlingshire on a deal until the end of the season.

During the 2023–24 season, Sabatini featured for East of Scotland Football League side Tweedmouth Rangers.
