= Ihor Huk (footballer) =

Ukrainian footballer

Personal information
- Full name: Ihor Olehovych Huk
- Date of birth: 11 June 2002 (age 24)
- Place of birth: Chervonohrad, Ukraine
- Height: 1.81 m (5 ft 11 1/2 in)
- Position: Defender

Team information
- Current team: Probiy Horodenka
- Number: 16

Youth career
- 2013–2014: Hirnyk Sosnivka
- 2014–2017: BRW-VIK Volodymyr-Volynskyi
- 2017–2019: Dynamo Kyiv

Senior career*
Years	Team	Apps	(Gls)
2019–2020	Dynamo Kyiv	0	(0)
2020–2023	Veres Rivne	1	(0)
2022	→ Zviahel (loan)	10	(0)
2023–2024	Zviahel	28	(0)
2024–	Probiy Horodenka	33	(2)
- * Club domestic league appearances and goals as of 4 June 2026

Ihor Huk (Ukrainian: Ігор Олегович Гук; born 11 June 2002) is a Ukrainian professional footballer who plays as a defender for Probiy Horodenka.

== Career ==
Huk is a product of the Hirnyk Sosnivka, BRW-VIK Volodymyr-Volynskyi and Dynamo Kyiv youth academy systems.

In September 2020, he signed a three-year contract with Veres Rivne in the Ukrainian First League, where he made his debut against FC Hirnyk-Sport Horishni Plavni on 12 June 2021.
