= Oleksandr Litvinov =

Ukrainian footballer (born 2002)

Personal information
- Full name: Oleksandr Mykolayovych Litvinov
- Date of birth: 27 March 2002 (age 24)
- Place of birth: Kyiv, Ukraine
- Height: 1.81 m (5 ft 11 in)
- Position: Right-back

Team information
- Current team: Dinaz Vyshhorod
- Number: 6

Youth career
- 2015–2017: Mal Korosten
- 2017–2019: Zmina-Obolon Kyiv
- 2019–2020: DYuSSh-26 Kyiv

Senior career*
Years	Team	Apps	(Gls)
2020–2023	Kolos Kovalivka	0	(0)
2022–2023	→ Dinaz Vyshhorod (loan)	20	(0)
2023–	Dinaz Vyshhorod	34	(0)
- * Club domestic league appearances and goals as of 10 June 2025

Oleksandr Mykolayovych Litvinov (Ukrainian: Олександр Миколайович Літвінов; born 27 March 2002) is a Ukrainian professional footballer who plays as a right-back for Dinaz Vyshhorod.
