= Maksym Tyapkin =

Ukrainian footballer

Personal information
- Full name: Maksym Volodymyrovych Tyapkin
- Date of birth: 5 January 2001 (age 25)
- Place of birth: Pushkarivka, Dnipropetrovsk Oblast, Ukraine
- Height: 1.77 m (5 ft 10 in)
- Position: Right winger

Team information
- Current team: Hirnyk-Sport Horishni Plavni
- Number: 5

Youth career
- 2014–2017: Inter Dnipro
- 2017–2018: Dnipro

Senior career*
Years	Team	Apps	(Gls)
2018–2019	Dnipro	13	(2)
2019–2022	Dnipro-1	0	(0)
2021–2022	→ Nikopol (loan)	20	(3)
2022	LNZ Cherkasy	6	(0)
2023	Nyva Ternopil	7	(0)
2023	Ahrobiznes Volochysk	10	(0)
2024	FA Ternopil	10	(0)
2024–	Hirnyk-Sport Horishni Plavni	15	(2)
- * Club domestic league appearances and goals as of 5 May 2025

Maksym Volodymyrovych Tyapkin (Ukrainian: Максим Володимирович Тяпкін; born 5 January 2001) is a Ukrainian professional footballer who plays as a right winger for Ukrainian Second League club Hirnyk-Sport Horishni Plavni.
