= Oleksiy Khyzhnyak =

Ukrainian footballer

Personal information
- Full name: Oleksiy Serhiyovych Khyzhnyak
- Date of birth: 9 January 2001 (age 25)
- Place of birth: Dnipropetrovsk, Ukraine
- Height: 1.88 m (6 ft 2 in)
- Position: Centre-back

Youth career
- 2014: DYuSSh-2 Dnipro
- 2014–2018: Dnipro

Senior career*
Years	Team	Apps	(Gls)
2017–2019	Dnipro	16	(0)
2019–2022	Dnipro-1	0	(0)
2021–2022	→ Nikopol (loan)	3	(0)

International career
2016–2017	Ukraine U17	6	(0)
- * Club domestic league appearances and goals as of 20 July 2022

Oleksiy Serhiyovych Khyzhnyak (Ukrainian: Олексій Сергійович Хижняк; born 9 January 2001) is a Ukrainian professional footballer who plays as a centre-back.
