= Serhiy Sukhanov =

Ukrainian footballer

Personal information
- Full name: Serhiy Volodymyrovych Sukhanov
- Date of birth: 6 April 1995 (age 31)
- Place of birth: Okhtyrka, Ukraine
- Height: 1.83 m (6 ft 0 in)
- Position: Right back

Team information
- Current team: Obolon Kyiv
- Number: 55

Youth career
- 2006–2008: Darnytsya-KSDYuShOR Kyiv
- 2008–2009: Dynamo Kyiv
- 2009: Darnytsya-KSDYuShOR Kyiv
- 2009–2012: Knyazha Shchaslyve

Senior career*
Years	Team	Apps	(Gls)
2013–2018	Naftovyk-Ukrnafta Okhtyrka	31	(3)
2013–2016	→ Naftovyk-Ukrnafta-2 Okhtyrka	37	(11)
2018–2019	Polissya Zhytomyr	19	(3)
2019–2020	Hirnyk-Sport Horishni Plavni	40	(3)
2021–2022	Obolon Kyiv	27	(2)
2022–2023	Chornomorets Odesa	1	(0)
2023–	Obolon Kyiv	83	(8)
- * Club domestic league appearances and goals as of 3 June 2026

Serhiy Volodymyrovych Sukhanov (Ukrainian: Сергій Володимирович Суханов; born 6 April 1995) is a Ukrainian professional footballer who plays as a right back for Obolon Kyiv.

== Career ==
In February 2023 he moved to Obolon Kyiv.
