= Maksym Kovalenko (footballer) =

Ukrainian footballer (born 2002)

Personal information
- Full name: Maksym Oleksandrovych Kovalenko
- Date of birth: 30 May 2002 (age 24)
- Place of birth: Kharkiv, Ukraine
- Height: 1.92 m (6 ft 4 in)
- Position: Goalkeeper

Team information
- Current team: Probiy Horodenka (on loan from Metalist 1925 Kharkiv)
- Number: 25

Youth career
- 2008–2018: Metalist Kharkiv
- 2018–2019: Metalist 1925 Kharkiv
- 2019: Avanhard Kharkiv

Senior career*
Years	Team	Apps	(Gls)
2018	Metalist Yunior	2	(0)
2020	Avanhard Kharkiv	8	(0)
2020–	Metalist 1925 Kharkiv	4	(0)
2022	→ Hirnyk-Sport Horishni Plavni (loan)	11	(0)
2023	→ Nyva Vinnytsia (loan)	7	(0)
2023–2024	→ Zviahel (loan)	8	(0)
2025–	→ Probiy Horodenka (loan)	25	(0)
- * Club domestic league appearances and goals as of 4 June 2026

Maksym Oleksandrovych Kovalenko (Ukrainian: Максим Олександрович Коваленко; born 30 May 2002) is a Ukrainian professional footballer who plays as a goalkeeper for Probiy Horodenka, on loan from Ukrainian Premier League club Metalist 1925 Kharkiv.

== Career ==
In summer 2022 Kovalenko moved on loan to Hirnyk-Sport Horishni Plavni where he played 11 matches. In March 2023 he moved on loan to Nyva Vinnytsia in the Ukrainian Second League.
