= Danylo Sydorenko (footballer, born 2003) =

Ukrainian footballer

Personal information
- Full name: Danylo Pavlovych Sydorenko
- Date of birth: 13 January 2003 (age 23)
- Place of birth: Dnipropetrovsk Oblast, Ukraine
- Height: 1.84 m (6 ft 0 in)
- Position: Centre-back

Team information
- Current team: UCSA Tarasivka
- Number: 3

Youth career
- 2016–2019: Inter Dnipro
- 2019–2020: Shakhtar Donetsk

Senior career*
Years	Team	Apps	(Gls)
2020–2021	Inhulets Petrove	0	(0)
2021	Kolos Kovalivka	0	(0)
2021–2023	Kremin Kremenchuk	7	(0)
2022	→ Tarnovia Tarnów (loan)	3	(0)
2023	→ Hirnyk-Sport Horishni Plavni (loan)	3	(0)
2023–2024	Lokomotyv Kyiv	25	(0)
2025	Kremin Kremenchuk	7	(1)
2025–26	UCSA Tarasivka	17	(0)
2026 -	FC Feniks-Mariupol	2	(0)
- * Club domestic league appearances and goals as of 4 June 2026

Danylo Pavlovych Sydorenko (Ukrainian: Данило Павлович Сидоренко; born 13 January 2003) is a Ukrainian professional footballer who plays as a centre-back for Ukrainian club UCSA Tarasivka.

== Career ==
In February 2023 he moved on loan to Horishni Plavni.
