= Wendel (footballer, born 2001) =

Brazilian footballer

Personal information
- Full name: Wendel da Silva Ramos
- Date of birth: 1 April 2001 (age 25)
- Place of birth: Limeira, Brazil
- Height: 1.78 m (5 ft 10 in)
- Position: Central midfielder

Team information
- Current team: Chaika Petropavlivska Borshchahivka
- Number: 27

Youth career
- –2017: Inter de Limeira
- 2018–2020: XV de Piracicaba

Senior career*
Years	Team	Apps	(Gls)
2020	XV de Piracicaba	0	(0)
2021–2022	Vovchansk	15	(4)
2022–	Metalist 1925 Kharkiv	3	(0)
- * Club domestic league appearances and goals as of 25 September 2022

Wendel da Silva Ramos (born 1 April 2001), known as Wendel, is a Brazilian professional footballer who plays as a central midfielder for Ukrainian Second League club Chaika Petropavlivska Borshchahivka.
