= Valeriy Yurchuk =

Ukrainian footballer

Personal information
- Full name: Valeriy Volodymyrovych Yurchuk
- Date of birth: 12 April 1990 (age 36)
- Place of birth: Dnipropetrovsk, Ukrainian SSR
- Height: 1.84 m (6 ft 0 in)
- Position: Goalkeeper

Team information
- Current team: Podillya Khmelnytskyi
- Number: 33

Youth career
- 2003–2007: Dnipro Dnipropetrovsk

Senior career*
Years	Team	Apps	(Gls)
2007–2012	Dnipro Dnipropetrovsk	0	(0)
2009	→ Kryvbas Kryvyi Rih (loan)	0	(0)
2010–2012	→ Dnipro-2 Dnipropetrovsk	42	(0)
2012	Dynamo Khmelnytskyi	11	(0)
2013	Slavutych Cherkasy	10	(0)
2013–2015	Metalurh Zaporizhzhia	1	(0)
2016	Veres Rivne	0	(0)
2016–2017	Naftovyk-Ukrnafta Okhtyrka	19	(0)
2017–2024	Dnipro-1	72	(0)
2023	→ Lviv (loan)	2	(0)
2025–	Podillya Khmelnytskyi	22	(0)
- * Club domestic league appearances and goals as of 4 June 2026

Valeriy Volodymyrovych Yurchuk (Ukrainian: Валерій Володимирович Юрчук; born 12 April 1990) is a Ukrainian professional footballer who plays as a goalkeeper for Podillya Khmelnytskyi.

== Career ==
Yurchuk is a product of the FC Dnipro Youth Sportive School System. His first trainers were Oleksiy Chystyakov and Serhiy Maksymych.

He made his debut for Metalurh Zaporizhzhia in the Ukrainian Premier League in a match against FC Zorya Luhansk on 24 May 2015.
