= Vladyslav Shynkarenko =

Ukrainian footballer

Personal information
- Full name: Vladyslav Viktorovych Shynkarenko
- Date of birth: 27 January 2001 (age 25)
- Place of birth: Dnipropetrovsk, Ukraine
- Height: 1.81 m (5 ft 11 in)
- Position: Midfielder

Team information
- Current team: Hirnyk-Sport
- Number: 11

Youth career
- 2009–2014: Parus Dnipropetrovsk
- 2014–2018: Dnipro

Senior career*
Years	Team	Apps	(Gls)
2018–2019	Dnipro (amateurs)	20	(2)
2019–2022	Dnipro-1	1	(0)
2021	→ Nikopol (loan)	10	(0)
2022–	Hirnyk-Sport	17	(1)
- * Club domestic league appearances and goals as of 14 June 2023

Vladyslav Viktorovych Shynkarenko (Ukrainian: Владислав Вікторович Шинкаренко; born 27 January 2001) is a professional Ukrainian football midfielder who plays for Hirnyk-Sport.

== Career ==
Shynkarenko is a product of the Parus and the Dnipro youth sportive schools in his native city and in July 2019 he signed a contract with Ukrainian side SC Dnipro-1 and played for its in the Ukrainian Premier League Reserves and Under 19 Championship.

In December 2020 he was promoted to the main squad to play in the Ukrainian Premier League. Shynkarenko made his debut in the Ukrainian Premier League for SC Dnipro-1 as a second-half substituted player on 6 December 2020, playing in a losing away match against FC Zorya Luhansk.
