= Vadym Solohub =

Ukrainian footballer (born 2004)

Personal information
- Full name: Vadym Mykolayovych Solohub
- Date of birth: 11 March 2004 (age 22)
- Place of birth: Hnivan, Ukraine
- Height: 1.72 m (5 ft 8 in)
- Position: Right winger

Team information
- Current team: Wybrzeże Rewalskie Rewal
- Number: 97

Youth career
- 2016–2018: Premyer-Nyva Vinnytsia
- 2018–2021: UFK-Karpaty Lviv

Senior career*
Years	Team	Apps	(Gls)
2021–2022	Rukh Lviv	0	(0)
2022	→ Hirnyk-Sport Horishni Plavni (loan)	9	(0)
2023	Metalist 1925 Kharkiv	1	(0)
2024–2025	Tarpan Mrocza	16	(5)
2025–2026	Elana Toruń	10	(1)
2026–	Wybrzeże Rewalskie Rewal	13	(3)

International career
2020	Ukraine U16	2	(0)
- * Club domestic league appearances and goals as of 17:53, 5 June 2026 (UTC)

Vadym Mykolayovych Solohub (Ukrainian: Вадим Миколайович Сологуб; born 11 March 2004) is a Ukrainian professional footballer who plays as a right winger for Polish club Wybrzeże Rewalskie Rewal.
