= Oleksandr Byelyayev =

Ukrainian footballer

Personal information
- Full name: Oleksandr Andriyovych Byelyayev
- Date of birth: 4 October 1999 (age 27)
- Place of birth: Dnipropetrovsk, Ukraine
- Height: 1.75 m (5 ft 9 in)
- Position: Central midfielder

Team information
- Current team: Kudrivka
- Number: 7

Youth career
- 2013–2016: Dnipro Dnipropetrovsk

Senior career*
Years	Team	Apps	(Gls)
2016–2017	Dnipro	0	(0)
2017–2022	Dnipro-1	29	(1)
2018	→ Zirka Kropyvnytskyi (loan)	10	(0)
2020	→ Saburtalo Tbilisi (loan)	6	(0)
2021	→ VPK-Ahro Shevchenkivka (loan)	14	(2)
2021–2022	→ Gençlerbirliği (loan)	15	(0)
2022–2023	Gençlerbirliği	14	(0)
2023	→ Lviv (loan)	14	(1)
2023–2025	Oleksandriya	33	(2)
2025–	Kudrivka	10	(0)

International career^{‡}
2015	Ukraine U17	1	(0)
2017–2018	Ukraine U19	9	(0)
2018–2019	Ukraine U20	3	(0)
Medal record
Men's football
Representing Ukraine
UEFA European Under-19 Championship
Bronze medal – third place	2018 Finland
- * Club domestic league appearances and goals as of 24 May 2026 ‡ National team caps and goals as of 4 August 2020

Oleksandr Andriyovych Byelyayev (Ukrainian: Олександр Андрійович Бєляєв; born 4 October 1999) is a Ukrainian professional footballer who plays as a central midfielder for Kudrivka.

== Career ==
Byelyayev is a product of the FC Dnipro Youth system.
