= PFC Zviahel =

FC Zviahel
- Full name: Football Club Zviahel
- Founded: 1993; 33 years ago 2016; 10 years ago (refounded)
- Dissolved: 2002; 24 years ago 2024; 2 years ago
- Ground: Avanhard Stadium, Zviahel
- Capacity: 3,000
- Chairman: Stepan Nusbaum
- 2023–24: 3rd of 15 (promoted via play-offs)

Football Club Zviahel (Ukrainian: Футбольний клуб Звягель) was a Ukrainian football team from Zviahel. On 16 November 2022, the Ukrainian parliament has approved returning of the city's historical name and the club's name became coincidental with the city's name.

In 2022 the club debuted at professional level becoming the first football club from Zviahel to do so. In 2024 rumors appeared that club may fold following the 2023–24 season and appearance of Polissya-2. On 26 May 2024, "Ukraiyinskyi football" online media was inquiring about the future of Zviahel and was assured that the club will continue to play.

== History ==
Created in 1993 as Zviahel-93, until 2002 the club competed exclusively in regional competitions of Zhytomyr Oblast. The club managed to become a winner of the regional competitions in 1993 and runner-up in 1994. In 1996 and 1997 it won cup competitions of Zhytomyr Oblast and participated in the Ukrainian Amateur Cup where it yielded to FC Enerhetyk Burshtyn. In 1997 the club temporarily competed under the name of Lider. In 2002 as Fortuna Novohrad-Volynskyi the club folded due to lack of financing.

On initiative of the local sports school staff and students, in March 2016 the club was revived and received support from the city authorities. In 2019 and 2020 Zvyahel again managed to win regional league competitions and participated in national amateur cup competitions earning its first victories. For the first time in 2021 the club joined the national amateur league competitions which due to the war were interrupted.

== Players ==
=== Last squad ===
As of 10 July 2024

Note: Flags indicate national team as defined under FIFA eligibility rules; some limited exceptions apply. Players may hold more than one non-FIFA nationality.

No.	Pos.	Nation	Player
1	GK	UKR	Anton Yashkov
5	DF	UKR	Andriy Nesterov
7	MF	UKR	Bohdan Orynchak
9	FW	UKR	Serhiy Kyslenko
10	MF	UKR	Danylo Volynets
11	MF	UKR	Andriy Fesenko
16	DF	UKR	Nazar Havrylyuk
18	DF	UKR	Andriy Vlasyuk
19	DF	UKR	Ihor Huk
20	FW	UKR	Maksym Andrushchenko
21	MF	UKR	Andriy Nykytyuk

No.	Pos.	Nation	Player
22	MF	UKR	Nikita Petruk (on loan from Polissya Zhytomyr)
23	FW	UKR	Maksym Maytak
24	DF	UKR	Valeriy Skydan
33	MF	UKR	Bohdan Panchyshyn
59	MF	UKR	Vadym Luchka
71	GK	UKR	Ivan Martynov
77	MF	UKR	Dmytro Berezka
78	FW	UKR	Illya Cherednychenko
97	MF	UKR	Andriy Bliznichenko
—	MF	UKR	Vasyl Hrytsuk (on loan from Polissya Zhytomyr)
—	FW	UKR	Denis Yanakov (on loan from Polissya Zhytomyr)

== League and cup history ==
Season	Div.	Pos.	Pl.	W	D	L	GS	GA	P	Domestic Cup	Europe	Notes
2021–22	4th Group 2	6_{/10}	9	4	0	5	8	15	12			Admitted to Second League
2022–23	3rd	5_{/10}	18	9	5	4	30	17	32			
2023–24	3rd	3_{/15}	26	19	4	3	63	17	61			won promotion playoffs / withdrew

== Head coaches ==
- 1996–1997 Andriy Los
- 2017–2023 Ruslan Skydan
- 2023 Yuriy Maksymov
- 2023–2024 Serhiy Shyshchenko
- 2024 Mykola Hibalyuk (caretaker)
- 2024 Yuriy Virt

== See also ==
- FC Zvyahel-750 Novohrad-Volynskyi
