= 2024–25 FC Polissya Zhytomyr season =

Polissya Zhytomyr
2024–25 season
- Chairman: Hennadiy Butkevych
- Head coach: Imad Ashur (until 12 May 2025); Oleksandr Maksymov (caretaker, from 12 May 2025)
- Stadium: Tsentralnyi Stadion
- Ukrainian Premier League: 4th
- Ukrainian Cup: Semi-finals
- UEFA Conference League: Second qualifying round
- Top goalscorer: League: Oleksiy Hutsulyak (11); All: Oleksiy Hutsulyak (12)
Home colours	Away colours	Third colours

The 2024–25 season was FC Polissya Zhytomyr's 57th season in existence and the club's 2nd consecutive season in the top flight of Ukrainian football. In addition to the domestic league, Polissya Zhytomyr participated in that season's editions of the Ukrainian Cup and the UEFA Conference League. The season covers the period from 1 July 2024 to 30 June 2025.

== Players ==
=== First team squad ===
Squad at the end of season

Note: Flags indicate national team as defined under FIFA eligibility rules; some limited exceptions apply. Players may hold more than one non-FIFA nationality.

No.	Pos.	Nation	Player
1	GK	UKR	Oleh Kudryk
2	DF	ALB	Andi Hadroj
4	DF	CRO	Matej Matić
5	DF	UKR	Eduard Sarapiy
7	FW	UKR	Oleksandr Nazarenko
8	MF	UKR	Ruslan Babenko
9	FW	URU	Facundo Batista
10	MF	ISR	Tomer Yosefi
11	MF	UKR	Oleksiy Hutsulyak
13	DF	BRA	Lucas Taylor
14	MF	ISR	Ofek Biton
15	DF	UKR	Bohdan Mykhaylichenko
18	MF	UKR	Oleksandr Andriyevskyi
19	MF	CGO	Borel Tomandzoto
23	GK	UKR	Yevhen Volynets

No.	Pos.	Nation	Player
27	FW	BIH	Admir Bristrić (on loan from Olimpija Ljubljana)
30	MF	UKR	Bohdan Lyednyev
31	DF	GEO	Giorgi Maisuradze
34	DF	BRA	João Vialle
37	MF	BRA	Talles Costa
40	FW	POR	André Gonçalves
44	DF	UKR	Serhiy Chobotenko (captain)
55	DF	UKR	Borys Krushynskyi
58	MF	UKR	Serhiy Korniychuk
60	MF	UKR	Maksym Melnychenko
70	FW	CGO	Jerry Yoka
73	DF	UKR	Danylo Beskorovaynyi
90	FW	BRA	Cauã Paixão (on loan from Vasco da Gama)
99	GK	UKR	Viktor Ulihanets

=== Left during the season ===
Note: Flags indicate national team as defined under FIFA eligibility rules; some limited exceptions apply. Players may hold more than one non-FIFA nationality.

No.	Pos.	Nation	Player
9	FW	VEN	Luifer Hernández (loan to Vinotinto)
10	FW	CGO	Béni Makouana (loan to LNZ Cherkasy)
16	FW	MKD	Dimitar Trajkov (loan to Dugopolje)
19	FW	UKR	Dmytro Shastal (to Livyi Bereh Kyiv)
29	DF	UKR	Artem Smolyakov (to Los Angeles FC)

No.	Pos.	Nation	Player
33	GK	UKR	Artem Pospyelov (released)
77	MF	UKR	Bohdan Kushnirenko (to LNZ Cherkasy)
80	FW	BRA	Wendell (loan to Veres Rivne)
95	MF	AZE	Emil Mustafayev (loan to Chornomorets Odesa)

== Friendlies ==
3 July 2024 Friendly	Polissya Zhytomyr (Ukraine)	2–1	(Ukraine) Nyva Buzova
17:30

6 July 2024 Friendly	Polissya Zhytomyr (Ukraine)	1–0	(Ukraine) LNZ Cherkasy	Berezyna, Zhytomyr Raion
16:00				Stadium: Polissya Zhytomyr Training Base

10 July 2024 Friendly	Veres Rivne (Ukraine)	1–4	(Ukraine) Polissya Zhytomyr
16:00
Note: 4 x 30 minutes

17 July 2024 Friendly	Polissya Zhytomyr (Ukraine)	2–2	(Ukraine) Epitsentr Kamianets-Podilskyi
16:30

12 October 2024 Friendly	Polissya Zhytomyr (Ukraine)	0–0	(Ukraine) Veres Rivne	Berezyna, Zhytomyr Raion
12:30		Report		Stadium: Polissya Zhytomyr Training Base

== Competitions ==
=== Overall record ===
Competition	First match	Last match	Starting round	Final position	Record							
Competition	First match	Last match	Starting round	Final position	Pld	W	D	L	GF	GA	GD	Win %
Ukrainian Premier League	11 August 2024	25 May 2025	Matchday 1	4th	30	12	12	6	38	28	+10	40.00
Ukrainian Cup	30 October 2024	23 April 2025	Round of 16	Semi-finals	3	2	0	1	3	2	+1	66.67
UEFA Conference League	25 July 2024	1 August 2024	Second qualifying round	Second qualifying round	2	0	0	2	1	4	−3	0.00
Total					35	14	12	9	42	34	+8	40.00

Source: Soccerway

=== Ukrainian Premier League ===
==== League table ====
Pos	Team	Pld	W	D	L	GF	GA	GD	Pts	Qualification or relegation
2	Oleksandriya	30	20	7	3	46	22	+24	67	Qualification for the Conference League second qualifying round
3	Shakhtar Donetsk	30	18	8	4	69	26	+43	62	Qualification for the Europa League first qualifying round (Note: Shakhtar Donetsk qualified for the Europa League first qualifying round by winning the 2024–25 Ukrainian Cup; the second Conference League spot was passed to the fourth-placed team.)
4	Polissya Zhytomyr	30	12	12	6	38	28	+10	48	Qualification for the Conference League second qualifying round
5	Kryvbas Kryvyi Rih	30	13	8	9	34	26	+8	47	
6	Karpaty Lviv	30	13	7	10	42	36	+6	46	

Source: upl.ua
Rules for classification: 1) Points; 2) Head-to-head points; 3) Head-to-head goal difference; 4) Head-to-head goals scored; 5) Goal difference; 6) Goals scored; 7) Draw or "Golden match" if two teams tied for title (Article 22, paragraph 3).
Notes:

Teams that placed 13th and 14th in the 2024–25 Ukrainian Premier League played two-leg play-off with the third and fourth teams of the 2024–25 Ukrainian First League. As a result, both the Ukrainian First League teams (Metalist 1925 and Kudrivka) received promotion after beating the Ukrainian Premier League teams (Vorskla and Livyi Bereh), which in turn were relegated. Due to the Russian 2025 summer escalation and the Russian ballistic missile attack warnings, on 1 June 2025, both matches were suspended but later renewed.

Team 1	Agg.	Team 2	1st leg	2nd leg
Kudrivka	2–2 (4–3 p)	Vorskla Poltava	1–2	1–0
Livyi Bereh Kyiv	0–2	Metalist 1925 Kharkiv	0–1	0–1

=== First Semi-final ===
29 May 2025	Kudrivka	1–2	Vorskla Poltava	Kyiv
15:30	Kozak 83'	Report	Ndukve 23'; Pavlyuk 39'	Stadium: Obolon Arena; Attendance: 1,100; Referee: Dmytro Panchyshyn (Kharkiv)

1 June 2025	Vorskla Poltava	0–1 (3–4 p)	Kudrivka	Poltava
13:00		Report	Lytovchenko 9'	Stadium: Vorskla; Attendance: 2,204; Referee: Mykola Balakin (Kyiv oblast)
	Penalties
	Ndukve (penalty scored); Malysh (penalty scored); Iyede (penalty missed); Kane (penalty missed); Salabay (penalty scored); Sklyar (penalty missed)		(penalty scored) Tuzenko; (penalty missed) Storchous; (penalty scored) Shershen; (penalty scored) Potimkov; (penalty missed) Serdyuk; (penalty scored) Liehostayev

2–2 on aggregate; Kudrivka won 4–3 on penalties and promotion to Premier League. While, Vorskla lost 3–4 on penalties and relegation to First League

=== Second Semi-final ===
29 May 2025	Livyi Bereh Kyiv	0–1	Metalist 1925 Kharkiv	Hnidyn, Kyiv Oblast
18:00		Report	Moura 38'	Stadium: Arena Livyi Bereh; Attendance: 1,167; Referee: Viktor Kopiyevskyi (Kropyvnytskyi)

1 June 2025	Metalist 1925 Kharkiv	1–0	Livyi Bereh Kyiv	Hnidyn, Kyiv Oblast
15:30	Kalitvintsev 90'	Report		Stadium: Arena Livyi Bereh; Attendance: 1,800; Referee: Vitaliy Romanov (Dnipro)

Metalist 1925 Kharkiv won 2–0 on aggregate and promotion to Premier League. While, Livyi Bereh Kyiv lost 0–2 on aggregate and relegation to First League.

==== Results summary ====
Overall								Home						Away					
Pld	W	D	L	GF	GA	GD	Pts	W	D	L	GF	GA	GD	W	D	L	GF	GA	GD
30	12	12	6	38	28	+10	48	5	8	2	19	12	+7	7	4	4	19	16	+3

Last updated: 28 February 2025.
Source: soccerway

==== Matches ====
The match schedule was released on 28 June 2024.

11 August 2024 2	Shakhtar Donetsk	0–1	Polissya Zhytomyr	Kyiv
18:00 EET	Kevin (yellow card) 90+12'	Report	Chobotenko 35'; Hutsulyak (yellow card) 65'; Mykhaylichenko (yellow card) 72'; Volynets (yellow card) 90+12'	Stadium: Arena Livyi Bereh; Attendance: 1,185; Referee: Oleksandr Shandor

17 August 2024 3	Polissya Zhytomyr	1–1	Inhulets Petrove	Zhytomyr
15:30 EET	Nazarenko 45+2'; João Vialle (yellow card) 74'	Report	Lisnyak (yellow card) 39'; Vilivald 41'	Stadium: Tsentralnyi Stadion; Attendance: 1,276; Referee: Oleksandr Kalyonov

25 August 2024 4	Polissya Zhytomyr	4–0	Obolon Kyiv	Zhytomyr
13:00 EET	Nazarenko 19', 39', 49'; Hutsulyak 23'; Chobotenko (yellow card) 45+1'	Report	Bliznichenko (yellow card) 45+4'; Hrysyo (red card) 54'; Vitenchuk (yellow card) 82'	Stadium: Tsentralnyi Stadion; Attendance: 1,300; Referee: Andriy Kovalenko

31 August 2024 5	Chornomorets Odesa	1–4	Polissya Zhytomyr	Odesa
18:00 EET	Butko 45+4'; Kysil (yellow card) 79'	Report	Nazarenko 3' (pen.); Hutsulyak (yellow card) 4' (goal) 35'; Paixão 8' (yellow card) 90'; Talles Costa (penalty missed) 35'; Makouana (yellow card) 81'; Lyednyev 90+5'	Stadium: Chornomorets Stadium; Referee: Oleksandr Afanasyev

15 September 2024 6	Polissya Zhytomyr	2–1	Veres Rivne	Zhytomyr
18:00 EET	Hutsulyak 50'; Nazarenko 58' (pen.); Babenko (yellow card) 90+1'; Lyednyev (yellow card) 90+4'	Report	Hayduchyk 6'; Vovchenko (yellow card) 63'	Stadium: Tsentralnyi Stadion; Attendance: 1,450; Referee: Oleksandr Afanasyev

22 September 2024 7	Polissya Zhytomyr	1–1	LNZ Cherkasy	Zhytomyr
18:00 EET	Krushynskyi (yellow card) 21'; João Vialle (yellow card) 71'; Hutsulyak 88'	Report	Pasich (yellow card) 26'; Putrya (yellow card) 29'; Topalov 34'; Muravskyi (yellow card) 77'; Bessala (yellow card) 83'	Stadium: Tsentralnyi Stadion; Attendance: 1,471; Referee: Dmytro Panchyshyn

28 September 2024 8	Karpaty Lviv	1–3	Polissya Zhytomyr	Lviv
18:00 EET	Miroshnichenko 19'	Report	Krushynskyi 18' (yellow card) 25'; Hutsulyak 45+1'; Nazarenko 70'	Stadium: Ukraina Stadium; Attendance: 2,200; Referee: Denys Reznikov

6 October 2024 9	Polissya Zhytomyr	2–1	Vorskla Poltava	Zhytomyr
13:00 EET	Hernández 32'; Talles Costa (yellow card) 58'; Smolyakov 71'	Report	Kane 40'; Izotov (yellow card) 82'	Stadium: Tsentralnyi Stadion; Attendance: 1,450; Referee: Vitaliy Romanov

19 October 2024 10	Polissya Zhytomyr	0–0	Livyi Bereh Kyiv	Zhytomyr
18:00 EET	Krushynskyi (yellow card) 64'; Talles Costa (yellow card) 67'; Sarapiy (yellow card) 70'	Report	Spivakov (yellow card) 4'; Shapoval (yellow card) 54'	Stadium: Tsentralnyi Stadion; Attendance: 1,100; Referee: Oleksandr Kalyonov

25 October 2024 11	Polissya Zhytomyr	1–1	Kolos Kovalivka	Zhytomyr
18:00 EET	Talles Costa (yellow card) 2'; Mykhaylichenko (yellow card) 40'; João Vialle (yellow card) 43'; Hutsulyak 54'	Report	Veleten 19'; Kryvoruchko (yellow card) 20'; Popravka (yellow card) 62'; Tsurikov (yellow card) 85'	Stadium: Tsentralnyi Stadion; Attendance: 980; Referee: Andriy Kovalenko

3 November 2024 12	Oleksandriya	1–0	Polissya Zhytomyr	Oleksandriia
15:30 EET	Kovalets (yellow card) 69'; Smyrnyi 83'; Martynyuk (yellow card) 85'	Report	Nazarenko (yellow card) 25'; Smolyakov (yellow card) 59'; Babenko (yellow card) 74'; Sarapiy (yellow card) 90+1'	Stadium: CSC Nika Stadium; Attendance: 1,180; Referee: Oleksandr Shandor

10 November 2024 13	Dynamo Kyiv	2–1	Polissya Zhytomyr	Kyiv
18:00 EET	Vanat 22'; Yarmolenko 27' (pen.); Popov (yellow card) 66'	Report	Mykhaylichenko (yellow card) 39' (yellow-red card) 45'; Smolyakov (yellow card) 45'; Lucas Taylor (yellow card) 82'; Hutsulyak 87'; Babenko (yellow card) 90'; Talles Costa (yellow card) 90+3'	Stadium: Valeriy Lobanovskyi Dynamo Stadium; Attendance: 3,443; Referee: Vitaliy Romanov

25 November 2024 14	Polissya Zhytomyr	1–1	Zorya Luhansk	Zhytomyr
18:00 EET	Lucas Taylor (yellow card) 69'; Sarapiy 85'; Babenko (yellow card) 87'; Bristrić (yellow card) 90+5'	Report	Jordan (yellow card) 27'; Vantukh (yellow card) 30' (yellow-red card) 71'; Budkivskyi 65'; Eskinja (yellow card) 71'	Stadium: Tsentralnyi Stadion; Attendance: 1,000; Referee: Oleksiy Derevinskyi

30 November 2024 15	Kryvbas Kryvyi Rih	3–1	Polissya Zhytomyr	Kryvyi Rih
15:30 EET	Tverdokhlib 11', 72', 86'; Bandeira (yellow card) 84'; Drambayev (yellow card) 90+1'	Report	Makouana (yellow card) 49'; Matić (yellow card) 51'; Hutsulyak 63'; Smolyakov (yellow card) 84'	Stadium: Hirnyk Stadium; Attendance: 565; Referee: Oleksandr Afanasyev

4 December 2024 1	Rukh Lviv	1–1	Polissya Zhytomyr	Lviv
18:00 EET	Klymchuk (yellow card) 32'; Karabin 49'	Report	Krushynskyi (yellow card) 73'; Babenko (yellow card) 76'; Hutsulyak 82'; Matić (yellow card) 86'	Stadium: Arena Lviv; Attendance: 580; Referee: Mykola Balakin

9 December 2024 16	Polissya Zhytomyr	0–1	Rukh Lviv	Zhytomyr
18:00 EET	Wendell (red card); Volynets (yellow card) 64' (yellow-red card) 82'; Nazarenko (yellow card) 69'; Kushnirenko (yellow card) 90+6'	Report	Krasnopir 30' (yellow card) 33'; Kholod (yellow card) 63'; Klymchuk (yellow card) 79'; Didyk (yellow card) 90+6'	Stadium: Tsentralnyi Stadion; Attendance: 400; Referee: Ihor Paskhal

15 December 2024 17	Polissya Zhytomyr	1–0	Shakhtar Donetsk	Zhytomyr
18:00 EET (UTC+2)	Matić (yellow card) 13'; Lucas Taylor (yellow card) 48'; Sarapiy (yellow card) 61'; Mykhaylichenko 90+1'; Bristrić (yellow card) 90+5'	Report	Kryskiv (yellow card) 62'; Sikan (yellow card) 90+3'	Stadium: Tsentralnyi Stadion; Attendance: 2,100; Referee: Vitaliy Romanov

22 February 2025 18	Inhulets Petrove	0–1	Polissya Zhytomyr	Zhytomyr
15:30 EET	Benedyuk (yellow card) 68'	Report	Maisuradze (yellow card) 17'; Sarapiy (yellow card) 58'; Batista 63'	Stadium: Tsentralnyi Stadion; Attendance: 700; Referee: Klym Zabroda

28 February 2025 19	Obolon Kyiv	0–0	Polissya Zhytomyr	Kyiv
13:00 EET	Ilyin (yellow card) 90'	Report	Maisuradze (yellow card) 4'; Lucas Taylor (yellow card) 80'; Batista (yellow card) 90'	Stadium: Obolon Arena; Attendance: 670; Referee: Roman Blavatskyi

6 March 2025 20	Polissya Zhytomyr	3–1	Chornomorets Odesa	Zhytomyr
13:00 EET (UTC+2)	Batista 5'; Babenko (yellow card) 36'; Andriyevskyi 43'; Hutsulyak 78'	Report	Yanakov 57' (pen.); Šporn (yellow card) 64'	Stadium: Tsentralnyi Stadion; Attendance: 1,200; Referee: Denys Shurman

11 March 2025 21	Veres Rivne	5–1	Polissya Zhytomyr	Rivne
15:30 EET	Stepanyuk 13', 45'; Honcharenko (yellow card) 50'; Dakhnovskyi 56'; Hayduchyk 65'; Shevchenko 88'	Report	Batista 33'; Yosefi (yellow card) 86'	Stadium: Avanhard Stadium; Attendance: 1,220; Referee: Dmytro Panchyshyn

28 March 2025 22	LNZ Cherkasy	0–1	Polissya Zhytomyr	Cherkasy
15:30 EET	Putrya (yellow card) 35'; Jashari (yellow card) 76'	Report	Chobotenko (yellow card) 33'; Sarapiy (yellow card) 49'; Krushynskyi 54'; Biton (yellow card) 68'; Babenko (yellow card) 70'; Bristrić (yellow card) 90+1'	Stadium: Cherkasy Arena; Attendance: 860; Referee: Mykola Balakin

7 April 2025 23	Polissya Zhytomyr	1–1	Karpaty Lviv	Zhytomyr
18:00 EET (UTC+2)	Sarapiy (yellow card) 26'; Batista (yellow card) 74'; Hutsulyak 88' (pen.)	Report	Stetskov (yellow card) 56'; Baboglo (yellow card) 58'; Chachua 59'; Miroshnichenko (yellow card) 85'	Stadium: Tsentralnyi Stadion; Attendance: 1,500; Referee: Viktor Kopiyevskyi

13 April 2025 24	Vorskla Poltava	0–2	Polissya Zhytomyr	Poltava
13:00 EET	Avdyli (yellow card) 39'; Krupskyi (yellow card) 78'; Salabay (red card) 88'	Report	Krushynskyi 16'; Matić (yellow card) 42'; Mykhaylichenko (yellow card) 53'; Nazarenko (yellow card) 54'; Sarapiy (yellow card) 71'; Gonçalves (yellow card) 78'; Yosefi 90'	Stadium: Oleksiy Butovsky Vorskla Stadium; Attendance: 2,739; Referee: Vitaliy Romanov

19 April 2025 25	Livyi Bereh Kyiv	1–1	Polissya Zhytomyr	Kyiv Oblast
15:30 EET	Semenov 22'	Report	Krushynskyi 59'	Stadium: Arena Livyi Bereh; Attendance: 944; Referee: Serhiy Zadyran

27 April 2025 26	Kolos Kovalivka	1–1	Polissya Zhytomyr	Kovalivka
15:30 EET	Veleten 57'; Burda (yellow card) 70'	Report	Sarapiy 46'; Hutsulyak (yellow card) 61'; Krushynskyi (yellow card) 62'	Stadium: Kolos Stadium; Attendance: 1,221; Referee: Oleksiy Derevinskyi

4 May 2025 27	Polissya Zhytomyr	1–2	Oleksandriya	Zhytomyr
18:00 EET (UTC+2)	Maisuradze (yellow card) 35' (yellow-red card) 51'; Batista 45+1'; Andriyevskyi (yellow card) 90+4'	Report	Kalyuzhnyi 32'; Martynyuk (yellow card) 56'; Cara 78'; Shabanov (yellow card) 90+4'	Stadium: Tsentralnyi Stadion; Attendance: 2,500; Referee: Mykola Balakin

9 May 2025 28	Polissya Zhytomyr	0–0	Dynamo Kyiv	Zhytomyr
18:00 EET (UTC+2)	Hadroj (yellow card) 79'	Report	Vanat (yellow card) 68'; Popov (yellow card) 69'; Dubinchak (yellow card) 90+1'	Stadium: Tsentralnyi Stadion; Attendance: 4,800; Referee: Vitaly Romanov

17 May 2025 29	Zorya Luhansk	0–1	Polissya Zhytomyr	Kyiv
13:00 EET (UTC+2)	Trontelj (yellow card) 90'	Report	Batista 34'; Maisuradze (yellow card) 61'; Hadroj (yellow card) 74'; Chobotenko (yellow card) 89'; Bristrić (yellow card) 90+2'	Stadium: Valeriy Lobanovskyi Dynamo Stadium; Attendance: 947; Referee: Dmytro Panchyshyn

25 May 2025 30	Polissya Zhytomyr	1–1	Kryvbas Kryvyi Rih	Zhytomyr
18:00 EET	Krushynskyi (yellow card) 4'; Batista 50'; Yosefi (yellow card) 60'; Karaman (yellow card) 90'; Maisuradze (yellow card) 90+3'	Report	Sosah (yellow card) 21'; Tverdokhlib 30'; Vakulko (yellow card) 48'; Konaté (yellow card) 52'; Zaderaka (yellow card) 90+3'	Stadium: Tsentralnyi Stadion; Attendance: 4,500; Referee: Denys Shurman

=== Ukrainian Cup ===
30 October 2024 Round of 16	Polissya Zhytomyr	2–1	Kryvbas Kryvyi Rih	Zhytomyr
15:30 EET	João Vialle (yellow card) 11'; Krushynskyi 44'; Mykhaylichenko (yellow card) 53'; Hutsulyak 72'; Talles Costa (yellow card) 90+3'	Report	Zaderaka 17'	Stadium: Tsentralnyi Stadion; Attendance: 950; Referee: Oleksandr Omelchenko

2 April 2025 Quarter-finals	Veres Rivne	0–1 (a.e.t.)	Polissya Zhytomyr	Rivne
18:00 EET	Protasevych (yellow card) 65'; Shevchenko (yellow card) 90+1'; Klyots (yellow card) 105+2'; Hodya (yellow card) 112'; Kutsia (yellow card) 119'	Report	Babenko (yellow card) 45+1'; Batista 93' (yellow card) 94'; Maisuradze (yellow card) 105+1'; Nazarenko (yellow card) 112'; Andriyevskyi (yellow card) 114'; Bristrić (yellow card) 118'; Kudryk (yellow card) 120+1'	Stadium: Avanhard Stadium; Attendance: 2,960; Referee: Oleksiy Derevinskyi

23 April 2025 Semi-finals	Polissya Zhytomyr	0–1 (a.e.t.)	Shakhtar Donetsk	Zhytomyr
18:00 EET	Hutsulyak (yellow card) 50'; Sarapiy (yellow card) 57'; Babenko (yellow card) 102'; Mykhaylichenko (yellow card) 107'; Talles (yellow card) 120'; Bristrić (yellow card) 120+1'	Report	Tobias (yellow card) 103'; Alisson 114'	Stadium: Tsentralnyi Stadion; Attendance: 4,550; Referee: Dmytro Panchyshyn

=== UEFA Conference League ===
==== Second qualifying round ====
The draw was held on 19 June 2024.

25 July 2024 First leg	Olimpija Ljubljana (Slovenia)	2–0	(Ukraine) Polissya Zhytomyr	Ljubljana, Slovenia
19:00 CEST (UTC+2)	Silva (yellow card) 31'; Kojić (yellow card) 33'; Florucz 56'; Pinto 90+2'	Report	Sarapiy (yellow card) 25'; Budkivskyi (yellow card) 31'; Maisuradze (yellow card) 49'; Krushynskyi (yellow card) 87'	Stadium: Stadion Stožice; Attendance: 3,572; Referee: Javier Alberola Rojas

1 August 2024 Second leg	Polissya Zhytomyr (Ukraine)	1–2 (1–4 agg.)	(Slovenia) Olimpija Ljubljana	Gliwice, Poland
18:00 CEST (UTC+2)	Kushnirenko 1'; Costa (yellow card) 85'; Mykhaylichenko (yellow card) 86'	Report	Florucz 11'; Florucz (yellow card) 62'; Durdov 90+3'	Stadium: Piotr Wieczorek Municipal Stadium; Attendance: 1,296; Referee: Miloš Milanović
Note: Due to the Russian invasion of Ukraine, Ukrainian teams are required to play their home matches at neutral venues until further notice. Therefore, Polissia Zhytomyr will play their home match at Piotr Wieczorek Municipal Stadium, Gliwice, Poland, instead of their regular stadium, Tsentralnyi Stadion, Zhytomyr.
