= 2024–25 FC Kryvbas Kryvyi Rih season =

Kryvbas Kryvyi Rih
2024–25 season
- President: Kostyantyn Karamanits
- Head coach: Yuriy Vernydub
- Stadium: Hirnyk Stadium (main stadium); Košická futbalová aréna (European matches)
- Ukrainian Premier League: 5th
- Ukrainian Cup: Round of 16
- UEFA Europa League: Third qualifying round
- UEFA Conference League: Play-off round
- Top goalscorer: League: Yehor Tverdokhlib (14); All: Yehor Tverdokhlib (14)
Home colours	Away colours	Third colours

The 2024–25 season was FC Kryvbas Kryvyi Rih's 62nd season in existence and the club's 3rd consecutive season in the top flight of Ukrainian football. In addition to the domestic league, Kryvbas Kryvyi Rih participated in that season's editions of the Ukrainian Cup, the UEFA Europa League and the UEFA Conference League. The season covers the period from 1 July 2024 to 30 June 2025.

== Players ==
=== First team squad ===
Squad at the end of season

Note: Flags indicate national team as defined under FIFA eligibility rules; some limited exceptions apply. Players may hold more than one non-FIFA nationality.

No.	Pos.	Nation	Player
1	GK	UKR	Bohdan Khoma
3	DF	UKR	Oleksandr Romanchuk
7	MF	UKR	Andriy Ponyedyelnik
8	MF	NGR	Clement Ikenna (on loan from Levski Sofia)
9	FW	NIG	Daniel Sosah
10	MF	UKR	Dmytro Khomchenovskyi (captain)
11	FW	UKR	Yehor Tverdokhlib
14	MF	UKR	Maksym Lunyov
17	MF	VEN	Maiken González
19	FW	FRA	Noha Ndombasi
20	MF	UKR	Artur Mykytyshyn
21	DF	UKR	Denys Kuzyk
22	MF	UKR	Yuriy Vakulko
23	MF	CRO	Hrvoje Ilić
24	MF	UKR	Volodymyr Yakimets
25	DF	POR	Bandeira

No.	Pos.	Nation	Player
27	MF	BRA	Matteo Amoroso
28	FW	VEN	Gleiker Mendoza (on loan from Angostura)
30	GK	UKR	Volodymyr Makhankov
33	GK	UKR	Andriy Klishchuk
40	MF	CRO	Jan Jurčec
43	GK	UKR	Ihor Omelchenko
45	DF	UKR	Volodymyr Vilivald
55	DF	CMR	Yvan Dibango
59	DF	UKR	Illya Kaplunov
61	MF	UKR	Oleksandr Kamenskyi
63	FW	UKR	Volodymyr Mulyk
64	MF	UKR	Yaroslav Shevchenko
66	DF	MLI	Bakary Konaté
85	FW	UKR	Oleksiy Plichko
94	MF	UKR	Maksym Zaderaka

=== Left during the season ===
Note: Flags indicate national team as defined under FIFA eligibility rules; some limited exceptions apply. Players may hold more than one non-FIFA nationality.

No.	Pos.	Nation	Player
4	FW	NGR	Oche Ochowechi (loan to Gabala)
5	DF	UKR	Tymur Stetskov (to Karpaty Lviv)
6	MF	UKR	Klim Prykhodko (to Livyi Bereh Kyiv)
8	MF	RWA	Djihad Bizimana (to Al Ahli Tripoli)
15	DF	UKR	Oleksandr Drambayev (to LNZ Cherkasy)

No.	Pos.	Nation	Player
65	FW	UKR	Nazar Popov (loan to Inhulets Petrove)
74	DF	UKR	Ihor Snurnitsyn (to Metalist 1925 Kharkiv)
78	FW	UKR	Oleh Kozhushko (to Bukovyna Chernivtsi)
80	FW	GHA	Prince Kwabena Adu (to Viktoria Plzeň)
97	FW	CIV	Jean Morel Poé (to Iraklis Thessaloniki)

== Competitions ==
=== Overall record ===
Competition	First match	Last match	Starting round	Final position	Record							
Competition	First match	Last match	Starting round	Final position	Pld	W	D	L	GF	GA	GD	Win %
Ukrainian Premier League	3 August 2024	25 May 2025	Matchday 1	5th	30	13	8	9	34	26	+8	43.33
Ukrainian Cup	30 October 2024	30 October 2024	Round of 16	Round of 16	1	0	0	1	1	2	−1	0.00
UEFA Europa League	8 August 2024	15 August 2024	Third qualifying round	Third qualifying round	2	0	0	2	1	3	−2	0.00
UEFA Conference League	22 August 2024	29 August 2024	Play-off round	Play-off round	2	0	0	2	0	5	−5	0.00
Total					35	13	8	14	36	36	+0	37.14

Source: Soccerway

=== Ukrainian Premier League ===
==== League table ====
Pos	Team	Pld	W	D	L	GF	GA	GD	Pts	Qualification or relegation
3	Shakhtar Donetsk	30	18	8	4	69	26	+43	62	Qualification for the Europa League first qualifying round (Note: Shakhtar Donetsk qualified for the Europa League first qualifying round by winning the 2024–25 Ukrainian Cup; the second Conference League spot was passed to the fourth-placed team.)
4	Polissya Zhytomyr	30	12	12	6	38	28	+10	48	Qualification for the Conference League second qualifying round
5	Kryvbas Kryvyi Rih	30	13	8	9	34	26	+8	47	
6	Karpaty Lviv	30	13	7	10	42	36	+6	46	
7	Zorya Luhansk	30	12	4	14	34	39	−5	40	

Source: upl.ua
Rules for classification: 1) Points; 2) Head-to-head points; 3) Head-to-head goal difference; 4) Head-to-head goals scored; 5) Goal difference; 6) Goals scored; 7) Draw or "Golden match" if two teams tied for title (Article 22, paragraph 3).
Notes:

Teams that placed 13th and 14th in the 2024–25 Ukrainian Premier League played two-leg play-off with the third and fourth teams of the 2024–25 Ukrainian First League. As a result, both the Ukrainian First League teams (Metalist 1925 and Kudrivka) received promotion after beating the Ukrainian Premier League teams (Vorskla and Livyi Bereh), which in turn were relegated. Due to the Russian 2025 summer escalation and the Russian ballistic missile attack warnings, on 1 June 2025, both matches were suspended but later renewed.

Team 1	Agg.	Team 2	1st leg	2nd leg
Kudrivka	2–2 (4–3 p)	Vorskla Poltava	1–2	1–0
Livyi Bereh Kyiv	0–2	Metalist 1925 Kharkiv	0–1	0–1

=== First Semi-final ===
29 May 2025	Kudrivka	1–2	Vorskla Poltava	Kyiv
15:30	Kozak 83'	Report	Ndukve 23'; Pavlyuk 39'	Stadium: Obolon Arena; Attendance: 1,100; Referee: Dmytro Panchyshyn (Kharkiv)

1 June 2025	Vorskla Poltava	0–1 (3–4 p)	Kudrivka	Poltava
13:00		Report	Lytovchenko 9'	Stadium: Vorskla; Attendance: 2,204; Referee: Mykola Balakin (Kyiv oblast)
	Penalties
	Ndukve (penalty scored); Malysh (penalty scored); Iyede (penalty missed); Kane (penalty missed); Salabay (penalty scored); Sklyar (penalty missed)		(penalty scored) Tuzenko; (penalty missed) Storchous; (penalty scored) Shershen; (penalty scored) Potimkov; (penalty missed) Serdyuk; (penalty scored) Liehostayev

2–2 on aggregate; Kudrivka won 4–3 on penalties and promotion to Premier League. While, Vorskla lost 3–4 on penalties and relegation to First League

=== Second Semi-final ===
29 May 2025	Livyi Bereh Kyiv	0–1	Metalist 1925 Kharkiv	Hnidyn, Kyiv Oblast
18:00		Report	Moura 38'	Stadium: Arena Livyi Bereh; Attendance: 1,167; Referee: Viktor Kopiyevskyi (Kropyvnytskyi)

1 June 2025	Metalist 1925 Kharkiv	1–0	Livyi Bereh Kyiv	Hnidyn, Kyiv Oblast
15:30	Kalitvintsev 90'	Report		Stadium: Arena Livyi Bereh; Attendance: 1,800; Referee: Vitaliy Romanov (Dnipro)

Metalist 1925 Kharkiv won 2–0 on aggregate and promotion to Premier League. While, Livyi Bereh Kyiv lost 0–2 on aggregate and relegation to First League.

==== Results summary ====
Overall								Home						Away					
Pld	W	D	L	GF	GA	GD	Pts	W	D	L	GF	GA	GD	W	D	L	GF	GA	GD
30	13	8	9	34	26	+8	47	7	3	5	21	14	+7	6	5	4	13	12	+1

Last updated: 5 May 2025.
Source: soccerway

==== Matches ====
The match schedule was released on 28 June 2024.

3 August 2024 1	Kryvbas Kryvyi Rih	1–0	Chornomorets Odesa	Kryvyi Rih
18:00 EET	Tverdokhlib 6' (yellow card) 79'; Kozhushko (yellow card) 90+2'	Report		Stadium: Hirnyk Stadium; Attendance: 587; Referee: Maksym Kozyryatskyi

11 August 2024 2	Karpaty Lviv	3–0	Kryvbas Kryvyi Rih	Lviv
15:30 EEST (UTC+03:00)	Shakh 39'; Polehenko 42'; Chachua 81'	Report	Lunyov (penalty missed) 19'; Amoroso (yellow card) 48'; Bizimana (yellow card) 59'	Stadium: Ukraina Stadium; Attendance: 3,500; Referee: Oleksiy Derevinskyi

18 August 2024 3	Veres Rivne	0–2	Kryvbas Kryvyi Rih	Rivne
15:30 EET	Smiyan (yellow card) 11' (yellow-red card) 28'; Honcharenko (yellow card) 44'	Report	Adu 12'; Lunyov (yellow card) 25'; Romanchuk (red card) 52'; Stetskov 81' (pen.)	Stadium: Avanhard Stadium; Attendance: 1,587; Referee: Mykola Balakin

25 August 2024 4	Kryvbas Kryvyi Rih	1–1	Inhulets Petrove	Kryvyi Rih
18:00 EET	Ponyedyelnik (yellow card) 14'; Dibango (yellow card) 17'; Kozhushko 40'	Report	Pyatov 6'; Kozak (yellow card) 66'	Stadium: Hirnyk Stadium; Attendance: 534; Referee: Roman Blavatskyi

15 September 2024 6	Livyi Bereh Kyiv	0–1	Kryvbas Kryvyi Rih	Kyiv Oblast
15:30 EET	Yakymiv (yellow card) 69'	Report	Bandeira (yellow card) 67'; Zaderaka 81'; Romanchuk (yellow card) 86'	Stadium: Arena Livyi Bereh; Attendance: 1,087; Referee: Ihor Paskhal

22 September 2024 7	Kryvbas Kryvyi Rih	1–1	Vorskla Poltava	Kryvyi Rih
15:30 EET	Sosah 45+2'	Report	Iyede 41'; Myakushko (yellow card) 45+1'; Chelyadin (yellow card) 47'; Perduta (yellow card) 69'; Kulakovskyi (yellow card) 90+3'	Stadium: Hirnyk Stadium; Attendance: 600; Referee: Oleksandr Shandor

28 September 2024 8	Kryvbas Kryvyi Rih	0–1	Oleksandriya	Kryvyi Rih
13:00 EET	Bizimana (yellow card) 22'; Mykytyshyn (yellow card) 34'; Bandeira (yellow card) 90+3'	Report	Kalyuzhnyi (yellow card) 18'; Filippov 45+1'; Smyrnyi (yellow card) 50'	Stadium: Hirnyk Stadium; Attendance: 480; Referee: Oleh Derevinskyi

6 October 2024 9	Dynamo Kyiv	2–1	Kryvbas Kryvyi Rih	Kyiv
18:00 EEST (UTC+3)	Rubchynskyi 5'; Buyalskyi 25' (pen.); Yarmolenko (yellow card) 53'; Andriyevskyi (yellow card) 85'	Report	Mykhavko 45+3' (o.g.); Poé (yellow card) 47'; Bizimana (yellow card) 64'; Ilić (yellow card) 90+4'; Amoroso (yellow card) 90+4'	Stadium: Valeriy Lobanovskyi Dynamo Stadium; Attendance: 1,794; Referee: Mykola Balakin

20 October 2024 10	Zorya Luhansk	0–1	Kryvbas Kryvyi Rih	Kyiv
18:00 EET		Report	Sosah 48'	Stadium: Valeriy Lobanovskyi Dynamo Stadium; Attendance: 386; Referee: Maksym Kozyryatskyi

26 October 2024 11	Kryvbas Kryvyi Rih	3–1	LNZ Cherkasy	Kryvyi Rih
15:30 EET	Ilić 24'; Zaderaka (yellow card) 26'; Ponyedyelnik 58'; Drambayev 90+4'	Report	Topalov (yellow card) 17'; Thill (yellow card) 44'; Naumets 78'	Stadium: Hirnyk Stadium; Attendance: 766; Referee: Roman Blavatskyi

4 November 2024 12	Kryvbas Kryvyi Rih	1–1	Rukh Lviv	Kryvyi Rih
15:30 EET	Zaderaka 47'; Tverdokhlib (yellow card) 82'	Report	Karabin 36'; Didyk (yellow card) 40'	Stadium: Hirnyk Stadium; Attendance: 327; Referee: Maksym Kozyryatskyi

9 November 2024 13	Kolos Kovalivka	1–1	Kryvbas Kryvyi Rih	Kovalivka
18:00 EET	Veleten (yellow card) 37'; Bolívar 65'; Tretyakov (yellow card) 72'; Kozik (yellow card) 88'	Report	Bizimana (yellow card) 29'; Tverdokhlib 47'; Ponyedyelnik (yellow card) 50'; Sosah (yellow card) 70'	Stadium: Kolos Stadium; Attendance: 456; Referee: Viktor Kopiyevskyi

24 November 2024 14	Obolon Kyiv	0–1	Kryvbas Kryvyi Rih	Kyiv
13:00 EET	Slobodyan (penalty missed) 32'; Chernenko (yellow card) 44'; Pryimak (yellow card) 61'; Dubko (yellow card) 63'; Bliznichenko (yellow card) 82'	Report	Tverdokhlib 25' (yellow card) 77'; Shevchenko (yellow card) 28'; Sosah (yellow card) 51'	Stadium: Obolon Arena; Attendance: 720; Referee: Dmytro Panchyshyn

30 November 2024 15	Kryvbas Kryvyi Rih	3–1	Polissya Zhytomyr	Kryvyi Rih
15:30 EET	Tverdokhlib 11', 72', 86'; Bandeira (yellow card) 84'; Drambayev (yellow card) 90+1'	Report	Makouana (yellow card) 49'; Matić (yellow card) 51'; Hutsulyak 63'; Smolyakov (yellow card) 84'	Stadium: Hirnyk Stadium; Attendance: 565; Referee: Oleksandr Afanasyev

7 December 2024 16	Chornomorets Odesa	1–3	Kryvbas Kryvyi Rih	Odesa
15:30 EET	Skyba 34' (yellow card) 89'; Khoblenko (yellow card) 39'; Popov (yellow card) 65'; Šporn (yellow card) 87'	Report	Ilić 41' (pen.); Mykytyshyn 45+1'; Tverdokhlib 80'	Stadium: Chornomorets Stadium; Attendance: 0 Referee: Viktor Kopiyevskyi

14 December 2024 17	Kryvbas Kryvyi Rih	2–0	Karpaty Lviv	Kryvyi Rih
15:30 EET (UTC+02:00)	Ilić 27' (pen.); Vakulko (yellow card) 56'; Tverdokhlib 69'	Report	Miroshnichenko (yellow card) 33'; Igor Neves (yellow card) 34'	Stadium: Hirnyk Stadium; Attendance: 593; Referee: Dmytro Panchyshyn

22 February 2025 18	Kryvbas Kryvyi Rih	0–3	Veres Rivne	Rivne
13:00 EET	Ilić (yellow card) 45'; Bandeira (yellow card) 52'; Kuzyk (yellow card) 61'	Report	Sharay 28'; Hayduchyk 41'; Kucherov (yellow card) 51'; Kutsia (yellow card) 69'; Kharatin 72'	Stadium: Avanhard Stadium; Attendance: 516; Referee: Viktor Kopiyevskyi

2 March 2025 19	Inhulets Petrove	2–0	Kryvbas Kryvyi Rih	Kryvyi Rih
13:00 EET (UTC+2)	Pushkaryov 14'; Benedyuk 41'; Dykhtyaruk (yellow card) 81'	Report	Sosah (yellow card) 44'; Vilivald (yellow card) 66'	Stadium: Hirnyk Stadium; Attendance: 485; Referee: Serhiy Zadyran

6 March 2025 20	Shakhtar Donetsk	1–1	Kryvbas Kryvyi Rih	Lviv
18:00 EET (UTC+2)	Pedro Henrique (yellow card) 48'; Bondarenko 67'; Marlon Gomes (yellow card) 68'	Report	Mykytyshyn (yellow card) 44'; Mendoza 57'; Lunyov (yellow card) 68'; Kuzyk (yellow card) 73'; Klishchuk (yellow card) 90+3'; Dibango (yellow card) 90+5'	Stadium: Arena Lviv; Attendance: 2,500; Referee: Oleksiy Derevinskyi

30 March 2025 22	Vorskla Poltava	0–1	Kryvbas Kryvyi Rih	Poltava
13:00 EET	Sklyar (yellow card) 51'; Malysh (yellow card) 55'; Isenko (yellow card) 90+3'	Report	Tverdokhlib 40' (yellow card) 58'	Stadium: Oleksiy Butovsky Vorskla Stadium; Attendance: 2,506; Referee: Mykhaylo Rayda

6 April 2025 23	Oleksandriya	1–0	Kryvbas Kryvyi Rih	Oleksandriya
13:00 EET	Cara (yellow card) 56'; Juan Alvina 57'; Kravchenko (yellow card) 79'; Kalyuzhnyi (yellow card) 84'	Report	Konaté (yellow card) 90+2'	Stadium: CSC Nika Stadium; Attendance: 1,014; Referee: Oleksandr Shandor

12 April 2025 24	Kryvbas Kryvyi Rih	0–2	Dynamo Kyiv	Kryvyi Rih
13:00 EET (UTC+2)	Zaderaka (yellow card) 29'; Konaté (yellow card) 33'	Report	Yarmolenko 35' (yellow card) 38'; Popov (red card) 67'; Shaparenko (yellow card) 72'; Vanat 74'; Brazhko (yellow card) 79'; Mykhavko (yellow card) 85'	Stadium: Hirnyk Stadium; Attendance: 1,398; Referee: Mykola Balakin

16 April 2025 5	Kryvbas Kryvyi Rih	1–2	Shakhtar Donetsk	Kryvyi Rih
14:00 EEST (UTC+3)	Bizimana (yellow card) 5'; Ilić (penalty missed) 77'; Tverdokhlib 85'; Vakulko (yellow card) 87'	Report	Matviyenko (yellow card) 38'; Stepanenko 40'; Kevin 62'	Stadium: Hirnyk Stadium; Attendance: 450; Referee: Denys Shurman
Note: Match originally scheduled for 1 September 2024, but abandoned in the 51st minute due to an air-raid siren. Remaining minutes were played on 16 April 2025.

20 April 2025 25	Kryvbas Kryvyi Rih	3–0	Zorya Luhansk	Kryvyi Rih
13:00 EET	Romanchuk 32'; Dibango (yellow card) 64'; Mykytyshyn 66'; Tverdokhlib 86'; Vakulko (yellow card) 89'; Mulyk (yellow card) 90+3'	Report	Mićin (yellow card) 32'; Bašić (red card) 38'; Trontelj (yellow card) 64'; Dryshlyuk (yellow card) 70'; Jordan (yellow card) 89'	Stadium: Hirnyk Stadium; Attendance: 300; Referee: Ihor Paskhal

26 April 2025 26	LNZ Cherkasy	0–0	Kryvbas Kryvyi Rih	Cherkasy
15:30 EET	Putrya (yellow card) 34'; Tankovskyi (yellow card) 55'; Jashari (yellow card) 69'; Thill (yellow card) 84'	Report	Ponyedyelnik (yellow card) 9'; Mykytyshyn (yellow card) 71'	Stadium: Cherkasy Arena; Attendance: 650; Referee: Andriy Kovalenko

2 May 2025 27	Rukh Lviv	0–0	Kryvbas Kryvyi Rih	Lviv
18:00 EET (UTC+2)	Kitela (yellow card) 39'; Ryabov (yellow card) 40'	Report	Romanchuk (yellow card) 24'	Stadium: Arena Lviv; Attendance: 850; Referee: Viktor Kopiyevskyi

7 May 2025 21	Kryvbas Kryvyi Rih	4–0	Livyi Bereh Kyiv	Kryvyi Rih
13:00 EEST (UTC+3)	Kuzyk 27'; Ilić (yellow card) 45+1'; Tverdokhlib 47', 90'; Sosah 69'	Report	Kohut (yellow card) 31'	Stadium: Hirnyk Stadium; Attendance: 470; Referee: Roman Blavatskyi
Note: Match originally scheduled for 15 March 2025, but abandoned in the 2nd minute due to an air-raid siren. Remaining minutes were played on 7 May 2025.

11 May 2025 28	Kryvbas Kryvyi Rih	0–1	Kolos Kovalivka	Kryvyi Rih
13:00 EET		Report	Elias 8'; Krasniqi (yellow card) 45'	Stadium: Hirnyk Stadium; Attendance: 521; Referee: Oleksandr Afanasyev

17 May 2025 29	Kryvbas Kryvyi Rih	1–0	Obolon Kyiv	Kryvyi Rih
13:00 EET	Kuzyk 47' (yellow card) 90+3'; Ikenna (yellow card) 83'	Report	Bliznichenko (yellow card) 75'; Ilyin (yellow card) 86'	Stadium: Hirnyk Stadium; Attendance: 590; Referee: Oleksandr Omelchenko

25 May 2025 30	Polissya Zhytomyr	1–1	Kryvbas Kryvyi Rih	Zhytomyr
18:00 EET	Krushynskyi (yellow card) 4'; Batista 50'; Yosefi (yellow card) 60'; Karaman (yellow card) 90'; Maisuradze (yellow card) 90+3'	Report	Sosah (yellow card) 21'; Tverdokhlib 30'; Vakulko (yellow card) 48'; Konaté (yellow card) 52'; Zaderaka (yellow card) 90+3'	Stadium: Tsentralnyi Stadion; Attendance: 4,500; Referee: Denys Shurman

=== Ukrainian Cup ===
30 October 2024 Round of 16	Polissya Zhytomyr	2–1	Kryvbas Kryvyi Rih	Zhytomyr
15:30 EET	Vialle (yellow card) 11'; Krushynskyi 44'; Mykhaylichenko (yellow card) 53'; Hutsulyak 72'; Talles Costa (yellow card) 90+3'	Report	Zaderaka 17'	Stadium: Tsentralnyi Stadion; Attendance: 950; Referee: Oleksandr Omelchenko

=== UEFA Europa League ===
==== Third qualifying round ====
The draw was held on 22 July 2024.

8 August 2024 First leg	Kryvbas Kryvyi Rih (Ukraine)	1–2	(Czech Republic) Viktoria Plzeň	Košice, Slovakia
20:00 CEST (UTC+2)	Adu (yellow card) 17' (goal) 20'; Dibango (yellow card) 63'; Vakulko (yellow card) 74'	Report	Panoš (yellow card) 32' (goal) 49'; Vašulín 69' (yellow card) 74'	Stadium: Košická futbalová aréna Attendance: 1,800; Referee: (Austria) Sebastian Gishamer
Note: Due to the Russian invasion of Ukraine, Ukrainian teams were required to play their home matches at neutral venues until further notice. Therefore, Kryvbas Kryvyi Rih played their home match at Košická futbalová aréna in Košice, Slovakia, instead of their regular stadium, Hirnyk Stadium in Kryvyi Rih.

15 August 2024 Second leg	Viktoria Plzeň (Czech Republic)	1–0 (3–1 agg.)	(Ukraine) Kryvbas Kryvyi Rih	Plzeň, Czech Republic
19:00 CEST (UTC+2)	Vašulín 52'	Report	Klishchuk (yellow card) 15'; Stetskov (yellow card) 43'; Khomchenovskyi (yellow card) 77'; Adu (yellow card) 88'	Stadium: Doosan Arena; Attendance: 10,657; Referee: (Romania) Horațiu Feșnic

=== UEFA Conference League ===
==== Play-off round ====
The draw was held on 5 August 2024.

22 August 2024 First leg	Kryvbas Kryvyi Rih (Ukraine)	0–2	(Spain) Real Betis	Košice, Slovakia
20:00 CEST (UTC+2)	Adu (yellow card) 43'	Report	Ávila 13'; Ezzalzouli (yellow card) 33'; Rodri 62'	Stadium: Košická futbalová aréna Attendance: 4,372; Referee: (Turkey) Arda Kardeşler
Note: Due to the Russian invasion of Ukraine, Ukrainian teams were required to play their home matches at neutral venues until further notice. Therefore, Kryvbas Kryvyi Rih played their home match at Košická futbalová aréna in Košice, Slovakia, instead of their regular stadium, Hirnyk Stadium in Kryvyi Rih.

29 August 2024 Second leg	Real Betis (Spain)	3–0 (5–0 agg.)	(Ukraine) Kryvbas Kryvyi Rih	Seville, Spain
21:00 CEST (UTC+2)	Ruibal 40'; Ezzalzouli 41', 43'	Report		Stadium: Benito Villamarín Stadium; Attendance: 41,445; Referee: (Croatia) Igor Pajac
