= Central City Stadium =

Central City Stadium is the English translation of the following Ukrainian stadiums:

- Tsentralnyi Stadion (Cherkasy)
- Tsentralnyi Stadion (Makariv)
- Tsentralnyi Stadion (Mykolaiv)
- Tsentralnyi Stadion (Uman)
- Tsentralnyi Stadion (Vinnytsia)
- Tsentralnyi Stadion (Zhytomyr)

== See also ==
- Central Stadium (disambiguation)
