= Talles =

Talles may refer to:

- Talles (footballer) (born 1998), Brazilian footballer, full name Talles Brener de Paula, known as Talles
- Talles Costa (born 2002), Brazilian footballer, full name Talles Macedo Toledo Costa, known as Talles
- Thomas Tallis (1505–1585), English composer, also known as Talles
