= Tsentralnyi Stadion (Mykolaiv) =

Sports venue in Mykolaiv, Ukraine

- Central City Stadium
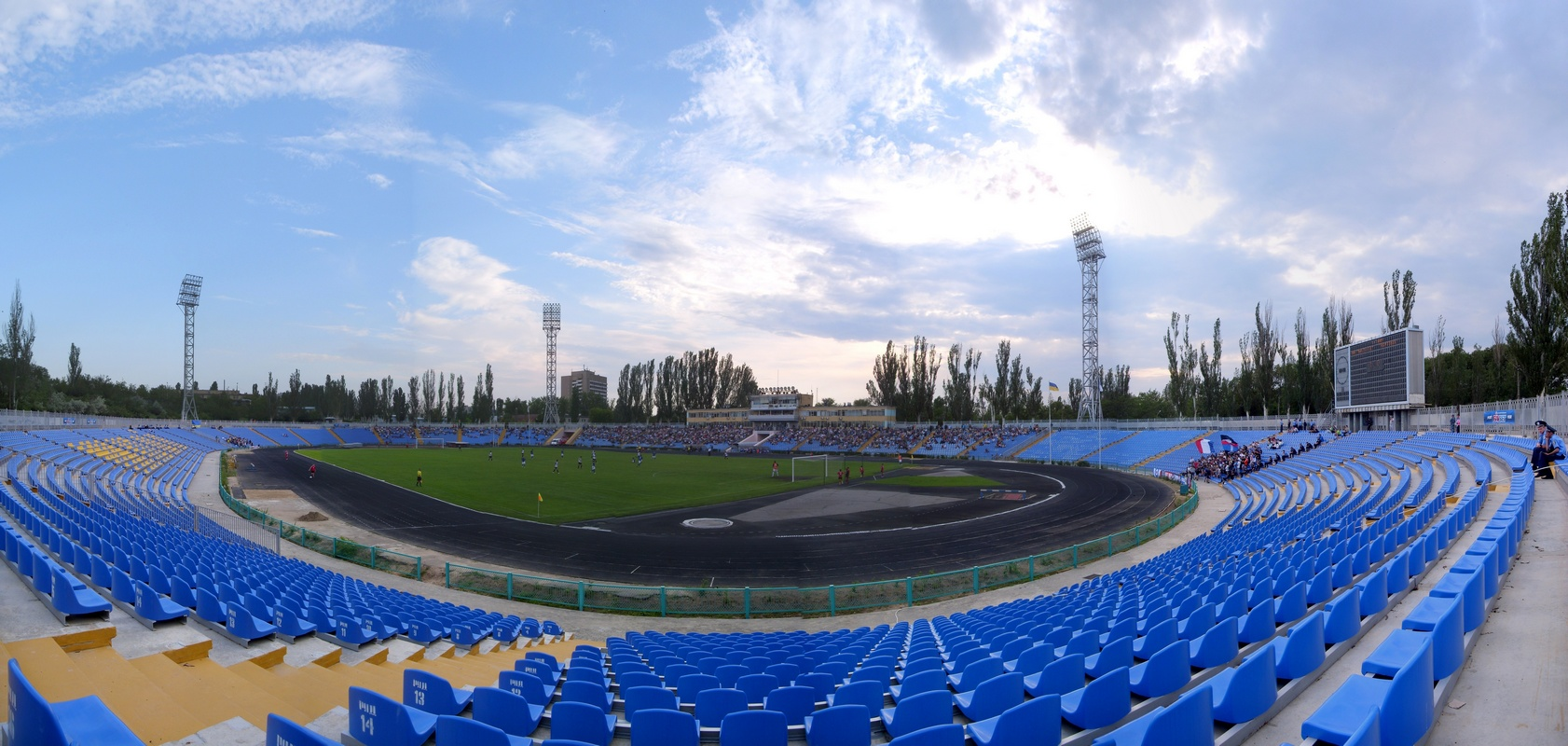
- View of the stadium.
- Interactive map of Tsentralnyi Stadion
- Former names: Central City Stadium
- Location: vul. Sportyvna 23 54015 Mykolaiv, Ukraine
- Coordinates: 46°58′17″N 31°57′37″E
- Owner: Mykolaiv Oblast Council
- Operator: MFC Mykolaiv
- Capacity: 15 640
- Surface: Artificial grass
- Field size: 110×90 m (grass); 104x67 m (artificial)

Construction
- Opened: 1965
- Renovated: 2018
- Expanded: 2019
- Demolished: 28 June 2022
- Cost: 680 000 Karbovanets

Tenant
- MFC Mykolaiv since 1965 until 2022; Vast Mykolaiv since 2014 until 2022

Stadion Tsentralnyi (or Central City Stadium) is a stadium in Mykolaiv, Ukraine, which was built in 1965. Currently it has a capacity of 16,700, in an all-seater configuration. It is the home stadium of the football club MFK Mykolaiv.

The stadium was badly damaged during the Russian invasion of Ukraine in spring 2022.

== See also ==
- Central Stadium
