= Admir Bristrić =

Bosnian footballer (born 2003)

Personal information
- Date of birth: 28 April 2003 (age 23)
- Place of birth: Tuzla, Bosnia and Herzegovina
- Height: 1.87 m (6 ft 2 in)
- Positions: Forward; winger

Team information
- Current team: Leicester City
- Number: 9

Youth career
- –2018: Zvijezda Gradačac
- 2018–2020: Željezničar Slavonski Brod
- 2020–2021: Zrinjski Mostar
- 2021: Sloboda Tuzla
- 2021–2022: Rijeka

Senior career*
Years	Team	Apps	(Gls)
2022	Rijeka	1	(0)
2022	→ Hrvatski Dragovoljac (loan)	14	(1)
2023–2026	Olimpija Ljubljana	40	(6)
2024–2025	→ Polissya Zhytomyr (loan)	12	(0)
2024–2025	→ Polissya-2 Zhytomyr (loan)	3	(3)
2025–2026	→ Bravo (loan)	24	(10)
2026–	Leicester City	5	(0)

International career^{‡}
2019	Bosnia and Herzegovina U17	4	(1)
2021–2022	Bosnia and Herzegovina U19	10	(2)
2022–2024	Bosnia and Herzegovina U21	14	(6)
- * Club domestic league appearances and goals as of 17:39, 24 September 2026 (UTC) ‡ National team caps and goals as of 15 October 2024

Admir Bristrić (born 28 April 2003) is a Bosnian professional footballer who plays as a forward for EFL League One club Leicester City.

== Club career ==
Bristrić was born in Tuzla and grew up in Gradačac. He began his football career with ŠN Trijumf at the age of 6, before joining the youth ranks of his hometown club Zvijezda Gradačac. He then spent a short time in the academy of the Croatian club Osijek, but due to paperwork problems he could not be signed and registered and therefore returned to Bosnia and Herzegovina in 2020, signing with Zrinjski Mostar. A year later, he switched to Sloboda Tuzla's youth setup, and then returned to Croatia with Rijeka in June 2021.

In early 2022, Rijeka sent him on a six-month loan to Hrvatski Dragovoljac. There, Bristrić made his senior debut in the 1. HNL, making fourteen appearances and scoring his first career goal in a 5–0 triumph over Šibenik on 11 February.

In January 2023, Bristrić moved to Slovenia by committing to Olimpija Ljubljana of the top-tier Slovenian PrvaLiga. The transfer was announced on 15 December 2022 and he signed a contract until June 2026. On 22 February 2023, Bristrić scored his first two goals for Olimpija, in a league game against Gorica, which Olimpija won 4–3. Bristrić stood out again on 15 March, during a league match against Celje, scoring the only goal of the game in a 1–0 win. With Olimpija, Bristrić won the Slovenian PrvaLiga title in 2022–23, and contributed four goals in fourteen league appearances.

On 11 August 2026, Bristrić moved to England, signing a deal with EFL League One side Leicester City.

== International career ==
Bristrić has been capped for Bosnia and Herzegovina at all youth levels from under-17 to under-21.

== Career statistics ==
=== Club ===
As of match played 23 September 2026

Appearances and goals by club, season and competition
Club	Season	League			National cup (Note: Includes Slovenian Cup)		League cup (Note: Includes EFL Cup)		Continental		Other (Note: Includes EFL Trophy)		Total	
Club	Season	Division	Apps	Goals	Apps	Goals	Apps	Goals	Apps	Goals	Apps	Goals	Apps	Goals
Hrvatski Dragovoljac (loan)	2021–22	Croatian Football League	14	1	0	0	—		—		—		14	1
Rijeka	2022–23	Croatian Football League	1	0	0	0	—		—		—		1	0
Olimpija Ljubljana	2022–23	Slovenian PrvaLiga	14	4	3	0	—		—		—		17	4
Olimpija Ljubljana	2023–24	Slovenian PrvaLiga	25	2	1	0	—		10 (Note: Four appearances in UEFA Champions League; one appearance in UEFA Europa League; five appearances in UEFA Conference League)	0	—		36	2
Olimpija Ljubljana	2025–26	Slovenian PrvaLiga	0	0	0	0	—		2 (Note: One appearances in UEFA Champions League; one appearance in UEFA Conference League)	0	—		2	0
Olimpija Ljubljana	2026–27	Slovenian PrvaLiga	2	0	0	0	—		—		—		2	0
Olimpija Ljubljana	Total		41	6	4	0	—		12	0	—		57	6
Polissya Zhytomyr (loan)	2024–25	Ukrainian Premier League	12	0	3	0	—		2 (Note: Appearance(s) in UEFA Conference League)	0	—		17	0
Bravo (loan)	2025–26	Slovenian PrvaLiga	24	11	4	3	—		—		—		28	14
Leicester City	2026–27	EFL League One	5	0	0	0	1	0	—		1	3	7	3
Career total			97	18	11	3	1	0	14	0	1	3	124	24

== Honours ==
Olimpija Ljubljana

- Slovenian PrvaLiga: 2022–23
- Slovenian Cup: 2022–23
