= Yevheniy Shevchenko (footballer) =

Ukrainian footballer

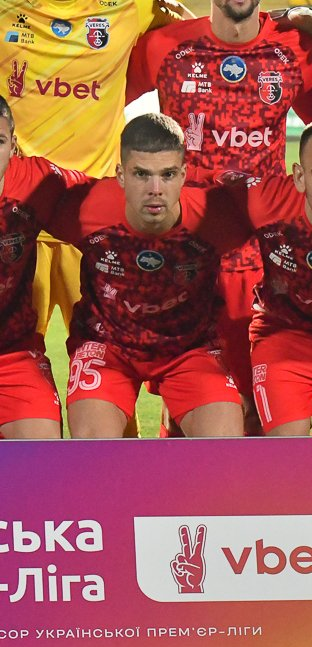

Personal information
- Full name: Yevheniy Kostyantynovych Shevchenko
- Date of birth: 2 December 1995 (age 30)
- Place of birth: Brovary, Ukraine
- Height: 1.75 m (5 ft 9 in)
- Position: Left back

Team information
- Current team: Obolon Kyiv
- Number: 5

Youth career
- 2006–2007: Darnytsya-KSDYuShOR Kyiv
- 2008–2009: RVUFK Kyiv
- 2009: Knyazha Shchaslyve
- 2009–2010: Darnytsya-KSDYuShOR Kyiv
- 2010: Zirka Kyiv
- 2010–2012: Knyazha Shchaslyve
- 2013: Metalurh Donetsk

Senior career*
Years	Team	Apps	(Gls)
2013	Metalurh Donetsk	0	(0)
2014	Lokomotyv Kyiv	0	(0)
2015–2020	Obolon-Brovar Kyiv	91	(4)
2019–2020	→ Obolon-2 Bucha	4	(1)
2020–2021	Polissya Zhytomyr	10	(1)
2021–2022	VPK-Ahro Shevchenkivka	17	(3)
2022–2023	Epitsentr Kamianets-Podilskyi	22	(1)
2023–2025	Veres Rivne	45	(3)
2025–	Obolon Kyiv	26	(0)
- * Club domestic league appearances and goals as of 3 June 2026

Yevheniy Kostyantynovych Shevchenko (Ukrainian: Євгеній Костянтинович Шевченко; born 2 December 1995) is a Ukrainian professional footballer who plays as a left back for Ukrainian club Obolon Kyiv.
