= Denys Kuzyk =

Ukrainian footballer

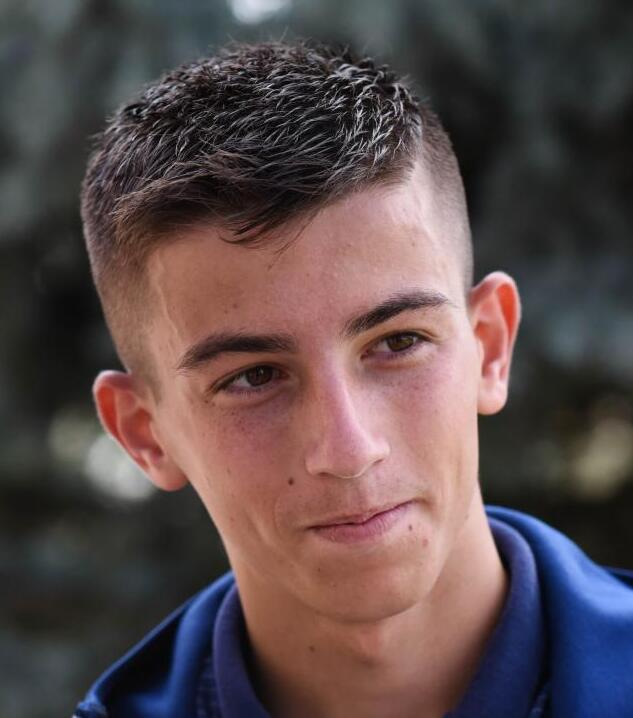

Personal information
- Full name: Denys Viktorovych Kuzyk
- Date of birth: 18 September 2002 (age 24)
- Place of birth: Bohdanivka, Pidvolochysk Raion, Ternopil Oblast, Ukraine
- Height: 1.79 m (5 ft 10 in)
- Position: Left-back

Team information
- Current team: LNZ Cherkasy
- Number: 17

Youth career
- 2013–2015: DYuSSh Pidvolochysk
- 2015–2021: Dynamo Kyiv

Senior career*
Years	Team	Apps	(Gls)
2021–2023	Dynamo Kyiv	0	(0)
2021–2022	→ Chornomorets Odesa (loan)	14	(0)
2022	→ Kolos Kovalivka (loan)	4	(0)
2023	→ Lviv (loan)	13	(0)
2023–2025	Kryvbas Kryvyi Rih	55	(7)
2025–	LNZ Cherkasy	30	(3)

International career^{‡}
2017–2018	Ukraine U16	8	(0)
2019	Ukraine U18	2	(0)
2021–2024	Ukraine U21	7	(0)
- * Club domestic league appearances and goals as of 3 June 2026 ‡ National team caps and goals as of 19 June 2025

Denys Viktorovych Kuzyk (Ukrainian: Денис Вікторович Кузик; born 18 September 2002) is a Ukrainian professional footballer who plays as a left-back for LNZ Cherkasy.

== Club career ==
=== Early years ===
Kuzyk started his career at DYuSSh Pidvolochysk under Valeriy Kolotiy.

=== Dynamo Kyiv ===
==== Loan to Chornomorets Odesa ====
In July 2021, he joined Chornomorets Odesa on loan, making his league on 25 July against Desna Chernihiv.

==== Loan to Lviv ====
In January 2023 he went on loan to Lviv.
