= Hrvoje Ilić =

Croatian footballer (born 1999)

Personal information
- Date of birth: April 14, 1999 (age 27)
- Place of birth: Slavonski Brod, Croatia
- Height: 1.76 m (5 ft 9 in)
- Position: Midfielder

Team information
- Current team: Yelimay
- Number: 23

Youth career
- –2013: Osijek
- 2013–2017: Dinamo Zagreb
- 2017: Pescara

Senior career*
| Years | Team | Apps | (Gls) |
| 2017–2019 | Osijek | 1 | (0) |
| 2018 | → Dugopolje (loan) | 4 | (0) |
| 2019 | → BSK Bijelo Brdo (loan) | 9 | (5) |
| 2019 | → Osijek II (loan) | 14 | (1) |
| 2020 | Hrvatski Dragovoljac | 16 | (1) |
| 2021–2022 | BSK Bijelo Brdo | 61 | (7) |
| 2023 | Hapoel Tel Aviv | 10 | (2) |
| 2023–2025 | Kryvbas Kryvyi Rih | 44 | (6) |
| 2026– | Yelimay | 29 | (0) |
- * Club domestic league appearances and goals as of 1 November 2026

Hrvoje Ilić (born 14 April 1999) is a Croatian professional footballer who plays as a midfielder for Kazakhstani club Yelimay.

== Early life ==
He grew up in Županja, Croatia.

== Career ==
He was described as "considered the new great talent of Croatian football".

== Style of play ==
He mainly operates as a midfielder and is left-footed.
