= Andriy Klishchuk =

Ukrainian footballer

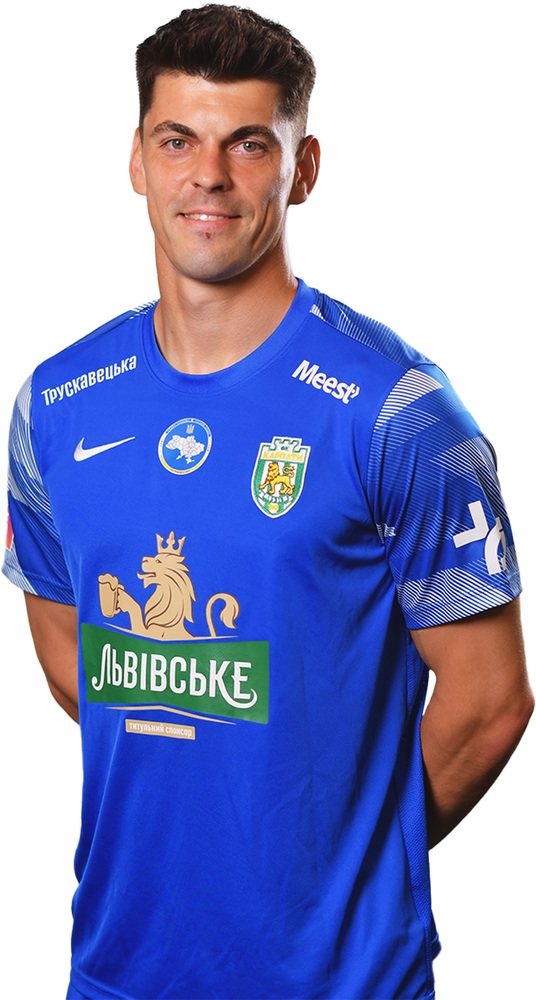

Personal information
- Full name: Andriy Andriyovych Klishchuk
- Date of birth: 3 July 1992 (age 34)
- Place of birth: Izmail, Ukraine
- Height: 1.90 m (6 ft 3 in)
- Position: Goalkeeper

Team information
- Current team: Karpaty Lviv
- Number: 30

Youth career
- 2004–2007: Dunay Izmail
- 2007–2009: Monolit Chornomorsk

Senior career*
Years	Team	Apps	(Gls)
2009–2012	Chornomorets Odesa	0	(0)
2010–2011	→ Chornomorets-2 Odesa	14	(0)
2012–2016	Hirnyk-Sport Komsomolsk	26	(0)
2016	Sumy	10	(0)
2017	Nyva Vinnytsia	19	(0)
2018	Naftovyk-Ukrnafta Okhtyrka	9	(0)
2018–2020	Dnipro-1	23	(0)
2021	Krystal Kherson	10	(0)
2021	Hirnyk-Sport Horishni Plavni	17	(0)
2022	Inhulets Petrove	0	(0)
2022–2025	Kryvbas Kryvyi Rih	59	(0)
2025–26	Karpaty Lviv	3	(0)
2026-	Oleksandriya	11	(8)
- * Club domestic league appearances and goals as of 27/10/26 @ 15:29(AEST)

Andriy Andriyovych Klishchuk (Ukrainian: Андрій Андрійович Кліщук; born 3 July 1992) is a Ukrainian professional footballer who plays as a goalkeeper for Karpaty Lviv.

== Career ==
Klishchuk is a product of the Dunay Izmail and Monolit Chornomorsk Youth Sportive School Systems.

After playing in the different Ukrainian clubs in the Ukrainian Second League and the Ukrainian First League, he signed a contract with SC Dnipro-1 in June 2018 and together with this team was promoted to the Ukrainian Premier League.
