= Artur Mykytyshyn =

Ukrainian footballer

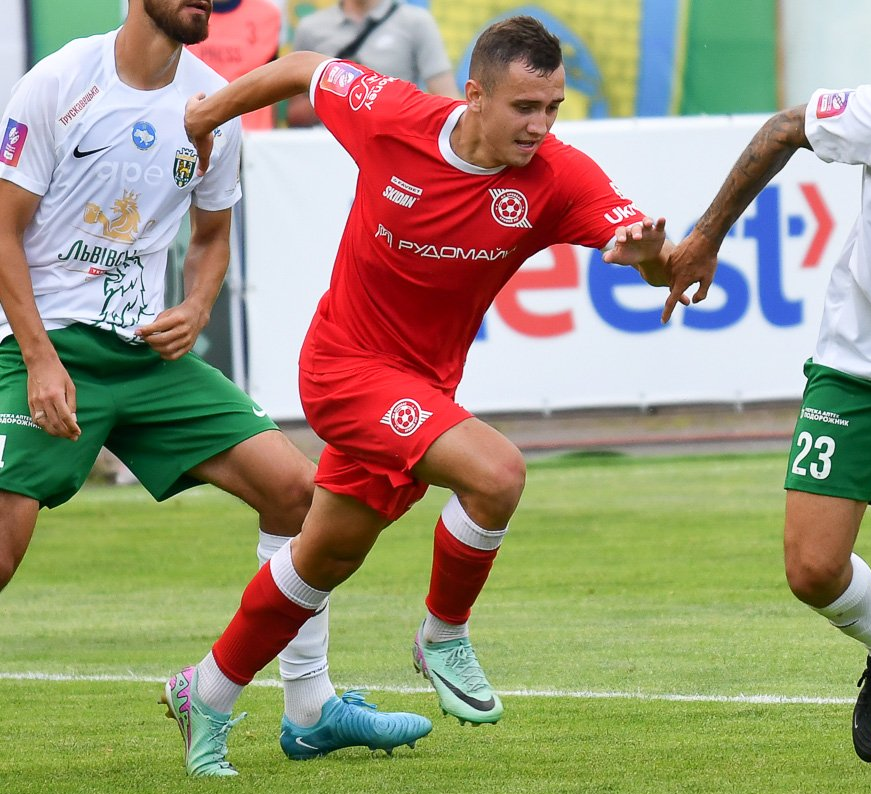

Personal information
- Full name: Artur Petrovych Mykytyshyn
- Date of birth: 14 July 2003 (age 23)
- Place of birth: Tysmenychany, Ivano-Frankivsk Oblast, Ukraine
- Height: 1.76 m (5 ft 9 in)
- Position: Left winger

Team information
- Current team: LNZ Cherkasy
- Number: 7

Youth career
- 2016: Arsenal Tysmenychany
- 2016–2019: Skala Morshyn
- 2019: VIK-Volyn Volodymyr-Volynskyi
- 2019–2021: Shakhtar Donetsk

Senior career*
Years	Team	Apps	(Gls)
2021–2023	Shakhtar Donetsk	0	(0)
2021	→ Mariupol (loan)	11	(1)
2022	→ III. Kerületi (loan)	4	(0)
2022–2023	→ Kryvbas Kryvyi Rih (loan)	20	(1)
2023	Oleksandriya	5	(0)
2024–2025	Kryvbas Kryvyi Rih	45	(5)
2026–	LNZ Cherkasy	13	(1)

International career^{‡}
2019–2020	Ukraine U17	13	(2)
2021–2022	Ukraine U19	6	(0)
- * Club domestic league appearances and goals as of 3 June 2026 ‡ National team caps and goals as of 24 August 2023

Artur Petrovych Mykytyshyn (Ukrainian: Артур Петрович Микитишин; born 14 July 2003) is a Ukrainian professional footballer who plays as a left winger for LNZ Cherkasy.

== Career ==
Mykytyshyn is a product of Shakhtar Donetsk youth sportive school system. He made his debut for Mariupol in the Ukrainian Premier League as a substitute player in the home match against Desna Chernihiv on 1 August 2021 which ended with a loss.
