= Gabriel Eskinja =

Austrian footballer

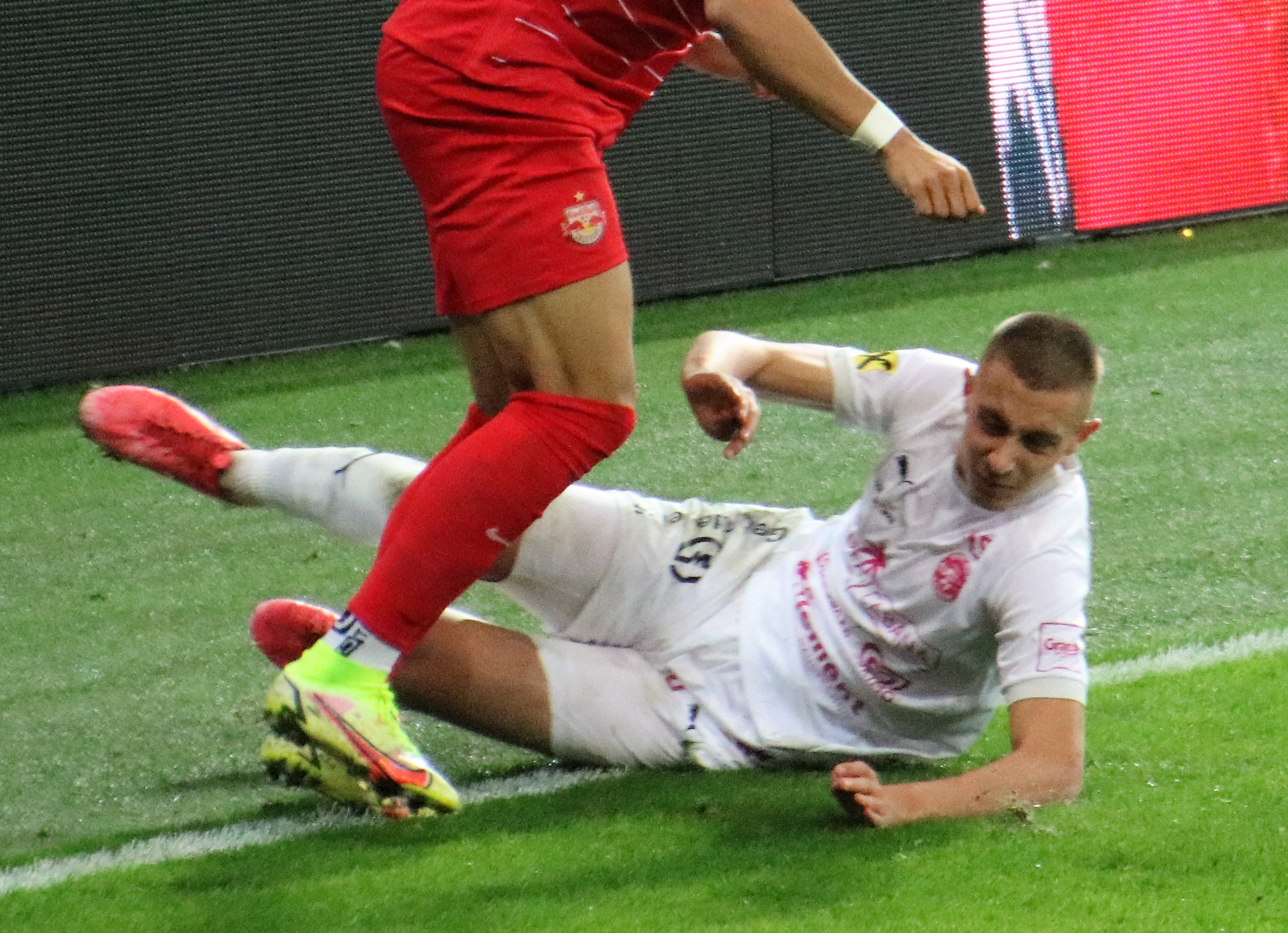
- Eskinja in 2021

Personal information
- Full name: Gabriel Eskinja
- Date of birth: 29 August 2003 (age 23)
- Place of birth: Graz, Austria
- Height: 1.91 m (6 ft 3 in)
- Position: Centre-back

Team information
- Current team: Zorya Luhansk
- Number: 4

Youth career
- 2009–2012: Gratkorn
- 2012–2015: Grazer AK
- 2015–2017: Sturm Graz
- 2017–2019: Gratkorn
- 2022: Slaven Belupo

Senior career*
Years	Team	Apps	(Gls)
2019	Gratkorn	1	(0)
2019	→ Gratkorn II	12	(1)
2019–2022	Kalsdorf	18	(0)
2019–2021	→ Kalsdorf II	15	(0)
2022–2024	Slaven Belupo	1	(0)
2023–2024	→ Zrinski Osječko 1664 (loan)	19	(0)
2024–	Zorya Luhansk	24	(0)
- * Club domestic league appearances and goals as of 3 June 2026

Gabriel Eskinja (born 29 August 2003) is an Austrian professional footballer who plays as a centre-back for Zorya Luhansk.

== Club career ==
=== Zorya Luhansk ===
Gabriel Eskinja signed for Zorya Luhansk on 4 July 2024.

== Personal life ==
His father Zoran Eskinja, who is from Croatia, is a former footballer and currently a football manager. His brother Josip Eskinja is also a footballer who plays for Croatian club Jadran Luka Ploče. His cousin Hamza Mikara is a retired footballer.
