= Ofek Biton =

Israeli footballer (born 1999)

Personal information
- Date of birth: 27 September 1999 (age 27)
- Place of birth: Lod, Israel
- Height: 1.75 m (5 ft 9 in)
- Position: Midfielder

Team information
- Current team: Hapoel Haifa
- Number: 18

Youth career
- –2011: Maccabi Tel Aviv
- 2011–2012: Sektzia Ness Ziona
- 2012–2014: Bnei Yehuda
- 2014–2019: Sektzia Ness Ziona

Senior career*
Years	Team	Apps	(Gls)
2018–2021	Sektzia Ness Ziona	38	(1)
2021–2022	Hapoel Tel Aviv	21	(3)
2022–2025	Hapoel Jerusalem	79	(12)
2025	Polissya Zhytomyr	5	(0)
2025	→ Polissya-2 Zhytomyr	1	(2)
2025–	Hapoel Haifa	20	(3)
- * Club domestic league appearances and goals as of 24 June 2026

Ofek Biton (Hebrew: אופק ביטון; born 27 September 1999) is an Israeli professional footballer who plays as a midfielder for Hapoel Haifa.

== Early life ==
Biton was born on 27 September 1999 in Lod, Israel. The son of Shlomi Biton, he is the grandson of Shalom and Tamar Biton and has a younger sister. Growing up, he was a supporter of Israeli side Hapoel Tel Aviv. At the age of five, he started playing football.

== Career ==
Biton started his career with Israeli side Sektzia Ness Ziona in 2018, where he made thirty-eight league appearances and scored one goal. In 2021, he signed for Israeli side Hapoel Tel Aviv, where he made twenty-one league appearances and scored three goals.

One year later, he signed for Israeli side Hapoel Jerusalem, where he made seventy-nine league appearances and scored twelve goals. Israeli news website One wrote in 2025 that he "became one of the club's most senior players and certainly one of their favorites, scoring double-digit goals and most importantly taking on the leadership of the team" while playing for the club. Following his stint there, he signed for Ukrainian side Polissya Zhytomyr in 2025.
