= Yvan Dibango =

Cameroonian footballer

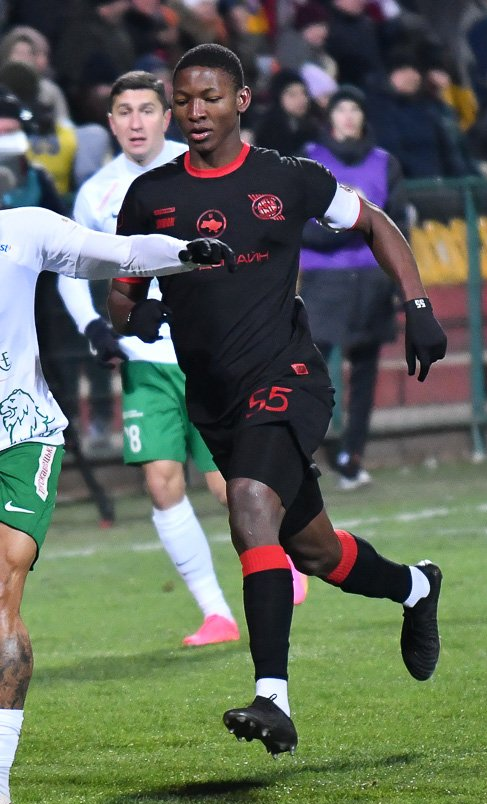

Personal information
- Full name: Junior Yvan Nyabeye Dibango
- Date of birth: 10 March 2002 (age 24)
- Place of birth: Yaoundé, Cameroon
- Height: 1.84 m (6 ft 0 in)
- Position: Defender

Team information
- Current team: LASK
- Number: 25

Youth career
- Dragon Club

Senior career*
| Years | Team | Apps | (Gls) |
| 2018–2021 | Dragon Club | | |
| 2021–2022 | Isloch Minsk Raion | 42 | (4) |
| 2022–2024 | Levadia Tallinn | 0 | (0) |
| 2022–2023 | → Kryvbas Kryvyi Rih (loan) | 41 | (1) |
| 2024–2026 | Kryvbas Kryvyi Rih | 51 | (0) |
| 2026– | LASK | 6 | (0) |

International career
| 2020–2021 | Cameroon U20 | 1 | (0) |
| 2023– | Cameroon U23 | | |
- * Club domestic league appearances and goals as of 31 October 2026

Junior Yvan Nyabeye Dibango (born 10 March 2002) is a Cameroonian professional footballer who plays for Austrian Bundesliga club LASK and the Cameroon national under-23 football team.

== International career ==
Dibango represented Cameroon at 2021 Africa U-20 Cup of Nations.

== Career statistics ==
As of match played 3 November 2026

Appearances and goals by club, season and competition
| Club | Season | League | | | Cup | | Europe | | Other | | Total | |
| Club | Season | Division | Apps | Goals | Apps | Goals | Apps | Goals | Apps | Goals | Apps | Goals |
|---|---|---|---|---|---|---|---|---|---|---|---|---|
| Isloch Minsk Raion | 2020–21 | Belarusian Premier League | 26 | 2 | 4 | 1 | — | | — | | 30 | 3 |
| Isloch Minsk Raion | 2021–22 | Belarusian Premier League | 16 | 2 | 1 | 0 | — | | — | | 17 | 2 |
| Isloch Minsk Raion | 2022–23 | Belarusian Premier League | 0 | 0 | 2 | 0 | — | | — | | 2 | 0 |
| Isloch Minsk Raion | Total | | 42 | 4 | 7 | 1 | — | | — | | 49 | 5 |
| Levadia Tallinn | 2022 | Meistriliiga | 0 | 0 | 0 | 0 | — | | — | | 0 | 0 |
| Kryvbas Kryvyi Rih (loan) | 2022–23 | Ukrainian Premier League | 23 | 0 | — | | — | | — | | 23 | 0 |
| Kryvbas Kryvyi Rih (loan) | 2023–24 | Ukrainian Premier League | 18 | 1 | 1 | 0 | — | | — | | 19 | 1 |
| Kryvbas Kryvyi Rih (loan) | Total | | 41 | 1 | 1 | 0 | — | | — | | 42 | 1 |
| Kryvbas Kryvyi Rih | 2023–24 | Ukrainian Premier League | 13 | 0 | — | | — | | — | | 13 | 0 |
| Kryvbas Kryvyi Rih | 2024–25 | Ukrainian Premier League | 19 | 0 | — | | 4 (Note: Two appearances in UEFA Europa League, two appearances in UEFA Conference League) | 0 | — | | 23 | 0 |
| Kryvbas Kryvyi Rih | 2025–26 | Ukrainian Premier League | 19 | 0 | — | | — | | — | | 19 | 0 |
| Kryvbas Kryvyi Rih | Total | | 51 | 0 | — | | 4 | 0 | — | | 55 | 0 |
| LASK | 2026–27 | Austrian Bundesliga | 6 | 0 | 3 | 0 | 4 (Note: Appearances in UEFA Champions League) | 0 | — | | 13 | 0 |
| Career total | | | 140 | 5 | 11 | 1 | 8 | 0 | 0 | 0 | 159 | 6 |

== Honours ==
Individual

- Ukrainian Premier League player of the Month: 2023–24 (July-August)
