= Oleksandr Drambayev =

Ukrainian footballer

Personal information
- Full name: Oleksandr Oleksandrovych Drambayev
- Date of birth: 21 April 2001 (age 25)
- Place of birth: Zaporizhzhia, Ukraine
- Height: 1.85 m (6 ft 1 in)
- Position: Defender

Team information
- Current team: LNZ Cherkasy
- Number: 14

Youth career
- 2011–2018: Metalurh Zaporizhzhia
- 2018–2020: Shakhtar Donetsk

Senior career*
Years	Team	Apps	(Gls)
2020–2024	Shakhtar Donetsk	0	(0)
2021–2022	→ Mariupol (loan)	24	(0)
2022–2023	→ Zulte Waregem (loan)	22	(1)
2023–2024	→ Osijek (loan)	16	(0)
2024–2025	Kryvbas Kryvyi Rih	16	(1)
2025–	LNZ Cherkasy	39	(0)

International career^{‡}
2019	Ukraine U18	1	(0)
2019	Ukraine U19	2	(0)
2021–2023	Ukraine U21	8	(0)
2024	Ukraine U23	2	(0)
2026–	Ukraine	1	(0)
- * Club domestic league appearances and goals as of 20 September 2026 ‡ National team caps and goals as of 25 September 2026

Oleksandr Oleksandrovych Drambayev (Ukrainian: Олександр Олександрович Драмбаєв; born 21 April 2001) is a Ukrainian professional footballer who plays as a defender for Ukrainian club LNZ Cherkasy and the Ukraine national team.

== Career ==
Born in Zaporizhzhia, Drambayev began his career in the local Metalurh Zaporizhzhia academy, until his transfer to the Shakhtar Donetsk academy in 2018.

He played in the Ukrainian Premier League Reserves and never made his debut for the senior Shakhtar Donetsk squad. In January 2021 Drambayev signed a half-year loan contract with Ukrainian Premier League side Mariupol and made the debut for the team as a second half-time substitution player in a losing home match against Oleksandriya on 14 February 2021.

For the 2022–23 season, Drambayev was loaned to Zulte Waregem in Belgium.

2023-24: He was Loaned out to NK Osijek in the Croatian League.

Following the 2024–25 season, Drambayev signed a four-year contract with Kryvbas Kryvyi Rih.

== International career ==
In May 2024, Drambayev was called up by Ruslan Rotan to the Ukraine Olympic football team squad to play at the 2024 Maurice Revello Tournament in France.

== Career statistics ==
=== Club ===
As of 20 September 2026

Club	Season	League			Cup		Continental		Other		Total	
Club	Season	Division	Apps	Goals	Apps	Goals	Apps	Goals	Apps	Goals	Apps	Goals
Mariupol (loan)	2020–21	Ukrainian Premier League	10	0	0	0	—		—		10	0
Mariupol (loan)	2021–22	Ukrainian Premier League	14	0	1	0	—		—		15	0
Mariupol (loan)	Total		24	0	1	0	—		—		25	0
Zulte Waregem (loan)	2022–23	Belgian Pro League	22	1	3	0	—		—		25	1
Osijek (loan)	2023–24	Croatian Football League	16	0	1	0	3 (Note: Appearances in UEFA Conference League)	0	—		20	0
Kryvbas Kryvyi Rih	2024–25	Ukrainian Premier League	16	1	1	0	4 (Note: Two appearances in UEFA Europa League, two appearances in UEFA Conference League)	0	—		21	1
LNZ Cherkasy	2024–25	Ukrainian Premier League	12	0	—		—		—		12	0
LNZ Cherkasy	2025–26	Ukrainian Premier League	20	0	2	0	—		—		22	0
LNZ Cherkasy	2026–27	Ukrainian Premier League	7	0	1	0	2	0	—		10	0
LNZ Cherkasy	Total		39	0	3	0	2	0	—		44	0
Career total			117	2	9	0	9	0	0	0	135	2

=== International ===
As of match played 25 September 2026

Appearances and goals by national team and year
National team	Year	Apps	Goals
Ukraine	2026	1	0
Total		1	0
