= Andi Hadroj =

Albanian footballer (born 1999)

Personal information
- Date of birth: 22 February 1999 (age 27)
- Place of birth: Pukë, Albania
- Height: 1.78 m (5 ft 10 in)
- Position: Right-back

Team information
- Current team: Vllaznia

Youth career
- –2014: Shkëndija Tiranë
- 2014–2018: Laçi

Senior career*
Years	Team	Apps	(Gls)
2018–2019	Laçi	6	(0)
2019–2022	Bylis	78	(4)
2022–2025	Partizani	87	(0)
2025–2026	Polissya Zhytomyr	5	(0)
2025–2026	→ Polissya-2 Zhytomyr	10	(1)
2026–	Vllaznia	0	(0)

International career^{‡}
2022–	Albania	4	(0)
- * Club domestic league appearances and goals as of 28 October 2026 ‡ National team caps and goals as of 3 June 2026

Andi Hadroj (born 22 February 1999) is an Albanian professional footballer who last played as a right-back for Albanian Kategoria Superiore club Vllaznia and the Albania national football team.

He was part of Bylis that won the 2018–19 Albanian First Division and achieved promotion to the Kategoria Superiore.

== Club career ==
Hadroj began his senior career with Laçi, making his debut in European competition on 12 July 2018 in a UEFA Europa League qualifying match against Anorthosis. He also appeared in the return leg of the two-legged fixture as Laçi bowed out of the Europa League. He later made his domestic debut in the 2018 Albanian Supercup against Skënderbeu. He would make just eleven appearances in all competitions in his first and only season with the club.

In January 2019, he joined Bylis. He made his debut for the club the following month, playing the entirety of a 1–0 league victory over Oriku. Bylis won the 2018–19 Albanian First Division and achieved promotion to the Kategoria Superiore.

In 2022, Hadroj signed for Partizani Tirana, where he made over 80 league appearances.

In January 2025, Hadroj transferred to Ukrainian club Polissya Zhytomyr, signing a three-year contract.

=== Vllaznia ===
In October 2026, Hadroj returned to the Kategoria Superiore, joining Vllaznia.

== International career ==
Hadroj made his debut for the Albania national football team in 2022 and has earned 3 caps.

== Career statistics ==
=== Club ===
As of match played 19 December 2021

Appearances and goals by club, season and competition
Club	Season	League			Cup		Continental		Other		Total	
Club	Season	Division	Apps	Goals	Apps	Goals	Apps	Goals	Apps	Goals	Apps	Goals
Laçi	2018–19	Kategoria Superiore	6	0	3 (Note: Two appearances and two goals in Albanian Cup, one appearance in Albanian Supercup)	2	2 (Note: Appearance(s) in UEFA Europa League)	0	—	—	11	2
Laçi	Total		6	0	3	2	2	0	—	—	11	2
Bylis	2018–19	Kategoria e Parë	7	1	—	—	—	—	—	—	7	1
Bylis	2019–20	Kategoria Superiore	23	0	6 (Note: Appearance(s) in Albanian Cup)	0	—	—	—	—	29	0
Bylis	2020–21	Kategoria Superiore	34	2	2	0	—	—	—	—	36	2
Bylis	2021–22	Kategoria e Parë	14	1	2	1	—	—	—	—	16	2
Bylis	Total		78	4	10	1	—	—	—	—	88	5
Career total			84	4	13	3	2	0	—	—	99	7

=== International ===
As of match played 3 June 2026

Appearances and goals by national team and year
National team	Year	Apps	Goals
Albania
Albania	2022	3	0
Albania	2026	1	0
Total		4	0
