= Rafael Fonseca (footballer) =

Portuguese footballer (born 2001)

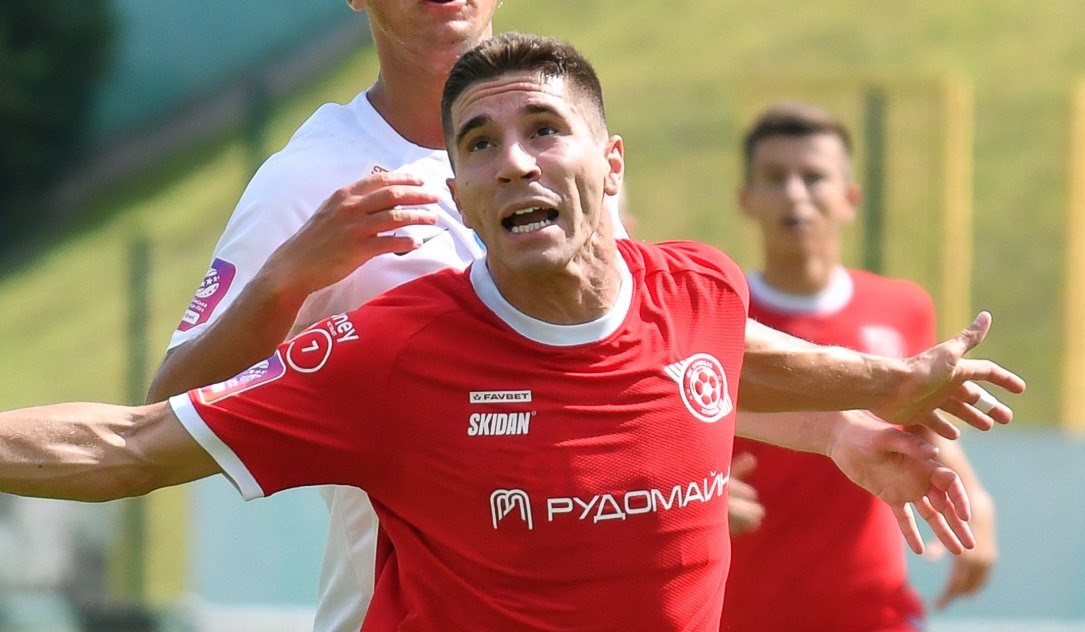

Personal information
- Full name: Rafael Alexandre Bandeira Fonseca
- Date of birth: 31 January 2001 (age 25)
- Place of birth: Almada, Portugal
- Height: 1.82 m (6 ft 0 in)
- Position: Right-back

Team information
- Current team: Chungbuk Cheongju
- Number: 25

Youth career
- 2009–2011: Almada
- 2011–2012: Cova da Piedade
- 2012–2017: Sporting
- 2017–2019: Juventus

Senior career*
Years	Team	Apps	(Gls)
2019–2020	Juventus	0	(0)
2019–2020	→ Juventus U23 (res.)	2	(0)
2020	→ Amiens B (loan)	1	(0)
2020–2022	Amiens	2	(0)
2020–2022	Amiens B	1	(0)
2022–2023	Académico de Viseu	31	(0)
2024–2025	Kryvbas Kryvyi Rih	31	(1)
2026–	Chungbuk Cheongju	14	(0)

International career^{‡}
2018–2019	Portugal U18	7	(0)
- * Club domestic league appearances and goals as of 6 August 2026 ‡ National team caps and goals as of 21:10, 11 October 2023 (UTC)

Rafael Alexandre Bandeira Fonseca (born 31 January 2001) is a Portuguese professional footballer who plays as a right-back for South Korean K League 2 club Chungbuk Cheongju.

== Career ==
Fonseca made his Serie C debut for Juventus U23 on 15 September 2019 in a game against Pro Patria.

On 9 October 2023, his contract with Liga Portugal 2 club Académico de Viseu was terminated.

On 18 November 2023, Fonseca joined Ukrainian Premier League club Kryvbas Kryvyi Rih.
