= Borys Krushynskyi =

Ukrainian footballer

Personal information
- Full name: Borys Mykolayovych Krushynskyi
- Date of birth: 10 May 2002 (age 24)
- Place of birth: Sadkovychi, Lviv Oblast, Ukraine
- Height: 1.90 m (6 ft 3 in)
- Position: Centre-back

Team information
- Current team: Polissya Zhytomyr
- Number: 55

Youth career
- 2016–2018: DYuSSh Mostyska
- 2018–2019: Lviv

Senior career*
| Years | Team | Apps | (Gls) |
| 2019–2023 | Lviv | 29 | (1) |
| 2023– | Polissya Zhytomyr | 72 | (5) |

International career^{‡}
| 2024–2025 | Ukraine U21 | 3 | (0) |
- * Club domestic league appearances and goals as of 3 June 2026 ‡ National team caps and goals as of 19 June 2025

Borys Mykolayovych Krushynskyi (Ukrainian: Борис Миколайович Крушинський; born 10 May 2002) is a Ukrainian professional footballer who plays as a centre-back Polissya Zhytomyr.

== Career ==
=== Lviv ===
Born in Sambir Raion, Krushynskyi is a product of the neighbouring Mostyska and Lviv academies. He played for Lviv in the Ukrainian Premier League Reserves and in August 2020 Krushynskyi was promoted to the senior squad. He made his debut in the Ukrainian Premier League for Lviv as a second half-time substituted player on 28 April 2021, playing in a drawing derby home match against Rukh Lviv.

=== Polissya Zhytomyr ===
On 6 January 2023 he moved to Polissya Zhytomyr.
