= João Vialle =

Brazilian footballer

Personal information
- Full name: João Victor Dall'Stella Vialle
- Date of birth: 19 August 2002 (age 24)
- Place of birth: Curitiba, Brazil
- Height: 1.84 m (6 ft 0 in)
- Position: Centre back

Team information
- Current team: Polissya Zhytomyr
- Number: 34

Youth career
- 2013–2019: Paraná
- 2019–2021: Athletico Paranaense

Senior career*
Years	Team	Apps	(Gls)
2021–2023	Athletico Paranaense	11	(0)
2023	→ Pouso Alegre (loan)	11	(0)
2024	Ituano	11	(0)
2024–	Polissya Zhytomyr	21	(0)
- * Club domestic league appearances and goals as of 19 December 2025

João Victor Dall'Stella Vialle (born 19 August 2002), known as João Vialle, is a Brazilian footballer who plays as a central defender for Polissya Zhytomyr.

== Club career ==
Born in Curitiba, Paraná, Vialle joined Athletico Paranaense's youth setup in April 2019, from Paraná Clube. He made his first team debut on 3 May 2021, coming on as a half-time substitute for Giva in a 0–1 Campeonato Paranaense away loss against Azuriz.

Vialle made his Série A debut on 9 December 2021, starting in a 1–1 away draw against Sport Recife, as his side fielded an alternative team.

== Career statistics ==
As of 10 April 2022

Club	Season	League			State league		Cup		Continental		Other		Total	
Club	Season	Division	Apps	Goals	Apps	Goals	Apps	Goals	Apps	Goals	Apps	Goals	Apps	Goals
Athletico Paranaense	2021	Série A	1	0	2	0	0	0	0	0	—		3	0
Athletico Paranaense	2021	Série A	1	0	7	0	0	0	0	0	0	0	8	0
Career total			2	0	9	0	0	0	0	0	0	0	11	0

== Honours ==
Athletico Paranaense

- Copa Sudamericana: 2021
