= Tsentralnyi Stadium (Zhytomyr) =

Multi-purpose stadium in Zhytomyr, Ukraine

Coordinates: 50°14′46″N 28°40′08″E

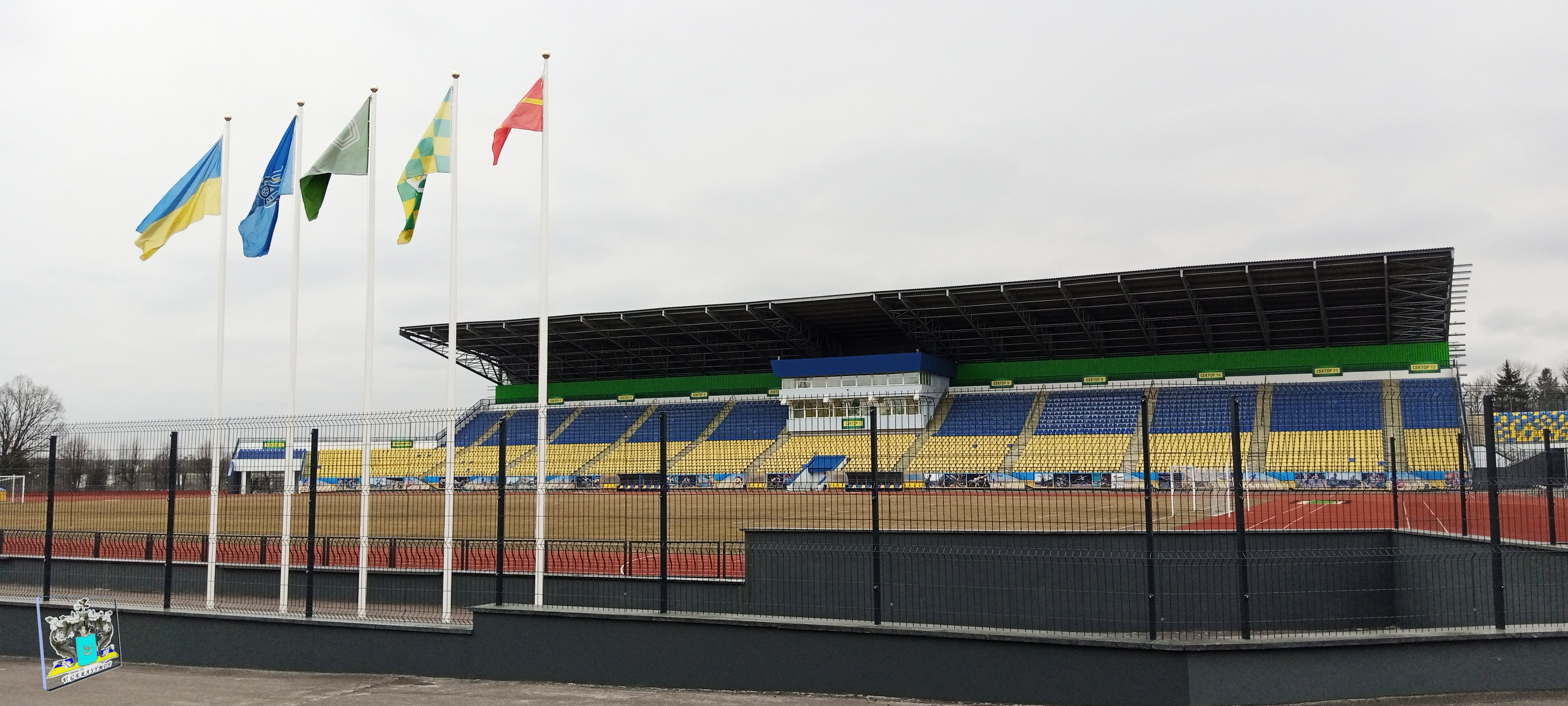
View of the stadium in 2021

Central Stadium (Ukrainian: Центральний cтадіон, Tsentralnyi stadion) is a multi-purpose stadium in Zhytomyr, Ukraine. It is the home stadium of Ukrainian Premier League side Polissya Zhytomyr. The stadium has a capacity of 5,928 spectators. Prior to the demolition of unsafe stands, the stadium could hold up to 21,928 people.

== Location ==
The city of Zhytomyr is located just south of geographical region of Polissia (Polesia) which means "Woodland". The stadium is located just south of the Zhytomyr city center in urban park area near its neighborhood called Petrovska Hora (Peter's Mount) and Teteriv River. Near the stadium is located Shoduarivskyi Park and a street Staryi Bulvar (Old Boulevard).

== History ==
The stadium was built in 1951 as part of the local Dynamo Sports Club (NKVD sports society) by method of "public construction" (a Soviet phraseology) under direction of the deputy head of regional "ispolkom" (administration). Because of that, practically all city companies (under Soviet regime all state owned) had to participate by providing their labor force. The stadium was originally named as "Dynamo" and was built in place of an old football field. At the end of construction, the stadium had stands, administration building, ticket sale stand, changing rooms, football field, running track. In winter the football field was flooded to make it an outdoor ice rink.

In 1959 the stadium was transferred to the Avanhard Republican Volunteer Sports Society and the first major renovations took place at the stadium to accommodate the football team of Avanhard that as the team of masters (Soviet terminology for professional team) was admitted to the Soviet football championship Class B.

During another sports reorganization the stadium was transferred to the Spartak Volunteer Sports Society (Komsomol sports society) and soon it was renamed in a memory of the Lenin Communist Union of Youth of Ukraine (LKSMU).

The last renovations that took place during the Soviet period were before the 1980 Summer Olympics in 1980 when at the stadium were three additional smaller stands (east, south, north).

Since 2005 the stadium was in emergency conditions due to underfinancing of the upkeep.

After the main association football club of the region withdrew from national competitions in 2005, the stadium was transferred back under the ownership of community (local government) and was renamed as the Central Stadium. It required some major renovations already in 2005.

In 2011 the regional state administration initiated renovations of the stadium and the main (west) stand in particular, which were mostly complete by March 2021. On 26 March 2021, Polissya Zhytomyr hosted Krystal Kherson in the first official match at the stadium in 16 years.

== Gallery ==
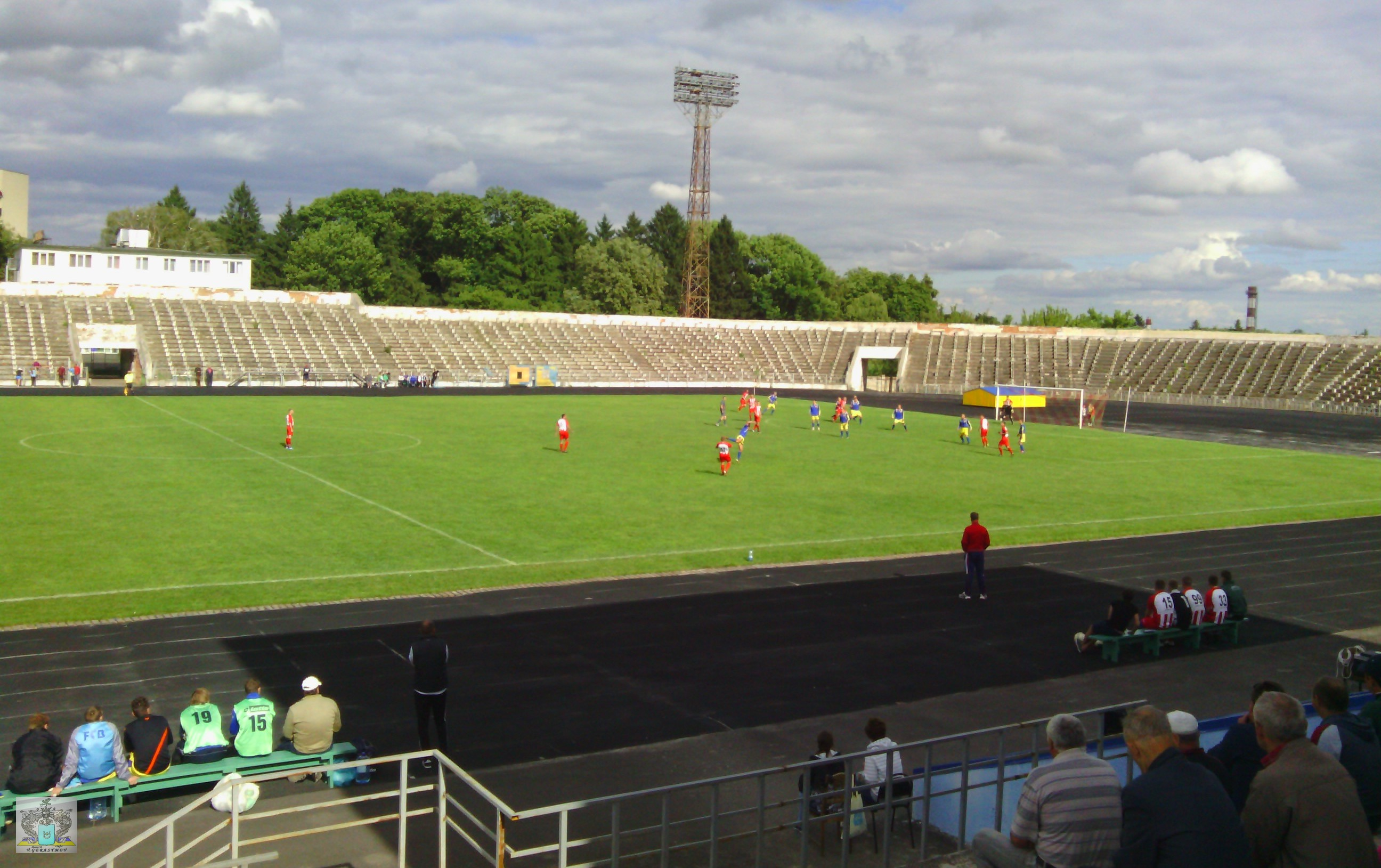
South and East stands in 2014

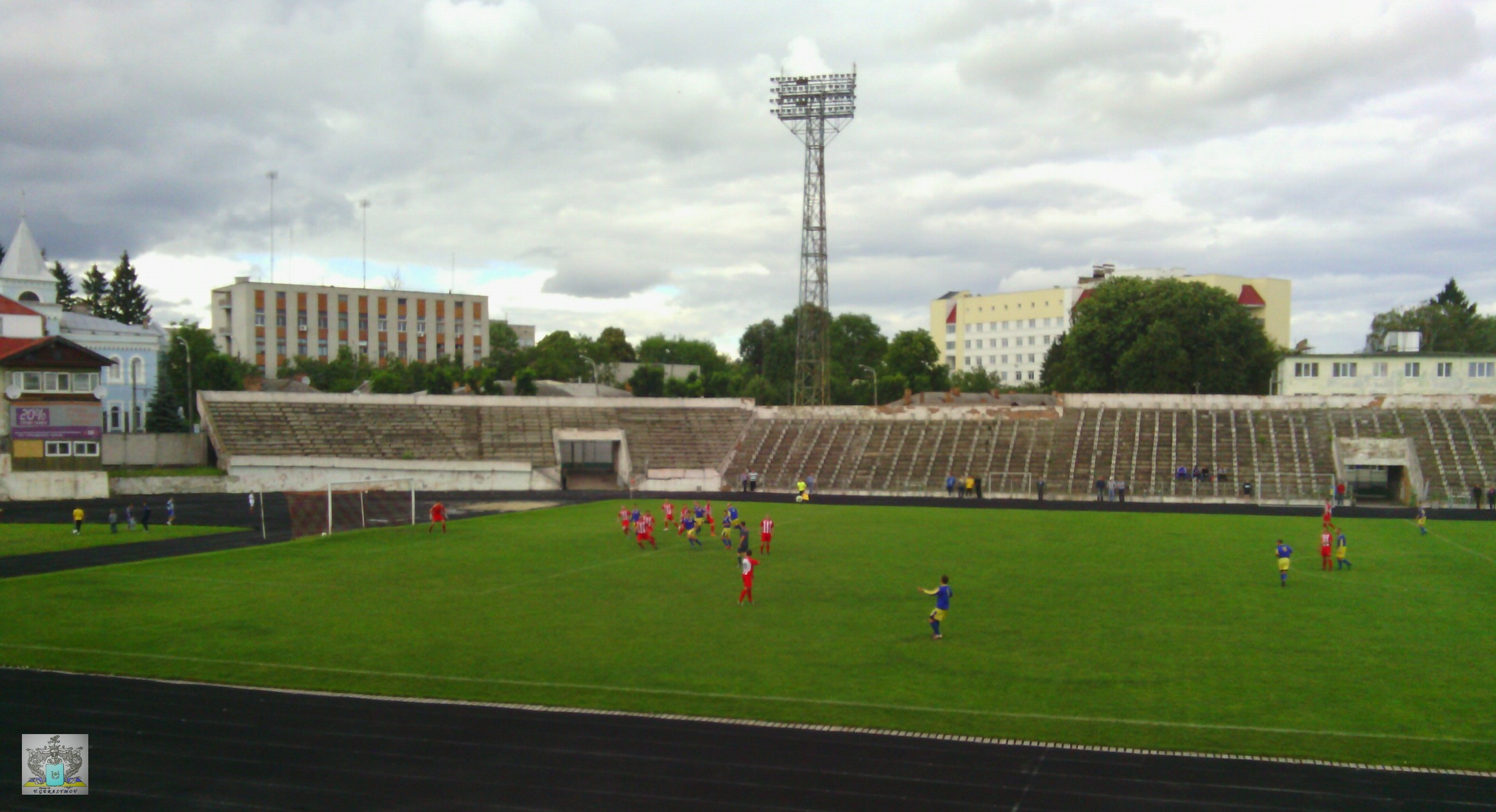
North and East stands in 2014

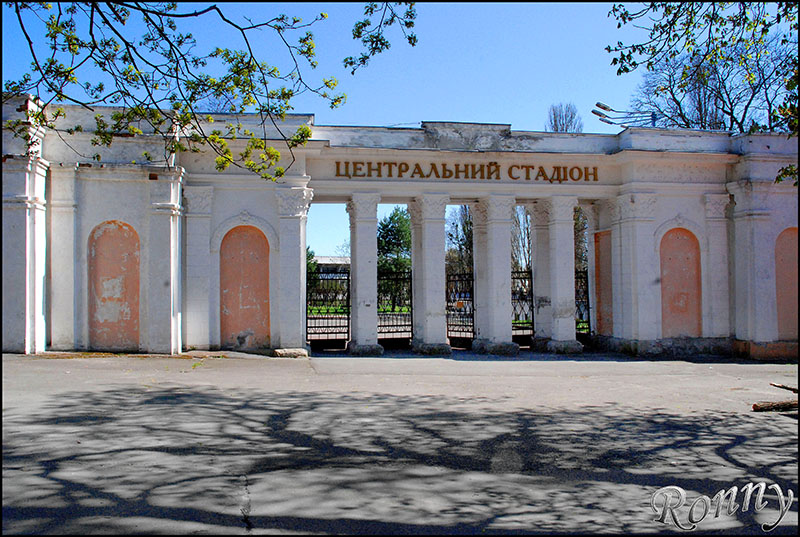
Main entrance in 2014

== See also ==
- Central Stadium
- FC Polissya Zhytomyr
