= Artem Smolyakov =

Ukrainian footballer (born 2003)

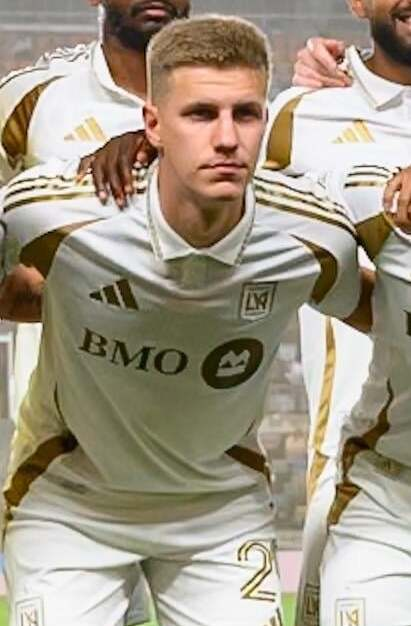
- Smolyakov with Los Angeles FC in 2025

Personal information
- Full name: Artem Hennadiyovych Smolyakov
- Date of birth: 29 May 2003 (age 23)
- Place of birth: Horlivka, Ukraine
- Height: 1.80 m (5 ft 11 in)
- Position: Defender

Team information
- Current team: Kharkiv (on loan from Los Angeles FC)
- Number: 29

Youth career
- 2016–2020: Dnipro

Senior career*
Years	Team	Apps	(Gls)
2020–2023	Inhulets Petrove	32	(2)
2023–2025	Polissya Zhytomyr	38	(2)
2025–	Los Angeles FC	33	(1)
2026–	→ Kharkiv (loan)	2	(0)

International career^{‡}
2023–2025	Ukraine U21	11	(0)
- * Club domestic league appearances and goals as of 14 August 2026 ‡ National team caps and goals as of 14 August 2026

Artem Hennadiyovych Smolyakov (Ukrainian: Артем Геннадійович Смоляков; born 29 May 2003) is a Ukrainian professional footballer who plays as a defender for Ukrainian Premier League club Kharkiv, on loan from Major League Soccer club Los Angeles FC.

== Club career ==
=== Early years ===
Smolyakov, born in Horlivka, Donetsk Oblast, is a product of the Dnipro youth sportive school system.

=== Inhulets Petrove ===
In August 2020, he signed a contract with Ukrainian Premier League side Inhulets Petrove. He made his league debut for Inhulets against Shakhtar Donetsk on 22 November 2021.

=== Polissya Zhytomyr ===
On 21 July 2023, Smolyakov moved to Polissya Zhytomyr for a fee of €150,000. During his time there, he made a total of 43 appearances in all competitions.

=== Los Angeles FC ===
On 14 February 2025, Smolyakov moved to Los Angeles FC for a reported €2 million transfer fee.

On 28 July 2026, Smolyakov was loaned out to Ukrainian Premier League side FC Kharkiv until June 2027, with an option to buy.

== International career ==
Smolyakov has made 10 appearances for the Ukraine U21 team, with his first international appearance taking place on 8 September 2023 against Germany.

== Career statistics ==
=== Club ===
As of match played 4 May 2025

Appearances and goals by club, season and competition
Club	Season	League			National cup (Note: Includes Ukrainian Cup, U.S. Open Cup)		Continental		Other		Total	
Club	Season	Division	Apps	Goals	Apps	Goals	Apps	Goals	Apps	Goals	Apps	Goals
Inhulets Petrove	2021-22	Ukrainian Premier League	2	0	0	0	—		—		2	0
Inhulets Petrove	2022-23	Ukrainian Premier League	28	2	—		—		2 (Note: Appearance(s) in Ukrainian Premier League Relegation play-offs)	0	30	2
Inhulets Petrove	Total		30	2	0	0	—		2	0	32	2
Polissya Zhytomyr	2023-24	Ukrainian Premier League	21	1	3	0	—		—		24	1
Polissya Zhytomyr	2024-25	Ukrainian Premier League	17	1	1	0	1 (Note: Appearance(s) in UEFA Europa Conference League)	0	—		19	1
Polissya Zhytomyr	Total		38	2	4	0	1	0	—		43	2
Los Angeles FC	2025	MLS	6	1	0	0	0	0	—		6	1
Career total			74	5	4	0	1	0	2	0	81	5
