= Central Stadium =

Central Stadium may refer to:

== Azerbaijan ==
- Ujar Central Stadium, see list of football stadiums in Azerbaijan

== Belarus ==
- Central Stadium (Gomel)
- Central Stadium (Rechitsa)

== East Germany ==
- Central Stadium (Leipzig, GDR)

== Georgia ==
- Central Stadium (Tbilisi)

== India ==
- Central Stadium (Thiruvananthapuram)

== Kazakhstan ==
- Central Stadium (Aktobe)
- Almaty Central Stadium
- Kostanay Central Stadium
- Pavlodar Central Stadium
- Taraz Central Stadium

== Poland ==
- Bronisław Malinowski Central Stadium

== Russia ==
- Central Stadium (Astrakhan)
- Central Stadium (Kazan)
- Central Stadium (Krasnoyarsk)
- Central Stadium (Murmansk)
- Central Stadium (Oryol)
- Central Stadium (Pyatigorsk)
- Sochi Central Stadium
- Central Stadium (Volgograd)
- Central Stadium (Yekaterinburg)
- Rashid Aushev Central Stadium, Nazran

== Tajikistan ==
- Central Stadium (Dushanbe)

== See also ==
- Central City Stadium (disambiguation), various Ukrainian stadiums
