= Talles Costa =

Brazilian footballer

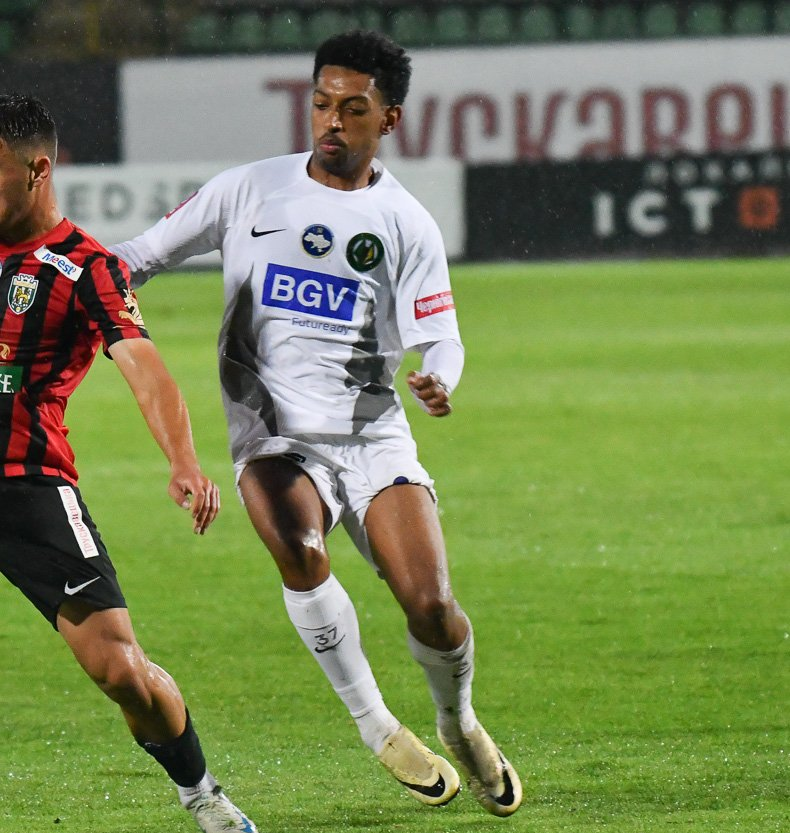

Personal information
- Full name: Talles Macedo Toledo Costa
- Date of birth: 2 August 2002 (age 24)
- Place of birth: São Paulo, Brazil
- Height: 1.73 m (5 ft 8 in)
- Position: Midfielder

Team information
- Current team: Polissya Zhytomyr
- Number: 6

Youth career
- 2013–2020: São Paulo

Senior career*
Years	Team	Apps	(Gls)
2021–2023	São Paulo	36	(0)
2024–	Polissya Zhytomyr	37	(0)

International career
2018–2019	Brazil U17	5	(0)
- * Club domestic league appearances and goals as of 18 December 2025

Talles Macedo Toledo Costa (born 2 August 2002), known as Talles Costa or simply Talles, is a Brazilian professional footballer who plays as a midfielder for Polissya Zhytomyr.

== Club career ==
Born in São Paulo, Talles joined São Paulo FC's youth setup in June 2013, at the age of 11. He made his first team debut on 14 April 2021, starting in a 3–2 Campeonato Paulista home win against Guarani.

On 4 February 2024, Talles joined Ukrainian club Polissya Zhytomyr.

== Career statistics ==
As of match played 9 May 2025

Club	Season	League			State league		National cup		Continental		Other		Total	
Club	Season	Division	Apps	Goals	Apps	Goals	Apps	Goals	Apps	Goals	Apps	Goals	Apps	Goals
São Paulo	2019	Série A	0	0	0	0	0	0	0	0	—		0	0
São Paulo	2021	Série A	7	0	4 (Note: Appearance(s) in Campeonato Paulista)	0	3	0	2 (Note: Appearance(s) in Copa Libertadores)	0	—		16	0
São Paulo	2022	Série A	12	0	3	0	4	0	7 (Note: Appearance(s) in Copa Sudamericana)	1	—		26	1
São Paulo	2023	Série A	7	0	3	0	0	0	0	0	—		10	0
São Paulo	Total		26	0	10	0	7	0	9	1	—		52	1
Polissya Zhytomyr	2023-24	Ukrainian Premier League	12	0	—		0	0	—		—		12	0
Polissya Zhytomyr	2024-25	Ukrainian Premier League	14	0	—		2	0	2 (Note: Appearance(s) in UEFA Europa Conference League)	0	—		18	0
Polissya Zhytomyr	2025-26	Ukrainian Premier League	4	0	—		0	0	5	1	—		9	1
Polissya Zhytomyr	Total		30	0	—		2	0	7	1	—		39	1
Career total			56	0	10	0	9	0	16	2	—		91	2

== Honours ==
=== Club ===
São Paulo

- Campeonato Paulista: 2021
- Copa do Brasil: 2023

=== International ===
Brazil U17

- FIFA U-17 World Cup: 2019
