= List of Ukrainian football transfers winter 2023–24 =

This is a list of Ukrainian football transfers winter 2023–24 which stretches from 24 January to 12 March 2024.

== Ukrainian Premier League ==
=== Chornomorets Odesa ===
In:

No.	Pos.	Nation	Player
—	DF	UKR	Vladyslav Shapoval (from Polissya Zhytomyr)
—	GK	UKR	Yan Vichnyi (from Nyva Vinnytsia)

Out:

No.	Pos.	Nation	Player
—	FW	UKR	Vladyslav Vakula (loan return to Polissya Zhytomyr)

=== Dnipro-1 ===
In:

No.	Pos.	Nation	Player
—	MF	UKR	Oleh Ocheretko (on loan from Shakhtar Donetsk)

Out:

No.	Pos.	Nation	Player
—	DF	ARG	Emiliano Purita (to Patronato)
—	FW	BRA	Felipe Pires (to Torpedo Kutaisi)
—	FW	BRA	Wendell (to Polissia Zhytomyr)
—	DF	UKR	Vasyl Kravets (to Polissia Zhytomyr)
—	MF	BRA	Bill (on loan to Nova Iguaçu)
—	DF	UKR	Oleksandr Kapliyenko (loan return to Metalist Kharkiv)

=== Dynamo Kyiv ===
In:

No.	Pos.	Nation	Player
—	MF	NED	Justin Lonwijk (loan return from Anderlecht)
—	FW	LUX	Gerson Rodrigues (loan return from Sivasspor)

Out:

No.	Pos.	Nation	Player
—	MF	NED	Justin Lonwijk (on loan to Fortuna Sittard)
—	MF	MKD	Reshat Ramadani (on loan to Shkëndija)
—	FW	LUX	Gerson Rodrigues (on loan to Slovan Bratislava)

=== Kolos Kovalivka ===
In:

No.	Pos.	Nation	Player
—	DF	UKR	Vyacheslav Stavnychyi (loan return from Inhulets Petrove)
—	MF	UKR	Dmytro Topalov (on loan from Shakhtar Donetsk)

Out:

No.	Pos.	Nation	Player

=== Kryvbas Kryvyi Rih ===
In:

No.	Pos.	Nation	Player
—	DF	POR	Rafael Fonseca (from Académico de Viseu)
—	DF	GLP	Nathanaël Saintini (on loan from Sion)
—	MF	UKR	Yehor Tverdokhlib (from Mynai)
—	MF	UKR	Artur Mykytyshyn (from Oleksandriya)

Out:

No.	Pos.	Nation	Player
—	FW	UKR	Danylo Honcharuk (loan return to Shakhtar Donetsk)
—	MF	UKR	Vladyslav Semotyuk (loan to Mynai)
—	FW	UKR	Denys Ustymenko (loan to Mynai)
—	FW	UKR	Oleksiy Khoblenko (to LNZ Cherkasy)
—	MF	UKR	Denys Shevchenko (free agent)

=== LNZ Cherkasy ===
In:

No.	Pos.	Nation	Player
—	FW	UKR	Oleksiy Khoblenko (from Kryvbas Kryvyi Rih)
—	DF	UKR	Oleksandr Kapliyenko (from Metalist Kharkiv)

Out:

No.	Pos.	Nation	Player

=== Metalist 1925 Kharkiv ===
In:

No.	Pos.	Nation	Player

Out:

No.	Pos.	Nation	Player

=== Mynai ===
In:

No.	Pos.	Nation	Player
—	MF	UKR	Vladyslav Vakula (free agent (previously Polissia))
—	MF	UKR	Vladyslav Semotyuk (on loan from Kryvbas Kryvyi Rih)
—	FW	UKR	Denys Ustymenko (on loan from Kryvbas Kryvyi Rih)

Out:

No.	Pos.	Nation	Player
—	MF	UKR	Serhiy Panasenko (to Inhulets Petrove)
—	MF	UKR	Yehor Tverdokhlib (to Kryvbas Kryvyi Rih)
—	DF	UKR	Andriy Buleza (loan return to Shakhtar Donetsk)

=== Obolon Kyiv ===
In:

No.	Pos.	Nation	Player
—	MF	UKR	Yevhen Zaporozhets (from Inhulets Petrove)

Out:

No.	Pos.	Nation	Player

=== Oleksandriya ===
In:

No.	Pos.	Nation	Player

Out:

No.	Pos.	Nation	Player
—	MF	UKR	Artur Mykytyshyn (to Kryvbas Kryvyi Rih)

=== Polissya Zhytomyr ===
In:

No.	Pos.	Nation	Player
—	FW	BRA	Wendell (from Dnipro-1)
—	DF	UKR	Vasyl Kravets (from Dnipro-1)
—	FW	UKR	Denys Ndukve (from Zviahel)
—	MF	BRA	Talles Costa (from São Paulo)
—	DF	UKR	Bohdan Mykhaylichenko (from Dinamo Zagreb)
—	MF	CGO	Borel Tomandzoto (from Saint-Éloi Lupopo)
—	FW	UKR	Vladyslav Vakula (loan return from Chornomorets Odesa)
—	FW	FRA	Yassin Fortuné (on loan from Sion)

Out:

No.	Pos.	Nation	Player
—	MF	UKR	Vladyslav Ohirya (free agent)
—	MF	UKR	Vladyslav Vakula (to Mynai)
—	DF	UKR	Vladyslav Shapoval (to Chornomorets Odesa)
—	FW	BRA	Arielson (loan return to Cruzeiro)
—	FW	UKR	Denis Yanakov (on loan to Veres Rivne)
—	FW	UKR	Dmytro Shastal (on loan to Veres Rivne)
—	FW	BRA	Wendell (on loan to Zviahel)
—	MF	CGO	Borel Tomandzoto (on loan to Zviahel)
—	MF	UKR	Yevheniy Morozko (on loan to Veres Rivne)

=== Rukh Lviv ===
In:

No.	Pos.	Nation	Player

Out:

No.	Pos.	Nation	Player
—	MF	UKR	Maryan Mysyk (to Livyi Bereh Kyiv)

=== Shakhtar Donetsk ===
In:

No.	Pos.	Nation	Player
—	MF	BRA	Marlon Gomes (from Vasco da Gama)
—	MF	BRA	Kevin (from Palmeiras)
—	DF	GEO	Luka Latsabidze (from Dinamo Tbilisi)
—	FW	UKR	Danylo Honcharuk (loan return from Kryvbas Kryvyi Rih)
—	DF	UKR	Andriy Buleza (loan return from Mynai)

Out:

No.	Pos.	Nation	Player
—	FW	UKR	Danylo Honcharuk (to Bukovyna Chernivtsi)
—	FW	UKR	Bohdan Vyunnyk (to Lechia Gdańsk)
—	MF	UKR	Oleh Ocheretko (on loan to Dnipro-1)
—	DF	UKR	Andriy Buleza (on loan to Karpaty Lviv)
—	DF	UKR	Eduard Kozik (on loan to Karpaty Lviv)
—	MF	UKR	Dmytro Topalov (on loan to Kolos Kovalivka)
—	MF	ECU	Denil Castillo (on loan to Partizan)

=== Veres Rivne ===
In:

No.	Pos.	Nation	Player
—	FW	UKR	Denis Yanakov (on loan from Polissia Zhytomyr)
—	FW	UKR	Dmytro Shastal (on loan from Polissia Zhytomyr)
—	MF	UKR	Yevheniy Morozko (on loan from Polissia Zhytomyr)

Out:

No.	Pos.	Nation	Player
—	MF	UKR	Danyil Khondak (on loan to Chernihiv)

=== Vorskla Poltava ===
In:

No.	Pos.	Nation	Player

Out:

No.	Pos.	Nation	Player

=== Zorya Luhansk ===
In:

No.	Pos.	Nation	Player

Out:

No.	Pos.	Nation	Player
—	MF	UKR	Yuriy Tlumak (to Karpaty Lviv)

== Ukrainian First League ==
=== Ahrobiznes Volochysk ===
In:

No.	Pos.	Nation	Player

Out:

No.	Pos.	Nation	Player

=== Bukovyna Chernivtsi ===
In:

No.	Pos.	Nation	Player
—	FW	UKR	Danylo Honcharuk (from Shakhtar Donetsk)

Out:

No.	Pos.	Nation	Player

=== FC Chernihiv ===
In:

No.	Pos.	Nation	Player
—	MF	UKR	Dmytro Sakhno (from Viktoriya Sumy)
—	MF	UKR	Bohdan Lianskoronskyi (from Kudrivka)
—	MF	UKR	Oleh Osypenko (on loan from Inhulets Petrove)
—	MF	UKR	Danyil Khondak (on loan from Veres Rivne)
—	FW	UKR	Daniil Volskyi (from Nyva Ternopil)

Out:

No.	Pos.	Nation	Player
—	GK	UKR	Yehor Kolomiets (Relisead)
—	MF	UKR	Anatoliy Romanchenko (to Inhulets Petrove)
—	MF	UKR	Maksym Serdyuk (to Livyi Bereh Kyiv)
—	MF	UKR	Stanislav Khomych (Relisead)
—	MF	UKR	Artem Strilets (Relisead)

=== Dinaz Vyshhorod ===
In:

No.	Pos.	Nation	Player

Out:

No.	Pos.	Nation	Player

=== Epitsentr Kamianets-Podilskyi ===
In:

No.	Pos.	Nation	Player

Out:

No.	Pos.	Nation	Player

=== Hirnyk-Sport Horishni Plavni ===
In:

No.	Pos.	Nation	Player

Out:

No.	Pos.	Nation	Player

=== Inhulets Petrove ===
In:

No.	Pos.	Nation	Player
—	MF	UKR	Anatoliy Romanchenko (from Chernihiv)
—	MF	UKR	Serhiy Panasenko (from Mynai)
—	MF	UKR	Valeriy Sad (from Metalurh Zaporizhia)

Out:

No.	Pos.	Nation	Player
—	MF	UKR	Oleh Osypenko (on loan to Chernihiv)
—	DF	UKR	Vyacheslav Stavnychyi (loan return to Kolos Kovalivka)
—	MF	UKR	Yevhen Zaporozhets (to Obolon Kyiv)

=== Karpaty Lviv ===
In:

No.	Pos.	Nation	Player
—	MF	UKR	Yuriy Tlumak (free agent (previously Zorya))
—	FW	BRA	Arielson (on loan from Cruzeiro)
—	DF	UKR	Andriy Buleza (on loan from Shakhtar Donetsk)
—	DF	UKR	Eduard Kozik (on loan from Shakhtar Donetsk)

Out:

No.	Pos.	Nation	Player
—	MF	BRA	Eduardo Soares (free agent)
—	MF	UKR	Kyrylo Matveyev (on loan to Kudrivka-Nyva)
—	DF	UKR	Bohdan Porokh (early loan return to Metalist Kharkiv)
—	FW	BRA	Cristhyan (early loan return to Ponte Preta)

=== Khust ===
In:

No.	Pos.	Nation	Player

Out:

No.	Pos.	Nation	Player

=== Kremin Kremenchuk ===
In:

No.	Pos.	Nation	Player

Out:

No.	Pos.	Nation	Player

=== Kudrivka-Nyva ===
In:

No.	Pos.	Nation	Player
—	MF	UKR	Kyrylo Matveyev (on loan from Karpaty Lviv)

Out:

No.	Pos.	Nation	Player

=== Livyi Bereh Kyiv ===
In:

No.	Pos.	Nation	Player
—	GK	UKR	Maksym Mekhaniv (from Nyva Ternopil)
2	DF	UKR	Oleh Sokolov (from Nyva Ternopil)
6	DF	BRA	Sidney Silva Santos (from Taquaritinga)
79	MF	UKR	Maksym Serdyuk (from Chernihiv)
7	MF	UKR	Maryan Mysyk (from Rukh Lviv)

Out:

No.	Pos.	Nation	Player
—	MF	UKR	Denys Holub (free agent)
—	MF	UKR	Yuriy Repeta (free agent)
—	MF	UKR	Oleh Vakulenko (to Druzhba Myrivka)
—	MF	UKR	Oleh Yankovskyi (free agent)
—	GK	UKR	Oleksandr Chernyatynskyi (free agent)

=== FSC Mariupol ===
In:

No.	Pos.	Nation	Player

Out:

No.	Pos.	Nation	Player

=== Metalist Kharkiv ===
In:

No.	Pos.	Nation	Player
—	DF	UKR	Bohdan Porokh (loan return from Karpaty Lviv)
—	DF	UKR	Oleksandr Kapliyenko (loan return from Dnipro-1)

Out:

No.	Pos.	Nation	Player
—	DF	UKR	Oleksandr Kapliyenko (to LNZ Cherkasy)

=== Metalurh Zaporizhzhia ===
In:

No.	Pos.	Nation	Player

Out:

No.	Pos.	Nation	Player
—	MF	UKR	Valeriy Sad (to Inhulets Petrove)

=== Nyva Ternopil ===
In:

No.	Pos.	Nation	Player

Out:

No.	Pos.	Nation	Player
—	GK	UKR	Maksym Mekhaniv (from Nyva Ternopil)
—	DF	UKR	Oleh Sokolov (from Nyva Ternopil)
—	FW	UKR	Daniil Volskyi (to Chernihiv)

=== Podillia Khmelnytskyi ===
In:

No.	Pos.	Nation	Player

Out:

No.	Pos.	Nation	Player

=== Poltava ===
In:

No.	Pos.	Nation	Player

Out:

No.	Pos.	Nation	Player

=== Prykarpattia Ivano-Frankivsk ===
In:

No.	Pos.	Nation	Player

Out:

No.	Pos.	Nation	Player

=== Viktoriya Sumy ===
In:

No.	Pos.	Nation	Player

Out:

No.	Pos.	Nation	Player

== Ukrainian Second League ==
=== SC Chaika ===
In:

No.	Pos.	Nation	Player

Out:

No.	Pos.	Nation	Player

=== Druzhba Myrivka ===
In:

No.	Pos.	Nation	Player
70	MF	UKR	Oleh Vakulenko (from Livyi Bereh Kyiv)

Out:

No.	Pos.	Nation	Player

=== Karpaty-2 Lviv ===
In:

No.	Pos.	Nation	Player

Out:

No.	Pos.	Nation	Player

=== Kremin-2 Kremenchuk ===
In:

No.	Pos.	Nation	Player

Out:

No.	Pos.	Nation	Player

=== FC Kudrivka ===
In:

No.	Pos.	Nation	Player
—	MF	UKR	Ivan Sklyarenko (from Druzhba Myrivka)
—	MF	UKR	Oleksandr Yevtushenko (from Olimpiya Savyntsi)

Out:

No.	Pos.	Nation	Player
—	MF	UKR	Bohdan Lianskoronskyi (to Chernihiv)
—	MF	UKR	Denys Skepskyi (to Lisne)
—	DF	UKR	Oleksandr Rudenko (to Skala Stryi)
—	MF	UKR	Mykola Syrash (to Khust)
—	DF	UKR	Myroslav Serdyuk (to Nyva Buzova)
—	FW	UKR	Dmytro Kulyk (to Nyva Buzova)
—	MF	UKR	Yevhen Chepurnenko (to Nyva Buzova)
—	MF	UKR	Bogdan Lyanskoronskyi (to Chernihiv)
—	FW	UKR	Volodymyr Koval (to Lisne)
—	FW	UKR	Pavlo Shchedrakov (Retired)

=== Lokomotyv Kyiv ===
In:

No.	Pos.	Nation	Player

Out:

No.	Pos.	Nation	Player

=== Metalurh-2 Zaporizhzhia ===
In:

No.	Pos.	Nation	Player

Out:

No.	Pos.	Nation	Player

=== Nyva Vinnytsia ===
In:

No.	Pos.	Nation	Player

Out:

No.	Pos.	Nation	Player
—	GK	UKR	Yan Vichnyi (to Chornomorets Odesa)

=== Real Pharma Odesa ===
In:

No.	Pos.	Nation	Player

Out:

No.	Pos.	Nation	Player

=== Rukh-2 Lviv ===
In:

No.	Pos.	Nation	Player

Out:

No.	Pos.	Nation	Player

=== Skala 1911 Stryi ===
In:

No.	Pos.	Nation	Player
—	DF	UKR	Oleksandr Rudenko (from Kudrivka)

Out:

No.	Pos.	Nation	Player

=== UCSA Tarasivka ===
In:

No.	Pos.	Nation	Player

Out:

No.	Pos.	Nation	Player

=== Trostianets ===
In:

No.	Pos.	Nation	Player

Out:

No.	Pos.	Nation	Player

=== Zvyahel ===
In:

No.	Pos.	Nation	Player
—	FW	BRA	Wendell Gabriel (on loan from Polissia Zhytomyr)
—	MF	CGO	Borel Tomandzoto Beliada (on loan from Polissia Zhytomyr)

Out:

No.	Pos.	Nation	Player
—	FW	UKR	Denys Ndukve (to Polissia Zhytomyr)

== Omitted teams from the Ukrainian Premier League ==
=== Desna Chernihiv ===
In:

No.	Pos.	Nation	Player

Out:

No.	Pos.	Nation	Player

=== Mariupol ===
In:

No.	Pos.	Nation	Player

Out:

No.	Pos.	Nation	Player

== Omitted teams from the Ukrainian First League ==
=== Kramatorsk ===
In:

No.	Pos.	Nation	Player

Out:

No.	Pos.	Nation	Player

=== Lviv ===
In:

No.	Pos.	Nation	Player

Out:

No.	Pos.	Nation	Player

=== Skoruk Tomakivka ===
In:

No.	Pos.	Nation	Player

Out:

No.	Pos.	Nation	Player

=== VPK-Ahro Shevchenkivka ===
In:

No.	Pos.	Nation	Player

Out:

No.	Pos.	Nation	Player

=== Uzhhorod ===
In:

No.	Pos.	Nation	Player

Out:

No.	Pos.	Nation	Player

== Omitted teams from the Ukrainian Second League ==
=== AFSC Kyiv ===
In:

No.	Pos.	Nation	Player

Out:

No.	Pos.	Nation	Player

=== Balkany Zorya ===
In:

No.	Pos.	Nation	Player

Out:

No.	Pos.	Nation	Player

=== Enerhiya Nova Kakhovka ===
In:

No.	Pos.	Nation	Player

Out:

No.	Pos.	Nation	Player

=== Karpaty Halych ===
In:

No.	Pos.	Nation	Player

Out:

No.	Pos.	Nation	Player

=== Krystal Kherson ===
In:

No.	Pos.	Nation	Player

Out:

No.	Pos.	Nation	Player

=== Lyubomyr Stavyshche ===
In:

No.	Pos.	Nation	Player

Out:

No.	Pos.	Nation	Player

=== Mukachevo ===
In:

No.	Pos.	Nation	Player

Out:

No.	Pos.	Nation	Player

=== MFC Mykolaiv ===
In:

No.	Pos.	Nation	Player

Out:

No.	Pos.	Nation	Player

=== Sumy ===
In:

No.	Pos.	Nation	Player

Out:

No.	Pos.	Nation	Player

=== Tavriya Simferopol ===
In:

No.	Pos.	Nation	Player

Out:

No.	Pos.	Nation	Player
