= 2023–24 FC Shakhtar Donetsk season =

Shakhtar Donetsk
2023–24 season
- Chairman: Rinat Akhmetov
- Manager: Patrick van Leeuwen (until 16 October); Darijo Srna (Acting Head Coach) (16-24 October); Marino Pušić (from 24 October)
- Stadium: Arena Lviv (League); Volksparkstadion (Europe)
- Premier League: 1st (champions)
- Ukrainian Cup: Winners
- UEFA Champions League: Group stage
- UEFA Europa League: Knockout round play-offs vs Marseille
- Top goalscorer: League: Danylo Sikan (10); All: Danylo Sikan (16)
- Highest home attendance: 1,317 vs Dynamo Kyiv (11 May 2024)
- Lowest home attendance: 410 vs Mynai (12 March 2024)
- Average home league attendance: 350 (11 May 2024)
Home colours	Away colours	Third colours

The 2023–24 season was FC Shakhtar Donetsk's 33rd season in existence and the club's 25th consecutive season in the top flight of Ukrainian football. In addition to the domestic league, Shakhtar Donetsk participated in the Ukrainian Cup and the UEFA Champions League. The season covered the period from 1 July 2023 to 30 June 2024.

== Season events ==
On 24 April 2023, Shakhtar announced that they'd signed Denil Castillo to a five-year contract from Liga de Quito, commencing 1 July 2023.

On 1 July, Shakhtar confirmed the departure of manager Igor Jovićević, with Patrick van Leeuwen being appointed as his replacement on 3 July.

On 19 July, Shakhtar announced the signing of Pedrinho on a contract until 30 June 2028, from Athletico Paranaense. Two day later, 21 July, Shakhtar announced the signing of Newerton, also on a contract until 30 June 2028, from São Paulo.

On 31 July, Shakhtar announced the signing of Stav Lemkin from Hapoel Tel Aviv and Eguinaldo from Vasco da Gama, both on contracts until 30 June 2028.

On 4 August, Shakhtar announced the signing of free-agent Dmytro Chyhrynskyi on a contract until the end of the season.

On 6 August, Andriy Pyatov played his last game for Shakhtar, a friendly against Tottenham Hotspur, and announced his retirement from football.

On 10 August, Anatoliy Trubin left Shakhtar to sign for Benfica for an undisclosed fee.

On 22 August, Shakhtar announced the signing of Irakli Azarovi from Red Star Belgrade on a contract until 30 June 2028.

On 29 August, Danylo Sikan extended his contract with Shakhtar until 30 June 2028.

On 1 September, Shakhtar announced the season-long loan signing of Novatus Miroshi from Zulte Waregem.

On 2 September, Shakhtar announced the signing of free-agent Artur Rudko on a contract until the end of the season.

On 5 September, Shakhtar announced that Andriy Totovytskyi had joined Kolos Kovalivka on loan for the season, whilst Maryan Faryna had joined Metalist 1925 Kharkiv on a similar deal and Andriy Boryachuk had joined Metalist 1925 Kharkiv on a permeant deal.

On 16 October, Patrick van Leeuwen left his role as Head Coach of Shakhtar, with Darijo Srna taking over as Acting Head Coach.

On 24 October, Marino Pušić was announced as the new Head Coach of Shakhtar, with Mario Stanić being appointed as his assistant the following day.

On 12 January, Shakhtar announced that they had signed a new contract with Artem Bondarenko until the end of 2028.

On 19 January, Shakhtar announced the signing of Kevin from Palmeiras on a contract until the end of 2028.

On 20 January, Shakhtar announced that they had signed a new contract with Taras Stepanenko until the summer of 2025.

On 21 January, Partizan announced the loan signing of Denil Castillo from Shakhtar until the end of the season.

On 26 January, Shakhtar announced the signing of Marlon Gomes from Vasco da Gama on a contract until the end of 2028.

On 1 February, Shakhtar announced that Heorhiy Sudakov had extended his contract with the club until the end of 2028.

On 1 February, Shakhtar announced that Oleh Ocheretko had extended his contract with the club until the end of 2027.

On 4 February, Shakhtar announced the signing of Luka Latsabidze from Dinamo Tbilisi on a contract until the end of 2028.

On 5 February, Shakhtar announced academy graduate Viktor Tsukanov had signed a contract with the club until the end of 2028 following his 18th birthday.

On 6 February, Shakhtar announced that Oleh Ocheretko would join Dnipro-1 on loan for the remainder of the season, and that midfielder Pedrinho had signed a new contract with the club until 30 June 2029.

On 6 March, Lechia Gdańsk announced the signing of Bohdan Vyunnyk, after the player had told Shakhtar of his decision to terminate his contract on 22 February.

On 30 April, Kevin Kelsy joined FC Cincinnati on loan until 31 December 2024, with an option for the move to be permanent.

== Squad ==
As of match played 25 May 2024

Number	Player	Nationality	Position	Date of birth (age)	Signed from	Signed in	Contract ends	Apps.	Goals
Goalkeepers
1	Artur Rudko	(Ukraine)	GK	7 May 1992 (aged 32)	Unattached	2023	2024	1	0
12	Tymur Puzankov	(Ukraine)	GK	4 March 2003 (aged 21)	Academy	2021		0	0
31	Dmytro Riznyk	(Ukraine)	GK	30 January 1999 (aged 25)	Vorskla Poltava	2023	2028	39	0
48	Denys Tvardovskyi	(Ukraine)	GK	13 June 2003 (aged 20)	Academy	2023		2	0
Defenders
3	Stav Lemkin	(Israel)	DF	2 April 2003 (aged 21)	Hapoel Tel Aviv	2023	2028	5	0
5	Valeriy Bondar	(Ukraine)	DF	27 February 1999 (aged 25)	Academy	2019		101	2
13	Giorgi Gocholeishvili	(Georgia (country))	DF	14 February 2001 (aged 23)	Saburtalo Tbilisi	2023	2027	36	1
16	Irakli Azarovi	(Georgia (country))	DF	21 February 2002 (aged 22)	Red Star Belgrade	2023	2028	32	0
19	Dmytro Chyhrynskyi	(Ukraine)	DF	7 November 1986 (aged 37)	Unattached	2023	2024	193	16
22	Mykola Matviyenko	(Ukraine)	DF	2 May 1996 (aged 28)	Academy	2015	2027	99	13
23	Pedrinho	(Brazil)	DF	11 July 2002 (aged 21)	Athletico Paranaense	2023	2028	11	0
25	Novatus Miroshi	(Tanzania)	DF	2 September 2002 (aged 21)	on loan from Zulte Waregem	2023	2024	6	0
26	Yukhym Konoplya	(Ukraine)	DF	26 August 1999 (aged 24)	Academy	2017		67	5
44	Yaroslav Rakitskyi	(Ukraine)	DF	3 August 1989 (aged 34)	Unattached	2023	2024	358	18
46	Luka Latsabidze	(Georgia (country))	DF	18 March 2004 (aged 20)	Dinamo Tbilisi	2024	2028	0	0
	Danylo Udod	(Ukraine)	DF	9 March 2004 (aged 20)	Academy	2021		0	0
Midfielders
6	Taras Stepanenko	(Ukraine)	MF	8 August 1989 (aged 34)	Metalurh Zaporizhya	2010	2025	424	29
8	Dmytro Kryskiv	(Ukraine)	MF	6 October 2000 (aged 23)	Academy	2019		59	11
9	Maryan Shved	(Ukraine)	MF	16 July 1997 (aged 26)	KV Mechelen	2022	2027	32	7
10	Heorhiy Sudakov	(Ukraine)	MF	1 September 2002 (aged 21)	Academy	2020	2028	99	19
11	Oleksandr Zubkov	(Ukraine)	MF	3 August 1996 (aged 27)	Ferencváros	2022	2027	86	13
21	Artem Bondarenko	(Ukraine)	MF	21 August 2000 (aged 23)	Academy	2020	2028	82	16
24	Viktor Tsukanov	(Ukraine)	MF	4 February 2006 (aged 18)	Academy	2024	2028	4	0
29	Yehor Nazaryna	(Ukraine)	MF	10 July 1997 (aged 26)	Zorya Luhansk	2022	2027	49	3
30	Marlon Gomes	(Brazil)	MF	14 December 2003 (aged 20)	Vasco da Gama	2024	2028	13	4
37	Kevin	(Brazil)	MF	4 January 2003 (aged 21)	Palmeiras	2024	2028	17	3
77	Khusrav Toirov	(Tajikistan)	MF	1 August 2004 (aged 19)	Atyrau	2023	2027	2	0
90	Oleksiy Kashchuk	(Ukraine)	MF	29 June 2000 (aged 23)	Vorskla Poltava	2016		12	4
Forwards
2	Lassina Traoré	(Burkina Faso)	FW	12 January 2001 (aged 23)	Ajax	2021	2026	65	19
7	Eguinaldo	(Brazil)	FW	9 August 2004 (aged 19)	Vasco da Gama	2023	2028	21	4
14	Danylo Sikan	(Ukraine)	FW	16 April 2001 (aged 23)	Karpaty Lviv	2019	2028	99	27
39	Newerton	(Brazil)	FW	3 June 2005 (aged 18)	São Paulo	2023	2028	21	1
Away on loan
4	Denil Castillo	(Ecuador)	MF	24 March 2004 (aged 20)	Liga de Quito	2023	2028	6	0
7	Andriy Totovytskyi	(Ukraine)	MF	20 January 1993 (aged 31)	Kolos Kovalivka	2022	2025	19	1
15	Anton Hlushchenko	(Ukraine)	MF	20 April 2004 (aged 20)	Academy	2022		1	0
18	Kevin Kelsy	(Venezuela)	FW	27 July 2004 (aged 19)	Boston River	2023	2027	37	9
20	Dmytro Topalov	(Ukraine)	MF	12 March 1998 (aged 26)	Academy	2017		18	0
27	Oleh Ocheretko	(Ukraine)	MF	25 March 2003 (aged 21)	Academy	2020	2027	17	1
28	Maryan Faryna	(Ukraine)	DF	28 August 2003 (aged 20)	Academy	2022		2	0
32	Eduard Kozik	(Ukraine)	DF	19 April 2003 (aged 21)	Academy	2021		8	0
34	Ivan Petryak	(Ukraine)	MF	13 March 1994 (aged 30)	Fehérvár	2022	2026	38	3
	Marlon	(Brazil)	DF	7 September 1995 (aged 28)	Sassuolo	2021	2026	22	0
	Vinicius Tobias	(Brazil)	DF	23 February 2004 (aged 20)	Internacional	2022		0	0
	Vitão	(Brazil)	DF	2 February 2000 (aged 24)	Palmeiras	2019	2024	36	0
	Valeriy Bondarenko	(Ukraine)	DF	3 February 1994 (aged 30)	Oleksandriya	2019		1	0
	Andriy Buleza	(Ukraine)	DF	25 January 2004 (aged 20)	Academy	2019		1	0
	Oleksandr Drambayev	(Ukraine)	DF	21 April 2001 (aged 23)	Academy	2020		0	0
	Dmytro Kapinus	(Ukraine)	DF	28 April 2003 (aged 21)	Academy	2019		0	0
	Viktor Korniyenko	(Ukraine)	DF	14 February 1999 (aged 25)	Academy	2016		30	1
	Roman Savchenko	(Ukraine)	DF	17 February 2004 (aged 20)	Academy	2021		0	0
	Maycon	(Brazil)	MF	15 July 1997 (aged 26)	Corinthians	2018	2025	98	8
	Pedrinho	(Brazil)	MF	13 April 1998 (aged 26)	Benfica	2021	2029	19	4
	Kyrylo Siheyev	(Ukraine)	MF	16 May 2004 (aged 20)	Academy	2021		0	0
	Danylo Honcharuk	(Ukraine)	FW	13 July 2002 (aged 21)	Academy	2019			
Players who left during the season
17	Bohdan Vyunnyk	(Ukraine)	FW	21 May 2002 (aged 22)	Academy	2020		12	1
23	Lucas Taylor	(Brazil)	DF	10 April 1995 (aged 29)	PAOK	2023		15	1
30	Andriy Pyatov	(Ukraine)	GK	28 June 1984 (aged 39)	Vorskla Poltava	2007	2023	482	0
45	Andriy Boryachuk	(Ukraine)	FW	23 April 1996 (aged 28)	Academy	2015		19	6
81	Anatoliy Trubin	(Ukraine)	GK	1 August 2001 (aged 22)	Academy	2019		93	0
	Maksym Chekh	(Ukraine)	MF	3 January 1999 (aged 25)	Academy	2018			

=== On loan ===
Note: Flags indicate national team as defined under FIFA eligibility rules; some limited exceptions apply. Players may hold more than one non-FIFA nationality.

No.	Pos.	Nation	Player
—	DF	UKR	Andriy Buleza (at Mynai until 30 June 2024)
—	DF	UKR	Oleksandr Drambayev (at Osijek until 30 June 2024)
—	DF	UKR	Maryan Faryna (at Metalist 1925 Kharkiv until 30 June 2024)
—	DF	UKR	Dmytro Kapinus (at Metalist 1925 Kharkiv until 30 June 2024)
—	DF	BRA	Marlon (at Fluminense until 30 June 2024)
—	DF	UKR	Roman Savchenko (at Oleksandriya until 30 June 2024)
—	DF	BRA	Vinicius Tobias (at Real Madrid Castilla until 30 June 2024)

No.	Pos.	Nation	Player
—	DF	BRA	Vitão (at Internacional until 30 June 2024)
—	DF	UKR	Viktor Korniyenko (at Vorskla Poltava until 30 June 2024)
—	MF	BRA	Maycon (at Corinthians until 31 December 2023)
—	MF	BRA	Pedrinho (at Atlético Mineiro until 31 December 2023)
—	MF	UKR	Kyrylo Siheyev (at Oleksandriya until 30 June 2024)
—	MF	UKR	Andriy Totovytskyi (at Kolos kovalivka until 30 June 2024)
—	FW	UKR	Danylo Honcharuk (at Kryvbas Kryvyi Rih until 30 June 2024)

== Transfers ==
=== In ===
Date	Position	Nationality	Name	From	Fee	Ref.
1 July 2023	MF	(Ecuador)	Denil Castillo	Liga de Quito	Undisclosed	
19 July 2023	DF	(Brazil)	Pedrinho	Athletico Paranaense	Undisclosed	
21 July 2023	FW	(Brazil)	Newerton	São Paulo	Undisclosed	
31 July 2023	DF	(Israel)	Stav Lemkin	Hapoel Tel Aviv	Undisclosed	
31 July 2023	FW	(Brazil)	Eguinaldo	Vasco da Gama	Undisclosed	
4 August 2023	DF	(Ukraine)	Dmytro Chyhrynskyi	Unattached	Free	
22 August 2023	DF	(Georgia (country))	Irakli Azarovi	Red Star Belgrade	Undisclosed	
2 September 2023	GK	(Ukraine)	Artur Rudko	Unattached	Free	
19 January 2024	MF	(Brazil)	Kevin	Palmeiras	Undisclosed	
26 January 2024	MF	(Brazil)	Marlon Gomes	Vasco da Gama	Undisclosed	
4 February 2024	DF	(Georgia (country))	Luka Latsabidze	Dinamo Tbilisi	Undisclosed	

=== Loans in ===
Date from	Position	Nationality	Name	From	Date to	Ref.
1 September 2023	DF	(Tanzania)	Novatus Miroshi	Zulte Waregem	End of season	

=== Out ===
Date	Position	Nationality	Name	To	Fee	Ref.
5 July 2023	MF	(Croatia)	Neven Đurasek	Aris Thessaloniki	Undisclosed	
10 August 2023	GK	(Ukraine)	Anatoliy Trubin	Benfica	Undisclosed	
5 September 2023	FW	(Ukraine)	Andriy Boryachuk	Metalist 1925 Kharkiv	Undisclosed	

=== Loans out ===
Date from	Position	Nationality	Name	To	Date to	Ref.
24 August 2023	DF	(Ukraine)	Viktor Korniyenko	Vorskla Poltava	End of season	
5 September 2023	MF	(Ukraine)	Maryan Faryna	Metalist 1925 Kharkiv	End of season	
5 September 2023	MF	(Ukraine)	Andriy Totovytskyi	Kolos Kovalivka	End of season	
21 January 2024	MF	(Ecuador)	Denil Castillo	Partizan	End of season	
6 February 2024	MF	(Ukraine)	Oleh Ocheretko	Dnipro-1	End of season	
30 April 2024	FW	(Venezuela)	Kevin Kelsy	FC Cincinnati	31 December 2024	

=== Released ===
Date	Position	Nationality	Name	Joined	Date	Ref.
6 August 2023	GK	(Ukraine)	Andriy Pyatov	Retirement		
1 September 2023	DF	(Brazil)	Lucas Taylor	Polissya Zhytomyr	16 October 2023	
22 February 2024	FW	(Ukraine)	Bohdan Vyunnyk	Lechia Gdańsk	6 March 2024	
30 June 2024	GK	(Ukraine)	Artur Rudko	Chornomorets Odesa	1 July 2024	
30 June 2024	DF	(Brazil)	Vitão	Internacional	1 July 2024	
30 June 2024	DF	(Ukraine)	Valeriy Bondarenko	Kolos Kovalivka	1 July 2024	
30 June 2024	DF	(Ukraine)	Dmytro Chyhrynskyi	Retirement		
30 June 2024	MF	(Ukraine)	Oleksiy Kashchuk	Qarabağ	3 September 2024	

== Friendlies ==
8 July 2023	AZ Alkmaar (Netherlands)	3–3	(Ukraine) Shakhtar Donetsk	Netherlands
15:30 EEST (UTC+3)	M.de Wit 9'; Barası 47' van Bommel 65'	Report	Zubkov 17'; Bondar 50'; Kelsy 76'

13 July 2023	Shakhtar Donetsk (Ukraine)	0–5	(Greece) AEK Athens	Schiedam, Netherlands
18:00 EEST (UTC+3)		Report	García 12', 40', 65'; Zine 83', 87'	Stadium: Sportpark Harga

18 July 2023	Ajax (Netherlands)	3–0	(Ukraine) Shakhtar Donetsk	Ouder-Amstel, Netherlands
15:00 EEST (UTC+3)	Kudus 19' (pen.), 34'; Bergwijn 32'	Report		Stadium: Sportpark De Toekomst; Attendance: 150; Referee: Robin Hensgens (Netherlands)

22 July 2023	Utrecht (Netherlands)	2–4	(Ukraine) Shakhtar Donetsk	Vlaardingen, Netherlands
15:00 EEST (UTC+3)	Klaiber 79'; Boussaid 82'	Report	Traoré 2'; Viunnyk 30'; Sudakov 58'; Rakitskyi 84'	Stadium: Sportpark 't Nieuwelant; Attendance: 0 Referee: Nick Smit
Note: Behind closed doors and the encounter consisted of four half-hour halves.

6 August 2023	Tottenham Hotspur (England)	5–1	(Ukraine) Shakhtar Donetsk	Tottenham, England
16:00 EEST (UTC+3)	Kane 38' (pen.), 50', 55', 79'; Romero (yellow card) 59'; Scarlett (yellow card) 84', (goal) 90+4'; Emerson (yellow card) 85'	Report	Kelsy 45'; Castillo (yellow card) 86'	Stadium: Tottenham Hotspur Stadium; Attendance: 56,331; Referee: David Coote (England)

11 September 2023	Shakhtar Donetsk (Ukraine)	6–0	(Ukraine) Blaho-Yunist Verkhnia	Lviv
EEST (UTC+3)	Kelsy 11', 45'; Eguinaldo 38', 58'; Bondarenko 66'; Yanovych 78'	Report		Stadium: Arena Lviv

15 September 2023	Rukh Lviv (Ukraine)	0–2	(Ukraine) Shakhtar Donetsk	Lviv
14:00 EEST (UTC+3)		Report	Kelsy 36'; Newerton 51'	Stadium: Emily Resort Hotel Complex

20 November 2023	Rukh Lviv (Ukraine)	3–1	(Ukraine) Shakhtar Donetsk	Lviv
14:00 EET (UTC+2)	Slyubyk 14'; Kholod 44'; Stolyarchuk 64'	Report	Kelsy 7'	Stadium: Rukh Lviv Training Ground

18 December 2023	Avispa Fukuoka (Japan)	2–2	(Ukraine) Shakhtar Donetsk	Tokyo, Japan
12:00 EET (UTC+2)	Miya 34'; Kanamori 37'	Report	Shved 7', 53'	Stadium: Japan National Stadium; Attendance: 18,114

21 January 2024	Shakhtar Donetsk (Ukraine)	–	(Bulgaria) Ludogorets Razgrad	Antalya, Turkey
16:30 EET (UTC+2)				Stadium: Mardan Stadium
Note: Match cancelled due to weather conditions.

22 January 2024	Shakhtar Donetsk (Ukraine)	2–0	(Armenia) Pyunik	Antalya, Turkey
14:30 EET (UTC+2)	Zubkov; Tsukanov	Report		Stadium: Mardan Stadium; Attendance: 200

25 January 2024	Shakhtar Donetsk (Ukraine)	3–1	(Poland) Lech Poznań	Antalya, Turkey
17:00 EET (UTC+2)	Zubkov 21'; Bondarenko 42'; Tsukanov 55' (pen.)	Report	Gurgul 66'	Stadium: Mardan Stadium; Attendance: 200

28 January 2024	Shakhtar Donetsk (Ukraine)	0–0	(Slovenia) NK Maribor	Antalya, Turkey
16:30 EET (UTC+2)		Report		Stadium: Mardan Stadium; Attendance: 200
Note: Match consisted of four 30minute periods.

3 February 2024	Shakhtar Donetsk (Ukraine)	0–2	(Czech Republic) Hradec Králové	Antalya, Turkey
12:00 EET (UTC+2)		Report	Šašinka 22', 66'	Stadium: Mardan Stadium; Attendance: 50

3 February 2024	Shakhtar Donetsk (Ukraine)	2–3	(Bosnia and Herzegovina) Velež Mostar	Antalya, Turkey
16:30 EET (UTC+2)	Tsukanov 25'; Shved 45'	Report	Guliashvili 24'; Čaić 43'; Haskić 47'	Stadium: Mardan Stadium; Attendance: 200

8 February 2024	Shakhtar Donetsk (Ukraine)	4–1	(Turkmenistan) Arkadag	Antalya, Turkey
12:00 EET (UTC+2)	Eguinaldo 25' (pen.), 70'; Gocholeishvili 37' (pen.); Pedrinho 90+1'	Report	Annagulyýew 31'	Stadium: Mardan Stadium; Attendance: 50

8 February 2024	Shakhtar Donetsk (Ukraine)	1–1	(Poland) Lechia Gdańsk	Antalya, Turkey
16:30 EET (UTC+2)	Zubkov 17'	Report	Sezonienko 78'	Stadium: Mardan Stadium; Attendance: 200

15 March 2024	Karpaty Lviv (Ukraine)	2–2	(Ukraine) Shakhtar Donetsk	Antalya, Turkey
14:00 EET (UTC+2)	Kostenko 1'; Polehenko (yellow card) 8'; Arielson 76'; Tlumak (yellow card) 85'	Report	Traoré 13', 34'; Newerton (yellow card) 17'; Kryskiv (yellow card) 63'; Kevin (yellow card) 78'	Stadium: Mardan Stadium; Attendance: 200

== Competitions ==
=== Overall record ===
Competition	First match	Last match	Starting round	Final position	Record							
Competition	First match	Last match	Starting round	Final position	Pld	W	D	L	GF	GA	GD	Win %
Premier League	29 July 2023	25 May 2024	Matchday 1	Winners	30	22	5	3	63	24	+39	73.33
Ukrainian Cup	26 September 2023	15 May 2024	Round of 16	Winners	4	4	0	0	12	2	+10	100.00
Champions League	19 September 2023	13 December 2023	Group Stage	Group Stage	6	3	0	3	10	12	−2	50.00
Europa League	15 February 2024	22 February 2024	Knockout round play-offs	Knockout round play-offs	2	0	1	1	3	5	−2	0.00
Total					42	29	6	7	88	43	+45	69.05

Last updated: 25 May 2024
Source: Results

=== Premier League ===
==== League table ====
Pos	Team	Pld	W	D	L	GF	GA	GD	Pts	Qualification or relegation
1	Shakhtar Donetsk (C)	30	22	5	3	63	24	+39	71	Qualification for the Champions League league stage (Note: Since already qualified Real Madrid won the Champions League, Shakhtar Donetsk was promoted to the Champions League league phase as the champion with the highest coefficient in Champions League qualifying.)
2	Dynamo Kyiv	30	22	3	5	72	28	+44	69	Qualification for the Champions League second qualifying round
3	Kryvbas Kryvyi Rih	30	17	6	7	51	30	+21	57	Qualification for the Europa League third qualifying round (Note: Since the 2023–24 Ukrainian Cup winners (Shakhtar Donetsk) finished in the top two, the Europa League spot was passed to the third-placed team, and the second Conference League second qualifying round spot was passed to the fifth-placed team.)
4	Dnipro-1 (D)	30	14	10	6	40	27	+13	52	Withdrew after the season (Note: SC Dnipro-1 that withdrew from all tournaments of the 2024–25 season due to financial hardship after finishing 4th in the league qualified for the Conference League second qualifying round, however it was awarded technical losses in both matches (0:3).)
5	Polissya Zhytomyr	30	14	8	8	39	30	+9	50	Qualification for the Conference League second qualifying round

Source: upl.ua
Rules for classification: 1) Points; 2) Head-to-head points; 3) Head-to-head goal difference; 4) Head-to-head goals scored; 5) Goal difference; 6) Goals scored; 7) Draw or "Golden match" if two teams tied for title (Article 22, paragraph 3).
(C) Champions; (D) Disqualified

==== Results summary ====
Overall								Home						Away					
Pld	W	D	L	GF	GA	GD	Pts	W	D	L	GF	GA	GD	W	D	L	GF	GA	GD
30	22	5	3	63	24	+39	71	12	1	2	31	12	+19	10	4	1	32	12	+20

Last updated: 25 May 2024.
Source: Results

==== Results by round ====
Round	1	2	3	4	5	6	7	8	9	11	13	14	15	16	17	18	19	20	21	22	23	24	10^{1}	25	26	12^{2}	27	28	29	30
Ground	A	A	H	A	A	A	H	A	H	A	A	H	H	H	H	A	H	H	H	A	H	A	A	H	A	A	H	H	A	A
Result	W	D	W	D	W	W	W	D	L	W	W	L	D	W	W	D	W	W	W	W	W	W	W	W	W	W	W	W	D	L
Position	5	5	4	1	1	1	1	1	1	2	3	4	4	4	4	4	3^{3}	1	1	1	1	1	1	1	1	1	1	1	1	1

Updated to match(es) played on 25 May 2024. Source: Results
A = Away; H = Home; W = Win; D = Draw; L = Loss
Notes:
- ^{1} Matchday 10 (vs Zorya Luhansk) was postponed.
- ^{2} Matchday 12 (vs Chornomorets Odesa) was postponed.
- ^{3} Between matchday 19 and 20, Shakhtar were awarded a technical victory over Oleksandriya.

==== Results ====
29 July 2023 1	Metalist 1925 Kharkiv	1–2	Shakhtar Donetsk	Hnidyn
17:00 EEST (UTC+3)	Yusov 56'; A.Tkachuk (yellow card) 71'; Bezuhlyi (yellow card) 90'; Rusyn (yellow card) 90+3'	Report	Bondarenko (yellow card) 27'; Matviyenko 30'; Traoré 47' (yellow card) 62'	Stadium: Livyi Bereh Stadium; Attendance: 0 Referee: Vitalii Romanov

2 August 2023 2	Veres Rivne	1–1	Shakhtar Donetsk	Rivne
17:00 EEST (UTC+3)	Kukharuk (yellow card) 35'; Kucherov (yellow card) 50'; Shevchenko 62'; Sharay (yellow card) 65'; Shestakov (yellow card) 69'; Vovchenko (yellow card) 83'	Report	Gocholeishvili (yellow card) 12'; Matviyenko 45+1' (yellow card) 65'; Bondarenko (red card) 45+2'; Traoré (yellow card) 48'; Faryna (yellow card) 55'	Stadium: Avanhard Stadium; Attendance: 0 Referee: Oleksandr Shandor

14 August 2023 3	Shakhtar Donetsk	2–1	Oleksandriya	Hnidyn
17:00 EEST (UTC+3)	Sikan 8'; Traoré 31'; Vyunnyk (yellow card) 70'; Matviyenko (yellow card) 85'	Report	Kopyna (yellow card) 45+1'; Skorko 60' (yellow card) 67'; Kalitvintsev (yellow card) 88'; Martynyuk (yellow card) 90+2'	Stadium: Livyi Bereh Stadium; Attendance: 0 Referee: Denys Shurman

20 August 2023 4	Kryvbas Kryvyi Rih	3–3	Shakhtar Donetsk	Kryvyi Rih
19:10 EEST (UTC+3)	Khomchenovskyi (yellow card) 10' (red card) 73' (goal) 24'; Beskorovaynyi (yellow card) 32' (goal) 64'; Kozhushko (yellow card) 33' (goal) 44'; Ponyedyelnik (yellow card) 87'; Bliznichenko (yellow card) 90+7'	Report	Kashchuk 8'; Kryskiv 18', 42'; Topalov (yellow card) 36'; Bondarenko (red card) 85'; Chyhrynskyi (yellow card) 90+1' (yellow-red card) 90+5'	Stadium: Hirnyk Stadium; Attendance: 0 Referee: Andrii Kovalenko
Note: Match delayed from 19:00 due to an Air Raid siren.

27 August 2023 5	Kolos Kovalivka	0–2	Shakhtar Donetsk	Kovalivka
15:00 EEST (UTC+3)	Burda (yellow card) 32'	Report	Nazaryna 25'; Gocholeishvili (red card) 37'; Kashchuk 45+2'; Sudakov (yellow card) 89'	Stadium: Kolos Stadium; Attendance: 0 Referee: Vitalii Romanov

2 September 2023 6	Mynai	1–4	Shakhtar Donetsk	Mynai
13:00 EEST (UTC+3)	Odaryuk (yellow card) 50'; Ralyuchenko (yellow card) 67'; Hunichev 72'	Report	Matviyenko 36'; Kashchuk 60'; Sudakov (yellow card) 65' (goal) 66'; Kelsy (yellow card) 74'; Vyunnyk 78'; Castillo (yellow card) 85'	Stadium: Mynai Arena; Attendance: 0 Referee: Dmytro Bondarenko

16 September 2023 7	Shakhtar Donetsk	1–0	Obolon Kyiv	Lviv
17:00 EEST (UTC+3)	Stepanenko (yellow card) 63'; Lemkin (yellow card) 67'; Nazaryna 77'	Report	Vovkun (yellow card) 25' (yellow-red card) 33'; Taranukha (yellow card) 32'; Rybka (yellow card) 90+5'; Pryimak (yellow card) 90+5'	Stadium: Arena Lviv; Attendance: 0 Referee: Mykola Balakin

23 September 2023 8	Rukh Lviv	1–1	Shakhtar Donetsk	Lviv
19:00 EEST (UTC+3)	Edson (yellow card) 48'; Klymchuk (yellow card) 64'; Slyubyk 88'	Report	Sudakov 17' (yellow card) 50'; Rakitskyi (red card) 21'; Stepanenko (yellow card) 67'; Konoplya (yellow card) 81'; Riznyk (yellow card) 87'; Castillo (yellow card) 90+2'	Stadium: Arena Lviv; Attendance: 0 Referee: Vitalii Romanov

30 September 2023 9	Shakhtar Donetsk	1–2	Vorskla Poltava	Lviv
17:00 EEST (UTC+3)	Zubkov 57'; Stepanenko (yellow card) 58'	Report	Sklyar 22' (pen.); Nesterenko 72'	Stadium: Arena Lviv; Attendance: 0 Referee: Viktor Kopievskii

21 October 2023 11	Shakhtar Donetsk	3–0	LNZ Cherkasy	Lviv
17:00 EEST (UTC+3)	Sikan 20'; Bondarenko (yellow card) 35'; Konoplya (yellow card) 78'; Kelsy 84', 90'	Report		Stadium: Arena Lviv; Attendance: 0 Referee: Kateryna Monzul

3 November 2023 13	Dynamo Kyiv	0–1	Shakhtar Donetsk	Kyiv
17:00 EET (UTC+2)	Shepelyev (yellow card) 14'; Dyachuk (yellow card) 47'; Shaparenko (yellow card) 52'; N.Voloshyn (yellow card) 62'; Dubinchak (yellow card) 90+3'	Report	Kryskiv (yellow card) 16'; Matviyenko (yellow card) 38'; Zubkov 53'; Gocholeishvili (yellow card) 77'; Bondar (yellow card) 85'	Stadium: Valeriy Lobanovskyi Dynamo Stadium; Attendance: 0 Referee: Yaroslav Kozyk

12 November 2023 14	Shakhtar Donetsk	1–3	Dnipro-1	Lviv
19:00 EET (UTC+2)	Sikan 5'; Bondar (yellow card) 76'	Report	Sarapiy 41'; Hutsulyak 51'; Lyednyev 56'; Rubchynskyi (yellow card) 61'	Stadium: Arena Lviv; Attendance: 0 Referee: Mykola Balakin

24 November 2023 15	Shakhtar Donetsk	0–0	Polissya Zhytomyr	Lviv
19:00 EET (UTC+2)	Sudakov (yellow card) 34'	Report	Shapoval (yellow card) 10'; Arielson (yellow card) 80'; Tankovskyi (yellow card) 82' (yellow-red card) 90+2'	Stadium: Arena Lviv; Attendance: 0 Referee: Ihor Paskhal

3 December 2023 16	Shakhtar Donetsk	2–0	Metalist 1925 Kharkiv	Lviv
17:00 EET (UTC+2)	Zubkov 59'; Kryskiv 78' (pen.); Stepanenko (yellow card) 88'	Report	Boryachuk (yellow card) 65'	Stadium: Arena Lviv; Attendance: 0 Referee: Maksym Kozyriatskyi

8 December 2023 17	Shakhtar Donetsk	2–0	Veres Rivne	Lviv
17:00 EET (UTC+2)	Kryskiv 14'; Zubkov (penalty missed) 50' 69'	Report	Kukharuk (yellow card) 84'	Stadium: Arena Lviv; Attendance: 0 Referee: Kateryna Monzul

26 February 2024 18	Oleksandriya	0–3	Shakhtar Donetsk	Oleksandriia
14:45 EET (UTC+2)	Campos (yellow card) 21'; Martynyuk (yellow card) 65'; Kalitvintsev (yellow card) 78'; Shostak (yellow card) 90+1'	Report	Kevin (yellow card) 25'; Kryskiv (yellow card) 50'; Matviyenko (yellow card) 88'	Stadium: CSC Nika Stadium; Attendance: 573; Referee: Denys Shurman
Note: Matched kicked off 1hr45mins late due to an Air Raid alert. On 4 March, the UAF awarded the match as a 3-0 technical victory to Shakhtar Donetsk after Oleksandriya fielded Ivan Kalyuzhnyi who was not registered in time for the match.

3 March 2024 19	Shakhtar Donetsk	5–2	Kryvbas Kryvyi Rih	Lviv
18:00 EET (UTC+2)	Konoplya 9'; Kryskiv 22', 82'; Bondarenko 68'; Nazaryna (yellow card) 71'; Traoré 90+3'	Report	Adu 20' (yellow card) 22'; Ilić (red card) 55'; Stetskov 85'	Stadium: Arena Lviv; Attendance: 500; Referee: Mykola Balakin

8 March 2024 20	Shakhtar Donetsk	3–2	Kolos Kovalivka	Lviv
18:00 EET (UTC+2)	Kevin 49', 88'; Kryskiv (yellow card) 53'; Traoré 65'	Report	Ilyin 8'; Chornomorets (yellow card) 74'; Cucoș (yellow card) 75'; Traoré 90+4' (pen.)	Stadium: Arena Lviv; Attendance: 485; Referee: Maksym Kozyriatskyi

12 March 2024 21	Shakhtar Donetsk	2–0	Mynai	Lviv
18:00 EET (UTC+2)	Sudakov 24' (pen.); Sikan 30'	Report	Korniichuk (yellow card) 23'; Korablin (yellow card) 75'; Ustymenko (yellow card) 88'	Stadium: Arena Lviv; Attendance: 410; Referee: Volodymyr Novohatnii

30 March 2024 22	Obolon Kyiv	0–3	Shakhtar Donetsk	Kyiv
13:00 EET (UTC+2)	Hrysyo (yellow card) 37'; Dubko (yellow card) 45+3'; Sukhanov (red card) 45+5'	Report	Sikan 16' (yellow card) 44'; Sudakov (yellow card) 28'; Kryskiv (yellow card) 33'; Shved 45+1', 90'	Stadium: Obolon Arena; Referee: Oleksandr Kalonov

7 April 2024 23	Shakhtar Donetsk	3–1	Rukh Lviv	Lviv
18:00 EEST (UTC+3)	Bondarenko 8', 16'; Kevin (yellow card) 28'; Zubkov 76'	Report	Sych (yellow card) 11'; Didyk (yellow card) 30'; Talles 36' (yellow card) 73'; Pidhurskyi (yellow card) 43'	Stadium: Arena Lviv; Attendance: 1,191; Referee: Vitalii Romanov

14 April 2024 24	Vorskla Poltava	0–1	Shakhtar Donetsk	Poltava
13:00 EEST (UTC+3)	Krupskyi (yellow card) 73'	Report	Sikan 21'; Zubkov (red card) 58'	Stadium: Oleksiy Butovsky Vorskla Stadium; Attendance: 2,682; Referee: Oleksandr Omelchenko

18 April 2024 10	Zorya Luhansk	1–3	Shakhtar Donetsk	Hnidyn
15:30 EEST (UTC+3)	Jordan (yellow card) 23' (yellow-red card) 57'; Guerrero (yellow card) 23'; Batahov (yellow card) 25'; Butko (yellow card) 55'; Kyryukhantsev 73'	Report	Sikan 30'; Bondar (yellow card) 60'; Bondarenko 87'; Newerton 90+1'	Stadium: Livyi Bereh Stadium; Attendance: 457; Referee: Dmytro Panchyshyn
Note: Match originally scheduled for 7 October 2023

22 April 2024 25	Shakhtar Donetsk	2–1	Zorya Luhansk	Lviv
18:00 EEST (UTC+3)	Eguinaldo 72'; Sikan 88' (yellow card) 88'	Report	Antyukh 51'; Saputin (yellow card) 83' (red card) 89'	Stadium: Arena Lviv; Attendance: 814; Referee: Oleksandr Kalonov

27 April 2024 26	LNZ Cherkasy	0–3	Shakhtar Donetsk	Cherkasy
15:30 EEST (UTC+3)	Jashari (yellow card) 24'; Eynel (yellow card) 73'	Report	Sikan 40' (yellow card) 45+3'; Sudakov 62'; Eguinaldo 90+2'	Stadium: Cherkasy Arena; Attendance: 435; Referee: Viktor Kopievskii

1 May 2024 12	Chornomorets Odesa	1–4	Shakhtar Donetsk	Zolochivsk rural hromada
13:00 EEST (UTC+3)	Badibanga 12'; Vasylyev (yellow card) 40'; Šporn (yellow card) 52'	Report	Gomes 3', 16', 41'; Shved 65'; Bondar (yellow card) 78'; Matviyenko (yellow card) 88'	Stadium: Livyi Bereh Arena; Attendance: 494; Referee: Vitalii Romanov
Note: Match originally scheduled for 28 October 2023

5 May 2024 27	Shakhtar Donetsk	3–0	Chornomorets Odesa	Hnidyn
18:00 EEST (UTC+3)	Sudakov 19'; Sikan 23'; Kevin 53' (pen.); Zubkov (yellow card) 73'	Report	Salyuk (yellow card) 58'	Stadium: Livyi Bereh Stadium; Attendance: 526; Referee: Anastasia Romaniuk

11 May 2024 28	Shakhtar Donetsk	1–0	Dynamo Kyiv	Lviv
18:00 EEST (UTC+3)	Sudakov (yellow card) 27' (goal) 33' (pen.); Matviyenko (yellow card) 41'; Konoplya (yellow card) 90+4'; Eguinaldo (red card) FT	Report	Vanat (yellow card) 70'; Yarmolenko (yellow card) 87'; Shaparenko (yellow card) 90+3'	Stadium: Arena Lviv; Attendance: 1,317; Referee: Oleksii Derevinskyi

19 May 2024 29	Dnipro-1	1–1	Shakhtar Donetsk	Dnipro
15:30 EEST (UTC+3)	Filippov 9'	Report	Gomes 44'; Gocholeishvili (yellow card) 49'; Kryskiv (yellow card) 90'	Stadium: Dnipro-Arena; Referee: Denys Shurman

25 May 2024 30	Polissya Zhytomyr	2–0	Shakhtar Donetsk	Zhytomyr
15:30 EEST (UTC+3)	Pedrinho 27' (o.g.); Hernández 29'; Fortuné (yellow card) 90+5'	Report	Kevin (yellow card) 90+4'	Stadium: Tsentralnyi Stadion; Attendance: 1,751; Referee: Oleksii Derevinskyi

=== Ukrainian Cup ===
26 September 2023 Round of 16	Veres Rivne	0–3	Shakhtar Donetsk	Rivne
17:00 EEST (UTC+3)	Hakman (yellow card) 90'	Report	Kashchuk 65'; Bondarenko 68'; Ocheretko 90+1'	Stadium: Avanhard Stadium; Referee: I.Paskhal

30 October 2023 Quarterfinal	Viktoriya Sumy	0–3	Shakhtar Donetsk	Hnidyn
15:00 EET (UTC+2)	Myshenko (yellow card) 26'; Sakhno (yellow card) 50'; Ulyanov (yellow card) 82'	Report	Nazaryna 17'; Zubkov 20'; Rakitskyi 90+1'	Stadium: Livyi Bereh; Referee: O.Derevinskyi

3 April 2024 Semifinal	Shakhtar Donetsk	4–1	Chornomorets Odesa	Lviv
18:00 EET (UTC+2)	Sikan 12'; Azarovi (yellow card) 16'; Bondarenko 44' (pen.); Sudakov 52', 79'	Report	Shtohrin 18'; Badibanga (yellow card) HT	Stadium: Arena Lviv; Attendance: 674; Referee: V.Kopievskyi

15 May 2024 Final	Vorskla Poltava	1–2	Shakhtar Donetsk	Rivne
19:00 EET (UTC+2)	Kovtalyuk 85'; Batsula (yellow card) 88'; Khrypchuk (yellow card) 90+2'	Report	Sikan 40'; Konoplya 55'; Traoré (yellow card) 89'; Kryskiv (yellow card) 90+2'; Riznyk (yellow card) 90+4'	Stadium: Avanhard Stadium; Attendance: 3,500; Referee: Vitaliy Romanov

=== UEFA Champions League ===
==== Group stage ====
Pos	Team	Pld	W	D	L	GF	GA	GD	Pts	Qualification
1	(Spain) Barcelona	6	4	0	2	12	6	+6	12 (Note: Head-to-head points: Barcelona 6, Porto 0.)	Advance to knockout phase
2	(Portugal) Porto	6	4	0	2	15	8	+7	12	Advance to knockout phase
3	(Ukraine) Shakhtar Donetsk	6	3	0	3	10	12	−2	9	Transfer to Europa League
4	(Belgium) Antwerp	6	1	0	5	6	17	−11	3	

Source: UEFA
Rules for classification: Group stage tiebreakers
Notes:

19 September 2023 1	Shakhtar Donetsk (Ukraine)	1–3	(Portugal) Porto	Hamburg, Germany (Note: Due to the Russian invasion of Ukraine, Ukrainian teams are required to play their home matches at neutral venues until further notice.)
22:00 EEST (UTC+3)	Sikan (yellow card) 6'; Kelsy 13'; Stepanenko (yellow card) 31'; Konoplya (yellow card) 76'	Report	Carmo (yellow card) 4'; Galeno 8', 15'; Taremi 29'; João Mário (yellow card) 54'	Stadium: Volksparkstadion; Attendance: 46,729; Referee: Davide Massa (Italy)

4 October 2023 2	Antwerp (Belgium)	2–3	(Ukraine) Shakhtar Donetsk	Antwerp, Belgium
19:45 EEST (UTC+3)	Muja 3'; Keita (yellow card) 12'; Balikwisha 33'; Janssen (yellow card) 37'; Alderweireld (yellow card) 90+1' (penalty missed) 90+7'	Report	Konoplya (yellow card) 36'; Sikan 48', 76', (yellow card) 82'; Rakitskyi (yellow card) 66', (goal) 71'	Stadium: Bosuilstadion; Attendance: 13,509; Referee: Rade Obrenovič (Slovenia)

25 October 2023 3	Barcelona (Spain)	2–1	(Ukraine) Shakhtar Donetsk	Barcelona, Spain
19:45 EEST (UTC+3)	Torres 28', (yellow card) 43'; López 36'; Balde (yellow card) 75'	Report	Kryskiv (yellow card) 50'; Sudakov 62'; Konoplya (yellow card) 72'; Bondar (yellow card) 87'	Stadium: Estadi Olímpic Lluís Companys; Attendance: 41,409; Referee: Ivan Kružliak (Slovakia)
Note: Match played at the Estadi Olímpic Lluís Companys, in Barcelona, instead of their regular stadium, Camp Nou, in Barcelona, which is being renovated.

7 November 2023 4	Shakhtar Donetsk (Ukraine)	1–0	(Spain) Barcelona	Hamburg, Germany
19:45 EET (UTC+2)	Sikan 40'; Newerton (yellow card) 90+8'	Report	Araújo (yellow card) 45+2'	Stadium: Volksparkstadion; Attendance: 49,147; Referee: Irfan Peljto (Bosnia and Herzegovina)

28 November 2023 5	Shakhtar Donetsk (Ukraine)	1–0	(Belgium) Antwerp	Hamburg, Germany
19:45 EET (UTC+2)	Matviyenko 12'; Gocholeishvili (yellow card) 83'; Riznyk (yellow card) 90+7'	Report	Coulibaly (yellow card) 30'; Kerk (yellow card) 45+1'; Muja (yellow card) 90+4' (yellow-red card) 90+7'	Stadium: Volksparkstadion; Attendance: 47,209; Referee: Bartosz Frankowski (Poland)

13 December 2023 6	Porto (Portugal)	5–3	(Ukraine) Shakhtar Donetsk	Porto, Portugal
22:00 EET (UTC+2)	Galeno 9', 43'; Taremi 62'; Pepe 75'; Conceição 82'	Report	Sikan 29'; Sudakov (yellow card) 54'; Eustáquio 72' (o.g.); Eguinaldo 88'; Nazaryna (yellow card) 90'; Bondar (yellow card) 90+1'	Stadium: Estádio do Dragão; Attendance: 48,113; Referee: István Kovács (Romania)

=== UEFA Europa League ===
==== Knockout phase ====
15 February 2024 Knockout round play-offs 1st leg	Shakhtar Donetsk (Ukraine)	2–2	(France) Marseille	Hamburg, Germany
19:45 EET (UTC+2)	Konoplya (yellow card) 49'; Matviyenko 68'; Zubkov (yellow card) 78'; Eguinaldo 90+3' (yellow card) 90+3'; Bondar (yellow card) 90+5'	Report	Balerdi (yellow card) 27'; Aubameyang 64'; Ndiaye 90'	Stadium: Volksparkstadion; Attendance: 28,790; Referee: Erik Lambrechts (Belgium)

22 February 2024 Knockout round play-offs 2nd leg	Marseille (France)	3–1 (5–3 agg.)	(Ukraine) Shakhtar Donetsk	Marseille, France
22:00 EET (UTC+2)	Gigot (yellow card) 17'; Aubameyang 23'; Sarr 74'; Kondogbia 81'	Report	Sudakov 12' (pen.); Eguinaldo (yellow card) 45'; Konoplya (yellow card) 45+3'; Matviyenko (yellow card) 58'; Stepanenko (yellow card) 80'; Rakitskyi (yellow card) 90+2'	Stadium: Stade Vélodrome; Referee: Tobias Stieler (Germany)

== Squad statistics ==
As of match played 25 May 2024

=== Appearances and goals ===
No.	Pos	Nat	Player	Total		Premier League		Ukrainian Cup		UEFA Champions League		UEFA Europa League	
No.	Pos	Nat	Player	Apps	Goals	Apps	Goals	Apps	Goals	Apps	Goals	Apps	Goals
1	GK	(Ukraine) UKR	Artur Rudko	1	0	1	0	0	0	0	0	0	0
2	FW	(Burkina Faso) BFA	Lassina Traoré	20	4	6+10	4	0+2	0	0	0	0+2	0
3	DF	(Israel) ISR	Stav Lemkin	5	0	1+3	0	0	0	1	0	0	0
5	DF	(Ukraine) UKR	Valeriy Bondar	28	0	20	0	3	0	4	0	1	0
6	MF	(Ukraine) UKR	Taras Stepanenko	31	0	14+6	0	1+2	0	6	0	2	0
7	FW	(Brazil) BRA	Eguinaldo	21	4	1+13	2	1+1	0	0+3	1	2	1
8	MF	(Ukraine) UKR	Dmytro Kryskiv	38	6	25+3	6	3+1	0	5	0	0+1	0
9	MF	(Ukraine) UKR	Maryan Shved	18	3	5+8	3	0+2	0	0+2	0	0+1	0
10	MF	(Ukraine) UKR	Heorhiy Sudakov	34	10	20+3	6	3	2	6	1	2	1
11	MF	(Ukraine) UKR	Oleksandr Zubkov	37	6	25	5	2+2	1	6	0	2	0
13	DF	(Georgia (country)) GEO	Giorgi Gocholeishvili	23	0	12+5	0	1	0	3+1	0	0+1	0
14	FW	(Ukraine) UKR	Danylo Sikan	42	16	25+5	10	2+2	2	6	4	2	0
16	DF	(Georgia (country)) GEO	Irakli Azarovi	32	0	18+4	0	4	0	3+1	0	2	0
19	DF	(Ukraine) UKR	Dmytro Chyhrynskyi	4	0	3	0	1	0	0	0	0	0
21	MF	(Ukraine) UKR	Artem Bondarenko	31	6	20+1	4	4	2	2+2	0	2	0
22	DF	(Ukraine) UKR	Mykola Matviyenko	32	5	23	3	2	0	5	1	2	1
23	DF	(Brazil) BRA	Pedrinho	11	0	6+3	0	0+1	0	0	0	0+1	0
24	MF	(Ukraine) UKR	Viktor Tsukanov	4	0	0+4	0	0	0	0	0	0	0
25	DF	(Tanzania) TAN	Novatus Miroshi	6	0	3+1	0	1	0	1	0	0	0
26	DF	(Ukraine) UKR	Yukhym Konoplya	30	2	18+3	1	3+1	1	3	0	2	0
29	MF	(Ukraine) UKR	Yehor Nazaryna	27	3	6+14	2	2	1	2+2	0	0+1	0
30	MF	(Brazil) BRA	Marlon Gomes	13	4	4+7	4	0+2	0	0	0	0	0
31	GK	(Ukraine) UKR	Dmytro Riznyk	40	0	28	0	4	0	6	0	2	0
37	MF	(Brazil) BRA	Kevin	17	3	11+3	3	2	0	0	0	0+1	0
39	FW	(Brazil) BRA	Newerton	21	1	9+6	1	1	0	2+2	0	0+1	0
44	DF	(Ukraine) UKR	Yaroslav Rakitskyi	18	2	7+4	0	1	1	4+1	1	1	0
48	GK	(Ukraine) UKR	Denys Tvardovskyi	2	0	2	0	0	0	0	0	0	0
90	MF	(Ukraine) UKR	Oleksiy Kashchuk	12	4	7+3	3	1	1	0+1	0	0	0
Players away on loan:
4	MF	(Ecuador) ECU	Denil Castillo	6	0	0+6	0	0	0	0	0	0	0
18	FW	(Venezuela) VEN	Kevin Kelsy	20	3	1+12	2	2	0	1+4	1	0	0
20	MF	(Ukraine) UKR	Dmytro Topalov	5	0	5	0	0	0	0	0	0	0
27	MF	(Ukraine) UKR	Oleh Ocheretko	4	1	1+2	0	0+1	1	0	0	0	0
28	MF	(Ukraine) UKR	Maryan Faryna	1	0	0+1	0	0	0	0	0	0	0
32	DF	(Ukraine) UKR	Eduard Kozik	5	0	4+1	0	0	0	0	0	0	0
Players who left Shakhtar Donetsk during the season:
17	FW	(Ukraine) UKR	Bohdan Vyunnyk	6	1	0+6	1	0	0	0	0	0	0

=== Goalscorers ===
Place	Position	Nation	Number	Name	Premier League	Ukrainian Cup	Champions League	Europa League	Total
1	FW	(Ukraine)	14	Danylo Sikan	10	2	4	0	16
2	MF	(Ukraine)	10	Heorhiy Sudakov	6	2	1	1	10
3	MF	(Ukraine)	8	Dmytro Kryskiv	6	0	0	0	6
4	MF	(Ukraine)	11	Oleksandr Zubkov	5	1	0	0	6
4	MF	(Ukraine)	21	Artem Bondarenko	4	2	0	0	6
6	DF	(Ukraine)	22	Mykola Matviyenko	3	0	1	1	5
7	FW	(Burkina Faso)	2	Lassina Traoré	4	0	0	0	4
7	MF	(Brazil)	30	Marlon Gomes	4	0	0	0	4
7	MF	(Ukraine)	90	Oleksiy Kashchuk	3	1	0	0	4
7	FW	(Brazil)	7	Eguinaldo	2	0	1	1	4
11	MF	(Ukraine)	9	Maryan Shved	3	0	0	0	3
11	MF	(Brazil)	37	Kevin	3	0	0	0	3
11	FW	(Venezuela)	18	Kevin Kelsy	2	1	0	0	3
11	MF	(Ukraine)	29	Yehor Nazaryna	2	1	0	0	3
15	DF	(Ukraine)	26	Yukhym Konoplya	1	1	0	0	2
15	DF	(Ukraine)	44	Yaroslav Rakitskyi	0	1	1	0	2
17	FW	(Ukraine)	17	Bohdan Vyunnyk	1	0	0	0	1
17	FW	(Brazil)	39	Newerton	1	0	0	0	1
17	MF	(Ukraine)	27	Oleh Ocheretko	0	0	1	0	1
17				Own goal	0	0	1	0	1
TOTALS					60	12	10	3	85

=== Clean sheets ===
Place	Position	Nation	Number	Name	Premier League	Ukrainian Cup	Champions League	Europa League	Total
1	GK	(Ukraine)	31	Dmytro Riznyk	12	2	2	0	16
2	GK	(Ukraine)	1	Artur Rudko	1	0	0	0	1
TOTALS					13	2	2	0	17

=== Disciplinary record ===
Number	Nation	Position	Name	Premier League		Ukrainian Cup		Champions League		Europa League		Total	
Number	Nation	Position	Name	Booked	Sent off (straight red)	Booked	Sent off (straight red)	Booked	Sent off (straight red)	Booked	Sent off (straight red)	Booked	Sent off (straight red)
2	(Burkina Faso)	FW	Lassina Traoré	2	0	1	0	0	0	0	0	3	0
3	(Israel)	DF	Stav Lemkin	1	0	0	0	0	0	0	0	1	0
5	(Ukraine)	DF	Valeriy Bondar	4	0	0	0	2	0	1	0	7	0
6	(Ukraine)	MF	Taras Stepanenko	4	0	0	0	1	0	1	0	6	0
7	(Brazil)	FW	Eguinaldo	0	1	0	0	0	0	2	0	2	1
8	(Ukraine)	MF	Dmytro Kryskiv	5	0	1	0	1	0	0	0	7	0
10	(Ukraine)	MF	Heorhiy Sudakov	6	0	0	0	1	0	0	0	7	0
11	(Ukraine)	MF	Oleksandr Zubkov	1	1	0	0	0	0	1	0	2	1
13	(Georgia (country))	DF	Giorgi Gocholeishvili	3	1	0	0	1	0	0	0	4	1
14	(Ukraine)	FW	Danylo Sikan	3	0	0	0	2	0	0	0	5	0
16	(Georgia (country))	DF	Irakli Azarovi	0	0	1	0	0	0	0	0	1	0
19	(Ukraine)	DF	Dmytro Chyhrynskyi	2	1	0	0	0	0	0	0	2	1
21	(Ukraine)	MF	Artem Bondarenko	2	2	0	0	0	0	0	0	2	2
22	(Ukraine)	DF	Mykola Matviyenko	6	0	0	0	0	0	1	0	7	0
26	(Ukraine)	DF	Yukhym Konoplya	3	0	0	0	3	0	2	0	8	0
29	(Ukraine)	MF	Yehor Nazaryna	1	0	0	0	1	0	0	0	2	0
31	(Ukraine)	GK	Dmytro Riznyk	1	0	1	0	1	0	0	0	3	0
37	(Brazil)	MF	Kevin	3	0	0	0	0	0	0	0	3	0
39	(Brazil)	FW	Newerton	0	0	0	0	1	0	0	0	1	0
44	(Ukraine)	DF	Yaroslav Rakitskyi	0	1	0	0	1	0	1	0	2	1
Players away on loan:
4	(Ecuador)	MF	Denil Castillo	2	0	0	0	0	0	0	0	2	0
18	(Venezuela)	FW	Kevin Kelsy	1	0	0	0	0	0	0	0	1	0
20	(Ukraine)	MF	Dmytro Topalov	1	0	0	0	0	0	0	0	1	0
28	(Ukraine)	MF	Maryan Faryna	1	0	0	0	0	0	0	0	1	0
Players who left Shakhtar Donetsk during the season:
17	(Ukraine)	FW	Bohdan Vyunnyk	1	0	0	0	0	0	0	0	1	0
			TOTALS	53	7	4	0	15	0	9	0	81	7
