= Dmytro Kryskiv =

Ukrainian footballer

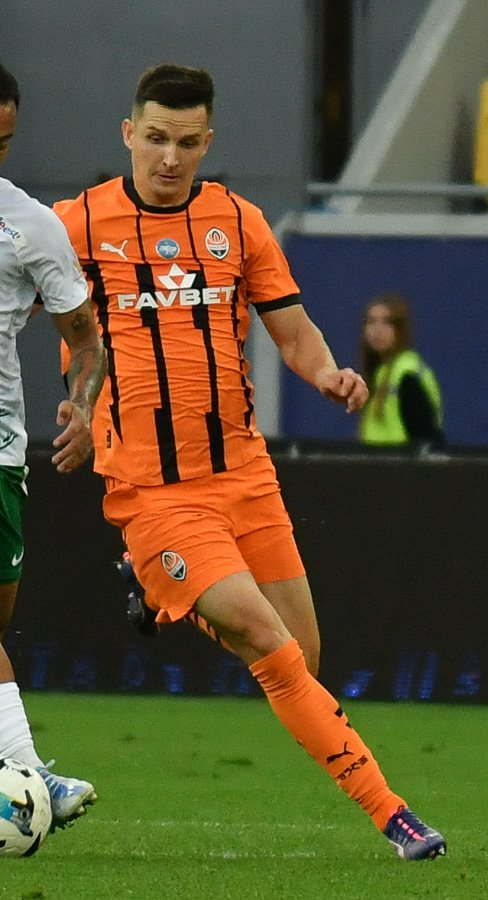

Personal information
- Full name: Dmytro Ihorovych Kryskiv
- Date of birth: 6 October 2000 (age 26)
- Place of birth: Kharkiv, Ukraine
- Height: 1.80 m (5 ft 11 in)
- Position: Central midfielder

Team information
- Current team: Shakhtar Donetsk
- Number: 8

Youth career
- 2013–2016: Metalist Kharkiv
- 2016–2019: Shakhtar Donetsk

Senior career*
| Years | Team | Apps | (Gls) |
| 2019– | Shakhtar Donetsk | 87 | (11) |
| 2020 | → Mariupol (loan) | 0 | (0) |
| 2020–2022 | → Metalist 1925 Kharkiv (loan) | 41 | (4) |

International career
| 2019 | Ukraine U19 | 3 | (0) |
| 2019–2023 | Ukraine U21 | 21 | (4) |
| 2024 | Ukraine U23 (O.P.) | 5 | (1) |
| 2024 | Ukraine | 3 | (0) |
Medal record
Men's football
Representing Ukraine
UEFA European Under-21 Championship
| Bronze medal – third place | 2023 Georgia-Romania |
- * Club domestic league appearances and goals as of 30 October 2026

Dmytro Ihorovych Kryskiv (Ukrainian: Дмитро́ І́горович Кри́ськів; born 6 October 2000) is a Ukrainian professional footballer who plays as a central midfielder for Ukrainian Premier League club Shakhtar Donetsk.

== Career ==
Born in Kharkiv, Kryskiv began his career in the local Metalist Kharkiv youth academy, until his transfer to the Shakhtar Donetsk youth system in 2016.

He played in the Ukrainian Premier League Reserves and never made his debut for the senior Shakhtar Donetsk squad. In September 2020 Kryskiv went on loan to Ukrainian Premier League club FC Mariupol, but a month later he went on loan to the Ukrainian First League Metalist 1925 Kharkiv and made his debut in a home match against Polissya Zhytomyr on 5 October 2020.

In April 2021 Kryskiv was recognized as a player of the month in the Ukrainian First League.

On 11 February 2026, Kryskiv extended his contract with Shakhtar Donetsk until 31 December 2030.

== Career statistics ==
=== Club ===
As of match played 30 October 2026

Appearances and goals by club, season and competition
| Club | Season | League | | | Cup | | Europe | | Other | | Total | |
| Club | Season | Division | Apps | Goals | Apps | Goals | Apps | Goals | Apps | Goals | Apps | Goals |
|---|---|---|---|---|---|---|---|---|---|---|---|---|
| Shakhtar Donetsk | 2019–20 | Ukrainian Premier League | 0 | 0 | 0 | 0 | 0 | 0 | 0 | 0 | 0 | 0 |
| Shakhtar Donetsk | 2022–23 | Ukrainian Premier League | 18 | 5 | 0 | 0 | 4 (Note: One appearance in UEFA Champions League, three appearances and one goal in UEFA Europa League) | 1 | 0 | 0 | 22 | 6 |
| Shakhtar Donetsk | 2023–24 | Ukrainian Premier League | 28 | 5 | 4 | 0 | 6 (Note: Five appearances in UEFA Champions League, one appearance in UEFA Europa League) | 0 | 0 | 0 | 38 | 5 |
| Shakhtar Donetsk | 2024–25 | Ukrainian Premier League | 24 | 1 | 2 | 0 | 8 (Note: Appearances in UEFA Champions League) | 0 | 0 | 0 | 34 | 1 |
| Shakhtar Donetsk | 2025–26 | Ukrainian Premier League | 7 | 0 | 1 | 0 | 3 (Note: Appearances in UEFA Conference League) | 0 | — | | 11 | 0 |
| Shakhtar Donetsk | 2026–27 | Ukrainian Premier League | 7 | 0 | 1 | 0 | 1 | 0 | — | | 9 | 0 |
| Shakhtar Donetsk | Total | | 84 | 11 | 8 | 0 | 22 | 1 | 0 | 0 | 114 | 12 |
| Mariupol (loan) | 2020–21 | Ukrainian Premier League | 0 | 0 | 0 | 0 | — | | — | | 0 | 0 |
| Metalist 1925 Kharkiv (loan) | 2020–21 | Ukrainian First League | 25 | 2 | 0 | 0 | — | | — | | 25 | 2 |
| Metalist 1925 Kharkiv (loan) | 2021–22 | Ukrainian Premier League | 19 | 2 | 2 | 1 | — | | — | | 21 | 3 |
| Metalist 1925 Kharkiv (loan) | Total | | 44 | 4 | 2 | 1 | — | | — | | 46 | 5 |
| Career total | | | 127 | 15 | 10 | 1 | 22 | 1 | 0 | 0 | 160 | 17 |

=== International ===
Appearances and goals by national team and year
| National team | Year | Apps | Goals |
|---|---|---|---|
| Ukraine | 2024 | 3 | 0 |
| Total | | 3 | 0 |

== Honours ==
Shakhtar Donetsk

- Ukrainian Cup: 2024–25
