= Irakli Azarovi =

Georgian footballer (born 2002)

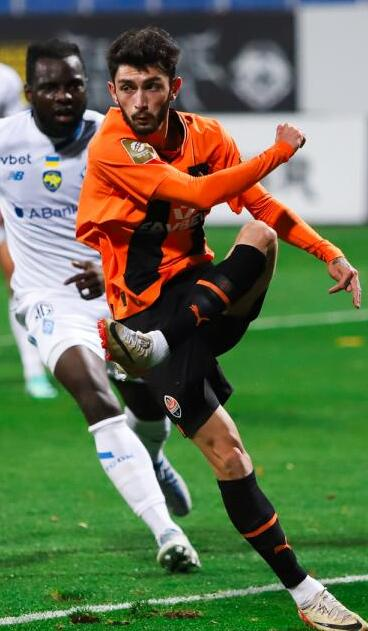
- Azarovi in 2023 with Shakhtar Donetsk

Personal information
- Date of birth: 21 February 2002 (age 24)
- Place of birth: Batumi, Georgia
- Height: 1.72 m (5 ft 8 in)
- Position: Left-back

Team information
- Current team: Shakhtar Donetsk
- Number: 16

Youth career
- 2012–2019: Dinamo Tbilisi

Senior career*
Years	Team	Apps	(Gls)
2019–2020	Dinamo Tbilisi	12	(0)
2021–2022	Dinamo Batumi	53	(3)
2022–2023	Red Star Belgrade	21	(0)
2023–	Shakhtar Donetsk	51	(0)

International career^{‡}
2017–2018	Georgia U17	7	(0)
2019	Georgia U18	1	(0)
2019	Georgia U19	3	(0)
2020–2025	Georgia U21	15	(0)
2021–	Georgia	27	(0)
- * Club domestic league appearances and goals as of 30 October 2026 ‡ National team caps and goals as of 18 November 2026

Irakli Azarovi (Georgian: ირაკლი აზაროვი; born 21 February 2002) is a Georgian professional footballer who plays as a left-back for Ukrainian Premier League club Shakhtar Donetsk and the Georgia national team.

Azarovi has won the Georgian, Serbian and Ukrainian top league trophies five times in a row. He has also been recognized as the Erovnuli Liga Defender of the Year and best young player of the season.

== Club career ==
=== Dinamo Tbilisi ===
Born in the Georgian capital, Tbilisi, Azarovi joined Dinamo Tbilisi, aged 10. He trained regularly in the youth teams of the club all the way until 2019 when he debuted for the Dinamo first team. Playing mostly as a reserve, he made seven appearances in 2019, and five in the 2020 season, contributing in both for Dinamo to win the Georgian national title.

=== Dinamo Batumi ===
In 2021, Dinamo Batumi was betting strong and bringing quality reinforcements, so Azarovi made a move that earned him much more play time and becoming a regular in the starting line-up, resulting in a successful season crowned with a 2021 Georgian championship. This also made him became a regular call in the Georgian national team, resulting in a widespread interest from clubs from abroad.

=== Red Star Belgrade ===
Soon, after a half season with Dinamo Batumi in the 2022 season, Serbian club Red Star Belgrade brought Azarovi to their ranks. In December 2022, he was announced as a top 10 most talented left-backs in world football.

Azarovi made 21 league appearances for the club, who clinched the league title this season. This success made him a four-time champion at the age of 21.

=== Shakhtar Donetsk ===
On 22 August 2023, Ukrainian club Shakhtar Donetsk announced signing Azarovi on a five-year deal. He played 32 matches in all competitions and with Shakhtar winning the Premier League and the national cup added two more titles to his tally.

Following this season, Azarovi joined the list of top five highest valued Georgian players.

== International career ==
Azarovi made his international debut for Georgia on 2 June 2021, starting in a friendly match against Romania. He took part in most of Georgia's 2022–23 UEFA Nations League matches which paved the way for their first ever qualification for a major international tournament.

Before that, he was a regular in all youth team squads since 2017. Azarovi is the two-time participant of the UEFA European Under-21 Championship, making appearances in all seven matches of the 2023 and 2025 editions of this tournament.

== Career statistics ==
=== Club ===
As of match played 30 October 2026

Appearances and goals by club, season and competition
Club	Season	League			National cup (Note: Includes Georgian Cup, Serbian Cup, Ukrainian Cup)		Continental		Other		Total	
Club	Season	Division	Apps	Goals	Apps	Goals	Apps	Goals	Apps	Goals	Apps	Goals
Dinamo Tbilisi	2019	Erovnuli Liga	7	0	–		1 (Note: Appearances in UEFA Europa League)	0	–		8	0
Dinamo Tbilisi	2020	Erovnuli Liga	5	0	1	0	–		–		6	0
Dinamo Tbilisi	Total		12	0	1	0	1	0	0	0	14	0
Dinamo Batumi	2021	Erovnuli Liga	35	3	2	0	5 (Note: Appearances in UEFA Europa Conference League)	1	–		42	4
Dinamo Batumi	2022	Erovnuli Liga	18	0	–		4 (Note: Two appearances in UEFA Champions League, two appearances in UEFA Europa Conference League)	0	1 (Note: Appearance in Georgian Super Cup)	0	23	0
Dinamo Batumi	Total		53	3	2	0	9	1	1	0	65	4
Red Star	2022–23	Serbian Super Liga	20	0	4	0	1	0	–		25	0
Red Star	2023–24	Serbian Super Liga	1	0	–		–		–		1	0
Red Star	Total		21	0	4	0	1	0	0	0	26	0
Shakhtar Donetsk	2023–24	Ukrainian Premier League	22	0	4	0	6 (Note: Four appearances in UEFA Champions League, two appearances in UEFA Europa League)	0	0	0	32	0
Shakhtar Donetsk	2024–25	Ukrainian Premier League	12	0	1	0	2 (Note: Appearances in UEFA Champions League)	0	0	0	15	0
Shakhtar Donetsk	2025–26	Ukrainian Premier League	14	0	0	0	6 (Note: One appearance in UEFA Europa League, five appearances in UEFA Conference League)	0	—		20	0
Shakhtar Donetsk	2026–27	Ukrainian Premier League	3	0	2	0	0	0	—		5	0
Shakhtar Donetsk	Total		51	0	7	0	14	0	0	0	72	0
Career total			137	3	14	0	25	1	1	0	176	4

=== International ===
As of 17 November 2026

Appearances and goals by national team and year
National team	Year	Apps	Goals
Georgia	2021	6	0
Georgia	2022	4	0
Georgia	2023	8	0
Georgia	2025	4	0
Georgia	2026	5	0
Total		27	0

== Honours ==
Dinamo Tbilisi

- Erovnuli Liga: 2019, 2020

Dinamo Batumi

- Erovnuli Liga: 2021

Red Star Belgrade

- Serbian SuperLiga: 2022–23
- Serbian Cup: 2022–23

Shakhtar

- Ukrainian Premier League: 2023–24
- Ukrainian Cup: 2023–24, 2024–25

Individual

- Best Georgian young player: 2021
- Erovnuli Liga Defender of the Year: 2021

== Personal life ==
Azarovi is married to Nini Abesadze. Their baby girl Nila was born on 23 December 2024.
