= Novatus Miroshi =

Tanzanian footballer (born 2002)

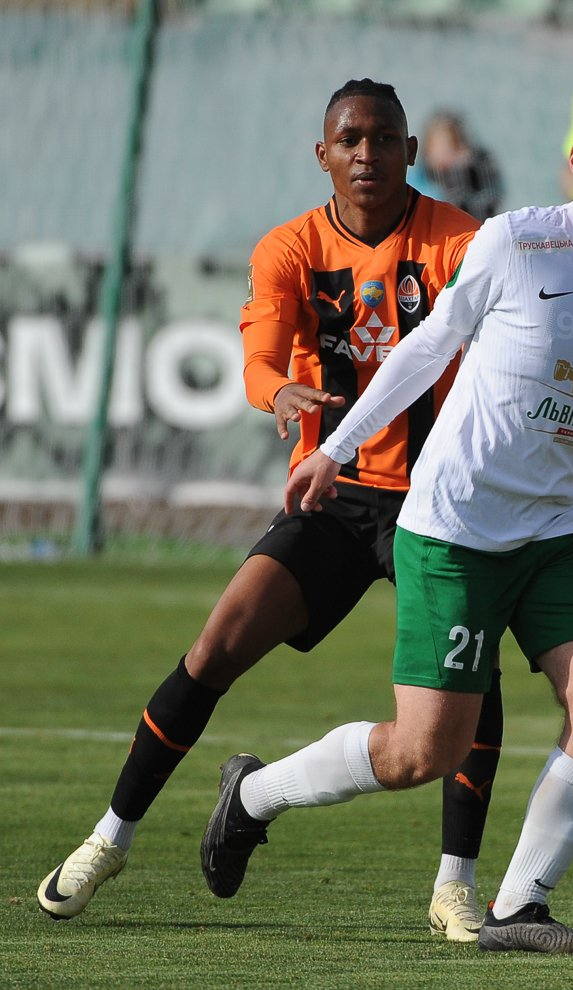
- Miroshi with Shakhtar Donetsk

Personal information
- Full name: Novatus Dismas Miroshi
- Date of birth: 2 September 2002 (age 24)
- Place of birth: Tanga, Tanzania
- Height: 1.85 m (6 ft 1 in)
- Position: Left-back

Team information
- Current team: Göztepe
- Number: 20

Youth career
- –2020: Azam F.C.
- 2020–2021: Maccabi Tel Aviv

Senior career*
Years	Team	Apps	(Gls)
2021–2022	Maccabi Tel Aviv	0	(0)
2021–2022	→ Beitar Tel Aviv Bat Yam (loan)	24	(1)
2022–2024	Zulte Waregem	33	(0)
2023–2024	→ Shakhtar Donetsk (loan)	4	(0)
2024–	Göztepe	57	(7)

International career^{‡}
2021–	Tanzania U20	3	(1)
2021–	Tanzania	24	(3)
- * Club domestic league appearances and goals as of 29 August 2026 ‡ National team caps and goals as of 19 September 2024

Novatus Dismas Miroshi (born 2 September 2002) is a Tanzanian professional footballer who plays as a left-back for Süper Lig side Göztepe and the Tanzania national team. Miroshi made his debut for the senior national team in 2021.

== Club career ==
In the summer of 2022, Miroshi signed a three-year contract with Zulte Waregem in Belgium.

He signed a four-year contract with Göztepe on 23 July 2024.

== International career ==
Miroshi made his international debut with the Tanzania under-20 team on 16 February 2021 in a 4–0 defeat to Ghana at the 2021 Africa U-20 Cup of Nations. On 19 February, he scored his first goal for Tanzania against the Gambia in a 1–1 draw.

On 2 September 2021, Miroshi made his senior debut in a 1–1 draw against DR Congo in 2022 FIFA World Cup qualifying. On 7 September, he scored his first senior goal in a 3–2 victory against Madagascar.

== Career statistics ==
=== Club ===
As of match played 10 September 2024

Appearances and goals by club, season and competition
Club	Season	League			National cup		Continental		Total	
Club	Season	Division	Apps	Goals	Apps	Goals	Apps	Goals	Apps	Goals
Maccabi Tel Aviv	2021-22	Israeli Premier League	0	0	0	0	0	0	0	0
Beitar Tel Aviv Bat Yam (loan)	2021-22	Liga Leumit	24	1	2	0	—		26	1
Zulte Waregem	2022-23	Belgian Pro League	31	0	5	0	—		36	0
Zulte Waregem	2023-24	Challenger Pro League	2	0	0	0	—		2	0
Zulte Waregem	Total		33	0	5	0	—		38	0
Shakhtar Donetsk (loan)	2023-24	Ukrainian Premier League	4	0	1	0	1 (Note: Appearance(s) in UEFA Champions League)	0	6	0
Göztepe	2024-25	Süper Lig	3	0	0	0	—		3	0
Career total			64	1	8	0	1	0	73	1

=== International ===
As of match played 10 September 2024

Appearances and goals by national team and year
National team	Year	Apps	Goals
Tanzania	2021	6	1
Tanzania	2022	4	1
Tanzania	2023	7	0
Tanzania	2024	7	1
Total		24	3

Scores and results list Tanzania's goal tally first, score column indicates score after each Miroshi goal.

List of international goals scored by Novatus Miroshi
No.	Date	Venue	Opponent	Score	Result	Competition	Ref.
1	7 September 2021	Benjamin Mkapa Stadium, Dar es Salaam, Tanzania	Madagascar	2–0	3–2	2022 FIFA World Cup qualification	
2	23 March 2022	Benjamin Mkapa Stadium, Dar es Salaam, Tanzania	Central African Republic	1–0	3–1	Friendly	
3	25 March 2024	Dalga Arena, Baku, Azerbaijan	Mongolia	3–0	3–0	2024 FIFA Series	
4	29 March 2026	Kigali Pelé Stadium, Kigali, Rwanda	Macau	5–0	6–0	2026 FIFA Series	
