= Yan Vichnyi =

Ukrainian footballer (born 1997)

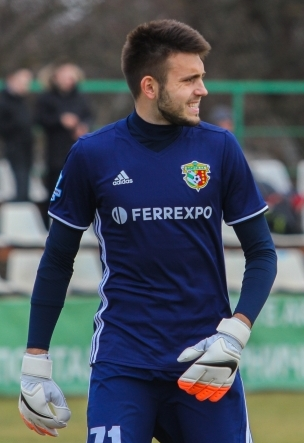

Personal information
- Full name: Yan Ihorovych Vichnyi
- Date of birth: 27 February 1997 (age 29)
- Place of birth: Zaporizhzhia, Ukraine
- Height: 1.90 m (6 ft 3 in)
- Position: Goalkeeper

Youth career
- 2005–2013: Metalurh Zaporizhzhia
- 2013–2014: UFK Kharkiv

Senior career*
Years	Team	Apps	(Gls)
2014–2018	Vorskla Poltava	1	(0)
2018–2021	Motor Zaporizhzhia	69	(0)
2021–2023	Poltava	30	(0)
2023–2024	Nyva Vinnytsia	17	(0)
2024–2026	Chornomorets Odesa	0	(0)
- * Club domestic league appearances and goals as of 4 March 2026

Yan Ihorovych Vichnyi (Ukrainian: Ян Ігорович Вічний; born 27 February 1997) is a Ukrainian professional footballer who plays as a goalkeeper.

== Career ==
Vichnyi is a product of FC Metalurh Zaporizhia and UFK Kharkiv youth sportive systems.

He spent his career in the Ukrainian Premier League Reserves club FC Vorskla Poltava. And in summer 2015 Vichnyi was promoted to the main-squad team of the FC Vorskla in the Ukrainian Premier League. He made his debut for Vorskla Poltava in the Ukrainian Premier League in a match against FC Dynamo Kyiv on 4 October 2015.

In February 2024 Vichnyi joined Ukrainian Premier League side FC Chornomorets Odesa, making his debut in the Ukrainian Cup in a match against FC Karpaty Lviv on 21 August 2024. On 4 March 2026, Vichnyi left the club.
