= Danylo Honcharuk =

Ukrainian footballer (born 2002)

Personal information
- Full name: Danylo Yevhenovych Honcharuk
- Date of birth: 13 July 2002 (age 24)
- Place of birth: Kirovohrad, Ukraine
- Height: 1.76 m (5 ft 9 in)
- Position: Centre-forward

Youth career
- 2015–2017: Piddubny Olympic College
- 2017–2019: Shakhtar Donetsk

Senior career*
Years	Team	Apps	(Gls)
2019–2024	Shakhtar Donetsk	0	(0)
2022	→ Mariupol (loan)	0	(0)
2022–2023	→ Lleida Esportiu (loan)	17	(3)
2023	→ El Ejido (loan)	7	(0)
2023–2024	→ Kryvbas Kryvyi Rih (loan)	1	(0)
2024–2026	Bukovyna Chernivtsi	37	(8)
2025–2026	→ Bukovyna-2 Chernivtsi	2	(2)
2026-	FC Probiy Horodenka	7	(1)

International career^{‡}
2017	Ukraine U16	4	(0)
2018–2019	Ukraine U17	10	(1)
2022–	Ukraine U21	2	(0)
- * Club domestic league appearances and goals as of 2 November 2026 @ 07:28(AEST) ‡ National team caps and goals as of 25 July 2023

Danylo Yevhenovych Honcharuk (Ukrainian: Данило Євгенович Гончарук; born 13 July 2002) is a Ukrainian professional footballer who plays as a centre-forward.
