= Andriy Buleza =

Ukrainian footballer (born 2004)

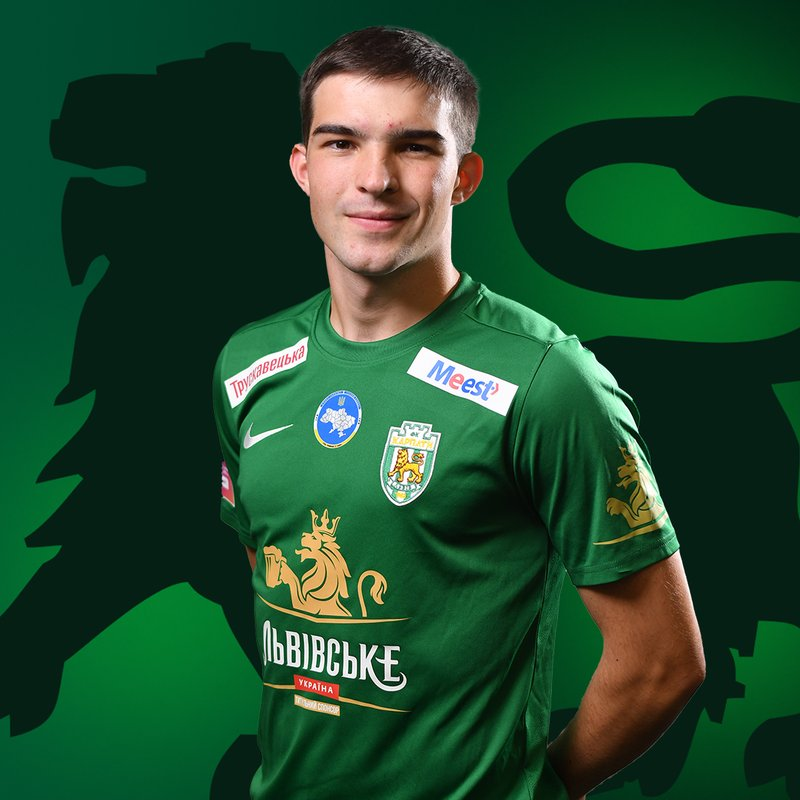

Personal information
- Full name: Andriy Mykhaylovych Buleza
- Date of birth: 25 January 2004 (age 22)
- Place of birth: Zarichchia, Zakarpattia Oblast, Ukraine
- Height: 1.77 m (5 ft 10 in)
- Position: Left-back

Team information
- Current team: Karpaty Lviv
- Number: 5

Youth career
- 2012–2017: DYuSSh Irshava
- 2017: Siltse
- 2017–2021: Shakhtar Donetsk

Senior career*
Years	Team	Apps	(Gls)
2019–2024	Shakhtar Donetsk	0	(0)
2023–2024	→ Mynai (loan)	25	(0)
2024	→ Karpaty Lviv (loan)	0	(0)
2024–	Karpaty Lviv	1	(0)

International career^{‡}
2019	Ukraine U16	2	(1)
2019–2020	Ukraine U17	6	(0)
2021–2023	Ukraine U19	12	(0)
2023–	Ukraine U21	1	(0)
- * Club domestic league appearances and goals as of 3 June 2026 ‡ National team caps and goals as of 24 August 2025

Andriy Mykhaylovych Buleza (Ukrainian: Андрій Михайлович Булеза; born 25 January 2004) is a Ukrainian professional footballer who plays as a left-back for Ukrainian First League club Karpaty Lviv.

== Early life ==
Buleza is a native of Zakarpattia Oblast, Ukraine.

== Club career ==
=== Early years ===
Before the youth championship of Ukraine, he played for the Irshava and Siltse academies.

=== Shakhtar Donetsk ===
Buleza started his career with Shakhtar Donetsk.

==== Loan to Mynai ====
In March 2023 he went on loan to Mynai in the Ukrainian Premier League. He made his league debut for Mynai as a starting squad player against Lviv on 6 March.

==== Loan to Karpaty ====
In February 2024 he went on loan to Karpaty Lviv in the Ukrainian First League (2nd tier).

== International career ==
Buleza has captained Ukraine at youth level.

On 6 March 2024, Buleza was called up by Ruslan Rotan to the Ukraine Olympic football team preliminary squad as a preparation to the 2024 Summer Olympics.

== Style of play ==
Buleza is known for his speed and passing ability.
