= Arielson =

Brazilian football player

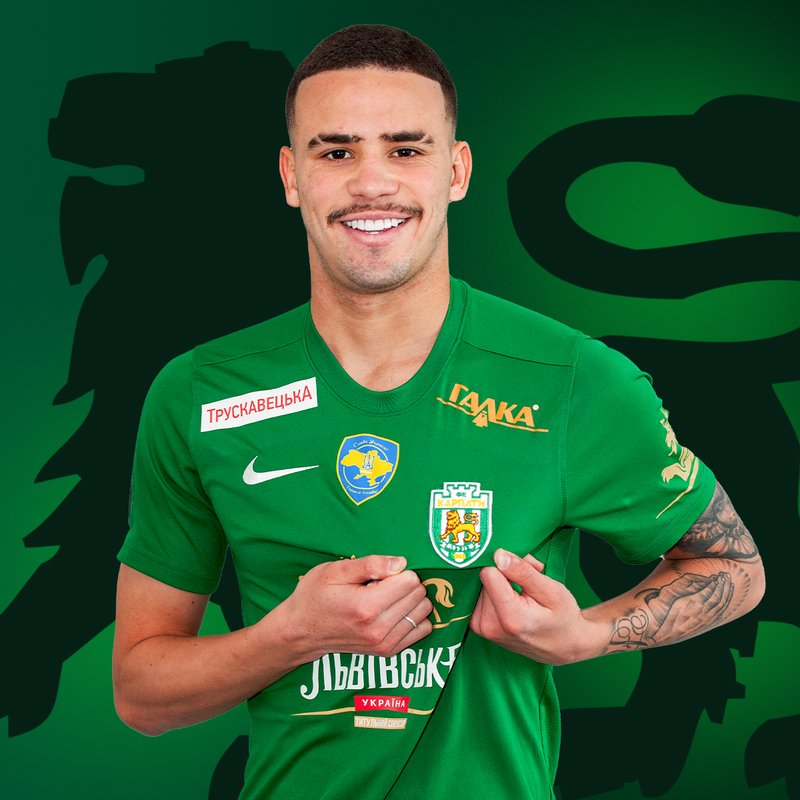

Personal information
- Full name: Arielson Sampaio Galvão
- Date of birth: 5 September 2004 (age 22)
- Place of birth: Porto Velho, Brazil
- Height: 1.80 m (5 ft 11 in)
- Position: Forward

Team information
- Current team: Damac
- Number: 99

Youth career
- 2019: Avaí Rondônia
- 2020–2023: Cruzeiro
- 2024–2025: Torreense U23

Senior career*
Years	Team	Apps	(Gls)
2023–2024	Cruzeiro	0	(0)
2023–2024	→ Polissya Zhytomyr (loan)	13	(1)
2024	→ Karpaty Lviv (loan)	3	(0)
2025–2026	Torreense	9	(0)
2026–	Damac	6	(1)
- * Club domestic league appearances and goals as of 22:01, 23 April 2026 (UTC)

Arielson Sampaio Galvão (born 5 September 2004) is a Brazilian footballer who plays as a forward for Saudi Pro League club Damac.

== Career ==
=== Cruzeiro ===
A youth product of Cruzeiro, Arielson scored 24 goals in 56 matches for Cruzeiro under-20s in two seasons. In May 2023, he was an unused substitute for the Cruziero first team, as they played against Fluminense, in the Brasileirão. In August 2023, he joined FC Polissya Zhytomyr of the Ukrainian Premier League, on a season-long loan.

==== Loans to Ukraine ====
He scored for Polissya Zhytomyr on his league debut for the club, on 18 August 2023, against LNZ Cherkasy, in a 2–1 away victory. The loan of Arielson to Polissia ended earlier than expected on 6 March 2024. Few days earlier, a rumor appeared of a possible signing with another Ukrainian club, Karpaty Lviv. A few days later it was confirmed that the player would remain in Ukraine as originally planned playing for a club from Lviv.
