= 2024–25 FC Shakhtar Donetsk season =

Shakhtar Donetsk
2024–25 season
- Chairman: Rinat Akhmetov
- Manager: Marino Pušić
- Stadium: Arena Lviv (League); Arena AufSchalke (Europe)
- Premier League: 3rd
- Ukrainian Cup: Champions
- UEFA Champions League: League phase
- Top goalscorer: League: Heorhiy Sudakov (13); All: Heorhiy Sudakov (15)
- Highest home attendance: 57,079 vs Bayern Munich (10 December 2024)
- Lowest home attendance: 645 vs Vorskla Poltava (5 December 2024)
- Average home league attendance: 1,432 (27 April 2025)
Home colours	Away colours	Third colours

The 2024–25 season was FC Shakhtar Donetsk's 34th season in existence and the club's 26th consecutive season in the top flight of Ukrainian football. In addition to the domestic league, Shakhtar Donetsk participated in the Ukrainian Cup and the UEFA Champions League. The season covered the period from 1 July 2024 to 30 June 2025.

== Season events ==
On 25 June, Shakhtar announced the signing of Kiril Fesyun from Kolos Kovalivka. The following day, 26 June, Shakhtar announced the signing of Alaa Ghram from CS Sfaxien and the departure of Denil Castillo to Midtjylland, on 1 July, in a permanent transfer.

On 30 June, Shakhtar announced that Yaroslav Rakitskyi had left the club as a free agent.

On 2 July, Shakhtar announced that they would play their European games this season at Schalke 04's Arena AufSchalke in Gelsenkirchen.

On 9 July, Shakhtar announced the signing of Bartol Franjić on a season-long loan deal from VfL Wolfsburg.

On 17 July, Shakhtar announced that they had signed a new contract with Vinicius Tobias, keeping the defender at the club until 30 June 2029.

On 29 July, Shakhtar announced that Giorgi Gocholeishvili had joined Copenhagen on loan for the season, with an option to make the move permanent.

On 4 January, Shakhtar announced that they had agreed to an early termination of Bartol Franjić's loan deal.

On 22 January, Shakhtar announced that Kevin Kelsy had left the club to sign permanently for Portland Timbers, and that Danylo Sikan had left the club to sign for Trabzonspor.

On 30 January, Shakhtar announced that Taras Stepanenko had left the club.

On 3 February, Shakhtar announced that Oleksandr Zubkov had left the club to sign for Trabzonspor.

On 7 February, Shakhtar announced the signing of Diego Arroyo from Club Bolívar on a contract until 31 December 2029.

On 8 February, Shakhtar announced the signing of Kauã Elias from Fluminense on a contract until 31 December 2029.

On 10 March, Shakhtar announced the signing of Alisson Santana from Atlético Mineiro on a contract until 31 December 2030.

On 24 May, following their last game of the season, Shakhtar announced that Marino Pušić had left the club.

On 27 May, Shakhtar announced Arda Turan as their new head coach, on a two-year contract.

On 17 June, Kevin was announced as the clubs player of the season.

== Squad ==
As of match played 24 May 2025

Number	Player	Nationality	Position	Date of birth (age)	Signed from	Signed in	Contract ends	Apps.	Goals
Goalkeepers
12	Tymur Puzankov	(Ukraine)	GK	4 March 2003 (aged 22)	Academy	2021		0	0
23	Kiril Fesyun	(Ukraine)	GK	7 August 2002 (aged 22)	Kolos Kovalivka	2024	2029	6	0
31	Dmytro Riznyk	(Ukraine)	GK	30 January 1999 (aged 26)	Vorskla Poltava	2023	2028	75	0
34	Rostyslav Bahlay	(Ukraine)	GK	1 February 2008 (aged 17)	Academy	2024		0	0
35	Vladyslav Kravets	(Ukraine)	GK	28 January 2005 (aged 20)	Academy	2021		0	0
48	Denys Tvardovskyi	(Ukraine)	GK	13 June 2003 (aged 21)	Academy	2023		3	0
Defenders
3	Diego Arroyo	(Bolivia)	DF	29 April 2005 (aged 20)	Club Bolívar	2025	2029	1	0
5	Valeriy Bondar	(Ukraine)	DF	27 February 1999 (aged 26)	Academy	2019		140	2
13	Pedro Henrique	(Brazil)	DF	11 July 2002 (aged 22)	Athletico Paranaense	2023	2028	42	0
16	Irakli Azarovi	(Georgia (country))	DF	21 February 2002 (aged 23)	Red Star Belgrade	2023	2028	47	0
17	Vinicius Tobias	(Brazil)	DF	23 February 2004 (aged 21)	Internacional	2022	2029	26	0
18	Alaa Ghram	(Tunisia)	DF	24 July 2001 (aged 23)	CS Sfaxien	2024	2029	13	0
22	Mykola Matviyenko	(Ukraine)	DF	2 May 1996 (aged 29)	Academy	2015	2027	132	16
26	Yukhym Konoplya	(Ukraine)	DF	26 August 1999 (aged 25)	Academy	2017		87	5
65	Mykola Ogarkov	(Ukraine)	DF	18 February 2005 (aged 20)	Academy	2024		1	0
74	Maryan Faryna	(Ukraine)	DF	28 August 2003 (aged 21)	Academy	2022		6	0
Midfielders
6	Marlon Gomes	(Brazil)	MF	14 December 2003 (aged 21)	Vasco da Gama	2024	2028	47	8
8	Dmytro Kryskiv	(Ukraine)	MF	6 October 2000 (aged 24)	Academy	2019		93	12
9	Maryan Shved	(Ukraine)	MF	16 July 1997 (aged 27)	KV Mechelen	2022	2027	43	8
10	Heorhiy Sudakov	(Ukraine)	MF	1 September 2002 (aged 22)	Academy	2020	2028	136	34
11	Kevin	(Brazil)	MF	4 January 2003 (aged 22)	Palmeiras	2024	2028	52	12
20	Anton Hlushchenko	(Ukraine)	MF	20 April 2004 (aged 21)	Academy	2022		6	1
21	Artem Bondarenko	(Ukraine)	MF	21 August 2000 (aged 24)	Academy	2020	2028	123	28
24	Viktor Tsukanov	(Ukraine)	MF	4 February 2006 (aged 19)	Academy	2024	2028	8	0
29	Yehor Nazaryna	(Ukraine)	MF	10 July 1997 (aged 27)	Zorya Luhansk	2022	2027	67	3
38	Pedrinho	(Brazil)	MF	13 April 1998 (aged 27)	Benfica	2021	2029	52	5
39	Newerton	(Brazil)	MF	3 June 2005 (aged 19)	São Paulo	2023	2028	43	5
Forwards
2	Lassina Traoré	(Burkina Faso)	FW	12 January 2001 (aged 24)	Ajax	2021	2026	96	24
7	Eguinaldo	(Brazil)	FW	9 August 2004 (aged 20)	Vasco da Gama	2023	2028	57	10
19	Kauã Elias	(Brazil)	FW	28 March 2006 (aged 19)	Fluminense	2025	2029	10	1
30	Alisson Santana	(Brazil)	FW	21 September 2005 (aged 19)	Atlético Mineiro	2025	2030	12	1
Also under contract
	Andriy Totovytskyi	(Ukraine)	MF	20 January 1993 (aged 32)	Kolos Kovalivka	2022	2025	19	1
Away on loan
3	Stav Lemkin	(Israel)	DF	2 April 2003 (aged 22)	Hapoel Tel Aviv	2023	2028	5	0
13	Giorgi Gocholeishvili	(Georgia (country))	DF	14 February 2001 (aged 24)	Saburtalo Tbilisi	2023	2027	36	1
20	Dmytro Topalov	(Ukraine)	MF	12 March 1998 (aged 27)	Academy	2017		18	0
25	Kyrylo Siheyev	(Ukraine)	MF	16 May 2004 (aged 21)	Academy	2021		0	0
32	Eduard Kozik	(Ukraine)	DF	19 April 2003 (aged 22)	Academy	2021		8	0
55	Luka Latsabidze	(Georgia (country))	DF	18 March 2004 (aged 21)	Dinamo Tbilisi	2024	2028	0	0
77	Khusrav Toirov	(Tajikistan)	MF	1 August 2004 (aged 20)	Atyrau	2023	2027	2	0
	Viktor Korniyenko	(Ukraine)	DF	14 February 1999 (aged 26)	Academy	2016		30	1
	Roman Savchenko	(Ukraine)	DF	17 February 2004 (aged 21)	Academy	2021		0	0
	Danylo Udod	(Ukraine)	DF	9 March 2004 (aged 21)	Academy	2021		0	0
	Maycon	(Brazil)	MF	15 July 1997 (aged 27)	Corinthians	2018	2025	98	8
	Oleh Ocheretko	(Ukraine)	MF	25 March 2003 (aged 22)	Academy	2020	2027	17	1
	Ivan Petryak	(Ukraine)	MF	13 March 1994 (aged 31)	Fehérvár	2022	2026	38	3
Players who left during the season
4	Bartol Franjić	(Croatia)	DF	14 January 2000 (aged 25)	on loan from VfL Wolfsburg	2024	2025	8	1
6	Taras Stepanenko	(Ukraine)	MF	8 August 1989 (aged 35)	Metalurh Zaporizhya	2010	2025	440	31
11	Oleksandr Zubkov	(Ukraine)	MF	3 August 1996 (aged 28)	Ferencváros	2022	2027	107	20
14	Danylo Sikan	(Ukraine)	FW	16 April 2001 (aged 24)	Karpaty Lviv	2019	2028	118	31
18	Kevin Kelsy	(Venezuela)	FW	27 July 2004 (aged 20)	Boston River	2023	2027	37	9

== Transfers ==
=== In ===
Date	Position	Nationality	Name	From	Fee	Ref.
25 June 2024	GK	(Ukraine)	Kiril Fesyun	Kolos Kovalivka	Undisclosed	
26 June 2024	DF	(Tunisia)	Alaa Ghram	CS Sfaxien	Undisclosed	
7 February 2025	DF	(Bolivia)	Diego Arroyo	Club Bolívar	Undisclosed	
8 February 2025	FW	(Brazil)	Kauã Elias	Fluminense	Undisclosed	
10 March 2025	FW	(Brazil)	Alisson Santana	Atlético Mineiro	Undisclosed	

=== Loans in ===
Date from	Position	Nationality	Name	From	Date to	Ref.
9 July 2024	DF	(Croatia)	Bartol Franjić	VfL Wolfsburg	4 January 2025	

=== Out ===
Date	Position	Nationality	Name	To	Fee	Ref.
1 July 2024	MF	(Ecuador)	Denil Castillo	Midtjylland	Undisclosed	
3 July 2024	DF	(Brazil)	Marlon	Al Ain	Undisclosed	
5 July 2024	DF	(Ukraine)	Oleksandr Drambayev	Kryvbas Kryvyi Rih	Undisclosed	
18 July 2024	DF	(Ukraine)	Andriy Buleza	Karpaty Lviv	Undisclosed	
22 January 2025	FW	(Ukraine)	Danylo Sikan	Trabzonspor	Undisclosed	
22 January 2025	FW	(Venezuela)	Kevin Kelsy	Portland Timbers	Undisclosed	
3 February 2025	MF	(Ukraine)	Oleksandr Zubkov	Trabzonspor	Undisclosed	

=== Loans out ===
Date from	Position	Nationality	Name	To	Date to	Ref.
24 August 2023	DF	(Ukraine)	Viktor Korniyenko	Vorskla Poltava	30 June 2025	
30 April 2024	FW	(Venezuela)	Kevin Kelsy	FC Cincinnati	31 December 2024	
12 July 2024	MF	(Tajikistan)	Khusrav Toirov	Atyrau	31 December 2024	
29 July 2024	DF	(Georgia (country))	Giorgi Gocholeishvili	Copenhagen	30 June 2025	
30 July 2024	DF	(Ukraine)	Roman Savchenko	Chornomorets Odesa	30 June 2025	
30 July 2024	DF	(Ukraine)	Danylo Udod	Chornomorets Odesa	30 June 2025	
10 August 2024	MF	(Ukraine)	Oleh Ocheretko	Karpaty Lviv	30 June 2025	
26 August 2024	MF	(Ukraine)	Kyrylo Siheyev	Chornomorets Odesa	30 June 2025	
28 August 2024	MF	(Ukraine)	Ivan Petryak	Chornomorets Odesa	30 June 2025	
3 September 2024	DF	(Georgia (country))	Luka Latsabidze	Chornomorets Odesa	30 June 2025	
4 September 2024	DF	(Israel)	Stav Lemkin	Maccabi Tel Aviv	30 June 2025	
25 February 2025	MF	(Tajikistan)	Khusrav Toirov	Chornomorets Odesa	30 June 2025	

=== Released ===
Date	Position	Nationality	Name	Joined	Date	Ref.
30 June 2024	DF	(Ukraine)	Yaroslav Rakitskyi	Chornomorets Odesa	28 March 2025	
30 January 2025	MF	(Ukraine)	Taras Stepanenko	Eyüpspor	1 February 2025	

== Friendlies ==
29 June 2024	Shakhtar Donetsk (Ukraine)	4–1	(Bosnia and Herzegovina) Sarajevo	Slovenia
18:30 EEST (UTC+3)	Sikan 12'; Kryskiv 32'; Traoré 67' (pen.); Eguinaldo 84'	Report	Oliveira 51'

6 July 2024	Hajduk Split (Croatia)	1–1	(Ukraine) Shakhtar Donetsk	Kranj, Slovenia
19:30 EEST (UTC+3)	Sahiti 13'	Report	Traoré 28'	Stadium: Stanko Mlakar Stadium; Attendance: 200

11 July 2024	Shakhtar Donetsk (Ukraine)	0–1	(Serbia) TSC	Kranj, Slovenia
17:30 EEST (UTC+3)		Report	Vulić 4'	Stadium: NNC Brdo

14 July 2024	Shakhtar Donetsk (Ukraine)	5–0	(Turkey) Çaykur Rizespor	Predoslje, Slovenia
18:00 EEST (UTC+3)	Nazaryna 11'; Tobias 17'; Kevin 54'; Matviyenko 81'; Hlushchenko 89' (pen.)	Report		Stadium: Brdo Stadium; Attendance: 100

17 July 2024	Shakhtar Donetsk (Ukraine)	1–0	(Turkey) Beşiktaş	Celje, Slovenia
15:00 EEST (UTC+3)	Eguinaldo 66'	Report		Stadium: Stadion Z'dežele; Attendance: 500

20 July 2024	Shakhtar Donetsk (Ukraine)	0–1	(England) Ipswich Town	Villach, Austria
EEST (UTC+3)		Report	Morsy 28'	Stadium: Sportzentrum Landskron; Attendance: 200

26 July 2024	Dinamo Zagreb (Croatia)	1–0	(Ukraine) Shakhtar Donetsk	Zagreb, Croatia
20:00 EEST (UTC+3)	Bočkaj 67'	Report		Stadium: Stadion Maksimir

27 July 2024	Dinamo Zagreb (Croatia)	2–2	(Ukraine) Shakhtar Donetsk	Zagreb, Croatia
20:00 EEST (UTC+3)	Petković 66' (pen.), 83' (pen.)	Report	Bondarenko 54'; Kevin 59'	Stadium: Stadion Maksimir; Attendance: 2,746

12 August 2024	Shakhtar Donetsk (Ukraine)	3–0	(Ukraine) Mariupol	Kyiv
13:00 EEST (UTC+3)	Pedrinho 3'; Franjić 14'; Traoré 87'	Report		Stadium: Svyatoshin Olympic Complex; Attendance: 0

9 January 2025	Shakhtar Donetsk (Ukraine)	2–2	(Croatia) Dinamo Zagreb	Antalya, Turkey
16:00 EET (UTC+2)	Kevin 14'; Stepanenko 84'	Report	Stojković 14'; Hoxha 95'	Stadium: Mardan Stadium

15 January 2025	Shakhtar Donetsk (Ukraine)	1–0	(Bulgaria) CSKA Sofia	Antalya, Turkey
12:00 EET (UTC+2)	Tsukanov 75'	Report		Stadium: Mardan Stadium

15 January 2025	Shakhtar Donetsk (Ukraine)	4–0	(Bulgaria) Ludogorets Razgrad	Antalya, Turkey
16:00 EET (UTC+2)	Gomes 17'; Kevin 27'; Eguinaldo 64'; Pedrinho 88'	Report		Stadium: Regnum Stadium

9 February 2025	Shakhtar Donetsk (Ukraine)	3–0	(Moldova) Zimbru Chișinău	Antalya, Turkey
14:30 EET (UTC+2)	Kevin 23'; Bondarenko 60' (pen.); Shved 86'	Report	Dahan (penalty missed) 48'	Stadium: Cullinan Football Complex

13 February 2025	Shakhtar Donetsk (Ukraine)	3–1	(Latvia) RFS	Antalya, Turkey
16:00 EET (UTC+2)	Shved 3'; Elias 20'; Traoré 65'	Report	Derkach 90'	Stadium: Titanic Deluxe

16 February 2025	Shakhtar Donetsk (Ukraine)	2–0	(Georgia (country)) Dila Gori	Antalya, Turkey
12:00 EET (UTC+2)	Henrique 58'; Traoré 64'	Report		Stadium: Titanic Deluxe

12 March 2025	Karpaty Lviv (Ukraine)	1–2	(Ukraine) Shakhtar Donetsk	Lviv
12:00 EET (UTC+2)	Pidlepenets 1'	Report	Hlushchenko 12'; Elias 82'	Stadium: Arena Lviv

== Competitions ==
=== Overall record ===
Competition	First match	Last match	Starting round	Final position	Record							
Competition	First match	Last match	Starting round	Final position	Pld	W	D	L	GF	GA	GD	Win %
Premier League	4 August 2024	24 May 2025	Matchday 1	3rd	30	18	8	4	69	26	+43	60.00
Ukrainian Cup	30 October 2024	14 May 2025	Round of 16	Winners	4	4	0	0	4	1	+3	100.00
Champions League	18 September 2024	29 January 2025	League phase	27th	8	2	1	5	8	16	−8	25.00
Total					42	24	9	9	81	43	+38	57.14

Last updated: 24 May 2025
Source: Results

=== Premier League ===
==== League table ====
Pos	Team	Pld	W	D	L	GF	GA	GD	Pts	Qualification or relegation
1	Dynamo Kyiv (C)	30	20	10	0	61	19	+42	70	Qualification for the Champions League second qualifying round
2	Oleksandriya	30	20	7	3	46	22	+24	67	Qualification for the Conference League second qualifying round
3	Shakhtar Donetsk	30	18	8	4	69	26	+43	62	Qualification for the Europa League first qualifying round (Note: Shakhtar Donetsk qualified for the Europa League first qualifying round by winning the 2024–25 Ukrainian Cup; the second Conference League spot was passed to the fourth-placed team.)
4	Polissya Zhytomyr	30	12	12	6	38	28	+10	48	Qualification for the Conference League second qualifying round
5	Kryvbas Kryvyi Rih	30	13	8	9	34	26	+8	47	

Source: upl.ua
Rules for classification: 1) Points; 2) Head-to-head points; 3) Head-to-head goal difference; 4) Head-to-head goals scored; 5) Goal difference; 6) Goals scored; 7) Draw or "Golden match" if two teams tied for title (Article 22, paragraph 3).
(C) Champions
Notes:

Teams that placed 13th and 14th in the 2024–25 Ukrainian Premier League played two-leg play-off with the third and fourth teams of the 2024–25 Ukrainian First League. As a result, both the Ukrainian First League teams (Metalist 1925 and Kudrivka) received promotion after beating the Ukrainian Premier League teams (Vorskla and Livyi Bereh), which in turn were relegated. Due to the Russian 2025 summer escalation and the Russian ballistic missile attack warnings, on 1 June 2025, both matches were suspended but later renewed.

Team 1	Agg.	Team 2	1st leg	2nd leg
Kudrivka	2–2 (4–3 p)	Vorskla Poltava	1–2	1–0
Livyi Bereh Kyiv	0–2	Metalist 1925 Kharkiv	0–1	0–1

=== First Semi-final ===
29 May 2025	Kudrivka	1–2	Vorskla Poltava	Kyiv
15:30	Kozak 83'	Report	Ndukve 23'; Pavlyuk 39'	Stadium: Obolon Arena; Attendance: 1,100; Referee: Dmytro Panchyshyn (Kharkiv)

1 June 2025	Vorskla Poltava	0–1 (3–4 p)	Kudrivka	Poltava
13:00		Report	Lytovchenko 9'	Stadium: Vorskla; Attendance: 2,204; Referee: Mykola Balakin (Kyiv oblast)
	Penalties
	Ndukve (penalty scored); Malysh (penalty scored); Iyede (penalty missed); Kane (penalty missed); Salabay (penalty scored); Sklyar (penalty missed)		(penalty scored) Tuzenko; (penalty missed) Storchous; (penalty scored) Shershen; (penalty scored) Potimkov; (penalty missed) Serdyuk; (penalty scored) Liehostayev

2–2 on aggregate; Kudrivka won 4–3 on penalties and promotion to Premier League. While, Vorskla lost 3–4 on penalties and relegation to First League

=== Second Semi-final ===
29 May 2025	Livyi Bereh Kyiv	0–1	Metalist 1925 Kharkiv	Hnidyn, Kyiv Oblast
18:00		Report	Moura 38'	Stadium: Arena Livyi Bereh; Attendance: 1,167; Referee: Viktor Kopiyevskyi (Kropyvnytskyi)

1 June 2025	Metalist 1925 Kharkiv	1–0	Livyi Bereh Kyiv	Hnidyn, Kyiv Oblast
15:30	Kalitvintsev 90'	Report		Stadium: Arena Livyi Bereh; Attendance: 1,800; Referee: Vitaliy Romanov (Dnipro)

Metalist 1925 Kharkiv won 2–0 on aggregate and promotion to Premier League. While, Livyi Bereh Kyiv lost 0–2 on aggregate and relegation to First League.

==== Results summary ====
Overall								Home						Away					
Pld	W	D	L	GF	GA	GD	Pts	W	D	L	GF	GA	GD	W	D	L	GF	GA	GD
30	18	8	4	69	26	+43	62	10	3	2	41	15	+26	8	5	2	28	11	+17

Last updated: 24 May 2025.
Source: Results

==== Results by round ====
Round	1	2	3	4	6	7	8	9	10	11	12	13	14	15	16	17	18	19	20	21	22	23	24	5	25	26	27	28	29	30
Ground	A	H	A	A	H	H	A	H	A	A	H	H	H	H	H	A	H	H	H	A	A	H	A	A	H	H	A	A	A	A
Result	W	L	W	L	W	W	D	W	W	D	W	W	W	D	W	L	W	W	D	D	W	W	W	W	L	D	W	D	W	D
Position	1	3	2	5	7	4	4	4	4	4	3	3	3	3	3	3	3	3	3	3	3	3	3	3	3	3	3	3	3	3

Updated to match(es) played on 24 May 2025. Source: Results
A = Away; H = Home; W = Win; D = Draw; L = Loss

==== Results ====
4 August 2024 1	Vorskla Poltava	0–5	Shakhtar Donetsk	Poltava
15:30 EEST (UTC+3)		Report	Matviyenko 8', 68'; Kevin (yellow card) 10'; Bondar (yellow card) 22'; Zubkov 31'; Sudakov 67' (pen.); Sikan 88'; Pedro Henrique (yellow card) 90'	Stadium: Oleksiy Butovsky Vorskla Stadium; Attendance: 2,632; Referee: Mykola Balakin

11 August 2024 2	Shakhtar Donetsk	0–1	Polissya Zhytomyr	Lviv
18:00 EEST (UTC+3)	Kevin (yellow card) 90+5'	Report	Chobotenko 35'; Hutsulyak (yellow card) 65'; Mykhaylichenko (yellow card) 72'; Volynets (yellow card) 23'	Stadium: Arena Lviv; Attendance: 1,185; Referee: Oleksandr Shandor

18 August 2024 3	Livyi Bereh Kyiv	0–1	Shakhtar Donetsk	Kyiv
18:00 EEST (UTC+3)	Dedukh (yellow card) 61'; Sokolov (yellow card) 80'; Sukhoruchko (yellow card) 87'; Synytsya (yellow card) 90'; Banada (yellow card) 90+2'	Report	Sikan 63'; Eguinaldo (yellow card) 90+1'	Stadium: Livyi Bereh Arena; Attendance: 1,279; Referee: Dmytro Panchyshyn

24 August 2024 4	Oleksandriya	4–3	Shakhtar Donetsk	Oleksandriia
13:00 EEST (UTC+3)	Filippov 37', 48' (pen.), 57'; Kalyuzhnyi 42'; Vashchenko (yellow card) 63'	Report	Shabanov 16' (o.g.); Kryskiv 25'; Pedrinho 90+5'	Stadium: CSC Nika Stadium; Attendance: 1,180; Referee: Vitalii Romanov

14 September 2024 6	Shakhtar Donetsk	5–2	Karpaty Lviv	Lviv
18:27 EEST (UTC+3)	Zubkov 21'; Kryskiv (yellow card) 28'; Bondarenko 29', 39', 65'; Sikan 43'; Pedro Henrique (yellow card) 64'; Kevin (yellow card) 66'	Report	Pidlepenets 25'; Chachua 83'; Miroshnichenko (yellow card) 90+3'	Stadium: Arena Lviv; Attendance: 1,319; Referee: Andrii Kovalenko
Note: Match started 27 minutes late due to an air-raid siren.

23 September 2024 7	Shakhtar Donetsk	4–0	Obolon Kyiv	Lviv
18:00 EEST (UTC+3)	Bondarenko 17'; Traoré 67'; Tobias (yellow card) 76'; Sudakov 78'; Newerton 90'	Report	Taranukha (yellow card) 20'; Medynskyi (yellow card) 33'; Sukhanov (yellow card) 72'; Karas (yellow card) 87'	Stadium: Arena Lviv; Attendance: 958; Referee: Roman Blavatskyi

27 September 2024 8	Veres Rivne	1–1	Shakhtar Donetsk	Rivne
18:00 EEST (UTC+3)	Hodya (yellow card) 22'; Sharay (yellow card) 71'; Klyots 81'	Report	Sudakov 65' (pen.)	Stadium: Avanhard Stadium; Attendance: 3,674; Referee: Maksym Kozyriatskyi

6 October 2024 9	Shakhtar Donetsk	5–1	LNZ Cherkasy	Lviv
15:30 EEST (UTC+3)	Sudakov 13', 50', 53', 57'; Zubkov 26'; Konoplya (yellow card) 62'; Marlon (yellow card) 90+2'	Report	Nonikashvili 61' (pen.); Momoh (yellow card) 88'	Stadium: Arena Lviv; Attendance: 1,028; Referee: Denys Shurman

18 October 2024 10	Kolos Kovalivka	0–1	Shakhtar Donetsk	Kovalivka
18:00 EEST (UTC+3)	Veleten (yellow card) 22'; Bolívar (yellow card) 29'; Diego (yellow card) 90+4'	Report	Matviyenko (yellow card) 36'; Bondarenko (yellow card) 43'; Sudakov (yellow card) 47'; Krasniqi 59' (o.g.)	Stadium: Kolos Stadium; Attendance: 700; Referee: Oleksii Derevinskyi

27 October 2024 11	Dynamo Kyiv	1–1	Shakhtar Donetsk	Kyiv
18:00 EET (UTC+2)	Andriyevskyi (yellow card) 62'; Karavayev 87'	Report	Zubkov (yellow card) 40'; Bondarenko 48'; Pedro Henrique (yellow card) 58'; Kryskiv (red card) 61'	Stadium: Valeriy Lobanovskyi Dynamo Stadium; Attendance: 3,500; Referee: Mykola Balakin

2 November 2024 12	Shakhtar Donetsk	2–1	Chornomorets Odesa	Lviv
18:00 EEST (UTC+3)	Zubkov 17'; Bondarenko 45+1'	Report	Habelok 20'	Stadium: Arena Lviv; Attendance: 967; Referee: Dmytro Panchyshyn

10 November 2024 13	Shakhtar Donetsk	3–1	Zorya Luhansk	Lviv
15:30 EET (UTC+2)	Bondarenko 52' (pen.); Kevin 54'; Jordan 90+3' (o.g.)	Report	Yatsyk 37'; Mićin (yellow card) 40'; Dryshlyuk (yellow card) 79'	Stadium: Arena Lviv; Attendance: 1,380; Referee: Oleksandr Afanasiev

23 November 2024 14	Shakhtar Donetsk	6–0	Inhulets Petrove	Lviv
18:00 EET (UTC+2)	Sudakov (yellow card) 32' (penalty missed) 42'; Bondarenko 45+1'; Franjić 47'; Kevin 50'; Eguinaldo 70', 82'; Zubkov 80'	Report	Volokhatyi (yellow card) 9'; Mysyk (yellow card) 53'; Mohylnyi (yellow card) 56'	Stadium: Arena Lviv; Attendance: 767; Referee: Oleksandr Kalonov

1 December 2024 15	Shakhtar Donetsk	1–1	Rukh Lviv	Lviv
18:00 EET (UTC+2)	Matviyenko 23'; Sudakov (yellow card) 45'	Report	Didyk (yellow card) 18' (goal) 90+2'; Krasnopir (yellow card) 30'; Slyubyk (yellow card) 45+1'	Stadium: Arena Lviv; Attendance: 1,280; Referee: Viktor Kopievskii

5 December 2024 16	Shakhtar Donetsk	3–1	Vorskla Poltava	Lviv
18:00 EET (UTC+2)	Newerton 14'; Sudakov 22'; Traoré 36'	Report	Nesterenko 77'	Stadium: Arena Lviv; Attendance: 645; Referee: Oleksii Derevinskyi

15 December 2024 17	Polissya Zhytomyr	1–0	Shakhtar Donetsk	Zhytomyr
18:00 EET (UTC+2)	Matić (yellow card) 13'; Taylor (yellow card) 48'; Sarapiy (yellow card) 61'; Mykhaylichenko 90+1'; Bristrić (yellow card) 90+5'	Report	Kryskiv (yellow card) 62'; Sikan (yellow card) 90+3'	Stadium: Tsentralnyi Stadion; Attendance: 2,100; Referee: Vitalii Romanov

24 February 2025 18	Shakhtar Donetsk	1–0	Livyi Bereh Kyiv	Lviv
18:00 EET (UTC+2)	Pedrinho (yellow card) 45'; Shved 61'; Bondar (yellow card) 70'; Kevin (yellow card) 88'	Report	Semenov (yellow card) 88'; Dedukh (yellow card) 88'	Stadium: Arena Lviv; Attendance: 1,238; Referee: Oleksandr Afanasiev

1 March 2025 19	Shakhtar Donetsk	3–0	Oleksandriya	Lviv
18:00 EET (UTC+2)	Kevin (yellow card) 55'; Matviyenko (yellow card) 63'; Sudakov 77', 90+3'; Eguinaldo 90'	Report	Kalyuzhnyi (yellow card) 52'; Myshnyov (yellow card) 68'	Stadium: Arena Lviv; Attendance: 1,320; Referee: Mykola Balakin

6 March 2025 20	Shakhtar Donetsk	1–1	Kryvbas Kryvyi Rih	Lviv
18:00 EET (UTC+2)	Pedro Henrique (yellow card) 48'; Bondarenko 67'; Marlon Gomes (yellow card) 68'	Report	Mykytyshyn (yellow card) 44'; Mendoza 57'; Lunyov (yellow card) 68'; Kuzyk (yellow card) 73'; Klishchuk (yellow card) 90+3'; Dibango (yellow card) 90+5'	Stadium: Arena Lviv; Attendance: 2,500; Referee: Oleksiy Derevinskyi

11 March 2025 21	Karpaty Lviv	0–0	Shakhtar Donetsk	Lviv
18:00 EET (UTC+2)	Tanda (yellow card) 16'; Sych (yellow card) 75'	Report	Marlon (yellow card) 35'; Matviyenko (yellow card) 79'	Stadium: Arena Lviv; Attendance: 3,250; Referee: Vitalii Romanov

29 March 2025 22	Obolon Kyiv	0–2	Shakhtar Donetsk	Kyiv
15:30 EET (UTC+2)	Vitenchuk (yellow card) 37'; Pryimak (yellow card) 44'	Report	Eguinaldo 23'; Hlushchenko 89'	Stadium: Obolon Arena; Attendance: 3,100; Referee: Andrii Kovalenko

6 April 2025 23	Shakhtar Donetsk	3–0	Veres Rivne	Lviv
18:00 EET (UTC+2)	Kevin 59'; Sudakov 88'; Traoré 90'	Report	Klyots (yellow card) 53'; Honcharenko (yellow card) 78'	Stadium: Arena Lviv; Attendance: 920; Referee: Denys Shurman

11 April 2025 24	LNZ Cherkasy	1–4	Shakhtar Donetsk	Cherkasy
15:30 EET (UTC+2)	Salihu 86'	Report	Marlon 7', 20'; Dajko 11' (o.g.); Traoré 90+1'	Stadium: Cherkasy Arena; Attendance: 1,650; Referee: Dmytro Panchyshyn

16 April 2025 5	Kryvbas Kryvyi Rih	1–2	Shakhtar Donetsk	Kryvyi Rih
14:00 EEST (UTC+3)	Bizimana (yellow card) 5'; Ilić (penalty missed) 77'; Tverdokhlib 85'; Vakulko (yellow card) 87'	Report	Matviyenko (yellow card) 38'; Stepanenko 40'; Kevin 62'	Stadium: Hirnyk Stadium; Attendance: 450; Referee: Denys Shurman
Note: Match originally scheduled for 1 September 2024, but abandoned in the 51st minute due to an air-raid siren. Remaining minutes were played on 16 April 2025.

19 April 2025 25	Shakhtar Donetsk	2–4	Kolos Kovalivka	Lviv
18:00 EET (UTC+2)	Marlon 44'; Tobias (yellow card) 86'; Kevin 90+5' (pen.)	Report	Rrapaj 26'; Tsurikov 38'; Veleten 84' (yellow card) 85'; Bolívar (yellow card) 86' (goal) 90+7'; Pakholyuk (yellow card) 90+10'	Stadium: Arena Lviv; Attendance: 1,117; Referee: Volodymyr Novohatnii

27 April 2025 26	Shakhtar Donetsk	2–2	Dynamo Kyiv	Lviv
18:00 EET (UTC+2)	Kevin 6' (pen.); Eguinaldo 20'; Alisson (yellow card) 78'	Report	Vanat 56'; Dubinchak (yellow card) 79'; Kabayev 90+3'	Stadium: Arena Lviv; Attendance: 4,850; Referee: Vitaliy Romanov

3 May 2025 27	Chornomorets Odesa	0–3	Shakhtar Donetsk	Odesa
13:00 EET	Biloshevskyi (yellow card) 65'	Report	Bondarenko 55'; Azarovi (yellow card) 56'; Newerton 71', 75'	Stadium: Chornomorets Stadium; Attendance: 0 Referee: Roman Blavatskyi

9 May 2025 28	Zorya Luhansk	0–0	Shakhtar Donetsk	Kyiv
15:30 EET (UTC+2)	Budkivskyi (yellow card) 11'; Dryshlyuk (yellow card) 57'; Bašić (yellow card) 83'; Juninho (yellow card) 83'	Report	Ghram (yellow card) 11' (yellow-red card) 17'	Stadium: Valeriy Lobanovskyi Dynamo Stadium; Attendance: 936; Referee: Oleksandr Sandor

18 May 2025 29	Inhulets Petrove	1–4	Shakhtar Donetsk	Lviv
15:30 EET (UTC+2)	Volokhatyi 17'	Report	Bondarenko 2', 90+1'; Tobias (yellow card) 41'; Sudakov 68', 70'	Stadium: Ukraina Stadium; Attendance: 114; Referee: Anastasiia Romaniuk

24 May 2025 30	Rukh Lviv	1–1	Shakhtar Donetsk	Lviv
15:30 EET (UTC+2)	Didyk (yellow card) 35'; Ryabov (yellow card) 40'; Horin (yellow card) 50'; Faal 58'; Kitela (yellow card) 62'; Runich (yellow card) 90+2'	Report	Eguinaldo 46'; Pedro Henrique (yellow card) 62'	Stadium: Arena Lviv; Attendance: 1,550; Referee: Viktor Kopievsky

=== Ukrainian Cup ===
30 October 2024 Round of 16	Shakhtar Donetsk	1–0	Zorya Luhansk	Lviv
18:00 EET (UTC+2)	Franjić (yellow card) 8'; Traoré 21'	Report	Slesar (yellow card) 54'; Eskinja (red card) 80'	Stadium: Arena Lviv; Attendance: 1,097; Referee: Denys Shurman

2 April 2025 Quarter-final	Oleksandriya	0–1 (a.e.t.)	Shakhtar Donetsk	Oleksandriia
14:00 EEST (UTC+3)	Campos (yellow card) 51'; Myshnyov (yellow card) 55'; Kalyuzhnyi (yellow card) 83'; Batata (yellow card) 84'; Smyrnyi (yellow card) 109'	Report	Henrique (yellow card) 7'; Nazaryna (yellow card) 24'; Pedrinho (yellow card) 36'; Kevin (yellow card) 54' (goal) 109'; Bondar (yellow card) 90'; Matviyenko (yellow card) 93'; Traoré (yellow card) 98'	Stadium: CSC Nika Stadium; Attendance: 1,180; Referee: Mykola Balakin

23 April 2025 Semi-final	Polissya Zhytomyr	0–1 (a.e.t.)	Shakhtar Donetsk	Zhytomyr
18:00 EEST (UTC+3)	Hutsulyak (yellow card) 50'; Sarapiy (yellow card) 57'; Babenko (yellow card) 102'; Mykhaylichenko (yellow card) 107'; Talles (yellow card) 120'; Bristrić (yellow card) 120+1'	Report	Tobias (yellow card) 103'; Alisson 114'	Stadium: Tsentralnyi Stadion; Attendance: 4,550; Referee: Dmytro Panchyshyn

14 May 2025 Final	Shakhtar Donetsk	1–1 (a.e.t.) (6–5 p)	Dynamo Kyiv	Zhytomyr
18:30 EEST (UTC+3)	Eguinaldo (yellow card) 34'; Marlon (yellow card) 53'; Kauã 64'	Report	Yarmolenko 43'; Vanat (yellow card) 53'; Yarmolenko (yellow card) 61'; Dubinchak (yellow card) 97'	Stadium: Tsentralnyi Stadion; Attendance: 4,740; Referee: Mykola Balakin
	Penalties
	Nazaryna (penalty scored); Alisson (penalty scored); Kevin (penalty scored); Kauã (penalty scored); Ghram (penalty scored); Kryskiv (penalty scored)		(penalty scored) Vanat; (penalty scored) Brazhko; (penalty scored) Vivcharenko; (penalty scored) Mykhailenko; (penalty scored) Pikhalyonok; (penalty missed) Karavayev

=== UEFA Champions League ===
==== League phase ====
Pos	Team	Pld	W	D	L	GF	GA	GD	Pts
25	(Croatian Football Federation) Dinamo Zagreb	8	3	2	3	12	19	−7	11
26	(German Football Association) VfB Stuttgart	8	3	1	4	13	17	−4	10
27	(Ukrainian Association of Football) Shakhtar Donetsk	8	2	1	5	8	16	−8	7
28	(Italian Football Federation) Bologna	8	1	3	4	4	9	−5	6
29	(Football Association of Serbia) Red Star Belgrade	8	2	0	6	13	22	−9	6

Source: UEFA
Rules for classification: League phase tiebreakers

Round	1	2	3	4	5	6	7	8
Ground	A	H	A	H	A	H	H	A
Result	D	L	L	W	L	L	W	L
Position	21	27	29	28	26	27	27	27

Updated to match(es) played on 29 January 2025. Source: Results
A = Away; H = Home; W = Win; D = Draw; L = Loss

18 September 2024 1	Bologna (Italy)	0–0	(Ukraine) Shakhtar Donetsk	Bologna, Italy
19:45 EEST (UTC+3)	Posch (yellow card) 3'; Castro (yellow card) 58'	Report	Sudakov (penalty missed) 4'; Bondar (yellow card) 12'; Tobias (yellow card) 70'; Stepanenko (yellow card) 84'; Marlon (yellow card) 88'	Stadium: Stadio Renato Dall'Ara; Attendance: 23,130; Referee: Rohit Saggi (Norway)

2 October 2024 2	Shakhtar Donetsk (Ukraine)	0–3	(Italy) Atalanta	Gelsenkirchen, Germany
19:45 EEST (UTC+3)	Ghram (yellow card) 20'	Report	Djimsiti 21'; Lookman 44'; Bellanova 48'; Zaniolo (yellow card) 78'; Éderson (yellow card) 84'	Stadium: Arena AufSchalke; Attendance: 21,636; Referee: João Pinheiro (Portugal)
Note: Due to the Russian invasion of Ukraine, Ukrainian teams are required to play their home matches at neutral venues until further notice. Therefore, Shakhtar Donetsk will play their home matches at Arena AufSchalke, Gelsenkirchen, Germany, instead of their regular stadium, Donbas Arena, Donetsk.

22 October 2024 3	Arsenal (England)	1–0	(Ukraine) Shakhtar Donetsk	London, England
22:00 EEST (UTC+3)	Riznyk 29' (o.g.); White (yellow card) 34'; Trossard (penalty missed) 77'; Martinelli (yellow card) 84'	Report	Pedro Henrique (yellow card) 90+6'	Stadium: Emirates Stadium; Attendance: 59,594; Referee: Benoît Bastien (France)

6 November 2024 4	Shakhtar Donetsk (Ukraine)	2–1	(Switzerland) Young Boys	Gelsenkirchen, Germany
19:45 EET (UTC+2)	Zubkov 31'; Sudakov 41'; Konoplya (yellow card) 81'	Report	Imeri 27'; Blum (yellow card) 40'; Athekame (yellow card) 45+3'; Niasse (yellow card) 70'	Stadium: Arena AufSchalke; Attendance: 17,420; Referee: Orel Grinfeld (Israel)
Note: Due to the Russian invasion of Ukraine, Ukrainian teams are required to play their home matches at neutral venues until further notice. Therefore, Shakhtar Donetsk will play their home matches at Arena AufSchalke, Gelsenkirchen, Germany, instead of their regular stadium, Donbas Arena, Donetsk.

27 November 2024 5	PSV Eindhoven (Netherlands)	3–2	(Ukraine) Shakhtar Donetsk	Eindhoven, Netherlands
22:00 EET (UTC+2)	Boscagli (yellow card) 59'; Saibari (yellow card) 84'; Tillman 87', 90' (yellow card) 90+1'; Pepi 90+5'	Report	Sikan 8'; Zubkov 37'; Pedro Henrique (red card) 69'; Kryskiv (yellow card) 87'	Stadium: Philips Stadion; Attendance: 35,100; Referee: Urs Schnyder (Switzerland)

10 December 2024 6	Shakhtar Donetsk (Ukraine)	1–5	(Germany) Bayern Munich	Gelsenkirchen, Germany
22:00 EET (UTC+2)	Kevin 5'; Kryskiv (yellow card) 55'; Traoré (yellow card) 82'	Report	Sané (yellow card) 7'; Laimer 11'; Müller 45'; Olise 70' (pen.), 90+3'; Goretzka (yellow card) 82'; Musiala 87'	Stadium: Arena AufSchalke; Attendance: 57,079; Referee: Halil Umut Meler (Turkey)
Note: Due to the Russian invasion of Ukraine, Ukrainian teams are required to play their home matches at neutral venues until further notice. Therefore, Shakhtar Donetsk will play their home matches at Arena AufSchalke, Gelsenkirchen, Germany, instead of their regular stadium, Donbas Arena, Donetsk.

22 January 2025 7	Shakhtar Donetsk (Ukraine)	2–0	(France) Brest	Gelsenkirchen, Germany
19:45 EET (UTC+2)	Kevin 18'; Sudakov 37' (pen.); Stepanenko (yellow card) 77'	Report	Ndiaye (yellow card) 22'	Stadium: Arena AufSchalke; Attendance: 15,282; Referee: Sandro Schärer (Switzerland)
Note: Due to the Russian invasion of Ukraine, Ukrainian teams are required to play their home matches at neutral venues until further notice. Therefore, Shakhtar Donetsk will play their home matches at Arena AufSchalke, Gelsenkirchen, Germany, instead of their regular stadium, Donbas Arena, Donetsk.

29 January 2025 8	Borussia Dortmund (Germany)	3–1	(Ukraine) Shakhtar Donetsk	Dortmund, Germany
22:00 EET (UTC+2)	Guirassy 17', 44'; Beier (yellow card) 27'; Bensebaini 79'	Report	Kevin (yellow card) 25'; Marlon 50' (yellow card) 58'	Stadium: Westfalenstadion; Attendance: 81,365; Referee: Glenn Nyberg (Sweden)

== Squad statistics ==
As of match played 24 May 2025

=== Appearances and goals ===
No.	Pos	Nat	Player	Total		Premier League		Ukrainian Cup		UEFA Champions League	
No.	Pos	Nat	Player	Apps	Goals	Apps	Goals	Apps	Goals	Apps	Goals
2	FW	(Burkina Faso) BFA	Lassina Traoré	31	5	9+13	4	1+2	1	0+6	0
3	DF	(Bolivia) BOL	Diego Arroyo	1	0	0+1	0	0	0	0	0
5	DF	(Ukraine) UKR	Valeriy Bondar	39	0	27	0	4	0	8	0
6	MF	(Brazil) BRA	Marlon Gomes	34	4	15+8	3	4	0	4+3	1
7	FW	(Brazil) BRA	Eguinaldo	36	6	12+14	6	3	0	5+2	0
8	MF	(Ukraine) UKR	Dmytro Kryskiv	34	1	19+5	1	0+2	0	7+1	0
9	MF	(Ukraine) UKR	Maryan Shved	11	1	4+7	1	0	0	0	0
10	MF	(Ukraine) UKR	Heorhiy Sudakov	37	15	24+1	13	2+2	0	8	2
11	MF	(Brazil) BRA	Kevin	35	9	21+3	6	4	1	5+2	2
13	DF	(Brazil) BRA	Pedro Henrique	30	0	17+4	0	3	0	5+1	0
16	DF	(Georgia (country)) GEO	Irakli Azarovi	15	0	12	0	1	0	2	0
17	DF	(Brazil) BRA	Vinicius Tobias	26	0	18+1	0	4	0	2+1	0
18	DF	(Tunisia) TUN	Alaa Ghram	13	0	6+2	0	1+2	0	2	0
19	FW	(Brazil) BRA	Kauã Elias	10	1	3+6	0	0+1	1	0	0
20	MF	(Ukraine) UKR	Anton Hlushchenko	5	1	0+4	1	0+1	0	0	0
21	MF	(Ukraine) UKR	Artem Bondarenko	41	12	26+3	12	3+1	0	5+3	0
22	DF	(Ukraine) UKR	Mykola Matviyenko	33	3	22	3	3	0	8	0
23	GK	(Ukraine) UKR	Kiril Fesyun	6	0	5+1	0	0	0	0	0
24	MF	(Ukraine) UKR	Viktor Tsukanov	4	0	0+3	0	0+1	0	0	0
26	DF	(Ukraine) UKR	Yukhym Konoplya	20	0	12+1	0	0	0	5+2	0
29	MF	(Ukraine) UKR	Yehor Nazaryna	18	0	4+10	0	1+3	0	0	0
30	FW	(Brazil) BRA	Alisson Santana	12	1	3+6	0	0+3	1	0	0
31	GK	(Ukraine) UKR	Dmytro Riznyk	36	0	24	0	4	0	8	0
38	MF	(Brazil) BRA	Pedrinho	33	1	14+11	1	4	0	2+2	0
39	MF	(Brazil) BRA	Newerton	22	4	6+11	4	0+1	0	0+4	0
48	GK	(Ukraine) UKR	Denys Tvardovskyi	1	0	1	0	0	0	0	0
65	DF	(Ukraine) UKR	Mykola Ogarkov	1	0	0+1	0	0	0	0	0
74	DF	(Ukraine) UKR	Maryan Faryna	4	0	2+2	0	0	0	0	0
Players away on loan:
Players who left Shakhtar Donetsk during the season:
4	DF	(Croatia) CRO	Bartol Franjić	8	1	3+2	1	1	0	0+2	0
6	MF	(Ukraine) UKR	Taras Stepanenko	16	1	1+8	1	1	0	1+5	0
11	MF	(Ukraine) UKR	Oleksandr Zubkov	21	7	10+2	5	0+1	0	7+1	2
14	FW	(Ukraine) UKR	Danylo Sikan	19	4	9+4	3	0+1	0	4+1	1

=== Goalscorers ===
Place	Position	Nation	Number	Name	Premier League	Ukrainian Cup	Champions League	Total
1	MF	(Ukraine)	10	Heorhiy Sudakov	13	0	2	15
2	MF	(Ukraine)	21	Artem Bondarenko	12	0	0	12
3	MF	(Brazil)	11	Kevin	6	1	2	9
4	MF	(Ukraine)	11	Oleksandr Zubkov	5	0	2	7
5	FW	(Brazil)	7	Eguinaldo	6	0	0	6
6	FW	(Burkina Faso)	2	Lassina Traoré	4	1	0	5
7	MF	(Brazil)	39	Newerton	4	0	0	4
7	FW	(Ukraine)	14	Danylo Sikan	3	0	1	4
7	MF	(Brazil)	6	Marlon Gomes	3	0	1	4
7				Own goal	4	0	0	4
11	DF	(Ukraine)	22	Mykola Matviyenko	3	0	0	3
12	MF	(Ukraine)	8	Dmytro Kryskiv	1	0	0	1
12	MF	(Brazil)	38	Pedrinho	1	0	0	1
12	DF	(Croatia)	4	Bartol Franjić	1	0	0	1
12	MF	(Ukraine)	9	Maryan Shved	1	0	0	1
12	MF	(Ukraine)	20	Anton Hlushchenko	1	0	0	1
12	MF	(Ukraine)	6	Taras Stepanenko	1	0	0	1
12	FW	(Brazil)	30	Alisson Santana	0	1	0	1
12	FW	(Brazil)	19	Kauã Elias	0	1	0	1
TOTALS					69	4	8	81

=== Clean sheets ===
Place	Position	Nation	Number	Name	Premier League	Ukrainian Cup	Champions League	Total
1	GK	(Ukraine)	31	Dmytro Riznyk	10	4	2	16
2	GK	(Ukraine)	23	Kiril Fesyun	2	0	0	2
TOTALS					12	4	2	18

=== Disciplinary record ===
Number	Nation	Position	Name	Premier League		Ukrainian Cup		Champions League		Total	
Number	Nation	Position	Name	Yellow card	Red card	Yellow card	Red card	Yellow card	Red card	Yellow card	Red card
2	(Burkina Faso)	FW	Lassina Traoré	0	0	1	0	1	0	2	0
5	(Ukraine)	DF	Valeriy Bondar	2	0	1	0	1	0	4	0
6	(Brazil)	MF	Marlon Gomes	3	0	1	0	2	0	6	0
7	(Brazil)	FW	Eguinaldo	1	0	1	0	0	0	2	0
8	(Ukraine)	MF	Dmytro Kryskiv	2	1	0	0	2	0	4	1
10	(Ukraine)	MF	Heorhiy Sudakov	3	0	0	0	0	0	3	0
11	(Brazil)	MF	Kevin	5	0	1	0	1	0	7	0
13	(Brazil)	DF	Pedro Henrique	5	0	1	0	1	1	7	1
16	(Georgia (country))	DF	Irakli Azarovi	1	0	0	0	0	0	1	0
17	(Brazil)	DF	Vinicius Tobias	3	0	1	0	1	0	5	0
18	(Tunisia)	DF	Alaa Ghram	2	1	0	0	1	0	3	1
21	(Ukraine)	MF	Artem Bondarenko	1	0	0	0	0	0	1	0
22	(Ukraine)	DF	Mykola Matviyenko	5	0	1	0	0	0	6	0
26	(Ukraine)	DF	Yukhym Konoplya	1	0	0	0	1	0	2	0
29	(Ukraine)	MF	Yehor Nazaryna	0	0	1	0	0	0	1	0
30	(Brazil)	FW	Alisson Santana	1	0	0	0	0	0	1	0
38	(Brazil)	MF	Pedrinho	1	0	1	0	0	0	2	0
Players away on loan:
Players who left Shakhtar Donetsk during the season:
4	(Croatia)	DF	Bartol Franjić	0	0	1	0	0	0	1	0
6	(Ukraine)	MF	Taras Stepanenko	0	0	0	0	2	0	2	0
11	(Ukraine)	MF	Oleksandr Zubkov	1	0	0	0	0	0	1	0
14	(Ukraine)	FW	Danylo Sikan	1	0	0	0	0	0	1	0
			TOTALS	38	2	11	0	13	1	62	3
