= Diego Arroyo =

Bolivian footballer (born 2005)

Personal information
- Full name: Diego Júnior Arroyo Maldonado
- Date of birth: 29 April 2005 (age 21)
- Place of birth: Santa Cruz, Bolivia
- Height: 1.88 m (6 ft 2 in)
- Position: Defender

Team information
- Current team: Hapoel Petah Tikva (on loan from Shakhtar Donetsk)
- Number: 4

Youth career
- Tahuichi Academy
- Bolivar

Senior career*
Years	Team	Apps	(Gls)
2024–2025	Bolivar	3	(0)
2025–	Shakhtar Donetsk	2	(0)
2026–	→ Hapoel Petah Tikva (loan)	3	(0)

International career^{‡}
- Bolivia U20
2025–	Bolivia	9	(0)
- * Club domestic league appearances and goals as of 18:28, 18 September 2026 (UTC) ‡ National team caps and goals as of 30 September 2026

Diego Júnior Arroyo Maldonado (born 29 April 2005) is a Bolivian footballer who plays as a defender for Hapoel Petah Tikva and the Bolivia national football team.

== Club career ==
He is from Santa Cruz in Bolivia. He was a member of the Tahuichi Academy before joining up with Club Bolívar.

He joined Shakhtar Donetsk in Ukraine in February 2025, signing a five-year contract and was given the number three shirt number, but initially linked up with their U19 team. Shakhtar Donetsk were reported to have paid more than $1 million for Arroyo, despite the fact he had played only three matches and a total of 112 minutes in the Bolivian First Division. The fee made him one of the most expensive transfers of a Bolivian footballer, only behind the transfers of Marcelo Martins, Juan Manuel Peña and Ronald Raldes. The Tahuichi Academy also received a proportion of the transfer fee. After Martins, he became only the second Bolivian player to sign for Shakhtar Donetsk. The following month, he began to be included in the Shakhtar first-team match day squads. He made his competitive debut as a second-half substitute in a 4–1 victory over Inhulets Petrove in the Ukrainian Premier League on 18 May 2025.

On August 23rd Arroyo signed a one-year loan to Israeli club Hapoel Petah Tikva.

== International career ==
He played for the Bolivia national under-20 football team in the 2025 South American U-20 Championship in Colombia. He was called up by the senior Bolivia national football team for their 2026 FIFA World Cup qualification matches in March 2025. He made his senior Bolivia debut on 6 June 2025 as a second-half substitute against Venezuela in CONMEBOL World Cup qualifying.

== Career statistics ==
=== Club ===
As of match played 18 September 2026

Appearances and goals by club, season and competition
Club	Season	League			National cup		Continental		Total	
Club	Season	Division	Apps	Goals	Apps	Goals	Apps	Goals	Apps	Goals
Bolivar	2024	FBF División Profesional	3	0	—		—		3	0
Shakhtar Donetsk	2024–25	Ukrainian Premier League	1	0	—		—		1	0
Shakhtar Donetsk	2025–26	Ukrainian Premier League	1	0	0	0	0	0	1	0
Shakhtar Donetsk	Total		2	0	0	0	0	0	2	0
Hapoel Petah Tikva (loan)	2026–27	Israeli Premier League	3	0	0	0	—		3	0
Career total			8	0	0	0	0	0	8	0

=== International ===
As of match played 30 September 2026

Appearances and goals by national team and year
National team	Year	Apps	Goals
Bolivia	2025	5	0
Bolivia	2026	4	0
Total		9	0

== Honours ==
Club Bolívar

- FBF División Profesional: 2024

Shakhtar Donetsk

- Ukrainian Premier League: 2025–26
- Ukrainian Cup: 2024–25
