= Viktor Tsukanov =

Ukrainian footballer

Personal information
- Full name: Viktor Mykhaylovych Tsukanov
- Date of birth: 4 February 2006 (age 20)
- Place of birth: Kirovohrad, Ukraine
- Height: 1.74 m (5 ft 9 in)
- Position: Central midfielder

Team information
- Current team: Shakhtar Donetsk
- Number: 24

Youth career
- 2012–2017: Lider Kropyvnytskyi
- 2017–2019: Zirka Kropyvnytskyi
- 2019–2024: Shakhtar Donetsk

Senior career*
Years	Team	Apps	(Gls)
2024–	Shakhtar Donetsk	11	(0)

International career^{‡}
2022	Ukraine U17	1	(0)
2024	Ukraine U19	13	(0)
2025	Ukraine U20	1	(0)
- * Club domestic league appearances and goals as of 14 September 2026 ‡ National team caps and goals as of 10 June 2025

Viktor Mykhaylovych Tsukanov (Ukrainian: Віктор Михайлович Цуканов; born 4 February 2006) is a Ukrainian professional footballer who plays as a central midfielder for Shakhtar Donetsk in the Ukrainian Premier League.

== Career ==
Born in Kirovohrad, Tsukanov trained with the local Lider Kropyvnytskyi and Zirka Kropyvnytskyi, and in 2019 joined the Shakhtar Donetsk youth academy.

He made his debut for Shakhtar Donetsk in the Ukrainian Premier League as a second-half substitute against Kryvbas Kryvyi Rih on 3 March 2024.

== International career ==
In February 2023, Tsukanov was called up to the final squad of the Ukraine national under-17 football team to play in the 2023 UEFA European Under-17 Championship qualification elit round matches, but not played any match.

In March 2024, he was called up by manager Dmytro Mykhaylenko to the final squad of the Ukraine national under-19 football team to play in the 2024 UEFA European Under-19 Championship elit round matches.

== Career statistics ==
As of match played 17 September 2026

Appearances and goals by club, season and competition
Club	Season	League			Cup		Europe		Other		Total	
Club	Season	Division	Apps	Goals	Apps	Goals	Apps	Goals	Apps	Goals	Apps	Goals
Shakhtar Donetsk	2024–25	Ukrainian Premier League	7	0	3	0	—		—		10	0
Shakhtar Donetsk	2025–26	Ukrainian Premier League	3	0	0	0	0	0	—		3	0
Shakhtar Donetsk	2026–27	Ukrainian Premier League	2	0	1	1	0	0	—		3	1
Career total			12	0	4	1	0	0	0	0	16	1

== Honours ==
Shakhtar Donetsk

- Ukrainian Cup: 2024–25
