= Alaa Ghram =

Tunisian footballer (born 2001)

Personal information
- Date of birth: 24 July 2001 (age 25)
- Place of birth: Sfax, Tunisia
- Height: 1.90 m (6 ft 3 in)
- Position: Central defender

Team information
- Current team: Shakhtar Donetsk
- Number: 18

Youth career
- Sfax RS
- 2018–2019: CS Sfaxien

Senior career*
Years	Team	Apps	(Gls)
2019–2024	CS Sfaxien	72	(5)
2024–	Shakhtar Donetsk	22	(1)

International career^{‡}
2020–2021	Tunisia U20	7	(0)
2023–	Tunisia	7	(0)
- * Club domestic league appearances and goals as of 30 October 2026 ‡ National team caps and goals as of 31 March 2026

Alaa Ghram (Arabic: عَلَاء غَرَام; born 24 July 2001) is a Tunisian professional footballer who plays as a central defender for Ukrainian Premier League Club Shakhtar Donetsk and the Tunisia national team.

== Early life ==
Ghram was born in Sfax, Tunisia. As a youth player, he joined the youth academy of Sfax Railways Sports.

== Club career ==
Ghram started his career with Tunisian side CS Sfaxien. In 2021, he suffered a ruptured cruciate ligament which caused him ton receive surgery. That year, his contract was also renewed until June 2024. In 2022, he received interest from a Qatari team. In 2023, he received interest from clubs in France.

On 26 June 2024 Ghram transferred to Ukrainian Premier League champions Shakhtar Donetsk, signing a five-year contract.

== International career ==
Ghram was called up for the first time to the Tunisian national team squad during the Kirin Cup Soccer in Japan and did not participate in either match. He made his debut with Tunisia as a late substitute in a 1–0 2023 Africa Cup of Nations qualification win over Libya on 28 March 2023 in Bengazi.

== Style of play ==
He can operate in several defensive positions as a defensive midfield or as a pivotal defender, and he is known for his "high fighting spirit".

== Career statistics ==
=== Club ===
As of 30 October 2026

Appearances and goals by club, season and competition
Club	Season	League			Cup		Continental		Other		Total	
Club	Season	Division	Apps	Goals	Apps	Goals	Apps	Goals	Apps	Goals	Apps	Goals
CS Sfaxien	2018–19	Tunisian Ligue Professionnelle 1	6	0	2	0	0	0	—		8	0
CS Sfaxien	2019–20	Tunisian Ligue Professionnelle 1	4	0	0	0	1 (Note: Appearances in CAF Confederation Cup)	0	—		5	0
CS Sfaxien	2020–21	Tunisian Ligue Professionnelle 1	3	0	0	0	2 (Note: Appearances in CAF Champions League)	0	—		5	0
CS Sfaxien	2021–22	Tunisian Ligue Professionnelle 1	17	0	2	0	10	0	1 (Note: Appearance in Tunisian Super Cup)	0	30	0
CS Sfaxien	2022–23	Tunisian Ligue Professionnelle 1	26	1	3	0	4	0	—		33	1
CS Sfaxien	2023–24	Tunisian Ligue Professionnelle 1	16	4	1	0	—		3 (Note: Appearances in Arab Club Champions Cup)	0	20	4
CS Sfaxien	Total		72	5	8	0	17	0	4	0	101	5
Shakhtar Donetsk	2024–25	Ukrainian Premier League	8	0	3	0	2 (Note: Appearances in UEFA Champions League)	0	0	0	13	0
Shakhtar Donetsk	2025–26	Ukrainian Premier League	9	1	1	0	7 (Note: One appearance in UEFA Europa League, six appearances in UEFA Conference League)	0	—		17	1
Shakhtar Donetsk	2026–27	Ukrainian Premier League	5	0	1	0	0	0	—		6	0
Shakhtar Donetsk	Total		22	1	5	0	9	0	0	0	36	1
Career total			89	6	10	0	26	0	4	0	137	6

=== International ===
As of match played 31 March 2026

Appearances and goals by national team and year
National team	Year	Apps	Goals
Tunisia	2023	2	0
Tunisia	2024	2	0
Tunisia	2025	2	0
Tunisia	2026	1	0
Total		7	0

== Honours ==
CS Sfaxien

- Tunisian Cup: 2018–19, 2020–21, 2021–22

Tunisia

- Kirin Cup Soccer: 2022

Shakhtar Donetsk

- Ukrainian Cup: 2024–25
