= Kevin (footballer, born 2003) =

Brazilian footballer

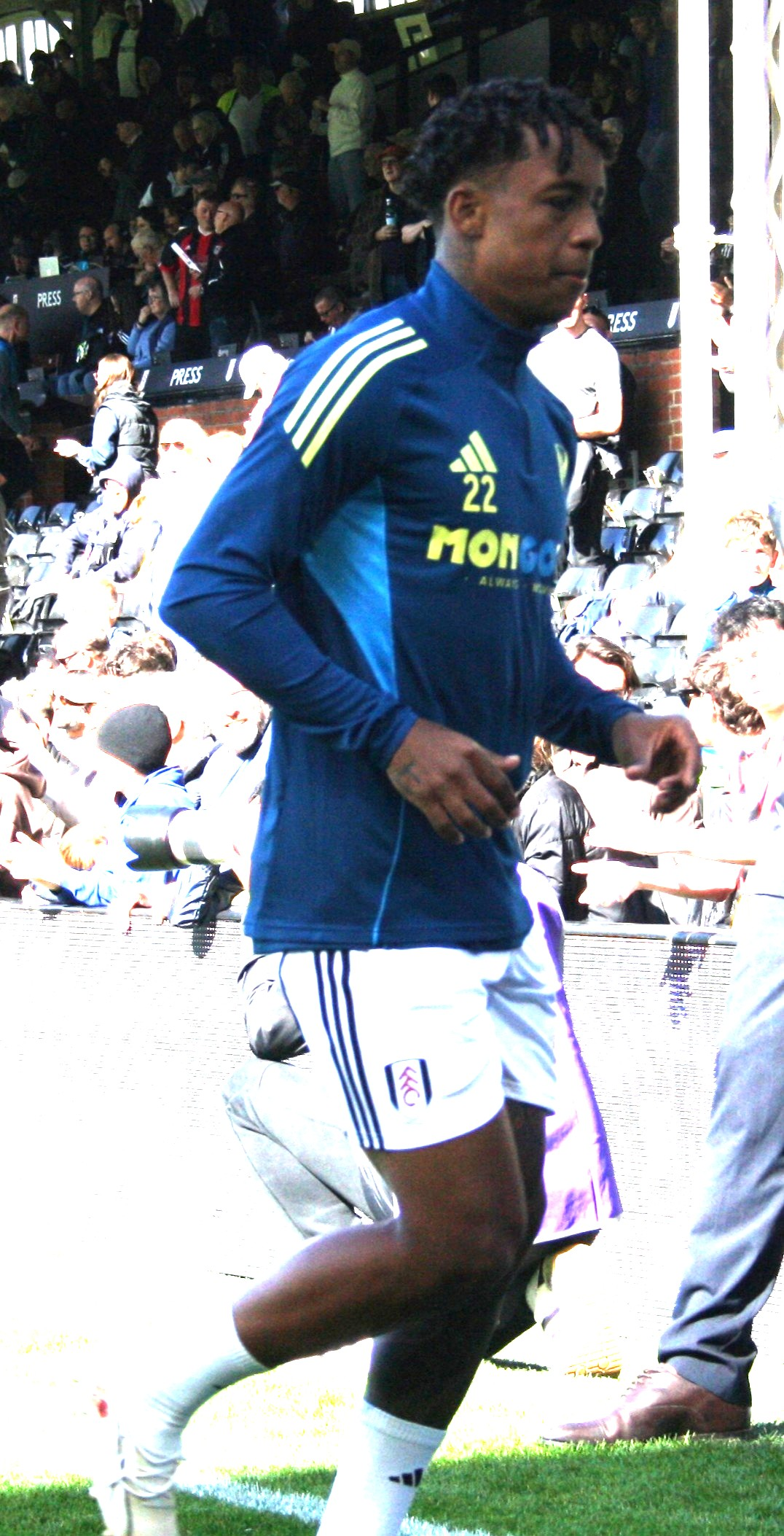
- Kevin with Fulham in 2025

Personal information
- Full name: Kevin Santos Lopes de Macedo
- Date of birth: 4 January 2003 (age 23)
- Place of birth: São Paulo, Brazil
- Height: 1.76 m (5 ft 9 in)
- Position: Winger

Team information
- Current team: Fulham
- Number: 11

Youth career
- 2015–2020: Desportivo Brasil
- 2020: → Palmeiras (loan)
- 2021–2023: Palmeiras

Senior career*
Years	Team	Apps	(Gls)
2020	Desportivo Brasil	4	(0)
2021–2024	Palmeiras	9	(1)
2024–2025	Shakhtar Donetsk	38	(9)
2025–	Fulham	30	(1)

International career^{‡}
2021–2022	Brazil U20	5	(0)
- * Club domestic league appearances and goals as of 10 October 2026 ‡ National team caps and goals as of 3 June 2023

Kevin Santos Lopes de Macedo (born 4 January 2003), simply known as Kevin, is a Brazilian professional footballer who plays as a winger for Premier League club Fulham.

== Early life ==
Kevin grew up in Itaim Paulista, a district of São Paulo, starting to play football in Porto Feliz's Desportivo Brasil, after refusing an Atlético Mineiro contract as an under-13, with the club being too far from his home.

In 2020, he joined the Palmeiras youth system. In January 2023, he helped the Palmeiras U20 win the Copa São Paulo de Futebol Júnior, earning Player of the Tournament honours, after scoring five goals and adding five assists in eight matches.

== Club career ==
=== Palmeiras ===
After playing the Campeonato Paulista Série A3 with Desportivo Brasil, Kevin joined Palmeiras's under-20 in 2020, on a one-year loan with a buyout clause that eventually resulted in a permanent transfer.

He made his professional debut for Palmeiras on 1 December 2021, replacing Giovani during a 3–1 Serie A away win against Cuiabá. He started his first game on the 10 December 2021, also scoring his first senior goal on this occasion, the winner of a 1–0 home win against Ceará concluding the league season of the recent Copa Libertadores winners.

=== Shakhtar Donetsk ===
On 19 January 2024, Kevin signed a four-and-a-half-year contract with Ukrainian Premier League club Shakhtar Donetsk, for a reported transfer fee of €12 million + €3 million in add-ons.

Kevin made his Shakhtar debut against Marseille in the UEFA Europa League on 15 February 2024. He made his first Ukrainian Premier League appearance on 26 February, starting the match as a left winger. He scored his first goals for Shakhtar in his second league appearance, scoring twice against Kolos Kovalivka on 8 March. He finished his first season at the club with three goals and four assists in 17 appearances across all competitions.

On 17 June 2025, Kevin was announced as Shakhtar's player of the season for the 2024–25 season.

=== Fulham ===
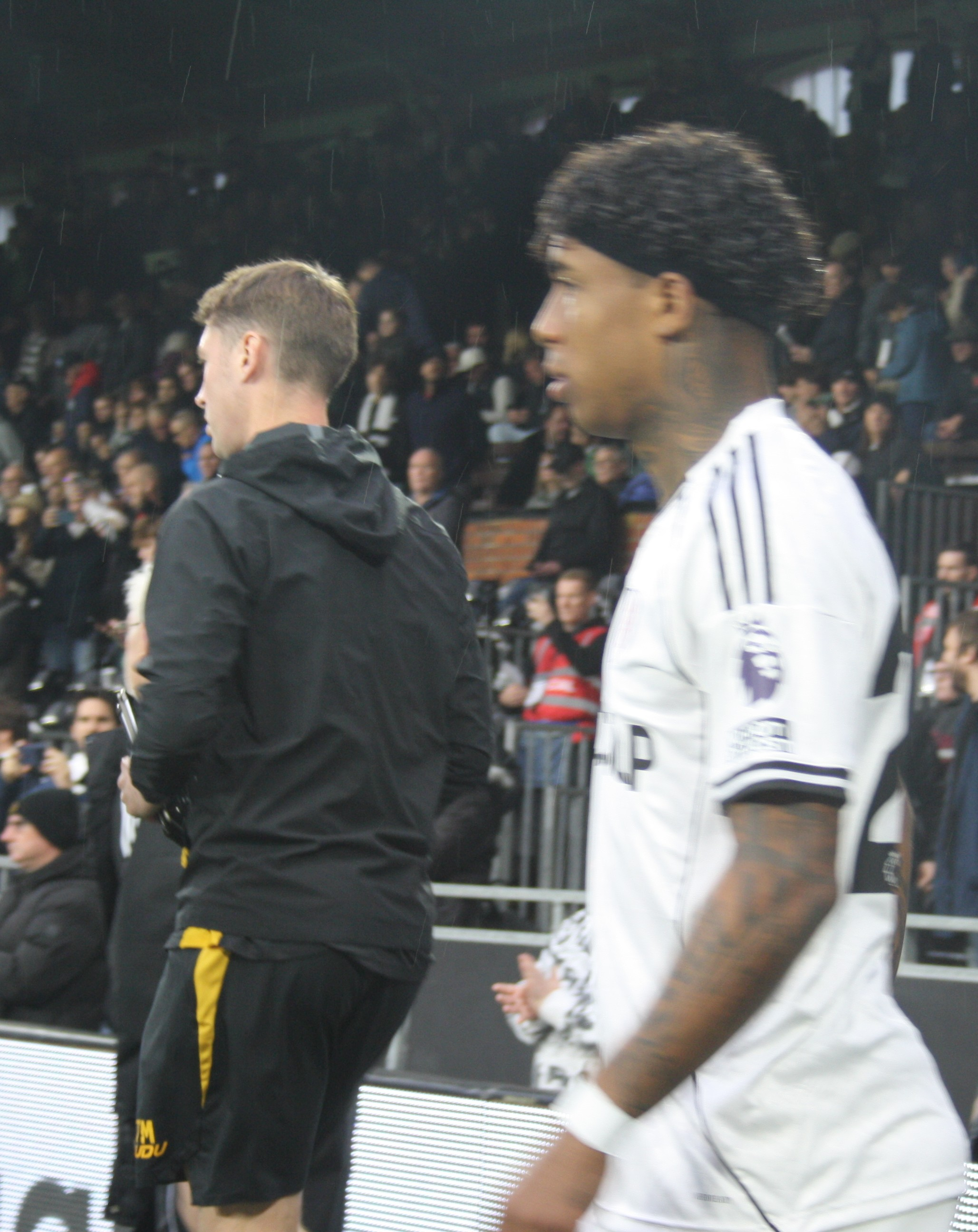
Kevin playing for Fulham in 2025

On 1 September 2025, Kevin joined Premier League side Fulham for a club-record £34.6 million fee, signing a five-year contract with an option for an additional year.

He made his debut for Fulham, coming on as a 76th minute substitute, in a 1–0 win against Leeds United on 13 September 2025. His debut performance was praised by The Independent and Marco Silva, due to "showing his exciting potential, creating chances and almost scoring in added time with a long-range strike".

On 10 January 2026, he scored his first goal for the club in a 3–1 victory over Middlesbrough in the third round of the FA Cup. On 1 February, he scored his first league goal for the club in a 3–2 defeat to Manchester United at Old Trafford.

== Career statistics ==
As of match played 28 October 2026

Appearances and goals by club, season and competition
Club	Season	League			State league (Note: Includes Campeonato Paulista)		National cup (Note: Includes Ukrainian Cup, FA Cup)		League cup (Note: Includes EFL Cup)		Continental		Total	
Club	Season	Division	Apps	Goals	Apps	Goals	Apps	Goals	Apps	Goals	Apps	Goals	Apps	Goals
Desportivo Brasil	2020	Paulista A3	—		4	0	—		—		—		4	0
Palmeiras	2021	Série A	2	1	—		0	0	—		0	0	2	1
Palmeiras	2023	Série A	7	0	0	0	0	0	—		2 (Note: Appearances in Copa Libertadores)	0	9	0
Palmeiras	Total		9	1	0	0	0	0	—		2	0	11	1
Shakhtar Donetsk	2023–24	Ukrainian Premier League	14	3	—		2	0	—		1 (Note: Appearance in UEFA Europa League)	0	17	3
Shakhtar Donetsk	2024–25	Ukrainian Premier League	24	6	—		4	1	—		7 (Note: Appearances in UEFA Champions League)	2	35	9
Shakhtar Donetsk	2025–26	Ukrainian Premier League	0	0	—		—		—		5 (Note: Three appearances and four goals in UEFA Europa League, one appearance and one goal in UEFA Conference League)	5	5	5
Shakhtar Donetsk	Total		38	9	—		6	1	—		13	7	57	17
Fulham	2025–26	Premier League	25	1	—		2	2	3	0	—		30	3
Fulham	2026–27	Premier League	5	0	—		0	0	2	0	—		7	0
Fulham	Total		30	1	—		2	2	5	0	—		37	3
Career total			77	11	4	0	8	3	5	0	15	7	109	20

== Honours ==
Palmeiras

- Campeonato Brasileiro Série A: 2023

Shakhtar Donetsk

- Ukrainian Cup: 2024–25
