= Marlon Gomes =

Brazilian footballer (born 2003)

Personal information
- Full name: Marlon Gomes Claudino
- Date of birth: 14 December 2003 (age 22)
- Place of birth: Rio de Janeiro, Brazil
- Height: 1.81 m (5 ft 11 in)
- Position: Midfielder

Team information
- Current team: Shakhtar Donetsk
- Number: 6

Youth career
- 2009–2013: Escolinha de Novos Talentos
- 2013–2017: Nova Iguaçu
- 2017–2022: Vasco da Gama

Senior career*
Years	Team	Apps	(Gls)
2022–2023	Vasco da Gama	44	(2)
2024–	Shakhtar Donetsk	59	(8)

International career^{‡}
2019	Brazil U16	2	(0)
2021–2023	Brazil U20	16	(1)
2023–	Brazil U23	9	(2)
2026–	Brazil	1	(0)
Medal record
Men's football
Representing Brazil
South American U-20 Championship
Winner	2023 Colombia
- * Club domestic league appearances and goals as of 30 October 2026 ‡ National team caps and goals as of 14 November 2026

Marlon Gomes Claudino (born 14 December 2003) is a Brazilian footballer who plays as a midfielder for Shakhtar Donetsk and the Brazil national team.

== Club career ==
Born in Rio de Janeiro, Marlon Gomes started his career with Escolinha de Futebol Arena das Nações at the age of five, before a move to Nova Iguaçu at the age of nine. He joined Vasco da Gama in 2017.

On 26 January 2024, Ukrainian Premier League club Shakhtar Donetsk announced the signing of Gomes from Vasco da Gama on a contract until the end of 2028.

== International career ==
Marlon Gomes has represented Brazil at under-16 and under-20 level.

On 29 October 2026, Marlon was called up to the Brazil national team by Carlo Ancelotti for two friendlies against Japan and Singapore.

== Personal life ==
Marlon Gomes is the brother of fellow professional footballer Matheus Claudino.

In 2018, shortly after his move to Vasco de Gama, he became father to a daughter, Maitê.

== Career statistics ==
=== Club ===
As of match played 3 November 2026

Club	Season	League			State League		Cup		Continental		Other		Total	
Club	Season	Division	Apps	Goals	Apps	Goals	Apps	Goals	Apps	Goals	Apps	Goals	Apps	Goals
Vasco da Gama	2022	Série B	18	2	0	0	0	0	—		0	0	18	2
Vasco da Gama	2023	Série A	23	0	3	0	1	0	—		0	0	27	0
Vasco da Gama	Total		41	2	3	0	1	0	0	0	0	0	45	2
Shakhtar Donetsk	2023–24	Ukrainian Premier League	11	4	—		2	0	0	0	0	0	13	4
Shakhtar Donetsk	2024–25	Ukrainian Premier League	21	3	—		4	0	7 (Note: Appearances in UEFA Champions League)	1	—		34	4
Shakhtar Donetsk	2025–26	Ukrainian Premier League	19	1	—		1	0	14 (Note: Five appearances in UEFA Europa League, nine appearances and one goal in UEFA Conference League)	1	—		34	2
Shakhtar Donetsk	2026–27	Ukrainian Premier League	6	0	—		2	0	4	0	—		12	0
Shakhtar Donetsk	Total		59	8	—		9	0	25	2	0	0	93	10
Career total			100	10	3	0	10	0	25	2	0	0	138	12

== Honours ==
Shakhtar Donetsk

- Ukrainian Cup: 2024–25
