= Ivan Pakholyuk =

Ukrainian footballer (born 2004)

Personal information
- Full name: Ivan Vladyslavovych Pakholyuk
- Date of birth: 27 April 2004 (age 22)
- Place of birth: Irpin, Kyiv Oblast, Ukraine
- Height: 1.84 m (6 ft 0 in)
- Position: Goalkeeper

Team information
- Current team: Kolos Kovalivka
- Number: 31

Youth career
- 2017: Skala Stryi
- 2018–2019: Arsenal Kyiv
- 2019–2022: Kolos Kovalivka

Senior career*
Years	Team	Apps	(Gls)
2022–	Kolos Kovalivka	53	(0)

International career^{‡}
2025–	Ukraine U21	1	(0)
- * Club domestic league appearances and goals as of 3 June 2026 ‡ National team caps and goals as of 14 November 2025

Ivan Pakholyuk (Ukrainian: Іван Владиславович Пахолюк; born 27 April 2004) is a Ukrainian professional footballer who plays as a goalkeeper for Kolos Kovalivka.

== Club career ==
Pakholyuk is a product of the Skala Stryi, Arsenal Kyiv and Kolos Kovalivka academies.

Pakholyuk made his debut in the Ukrainian Premier League for Kolos Kovalivka on 4 August 2024 as a first choice goalkeeper in an away match against Obolon Kyiv.

== International career ==
In November 2024, Pakholyuk was called up for the first time to the Ukraine under-21 team as a main squad player, ahead of friendly matches vs Portugal under-21 and Italy under-21, on 15 and 19 November 2024, respectively.
