= Roman Volokhatyi =

Ukrainian footballer

Personal information
- Full name: Roman Andriyovych Volokhatyi
- Date of birth: 23 August 2000 (age 26)
- Place of birth: Peredmirka, Ternopil Oblast, Ukraine
- Height: 1.76 m (5 ft 9 in)
- Position: Central midfielder

Team information
- Current team: Obolon Kyiv
- Number: 20

Youth career
- 2016–2017: Chortkiv-Pedlitsey

Senior career*
Years	Team	Apps	(Gls)
2016–2018	Krystal Chortkiv	16	(1)
2017	→ Ternopil-Pedlitsey	16	(7)
2018	Ahronyva Zavodske	8	(2)
2018–2024	Nyva Ternopil	122	(10)
2024–2025	Inhulets Petrove	47	(4)
2026–	Obolon Kyiv	12	(2)
- * Club domestic league appearances and goals as of 24 December 2025

Roman Andriyovych Volokhatyi (Ukrainian: Роман Андрійович Волохатий; born 23 August 2000) is a Ukrainian professional footballer who plays as a central midfielder for Ukrainian club Obolon Kyiv.
