= 2017–18 FC Vorskla Poltava season =

Vorskla Poltava
2017-18 season
- President: Roman Cherniak
- Manager: Vasyl Sachko
- Stadium: Oleksiy Butovskyi Vorskla Stadium
- Ukrainian Premier League: 3rd
- Ukrainian Cup: Quarterfinal
- Top goalscorer: League: Yuriy Kolomoyets (9); All: Yuriy Kolomoyets (10)
Home colours	Away colours

The 2017–18 season was 22nd consecutive season in the top Ukrainian football league for Vorskla Poltava. Vorskla competed in Premier League and Ukrainian Cup.

== Players ==
=== Squad information ===
As of 31 May 2018

Squad no.	Name	Nationality	Position	Date of birth (age)
Goalkeepers
1	Bohdan Shust	(Ukraine)	GK	4 March 1986 (aged 32)
12	Danylo Kanevtsev	(Ukraine)	GK	26 July 1996 (aged 21)
21	Oleksandr Tkachenko	(Ukraine)	GK	19 February 1993 (aged 25)
71	Yan Vichnyi ^{List B}	(Ukraine)	GK	27 February 1997 (aged 21)
Defenders
2	Andro Giorgadze ^{List B}	(Georgia (country))	DF	3 May 1996 (aged 22)
5	Oleh Ostapenko ^{List B}	(Ukraine)	DF	11 June 1997 (aged 20)
17	Volodymyr Chesnakov (Captain)	(Ukraine)	DF	12 February 1988 (aged 30)
23	Vadym Sapay	(Ukraine)	DF	7 February 1986 (aged 32)
33	Oleksandr Chyzhov	(Ukraine)	DF	10 August 1986 (aged 31)
37	Oleksiy Lutsenko ^{List B}	(Ukraine)	DF	3 March 1997 (aged 21)
40	Taras Sakiv ^{List B}	(Ukraine)	DF	19 November 1997 (aged 20)
44	Ardin Dallku	(Kosovo) (Albania)	DF	1 November 1994 (aged 23)
55	Ihor Honchar	(Ukraine)	DF	10 January 1993 (aged 25)
73	Vadym Chervak ^{List B}	(Ukraine)	DF	27 May 1999 (aged 19)
Midfielders
4	Ihor Perduta	(Ukraine)	MF	15 November 1990 (aged 27)
6	Oleksandr Sklyar	(Ukraine)	MF	26 February 1991 (aged 27)
7	Gegham Kadymyan	(Armenia)	MF	19 October 1992 (aged 25)
11	Vyacheslav Sharpar	(Ukraine)	MF	2 June 1987 (aged 30)
19	Volodymyr Odaryuk	(Ukraine)	MF	13 February 1994 (aged 24)
27	Vladyslav Sydorenko ^{List B}	(Ukraine)	MF	24 October 1997 (aged 20)
29	Dmytro Kravchenko	(Ukraine)	MF	25 February 1995 (aged 23)
30	Aleksandre Kobakhidze	(Georgia (country))	MF	11 February 1987 (aged 31)
35	Oleksandr Maksymenko ^{List B}	(Ukraine)	MF	17 February 1997 (aged 21)
38	Serhiy Kosovskyi ^{List B}	(Ukraine)	MF	19 May 1998 (aged 20)
82	Pavlo Rebenok	(Ukraine)	MF	23 July 1985 (aged 32)
95	Yuriy Hluschuk	(Ukraine)	MF	16 January 1995 (aged 23)
Forwards
9	Mykhaylo Serhiychuk	(Ukraine)	FW	29 July 1991 (aged 26)
10	Vladyslav Kulach (on loan from Shakhtar Donetsk)	(Ukraine)	FW	7 May 1993 (aged 25)
25	Dmytro Shapoval ^{List B}	(Ukraine)	FW	17 June 1996 (aged 21)
26	Yuriy Kolomoyets	(Ukraine)	FW	22 March 1990 (aged 28)
77	Denys Vasin	(Ukraine)	FW	4 March 1989 (aged 29)

== Transfers ==
=== In ===
Date	Pos.	Player	Age	Moving from	Type	Fee	Source
Summer
23 June 2017	FW	(Ukraine) Yuriy Kolomoyets	27	(Hungary) MTK Budapest	Transfer	Undisclosed	
25 June 2017	MF	(Armenia) Gegham Kadymyan	24	(Ukraine) Zorya Luhansk	Transfer	Undisclosed	
11 July 2017	DF	(Georgia (country)) Andro Giorgadze	21	(Georgia (country)) Merani Martvili	Transfer	Undisclosed	
1 September 2017	DF	(Georgia (country)) Aleksandre Kobakhidze	30	(Turkey) Göztepe	Transfer	Free	
1 June 2017	GK	(Ukraine) Oleksandr Tkachenko	24	(Ukraine) Hirnyk-Sport	Loan return		
15 June 2017	FW	(Ukraine) Vladyslav Kulach	24	(Ukraine) Shakhtar Donetsk	Loan		
3 July 2017	DF	(Ukraine) Mykola Matviyenko	21	(Ukraine) Shakhtar Donetsk	Loan		
Winter
11 January 2018	FW	(Ukraine) Denys Vasin	28	(Ukraine) Chornomorets Odesa	Transfer	Free	
17 January 2018	GK	(Ukraine) Danylo Kanevtsev	21	(Ukraine) Metalist 1925 Kharkiv	Transfer	Undisclosed	
26 January 2018	DF	(Ukraine) Ihor Honchar	25	Unattached	Transfer	Free	
13 February 2018	MF	(Ukraine) Yuriy Hluschuk	23	(Ukraine) Shakhtar Donetsk	Transfer	Undisclosed	
5 March 2018	FW	(Ukraine) Mykhaylo Serhiychuk	26	(Ukraine) Veres Rivne	Transfer	Free	

=== Out ===
Date	Pos.	Player	Age	Moving to	Type	Fee	Source
Summer
14 July 2017	FW	(Ukraine) Oleh Barannik	25	(Ukraine) FC Poltava	Transfer	Free	
28 July 2017	MF	(Ukraine) Bohdan Melnyk	20	(Hungary) Kisvárda FC	Transfer	Free	
21 September 2017	FW	(Ukraine) Yevhen Zarichnyuk	25	(Ukraine) MFC Mykolaiv	Transfer	Free	
26 July 2017	MF	(Ukraine) Serhiy Ichanskyi	21	(Ukraine) Cherkaskyi Dnipro	Transfer / Loan ?	Undisclosed	
11 August 2017	DF	(Ukraine) Mykola Kvasnyi	22	(Ukraine) PFC Sumy	Transfer / Loan ?	Undisclosed	
1 July 2017	DF	(Ukraine) Serhiy Myakushko	24	(Ukraine) Dynamo Kyiv	Loan return		
1 July 2017	FW	(Ukraine) Dmytro Khlyobas	23	(Ukraine) Dynamo Kyiv	Loan return		
Winter
21 January 2018	MF	(Ukraine) Andriy Tkachuk	30	(Kazakhstan) Akzhayik	Transfer	Free	
20 February 2018	FW	(Ukraine) Mykhaylo Udod	21	(Ukraine) Avanhard Kramatorsk	Transfer	Undisclosed	
10 February 2018	GK	(Ukraine) Bohdan Sarnavskyi	22	(Ukraine) Veres Rivne	Transfer	Free	
1 March 2018	DF	(Ukraine) Roman Kunyev	26	(Ukraine) Hirnyk-Sport Horishni Plavni	Transfer	Free	
1 January 2018	FW	(Ukraine) Artur Zahorulko	24	(Ukraine) Shakhtar Donetsk	Loan return		
1 January 201	DF	(Ukraine) Mykola Matviyenko	21	(Ukraine) Shakhtar Donetsk	Loan		

== Pre-season and friendlies ==
22 June 2017 Friendly	FC Poltava (Ukraine)	0–0	(Ukraine) Vorskla Poltava	Poltava
15:30 EEST (UTC+03:00)		Report		Stadium: Lokomotyv Stadium

28 June 2017 Friendly	Vorskla Poltava (Ukraine)	1–1	(Romania) FC Voluntari	Slovenia
18:00 EEST (UTC+03:00)	Sharpar 20'	Report	Pîrcălabu 74'

1 July 2017 Friendly	Vorskla Poltava (Ukraine)	2–1	(Croatia) NK Rudeš	Slovenia
18:00 EEST (UTC+03:00)	61' (o.g.); Kravchenko 81'	Report	Kamenar 21'

5 July 2017 Friendly	Vorskla Poltava (Ukraine)	1–1	(Croatia) Istra 1961	Rogatec, Slovenia
17:00 EEST (UTC+03:00)	Sharpar 29'	Report	Mitrevski 67'

8 July 2017 Friendly	Vorskla Poltava (Ukraine)	Cancelled	(Slovenia) NK Celje	Slovenia
19:00 EEST (UTC+03:00)		Report

7 July 2017 Friendly	Vorskla Poltava (Ukraine)	0–1	(Croatia) Dinamo Zagreb	Murska Sobota, Slovenia
19:00 EEST (UTC+03:00)		Report	Hodžić 12'	Stadium: Fazanerija City Stadium

8 October 2017 Friendly	Vorskla Poltava (Ukraine)	2–3	(Ukraine) FC Oleksandriya	Poltava
15:00 EEST (UTC+03:00)	Sharpar 59'; Tkachuk 75'	Report	Sitalo 48', 62'; Kozak 50'	Stadium: Ltava Stadium

13 November 2017 Friendly	Vorskla Poltava (Ukraine)	5–2	(Ukraine) PFC Sumy	Poltava
13:00 EET (UTC+02:00)	Kobakhidze 12', 42'; Sharpar 21' (pen.); Giorgadze 29'; Zahorulko 57' (pen.)	Report	Bushman 45'; Shtanko 75' (pen.)	Stadium: Ltava Stadium; Attendance: 100

13 January 2018 Friendly	Vorskla Poltava (Ukraine)	2–1	(Uzbekistan) Nasaf Qarshi	Side, Turkey
15:00 EET (UTC+02:00)	Kadymyan 63', 86'	Report	Mukhiddinov 75'

17 January 2018 Friendly	Vorskla Poltava (Ukraine)	2–1	(Slovakia) Spartak Trnava	Antalya, Turkey
15:00 EET (UTC+02:00)	Kadymyan 32'; Odaryuk 77'	Report	Hladík 43'	Stadium: Topkapi

20 January 2018 Friendly	Vorskla Poltava (Ukraine)	2–1	(Poland) Jagiellonia Białystok	Belek, Turkey
15:00 EET (UTC+02:00)	Sharpar 30'; Odaryuk 62'	Report	Sheridan 40'

24 January 2018 Friendly	Vorskla Poltava (Ukraine)	2–1	(Poland) Arka Gdynia	Manavgat, Turkey
14:00 EET (UTC+02:00)	Rebenok 9'; Vasin 54'	Report	Kun 79'	Stadium: Hane hotel complex

30 January 2018 Friendly	Vorskla Poltava (Ukraine)	3–2	(Serbia) Napredak Kruševac	Çolaklı, Turkey
14:00 EET (UTC+02:00)	Kulach 9'; Giorgadze 54'; Kobakhidze 54'	Report	Zec 79'; Vukanović 54'

2 February 2018 Friendly	Vorskla Poltava (Ukraine)	4–1	(Georgia (country)) Dinamo Tbilisi	Turkey
14:30 EET (UTC+02:00)	Sharpar 31' (pen.); Chesnakov 65'; Kulach 68'; Giorgadze 81'	Report	Zivzivadze 10'

7 February 2018 Friendly	Vorskla Poltava (Ukraine)	1–3	(Hungary) Paks	Turkey
16:30 EET (UTC+02:00)	Kulach 31' (pen.)	Report	Haraszti 21' (pen.); Szakály 56'; Bertus 80'

10 February 2018 Friendly	Vorskla Poltava (Ukraine)	0–1	(Hungary) Kisvárda	Çolaklı, Turkey
10:00 EET (UTC+02:00)		Report	Lucas 13'

10 February 2018 Friendly	Vorskla Poltava (Ukraine)	2–1	(Lithuania) Žalgiris Vilnius	Çolaklı, Turkey
17:00 EET (UTC+02:00)	Kobakhidze 13'; Rebenok 41'	Report	Nyuiadzi 20'

25 March 2018 Friendly	Vorskla Poltava (Ukraine)	4–4	(Ukraine) SC Dnipro-1	Kopyly
11:35 EEST (UTC+03:00)	Kolomoyets 9'; Ostapenko 34'; Serhiychuk 44'; Rebenok 45'	Report	Sula 62', 75'; Memeshev 72'; Lohinov 89'	Stadium: Vorskla train base Attendance: 150

== Competitions ==
=== Overall ===
Competition	First match	Last match	Starting round	Final position	Record							
Competition	First match	Last match	Starting round	Final position	Pld	W	D	L	GF	GA	GD	Win %
Premier League	18 July 2017	20 May 2018	Matchday 1	3rd	32	14	7	11	37	35	+2	43.75
Cup	20 September 2017	29 November 2017	Round 3 (1/16)	Quarterfinal	3	2	0	1	5	2	+3	66.67
Total					35	16	7	12	42	37	+5	45.71

Last updated: 20 May 2018
Source: Competitions

=== Premier League ===
==== League table ====
Pos	Team	Pld	W	D	L	GF	GA	GD	Pts	Qualification or relegation
1	Shakhtar Donetsk (C)	32	24	3	5	71	24	+47	75	Qualification for the Champions League group stage
2	Dynamo Kyiv	32	22	7	3	64	25	+39	73	Qualification for the Champions League third qualifying round
3	Vorskla Poltava	32	14	7	11	37	35	+2	49	Qualification for the Europa League group stage (Note: Since the winners of the 2017–18 Ukrainian Cup, Shakhtar Donetsk, qualified for European competition based on league position, the spot awarded to the cup winners (Europa League group stage) was passed to the third-placed team, the spot awarded to the third-placed team (Europa League third qualifying round) was passed to the fourth-placed team, and the spot awarded to the fourth-placed team (Europa League second qualifying round) was passed to the fifth-placed team.)
4	Zorya Luhansk	32	11	10	11	44	44	0	43	Qualification for the Europa League third qualifying round
5	FC Mariupol	32	10	9	13	38	41	−3	39	Qualification for the Europa League second qualifying round

Source: Ukrainian Premier League (in Ukrainian), UEFA, Soccerway
Rules for classification: 1) Points; 2) Goal difference; 3) Goals scored; 4) Head-to-head points; 5) Head-to-head goal difference; 6) Head-to-head goals scored; 7) Draw.
(C) Champions
Notes:

Team 1	Agg.	Team 2	1st leg	2nd leg
Zirka Kropyvnytskyi	1–5	Desna Chernihiv	1–1	0–4
Chornomorets Odesa	1–3	FC Poltava	1–0	0–3 (a.e.t.)

==== Results summary ====
Overall								Home						Away					
Pld	W	D	L	GF	GA	GD	Pts	W	D	L	GF	GA	GD	W	D	L	GF	GA	GD
32	14	7	11	37	35	+2	49	7	5	4	15	14	+1	7	2	7	22	21	+1

Last updated: 20 May 2018.
Source: Competitive matches

==== Results by round ====
Round	1	2	3	4	5	6	7	8	9	10	11	12	13	14	15	16	17	18	19	20	21	22	23	24	25	26	27	28	29	30	31	32
Ground	H	A	H	H	A	H	A	H	A	H	A	A	H	A	A	H	A	H	A	H	A	H	H	A	H	H	A	A	H	A	A	H
Result	L	W	W	D	W	W	W	D	L	D	W	L	L	L	L	D	W	W	W	W	L	W	L	L	D	W	W	L	L	D	D	W
Position	12	5	4	4	4	3	3	3	4	4	3	3	4	4	5	5	5	3	3	3	3	3	3	4	3	3	3	3	3	3	3	3

Updated to match(es) played on 20 May 2018. Source: Competitive matches
A = Away; H = Home; W = Win; D = Draw; L = Loss

==== Matches ====
18 July 2017 1	Vorskla Poltava	0–3	Shakhtar Donetsk	Poltava
18:00 EEST (UTC+03:00)	Sklyar (yellow card) 20'; Sapay (yellow card) 64'; Chyzhov (yellow card) 87'	Report	Ferreyra 27'; Marlos 66'; Kryvtsov (yellow card) 75'; Alan Patrick 90+3'	Stadium: Vorskla Stadium; Attendance: 11,000; Referee: Yaroslav Kozyk

23 July 2017 2	Karpaty Lviv	1–3	Vorskla Poltava	Lviv
17:00 EEST (UTC+03:00)	Ribas 17'; Pereyra (yellow card) 65'; Arqués (yellow card) 90+3'	Report	Kolomoyets 5'; Chesnakov (yellow card) 15'; Sharpar 49', (yellow card) 62'; Sklyar (yellow card) 80'; Odaryuk (yellow card) 86', (goal) 90+1'	Stadium: Ukraina Stadium; Attendance: 6,893; Referee: Ihor Paskhal

29 July 2017 3	Vorskla Poltava	2–1	Zirka Kropyvnytskyi	Poltava
19:30 EEST (UTC+03:00)	Hovhannisyan 19' (o.g.); Perduta (yellow card) 81'; Zahorulko 85'	Report	Drachenko 25', (yellow card) 65'; Eseola (yellow card) 77'; Panfilov (yellow card) 90+3'	Stadium: Vorskla Stadium; Attendance: 1,500; Referee: Dmytro Bondarenko

6 August 2017 4	Vorskla Poltava	0–0	Dynamo Kyiv	Poltava
19:30 EEST (UTC+03:00)	Sharpar (yellow card) 51'; Sklyar (yellow card) 73'; Perduta (yellow card) 89'	Report	Sydorchuk (yellow card) 63'; Khacheridi (yellow card) 71'; Buyalskyi (yellow card) 89'; Kędziora (yellow card) 90'	Stadium: Vorskla Stadium; Attendance: 9,500; Referee: Anatoliy Abdula

12 August 2017 5	Stal Kamianske	0–1	Vorskla Poltava	Kyiv
17:00 EEST (UTC+03:00)	Yakymiv (yellow card) 90'	Report	Sharpar (yellow card) 35'; Kravchenko (yellow card) 62'; Dallku 90+1'	Stadium: Obolon Arena; Attendance: 1,250; Referee: Oleksandr Derdo

20 August 2017 6	Vorskla Poltava	1–0	FC Mariupol	Poltava
19:30 EEST (UTC+03:00)	Sklyar (yellow card) 66'; Chyzhov (yellow card) 72', (goal) 82'	Report	Nasonov (yellow card) 56'; Koltsov (yellow card) 71'; Rudyka (yellow card) 79'	Stadium: Vorskla Stadium; Attendance: 4,500; Referee: Serhiy Berezka

27 August 2017 7	FC Oleksandriya	0–1	Vorskla Poltava	Oleksandriya
19:30 EEST (UTC+03:00)	Kalenchuk (yellow card) 76'	Report	Rebenok 28'; Dallku (yellow card) 72'; Sharpar (yellow card) 74'; Tkachenko (yellow card) 90+3'	Stadium: CSC Nika Stadium; Attendance: 1,200; Referee: Mykola Kryvonosov

9 September 2017 8	Vorskla Poltava	1–1	Olimpik Donetsk	Poltava
19:30 EEST (UTC+03:00)	Kravchenko 1'; Sklyar (yellow card) 26'; Kolomoyets (yellow card) 74'; Chesnakov (yellow card) 90+1'	Report	Moha 26' (pen.); Postupalenko (yellow card) 29'; Makharadze (yellow card) 29'; Ochigava (yellow card) 35'; Shabanov (yellow card) 75'; Brikner (yellow card) 90+3'	Stadium: Vorskla Stadium; Attendance: 4,000; Referee: Ihor Paskhal

16 September 2017 9	Veres Rivne	1–0	Vorskla Poltava	Lviv
17:00 EEST (UTC+03:00)	Yevhen Pasich 65'; Voloshynovych (yellow card) 67'; Bandura (yellow card) 90+4'	Report	Chyzhov (yellow card) 26'; Kolomoyets (yellow card) 50'; Perduta (yellow card) 77'	Stadium: Arena Lviv; Attendance: 1,138; Referee: Denys Shurman

24 September 2017 10	Vorskla Poltava	1–1	Zorya Luhansk	Poltava
19:30 EEST (UTC+03:00)	Chyzhov (yellow card) 45+2'; Dallku (yellow card) 60'; Kulach (yellow card) 89'; Kolomoyets 90'	Report	Opanasenko 44'; Babenko (yellow card) 69'	Stadium: Vorskla Stadium; Attendance: 3,123; Referee: Mykola Balakin

1 October 2017 11	Chornomorets Odesa	0–3	Vorskla Poltava	Odesa
14:00 EEST (UTC+03:00)		Report	Kulach 36'; Perduta (yellow card) 55'; Kadymyan 77'; Sklyar (yellow card) 77'; Kolomoyets 80'; Tkachenko (yellow card) 83'	Stadium: Chornomorets Stadium; Attendance: 4,562; Referee: Kostyantyn Trukhanov

13 October 2017 12	Shakhtar Donetsk	3–2	Vorskla Poltava	Kharkiv
19:00 EEST (UTC+03:00)	Marlos 21'; Ferreyra 36', 82'; Rakitskiy (yellow card) 64'; Alan Patrick (yellow card) 66'	Report	Kolomoyets 42', 57'; Sapay (yellow card) 54'; Sklyar (yellow card) 62'	Stadium: OSC Metalist; Attendance: 6,020; Referee: Yuriy Mozharovsky

21 October 2017 13	Vorskla Poltava	0–1	Karpaty Lviv	Poltava
19:30 EEST (UTC+03:00)	Sharpar (yellow card) 78'; Sklyar (yellow card) 82'	Report	Myakushko 83'	Stadium: Vorskla Stadium; Attendance: 2,010; Referee: Mykola Kryvonosov

29 October 2017 14	Zirka Kropyvnytskyi	1–0	Vorskla Poltava	Kropyvnytskyi
14:00 EET (UTC+02:00)	Pryadun (yellow card) 9'; Chychykov 19'; Cécé Pepe (yellow card) 23'; Hovhannisyan (yellow card) 88'	Report	Chyzhov (yellow card) 11'	Stadium: Zirka Stadium; Attendance: 1,467; Referee: Ivan Bondar

5 November 2017 15	Dynamo Kyiv	2–1	Vorskla Poltava	Kyiv
19:30 EET (UTC+02:00)	Moraes 26'; Buyalskyi 30'; Korzun (yellow card) 90+4'	Report	Chesnakov (yellow card) 22', (goal) 58'; Odaryuk (yellow card) 90'; Perduta (yellow card) 90+1'	Stadium: NSC Olimpiyskiy; Attendance: 7,129; Referee: Yaroslav Kozyk

19 November 2017 16	Vorskla Poltava	1–1	Stal Kamianske	Poltava
14:00 EET (UTC+03:00)	Chyzhov (yellow card) 27'; Kobakhidze 56'; Sklyar (yellow card) 80'	Report	Danielyan (yellow card) 45'; Khotsyanovskyi 72'; Kopytov (yellow card) 90+3'	Stadium: Vorskla Stadium; Attendance: 650; Referee: Serhiy Berezka

25 November 2017 17	FC Mariupol	0–1	Vorskla Poltava	Mariupol
14:00 EET (UTC+02:00)	Fomin (yellow card) 20'; Tankovskyi (yellow card) 41'; Totovytskyi (yellow card) 66'	Report	Sklyar (yellow card) 17' (yellow-red card) 55'; Perduta (yellow card) 34'; Sharpar 79', (yellow card) 79'	Stadium: Volodymyr Boiko Stadium; Attendance: 4,129; Referee: Dmytro Kutakov

3 December 2017 18	Vorskla Poltava	3–1	FC Oleksandriya	Poltava
17:00 EET (UTC+02:00)	Kulach 20'; Kolomoyets 42'; Kobakhidze 49'; Chesnakov (yellow card) 74'; Giorgadze (yellow card) 78'	Report	Zaporozhan (yellow card) 52'; Polyarus (yellow card) 88'; Hitchenko 90+2'	Stadium: Vorskla Stadium; Attendance: 400; Referee: Ivan Bondar

9 December 2017 19	Olimpik Donetsk	1–4	Vorskla Poltava	Kyiv
17:00 EET (UTC+02:00)	Fedoriv (yellow card) 14'; Pryyomov 20', (yellow card) 33'	Report	Kobakhidze 10'; Chyzhov 22', (yellow card) 26'; Kulach 27' (pen.); Perduta (yellow card) 48'; Sharpar 88'	Stadium: Dynamo Stadium; Attendance: 553; Referee: Mykola Balakin

17 February 2018 20	Vorskla Poltava	1–0	Veres Rivne	Poltava
17:00 EET (UTC+02:00)	Chesnakov (yellow card) 47'; Kulach 58', (yellow card) 59'; Sapay (yellow card) 80'	Report	Kalenchuk (yellow card) 30'; Kamenyuka (yellow card) 73'; Borzenko (yellow card) 76'; Serhiychuk (yellow card) 87'	Stadium: Vorskla Stadium; Attendance: 700; Referee: Mykola Balakin

24 February 2018 21	Zorya Luhansk	3–0	Vorskla Poltava	Zaporizhia
14:00 EET (UTC+02:00)	Checher (yellow card) 53'; Hordiyenko 71'; Iury 76'; Hromov 88'	Report	Kolomoyets (yellow card) 39'; Sapay (yellow card) 39'; Kulach (yellow card) 45+2'; Vasin (yellow card) 64' (yellow-red card) 68'	Stadium: Slavutych-Arena; Attendance: 1,625; Referee: Dmytro Kutakov

3 March 2018 22	Vorskla Poltava	2–1	Chornomorets Odesa	Poltava
17:00 EET (UTC+02:00)	Kolomoyets 17'; Zubeyko 45' (o.g.); Dallku (yellow card) 45+2'	Report	Bamba (yellow card) 60', (goal) 78'	Stadium: Vorskla Stadium; Attendance: 400; Referee: Viktor Kopiyevskyi

9 March 2018 23	Vorskla Poltava	0–3	Shakhtar Donetsk	Poltava
19:00 EET (UTC+02:00)	Sklyar (yellow card) 25'	Report	Ferreyra 22', 36'; Stepanenko (yellow card) 27'; Khocholava (yellow card) 65'; Marlos 67' (pen.)	Stadium: Vorskla Stadium; Attendance: 1,500; Referee: Oleksandr Derdo

18 March 2018 24	Dynamo Kyiv	4–0	Vorskla Poltava	Kyiv
19:30 EET (UTC+02:00)	Besyedin 4'; Burda 54'; Tsyhankov 63' (pen.); Rotan (yellow card) 83'; Khlyobas 88'	Report		Stadium: NSC Olimpiyskiy; Attendance: 3,745; Referee: Viktor Kopiyevskyi

31 March 2018 25	Vorskla Poltava	0–0	Veres Rivne	Poltava
17:00 EEST (UTC+03:00)	Kulach (yellow card) 36'; Rebenok (yellow card) 52'; Serhiychuk (yellow card) 67'; Sapay (yellow card) 86'	Report	Kalenchuk (yellow card) 28'	Stadium: Vorskla Stadium; Attendance: 811; Referee: Anatoliy Abdula

7 April 2018 26	Vorskla Poltava	1–0	FC Mariupol	Poltava
19:30 EEST (UTC+03:00)	Chesnakov (yellow card) 19'; Sharpar (yellow card) 28'; Serhiychuk 57', (yellow card) 59'; Shust (yellow card) 65'	Report	Ihnatenko (yellow card) 90+1'; Didenko (yellow card) 90+2'	Stadium: Vorskla Stadium; Attendance: 10,030; Referee: Mykola Balakin

15 April 2018 27	Zorya Luhansk	0–3	Vorskla Poltava	Zaporizhia
19:30 EEST (UTC+03:00)	Cheberko (yellow card) 84'	Report	Chesnakov 50', (yellow card) 83'; Sharpar (yellow card) 55'; Vasin (yellow card) 65'; Kulach 73'; Odaryuk (yellow card) 81'; Serhiychuk 90+1'	Stadium: Slavutych-Arena; Attendance: 2,125; Referee: Viktor Kopiyevskyi

21 April 2018 28	Shakhtar Donetsk	4–2	Vorskla Poltava	Kharkiv
17:00 EEST (UTC+03:00)	Marlos 23', 47', (yellow card) 83'; Stepanenko (yellow card) 27'; Rakitskiy (yellow card) 37'; Kovalenko 50'; Alan Patrick (yellow card) 83', (goal) 88'; Pyatov (yellow card) 87'; Dentinho (yellow card) 90+3'	Report	Giorgadze (yellow card) 7'; Kolomoyets 53'; Serhiychuk 62'	Stadium: OSC Metalist; Attendance: 4,698; Referee: Anatoliy Abdula

29 April 2018 29	Vorskla Poltava	0–1	Dynamo Kyiv	Poltava
19:30 EEST (UTC+03:00)	Chesnakov (yellow card) 32'; Dallku (yellow card) 60'; Chyzhov (yellow card) 77'	Report	Pivarić (yellow card) 4'; Mbokani 63'	Stadium: Vorskla Stadium; Attendance: 14,000; Referee: Oleksandr Derdo

5 May 2018 30	Veres Rivne	0–0	Vorskla Poltava	Lviv
14:00 EET (UTC+02:00)	Kalenchuk (yellow card) 10'; Lukyanchuk (yellow card) 16'; Pryimak (yellow card) 65'; Morozenko (yellow card) 88'	Report	Giorgadze (yellow card) 13'; Perduta (yellow card) 27'; Sharpar (yellow card) 49'; Kulach (yellow card) 63'	Stadium: Arena Lviv; Attendance: 1,112; Referee: Dmytro Kutakov

13 May 2018 31	FC Mariupol	1–1	Vorskla Poltava	Mariupol
19:30 EEST (UTC+03:00)	Boryachuk (yellow card) 20'; Tyschenko 52'	Report	Kolomoyets 30', (yellow card) 60'; Chyzhov (yellow card) 39'; Serhiychuk (yellow card) 80'; Kravchenko (yellow card) 83'	Stadium: Volodymyr Boiko Stadium; Attendance: 2,672; Referee: Dmytro Bondarenko

20 May 2018 32	Vorskla Poltava	2–0	Zorya Luhansk	Poltava
17:00 EEST (UTC+03:00)	Kulach 66', (yellow card) 67'; Rebenok (yellow card) 87'; Vasin 90+2'	Report	Iury (yellow card) 41'; Opanasenko (yellow card) 89'	Stadium: Vorskla Stadium; Attendance: 11,633; Referee: Kostyantyn Trukhanov

=== Ukrainian Cup ===
20 September 2017 Round 3 (1/16)	Avanhard Kramatorsk	0–2	Vorskla Poltava	Kramatorsk
17:30 EEST (UTC+3)	Lobov (yellow card) 26'; Ulyanov (yellow card) 40'	[ Report]	Zahorulko (yellow card) 18'; Sapay (yellow card) 62'; Kadymyan 74'; Kolomoyets (yellow card) 76', (goal) 89'; Kulach (yellow card) 86'	Stadium: Avanhard Stadium; Attendance: 4,000

25 October 2017 Round of 16 (1/8)	Vorskla Poltava	2–0	Olimpik Donetsk	Poltava
17:00 EEST (UTC+03:00)	Sklyar (yellow card) 101'; Sharpar 104'; Kulach 109'	Report	Shabanov (yellow card) 75'; Illoy-Ayyet (yellow card) 88'	Stadium: Vorskla Stadium; Attendance: 2,000; Referee: Oleksandr Derdo

29 November 2017 Quarterfinal	Vorskla Poltava	1–2	FC Mariupol	Poltava
17:00 EET (UTC+02:00)	Kulach 13'	Report	Boryachuk 24'; Totovytskyi (yellow card) 49', (goal) 77'; Churko (yellow card) 54'	Stadium: Vorskla Stadium; Referee: Anatoliy Abdula

== Statistics ==
=== Appearances and goals ===
No.	Pos	Nat	Player	Total		Premier League		Cup	
No.	Pos	Nat	Player	Apps	Goals	Apps	Goals	Apps	Goals
Goalkeepers
1	GK	(Ukraine) UKR	Bohdan Shust	23	0	20	0	3	0
21	GK	(Ukraine) UKR	Oleksandr Tkachenko	13	0	12+1	0	0	0
Defenders
2	DF	(Georgia (country)) GEO	Andro Giorgadze	10	0	6+4	0	0	0
17	DF	(Ukraine) UKR	Volodymyr Chesnakov	31	2	29	2	2	0
23	DF	(Ukraine) UKR	Vadym Sapay	14	0	10+3	0	1	0
33	DF	(Ukraine) UKR	Oleksandr Chyzhov	21	2	20	2	1	0
37	DF	(Ukraine) UKR	Oleksiy Lutsenko	1	0	0+1	0	0	0
40	DF	(Ukraine) UKR	Taras Sakiv	2	0	0+2	0	0	0
44	DF	(Kosovo) KOS	Ardin Dallku	33	1	29+1	1	3	0
73	DF	(Ukraine) UKR	Vadym Chervak	1	0	0+1	0	0	0
Midfielders
4	MF	(Ukraine) UKR	Ihor Perduta	32	0	30	0	2	0
6	MF	(Ukraine) UKR	Oleksandr Sklyar	27	0	20+4	0	3	0
7	MF	(Armenia) ARM	Gegham Kadymyan	27	2	19+5	1	0+3	1
11	MF	(Ukraine) UKR	Vyacheslav Sharpar	32	4	28+1	3	3	1
19	MF	(Ukraine) UKR	Volodymyr Odaryuk	29	1	1+25	1	3	0
29	MF	(Ukraine) UKR	Dmytro Kravchenko	18	1	10+5	1	3	0
30	MF	(Georgia (country)) GEO	Aleksandre Kobakhidze	21	3	16+4	3	1	0
82	MF	(Ukraine) UKR	Pavlo Rebenok	35	1	31+1	1	2+1	0
95	FW	(Ukraine) UKR	Yuriy Hluschuk	1	0	0+1	0	0	0
Forwards
9	FW	(Ukraine) UKR	Mykhaylo Serhiychuk	10	3	3+7	3	0	0
10	FW	(Ukraine) UKR	Vladyslav Kulach	25	8	16+6	6	1+2	2
25	FW	(Ukraine) UKR	Dmytro Shapoval	1	0	0+1	0	0	0
26	FW	(Ukraine) UKR	Yuriy Kolomoyets	33	10	29+1	9	1+2	1
77	FW	(Ukraine) UKR	Denys Vasin	9	1	6+3	1	0	0
Players transferred out during the season
8	MF	(Ukraine) UKR	Andriy Tkachuk	5	0	1+3	0	0+1	0
9	FW	(Ukraine) UKR	Artur Zahorulko	13	1	0+12	1	1	0
22	DF	(Ukraine) UKR	Mykola Matviyenko	19	0	16	0	3	0

Source: Competitions

Last updated: 20 May 2019

=== Goalscorers ===
Rank	No.	Pos	Nat	Name	Premier League	Cup	Total
1	26	FW	(Ukraine)	Yuriy Kolomoyets	9	1	10
2	10	FW	(Ukraine)	Vladyslav Kulach	6	2	8
3	11	MF	(Ukraine)	Vyacheslav Sharpar	3	1	4
4	9	FW	(Ukraine)	Mykhaylo Serhiychuk	3	0	3
4	30	MF	(Georgia (country))	Aleksandre Kobakhidze	3	0	3
6	7	MF	(Armenia)	Gegham Kadymyan	1	1	2
6	17	DF	(Ukraine)	Volodymyr Chesnakov	2	0	2
6	33	DF	(Ukraine)	Oleksandr Chyzhov	2	0	2
9	9	FW	(Ukraine)	Artur Zahorulko	1	0	1
9	19	MF	(Ukraine)	Volodymyr Odaryuk	1	0	1
9	29	MF	(Ukraine)	Dmytro Kravchenko	1	0	1
9	44	DF	(Kosovo)	Ardin Dallku	1	0	1
9	77	FW	(Ukraine)	Denys Vasin	1	0	1
9	82	MF	(Ukraine)	Pavlo Rebenok	1	0	1
				Own goal	2	0	2
				Total	37	5	42

Last updated: 20 May 2018

=== Clean sheets ===
Rank	No.	Pos	Nat	Name	Premier League	Cup	Total
1	1	GK	(Ukraine)	Bohdan Shust	8	2	10
2	21	GK	(Ukraine)	Oleksandr Tkachenko	5	0	5
				Total	13	2	15

Last updated: 20 May 2018

=== Disciplinary record ===
No.	Pos	Nat	Player	Premier League			Cup			Total		
No.	Pos	Nat	Player	Booked	(yellow card) (yellow-red card)	Sent off (straight red)	Booked	(yellow card) (yellow-red card)	Sent off (straight red)	Booked	(yellow card) (yellow-red card)	Sent off (straight red)
1	GK	(Ukraine)	Bohdan Shust	1	0	0	0	0	0	1	0	0
2	DF	(Georgia (country))	Andro Giorgadze	3	0	0	0	0	0	3	0	0
4	MF	(Ukraine)	Ihor Perduta	8	0	0	0	0	0	8	0	0
6	MF	(Ukraine)	Oleksandr Sklyar	10	1	0	1	0	0	11	1	0
9	FW	(Ukraine)	Mykhaylo Serhiychuk	3	0	0	0	0	0	3	0	0
9	FW	(Ukraine)	Artur Zahorulko	0	0	0	1	0	0	1	0	0
10	FW	(Ukraine)	Vladyslav Kulach	6	0	0	1	0	0	7	0	0
11	MF	(Ukraine)	Vyacheslav Sharpar	9	0	0	0	0	0	9	0	0
17	DF	(Ukraine)	Volodymyr Chesnakov	8	0	0	0	0	0	8	0	0
19	MF	(Ukraine)	Volodymyr Odaryuk	3	0	0	0	0	0	3	0	0
21	GK	(Ukraine)	Oleksandr Tkachenko	2	0	0	0	0	0	2	0	0
23	DF	(Ukraine)	Vadym Sapay	5	0	0	1	0	0	6	0	0
26	FW	(Ukraine)	Yuriy Kolomoyets	4	0	0	1	0	0	5	0	0
29	MF	(Ukraine)	Dmytro Kravchenko	2	0	0	0	0	0	2	0	0
33	DF	(Ukraine)	Oleksandr Chyzhov	9	0	0	0	0	0	9	0	0
44	DF	(Kosovo)	Ardin Dallku	4	0	0	0	0	0	4	0	0
77	FW	(Ukraine)	Denys Vasin	0	1	0	0	0	0	0	1	0
82	MF	(Ukraine)	Pavlo Rebenok	2	0	0	0	0	0	2	0	0
			Total	80	2	0	5	0	0	85	2	0

Last updated: 20 May 2018
