= 2015–16 FC Vorskla Poltava season =

Vorskla Poltava
2015–16 season
- Chairman: Post vacant
- Manager: Vasyl Sachko
- Stadium: Oleksiy Butovskyi Vorskla Stadium
- Premier League: 9th
- Ukrainian Cup: Round of 32
- UEFA Europa League: Third qualifying round
- Top goalscorer: League: Kovpak (2); All: Kovpak, Shynder (2)
- Highest home attendance: 12,500 vs Žilina; 6 August 2015
- Lowest home attendance: 5,519 vs Volyn Lutsk; 18 July 2015
Home colours	Away colours

The 2014–15 Vorskla Poltava season was Vorskla's twentieth Ukrainian Premier League season, and their second season under manager Vasyl Sachko. During the season Vorskla Poltava competed in the Ukrainian Premier League, Ukrainian Cup and in the UEFA Europa League.

== Competitions ==
=== Premier League ===
==== League table ====
Pos	Team	Pld	W	D	L	GF	GA	GD	Pts	Qualification or relegation
3	Dnipro Dnipropetrovsk (Note: On 31 March 2016, the Adjudicatory Chamber of the UEFA Club Financial Control Body (CFCB) announced that Dnipro Dnipropetrovsk will be excluded from participating in the next UEFA club competition for which they would otherwise qualify in the next three (3) seasons (i.e. the 2016–17, 2017–18 and 2018–19 seasons).)	26	16	5	5	50	22	+28	53	
4	Zorya Luhansk	26	14	6	6	51	26	+25	48	Qualification to Europa League group stage
5	Vorskla Poltava	26	11	9	6	32	26	+6	42	Qualification to Europa League third qualifying round
6	FC Oleksandriya	26	10	8	8	30	29	+1	38	Qualification to Europa League third qualifying round
7	Karpaty Lviv	26	8	6	12	26	37	−11	30	

Source: uafootball.net.ua
Rules for classification: 1) Points; 2) Goal difference; 3) Goals scored; 4) Head-to-head points; 5) Head-to-head goal difference; 6) Head-to-head goals scored; 7) Fairplay ranking; 8) Draw.

==== Results summary ====
Overall								Home						Away					
Pld	W	D	L	GF	GA	GD	Pts	W	D	L	GF	GA	GD	W	D	L	GF	GA	GD
20	8	8	4	27	22	+5	32	4	4	2	12	12	0	4	4	2	15	10	+5

==== Results by round ====
Round	1	2	3	4	5	6	7	8	9	10	11	12	13	14	15	16	17	18	19	20	21	22	23	24	25	26
Ground	H	A	H	H	A	H	A	H	A	H	A	A	A	H	A	H	H	H	A	H	A					
Result	D	D	D	D	D	W	W	W	D	L	W	D	L	W	W	L	L	W	W	D						
Position	10	8	10	9	9	7	6	6	6	6	6	6	6	5	5	5	5	5	5	5						

Updated to match(es) played on 2 April 2016. Source: Socceraway
A = Away; H = Home; W = Win; D = Draw; L = Loss

==== Matches ====
18 July 2015 1	Vorskla Poltava	1 – 1	Volyn Lutsk	Poltava
19:30 EEST (UTC+3)	A. Tkachuk (yellow card) 28'; Sklyar (yellow card) 51'; Dallku (yellow card) 56'; Y. Tkachuk (yellow card) 69'; Shynder 81'	Summary	Nasonov (yellow card) 19'; Didenko (yellow card) 48'; Shabanov (yellow card) 55'; Kobakhidze 58'; Kravchenko (yellow card) 68'; Žunić (yellow card) 71'	Stadium: Butovskyi Vorskla Stadium; Attendance: 5,519; Referee: Serhiy Berezka

25 July 2015 2	Hoverla Uzhhorod	1 – 1	Vorskla Poltava	Uzhhorod
17:00 EEST (UTC+3)	Tsurikov (yellow card) 49'; Khlyobas (yellow card) 61' (goal) 73'; Kuzyk (yellow card) 88'	Summary	Y. Tkachuk (yellow card) 14'; Kovpak 21'; Siminin (yellow card) 28'; Dallku (yellow card) 90+4'	Stadium: Avanhard Stadium; Attendance: 1,500; Referee: Dmytro Kutakov

2 August 2015 3	Vorskla Poltava	1 – 1	Dnipro Dnipropetrovsk	Poltava
19:30 EEST (UTC+3)	Barannik (yellow card) 37'; Siminin (yellow card) 41'; Fedetskyi 53' (o.g.); Y. Tkachuk (yellow card) 48'; Dallku (yellow card) 70'	Summary	Matos (yellow card) 12'; Fedetskyi (yellow card) 20'; Kalinić 73'	Stadium: Butovskyi Vorskla Stadium; Attendance: 6,500; Referee: Kostyantyn Trukhanov

9 August 2015 4	Vorskla Poltava	2 – 2	Shakhtar Donetsk	Poltava
19:30 EEST (UTC+3)	Dallku (yellow card) 27'; Barannik 45+1'; Perduta (yellow card) 88'; Kovpak 90+2'	Summary	Kucher (yellow card) 31'; Marlos 40'; Eduardo 65'	Stadium: Butovskyi Vorskla Stadium; Attendance: 8,000; Referee: Anatoliy Abdula

15 August 2015 5	Metalurh Zaporizhya	1 - 1	Vorskla Poltava	Zaporizhzhia
17:00 EEST (UTC+3)	Tatarkov (yellow card) 30'; Kornyev 34'	Summary	Shynder (yellow card) 17'; Chesnakov (yellow card) 33'; Dytyatev 61' (yellow card) 86'	Stadium: Slavutych-Arena; Attendance: 1,800; Referee: (Ukraine) Oleksandr Golovkov

29 August 2015 6	Vorskla Poltava	1 - 0	Metalist Kharkiv	Poltava
19:30 EEST (UTC+3)	Dytyatev (yellow card) 49' (goal) 36'; Sklyar (yellow card) 70'; Tursunov (yellow card) 83'	Summary		Stadium: Butovskyi Vorskla Stadium; Referee: (Ukraine) Yaroslav Kozyk

13 September 2015 7	Stal Dniprodzerzhynsk	1 - 2	Vorskla Poltava	Dnipropetrovsk
14:00	Babenko 85'; Budnik (yellow card) 90'	Summary	Siminin (yellow card) 26'; Tkachuk (yellow card) 37'; Chesnakov 60'; Perduta (yellow card) 65'; Bartulović 71'; Dallku (yellow card) 90'; Tkachenko (yellow card) 90'	Stadium: Meteor Stadium; Attendance: 1,500; Referee: (Ukraine) Yuriy Mozharovsky

19 September 2015 8	Vorskla Poltava	2 - 1	Olimpik Donetsk	Poltava
19:30	Hromov 47'; Tursunov 59' (pen.); Shynder (yellow card) 61'	Summary	Condé (yellow card) 17'; Moha 49'; Borzenko (yellow card) 58'; Partsvania (yellow card) 58'	Stadium: Butovskyi Vorskla Stadium; Attendance: 6,130; Referee: (Ukraine) Dmitry Kutakov

27 September 2015 9	Chornomorets Odesa	0 - 0	Vorskla Poltava	Odesa
17:00	Korkishko (yellow card) 73'	Summary	Siminin (yellow card) 43'; Dallku (yellow card) 58'; Shynder (yellow card) 58'; Bartulović (red card) 63'	Stadium: Chornomorets Stadium; Attendance: 4,915; Referee: (Ukraine) Yevhen Aranovsky

4 October 2015 10	Vorskla Poltava	0 - 4	Dynamo Kyiv	Poltava
19:30	Tkachuk (yellow card) 31'; Shynder (yellow card) 57'	Summary	Buyalskyi 18'; Vitorino Antunes 33'; González 67'; Yarmolenko 71'	Stadium: Butovskyi Vorskla Stadium; Attendance: 16,000; Referee: (Ukraine) Yuriy Vaks

18 October 2015 11	Karpaty Lviv	1 - 3	Vorskla Poltava	Lviv
19:30	Tursunov 4' (o.g.) Miroshnichenko (yellow card) 35'; Hitchenko (yellow card) 68'; Kravets (yellow card) 85'; Ksyonz (yellow card) 90'	Summary	Siminin (yellow card) 34'; Barannik 38' 49'; Tkachuk 72'; Bohush (yellow card) 90'	Stadium: Ukraina Stadium; Attendance: 1,000; Referee: (Ukraine) Oleksandr Derdo

1 November 2015 12	Oleksandriya	1 - 1	Vorskla Poltava	Oleksandriya
19:30	Myahkov 18' (yellow card) 74'; Matvyeyev (yellow card) 23'	Summary	Skyyar (yellow card) 20'; Tursunov (yellow card) 26'; Shynder (yellow card) 61' (goal) 78'; Bartulović (yellow card) 73'	Stadium: CSC Nika Stadium; Attendance: 2,714; Referee: (Ukraine) Yaroslav Kozyk

8 November 2015 13	Volyn Lutsk	2 - 1	Vorskla Poltava	Lutsk
14:00	Politylo 4'; Kozban 50'; Polyovyi (yellow card) 51'; Herasymyuk (yellow card) 58'; Kravchenko (yellow card) 63'	Summary	Sklyar (yellow card) 57'; Dytyatev 76'; Shynder (yellow card) 79'; Sapay (yellow card) 87'	Stadium: Avanhard Stadium; Attendance: 2,705; Referee: (Ukraine) Anatoliy Abdula

=== Ukrainian Cup ===
22 August 2015 Round of 32	Desna Chernihiv	1 - 1 (a.e.t.) (2 - 4 p)	Vorskla Poltava	Chernihiv
17:00 EET	Kondratyuk 57'; Sukhomlynov (yellow card) 90+24'	Summary	Dallku 18'; Hromov (yellow card) 36'; Sapay (red card) 50'; Mischenko (yellow card) 52'; Chesnakov (yellow card) 52'	Stadium: Chernihiv Stadium; Attendance: 4,800; Referee: (Ukraine) Maksim Kozyryatskiy

23 September 2015 Round of 16 first leg	Chornomorets Odesa	0 - 1	Vorskla	Odesa
19:00 EET	Petko (yellow card) 38'	Summary	Bartulović (yellow card) 34' (goal) 39'; Siminin (yellow card) 76'	Stadium: Chornomorets Stadium; Attendance: 3,820; Referee: (Ukraine) Oleksandr Ivanov

27 October 2015 Round of 16 second leg	Vorskla	0 - 0	Chornomorets Odesa	Poltava
19:30 EET	Hromov (yellow card) 23'; Tursunov (yellow card) 56'; Sapay (yellow card) 57'; Dallku (yellow card) 69'	Summary	Pereverza (yellow card) 20'; Kalitov (yellow card) 32'; Dmytro Nemchaninov (yellow card) 40'; Smirnov (yellow card) 45+1'; Gardrani (yellow card) 56' (yellow-red card); Korkishko (yellow card) 56'	Stadium: Oleksiy Butovskyi Vorskla Stadium; Attendance: 4,500; Referee: (Ukraine) Sergiy Skrypak

2 March 2016 Quarter Final first leg	Vorskla	0 - 4	Shakhtar Donetsk	Poltava
19:30 EET	Tkachuk (yellow card) 27'; Dytyatev (yellow card) 45' (yellow-red card)	Summary	Kovalenko 4'; Marlos (yellow card) 29'; Ferreyra 55'; Kucher 58'; Wellington Nem 80'	Stadium: Oleksiy Butovskyi Vorskla Stadium; Attendance: 7,000; Referee: (Ukraine) Anatoliy Abdula

27 March 2016 Quarter Final second leg	Shakhtar Donetsk	1 - 2 (5 - 2 agg.)	Vorskla	Kyiv
17:00	Ordets (yellow card) 47'; Bernard 67' (pen.)	Summary	Khlyobas 28' 88'; Siminin (yellow card) 45+1'; Sklyar (yellow card) 46'; Dovhyi (yellow card) 59'; Sapay (yellow card) 72'; Kolomoyets (yellow card) 86'	Stadium: Obolon Arena; Attendance: 2,182; Referee: (Ukraine) Yury Vaks

=== UEFA Europa League ===
==== Qualifying round ====
30 July 2015 Third qualifying round 1st leg	Žilina (Slovakia)	2 – 0	(Ukraine) Vorskla Poltava	Žilina, Slovakia
19:30 CEST (UTC+2)	Paur (yellow card) 13' (goal) 73'; Jelić 26'; Káčer (yellow card) 38'; Škriniar (yellow card) 43'	Summary	Dallku (yellow card) 13'; Sklyar (yellow card) 22'; Kovpak (yellow card) 35'; Sapay (yellow card) 42'; Shynder (yellow card) 50'; Bohush (red card) 90'	Stadium: Štadión pod Dubňom; Attendance: 4,757; Referee: (Croatia) Marijo Strahonja

6 August 2015 Third qualifying round 2nd leg	Vorskla Poltava (Ukraine)	3 – 1 (a. e. t.) (3 – 3 agg.)	(Slovakia) Žilina	Poltava, Ukraine
20:00 EEST (UTC+3)	Y. Tkachuk 90+1' (yellow card) 117'; Tursunov (yellow card) 45' (goal) 101' (pen.); Bartulović (yellow card) 56'; Sklyar (yellow card) 65'; Shynder 67' (yellow card) 81'; Sapay (yellow card) 105'	Summary	Paur (yellow card) 15'; Špalek (yellow card) 35' (yellow-red card) 100'; Škvarka (yellow card) 105' William 120+1'	Stadium: Butovskyi Vorskla Stadium; Attendance: 12,500; Referee: (Azerbaijan) Aliyar Ağayev

- Žilina advance to the play-off round based on away goals rule.
