= 2014–15 FC Vorskla Poltava season =

FC Vorskla Poltava (Ukrainian: ФК «Во́рскла» Полта́ва) is a professional football team which plays in the Ukrainian Premier League and represents the city of Poltava. During the 2014/15 campaign they competed in the Ukrainian Premier League and Ukrainian Cup.

== Competitions ==
=== Premier League ===
==== League table ====
Pos	Team	Pld	W	D	L	GF	GA	GD	Pts	Qualification or relegation
3	Dnipro Dnipropetrovsk	26	16	6	4	47	17	+30	54	Qualification for the Europa League group stage (Note: Since winners of 2014–15 Ukrainian Cup, Dynamo Kyiv, qualified for the 2015–16 UEFA Champions League, the place in the Europa League group stage for the cup winner will be given to the third-placed team and the spots to Europa League third qualifying round will be given to the fourth-placed and fifth-placed teams.)
4	Zorya Luhansk (Note: Zorya Luhansk were initially deducted a total of 3 points on decision of the FFU Control Disciplinary Committee on 18 February 2015, but the decision was reversed and the FFU reinstated the three points to Zorya Luhansk. (17 June 2015))	26	13	6	7	40	31	+9	45	Qualification for the Europa League third qualifying round
5	Vorskla Poltava	26	11	9	6	35	22	+13	42	Qualification for the Europa League third qualifying round
6	Metalist Kharkiv	25	8	11	6	34	32	+2	35	
7	Metalurh Zaporizhya	26	6	8	12	20	40	−20	26	

Source: uafootball.net.ua
Rules for classification: 1) points; 2) goal difference; 3) goals scored; 4) head-to-head points; 5) head-to-head goal difference; 6) head-to-head goals scored; 7) fair play rating

==== Matches ====
27 July 2014 1	Dynamo Kyiv	1–0	Vorskla Poltava	Kyiv
19:00	Bezus 10'; Makarenko (yellow card) 51'; Kravets (yellow card) 58'; Vida (yellow card) 65'	Summary	Dallku (yellow card) 65'	Stadium: NSC Olimpiyskiy; Attendance: 18,630; Referee: Yaroslav Kozyk

1 August 2014 2	Vorskla Poltava	1–2	Shakhtar Donetsk	Poltava
19:00	Hromov 28'; Barannik (yellow card) 31'; Markoski (yellow card) 67'; Tursunov (yellow card) 90+2'; Dallku (red card) 90+2'	Summary	Fernando (yellow card) 11'; Kucher (yellow card) 48' (yellow-red card); Hladkyi 80'; Stepanenko 82'; Douglas Costa (yellow card) 90+2'; Srna (yellow card) 90+2'; Kanibolotskyi (yellow card) 90+4'	Stadium: Oleksiy Butovskyi Vorskla Stadium; Attendance: 8,300; Referee: Kostyantyn Trukhanov

8 August 2014 3	Hoverla Uzhhorod	0–0	Vorskla Poltava	Uzhhorod
19:00	Jagodinskis (yellow card) 21'; Tudose (yellow card) 37'; Lyulka (yellow card) 67'; Trukhin (yellow card) 76'; Raičević (yellow card) 86'; Kaverin (yellow card) 90'	Summary	Hromov (yellow card) 65'	Stadium: Avanhard Stadium; Attendance: 2,650; Referee: Anatoliy Abdula

16 August 2014 4	Vorskla Poltava	2–1	Metalurh Donetsk	Poltava
19:30	Perduta (yellow card) 25'; Sklyar (yellow card) 37' (yellow-red card); Januzi (yellow card) 57'; Hromov 87' 89' (yellow card) 90+2'; Tkachuk (yellow card) 90'	Summary	Nelson 27' (yellow card) 49'; Checher (yellow card) 50' (red card) 55'; Makrides (yellow card) 87'	Stadium: Oleksiy Butovskyi Vorskla Stadium; Attendance: 4,700; Referee: Vitaliy Romanov

31 August 2014 5	Dnipro Dnipropetrovsk	1–1	Vorskla Poltava	Dnipropetrovsk
19:30	Kalinić 49' (pen.); Gama (yellow card) 55'; Shakhov (yellow card) 57'; Kankava (yellow card) 65'	Summary	Barannik 45+1'; Chesnakov (yellow card) 58'; Sapay (yellow card) 62'; Bohush (yellow card) 81'	Stadium: Dnipro-Arena; Attendance: 14,645; Referee: Oleksandr Derdo

14 September 2014 6	Vorskla Poltava	2–0	Karpaty Lviv	Poltava
19:30	Dallku (yellow card) 64'; Sapay (yellow card) 77'; Dedechko 80'; Kovpak 88'; Januzi (yellow card) 90+3'	Summary	Kozhanov (yellow card) 23'; Daushvili (yellow card) 72'; Balažic (yellow card) 79'	Stadium: Oleksiy Butovskyi Vorskla Stadium; Attendance: 7,000; Referee: Dmytro Kutakov

20 September 2014 7	Metalurh Zaporizhzhia	0–3	Vorskla Poltava	Zaporizhzhia
17:00	Serginho (yellow card) 12'; Pashayev (yellow card) 52'; Lysytskyi (yellow card) 78'	Summary	Januzi 10'; Tursunov (yellow card) 54' (goal) 73'; Tkachuk 90+4'	Stadium: Slavutych-Arena; Attendance: 4,000; Referee: Oleksandr Ivanov

3 October 2014 8	Volyn Lutsk	2–2	Vorskla Poltava	Lutsk
19:00 EET	Babenko (yellow card) 40' (yellow-red card); Bicfalvi 53' (pen.); Mariotto 85' (pen.) (yellow card) 86'; Matei (yellow card) 88'	Summary	Dallku (yellow card) 32'; Tursunov 78'; Dedechko 87'	Stadium: Avanhard Stadium; Attendance: 4,000; Referee: Serhiy Boyko

18 October 2014 9	Vorskla Poltava	0–0	Metalist Kharkiv	Poltava
17:00 EET	Dedechko (yellow card) 34'; Januzi (yellow card) 75'; Tursunov (yellow card) 90+2'	Summary	Yussuf (yellow card) 16'; Krasnopyorov (yellow card) 65'; Edmar (yellow card) 72'; Villagra (yellow card) 74'; Torres (yellow card) 81'; Berezovchuk (yellow card) 90'	Stadium: Oleksiy Butovskyi Vorskla Stadium; Attendance: 10,600; Referee: Viktor Shvetsov

1 November 2014 10	Vorskla Poltava	0–0	Illichivets Mariupol	Poltava
17:00 EET	Markoski (yellow card) 86'; Dallku (yellow card) 90+4'	Summary	Datsenko (yellow card) 32'; Oberemko (yellow card) 58'; Churilov (yellow card) 76'; Totovytskyi (yellow card) 88'; Tsyupa (yellow card) 90+4'	Stadium: Oleksiy Butovskyi Vorskla Stadium; Attendance: 2,100; Referee: Yuriy Moseychuk

8 November 2014 11	Chornomorets Odesa	1–0	Vorskla Poltava	Odesa
19:30 EET	Arzhanov (yellow card) 4'; Fomin 15'; Teikeu (yellow card) 31'; Kutas (yellow card) 82'; Nazarenko (yellow card) 90+3'	Summary	Sklyar (yellow card) 63'; Dedechko (red card) 85'	Stadium: Chornomorets Stadium; Attendance: 10,857; Referee: Serhiy Dankovskyi
