= Mykola Matviyenko =

Ukrainian footballer

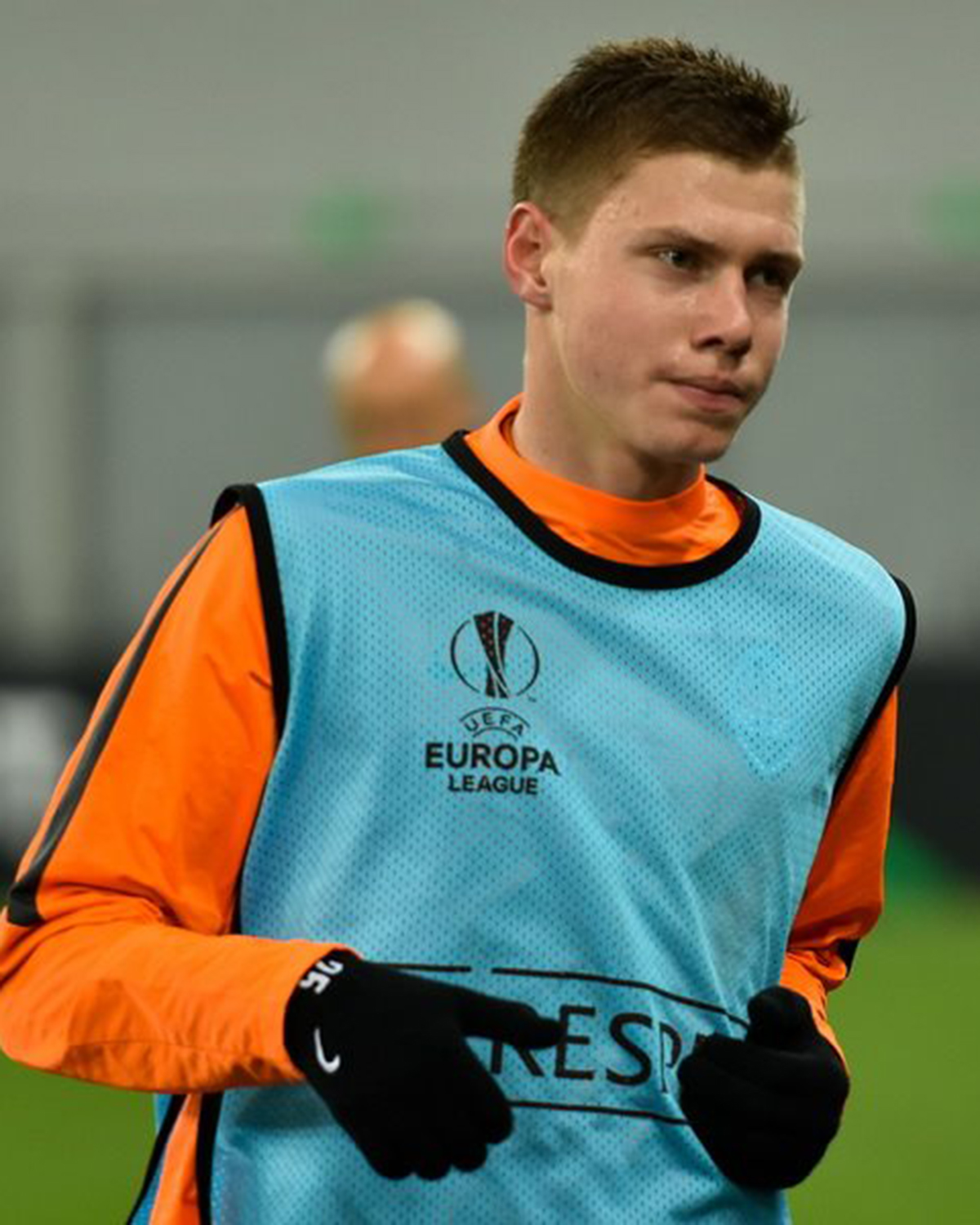
- Matviyenko warming up for Shakhtar Donetsk in 2016

Personal information
- Full name: Mykola Oleksandrovych Matviyenko
- Date of birth: 2 May 1996 (age 30)
- Place of birth: Saky, Ukraine
- Height: 1.82 m (6 ft 0 in)
- Positions: Centre-back; left-back

Team information
- Current team: Shakhtar Donetsk
- Number: 22

Youth career
- 2009–2015: Shakhtar Donetsk

Senior career*
Years	Team	Apps	(Gls)
2015–	Shakhtar Donetsk	192	(15)
2017	→ Karpaty Lviv (loan)	14	(1)
2017	→ Vorskla Poltava (loan)	16	(0)

International career^{‡}
2013	Ukraine U18	6	(0)
2014–2015	Ukraine U19	16	(0)
2016	Ukraine U20	1	(0)
2016–2017	Ukraine U21	6	(0)
2017–	Ukraine	88	(0)
- * Club domestic league appearances and goals as of 24 October 2026 ‡ National team caps and goals as of 18 November 2026

Mykola Oleksandrovych Matviyenko (Ukrainian: Мико́ла Олекса́ндрович Матвіє́нко; born 2 May 1996) is a Ukrainian professional footballer who plays as a centre-back or left-back for Shakhtar Donetsk and the Ukraine national team.

== Club career ==
Matvienko was born in Saky, AR Crimea, Ukraine. He is a product of the Shakhtar Donetsk youth sportive school and signed a contract with the Ukrainian Premier League club in 2013.

He played three years for the Shakhtar Donetsk youth team in the Ukrainian Premier League Reserves Championship and in summer 2015 was promoted to the main-squad team in the Ukrainian Premier League. He made his debut for FC Shakhtar in a match against FC Chornomorets Odesa on 3 October 2015 in the Ukrainian Premier League.

On 21 March 2023, Shakhtar Donetsk announced that Matviyenko had signed a new contract with the club until 31 December 2027.

== International career ==
His debut in Ukraine national team was in March 2017 against Croatia national team. He was a part of national team in UEFA Euro 2020 and UEFA Euro 2024.

== Personal life ==
His older brother Dmytro Matviyenko is also a professional football player. Since 2015 Dmytro plays in the Crimean Premier League.

== Career statistics ==
=== Club ===
As of match played 3 November 2026

Appearances and goals by club, season and competition
Club	Season	League			Ukrainian Cup		Europe		Other		Total	
Club	Season	Division	Apps	Goals	Apps	Goals	Apps	Goals	Apps	Goals	Apps	Goals
Shakhtar Donetsk	2015–16	Ukrainian Premier League	2	0	4	0	0	0	0	0	6	0
Shakhtar Donetsk	2016–17	Ukrainian Premier League	0	0	1	0	2 (Note: Appearances in UEFA Europa League)	0	0	0	3	0
Shakhtar Donetsk	2017–18	Ukrainian Premier League	3	0	1	0	0	0	0	0	4	0
Shakhtar Donetsk	2018–19	Ukrainian Premier League	18	3	3	0	6 (Note: Five appearances in UEFA Champions League, one appearance in UEFA Europa League)	0	0	0	27	3
Shakhtar Donetsk	2019–20	Ukrainian Premier League	26	1	1	0	12 (Note: Six appearances in UEFA Champions League, six appearances in UEFA Europa League)	0	0	0	39	1
Shakhtar Donetsk	2020–21	Ukrainian Premier League	20	1	0	0	8 (Note: Four appearances in UEFA Champions League, four appearances in UEFA Europa League)	0	1 (Note: Appearance in Ukrainian Super Cup)	0	29	1
Shakhtar Donetsk	2021–22	Ukrainian Premier League	14	1	0	0	8 (Note: Appearances in UEFA Champions League)	0	1	0	23	1
Shakhtar Donetsk	2022–23	Ukrainian Premier League	28	2	—		10 (Note: Six appearances in UEFA Champions League, four appearances in UEFA Europa League)	0	—		38	2
Shakhtar Donetsk	2023–24	Ukrainian Premier League	23	3	2	0	7 (Note: Five appearances and one goal in UEFA Champions League, two appearances and one goal in UEFA Europa League)	2	—		32	5
Shakhtar Donetsk	2024–25	Ukrainian Premier League	22	3	3	0	8	0	—		33	3
Shakhtar Donetsk	2025–26	Ukrainian Premier League	27	0	1	0	15 (Note: Five appearances in UEFA Europa League, ten appearances in UEFA Conference League)	0	0	0	43	0
Shakhtar Donetsk	2026–27	Ukrainian Premier League	9	1	1	0	4	0	—		14	1
Shakhtar Donetsk	Total		192	15	17	0	80	2	2	0	291	17
Karpaty Lviv (loan)	2016–17	Ukrainian Premier League	14	1	0	0	—		—		14	1
Vorskla Poltava (loan)	2017–18	Ukrainian Premier League	16	0	3	0	—		—		19	0
Career total			222	15	20	0	80	2	2	0	324	17

=== International ===
As of match played 17 November 2026

Appearances and goals by national team and year
National team	Year	Apps	Goals
Ukraine	2017	7	0
Ukraine	2018	9	0
Ukraine	2019	10	0
Ukraine	2020	4	0
Ukraine	2021	17	0
Ukraine	2022	7	0
Ukraine	2023	7	0
Ukraine	2024	13	0
Ukraine	2025	8	0
Ukraine	2026	6	0
Total		88	0

== Honours ==
Shakhtar Donetsk

- Ukrainian Premier League: 2017–18, 2018–19, 2019–20, 2022–23, 2023–24
- Ukrainian Cup: 2015–16, 2016–17, 2017–18, 2018–19, 2023–24, 2024–25
- Ukrainian Super Cup: 2021
