= Ihor Perduta =

Ukrainian footballer

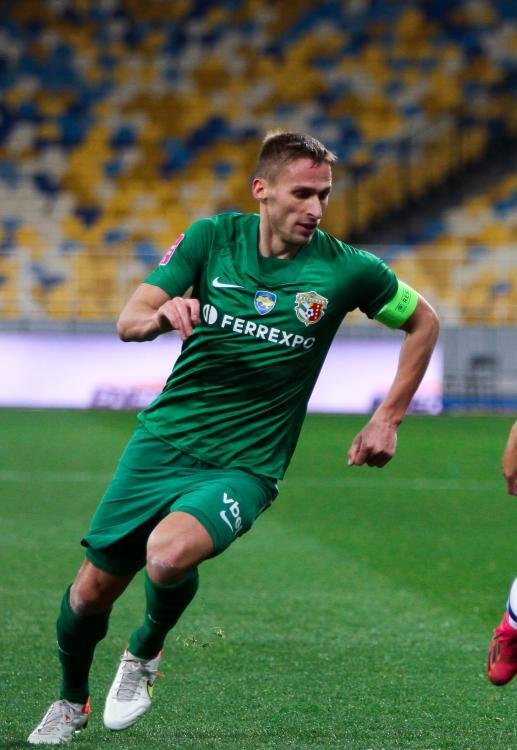

Personal information
- Full name: Ihor Romanovych Perduta
- Date of birth: 15 November 1990 (age 35)
- Place of birth: Terebovlia, Ukrainian SSR
- Height: 1.76 m (5 ft 9 in)
- Position: Defender

Team information
- Current team: Zorya Luhansk
- Number: 44

Youth career
- 1998–2002: Nyva Terebovlya
- 2002–2006: Nadiya Kopychyntsi

Senior career*
Years	Team	Apps	(Gls)
2007–2009	Ternopil		
2009	Nyva Ternopil	8	(0)
2010–2025	Vorskla Poltava	299	(3)
2012	→ Obolon Kyiv (loan)	12	(0)
2025–	Zorya Luhansk	20	(2)
- * Club domestic league appearances and goals as of 3 June 2026

Ihor Romanovych Perduta (Ukrainian: Ігор Романович Пердута; born 15 November 1990) is a Ukrainian professional footballer who plays as a defender for Zorya Luhansk in the Ukrainian Premier League.

== Club career ==
Perduta is a product of the Nyva Terebovlya and Nadiya Kopychyntsi academies, training under Oleh Stremynskyi.

In 2012, he was promoted to the Vorskla Poltava senior squad, making his Ukrainian Premier League debut on 10 May.

== International career ==
He was called up to the senior Ukraine squad for a World Cup qualifier against Croatia in October 2017.

== Career statistics ==
=== Club ===
As of match played 23 May 2025

Appearances and goals by club, season and competition
Club	Season	League			Cup		Continental		Other		Total	
Club	Season	Division	Apps	Goals	Apps	Goals	Apps	Goals	Apps	Goals	Apps	Goals
Nyva Ternopil	2008–09	Ukrainian Second League	8	0	0	0	0	0	0	0	8	0
Vorskla Poltava	2010–11	Ukrainian Premier League	0	0	0	0	0	0	0	0	0	0
Vorskla Poltava	2011–12	Ukrainian Premier League	1	0	1	0	0	0	0	0	2	0
Vorskla Poltava	2012–13	Ukrainian Premier League	10	0	0	0	0	0	0	0	10	0
Vorskla Poltava	2013–14	Ukrainian Premier League	28	1	2	0	0	0	0	0	30	1
Vorskla Poltava	2014–15	Ukrainian Premier League	15	0	2	0	0	0	0	0	17	0
Vorskla Poltava	2015–16	Ukrainian Premier League	13	0	4	0	1	0	0	0	18	0
Vorskla Poltava	2016–17	Ukrainian Premier League	28	0	2	0	2	0	0	0	32	0
Vorskla Poltava	2017–18	Ukrainian Premier League	30	0	2	0	0	0	0	0	32	0
Vorskla Poltava	2018–19	Ukrainian Premier League	27	0	1	0	6	0	0	0	34	0
Vorskla Poltava	2019–20	Ukrainian Premier League	24	2	4	0	0	0	0	0	28	2
Vorskla Poltava	2020–21	Ukrainian Premier League	22	0	2	0	0	0	0	0	24	0
Vorskla Poltava	2021–22	Ukrainian Premier League	18	0	1	0	2	0	0	0	21	0
Vorskla Poltava	2022–23	Ukrainian Premier League	27	0	0	0	2	0	0	0	29	0
Vorskla Poltava	2023–24	Ukrainian Premier League	28	0	4	0	2	0	0	0	34	0
Vorskla Poltava	2024–25	Ukrainian Premier League	28	0	1	0	0	0	0	0	29	0
Vorskla Poltava	Total		299	3	26	0	15	0	0	0	340	3
Obolon Kyiv (loan)	2012–13	Ukrainian First League	12	0	1	0	0	0	0	0	13	0
Career total			319	3	27	0	15	0	0	0	361	3
