= Vyacheslav Sharpar =

Ukrainian footballer (1987–2026)

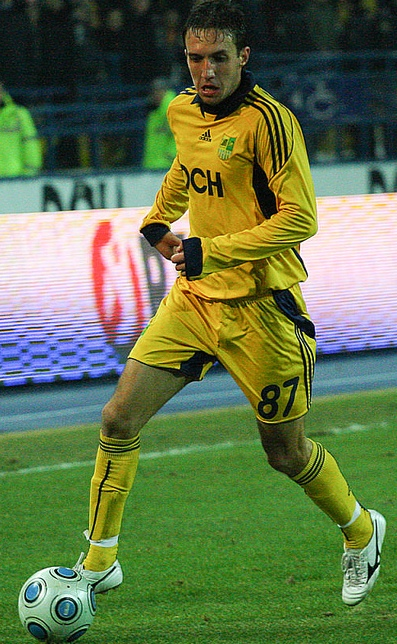

Personal information
- Full name: Vyacheslav Volodymyrovych Sharpar
- Date of birth: 2 June 1987
- Place of birth: Zelenodolsk, Ukrainian SSR, USSR
- Date of death: 2 June 2026 (aged 39)
- Place of death: Loutraki, Greece
- Height: 1.90 m (6 ft 3 in)
- Positions: Central defender; defensive midfielder

Youth career
- 1999–2001: Sportive School Zelenodolsk
- 2001–2004: FC Torpedo-Kosmos Zaporizhya

Senior career*
Years	Team	Apps	(Gls)
2004	Nafkom Brovary	9	(1)
2005–2006	Tavriya Simferopol	0	(0)
2006	→ Khimik Krasnoperekopsk (loan)	14	(3)
2007–2008	Naftovyk-Ukrnafta Okhtyrka	21	(0)
2008	→ Illichivets Mariupol (loan)	11	(1)
2009	Desna Chernihiv	12	(2)
2009–2011	Volyn Lutsk	43	(0)
2011–2015	Metalist Kharkiv	16	(0)
2011–2012	→ Volyn Lutsk (loan)	24	(0)
2013	→ Arsenal Kyiv (loan)	20	(2)
2014	→ Hoverla Uzhhorod (loan)	9	(3)
2014	→ Metalurh Donetsk (loan)	7	(0)
2015	Volyn Lutsk	11	(1)
2015	Sheriff Tiraspol	1	(0)
2015	Volyn Lutsk	10	(5)
2016	Atyrau	20	(3)
2017–2019	Vorskla Poltava	69	(14)
2019–2020	Riga	18	(2)
2021	Volyn Lutsk	13	(2)

International career
2007	Ukraine U21	2	(0)
- * Club domestic league appearances and goals

Vyacheslav Volodymyrovych Sharpar (Ukrainian: В'ячеслав Володимирович Шарпар; 2 June 1987 – 2 June 2026) was a Ukrainian professional footballer who played as a central defender and defensive midfielder. He was product of Zelenodolsk youth sportive school. He drowned in Loutraki, Greece on 2 June 2026, at the age of 39.

== Honours ==
Riga

- Latvian Higher League: 2019, 2020

Sheriff Tiraspol

- Moldovan Super Cup: 2016
