= Andro Giorgadze =

Georgian footballer

Personal information
- Full name: Andro Giorgadze
- Date of birth: 3 May 1996 (age 30)
- Place of birth: Tbilisi, Georgia
- Height: 1.97 m (6 ft 6 in)
- Position: Centre back

Team information
- Current team: Kokand 1912
- Number: 44

Youth career
- Merani Martvili

Senior career*
Years	Team	Apps	(Gls)
2015–2017	Merani Martvili	45	(2)
2017–2019	Vorskla Poltava	18	(0)
2019	Fastav Zlín	2	(0)
2020	Karpaty Lviv	6	(0)
2020	Torpedo Kutaisi	3	(0)
2021	Samtredia	31	(0)
2022	Lokomotiv Tbilisi	19	(1)
2023	Mash'al	16	(4)
2024–	Kokand 1912	58	(5)

International career
2017–2018	Georgia U-21	7	(0)
- * Club domestic league appearances and goals as of 28 July 2026

Andro Giorgadze (Georgian: ანდრო გიორგაძე; born 3 May 1996) is a Georgian professional footballer who plays as a defender who plays for Kokand 1912.

== Career ==
Giorgadze is a product of Georgian Merani Martvili youth sportive school system. He signed contract with this team and played in the Erovnuli Liga.

In July 2017 he signed 2 years deal with the Ukrainian FC Vorskla Poltava.
