= Vadym Chervak =

Ukrainian footballer

Personal information
- Full name: Vadym Vitaliiovych Chervak
- Date of birth: 27 May 1999 (age 27)
- Place of birth: Monastyryska, Ukraine
- Height: 1.85 m (6 ft 1 in)
- Positions: Centre back; defensive midfielder

Team information
- Current team: Vorskla Poltava
- Number: 29

Youth career
- 2011–2012: Prykarpattia Ivano-Frankivsk
- 2012–2017: Dynamo Kyiv
- 2017: Shakhtar Donetsk
- 2017–2018: Vorskla Poltava
- 2018: Sparta Prague

Senior career*
Years	Team	Apps	(Gls)
2018	Vorskla Poltava	1	(0)
2018–2022	Sparta Prague B	15	(2)
2019	→ Vlašim (loan)	8	(0)
2019	→ Zemplín Michalovce (loan)	5	(0)
2022–2023	Polissya Zhytomyr	12	(0)
2023–2024	Metalist 1925 Kharkiv	17	(0)
2025	FSC Mariupol	8	(0)
2025–	Vorskla Poltava	12	(0)

International career^{‡}
2016	Ukraine U17	2	(0)
- * Club domestic league appearances and goals as of 3 June 2026 ‡ National team caps and goals as of 19 November 2021

Vadym Vitaliiovych Chervak (Ukrainian: Вадим Віталійович Червак; born 27 May 1999) is a Ukrainian professional footballer who plays as a defender for Vorskla Poltava.

== Club career ==
=== MFK Zemplín Michalovce ===
Chervak made his professional Fortuna Liga debut for Zemplín Michalovce against Senica on 18 August 2019 in a 3:0 home victory. Chervak played the full match.
