= Oleksiy Lutsenko =

Ukrainian footballer

Personal information
- Full name: Oleksiy Mykolayovych Lutsenko
- Date of birth: 3 March 1997 (age 29)
- Place of birth: Ukraine
- Height: 1.74 m (5 ft 8 1/2 in)
- Position: Defender

Youth career
- 2010–2011: Olimpik Kharkiv
- 2011: FC Molod Poltava
- 2012–2014: Vorskla Poltava

Senior career*
Years	Team	Apps	(Gls)
2015–2018	Vorskla Poltava	1	(0)
- * Club domestic league appearances and goals as of 23 August 2017

Oleksiy Lutsenko (Ukrainian: Олексій Миколайович Луценко; born 3 March 1997) is a football defender.

== Career ==
Lutsenko was born in Ukraine. Lutsenko is a product of the different youth sportive school systems.

In 2014 he signed contract with FC Vorskla and continued his career as player in the Ukrainian Premier League Reserves. And in summer 2017 Lutsenko was promoted to the main-squad team of FC Vorskla in the Ukrainian Premier League. He made his debut as a substituted player for Vorskla Poltava in the Ukrainian Premier League in a match against FC Stal Kamianske on 12 August 2017.
