= Yuriy Hlushchuk =

Ukrainian footballer

Yuriy Hluschuk
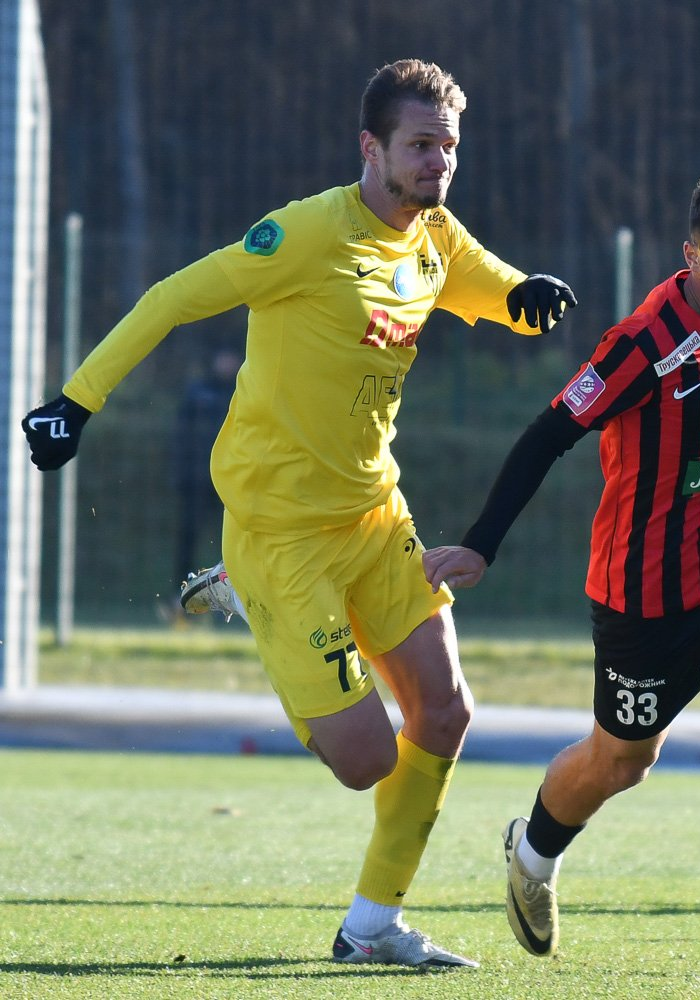

Personal information
- Full name: Yuriy Ruslanovych Hluschuk
- Date of birth: 16 January 1995 (age 31)
- Place of birth: Irpin, Ukraine
- Height: 1.89 m (6 ft 2 in)
- Position: Midfielder

Team information
- Current team: Bukovyna Chernivtsi
- Number: 77

Youth career
- 2010: Dobro Kyiv
- 2010–2011: Hart-Ros Irpin
- 2012: Shakhtar Donetsk

Senior career*
Years	Team	Apps	(Gls)
2012–2017	Shakhtar Donetsk	0	(0)
2014	→ Shakhtar-3 Donetsk	12	(3)
2015–2016	→ Illichivets Mariupol (loan)	23	(0)
2018	Vorskla Poltava	1	(0)
2019–2020	Kremin Kremenchuk	4	(0)
2020	Lokomotiv Yerevan	10	(1)
2020–2021	Rubikon Kyiv	31	(1)
2021–2022	Olimpik Donetsk	15	(0)
2022	Energia Kozienice		
2022–2024	Epitsentr Dunaivtsi	46	(2)
2024–	Bukovyna Chernivtsi	17	(0)

International career
2013	Ukraine U19	1	(0)
- * Club domestic league appearances and goals as of 24 December 2025

Yuriy Ruslanovych Hluschuk (Ukrainian: Юрій Русланович Глущук; born 16 January 1995) is a Ukrainian professional footballer who plays as a midfielder for Bukovyna Chernivtsi.

== Career ==
Born in Irpin, Hluschuk is a product of the FC Hart-Ros Irpin and FC Shakhtar youth sportive schools.

In July 2015, he went on loan for the Ukrainian First League club FC Illichivets Mariupol.

== International career ==
He was called up for the Ukraine national under-21 football team by Serhiy Kovalets in January 2015, but not spent any match for this representation.
