= Dmytro Khlyobas =

Ukrainian footballer (born 1994)

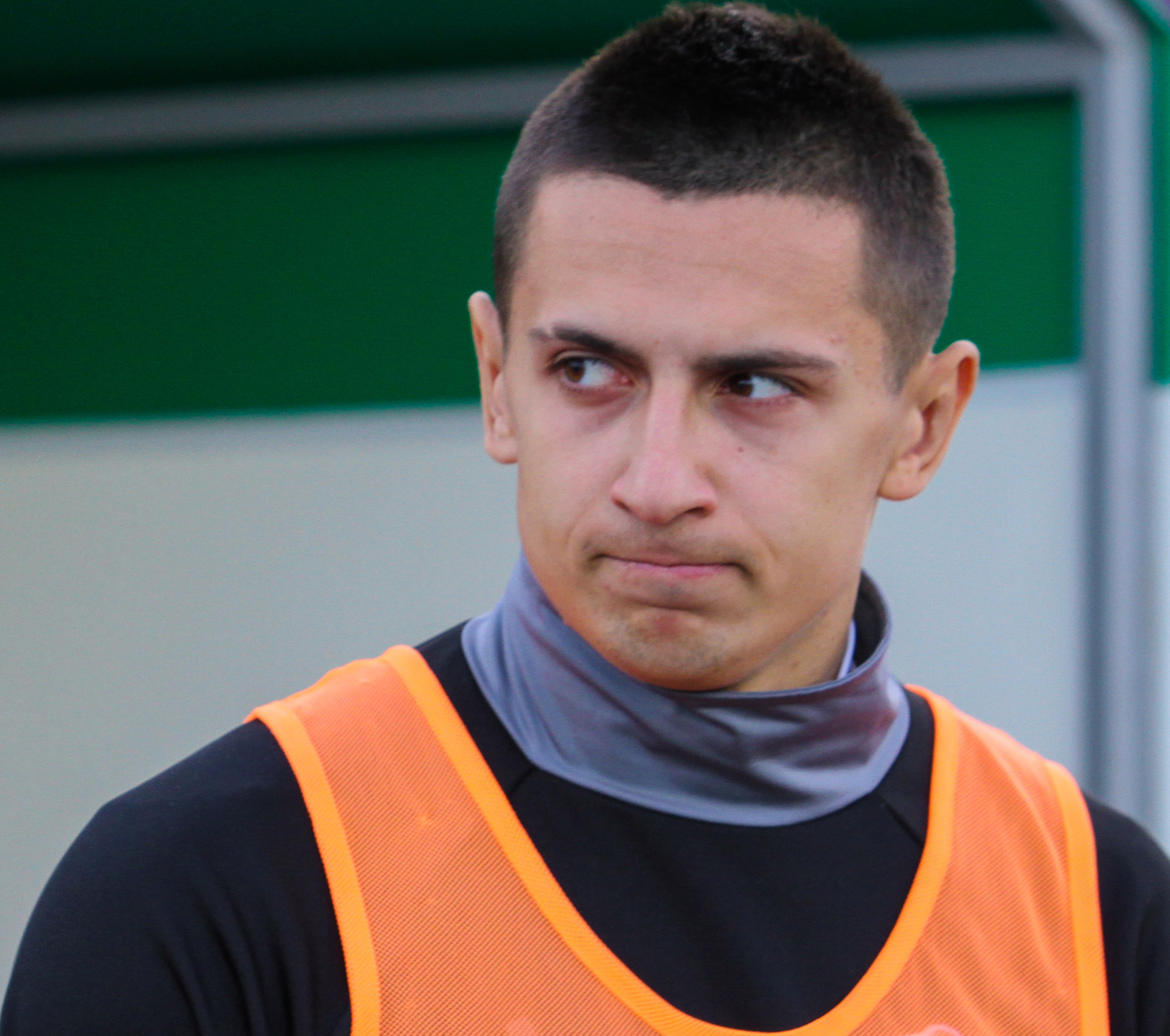

Personal information
- Full name: Dmytro Viktorovych Khlyobas
- Date of birth: 9 May 1994 (age 32)
- Place of birth: Lokhvytsia, Ukraine
- Height: 1.78 m (5 ft 10 in)
- Position: Forward

Youth career
- 2008–2011: Dynamo Kyiv

Senior career*
Years	Team	Apps	(Gls)
2011–2018	Dynamo Kyiv	2	(1)
2013–2014	→ Dynamo-2 Kyiv	29	(10)
2015	→ Hoverla Uzhhorod (loan)	26	(8)
2016–2017	→ Vorskla Poltava (loan)	37	(11)
2017	→ Dinamo Minsk (loan)	15	(6)
2018–2020	Desna Chernihiv	47	(11)
2021	Kolos Kovalivka	6	(0)
2021	Ordabasy	8	(1)
2022–2023	Urartu	38	(12)
2023	Kyzylzhar	6	(0)

International career^{‡}
2010	Ukraine U16	5	(3)
2009–2011	Ukraine U17	23	(4)
2011–2012	Ukraine U18	13	(4)
2012	Ukraine U19	8	(2)
2014–2015	Ukraine U21	9	(3)
- * Club domestic league appearances and goals as of 20 November 2023 ‡ National team caps and goals as of 24 December 2021

Dmytro Khlyobas (Ukrainian: Дмитро Вікторович Хльобас; born 9 May 1994) is a Ukrainian professional footballer who plays as a forward.

== Career ==
He is the product of FC Dynamo Kyiv sportive school. He made his debut for FC Dynamo entering as a second-half substitute against FC Metalurh Donetsk on 17 November 2012 in the Ukrainian Premier League.

=== FC Vorskla Poltava ===
From 2016 he joyed on loan for FC Vorskla Poltava and he got to the quarterfinal of the Ukrainian Cup in the season 2016–17

=== FC Dinamo Minsk ===
In 2017 he went on loan to Dinamo Minsk and he got with the team in UEFA Europa League in the season 2017–18.

=== FC Desna Chernihiv ===
In 2018, he arrived at the FC Desna Chernihiv and with the new club in Ukrainian Premier League in the season 2018–19 he has been elected best player of the round 2. He got into the Quarterfinals of the Ukrainian Cup in the season 2019–20 for the second time of the history with the club of Chernihiv. In Premier League in the season 2019–20, with the club got the 4th place, through the play-offs for the Championship round table, scoring 7 goals. On 13 December 2020, he scored a goal on the 2–0 victory against FC Mariupol in Kyiv at the NSC Olimpiyskiy. On 24 December 2020, his contract with the club was ended, been the club with most appearances.

=== Kolos Kovalivka ===
In January 2021 he moved to Kolos Kovalivka and on 14 February 2021, he made his debut with the new team against Shakhtar Donetsk. He managed to get 4 place in Ukrainian Premier League in season 2020–21 and qualified for the Europa Conference League third qualifying round. On 2 July 2021 he left the club.

=== Ordabasy ===
In summer 2021 he moved to Ordabasy in Kazakhstan Premier League. Here he played 8 matches and scored 1 goal and on 23 December 2021 his contract with the club was ended and both parties decided to not extend.

=== Urartu ===
In February 2022 he signed for Urartu in Armenian Premier League. Here he got into the final of the Armenian Cup in the season 2021–22. On 8 August he scored against Shirak for the Armenian Premier League and on 20 August 2022, he scored three goals against Noah always in Armenian Premier League for the season 2022–23.

== Career statistics ==
=== Club ===
As of match played 27 August 2023

Appearances and goals by club, season and competition
Club	Season	League			National cup (Note: Includes Ukrainian Cup, Belarusian Cup, Armenian Cup)		Europe		Total	
Club	Season	Division	Apps	Goals	Apps	Goals	Apps	Goals	Apps	Goals
Dynamo Kyiv	2012–13	Ukrainian Premier League	1	0	0	0	0	0	1	0
Dynamo Kyiv	2017–18	Ukrainian Premier League	1	1	0	0	0	0	1	1
Dynamo Kyiv	Total		2	1	0	0	0	0	2	1
Dynamo-2 Kyiv	2012–13	Ukrainian First League	0	0	–		–		0	0
Dynamo-2 Kyiv	2013–14	Ukrainian First League	18	4	–		–		18	4
Dynamo-2 Kyiv	2014–15	Ukrainian First League	11	6	–		–		11	6
Dynamo-2 Kyiv	Total		29	10	–		–		29	10
Hoverla Uzhhorod (loan)	2014–15	Ukrainian Premier League	11	4	0	0	–		11	4
Hoverla Uzhhorod (loan)	2015–16	Ukrainian Premier League	15	4	1	0	–		16	4
Hoverla Uzhhorod (loan)	Total		26	8	1	0	–		27	8
Vorskla Poltava (loan)	2015–16	Ukrainian Premier League	8	3	2	2	0	0	10	5
Vorskla Poltava (loan)	2016–17	Ukrainian Premier League	29	8	2	0	2 (Note: Appearances in UEFA Europa League)	0	33	8
Vorskla Poltava (loan)	Total		37	11	4	2	2	0	43	13
Dinamo Minsk (loan)	2017	Belarusian Premier League	15	6	1	0	2	0	18	6
Desna Chernihiv	2018–19	Ukrainian Premier League	21	3	2	1	–		23	4
Desna Chernihiv	2019–20	Ukrainian Premier League	20	7	1	0	–		21	7
Desna Chernihiv	2020–21	Ukrainian Premier League	6	1	1	0	0	0	7	1
Desna Chernihiv	Total		47	11	4	1	0	0	51	12
Kolos Kovalivka	2020–21	Ukrainian Premier League	6	0	0	0	–		6	0
Ordabasy	2021	Kazakhstan Premier League	8	1	0	0	–		8	1
Urartu	2021–22	Armenian Premier League	13	3	7	0	–		20	3
Urartu	2022–23	Armenian Premier League	25	9	2	1	–		27	10
Urartu	Total		38	12	9	1	–		47	13
Kyzylzhar	2023	Kazakhstan Premier League	6	0	0	0	–		6	0
Career total			214	61	19	4	4	0	238	63

== Honours ==
Dynamo Kyiv

- Ukrainian Super Cup: 2018

Urartu

- Armenian Premier League: 2022–23
- Armenian Cup: 2022–23; runner-up: 2021–22

Dinamo Minsk

- Belarusian Premier League runner-up: 2017

Individual

- Ukrainian Premier League best player of round 2: 2018–19

== Gallery ==
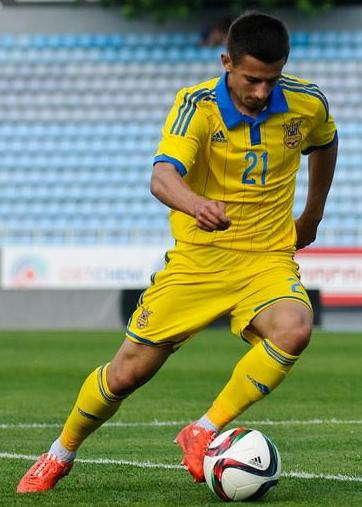

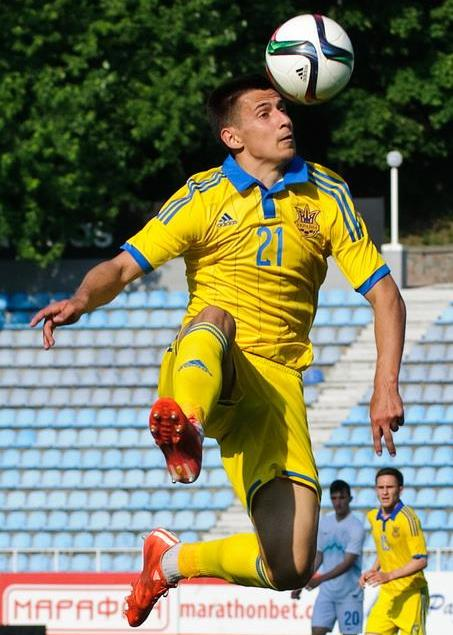
