= Armend Dallku =

Albanian footballer (born 1983)

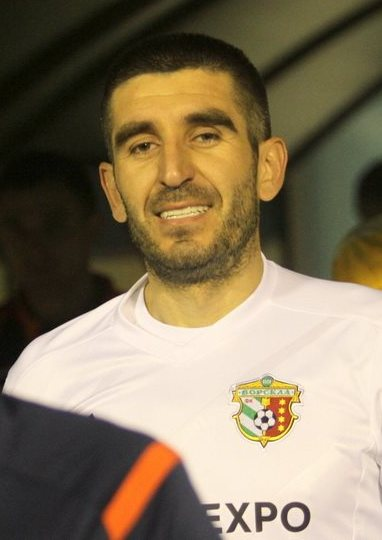
- Dallku with Vorskla Poltava in 2016

Personal information
- Full name: Armend Sabit Dallku
- Date of birth: 16 June 1983 (age 43)
- Place of birth: Vushtrri, SFR Yugoslavia (now Kosovo)
- Height: 1.87 m (6 ft 2 in)
- Positions: Centre-back; right-back

Team information
- Current team: Dukagjini (manager)

Youth career
- 1997–2002: Vushtrria

Senior career*
Years	Team	Apps	(Gls)
2002–2004	Prishtina	47	(1)
2004–2005	Elbasani	23	(0)
2005–2016	Vorskla Poltava	292	(5)
2016–2019	Prishtina	41	(4)
Total		403	(10)

International career
2002–2005	Albania U21	5	(0)
2005–2013	Albania	64	(1)

Managerial career
- 2019: Prishtina U19
- 2019–2020: Prishtina
- 2020–2024: Dukagjini
- 2024–2026: Vushtrria
- 2026–: Dukagjini
- * Club domestic league appearances and goals

Armend Sabit Dallku (born 16 June 1983) is a professional football coach and former player who is the current manager of Dukagjini. Born in Yugoslavia, he represented Albania at under-21 and full international level, collecting 64 international senior caps between years 2005–2013, thus becoming part of top ten of list of Albania international footballers, remaining until March 2017, when he was overwrited by national side captain at the time, Ansi Agolli.

== Club career ==
=== Early career ===
Dallku was born in Vushtrri, and began his career at his hometown club KF Kosova Vushtrri. before transferring to Prishtina. Dallku's professional career started off in 2003 when he signed up with KF Prishtina. He spent the 2002–03 season there. In 2004, he moved to Elbasani, playing 25 games in all competitions.

=== Vorskla Poltava ===
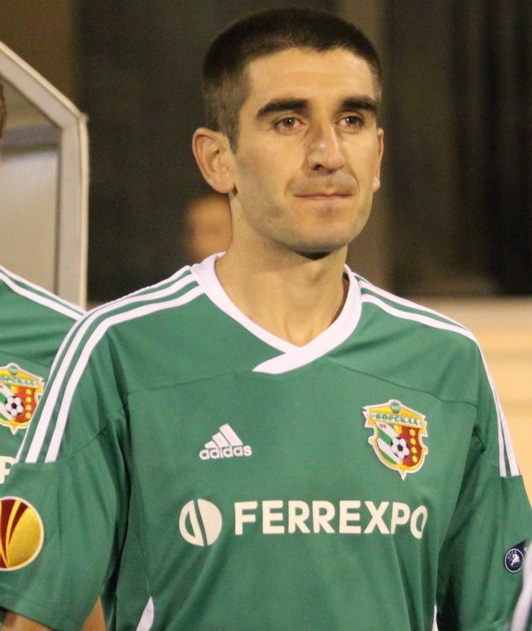
Dallku with Vorskla Poltava in September 2011

In the summer of 2005, Dallku joined Ukrainian side Vorskla Poltava in the Ukrainian Premier League. He became one of the team's key players of the defending line. He scored two goals during the 2006–07 season.

On 1 May 2016, Dallku announced his retirement from professional football at the end of the season via a Facebook status. Fourteen, Dallku played his final match as a professional footballer in a 1–0 home loss to Oleksandriya in the final day of the season, ending thus his 13-year career, 11 of them with Vorskla Poltava.

=== Prishtina ===
On 14 June 2016, Dallku completed a transfer to his first senior club Prishtina, signing a one-year contract, taking the vacant squad number 4. He was presented on the same day along with players such as Ahmed Januzi and Debatik Curri, his former international teammates. Two weeks later, he was prompted new captain after the position was left vacant. Speaking of that, Dallku stated: "It doesn't matter who's the captain. The important thing is the team to work properly."

Dallku made his official debut with the club on 13 August in the Kosovan Supercup, where Prishtina beat 1–0 Feronikeli to win the first silverware of the season. He made his league debut on 19 August in the opening league match against Llapi, playing full-90 minutes in a 3–1 home success. He scored his first goal of the later on 22 October in the matchday 10 against Trepça.

On 14 January 2017, in the yearly ceremony held by Football Federation of Kosovo, Dallku was named in the 2016 Team of the Year along with his teammate Liridon Leci. He played 31 matches and scored one goal as Prishtina finished runner-up in the championship.

== International career ==
Dallku received the Albanian citizenship on 16 August 2004.

In 2004 Dallku became part of the Albania national under-21 team managed by Hasan Lika playing in 4 first matches valid for the 2006 UEFA European Under-21 Championship qualification Group 2 where he completed full 90-minutes in each match, helping the team to take 1 win versus Kazakhstan and 1 draw against Greece.

His performances resulted in a call up from Senior team by coach Hans-Peter Briegel for the 2006 FIFA World Cup qualification (UEFA) 5th game against Ukraine on 9 February 2005. Briegel decided to give the 20-year-old defender a start as a centre-back on his debut against a very strong Ukraine side. Although he played well he was unable to stop Ukraine from scoring two goals on either side of the interval. He became regular part of the senior side as he was called up for the March's matches playing the full match against Turkey as right-back where Albania lost 2–0. In the next game against Greece coach Briegel left Dallku on the bench, bringing him on in the 85th minute with score at 2–0, though he was unable to change anything as Albania lost again. Dallku was returned to U-21 for June's matches playing the full 90-minutes against Denmark in a heavy defeat 7–0. He returned soon to senior side being an unused substitute against Kazakhstan on 3 September 2005, match won by Albania 2–1. He returned in action in October's month playing the full match against Ukraine as a centre-back in a 2–2 draw. Then 4 days later in the closing match against Turkey he played in the starting line up as a centre-back, receiving a yellow card in the 22nd minute with Albania losing home 0–1 by a 58th-minute goal where Dallku was replaced in the 63rd minute.

He scored his first goal in a FIFA World Cup 2010 qualifier against Malta on 10 September 2008. The match ended 3–0 to Albania, which sent them to the top of their group ahead of giant teams such as Portugal, Sweden and Denmark.

He retired from international football on 6 March 2014 with 64 senior international caps and one goal. Dallku announced that he will play one last game against Kosovo, which was played on 13 November in Pristina. However, Dallku didn't play but was mentioned.

== Personal life ==
Dallku's younger brother, Ardin (born 1 November 1994), is also a footballer who plays also as a defender and from 2012 to 2016 both brothers played each other at Vorskla Poltava.

== Career statistics ==
=== Club ===
As of 4 November 2017

Appearances and goals by club, season and competition
Club	Season	League			Cup		Europe		Other		Total	
Club	Season	Division	Apps	Goals	Apps	Goals	Apps	Goals	Apps	Goals	Apps	Goals
Prishtina	2002–03	Football Superleague of Kosovo	30	0	0	0	—		—		30	0
Prishtina	2003–04	Football Superleague of Kosovo	17	1	0	0	—		—		17	1
Prishtina	Total		47	1	0	0	—		—		47	1
Elbasani	2004–05	Albanian Superliga	23	0	—		—		—		23	0
Vorskla Poltava	2005–06	Ukrainian Premier League	25	0	—		—		—		25	0
Vorskla Poltava	2006–07	Ukrainian Premier League	28	2	—		—		—		28	2
Vorskla Poltava	2007–08	Ukrainian Premier League	27	0	2	0	—		—		29	0
Vorskla Poltava	2008–09	Ukrainian Premier League	28	0	4	0	—		—		32	0
Vorskla Poltava	2009–10	Ukrainian Premier League	29	0	1	0	2 (Note: Appearance(s) in UEFA Europa League)	0	1	0	33	0
Vorskla Poltava	2010–11	Ukrainian Premier League	29	1	1	0	—		—		30	1
Vorskla Poltava	2011–12	Ukrainian Premier League	26	1	2	0	11	0	—		39	1
Vorskla Poltava	2012–13	Ukrainian Premier League	28	0	1	0	—		—		29	0
Vorskla Poltava	2013–14	Ukrainian Premier League	28	1	2	0	—		—		30	1
Vorskla Poltava	2014–15	Ukrainian Premier League	22	0	4	0	—		—		26	0
Vorskla Poltava	2015–16	Ukrainian Premier League	22	0	5	1	2	0	—		29	1
Vorskla Poltava	Total		292	5	22	1	15	0	1	0	330	6
Prishtina	2016–17	Football Superleague of Kosovo	29	1	2	0	—		1 (Note: Appearance in Kosovar Supercup)	0	32	1
Prishtina	2017–18	Football Superleague of Kosovo	12	3	0	0	2	0	—		14	3
Prishtina	Total		41	4	2	0	2	0	1	0	46	4
Career total			403	10	24	1	17	0	2	0	446	11

=== International ===
As of 25 October 2015

Appearances and goals by national team and year
National team	Year	Apps	Goals
Albania	2005	7	0
Albania	2006	6	0
Albania	2007	9	0
Albania	2008	6	1
Albania	2009	8	0
Albania	2010	8	0
Albania	2011	8	0
Albania	2012	8	0
Albania	2013	4	0
Total		64	1

Albania score listed first, score column indicates score after each Dallku goal.

International goals by date, venue, cap, opponent, score, result and competition
No.	Date	Venue	Cap	Opponent	Score	Result	Competition
1	10 September 2008	Qemal Stafa Stadium, Tirana, Albania	26	Malta	2–0	3–0	2010 FIFA World Cup qualification

== Honours ==
Prishtina

- Kosovar Superliga: 2003–04
- Kosovar Supercup: 2016

Vorskla Poltava

- Ukrainian Cup: 2008–09

Individual

- Football Superleague of Kosovo Team of the Year: 2016
- Sport Master in Ukraine
