= Sanzhar Tursunov =

Uzbekistani footballer

Sanjhar Tursunov Санжар Турсунов
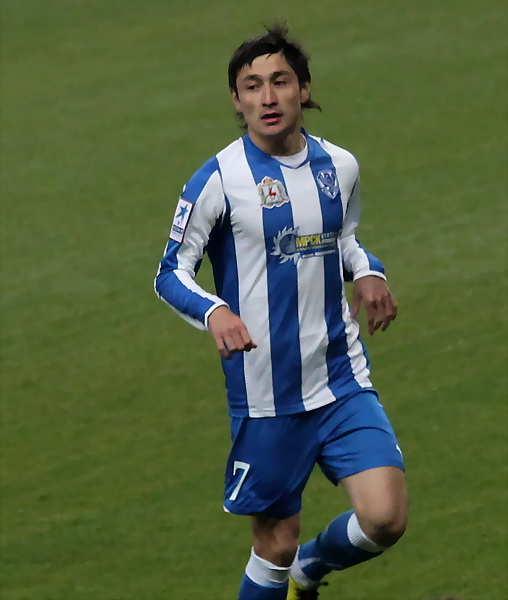

Personal information
- Full name: Sanzhar Atkhamovich Tursunov
- Date of birth: 29 December 1986 (age 39)
- Place of birth: Tashkent, Uzbek SSR
- Height: 1.73 m (5 ft 8 in)
- Position: Midfielder

Youth career
- Pakhtakor Tashkent

Senior career*
Years	Team	Apps	(Gls)
2006–2008	Irtysh-1946 Omsk	86	(13)
2009–2011	Volga Nizhny Novgorod	102	(9)
2012	Alania Vladikavkaz	22	(2)
2013	Lokomotiv Tashkent	11	(0)
2013	Gazovik Orenburg	16	(2)
2014–2015	Vorskla Poltava	52	(8)
2016	Umm Salal	11	(0)
2016	Vorskla Poltava	12	(3)
2017–2018	Al Kharaitiyat	34	(4)
2018–2019	Daejeon Citizen	27	(2)
2019	Bunyodkor	9	(1)
2020–2024	AGMK	93	(12)
2024	Lokomotiv Tashkent	20	(1)

International career^{‡}
2010–	Uzbekistan	49	(5)
- * Club domestic league appearances and goals as of 4/9/24 @ 16:11(AEST) ‡ National team caps and goals as of 16 October 2019

Sanzhar Tursunov (Uzbek: Sanjar Atham oʻgʻli Tursunov; Russian: Санжар Атхамович Турсунов; born 29 December 1986) is an Uzbekistani professional footballer.

== Club career ==
=== Pakhtakor ===
He played for the youth team of the club and in 2006 moved to Russian football club FC Irtysh Omsk.

=== Irtysh Omsk ===
He played his first game for Irtysh Omsk on 23 April 2006. The first goal for the club he scored three days later in a match against Kuzbass Kemerovo from the second division. Up to the end of the season 2008 he played 86 matches and scored 13 goals.

=== FC Volga ===
In January 2009 he moved to Volga Nizhny Novgorod which promoted to Russian First Division. In the 2009 season Volga finished only 4th. One year later Volga gained promotion to the Russian Premier League and Tursunov scored 5 goals in the league and became one of the top assisting players of the First Division with 10 goal assists. In the 2010 season Sanzhar Tursunov scored 7 goals and 10 assists, playing 39 matches for Volga.

=== Alania Vladikavkaz ===
On 31 December 2011 he moved to Alania Vladikavkaz and signed a contract for 3.5 years.

=== Lokomotiv Tashkent ===
On 21 February 2013 Tursunov signed a contract with Lokomotiv Tashkent.

== Honours ==
=== Club ===
Volga

- Russian First Division runner-up: 2010

=== International ===
- AFC Asian Cup 4th: 2011

=== Individual ===
- Uzbekistan Footballer of the Year : 2012

== Career statistics ==
=== International ===
Goals for Senior National Team

#	Date	Venue	Opponent	Score	Result	Competition
1.	15 November 2011	Tashkent, Uzbekistan	Tajikistan	3–0	Won	2014 FIFA World Cup qualification
2.	7 September 2012	Tashkent, Uzbekistan	Kuwait	3–0	Won	Friendly
3.	11 September 2012	Tashkent, Uzbekistan	South Korea	2–2	Draw	2014 FIFA World Cup qualification
4.	16 October 2012	Doha, Qatar	Qatar	1–0	Won	2014 FIFA World Cup qualification
Correct as of 16 October 2012
