= Yuriy Kolomoyets =

Ukrainian footballer

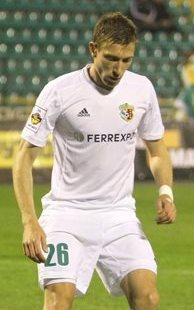

Personal information
- Full name: Yuriy Mykolayovych Kolomoyets
- Date of birth: 22 March 1990 (age 36)
- Place of birth: Kryvyi Rih, Soviet Union (now Ukraine)
- Height: 1.90 m (6 ft 3 in)
- Position: Striker

Team information
- Current team: Mynai
- Number: 26

Youth career
- 1999–2004: Kryvbas Kryvyi Rih
- 2004: Molod Poltava
- 2004–2007: Kryvbas Kryvyi Rih

Senior career*
Years	Team	Apps	(Gls)
2007–2009	Kryvbas Kryvyi Rih	0	(0)
2007	→ Kryvbas-3 Kryvyi Rih (amateurs)	19	(5)
2008	→ Naftovyk-Ukrnafta Okhtyrka (loan)	10	(0)
2010–2012	Hirnyk Kryvyi Rih	74	(38)
2013–2016	Oleksandriya	71	(14)
2016	Vorskla Poltava	21	(8)
2017	MTK Budapest	12	(2)
2017–2019	Vorskla Poltava	69	(13)
2020	Levadia Tallinn	24	(9)
2021	Istiklol	0	(0)
2021	Volyn Lutsk	12	(0)
2021–2022	Polissya Zhytomyr	11	(2)
2022–	Mynai	10	(0)

International career^{‡}
2017	Ukraine	1	(0)
- * Club domestic league appearances and goals as of 12 May 2023 ‡ National team caps and goals as of 20 November 2021

Yuriy Mykolayovych Kolomoyets (Ukrainian: Юрій Миколайович Коломоєць; born 22 March 1990) is a Ukrainian professional footballer who plays as a striker for Mynai.

== Career ==
Kolomoyets is a product of the Kryvbas Kryvyi Rih youth sportive school systems. His first trainer was Volodymyr Udod.

On 14 February 2021, Kolomoyets began training with Tajik Champions Istiklol.
