= Oleksandr Tkachenko (footballer, born 1993) =

Ukrainian footballer

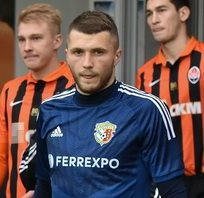

Personal information
- Full name: Oleksandr Ihorovych Tkachenko
- Date of birth: 19 February 1993 (age 33)
- Place of birth: Ukrainka, Ukraine
- Height: 1.92 m (6 ft 3 1/2 in)
- Position: Goalkeeper

Youth career
- 2007: Vidradnyi Kyiv
- 2007–2010: Dynamo Kyiv

Senior career*
Years	Team	Apps	(Gls)
2010–2013	Dynamo Kyiv	0	(0)
2013–2022	Vorskla Poltava	48	(0)
2017	→ Hirnyk-Sport Horishni Plavni (loan)	2	(0)

International career^{‡}
2011	Ukraine U18	2	(0)
2011–2012	Ukraine U19	11	(0)
2014	Ukraine U21	3	(0)
- * Club domestic league appearances and goals as of 4 January 2023 ‡ National team caps and goals as of 4 January 2023

Oleksandr Ihorovych Tkachenko (Ukrainian: Олександр Ігорович Ткаченко; born 19 February 1993) is a Ukrainian professional footballer who plays as a goalkeeper.

== Career ==
Tkachenko is a product of the FC Vidradnyi Kyiv and FC Dynamo Kyiv youth sportive systems.

He spent his career in the Ukrainian Premier League Reserves club FC Dynamo Kyiv. In June 2013 Tkachenko signed a contract with FC Vorskla in the Ukrainian Premier League. He made his debut for Vorskla Poltava in the Ukrainian Premier League in a match against FC Shakhtar Donetsk on 9 August 2015.
