= Oleksiy Butovsky Vorskla Stadium =

Sports stadium in Poltava, Ukraine

Coordinates: 49°35′41″N 34°32′58″E

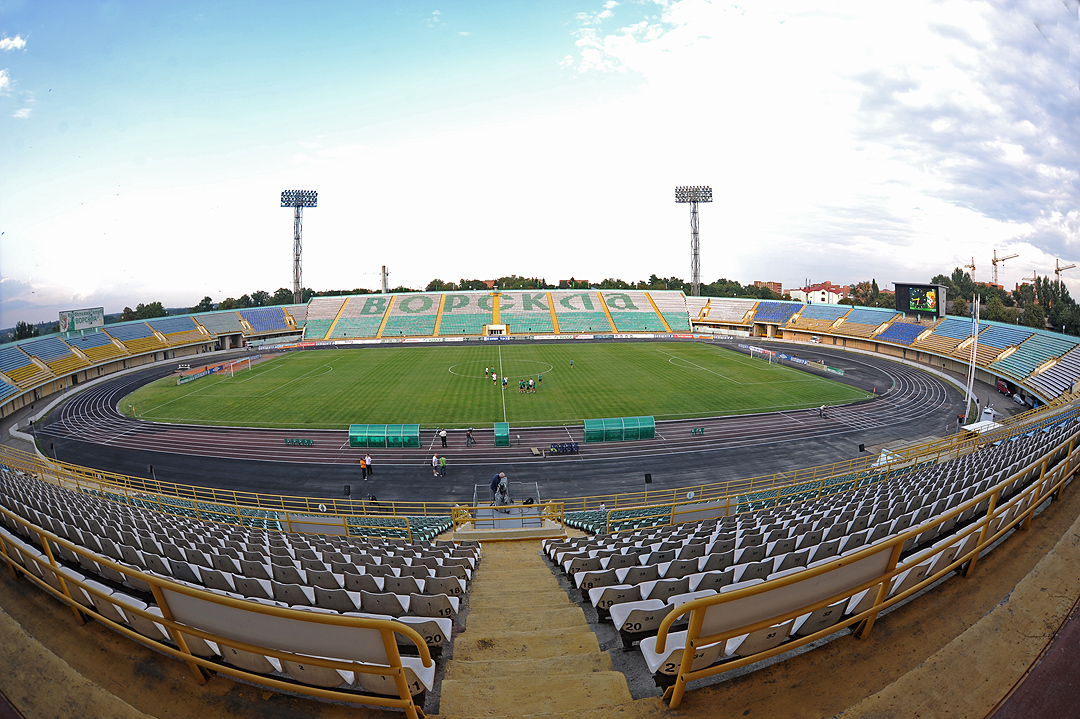
- UEFA Category 1 Stadium
- Interactive map of Oleksiy Butovsky Vorskla Stadium
- Former names: Urozhai Stadium (1951–1956); Kolhospnyk Stadium (1956–1963); Kolos Stadium (1956–1990); Vorskla Stadium (1990–2008); Oleksiy Butovsky Vorskla Stadium (2008–)
- Location: Poltava, Ukraine
- Owner: unknown
- Capacity: 24,795
- Surface: Grass
- Field size: 104 m × 68 m (341 ft × 223 ft)

Construction
- Opened: 2 May 1951; 75 years ago

Tenant
- Vorskla Poltava (1955-present)

Oleksiy Butovsky Vorskla Stadium (Ukrainian: Стадіон «Ворскла» імені Олексія Бутовського, Stadion "Vorskla" imeni Oleksiya Butovskoho) is a multi-purpose stadium in Poltava, Ukraine. It is currently used mostly for football matches and is the home of FC Vorskla Poltava.

The stadium is the biggest in the region of Poltava (Poltava Oblast) and, with a seating capacity of 24,795, it is just outside of the top 10 biggest stadiums in the country by seating capacity. The stadium is used primarily by the FC Vorskla teams, such as the main squad and the women's squad.

== Location ==
The stadium is located on Independence Square (Dzerzhinskiy Square during the Soviet period). It is located near the city's center, just north of the Poltava Round Square, which was created in the mid-19th century to glorify the Russian victory in the Battle of Poltava. Next to the stadium is an indoor swimming pool in the Palace of Sports "Spartak" and the city's "House of Culture". Not far from the stadium is the Poltava Oblast State Administration. The stadium facilities house the sports school #5 and the Vorskla football academy, known as the Horpynka sports school.

== History ==
The stadium was built in the open area, which before was used by the Poltava hippodrome that existed before the World War I from 1852 to 1917. Before World War II, it was used by a local aviation school. In 1951, the Urozhai (Harvest) stadium was built with a seating capacity for 7,500 spectators for events related to the local exhibition of achievements of the National Economy (Soviet Economy). Since 1955, it has been the home stadium of FC Vorskla (Kolos, previously). Following its first renovations when the stadium obtained its modern look in 1974, the stadium was reopened during the city's celebration commemorating the 800th anniversary of the city of Poltava.

The stadium has undergone several reconstructions, most notably in 2000, when the facade of the stadium was renovated. In 2008, the most notable feature of the restoration was the installation of a colored screen. The renovation was done for the Ukrainian Super Cup, which was played at the stadium. The cup has traveled outside of Odessa for the first time due to renovation works at Chornomorets Stadium, the annual venue for the title game. In 2006, the stadium was renamed in honor of Oleksiy Butovsky.

== Notable games ==
- 2008, the Ukrainian Super Cup (Dynamo vs Shakhtar)
- 2011, the Ukrainian Super Cup (Dynamo vs Shakhtar)
- 2014, the Ukrainian Cup final (Dynamo vs Shakhtar)
- 2016 an international friendly (Ukraine U-21 vs Belarus U-21)

== Gallery ==
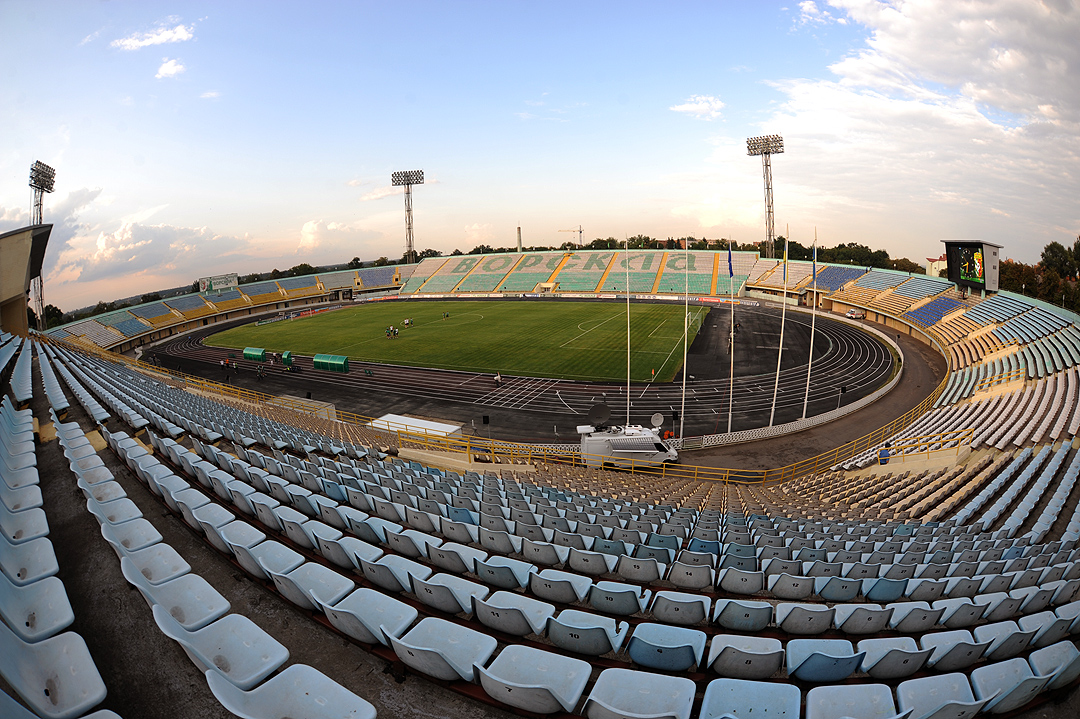
View from the central stand

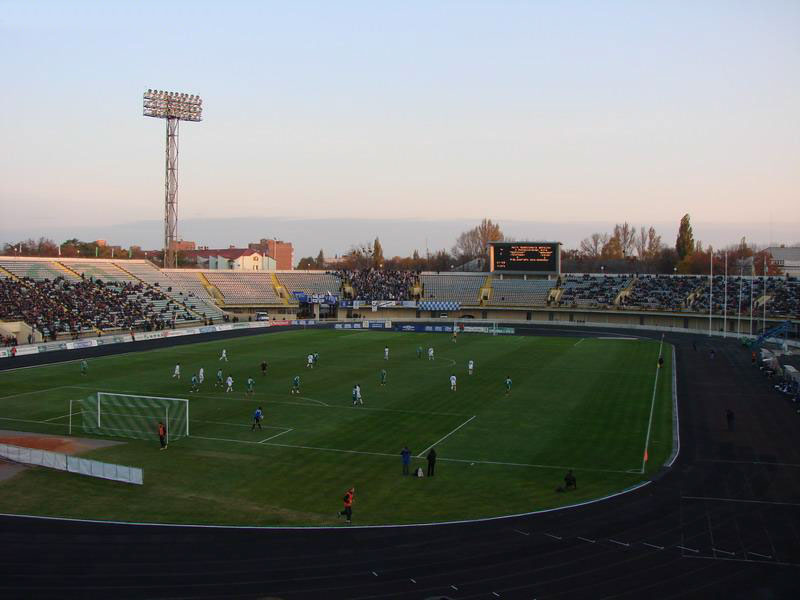
Stadium in 2007

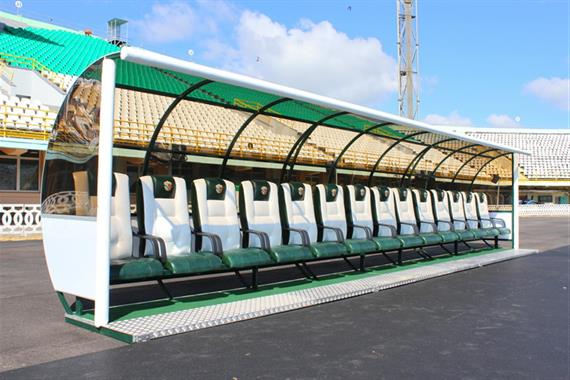

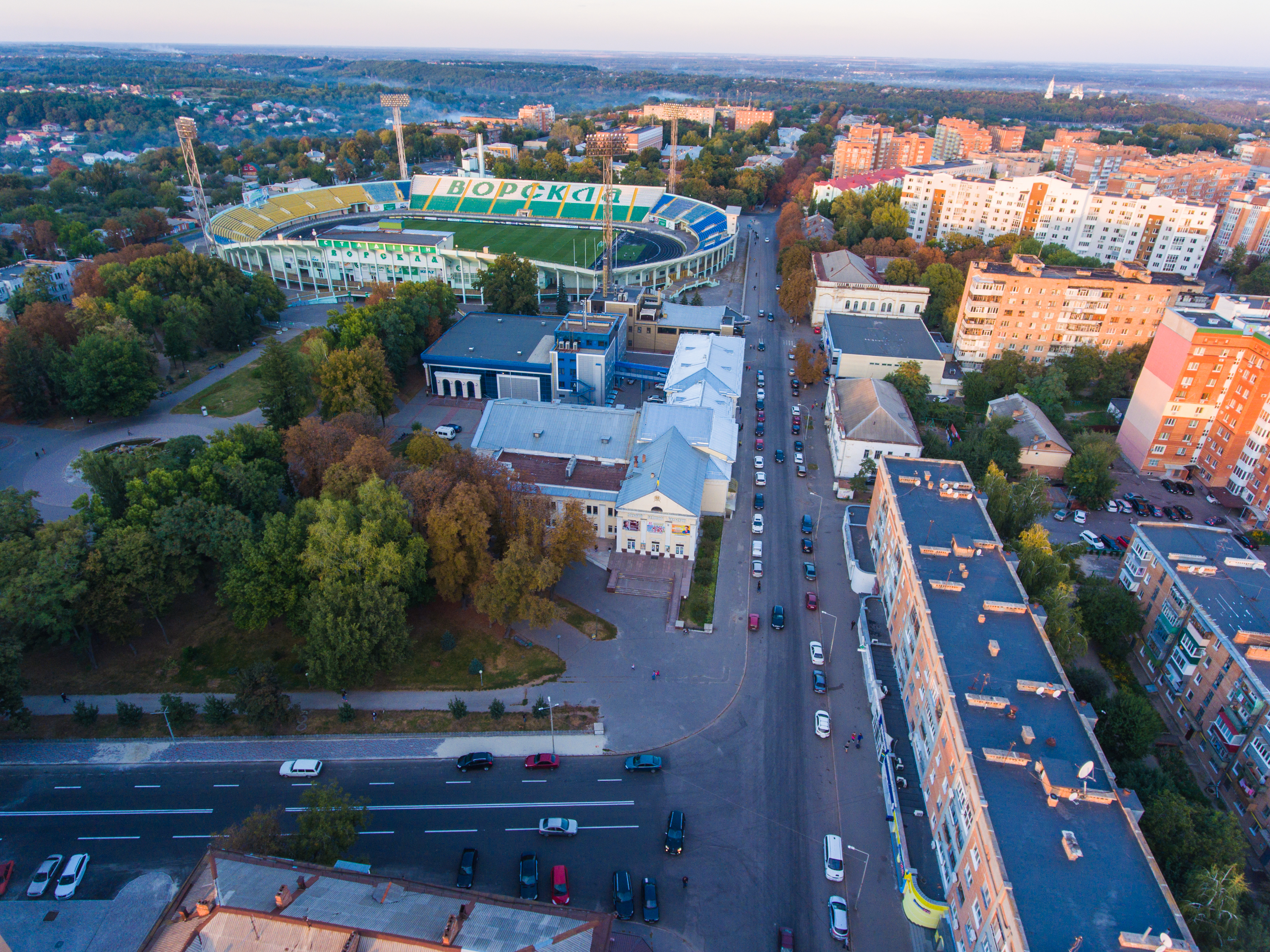
Aerial view at the stadium and nearby buildings

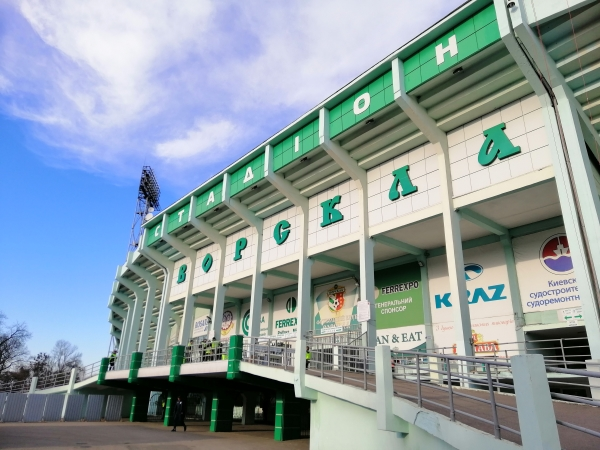
Side view with the club's name

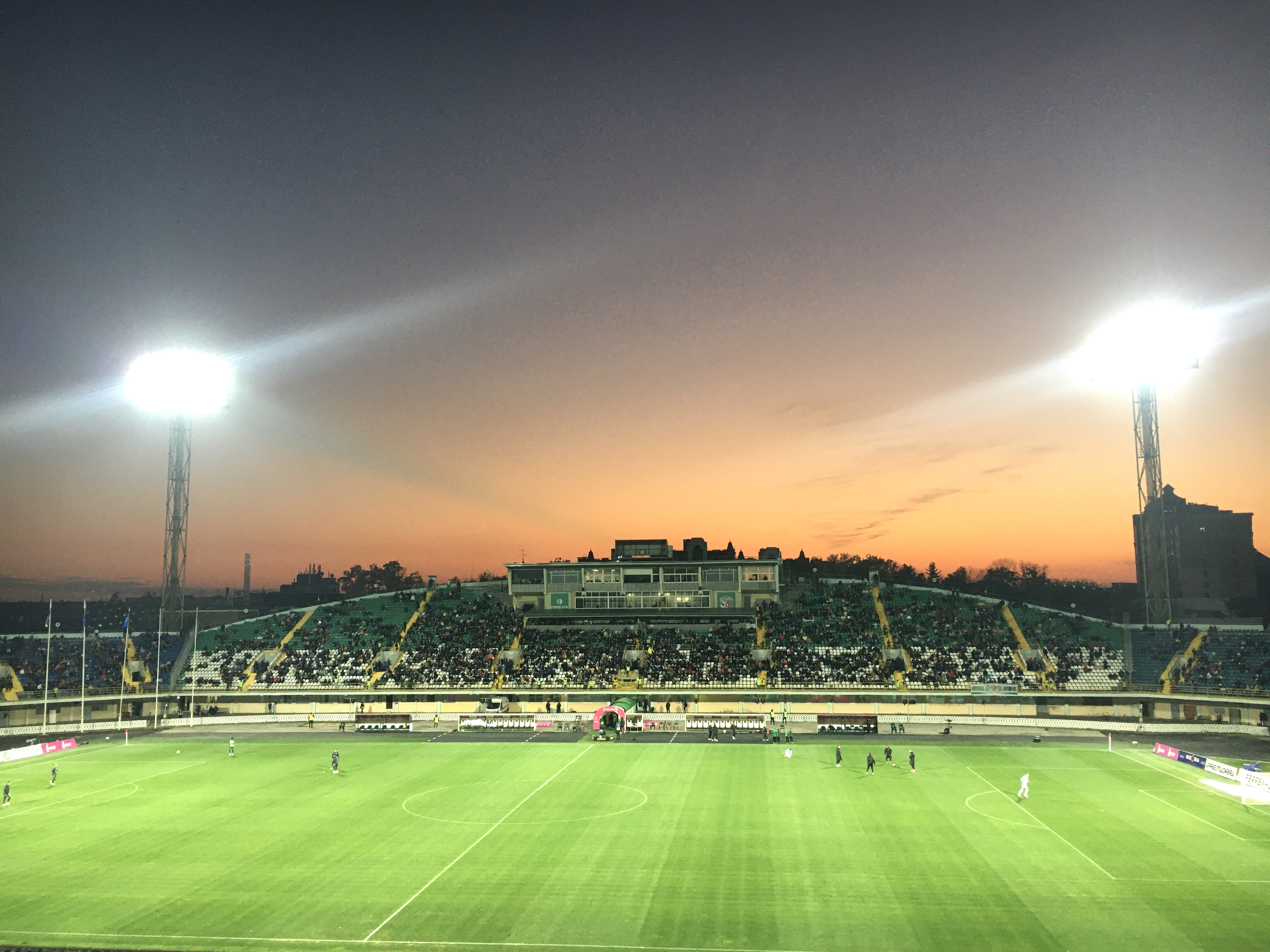
View of the main stand

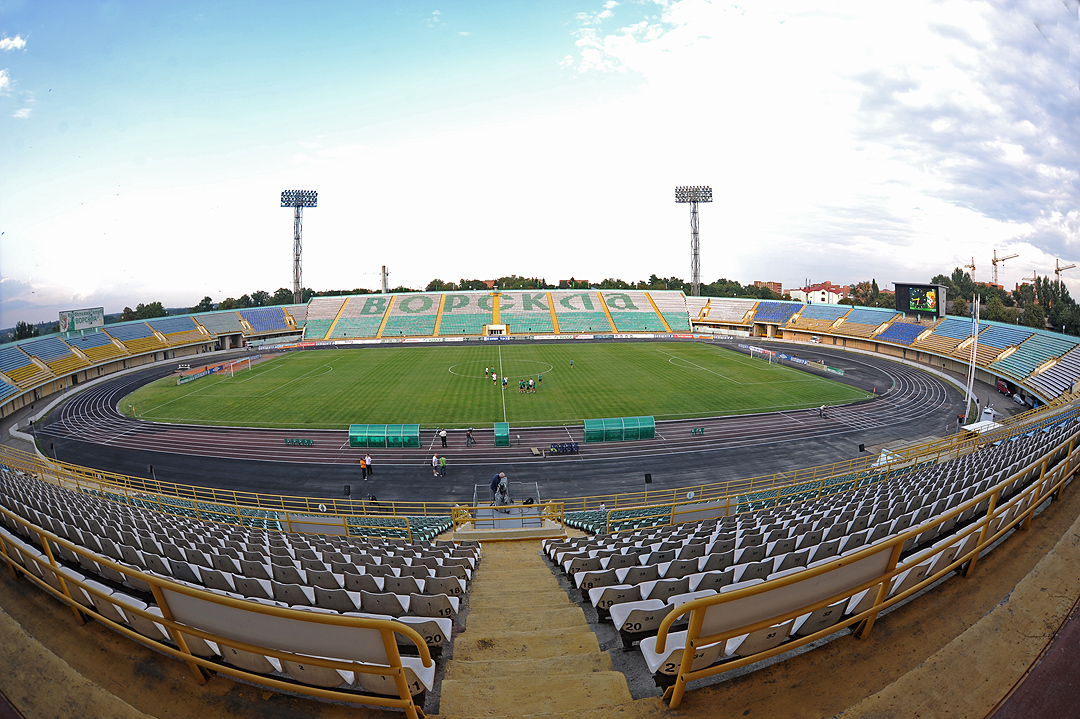
Panoramic view of the pitch and smaller stands
