= Artem Hromov =

Ukrainian footballer

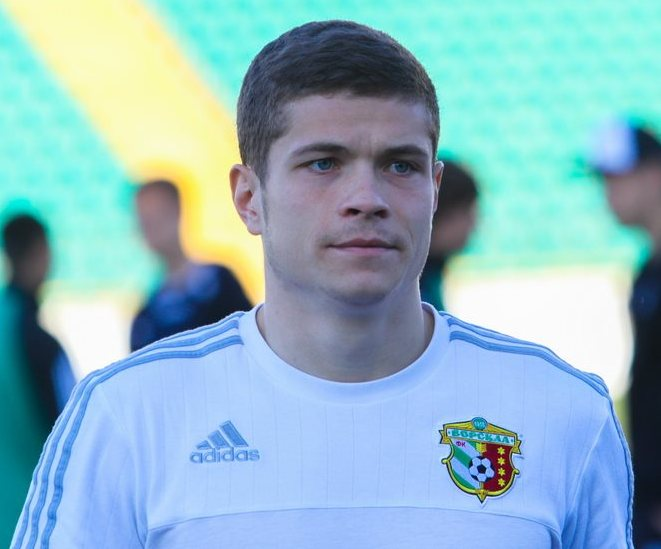

Personal information
- Full name: Artem Ihorovych Hromov
- Date of birth: 14 January 1990 (age 36)
- Place of birth: Stryi, Soviet Union (now Ukraine)
- Height: 1.78 m (5 ft 10 in)
- Position: Centre-forward

Team information
- Current team: Union Mauer
- Number: 17

Youth career
- 2003: CYSS im. Horpynka Poltava
- 2004–2007: Molod Poltava
- 2007–2010: Vorskla Poltava

Senior career*
Years	Team	Apps	(Gls)
2010–2016	Vorskla Poltava	132	(25)
2016–2017	Dynamo Kyiv	9	(0)
2017	Krylia Sovetov Samara	3	(0)
2017–2022	Zorya Luhansk	103	(23)
2022–2023	Dnipro-1	9	(1)
2023	AEK Larnaca	13	(0)
2024–	Union Mauer	41	(9)

International career^{‡}
2010	Ukraine U20	2	(0)
2010	Ukraine U21	1	(0)
2014	Ukraine	2	(0)
- * Club domestic league appearances and goals as of 28 June 2026 ‡ National team caps and goals as of 3 March 2017

Artem Ihorovych Hromov (Ukrainian: Артем Ігорович Громов; born 14 January 1990) is a Ukrainian professional footballer who plays as a centre-forward for Austrian Regioanlliga East club Union Mauer.

== Career ==
=== Vorksla Poltava ===
He is a product of the Vorskla Poltava sport school.

He made his debut in playing for Vorskla Poltava in Ukrainian Premier League on match against Illichivets Mariupol on 3 April 2010. On 30 May 2016, Hromov terminated his contract with Vorskla upon mutual agreement, having only 6 months left in his contract.

=== Dynamo Kyiv ===
On 31 May 2016, Hromov signed a 3-year contract with the Ukrainian champions Dynamo Kyiv.

== Honours ==
=== Club ===
Dynamo Kyiv

- Ukrainian Super Cup: 2016
