= Oleksandr Sklyar =

Ukrainian footballer

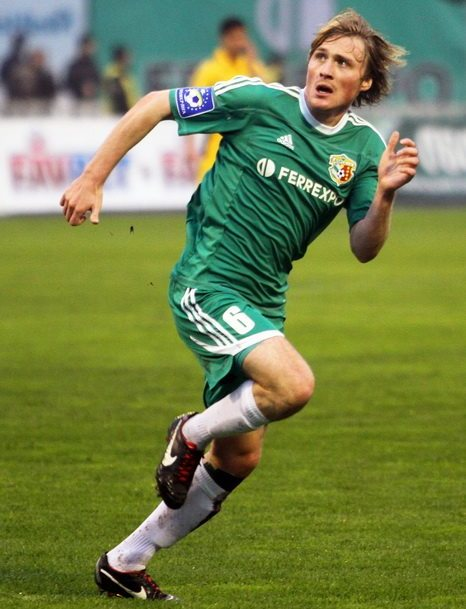

Personal information
- Full name: Oleksandr Serhiyovych Sklyar
- Date of birth: 26 February 1991 (age 35)
- Place of birth: Kharkiv, Ukrainian SSR
- Height: 1.75 m (5 ft 9 in)
- Position: Midfielder

Team information
- Current team: UCSA Tarasivka
- Number: 17

Youth career
- 200?–2004: Youth Sportive School #13 Kharkiv
- 2004–2008: UFK Kharkiv

Senior career*
Years	Team	Apps	(Gls)
2008–2010	Kharkiv	25	(0)
2010–2012	Zirka Kirovohrad	44	(2)
2012–2025	Vorskla Poltava	251	(15)
2025–2026	Chornomorets Odesa	28	(2)
2026–	UCSA Tarasivka	2	(0)

International career^{‡}
2007	Ukraine U16	12	(1)
2007–2008	Ukraine U17	11	(0)
2008	Ukraine U18	1	(0)
- * Club domestic league appearances and goals as of 14 August 2026 ‡ National team caps and goals as of 7 October 2012

Oleksandr Serhiyovych Sklyar (Ukrainian: Олександр Сергійович Скляр; born 26 February 1991) is a Ukrainian professional footballer who plays as a midfielder.

== Career ==
Sklyar is the product of the Youth Sportive School #13 and UFK Kharkiv's Youth Systems, and his first trainer was Valeriy Ryzhykh.

Sklyar's professional career continue, when he was promoted to Kharkiv's reserves during the 2008-09 season. And in 2009 he made his debut for the Ukrainian Premier League.

=== Chornomorets Odesa ===
On 14 July 2025, Sklyar joined Chornomorets Odesa. On 2 August 2025 in the 1st round match of the Ukrainian First League between FC Chornomorets and Nyva Ternopil he made his official debut and scored his first goal as a player of Chornomorets. Sklyar left the team on June 30, 2026.

On 30 July 2026, Sklyar joined UCSA Tarasivka.

== Honours ==
Chornomorets Odesa

- Ukrainian First League runner-up: 2025–26
