= Andriy Tkachuk =

Ukrainian footballer

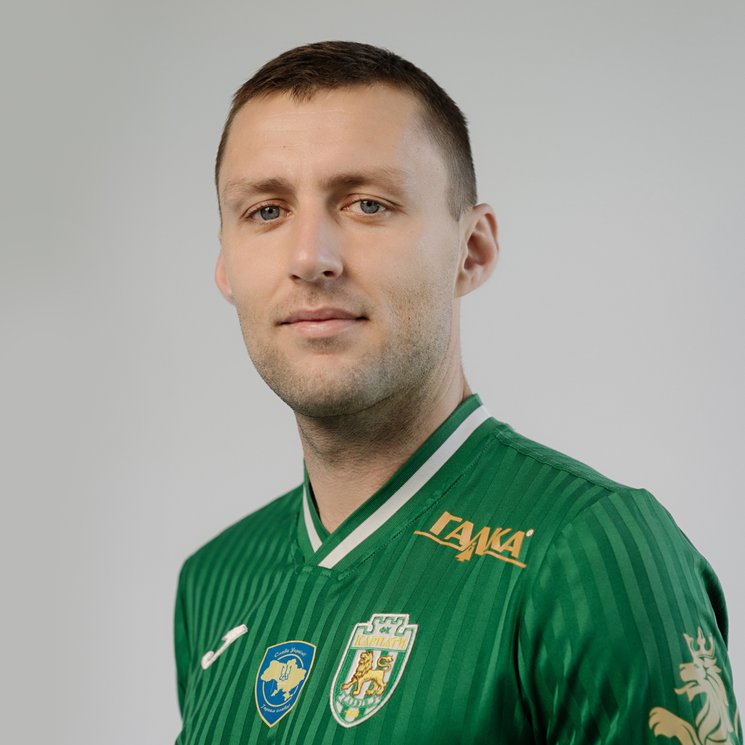

Personal information
- Full name: Andriy Mykolayovych Tkachuk
- Date of birth: 18 November 1987 (age 38)
- Place of birth: Zhytomyr, Ukrainian SSR
- Height: 1.81 m (5 ft 11 in)
- Position: Midfielder

Team information
- Current team: Feniks-Mariupol
- Number: 21

Youth career
- 2001–2004: Polissya Zhytomyr

Senior career*
Years	Team	Apps	(Gls)
2004	Polissya Zhytomyr	5	(0)
2005–2014	Karpaty Lviv	151	(5)
2005–2007	→ Karpaty-2 Lviv	61	(13)
2013	→ Arsenal Kyiv (loan)	7	(1)
2014–2017	Vorskla Poltava	69	(3)
2018	Akzhayik	31	(1)
2019	Atyrau	17	(0)
2019	Chornomorets Odesa	17	(1)
2020–2021	Mynai	32	(1)
2021–2023	Karpaty Lviv	28	(2)
2023–2024	Metalist 1925 Kharkiv	23	(0)
2024	→ Dinaz Vyshhorod (loan)	8	(1)
2024–2025	Feniks Pidmonastyr	19	(4)
2025	Hirnyk Novoyavorivsk	9	(3)
2025–	Feniks-Mariupol	2	(0)
- * Club domestic league appearances and goals as of 27 December 2025

Andriy Mykolayovych Tkachuk (Ukrainian: Андрій Миколайович Ткачук; born 18 November 1987) is a Ukrainian professional footballer who plays as a midfielder for Feniks-Mariupol.
