= Vadym Sapay =

Ukrainian footballer

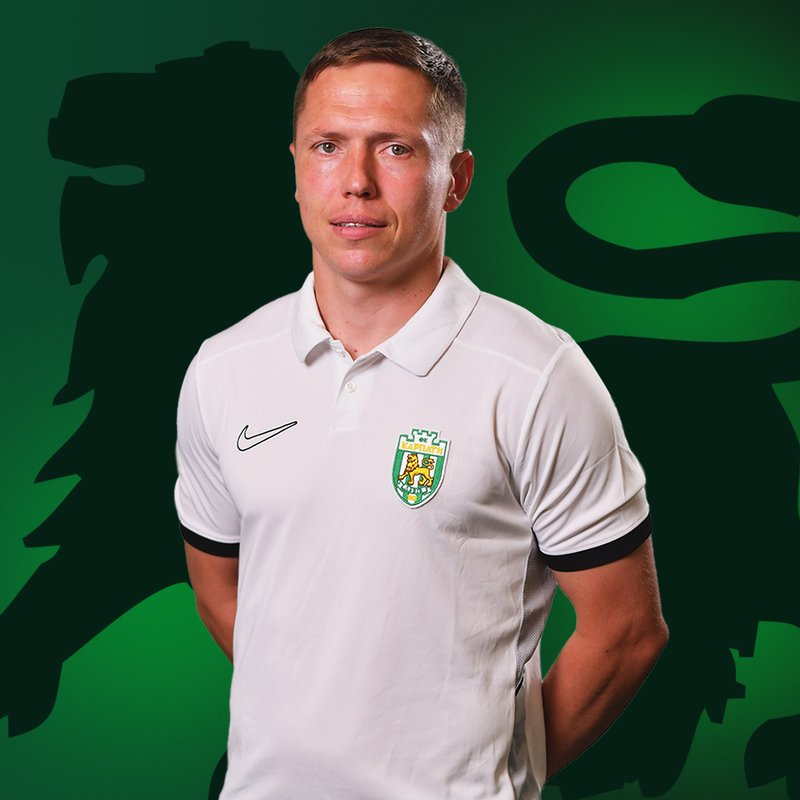
- Vadym Sapay in 2025

Personal information
- Full name: Vadym Viktorovych Sapay
- Date of birth: 7 February 1986 (age 40)
- Place of birth: Yuzhnoukrainsk, Ukrainian SSR
- Height: 1.78 m (5 ft 10 in)
- Position: Left back

Youth career
- 1999–2000: Torpedo Mykolaiv
- 2000–2003: Knyazha Shchaslyve

Senior career*
| Years | Team | Apps | (Gls) |
| 2003–2005 | Borysfen Boryspil | 14 | (2) |
| 2003 | → Borysfen-2 Boryspil | 10 | (1) |
| 2004 | → Boreks-Borysfen Borodianka | 12 | (1) |
| 2006–2008 | Metalurh Donetsk | 9 | (0) |
| 2009–2010 | Stal Alchevsk | 22 | (1) |
| 2010–2012 | Obolon Kyiv | 50 | (0) |
| 2012–2021 | Vorskla Poltava | 157 | (3) |
| Total | | 274 | (8) |
- * Club domestic league appearances and goals

Vadym Viktorovych Sapay (Ukrainian: Вадим Вікторович Сапай; born 7 February 1986) is a Ukrainian retired professional footballer who played as a left back.

== Career ==
He joined Vorskla Poltava in the summer transfer season of 2012 from Obolon Kyiv.
