= Oleh Barannik =

Ukrainian footballer (born 1992)

Oleg Barannik
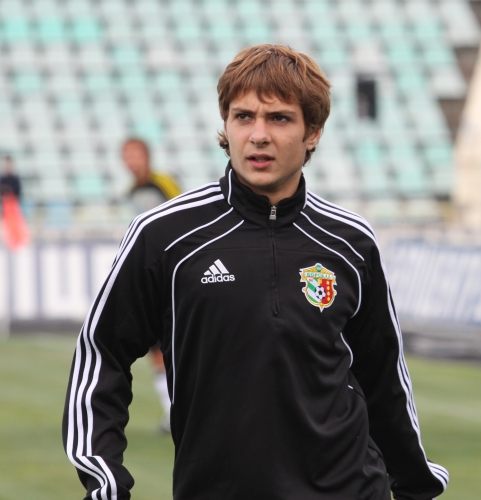

Personal information
- Full name: Oleg Vasylyovych Barannik
- Date of birth: 20 March 1992 (age 34)
- Place of birth: Semenivka, Ukraine
- Height: 1.78 m (5 ft 10 in)
- Position: Striker

Youth career
- 2003–2008: FC Molod' Poltava
- 2008–2009: Dynamo Kyiv

Senior career*
Years	Team	Apps	(Gls)
2010–2017	Vorskla Poltava	57	(5)
2016	→ Hirnyk-Sport Horishni Plavni (loan)	7	(0)
2017	Poltava	11	(2)
2018	Naftovyk-Ukrnafta Okhtyrka	9	(1)
2018	Avanhard Kramatorsk	8	(2)
2020	Kremin Kremenchuk	0	(0)

International career^{‡}
2012	Ukraine-20	1	(0)
- * Club domestic league appearances and goals as of 24 June 2020 ‡ National team caps and goals as of 1 August 2018

Oleg Vasylyovych Barannik (Ukrainian: Олег Васильович Бараннік; born 20 March 1992) is a Ukrainian professional football striker.

== International career ==
He was called up to Ukraine national under-21 football team for the Euro 2013 qualification game against Slovenia on 6 September 2011, but not spent any game for this team.
