= 2021 FC Dinamo Tbilisi season =

FC Dinamo Tbilisi
2021 season
- Chairman: Roman Pipia
- Manager: Georgi Nemsadze (until 18 June); Kakhaber Tskhadadze (from 19 June)
- Stadium: Boris Paichadze Dinamo Arena
- Erovnuli Liga: 2nd
- Georgian Cup: Third Round vs Shukura Kobuleti
- Super Cup: Winners
- UEFA Champions League: First qualifying round vs Neftçi
- UEFA Europa Conference League: Second qualifying round vs Maccabi Haifa
- Top goalscorer: League: Zoran Marušić (16); All: Zoran Marušić (18)

The 2021 FC Dinamo Tbilisi season was the thirty-third successive season that FC Dinamo Tbilisi played in the top flight of Georgian football.

== Season events ==
On 25 February, Dinamo announced the signing of Sekou Keita from Al-Arabi, to a one-year contract.

On 29 April, Dinamo Tbilisi announced the signing of free-agent Jano Ananidze to a one-year contract, with the option of an additional year.

On 9 May, Carlos Castro left Dinamo after his contract was terminated by mutual agreement.

On 24 May, Tornike Morchiladze extended his contract with Dinamo Tbilisi for three years.

On 2 June, Giorgi Mamardashvili joined Valencia on a one-year loan deal, with Valencia holding a buy-out option.

On 22 June, Dinamo announced the return of Nodar Kavtaradze from Mezőkövesdi, on a contract until the end of 2023.

On 4 July, Víctor Mongil and Filip Oršula both left Dinamo after their contracts were ended by mutual termination.

On 5 July, Dinamo announced the signing of Barnes Osei to an eighteen-month contract, and the departure of Luka Gagnidze to Dynamo Moscow.

On 30 July, Sekou Keita left Dinamo after his contract was terminated by mutual agreement.

On 3 December, Dinamo Tbilisi announced the departure of Jano Ananidze after playing only 26 minutes for the club.

On 31 December, Valencia triggered the buy-out option on their loan deal with Giorgi Mamardashvili.

== Squad ==
As of match played 4 December 2021

No.	Name	Nationality	Position	Date of birth (age)	Signed from	Signed in	Contract ends	Apps.	Goals
Goalkeepers
1	Andrés Prieto	(Spain)	GK	17 October 1993 (aged 28)	Birmingham City	2021	2023	14	0
13	Omar Migineishvili	(Georgia (country))	GK	2 June 1984 (aged 37)	Saburtalo	2020		26	0
30	Luka Kutaladze	(Georgia (country))	GK	27 April 2001 (aged 20)	Academy	2021		3	0
36	Papuna Beruashvili	(Georgia (country))	GK	21 March 2004 (aged 17)	Academy	2021		0	0
Defenders
2	Giorgi Maisuradze	(Georgia (country))	DF	31 January 2002 (aged 19)	Academy	2021		1	0
3	Aleksandre Kalandadze	(Georgia (country))	DF	9 May 2001 (aged 20)	Academy	2020		7	0
4	Zurab Eradze	(Georgia (country))	DF	17 April 2002 (aged 19)	Academy	2021		0	0
5	Davit Kobouri	(Georgia (country))	DF	24 January 1998 (aged 23)	Academy	2015		143	2
12	Levan Kharabadze	(Georgia (country))	DF	26 January 2000 (aged 21)	Academy	2018		70	6
16	Giorgi Kimadze	(Georgia (country))	DF	11 February 1992 (aged 29)	Torpedo Kutaisi	2019		34	0
17	Irakli Iakobidze	(Georgia (country))	DF	25 January 2002 (aged 19)	Academy	2021		0	0
19	Simon Gbegnon	(Togo)	DF	27 October 1992 (aged 29)	Mirandés	2020		49	4
22	Fabian Sporkslede	(Netherlands)	DF	3 August 1993 (aged 28)	RKC Waalwijk	2021		35	2
24	Nodar Iashvili	(Georgia (country))	DF	24 January 1993 (aged 28)	Saburtalo	2019		68	1
31	Giorgi Chkhetiani	(Georgia (country))	DF	20 February 2003 (aged 18)	Academy	2021		1	0
33	Luka Salukvadze	(Georgia (country))	DF	28 January 2003 (aged 18)	Academy	2021		0	0
35	Tornike Jangidze	(Georgia (country))	DF	8 January 2001 (aged 20)	Academy	2020		0	0
39	Saba Khvadagiani	(Georgia (country))	DF	30 January 2001 (aged 20)	Academy	2021		33	1
Midfielders
6	Bakar Kardava	(Georgia (country))	MF	4 October 1994 (aged 27)	Tskhinvali	2017		132	5
7	Jano Ananidze	(Georgia (country))	MF	10 October 1992 (aged 29)	Unattached	2021		1	0
8	Milan Radin	(Serbia)	MF	25 June 1991 (aged 30)	Inđija	2021		37	5
15	Giorgi Papava	(Georgia (country))	MF	16 February 1993 (aged 28)	Rustavi	2019		167	5
21	Giorgi Kutsia	(Georgia (country))	MF	27 October 1999 (aged 22)	Academy	2017		104	6
23	Giorgi Moistsrapishvili	(Georgia (country))	MF	29 September 2001 (aged 20)	Academy	2019		13	2
25	Tornike Morchiladze	(Georgia (country))	MF	10 January 2002 (aged 19)	Academy	2021	2024	28	1
27	Anzor Mekvabishvili	(Georgia (country))	MF	5 June 2001 (aged 20)	Academy	2020		113	8
29	Nodar Lominadze	(Georgia (country))	MF	4 April 2002 (aged 19)	Academy	2021		1	0
31	Lasha Atskureli	(Georgia (country))	MF	11 April 2001 (aged 20)	Academy	2020		1	0
34	Dito Pachulia	(Georgia (country))	MF	5 July 2002 (aged 19)	Gagra	2021		1	0
38	Nodar Kavtaradze	(Russia)	MF	2 January 1993 (aged 28)	Torpedo Kutaisi	2019		52	15
Forwards
9	Giorgi Gabedava	(Georgia (country))	FW	3 October 1989 (aged 32)	Saburtalo Tbilisi	2020		43	16
11	Davit Skhirtladze	(Georgia (country))	FW	16 March 1993 (aged 28)	Viborg	2021		11	5
14	Jaduli Iobashvili	(Georgia (country))	FW	1 January 2004 (aged 17)	Academy	2021		1	0
18	Barnes Osei	(Ghana)	FW	8 January 1995 (aged 26)	Nea Salamis Famagusta	2021		19	6
26	Nika Kokosadze	(Georgia (country))	FW	30 July 2001 (aged 20)	Aragvi Dusheti	2021		1	0
28	Giorgi Omarashvili	(Georgia (country))	FW	10 February 2002 (aged 19)	Academy	2021		1	0
32	Zoran Marušić	(Serbia)	FW	29 November 1993 (aged 28)	Neman Grodno	2021		42	18
Players away on loan
17	Tornike Akhvlediani	(Georgia (country))	FW	24 July 1999 (aged 22)	Zestaponi	2020		25	4
Left during the season
3	Víctor Mongil	(Spain)	DF	21 July 1992 (aged 29)	ATK	2020	2021	69	1
7	Levan Tsotsonava	(Georgia (country))	MF	12 February 1997 (aged 24)	Merani Martvili	2021		1	0
14	Davit Zurabiani	(Georgia (country))	FW	22 February 2002 (aged 19)	Academy	2021		1	0
18	Filip Oršula	(Slovakia)	MF	25 February 1993 (aged 28)	Spartak Trnava	2020		10	0
20	Sekou Keita	(Guinea)	MF	12 December 1994 (aged 26)	Al-Arabi	2021		6	0
28	Carlos Castro	(Spain)	FW	1 June 1995 (aged 26)	RCD Mallorca	2020	2022	5	0
30	Roin Kvaskhvadze	(Georgia (country))	GK	31 May 1989 (aged 32)	Torpedo Kutaisi	2020		47	0
30	Luka Kharshiladze	(Georgia (country))	GK	18 February 2002 (aged 19)	Academy	2021		2	0
34	Luka Gagnidze	(Georgia (country))	MF	28 February 2003 (aged 18)	Academy	2020		18	1
38	Giorgi Abuashvili	(Georgia (country))	MF	8 February 2003 (aged 18)	Academy	2019		6	0
	Mikheil Ergemlidze	(Georgia (country))	FW	28 September 1999 (aged 22)	Academy	2017		29	1

== Transfers ==
=== In ===
Date	Position	Nationality	Name	From	Fee	Ref.
25 February 2021	MF	(Guinea)	Sekou Keita	Al-Arabi	Undisclosed	
29 April 2021	MF	(Georgia (country))	Jano Ananidze	Unattached	Free	
22 June 2021	MF	(Russia)	Nodar Kavtaradze	Mezőkövesdi	Undisclosed	
5 July 2021	FW	(Ghana)	Barnes Osei	Nea Salamis Famagusta	Undisclosed	

=== Out ===
Date	Position	Nationality	Name	To	Fee	Ref.
5 July 2021	MF	(Georgia (country))	Luka Gagnidze	Dynamo Moscow	Undisclosed	
4 August 2021	FW	(Georgia (country))	Mikheil Ergemlidze	Sabah	Undisclosed	
31 December 2021	GK	(Georgia (country))	Giorgi Mamardashvili	Valencia	Undisclosed	

=== Loans out ===
Date from	Position	Nationality	Name	To	Date to	Ref.
July 2020	DF	(Georgia (country))	Aleksandre Kalandadze	Diósgyőri	2 July 2021	
July 2020	FW	(Georgia (country))	Giorgi Omarashvili	Diósgyőri	2 July 2021	
17 January 2021	FW	(Georgia (country))	Mikheil Ergemlidze	Adana Demirspor	30 June 2021	
2 June 2021	GK	(Georgia (country))	Giorgi Mamardashvili	Valencia	31 December 2021	

=== Released ===
Date	Position	Nationality	Name	Joined	Date	Ref.
9 May 2021	FW	(Spain)	Carlos Castro	Racing de Santander	8 June 2021	
4 July 2021	DF	(Spain)	Víctor Mongil	Odisha	26 July 2021	
4 July 2021	MF	(Slovakia)	Filip Oršula	Senica		
30 July 2021	MF	(Guinea)	Sekou Keita	Voždovac		
3 December 2021	MF	(Georgia (country))	Jano Ananidze	Dinamo Batumi		

== Friendlies ==
2021	v
GET (UTC+4)

== Competitions ==
=== Overview ===
Competition	First match	Last match	Starting round	Final position	Record							
Competition	First match	Last match	Starting round	Final position	Pld	W	D	L	GF	GA	GD	Win %
Erovnuli Liga	27 February 2021	4 December 2021	Matchday 1	2nd	36	21	7	8	59	28	+31	58.33
Georgian Cup	21 September 2021	21 September 2021	Third round	Third Round	1	0	0	1	0	1	−1	0.00
Super Cup	21 February 2021	21 February 2021	Final	Winners	1	0	1	0	2	2	+0	0.00
UEFA Champions League	7 July 2021	14 July 2021	First qualifying round	First qualifying round	2	0	0	2	2	4	−2	0.00
UEFA Europa Conference League	22 July 2021	29 July 2021	First qualifying round	Second qualifying round	2	0	0	2	2	7	−5	0.00
Total					42	21	8	13	65	42	+23	50.00

Last updated: 4 December 2021
Source: Competitions

=== Super Cup ===
21 February 2021	Dinamo Tbilisi	2 – 2 (5 – 4 p)	Gagra	Tbilisi
18:00 GET (UTC+4)	Marušić 47'; Gabedava 67'; Kutsia (yellow card) 90'	Report	Kobuladze 13'; Chaduneli (yellow card) 49'; Nozadze 72'	Stadium: Mikheil Meskhi Stadium; Attendance: 0 Referee: Irakli Serkadze
	Penalties
	Sporkslede (penalty scored); Kutsia (penalty scored); Mongil (penalty scored); Kvaskhvadze (penalty scored); Gabedava (penalty scored)		(penalty scored) Khositashvili; (penalty scored) Kakiashvili; (penalty scored) Chaduneli; (penalty missed) Markozashvili; (penalty scored) Makatsaria

=== Erovnuli Liga ===
==== Results summary ====
Overall								Home						Away					
Pld	W	D	L	GF	GA	GD	Pts	W	D	L	GF	GA	GD	W	D	L	GF	GA	GD
36	21	7	8	59	28	+31	70	12	3	3	32	15	+17	9	4	5	27	13	+14

Last updated: 4 December 2021.
Source: See Results

==== Results by round ====
Round	1	2	3	4	5	6	7	8	9	10	11	12	13	14	15	16	17	18	19	20	21	22	23	24	25	26	27	28	29	30	31	32	33	34	35	36
Ground	H	A	H	H	A	H	A	H	A	A	H	A	A	H	A	H	A	H	H	A	H	H	A	H	A	H	A	A	H	A	A	H	A	H	A	H
Result	D	W	L	W	W	W	W	W	W	L	W	L	W	W	L	D	W	W	L	W	L	W	L	D	W	W	D	D	W	D	W	W	L	W	D	W
Position	5	2	4	3	3	1	1	1	1	1	1	2	2	2	2	2	2	2	2	1	2	2	2	2	2	2	2	2	2	2	2	2	2	2	2	2

Source: See Results
A = Away; H = Home; W = Win; D = Draw; L = Loss

==== Results ====
27 February 2021 1	Dinamo Tbilisi	1–1	Samgurali Tsqaltubo	Tbilisi
18:00 GET (UTC+4)	Gabedava 71'; Sporkslede (yellow card) 83'; Gagnidze (yellow card) 87'	Report	Kukhianidze 30'; Kurdadze (yellow card) 39'	Stadium: Boris Paichadze Dinamo Arena; Referee: Badri Ninua

5 March 2021 2	Torpedo Kutaisi	0–2	Dinamo Tbilisi	Kutaisi
20:00 GET (UTC+4)	Hamzić (red card) 15'; Zidan (yellow card) 90+1'; Boukassi (yellow card) 90+4'	Report	Akhvlediani 48'; Gbegnon 70'	Stadium: Ramaz Shengelia Stadium; Referee: Arsen Nonikashvili

9 March 2021 3	Dinamo Tbilisi	0–1	Dinamo Batumi	Tbilisi
19:00 GET (UTC+4)	Sporkslede (yellow card) 24'; Radin (yellow card) 45'	Report	Mandzhgaladze (yellow card) 15' (goal) 66'	Stadium: Boris Paichadze Dinamo Arena; Referee: Irakli Kvirikashvili

14 March 2021 4	Dinamo Tbilisi	4–3	Saburtalo	Tbilisi
20:00 GET (UTC+4)	Marušić 5', 31'; Mekvabishvili (yellow card) 18'; Kobouri (yellow card) 49'; Gabedava 55' (pen.); Papava 69' (yellow card) 89'; Mongil (yellow card) 74'	Report	Nonikashvili 16', 45+3'; Mandrîcenco (yellow card) 52'; Tabatadze 71'; Mali (yellow card) 85'	Stadium: Boris Paichadze Dinamo Arena; Referee: Goga Kikacheishvili

20 March 2024 5	Telavi	0–3	Dinamo Tbilisi	Telavi
18:00 GET (UTC+4)	Janelidze (yellow card) 38'; Kapanadze (yellow card) 43'; Gabiskiria (yellow card) 87'	Report	Khvadagiani (yellow card) 22'; Radin (yellow card) 62' (goal) 72'; Marušić 63'; Sporkslede 69'	Stadium: Caucasus Arena; Referee: Irakli Kherkhadze

3 April 2021 6	Dinamo Tbilisi	1–0	Dila Gori	Tbilisi
17:30 GET (UTC+4)	Mekvabishvili (yellow card) 3'; Gagnidze 13'; Papava (yellow card) 41'	Report		Stadium: Boris Paichadze Dinamo Arena; Referee: Giorgi Kruashvili

7 April 2021 7	Shukura Kobuleti	0–2	Dinamo Tbilisi	Zestaponi
16:00 GET (UTC+4)	Museliani (yellow card) 21'; Rekhviashvili (yellow card) 64'; Kakashvili (yellow card) 80'	Report	Gagnidze (yellow card) 59'; Gabedava 65' (pen.); Moistsrapishvili (yellow card) 80'; Akhvlediani 84'	Stadium: David Abashidze Stadium; Referee: Irakli Kherkhadze

11 April 2021 8	Dinamo Tbilisi	2–1	Samtredia	Tbilisi
14:00 GET (UTC+4)	Giorgi Gabedava 20'; Kardava 22'	Report	Kobakhidze (yellow card) 24' (goal) 26'	Stadium: Boris Paichadze Dinamo Arena; Referee: Aleko Aptsiauri

16 April 2021 9	Locomotive Tbilisi	1–3	Dinamo Tbilisi	Tbilisi
16:00 GET (UTC+4)	Kashia 85'; Mchedlishvili (yellow card) 87'	Report	Radin (yellow card) 47'; Mekvabishvili 74'; Marušić 80', 82'; Khvadagiani (yellow card) 84'; Iashvili (yellow card) 88'	Stadium: Boris Paichadze Dinamo Arena; Referee: Koray Gençerler

25 April 2024 10	Samgurali Tsqaltubo	2–0	Dinamo Tbilisi	Tsqaltubo
16:00 GET (UTC+4)	Mchedlishvili (yellow card) 33'; Kukhianidze 44' (yellow card) 78'; Kirkitadze (yellow card) 68'; Lekvtadze (yellow card) 81'; Bukhaidze (yellow card) 88' (yellow-red card) 90+5' (goal) 90+5'	Report	Kutsia (yellow card) 35'; Mekvabishvili (yellow card) 70'	Stadium: 26 May Stadium; Referee: Kote Giorgadze

29 April 2021 11	Dinamo Tbilisi	1–0	Torpedo Kutaisi	Tbilisi
18:00 GET (UTC+4)	Morchiladze 65' (yellow card) 90+4'; Mongil (yellow card) 90+1'	Report	Sallaku (yellow card) 86'	Stadium: Boris Paichadze Dinamo Arena; Referee: Aleko Aptsiauri

8 May 2021 12	Dinamo Batumi	1–0	Dinamo Tbilisi	Batumi
20:15 GET (UTC+4)	Jighauri 42' (yellow card) 88'; Altunashvili (yellow card) 71'; Teidi (yellow card) 90+5'	Report	Kutsia (yellow card) 81'; Radin (yellow card) 85'; Keita (yellow card) 89'	Stadium: Adjarabet Arena; Referee: Irakli Kvirikashvili

12 May 2021 13	Saburtalo	0–4	Dinamo Tbilisi	Tbilisi
18:00 GET (UTC+4)	Tabatadze (yellow card) 37'; Mudrac (yellow card) 44'; Mali (yellow card) 44'; Kokhreidze (yellow card) 45'	Report	Marušić 12', 45' (pen.); Akhvlediani 18' (yellow card) 56'; Gabedava 90+2'	Stadium: Mikheil Meskhi Stadium; Referee: Jener Khorava

16 May 2021 14	Dinamo Tbilisi	1–0	Telavi	Tbilisi
18:00 GET (UTC+4)	Khvadagiani 64'	Report	Jikia (yellow card) 30'; Patsatsia (yellow card) 75'; Ardazishvili (yellow card) 90+5'	Stadium: Boris Paichadze Dinamo Arena; Referee: Badri Ninua

23 May 2021 15	Dila Gori	2–0	Dinamo Tbilisi	Gori
20:30 GET (UTC+4)	Camara (yellow card) 18'; Nondi (yellow card) 47'; Mosiashvili (yellow card) 63'; Gudushauri 69'; Bidzinashvili 74'	Report	Marušić (yellow card) 63'; Gabedava (yellow card) 83'	Stadium: Tengiz Burjanadze Stadium; Referee: Goga Kikacheishvili

9 June 2021 16	Dinamo Tbilisi	1–1	Shukura Kobuleti	Tbilisi
18:45 GET (UTC+4)	Marušić 64'; Sporkslede (yellow card) 74'	Report	Jefinho (yellow card) 19' (goal) 83' (pen.); Museliani (yellow card) 32'; Verulidze (yellow card) 90+2'	Stadium: Boris Paichadze Dinamo Arena; Referee: Jener Khorava

13 June 2021 17	Samtredia	0–2	Dinamo Tbilisi	Samtredia
17:30 GET (UTC+4)	Giorgadze (yellow card) 55'	Report	Radin 24'; Akhvlediani 80'	Stadium: Erosi Manjgaladze Stadium; Referee: Giorgi Kruashvili

19 June 2021 18	Dinamo Tbilisi	2–0	Locomotive Tbilisi	Tbilisi
20:30 GET (UTC+4)	Gabedava 17', 65' (pen.)	Report	Gabadze (yellow card) 38'; Kirkitadze (yellow card) 63'; Kakhabrishvili (yellow card) 90+5'	Stadium: Boris Paichadze Dinamo Arena; Referee: Irakli Kvirikashvili

23 June 2021 19	Dinamo Tbilisi	1–2	Samgurali Tsqaltubo	Tbilisi
19:30 GET (UTC+4)	Gabedava 60' (pen.)	Report	Lekvtadze 1'; Poniava 17'; Gilmore (yellow card) 59' (yellow-red card) 67'; Bandzeladze (yellow card) 90'	Stadium: Boris Paichadze Dinamo Arena; Referee: Aleko Aptsiauri

27 June 2021 20	Torpedo Kutaisi	0–1	Dinamo Tbilisi	Kutaisi
20:30 GET (UTC+4)	Nadaraia (yellow card) 52'; Tabatadze (yellow card) 56'; Boukassi (yellow card) 68'	Report	Kutsia 25' (yellow card) 65'; Radin (yellow card) 51'; Marušić (yellow card) 52'	Stadium: Ramaz Shengelia Stadium; Referee: Arsen Nonikashvili

1 July 2021 21	Dinamo Tbilisi	1–2	Dinamo Batumi	Tbilisi
20:30 GET (UTC+4)	Marušić 17'; Gabedava (yellow card) 21'; Kutsia (yellow card) 39'	Report	Altunashvili (yellow card) 25'; Azarovi 78'; Flamarion 90' (yellow card) 90'	Stadium: Boris Paichadze Dinamo Arena; Referee: Irakli Kvirikashvili

8 August 2021 22	Dinamo Tbilisi	2–1	Saburtalo	Tbilisi
19:00 GET (UTC+4)	Papava (yellow card) 8'; Mandrîcenco 14' (o.g.); Barnes 51'; Radin (yellow card) 55'; Sporkslede (yellow card) 85'	Report	Tsnobiladze 41'; Mali (yellow card) 69'	Stadium: Boris Paichadze Dinamo Arena; Referee: Arsen Nonikashvili

12 September 2024 23	Telavi	1–0	Dinamo Tbilisi	Telavi
19:00 GET (UTC+4)	Marakvelidze (yellow card) 13'; Jikia (yellow card) 40'; Janelidze (yellow card) 45+2'; Shergelashvili 49'; Shekiladze (yellow card) 77'; Rukhadze (yellow card) 83'; Patsatsia (yellow card) 90'	Report	Radin (yellow card) 31'; Kutsia (yellow card) 70'	Stadium: Caucasus Arena; Referee: Goga Kikacheishvili

16 September 2021 24	Dinamo Tbilisi	0–0	Dila Gori	Tbilisi
21:00 GET (UTC+4)	Morchiladze (yellow card) 49'	Report	Chichinadze (yellow card) 80'; Kapanadze (yellow card) 86'; Kougbenya (yellow card) 90+4'	Stadium: Boris Paichadze Dinamo Arena; Referee: Davit Kharitonashvili

20 September 2021 25	Shukura Kobuleti	0–4	Dinamo Tbilisi	Poti
16:00 GET (UTC+4)	Kvaratskhelia (yellow card) 82'	Report	Marušić 27', 64'; Barnes 44'; Kharabadze 83'	Stadium: Fazisi Stadium; Referee: Irakli Kherkhadze

24 September 2021 26	Dinamo Tbilisi	5–1	Samtredia	Tbilisi
21:00 GET (UTC+4)	Marušić 17'; Khvadagiani (yellow card) 41'; Barnes (yellow card) 55'; Skhirtladze 57'; Gbegnon 59'; Radin 72'; Moistsrapishvili 80'	Report	Mchedlishvili (yellow card) 12' (yellow-red card) 47'; Arabidze 22'	Stadium: Boris Paichadze Dinamo Arena; Referee: Irakli Kherkhadze

29 September 2021 27	Locomotive Tbilisi	2–2	Dinamo Tbilisi	Tbilisi
18:30 GET (UTC+4)	Samurkasovi (yellow card) 54'; Sikharulidze 69'; Sandokhadze 78'; Diasamidze (yellow card) 82'	Report	Morchiladze (yellow card) 39'; Marušić 65'; Barnes 80'	Stadium: Mikheil Meskhi Stadium; Referee: Goga Kikacheishvili

3 October 2024 28	Samgurali Tsqaltubo	2–2	Dinamo Tbilisi	Tsqaltubo
15:30 GET (UTC+4)	Kukhianidze 2' (pen.); Kalandarishvili 73'; Kikabidze (yellow card) 90'	Report	Prieto (yellow card) 1'; Skhirtladze 12'; Barnes 29'; Radin (yellow card) 66'	Stadium: 26 May Stadium; Referee: Davit Kharitonashvili

16 October 2021 29	Dinamo Tbilisi	1–0	Torpedo Kutaisi	Tbilisi
20:30 GET (UTC+4)	Sporkslede 7'; Kharabadze (yellow card) 90+3'; Papava (yellow card) 90+6'	Report	Boukassi (yellow card) 37'; Mudimu (yellow card) 83'	Stadium: Boris Paichadze Dinamo Arena; Referee: Giorgi Kruashvili

20 October 2021 30	Dinamo Batumi	1–1	Dinamo Tbilisi	Batumi
18:30 GET (UTC+4)	Mamuchashvili (yellow card) 31'; Jighauri 38'; Flamarion (yellow card) 43'; Pantsulaia (yellow card) 65'; Chabradze (yellow card) 75'; Teidi (yellow card) 76'	Report	Barnes 18'; Khvadagiani (yellow card) 48'; Kutsia (yellow card) 56'; Kharabadze (yellow card) 90+3'	Stadium: Adjarabet Arena; Referee: Irakli Kvirikashvili

24 October 2021 31	Saburtalo	0–1	Dinamo Tbilisi	Tbilisi
20:30 GET (UTC+4)	Nonikashvili (yellow card) 42'; Shulaya (yellow card) 81'	Report	Kavtaradze 30'; Radin (yellow card) 38'; Kalandadze (yellow card) 73'	Stadium: Mikheil Meskhi Stadium; Referee: Marcel Bârsan (Romania)

31 October 2021 32	Dinamo Tbilisi	4–0	Telavi	Tbilisi
20:00 GET (UTC+4)	Radin 41'; Kharabadze 72'; Marušić 90'; Moistsrapishvili 90+2'	Report	Patsatsia (yellow card) 54'; Tolordava (yellow card) 90'	Stadium: Boris Paichadze Dinamo Arena; Referee: Irakli Kvirikashvili

6 November 2021 33	Dila Gori	1–0	Dinamo Tbilisi	Gori
20:00 GET (UTC+4)	Santos (yellow card) 14'; Bidzinashvili 47'	Report	Kavtaradze (yellow card) 29'	Stadium: Tengiz Burjanadze Stadium; Referee: Badri Ninua

20 November 2021 34	Dinamo Tbilisi	2–0	Shukura Kobuleti	Tbilisi
18:00 GET (UTC+4)	Gabedava 15'; Marušić 31'; Barnes (yellow card) 80'; Sporkslede (yellow card) 90+3'	Report	Khmaladze (yellow card) 64'; Jefinho (penalty missed) 75'; Spychka (yellow card) 77'	Stadium: Boris Paichadze Dinamo Arena; Referee: Goga Kikacheishvili

28 November 2021 35	Samtredia	0–0	Dinamo Tbilisi	Samtredia
13:30 GET (UTC+4)	Mchedlishvili (yellow card) 58'	Report	Khvadagiani (yellow card) 60'	Stadium: Erosi Manjgaladze Stadium; Referee: Jener Khorava

4 December 2021 36	Dinamo Tbilisi	3–2	Locomotive Tbilisi	Tbilisi
18:30 GET (UTC+4)	Gbegnon 11' (yellow card) 74'; Gabedava 19' (pen.); Marušić 81'	Report	Kopaliani (yellow card) 19'; Mukbaniani (yellow card) 38'; Wade 44', 90+5'	Stadium: Boris Paichadze Dinamo Arena; Referee: Khatuna Maisuradze

==== League table ====
Pos	Team	Pld	W	D	L	GF	GA	GD	Pts	Qualification or relegation
1	Dinamo Batumi (C)	36	21	12	3	73	27	+46	75	Qualification for Champions League first qualifying round
2	Dinamo Tbilisi	36	21	7	8	59	28	+31	70	Qualification for Europa Conference League first qualifying round
3	Dila Gori	36	17	10	9	48	35	+13	61	Qualification for Europa Conference League first qualifying round
4	Saburtalo Tbilisi (Note: «Saburtalo Tbilisi qualified for the Europa Conference League first qualifying round as 2021 Georgian Cup winner)	36	15	12	9	52	40	+12	57	Qualification for Europa Conference League first qualifying round
5	Locomotive Tbilisi	36	15	8	13	57	59	−2	53	

Source: Erovnuli Liga, Soccerway
Rules for classification: 1) Points; 2) Head-to-head points; 3) Head-to-head goal difference; 4) Head-to-head goals scored; 5) Head-to-head away goals scored (only if two teams); 6) Goal difference; 7) Goals scored.
(C) Champions

=== Georgian Cup ===
21 April 2021 Third Round	Shukura Kobuleti	1 – 0	Dinamo Tbilisi	Zestaponi
13:00 GET (UTC+4)	Rekhviashvili (yellow card) 37'; Ekvtimishvili 54'; Chelebadze (penalty missed) 74' (yellow card) 75'; Verulidze (yellow card) 90+3'	Report	Radin (yellow card) 56'; Mekvabishvili (yellow card) 73'	Stadium: David Abashidze Stadium; Referee: G.Kruashvili

=== UEFA Champions League ===
==== Qualifying rounds ====
7 July 2021 First qualifying round 1st leg	Dinamo Tbilisi (Georgia (country))	1 – 2	(Azerbaijan) Neftçi	Tbilisi, Georgia
20:00 GET (UTC+4)	Marušić 36'; Kardava (yellow card) 84'	Report	Alaskarov 23'; Mahmudov 57' (pen.); Lawal (yellow card) 77'	Stadium: Boris Paichadze Dinamo Arena; Attendance: 5,890; Referee: David Fuxman (Israel)

14 July 2021 First qualifying round 2nd leg	Neftçi (Azerbaijan)	2 – 1 (4 – 2 agg.)	(Georgia (country)) Dinamo Tbilisi	Baku, Azerbaijan
21:00 GET (UTC+4)	Meza (yellow card) 22'; Mbodj (yellow card) 55'; Mahmudov 58' (pen.); Lawal (yellow card) 64'; Alaskarov 68'; Buludov (yellow card) 81'	Report	Radin (yellow card) 45+1' (goal) 51'; Gabedava (yellow card) 52'; Kutsia (yellow card) 65'; Gbegnon (yellow card) 71'; Morchiladze (yellow card) 83'; Iashvili (yellow card) 90+1'	Stadium: Eighth Kilometer District Stadium; Attendance: 3,218; Referee: Dumitri Muntean (Moldova)

=== UEFA Europa Conference League ===
==== Qualifying rounds ====
22 July 2021 First qualifying round 1st leg	Dinamo Tbilisi (Georgia (country))	1 – 2	(Israel) Maccabi Haifa	Tbilisi, Georgia
20:30 GET (UTC+4)	Kutsia (yellow card) 50'; Sporkslede (yellow card) 78'; Papava 89'; Osei (yellow card) 90+6'	Report	Atzili 8'; Abu Fani (yellow card) 12'; Planić (yellow card) 33'; Rodríguez (yellow card) 62'; David 66'; Menahem (yellow card) 80'	Stadium: Boris Paichadze Dinamo Arena; Attendance: 4,234; Referee: Lukas Fähndrich (Switzerland)

29 July 2021 First qualifying round 2nd leg	Maccabi Haifa (Israel)	5 – 1 (7 – 2 agg.)	(Georgia (country)) Dinamo Tbilisi	Haifa, Israel
21:00 GET (UTC+4)	M.Levi 17' (yellow card) 48'; Sporkslede 37' (o.g.); Meir (yellow card) 40'; Rodríguez (yellow card) 47'; Atzili 75'; Ashkenazi 81', 85'	Report	Papava (yellow card) 21'; Barnes 24'; Kavtaradze (yellow card) 30'; Iashvili (yellow card) 80'; Kutsia (yellow card) 87'	Stadium: Sammy Ofer Stadium; Attendance: 13,100; Referee: Amine Kourgheli (Belarus)

== Squad statistics ==
As of match played 4 December 2021

=== Appearances and goals ===
No.	Pos	Nat	Player	Total		Erovnuli Liga		Georgian Cup		Super Cup		UEFA Champions League		UEFA Europa Conference League	
No.	Pos	Nat	Player	Apps	Goals	Apps	Goals	Apps	Goals	Apps	Goals	Apps	Goals	Apps	Goals
1	GK	(Spain) ESP	Andrés Prieto	14	0	14	0	0	0	0	0	0	0	0	0
3	DF	(Georgia (country)) GEO	Aleksandre Kalandadze	7	0	5+2	0	0	0	0	0	0	0	0	0
5	DF	(Georgia (country)) GEO	Davit Kobouri	25	0	17+5	0	1	0	1	0	0	0	0+1	0
6	MF	(Georgia (country)) GEO	Bakar Kardava	36	1	13+17	1	1	0	1	0	2	0	1+1	0
7	MF	(Georgia (country)) GEO	Jano Ananidze	1	0	0+1	0	0	0	0	0	0	0	0	0
8	MF	(Serbia) SRB	Milan Radin	37	5	24+7	4	0+1	0	1	0	2	1	2	0
9	FW	(Georgia (country)) GEO	Giorgi Gabedava	31	11	21+5	10	0	0	1	1	2	0	1+1	0
11	FW	(Georgia (country)) GEO	Davit Skhirtladze	6	2	4+2	2	0	0	0	0	0	0	0	0
12	DF	(Georgia (country)) GEO	Levan Kharabadze	33	2	23+5	2	1	0	0	0	2	0	2	0
13	GK	(Georgia (country)) GEO	Omar Migineishvili	5	0	3	0	0	0	0	0	0	0	2	0
15	MF	(Georgia (country)) GEO	Giorgi Papava	41	2	32+3	1	1	0	1	0	2	0	2	1
18	FW	(Ghana) GHA	Barnes Osei	19	6	15	5	0	0	0	0	0+2	0	1+1	1
19	DF	(Togo) TOG	Simon Gbegnon	31	3	25+1	3	0	0	1	0	2	0	2	0
21	MF	(Georgia (country)) GEO	Giorgi Kutsia	40	1	16+18	1	1	0	0+1	0	2	0	1+1	0
22	DF	(Netherlands) NED	Fabian Sporkslede	35	2	25+5	2	0	0	1	0	2	0	2	0
23	MF	(Georgia (country)) GEO	Giorgi Moistsrapishvili	13	2	4+9	2	0	0	0	0	0	0	0	0
24	DF	(Georgia (country)) GEO	Nodar Iashvili	11	0	2+5	0	1	0	0+1	0	0+1	0	0+1	0
25	MF	(Georgia (country)) GEO	Tornike Morchiladze	28	1	9+15	1	0	0	0	0	0+2	0	0+2	0
27	MF	(Georgia (country)) GEO	Anzor Mekvabishvili	40	1	24+11	1	1	0	1	0	0+1	0	1+1	0
32	FW	(Serbia) SRB	Zoran Marušić	42	18	35+1	16	1	0	1	1	2	1	2	0
38	MF	(Russia) RUS	Nodar Kavtaradze	17	1	5+8	1	0	0	0	0	0+2	0	1+1	0
39	DF	(Georgia (country)) GEO	Saba Khvadagiani	30	1	25+1	1	0	0	0	0	2	0	2	0
Dinamo Tbilisi II Players:
2	DF	(Georgia (country)) GEO	Giorgi Maisuradze	1	0	0+1	0	0	0	0	0	0	0	0	0
14	FW	(Georgia (country)) GEO	Jaduli Iobashvili	1	0	0+1	0	0	0	0	0	0	0	0	0
26	FW	(Georgia (country)) GEO	Nika Kokosadze	1	0	0+1	0	0	0	0	0	0	0	0	0
28	FW	(Georgia (country)) GEO	Giorgi Omarashvili	1	0	0+1	0	0	0	0	0	0	0	0	0
29	MF	(Georgia (country)) GEO	Nodar Lominadze	1	0	0+1	0	0	0	0	0	0	0	0	0
30	GK	(Georgia (country)) GEO	Luka Kutaladze	3	0	2	0	1	0	0	0	0	0	0	0
31	DF	(Georgia (country)) GEO	Giorgi Chkhetiani	1	0	0+1	0	0	0	0	0	0	0	0	0
31	MF	(Georgia (country)) GEO	Lasha Atskureli	1	0	1	0	0	0	0	0	0	0	0	0
34	MF	(Georgia (country)) GEO	Dito Pachulia	1	0	0+1	0	0	0	0	0	0	0	0	0
Players away from Dinamo Tbilisi on loan:
17	FW	(Georgia (country)) GEO	Tornike Akhvlediani	22	4	5+14	4	1	0	0+1	0	0+1	0	0	0
Players who left Dinamo Tbilisi during the season:
3	DF	(Spain) ESP	Víctor Mongil	21	0	18+1	0	1	0	1	0	0	0	0	0
7	MF	(Georgia (country)) GEO	Levan Tsotsonava	1	0	0+1	0	0	0	0	0	0	0	0	0
14	FW	(Georgia (country)) GEO	Davit Zurabiani	1	0	0+1	0	0	0	0	0	0	0	0	0
18	MF	(Slovakia) SVK	Filip Oršula	1	0	0+1	0	0	0	0	0	0	0	0	0
20	MF	(Guinea) GUI	Sekou Keita	6	0	0+6	0	0	0	0	0	0	0	0	0
28	FW	(Spain) ESP	Carlos Castro	5	0	0+4	0	0+1	0	0	0	0	0	0	0
30	GK	(Georgia (country)) GEO	Roin Kvaskhvadze	18	0	17	0	0	0	1	0	0	0	0	0
30	GK	(Georgia (country)) GEO	Luka Kharshiladze	2	0	0	0	0	0	0	0	2	0	0	0
34	MF	(Georgia (country)) GEO	Luka Gagnidze	16	1	11+4	1	0+1	0	0	0	0	0	0	0
38	MF	(Georgia (country)) GEO	Giorgi Abuashvili	4	0	1+3	0	0	0	0	0	0	0	0	0

=== Goal scorers ===
Place	Position	Nation	Number	Name	Erovnuli Liga	Georgian Cup	Super Cup	UEFA Champions League	UEFA Europa Conference League	Total
1	FW	(Serbia)	32	Zoran Marušić	16	0	1	1	0	18
2	FW	(Georgia (country))	9	Giorgi Gabedava	10	0	1	0	0	11
3	FW	(Ghana)	18	Barnes Osei	5	0	0	0	1	6
4	MF	(Serbia)	8	Milan Radin	4	0	0	1	0	5
5	FW	(Georgia (country))	17	Tornike Akhvlediani	4	0	0	0	0	4
6	DF	(Togo)	19	Simon Gbegnon	3	0	0	0	0	3
7	DF	(Georgia (country))	12	Levan Kharabadze	2	0	0	0	0	2
7	DF	(Netherlands)	22	Fabian Sporkslede	2	0	0	0	0	2
7	MF	(Georgia (country))	23	Giorgi Moistsrapishvili	2	0	0	0	0	2
7	FW	(Georgia (country))	11	Davit Skhirtladze	2	0	0	0	0	2
7	MF	(Georgia (country))	15	Giorgi Papava	1	0	0	0	1	2
12	DF	(Georgia (country))	39	Saba Khvadagiani	1	0	0	0	0	1
12	MF	(Georgia (country))	6	Bakar Kardava	1	0	0	0	0	1
12	MF	(Georgia (country))	21	Giorgi Kutsia	1	0	0	0	0	1
12	MF	(Georgia (country))	25	Tornike Morchiladze	1	0	0	0	0	1
12	MF	(Georgia (country))	27	Anzor Mekvabishvili	1	0	0	0	0	1
12	MF	(Georgia (country))	34	Luka Gagnidze	1	0	0	0	0	1
12	MF	(Russia)	38	Nodar Kavtaradze	1	0	0	0	0	1
12				Own goal	1	0	0	0	0	1
				TOTALS	59	0	2	2	2	65

=== Clean sheets ===
Place	Position	Nation	Number	Name	Erovnuli Liga	Georgian Cup	Super Cup	UEFA Champions League	UEFA Europa Conference League	Total
1	GK	(Georgia (country))	30	Roin Kvaskhvadze	9	0	0	0	0	9
2	GK	(Spain)	1	Andrés Prieto	7	0	0	0	0	7
3	GK	(Georgia (country))	13	Omar Migineishvili	1	0	0	0	0	1
				TOTALS	17	0	0	0	0	17

=== Disciplinary record ===
Number	Nation	Position	Name	Erovnuli Liga		Georgian Cup		Super Cup		UEFA Champions League		UEFA Europa Conference League		Total	
Number	Nation	Position	Name	Yellow card	Red card	Yellow card	Red card	Yellow card	Red card	Yellow card	Red card	Yellow card	Red card	Yellow card	Red card
1	(Spain)	GK	Andrés Prieto	1	0	0	0	0	0	0	0	0	0	1	0
3	(Georgia (country))	DF	Aleksandre Kalandadze	1	0	0	0	0	0	0	0	0	0	1	0
5	(Georgia (country))	DF	Davit Kobouri	1	0	0	0	0	0	0	0	0	0	1	0
6	(Georgia (country))	MF	Bakar Kardava	0	0	0	0	0	0	1	0	0	0	1	0
8	(Serbia)	MF	Milan Radin	9	0	1	0	0	0	1	0	0	0	11	0
9	(Georgia (country))	FW	Giorgi Gabedava	2	0	0	0	0	0	1	0	0	0	3	0
12	(Georgia (country))	DF	Levan Kharabadze	2	0	0	0	0	0	0	0	0	0	2	0
15	(Georgia (country))	MF	Giorgi Papava	4	0	0	0	0	0	0	0	1	0	5	0
18	(Ghana)	FW	Barnes Osei	2	0	0	0	0	0	0	0	1	0	3	0
19	(Togo)	DF	Simon Gbegnon	1	0	0	0	0	0	1	0	0	0	2	0
21	(Georgia (country))	MF	Giorgi Kutsia	6	0	0	0	1	0	1	0	2	0	10	0
22	(Netherlands)	DF	Fabian Sporkslede	5	0	0	0	0	0	0	0	1	0	6	0
23	(Georgia (country))	MF	Giorgi Moistsrapishvili	1	0	0	0	0	0	0	0	0	0	1	0
24	(Georgia (country))	DF	Nodar Iashvili	1	0	0	0	0	0	1	0	1	0	3	0
25	(Georgia (country))	MF	Tornike Morchiladze	3	0	0	0	0	0	1	0	0	0	4	0
27	(Georgia (country))	MF	Anzor Mekvabishvili	3	0	1	0	0	0	0	0	0	0	4	0
32	(Serbia)	FW	Zoran Marušić	2	0	0	0	0	0	0	0	0	0	2	0
38	(Russia)	MF	Nodar Kavtaradze	1	0	0	0	0	0	0	0	1	0	2	0
39	(Georgia (country))	DF	Saba Khvadagiani	5	0	0	0	0	0	0	0	0	0	5	0
Players away on loan:
17	(Georgia (country))	FW	Tornike Akhvlediani	1	0	0	0	0	0	0	0	0	0	1	0
Players who left Dinamo Tbilisi during the season:
3	(Spain)	DF	Víctor Mongil	2	0	0	0	0	0	0	0	0	0	2	0
20	(Guinea)	MF	Sekou Keita	1	0	0	0	0	0	0	0	0	0	1	0
34	(Georgia (country))	MF	Luka Gagnidze	2	0	0	0	0	0	0	0	0	0	2	0
			TOTALS	56	0	2	0	1	0	7	0	7	0	73	0
