= 2021 Georgian Super Cup =

Dinamo Tbilisi	Gagra
2	2
- Date: 21 February 2021
- Venue: Mikheil Meskhi Stadium, Tbilisi
- Referee: Irakli Serkadze
- Attendance: 0

2021 Georgian Super Cup was a Georgian football match that was played on 21 February 2021 between the champions of the 2022 Erovnuli Liga, Dinamo Tbilisi, and the 2020 Georgian Cup winners Gagra.

On 3 February 2021, the Georgian Football Federation announced that the Super Cup would be held on 21 February 2021 at the Mikheil Meskhi Stadium in Tbilisi, with kick-off scheduled for 18:00.

Dinamo Tbilisi defeated Gagra 5–4 on penalties after the game initially finished a 2–2 draw.

== Match details ==
21 February 2021
18:00 UTC+04:00

Dinamo Tbilisi	2–2	Gagra
Marušić 47'; Gabedava 67'; Kutsia (yellow card) 90'	Report	Kobuladze 13'; Chaduneli (yellow card) 49'; Nozadze 72'
Penalties
Sporkslede (penalty scored); Kutsia (penalty scored); Mongil (penalty scored); Kvaskhvadze (penalty scored); Gabedava (penalty scored)	5 – 4	(penalty scored) Khositashvili; (penalty scored) Kakiashvili; (penalty scored) Chaduneli; (penalty missed) Markozashvili; (penalty scored) Makatsaria

Mikheil Meskhi Stadium, Tbilisi
Attendance: 0
Referee: Irakli Serkadze

Dinamo Tbilisi	Dinamo Batumi

GK	30	(Georgia (country)) Roin Kvaskhvadze
DF	3	(Spain) Víctor Mongil
DF	5	(Georgia (country)) Davit Kobouri		(substituted off) 79'
DF	19	(Togo) Simon Gbegnon
DF	22	(Netherlands) Fabian Sporkslede
MF	6	(Georgia (country)) Bakar Kardava		(substituted off) 59'
MF	8	(Serbia) Milan Radin
MF	15	(Georgia (country)) Giorgi Papava
MF	27	(Georgia (country)) Anzor Mekvabishvili
FW	9	(Georgia (country)) Giorgi Gabedava
FW	32	(Serbia) Zoran Marušić		(substituted off) 79'
Substitutes:
GK	13	(Georgia (country)) Omar Migineishvili
MF	7	(Georgia (country)) Levan Tsotsonava
FW	16	(Spain) Carlos Castro
FW	17	(Georgia (country)) Tornike Akhvlediani		(substituted on) 79'
MF	21	(Georgia (country)) Giorgi Kutsia	(yellow card) 90'	(substituted on) 59'
MF	23	(Georgia (country)) Giorgi Moistsrapishvili
DF	24	(Georgia (country)) Nodar Iashvili		(substituted on) 79'
Manager:
(Georgia (country)) Georgi Nemsadze

GK	1	(Georgia (country)) Davit Kereselidze
DF	2	(Georgia (country)) Vasil Khositashvili
DF	4	(Georgia (country)) Gia Chaduneli	(yellow card) 49'
DF	5	(Georgia (country)) Luka Nozadze
DF	15	(Georgia (country)) Giorgi Kobuladze
MF	9	(Georgia (country)) Ivane Khabelashvili		(substituted off) 65'
MF	11	(Georgia (country)) Guram Samushia		(substituted off) 71'
MF	14	(Georgia (country)) Luka Kikabidze		(substituted off) 59'
MF	17	(Georgia (country)) Giorgi Vekua		(substituted off) 71'
MF	23	(Georgia (country)) Erekle Sultanishvili		(substituted off) 59'
FW	29	(Georgia (country)) Tamaz Makatsaria
Substitutes:
GK	31	(Georgia (country)) Nika Kavtaradze
DF	3	(Georgia (country)) Davit Sajaia		(substituted on) 71'
DF	6	(Georgia (country)) Rati Kakiashvili		(substituted on) 59'
MF	7	(Georgia (country)) Teimuraz Markozashvili		(substituted on) 71'
MF	22	(Georgia (country)) Lasha Chikhradze
FW		(Georgia (country)) Davit Ionanidze		(substituted on) 65'
FW		(Georgia (country)) Tornike Mumladze
Manager:
(Georgia (country)) Gia Geguchadze

== See also ==
- 2021 Erovnuli Liga
- 2021 Georgian Cup
