= Dylan Mertens =

Dutch footballer (born 1995)

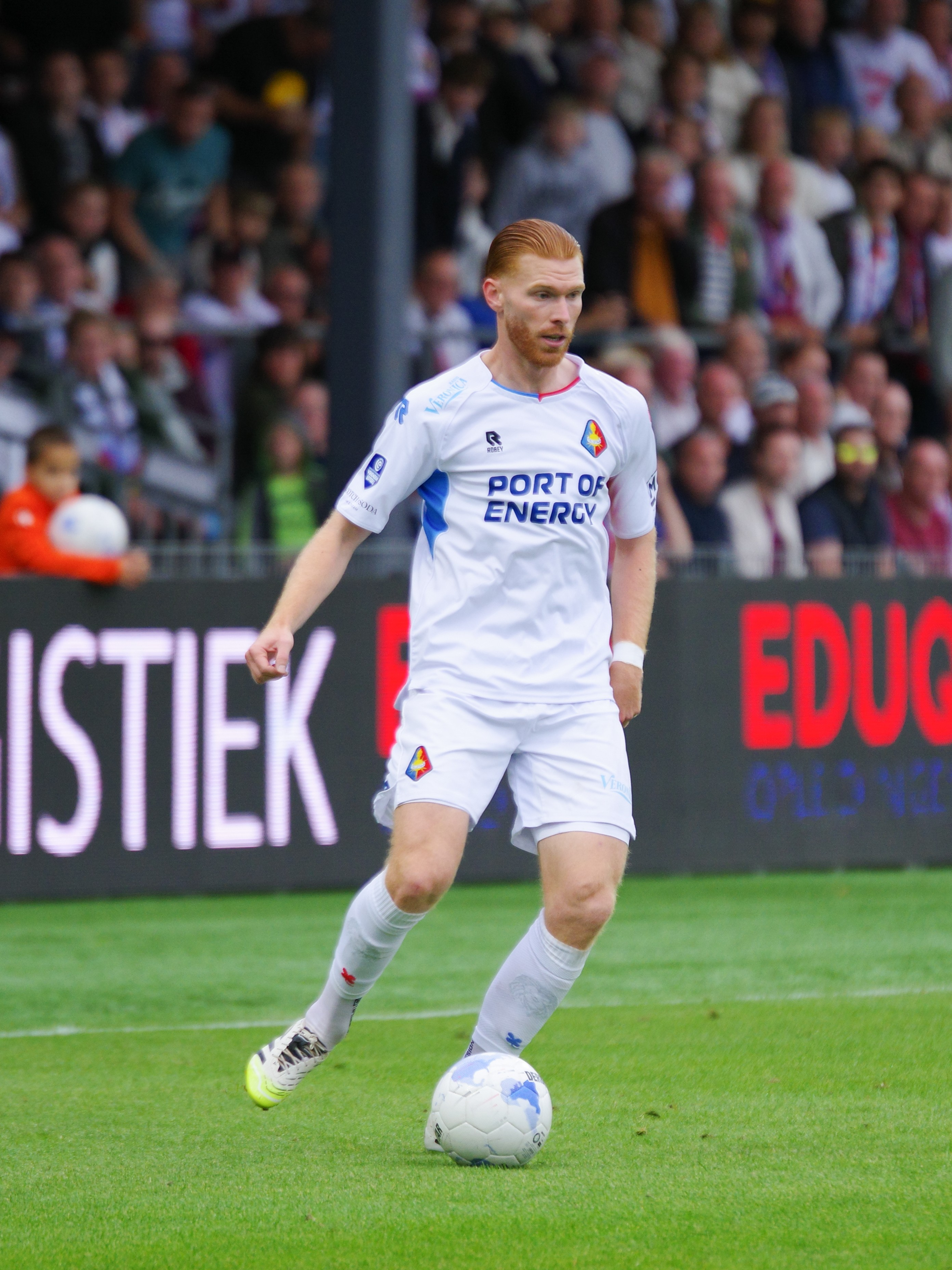
- Dylan Mertens in 2025.

Personal information
- Date of birth: 20 July 1995 (age 31)
- Place of birth: Amsterdam, Netherlands
- Height: 1.87 m (6 ft 2 in)
- Position: Midfielder

Team information
- Current team: Shafa Baku
- Number: 10

Youth career
- –2005: SDW
- 2005–2006: DWS
- 2006–2008: AFC
- 2008–2010: Utrecht
- 2010–2011: AFC
- 2011–2013: Argon
- 2013–2014: FC Den Bosch

Senior career*
Years	Team	Apps	(Gls)
2014–2018	Volendam	38	(2)
2018–2019	Telstar	19	(2)
2019	TOP Oss	1	(0)
2020	Koninklijke HFC	4	(1)
2020–2021	Tsarsko Selo Sofia	25	(1)
2021–2024	Botev Plovdiv	66	(4)
2024–2025	Fakel Voronezh	27	(0)
2025–2026	Telstar	20	(0)
2026–	Shafa	0	(0)
- * Club domestic league appearances and goals as of 21:22, 17 May 2026 (UTC)

Dylan Mertens (born 20 July 1995) is a Dutch professional footballer who plays as a midfielder for Azerbaijan Premier League club Shafa.

== Career ==
=== Youth ===
Mertens was born in Amsterdam. He played for SDW, DWS and AFC before joining the FC Utrecht Youth Academy in 2008. Two years later he had to leave and decided to return to AFC. His return was not for long and after one season he moved to SV Argon. In the summer of 2013 he made the move to FC Den Bosch, where he played with the A1 (Under 19).

=== FC Volendam ===
In the preparation of the 2014–15 season, Mertens joined FC Volendam on an amateur basis. That season, he played 15 matches in the second team in which he scored 4 times. He also made it to the match selection of the first team two times, but didn't make his debut. On 30 March 2015, he signed his first professional contract with FC Volendam, until mid 2017.

In the summer of 2015, Mertens joined the first team. On 7 August 2015, he made his debut for FC Volendam in the league match against NAC Breda (4–1 win). He replaced Rafik El Hamdi after 79 minutes. On 18 September 2015, he scored his first goal for FC Volendam, the opening goal in a 2–0 win against Helmond Sport. In February 2016, Mertens extended his contract at FC Volendam until mid 2018.

In the preparation of the 2016–17 season, Mertens tore off his ACL and was unable to play for the rest of the season. On 29 April 2017, 10 months later, he made his comeback in a match of Jong FC Volendam against FC Rijnvogels.

=== Telstar ===
On 21 June 2018, Mertens signed a one-year contract with an option for an additional season with Eerste Divisie club Telstar. He made 19 appearances in the 2018–19 season, scoring twice.

=== TOP Oss ===
On 8 August 2019, it was announced that Mertens had signed a contract until the summer 2020 with TOP Oss. However, after a disappointing start on the season, the club announced on 17 October 2019, that Mertens was one of three players that had left the club.

=== Fakel Voronezh ===
In June 2024, Mertens joined Russian Premier League side Fakel Voronezh. He left Fakel at the conclusion of the 2024–25 season, following Fakel's relegation.

=== Return to Telstar ===
In early July 2025, Mertens returned to Telstar for a trial ahead of the club's first Eredivisie season since 1978, having previously represented them in the 2018–19 season. During pre-season, he addressed public questions about his spell in Russia following the country's 2022 Russian invasion of Ukraine, saying that he had weighed the decision carefully and that everyday life and league matches had continued as normal while he was there. On 8 August, he signed a one-year contract with an option for an additional season, becoming Telstar's 18th contracted professional player in accordance with Eredivisie roster regulations.

He made his second debut for the club on 10 August, replacing Tyrese Noslin in the 76th minute of a 2–0 away defeat to Ajax, and made his first start on 20 September in a 2–0 loss to Groningen. He made 20 league appearances, mainly as a substitute, and left at the end of the season when his contract was not renewed.

=== Shafa Baku ===
On 9 July 2026, Mertens signed with recently promoted Azerbaijan Premier League club Shafa.

== Career statistics ==
As of match played 8 March 2026

Appearances and goals by club, season and competition
Club	Season	League			National Cup (Note: Includes KNVB Beker, Bulgarian Cup, Russian Cup)		Europe		Other		Total	
Club	Season	Division	Apps	Goals	Apps	Goals	Apps	Goals	Apps	Goals	Apps	Goals
Volendam	2014–15	Eerste Divisie	0	0	0	0	—		0	0	0	0
Volendam	2015–16	Eerste Divisie	29	2	1	0	—		0	0	30	2
Volendam	2016–17	Eerste Divisie	0	0	0	0	—		0	0	0	0
Volendam	2017–18	Eerste Divisie	9	0	2	0	—		—		11	0
Volendam	Total		38	2	3	0	0	0	0	0	41	2
Jong Volendam	2016–17	Derde Divisie	2	0	—		—		—		2	0
Jong Volendam	2017–18	Derde Divisie	22	10	—		—		1 (Note: Appearance in the promotion play-offs)	0	23	10
Jong Volendam	Total		24	10	0	0	0	0	1	0	25	10
Telstar	2018–19	Eerste Divisie	19	2	0	0	—		—		19	2
TOP Oss	2019–20	Eerste Divisie	1	0	—		—		—		1	0
Koninklijke	2019–20	Tweede Divisie	4	1	—		—		—		4	1
Tsarsko Selo	2020–21	Bulgarian First League	25	1	2	0	—		—		27	1
Botev Plovdiv	2021–22	Bulgarian First League	29	0	0	0	–		1 (Note: Appearance in the Bulgarian First League UECL play-offs)	0	30	0
Botev Plovdiv	2022–23	Bulgarian First League	26	1	2	1	2 (Note: Appearances in the UEFA Europa Conference League)	0	—		30	2
Botev Plovdiv	2023–24	Bulgarian First League	11	3	3	1	—		—		14	4
Botev Plovdiv	Total		66	4	5	2	2	0	1	0	74	6
Fakel Voronezh	2024–25	Russian Premier League	27	0	6	0	—		—		33	0
Telstar	2025–26	Eredivisie	20	0	4	0	—		—		24	0
Shafa	2026–27	Azerbaijan Premier League	27	0	6	0	—		—		33	0
Career total			224	20	19	2	2	0	2	0	247	22
