= Jordi Bitter =

Dutch former professional footballer

Personal information
- Full name: Jordi Bitter
- Date of birth: 19 January 1994 (age 32)
- Place of birth: Amsterdam, Netherlands
- Height: 1.76 m (5 ft 9 in)
- Position: Forward

Team information
- Current team: SV De Meteoor

Youth career
- 2000–2004: DCG
- 2004–2006: DTS
- 2006–2008: AZ
- 2008–2010: Haarlem
- 2010–2013: Ajax

Senior career*
Years	Team	Apps	(Gls)
2013–2014	Jong Ajax	2	(0)
2014–2015	Almere City	0	(0)
2015–2018	DTS		
2018–2021	Spakenburg	47	(12)
2021–2022	GVVV	42	(6)
2023–2025	Ajax Amateurs		

International career
2011	Netherlands U17	7	(0)
2013	Netherlands U21	1	(0)
- * Club domestic league appearances and goals as of 7 October 2024

Jordi Bitter (born 19 January 1994) is a Dutch footballer who plays as a forward for amateur side SV De Meteoor.

== Career ==
=== Early career ===
Bitter began his football career at the age of six with local amateur side RKSV DCG in his hometown Amsterdam. He then transferred to local SV DTS from where he joined the youth ranks of AZ in nearby Alkmaar and subsequently moved to HFC Haarlem after which he joined the youth ranks of the Dutch giants AFC Ajax, following the dissolution of the team from Haarlem in 2010.

=== AFC Ajax ===
Signing his first professional contract with AFC Ajax on 9 June 2011, a three-year deal binding him to the club until the summer 2014. Initially returning to the youth ranks, he was announced as a member of the Jong Ajax squad ahead of the 2013–14 season, having previously participated in preseason training with the first team, playing for the reserves team of Ajax who made their Eerste Divisie debut that season. On 28 October 2013 Bitter made his professional debut for Jong Ajax having recently recovered from a shoulder injury, he was substituted on in the 72'-minute of the match for Tobias Sana, in the 4–0 away loss against FC Dordrecht.

=== Almere City FC ===
On 20 May 2014 it was announced that Bitter would transfer to nearby partner club of Ajax; Almere City FC as a free transfer, where former Ajax youth coach Fred Grim was active.

=== Amateur years ===
After leaving Almere, he returned to boyhood club DTS Oudkarspel and in summer 2021, Bitter joined GVVV from fellow amateur side Spakenburg. In 2023 he signed with Vierde Divisie outfit Ajax Amateurs.

== International career ==
Bitter made his debut for the Netherlands under-17 squad in a friendly match against Greece U-17 on 8 February 2011, which ended in a 0–1 win for the Dutch. Following another friendly match for the Netherlands U-17, a 2–0 win over Belgium U-17 on 2 March 2011, Bitter was then called up for three qualification matches, ahead of the 2011 UEFA European Under-17 Championship in Serbia. Not making any appearances in the final tournament, which the Dutch won, securing their first European Under-17 Championship title. The three qualification matches in which Bitter did appear in were against Austria U-17, Croatia U-17 and Portugal U-17, which ended in 2 wins and a draw for the Netherlands. He did however play again in the 2011 FIFA U-17 World Cup for the Netherlands U-17, appearing in the fixtures against North Korea U-17 and Mexico U-17 in Mexico, which ended in a draw and a loss for the Dutch as they exited the tournament after the group stage.

== Career statistics ==
=== Club performance ===
As of 2014-07-06

Club performance			League		Cup		Continental^{1}		Other^{2}		Total	
Season	Club	League	Apps	Goals	Apps	Goals	Apps	Goals	Apps	Goals	Apps	Goals
Netherlands			League		KNVB Cup		Europe		Other		Total	
2013–14	Jong Ajax	Eerste Divisie	2	0	–	–	–	–	–	–	2	0
2014–15	Almere City	Eerste Divisie	0	0	0	0	–	–	–	–	0	0
Total	Netherlands		2	0	0	0	–	–	–	–	2	0
Career total			2	0	0	0	–	–	–	–	2	0

^{1} Includes UEFA Champions League and UEFA Europa League matches.

^{2} Includes Johan Cruijff Shield and Play-off matches.
