= Daoud Bousbiba =

Dutch professional footballer

Personal information
- Date of birth: 15 January 1995 (age 31)
- Place of birth: Amsterdam, Netherlands
- Height: 1.83 m (6 ft 0 in)
- Position: Winger

Team information
- Current team: Ajax Amateurs

Youth career
- –2010: Ajax
- 2010–2012: Almere City
- 2012–2015: Ajax

Senior career*
Years	Team	Apps	(Gls)
2015–2016	TEC	15	(4)
2016–2017	Eindhoven	13	(0)
2017–2018	Gaziantep	2	(0)
2018–2019	Hassania Agadir	0	(0)
2019	ADO '20	10	(2)
2020–2021	Kalamata	26	(3)
2021–2022	Fostiras		
2022	Asteras Vlachioti	4	(0)
2022–2023	Rodos		
2023	Ialysos		
2024–	Ajax Amateurs		
- * Club domestic league appearances and goals as of 7 October 2024

Daoud Bousbiba (Arabic: داود داود; born 15 January 1995) is a Dutch footballer who plays as a winger for Ajax Amateurs.
