= AFC Ajax (amateurs) =

Dutch football club

Coordinates: 52°18′48″N 4°55′44″E

Ajax Amateurs
- Full name: Amsterdamsche Football Club Ajax Amateurs
- Nicknames: Joden (Jews), Godenzonen (Sons of the Gods); De Ajacieden; Lucky Ajax
- Founded: 18 March 1900
- Ground: De Toekomst, Amsterdam (Ouder-Amstel)
- Capacity: 5,000
- Chairman: Hennie Henrichs
- Manager: Richard Middelkoop
- League: Vierde Divisie
- 2024–25: Derde Divisie A, 16th of 18 (relegated via play-offs)
- Website: https://ajaxzaterdag.nl/
Home colours	Away colours

AFC Ajax Amateurs or Ajax Zaterdag (Dutch pronunciation: [ˈaːjɑk(s) ˈsaːtərdɑx]; English: "Ajax Saturday") is a Dutch amateur football club and the amateur team of the professional club Ajax from Amsterdam. They compete in the Vierde Divisie, playing their home matches at the Sportpark De Toekomst training grounds.

== Club history ==
AFC Ajax Amateurs, better known as Ajax Zaterdag is a Dutch amateur football club founded 18 March 1900. It is the amateur team of the professional club AFC Ajax from Amsterdam, who play their home matches at the Sportpark De Toekomst training grounds to a capacity of 5,000. The team was promoted from the Eerste Klasse to the Hoofdklasse ahead of the 2011–12 season. The team has won the Eerste Klasse title twice, as well as the *KNVB District Cup West I on two occasions as well.

Following the 2013–14 Hoofdklasse season, the team was promoted to the Topklasse leading to the top tiered teams of the Amsterdam club to compete in the top three tiers of professional football in the Netherlands, AFC Ajax (Eredivisie), Jong Ajax (Eerste Divisie) and Ajax Zaterdag (Topklasse). After one season the team finished 14th and relegated back to the Hoofdklasse.

== Players ==
As of 1 January 2025

Note: Flags indicate national team as defined under FIFA eligibility rules; some limited exceptions apply. Players may hold more than one non-FIFA nationality.

No.	Pos.	Nation	Player
—	GK	NED	Abdessalam Ouboumalne
—	GK	NED	Jesper van der Mark
—	DF	CUW	Darryl Lachman
—	DF	NED	Roy Deken
—	DF	NED	Ruben Ligeon
—	DF	NED	Nino van den Heuvel
—	DF	NED	Bram van Dongen
—	DF	NED	Tim Brinkman
—	DF	NED	Younes El Morabet
—	MF	NED	Guiliano With
—	MF	SUR	Fabian Sporkslede

No.	Pos.	Nation	Player
—	MF	NED	Darren Rosheuvel
—	MF	NED	Tim Correia
—	MF	NED	Daniël van Son
—	MF	NED	Adil Amghar El Yettefti
—	FW	NED	Jordi Bitter
—	FW	NED	Jip Bartels
—	FW	NED	Daoud Bousbiba
—	FW	NED	Kenneth Misa Danso
—	FW	NED	Danilio Ruperti
—	FW	NED	Mitchi Huijsman
—	FW	GUY	Terell Ondaan

== Current staff ==
Technical staff
Position	Name
Manager	Bart Logchies
Assistant manager	Dennis van der Wal
Assistant manager	Detlef Le Grand
Medical staff
Position	Name
Physiotherapist	Mohamed Oumouh
Physiotherapist	Thomas Hamersma
Physiotherapist	Frank van Deursen
Fitness coach / Recovery trainer	Björn Rekelhof
Accompanying staff
Position	Name
Team manager	Jan Fleijsman
Players supervisor	Dick Goossens
Materials manager	Rob Versluis
Assistant referee	Stephan Tulleners
Secretary	Marjon van Nielen

== Honours ==
=== Club ===
- Vierde Divisie A (1): 2023–24
- Eerste Klasse A (2): 2003, 2012
- Tweede Klasse C (1): 1993
- Derde Klasse B (1): 1992
- Vierde Klasse C (1): 1990
- Hoofdklasse AVB Zaterdag (1): 1989
- Eerste Klasse A AVB Zaterdag (1): 1988
- Eerste Klasse D AVB Zaterdag (1): 1987
- Eerste Klasse C AVB Zaterdag (1): 1990
- KNVB District Cup West I (2): 2005, 2008
- Promotion to Topklasse: 2014
- Promotion to Eerste Klasse: 1995
- Placement for KNVB Cup: 2004, 2005, 2008, 2021
- Promotion to Derde Divisie: 2018
