= Saša Marjanović =

Serbian footballer

Personal information
- Date of birth: 13 November 1987 (age 38)
- Place of birth: Niš, SFR Yugoslavia
- Height: 1.82 m (6 ft 0 in)
- Position: Midfielder

Youth career
- Železničar Niš
- Partizan

Senior career*
Years	Team	Apps	(Gls)
2005–2009	Čukarički	79	(5)
2009–2012	Jagodina	45	(4)
2012–2013	Sheriff Tiraspol	14	(0)
2014–2016	Radnički Niš	73	(17)
2016–2018	Partizan	10	(0)
2018–2019	Aktobe	38	(3)
2019–2020	Nea Salamina	21	(1)
2020–2022	Napredak Kruševac	48	(10)
2022–2023	Radnički Niš	35	(5)
2024–2025	Napredak Kruševac	37	(1)
- * Club domestic league appearances and goals as of 15 June 2025

Saša Marjanović (Serbian Cyrillic: Саша Марјановић; born 13 November 1987) is a Serbian professional footballer who plays as a midfielder.

== Club career ==
=== Čukarički ===
Born in Niš, Marjanović started his senior career with Čukarički in the Serbian First League. Previously, he was a member of Partizan youth categories. For the 2007–08 season, Čukarički was promoted in the Serbian SuperLiga. On 11 August 2007, Marjanović made his Serbian SuperLiga debut in a 0–0 away draw against Red Star Belgrade. Marjanović spent 4 seasons playing for Čukarički and scored 5 goals during that period.

=== Jagodina ===
After left Čukarički, Marjanović joined Jagodina for the 2009–10 season. For the first season, he was usually the first choice, but in the next season he made just 6 appearances because of injury. Later he extended his contract for two years. For the last season with Jagodina, he played 16 league matches with 3 goals and also scored a goal in a cup match against Javor Ivanjica, played on 26 October 2011. On 20 May 2012, Marjanović has score from a free kick to give his team a 1–0 win over Novi Pazar and helping to his team standing in qualifying for UEFA Europa League in next season. During the spring half of the 2011–12 season, he was also nominated as the man of the match once time, in a match against Sloboda Užice.

=== Sheriff Tiraspol ===
In summer 2012, Marjanović signed with Sheriff Tiraspol together with Marko Stanojević. He made his debut in Sheriff on 13 July 2012, against Costuleni as a substitute for Alexandru Pașcenco in the 73rd minute. Four days later, Marjanović made his debut in UEFA club competitions playing full 90 minutes against Ulisses and providing one assist in 0–1 away win. Although he did not play constantly, in some interviews he spoke about professionalism at the club. He ended season with total 20 official caps with 1 goal. After 6 months without playing football, he left the club in the winter break off 2013–14 season.

=== Radnički Niš ===
Marjanović returned in his hometown beginning of 2014, and signed a one-year deal with Radnički. He made 10 appearances for the spring half of 2013–14 season with just 4 starts. During the 2014–15 season, Marjanović played 27 SuperLiga and scored 5 goals, and also appeared in 2 cup matches. He also stayed with the club in new season, and became one of the most important players in midfield for coach Milan Rastavac, along with Aleksandar Jovanović and Petar Đuričković. As one of the most standard players in squad, Marjanović noted 34 caps with 5 goals until the 28 April 2016 when he scored 5 goals at one match against Radnik Surdulica in 33 fixture of the 2015–16 Serbian SuperLiga season. Marjanović also scored 2 of 5 goals for Radnički in away victory against his ex club, Čukarički on 7 May 2016. In next fixture, he scored a goal for first win of Radnički against Partizan at the Čair Stadium after 22 years.

=== Partizan ===
Marjanović signed a two-year contract with Partizan on 7 June 2016. He was given the number 17 jersey, previously worn by Andrija Živković. He made his debut for new club on 14 August 2016, replacing Valeri Bojinov in a match against Čukarički. After 8 matches at total he collected under coaches Ivan Tomić and Marko Nikolić in the first half-season, he missed the rest of the campaign in both domestic competitions. He noted his first match in the 2017–18 Serbian SuperLiga season on 9 September 2017 under Miroslav Đukić, after 10 months without competitive matches. In the mid-season, Marjanović mutually terminated the contract with Partizan and left them as a free agent on 10 January 2018.

=== Aktobe ===
On 27 February 2018, Marjanović signed a two-year contract with Aktobe.

== Career statistics ==
As of match played 11 November 2018

Appearances and goals by club, season and competition
Club	Season	League			Cup		Continental		Other		Total	
Club	Season	Division	Apps	Goals	Apps	Goals	Apps	Goals	Apps	Goals	Apps	Goals
Čukarički	2005–06	Serbian First League	32	2	—		—		—		32	2
Čukarički	2006–07	Serbian First League	29	2	—		—		—		29	2
Čukarički	2007–08	Serbian SuperLiga	17	1	—		—		—		17	1
Čukarički	2008–09	Serbian SuperLiga	1	0	—		—		—		1	0
Čukarički	Total		79	5	—		—		—		79	5
Jagodina	2009–10	Serbian SuperLiga	23	1	1	0	—		—		24	1
Jagodina	2010–11	Serbian SuperLiga	6	0	0	0	—		—		6	0
Jagodina	2011–12	Serbian SuperLiga	16	3	1	1	—		—		17	4
Jagodina	Total		45	4	2	1	—		—		47	5
Sheriff Tiraspol	2012–13	Moldovan National Division	14	0	1	1	4	0	1 (Note: Appearance in the Moldovan Super Cup)	0	20	1
Sheriff Tiraspol	2013–14	Moldovan National Division	0	0	0	0	0	0	0	0	0	0
Sheriff Tiraspol	Total		14	0	1	1	4	0	1	0	20	1
Radnički Niš	2013–14	Serbian SuperLiga	10	0	—		—		—		10	0
Radnički Niš	2014–15	Serbian SuperLiga	27	5	2	0	—		—		29	5
Radnički Niš	2015–16	Serbian SuperLiga	36	12	3	1	—		—		39	13
Radnički Niš	Total		73	17	5	1	—		—		78	18
Partizan	2016–17	Serbian SuperLiga	6	0	1	0	1	0	—		8	0
Partizan	2017–18	Serbian SuperLiga	4	0	0	0	0	0	—		4	0
Partizan	Total		10	0	1	0	1	0	—		12	0
Aktobe	2018	Kazakhstan Premier League	23	3	1	0	0	0	—		24	3
Career total			244	29	10	3	5	0	1	0	260	32

== Honours ==
Čukarički

- Serbian First League: 2006–07

Sheriff Tiraspol

- Moldovan National Division (2): 2012–13, 2013–14
- Moldovan Super Cup: 2013

Partizan

- Serbian SuperLiga: 2016–17
- Serbian Cup: 2016–17

Individual

- Serbian SuperLiga Player of the Week: 2021–22 (Round 5, Round 24, Round 30)
