= Milan Radin =

Serbian footballer

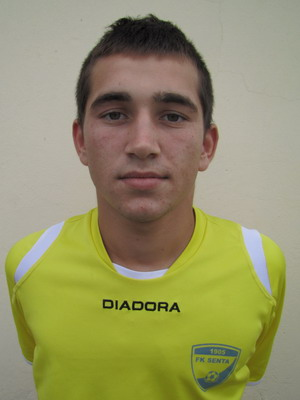
- Radin with Senta in 2010

Personal information
- Date of birth: 25 June 1991 (age 35)
- Place of birth: Novi Sad, SFR Yugoslavia
- Height: 1.73 m (5 ft 8 in)
- Position: Defensive midfielder

Team information
- Current team: TSC
- Number: 7

Youth career
- Miletić Mošorin
- Borac Šajkaš
- Novi Sad

Senior career*
Years	Team	Apps	(Gls)
2009–2010	Novi Sad	0	(0)
2009–2010	→ Jugović Kać (loan)	?	(8)
2010–2012	Senta	47	(5)
2012–2013	Radnički Nova Pazova	30	(1)
2014–2015	Mladost Lučani	29	(0)
2016	Voždovac	13	(0)
2016–2018	Partizan	21	(0)
2018–2019	Aktobe	40	(5)
2019–2020	Korona Kielce	27	(1)
2019	Korona Kielce II	2	(0)
2020–2021	Inđija	9	(0)
2021	Dinamo Tbilisi	31	(4)
2022	Dinamo Batumi	28	(7)
2023–	TSC	111	(3)

International career
2021	Serbia	1	(0)
- * Club domestic league appearances and goals as of 1 November 2026

Milan Radin (Serbian Cyrillic: Милан Радин; born 25 June 1991) is a Serbian professional footballer who plays as a defensive midfielder for TSC.

== Club career ==
Born in Novi Sad, Radin grew up in Mošorin, where he started playing football at the local club Miletić. Later he played with Borac Šajkaš and finally with RFK Novi Sad, where he completed his youth categories. He signed a three-year scholarship deal with the club, before being loaned to Jugović Kać in the 2009–10 season, scoring eight league goals. Subsequently, Radin went on a trial with Smederevo, before eventually joining Senta. He spent two seasons at the club, before switching to Radnički Nova Pazova. In 2014 winter transfer window, Radin signed with Mladost Lučani, helping them win promotion to the top flight of Serbian football. He was suspended by the club after refusing to renew his contract in August 2015. His contract was finally terminated in December 2015. In early 2016, Radin spent some time on trial with Russian club Arsenal Tula, but no deal was concluded. He eventually joined Voždovac shortly after.

On 4 June 2016, Radin signed a three-year contract with Partizan, choosing the number 29 shirt. On 29 October 2016, Radin made his competitive debut for Partizan, playing as a right back in a 3–1 away victory over Radnik Surdulica He collected 12 games and won the double in his debut season in Partizan. Radin played full both matches in play-off round for 2017–18 UEFA Europa League and helped club to reach group stage of the Europa League by beating Videoton. He played full match against Dynamo Kyiv in second match of the group stage, on 28 September 2017.

On 27 February 2018, it was announced Radin moved to the Kazakhstan Premier League side Aktobe as a free agent, extending his contract for the 2019 season on 25 January 2019. However, he signed with Polish club Korona Kielce on 26 June 2019. He penned a two-year contract.

On 23 January 2021, he signed a one-year contract with Dinamo Tbilisi.

Radin earned his first cap in a January 2021 friendly match away against Panama.

== Career statistics ==
=== Club ===
As of match played 17 May 2024

Appearances and goals by club, season and competition
Club	Season	League			Cup		Continental		Total	
Club	Season	Division	Apps	Goals	Apps	Goals	Apps	Goals	Apps	Goals
Senta	2010–11	Serbian League Vojvodina	26	2	—		—		26	2
Senta	2011–12	Serbian League Vojvodina	21	3	—		—		21	3
Senta	Total		47	5	—		—		47	5
Radnički Nova Pazova	2012–13	Serbian First League	30	1	—		—		30	1
Radnički Nova Pazova	2013–14	Serbian League Vojvodina	0	0	—		—		0	0
Radnički Nova Pazova	Total		30	1	—		—		30	1
Mladost Lučani	2013–14	Serbian First League	8	0	—		—		8	0
Mladost Lučani	2014–15	Serbian SuperLiga	21	0	1	0	—		21	0
Mladost Lučani	2015–16	Serbian SuperLiga	0	0	0	0	—		0	0
Mladost Lučani	Total		29	0	1	0	—		30	0
Voždovac	2015–16	Serbian SuperLiga	13	0	—		—		13	0
Partizan	2016–17	Serbian SuperLiga	8	0	4	0	0	0	12	0
Partizan	2017–18	Serbian SuperLiga	13	0	1	0	5	0	19	0
Partizan	Total		21	0	5	0	5	0	31	0
Aktobe	2018	Kazakhstan Premier League	29	4	1	0	0	0	30	4
Aktobe	2019	Kazakhstan Premier League	11	1	1	0	0	0	12	1
Aktobe	Total		40	5	2	0	0	0	42	5
Korona Kielce	2019–20	Ekstraklasa	27	1	0	0	—		27	1
Korona Kielce II	2019–20	III liga, gr. IV	2	0	—		—		2	0
Inđija	2020–21	Serbian SuperLiga	9	0	1	0	—		10	0
Dinamo Tbilisi	2021	Erovnuli Liga	31	4	1	0	4	0	36	4
Dinamo Batumi	2022	Erovnuli Liga	28	7	1	0	4	0	33	7
TSC	2022–23	Serbian SuperLiga	10	0	1	0	—		11	0
TSC	2023–24	Serbian SuperLiga	31	2	0	0	8	0	39	2
TSC	Total		41	2	1	0	8	0	50	2
Career total			318	25	12	0	21	0	351	25

== Honours ==
Mladost Lučani

- Serbian First League: 2013–14

Partizan

- Serbian SuperLiga: 2016–17
- Serbian Cup: 2016–17, 2017–18

Dinamo Tbilisi

- Georgian Super Cup: 2021
