= Jip Bartels =

Dutch association footballer

Personal information
- Date of birth: 10 January 1993 (age 33)
- Place of birth: Utrecht, Netherlands
- Position: Striker

Youth career
- Kampong
- Jong Utrecht
- Jong Ajax

Senior career*
Years	Team	Apps	(Gls)
2013–2017	TEC	41	(14)
2017	Avondale		
2018	Preston Lions		
2019	Pascoe Vale		
2021–2025	Ajax Zaterdag	32	(7)
- * Club domestic league appearances and goals

Jip Bartels (born 10 January 1993) is a Dutch footballer who played as a striker.

== Early life ==
Born in Utrecht, Bartels was regarded as a prospect of Dutch side Ajax and received interest from English Premier League side Arsenal. He played in the academies of Utrecht and Ajax, but three cruciate ligament injuries denied him a professional career.

== Club career ==
Bartels started his career with Dutch side TEC, where he made forty-one league appearances and scored fourteen goals. In 2021, he signed for Dutch side Ajax Zaterdag, where he captained the club.

== Personal life ==
Bartels attended the Vrije Universiteit Amsterdam, where he was regarded as a high performing student. Bartels established a company that helps schools in Australia integrate physical activity into their curriculum.
