= Daniël van Son =

Dutch footballer (born 1994)

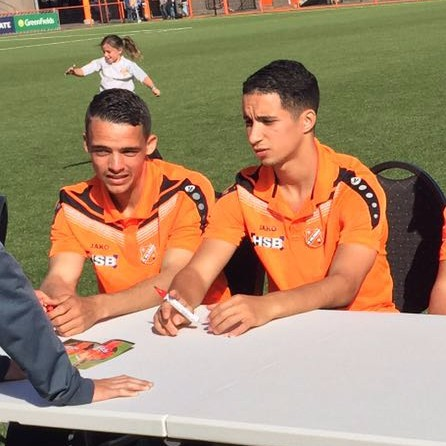
- Van Son (left) in 2016 (with Rafik El Hamdi)

Personal information
- Full name: Daniël van Son
- Date of birth: 14 February 1994 (age 32)
- Place of birth: Purmerend, Netherlands
- Height: 1.79 m (5 ft 10 in)
- Position: Right-back

Team information
- Current team: Ajax Amateurs
- Number: 11

Youth career
- KGB Bovenkarspel
- 2001–2004: FC Purmerend
- 2004–2008: AFC
- 2008–2012: Utrecht

Senior career*
Years	Team	Apps	(Gls)
2014–2017	Volendam	46	(2)
2017–2021	Koninklijke HFC	69	(8)
2021–2024	IJsselmeervogels	94	(4)
2024–	Ajax Amateurs		
- * Club domestic league appearances and goals as of 16:13, 7 October 2024 (UTC)

Daniël van Son (born 14 February 1994) is a Dutch footballer who plays as a right-back for Ajax Amateurs in the Derde Divisie.

== Playing career ==
=== Ijsselmeervogels ===
He joined IJsselmeervogels in the summer of 2021 having signed a pre-contract in November 2020. In 2023 he renewed his contract with a year, staying with the club until at least 2024.

== Training career ==
In April 2021 van Son joined his boyhood FC Purmerend club as a trainer of the under-11s. He has previous training experience training the under-17s of Alphense Boys and Hollandia as well as having been a trainer with Voetbal Academie Noord-Holland which he started with Dave Huisman.
