= 2018 FC Aktobe season =

FC Aktobe
2018 season
- Chairman: Sagat Yensegenuly
- Manager: Vladimir Mukhanov
- Stadium: Central Stadium
- Premier League: 7th
- Kazakhstan Cup: Round of 16 vs Kaisar
- Top goalscorer: League: Marcos Pizzelli (18); All: Marcos Pizzelli (18)
Home colours	Away colours

The 2018 FC Aktobe season is the 24th successive season that the club playing in the Kazakhstan Premier League, the highest tier of association football in Kazakhstan. Aktobe will also participate in the Kazakhstan Cup.

== Season events ==
After starting the season with a transfer ban, Aktobe were allowed to register new players on 20 March 2018. On 27 April, Aktobe had six points deducted as a punishment for unpaid debts to former player Danilo Neco.

== Squad ==
As of 30 July 2018

Note: Flags indicate national team as defined under FIFA eligibility rules; some limited exceptions apply. Players may hold more than one non-FIFA nationality.

No.	Pos.	Nation	Player
2	DF	KAZ	Adilkhan Tanzharikov
5	DF	KAZ	Bagdat Kairov
9	MF	KAZ	Ruslan Valiullin
10	FW	ARM	Marcos Pizzelli
11	MF	SRB	Saša Marjanović
13	GK	KAZ	Ramil Nurmukhametov
17	MF	KAZ	Ulan Konysbayev
19	MF	KAZ	Ardak Saulet
21	FW	HAI	Jean-Eudes Maurice
22	DF	RUS	Vitali Volkov
23	MF	CRO	Hrvoje Miličević
24	DF	SRB	Milan Radin
25	DF	KAZ	Sayat Zhumagali
28	MF	KAZ	Zakhar Korobov

No.	Pos.	Nation	Player
32	GK	KAZ	Mukhambet Tamabay
38	DF	KAZ	Ayber Temirbayev
39	DF	KAZ	Rustam Temirkhan
42	GK	KAZ	Igor Trofimets
47	MF	KAZ	Aslanbek Kakimov
50	FW	BRA	Reynaldo
51	MF	KAZ	Igor Boychuk
59	MF	KAZ	Alexandr Ussachev
71	MF	KAZ	Syrym Adilzhanov
77	MF	KAZ	Zhambyl Kukeyev
84	FW	KAZ	Adilkhan Zhumay
87	DF	SRB	Aleksandar Simčević (on loan from Ordabasy)
88	MF	KAZ	Anton Shurigin
95	MF	KAZ	Abat Aimbetov

== Transfers ==
=== Winter ===
In: Note: Flags indicate national team as defined under FIFA eligibility rules; some limited exceptions apply. Players may hold more than one non-FIFA nationality.

No.	Pos.	Nation	Player
2	MF	KAZ	Adilkhan Tanzharikov (from (Kazakhstan) Zhetysu)
6	DF	BRA	Fabrício (from (Cyprus) Omonia)
10	MF	ARM	Marcos Pizzelli (from (Saudi Arabia) Al-Shabab)
11	MF	SRB	Saša Marjanović (from (Serbia) Partizan)
13	GK	KAZ	Ramil Nurmukhametov (from (Kazakhstan) Ordabasy)
14	MF	KAZ	Igor Yurin (from (Kazakhstan) Okzhetpes)
17	MF	KAZ	Ulan Konysbayev
21	FW	HAI	Jean-Eudes Maurice (from (Kazakhstan) Taraz)
23	MF	CRO	Hrvoje Miličević (from (Italy) Pescara)
24	MF	SRB	Milan Radin (from (Serbia) Partizan)
50	FW	BRA	Reynaldo (from (Slovakia) Spartak Trnava)
73	MF	KAZ	Didar Zhalmukan (loan from (Kazakhstan) Astana)
87	DF	SRB	Aleksandar Simčević (loan from (Kazakhstan) Ordabasy)
—	GK	KAZ	David Loria (from (Kazakhstan) Irtysh Pavlodar)
—	MF	GEO	Jaba Jighauri (from (North Macedonia) Vardar)

Out: Note: Flags indicate national team as defined under FIFA eligibility rules; some limited exceptions apply. Players may hold more than one non-FIFA nationality.

No.	Pos.	Nation	Player
3	MF	CMR	Joseph Nane (to (Kazakhstan) Atyrau)
4	DF	UKR	Oleksandr Volovyk (to (Kazakhstan) Akzhayik)
7	MF	KAZ	Bauyrzhan Baitana (to (Kazakhstan) Taraz)
14	DF	KAZ	Berik Aitbayev (to (Kazakhstan) Irtysh Pavlodar)
18	MF	AUT	Tomáš Šimkovič (to (Lithuania) Žalgiris)
22	MF	KAZ	Kirill Shestakov (from (Kazakhstan) Irtysh Pavlodar)
30	DF	SVK	Kristián Kolčák (to (Hungary) Szombathelyi Haladás)
31	MF	KAZ	Abay Zhunusov (loan return to (Kazakhstan) Astana)
32	GK	KAZ	Samat Otarbayev (to (Kazakhstan) Atyrau)
35	DF	FRA	Jérémy Faug-Porret
45	DF	SRB	Slobodan Simović (to (Belarus) BATE Borisov)
50	FW	MKD	Dušan Savić (to (Serbia) Zemun)
66	MF	KAZ	Rakhimzhan Rozybakiev (to (Kazakhstan) Irtysh Pavlodar)
77	MF	MKD	Muarem Muarem (to (Albania) Flamurtari Vlorë)
80	MF	KAZ	Anton Skvortsov
86	FW	MNE	Marko Obradović (to (Russia) Yenisey Krasnoyarsk)
87	FW	BLR	Ihar Zyankovich (to (Kazakhstan) Atyrau)
—	MF	GEO	Jaba Jighauri (loan to (Kazakhstan) Ordabasy)

Trial: Note: Flags indicate national team as defined under FIFA eligibility rules; some limited exceptions apply. Players may hold more than one non-FIFA nationality.

No.	Pos.	Nation	Player
—	DF	BRA	Anderson Santana
—	DF	NGR	Dele Adeleye
—	MF	SRB	Saša Marjanović
—	FW	BRA	Reynaldo
—	FW	UZB	Alexander Geynrikh

=== Summer ===
In: Note: Flags indicate national team as defined under FIFA eligibility rules; some limited exceptions apply. Players may hold more than one non-FIFA nationality.

No.	Pos.	Nation	Player

Out: Note: Flags indicate national team as defined under FIFA eligibility rules; some limited exceptions apply. Players may hold more than one non-FIFA nationality.

No.	Pos.	Nation	Player
6	DF	BRA	Fabrício (to (Brazil) Guarani)
14	MF	KAZ	Igor Yurin (to (Kazakhstan) Shakhter Karagandy)
73	MF	KAZ	Didar Zhalmukan (loan return to (Kazakhstan) Astana)
—	MF	GEO	Jaba Jighauri (to (France) GF38, previously on loan to (Kazakhstan) Ordabasy)

== Friendlies ==
4 February 2018	Aktobe (Kazakhstan)	0 – 2	(Bosnia and Herzegovina) Sloboda Tuzla	Belek, Turkey
19:30 (UTC+6)		Report	Goal

7 February 2018	Aktobe (Kazakhstan)	2 – 0	(Georgia (country)) Torpedo Kutaisi	Belek, Turkey
19:30 (UTC+6)	(o.g.); Aimbetov	Report

10 February 2018	Aktobe (Kazakhstan)	1 – 1	(Hungary) Diósgyőri VTK	Belek, Turkey
19:00 (UTC+6)	Miličević	Report	Goal

13 February 2018	Aktobe (Kazakhstan)	3 – 2	(Georgia (country)) Shukura Kobuleti	Belek, Turkey
19:00 (UTC+6)	Pizzelli; Marjanović; Aimbetov	Report	Goal

23 February 2018	Aktobe (Kazakhstan)	0 – 4	(Russia) FC Tosno	Belek, Turkey
19:00 (UTC+6)		Report	Paliyenko 2', 20'; Melkadze 27', 70'

== Competitions ==
=== Premier League ===
==== Results summary ====
Overall								Home						Away					
Pld	W	D	L	GF	GA	GD	Pts	W	D	L	GF	GA	GD	W	D	L	GF	GA	GD
33	13	9	11	51	47	+4	48	9	4	4	33	19	+14	4	5	7	18	28	−10

Last updated: 21 October 2018.
Source: See Results

==== Results by round ====
Round	1	2	3	4	5	6	7	8	9	10	11	12	13	14	15	16	17	18	19	20	21	22	23	24	25	26	27	28	29	30	31	32	33
Ground	A	A	H	A	H	A	H	A	H	H	A	H	A	H	A	H	A	H	A	A	H	H	A	H	A	H	H	A	H	A	H	A	H
Result	W	L	D	L	L	D	W	D	D	W	L	D	L	W	W	W	L	W	W	D	D	W	D	L	D	W	W	L	L	W	W	L	L
Position	5	5	6	7	8	9	12	12	12	11	12	10	12	11	10	6	10	7	5	6	6	5	5	6	6	6	5	5	6	4	4	5	7

Source: See Results
A = Away; H = Home; W = Win; D = Draw; L = Loss

==== Results ====
11 March 2018 1	Kaisar	0 – 1	Aktobe	Kyzylorda
15:00 (UTC+6)	Djédjé (yellow card) 43'; Tagybergen (yellow card) 66'; Arquin (yellow card) 82'	Report	B.Kairov (yellow card) 64'; S.Adilzhanov (yellow card) 70'; A.Kakimov (yellow card) 73' (goal) 75' (pen.)	Stadium: Gani Muratbayev Stadium; Attendance: 3,000; Referee: Aleksandr Gauzer

17 March 2018 2	Irtysh Pavlodar	2 – 1	Aktobe	Pavlodar
15:00 (UTC+6)	I.Kalinin 16'; Salami 35' (pen.) (yellow card) 73'	Report	A.Kakimov 6' (pen.); S.Zhumagali (yellow card) 78'; R.Temirkhan (yellow card) 90+2'	Stadium: Central Stadium; Attendance: 3,500; Referee: Artyom Kuchin

31 March 2018 3	Aktobe	1 – 1	Kairat	Shymkent
15:00 (UTC+6)	Bateau 11' (o.g.)	Report	Isael 18'; Kuat (yellow card) 34'; A.Sokolenko (yellow card) 67'; Elek (yellow card) 73'	Stadium: Kazhymukan Munaitpasov Stadium; Attendance: 1,500; Referee: Igor Aleshin

7 April 2018 4	Ordabasy	3 – 1	Aktobe	Shymkent
17:00 (UTC+6)	T.Erlanov 14'; Dosmagambetov 17'; Nagaev 66'	Report	B.Kairov (yellow card) 37'; Miličević 44'	Stadium: Kazhymukan Munaitpasov Stadium; Attendance: 3,500; Referee: Marat Iskakov

14 April 2018 5	Aktobe	0 – 1	Tobol	Shymkent
17:00 (UTC+6)	Simčević (yellow card) 55'; A.Kakimov (yellow card) 78'	Report	Shynder 6'; Fedin (yellow card) 32'	Stadium: Kazhymukan Munaitpasov Stadium; Attendance: 900; Referee: Denis Izmailov

22 April 2018 6	Shakhter Karagandy	1 – 1	Aktobe	Temirtau
16:00 (UTC+6)	Subotić (yellow card) 51'; Valadzko (yellow card) 74'; Omirtayev 78'	Report	A.Kakimov 36'; Radin (yellow card) 63'; Z.Kukeyev (yellow card) 74'	Stadium: Metallurg Stadium; Attendance: 1,500; Referee: Saken Bayimbet

29 April 2018 7	Aktobe	2 – 0	Kyzylzhar	Aktobe
17:00 (UTC+6)	B.Kairov (yellow card) 25'; Aimbetov 31'; R.Nurmukhametov (yellow card) 72'; Radin (yellow card) 74' (goal) 82'	Report	T.Muldinov (yellow card) 36'; V.Gunchenko (yellow card) 38'; Popkhadze (yellow card) 76'	Stadium: Central Stadium; Attendance: 11,000; Referee: Furkat Atajanov

5 May 2018 8	Atyrau	1 – 1	Aktobe	Atyrau
17:30 (UTC+6)	Sergienko (yellow card) 14'; R.Aslan (yellow card) 29'; K.Kalmuratov (yellow card) 63'; Sikimić 84'	Report	Fabrício (yellow card) 31'; Marjanović 37'	Stadium: Tomarly Stadion; Attendance: 1,000; Referee: Aleksei Bobrov

9 May 2018 9	Aktobe	1 – 1	Zhetysu	Aktobe
19:00 (UTC+6)	Aimbetov (yellow card) 17'; Marjanović 40'; Pizzelli (yellow card) 63'; A.Kakimov (yellow card) 71'; Fabrício (yellow card) 90+4'	Report	Bojović 48'	Stadium: Central Stadium; Attendance: 11,000; Referee: Arman Ismuratov

13 May 2018 10	Aktobe	5 – 3	Akzhayik	Aktobe
19:00 (UTC+6)	B.Kairov 27'; Pizzelli 42', 67'; Reynaldo 45', 56'	Report	Khudobyak (yellow card) 3'; Eseola (yellow card) 67' (goal) 75'; Basov 73'; Mané 79'	Stadium: Central Stadium; Attendance: 11,000; Referee: Marat Iskakov

19 May 2018 11	Astana	3 – 1	Aktobe	Astana
17:00 (UTC+6)	Despotović 1'; Tomasov 7'; Mayewski (yellow card) 44'; Shomko 68'	Report	Reynaldo 17' (yellow card) 48'	Stadium: Astana Arena; Attendance: 7,000; Referee: Askhat Abdanbayev

27 May 2018 12	Aktobe	1 – 1	Irtysh Pavlodar	Aktobe
20:00 (UTC+6)	Pizzelli 35'; Marjanović (yellow card) 36'; A.Shurigin (yellow card) 45'	Report	Salami 24'; Shabalin (yellow card) 34'; V.Vomenko (yellow card) 43'; Adri (yellow card) 55'	Stadium: Central Stadium; Attendance: 9,000; Referee: Aleksandr Aliyev

31 May 2018 13	Kairat	3 – 2	Aktobe	Almaty
19:00 (UTC+6)	Islamkhan 3'; Suyumbayev (yellow card) 14'; Iličević 77'; Isael (yellow card) 81'; Silveira 89'	Report	Pizzelli 15', 30'; Reynaldo (yellow card) 73'; R.Nurmukhametov (yellow card) 89'	Stadium: Central Stadium; Attendance: 11,500; Referee: Daniyar Sakhi

17 June 2018 14	Aktobe	3 – 1	Ordabasy	Aktobe
21:00 (UTC+6)	Pizzelli 50'; Valiullin (yellow card) 57'; Reynaldo 63'; Radin 73'; Z.Kukeyev (yellow card) 74'; Simčević (yellow card) 74'	Report	D.Dautov (yellow card) 34'; Jighauri 44'; Fontanello (yellow card) 49'; Bertoglio (yellow card) 74'	Stadium: Central Stadium; Attendance: 9,500; Referee: Sergey Gorokhovodatskiy

23 June 2018 15	Tobol	2 – 3	Aktobe	Kostanay
18:00 (UTC+6)	Kankava (yellow card) 17'; Šikov (yellow card) 42'; Turysbek (yellow card) 55'; Nurgaliev (yellow card) 63' (goal) 76' (pen.), 85' (pen.); Miroshnichenko (red card) 81'	Report	Pizzelli 42', 60', 82' (pen.) (yellow card) 44'; Marjanović (yellow card) 65'	Stadium: Central Stadium; Attendance: 2,500; Referee: Igor Aleshin

1 July 2018 16	Aktobe	2 – 0	Shakhter Karagandy	Aktobe
21:00 (UTC+6)	Pizzelli 7', 52'; R.Nurmukhametov (yellow card) 32'; Simčević (red card) 64'; B.Kairov (yellow card) 78'	Report	Valadzko (yellow card) 51'; Tkachuk (yellow card) 58'; V.Tarasov (yellow card) 62'; Mihunov (yellow card) 79'	Stadium: Central Stadium; Attendance: 10,500; Referee: Furkat Atajanov

7 July 2018 17	Kyzylzhar	2 – 1	Aktobe	Petropavl
17:00 (UTC+6)	T.Muldinov (yellow card) 54'; Ceesay 65'; Coronel (yellow card) 66' (goal) 74'; Delić (yellow card) 69'; Popkhadze (yellow card) 81'	Report	Miličević (yellow card) 27'; Pizzelli 44' (pen.); D.Zhalmukan (yellow card) 82'	Stadium: Avangard Stadium; Attendance: 4,000; Referee: Georgiy Chekhovskiy

14 July 2018 18	Aktobe	5 – 1	Atyrau	Aktobe
21:00 (UTC+6)	Z.Kukeyev 27'; A.Shurigin (yellow card) 30'; Radin 60', 82'; Pizzelli 65', 79'	Report	A.Saparov (yellow card) 17'; A.Nurybekov (yellow card) 26'; Maksimović (yellow card) 69'; Barbarić (yellow card) 75'; Sikimić 83'; Khairullin (yellow card) 90+3'	Stadium: Central Stadium; Attendance: 7,500; Referee: Aleksandr Aliyev

21 July 2018 19	Zhetysu	1 – 2	Aktobe	Taldıqorğan
18:00 (UTC+6)	O.Kerimzhanov (yellow card) 28'; Mukhutdinov (yellow card) 38'; R.Jalilov 65'; Ibraev (yellow card) 90+1'	Report	B.Kairov 30'; A.Shurigin (yellow card) 44'; Hromțov 82'; Maurice (yellow card) 90+1'	Stadium: Zhetysu Stadium; Attendance: 1,500; Referee: Denis Tevyashov

28 July 2018 20	Akzhayik	1 – 1	Aktobe	Oral
20:00 (UTC+6)	I.Antipov (yellow card) 32'; Glavina (yellow card) 45+2'; E.Tapalov (yellow card) 47'; Tkachuk 86'	Report	A.Shurigin (yellow card) 37'; Maurice (yellow card) 41' (goal) 43'	Stadium: Petr Atoyan Stadium; Attendance: 3,500; Referee: Aydin Rakhimbayev

4 August 2018 21	Aktobe	1 – 1	Astana	Aktobe
21:00 (UTC+6)	Simčević 54'; Marjanović (yellow card) 57'; Pizzelli (yellow card) 73'	Report	Beisebekov (yellow card) 27'; S.Sagnayev (yellow card) 34'; Janga 36'	Stadium: Central Stadium; Attendance: 12,800; Referee: Saken Bayimbet

11 August 2018 22	Aktobe	3 – 1	Kaisar	Aktobe
21:00 (UTC+6)	Simčević (yellow card) 19' (goal) 68'; Valiullin 71'; R.Nurmukhametov (yellow card) 74'; Z.Kukeyev 90+7'	Report	Tagybergen (yellow card) 19' (yellow-red card) 76' (goal) 75' (pen.); Korobkin (yellow card) 76'; Graf (yellow card) 90'	Stadium: Central Stadium; Attendance: 11,500; Referee: Anatolyi Vishnichenko

18 August 2018 23	Akzhayik	0 – 0	Aktobe	Oral
19:00 (UTC+6)	Basov (yellow card) 74'; Khudobyak (yellow card) 79'; M.Sapanov (yellow card) 79'; Nurgaliyev (yellow card) 90+3'	Report	Maurice (yellow card) 90+3'	Stadium: Petr Atoyan Stadium; Attendance: 1,500; Referee: Artyom Kuchin

25 August 2018 24	Aktobe	2 – 3	Zhetysu	Aktobe
21:00 (UTC+6)	Valiullin (yellow card) 50'; A.Shurigin (yellow card) 61'; Pizzelli 76'; Reynaldo 85' (yellow card) 85'; Simčević (yellow card) 90+4'; Z.Kukeyev (yellow card) 90+4'	Report	Stepanyuk 28', 61'; Ibraev (yellow card) 43' (yellow-red card) 56'; E.Altynbekov 86'; Bekbaev (yellow card) 90+3'; Kharabara (yellow card) 90+4'	Stadium: Central Stadium; Attendance: 9,000; Referee: Bolat Saryev

16 September 2018 26	Ordabasy	0 – 0	Aktobe	Shymkent
20:00 (UTC+6)		Report	Volkov (yellow card) 29'; Radin (yellow card) 58'; Z.Kukeyev (yellow card) 71'	Stadium: Kazhymukan Munaitpasov Stadium; Attendance: 3,000; Referee: Aleksandr Gauzer

22 September 2018 27	Aktobe	3 – 1	Tobol	Aktobe
20:00 (UTC+6)	Radin (yellow card) 45'; Pizzelli 60', 90+3'; Marjanović 79'	Report	Kankava (yellow card) 30'; Turysbek 50'; Miroshnichenko (yellow card) 81'	Stadium: Central Stadium; Attendance: 8,000; Referee: Denis Izmailov

26 September 2018 25	Aktobe	2 – 0	Irtysh Pavlodar	Aktobe
20:00 (UTC+6)	Pizzelli 24'; S.Zhumagali (yellow card) 33'; A.Shurigin (yellow card) 49'; Reynaldo 66'; Valiullin (yellow card) 82'	Report	Shabalin (yellow card) 61'	Stadium: Central Stadium; Attendance: 8,000; Referee: Igor Chesnokov

30 September 2018 28	Kairat	6 – 1	Aktobe	Almaty
17:00 (UTC+6)	Paragulgov 10'; Zhukov 16'; Isael 25', 71'; Bateau (yellow card) 35'; Eseola 50'; Eppel 62'	Report	Aimbetov 66'	Stadium: Central Stadium; Attendance: 7,500; Referee: Artyom Kuchin

7 October 2018 29	Aktobe	1 – 2	Astana	Aktobe
19:00 (UTC+6)	S.Zhumagali 55'; A.Kakimov (yellow card) 58'	Report	Janga 42'; Murtazayev (yellow card) 54'; Malyi (yellow card) 60'; Muzhikov 62'	Stadium: Central Stadium; Attendance: 11,000; Referee: Denis Tevyashov

21 October 2018 30	Shakhter Karagandy	0 – 1	Aktobe	Karaganda
15:00 (UTC+6)	Droppa (yellow card) 19'; Shakhmetov (yellow card) 24'; Yurin (yellow card) 39'	Report	Miličević 19' (pen.); Volkov (yellow card) 49'	Stadium: Shakhter Stadium; Attendance: 1,000; Referee: Aydin Rakhimbayev

27 October 2018 31	Aktobe	1 – 0	Kyzylzhar	Aktobe
17:00 (UTC+6)	Reynaldo 20'; Valiullin (yellow card) 62'; Radin (yellow card) 77'	Report	B.Kozhabayev (yellow card) 66'; Delić (yellow card) 82'	Stadium: Central Stadium; Attendance: 7,000; Referee: Anatolyi Vishnichenko

3 November 2018 32	Atyrau	3 – 1	Aktobe	Atyrau
15:00 (UTC+6)	Sikimić 16', 58'; Ablitarov (yellow card) 53'; K.Kalmuratov 65'	Report	Pertsukh 21' (o.g.); B.Kairov (yellow card) 47'; A.Shurigin (yellow card) 57'; S.Zhumagali (yellow card) 79'	Stadium: Munaishy Stadium; Attendance: 3,000; Referee: Georgiy Chekhovskiy

11 November 2018 33	Aktobe	0 – 2	Kaisar	Aktobe
15:00 (UTC+6)	Aimbetov (yellow card) 20'; Radin (yellow card) 43'; Simčević (yellow card) 52'; S.Zhumagali (yellow card) 67'	Report	Zyankovich 17', 35'; Narzildaev (yellow card) 27'; I.Amirseitov (yellow card) 55'; Tagybergen (yellow card) 58'; Graf (yellow card) 78'; M.Islamkulov (yellow card) 87'	Stadium: Central Stadium; Attendance: 11,000; Referee: Aleksandr Gauzer

==== League table ====
Pos	Team	Pld	W	D	L	GF	GA	GD	Pts
5	Kaisar	33	11	12	10	35	31	+4	45
6	Zhetysu	33	11	10	12	36	40	−4	43
7	Aktobe (Note: Aktobe had six points deducted on 27 April 2018 as a punishment for unpaid debts to former player Danilo Neco.)	33	13	9	11	51	47	+4	42
8	Shakhter Karagandy	33	8	12	13	29	36	−7	36
9	Atyrau	33	9	9	15	34	47	−13	36

Source: UEFA, Soccerway
Rules for classification: 1) Points; 2) Goal difference; 3) Matches won; 4) Goals scored; 5) Away goals scored; 6) Head-to-head points; 7) Head-to-head matches won; 8) Head-to-head goal difference; 9) Head-to-head goals scored; 10) Head-to-head away goals scored; 11) Draw.

=== Kazakhstan Cup ===
18 April 2018 Last 16	Kaisar	2 – 0	Aktobe	Kyzylorda
16:00 (UTC+6)	Korobkin 13'; Baizhanov (yellow card) 27'; Zhangylyshbay 34'; I.Amirseitov (yellow card) 71'; Marochkin (yellow card) 83'	Report	Valiullin (yellow card) 20'; Miličević (yellow card) 90'	Stadium: Gani Muratbayev Stadium; Attendance: 2,500; Referee: Sergey Gorokhovodetsky

== Squad statistics ==
As of match played 11 November 2018

=== Appearances and goals ===
No.	Pos	Nat	Player	Total		Premier League		Kazakhstan Cup	
No.	Pos	Nat	Player	Apps	Goals	Apps	Goals	Apps	Goals
2	DF	(Kazakhstan) KAZ	Adilkhan Tanzharikov	2	0	1+1	0	0	0
5	DF	(Kazakhstan) KAZ	Bagdat Kairov	32	2	31	2	1	0
9	MF	(Kazakhstan) KAZ	Ruslan Valiullin	30	1	21+8	1	1	0
10	FW	(Armenia) ARM	Marcos Pizzelli	25	18	22+2	18	0+1	0
11	MF	(Serbia) SRB	Saša Marjanović	24	3	20+3	3	1	0
13	GK	(Kazakhstan) KAZ	Ramil Nurmukhametov	18	0	18	0	0	0
17	MF	(Kazakhstan) KAZ	Ulan Konysbayev	12	0	3+9	0	0	0
19	MF	(Kazakhstan) KAZ	Ardak Saulet	8	0	6+1	0	1	0
21	FW	(Haiti) HAI	Jean-Eudes Maurice	15	1	8+6	1	1	0
22	DF	(Russia) RUS	Vitali Volkov	24	0	24	0	0	0
23	MF	(Croatia) CRO	Hrvoje Miličević	32	2	30+1	2	1	0
24	DF	(Serbia) SRB	Milan Radin	30	4	26+3	4	1	0
25	DF	(Kazakhstan) KAZ	Sayat Zhumagali	19	1	15+3	1	1	0
38	DF	(Kazakhstan) KAZ	Ayber Temirbayev	1	0	0+1	0	0	0
39	MF	(Kazakhstan) KAZ	Rustam Temirkhan	3	0	2+1	0	0	0
42	GK	(Kazakhstan) KAZ	Igor Trofimets	16	0	15	0	1	0
47	MF	(Kazakhstan) KAZ	Aslanbek Kakimov	16	3	11+4	3	0+1	0
50	FW	(Brazil) BRA	Reynaldo	31	7	22+8	7	0+1	0
51	MF	(Kazakhstan) KAZ	Igor Boychuk	2	0	0+2	0	0	0
59	MF	(Kazakhstan) KAZ	Alexandr Ussachev	1	0	1	0	0	0
71	MF	(Kazakhstan) KAZ	Syrym Adilzhanov	2	0	2	0	0	0
77	MF	(Kazakhstan) KAZ	Zhambyl Kukeyev	25	2	17+8	2	0	0
84	FW	(Kazakhstan) KAZ	Adilkhan Zhumay	1	0	0+1	0	0	0
87	DF	(Serbia) SRB	Aleksandar Simčević	29	2	28	2	1	0
88	MF	(Kazakhstan) KAZ	Anton Shurigin	27	0	19+8	0	0	0
95	FW	(Kazakhstan) KAZ	Abat Aimbetov	23	2	12+11	2	0	0
Players away from Aktobe on loan:
Players who left Aktobe during the season:
6	DF	(Brazil) BRA	Fabrício	9	0	8+1	0	0	0
14	MF	(Kazakhstan) KAZ	Igor Yurin	6	0	1+4	0	1	0
73	MF	(Kazakhstan) KAZ	Didar Zhalmukan	4	0	0+4	0	0	0

=== Goal scorers ===
Place	Position	Nation	Number	Name	Premier League	Kazakhstan Cup	Total
1	FW	(Armenia)	10	Marcos Pizzelli	18	0	18
2	FW	(Brazil)	50	Reynaldo	7	0	7
3	DF	(Serbia)	24	Milan Radin	4	0	4
4	MF	(Kazakhstan)	47	Aslanbek Kakimov	3	0	3
4	MF	(Serbia)	11	Saša Marjanović	3	0	3
4				Own goal	3	0	3
7	DF	(Kazakhstan)	5	Bagdat Kairov	2	0	2
7	MF	(Kazakhstan)	77	Zhambyl Kukeyev	2	0	2
7	DF	(Serbia)	87	Aleksandar Simčević	2	0	2
7	FW	(Kazakhstan)	95	Abat Aimbetov	2	0	2
7	MF	(Croatia)	23	Hrvoje Miličević	2	0	2
12	FW	(Haiti)	21	Jean-Eudes Maurice	1	0	1
12	MF	(Kazakhstan)	9	Ruslan Valiullin	1	0	1
12	DF	(Kazakhstan)	25	Sayat Zhumagali	1	0	1
				TOTALS	51	0	51

=== Disciplinary record ===
Number	Nation	Position	Name	Premier League		Kazakhstan Cup		Total	
Number	Nation	Position	Name	Yellow card	Red card	Yellow card	Red card	Yellow card	Red card
5	(Kazakhstan)	DF	Bagdat Kairov	5	0	0	0	5	0
9	(Kazakhstan)	MF	Ruslan Valiullin	4	0	1	0	5	0
10	(Armenia)	FW	Marcos Pizzelli	3	0	0	0	3	0
11	(Serbia)	MF	Saša Marjanović	3	0	0	0	3	0
13	(Kazakhstan)	GK	Ramil Nurmukhametov	4	0	0	0	4	0
21	(Haiti)	FW	Jean-Eudes Maurice	3	0	0	0	3	0
22	(Russia)	DF	Vitali Volkov	2	0	0	0	2	0
23	(Croatia)	MF	Hrvoje Miličević	1	0	1	0	2	0
24	(Serbia)	DF	Milan Radin	6	0	0	0	6	0
25	(Kazakhstan)	DF	Sayat Zhumagali	4	0	0	0	4	0
39	(Kazakhstan)	MF	Rustam Temirkhan	1	0	0	0	1	0
47	(Kazakhstan)	MF	Aslanbek Kakimov	4	0	0	0	4	0
50	(Brazil)	FW	Reynaldo	3	0	0	0	3	0
71	(Kazakhstan)	MF	Syrym Adilzhanov	1	0	0	0	1	0
77	(Kazakhstan)	MF	Zhambyl Kukeyev	4	0	0	0	4	0
87	(Serbia)	DF	Aleksandar Simčević	5	1	0	0	5	1
88	(Kazakhstan)	MF	Anton Shurigin	7	0	0	0	7	0
95	(Kazakhstan)	FW	Abat Aimbetov	2	0	0	0	2	0
Players who left Aktobe during the season:
6	(Brazil)	DF	Fabrício	2	0	0	0	2	0
73	(Kazakhstan)	MF	Didar Zhalmukan	1	0	0	0	1	0
			TOTALS	65	1	2	0	67	1
