= Sekou Keita Souza =

Guinean footballer

Sekou Keita
Personal information
- Full name: Sékou Keita Souza
- Date of birth: 12 December 1994 (age 31)
- Place of birth: Conakry, Guinea
- Height: 1.80 m (5 ft 11 in)
- Position: Forward

Team information
- Current team: Le Grau-du-Roi

Youth career
- Pas Mal
- Hafia
- 2011: Alcobendas
- 2012–2013: Atlético Madrid

Senior career*
| Years | Team | Apps | (Gls) |
| 2011 | Horoya | | |
| 2011–2012 | Alcobendas | 15 | (7) |
| 2013–2014 | Atlético Madrid C | 34 | (8) |
| 2014–2016 | Atlético Madrid B | 22 | (4) |
| 2015–2016 | → Evian (loan) | 24 | (6) |
| 2016–2018 | Red Star | 41 | (9) |
| 2018–2019 | Ermis Aradippou | 9 | (1) |
| 2019 | Laval | 11 | (5) |
| 2019–2020 | Cholet | 13 | (4) |
| 2020 | Dudelange | 4 | (3) |
| 2020 | Al-Arabi | | |
| 2021 | Dinamo Tbilisi | 6 | (0) |
| 2021–2022 | Voždovac | 18 | (0) |
| 2023–2024 | Aigues Mortes | 1 | (0) |
| 2024– | Le Grau-du-Roi | | |

International career^{‡}
| 2015– | Guinea | 7 | (0) |
- * Club domestic league appearances and goals ‡ National team caps and goals as of 29 September 2021

Sekou Keita Souza (born 12 December 1994) is a Guinean professional footballer who plays as a forward for Le Grau-du-Roi.

== Club career ==
Born in Conakry, Keita made his senior debut in Spain with Alcobendas CF in 2011, in Tercera División. In 2012, he moved to Atlético Madrid, returning to youth football, and was promoted to the C-team in the summer of 2013.

In June 2014, after appearing regularly, Keita moved to the reserves in Segunda División B. On 18 December he made his first team debut, coming on as a late substitute for goalscorer Mario Mandžukić in a 2–2 home draw against CE L'Hospitalet, for the season's Copa del Rey.

On 7 July 2015, Keita was loaned to Ligue 2 side Evian Thonon Gaillard for one year. After this he remained in France, signing a three-year contract with fellow Ligue 2 side Red Star.

After six month with Ermis Aradippou, in January 2019 he returned in France with Laval. In February 2020, he moved to F91 Dudelange in Luxembourg.

In September 2021, he signed with Serbian club Voždovac.

== International career ==
On 5 June 2015, Keita was called up to Guinea national team for a 2017 Africa Cup of Nations qualification match against Swaziland. He made his full international debut seven days later, starting in the 2–1 defeat.
