= Giorgi Gabedava =

Georgian footballer

Personal information
- Date of birth: 3 October 1989 (age 37)
- Place of birth: Tbilisi, Georgian SSR, Soviet Union
- Height: 1.82 m (5 ft 11 1/2 in)
- Position: Forward

Team information
- Current team: Odishi 1919
- Number: 9

Senior career*
Years	Team	Apps	(Gls)
2005–2007	Mglebi Zugdidi	58	(12)
2008	Metalurgi Rustavi	10	(1)
2008–2013	Gagra	58	(18)
2010	→ Illichivets Mariupol (loan)	17	(1)
2012–2013	→ Baia Zugdidi (loan)	42	(9)
2013–2014	Chikhura Sachkhere	29	(11)
2014–2015	Samtredia	20	(2)
2015–2016	Dinamo Batumi	11	(3)
2016–2019	Chikhura Sachkhere	64	(29)
2019	Zagłębie Sosnowiec	14	(3)
2019–2020	Saburtalo Tbilisi	19	(7)
2020–2022	Dinamo Tbilisi	60	(20)
2023	Hapoel Acre	17	(3)
2024	Rustavi	31	(15)
2025	Gagra	10	(0)
2026–	Odishi 1919	0	(0)

International career
2009	Georgia U21	3	(0)
- * Club domestic league appearances and goals as of 26 July 2026

Giorgi Gabedava (born 3 October 1989) is a Georgian professional footballer who plays as a forward for Erovnuli Liga 2 club Odishi 1919.

He has played in four countries and won eight titles in all competitions in Georgia. Individually, with 22 goals scored for Chikhura in the 2018 season, Gabedava shared a goalscorer's prize with Budu Zivzivadze. He has also been named as Player of the Year and Forward of the Year.

== Career ==
Gabedava started his youth career at Odishi Zugdidi. At the age of 17, he made a debut for Mglebi Zugdidi. In early 2008, Gabedava joined Olimpi Rustavi, one of the strongest domestic teams of the time.

The Georgian Cup was the first trophy Gabedava lifted during his career. In 2011, he helped Gagra secure an extra-time win over Torpedo and qualify for UEFA Europa League. On 21 July 2011, he scored his first international goal in a 2–0 win against Anorthosis.

In the summer of 2013, Gabedava signed with Chikhura. Out of five seasons spent at this club, Gabedava especially shone in 2018. He was awarded the Player of the Year and Forward of the Year titles and named among best eleven players of the season.

On 19 July 2018, his goal from the penalty spot ensured Chikhura's away victory over Israeli club Beitar in UEFA Europa League qualifiers.

Following this season, Gabedava moved to Poland in a 1,5-year deal with Zagłębie Sosnowiec, but returned home following the latter's relegation from the top division. The defending Georgian champions Saburtalo became his next club where during the next two seasons he won the national cup and Super Cup.

In 2020, Gabedava became a winner of the national league for the first time with Dinamo Tbilisi, followed by another top title two years later.

In February 2023, Israeli club Hapoel Acre announced signing Gabedava until the end of the season. After taking part in two league matches of the new season in October, the player opted to leave the club citing safety reasons.

In March 2024, Gabedava joined Erovnuli Liga 2 side Rustavi and at the end of the season became its topscorer with 15 goals.

A year later Gabedava moved to top-tier club Gagra. In the summer of 2026, he signed with 2nd division side Odishi 1919, making his debut as a substitute in a 2–1 away cup win over Merani Martvili on 26 July.

=== Career statistics ===
As of match played 26 July 2026

Detailed data is available from 2009

Appearances and goals by club, season and competition
Club	Season	League			National cup		Continental		Other		Total	
Club	Season	Division	Apps	Goals	Apps	Goals	Apps	Goals	Apps	Goals	Apps	Goals
Gagra	2009–10	Umaglesi Liga	19	10	2	3	—		—		21	13
Gagra	2010–11	Pirveli Liga	0	0	2	0	—		—		2	0
Gagra	2011–12	Umaglesi Liga	11	0	3	0	2 (Note: Appearance(s) in UEFA Europa League)	1	—		16	1
Gagra	Total		30	10	7	3	2	1	0	0	39	14
Illichivets Mariupol (loan)	2009–10	Ukrainian Premier League	13	1	—		—		—		13	1
Illichivets Mariupol (loan)	2010–11	Ukrainian Premier League	4	0	1	0	—		—		5	0
Illichivets Mariupol (loan)	Total		17	1	1	0	0	0	0	0	18	1
Baia/Dinamo Zugdidi (loan)	2011–12	Umaglesi Liga	16	3	—		—		—		16	3
Baia/Dinamo Zugdidi (loan)	2012–13	Umaglesi Liga	26	6	4	0	—		—		30	6
Baia/Dinamo Zugdidi (loan)	Total		42	9	4	0	0	0	0	0	46	9
Chikhura	2013–14	Umaglesi Liga	29	11	6	2	—		1 (Note: Appearance in Georgian Super Cup)	0	36	13
Chikhura	2014–15	Umaglesi Liga	—		—		6	4	—		6	4
Chikhura	Total		29	11	6	2	6	4	1	0	42	7
Samtredia	2014–15	Umaglesi Liga	20	2	5	1	—		—		25	3
Dinamo Batumi	2015–16	Umaglesi Liga	11	3	—		2	1	—		13	4
Chikhura	2016	Umaglesi Liga	10	1	2	0	1	0	—		13	1
Chikhura	2017	Erovnuli Liga	19	6	4	1	1	0	1	0	25	7
Chikhura	2018	Erovnuli Liga	35	22	1	0	4	1	—		40	23
Chikhura	Total		64	29	7	1	6	1	1	0	78	31
Zagłębie Sosnowiec	2018–19	Ekstraklasa	14	3	—		—		—		14	3
Saburtalo	2019	Erovnuli Liga	17	6	3	1	6 (Note: Four appearances in UEFA Champions League, two appearances in UEFA Europa League)	0	—		26	7
Saburtalo	2020	Erovnuli Liga	2	1	—		—		1	0	3	1
Saburtalo	Total		19	7	3	1	6	0	1	0	29	8
Dinamo Tbilisi	2020	Erovnuli Liga	9	4	—		3 (Note: One appearance in UEFA Champions League, two appearances in UEFA Europa Conference League)	1	—		12	5
Dinamo Tbilisi	2021	Erovnuli Liga	26	10	—		4 (Note: Two appearances in UEFA Champions League, two appearances in UEFA Europa Conference League)	0	1	1	33	11
Dinamo Tbilisi	2022	Erovnuli Liga	25	6	2	0	1 (Note: Appearance(s) in UEFA Europa Conference League)	0	—		28	6
Dinamo Tbilisi	Total		60	20	2	0	8	1	1	1	71	22
Hapoel Acre	2022–23	Liga Leumit	15	3	–		—		—		15	3
Hapoel Acre	2023–24	Liga Leumit	2	0	–		—		—		2	0
Hapoel Acre	Total		17	3	0	0	0	0	0	0	17	3
Rustavi	2024	Erovnuli Liga 2	31	15	1	0	—		2 (Note: Appearances in Liga 1/2 play-offs)	0	34	14
Gagra	2025	Erovnuli Liga	10	0	0	0	—		—		10	0
Odishi 1919	2026	Erovnuli Liga 2	0	0	1	0	—		—		1	0
Career total			364	113	37	8	30	8	6	1	437	129

== Personal life ==
Gabedava is married with two daughters, Anastasia and Alexandra.

== Honours ==
Gagra

- David Kipiani Cup: 2010–11

Chikhura Sachkhere

- David Kipiani Cup: 2017
- Georgian Super Cup: 2013

Saburtalo

- David Kipiani Cup: 2019
- Georgian Super Cup: 2020

Dinamo Tbilisi

- Erovnuli Liga: 2020, 2022
- Georgian Super Cup: 2021

Individual

- Erovnuli Liga top scorer: 2018
- Erovnuli Liga Player of the Year: 2018
- Erovnuli Liga Forward of the Year: 2018
- Erovnuli Liga Team of the Season: 2018
