= Rafik El Hamdi =

Moroccan footballer (born 1994)

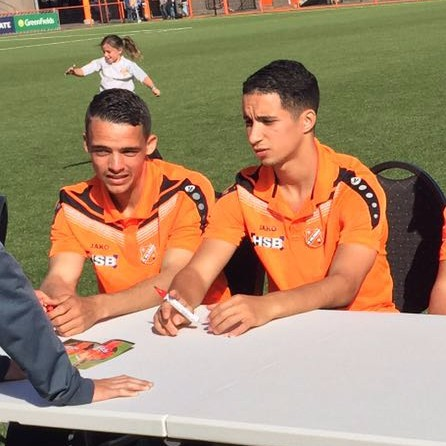
- El Hamdi (right) in 2016 (with Daniël van Son)

Personal information
- Date of birth: 3 January 1994 (age 32)
- Place of birth: Purmerend, Netherlands
- Height: 1.80 m (5 ft 11 in)
- Position: Midfielder

Youth career
- EVC
- Volendam

Senior career*
| Years | Team | Apps | (Gls) |
| 2015–2018 | Volendam | 32 | (1) |
| 2018 | CR Al Hoceima | 2 | (0) |
| 2019–2020 | Eemdijk | 29 | (2) |
| 2020–2022 | VVOG | 29 | (3) |
| 2022–2023 | Sportlust '46 | 1 | (0) |

International career
| 2016 | Morocco U23 | 1 | (0) |
- * Club domestic league appearances and goals as of 22:17, 23 February 2023 (UTC)

Rafik El Hamdi (born 3 January 1994) is a footballer who plays as a midfielder. Born in the Netherlands, he has represented Morocco at youth level.

== Club career ==
El Hamdi signed his first professional contract with Volendam in 2015 and joined CR Al Hoceima in Morocco in July 2018, and played for the club for a half year, before leaving. He then moved back to the Netherlands and joined Derde Divisie club VV Eemdijk. In 2020 he moved to VVOG and in 2022 to Sportlust '46.

== International career ==
El Hamdi was called up and capped for the Morocco U23s in a friendly 1–0 win against the Cameroon U23s.
