= Mehdi Boukassi =

Algerian footballer (born 1996)

Personal information
- Full name: Mohamed El Mehdi Boukassi
- Date of birth: 15 June 1996 (age 30)
- Place of birth: Sidi Bel Abbès, Algeria
- Height: 1.83 m (6 ft 0 in)
- Position: Midfielder

Team information
- Current team: USM Khenchela
- Number: 10

Youth career
- 2007–2009: USM Bel Abbès
- 2009: Paradou AC
- 2009–2011: ASFA Oran
- 2011–2017: Charleroi
- 2017: Roda Kerkrade

Senior career*
Years	Team	Apps	(Gls)
2017–2019	Oliveirense	26	(0)
2019–2020	Cherno More	17	(1)
2021–2022	Torpedo Kutaisi	36	(6)
2022	Al-Quwa Al-Jawiya	7	(1)
2022–2023	Raja CA	0	(0)
2023	→ Haka (loan)	4	(0)
2024	Tadamon Sour	8	(1)
2024–2026	Botev Vratsa	20	(0)
2026	Opava	1	(0)
2026–	USM Khenchela	1	(0)
- * Club domestic league appearances and goals as of 23 August 2026

Mohamed El Mehdi Boukassi (Arabic: محمد المهدي بوكاسي; born 15 June 1996) is an Algerian professional footballer who plays as a midfielder for Algerian Ligue Professionnelle 1 club USM Khenchela.

== Career ==
Boukassi played in Portugal and Bulgaria as well.

In February 2021, Boukassi signed with Torpedo Kutaisi and was presented as a new player of the club.

In March 2023, Boukassi was loaned out to Finnish Veikkausliiga club Haka from Raja CA for the 2023 season. He eventually missed most of the season due to injury.

In January 2024, he joined Tadamon Sour SC in Lebanon.

On 12 January 2026, Boukassi signed a contract with Czech National Football League club Opava until 2027.

On 23 August 2026, he joined Algerian club USM Khenchela.

== Career statistics ==
As of 9 January 2025

Appearances and goals by club, season and competition
Club	Season	League			Cup		Continental		Total	
Club	Season	Division	Apps	Goals	Apps	Goals	Apps	Goals	Apps	Goals
Oliveirense	2017–18	LigaPro	9	0	2	0	–		11	0
Oliveirense	2018–19	LigaPro	15	0	0	0	–		15	0
Oliveirense	Total		24	0	2	0	0	0	26	0
Cherno More	2019–20	Bulgarian First League	10	1	1	0	–		11	1
Cherno More	2020–21	Bulgarian First League	5	0	1	0	–		6	0
Cherno More	Total		15	1	2	0	0	0	17	1
Torpedo Kutaisi	2021	Erovnuli Liga	35	6	1	0	–		36	6
Al-Quwa Al-Jawiya	2021–22	Iraq Stars League	7	1	0	0	4 (Note: Appearances in AFC Champions League)	0	11	1
Raja CA	2022–23	Botola Pro	0	0	0	0	0	0	0	0
Haka (loan)	2023	Veikkausliiga	4	0	0	0	0	0	4	0
Tadamon Sour	2023–24	Lebanese Premier League	8	1	0	0	–		8	1
Botev Vratsa	2024–25	Bulgarian First League	5	0	2	0	–		7	0
Career total			98	9	7	0	4	0	109	9
