= Víctor Mongil =

Spanish footballer

Personal information
- Full name: Víctor Mongil Adeva
- Date of birth: 21 July 1992 (age 34)
- Place of birth: Valladolid, Spain
- Height: 1.85 m (6 ft 1 in)
- Position: Centre-back

Team information
- Current team: Palencia

Youth career
- Valladolid

Senior career*
Years	Team	Apps	(Gls)
2010–2012	Valladolid B	54	(3)
2011–2012	Valladolid	7	(0)
2012–2014	Atlético Madrid B	52	(0)
2014–2016	Alcoyano	50	(0)
2016–2017	Mérida	21	(0)
2017–2018	Pontevedra	7	(1)
2018–2019	Levante B	13	(1)
2019	Dinamo Tbilisi	36	(1)
2020	ATK	9	(0)
2020–2021	Dinamo Tbilisi	23	(0)
2021–2022	Odisha	19	(0)
2022–2023	Kerala Blasters	19	(0)
2025	Atlético Tordesillas	0	(0)
2025–	Palencia	31	(2)

International career
2009	Spain U17	3	(0)
- * Club domestic league appearances and goals as of 20:31, 24 August 2026 (UTC)

Víctor Mongil Adeva (born 21 July 1992) is a Spanish professional footballer who plays as a centre-back for Tercera Federación club Palencia.

== Club career ==
Born in Valladolid, Castile and León, Mongil started his senior career with local club Real Valladolid's reserves in the Tercera División. He went on to make nine competitive appearances for the first team, his Segunda División debut coming on 17 September 2011 in a 3–1 home loss against Real Murcia CF where he played 90 minutes.

For the better part of the next seven seasons, Mongil competed in the Segunda División B, representing Atlético Madrid B, CD Alcoyano, Mérida AD, Pontevedra CF and Atlético Levante UD (with the latter side, he also spent six months in the fourth tier). On 29 January 2019 he moved to the Georgian Erovnuli Liga, signing with FC Dinamo Tbilisi and playing five matches in the 2019–20 UEFA Europa League before being ousted by Feyenoord in the last qualifying round.

On 2 January 2020, Mongil joined ATK of the Indian Super League. He returned to Dinamo shortly after, winning another Erovnuli Liga.

Mongil returned to India and its top tier on 26 July 2021, agreeing to a contract at Odisha FC. One year later, he moved to Kerala Blasters FC of the same league. He made his debut on 7 October, as a last-minute substitute in a 3–1 win against East Bengal FC.

== Career statistics ==
As of 26 August 2026

Club	Season	League			Cup (Note: Includes Copa del Rey, Georgian Cup)		Continental		Other		Total	
Club	Season	Division	Apps	Goals	Apps	Goals	Apps	Goals	Apps	Goals	Apps	Goals
Valladolid B	2010–11	Tercera División	33	3	—		—		—		33	3
Valladolid B	2011–12	Tercera División	21	0	—		—		4 (Note: Appearances in Tercera División play-offs)	0	25	0
Valladolid B	Total		54	3	—		—		4	0	58	3
Valladolid	2011–12	Segunda División	7	0	2	0	—		—		9	0
Atlético Madrid B	2012–13	Segunda División B	24	0	—		—		—		24	0
Atlético Madrid B	2013–14	Segunda División B	28	0	—		—		2 (Note: Appearances in Segunda División B play-offs)	0	30	0
Atlético Madrid B	Total		52	0	—		—		2	0	54	0
Alcoyano	2014–15	Segunda División B	26	0	2	0	—		—		28	0
Alcoyano	2015–16	Segunda División B	24	0	1	1	—		—		25	1
Alcoyano	Total		50	0	3	1	—		—		53	1
Mérida	2016–17	Segunda División B	21	0	0	0	—		—		21	0
Pontevedra	2017–18	Segunda División B	7	1	0	0	—		—		7	1
Atlético Levante	2018–19	Segunda División B	13	0	—		—		—		13	0
Dinamo Tbilisi	2019	Erovnuli Liga	36	1	2	0	5 (Note: Appearances in UEFA Europa League)	0	—		43	1
Dinamo Tbilisi	2020	Erovnuli Liga	4	0	1	0	0	0	—		5	0
Dinamo Tbilisi	2021	Erovnuli Liga	19	0	1	0	0	0	1 (Note: Appearance in Georgian Super Cup)	0	21	0
Dinamo Tbilisi	Total		59	1	4	0	5	0	1	0	69	1
ATK	2019–20	Indian Super League	9	0	0	0	—		—		9	0
Odisha	2021–22	Indian Super League	19	0	0	0	—		—		19	0
Kerala Blasters	2022–23	Indian Super League	19	0	2	0	—		—		21	0
Atlético Tordesillas	2024–25	Tercera Federación	—		—		—		4 (Note: Appearances in Tercera Federación play-offs)	0	4	0
Palencia	2025–26	Tercera Federación	31	2	—		—		4	1	35	3
Career total			341	7	11	1	5	0	15	1	372	9

== Honours ==
Dinamo Tbilisi

- Erovnuli Liga: 2019, 2020

ATK

- Indian Super League: 2019–20
