= Fabian Sporkslede =

Surinamese footballer

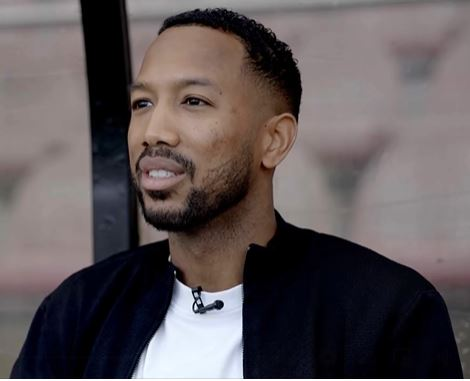
- Fabian Sporkslede

Personal information
- Full name: Fabian Mitchel Sporkslede
- Date of birth: 3 August 1993 (age 33)
- Place of birth: Amstelveen, Netherlands
- Height: 1.78 m (5 ft 10 in)
- Position: Right-back

Team information
- Current team: Ajax Amateurs
- Number: 6

Youth career
- NFC/Brommer
- AFC
- –2007: AZ
- 2007–2012: Ajax

Senior career*
Years	Team	Apps	(Gls)
2012–2015	Ajax	2	(0)
2013–2015	Jong Ajax	24	(2)
2014–2015	→ Willem II (loan)	1	(0)
2016	Chievo Verona	0	(0)
2016	→ Lupa Castelli Romani (loan)	2	(0)
2016–2019	NAC Breda	65	(0)
2019–2020	RKC Waalwijk	6	(0)
2021	Dinamo Tbilisi	30	(2)
2022–2023	Bnei Sakhnin	40	(2)
2024–	Ajax Amateurs	31	(3)

International career
2009–2010	Netherlands U17	5	(1)
2011–2012	Netherlands U19	9	(0)
2013	Netherlands U21	2	(0)
2023	Suriname	1	(0)
- * Club domestic league appearances and goals as of 01:35, 26 January 2026 (UTC)

Fabian Mitchel Sporkslede (born 3 August 1993) is a footballer who plays as a right-back for Ajax Amateurs. Born in the Netherlands, he was capped once for the Suriname national team.

== Club career ==
=== AFC Ajax ===
Sporkslede began his football career in the youth ranks of AZ Alkmaar, where he left to join the youth side of AFC Ajax in 2007. Working his way through the youth ranks of the Amsterdam side, Sporkslede would go on to make his debut for Ajax on 26 September 2012 in an away KNVB Cup match against FC Utrecht, which Ajax won by three goals to nil. Just three days after his debut, he made his regular season debut for Ajax, coming in as an 87th-minute substitute for Ryan Babel, in the 1–0 home win against FC Twente. Four days later, Sporkslede made his international debut for Ajax, coming on as a 69th-minute substitute for Christian Poulsen in the UEFA Champions League group stage match against Real Madrid at home. The match ended in a 1–4 loss for the Amsterdam side.

On 7 October 2012, in the home match against FC Utrecht, Sporkslede became the unfortunate record holder, as the youngest AFC Ajax player in Eredivisie history to score an own goal. At the age of 19 years and 65 days, he surpassed the former record holder by 50 days, which was held by the German Ajax player Werner Schaaphok, who scored an own goal at the age of 19 years and 115 days, in a match against ADO Den Haag on 16 April 1961. The top five youngest Ajax players to score an own goal is completed by Marciano Vink (19 years and 124 days), Frank Rijkaard (19 years and 136 days) and former Danish talent Jan Mølby (19 years and 140 days). The match against Utrecht ended in a 1–1 draw for Ajax, after the ball accidentally was played back into the own net of Ajax by Sporkslede in the 51st minute.

==== Willem II (loan) ====
On 10 July 2014, it was announced that Sporkslede was sent on loan to Willem II. He made his first league appearance coming on as a 71-minute substitute in the 2–1 away win against Feyenoord at De Kuip on 7 September 2014. On 23 September 2014, Sporkslede made his debut in the KNVB Cup match against Delta Sports which ended in a 2–1 loss for Willem II. His loan was ended during the Winter transfer window as Sporkslede had only played two matches since his arrival in July.

=== Return to Ajax ===
On 26 January 2015, it was announced that Fabian Sporkslede would return to Ajax, playing for the reserves team Jong Ajax in the Eerste Divisie, the 2nd tier of professional football in the Netherlands.

=== RKC Waalwijk ===
On 27 September 2019, he signed a contract for the 2019–20 season with RKC Waalwijk.

=== FC Dinamo Tbilisi ===
On 5 January 2021, he signed a 2-year contract with Dinamo Tbilisi.

=== Bnei Sakhnin ===
On 29 January 2022 signed for Bnei Sakhnin.

== International career ==
Born in the Netherlands, Sporkslede is of Surinamese descent. He is a former youth international for the Netherlands. He was called up to the senior Suriname national team in March 2023.

== Career statistics ==
=== Club performance ===
Club performance			League		Cup		Continental		Other		Total	
Season	Club	League	Apps	Goals	Apps	Goals	Apps	Goals	Apps	Goals	Apps	Goals
Netherlands			League		KNVB Cup		Europe		Other		Total	
2012–13	Ajax	Eredivisie	2	0	1	0	1	0	0	0	4	0
2013–14	Ajax	Eredivisie	0	0	0	0	0	0	0	0	0	0
2014–15	Willem II (loan)	Eredivisie	1	0	1	0	0	0	0	0	2	0
2014–15	Ajax	Eredivisie	0	0	0	0	0	0	0	0	0	0
2016-17	NAC Breda	Eerste Divisie	12	0	1	0	0	0	0	0	13	0
Total	Netherlands		15	0	3	0	1	0	0	0	19	0
Italy			League		Coppa Italia		Europe		Other		Total	
2015-16	Lupa Castelli Romani	Lega Pro	2	0	0	0	0	0	0	0	2	0
Total	Italy		2	0	0	0	0	0	0	0	2	0
Career total			17	0	3	0	1	0	0	0	21	0

Statistics accurate as of last match played on 28 October 2016.

Reserves performance

Club performance			League		Total	
Season	Club	League	Apps	Goals	Apps	Goals
Netherlands			League		Total	
2013–14	Jong Ajax	Eerste Divisie	9	1	9	1
2014-15	Jong Ajax	Eerste Divisie	15	1	15	1
Total	Netherlands		24	2	24	2
Career total			24	2	24	2

Statistics accurate as of last match played on 1 May 2015.

== Honours ==
=== Club ===
Ajax

- Eredivisie (1): 2012–13
