= Omar Migineishvili =

Georgian football player (born 1984)

Personal information
- Date of birth: 2 June 1984 (age 42)
- Place of birth: Tbilisi, Georgia, Soviet Union
- Height: 1.89 m (6 ft 2 1/2 in)
- Position: Goalkeeper

Senior career*
Years	Team	Apps	(Gls)
2002–2004	Samtredia	21	(0)
2005–2006	Torpedo Kutaisi	5	(0)
2006–2008	Lokomotivi Tbilisi	3	(0)
2008–2013	Torpedo Kutaisi	150	(0)
2013–2014	Dinamo Tbilisi	15	(0)
2015	Dila Gori	7	(0)
2015	FC Tskhinvali	0	(0)
2016–2018	FC Samtredia	73	(0)
2018	Rustavi	5	(0)
2019	Saburtalo	24	(0)
2020–2021	Dinamo Tbilisi	3	(0)

International career
2013–2017	Georgia	2	(0)
- * Club domestic league appearances and goals

Omar Migineishvili (Georgian: ომარ მიგინეიშვილი, romanized: omar migineishvili, pronounced [omaɾ miɡineiʃʷili]; born 2 June 1984) is a retired Georgian football player who played as a goalkeeper. He have also played for the national team of Georgia.

37-year old Migineishvili announced his retirement from football in December 2021.

== International career ==
Omar Migineishvili made his first international appearance on 2 June 2013 against Republic of Ireland at Aviva Stadium.

== Honours ==
Torpedo Kutaisi

- Georgian Cup: 2011- Runner-up

Dinamo Tbilisi

- Georgian League: 2013–14
- Georgian Cup: 2014
