= Simon Gbegnon =

Togolese footballer (born 1992)

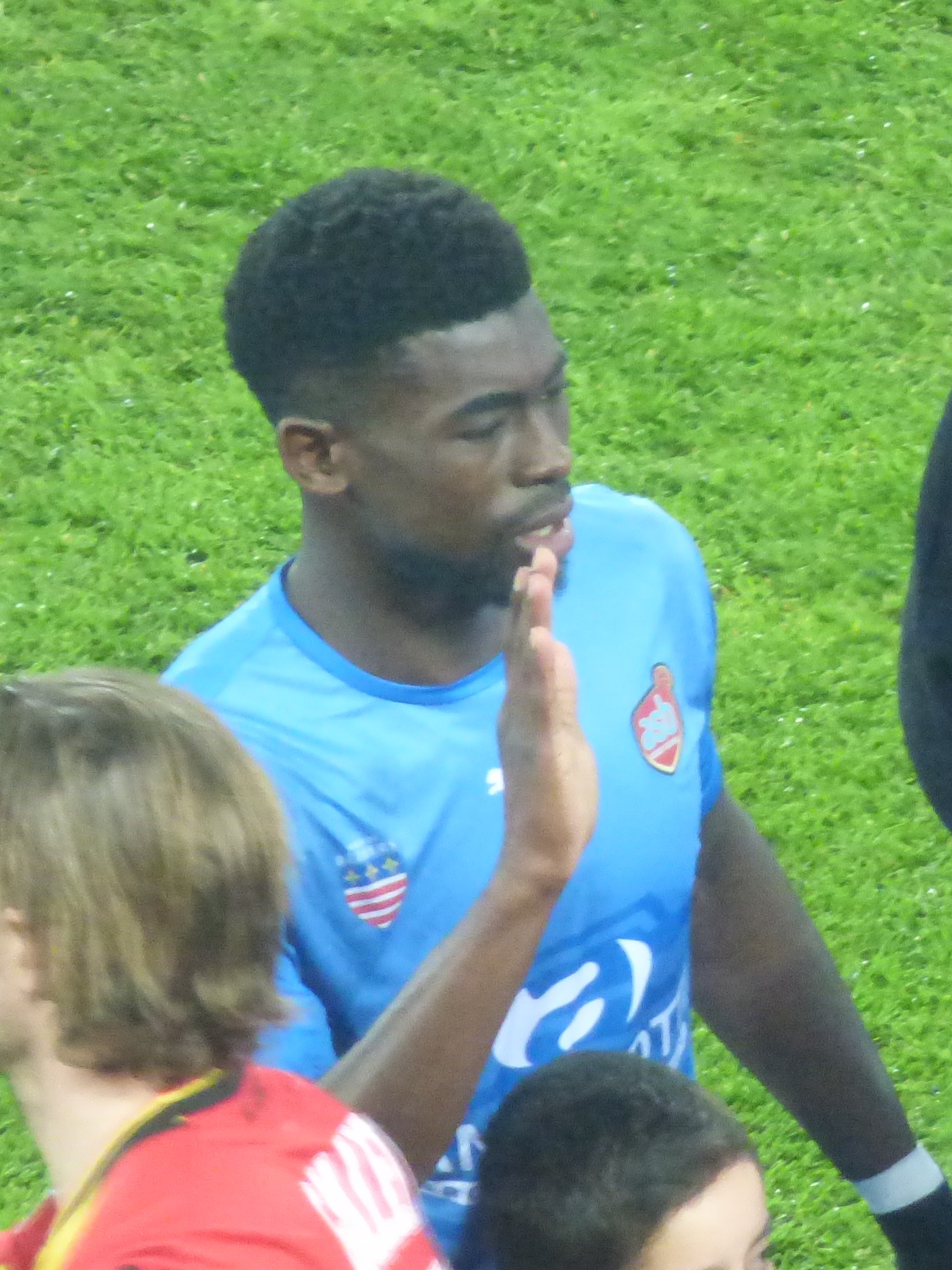
- Gbegnon with Béziers in 2019

Personal information
- Full name: Simon Credo Gbegnon Amoussou
- Date of birth: 27 October 1992 (age 34)
- Place of birth: Nantes, France
- Height: 1.90 m (6 ft 3 in)
- Position: Centre-back

Senior career*
Years	Team	Apps	(Gls)
2010–2011	Vaillante d'Angers		
2011–2012	Rezé		
2012–2013	Chapelain	30	(6)
2013–2014	Carquefou II		
2014–2015	Carquefou	30	(5)
2015–2017	Épinal	60	(7)
2017–2019	AS Béziers	48	(3)
2019–2020	Mirandés	4	(0)
2020–2022	Dinamo Tbilisi	60	(6)
2022–2023	Cholet	21	(3)
2023–2024	Iraklis	29	(2)
2024–2025	Chania	9	(0)

International career^{‡}
2017–	Togo	11	(0)
- * Club domestic league appearances and goals as of 1 July 2025 ‡ National team caps and goals as of 19 September 2020

Simon Credo Gbegnon Amoussou (born 27 October 1992) is a professional footballer who plays as a centre-back. Born in France, he represents Togo at international level.

== Club career ==
Born in Nantes to Togolese parents, Gbegnon started his career with Vaillante Sports d'Angers in the 2010–11 season. He subsequently represented FC Rezé and AC Chapelain, before joining USJA Carquefou in 2013, being initially assigned to the second team.

On 17 June 2015, Gbegnon joined SAS Épinal in the Championnat National, being a regular starter during his two-year spell. On 1 June 2017, he moved to fellow league team AS Béziers, and achieved promotion in his first campaign.

Gbegnon made his professional debut on 27 July 2018, coming on as a second-half substitute for Mickaël Diakota, in a 2–0 away win against AS Nancy. He scored his first goal the following 19 April, netting his team's third in a 6–5 away defeat of Valenciennes FC; he was a first-choice for the club during the campaign, but suffered team relegation.

On 7 August 2019, Gbegnon moved abroad for the first time in his career and signed for Segunda División newcomers CD Mirandés.

On 12 September 2022, Gbegnon signed a one-year contract with Cholet in Championnat National.

== International career ==
Born in France, Gbegnon is Togolese by descent. He debuted for the Togo national football team in a friendly 0–0 tie with Libya on 24 March 2017.
