= 2018–19 FC Chornomorets Odesa season =

FC Chornomorets Odesa
2018–19 season
- General Director: Anatoly Mysyura
- Manager: Angel Chervenkov
- Stadium: Chornomorets Stadium
- Ukrainian Premier League: 11th (relegated)
- Ukrainian Cup: Round of 16 (1/8)
- Top goalscorer: League: Árni Vilhjálmsson (7); All: Árni Vilhjálmsson (7)
- Average home league attendance: 4,907
| Home colours | Away colours | Third colours |

The 2018–19 season was the 81st season in the club's history and the 28th season of Odesa football club "Chornomorets" in the domestic league/cup of Ukraine. "The Sailors" competed in the 2018–19 Ukrainian Premier League and 2018–19 Ukrainian Cup.

After finishing in 11th place in the Ukrainian Premier League, Chornomorets lost to FC Kolos Kovalivka in play-offs and were relegated to the Ukrainian First League.

== Players ==
=== Squad information ===
As of 8 June 2019

| Squad no. | Name | Nationality | Position | Date of birth (age) |
Goalkeepers
| 1 | Serhiy Litovchenko (Captain) | (Ukraine) | GK | 4 October 1987 (aged 31) |
| 12 | Andriy Kozhukhar ^{List B} | (Ukraine) | GK | 20 July 1999 (aged 19) |
Defenders
| 3 | Ivan Trubochkin | (Ukraine) | DF | 17 March 1993 (aged 26) |
| 4 | Artem Yarmolenko ^{List B} | (Ukraine) | DF | 18 January 1998 (aged 21) |
| 5 | Dmytro Ryzhuk | (Ukraine) | DF | 5 April 1992 (aged 27) |
| 8 | Oleksandr Holikov | (Ukraine) | DF | 13 November 1991 (aged 27) |
| 15 | Hlib Hrachov ^{List B} | (Ukraine) | DF | 15 May 1997 (aged 22) |
| 23 | Denys Norenkov | (Ukraine) | DF | 25 July 1996 (aged 22) |
| 24 | Oleksandr Kalitov | (Ukraine) | DF | 29 September 1993 (aged 25) |
| 33 | Andriy Mischenko | (Ukraine) | DF | 7 April 1991 (aged 28) |
| 77 | Oleh Ostapenko ^{List B} | (Ukraine) | DF | 11 June 1997 (aged 21) |
Midfielders
| 7 | Mykola Musolitin ^{List B} | (Ukraine) | MF | 21 January 1999 (aged 20) |
| 9 | Volodymyr Arzhanov | (Ukraine) | MF | 29 November 1985 (aged 33) |
| 10 | Vitaliy Hoshkoderya | (Ukraine) | MF | 8 January 1988 (aged 31) |
| 11 | Yevhen Morozenko | (Ukraine) | MF | 16 December 1991 (aged 27) |
| 13 | Artem Chorniy | (Ukraine) | MF | 23 November 1989 (aged 29) |
| 20 | Ruslan Babenko | (Ukraine) | MF | 8 July 1992 (aged 26) |
| 21 | Vladyslav Khamelyuk ^{List B} | (Ukraine) | MF | 4 May 1998 (aged 21) |
| 34 | Volodymyr Tanchyk | (Ukraine) | MF | 17 October 1991 (aged 27) |
Forwards
| 22 | Andriy Shtohrin ^{List B} | (Ukraine) | FW | 14 December 1998 (aged 20) |
| 24 | Vasili Pavlov | (Russia) (Moldova) | FW | 24 July 1990 (aged 28) |
| 25 | Volodymyr Koval | (Ukraine) | FW | 6 March 1992 (aged 27) |
| 98 | Dmytro Semeniv ^{List B} | (Ukraine) | FW | 24 June 1998 (aged 20) |
| 99 | Árni Vilhjálmsson (on loan from Termalica Nieciecza) | (Iceland) | FW | 9 May 1994 (aged 25) |

== Transfers ==
=== In ===
| Date | Pos. | Player | Age | Moving from | Type | Fee | Source |
Summer
| 5 July 2018 | FW | (Ukraine) Anatoliy Didenko | 36 | (Ukraine) FC Mariupol | Transfer | Free | |
| 6 July 2018 | MF | (Ukraine) Dmytro Leonov | 29 | (Ukraine) Kolos Kovalivka | Transfer | Free | |
| 6 July 2018 | MF | (Ukraine) Denys Norenkov | 21 | (Ukraine) Zhemchuzhyna Odesa | Transfer | Free | |
| 11 July 2018 | GK | (Ukraine) Serhiy Litovchenko | 30 | (Azerbaijan) Kapaz | Transfer | Undisclosed | |
| 11 July 2018 | DF | (Ukraine) Ivan Trubochkin | 25 | (Ukraine) Arsenal Kyiv | Transfer | Undisclosed | |
| 13 July 2018 | DF | (Ukraine) Oleh Ostapenko | 21 | (Ukraine) Vorskla Poltava | Transfer | Undisclosed | |
| 13 July 2018 | MF | (Ukraine) Vladyslav Khomutov | 20 | (Ukraine) Olimpik Donetsk | Transfer | Free | |
| 13 July 2018 | MF | (Ukraine) Oleksiy Savchenko | 24 | (Ukraine) FC Poltava | Transfer | Free | |
| 16 July 2018 | DF | (Ukraine) Hlib Hrachov | 21 | (Ukraine) Stal Kamianske | Transfer | Undisclosed | |
| 17 July 2018 | DF | (Ukraine) Dmytro Ryzhuk | 26 | (Israel) Hapoel Afula | Transfer | Undisclosed | |
| 17 July 2018 | MF | (Ukraine) Artur Karnoza | 27 | (Ukraine) SC Dnipro-1 | Transfer | Undisclosed | |
| 25 July 2018 | MF | (Ukraine) Ruslan Babenko | 26 | (Ukraine) Zorya Luhansk | Transfer | Free | |
| 16 August 2018 | DF | (Ukraine) Oleksandr Kalitov | 24 | (Ukraine) Nyva Vinnytsia | Transfer | Undisclosed | |
| 16 August 2018 | FW | (Ukraine) Volodymyr Koval | 26 | (Poland) Olimpia Grudziądz | Transfer | Undisclosed | |
| 26 September 2018 | DF | (Ukraine) Andriy Mischenko | 27 | (Ukraine) Olimpik Donetsk | Transfer | Free | |
| 28 September 2018 | FW | (Netherlands) Robert Mutzers | 25 | Unattached | Transfer | Free | |
| 31 May 2018 | GK | (Ukraine) Bohdan Lobodrov | 21 | (Ukraine) Balkany Zorya | Loan return | | |
| 31 May 2018 | DF | (Ukraine) Vladyslav Schetinin | 20 | (Ukraine) Zhemchuzhyna Odesa | Loan return | | |
| 31 May 2018 | MF | (Ukraine) Oleksiy Chenyshev | 20 | (Ukraine) Zhemchuzhyna Odesa | Loan return | | |
| 31 May 2018 | MF | (Ukraine) Mykhaylo Popov | 21 | (Ukraine) Zhemchuzhyna Odesa | Loan return | | |
| 31 May 2018 | MF | (Ukraine) Artem Seleznyov | 19 | (Ukraine) Zhemchuzhyna Odesa | Loan return | | |
| 31 May 2018 | MF | (Ukraine) Viktor Serdenyuk | 22 | (Ukraine) Zhemchuzhyna Odesa | Loan return | | |
| 31 May 2018 | FW | (Ukraine) Oleksiy Khoblenko | 24 | (Poland) Lech Poznań | Loan return | | |
Winter
| 28 January 2019 | MF | (Ukraine) Volodymyr Tanchyk | 27 | (Poland) Stomil Olsztyn | Transfer | Free | |
| 8 February 2019 | DF | (Ukraine) Oleksandr Holikov | 27 | (Ukraine) FC Lviv | Transfer | Free | |
| 8 February 2019 | MF | (Ukraine) Yevhen Morozenko | 27 | Unattached | Transfer | Free | |
| 9 February 2019 | MF | (Ukraine) Volodymyr Arzhanov | 33 | (Kazakhstan) Kaysar Kyzylorda | Transfer | Free | |
| 9 February 2019 | MF | (Ukraine) Vitaliy Hoshkoderya | 31 | (Kazakhstan) FC Okzhetpes | Transfer | Free | |
| 14 February 2019 | FW | (Russia) Vasili Pavlov | 28 | (Latvia) Ventspils | Transfer | Free | |
| 28 February 2019 | FW | (Iceland) Árni Vilhjálmsson | 24 | (Poland) Termalica Nieciecza | Loan | | |

=== Out ===
| Date | Pos. | Player | Age | Moving to | Type | Fee | Source |
Summer
| 14 June 2018 | MF | (Ukraine) Maksym Tretyakov | 22 | (Slovakia) Dunajská Streda | Transfer | Undisclosed | |
| 15 June 2018 | DF | (Ukraine) Serhiy Lyulka | 28 | (Ukraine) Desna Chernihiv | Transfer | Undisclosed | |
| 20 June 2018 | MF | (Ukraine) Kyrylo Kovalets | 25 | (Ukraine) FC Oleksandriya | Transfer | Undisclosed | |
| 23 June 2018 | DF | (Ukraine) Yevhen Martynenko | 25 | (Ukraine) Vorskla Poltava | Transfer | Undisclosed | |
| 28 June 2018 | MF | (Guinea) Fousseni Bamba | 28 | (Hungary) Honvéd | Transfer | Undisclosed | |
| 1 July 2018 | MF | (Ukraine) Oleksiy Chenyshev | 20 | (Ukraine) Balkany Zorya | Transfer | Undisclosed | |
| 3 July 2018 | FW | (Ukraine) Oleksiy Khoblenko | 24 | (Belarus) Dynamo Brest | Transfer | Undisclosed | |
| 4 July 2018 | DF | (Ukraine) Yevhen Zubeyko | 28 | (Ukraine) Olimpik Donetsk | Transfer | Undisclosed | |
| 16 July 2018 | DF | (Croatia) Ivica Žunić | 29 | (Kazakhstan) FC Atyrau | Transfer | Undisclosed | |
| 20 July 2018 | MF | (Ukraine) Viktor Serdenyuk | 22 | (Ukraine) Kremin Kremenchuk | Transfer | Undisclosed | |
| 3 August 2018 | MF | (Ukraine) Mykhaylo Popov | 21 | (Ukraine) Kremin Kremenchuk | Transfer | Undisclosed | |
| 6 August 2018 | GK | (Ukraine) Bohdan Lobodrov | 21 | (Ukraine) Balkany Zorya | Transfer | Undisclosed | |
| 13 August 2018 | GK | (Ukraine) Andriy Novak | 29 | (Ukraine) Prykarpattia Ivano-Frankivsk | Transfer | Free | |
| 31 August 2018 | FW | (Ukraine) Oleksandr Hladkyy | 29 | (Turkey) Rizespor | Transfer | Free | |
| 8 September 2018 | FW | (Ukraine) Ivan Matyazh | 30 | (Ukraine) Avanhard Kramatorsk | Transfer | Free | |
| 10 September 2018 | FW | (Brazil) Sílvio | 24 | (Albania) Vllaznia Shkodër | Transfer | Free | |
| 24 September 2018 | DF | (France) Mamadou Wagué | 28 | (Iraq) Al-Shorta | Transfer | Free | |
| 28 September 2018 | MF | (Brazil) Guttiner Tenorio | 23 | (Malta) Hibernians | Transfer | Free | |
| 31 May 2018 | MF | (Ukraine) Pavlo Orikhovskyi | 22 | (Ukraine) Dynamo Kyiv | Loan return | | |
Winter
| 1 January 2019 | DF | (Ukraine) Oleh Sokolov | 19 | Unattached | Transfer | Free | |
| 1 January 2019 | FW | (Ukraine) Anatoliy Didenko | 36 | Unattached | Transfer | Free | |
| 10 January 2019 | FW | (Netherlands) Robert Mutzers | 25 | (Netherlands) Kozakken Boys | Transfer | Free | |
| 14 January 2019 | MF | (Ukraine) Yuriy Romanyuk | 21 | (Ukraine) SC Dnipro-1 | Transfer | Free | |
| 6 February 2019 | MF | (Ukraine) Yevhen Smirnov | 25 | (Belarus) FC Gomel | Transfer | Free | |
| 13 February 2019 | MF | (Ukraine) Artur Karnoza | 28 | (Ukraine) FC Mynai | Transfer | Free | |
| 27 February 2019 | MF | (Ukraine) Dmytro Leonov | 30 | Unattached | Transfer | Free | |
| February 2019 | MF | (Ukraine) Vladyslav Khomutov | 20 | (Slovakia) ViOn Zlaté Moravce | Transfer | Free | |
| 5 March 2019 | MF | (Ukraine) Oleksiy Savchenko | 25 | (Ukraine) Polissya Zhytomyr | Transfer | Free | |
| 22 March 2019 | FW | (Ukraine) Mykyta Tatarkov | 24 | (Belarus) Shakhtyor Soligorsk | Transfer | Free | |
| 26 April 2019 | GK | (Ukraine) Dmytro Bezruk | 23 | (Azerbaijan) Sabah | Transfer | Free | |

== Pre-season and friendlies ==
| 27 June 2018 Friendly | Chornomorets Odesa (Ukraine) | 3–1 | (Ukraine) Balkany Zorya | Odesa |
| 17:00 EEST (UTC+03:00) | Shtohrin 17'; Smirnov 65', 76' | Report | Palamar 37' | Stadium: Chornomorets train base Attendance: 50; Referee: Dmytro Bondarenko |

| 7 July 2018 Friendly | Chornomorets Odesa (Ukraine) | 1–0 | (Ukraine) Real Pharma Odesa | Odesa |
| 17 EEST (UTC+03:00) | Didenko 19' | Report | | Stadium: Chornomorets train base Attendance: 100; Referee: Dmytro Bondarenko |

| 11 July 2018 Friendly | Chornomorets Odesa (Ukraine) | 1–0 | (Ukraine) Balkany Zorya | Odesa |
| 17:00 EEST (UTC+03:00) | Chorniy 27' | Report | | Stadium: Chornomorets train base Attendance: 100; Referee: Yevhen Petrenko |

| 14 July 2018 Friendly | Chornomorets Odesa (Ukraine) | 2–2 | (Ukraine) MFC Mykolaiv | Odesa |
| 18:00 EEST (UTC+03:00) | Yarmolenko 45'; Norenkov 50' | Report | 8'; 82' (pen.) | Stadium: Chornomorets train base Referee: Oleksandr Derdo |

| 16 November 2018 Friendly | Chornomorets Odesa (Ukraine) | 2–4 | (Moldova) Sfântul Gheorghe Suruceni | Odesa |
| 17:00 EET (UTC+02:00) | Chorniy 48', 80' (pen.) | Report | Istrati 33'; Plămădeală 66' (pen.), 83'; Carastoian 73' | Stadium: Chornomorets train base Attendance: 50; Referee: Oleksandr Derdo |

| 24 January 2019 Friendly | Chornomorets Odesa (Ukraine) | 1–2 | (Hungary) Diósgyőr | Side, Turkey |
| 10:00 EET (UTC+02:00) | 14' | Report | Bence 62'; Vernes 82' (pen.) | Stadium: Starlight hotel |

| 28 January 2019 Friendly | Chornomorets Odesa (Ukraine) | 0–2 | (Turkmenistan) Ahal | Side, Turkey |
| 16:00 EET (UTC+02:00) | | Report | Ilgazov 23'; Sultanov 59' | Stadium: Starlight hotel Referee: Furkan Aldemir |

| 31 January 2019 Friendly | Chornomorets Odesa (Ukraine) | 2–1 | (Poland) Miedź Legnica | Side, Turkey |
| 15:00 EET (UTC+02:00) | Mischenko 8'; 26' | Report | Miljković 37' | Stadium: Starlight hotel |

| 6 February 2019 Friendly | Chornomorets Odesa (Ukraine) | 0–0 | (Slovenia) Mura Murska Sobota | Side, Turkey |
| 16:00 EET (UTC+02:00) | | Report | | Stadium: Starlight hotel |

| 10 February 2019 Friendly | Chornomorets Odesa (Ukraine) | 0–0 | (Poland) Raków Częstochowa | Side, Turkey |
| 16:00 EET (UTC+02:00) | | Report | | Stadium: Starlight hotel |

| 16 February 2019 Friendly | Chornomorets Odesa (Ukraine) | 1–1 | (Ukraine) MFC Mykolaiv | Odesa |
| 14:00 EET (UTC+02:00) | Holikov 3' | Report | 5' | Stadium: Chornomorets train base Referee: Vitaliy Hodulian |

| 29 March 2019 Friendly | Chornomorets Odesa (Ukraine) | 2–1 | (Ukraine) Balkany Zorya | Odesa |
| 16:00 EET (UTC+02:00) | Vilhjálmsson 68'; Chorniy 69' | Report | Vadym Zlatov 52' | Stadium: Chornomorets train base Referee: Ihor Horban |

== Competitions ==
=== Overall ===
| Competition | First match | Last match | Starting round | Final position | Record | | | | | | | |
| Competition | First match | Last match | Starting round | Final position | Pld | W | D | L | GF | GA | GD | Win % |
|---|---|---|---|---|---|---|---|---|---|---|---|---|
| Premier League | 23 July 2018 | 8 June 2019 | Matchday 1 | Relegation play-off (11th) | 34 | 8 | 8 | 18 | 31 | 51 | −20 | 23.53 |
| Cup | 26 September 2018 | 31 October 2018 | Round of 32 (1/16) | Round of 16 (1/8) | 2 | 1 | 0 | 1 | 4 | 2 | +2 | 50.00 |
| Total | | | | | 36 | 9 | 8 | 19 | 35 | 53 | −18 | 25.00 |

Last updated: 8 June 2019
Source: Competitions

=== Premier League ===
==== League table ====
| Pos | Team | Pld | W | D | L | GF | GA | GD | Pts | Qualification or relegation |
|---|---|---|---|---|---|---|---|---|---|---|
| 8 | Desna Chernihiv | 32 | 12 | 5 | 15 | 35 | 41 | −6 | 41 | |
| 9 | Olimpik Donetsk | 32 | 7 | 13 | 12 | 41 | 48 | −7 | 34 | |
| 10 | Karpaty Lviv (O) | 32 | 8 | 9 | 15 | 44 | 53 | −9 | 33 | Qualification for the Relegation play-offs |
| 11 | Chornomorets Odesa (R) | 32 | 8 | 7 | 17 | 31 | 49 | −18 | 31 | Qualification for the Relegation play-offs |
| 12 | Arsenal Kyiv (R, X) | 32 | 7 | 5 | 20 | 26 | 56 | −30 | 26 | Relegated and later withdrawn |

Source: Ukrainian Premier League (in Ukrainian), UEFA, Soccerway
Rules for classification: 1) Points; 2) Head-to-head points; 3) Head-to-head goal difference; 4) Head-to-head higher number of goals scored; 5) Goal difference; 6) Higher number of goals scored; 7) Draw or "golden match" if tied for title (Article 22, paragraph 3).
(O) Play-off winners; (R) Relegated; (X) Withdrew

Teams that placed 10th and 11th in the 2018–19 Ukrainian Premier League play two-leg play-off with the second and third teams of the 2018–19 Ukrainian First League. The draw for play-offs took place on 24 May 2019 and the games will be played on 4 and 8 June 2019.

| Team 1 | Agg. | Team 2 | 1st leg | 2nd leg |
|---|---|---|---|---|
| Chornomorets Odesa | 0 – 2 | Kolos Kovalivka | 0 – 0 | 0 – 2 |
| Karpaty Lviv | 3 – 1 | Volyn Lutsk | 0 – 0 | 3 – 1 |

=== First leg ===
4 June 2019
19:00 UTC+3

| Chornomorets Odesa | 0 – 0 | Kolos Kovalivka |
|---|---|---|
| | Report |

Chornomorets Stadium, Odesa
Attendance: 5,435
Referee: Anatoliy Abdula (Kharkiv)

4 June 2019
19:00 UTC+3

| Karpaty Lviv | 0 – 0 | Volyn Lutsk |
|---|---|---|
| | Report |

Ukraina Stadium, Lviv
Attendance: 10,104
Referee: Denys Shurman (Vyshneve)

=== Second leg ===
8 June 2019
17:00 UTC+3

| Kolos Kovalivka | 2 – 0 | Chornomorets Odesa |
|---|---|---|
| Havrysh 57', 63' (pen.) | Report |

Kolos Stadium, Kovalivka
Attendance: 2,500
Referee: Vitaliy Romanov

Kolos Kovalivka won 2–0 on aggregate and were promoted to the 2019–20 Ukrainian Premier League. Chornomorets Odesa were relegated to the 2019–20 Ukrainian First League

8 June 2019
19:00 UTC+3

| Volyn Lutsk | 0 – 3 ~~1 – 3~~ | Karpaty Lviv |
|---|---|---|
| Kozhanov 42' | Report | Klyots 37'; Ponde 82' (pen.); Miroshnichenko 90+5' |

Avanhard Stadium, Lutsk
Attendance: 5,200
Referee: Maksym Kozyryatskyi

Karpaty Lviv won 3–0 on aggregate and retained their spot in the 2019–20 Ukrainian Premier League. Volyn Lutsk remained in the 2019–20 Ukrainian First League

Due to fan violence at the game and attack on referee, the original score 1–3 was scratched and replaced with technical score 0–3 loss to Volyn and win for Karpaty. Additionally, the Lutsk department of police started criminal proceedings on the fact of intentional damage to property during the game by the Karpaty fans.

==== Results summary ====
| Overall | | | | | | | | Home | | | | | | Away | | | | | |
| Pld | W | D | L | GF | GA | GD | Pts | W | D | L | GF | GA | GD | W | D | L | GF | GA | GD |
|---|---|---|---|---|---|---|---|---|---|---|---|---|---|---|---|---|---|---|---|
| 32 | 8 | 7 | 17 | 31 | 49 | −18 | 31 | 5 | 2 | 9 | 15 | 25 | −10 | 3 | 5 | 8 | 16 | 24 | −8 |

Last updated: 29 May 2019.
Source: Competitive matches

==== Results by round ====
| Round | 1 | 2 | 3 | 4 | 5 | 6 | 7 | 8 | 9 | 10 | 11 | 12 | 13 | 14 | 15 | 16 | 17 | 18 | 19 | 20 | 21 | 22 | 23 | 24 | 25 | 26 | 27 | 28 | 29 | 30 | 31 | 32 |
|---|---|---|---|---|---|---|---|---|---|---|---|---|---|---|---|---|---|---|---|---|---|---|---|---|---|---|---|---|---|---|---|---|
| Ground | H | A | A | H | A | H | A | H | A | H | A | A | H | H | A | H | A | H | A | H | A | H | H | H | A | H | A | A | A | H | A | H |
| Result | W | L | D | W | D | D | L | L | L | L | L | L | L | L | L | W | L | L | W | L | D | L | L | D | D | L | W | D | L | W | W | W |
| Position | 5 | 6 | 5 | 5 | 4 | 4 | 5 | 8 | 11 | 11 | 11 | 11 | 11 | 11 | 11 | 11 | 11 | 11 | 11 | 11 | 11 | 11 | 11 | 12 | 12 | 12 | 12 | 12 | 12 | 12 | 11 | 11 |

Updated to match(es) played on 29 May 2019. Source: Competitive matches
A = Away; H = Home; W = Win; D = Draw; L = Loss

==== Matches ====
| 23 July 2018 1 | Chornomorets Odesa | 2–1 | Olimpik Donetsk | Odesa |
| 19:00 EEST (UTC+03:00) | Ryzhuk 9'; Smirnov (yellow card) 22'; Leonov (yellow card) 55'; Tatarkov 66'; Yarmolenko (yellow card) 83' | Report | Vakulenko (yellow card) 18'; Melinyshyn (yellow card) 67'; Dehtyarev 70' | Stadium: Chornomorets Odesa; Attendance: 4,364; Referee: Mykola Kryvonosov |

| 29 July 2018 2 | Karpaty Lviv | 1–0 | Chornomorets Odesa | Lviv |
| 17:00 EEST (UTC+03:00) | Shved 16'; Kuchynskyi (yellow card) 90+4' | Report | Savchenko (yellow card) 37'; Babenko (yellow card) 52' | Stadium: Ukraina Stadium; Attendance: 2,850; Referee: Denys Shurman |

| 4 August 2018 3 | Zorya Luhansk | 1–1 | Chornomorets Odesa | Zaporizhia |
| 19:30 EEST (UTC+03:00) | Rafael Ratão 22'; Cheberko (yellow card) 88' | Report | Hrachov (yellow card) 52'; Savchenko 59' | Stadium: Slavutych-Arena; Attendance: 3,961; Referee: Viktor Kopiyevskyi |

| 12 August 2018 4 | Chornomorets Odesa | 1–0 | Desna Chernihiv | Odesa |
| 19:30 EEST (UTC+03:00) | Smirnov 72' | Report | | Stadium: Chornomorets Odesa; Attendance: 5,410; Referee: Oleksandr Omelchenko |

| 17 August 2018 5 | Arsenal Kyiv | 1–1 | Chornomorets Odesa | Kyiv |
| 19:00 EEST (UTC+03:00) | Maydanevych 26', (yellow card) 73'; Dubinchak (yellow card) 27'; Yebli (yellow card) 56'; Orikhovskyi (yellow card) 85'; Dombrovskyi (yellow card) 90' (yellow-red card) 90+1' | Report | Litovchenko (yellow card) 26'; Chorniy (yellow card) 33'; Babenko 35'; Romanyuk (yellow card) 61' | Stadium: Dynamo Stadium; Attendance: 987; Referee: Ihor Paskhal |

| 25 August 2018 6 | Chornomorets Odesa | 1–1 | Dynamo Kyiv | Odesa |
| 19:30 EEST (UTC+03:00) | Babenko (yellow card) 75'; Hrachov 84'; Litovchenko (yellow card) 90+3'; Smirnov (yellow card) 90+3' | Report | Rusyn 59' | Stadium: Chornomorets Stadium; Attendance: 13,272; Referee: Anatoliy Abdula |

| 31 August 2018 7 | Vorskla Poltava | 2–1 | Chornomorets Odesa | Poltava |
| 19:00 EEST (UTC+03:00) | Sklyar (yellow card) 3'; Kulach 49'; Careca (yellow card) 73'; Sharpar (yellow card) 85'; Ryzhuk 88' (o.g.); Habelok (yellow card) 90+3' | Report | Smirnov (yellow card) 54'; Trubochkin (yellow card) 59'; Chorniy 63'; Hrachov (yellow card) 89' | Stadium: Vorskla Stadium; Attendance: 3,315; Referee: Kostiantyn Trukhanov |

| 16 September 2018 8 | Chornomorets Odesa | 0–1 | FC Lviv | Odesa |
| 19:30 EEST (UTC+03:00) | Leonov (yellow card) 32'; Chorniy (yellow card) 80'; Tatarkov (yellow card) 81'; Romanyuk (yellow card) 90+3' | Report | Bruno Duarte 43', (yellow card) 84'; Kalenchuk (yellow card) 87'; Bilyi (yellow card) 90' | Stadium: Chornomorets Odesa; Attendance: 6,421; Referee: Volodymyr Novokhatniy |

| 23 September 2018 9 | Shakhtar Donetsk | 3–0 | Chornomorets Odesa | Kharkiv |
| 17:00 EEST (UTC+03:00) | Moraes (yellow card) 9', (goal) 57'; Maycon (yellow card) 16'; Trubochkin 59' (o.g.); Taison 82' | Report | Ryzhuk (yellow card) 6'; Babenko (yellow card) 72' | Stadium: OSC Metalist; Attendance: 6,081; Referee: Ievgenii Aranovskyi |

| 30 September 2018 10 | Chornomorets Odesa | 0–1 | FC Mariupol | Odesa |
| 17:00 EEST (UTC+03:00) | Savchenko (yellow card) 49'; Musolitin (yellow card) 50'; Smirnov (yellow card) 74' | Report | Dawa (yellow card) 12'; Myshnyov (yellow card) 14'; Vakula 69'; Ihnatenko (yellow card) 85' | Stadium: Chornomorets Odesa; Attendance: 4,850; Referee: Vitaliy Romanov |

| 6 October 2018 11 | FC Oleksandriya | 3–2 | Chornomorets Odesa | Oleksandriya |
| 17:00 EEST (UTC+03:00) | Banada (yellow card) 24', (goal) 70'; Pashayev (yellow card) 41'; Kovalets 44', (yellow card) 77'; Bondarenko (yellow card) 47'; Shastal 56' | Report | Hrachov 18', (yellow card) 54'; Savchenko (yellow card) 28'; Leonov (yellow card) 51'; Musolitin (yellow card) 55'; Tatarkov 80' | Stadium: CSC Nika Stadium; Attendance: 1,501; Referee: Ihor Paskhal |

| 21 October 2018 12 | Olimpik Donetsk | 1–0 | Chornomorets Odesa | Kyiv |
| 17:00 EEST (UTC+03:00) | Balashov (yellow card) 6'; Ksyonz (yellow card) 39'; Snurnitsyn (yellow card) 51'; Dehtyarev 70'; Kravchuk (yellow card) 90+3' | Report | Chorniy (yellow card) 20'; Trubochkin (yellow card) 49' | Stadium: Dynamo Stadium; Attendance: 800; Referee: Yuriy Mozharovskyi |

| 28 October 2018 13 | Chornomorets Odesa | 0–5 | Karpaty Lviv | Odesa |
| 14:00 EET (UTC+02:00) | Hrachov (yellow card) 2'; Trubochkin (yellow card) 47'; Shtohrin (yellow card) 88' | Report | Shved 2' (pen.); Mehremić (yellow card) 21'; Ponde (yellow card) 28', (goal) 48'; Myakushko 78', 90+5'; Klyots (yellow card) 81'; Hutsulyak 90+6' | Stadium: Chornomorets Stadium; Attendance: 4,860; Referee: Dmytro Kryvushkin |

| 4 November 2018 14 | Chornomorets Odesa | 0–3 | Zorya Luhansk | Odesa |
| 19:30 EET (UTC+02:00) | Ostapenko (yellow card) 25' | Report | Tymchyk 27'; Mayboroda 66'; Karavayev 72' | Stadium: Chornomorets Odesa; Attendance: 360; Referee: Yaroslav Kozyk |

| 10 November 2018 15 | Desna Chernihiv | 2–0 | Chornomorets Odesa | Chernihiv |
| 17:00 EET (UTC+02:00) | Denys Favorov (yellow card) 15'; Bezborodko 55'; Artem Favorov 63' | Report | Ryzhuk (yellow card) 28' (yellow-red card) 42' | Stadium: Chernihiv Stadium; Attendance: 2,618; Referee: Oleksandr Omelchenko |

| 25 November 2018 16 | Chornomorets Odesa | 2–1 | Arsenal Kyiv | Odesa |
| 17:00 EET (UTC+02:00) | Koval (yellow card) 36', (goal) 69'; Savchenko (yellow card) 49'; Musolitin 67' | Report | Dubinchak (yellow card) 16'; Semenyuk 62'; Balanyuk (yellow card) 77' | Stadium: Chornomorets Stadium; Attendance: 2,750; Referee: Yuriy Mozharovskyi |

| 3 December 2018 17 | Dynamo Kyiv | 2–0 | Chornomorets Odesa | Kyiv |
| 18:30 EET (UTC+02:00) | Tsyhankov 21' (pen.), (yellow card) 88'; Besyedin 61' (pen.), (yellow card) 72'; Sydorchuk (yellow card) 79'; Shabanov (yellow card) 81'; Verbič (yellow card) 88' | Report | Norenkov (yellow card) 52'; Hrachov (yellow card) 60'; Semeniv (yellow card) 71'; Musolitin (yellow card) 79'; Koval (yellow card) 82' | Stadium: NSC Olimpiyskiy; Attendance: 3,870; Referee: Yuriy Ivanov |

| 8 December 2018 18 | Chornomorets Odesa | 0–1 | Vorskla Poltava | Odesa |
| 17:00 EET (UTC+02:00) | Ostapenko (yellow card) 45+1'; Koval (yellow card) 90+2' | Report | Chyzhov 4', (yellow card) 28'; Sakiv (yellow card) 84' | Stadium: Chornomorets Odesa; Attendance: 3,250; Referee: Volodymyr Novokhatniy |

| 23 February 2019 19 | FC Lviv | 0–1 | Chornomorets Odesa | Lviv |
| 17:00 EET (UTC+02:00) | Lipe Veloso (yellow card) 56'; Adamyuk (yellow card) 57'; Paramonov (yellow card) 59'; Rafael Sabino (yellow card) 65'; Pryimak (yellow card) 85' | Report | Babenko (yellow card) 17'; Hoshkoderya 32'; Mischenko (yellow card) 59'; Koval (yellow card) 83' | Stadium: Ukraina Stadium; Attendance: 700; Referee: Volodymyr Novokhatniy |

| 2 March 2018 20 | Chornomorets Odesa | 0–1 | Shakhtar Donetsk | Odesa |
| 17:00 EET (UTC+02:00) | Ryzhuk (yellow card) 42'; Litovchenko (yellow card) 53'; Arzhanov (yellow card) 59' | Report | Kryvtsov (yellow card) 65'; Marlos 76' (pen.), (yellow card) 90+2' | Stadium: Chornomorets Odesa; Attendance: 10,125; Referee: Ihor Paskhal |

| 9 March 2018 21 | FC Mariupol | 0–0 | Chornomorets Odesa | Mariupol |
| 14:00 EET (UTC+02:00) | Ihnatenko (yellow card) 90+4' | Report | Mischenko (yellow card) 50'; Holikov (yellow card) 90' | Stadium: Volodymyr Boiko Stadium; Attendance: 2,227; Referee: Yuriy Mozharovskyi |

| 16 March 2018 22 | Chornomorets Odesa | 0–3 | FC Oleksandriya | Odesa |
| 14:00 EET (UTC+02:00) | Arzhanov (yellow card) 44'; Koval (red card) 54'; Musolitin (yellow card) 76'; Babenko (yellow card) 81' | Report | Sitalo 5', 39'; Babohlo (yellow card) 10', (goal) 32'; Luchkevych (yellow card) 11'; Hrechyshkin (yellow card) 86' | Stadium: Chornomorets Odesa; Attendance: 4,285; Referee: Mykola Balakin |

| 6 April 2019 23 | Chornomorets Odesa | 1–3 | Arsenal Kyiv | Odesa |
| 17:00 EEST (UTC+03:00) | Morozenko (yellow card) 23'; Pavlov (yellow card) 32'; Ryzhuk (yellow card) 45+1'; Chorniy 62'; Babenko (yellow card) 87' | Report | Missi Mezu 5'; Vakulenko 26' (pen.); Orikhovskyi 37'; Avahimyan (yellow card) 47'; Tankovskyi (yellow card) 54'; Kadymyan (yellow card) 76'; Zhychykov (yellow card) 87' | Stadium: Chornomorets Stadium; Attendance: 4,251; Referee: Yuriy Ivanov |

| 14 April 2019 24 | Chornomorets Odesa | 1–1 | Olimpik Donetsk | Odesa |
| 19:30 EEST (UTC+03:00) | Vilhjálmsson (yellow card) 3'; Tanchyk 62' | Report | Dehtyarev 40' | Stadium: Chornomorets Odesa; Attendance: 2,850; Referee: Yevhen Aranovskyi |

| 23 April 2019 25 | Karpaty Lviv | 0–0 | Chornomorets Odesa | Lviv |
| 18:00 EEST (UTC+03:00) | Méndez (yellow card) 89'; Ponde (yellow card) 90+1' | Report | Tanchyk (yellow card) 39'; Hrachov (yellow card) 43'; Morozenko (yellow card) 57' | Stadium: Ukraina Stadium; Attendance: 1,663; Referee: Mykola Balakin |

| 27 April 2019 26 | Chornomorets Odesa | 1–2 | Vorskla Poltava | Odesa |
| 14:00 EEST (UTC+03:00) | Vilhjálmsson 2'; Hrachov (yellow card) 39' | Report | Sapay (yellow card) 35'; Kane (yellow card) 44'; Vasin 84' (pen.); Habelok 90+1' | Stadium: Chornomorets Odesa; Attendance: 3,200; Referee: Kostiantyn Trukhanov |

| 5 May 2019 27 | Desna Chernihiv | 2–4 | Chornomorets Odesa | Chernihiv |
| 5 May EEST (UTC+03:00) | Denys Favorov 13'; Nyemchaninov (yellow card) 18'; Bohdanov (yellow card) 19'; Hitchenko 22'; Artem Favorov (yellow card) 46'; Kartushov (yellow card) 56' | Report | Vilhjálmsson 19', 86'; Koval (yellow card) 36'; Babenko (yellow card) 43'; Ryzhuk (yellow card) 79'; Pavlov (yellow card) 88', (goal) 90'; Musolitin 90+4' | Stadium: Chernihiv Stadium; Attendance: 3,074; Referee: Ivan Bondar |

| 12 May 2019 28 | Arsenal Kyiv | 3–3 | Chornomorets Odesa | Kyiv |
| 14:00 EEST (UTC+03:00) | Orikhovskyi (yellow card) 9'; Dubinchak (yellow card) 18'; Vakulenko 57' (pen.), 77'; Lipartia (yellow card) 83'; Zhychykov (yellow card) 87'; Kovpak 88' | Report | Vilhjálmsson 10' (pen.); Koval (yellow card) 18'; Arzhanov (yellow card) 24' (yellow-red card) 45+1'; Semeniv 62'; Babenko 90+1' (pen.) | Stadium: Dynamo Stadium; Attendance: 693; Referee: Viktor Kopiyevskyi |

| 18 May 2019 29 | Olimpik Donetsk | 2–1 | Chornomorets Odesa | Kyiv |
| 19:30 EEST (UTC+03:00) | Dieye 17'; Vantukh 49' | Report | Pavlov 47'; Norenkov (yellow card) 81' (yellow-red card) 90+3'; Koval (yellow card) 90' | Stadium: Dynamo Stadium; Attendance: 319; Referee: Ihor Paskhal |

| 21 May 2019 30 | Chornomorets Odesa | 3–1 | Karpaty Lviv | Odesa |
| 17:00 EEST (UTC+03:00) | Vilhjálmsson 9'; Pavlov 75', (yellow card) 79'; Ryzhuk 83' | Report | Kovtun (yellow card) 3'; Myakushko 74' (pen.) | Stadium: Chornomorets Odesa; Attendance: 3,982; Referee: Vitaliy Romanov |

| 25 May 2019 31 | Vorskla Poltava | 1–2 | Chornomorets Odesa | Poltava |
| 17:00 EEST (UTC+03:00) | Chesnakov (yellow card) 28' (yellow-red card) 68'; Kolomoyets 54' | Report | Koval 26'; Ryzhuk (yellow card) 30'; Tanchyk 62'; Trubochkin (yellow card) 81'; Babenko (yellow card) 84' | Stadium: Vorskla Stadium; Attendance: 1,050; Referee: Serhiy Boyko |

| 29 May 2019 32 | Chornomorets Odesa | 3–0 | Desna Chernihiv | Odesa |
| 17:00 EEST (UTC+03:00) | Ryzhuk (yellow card) 28'; Tanchyk 62'; Vilhjálmsson 73' (pen.), 85', (yellow card) 83'; Ostapenko (yellow card) 78' | Report | Denys Favorov (yellow card) 6'; Ohirya (yellow card) 19'; Nyemchaninov (red card) 72' | Stadium: Chornomorets Odesa; Attendance: 4,285; Referee: Mykola Balakin |

==== Relegation round ====
| 4 June 2019 1 | Chornomorets Odesa | 0–0 | Kolos Kovalivka | Odesa |
| 19:00 EEST (UTC+03:00) | Norenkov (yellow card) 67' | Report | Kyzylatesh (yellow card) 90+1' | Stadium: Chornomorets Odesa; Attendance: 5,435; Referee: Anatoliy Abdula |

| 8 June 2019 2 | Kolos Kovalivka | 2–0 | Chornomorets Odesa | Kovalivka |
| 17:00 EEST (UTC+03:00) | Havrysh 57' (pen.), 63' (pen.); Sakhnevych (yellow card) 67'; Mihunov (yellow card) 90+3'; Yashkov (yellow card) 90+4'; Kostyshyn (yellow card) 90+4' | Report | Norenkov (yellow card) 62'; Arzhanov (yellow card) 62' | Stadium: Kolos Stadium; Attendance: 2,500; Referee: Vitaliy Romanov |

=== Ukrainian Cup ===
| 26 September 2018 Round of 32 | Chornomorets Odesa | 3–0 | FC Oleksandriya | Odesa |
| 19:00 EEST (UTC+03:00) | Chorniy 43' (pen.), 83'; Smirnov (yellow card) 62'; Koval 74' | Report | Vitenchuk (yellow card) 45+2'; Semenov (yellow card) 59'; Hrechyshkin (yellow card) 80' | Stadium: Chornomorets Odesa; Attendance: 3,200; Referee: Oleksandr Omelchenko |

| 31 October 2018 Round of 16 (1/8) | Chornomorets Odesa | 1–2 | Vorskla Poltava | Odesa |
| 17:00 EET (UTC+02:00) | Savchenko (yellow card) 30'; Karnoza (yellow card) 61'; Hrachov 69'; Norenkov (yellow card) 90+8' | Report | Sakiv 60'; Careca 63' (pen.); Sklyar (yellow card) 90+5' | Stadium: Chornomorets Odesa; Attendance: 2,639; Referee: Viktor Kopiyevskyi |

== Statistics ==
=== Appearances and goals ===
| No. | Pos | Nat | Player | Total | | Premier League | | Cup | |
| No. | Pos | Nat | Player | Apps | Goals | Apps | Goals | Apps | Goals |
Goalkeepers
| 1 | GK | (Ukraine) UKR | Serhiy Litovchenko | 26 | 0 | 26 | 0 | 0 | 0 |
| 12 | GK | (Ukraine) UKR | Andriy Kozhukhar | 8 | 0 | 8 | 0 | 0 | 0 |
Defenders
| 3 | DF | (Ukraine) UKR | Ivan Trubochkin | 26 | 0 | 24+1 | 0 | 1 | 0 |
| 4 | DF | (Ukraine) UKR | Artem Yarmolenko | 2 | 0 | 1+1 | 0 | 0 | 0 |
| 5 | DF | (Ukraine) UKR | Dmytro Ryzhuk | 32 | 2 | 31 | 2 | 1 | 0 |
| 8 | DF | (Ukraine) UKR | Oleksandr Holikov | 9 | 0 | 9 | 0 | 0 | 0 |
| 15 | DF | (Ukraine) UKR | Hlib Hrachov | 31 | 3 | 28+1 | 2 | 2 | 1 |
| 23 | DF | (Ukraine) UKR | Denys Norenkov | 18 | 0 | 15+2 | 0 | 1 | 0 |
| 33 | DF | (Ukraine) UKR | Andriy Mischenko | 13 | 0 | 11+1 | 0 | 0+1 | 0 |
| 77 | DF | (Ukraine) UKR | Oleh Ostapenko | 10 | 0 | 5+4 | 0 | 1 | 0 |
Midfielders
| 7 | MF | (Ukraine) UKR | Mykola Musolitin | 26 | 2 | 14+10 | 2 | 2 | 0 |
| 9 | MF | (Ukraine) UKR | Volodymyr Arzhanov | 12 | 0 | 12 | 0 | 0 | 0 |
| 10 | MF | (Ukraine) UKR | Vitaliy Hoshkoderya | 12 | 1 | 12 | 1 | 0 | 0 |
| 11 | MF | (Ukraine) UKR | Yevhen Morozenko | 9 | 0 | 9 | 0 | 0 | 0 |
| 13 | MF | (Ukraine) UKR | Artem Chorniy | 33 | 4 | 23+8 | 2 | 2 | 2 |
| 20 | MF | (Ukraine) UKR | Ruslan Babenko | 31 | 2 | 29+1 | 2 | 0+1 | 0 |
| 21 | MF | (Ukraine) UKR | Vladyslav Khamelyuk | 10 | 0 | 5+5 | 0 | 0 | 0 |
| 34 | MF | (Ukraine) UKR | Volodymyr Tanchyk | 16 | 3 | 16 | 3 | 0 | 0 |
Forwards
| 22 | FW | (Ukraine) UKR | Andriy Shtohrin | 12 | 0 | 1+10 | 0 | 1 | 0 |
| 24 | FW | (Russia) RUS | Vasili Pavlov | 15 | 3 | 3+12 | 3 | 0 | 0 |
| 25 | FW | (Ukraine) UKR | Volodymyr Koval | 24 | 3 | 18+5 | 2 | 0+1 | 1 |
| 98 | FW | (Ukraine) UKR | Dmytro Semeniv | 14 | 1 | 4+9 | 1 | 0+1 | 0 |
| 99 | FW | (Iceland) ISL | Árni Vilhjálmsson | 14 | 7 | 12+2 | 7 | 0 | 0 |
Players transferred out during the season
| 6 | MF | (Ukraine) UKR | Dmytro Leonov | 11 | 0 | 8+3 | 0 | 0 | 0 |
| 8 | MF | (Ukraine) UKR | Oleksiy Savchenko | 16 | 1 | 14 | 1 | 2 | 0 |
| 9 | FW | (Ukraine) UKR | Anatoliy Didenko | 8 | 0 | 6+1 | 0 | 1 | 0 |
| 10 | MF | (Ukraine) UKR | Vladyslav Khomutov | 1 | 0 | 0 | 0 | 0+1 | 0 |
| 11 | MF | (Ukraine) UKR | Yevhen Smirnov | 14 | 1 | 12 | 1 | 2 | 0 |
| 17 | MF | (Ukraine) UKR | Artur Karnoza | 11 | 0 | 0+9 | 0 | 2 | 0 |
| 28 | FW | (Ukraine) UKR | Mykyta Tatarkov | 15 | 2 | 8+6 | 2 | 0+1 | 0 |
| 64 | FW | (Netherlands) NED | Robert Mutzers | 6 | 0 | 1+4 | 0 | 1 | 0 |
| 71 | GK | (Ukraine) UKR | Dmytro Bezruk | 2 | 0 | 0 | 0 | 2 | 0 |
| 97 | MF | (Ukraine) UKR | Yuriy Romanyuk | 10 | 0 | 9 | 0 | 1 | 0 |

Source: Competitions

Last updated: 8 June 2019

=== Goalscorers ===
| Rank | No. | Pos | Nat | Name | Premier League | Cup | Total |
|---|---|---|---|---|---|---|---|
| 1 | 99 | FW | (Iceland) | Árni Vilhjálmsson | 7 | 0 | 7 |
| 2 | 13 | MF | (Ukraine) | Artem Chorniy | 2 | 2 | 4 |
| 3 | 15 | DF | (Ukraine) | Hlib Hrachov | 2 | 1 | 3 |
| 3 | 24 | FW | (Russia) | Vasili Pavlov | 3 | 0 | 3 |
| 3 | 25 | FW | (Ukraine) | Volodymyr Koval | 2 | 1 | 3 |
| 3 | 34 | MF | (Ukraine) | Volodymyr Tanchyk | 3 | 0 | 3 |
| 7 | 5 | DF | (Ukraine) | Dmytro Ryzhuk | 2 | 0 | 2 |
| 7 | 7 | MF | (Ukraine) | Mykola Musolitin | 2 | 0 | 2 |
| 7 | 20 | MF | (Ukraine) | Ruslan Babenko | 2 | 0 | 2 |
| 7 | 28 | FW | (Ukraine) | Mykyta Tatarkov | 2 | 0 | 2 |
| 11 | 8 | MF | (Ukraine) | Oleksiy Savchenko | 1 | 0 | 1 |
| 11 | 10 | MF | (Ukraine) | Vitaliy Hoshkoderya | 1 | 0 | 1 |
| 11 | 11 | MF | (Ukraine) | Yevhen Smirnov | 1 | 0 | 1 |
| 11 | 98 | FW | (Ukraine) | Dmytro Semeniv | 1 | 0 | 1 |
| | | | | Own goal | 0 | 0 | 0 |
| | | | | Total | 28 | 4 | 32 |

Last updated: 8 June 2019

=== Clean sheets ===
| Rank | No. | Pos | Nat | Name | Premier League | Cup | Total |
|---|---|---|---|---|---|---|---|
| 1 | 1 | GK | (Ukraine) | Serhiy Litovchenko | 5 | 0 | 5 |
| 2 | 12 | GK | (Ukraine) | Andriy Kozhukhar | 1 | 0 | 1 |
| 2 | 71 | GK | (Ukraine) | Dmytro Bezruk | 1 | 0 | 1 |
| | | | | Total | 7 | 0 | 7 |

Last updated: 8 June 2019

=== Disciplinary record ===
| No. | Pos | Nat | Player | Premier League | | | Cup | | | Total | | |
| No. | Pos | Nat | Player | Booked | (yellow card) (yellow-red card) | Sent off (straight red) | Booked | (yellow card) (yellow-red card) | Sent off (straight red) | Booked | (yellow card) (yellow-red card) | Sent off (straight red) |
| 1 | GK | (Ukraine) | Serhiy Litovchenko | 3 | 0 | 0 | 0 | 0 | 0 | 3 | 0 | 0 |
| 3 | DF | (Ukraine) | Ivan Trubochkin | 4 | 0 | 0 | 0 | 0 | 0 | 4 | 0 | 0 |
| 4 | DF | (Ukraine) | Artem Yarmolenko | 1 | 0 | 0 | 0 | 0 | 0 | 1 | 0 | 0 |
| 5 | DF | (Ukraine) | Dmytro Ryzhuk | 6 | 1 | 0 | 0 | 0 | 0 | 6 | 1 | 0 |
| 6 | MF | (Ukraine) | Dmytro Leonov | 3 | 0 | 0 | 0 | 0 | 0 | 3 | 0 | 0 |
| 7 | MF | (Ukraine) | Mykola Musolitin | 4 | 0 | 0 | 0 | 0 | 0 | 4 | 0 | 0 |
| 8 | DF | (Ukraine) | Oleksandr Holikov | 1 | 0 | 0 | 0 | 0 | 0 | 1 | 0 | 0 |
| 8 | MF | (Ukraine) | Oleksiy Savchenko | 4 | 0 | 0 | 1 | 0 | 0 | 5 | 0 | 0 |
| 9 | MF | (Ukraine) | Volodymyr Arzhanov | 3 | 1 | 0 | 0 | 0 | 0 | 3 | 1 | 0 |
| 11 | MF | (Ukraine) | Yevhen Morozenko | 2 | 0 | 0 | 0 | 0 | 0 | 2 | 0 | 0 |
| 11 | MF | (Ukraine) | Yevhen Smirnov | 4 | 0 | 0 | 1 | 0 | 0 | 5 | 0 | 0 |
| 13 | MF | (Ukraine) | Artem Chorniy | 3 | 0 | 0 | 0 | 0 | 0 | 3 | 0 | 0 |
| 15 | DF | (Ukraine) | Hlib Hrachov | 7 | 0 | 0 | 0 | 0 | 0 | 7 | 0 | 0 |
| 17 | MF | (Ukraine) | Artur Karnoza | 0 | 0 | 0 | 1 | 0 | 0 | 1 | 0 | 0 |
| 20 | MF | (Ukraine) | Ruslan Babenko | 8 | 0 | 0 | 0 | 0 | 0 | 8 | 0 | 0 |
| 22 | FW | (Ukraine) | Andriy Shtohrin | 1 | 0 | 0 | 0 | 0 | 0 | 1 | 0 | 0 |
| 23 | DF | (Ukraine) | Denys Norenkov | 3 | 1 | 0 | 1 | 0 | 0 | 4 | 1 | 0 |
| 24 | FW | (Russia) | Vasili Pavlov | 3 | 0 | 0 | 0 | 0 | 0 | 3 | 0 | 0 |
| 25 | FW | (Ukraine) | Volodymyr Koval | 7 | 0 | 1 | 0 | 0 | 0 | 7 | 0 | 1 |
| 28 | FW | (Ukraine) | Mykyta Tatarkov | 1 | 0 | 0 | 0 | 0 | 0 | 1 | 0 | 0 |
| 33 | DF | (Ukraine) | Andriy Mischenko | 2 | 0 | 0 | 0 | 0 | 0 | 2 | 0 | 0 |
| 34 | MF | (Ukraine) | Volodymyr Tanchyk | 1 | 0 | 0 | 0 | 0 | 0 | 1 | 0 | 0 |
| 77 | DF | (Ukraine) | Oleh Ostapenko | 3 | 0 | 0 | 0 | 0 | 0 | 3 | 0 | 0 |
| 97 | MF | (Ukraine) | Yuriy Romanyuk | 2 | 0 | 0 | 0 | 0 | 0 | 2 | 0 | 0 |
| 98 | FW | (Ukraine) | Dmytro Semeniv | 1 | 0 | 0 | 0 | 0 | 0 | 1 | 0 | 0 |
| 99 | FW | (Iceland) | Árni Vilhjálmsson | 2 | 0 | 0 | 0 | 0 | 0 | 2 | 0 | 0 |
| | | | Total | 79 | 3 | 1 | 4 | 0 | 0 | 83 | 3 | 1 |

Last updated: 8 June 2019
