= 2013 Commonwealth of Independent States Cup =

CIS Cup, Кубок Содружества 2013

Tournament details
- Host country: Russia
- Dates: 18–27 January 2013
- Teams: 12
- Venue(s): 1 (in 1 host city)

Final positions
- Champions: Russia (2nd title)
- Runners-up: Ukraine

Tournament statistics
- Matches played: 34
- Goals scored: 105 (3.09 per match)
- Top scorer(s): (Russia) Andrei Panyukov (6 goals)

2013 Commonwealth of Independent States Cup was the 21st annual Commonwealth of Independent States Cup since its establishment in 1993. It was hosted in Saint Petersburg, Russia between 18 and 27 January 2013.

Saint Petersburg hosted the event for the fourth time, with all matches being held in a single venue (Saint Petersburg Sports and Concert Complex). All participating nations were represented by their youth (U20/U21) national teams.

== Format ==
- Group stage

Twelve teams were divided into three groups of four. The top two of each group qualified automatically for a play-off along with the two best third placed teams. The other third placed team along with the three bottom participants out of each group proceed to the play-off which would place its participants 9th through 12th places.

- Playoffs

The winners of the quarter finals advanced further into semi-finals, while the other four less fortunate entered play-off for the fifth place. Next the winners of the semi-finals advanced to the final, while the other two participants played for the third place. Simultaneously the winners of the play-off for the fifth place continued to the fifth place match, while the other two played for the seventh place.

== Participants ==
The following 12 teams, shown with age of youth national team, took part in the tournament:

Team	Coach	Notes	Participation
Russia U21	(Russia) Nikolai Pisarev	Host	11th
Ukraine U21	(Ukraine) Serhiy Kovalets		2nd
Belarus U21	(Belarus) Aleksey Vergeyenko		2nd
Lithuania U21	(Lithuania) Mindaugas Neoras		2nd
Latvia U21	(Latvia) Marians Pahars		2nd
Estonia U21	(Estonia) Martin Reim		2nd
Moldova U21	(Moldova) Alexandru Curteian		2nd
Kazakhstan U21	(Belarus) Sergei Borovsky		2nd
Uzbekistan U20	(Uzbekistan) Ahmadjon Musaev		1st
Tajikistan U20	(Tajikistan) Mubin Ergashev		2nd
Turkmenistan U20	(Turkmenistan) Röwşen Muhadow		2nd
Kyrgyzstan U20	(Kyrgyzstan) Anarbek Ormombekov		2nd

== Group stage ==
=== Group A ===
Team	Pld	W	D	L	GF	GA	GD	Pts
Belarus	3	3	0	0	10	3	+7	9
Tajikistan	3	2	0	1	4	5	−1	6
Latvia	3	1	0	2	1	4	−3	3
Estonia	3	0	0	3	1	4	−3	0

==== Results ====
All subsequent times UTC+3

18 January 2013
13:00

Belarus	3–0	Latvia
Bykov 37'; Saroka 71'; Kavalewski 90'	Report

SKK Peterburgsky, Saint Petersburg
Attendance: 300
Referee: Vladimir Rogulev (Russia)
18 January 2013
15:15

Estonia	0–1	Tajikistan
	Report	Ergashev 88'

SKK Peterburgsky, Saint Petersburg
Attendance: 300
Referee: Kirill Levnikov (Russia)

19 January 2013
16:30

Estonia	1–2	Belarus
Anier 78'	Report	Bombel 77'; Bykov 87'

SKK Peterburgsky, Saint Petersburg
Attendance: 300
Referee: Vladimir Seldyakov (Russia)
19 January 2013
19:00

Tajikistan	1–0	Latvia
Nazarov 39'	Report

SKK Peterburgsky, Saint Petersburg
Attendance: 300
Referee: Denis Shpilev (Russia)

21 January 2013
12:00

Belarus	5–2	Tajikistan
Lyahchylin 25' (pen.); Nikitin 34'; Vasilewski 65'; Novik 72'; Signevich 89'	Report	Gaforov 17'; Davronov 88' (pen.)

SKK Peterburgsky, Saint Petersburg
Attendance: 300
Referee: Anton Anopa (Russia)
21 January 2013
14:15

Latvia	1–0	Estonia
Svārups 78'	Report

SKK Peterburgsky, Saint Petersburg
Attendance: 500
Referee: Vitaly Rushakov (Russia)

=== Group B ===
Team	Pld	W	D	L	GF	GA	GD	Pts
Russia	3	1	2	0	9	5	+4	5
Uzbekistan	3	1	2	0	5	4	+1	5
Kazakhstan	3	1	0	2	6	9	−3	3
Kyrgyzstan	3	0	2	1	3	5	−2	2

==== Results ====
All subsequent times UTC+3

18 January 2013
17:30

Kyrgyzstan	1–3	Kazakhstan
Mambetaliev 42'	Report	Lunin 5'; Islamkhan 84' (pen.); Murtazayev 90'

SKK Peterburgsky, Saint Petersburg
Attendance: 300
Referee: Vyacheslav Kharlamov (Russia)
18 January 2013
20:00

Russia	2–2	Uzbekistan
Bocharov 12'; Mahmudov 30' (pen.)	Report	Kozak 10'; Iskanderov 39'

SKK Peterburgsky, Saint Petersburg
Attendance: 3,000
Referee: Aleksei Matyunin (Russia)

20 January 2013
12:00

Uzbekistan	1–0	Kazakhstan
Iskanderov 71'	Report

SKK Peterburgsky, Saint Petersburg
Attendance: 300
Referee: Dmitri Veselov (Russia)
20 January 2013
19:00

Russia	0–0	Kyrgyzstan
	Report

SKK Peterburgsky, Saint Petersburg
Attendance: 1,500
Referee: Sergey Kostevich (Russia)

21 January 2013
16:30

Kyrgyzstan	2–2	Uzbekistan
Kichin 41'; Sharipov 57'	Report	Toshpulatov 25'; Khakimov 71'

SKK Peterburgsky, Saint Petersburg
Attendance: 500
Referee: Vladimir Rogulev (Russia)
21 January 2013
19:00

Russia	7–3	Kazakhstan
Panyukov 2', 85', 90+4' (pen.); Obukhov 13', 36' (pen.); Mitrishev 72', 90+2'	Report	Lunin 27'; Kalizhanov 31'; Islamkhan 91'

SKK Peterburgsky, Saint Petersburg
Attendance: 1,000
Referee: Kirill Levnikov (Russia)

=== Group C ===
Team	Pld	W	D	L	GF	GA	GD	Pts
Ukraine	3	3	0	0	10	0	+10	9
Lithuania	3	1	1	1	2	3	−1	4
Moldova	3	1	0	2	2	5	−3	3
Turkmenistan	3	0	1	2	1	7	−6	1

==== Results ====
All subsequent times UTC+3

19 January 2013
12:00

Ukraine	3–0	Lithuania
Noyok 10'; Polyarus 73'; Koval 90'	Report

SKK Peterburgsky, Saint Petersburg
Attendance: 300
Referee: Mikhail Belov (Russia)
19 January 2013
14:15

Moldova	2–1	Turkmenistan
Milinceanu 60'; Solomin 63'	Report	Durdyýew 56'

SKK Peterburgsky, Saint Petersburg
Attendance: 300
Referee: German Kravchenko (Russia)

20 January 2013
14:15

Moldova	0–2	Ukraine
	Report	Koval 32'; Ryzhuk 72'

SKK Peterburgsky, Saint Petersburg
Attendance: 300
Referee: Vladimir Moskalyov (Russia)
20 January 2013
16:30

Lithuania	0–0	Turkmenistan
	Report

SKK Peterburgsky, Saint Petersburg
Attendance: 500
Referee: Sergei Kulikov (Russia)

22 January 2013
12:00

Ukraine	5–0	Turkmenistan
Ivanko 20', 29'; Filippov 43'; Yakovenko 52', 83'	Report

SKK Peterburgsky, Saint Petersburg
Attendance: 150
Referee: Vyacheslav Kharlamov (Russia)
22 January 2013
14:15

Lithuania	2–0	Moldova
Kazlauskas 36', 69'	Report

SKK Peterburgsky, Saint Petersburg
Attendance: 200
Referee: Aleksei Matyunin (Russia)

== Consolation round ==
=== Bracket ===
9th – 12th place (24 Jan)
Estonia	2
Turkmenistan	1
Kyrgyzstan (p)	1
Latvia	1

9th place match (26 Jan)
Estonia	2
Kyrgyzstan (p)	2
11th place match (26 Jan)
Turkmenistan	0
Latvia	4

=== Places 9 to 12 ===
24 January 2013
16:30

Estonia	2–1	Turkmenistan
Antonov 75'; Liivamägi 90' (pen.)	Report	Tursunow 45'

SKK Peterburgsky, Saint Petersburg
Attendance: 300
Referee: Denis Shpilev (Russia)
24 January 2013
19:00

Kyrgyzstan	1–1	Latvia
Kozubaev 58'	Report	Jermolajevs 80' (pen.)
Penalties
Sharipov (penalty scored); Sydykov (penalty scored); Otkeev (penalty scored); Shamshiev (penalty scored); Kichin (penalty scored)	5–3	(penalty missed) Barinovs; (penalty scored) Kļuškins; (penalty scored) Jermolajevs; (penalty scored) Hmizs

SKK Peterburgsky, Saint Petersburg
Attendance: 300
Referee: German Kravchenko (Russia)

=== 11th place match ===
26 January 2013
16:30

Turkmenistan	0–4	Latvia
	Report	Kļuškins 22'; Svārups 51', 53'; Hmizs 68' (pen.)

SKK Peterburgsky, Saint Petersburg
Attendance: 500
Referee: Dmitri Veselov (Russia)

=== 9th place match ===
26 January 2013
19:00

Estonia	2–2	Kyrgyzstan
Junolainen 13'; Lepik 67'	Report	Kichin 29'; Sharipov 52'
Penalties
Liivamägi (penalty scored); Lepistu (penalty scored); Ingermann (penalty scored); Rättel (penalty missed); Lipin (penalty missed)	3–4	(penalty scored) Otkeev; (penalty scored) Sydykov; (penalty missed) Musabekov; (penalty scored) Shamshiev; (penalty scored) Kichin

SKK Peterburgsky, Saint Petersburg
Attendance: 300
Referee: Vitaly Rushakov (Russia)

== Final stages ==
=== Bracket ===
5th place match (27 Jan)
Kazakhstan	0
Moldova	1
7th place match (27 Jan)
Uzbekistan	2
Tajikistan	0

5th – 8th place (25 Jan)
Uzbekistan	2
Kazakhstan	3
Tajikistan	1
Moldova	3

Quarterfinals (23 Jan)
Russia	2
Uzbekistan	0
Belarus	2
Kazakhstan	1
Tajikistan	1
Lithuania (p)	1
Ukraine	5
Moldova	0

Semifinals (25 Jan)
Russia	2
Belarus	1
Lithuania	1
Ukraine	2

Final (27 Jan)
Russia	4
Ukraine	2
3rd place match (27 Jan)
Belarus	2
Lithuania	0

=== Quarterfinals ===
23 January 2013
12:00

Belarus	2–1	Kazakhstan
Tkachuk 15' (o.g.); Bykov 46'	Report	Pasichnik 69'

SKK Peterburgsky, Saint Petersburg
Attendance: 300
Referee: Sergey Kostevich (Russia)
23 January 2013
14:15

Tajikistan	1–1	Lithuania
Gaforov 19'	Report	Verbickas 15' (pen.)
Penalties
Davronov (penalty scored); Asrorov (penalty scored); Payzov (penalty missed); Nazarov (penalty missed)	2–4	(penalty scored) Daukša; (penalty scored) Verbickas; (penalty scored) Dapkus; (penalty scored) Spalvis

SKK Peterburgsky, Saint Petersburg
Attendance: 500
Referee: Vladimir Seldyakov (Russia)
23 January 2013
16:30

Ukraine	5–0	Moldova
Myakushko 5'; Karavayev 38'; Yakovenko 56'; Meskhia 64'; Ivanko 90'	Report

SKK Peterburgsky, Saint Petersburg
Attendance: 300
Referee: Sergei Kulikov (Russia)
23 January 2013
19:00

Russia	2–0	Uzbekistan
Kayumov 30'; Panyukov 83'	Report

SKK Peterburgsky, Saint Petersburg
Attendance: 2,500
Referee: Mikhail Belov (Russia)

=== Places 5 to 8 ===
25 January 2013
12:00

Uzbekistan	2–3	Kazakhstan
Sergeev 9', 54'	Report	Murtazayev 4'; Ayaganov 19'; Ulshin 37'

SKK Peterburgsky, Saint Petersburg
Attendance: 300
Referee: Vladimir Moskalyov (Russia)
25 January 2013
14:15

Tajikistan	1–3	Moldova
Kurbonov 43'	Report	Carp 12', 56'; Nemerenco 80'

SKK Peterburgsky, Saint Petersburg
Attendance: 500
Referee: Anton Anopa (Russia)

=== Semifinals ===
25 January 2013
16:30

Lithuania	1–2	Ukraine
Nakrošius 5'	Report	Babenko 69' (pen.); Yakovenko 85'

SKK Peterburgsky, Saint Petersburg
Attendance: 800
Referee: Aleksei Matyunin (Russia)
25 January 2013
19:30

Russia	2–1	Belarus
Kayumov 30'; Bolov 57'	Report	Sazonovich 64'

SKK Peterburgsky, Saint Petersburg
Attendance: 4,000
Referee: Vyacheslav Kharlamov (Russia)

=== 7th place match ===
27 January 2013
12:00

Uzbekistan	2–0	Tajikistan
Kozak 54'; Makhsatalliev 68'	Report

SKK Peterburgsky, Saint Petersburg
Attendance: 500
Referee: Vladimir Seldyakov (Russia)

=== 5th place match ===
27 January 2013
14:15

Kazakhstan	0–1	Moldova
	Report	Solomin 47'

SKK Peterburgsky, Saint Petersburg
Attendance: 300
Referee: Sergei Kulikov (Russia)

=== 3rd place match ===
27 January 2013
16:30

Belarus	2–0	Lithuania
Novik 8'; Bykov 65'	Report

SKK Peterburgsky, Saint Petersburg
Attendance: 800
Referee: Kirill Levnikov (Russia)

=== Final ===
27 January 2013
19:00

Russia	4–2	Ukraine
Iashvili 5' (o.g.); Panyukov 37', 76'; Mahmudov 90+5' (pen.)	Report	Kalitvintsev 13'; Ivanko 64'

SKK Peterburgsky, Saint Petersburg
Attendance: 7,000
Referee: Mikhail Belov (Russia)

== Final standing ==
Rank	Team
1st place, gold medalist(s)	Russia
2nd place, silver medalist(s)	Ukraine
3rd place, bronze medalist(s)	Belarus
4	Lithuania
5	Moldova
6	Kazakhstan
7	Uzbekistan
8	Tajikistan
9	Kyrgyzstan
10	Estonia
11	Latvia
12	Turkmenistan

== Top scorers ==
Rank	Player	Team	Goals
1	(Russia) Andrei Panyukov	Russia	6
2	(Ukraine) Vitaliy Ivanko	Ukraine	4
2	(Ukraine) Yuriy Yakovenko	Ukraine	4
2	(Belarus) Artem Bykov	Belarus	4
5	(Latvia) Kaspars Svārups	Latvia	3
