= 2020 FC Dinamo Tbilisi season =

FC Dinamo Tbilisi
2020 season
- Chairman: Roman Pipia
- Manager: Kakhaber Chkhetiani (until 20 August); Xisco Muñoz (24 August - 20 December); Georgi Nemsadze (from 21 December)
- Stadium: Boris Paichadze Dinamo Arena
- Erovnuli Liga: Winners
- Georgian Cup: Third Round vs Saburtalo Tbilisi
- Super Cup: Runners Up vs Saburtalo Tbilisi
- UEFA Champions League: First qualifying round vs Tirana
- UEFA Europa League: Third qualifying round vs KÍ
- Top goalscorer: League: Nodar Kavtaradze (8); All: Nodar Kavtaradze (8)
- Highest home attendance: 3,000 vs Dinamo Batumi (8 March 2020)
- Lowest home attendance: 0 (7 games behind closed doors)
- Average home league attendance: 522 (10 December 2020)

The 2020 FC Dinamo Tbilisi season was the thirty-second successive season that FC Dinamo Tbilisi played in the top flight of Georgian football.

== Season events ==
On 7 January, Dinamo announced the departure of Serhiy Litovchenko, Mate Kvirkvia, Mykhaylo Shyshka and Levan Kutalia had all left the club after their contracts had expired. On the same day, Giorgi Papava extended his contract with Dinamo until the end of the 2021 season.

On 8 January, Dinamo announced the signing of Omar Migineishvili to a one-year contract.

On 15 January, Dinamo announced that captain Guja Rukhaia had left the club after his contract had expired, and that they had signed Irakli Bugridze from Beerschot on a contract until the end of the 2021 season.

On 18 January, Dinamo announced that Oleksandr Kapliyenko had left the club after his contract had expired.

On 29 January, Dinamo announced the signing of Simon Gbegnon from CD Mirandés to a two-year contract.

On 1 February, Dinamo announced the signing of Filip Oršula from Spartak Trnava to a two-year contract.

On 3 March, Lasha Atskureli, Tornike Jangidze and Tamaz Babunadze all joined Sioni Bolnisi on loan for the season.

On 11 March, the Erovnuli Liga was postponed until 1 April due to the COVID-19 pandemic, with the Georgian Cup being suspended the following day.

On 28 May, Dinamo announced the return of Levan Kharabadze after a loan spell with Zürich.

On 3 June, it was announced that the Erovnuli Liga season would resume on 25 June and would now consist of 2 rounds of matches instead of the initially planned 4.

On 22 June, Dinamo announced the signing of Giorgi Gabedava from Saburtalo Tbilisi on a contract until the end of the 2021 season.

On 24 June, Dinamo announced that Kwame Karikari had left the club after his contract had expired.

On 2 July, Dinamo announced that Levan Mchedlidze had left the club after his contract was terminated by mutual agreement.

On 18 July, Nika Sandokhadze left Dinamo to join Locomotive Tbilisi on loan for the remainder of the season.

On 14 August, Dinamo announced that Nika Ninua had left the club to sign for PAOK for an undisclosed fee.

On 20 August, Kakhaber Chkhetiani announced his departure as Head Coach of Dinamo.

On 24 August, Dinamo announced that Luka Lochoshvili had left the club to sign for Wolfsberger AC for an undisclosed fee.

On 4 September, Dinamo announced the return of Víctor Mongil from ATK on a contract until the end of the 2021 season.

On 5 September, Dinamo announced the return of Rodney Klooster from Inter Turku on a contract until the end of the season with the option for an additional two seasons.

On 7 October, Dinamo announced the signing of Davit Skhirtladze from Arka Gdynia on a contract until the end of the season, and Carlos Castro from RCD Mallorca until the end of the 2022 season.

On 20 December, Xisco Muñoz left Dinamo to take over the Head Coach position at Watford. The following day, 21 December, Georgi Nemsadze was appointed as the clubs new Head Coach.

== Squad ==
As of match played 10 December 2020

No.	Name	Nationality	Position	Date of birth (age)	Signed from	Signed in	Contract ends	Apps.	Goals
Goalkeepers
13	Omar Migineishvili	(Georgia (country))	GK	2 June 1984 (aged 36)	Saburtalo	2020		21	0
30	Roin Kvaskhvadze	(Georgia (country))	GK	31 May 1989 (aged 31)	Torpedo Kutaisi	2020		22	0
Defenders
2	Rodney Klooster	(Netherlands)	DF	26 November 1996 (aged 24)	Inter Turku	2020		5	0
3	Víctor Mongil	(Spain)	DF	21 July 1992 (aged 28)	ATK	2020	2021	64	1
5	Davit Kobouri	(Georgia (country))	DF	24 January 1998 (aged 22)	Academy	2015		118	2
16	Giorgi Kimadze	(Georgia (country))	DF	11 February 1992 (aged 28)	Torpedo Kutaisi	2019		34	0
19	Simon Gbegnon	(Togo)	DF	27 October 1992 (aged 28)	Mirandés	2020	2021	18	1
23	Irakli Azarovi	(Georgia (country))	DF	21 February 2002 (aged 18)	Academy	2019		14	0
24	Nodar Iashvili	(Georgia (country))	DF	24 January 1993 (aged 27)	Saburtalo	2019		57	1
25	Levan Kharabadze	(Georgia (country))	DF	26 January 2000 (aged 20)	Academy	2018		37	4
31	Ivan Trubochkin	(Ukraine)	DF	17 March 1993 (aged 27)	Olimpik Donetsk	2020		7	0
Midfielders
6	Bakar Kardava	(Georgia (country))	MF	4 October 1994 (aged 26)	Tskhinvali	2017		96	4
7	Giorgi Zaria	(Georgia (country))	MF	14 July 1997 (aged 23)	Dinamo Batumi	2015		78	7
8	Giorgi Kukhianidze	(Georgia (country))	MF	1 July 1992 (aged 28)	Torpedo Kutaisi	2019		42	4
11	Akaki Shulaia	(Georgia (country))	MF	6 September 1996 (aged 24)	Merani Martvili	2017		97	16
15	Giorgi Papava	(Georgia (country))	MF	16 February 1993 (aged 27)	Rustavi	2019		126	3
21	Giorgi Kutsia	(Georgia (country))	MF	27 October 1999 (aged 21)	Academy	2017		64	5
22	Irakli Bugridze	(Georgia (country))	MF	3 January 1998 (aged 22)	K Beerschot VA	2020	2021	13	1
26	Giorgi Abuashvili	(Georgia (country))	MF	8 February 2003 (aged 17)	Academy	2019		2	0
27	Anzor Mekvabishvili	(Georgia (country))	MF	5 June 2001 (aged 19)	Academy	2020		11	0
38	Nodar Kavtaradze	(Russia)	MF	2 January 1993 (aged 27)	Torpedo Kutaisi	2019		35	14
Forwards
9	Giorgi Gabedava	(Georgia (country))	FW	3 October 1989 (aged 31)	Saburtalo Tbilisi	2020	2021	12	5
12	Davit Skhirtladze	(Georgia (country))	FW	16 March 1993 (aged 27)	Viborg	2021		5	3
17	Pernambuco	(Brazil)	FW	28 April 1998 (aged 22)	on loan from Lviv	2020	2020	18	3
18	Filip Oršula	(Slovakia)	FW	25 February 1993 (aged 27)	Spartak Trnava	2020	2021	9	0
20	Tornike Kapanadze	(Georgia (country))	FW	4 June 1992 (aged 28)	Torpedo Kutaisi	2020		13	3
29	Tornike Akhvlediani	(Georgia (country))	FW	24 July 1999 (aged 21)	Zestaponi	2020		3	0
	Carlos Castro	(Spain)	FW	1 June 1995 (aged 25)	RCD Mallorca	2020		0	0
Players away on loan
	Giorgi Mamardashvili	(Georgia (country))	GK	29 September 2000 (aged 20)	Academy	2018		0	0
	Tamaz Babunadze	(Georgia (country))	MF	4 January 2000 (aged 20)	Academy	2018		8	0
	Giorgi Moistsrapishvili	(Georgia (country))	MF	29 September 2001 (aged 19)	Academy	2020		0	0
	Arfang Daffé	(Senegal)	MF	24 June 1991 (aged 29)	Nassaji Mazandaran	2019		19	2
	Mikheil Ergemlidze	(Georgia (country))	FW	28 September 1999 (aged 21)	Academy	2017		29	1
Left during the season
3	Luka Lochoshvili	(Georgia (country))	DF	29 May 1998 (aged 22)	Dynamo Kyiv	2020		36	1
32	Nika Ninua	(Georgia (country))	MF	22 June 1999 (aged 21)	Academy	2016		95	14
	Levan Mchedlidze	(Georgia (country))	FW	24 March 1990 (aged 30)	Empoli	2019	2020	5	1
	Kwame Karikari	(Ghana)	FW	20 January 1992 (aged 28)	Neftçi	2019	2020	11	3

== Transfers ==
=== In ===
Date	Position	Nationality	Name	From	Fee	Ref.
8 January 2020	GK	(Georgia (country))	Omar Migineishvili	Saburtalo Tbilisi	Undisclosed	
15 January 2020	MF	(Georgia (country))	Irakli Bugridze	Beerschot	Undisclosed	
29 January 2020	DF	(Togo)	Simon Gbegnon	CD Mirandés	Undisclosed	
31 January 2020	DF	(Ukraine)	Ivan Trubochkin	Olimpik Donetsk	Undisclosed	
1 February 2020	FW	(Slovakia)	Filip Oršula	Spartak Trnava	Undisclosed	
22 June 2020	FW	(Georgia (country))	Giorgi Gabedava	Saburtalo Tbilisi	Undisclosed	
4 September 2020	DF	(Spain)	Víctor Mongil	ATK	Undisclosed	
5 September 2020	DF	(Netherlands)	Rodney Klooster	Inter Turku	Undisclosed	
7 October 2020	MF	(Spain)	Carlos Castro	RCD Mallorca	Undisclosed	
7 October 2020	FW	(Georgia (country))	Davit Skhirtladze	Arka Gdynia	Undisclosed	

=== Out ===
Date	Position	Nationality	Name	To	Fee	Ref.
14 August 2020	MF	(Georgia (country))	Nika Ninua	PAOK	Undisclosed	
24 August 2020	DF	(Georgia (country))	Luka Lochoshvili	Wolfsberger AC	Undisclosed	

=== Loans out ===
Date from	Position	Nationality	Name	To	Date to	Ref.
10 January 2019	DF	(Georgia (country))	Levan Kharabadze	Zürich	28 May 2020	
1 March 2020	FW	(Senegal)	Arfang Daffé	Samtredia	30 June 2020	
3 March 2020	DF	(Georgia (country))	Lasha Atskureli	Sioni Bolnisi	31 December 2020	
3 March 2020	DF	(Georgia (country))	Tornike Jangidze	Sioni Bolnisi	31 December 2020	
3 March 2020	FW	(Georgia (country))	Tamaz Babunadze	Sioni Bolnisi	31 December 2020	
18 July 2020	DF	(Georgia (country))	Nika Sandokhadze	Locomotive Tbilisi	31 December 2020	
19 July 2020	FW	(Senegal)	Arfang Daffé	Samtredia	31 December 2020	

=== Released ===
Date	Position	Nationality	Name	Joined	Date	Ref.
7 January 2020	GK	(Ukraine)	Serhiy Litovchenko	Volyn Lutsk		
7 January 2020	MF	(Georgia (country))	Mate Kvirkvia	Samtredia		
7 January 2020	MF	(Ukraine)	Mykhaylo Shyshka	Samtredia		
7 January 2020	FW	(Georgia (country))	Levan Kutalia	Irtysh Pavlodar		
15 January 2020	MF	(Georgia (country))	Guja Rukhaia	Samtredia		
18 January 2020	DF	(Ukraine)	Oleksandr Kapliyenko	Tambov	9 February 2020	
24 June 2020	FW	(Ghana)	Kwame Karikari	Hapoel Petah Tikva		
2 July 2020	FW	(Georgia (country))	Levan Mchedlidze	Dinamo Batumi	1 March 2021	
31 December 2020	DF	(Netherlands)	Rodney Klooster	TEC	1 July 2023	
31 December 2020	DF	(Ukraine)	Ivan Trubochkin	Dinaz Vyshhorod	26 March 2021	
31 December 2020	FW	(Senegal)	Arfang Daffé	Al-Shabab	11 September 2021	

== Friendlies ==
18 January 2020	Dinamo Tbilisi	1 – 3	Voluntari	Turkey
GET (UTC+4)		Report

22 January 2020	Dinamo Tbilisi	2 – 3	Arda Kardzhali	Turkey
GET (UTC+4)		Report

30 January 2020	Dinamo Tbilisi	2 – 3	Wisła Kraków	Turkey
GET (UTC+4)		Report

6 February 2020	Dinamo Tbilisi	2 – 2	Radnik Surdulica	Turkey
GET (UTC+4)		Report

9 February 2020	Dinamo Tbilisi	0 – 1	Mladost Doboj Kakanj	Turkey
GET (UTC+4)		Report

12 February 2020	Dinamo Tbilisi	1 – 0	Oleksandriya	Turkey
GET (UTC+4)		Report

== Competitions ==
=== Overview ===
Competition	First match	Last match	Starting round	Final position	Record							
Competition	First match	Last match	Starting round	Final position	Pld	W	D	L	GF	GA	GD	Win %
Erovnuli Liga	27 February 2021	4 December 2021	Matchday 1	Winners	18	12	4	2	33	9	+24	66.67
Georgian Cup	21 September 2020	21 September 2020	Third round	Third Round	1	0	0	1	0	1	−1	0.00
Super Cup	23 February 2020	23 February 2020	Final	Runners-Up	1	0	0	1	0	1	−1	0.00
UEFA Champions League	19 August 2020	19 August 2020	First qualifying round	First qualifying round	1	0	0	1	0	2	−2	0.00
UEFA Europa League	17 September 2020	24 September 2020	First qualifying round	Second qualifying round	2	1	0	1	2	6	−4	50.00
Total					23	13	4	6	35	19	+16	56.52

Last updated: 4 December 2021
Source: Competitions

=== Super Cup ===
23 February 2020	Dinamo Tbilisi	0 – 1	Saburtalo Tbilisi	Tbilisi
17:00 GET (UTC+4)	Oršula (yellow card) 23'; Kutsia (yellow card) 87'	Report	Kokhreidze 14' (pen.); Lakvekheliani (yellow card) 39'; Kakubava (yellow card) 65'; Altunashvili (yellow card) 81'; Tsnobiladze (yellow card) 90+4'	Stadium: Mikheil Meskhi Stadium; Attendance: 2,000; Referee: Giorgi Kikacheishvili

=== Erovnuli Liga ===
==== Results summary ====
Overall								Home						Away					
Pld	W	D	L	GF	GA	GD	Pts	W	D	L	GF	GA	GD	W	D	L	GF	GA	GD
18	12	4	2	33	9	+24	40	6	2	1	16	5	+11	6	2	1	17	4	+13

Last updated: 10 December 2020.
Source: See Results

==== Results by round ====
Round	1	2	3	4	5	6	7	8	9	10	11	12	15	13	14	17	16	18
Ground	H	H	A	H	A	H	A	H	A	A	A	H	A	H	A	H	A	H
Result	D	D	W	W	D	L	W	W	W	D	W	W	W	W	W	W	L	W
Position	5	6	2	1	2	3	2	2	1	2	1	2	1	1	1	1	1	1

Source: See Results
A = Away; H = Home; W = Win; D = Draw; L = Loss

==== Results ====
29 February 2020 1	Dinamo Tbilisi	0 – 0	Telavi	Tbilisi
18:00 GET (UTC+4)	Kardava (yellow card) 62' (yellow-red card) 90+5'; Kutsia (yellow card) 87'	Report	Rukhadze (yellow card) 28'	Stadium: Boris Paichadze Dinamo Arena; Attendance: 1,200; Referee: Giorgi Kruashvili

8 March 2020 2	Dinamo Tbilisi	1 – 1	Dinamo Batumi	Tbilisi
18:00 GET (UTC+4)	Ninua 55' (pen.)	Report	Jighauri 50'	Stadium: Boris Paichadze Dinamo Arena; Attendance: 3,000; Referee: Papuna Matcharadze

25 June 2020 3	Saburtalo	0 – 3	Dinamo Tbilisi	Tbilisi
18:00 GET (UTC+4)	Kakubava (yellow card) 16'; Kokhreidze (yellow card) 62'; Macharashvili (yellow card) 70'; Lakvekheliani (red card) 87'	Report	Kutsia 17'; Lochoshvili (yellow card) 20'; Kapanadze 50'; Bugridze 54'; Mekvabishvili (yellow card) 61'; Trubochkin (yellow card) 86'	Stadium: Mikheil Meskhi Stadium; Attendance: 0 Referee: Giorgi Vadachkoria

3 July 2020 4	Dinamo Tbilisi	4 – 0	Locomotive Tbilisi	Tbilisi
21:00 GET (UTC+4)	Trubochkin (yellow card) 25'; Kobouri 61'; Kapanadze 72' (pen.); Kirkitadze 79' (o.g.); Pernambuco 90'	Report	Ubilava (yellow card) 23' (yellow-red card) 42'	Stadium: Boris Paichadze Dinamo Arena; Attendance: 0 Referee: Goga Kikacheishvili

12 July 2020 5	Torpedo Kutaisi	0 – 0	Dinamo Tbilisi	Kutaisi
21:00 GET (UTC+4)	Tabatadze (yellow card) 41'; Grigalashvili (red card) 69'	Report	Bugridze (yellow card) 34'; Kavtaradze (yellow card) 55'; Kimadze (red card) 69'; Kobouri (yellow card) 79'	Stadium: Ramaz Shengelia Stadium; Attendance: 0 Referee: Giorgi Kruashvili

19 July 2020 6	Dinamo Tbilisi	1 – 2	Dila Gori	Tbilisi
21:00 GET (UTC+4)	Azarovi (yellow card) 17'; Kutsia 68' (pen.); Bugridze (yellow card) 69'; Kavtaradze (yellow card) 73'; Akhvlediani (yellow card) 80'; Lochoshvili (yellow card) 83'; Trubochkin (yellow card) 90+4'	Report	Gagnidze 37'; Maisashvili (yellow card) 46' (yellow-red card) 63'; Gugeshashvili (yellow card) 73'; Kovtalyuk 90+2'; Latsabidze (yellow card) 90+6'	Stadium: Boris Paichadze Dinamo Arena; Attendance: 0 Referee: Irakli Kvirikashvili

25 July 2020 7	Samtredia	0 – 4	Dinamo Tbilisi	Samtredia
18:00 GET (UTC+4)	Gurbanov (yellow card) 32'	Report	Kavtaradze 17', 61'; Pernambuco 20'; Kapanadze 22'	Stadium: Erosi Manjgaladze Stadium; Attendance: 800; Referee: Papuna Matcharadze

1 August 2020 8	Dinamo Tbilisi	1 – 0	Chikhura Sachkhere	Tbilisi
20:30 GET (UTC+4)	Kukhianidze 68'	Report		Stadium: Boris Paichadze Dinamo Arena; Attendance: 500; Referee: Davit Kharitonashvili

7 August 2020 9	Merani Tbilisi	1 – 2	Dinamo Tbilisi	Tbilisi
21:00 GET (UTC+4)	Kakhelishvili (yellow card) 21'; Kakashvili (yellow card) 47'; Getsadze 90+1' (pen.)	Report	Kobouri 45+3'; Kapanadze (yellow card) 55'; Gbegnon 70'; Gabedava (yellow card) 81'	Stadium: Mikheil Meskhi-2 Stadium; Attendance: 300; Referee: Tariel Rukhaia

12 August 2020 10	Telavi	0 – 0	Dinamo Tbilisi	Telavi
21:00 GET (UTC+4)	Chukwurah (yellow card) 27'; Tolordava (yellow card) 37'; Chabradze (yellow card) 43'	Report	Shulaia (yellow card) 24'; Kutsia (yellow card) 60'; Kukhianidze (yellow card) 86'	Stadium: Caucasus Arena; Attendance: 1,300; Referee: Giorgi Kruashvili

12 September 2020 11	Dinamo Batumi	1 – 3	Dinamo Tbilisi	Kutaisi
21:00 GET (UTC+4)	Jighauri (penalty missed) 64'; Gonçalves (yellow card) 77'; Tevdoradze 89' (pen.)	Report	Gabedava 38'; Kardava 45'; Zaria 52'; Kavtaradze (yellow card) 72'; Kutsia (yellow card) 87'	Stadium: Ramaz Shengelia Stadium; Attendance: 0 Referee: Irakli Kvirikashvili

23 October 2020 12	Dinamo Tbilisi	3 – 1	Saburtalo	Tbilisi
20:00 GET (UTC+4)	Papava (yellow card) 2' (yellow-red card) 41' (goal) 21'; Kavtaradze 12' (pen.), 40'; Kimadze (yellow card) 45+1'; Mongil (yellow card) 71' (yellow-red card) 90+7'	Report	Mali (yellow card) 11'; Tsnobiladze (yellow card) 13'; Margvelashvili 71' (pen.) (penalty missed) 90+8'; Nazaré (yellow card) 87'; Tera (yellow card) 90+2'	Stadium: Boris Paichadze Dinamo Arena; Attendance: 0 Referee: Goga Kikacheishvili

3 November 2020 15	Dila Gori	0 – 3	Dinamo Tbilisi	Gori
18:00 GET (UTC+4)	Maisashvili (yellow card) 7'; Gugeshashvili (yellow card) 82'	Report	Gabedava 5'; Iashvili 15'; Kimadze (yellow card) 29'; Mekvabishvili (yellow card) 44'; Kavtaradze (yellow card) 71'; Skhirtladze 83' (pen.)	Stadium: Tengiz Burjanadze Stadium; Attendance: 0 Referee: Irakli Kvirikashvili

8 November 2020 13	Locomotive Tbilisi	0 – 2	Dinamo Tbilisi	Tbilisi
18:00 GET (UTC+4)	Dartsmelia (yellow card) 18'; Sikharulidze (yellow card) 76'; Gabadze (yellow card) 90+4'	Report	Kardava (yellow card) 47'; Mekvabishvili (yellow card) 59'; Skhirtladze 77', 83'	Stadium: Mikheil Meskhi-2 Stadium; Attendance: 0 Referee: Giorgi Kruashvili

26 November 2020 14	Dinamo Tbilisi	2 – 1	Torpedo Kutaisi	Tbilisi
17:00 GET (UTC+4)	Klooster (yellow card) 52'; Kavtaradze 64' (pen.), 85' (pen.); Mongil (yellow card) 76'	Report	Adamadze (yellow card) 63'; Pantsulaia 67'; Janelidze (yellow card) 73' (yellow-red card) 84'	Stadium: Boris Paichadze Dinamo Arena; Attendance: 0 Referee: Davit Kharitonashvili

30 November 2020 17	Chikhura Sachkhere	2 – 0	Dinamo Tbilisi	Tbilisi
18:30 GET (UTC+4)	Kakhabrishvili 17'; Kikabidze 85'; Gvazava (yellow card) 90+4'	Report	Papava (yellow card) 60'	Stadium: Mikheil Meskhi-2 Stadium; Attendance: 0 Referee: Bakur Ninua

5 December 2020 16	Dinamo Tbilisi	1 – 0	Samtredia	Tbilisi
14:00 GET (UTC+4)	Kavtaradze 41' (pen.); Klooster (yellow card) 44'	Report	Rukhaia (yellow card) 79'; Pavišić (yellow card) 87'	Stadium: Boris Paichadze Dinamo Arena; Attendance: 0 Referee: Jener Khorava

10 December 2020 18	Dinamo Tbilisi	3 – 0	Merani Tbilisi	Tbilisi
14:00 GET (UTC+4)	Kavtaradze 25' (pen.); Gabedava 41', 77'	Report	Tevdoradze (yellow card) 24'	Stadium: Boris Paichadze Dinamo Arena; Attendance: 0 Referee: Davit Sanodze

==== League table ====
Pos	Team	Pld	W	D	L	GF	GA	GD	Pts	Qualification or relegation
1	Dinamo Tbilisi (C)	18	12	4	2	33	9	+24	40	Qualification for the Champions League first qualifying round
2	Dinamo Batumi	18	10	6	2	29	14	+15	36	Qualification for the Europa Conference League first qualifying round
3	Dila Gori	18	8	6	4	29	17	+12	30	Qualification for the Europa Conference League first qualifying round
4	Locomotive Tbilisi	18	8	5	5	30	23	+7	29	
5	Saburtalo	18	7	6	5	28	21	+7	27	

Source: Erovnuli Liga, Soccerway
Rules for classification: 1) Points; 2) Head-to-head points; 3) Head-to-head goal difference; 4) Head-to-head goals scored; 5) Head-to-head away goals scored (only if two teams); 6) Goal difference; 7) Goals scored.
FC Gagra of the Erovnuli Liga 2 are the winners of the 2020 Georgian Cup and qualify for the first qualifying round of the Europa Conference League.
(C) Champions

=== Georgian Cup ===
21 September 2020 Third round	Saburtalo Tbilisi	1 – 0	Dinamo Tbilisi	Tbilisi
15:30 GET (UTC+4)	Margvelashvili 52'; Kavtaradze (yellow card) 73'; Grigalashvili (yellow card) 74'; Mali (yellow card) 87'	Report	Klooster (yellow card) 16'; Khvadagiani (yellow card) 71'; Kutsia (yellow card) 85'; Migineishvili (yellow card) 90+2'	Stadium: Mikheil Meskhi Stadium; Attendance: 0 Referee: Giorgi Vadachkoria

=== UEFA Champions League ===
==== Qualifying rounds ====
19 August 2020 First qualifying round 1st leg	Dinamo Tbilisi (Georgia (country))	0 – 2	(Albania) Tirana	Tbilisi, Georgia
21:00 GET (UTC+4)	Lochoshvili (yellow card) 23'; Papava (yellow card) 39'; Shulaia (yellow card) 68'	Report	Torassa (yellow card) 44' (goal) 45+4'; Toshevski (yellow card) 72'; Çelhaka (yellow card) 85'; Ismailgeci 86'	Stadium: Boris Paichadze Dinamo Arena; Attendance: 0 Referee: Roomer Tarajev (Estonia)

=== UEFA Europa League ===
==== Qualifying rounds ====
17 September 2020 Second qualifying round	Connah's Quay Nomads (Wales)	0 – 1	(Georgia (country)) Dinamo Tbilisi	Wrexham, Wales
22:00 GET (UTC+4)	Brass (yellow card) 36'; Own (yellow card) 38'; Insall (yellow card) 45+4'; Farquharson (yellow card) 53'; Davies (yellow card) 69'	Report	Zaria (yellow card) 46'; Kimadze (yellow card) 64'; Gabedava 90+7' (pen.)	Stadium: Racecourse Ground; Attendance: 0 Referee: Alain Durieux (Luxembourg)
Note: Connah's Quay Nomads played their home match at Racecourse Ground, Wrexham, instead of their regular stadium Deeside Stadium, Connah's Quay, which did not meet UEFA requirements.

24 September 2020 Third qualifying round	KÍ (Faroe Islands)	6 – 1	(Georgia (country)) Dinamo Tbilisi	Tórshavn, Faroe Islands
22:00 GET (UTC+4)	Pavlović 22'; P.Johannesen (yellow card) 40' (goal) 58'; Klettskarð 60', 69', 73'; Andreasen (yellow card) 83'; J.Johannesen 85'	Report	Kavtaradze (yellow card) 17'; Gbegnon (yellow card) 27'; Pernambuco 71'	Stadium: Tórsvøllur; Attendance: 0 Referee: Thorvaldur Árnason (Iceland)
Note: KÍ played their home match at Tórsvøllur, Tórshavn, instead of their regular stadium Við Djúpumýrar, Klaksvík which did not meet UEFA requirements.

== Squad statistics ==
As of match played 10 December 2020

=== Appearances and goals ===
No.	Pos	Nat	Player	Total		Erovnuli Liga		Georgian Cup		Super Cup		UEFA Champions League		UEFA Europa League	
No.	Pos	Nat	Player	Apps	Goals	Apps	Goals	Apps	Goals	Apps	Goals	Apps	Goals	Apps	Goals
2	DF	(Netherlands) NED	Rodney Klooster	5	0	3	0	1	0	0	0	0	0	0+1	0
3	DF	(Spain) ESP	Víctor Mongil	5	0	4	0	1	0	0	0	0	0	0	0
5	DF	(Georgia (country)) GEO	Davit Kobouri	23	2	18	2	0+1	0	1	0	1	0	2	0
6	MF	(Georgia (country)) GEO	Bakar Kardava	14	1	9+1	1	0	0	1	0	1	0	2	0
7	MF	(Georgia (country)) GEO	Giorgi Zaria	8	1	1+5	1	0	0	0	0	0	0	2	0
8	MF	(Georgia (country)) GEO	Giorgi Kukhianidze	13	1	5+5	1	1	0	1	0	0	0	0+1	0
9	FW	(Georgia (country)) GEO	Giorgi Gabedava	12	5	5+4	4	0	0	0	0	0+1	0	2	1
11	MF	(Georgia (country)) GEO	Akaki Shulaia	9	0	2+5	0	0+1	0	0	0	1	0	0	0
12	FW	(Georgia (country)) GEO	Davit Skhirtladze	5	3	4+1	3	0	0	0	0	0	0	0	0
13	GK	(Georgia (country)) GEO	Omar Migineishvili	1	0	0	0	1	0	0	0	0	0	0	0
15	MF	(Georgia (country)) GEO	Giorgi Papava	20	1	16	1	0	0	1	0	1	0	2	0
16	DF	(Georgia (country)) GEO	Giorgi Kimadze	15	0	12	0	0	0	0	0	0+1	0	2	0
17	FW	(Brazil) BRA	Pernambuco	18	3	12+2	2	1	0	0	0	1	0	0+2	1
18	FW	(Slovakia) SVK	Filip Oršula	9	0	4+2	0	0	0	1	0	0	0	2	0
19	DF	(Togo) TOG	Simon Gbegnon	18	1	14	1	0	0	1	0	1	0	2	0
20	FW	(Georgia (country)) GEO	Tornike Kapanadze	13	3	6+4	3	1	0	0	0	1	0	0+1	0
21	MF	(Georgia (country)) GEO	Giorgi Kutsia	17	2	10+3	2	1	0	0+1	0	0+1	0	0+1	0
22	MF	(Georgia (country)) GEO	Irakli Bugridze	13	1	6+4	1	1	0	1	0	1	0	0	0
23	DF	(Georgia (country)) GEO	Irakli Azarovi	6	0	1+4	0	0+1	0	0	0	0	0	0	0
24	DF	(Georgia (country)) GEO	Nodar Iashvili	19	1	12+3	1	0	0	0+1	0	1	0	2	0
27	MF	(Georgia (country)) GEO	Anzor Mekvabishvili	11	0	8+2	0	1	0	0	0	0	0	0	0
29	FW	(Georgia (country)) GEO	Tornike Akhvlediani	3	0	1+1	0	0	0	0+1	0	0	0	0	0
30	GK	(Georgia (country)) GEO	Roin Kvaskhvadze	22	0	18	0	0	0	1	0	1	0	2	0
31	DF	(Ukraine) UKR	Ivan Trubochkin	7	0	4+1	0	1	0	1	0	0	0	0	0
34	MF	(Georgia (country)) GEO	Luka Gagnidze	2	0	0+2	0	0	0	0	0	0	0	0	0
38	MF	(Russia) RUS	Nodar Kavtaradze	16	9	12+2	9	0	0	0	0	0	0	2	0
39	DF	(Georgia (country)) GEO	Saba Khvadagiani	1	0	0	0	1	0	0	0	0	0	0	0
Dinamo Tbilisi II Players:
Players away from Dinamo Tbilisi on loan:
12	MF	(Senegal) SEN	Arfang Daffé	2	0	0+2	0	0	0	0	0	0	0	0	0
Players who left Dinamo Tbilisi during the season:
3	DF	(Georgia (country)) GEO	Luka Lochoshvili	12	0	10	0	0	0	1	0	1	0	0	0
32	MF	(Georgia (country)) GEO	Nika Ninua	3	0	1+1	0	0	0	1	0	0	0	0	0

=== Goal scorers ===
Place	Position	Nation	Number	Name	Erovnuli Liga	Georgian Cup	Super Cup	UEFA Champions League	UEFA Europa League	Total
1	MF	(Russia)	38	Nodar Kavtaradze	8	0	0	0	0	8
2	FW	(Georgia (country))	9	Giorgi Gabedava	4	0	0	0	1	5
3	FW	(Georgia (country))	12	Davit Skhirtladze	3	0	0	0	0	3
3	FW	(Georgia (country))	20	Tornike Kapanadze	3	0	0	0	0	3
3	FW	(Brazil)	17	Pernambuco	2	0	0	0	1	3
6	DF	(Georgia (country))	5	Davit Kobouri	2	0	0	0	0	2
6	MF	(Georgia (country))	21	Giorgi Kutsia	2	0	0	0	0	2
8	DF	(Togo)	19	Simon Gbegnon	1	0	0	0	0	1
8	DF	(Georgia (country))	24	Nodar Iashvili	1	0	0	0	0	1
8	MF	(Georgia (country))	6	Bakar Kardava	1	0	0	0	0	1
8	MF	(Georgia (country))	7	Giorgi Zaria	1	0	0	0	0	1
8	MF	(Georgia (country))	8	Giorgi Kukhianidze	1	0	0	0	0	1
8	MF	(Georgia (country))	15	Giorgi Papava	1	0	0	0	0	1
8	MF	(Georgia (country))	22	Irakli Bugridze	1	0	0	0	0	1
8	MF	(Georgia (country))	32	Nika Ninua	1	0	0	0	0	1
8				Own goal	1	0	0	0	0	1
				TOTALS	33	0	0	0	2	35

=== Clean sheets ===
Place	Position	Nation	Number	Name	Erovnuli Liga	Georgian Cup	Super Cup	UEFA Champions League	UEFA Europa League	Total
1	GK	(Georgia (country))	30	Roin Kvaskhvadze	11	0	0	0	1	12
				TOTALS	11	0	0	0	1	12

=== Disciplinary record ===
Number	Nation	Position	Name	Erovnuli Liga		Georgian Cup		Super Cup		UEFA Champions League		UEFA Europa League		Total	
Number	Nation	Position	Name	Booked	Sent off (straight red)	Booked	Sent off (straight red)	Booked	Sent off (straight red)	Booked	Sent off (straight red)	Booked	Sent off (straight red)	Booked	Sent off (straight red)
2	(Netherlands)	DF	Rodney Klooster	2	0	1	0	0	0	0	0	0	0	3	0
3	(Spain)	DF	Víctor Mongil	3	1	0	0	0	0	0	0	0	0	3	1
5	(Georgia (country))	DF	Davit Kobouri	1	0	0	0	0	0	0	0	0	0	1	0
6	(Georgia (country))	MF	Bakar Kardava	3	1	0	0	0	0	0	0	0	0	3	1
7	(Georgia (country))	MF	Giorgi Zaria	0	0	0	0	0	0	0	0	1	0	1	0
8	(Georgia (country))	MF	Giorgi Kukhianidze	1	0	0	0	0	0	0	0	0	0	1	0
9	(Georgia (country))	FW	Giorgi Gabedava	1	0	0	0	0	0	0	0	0	0	1	0
11	(Georgia (country))	MF	Akaki Shulaia	1	0	0	0	0	0	1	0	0	0	2	0
13	(Georgia (country))	GK	Omar Migineishvili	0	0	1	0	0	0	0	0	0	0	1	0
15	(Georgia (country))	MF	Giorgi Papava	2	1	0	0	0	0	1	0	0	0	3	1
16	(Georgia (country))	DF	Giorgi Kimadze	2	1	0	0	0	0	0	0	1	0	3	1
18	(Slovakia)	FW	Filip Oršula	0	0	0	0	1	0	0	0	0	0	1	0
19	(Togo)	DF	Simon Gbegnon	0	0	0	0	0	0	0	0	1	0	1	0
20	(Georgia (country))	FW	Tornike Kapanadze	1	0	0	0	0	0	0	0	0	0	1	0
21	(Georgia (country))	MF	Giorgi Kutsia	3	0	1	0	1	0	0	0	0	0	5	0
22	(Georgia (country))	MF	Irakli Bugridze	2	0	0	0	0	0	0	0	0	0	2	0
23	(Georgia (country))	DF	Irakli Azarovi	1	0	0	0	0	0	0	0	0	0	1	0
27	(Georgia (country))	MF	Anzor Mekvabishvili	3	0	0	0	0	0	0	0	0	0	3	0
29	(Georgia (country))	FW	Tornike Akhvlediani	1	0	0	0	0	0	0	0	0	0	1	0
31	(Ukraine)	DF	Ivan Trubochkin	3	0	0	0	0	0	0	0	0	0	3	0
38	(Russia)	MF	Nodar Kavtaradze	4	0	0	0	0	0	0	0	1	0	5	0
39	(Georgia (country))	DF	Saba Khvadagiani	0	0	1	0	0	0	0	0	0	0	1	0
Players away on loan:
Players who left Dinamo Tbilisi during the season:
3	(Georgia (country))	DF	Luka Lochoshvili	2	0	0	0	0	0	1	0	0	0	3	0
			TOTALS	36	4	0	0	2	0	3	0	4	0	45	4
