= Oleh Ostapenko =

Oleh Ostapenko may refer to:

- Oleh Ostapenko (footballer, born 1977) (born 1977), Ukrainian retired footballer and current manager
- Oleh Ostapenko (footballer, born 1997) (born 1997), Ukrainian footballer
