= Ostapenko =

Ostapenko (Ukrainian: Остапенко) is a Ukrainian surname that is derived from the name Ostap.

The surname may refer to:

- Aleksey Ostapenko (born 1986), Russian volleyball player
- Dmytro Ostapenko (born 1946), Ukrainian statesman
- Jeļena Ostapenko (born 1997), Latvian tennis player
- Oleg Ostapenko (born 1957), Russian colonel general
- Oleh Ostapenko Jr. (born 1997), Ukrainian footballer
- Oleh Ostapenko Sr. (born 1977), Ukrainian footballer and manager
- Sergei Ostapenko (born 1986), Kazakhstani footballer
- Serhiy Ostapenko (1881–1937), Ukrainian economist and statesman
