= Grigalashvili =

Grigalashvili (Georgian: გრიგალაშვილი) is a Georgian surname. Notable people with the surname include:

- Elgujja Grigalashvili (born 1989), Georgian footballer
- Shota Grigalashvili (born 1986), Georgian footballer
- Tato Grigalashvili (born 1999), Georgian judoka
- Tornike Grigalashvili (born 1993), Georgian football player
