= Mykola Musolitin =

Ukrainian footballer

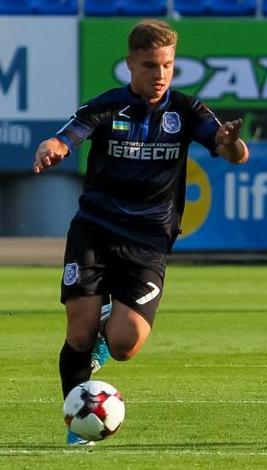

Personal information
- Full name: Mykola Volodymyrovych Musolitin
- Date of birth: 21 January 1999 (age 27)
- Place of birth: Odesa, Ukraine
- Height: 1.75 m (5 ft 9 in)
- Positions: Right-back; winger

Team information
- Current team: TransINVEST
- Number: 32

Youth career
- 2012–2015: Chornomorets Odesa

Senior career*
Years	Team	Apps	(Gls)
2015–2019	Chornomorets Odesa	70	(4)
2019	Chornomorets-2 Odesa	1	(0)
2020	Valmiera	17	(0)
2021	Lechia Gdańsk	7	(0)
2021	Lechia Gdańsk II	7	(1)
2022–2023	1. CfR Pforzheim	4	(1)
2023–2024	Östersunds FK	54	(3)
2025	Kotwica Kołobrzeg	11	(1)
2026–	TransINVEST	30	(3)

International career
2014–2015	Ukraine U16	7	(1)
2015–2016	Ukraine U17	5	(0)
2016–2017	Ukraine U18	3	(0)
2017–2018	Ukraine U19	7	(0)
2019	Ukraine U20	3	(0)
Medal record
Men's football
Representing Ukraine
UEFA European Under-19 Championship
Bronze medal – third place	2018 Finland
FIFA U-20 World Cup
Winner	2019 Poland
- * Club domestic league appearances and goals as of 19 October 2026 (UTC)

Mykola Volodymyrovych Musolitin (Ukrainian: Микола Володимирович Мусолітін; born 21 January 1999) is a Ukrainian professional footballer who plays as a right-back or winger for TOPLYGA club TransINVEST.

== Club career ==
Musolitin is a product of youth team system of FC Chornomorets. Made his debut for FC Chornomorets in the game against FC Stal Kamianske on 1 October 2016 in the Ukrainian Premier League.

=== TransINVEST ===
In January 2026, Musolitin signed with Lithuanian club TransINVEST.

== Personal life ==
Mykola is the son of Ukrainian former international footballer Volodymyr Musolitin. His paternal grandfather, also called Mykola, was also a professional footballer.

== International career ==
Musolitin was part of the Ukraine U20 team that won the 2019 FIFA U-20 World Cup.

== Career statistics ==
As of match played 25 May 2025

Appearances and goals by club, season and competition
Club	Season	League			National cup (Note: Includes Ukrainian Cup, Polish Cup, Svenska Cupen)		Europe		Other		Total	
Club	Season	Division	Apps	Goals	Apps	Goals	Apps	Goals	Apps	Goals	Apps	Goals
Chornomorets Odesa	2015–16	Ukrainian Premier League	0	0	0	0	—		—		0	0
Chornomorets Odesa	2016–17	Ukrainian Premier League	12	0	1	0	—		—		13	0
Chornomorets Odesa	2017–18	Ukrainian Premier League	18	0	1	0	—		—		19	0
Chornomorets Odesa	2018–19	Ukrainian Premier League	24	2	2	0	—		—		26	2
Chornomorets Odesa	2019–20	Ukrainian First League	16	2	0	0	—		—		16	2
Chornomorets Odesa	Total		70	4	4	0	—		—		74	4
Chornomorets-2 Odesa	2019–20	Ukrainian Second League	1	0	—		—		—		1	0
Valmiera	2020	Latvian Higher League	17	0	0	0	1 (Note: Appearance in UEFA Europa League)	0	—		18	0
Lechia Gdańsk	2020–21	Ekstraklasa	3	0	0	0	—		—		3	0
Lechia Gdańsk	2021–22	Ekstraklasa	4	0	1	0	—		—		5	0
Lechia Gdańsk	Total		7	0	1	0	—		—		8	0
Lechia Gdańsk II	2020–21	IV liga Pomerania	2	1	—		—		—		2	1
Lechia Gdańsk II	2021–22	IV liga Pomerania	5	0	—		—		—		5	0
Lechia Gdańsk II	Total		7	1	—		—		—		7	1
1. CfR Pforzheim	2022–23	Oberliga Baden-Württemberg	4	1	—		—		—		4	1
Östersunds FK	2022	Superettan	—		1	1	—		—		1	1
Östersunds FK	2023	Superettan	24	1	4	0	—		—		28	1
Östersunds FK	2024	Superettan	30	2	1	0	—		1 (Note: Appearance in Superettan relegation play-offs)	0	32	2
Östersunds FK	Total		54	3	6	1	—		1	0	61	4
Kotwica Kołobrzeg	2024–25	I liga	11	1	—		—		—		11	1
Career total			171	10	11	1	1	0	1	0	184	11

== Honours ==
Ukraine U20

- FIFA U-20 World Cup: 2019
