= Filip Oršula =

Slovak footballer

Personal information
- Full name: Filip Oršula
- Date of birth: 25 February 1993 (age 33)
- Place of birth: Sebedražie, Slovakia
- Height: 1.80 m (5 ft 11 in)
- Positions: Winger; second striker

Team information
- Current team: FC Petržalka
- Number: 25

Youth career
- Prievidza
- Spartak Trnava
- 2008–2010: Manchester City
- 2010–2012: Twente

Senior career*
Years	Team	Apps	(Gls)
2012–2013	Wigan Athletic	0	(0)
2013	Duisburg	12	(0)
2014	Spartak Myjava	30	(3)
2015–2018	Slovan Bratislava	75	(7)
2018–2019	Slovan Liberec	20	(2)
2019	Spartak Trnava	13	(1)
2020–2021	Dinamo Tbilisi	7	(0)
2021–2022	Senica	20	(0)
2022–	FC Petržalka	60	(3)

International career
2011	Slovakia U19	3	(1)
2012–2014	Slovakia U21	6	(2)
2017	Slovakia	2	(0)
- * Club domestic league appearances and goals as of 2 January 2025

Filip Oršula (born 25 February 1993) is a Slovak footballer who plays as a winger or second striker for FC Petržalka.

== Club career ==
The pre-season friendly with Wigan Athletic match began well for Oršula, as he made a goal-scoring debut, against Stockport County. He debuted for the first team on 25 September 2012, in the League Cup match against West Ham United.

He was on trial at NEC Nijmegen in July 2013 and played in a friendly match against Quick 1888 (0–5).

=== MSV Duisburg ===
On 24 July 2013, he joined MSV Duisburg on a two-year contract.

=== Dinamo Tbilisi ===
After spending half of season with Spartak Trnava, Oršula had signed a two-year contract with reigning Georgian champions Dinamo Tbilisi, in January 2020. He had joined the squad earlier during a winter training camp in Turkey.

=== Slovan Bratislava ===
Oršula officially moved from FC Petržalka to Slovan Bratislava B on January 3, 2025 on a free transfer.

== International career ==
Oršula was first called up to the senior national team for two unofficial friendly fixtures held in Abu Dhabi, UAE, in January 2017, against Uganda and Sweden. He made his debut against Uganda, being fielded from the start until the 85th minute, when he was substituted for Pavol Šafranko. Slovakia went on to lose the game 1–3. He also played the last thirty minutes of a match against Sweden, which Slovakia lost 0–6, when he replaced Dávid Guba.
