= Robert Mutzers =

Dutch footballer (born 1993)

Personal information
- Date of birth: 6 April 1993 (age 33)
- Place of birth: Oosterhout, Netherlands
- Height: 1.74 m (5 ft 8 1/2 in)
- Position: Winger

Team information
- Current team: GVV Unitas
- Number: 9

Youth career
- –2012: VV Dongen

Senior career*
Years	Team	Apps	(Gls)
2012–2015	VV Dongen		
2015–2017	De Treffers	64	(27)
2017–2018	FC Dordrecht	35	(12)
2018	Chornomorets Odesa	5	(0)
2019	Kozakken Boys	17	(1)
2019–2020	Helmond Sport	16	(2)
2020–2021	Esperanza Pelt		
2021–	GVV Unitas	1	(0)
- * Club domestic league appearances and goals as of 29 August 2021

Robert Mutzers (born 6 April 1993) is a Dutch football player who plays for GVV Unitas.

== Club career ==
He made his Eerste Divisie debut for FC Dordrecht on 18 August 2017 in a game against Fortuna Sittard.

On 14 March 2021, he agreed to join GVV Unitas.
