= Rodney Klooster =

Dutch footballer

Personal information
- Full name: Rodney Rudy Ferdinand Klooster
- Date of birth: 26 November 1996 (age 29)
- Place of birth: Vlaardingen, Netherlands
- Height: 1.88 m (6 ft 2 in)
- Position: Right back

Youth career
- Excelsior
- Dordrecht

Senior career*
Years	Team	Apps	(Gls)
2016	Dordrecht	4	(0)
2017–2018	AS Trenčín	9	(0)
2018	→ FC Eindhoven (loan)	12	(0)
2018–2019	FC Eindhoven	15	(0)
2019	Botev Plovdiv	5	(0)
2020	Inter Turku	0	(0)
2020	Dinamo Tbilisi	3	(0)
2021–2023	TEC	41	(1)
- * Club domestic league appearances and goals

Rodney Klooster (born 26 November 1996) is a Dutch former professional footballer who played as a right back. Besides the Netherlands, he has played in Slovakia, Bulgaria, Finland, and Georgia.

== Career ==
Rodney Klooster has a twin brother named Milton. He is also a footballer, currently playing for Excelsior Maassluis as a forward.

Klooster made his Fortuna Liga debut for AS Trenčín against Zemplín Michalovce on 12 March 2017.
