= Irakli Meskhia =

Ukrainian footballer

Personal information
- Full name: Irakli Heorhiyevych Meskhia
- Date of birth: 7 January 1993 (age 33)
- Place of birth: Gali, Georgia
- Height: 1.83 m (6 ft 0 in)
- Position: Midfielder

Team information
- Current team: Łysica Bodzentyn
- Number: 14

Youth career
- 2009: Obolon Kyiv

Senior career*
Years	Team	Apps	(Gls)
2009–2013	Obolon Kyiv	12	(1)
2012	→ FC Obolon-2 Kyiv (loan)	10	(0)
2013	Metalist Kharkiv	0	(0)
2013	Zestaponi	8	(0)
2014	Karkonosze Jelenia Góra	2	(1)
2014–2016	Stomil Olsztyn	23	(4)
2016–2017	Chojniczanka Chojnice	12	(1)
2017–2018	Wisła Puławy	13	(1)
2018	Motor Lublin	10	(1)
2022	Sokil Kinchesh	1	(0)
2023	Łysica Bodzentyn	10	(3)
2024	Spartakus Daleszyce	12	(2)
2024–	Łysica Bodzentyn	4	(0)

International career
2012	Ukraine U19	4	(0)
2013	Ukraine U21	5	(1)
- * Club domestic league appearances and goals as of 10:49, 21 June 2025 (UTC)

Irakli Heorhiyevych Meskhia (Ukrainian: Іраклі Георгієвич Месхія; Georgian: ირაკლი მესხია; born 7 January 1993) is a professional footballer who plays as a midfielder for Polish club Łysica Bodzentyn. Born in Georgia, he has represented Ukraine at youth level.

Meskhia is a product of youth team systems of Obolon Kyiv.

Made his debut for Obolon entering as a substituted player in game against Metalurh Donetsk on 24 March 2012 in Ukrainian Premier League.

In January 2013 he signed half-year on loan deal with the Ukrainian Premier League club FC Hoverla, but not played for this team.

On 17 July 2018, he signed a contract with Motor Lublin. On 20 December 2018, his contract was terminated by mutual agreement.

== Honours ==
Łysica Bodzentyn

- Regional league Świętokrzyskie: 2022–23
