= Alyaksey Vasilewski =

Belarusian footballer

Personal information
- Date of birth: 2 June 1993 (age 33)
- Place of birth: Kopyl, Minsk Oblast, Belarus
- Position: Defender

Team information
- Current team: Soligorsk (manager)

Youth career
- 2007–2013: Shakhtyor Soligorsk

Senior career*
Years	Team	Apps	(Gls)
2014–2015	Shakhtyor Soligorsk	5	(0)
2016–2017	Krumkachy Minsk	39	(3)
2018	Baranovichi	3	(0)
2018	Krumkachy Minsk	2	(0)

International career^{‡}
2011	Belarus U19	2	(0)
2012–2014	Belarus U21	16	(1)

Managerial career
- 2025–: Soligorsk
- * Club domestic league appearances and goals as of 31 December 2018 ‡ National team caps and goals as of 5 November 2014

Alyaksey Vasilewski (Belarusian: Аляксей Васiлеўскi; Russian: Алексей Василевский; born 2 June 1993) is a Belarusian former professional footballer.
