= Dmytro Semeniv =

Ukrainian footballer

Personal information
- Full name: Dmytro Romanovych Semeniv
- Date of birth: 24 June 1998 (age 28)
- Place of birth: Khlibodarske, Ukraine
- Height: 1.82 m (6 ft 0 in)
- Position: Midfielder

Team information
- Current team: Dordoi Bishkek
- Number: 20

Youth career
- 2010–2012: Viktoriya Avanhard
- 2012–2015: Chornomorets Odesa

Senior career*
Years	Team	Apps	(Gls)
2015	Real Pharma Odesa	2	(0)
2016–2019	Chornomorets Odesa	23	(0)
2020	Liepāja	5	(0)
2020	Hirnyk-Sport Horishni Plavni	12	(2)
2021–2022	Lviv	27	(1)
2023–2024	Pirin Blagoevgrad	36	(1)
2024	Spartak Varna	12	(0)
2024–2025	Feronikeli	8	(0)
2025–2026	Olimpia Elbląg	31	(2)
2026–	Dordoi Bishkek	1	(0)
- * Club domestic league appearances and goals as of 21:29, 11 March 2026 (UTC)

Dmytro Romanovych Semeniv (Ukrainian: Дмитро Романович Семенів; born 24 June 1998) is a Ukrainian professional footballer who plays as a midfielder for Kyrgyz club Dordoi Bishkek.

== Career ==
Born in Odesa Oblast, Semeniv is a product of the FC Viktoriya from the settlement of Avanhard in the Odesa Oblast and FC Chornomorets youth system.

He first played for Real Pharma Odesa in the Ukrainian Second League, but in February 2016 he signed a contract with Chornomorets Odesa and played in the Ukrainian Premier League Reserves. Two years later, in February 2018 was promoted to the senior squad.

In January 2023, Semeniv signed for First League club Pirin Blagoevgrad. A year later, he moved to Spartak Varna.

On 17 February 2025, after a half-year stint with Kosovar club Feronikeli, Semeniv joined Polish third-tier side Olimpia Elbląg for the rest of the season.
