= Denys Norenkov =

Ukrainian footballer

Personal information
- Full name: Denys Olehovych Norenkov
- Date of birth: 25 July 1996 (age 30)
- Place of birth: Odesa, Ukraine
- Height: 1.82 m (5 ft 11 1/2 in)
- Position: Midfielder

Team information
- Current team: Hibernians
- Number: 41

Youth career
- 2009–2011: Chornomorets Odesa
- 2011–2013: Dynamo Kyiv

Senior career*
Years	Team	Apps	(Gls)
2013–2015	Dynamo Kyiv	0	(0)
2015–2017	Chornomorets Odesa	2	(0)
2017	→ Helios Kharkiv (loan)	7	(1)
2017–2018	Zhemchuzhyna Odesa	21	(2)
2018–2020	Chornomorets Odesa	30	(2)
2020	Volyn Lutsk	7	(0)
2020–2021	Kremin Kremenchuk	7	(0)
2021–2022	LNZ Cherkasy	7	(1)
2022	ATSV Sattledt		
2022	Hogo Hertha	7	(0)
2023–2025	LNZ Cherkasy	29	(2)
2026–	Hibernians	9	(0)

International career
2012	Ukraine-16	3	(0)
- * Club domestic league appearances and goals as of 18 May 2026

Denys Norenkov (Ukrainian: Денис Олегович Норенков; born 25 July 1996) is a Ukrainian professional footballer who plays as a midfielder for Maltese Premier League club Hibernians.

== Career ==
Norenkov is product of youth systems of FC Chornomorets and FC Dynamo Kyiv.

In March 2017 went on loan for FC Helios Kharkiv in the Ukrainian First League.

=== LNZ Cherkasy and spells in Austria ===
In summer 2021 he moved to LNZ Cherkasy in Ukrainian Second League. On 11 September he scored his first goal against FC Chernihiv.

In April 2022, Norenkov joined Austrian club ATSV Sattledt, as he had left Ukraine due to the Russo-Ukrainian War. In July 2022, he moved to Hogo Hertha. In January 2023, Norenkov left Austria and returned to Ukraine, joining his former club, LNZ Cherkasy.
