= Oleksandr Kalitov =

Ukrainian footballer

Personal information
- Full name: Oleksandr Volodymyrovych Kalitov
- Date of birth: 29 September 1993 (age 33)
- Place of birth: Odesa, Ukraine
- Height: 1.82 m (6 ft 0 in)
- Positions: Defender; midfielder

Youth career
- 2006–2010: Chornomorets Odesa

Senior career*
Years	Team	Apps	(Gls)
2011	Real Pharm Yuzhne	5	(0)
2012–2013	Odesa	32	(1)
2013–2015	Metalurh Donetsk	0	(0)
2015–2017	Chornomorets Odesa	9	(0)
2017	Real Pharma Odesa	11	(2)
2018	Nyva Vinnytsia	9	(0)
2018–2019	Chornomorets Odesa	0	(0)
2019–2022	Nyva Vinnytsia	56	(2)
- * Club domestic league appearances and goals as of 16 July 2022

Oleksandr Volodymyrovych Kalitov (Ukrainian: Олександр Володимирович Калітов; born 29 September 1993) is a Ukrainian professional football defender and midfielder.

== Career ==
Kalitov is a product of Chornomorets Odesa academy. He made his debut for Chornomorets Odeas in the Ukrainian Premier League game against Volyn Lutsk on 8 March 2015.
