= Avazbek Otkeev =

Kyrgyzstani national footballer

Personal information
- Date of birth: 4 December 1993 (age 32)
- Place of birth: Kyrgyzstan
- Position: Midfielder

Team information
- Current team: FC Alga Bishkek
- Number: 29

Senior career*
Years	Team	Apps	(Gls)
2012-2022	Dordoi Bishkek	49	(3)
2022-2023	FC Alay Osh	18	(1)
2023-	FC Alga Bishkek	20	(1)

International career^{‡}
2017–	Kyrgyzstan	5	(0)
- * Club domestic league appearances and goals as of 30 August 2024 @ 12:00PM(AEST) ‡ National team caps and goals as of 15 October 2019

Avazbek Otkeev (born 4 December 1993) is a Kyrgyzstani footballer who plays for Dordoi Bishkek in the Kyrgyzstan League and Kyrgyzstan national football team as a midfielder.

== Career statistics ==
=== International ===
Statistics accurate as of match played 21 January 2019

Kyrgyzstan national team
Year	Apps	Goals
2017	1	0
2018	4	0
Total	5	0

Statistics accurate as of match played 16 October 2018
