= Artem Yarmolenko =

Ukrainian footballer

Personal information
- Full name: Artem Olehovych Yarmolenko
- Date of birth: 18 January 1998 (age 28)
- Place of birth: Kyiv, Ukraine
- Height: 1.83 m (6 ft 0 in)
- Position: Defender

Youth career
- –2015: Dynamo Kyiv

Senior career*
Years	Team	Apps	(Gls)
2015	Dynamo Kyiv	0	(0)
2016–2017	União de Leiria	2	(0)
2018–2020	Chornomorets Odesa	2	(0)
2020–2021	Ahrobiznes Volochysk	4	(0)

International career
2015–2016	Ukraine U18	5	(1)
2016	Ukraine U19	2	(0)
- * Club domestic league appearances and goals as of 26 June 2021

Artem Olehovych Yarmolenko (Ukrainian: Артем Олегович Ярмоленко; born 18 January 1998) is a Ukrainian football player.

== Club career ==
He made his Ukrainian Premier League debut for FC Chornomorets Odesa on 23 July 2018 in a game against FC Olimpik Donetsk.

In November 2018, it was announced that he tested positive for ostarine in August 2018 and was suspended from playing.
