= Davit Iashvili =

Georgian-born Ukrainian footballer

Personal information
- Full name: Davit Mykhaylovych Iashvili
- Date of birth: 1 September 1992 (age 34)
- Place of birth: Tbilisi, Georgia
- Height: 1.82 m (5 ft 11 1/2 in)
- Position: Defender

Youth career
- 2009: RVUFK Kyiv

Senior career*
Years	Team	Apps	(Gls)
2011–2012	FC Obolon Kyiv	3	(0)
2012	→ FC Obolon-2 Kyiv	16	(2)
2012–2013	FC Dynamo Kyiv	0	(0)
2013–2014	FC Obolon-Brovar Kyiv	18	(0)
2015	FC Nyva Ternopil	2	(0)

International career
2012	Ukraine-20	3	(0)
2012–2013	Ukraine-21	5	(0)
- * Club domestic league appearances and goals

Davit Iashvili (Ukrainian: Давіт Михайлович Іашвілі; Georgian: დავით იაშვილი; born 1 September 1992) is a Georgian-born Ukrainian former professional football defender.

Iashvili is a product of the youth team systems of RVUFK Kyiv. But he then signed a contract with FC Obolon in 2011. On 3 December 2012, he signed a 3.5-year deal with FC Dynamo Kyiv until 30 June 2016.

He was called up to play for the Ukraine national under-21 football team by trainer Pavlo Yakovenko in a friendly match against Denmark and Portugal in October 2012.
