= Volodymyr Koval =

Ukrainian footballer (born 1992)

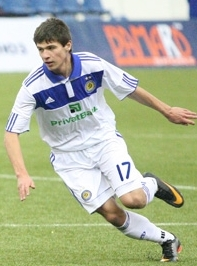

Personal information
- Full name: Volodymyr Viktorovych Koval
- Date of birth: 6 March 1992 (age 34)
- Place of birth: Kyiv, Ukraine
- Height: 1.76 m (5 ft 9 1/2 in)
- Position: Forward

Team information
- Current team: Lisne
- Number: 8

Youth career
- 2005–2009: Dynamo Kyiv

Senior career*
Years	Team	Apps	(Gls)
2009–2012	Dynamo-2 Kyiv	80	(16)
2012–2014	Sevastopol	27	(0)
2013	→ Sevastopol-2	1	(0)
2014–2015	Stomil Olsztyn	25	(12)
2015–2017	Termalica Bruk-Bet Nieciecza	16	(0)
2017–2018	Olimpia Grudziądz	24	(3)
2018–2019	Chornomorets Odesa	29	(2)
2020	Neman Grodno	11	(0)
2021	Livyi Bereh Kyiv	16	(5)
2023	Kudrivka	12	(6)
2024–	Lisne	0	(0)

International career
2008	Ukraine U16	7	(0)
2008–2009	Ukraine U17	13	(0)
2009–2010	Ukraine U18	11	(3)
2010–2011	Ukraine U19	17	(1)
2012	Ukraine U20	4	(0)
2012–2013	Ukraine U21	5	(2)
- * Club domestic league appearances and goals as of 6 March 2024

Volodymyr Koval (Ukrainian: Володимир Вікторович Коваль; born 6 March 1992) is a Ukrainian professional footballer who plays as a forward for Lisne.

== International career ==
He was called up by manager Serhiy Kovalets for the squad of the Ukraine national under-21 football team to participate in the 2013 Commonwealth of Independent States Cup in Russia.
