= Stanislav Sazonovich =

Belarusian footballer

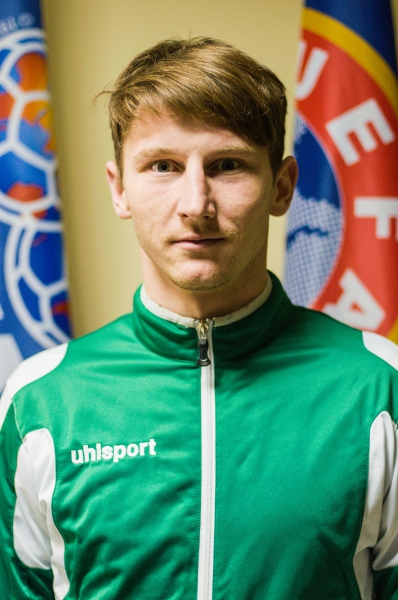

Personal information
- Date of birth: 6 March 1992 (age 34)
- Place of birth: Stary Ostrov, Mogilev Oblast, Belarus
- Height: 1.83 m (6 ft 0 in)
- Position: Defender

Youth career
- Zvezda-BGU Minsk

Senior career*
Years	Team	Apps	(Gls)
2009–2010	Zvezda-BGU Minsk	31	(0)
2010–2017	Gomel	114	(2)
2012	→ Vedrich-97 Rechitsa (loan)	25	(1)
2014	→ Naftan Novopolotsk (loan)	5	(0)
2018	Smolevichi	19	(1)
2019–2020	Gorodeya	38	(1)
2020	Belshina Bobruisk	6	(1)
2021–2022	Arsenal Dzerzhinsk	57	(6)

International career^{‡}
2012–2013	Belarus U21	12	(1)
2017	Belarus B	1	(0)
- * Club domestic league appearances and goals as of 31 December 2022 ‡ National team caps and goals as of 14 July 2017

Stanislav Sazonovich (Belarusian: Станiслаў Сазановiч; Russian: Станислав Сазонович; born 6 March 1992) is a Belarusian professional footballer.
