= Tornike Grigalashvili =

Georgian footballer

Personal information
- Date of birth: 28 January 1993 (age 33)
- Place of birth: Kutaisi, Georgia
- Height: 1.73 m (5 ft 8 in)
- Position: Right back

Youth career
- 2009–2011: Zestaponi

Senior career*
Years	Team	Apps	(Gls)
2011–2014	Zestaponi	55	(1)
2015	Chikhura Sachkhere	11	(0)
2016	Schwarz-Weiß Rehden	8	(0)
2016–2017	Chikhura Sachkhere	34	(1)
2018	Torpedo Kutaisi	8	(0)
2018–2019	Dila Gori	30	(0)
2019–2021	Torpedo Kutaisi	18	(0)
2021–2022	Zestaponi		
2022–2023	Guria Lanchkhuti		

International career^{‡}
2011	Georgia U19	3	(0)
2017–	Georgia	1	(0)
- * Club domestic league appearances and goals as of 2 December 20202 ‡ National team caps and goals as of 14 March 2017

Tornike Grigalashvili (Georgian: თორნიკე გრიგალაშვილი; born 28 January 1993) is a Georgian football player.

== Club career ==
Grigalashvili began his career in Zestaponi. He spent a single season in Germany as well, playing for Schwarz-Weiß Rehden.

== International ==
Grigalashvili made his debut for the Georgia national football team on 25 January 2017 in a friendly against Jordan.
