= Ivan Trubochkin =

Ukrainian footballer

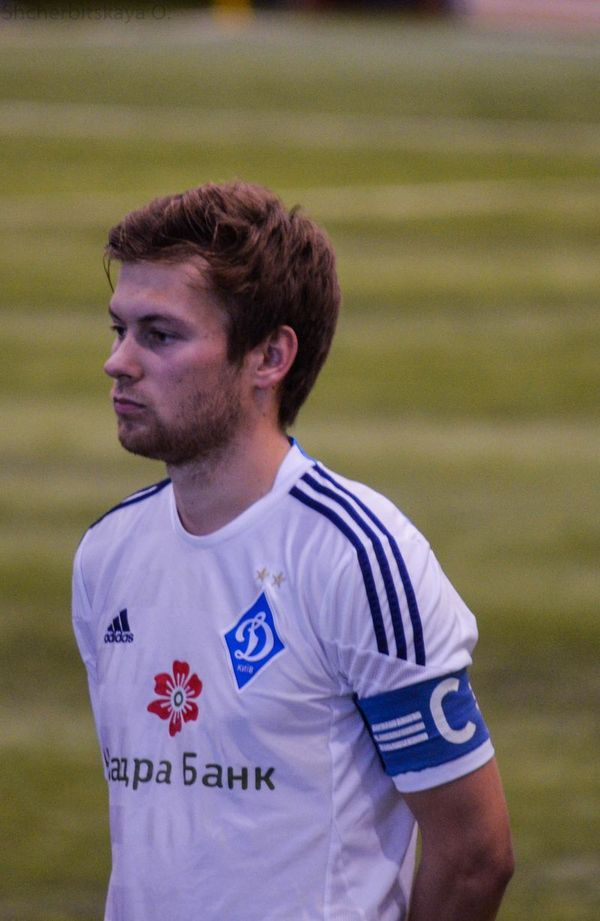

Personal information
- Full name: Ivan Valeriyovych Trubochkin
- Date of birth: 17 March 1993 (age 33)
- Place of birth: Kyiv, Ukraine
- Height: 1.81 m (5 ft 11 in)
- Position: Right-back

Youth career
- 2001–2003: Obolon-Zmina Kyiv
- 2003–2010: Dynamo Kyiv

Senior career*
Years	Team	Apps	(Gls)
2010–2016	Dynamo Kyiv	0	(0)
2013–2016	→ Dynamo-2 Kyiv	68	(1)
2016	Umeå	9	(1)
2017	Krumkachy Minsk	10	(0)
2017–2018	Arsenal Kyiv	18	(1)
2018–2019	Chornomorets Odesa	25	(0)
2019	Olimpik Donetsk	3	(0)
2020	Dinamo Tbilisi	5	(0)
2021	Dinaz Vyshhorod	4	(0)
2021	Olimpik Donetsk	7	(0)
2022–2023	Mynai	19	(1)

International career^{‡}
2008	Ukraine U16	1	(0)
2010	Ukraine U18	1	(0)
2011–2012	Ukraine U19	16	(1)
2012	Ukraine U20	3	(0)
2012–2013	Ukraine U21	7	(0)
- * Club domestic league appearances and goals as of 4 June 2023 ‡ National team caps and goals as of 26 September 2021

Ivan Valeriyovych Trubochkin (Ukrainian: Іван Валерійович Трубочкін; born 17 March 1993) is a Ukrainian former professional footballer who played as a right-back.

== Career ==
Trubochkin is a product of the Dynamo Kyiv academy and signed a three-and-a-half-year contract with the Ukrainian Premier League club in December 2012.
