= Ruslan Babenko =

Ukrainian footballer (born 1992)

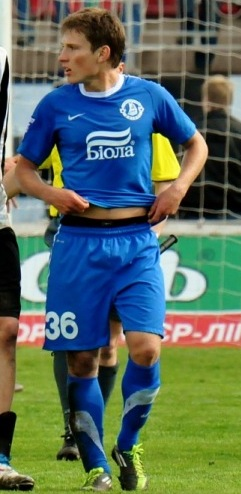

Personal information
- Full name: Ruslan Oleksandrovych Babenko
- Date of birth: 8 July 1992 (age 34)
- Place of birth: Dnipropetrovsk, Ukraine
- Height: 1.72 m (5 ft 8 in)
- Position: Central midfielder

Team information
- Current team: Polissya Zhytomyr
- Number: 8

Youth career
- 2005–2007: UFK Dnipropetrovsk
- 2007: SDYuShOR Mykolaiv
- 2007–2009: Dnipro Dnipropetrovsk

Senior career*
| Years | Team | Apps | (Gls) |
| 2009–2015 | Dnipro Dnipropetrovsk | 11 | (0) |
| 2014–2015 | → Volyn Lutsk (loan) | 17 | (1) |
| 2015 | Stal Dniprodzerzhynsk | 9 | (1) |
| 2016 | Bodø/Glimt | 19 | (0) |
| 2017–2018 | Zorya Luhansk | 19 | (0) |
| 2018–2019 | Chornomorets Odesa | 28 | (2) |
| 2019–2020 | Raków Częstochowa | 22 | (0) |
| 2020–2021 | Olimpik Donetsk | 22 | (1) |
| 2021–2022 | Polissya Zhytomyr | 10 | (0) |
| 2022 | Metalist Kharkiv | 0 | (0) |
| 2022–2024 | Dnipro-1 | 49 | (1) |
| 2024– | Polissya Zhytomyr | 50 | (0) |

International career
| 2008–2009 | Ukraine U16 | 5 | (0) |
| 2008–2009 | Ukraine U17 | 12 | (1) |
| 2009–2010 | Ukraine U18 | 17 | (3) |
| 2010–2011 | Ukraine U19 | 11 | (0) |
| 2012 | Ukraine U20 | 4 | (1) |
| 2011–2014 | Ukraine U21 | 30 | (3) |
- * Club domestic league appearances and goals as of 13:43, 25 May 2026 (UTC)

Ruslan Oleksandrovych Babenko (Ukrainian: Руслан Олександрович Бабенко; born 8 July 1992) is a Ukrainian professional footballer who plays as a central midfielder for Ukrainian Premier League club Polissya Zhytomyr.

== Career ==
Babenko is a product of the Dnipro Dnipropetrovsk academy. He made his first team debut in the Ukrainian Premier League in a match against Kryvbas Kryvyi Rih on 23 April 2011.

On 19 February 2016, Babenko signed a two-year deal for Tippeligaen club Bodø/Glimt as a free transfer. After just one season in Bodø/Glimt, he left the club after they were relegated.

== Career statistics ==
As of 14 November 2016

Appearances and goals by club, season and competition
| Club | Season | League | | | National cup (Note: Includes Ukrainian Cup, Norwegian Cup) | | Total | |
| Club | Season | Division | Apps | Goals | Apps | Goals | Apps | Goals |
|---|---|---|---|---|---|---|---|---|
| Dnipro Dnipropetrovsk | 2010–11 | Ukrainian Premier League | 4 | 0 | 0 | 0 | 4 | 0 |
| Dnipro Dnipropetrovsk | 2011–12 | Ukrainian Premier League | 5 | 0 | 0 | 0 | 5 | 0 |
| Dnipro Dnipropetrovsk | 2012–13 | Ukrainian Premier League | 2 | 0 | 0 | 0 | 2 | 0 |
| Dnipro Dnipropetrovsk | 2013–14 | Ukrainian Premier League | 0 | 0 | 0 | 0 | 0 | 0 |
| Dnipro Dnipropetrovsk | Total | | 11 | 0 | 0 | 0 | 11 | 0 |
| Volyn Lutsk (loan) | 2014–15 | Ukrainian Premier League | 17 | 1 | 2 | 0 | 19 | 1 |
| Stal Dniprodzerzhynsk | 2015–16 | Ukrainian Premier League | 9 | 1 | 2 | 0 | 11 | 1 |
| Bodø/Glimt | 2016 | Tippeligaen | 19 | 0 | 4 | 0 | 23 | 0 |
| Career total | | | 56 | 2 | 8 | 0 | 64 | 2 |
