= Oleh Ostapenko (footballer, born 1977) =

Ukrainian footballer (born 1977)

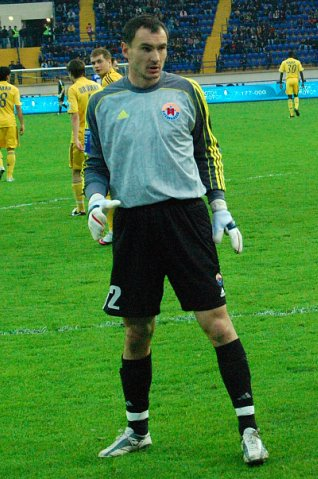

Personal information
- Full name: Oleh Volodymyrovych Ostapenko
- Date of birth: 27 October 1977 (age 49)
- Place of birth: Vinnytsia, Ukrainian SSR
- Height: 1.91 m (6 ft 3 in)
- Position: Goalkeeper

Team information
- Current team: Nyva Vinnytsia (GK coach)

Youth career
- DVUFK Dnipropetrovsk

Senior career*
Years	Team	Apps	(Gls)
1995	Podillya Khmelnytskyi	2	(0)
1996	Ros Bila Tserkva	11	(0)
1996	Bershad	1	(0)
1997–2000	Nyva Vinnytsia	84	(0)
2000	Kryvbas Kryvyi Rih	12	(0)
2001	Fakel Voronezh	1	(0)
2001–2003	Kryvbas Kryvyi Rih	47	(0)
2004–2006	Metalist Kharkiv	29	(0)
2006	Inter Baku	1	(0)
2007	Kryvbas Kryvyi Rih	4	(0)
2008	Vorskla Poltava	2	(0)
2009	Banants Yerevan	12	(0)
2009–2010	Illichivets Mariupol	2	(0)
2010–2011	Obolon Kyiv	5	(0)
2011–2012	Nyva Vinnytsia	4	(0)
2012–2013	Vinnytsia	1	(0)
Total		218	(0)

Managerial career
- 2011: Nyva Vinnytsia (caretaker)
- 2012: Nyva Vinnytsia (director)
- 2012: Nyva Vinnytsia (caretaker)
- 2012–2013: Vinnytsia (director of sports)
- 2013–2019: Vorskla Poltava (GK coach)
- 2020: Nyva Vinnytsia (GK coach)
- 2020–2021: Volyn Lutsk (GK coach)
- 2021–2022: Nyva Vinnytsia (GK coach)
- 2022–2023: Nyva Vinnytsia
- 2023–: Nyva Vinnytsia (GK coach)
Medal record
Men's football
Representing Ukraine
UEFA European Under-16 Championship
Third place	1994 Republic of Ireland
- * Club domestic league appearances and goals

Oleh Volodymyrovych Ostapenko (Ukrainian: Олег Володимирович Остапенко; born 27 October 1977) is a Ukrainian football coach and a former goalkeeper.

== Career ==
Ostapenko worked as goalkeeping coach at Volyn Lutsk.

== Personal life ==
Ostapenko was born in Vinnytsia, Ukrainian SSR. He is the father of the current Ukrainian defender Oleh Ostapenko.
