= Oleh Ostapenko (footballer, born 1997) =

Ukrainian footballer

Personal information
- Full name: Oleh Olehovych Ostapenko
- Date of birth: 11 June 1997 (age 29)
- Place of birth: Vinnytsia, Ukraine
- Height: 1.93 m (6 ft 4 in)
- Position: Defender

Team information
- Current team: Metalurh Zaporizhzhia
- Number: 2

Youth career
- 2010–2014: Nyva Vinnytsia

Senior career*
Years	Team	Apps	(Gls)
2014–2018	Vorskla Poltava	2	(0)
2018–2019	Chornomorets Odesa	13	(0)
2020	Nyva Vinnytsia	0	(0)
2020	Chornomorets Odesa	11	(0)
2020–	Metalurh Zaporizhzhia	0	(0)
- * Club domestic league appearances and goals as of 5 October 2020

Oleh Olehovych Ostapenko (Ukrainian: Олег Олегович Остапенко; born 11 June 1997) is a Ukrainian football defender who plays for Metalurh Zaporizhzhia.

== Career ==
Ostapenko is a product of his native FC Nyva Vinnytsia.

In 2014 he signed contract with FC Vorskla and continued his career as player in the Ukrainian Premier League Reserves. And in March 2017 Ostapenko was promoted to the main-squad team of FC Vorskla in the Ukrainian Premier League. He made his debut as a substituted player for Vorskla Poltava in the Ukrainian Premier League in a match against FC Karpaty Lviv on 15 April 2017.

== Personal life ==
Ostapenko is a son of the retired Ukrainian goalkeeper and current manager Oleh Ostapenko.
