= 2018–19 FC Vorskla Poltava season =

Vorskla Poltava
2018-19 season
- Chairman: Roman Cherniak
- Manager: Vasyl Sachko (until 27 March 2019); Vitaliy Kosovskyi (interim) (since 28 March 2019)
- Stadium: Oleksiy Butovskyi Vorskla Stadium
- Ukrainian Premier League: 7th
- Ukrainian Cup: Quarter-finals
- UEFA Europa League: Group stage
- Top goalscorer: League: Sharpar (6); All: Sharpar (7)
- Highest home attendance: 10,082 vs Sporting
- Lowest home attendance: 951 vs Oleksandriya
Home colours	Away colours

The 2018–19 season was 23rd consecutive season in the top Ukrainian football league for Vorskla Poltava. Vorskla competed in Premier League, Ukrainian Cup and UEFA Europa League.

== Players ==
=== Squad information ===
As of 31 May 2019

Squad no.	Name	Nationality	Position	Date of birth (age)
Goalkeepers
1	Bohdan Shust	(Ukraine)	GK	4 March 1986 (aged 33)
21	Oleksandr Tkachenko	(Ukraine)	GK	19 February 1993 (aged 26)
31	Dmytro Riznyk ^{List B}	(Ukraine)	GK	30 January 1999 (aged 20)
Defenders
3	Andro Giorgadze ^{List B}	(Georgia (country))	DF	3 May 1996 (aged 23)
5	Najeeb Yakubu ^{List B}	(Ghana)	DF	1 May 2000 (aged 19)
17	Volodymyr Chesnakov (Captain)	(Ukraine)	DF	12 February 1988 (aged 31)
23	Vadym Sapay	(Ukraine)	DF	7 February 1986 (aged 33)
25	Yevhen Martynenko	(Ukraine)	DF	25 June 1993 (aged 25)
33	Oleksandr Chyzhov	(Ukraine)	DF	10 August 1986 (aged 32)
40	Taras Sakiv ^{List B}	(Ukraine)	DF	19 November 1997 (aged 21)
44	Ardin Dallku	(Kosovo) (Albania)	DF	1 November 1994 (aged 24)
48	Denys Taraduda ^{List B}	(Ukraine)	DF	17 August 2000 (aged 18)
50	Ibrahim Kane ^{List B}	(Mali)	DF	23 June 2000 (aged 18)
55	Ihor Honchar	(Ukraine)	DF	10 January 1993 (aged 26)
Midfielders
4	Ihor Perduta	(Ukraine)	MF	15 November 1990 (aged 28)
6	Oleksandr Sklyar	(Ukraine)	MF	26 February 1991 (aged 28)
8	Artem Habelok	(Ukraine)	MF	1 February 1995 (aged 24)
9	Edin Šehić	(Bosnia and Herzegovina) (Croatia)	MF	3 February 1995 (aged 24)
11	Vyacheslav Sharpar	(Ukraine)	MF	2 June 1987 (aged 31)
13	Maryan Mysyk	(Ukraine)	MF	2 October 1996 (aged 22)
19	Volodymyr Odaryuk	(Ukraine)	MF	13 February 1994 (aged 25)
29	Dmytro Kravchenko	(Ukraine)	MF	25 February 1995 (aged 24)
30	Aleksandre Kobakhidze	(Georgia (country))	MF	11 February 1987 (aged 32)
66	Artur	(Brazil)	MF	5 August 1994 (aged 24)
82	Pavlo Rebenok	(Ukraine)	MF	23 July 1985 (aged 33)
94	Todor Petrović	(Serbia) (Bosnia and Herzegovina)	MF	18 August 1994 (aged 24)
Forwards
14	Nicolas Careca (on loan from Grêmio) ^{List B}	(Brazil)	FW	18 May 1997 (aged 22)
22	Dmytro Shapoval	(Ukraine)	FW	17 June 1996 (aged 22)
26	Yuriy Kolomoyets	(Ukraine)	FW	22 March 1990 (aged 29)
77	Denys Vasin	(Ukraine)	FW	4 March 1989 (aged 30)

== Transfers ==
=== In ===
Date	Pos.	Player	Age	Moving from	Type	Fee	Source
Summer
23 June 2018	DF	(Ukraine) Yevhen Martynenko	24	(Ukraine) Chornomorets Odesa	Transfer	Undisclosed	
3 July 2018	MF	(Ukraine) Artem Habelok	23	Unattached	Transfer	Free	
3 July 2018	MF	(Ukraine) Maryan Mysyk	22	(Ukraine) Stal Kamianske	Transfer	Undisclosed	
1 August 2018	DF	(Brazil) Artur	23	(Brazil) Internacional	Transfer	Free	
3 September 2018	DF	(Ghana) Najeeb Yakubu	18	(Nigeria) Niger Tornadoes	Transfer	Undisclosed	
3 September 2018	DF	(Mali) Ibrahim Kane	18	(Mali) Duguwolofila	Transfer	Undisclosed	
1 August 2018	FW	(Brazil) Nicolas Careca	21	(Brazil) Grêmio	Loan		
Winter
22 January 2019	MF	(Serbia) Todor Petrović	24	(Serbia) Voždovac	Transfer	Free	
22 January 2019	MF	(Bosnia and Herzegovina) Edin Šehić	23	(Croatia) Hajduk Split	Transfer	Free	
1 January 2019	DF	(Ukraine) Ihor Honchar	25	(Ukraine) Hirnyk-Sport	Loan		

=== Out ===
Date	Pos.	Player	Age	Moving to	Type	Fee	Source
Summer
1 July 2018	GK	(Ukraine) Yan Vichnyi	21	Unattached	Transfer	Free	
1 July 2018	DF	(Ukraine) Oleksiy Lutsenko	21	Unattached	Transfer	Free	
1 July 2018	MF	(Ukraine) Yuriy Hluschuk	23	Unattached	Transfer	Free	
13 July 2018	DF	(Ukraine) Oleh Ostapenko	21	(Ukraine) Chornomorets Odesa	Transfer	Undisclosed	
13 September 2018	MF	(Ukraine) Serhiy Kosovskyi	20	(Ukraine) Obolon-Brovar Kyiv	Transfer	Free	
8 August 2018	GK	(Ukraine) Danylo Kanevtsev	22	(Ukraine) Metalist 1925 Kharkiv	Loan		
7 September 2018	DF	(Ukraine) Ihor Honchar	25	(Ukraine) Hirnyk-Sport	Loan		
Winter
1 January 2019	MF	(Armenia) Gegham Kadymyan	26	Unattached	Transfer	Free	
18 January 2019	FW	(Ukraine) Mykhaylo Serhiychuk	27	(Ukraine) Desna Chernihiv	Transfer	Free	
1 January 2019	FW	(Ukraine) Vladyslav Kulach	25	(Ukraine) Shakhtar Donetsk	Loan return		
14 February 2019	MF	(Ukraine) Volodymyr Odaryuk	25	(Ukraine) Hirnyk-Sport Horishni Plavni	Loan		
26 February 2019	DF	(Ukraine) Myroslav Mazur	20	(Moldova) Sfântul Gheorghe Suruceni	Loan		

== Pre-season and friendlies ==
24 June 2018 Friendly	Vorskla Poltava (Ukraine)	0–0	(Ukraine) SC Dnipro-1	Poltava
17:00 EEST (UTC+03:00)		Report		Stadium: Ltava Stadium

28 June 2018 Friendly	Vorskla Poltava (Ukraine)	1–0	(Slovakia) Žilina	Kranj, Slovenia
18:30 EEST (UTC+03:00)	Kolomoyets 6'	Report		Stadium: Stanko Mlakar Stadium

1 July 2018 Friendly	Vorskla Poltava (Ukraine)	1–3	(North Macedonia) Shkëndija	Rogatec, Slovenia
18:00 EEST (UTC+03:00)	Habelok 57'	Report	Emini 20'; Murati 64'; Selmani 68'	Attendance: 100

4 July 2018 Friendly	Vorskla Poltava (Ukraine)	2–1	(Serbia) Voždovac	Rogatec, Slovenia
EEST (UTC+03:00)	Odaryuk 22'; Kulach 51' (pen.)	Report	Ješić 13'	Attendance: 100

7 July 2018 Friendly	Celje (Slovenia)	2–0	(Ukraine) Vorskla Poltava	Celje, Slovenia
19:00 EEST (UTC+03:00)	Vancaš 36'; Novak 70'	Report		Stadium: Stadion Z'dežele; Attendance: 200

10 July 2018 Friendly	Vorskla Poltava (Ukraine)	2–1	(Croatia) Slaven Belupo	Rogatec, Slovenia
18:00 EEST (UTC+03:00)	Kolomoyets 45'; Martynenko 80'	Report	Mendy 66'	Attendance: 100

18 July 2018 Friendly	Vorskla Poltava (Ukraine)	0–1	(Ukraine) Desna Chernihiv	Poltava
17:00 EEST (UTC+03:00)		Report	Filippov 28'	Stadium: Ltava Stadium; Attendance: 100

1 August 2018 Friendly	Vorskla Poltava (Ukraine)	2–1	(Ukraine) Kremin Kremenchuk	Poltava
17:00 EEST (UTC+03:00)	Kobakhidze 28'; Nicolas Careca 39'	Report	Cherniy 64'	Stadium: Ltava Stadium; Attendance: 70

8 September 2018 Friendly	Vorskla Poltava (Ukraine)	5–4	(Ukraine) FC Oleksandriya	Poltava
16:00 EEST (UTC+03:00)	Kulach 21'; Careca 25'; Odaryuk 55'; Kolomoyets 75'; Mysyk 84'	Report	Kovalets 4'; Shastal 17', 23'; Hrytsuk 45'	Stadium: Ltava Stadium

16 January 2019 Friendly	Vorskla Poltava (Ukraine)	0–0	(Romania) CFR Cluj	Side, Turkey
16:00 EET (UTC+02:00)		Report		Stadium: Kamelya Collection

19 January 2019 Friendly	Vorskla Poltava (Ukraine)	0–3	(Romania) Universitatea Craiova	Belek, Turkey
16:00 EET (UTC+02:00)		Report	Mitriță 12'; Koljić 14'; Cristea 77' (pen.)

23 January 2019 Friendly	Vorskla Poltava (Ukraine)	Cancelled	(Uzbekistan) Pakhtakor Tashkent	Turkey
EET (UTC+02:00)		[ Report]

24 January 2019 Friendly	Vorskla Poltava (Ukraine)	0–0	(Iran) Padideh	Turkey
14:00 EET (UTC+02:00)		Report

27 January 2019 Friendly	Vorskla Poltava (Ukraine)	1–0	(Serbia) Mladost Lučani	Turkey
14:00 EET (UTC+02:00)	Careca 90' (pen.)	Report

2 February 2019 Friendly	Vorskla Poltava (Ukraine)	0–0	(Serbia) Radnik Surdulica	Manavgat, Turkey
15:30 EET (UTC+02:00)		Report		Stadium: Camelia hotel complex

4 February 2019 Friendly	Vorskla Poltava (Ukraine)	4–2	(Serbia) Spartak Subotica	Antalya, Turkey
15:00 EET (UTC+02:00)	Kobakhidze 24'; Šehić 52', 84'; Kerkez 65' (o.g.)	Report	Obradović 35'; Tekijaški 69'	Stadium: Topkapi sport complex

7 February 2019 Friendly	Vorskla Poltava (Ukraine)	0–2	(Bosnia and Herzegovina) Željezničar Sarajevo	Belek, Turkey
EET (UTC+02:00)		Report	Ramović 45+3'; Osmanković 59'	Stadium: Regnum hotel

10 February 2019 Friendly	Vorskla Poltava (Ukraine)	4–1	(Kazakhstan) Shakhter Karagandy	Belek, Turkey
16:30 EET (UTC+02:00)	Careca 15'; Kobakhidze 45+1'; Sharpar 71'; Šehić 74'	Report	Najaryan 82'	Stadium: Titanic hotel

13 February 2019 Friendly	Vorskla Poltava (Ukraine)	1–1	(Belarus) FC Gorodeya	Çolaklı, Turkey
16:00 EET (UTC+02:00)	Habelok 90+3'	Report	Pavlyuchek 14'	Stadium: Hane hotel

19 April 2019 Friendly	Dynamo Kyiv (Ukraine)	5–0	(Ukraine) Vorskla Poltava	Kyiv
14:00 EEST (UTC+03:00)	Mykolenko 9'; Tsitaishvili 27'; Andriyevskyi 31' de Pena 35'; Tsyhankov 64' (pen.)	Report		Stadium: Dynamo Stadium

== Competitions ==
=== Overall ===
Competition	First match	Last match	Starting round	Final position	Record							
Competition	First match	Last match	Starting round	Final position	Pld	W	D	L	GF	GA	GD	Win %
Premier League	25 July 2018	29 May 2019	Matchday 1	7th	32	12	6	14	31	43	−12	37.50
Cup	31 October 2018	7 April 2019	Round of 16 (1/8)	Quarterfinal	2	1	0	1	2	3	−1	50.00
Europa League	20 September 2018	13 December 2018	Group stage	Group stage	6	1	0	5	4	13	−9	16.67
Total					40	14	6	20	37	59	−22	35.00

Last updated: 31 May 2019
Source: Competitions

=== Premier League ===
==== League table ====
Pos	Team	Pld	W	D	L	GF	GA	GD	Pts	Qualification or relegation
7	Vorskla Poltava	32	12	6	14	31	43	−12	42	
8	Desna Chernihiv	32	12	5	15	35	41	−6	41	
9	Olimpik Donetsk	32	7	13	12	41	48	−7	34	
10	Karpaty Lviv (O)	32	8	9	15	44	53	−9	33	Qualification for the Relegation play-offs
11	Chornomorets Odesa (R)	32	8	7	17	31	49	−18	31	Qualification for the Relegation play-offs

Source: Ukrainian Premier League (in Ukrainian), UEFA, Soccerway
Rules for classification: 1) Points; 2) Head-to-head points; 3) Head-to-head goal difference; 4) Head-to-head higher number of goals scored; 5) Goal difference; 6) Higher number of goals scored; 7) Draw or "golden match" if tied for title (Article 22, paragraph 3).
(O) Play-off winners; (R) Relegated

Teams that placed 10th and 11th in the 2018–19 Ukrainian Premier League play two-leg play-off with the second and third teams of the 2018–19 Ukrainian First League. The draw for play-offs took place on 24 May 2019 and the games will be played on 4 and 8 June 2019.

Team 1	Agg.	Team 2	1st leg	2nd leg
Chornomorets Odesa	0 – 2	Kolos Kovalivka	0 – 0	0 – 2
Karpaty Lviv	3 – 1	Volyn Lutsk	0 – 0	3 – 1

=== First leg ===
4 June 2019
19:00 UTC+3

Chornomorets Odesa	0 – 0	Kolos Kovalivka
	Report

Chornomorets Stadium, Odesa
Attendance: 5,435
Referee: Anatoliy Abdula (Kharkiv)

4 June 2019
19:00 UTC+3

Karpaty Lviv	0 – 0	Volyn Lutsk
	Report

Ukraina Stadium, Lviv
Attendance: 10,104
Referee: Denys Shurman (Vyshneve)

=== Second leg ===
8 June 2019
17:00 UTC+3

Kolos Kovalivka	2 – 0	Chornomorets Odesa
Havrysh 57', 63' (pen.)	Report

Kolos Stadium, Kovalivka
Attendance: 2,500
Referee: Vitaliy Romanov

Kolos Kovalivka won 2–0 on aggregate and were promoted to the 2019–20 Ukrainian Premier League. Chornomorets Odesa were relegated to the 2019–20 Ukrainian First League

8 June 2019
19:00 UTC+3

Volyn Lutsk	0 – 3 ~~1 – 3~~	Karpaty Lviv
Kozhanov 42'	Report	Klyots 37'; Ponde 82' (pen.); Miroshnichenko 90+5'

Avanhard Stadium, Lutsk
Attendance: 5,200
Referee: Maksym Kozyryatskyi

Karpaty Lviv won 3–0 on aggregate and retained their spot in the 2019–20 Ukrainian Premier League. Volyn Lutsk remained in the 2019–20 Ukrainian First League

Due to fan violence at the game and attack on referee, the original score 1–3 was scratched and replaced with technical score 0–3 loss to Volyn and win for Karpaty. Additionally, the Lutsk department of police started criminal proceedings on the fact of intentional damage to property during the game by the Karpaty fans.

==== Results summary ====
Overall								Home						Away					
Pld	W	D	L	GF	GA	GD	Pts	W	D	L	GF	GA	GD	W	D	L	GF	GA	GD
32	12	6	14	31	43	−12	42	6	4	6	18	22	−4	6	2	8	13	21	−8

Last updated: 31 May 2019.
Source: Competitive matches

==== Results by round ====
Round	1	2	3	4	5	6	7	8	9	10	11	12	13	14	15	16	17	18	19	20	21	22	23	24	25	26	27	28	29	30	31	32
Ground	A	A	H	A	H	A	H	A	H	A	H	H	H	A	H	A	H	A	H	A	H	A	A	A	H	A	A	H	H	A	H	H
Result	L	L	W	L	W	L	W	W	W	W	L	L	W	W	L	L	L	W	L	L	D	D	L	L	D	W	D	D	W	W	L	D
Position	9	10	9	10	7	8	7	5	4	4	4	4	4	4	4	4	5	5	6	7	6	7	8	8	8	8	8	8	7	7	7	7

Updated to match(es) played on 31 May 2019. Source: Competitive matches
A = Away; H = Home; W = Win; D = Draw; L = Loss

==== Matches ====
25 July 2018 1	Dynamo Kyiv	1–0	Vorskla Poltava	Kyiv
19:00 EEST (UTC+03:00)	Dallku 33' (o.g.); Morozyuk (yellow card) 39'	Report	Chyzhov (yellow card) 37'; Kravchenko (yellow card) 46'; Kobakhidze (yellow card) 49'; Kulach (yellow card) 10'; Chesnakov (yellow card) 82'; Mysyk (yellow card) 84'	Stadium: NSC Olimpiyskiy; Attendance: 0 Referee: Viktor Kopiyevskyi

29 July 2018 2	Olimpik Donetsk	1–0	Vorskla Poltava	Kyiv
17:00 EEST (UTC+03:00)	Balashov 51'; Hennadiy Pasich (yellow card) 86'	Report	Dallku (yellow card) 14'; Mysyk (yellow card) 73'	Stadium: Dynamo Stadium; Attendance: 550; Referee: Ihor Paskhal

4 August 2018 3	Vorskla Poltava	1–0	FC Lviv	Lviv
17:00 EEST (UTC+03:00)	Kolomoyets (yellow card) 71' (yellow-red card) 90+1'; Kadymyan (yellow card) 75'; Careca 83', (yellow card) 90+3'	Report	Holikov (yellow card) 45' (yellow-red card) 90+1'	Stadium: Arena Lviv; Attendance: 2,000; Referee: Ivan Bondar

11 August 2018 4	Shakhtar Donetsk	4–1	Vorskla Poltava	Kharkiv
19:30 EEST (UTC+03:00)	Stepanenko (yellow card) 10', (goal) 59'; Marlos 50'; Khocholava 62'; Moraes 74'	Report	Sharpar 25'; Careca (yellow card) 30'; Habelok (yellow card) 53'	Stadium: OSC Metalist; Attendance: 6,438; Referee: Mykola Balakin

18 August 2018 5	Vorskla Poltava	2–1	FC Mariupol	Poltava
19:30 EEST (UTC+03:00)	Kulach 29'; Polehenko 88' (o.g.)	Report	Fomin 21'; Fedorchuk (yellow card) 32'; Churko (yellow card) 53'; Chobotenko (yellow card) 64'	Stadium: Vorskla Stadium; Attendance: 3,360; Referee: Yaroslav Kozyk

25 August 2018 6	FC Oleksandriya	2–0	Vorskla Poltava	Oleksandriya
17:00 EEST (UTC+03:00)	Banada 15', 17'; Protasov (yellow card) 50'	Report	Artur (yellow card) 24'; Sharpar (yellow card) 32'; Rebenok (yellow card) 40'; Chyzhov (yellow card) 60'; Kravchenko (yellow card) 62'	Stadium: CSC Nika Stadium; Attendance: 2,260; Referee: Maksym Kozyryanskyi

31 August 2018 7	Vorskla Poltava	2–1	Chornomorets Odesa	Poltava
19:00 EEST (UTC+03:00)	Sklyar (yellow card) 3'; Kulach 49'; Careca (yellow card) 73'; Sharpar (yellow card) 85'; Ryzhuk 88' (o.g.); Habelok (yellow card) 90+3'	Report	Smirnov (yellow card) 54'; Trubochkin (yellow card) 59'; Chorniy 63'; Hrachov (yellow card) 89'	Stadium: Vorskla Stadium; Attendance: 3,315; Referee: Kostiantyn Trukhanov

15 September 2018 8	Karpaty Lviv	0–1	Vorskla Poltava	Lviv
17:00 EEST (UTC+03:00)	Di Franco (yellow card) 21'; Carrascal (yellow card) 27'; Fedetskyi (yellow card) 62'; De Camargo (yellow card) 73'	Report	Dallku (yellow card) 17', (goal) 90+1'; Sharpar (yellow card) 41'	Stadium: Ukraina Stadium; Attendance: 1,756; Referee: Mykola Balakin

23 September 2018 9	Vorskla Poltava	2–1	Zorya Luhansk	Poltava
19:30 EEST (UTC+03:00)	Chesnakov (yellow card) 24'; Dallku (yellow card) 63'; Rebenok 64'; Kulach (yellow card) 68'; Serhiychuk (yellow card) 69'; Pryima 90' (o.g.); Shust (yellow card) 90+2'	Report	Mykhaylychenko (yellow card) 58'; Rafael Ratão (yellow card) 68'; Karavayev 70', (yellow card) 89'	Stadium: Vorskla Stadium; Attendance: 5,800; Referee: Serhiy Boyko

30 September 2018 10	Desna Chernihiv	0–2	Vorskla Poltava	Chernihiv
14:00 EEST (UTC+03:00)		Report	Kulach 4'; Chesnakov (yellow card) 28'; Sharpar 62'	Stadium: Chernihiv Stadium; Attendance: 2,847; Referee: Oleksandr Omelchenko

7 October 2018 11	Vorskla Poltava	0–2	Arsenal Kyiv	Poltava
19:30 EEST (UTC+03:00)	Chyzhov (yellow card) 35'	Report	Sahutkin (yellow card) 31'; Jevtoski (yellow card) 38'; Maydanevych (yellow card) 48'; Hryn 72', 79'	Stadium: Vorskla Stadium; Attendance: 1,444; Referee: Viktor Kopiyevskyi

20 October 2018 12	Vorskla Poltava	0–1	Dynamo Kyiv	Poltava
17:00 EEST (UTC+03:00)		Report	Buyalskyi (yellow card) 29'; Tsyhankov 40'; Kádár (yellow card) 59'; Harmash (yellow card) 83'	Stadium: Vorskla Stadium; Attendance: 6,700; Referee: Anatoliy Abdula

28 October 2018 13	Vorskla Poltava	2–1	Olimpik Donetsk	Poltava
19:30 EET (UTC+02:00)	Dallku (yellow card) 16' (yellow-red card) 33'; Snurnitsyn 44' (o.g.); Sapay (yellow card) 51'; Kulach 68'	Report	Politylo 16' (pen.); Ksyonz (yellow card) 87'	Stadium: Vorskla Stadium; Attendance: 1,757; Referee: Kostiantyn Trukhanov

4 November 2018 14	FC Lviv	0–2	Vorskla Poltava	Poltava
17:00 EET (UTC+02:00)	Bruno Duarte (yellow card) 35'; Jonatan Lima (yellow card) 70'; Araujo (yellow card) 89'	Report	Rebenok 19'; Yakubu 39'; Careca (yellow card) 66'; Chesnakov (yellow card) 90+2'	Stadium: Vorskla Stadium; Attendance: 1,400; Referee: Kateryna Monzul

11 November 2018 15	Vorskla Poltava	0–2	Shakhtar Donetsk	Poltava
19:30 EET (UTC+02:00)	Sklyar (yellow card) 66'	Report	Wellington Nem 19'; Maycon 41', (yellow card) 68'	Stadium: Vorskla Stadium; Attendance: 2,783; Referee: Maksym Kozyryanskyi

24 November 2018 16	FC Mariupol	1–0	Vorskla Poltava	Mariupol
14:00 EEST (UTC+03:00)	Vakula (yellow card) 29'; Ihnatenko (yellow card) 47'; Zubkov 57'; Demiri (yellow card) 59'; Yavorskyi (yellow card) 88'	Report	Sapay (yellow card) 51'; Sklyar (yellow card) 65'; Sharpar (yellow card) 68'	Stadium: Volodymyr Boiko Stadium; Attendance: 1,315; Referee: Dmytro Kutakov

3 December 2018 17	Vorskla Poltava	0–1	FC Oleksandriya	Poltava
17:00 EET (UTC+02:00)	Artur (yellow card) 14'; Chesnakov (yellow card) 19'; Sapay (yellow card) 51'; Perduta (yellow card) 74'; Sklyar (yellow card) 78'; Kulach (yellow card) 81'	Report	Kovalets 4', (yellow card) 73'; Mykytsey (yellow card) 17'; Banada (yellow card) 55'	Stadium: Vorskla Stadium; Attendance: 951; Referee: Vitaliy Romanov

8 December 2018 18	Chornomorets Odesa	0–1	Vorskla Poltava	Odesa
17:00 EET (UTC+02:00)	Ostapenko (yellow card) 45+1'; Koval (yellow card) 90+2'	Report	Chyzhov 4', (yellow card) 28'; Sakiv (yellow card) 84'	Stadium: Chornomorets Odesa; Attendance: 3,250; Referee: Volodymyr Novokhatniy

24 February 2019 19	Vorskla Poltava	0–4	Karpaty Lviv	Poltava
17:00 EET (UTC+02:00)	Taraduda (yellow card) 47'; Sklyar (yellow card) 73'; Šehić (yellow card) 85'; Kolomoyets (yellow card) 89'	Report	Debelko (yellow card) 7'; Di Franco 25', (yellow card) 71'; Shved 51' (pen.), 55', 90+1'; Hutsulyak (yellow card) 60'; Gueye (yellow card) 85'	Stadium: Vorskla Stadium; Attendance: 1,115; Referee: Kostiantyn Trukhanov

3 March 2019 20	Zorya Luhansk	3–0	Vorskla Poltava	Zaporizhia
14:00 EET (UTC+02:00)	Hromov (yellow card) 24', (goal) 62'; Silas (yellow card) 29', (goal) 45+1'; Karavayev 77'; Vernydub (yellow card) 88'	Report	Šehić (yellow card) 11'; Artur (yellow card) 26'; Sklyar (yellow card) 54'; Chyzhov (yellow card) 71'; Vasin (yellow card) 87'	Stadium: Slavutych-Arena; Attendance: 2,115; Referee: Mykola Balakin

9 March 2019 21	Vorskla Poltava	0–0	Desna Chernihiv	Poltava
17:00 EET (UTC+02:00)	Kane (yellow card) 20' (yellow-red card) 83'; Giorgadze (yellow card) 32'; Chyzhov (yellow card) 39' (yellow-red card) 90+3'; Habelok (yellow card) 60'	Report	Mostovyi (yellow card) 25'; Bezborodko (yellow card) 71'; Filippov (yellow card) 72'; Volkov (yellow card) 87'	Stadium: Vorskla Stadium; Attendance: 1,602; Referee: Vitaliy Romanov

18 March 2019 22	Arsenal Kyiv	2–2	Vorskla Poltava	Kyiv
17:00 EET (UTC+02:00)	Vakulenko 8', 90' (pen.); Kadymyan (yellow card) 54'; Pidkivka (yellow card) 90+3'	Report	Sharpar 24' (pen.), 56' (pen.); Kolomoyets (yellow card) 55'; Giorgadze (yellow card) 56'; Perduta (yellow card) 83'; Rebenok (yellow card) 90+2'	Stadium: Dynamo Stadium; Attendance: 732; Referee: Maksym Kozyryatskyi

2 April 2019 23	Karpaty Lviv	4–0	Vorskla Poltava	Lviv
17:00 EEST (UTC+03:00)	Ponde 26'; Shved 38', 62'; Myakushko (yellow card) 59'; Yoda 70' (pen.)	Report	Chesnakov (yellow card) 60'; Perduta (yellow card) 90+2'	Stadium: Ukraina Stadium; Attendance: 2,231; Referee: Dmytro Kryvushkin

14 April 2019 24	Arsenal Kyiv	1–0	Vorskla Poltava	Kyiv
17:00 EEST (UTC+03:00)	Kadymyan (yellow card) 31'; Dombrovskyi (yellow card) 35'; Kalitvintsev 58'; Tankovskyi (yellow card) 79'	Report	Perduta (yellow card) 37'; Chesnakov (yellow card) 43'; Sapay (yellow card) 57' (yellow-red card) 82'; Petrović (yellow card) 59'; Mysyk (yellow card) 80'	Stadium: Dynamo Stadium; Attendance: 490; Referee: Viktor Kopiyevskyi

23 April 2019 25	Vorskla Poltava	3–3	Desna Chernihiv	Poltava
19:30 EEST (UTC+03:00)	Martynenko (yellow card) 29'; Habelok 52'; Kobakhidze (yellow card) 55'; Sharpar 62' (pen.); Careca 71'	Report	Serhiychuk 2' (pen.), 42'; Khlyobas 14'; Mostovyi (yellow card) 27'; Artem Favorov (yellow card) 84'	Stadium: Vorskla Stadium; Attendance: 1,215; Referee: Volodymyr Novokhatniy

27 April 2019 26	Chornomorets Odesa	1–2	Vorskla Poltava	Odesa
14:00 EEST (UTC+03:00)	Vilhjálmsson 2'; Hrachov (yellow card) 39'	Report	Sapay (yellow card) 35'; Kane (yellow card) 44'; Vasin 84' (pen.); Habelok 90+1'	Stadium: Chornomorets Odesa; Attendance: 3,200; Referee: Kostiantyn Trukhanov

5 May 2019 27	Olimpik Donetsk	1–1	Vorskla Poltava	Kyiv
14:00 EEST (UTC+03:00)	Ksyonz (yellow card) 36'; Tsymbalyuk (yellow card) 50'; Valeyev (yellow card) 58'; Hennadiy Pasich 63', (yellow card) 67'	Report	Chesnakov 39'; Habelok (yellow card) 70'; Martynenko (red card) 86'; Rebenok (yellow card) 90+1'	Stadium: Dynamo Stadium; Attendance: 520; Referee: Dmytro Kutakov

12 May 2019 28	Vorskla Poltava	1–1	Karpaty Lviv	Poltava
19:30 EEST (UTC+03:00)	Rebenok 15'; Sharpar (yellow card) 24'; Šehić (yellow card) 65'	Report	Sandokhadze (yellow card) 34'; Di Franco (yellow card) 54'; Mehremić (yellow card) 85'; Debelko 88'	Stadium: Vorskla Stadium; Attendance: 1,419; Referee: Serhiy Boyko

18 May 2019 29	Vorskla Poltava	2–0	Arsenal Kyiv	Poltava
14:00 EEST (UTC+03:00)	Kolomoyets 6'; Vasin (yellow card) 41', (goal) 58'; Sklyar (yellow card) 63'	Report	Tankovskyi (yellow card) 21'; Vakulenko (yellow card) 50'	Stadium: Vorskla Stadium; Attendance: 1,307; Referee: Yaroslav Kozyk

21 May 2019 30	Desna Chernihiv	0–1	Vorskla Poltava	Chernihiv
17:00 EEST (UTC+03:00)	Bezborodko (yellow card) 45'	Report	Petrović 30'; Kolomoyets (yellow card) 38'; Vasin (yellow card) 63'; Tkachenko (yellow card) 80'; Šehić (yellow card) 82'; Martynenko (yellow card) 86'	Stadium: Chernihiv Stadium; Attendance: 2,059; Referee: Dmytro Kutakov

25 May 2019 31	Vorskla Poltava	1–2	Chornomorets Odesa	Poltava
17:00 EEST (UTC+03:00)	Chesnakov (yellow card) 28' (yellow-red card) 68'; Kolomoyets 54'	Report	Koval 26'; Ryzhuk (yellow card) 30'; Tanchyk 62'; Trubochkin (yellow card) 81'; Babenko (yellow card) 84'	Stadium: Vorskla Stadium; Attendance: 1,050; Referee: Serhiy Boyko

29 May 2019 32	Vorskla Poltava	2–2	Olimpik Donetsk	Poltava
17:00 EEST (UTC+03:00)	Sharpar 5'; Vasin 44' (pen.); Sakiv (yellow card) 79'	Report	Klymenchuk (yellow card) 44'; Dehtyarev 75', 83'	Stadium: Vorskla Stadium; Attendance: 1,053; Referee: Anatoliy Abdula

=== Ukrainian Cup ===
31 October 2018 Round of 16 (1/8)	Chornomorets Odesa	1–2	Vorskla Poltava	Odesa
17:00 EET (UTC+02:00)	Savchenko (yellow card) 30'; Karnoza (yellow card) 61'; Hrachov 69'; Norenkov (yellow card) 90+8'	Report	Sakiv 60'; Careca 63' (pen.); Sklyar (yellow card) 90+5'	Stadium: Chornomorets Odesa; Attendance: 2,639; Referee: Viktor Kopiyevskyi

7 April 2018 Quarterfinal	SC Dnipro-1	2–0	Vorskla Poltava	Dnipro
17:00 EET (UTC+02:00)	Kulish 78'; Kohut 83'	Report	Careca (yellow card) 13'	Stadium: Dnipro-Arena; Attendance: 9,148; Referee: Yuriy Mozharovskyi

=== UEFA Europa League ===
==== Group stage ====
Pos	Team	Pld	W	D	L	GF	GA	GD	Pts	Qualification	ARS	SPO	VOR	QRB
1	(England) Arsenal	6	5	1	0	12	2	+10	16	Advance to knockout phase	—	0–0	4–2	1–0
2	(Portugal) Sporting CP	6	4	1	1	13	3	+10	13	Advance to knockout phase	0–1	—	3–0	2–0
3	(Ukraine) Vorskla Poltava	6	1	0	5	4	13	−9	3 (Note: Goal difference in all group matches: Vorskla Poltava –9, Qarabağ –11.)		0–3	1–2	—	0–1
4	(Azerbaijan) Qarabağ	6	1	0	5	2	13	−11	3		0–3	1–6	0–1	—

Source: UEFA
Rules for classification: Group stage tiebreakers
Notes:

20 September 2018 1	Arsenal (England)	4–2	(Ukraine) Vorskla Poltava	London, England
22:00 EEST (UTC+03:00)	Aubameyang 32', 56'; Welbeck 48'; Özil 74'	Report	Sharpar (yellow card) 19', (goal) 90+3'; Chesnakov 77'	Stadium: Emirates Stadium; Attendance: 59,039; Referee: Bart Vertenten

4 October 2018 2	Vorskla Poltava (Ukraine)	1–2	(Portugal) Sporting CP	Poltava
20:00 EEST (UTC+03:00)	Artur (yellow card) 9'; Kulach 10'	Report	Acuña (yellow card) 73'; Montero 90'; Cabral 90+3'	Stadium: Vorskla Stadium; Attendance: 10,082; Referee: Nikola Dabanović

25 October 2018 3	Qarabağ (Azerbaijan)	0–1	(Ukraine) Vorskla Poltava	Baku, Azerbaijan
20:00 EEST (UTC+03:00)	Zoubir (yellow card) 64'	Report	Kulach (yellow card) 4', (goal) 48'; Perduta (yellow card) 41'; Dallku (yellow card) 79'; Serhiychuk (yellow card) 87'	Stadium: Baku Olympic Stadium; Attendance: 22,450; Referee: Roi Reinshreiber

8 November 2018 4	Vorskla Poltava (Ukraine)	0–1	(Azerbaijan) Qarabağ	Poltava
22:00 EET (UTC+02:00)	Yakubu (yellow card) 52'; Sklyar (yellow card) 63'; Chyzhov (yellow card) 81'; Sharpar (yellow card) 90+6'	Report	Abdullayev 13' (pen.); Guerrier (yellow card) 34'; Medvedev (yellow card) 56'	Stadium: Vorskla Stadium; Attendance: 5,479; Referee: Sandro Schärer

29 November 2018 5	Vorskla Poltava (Ukraine)	0–3	(England) Arsenal	Kyiv
19:55 EET (UTC+02:00)	Sklyar (yellow card) 29'; Sharpar (yellow card) 32'; Kolomoyets (yellow card) 72'	Report	Smith Rowe 11'; Ramsey 27' (pen.); Willock 41'; Holding (yellow card) 53'	Stadium: NSC Olimpiyskiy; Attendance: 7,751; Referee: Bartosz Frankowski

13 December 2018 6	Sporting CP (Portugal)	3–0	(Ukraine) Vorskla Poltava	Lisbon, Portugal
22:00 EET (UTC+02:00)	Montero 17'; Petrović (yellow card) 25'; Miguel Luís 35'; Dallku 44' (o.g.)	Report		Stadium: Estádio José Alvalade; Referee: Manuel Schuettengruber

== Statistics ==
=== Appearances and goals ===
No.	Pos	Nat	Player	Total		Premier League		Cup		EL	
No.	Pos	Nat	Player	Apps	Goals	Apps	Goals	Apps	Goals	Apps	Goals
Goalkeepers
1	GK	(Ukraine) UKR	Bohdan Shust	27	0	22	0	0	0	5	0
21	GK	(Ukraine) UKR	Oleksandr Tkachenko	13	0	10	0	2	0	1	0
Defenders
3	DF	(Georgia (country)) GEO	Andro Giorgadze	9	0	6+2	0	1	0	0	0
5	DF	(Ghana) GHA	Najeeb Yakubu	8	1	4+1	1	1	0	2	0
17	DF	(Ukraine) UKR	Volodymyr Chesnakov	32	2	24+1	1	1	0	6	1
23	DF	(Ukraine) UKR	Vadym Sapay	21	0	16+1	0	1+1	0	2	0
25	DF	(Ukraine) UKR	Yevhen Martynenko	13	0	12	0	1	0	0	0
33	DF	(Ukraine) UKR	Oleksandr Chyzhov	19	1	15	1	1	0	2+1	0
40	DF	(Ukraine) UKR	Taras Sakiv	14	1	7+3	0	2	1	1+1	0
44	DF	(Kosovo) KOS	Ardin Dallku	24	1	14+4	1	0+1	0	5	0
48	DF	(Ukraine) UKR	Denys Taraduda	1	0	1	0	0	0	0	0
50	DF	(Mali) MLI	Ibrahim Kane	14	0	7+3	0	2	0	0+2	0
Midfielders
4	MF	(Ukraine) UKR	Ihor Perduta	34	0	27	0	1	0	6	0
6	MF	(Ukraine) UKR	Oleksandr Sklyar	31	0	14+9	0	2	0	5+1	0
8	MF	(Ukraine) UKR	Artem Habelok	25	2	14+7	2	2	0	1+1	0
9	MF	(Bosnia and Herzegovina) BIH	Edin Šehić	9	0	4+5	0	0	0	0	0
11	MF	(Ukraine) UKR	Vyacheslav Sharpar	33	7	27	6	1	0	5	1
13	MF	(Ukraine) UKR	Maryan Mysyk	14	0	3+10	0	1	0	0	0
29	MF	(Ukraine) UKR	Dmytro Kravchenko	11	0	8+1	0	0	0	2	0
30	MF	(Georgia (country)) GEO	Aleksandre Kobakhidze	17	0	13+3	0	0	0	1	0
66	MF	(Brazil) BRA	Artur	25	0	17+3	0	0	0	5	0
82	MF	(Ukraine) UKR	Pavlo Rebenok	36	3	24+6	3	0	0	6	0
94	MF	(Serbia) SRB	Todor Petrović	9	1	7+1	1	0+1	0	0	0
Forwards
14	FW	(Brazil) BRA	Nicolas Careca	31	3	14+10	2	2	1	1+4	0
26	FW	(Ukraine) UKR	Yuriy Kolomoyets	33	2	20+6	2	0+1	0	5+1	0
77	FW	(Ukraine) UKR	Denys Vasin	8	3	7+1	3	0	0	0	0
Players transferred out during the season
7	MF	(Armenia) ARM	Gegham Kadymyan	4	0	1+3	0	0	0	0	0
9	FW	(Ukraine) UKR	Mykhaylo Serhiychuk	15	0	1+9	0	0+1	0	0+4	0
10	FW	(Ukraine) UKR	Vladyslav Kulach	19	6	13+1	4	0	0	5	2
16	DF	(Ukraine) UKR	Myroslav Mazur	1	0	0	0	0+1	0	0	0
19	MF	(Ukraine) UKR	Volodymyr Odaryuk	4	0	0+3	0	1	0	0	0

Source: Competitions

Last updated: 31 May 2019

=== Goalscorers ===
Rank	No.	Pos	Nat	Name	Premier League	Cup	EL	Total
1	11	MF	(Ukraine)	Vyacheslav Sharpar	6	0	1	7
2	10	FW	(Ukraine)	Vladyslav Kulach	4	0	2	6
3	82	MF	(Ukraine)	Pavlo Rebenok	3	0	0	3
3	14	FW	(Brazil)	Nicolas Careca	2	1	0	3
3	77	FW	(Ukraine)	Denys Vasin	3	0	0	3
6	8	MF	(Ukraine)	Artem Habelok	2	0	0	2
6	17	DF	(Ukraine)	Volodymyr Chesnakov	1	0	1	2
6	26	FW	(Ukraine)	Yuriy Kolomoyets	2	0	0	2
9	5	DF	(Ghana)	Najeeb Yakubu	1	0	0	1
9	33	DF	(Ukraine)	Oleksandr Chyzhov	1	0	0	1
9	40	DF	(Ukraine)	Taras Sakiv	0	1	0	1
9	44	DF	(Kosovo)	Ardin Dallku	1	0	0	1
9	94	MF	(Serbia)	Todor Petrović	1	0	0	1
				Own goal	4	0	0	4
				Total	31	2	4	37

Last updated: 31 May 2019

=== Clean sheets ===
Rank	No.	Pos	Nat	Name	Premier League	Cup	EL	Total
1	1	GK	(Ukraine)	Bohdan Shust	6	0	1	7
2	1	GK	(Ukraine)	Oleksandr Tkachenko	2	0	0	2
				Total	8	0	1	9

Last updated: 31 May 2019

=== Disciplinary record ===
No.	Pos	Nat	Player	Premier League			Cup			EL			Total		
No.	Pos	Nat	Player	Booked	(yellow card) (yellow-red card)	Sent off (straight red)	Booked	(yellow card) (yellow-red card)	Sent off (straight red)	Booked	(yellow card) (yellow-red card)	Sent off (straight red)	Booked	(yellow card) (yellow-red card)	Sent off (straight red)
1	GK	(Ukraine)	Bohdan Shust	1	0	0	0	0	0	0	0	0	1	0	0
3	DF	(Georgia (country))	Andro Giorgadze	2	0	0	0	0	0	0	0	0	2	0	0
4	MF	(Ukraine)	Ihor Perduta	4	0	0	0	0	0	1	0	0	5	0	0
5	DF	(Ghana)	Najeeb Yakubu	0	0	0	0	0	0	1	0	0	1	0	0
6	MF	(Ukraine)	Oleksandr Sklyar	7	0	0	1	0	0	2	0	0	10	0	0
7	MF	(Armenia)	Gegham Kadymyan	1	0	0	0	0	0	0	0	0	1	0	0
8	MF	(Ukraine)	Artem Habelok	4	0	0	0	0	0	0	0	0	4	0	0
9	MF	(Bosnia and Herzegovina)	Edin Šehić	4	0	0	0	0	0	0	0	0	4	0	0
9	FW	(Ukraine)	Mykhaylo Serhiychuk	1	0	0	0	0	0	1	0	0	2	0	0
10	FW	(Ukraine)	Vladyslav Kulach	3	0	0	0	0	0	1	0	0	4	0	0
11	MF	(Ukraine)	Vyacheslav Sharpar	5	0	0	0	0	0	3	0	0	8	0	0
13	MF	(Ukraine)	Maryan Mysyk	3	0	0	0	0	0	0	0	0	3	0	0
14	FW	(Brazil)	Nicolas Careca	4	0	0	1	0	0	0	0	0	5	0	0
17	DF	(Ukraine)	Volodymyr Chesnakov	7	1	0	0	0	0	0	0	0	7	1	0
21	GK	(Ukraine)	Oleksandr Tkachenko	1	0	0	0	0	0	0	0	0	1	0	0
23	DF	(Ukraine)	Vadym Sapay	4	1	0	0	0	0	0	0	0	4	1	0
25	DF	(Ukraine)	Yevhen Martynenko	2	0	1	0	0	0	0	0	0	2	0	1
26	FW	(Ukraine)	Yuriy Kolomoyets	3	1	0	0	0	0	1	0	0	4	1	0
29	MF	(Ukraine)	Dmytro Kravchenko	2	0	0	0	0	0	0	0	0	2	0	0
30	MF	(Georgia (country))	Aleksandre Kobakhidze	2	0	0	0	0	0	0	0	0	2	0	0
33	DF	(Ukraine)	Oleksandr Chyzhov	5	1	0	0	0	0	1	0	0	6	1	0
40	DF	(Ukraine)	Taras Sakiv	2	0	0	0	0	0	0	0	0	2	0	0
44	DF	(Kosovo)	Ardin Dallku	3	1	0	0	0	0	1	0	0	4	1	0
48	DF	(Ukraine)	Denys Tarduda	1	0	0	0	0	0	0	0	0	1	0	0
50	DF	(Mali)	Ibrahim Kane	1	1	0	0	0	0	0	0	0	1	1	0
66	MF	(Brazil)	Artur	3	0	0	0	0	0	1	0	0	4	0	0
77	FW	(Ukraine)	Denys Vasin	3	0	0	0	0	0	0	0	0	3	0	0
82	MF	(Ukraine)	Pavlo Rebenok	3	0	0	0	0	0	0	0	0	3	0	0
94	MF	(Serbia)	Todor Petrović	1	0	0	0	0	0	0	0	0	1	0	0
			Total	81	6	1	2	0	0	13	0	0	97	6	1

Last updated: 31 May 2019
