= Sveti Jurij, Rogatec =

Sveti Jurij
- Location in Slovenia
- Coordinates: 46°15′9.02″N 15°44′14.43″E
- Country: Slovenia
- Traditional region: Styria
- Statistical region: Savinja
- Municipality: Rogatec

Area
  - Total: 2.61 km^{2} (1.01 sq mi)
- Elevation: 302.3 m (992 ft)

Population (2002)
  - Total: 130

Sveti Jurij (pronounced [ˈsʋeːti ˈjuːɾii̯]) is a settlement in the Municipality of Rogatec in eastern Slovenia. It lies northeast of the town of Rogatec, east of Donačka Gora, and south of Mount Saint Donatus. It is sometimes known as Sveti Jurij pri Donački Gori (literally, Sveti Jurij near Donačka Gora) to differentiate it from other settlements with the same name. The entire Rogatec area is part of the traditional region of Styria. It is now included in the Savinja Statistical Region.

The local church, from which the settlement gets its name, is dedicated to Saint George (Slovene: sveti Jurij) and belongs to the Parish of Rogatec. It was originally a Late Gothic church, extensively rebuilt in the 17th, 18th, and 19th centuries.
