= Blasius Kozenn =

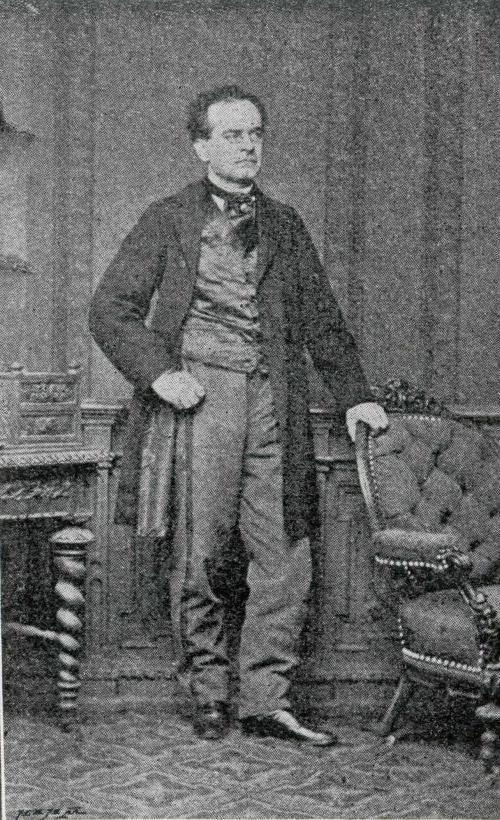
- Blasius Kozenn
- Born: 24 January 1821; Hotunje, Austrian Empire
- Died: 29 May 1871 (aged 50); Hernals, Austria-Hungary
- Education: Mathematics, physics, natural history
- Alma mater: University of Vienna
- Occupation: Cartographer

Blasius Kozenn (Slovenized: Blaž Kocen; 24 January 1821 – 29 May 1871) was a Slovenian geographer and cartographer. He has occasionally been misidentified as Slovak.

The name Kozenn was familiar to generations of former pupils in Austria-Hungary because Kozenn's school atlas was published in millions of copies in more than 100 editions and in many languages. It was one of the most commonly used atlases in the Austrian half of Austria-Hungary.

== Life ==
Blasius Kozenn was born into a poor farming family in the village of Hotunje, not far from Ponikva, and baptized Blash Kozen. After attending elementary school in Ponikva, he attended the upper secondary school in Celje, where he was accepted through the efforts of his elementary school teacher. He continued his studies in Graz and Klagenfurt, where he studied theology. He was ordained a priest in 1845.

Kozenn served as a curate in Rogatec from 1849 to 1850. From 1850 to 1852 he held the position of assistant instructor (German: Supplent) at the Celje upper secondary school. After this he traveled to Vienna, where he studied mathematics, physics, and natural history at the University of Vienna, passing his teaching exams in these subjects with distinction. In 1854 he was accepted into the civil service and became an upper secondary school instructor, first in Ljubljana, and then from 1855 to 1858 in Gorizia. This was where he wrote his Grundzüge der Geographie für die 1. Classe der Mittel- und Bürgerschulen (Essentials of Geography for the First Class of High School; first published in 1858 in Budapest and Vienna) and his study Das Klima von Görz (The Climate of Gorizia). In 1858 he started teaching at the German-language Imperial Upper Secondary School in Olomouc, where he remained until his early retirement in 1870. He was active in the introduction of the new Realschule secondary school, and in 1863 he was named a member of the school inspectorate.

As a result of poor health, he moved from Olomouc to the Vienna suburb of Hernals, where he died at his home on Stiftsgasse (since 1894 Geblergasse) from typhoid fever on 29 May 1871 at the age of 50.

== School atlas ==
In Olomouc Kozenn became acquainted with the bookseller and publisher Eduard Hölzel, who convinced him to create the first Austrian school atlas. This was finally published in 1861, after Hölzel moved to Vienna. As sources for his maps, he used Adolf Stieler's and Heinrich Kiepert's German atlases. He did not shy away from directly copying and only slightly modifying German school atlases of the time.

In 1900 Kozenn's atlas was fully revised by Vinzenz von Haardt, Friedrich Umlauft, Wilhelm Schmidt, and Franz Heiderich with regard to content, maps, and technical aspects; as such, it was comparable to the best atlases produced abroad. The success of Hölzel's publishing company encouraged the imperial government to issue other modern school atlases. Competition on the market resulted on the production of increasingly better atlases, including increasingly more thematic maps. The atlas was later revised further by Heinrich Güttenberger, Hermann Leiter, Hans Slanar, and Walter Strzygowski (after 1956).

As a self-taught cartographer, Kozenn also produced numerous wall maps for schools.
