= Dallku =

Dallku is an Albanian surname. Notable people with the surname include:

- Ardin Dallku (born 1994), Kosovan football player
- Armend Dallku (born 1983), Albanian football player and manager
