= Hotunje =

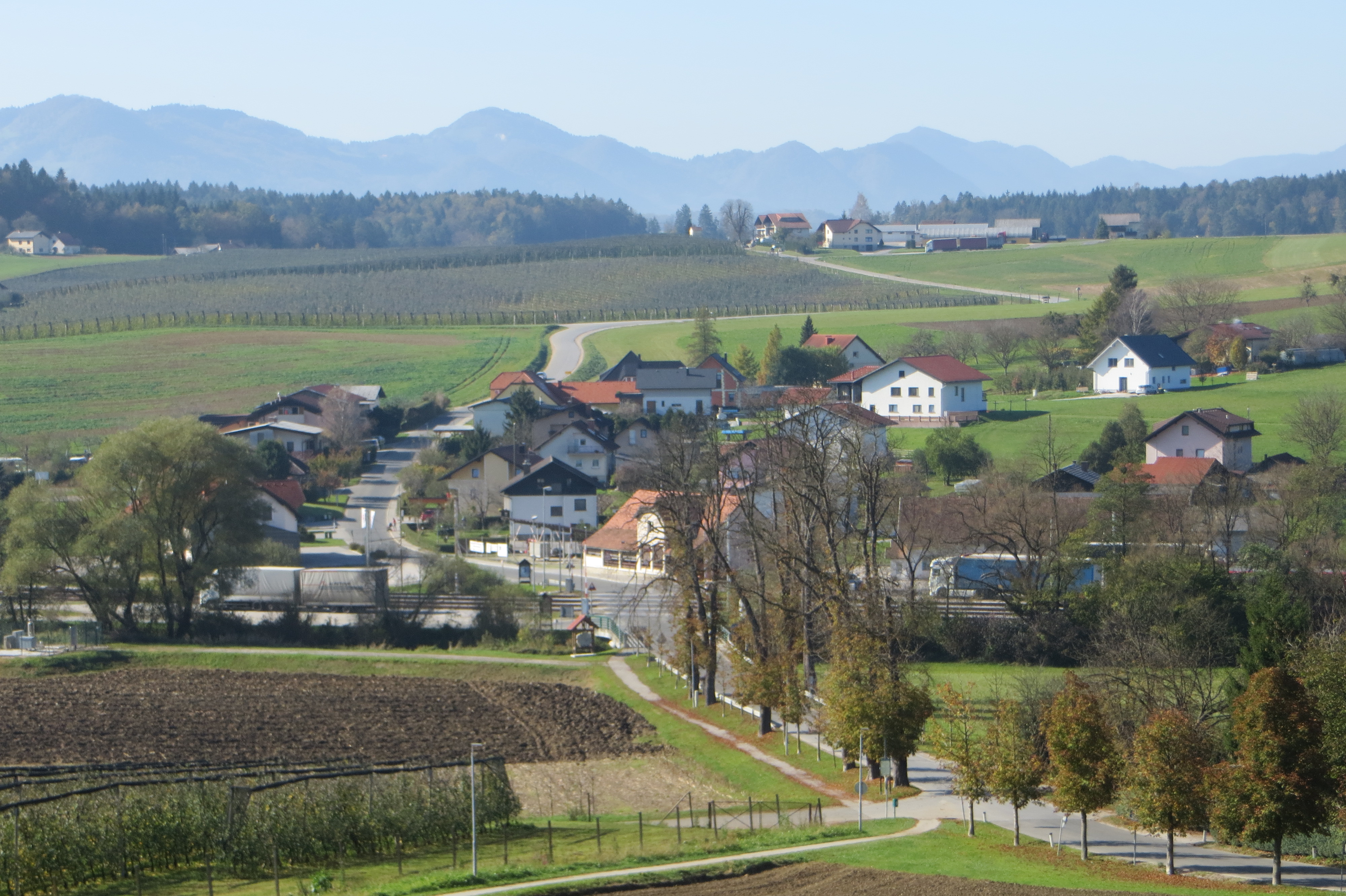

- Location in Slovenia
- Coordinates: 46°15′6.03″N 15°25′24.47″E
- Country: Slovenia
- Traditional region: Styria
- Statistical region: Savinja
- Municipality: Šentjur

Area
  - Total: 2.1 km^{2} (0.81 sq mi)
- Elevation: 309.8 m (1,016 ft)

Population (2020)
  - Total: 293
  - Density: 140/km^{2} (360/sq mi)

Hotunje (pronounced [xɔˈtuːnjɛ]) is a village west of Ponikva in the Municipality of Šentjur, in eastern Slovenia. The settlement, and the municipality, are included in the Savinja Statistical Region, which is in the Slovenian portion of the historical Duchy of Styria.

The railway line from Ljubljana to Maribor runs along the eastern edge of the settlement. The local railway station dates to the time the Austrian Southern Railway was being built between 1845 and 1846.

== Notable people ==
Notable people that were born or lived in Hotunje include:

- Blasius Kozenn (1821–1871), geographer and cartographer
