= Jože Šmit =

Slovene poet, translator, editor, and journalist

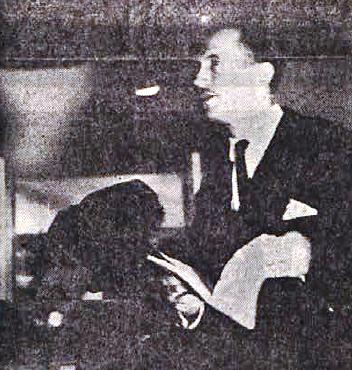
- Born: 1 February 1922; Tlake, Kingdom of Serbs, Croats and Slovenes (now in Slovenia)
- Died: 7 February 2004 (aged 82); Ljubljana, Slovenia
- Occupations: Poet; translator; editor; journalist
- Writing career
- Notable work: Kako bomo umirali
- Notable awards: Levstik Award; 1970 for Kako bomo umirali

Jože Šmit (1 February 1922 – 7 February 2004) was a Slovene poet, translator, editor and journalist.

Šmit was born in the village of Tlake near Rogatec in eastern Slovenia in 1922. The house in which he was born and spent his childhood is preserved on a new location at the Rogatec Open-Air Museum where it was moved to in 1981 as a typical example of an early 19th-century Sub-Pannonian house. He studied forestry at Vienna between 1942 and 1943 and was drafted into the German Army. During the Invasion of Normandy he was captured and sent to England as a prisoner of war and then to Italy, where he joined the Overseas Brigade of the Yugoslav Liberation Army and returned to Yugoslavia. After the war he worked as a journalist and studied Comparative literature and Slavic languages and literature at the University of Ljubljana, but was sent to work in Litija and abandoned his studies. He worked as an editor and proof-reader and is also known for his translations, particularly for his translation from the Latin of the poet Catullus. He also wrote prose and poetry for young children. He died in Ljubljana in 2004.

In 1970 he won the Levstik Award for his poetry collection Kako bomo umirali (How We Shall Die).

== Published works ==
Poetry collections

- Srce v bedi (The Heart in Poverty), 1950
- Dvojni cvet (The Double Flower), 1953
- Trepetlika (The Trembling Poplar), 1962
- Lirika časa (Lyrics of Time), 1965
- Lirična postila (A Lyrical Fasting Book), 1965
- Kolosej iz cedelike (The Strainer Colosseum), 1967
- Kako bomo umirali (How We Shall Die), 1970
- Zlo stoletja (The Evil of the Century), 1971
- Hoja za Katulom (Walking after Catullus), 1972
- Grenki med (Bitter Honey), 1990

Prose for Young Readers

- Marjetka (Little Margaret), 1951
- Kaj nam je popisal Jakec (What Little Jack Told Us), 1953
- Pol za šalo pol za res (Half For Fun and Half Seriously), 1956
- Kdo živi v tej kišici (Who Lives in This Little House), 1959
- Ježek se ženi (The Hedgehog's Wedding), 1974
