= Trlično =

- Location in Slovenia
- Coordinates: 46°12′52″N 15°46′42.37″E
- Country: Slovenia
- Traditional region: Styria
- Statistical region: Savinja
- Municipality: Rogatec

Area
  - Total: 0.85 km^{2} (0.33 sq mi)
- Elevation: 261.3 m (857 ft)

Population (2002)
  - Total: 110

Trlično (pronounced [təɾˈliːtʃnɔ]) is a settlement in the Municipality of Rogatec in eastern Slovenia. It is a dispersed settlement that stretches along the border with Croatia east of Dobovec pri Rogatcu. The entire Rogatec area is part of the traditional region of Styria. It is now included in the Savinja Statistical Region.

== Mass grave ==
Trlično is the site of a mass grave from the end of the Second World War. The Trlično Mass Grave (Slovene: Grobišče Trlično) is located along Sotla Creek, 300 meters (980 ft) east of the border crossing at Dobovec pri Rogatcu. It contains the remains of several dozen Croatians, and perhaps also Banat Swabians, that were killed in May 1945.
