= Brezovec pri Rogatcu =

- Location in Slovenia
- Coordinates: 46°13′41.5″N 15°40′57.7″E
- Country: Slovenia
- Traditional region: Styria
- Statistical region: Savinja
- Municipality: Rogatec

Area
  - Total: 1.71 km^{2} (0.66 sq mi)
- Elevation: 225 m (738 ft)

Population (2002)
  - Total: 58

Brezovec pri Rogatcu (pronounced [ˈbɾeːzɔʋəts pɾi ɾɔˈɡaːtsu]) is a settlement west of the town of Rogatec in eastern Slovenia. The area is part of the traditional region of Styria. It is now included in the Savinja Statistical Region.

== Name ==
The name of the settlement was changed from Brezovec to Brezovec pri Rogatcu in 1953.

== Cultural heritage ==
There is a small chapel-shrine in the settlement that contains a statue of Our Lady of Lourdes. It was built in the early 20th century.
