= Žahenberc =

- Location in Slovenia
- Coordinates: 46°14′24.41″N 15°44′1.69″E
- Country: Slovenia
- Traditional region: Styria
- Statistical region: Savinja
- Municipality: Rogatec

Area
  - Total: 4.04 km^{2} (1.56 sq mi)
- Elevation: 301.4 m (989 ft)

Population (2002)
  - Total: 285

Žahenberc (pronounced [ˈʒaːxɛmbɛɾts]) is a settlement in the Municipality of Rogatec in eastern Slovenia. The entire Rogatec area is part of the traditional region of Styria. It is now included in the Savinja Statistical Region.
