= Strmol Mansion =

Coordinates: 46°13′45.84″N 15°41′48.12″E

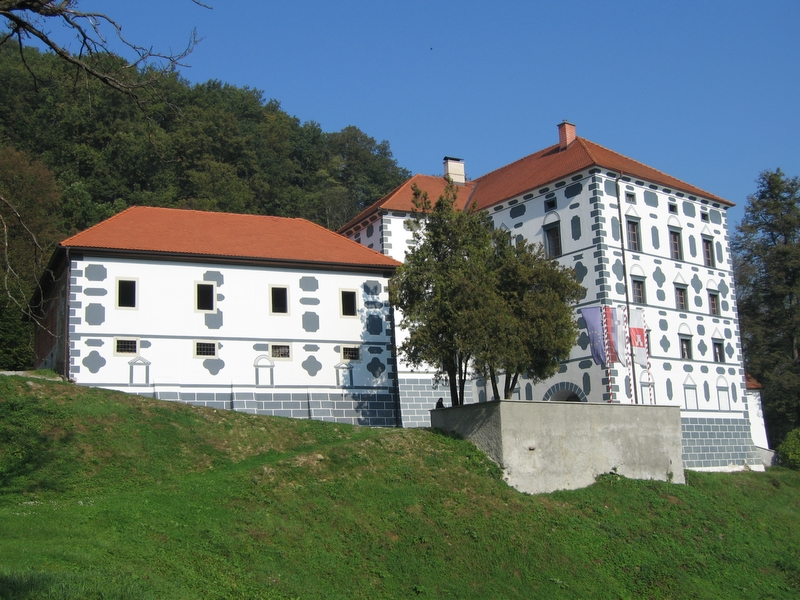
Strmol Mansion

Strmol Mansion (Slovene: Dvorec Strmol) is a 15th-century manorhouse located on a low hill above the old town center of Rogatec, Slovenia. It is notable as one of the few castles in Slovenia to have retained a Slovene name throughout its history.

The mansion was first mentioned in 1436 as a simple fortified tower in the possession of the counts of Celje, who gave it in fief to Jakob Strmol of Cerklje. The tower became the core of the later manorhouse, and is partially preserved within the later additions, beginning with a second tower and defenses added in the 16th century. At the end of the 16th century, the castle was purchased by the Auersperg family, from whom it later passed to the Frankopans.

In 1620 it was bought by Jurij Reising von Hartenstein; a chapel dedicated to St. Vincent Ferrer was first mentioned in 1682. The manor had largely lost its defensive role by the late 17th century, when its fortifications were demolished.

In 1730 it was inherited by Marija Izabela Petazzi (Slovene: Petač). In 1804 it was purchased by Baron Wintershofen, from whom it passed to the Windischgrätz family.

The small 16th-century two-story annex with inner courtyard served as an Austro-Hungarian district court during the 19th and the early 20th centuries; prison facilities are preserved in the basement. After World War II, the castle was converted into apartments.

In 2003, the mansion was thoroughly renovated and declared a cultural monument. It currently serves in both hospitality and museum capacities:

- Third floor: chapel, with restored Baroque murals; two large halls, available for banquets, conferences, or weddings
- Second floor: art gallery, featuring rotating exhibits
- First floor: divided into pub and restaurant
- Cellar: Vinoteka za prijatelje (Wine Cellar for Friends) tasting rooms, historic dungeon

The Rogatec Open-Air Museum is located nearby.
