= Tlake, Rogatec =

Tlake
- Location in Slovenia
- Coordinates: 46°14′57″N 15°43′00″E
- Country: Slovenia
- Traditional region: Styria
- Statistical region: Savinja
- Municipality: Rogatec

Area
  - Total: 4.69 km^{2} (1.81 sq mi)
- Elevation: 261.7 m (859 ft)

Population (2002)
  - Total: 301

Tlake (pronounced [ˈtlaːkɛ]) is a settlement in the Municipality of Rogatec in eastern Slovenia. The area is part of the traditional region of Styria. It is now included in the Savinja Statistical Region.

== Name ==
The name Tlake is derived from the Slovene common noun tlaka, originally referring to voluntary collective labor, and later to corvée under feudalism. It refers to a place where collective labor was performed. Because places with this name generally do not lie near old Roman roads, the suggestion that the name is derived from tlak 'pavement' is unlikely.

== Notable people ==
Notable people that were born or lived in Tlake include:

- Jože Šmit (1922–2004), poet and translator.
