= Branko Hofman =

Poet, writer and playwright (1929-1991)

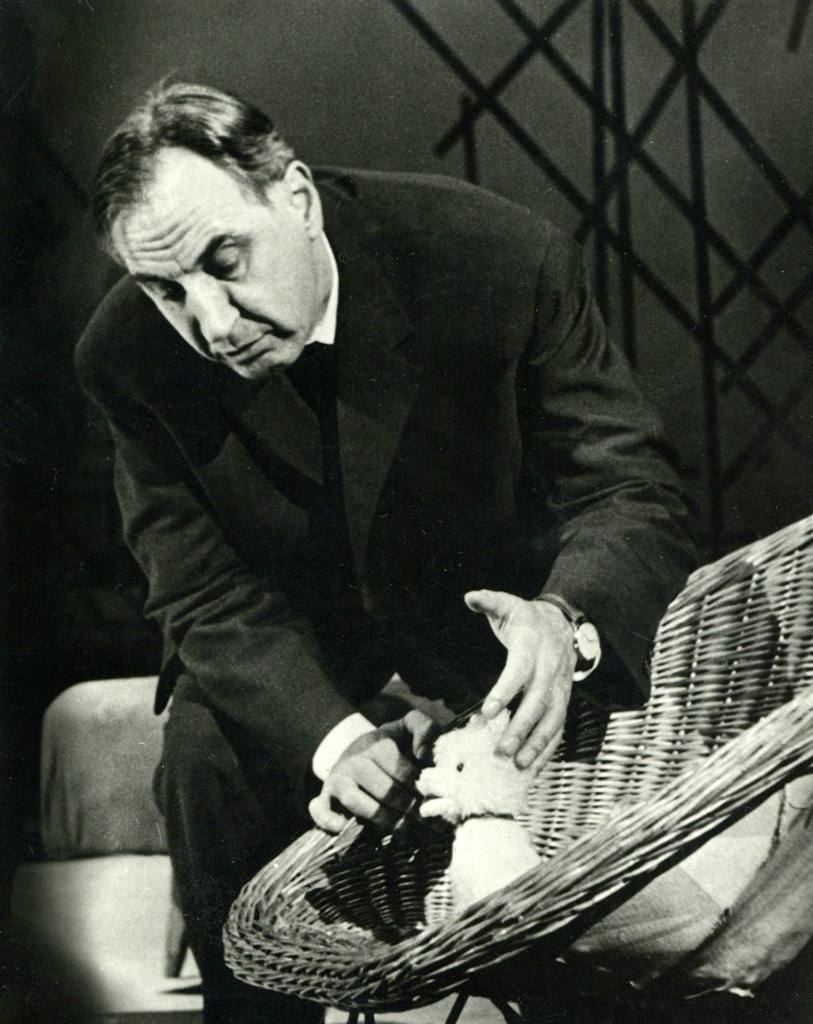
- Branko Hofman in 1962
- Born: 29 November 1929; Rogatec, Yugoslavia
- Died: 12 June 1991 (aged 61); Ljubljana, Slovenia
- Occupations: Poet, writer and playwright
- Writing career
- Notable works: Noč do jutra, Ringo Star
- Notable awards: Levstik Award; 1981 for Ringo Star

Branko Hofman (29 November 1929 – 12 June 1991) was a Slovene poet, writer and playwright. As well as his poetry he is best known for his 1981 novel Noč do jutra (Night Till Morning) that deals with the subject of the Goli Otok prison.

Hofman was born in Rogatec, then part of Yugoslavia, in 1929. He studied Comparative literature at the University of Ljubljana and worked as a journalist at Radio Koper and editor at Večer and the DZS Publishing House.

He won the Levstik Award in 1981 for his book Ringo Star.

== Published works ==
=== Poetry ===
- Pred jutrom (Before Morning), 1951
- Za oblaki so zvezde (There Are Stars Behind the Clouds), 1956
- Mavrica v dlaneh (The Rainbow in My Palm), 1962
- Trapez (Trapezoid), 1970
- In večno življenje mesa (And the Eternal Life of Meat), 1972
- Pesmi (Poems), 1972
- Lok (Arch), 1977
- Ne kliči, tu ni škržatov (Don't Call Out, There Are No Cicadas Here), 1989

=== Prose ===
- Vrabčki (Sparrows), 1955
- Strah (Fear), 1961
- Ljubezen (Love), 1965
- Ringo Star (Ringo Star), 1980
- Noč do jutra (Night Till Morning), 1981
- Tonka Paconka (Tonka Paconka), 1982
- Kdo mamici soli pamet (Who Is Being Clever With Mum), 1985
- Ringo potepuh (Ringo the Vagabond), 1990

=== Drama ===
- Življenje zmaguje (Life Wins), 1955
- Svetloba velike samote (The Light of Great Loneliness), 1957
- Zvezde na jutranjem nebu (Stars in the Morning Sky), 1958
- Dan in vsi dnevi (The Day and All Days), 1962
- Mož brez obraza (The Faceless Man), 1971
