= Artem Habelok =

Ukrainian footballer (born 1995)

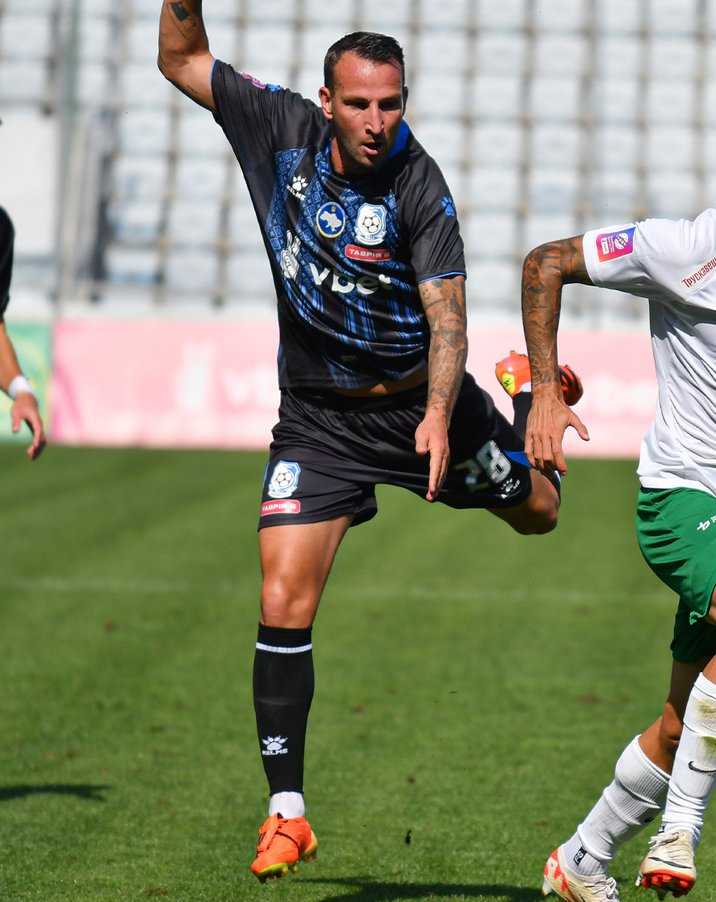

Personal information
- Full name: Artem Yuriyovych Habelok
- Date of birth: 2 January 1995 (age 31)
- Place of birth: Dnipropetrovsk, Ukraine
- Height: 1.77 m (5 ft 10 in)
- Position: Midfielder

Team information
- Current team: Nyva Ternopil
- Number: 28

Youth career
- 2009–2014: Shakhtar Donetsk

Senior career*
Years	Team	Apps	(Gls)
2013–2017	Shakhtar Donetsk	0	(0)
2014–2015	→ Shakhtar-3 Donetsk	16	(1)
2017	Spartaks Jūrmala	20	(2)
2018–2020	Vorskla Poltava	34	(2)
2020	Pyunik Yerevan	7	(0)
2021–2024	Metalist 1925 Kharkiv	83	(4)
2024–2026	Chornomorets Odesa	30	(1)
2026–	Nyva Ternopil	3	(0)

International career^{‡}
2011	Ukraine U16	1	(0)
2012	Ukraine U17	6	(3)
2013	Ukraine U18	7	(3)
2013–2014	Ukraine U19	6	(1)
2015–2016	Ukraine U20	6	(0)
- * Club domestic league appearances and goals as of 14 August 2026 ‡ National team caps and goals as of 22 March 2016

Artem Yuriyovych Habelok (Ukrainian: Артем Юрійович Габелок; born 2 January 1995) is a Ukrainian football player who plays as a midfileder.

== Club career ==
He was raised in the youth teams of Shakhtar Donetsk, representing their Under-19 squad in the 2013–14 UEFA Youth League.

He made his senior professional-level debut in the Ukrainian Second League for Shakhtar-3 on 25 July 2014 in a game against Arsenal Bila Tserkva, as a starter.

In February 2017, he moved to Latvia, signing with Spartaks Jūrmala. He was a starter for most of the season as Spartaks won the 2017 Latvian Higher League.

On 3 July 2018, he returned to Ukraine, signing a two-year contract with Vorskla Poltava. He made his Ukrainian Premier League debut for Vorskla on 25 July 2018 in a game against Dynamo Kyiv as an 82nd-minute substitute for Dmytro Kravchenko. His first start came on 11 August against his first club, Shakhtar. That season Vorskla also qualified for the Europa League group stage, with Habelok making his full European debut on 4 October 2018 against Sporting CP, as a late substitute (he previously played in the Champions League qualifiers with Spartaks). Vorskla allowed two goals in added time and lost 1–2.

30 January 2021 Habelok left FC Pyunik by mutual consent.

=== Chornomorets Odesa ===
On 2 August 2024, Habelok joined Ukrainian Premier League side Chornomorets Odesa, making his debut against Kryvbas Kryvyi Rih on 3 August 2024. He left the team on June 30, 2026.

On 11 July 2026, Habelok joined Nyva Ternopil.

== International ==
He represented Ukraine U20 at the 2015 FIFA U-20 World Cup and made three substitute appearances in the tournament. He was the only one to score for Ukraine in the Round of 16 penalty shoot-out against Senegal as Ukraine was eliminated and three other penalty takers had their shots saved.

== Honours ==
Chornomorets Odesa

- Ukrainian First League runner-up: 2025–26
