= Sveti Jurij =

Sveti Jurij, meaning 'Saint George', sometimes abbreviated to Sv. Jurij, may refer to a number of settlements in Slovenia:

- Municipality of Sveti Jurij v Slovenskih Goricah, municipality in Slovenia
- Sveti Jurij, Rogatec, a settlement in the Municipality of Rogatec
- Sveti Jurij, Grosuplje, a settlement in the Municipality of Grosuplje
- Sveti Jurij, Rogašovci, a settlement in the Municipality of Rogašovci
- Sveti Jurij ob Ščavnici, a settlement in the Municipality of Sveti Jurij ob Ščavnici
- Gore, Hrastnik, a settlement in the Municipality of Hrastnik, known as Sveti Jurij ob Turju until 1955
- Jurski Vrh, a settlement in the Municipality of Kungota, known as Sveti Jurij ob Pesnici until 1952
- Podkum, a settlement in the Municipality of Zagorje ob Savi, known as Sveti Jurij pod Kumom until 1952
- Šentjur na Polju, a settlement in the Municipality of Sevnica, known as Sveti Jurij pri Loki until 1955
