= Dobovec pri Rogatcu =

- Location in Slovenia
- Coordinates: 46°12′33.38″N 15°45′29.32″E
- Country: Slovenia
- Traditional region: Styria
- Statistical region: Savinja
- Municipality: Rogatec

Area
  - Total: 3.49 km^{2} (1.35 sq mi)
- Elevation: 252.5 m (828 ft)

Population (2002)
  - Total: 306

Dobovec pri Rogatcu (pronounced [ˈdoːbɔʋəts pɾi ɾɔˈɡaːtsu]) is a settlement east of the town of Rogatec in eastern Slovenia. The area is part of the traditional region of Styria. It is now included in the Savinja Statistical Region.

== Name ==
The name of the settlement was changed from Dobovec to Dobovec pri Rogatcu in 1953.

== Church ==
The local parish church, built on a small hill above the settlement, is dedicated to Saint Roch (Slovene: sveti Rok) and belongs to the Roman Catholic Diocese of Celje. It was originally built in the 17th century and rebuilt in the 18th century.
