= Municipality of Rogatec =

Municipality of Slovenia

Municipality of Rogatec Občina Rogatec
- Municipality
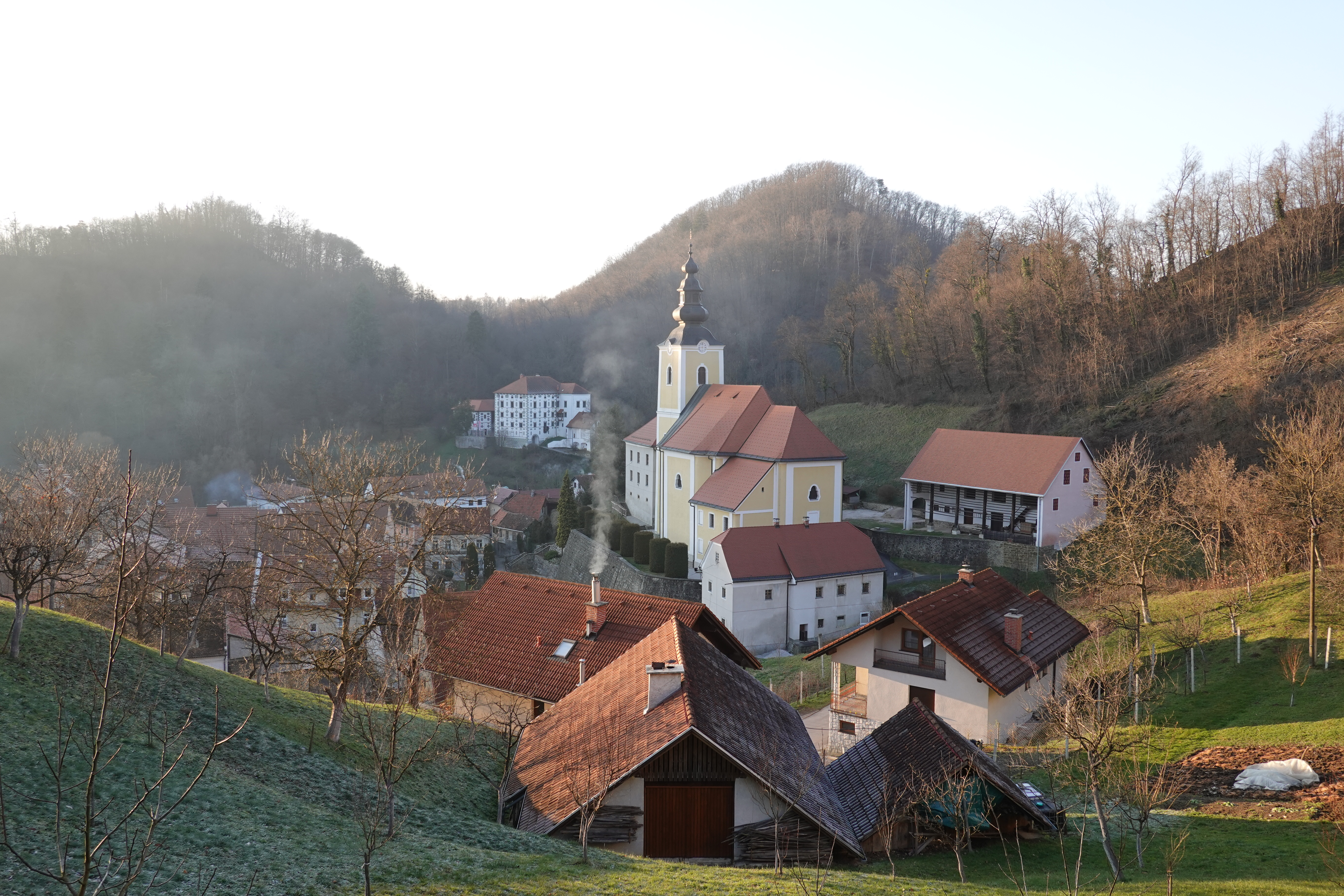

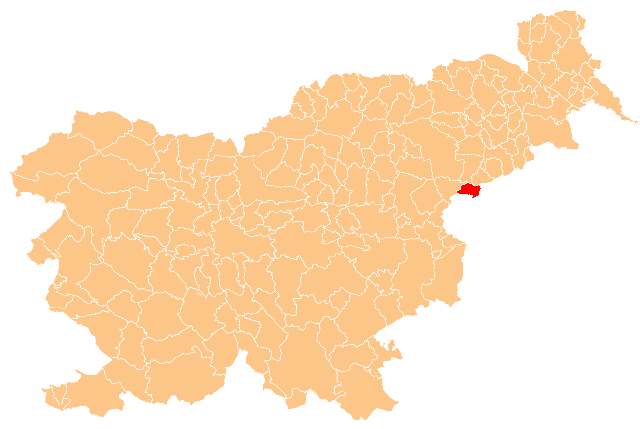
- Location of the Municipality of Rogatec in Slovenia
- Coordinates: 46°13′N 15°42′E
- Country: Slovenia

Government
  - Mayor: Martin Mikolič

Area
  - Total: 39.6 km^{2} (15.3 sq mi)

Population (2010)
  - Total: 3,162
  - Density: 79.8/km^{2} (207/sq mi)
- Time zone: UTC+01 (CET)
  - Summer (DST): UTC+02 (CEST)
- Website: www.rogatec.net

The Municipality of Rogatec (pronounced [ɾɔˈɡaːtəts]; Slovene: Občina Rogatec) is a municipality in eastern Slovenia, on the border with Croatia. The seat of the municipality is the town of Rogatec. The area belongs to the traditional region of Styria. It is now included in the Savinja Statistical Region. The municipality was established in its current form on 3 October 1994, when the former larger Municipality of Šmarje pri Jelšah was subdivided into the municipalities of Kozje, Podčetrtek, Rogaška Slatina, Rogatec, and Šmarje pri Jelšah.

== Settlements ==
In addition to the municipal seat of Rogatec, the municipality also includes the following settlements:

- Brezovec pri Rogatcu
- Dobovec pri Rogatcu
- Donačka Gora
- Log
- Sveti Jurij
- Tlake
- Trlično
- Žahenberc
