= Log, Rogatec =

Log
- Location in Slovenia
- Coordinates: 46°13′47.22″N 15°46′19.35″E
- Country: Slovenia
- Traditional region: Styria
- Statistical region: Savinja
- Municipality: Rogatec

Area
  - Total: 14.12 km^{2} (5.45 sq mi)
- Elevation: 513.2 m (1,684 ft)

Population (2002)
  - Total: 246

Log (pronounced [ˈloːk]) is a settlement in the Municipality of Rogatec in eastern Slovenia. It lies in the wooded hills above the right bank of the Sotla River, close to its source. Part of the surrounding area has been declared a forest reserve as a typical Subpannonian beech and oak forest preserved in its natural state. It is known as the Forest Reserve at Log on the Sotla River (Slovene: Gozdni rezervat Log ob Sotli). The entire Rogatec area is part of the traditional region of Styria. It is now included in the Savinja Statistical Region.
