= Artur (footballer, born 1994) =

Brazilian footballer

Personal information
- Full name: Artur Sérgio Batista de Souza
- Date of birth: 5 August 1994 (age 32)
- Place of birth: Rondon do Pará , Pará, Brazil
- Height: 1.78 m (5 ft 10 in)
- Position: Left-back

Team information
- Current team: Londrina
- Number: 22

Youth career
- 2012–2013: JV Lideral
- 2013–2014: Internacional

Senior career*
Years	Team	Apps	(Gls)
2015–2018	Internacional	57	(1)
2017	→ Ponte Preta (loan)	10	(0)
2018	→ Brasil de Pelotas (loan)	16	(0)
2018	→ Criciúma (loan)	1	(0)
2018–2020	Vorskla Poltava	40	(0)
2020	Keşla	9	(0)
2021	Brasil de Pelotas	13	(0)
2021–2022	Goiás	32	(0)
2022–2023	Ponte Preta	82	(0)
2024	Água Santa	7	(0)
2024	Mirassol	6	(0)
2025	Ponte Preta	34	(1)
2026	América Mineiro	12	(0)
2026–	Londrina	8	(0)
- * Club domestic league appearances and goals as of 18 November 2026

Artur Sérgio Batista de Souza (born 5 August 1994), known simply as Artur, is a Brazilian footballer who plays as a left-back for Londrina].

== Career ==
=== Internacional ===
Born in Abel Figueiredo, Pará, Artur began his career with Sport Club Internacional in Rio Grande do Sul. He had his first senior call-up on 16 October 2013, remaining an unused substitute in a goalless Campeonato Brasileiro Série A draw at Santos FC, and made eight more appearances on the bench that season.

On 5 June 2015, he made his professional debut, starting in a 1–1 draw at Sociedade Esportiva Palmeiras in the year's national championship; he totalled 13 appearances that season, 9 as a starter.

Artur scored his first goal on 11 February 2016, to win a home match 2–1 against Esporte Clube Passo Fundo in that year's Campeonato Gaúcho.

=== Keşla FK ===
On 16 August 2020, Artur signed a contract with Keşla FK until the end of the 2020–21 season.

On 30 November 2020, Keşla announced the departure of Artur by mutual consent.

== Career statistics ==
As of match played 9 February 2025

Appearances and goals by club, season and competition
Club	Season	League			State league		National cup (Note: Includes Copa do Brasil, Ukrainian Cup, Azerbaijan Cup)		Continental		Other		Total	
Club	Season	Division	Apps	Goals	Apps	Goals	Apps	Goals	Apps	Goals	Apps	Goals	Apps	Goals
Internacional	2013	Série A	0	0	0	0	0	0	—		—		0	0
Internacional	2014	Série A	0	0	0	0	0	0	—		—		0	0
Internacional	2015	Série A	13	0	0	0	1	0	0	0	—		14	0
Internacional	2016	Série A	20	0	17 (Note: Appearance(s) in Campeonato Gaúcho)	1	2	0	—		4 (Note: Appearance(s) in Primeira Liga)	0	43	1
Internacional	2017	Série B	0	0	0	0	0	0	—		0	0	0	0
Internacional	2018	Série A	0	0	0	0	0	0	—		—		0	0
Internacional	Total		33	0	17	1	3	0	0	0	4	0	57	1
Ponte Preta (loan)	2017	Série A	1	0	9 (Note: Appearance(s) in Campeonato Paulista Série A1)	0	0	0	1 (Note: Appearance(s) in Copa Sudamericana)	0	—		11	0
Brasil de Pelotas (loan)	2018	Série B	5	0	11	0	—		—		—		16	0
Criciúma (loan)	2018	Série B	1	0	0	0	—		—		—		1	0
Vorskla Poltava	2018-19	Ukrainian Premier League	20	0	—		0	0	5 (Note: Appearance(s) in UEFA Europa League)	0	—		25	0
Vorskla Poltava	2019-20	Ukrainian Premier League	14	0	—		1	0	—		—		15	0
Vorskla Poltava	Total		34	0	—		1	0	5	0	0	0	40	0
Keşla	2020-21	Azerbaijan Premier League	9	0	—		0	0	1	0	—		10	0
Brasil de Pelotas	2021	Série B	6	0	7	0	—		—		—		13	0
Goiás	2021	Série B	20	0	0	0	0	0	—		—		20	0
Goiás	2022	Série A	0	0	10 (Note: Appearance(s) in Campeonato Goiano)	0	2	0	—		—		12	0
Goiás	Total		20	0	10	0	2	0	0	0	0	0	32	0
Ponte Preta	2022	Série B	32	0	0	0	0	0	—		—		32	0
Ponte Preta	2023	Série B	34	0	16 (Note: Appearance(s) in Campeonato Paulista Série A2)	0	2	0	—		—		52	0
Ponte Preta	Total		66	0	16	0	2	0	0	0	0	0	84	0
Água Santa	2024	Série D	0	0	5	0	2	0	—		—		7	0
Mirassol	2024	Série B	6	0	0	0	—		—		—		6	0
Água Santa	2024	Série D	7	0	0	0	0	0	—		—		7	0
Ponte Preta	2025	Série C	0	0	7	0	0	0	—		—		7	0
Career total			188	0	82	1	10	0	7	0	4	0	291	1
