= Taras Sakiv =

Ukrainian footballer

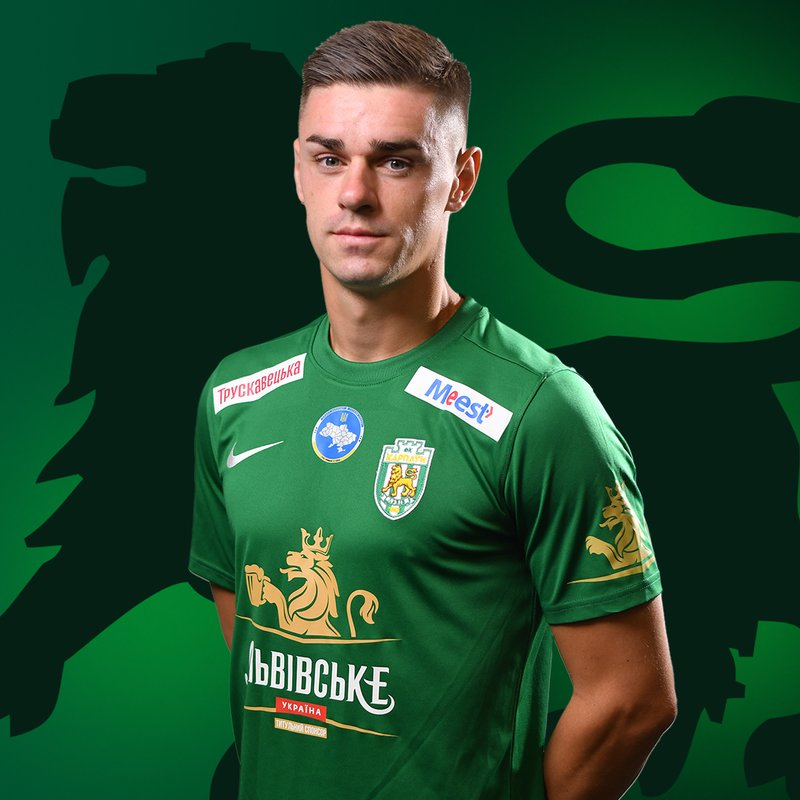

Personal information
- Full name: Taras Stepanovych Sakiv
- Date of birth: 19 November 1997 (age 28)
- Place of birth: Luchyntsi, Rohatyn Raion, Ivano-Frankivsk Oblast, Ukraine
- Height: 1.79 m (5 ft 10 in)
- Position: Defender

Team information
- Current team: Bukovyna Chernivtsi
- Number: 4

Youth career
- 2010–2011: Enerhetyk Burshtyn
- 2012: Shakhtar Donetsk
- 2012–2013: Illichivets Mariupol
- 2013–2014: Dynamo Kyiv

Senior career*
| Years | Team | Apps | (Gls) |
| 2014 | Enerhetyk Burshtyn | 4 | (1) |
| 2015–2019 | Vorskla Poltava | 22 | (0) |
| 2020 | Rukh Lviv | 7 | (0) |
| 2020–2021 | Mynai | 19 | (0) |
| 2021 | Kolos Kovalivka | 6 | (0) |
| 2022–2023 | Inhulets Petrove | 12 | (0) |
| 2023–2025 | Karpaty Lviv | 33 | (1) |
| 2025– | Bukovyna Chernivtsi | 15 | (1) |
- * Club domestic league appearances and goals as of 3 June 2026

Taras Stepanovych Sakiv (Ukrainian: Тарас Степанович Саків; born 19 November 1997) is a Ukrainian professional footballer who plays as a defender who plays for Bukovyna Chernivtsi.

== Career ==
Sakiv is a product of the different youth sportive schools. In 2014, he played in the Ukrainian amateur competition for the club FC Enerhetyk Burshtyn. From winter 2015 he continued his career in the Ukrainian Premier League Reserves club FC Vorskla Poltava.

In March 2017 Sakiv was promoted to the main-squad team of FC Vorskla in the Ukrainian Premier League. He made his debut as a substituted player for Vorskla Poltava in the Ukrainian Premier League in a match against FC Volyn Lutsk on 1 April 2017.

In January 2023 he moved to Karpaty Lviv.
