= Nicolas Careca =

Brazilian footballer (born 1997)

Personal information
- Full name: Nicolas Morês da Cruz
- Date of birth: 18 May 1997 (age 29)
- Place of birth: Brasília, Brazil
- Height: 1.88 m (6 ft 2 in)
- Position: Forward

Team information
- Current team: Novorizontino
- Number: 30

Youth career
- 2010: Atlético Mineiro
- 2011–2014: Grêmio

Senior career*
Years	Team	Apps	(Gls)
2014–2019	Grêmio	3	(0)
2017	→ Figueirense (loan)	5	(1)
2018	→ Oeste (loan)	20	(1)
2018–2019	→ Vorskla Poltava (loan)	30	(2)
2019–2021	Estoril	15	(3)
2021–2023	CRB	26	(3)
2022	→ Guarani (loan)	28	(2)
2023	Paysandu	14	(2)
2024	Anyang	9	(0)
2025–	Coritiba	15	(1)
2026–	Novorizontino	26	(3)
- * Club domestic league appearances and goals as of 17 November 2026

Nicolas Morês da Cruz (born 18 May 1997) commonly known as Nicolas Careca, is a Brazilian professional footballer who plays as a forward for Série B club Novorizontino.

== Career ==
=== Grêmio ===
Nicolas made his league debut for Grêmio against Coritiba on 25 October 2014.

=== Figueirense ===
Nicolas scored on his league debut for Figueirense against América Mineiro on 21 July 2017, scoring in the 58th minute.

=== Oeste ===
Nicolas made his league debut for Oeste against Rio Claro on 20 January 2018. He scored his first goal for the club against XV de Piracicaba on 24 January 2018, scoring in the 66th minute.

=== Vorskla ===
Nicolas scored on his debut for Vorskla against Lviv on 4 August 2018, scoring in the 83rd minute.

=== Estoril ===
Nicolas made his league debut for Estoril against Porto II on 14 September 2019. He scored his first goal for the club against Mafra on 8 December 2019, scoring in the 88th minute.

=== CRB ===
Nicolas made his league debut for CRB against Avaí on 25 June 2021. He scored his first goal for the club against Botafogo on 7 July 2021, scoring in the 46th minute.

=== Guarani SP ===
Nicolas made his league debut for Guarani SP against Palmeiras on 6 March 2022. He scored his first goal for the club against Sport Recife on 29 July 2022, scoring in the 90th+1st minute.

=== Paysandu ===
Nicolas made his league debut for Paysandu against Floresta on 18 June 2023. He scored his first goal for the club against Amazonas on 8 July 2023, scoring in the 17th minute.

== Career statistics ==
As of 7 October 2023

Appearances and goals by club, season and competition
Club	Season	League			State League		National Cup		Continental		Other		Total	
Club	Season	Division	Apps	Goals	Apps	Goals	Apps	Goals	Apps	Goals	Apps	Goals	Apps	Goals
Grêmio	2014	Série A	1	0	—		—		—		—		1	0
Grêmio	2017	Série A	2	0	—		0	0	0	0	—		1	0
Grêmio	Total		3	0	—		0	0	0	0	—		3	0
Figueirense (loan)	2017	Série B	5	1	—		—		—		—		5	1
Oeste (loan)	2018	Série B	6	0	12	1	2	0	—		—		20	1
Vorskla Poltava (loan)	2018–19	Ukrainian Premier League	24	2	—		2	1	5	0	—		31	3
Estoril	2019–20	LigaPro	15	2	—		2	1	—		—		17	3
CRB	2021	Série B	23	2	—		2	1	—		3	1	28	4
CRB	2022	Série B	—		0	0	—		—		—		0	0
CRB	Total		23	2	0	0	2	1	—		3	1	28	4
Guarani (loan)	2022	Série B	15	1	4	0	2	0	—		—		21	1
Guarani (loan)	2023	Série B	0	0	9	1	—		—		—		9	1
Guarani (loan)	Total		15	1	13	1	2	0	—		—		30	2
Paysandu	2023	Série C	14	2	—		—		—		—		14	2
Career total			105	10	25	2	10	3	5	0	3	1	148	16

== Honours ==
CRB

- Campeonato Alagoano: 2022

Novorizontino

- Campeonato Brasileiro Série B: 2026
