= Ponikva, Šentjur =

Ponikva
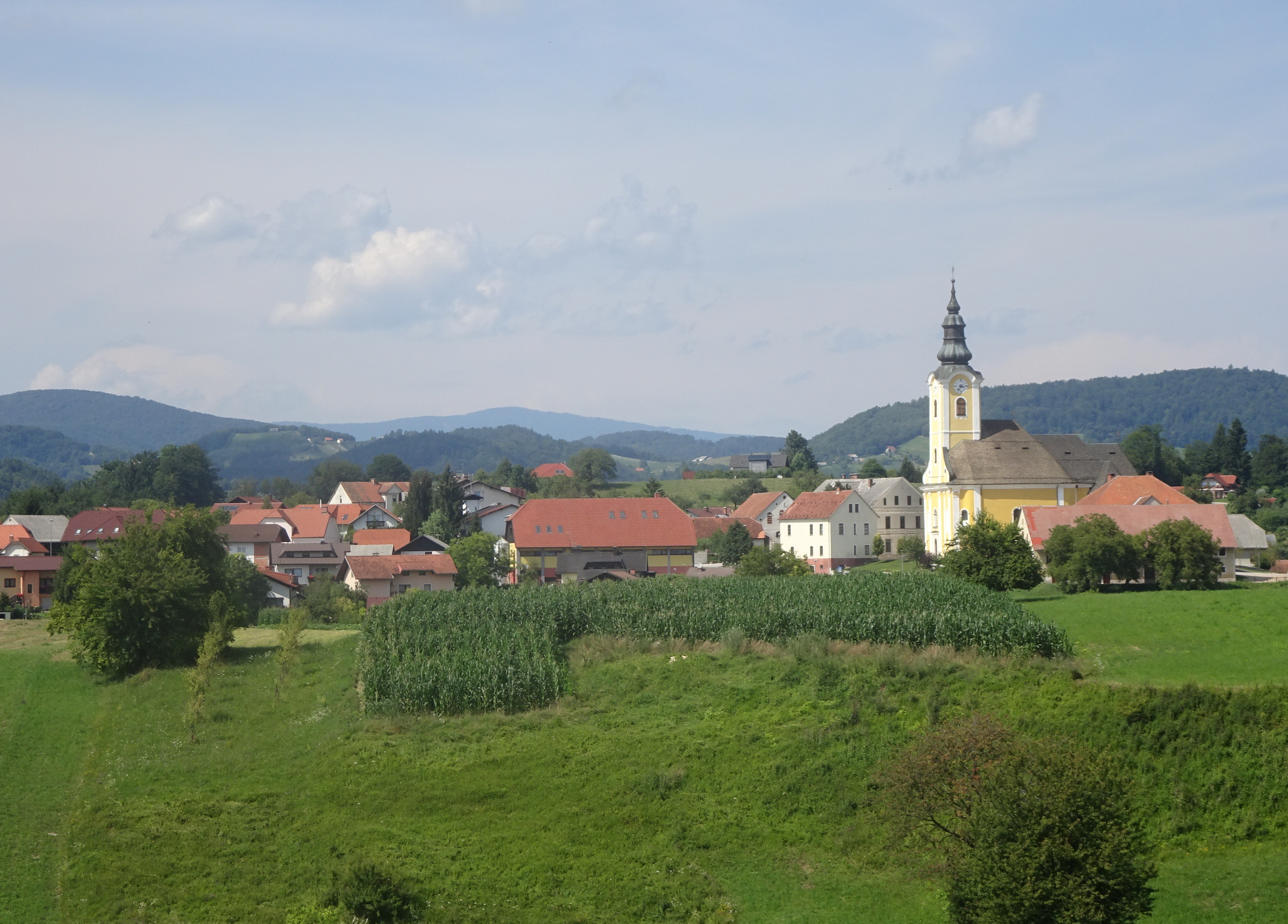

- Location in Slovenia
- Coordinates: 46°15′27.07″N 15°26′52.89″E
- Country: Slovenia
- Traditional region: Styria
- Statistical region: Savinja
- Municipality: Šentjur

Area
  - Total: 1.94 km^{2} (0.75 sq mi)
- Elevation: 338 m (1,109 ft)

Population (2020)
  - Total: 465
  - Density: 240/km^{2} (621/sq mi)

Ponikva (pronounced [ˈpoːnikʋa]) is one of the most populous settlements in the Municipality of Šentjur, eastern Slovenia. The settlement, and the entire municipality, are included in the Savinja Statistical Region, which is in the Slovenian portion of the historical Duchy of Styria.

== Church ==
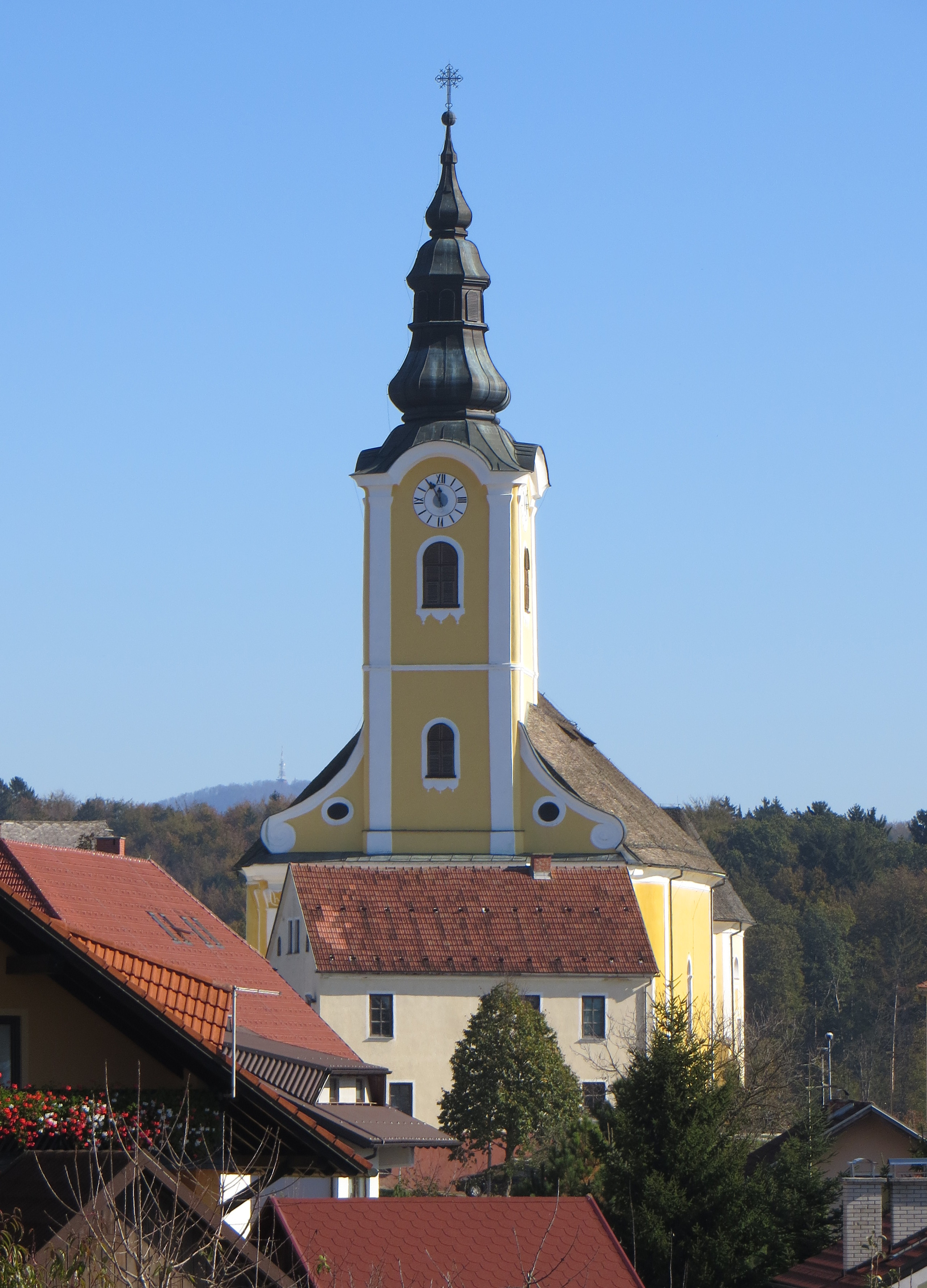
Saint Martin's Church

The local parish church, built on the southeastern edge of the settlement, is dedicated to Saint Martin and belongs to the Roman Catholic Diocese of Celje. It was built between 1732 and 1737.
