= Dmytro Kravchenko =

Ukrainian footballer

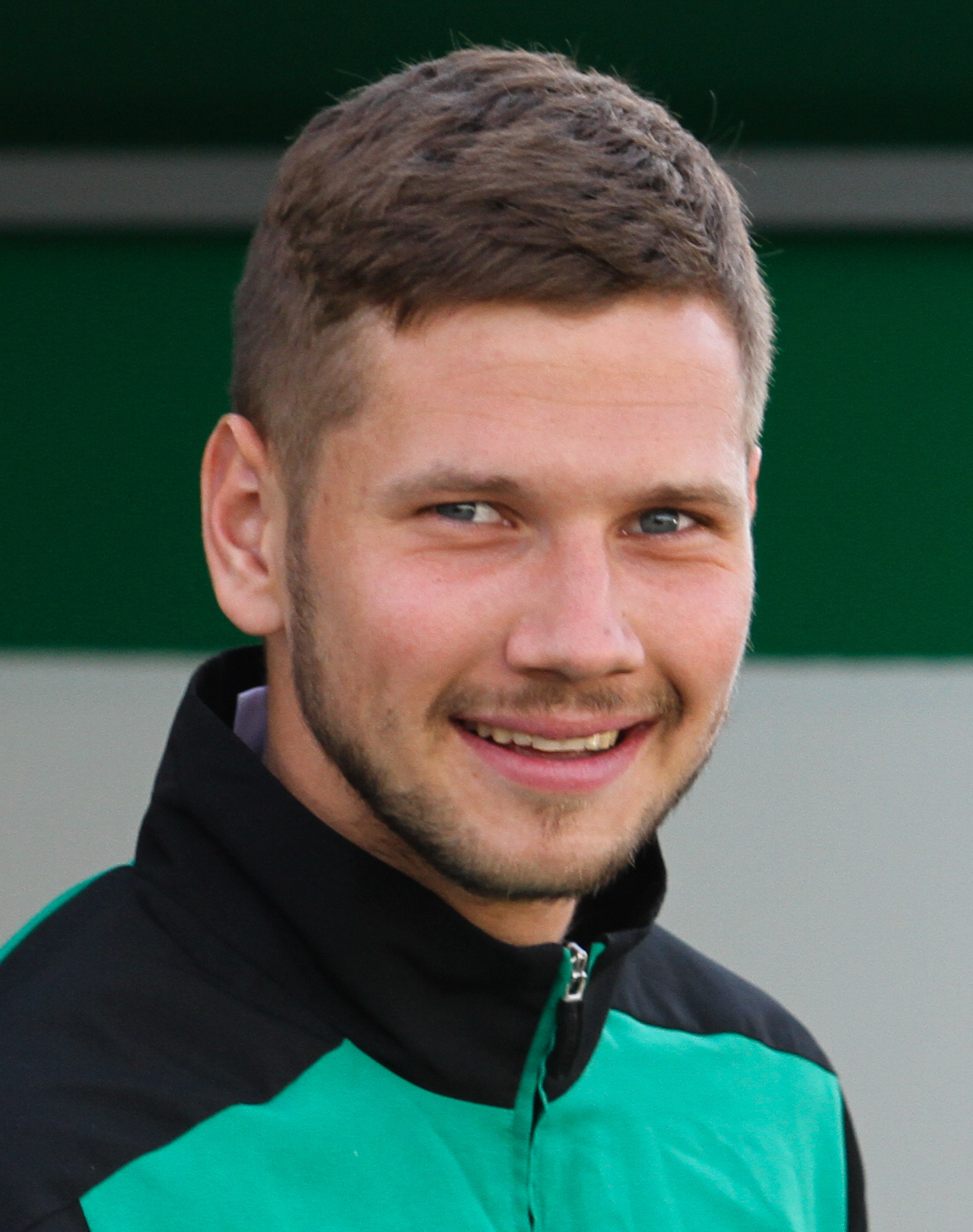

Personal information
- Full name: Dmytro Andriyovych Kravchenko
- Date of birth: 25 February 1995 (age 31)
- Place of birth: Poltava, Ukraine
- Height: 1.77 m (5 ft 10 in)
- Position: Midfielder

Team information
- Current team: Metalist 1925 Kharkiv
- Number: 27

Youth career
- 2001–2012: Vorskla Poltava

Senior career*
Years	Team	Apps	(Gls)
2012–2019	Vorskla Poltava	52	(1)
2020–	Metalist 1925 Kharkiv	42	(2)

International career^{‡}
2013	Ukraine U18	3	(0)
2013	Ukraine U19	4	(0)
2015	Ukraine U20	1	(0)
- * Club domestic league appearances and goals as of 19 August 2023 ‡ National team caps and goals as of 28 February 2020

Dmytro Andriyovych Kravchenko (Ukrainian: Дмитро Андрійович Кравченко; born 25 February 1995) is a Ukrainian professional footballer who plays as a midfielder for Metalist 1925 Kharkiv.

== Career ==
Kravchenko is a product of his native FC Vorskla School System. His first trainer was Volodymyr Plyevako.

He made his debut for FC Vorskla in a game against FC Stal Kamianske on 21 August 2016 in the Ukrainian Premier League.

== International career ==
He also played for Ukrainian different youth national football teams.
