= Ardin Dallku =

Kosovan footballer (born 1994)

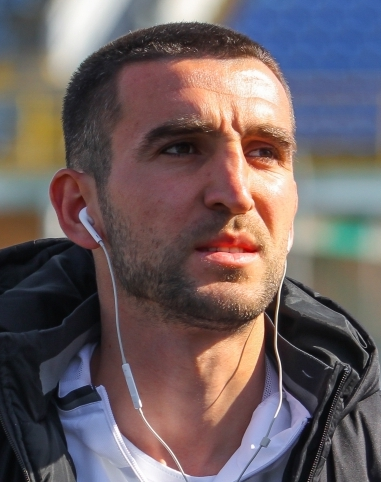
- Dallku with Vorskla Poltava in March 2017

Personal information
- Date of birth: 1 November 1994 (age 32)
- Place of birth: Vushtrri, FR Yugoslavia
- Height: 1.84 m (6 ft 0 in)
- Position: Centre-back

Team information
- Current team: Dukagjini
- Number: 44

Youth career
- –2012: Prishtina
- 2012–2016: Vorskla Poltava

Senior career*
| Years | Team | Apps | (Gls) |
| 2016–2019 | Vorskla Poltava | 59 | (2) |
| 2020 | Shkëndija | 2 | (0) |
| 2021 | Gjilani | 7 | (0) |
| 2021–2024 | Dukagjini | 100 | (5) |
| 2024– | Vushtrria | 0 | (0) |

International career^{‡}
| 2017–2018 | Kosovo | 2 | (0) |
- * Club domestic league appearances and goals as of 15 June 2024 ‡ National team caps and goals as of 14 October 2018

Ardin Dallku (born 1 November 1994) is a Kosovan professional footballer who plays as a centre-back for Kosovan club Vushtrria.

== Club career ==
=== Vorskla Poltava ===
On 10 January 2012, Dallku signed to Ukrainian club Vorskla Poltava. On 1 July 2016, he promoted to the first team and on 10 December 2016, he made his debut in a 0–1 away win against Volyn Lutsk after being named in the starting line-up.

=== Shkëndija ===
On 24 October 2019, Dallku signed a precontract with Macedonian First Football League club Shkëndija and this transfer would become legally effective in January 2020. On 1 March 2020, he made his debut in a 4–1 home win against Makedonija Gjorče Petrov after being named in the starting line-up.

== International career ==
On 28 August 2017, Dallku received a call-up from Kosovo for the 2018 FIFA World Cup qualification matches against Croatia and Finland. On 13 November 2017, he making his debut with Kosovo in friendly match against Latvia after being named in the starting line-up.

== Personal life ==
Dallku was born in Vushtrri, Kosovo and is the son of former Yugoslavia international Sabit Dallku and is the younger brother of former Albania international Armend Dallku. He holds Kosovan, Albanian, and Serbian passports.

== Career statistics ==
=== Club ===
As of 8 March 2020

| Club | Season | League | | | Cup | | Continental | | Other | | Total | |
| Club | Season | Division | Apps | Goals | Apps | Goals | Apps | Goals | Apps | Goals | Apps | Goals |
|---|---|---|---|---|---|---|---|---|---|---|---|---|
| Vorskla Poltava | 2016–17 | Ukrainian Premier League | 12 | 0 | 0 | 0 | — | | | | 12 | 0 |
| Vorskla Poltava | 2017–18 | Ukrainian Premier League | 21 | 1 | 3 | 0 | — | | 9 (Note: All appearance(s) in Ukrainian Premier League's championship round) | 0 | 33 | 1 |
| Vorskla Poltava | 2018–19 | Ukrainian Premier League | 15 | 1 | 1 | 0 | 5 (Note: All appearance(s) in UEFA Europa League) | 0 | 3 (Note: All appearance(s) in Ukrainian Premier League's relegation round) | 0 | 24 | 1 |
| Vorskla Poltava | Total | | 48 | 2 | 4 | 0 | 5 | 0 | 12 | 0 | 69 | 2 |
| Shkëndija | 2019–20 | Macedonian First Football League | 2 | 0 | 0 | 0 | — | | | | 2 | 0 |
| Shkëndija | 2020–21 | Macedonian First Football League | 0 | 0 | 0 | 0 | — | | | | 0 | 0 |
| Shkëndija | Total | | 2 | 0 | 0 | 0 | — | | | | 2 | 0 |
| Gjilani | 2020–21 | Football Superleague of Kosovo | 0 | 0 | 0 | 0 | — | | | | 0 | 0 |
| Gjilani | Total | | 0 | 0 | 0 | 0 | — | | | | 0 | 0 |
| Career total | | | 50 | 2 | 4 | 0 | 5 | 0 | 12 | 0 | 71 | 2 |

=== International ===
As of 14 October 2018

| National team | Year | Apps | Goals |
|---|---|---|---|
Kosovo
| Kosovo | 2017 | 1 | 0 |
| Kosovo | 2018 | 1 | 0 |
| Total | | 2 | 0 |
