= 2019 FC Dinamo Tbilisi season =

FC Dinamo Tbilisi
2019 season
- Chairman: Roman Pipia
- Manager: Félix Vicente
- Stadium: Boris Paichadze Dinamo Arena
- Erovnuli Liga: Winners
- Georgian Cup: Fourth Round vs Merani Tbilisi
- UEFA Europa League: Third qualifying round vs Feyenoord
- Top goalscorer: League: Levan Kutalia (20); All: Levan Kutalia (22)
- Highest home attendance: 8,153 vs Gabala (1 August 2019)
- Lowest home attendance: 0 vs Feyenoord (15 August 2019)
- Average home league attendance: 1,478 (1 December 2019)

The 2019 FC Dinamo Tbilisi season was the thirty-first successive season that FC Dinamo Tbilisi played in the top flight of Georgian football.

== Season events ==
On 22 December, Dinamo Tbilisi announced the signing of Nodar Iashvili to an 18-month contract from Saburtalo Tbilisi.

On 25 December, Dinamo Tbilisi announced the signing of Levan Kutalia to a one-year contract from Torpedo Kutaisi.

On 10 January, Dinamo Tbilisi announced that Levan Kharabadze had left the club to join Zürich on an 18-month loan deal.

On 11 January, Dinamo Tbilisi announced the signing of Fran Carbià to a one-year contract from Reus Deportiu.

On 19 January, Dinamo Tbilisi announced the signing of José Perales to a one-year contract from Badalona.

On 21 January, Dinamo Tbilisi announced that Lasha Totadze had left the club to join Nassaji Mazandaran.

On 23 January, Dinamo Tbilisi announced the return of Giorgi Papava on a one-year contract from Rustavi, the signing of Antonio Rojano from Burgos also to a one-year contract, and the year-long loan signing of Abdeljalil Medioub from Recreativo Granada.

On 29 January, Dinamo Tbilisi announced the signing of Víctor Mongil to a one-year contract from Atlético Levante.

On 7 February, Dinamo Tbilisi announced the signing of Sergio Noche Márquez to a one-year contract from Somozas.

On 9 June, Dinamo Tbilisi announced that Antonio Rojano had left the club by mutual agreement.

On 19 June, Dinamo Tbilisi announced the signing of Arfang Daffé from Nassaji Mazandaran and Oleksandr Kapliyenko from Metalurh Zaporizhzhia, both on contract until the end of 2020.

On 28 June, Dinamo Tbilisi announced that Dmytro Ivanisenya had played his last match for the club and that he would be leaving the club when his contract expired at the end of June.

On 2 July, Dinamo Tbilisi announced the return of Serhiy Litovchenko from Chornomorets Odesa, on a contract until the end of 2020.

On 6 July, Dinamo Tbilisi announced the signing of Mykhaylo Shyshka from Obolon Kyiv and Mate Kvirkvia from Dinamo Batumi, both on six-month long contracts with the option of another year.

On 15 July, Dinamo Tbilisi announced the signing of Kwame Karikari from Neftçi to a one-year contract with the option of another year.

On 2 September, Dinamo Tbilisi announced that Levan Shengelia had left the club after his contract had expired at the end of August, and that Abdeljalil Medioub had also left the club in order to sign permantally for Girondins de Bordeaux.

On 19 September, Dinamo Tbilisi announced the signing of Levan Mchedlidze from Empoli to a one-year contract with the option of another year.

On 23 December, Dinamo Tbilisi announced that Kakhaber Chkhetiani had been appointed as the clubs new Head Coach.

== Squad ==
As of match played 1 December 2019

No.	Name	Nationality	Position	Date of birth (age)	Signed from	Signed in	Contract ends	Apps.	Goals
Goalkeepers
1	José Perales	(Spain)	GK	25 May 1993 (aged 26)	Badalona	2019	2019	42	0
12	Serhiy Litovchenko	(Ukraine)	GK	4 October 1987 (aged 32)	Chornomorets Odesa	2019	2020	29	0
25	Luka Kutaladze	(Georgia (country))	GK	27 April 2001 (aged 18)	Academy	2019		0	0
Defenders
2	Guja Rukhaia	(Russia)	DF	22 July 1987 (aged 32)	Sibir Novosibirsk	2018		66	2
3	Víctor Mongil	(Spain)	DF	21 July 1992 (aged 27)	Atlético Levante	2019	2019	43	1
5	Davit Kobouri	(Georgia (country))	DF	24 January 1998 (aged 21)	Academy	2015		88	2
16	Giorgi Kimadze	(Georgia (country))	DF	11 February 1992 (aged 27)	Torpedo Kutaisi	2019		15	0
23	Irakli Azarovi	(Georgia (country))	DF	21 February 2002 (aged 17)	Academy	2019		8	0
24	Nodar Iashvili	(Georgia (country))	DF	24 January 1993 (aged 26)	Saburtalo	2019	2020	38	0
29	Oleksandr Kapliyenko	(Ukraine)	DF	7 March 1996 (aged 23)	Metalurh Zaporizhzhia	2019	2020	14	0
37	Tornike Jangidze	(Georgia (country))	DF	8 January 2001 (aged 18)	Academy	2019		0	0
Midfielders
6	Bakar Kardava	(Georgia (country))	MF	4 October 1994 (aged 25)	Tskhinvali	2017		82	3
7	Giorgi Zaria	(Georgia (country))	MF	14 July 1997 (aged 22)	Dinamo Batumi	2015		70	6
8	Giorgi Kukhianidze	(Georgia (country))	MF	1 July 1992 (aged 27)	Torpedo Kutaisi	2019		29	3
11	Akaki Shulaia	(Georgia (country))	MF	6 September 1996 (aged 23)	Merani Martvili	2017		88	16
14	Arfang Daffé	(Senegal)	MF	24 June 1991 (aged 28)	Nassaji Mazandaran	2019	2020	17	2
15	Giorgi Papava	(Georgia (country))	MF	16 February 1993 (aged 26)	Rustavi	2019	2019	106	2
20	Beka Dartsmelia	(Georgia (country))	MF	21 March 2000 (aged 19)	Academy	2017		3	0
32	Nika Ninua	(Georgia (country))	MF	22 June 1999 (aged 20)	Academy	2016		92	14
34	Giorgi Moistsrapishvili	(Georgia (country))	MF	29 September 2001 (aged 18)	Academy	2019		0	0
35	Mykhaylo Shyshka	(Ukraine)	MF	5 July 1994 (aged 25)	Obolon Kyiv	2019	2019 (+1)	9	1
36	Mate Kvirkvia	(Georgia (country))	MF	14 June 1996 (aged 23)	Dinamo Batumi	2019	2019 (+1)	1	0
38	Nodar Kavtaradze	(Russia)	MF	2 January 1993 (aged 26)	Torpedo Kutaisi	2019		19	6
27	Anzor Mekvabishvili	(Georgia (country))	MF	5 June 2001 (aged 18)	Academy	2019		0	0
Forwards
9	Kwame Karikari	(Ghana)	FW	20 January 1992 (aged 27)	Neftçi	2019	2020	11	3
10	Levan Mchedlidze	(Georgia (country))	FW	24 March 1990 (aged 29)	Empoli	2019	2020	5	1
19	Levan Kutalia	(Georgia (country))	FW	19 July 1989 (aged 30)	Torpedo Kutaisi	2019	2019	39	22
26	Giorgi Abuashvili	(Georgia (country))	FW	8 February 2003 (aged 16)	Academy	2019		2	0
28	Fran Carbià	(Spain)	FW	31 March 1992 (aged 27)	Reus Deportiu	2019	2019	12	2
Players away on loan
17	Mikheil Ergemlidze	(Georgia (country))	FW	28 September 1999 (aged 20)	Academy	2017		29	1
21	Tornike Dzotsenidze	(Georgia (country))	DF	7 November 1999 (aged 20)	Academy	2018		4	0
31	Piruz Gabitashvili	(Georgia (country))	DF	14 June 2000 (aged 19)	Academy	2019		0	0
	Giorgi Mamardashvili	(Georgia (country))	GK	29 September 2000 (aged 19)	Academy	2018		0	0
	Levan Kharabadze	(Georgia (country))	DF	26 January 2000 (aged 19)	Academy	2018		37	4
	Tamaz Babunadze	(Georgia (country))	MF	4 January 2000 (aged 19)	Academy	2018		8	0
	Giorgi Kutsia	(Georgia (country))	MF	27 October 1999 (aged 20)	Academy	2017		47	3
Left during the season
4	Abdeljalil Medioub	(France)	DF	28 August 1997 (aged 22)	on loan from Recreativo Granada	2019	2019	22	2
9	Antonio Rojano	(Argentina)	FW	27 April 1991 (aged 28)	Burgos	2019	2019	10	0
18	Dmytro Ivanisenya	(Ukraine)	MF	11 January 1994 (aged 25)	Illichivets Mariupol	2018		56	7
22	Sergio Noche Márquez	(Spain)	DF	22 December 1992 (aged 26)	Somozas	2019	2019	4	0
27	Levan Shengelia	(Georgia (country))	FW	27 October 1995 (aged 24)	Tubize-Braine	2018		50	25
33	Ștefan Sicaci	(Moldova)	GK	8 September 1988 (aged 31)	Afips Afipsky	2018		21	0

== Transfers ==
=== In ===
Date	Position	Nationality	Name	From	Fee	Ref.
22 December 2018	DF	(Georgia (country))	Nodar Iashvili	Saburtalo Tbilisi	Undisclosed	
25 December 2018	FW	(Georgia (country))	Levan Kutalia	Torpedo Kutaisi	Undisclosed	
11 January 2019	FW	(Spain)	Fran Carbià	Reus Deportiu	Undisclosed	
19 January 2019	GK	(Spain)	José Perales	Badalona	Undisclosed	
23 January 2019	MF	(Georgia (country))	Giorgi Papava	Rustavi	Undisclosed	
23 January 2019	FW	(Argentina)	Antonio Rojano	Burgos	Undisclosed	
29 January 2019	DF	(Spain)	Víctor Mongil	Atlético Levante	Undisclosed	
7 February 2019	DF	(Spain)	Sergio Noche Márquez	Somozas	Undisclosed	
19 June 2019	MF	(Senegal)	Arfang Daffé	Nassaji Mazandaran	Undisclosed	
19 June 2019	DF	(Ukraine)	Oleksandr Kapliyenko	Metalurh Zaporizhzhia	Undisclosed	
2 July 2019	GK	(Ukraine)	Serhiy Litovchenko	Chornomorets Odesa	Undisclosed	
6 July 2019	MF	(Ukraine)	Mykhaylo Shyshka	Obolon Kyiv	Undisclosed	
6 July 2019	MF	(Georgia (country))	Mate Kvirkvia	Dinamo Batumi	Undisclosed	
15 July 2019	FW	(Ghana)	Kwame Karikari	Neftçi	Undisclosed	
19 July 2019	FW	(Georgia (country))	Levan Mchedlidze	Empoli	Undisclosed	

=== Loans in ===
Date from	Position	Nationality	Name	From	Date to	Ref.
23 January 2019	DF	(France)	Abdeljalil Medioub	Recreativo Granada	31 August 2019	

=== Out ===
Date	Position	Nationality	Name	To	Fee	Ref.
21 January 2019	DF	(Georgia (country))	Lasha Totadze	Nassaji Mazandaran	Undisclosed	

=== Loans out ===
Date from	Position	Nationality	Name	To	Date to	Ref.
10 January 2019	DF	(Georgia (country))	Levan Kharabadze	Zürich	30 June 2020	

=== Released ===
Date	Position	Nationality	Name	Joined	Date	Ref.
9 June 2019	FW	(Argentina)	Antonio Rojano	Niki Volos		
30 June 2019	MF	(Ukraine)	Dmytro Ivanisenya	Zorya Luhansk		
31 August 2019	FW	(Georgia (country))	Levan Shengelia	Konyaspor		

== Friendlies ==
2019	–
GET (UTC+4)

== Competitions ==
=== Overview ===
Competition	First match	Last match	Starting round	Final position	Record							
Competition	First match	Last match	Starting round	Final position	Pld	W	D	L	GF	GA	GD	Win %
Erovnuli Liga	3 March 2019	1 December 2019	Matchday 1	Winners	36	23	6	7	70	31	+39	63.89
Georgian Cup	16 April 2019	19 June 2019	Third round	Fourth round	2	1	0	1	4	2	+2	50.00
UEFA Europa League	11 July 2019	15 August 2019	First qualifying round	Third qualifying round	6	4	1	1	13	5	+8	66.67
Total					44	28	7	9	87	38	+49	63.64

Last updated: 1 December 2019
Source: Competitions

=== Erovnuli Liga ===
==== Results summary ====
Overall								Home						Away					
Pld	W	D	L	GF	GA	GD	Pts	W	D	L	GF	GA	GD	W	D	L	GF	GA	GD
36	23	6	7	70	31	+39	75	13	2	3	37	17	+20	10	4	4	33	14	+19

Last updated: 1 December 2019.
Source: See Results

==== Results by round ====
Round	1	2	3	4	5	6	7	8	9	10	11	12	13	14	15	16	17	18	19	20	21	22	24	25	26	27	28	29	23	30	31	32	33	34	35	36
Ground	H	A	H	A	H	A	H	H	A	A	H	A	H	A	H	A	A	H	H	A	H	A	A	H	H	A	A	H	H	A	H	A	H	A	A	H
Result	W	L	L	W	W	D	W	W	L	D	W	L	L	L	W	W	W	W	W	W	W	W	W	D	W	W	W	D	W	D	L	D	W	W	W	W
Position	2	5	6	3	2	2	2	2	4	3	3	4	4	5	4	4	3	3	3	3	1	1	1	1	1	1	1	1	1	1	2	2	1	1	1	1

Source: See Results
A = Away; H = Home; W = Win; D = Draw; L = Loss

==== Results ====
3 March 2019 1	Dinamo Tbilisi	2–0	Chikhura Sachkhere	Tbilisi
18:00 GET (UTC+4)	Shulaia (yellow card) 31'; Shengelia 43', 47'; Zaria (yellow card) 82'; Ivanisenya (yellow card) 87'	Report	Megrelishvili (yellow card) 16' (yellow-red card) 33'	Stadium: Boris Paichadze Dinamo Arena; Attendance: 500; Referee: Giorgi Vadachkoria

6 March 2019 2	Sioni Bolnisi	2–1	Dinamo Tbilisi	Bolnisi
16:00 GET (UTC+4)	Ugulava 43' (pen.); Khmaladze (yellow card) 45'; Isiani 69' (yellow card) 72'; Tarkhnishvili (yellow card) 72'	Report	Rukhaia (yellow card) 14' (red card) 41'; Ivanisenya 28'; Noche (yellow card) 36'; Rojano (yellow card) 72'	Stadium: Tamaz Stepania Stadium; Attendance: 2,500; Referee: Giorgi Kruashvili

10 March 2019 3	Dinamo Tbilisi	0–1	Dinamo Batumi	Tbilisi
18:00 GET (UTC+4)	Medioub (yellow card) 72'; Shengelia (yellow card) 90+5'	Report	Gadrani 12' (yellow card) 20'; Chaladze (yellow card) 23'; Mandzhgaladze (yellow card) 26'; Ramos (yellow card) 47'; Meliava (yellow card) 71' (yellow-red card) 83'	Stadium: Boris Paichadze Dinamo Arena; Attendance: 550; Referee: Goga Kikacheishvili

17 March 2019 4	Locomotive Tbilisi	0–4	Dinamo Tbilisi	Tbilisi
19:00 GET (UTC+4)	Ardazishvili (yellow card) 28'; Dzebniauri (red card) 37'; Gvalia (yellow card) 38'; Chanturia (yellow card) 75'	Report	Kutalia 38' (pen.); Shengelia (yellow card) 44' (goal) 79' (pen.); Zaria 58'; Ivanisenya (yellow card) 75'; Rojano (yellow card) 85'; Chanturia 90' (o.g.)	Stadium: Mikheil Meskhi 2 Stadium; Attendance: 800; Referee: Jener Khorava

31 March 2019 5	Dinamo Tbilisi	4–2	Saburtalo Tbilisi	Tbilisi
16:00 GET (UTC+4)	Kutalia 20', 45+2' (pen.), 79'; Shulaia (yellow card) 54' (yellow-red card) 86'; Shengelia (yellow card) 60'; Carbià 90+3'	Report	Dvalishvili 4'; Kokhreidze (yellow card) 17' (goal) 24' (pen.); Shindagoridze (yellow card) 41'; Rolović (yellow card) 81'	Stadium: Boris Paichadze Dinamo Arena; Attendance: 1,100; Referee: Irakli Kvirikashvili

3 April 2019 6	Torpedo Kutaisi	0–0	Dinamo Tbilisi	Samtredia
16:00 GET (UTC+4)	Gigauri (yellow card) 24'; Tsintsadze (yellow card) 28'; Kapanadze (yellow card) 35'	Report	Carbià (yellow card) 43'	Stadium: Erosi Manjgaladze Stadium; Attendance: 2,900; Referee: Jener Khorava

7 April 2019 7	Dinamo Tbilisi	3–1	Rustavi	Tbilisi
19:00 GET (UTC+4)	Shengelia 29' (pen.); Shulaia 33'; Mongil (yellow card) 57'; Shengelia 58'; Medioub (yellow card) 90'	Report	Narimanidze (yellow card) 29'; Chogadze (yellow card) 43'; Imnadze 76'; Tsitsikishvili (yellow card) 88'; Kochladze (yellow card) 89'	Stadium: Boris Paichadze Dinamo Arena; Attendance: 400; Referee: Giorgi Avazashvili

12 April 2019 8	Dinamo Tbilisi	1–0	Dila Gori	Tbilisi
19:00 GET (UTC+4)	Carbià 33'; Papava (yellow card) 50'	Report	Nondi (yellow card) 68'; Goshteliani (yellow card) 90+3'	Stadium: Boris Paichadze Dinamo Arena; Attendance: 600; Referee: Davit Kharitonashvili

21 April 2019 9	WIT Georgia	1–0	Dinamo Tbilisi	Tbilisi
21:00 GET (UTC+4)	Sekhniashvili 53'; Kakashvili (yellow card) 72'; Zaridze (yellow card) 90+2'	Report	Ivanisenya (yellow card) 72'; Ninua (yellow card) 83'; Shulaia (yellow card) 87'	Stadium: Mikheil Meskhi 2 Stadium; Attendance: 450; Referee: Arsen Nonikashvili

25 April 2019 10	Chikhura Sachkhere	2–2	Dinamo Tbilisi	Tbilisi
18:00 GET (UTC+4)	Kamladze 56'; Chikvaidze (yellow card) 59'; Maisashvili (yellow card) 78'; Chiteishvili (yellow card) 80' (yellow-red card) 83'; Koripadze 90+6' (pen.)	Report	Kutalia 80'; Rukhaia 90+3'; Iashvili (yellow card) 90+5'; Perales (yellow card) 90+6'	Stadium: Mikheil Meskhi Stadium; Attendance: 550; Referee: Goga Kikacheishvili

4 May 2019 11	Dinamo Tbilisi	5–1	Sioni Bolnisi	Tbilisi
19:00 GET (UTC+4)	Kutalia 3', 60'; Papava 25'; Kardava 85'; Mongil 90+1'	Report	Ugulava (yellow card) 12'; Isiani 27'; Khmaladze (yellow card) 34'; Chachua (yellow card) 89'	Stadium: Boris Paichadze Dinamo Arena; Attendance: 450; Referee: Irakli Kvirikashvili

11 May 2019 12	Dinamo Batumi	3–2	Dinamo Tbilisi	Batumi
21:00 GET (UTC+4)	Tevdoradze 23' (pen.); Chaladze 34' (yellow card) 85'; Gaprindashvili 90+3' (yellow card) 90+4'	Report	Shengelia (yellow card) 22'; Adamadze 75' (o.g.); Alef 86' (o.g.); Iashvili (yellow card) 90'; Kutalia (yellow card) 90+4'	Stadium: Angisa Training Base; Attendance: 8,000; Referee: Jener Khorava

15 May 2019 13	Dinamo Tbilisi	1–3	Locomotive Tbilisi	Tbilisi
21:00 GET (UTC+4)	Ninua 54'	Report	Samurkasov 24'; Injgia 77'; Sikharulidze 90'	Stadium: Boris Paichadze Dinamo Arena; Attendance: 700; Referee: Papuna Matcharadze

20 May 2019 14	Saburtalo Tbilisi	2–0	Dinamo Tbilisi	Tbilisi
21:00 GET (UTC+4)	Dvalishvili (yellow card) 31'; Kakubava (yellow card) 37'; Shindagoridze 67', 75' (yellow card) 68'; Kokhreidze (yellow card) 77'	Report	Kutalia (yellow card) 45+2'; Rukhaia (yellow card) 64'; Shengelia (yellow card) 80'; Medioub (yellow card) 90+3'	Stadium: Mikheil Meskhi Stadium; Attendance: 400; Referee: Giorgi Kruashvili

24 May 2019 15	Dinamo Tbilisi	2–1	Torpedo Kutaisi	Tbilisi
19:00 GET (UTC+4)	Ivanisenya 31'; Shengelia 78'; Perales (yellow card) 90+1'	Report	Dolidze 62'	Stadium: Boris Paichadze Dinamo Arena; Attendance: 2,200; Referee: Tariel Rukhaia

28 May 2019 16	Rustavi	0–1	Dinamo Tbilisi	Rustavi
19:00 GET (UTC+4)		Report	Shengelia (yellow card) 29'; Kutalia 32'	Stadium: Technical Centre; Attendance: 500; Referee: Davit Kharitonashvili

1 June 2019 17	Dila Gori	2–3	Dinamo Tbilisi	Gori
18:30 GET (UTC+4)	Kougbenya 18'; Chaduneli (yellow card) 19'; Paim 49'	Report	Shengelia 5'; Medioub 21'; Shengelia 39'; Rukhaia (yellow card) 61'	Stadium: Tengiz Burjanadze Stadium; Attendance: 2,700; Referee: Papuna Matcharadze

16 June 2019 18	Dinamo Tbilisi	2–1	WIT Georgia	Tbilisi
19:00 GET (UTC+4)	Ivanisenya 14'; Shengelia 90'	Report	Mosiashvili 42'; Gaprindashvili (yellow card) 53'; Museliani (yellow card) 57'; Isergishvili (yellow card) 67'	Stadium: Boris Paichadze Dinamo Arena; Attendance: 1,100; Referee: Irakli Kvirikashvili

23 June 2019 19	Dinamo Tbilisi	1–0	Chikhura Sachkhere	Tbilisi
19:30 GET (UTC+4)	Ninua (yellow card) 46' (yellow-red card) 89' (goal) 80'	Report	Chikvaidze (yellow card) 44'; Kashia (yellow card) 79' (yellow-red card) 87'	Stadium: Boris Paichadze Dinamo Arena; Attendance: 600; Referee: Tariel Rukhaia

27 June 2019 20	Sioni Bolnisi	0–3	Dinamo Tbilisi	Bolnisi
18:00 GET (UTC+4)	Apakidze (yellow card) 63'	Report	Medioub (yellow card) 42'; Shengelia 43', 70'; Ivanisenya (yellow card) 63'; Kutalia 79'	Stadium: Tamaz Stepania Stadium; Attendance: 800; Referee: Papuna Matcharadze

3 July 2019 21	Dinamo Tbilisi	2–1	Dinamo Batumi	Tbilisi
21:00 GET (UTC+4)	Papava 4'; Kutalia (yellow card) 38' (goal) 82'; Kobouri (yellow card) 63'	Report	Flamarion 26'; Chaladze (yellow card) 44'; Kobakhidze (yellow card) 60'; Teidi (yellow card) 90+4'	Stadium: Boris Paichadze Dinamo Arena; Attendance: 5,500; Referee: Irakli Kvirikashvili

4 August 2019 22	Locomotive Tbilisi	0–6	Dinamo Tbilisi	Tbilisi
21:00 GET (UTC+4)	Kirkitadze (yellow card) 38'; Samurkasov (yellow card) 42'; Komakhidze (yellow card) 60'	Report	Ninua 3', 44'; Kutalia 38'; Kavtaradze 41'; Shulaia 71'; Karikari 77'	Stadium: Mikheil Meskhi 2 Stadium; Attendance: 1,300; Referee: Goga Kikacheishvili

20 August 2019 24	Torpedo Kutaisi	0–1	Dinamo Tbilisi	Tsqaltubo
17:30 GET (UTC+4)	Khurtsilava (yellow card) 74'	Report	Kutalia 29'; Papava (yellow card) 51'; Shyshka (yellow card) 84'	Stadium: 26 May Stadium; Attendance: 2,300; Referee: Jener Khorava

25 August 2019 25	Dinamo Tbilisi	2–2	Rustavi	Tbilisi
21:00 GET (UTC+4)	Shengelia 18'; Ninua (yellow card) 47' (goal) 50'; Kimadze (yellow card) 56'	Report	Kavtaradze 55', 84'	Stadium: Boris Paichadze Dinamo Arena; Attendance: 700; Referee: Irakli Kvirikashvili

29 August 2019 26	Dinamo Tbilisi	5–0	Dila Gori	Tbilisi
20:00 GET (UTC+4)	Kutalia 13', 57'; Kavtaradze 29'; Shulaia 87'; Karikari 88'	Report	Lamptey (yellow card) 51'	Stadium: Boris Paichadze Dinamo Arena; Attendance: 600; Referee: Goga Kikacheishvili

15 September 2019 27	WIT Georgia	0–3	Dinamo Tbilisi	Tbilisi
18:00 GET (UTC+4)	Nemsadze (yellow card) 28'; Museliani (yellow card) 45'; Khutsianidze (yellow card) 60'; Makatsaria (yellow card) 72'	Report	Kutalia 11' (pen.); Ninua (yellow card) 30' (goal) 60'; Kavtaradze 50'; Mongil (yellow card) 72'	Stadium: Mikheil Meskhi 2 Stadium; Attendance: 350; Referee: Jener Khorava

21 September 2019 28	Chikhura Sachkhere	0–2	Dinamo Tbilisi	Sachkhere
16:00 GET (UTC+4)	Maisashvili (yellow card) 56'; Mumladze (yellow card) 83'	Report	Shulaia (yellow card) 54'; Kutalia 87' (pen.), 90+5'	Stadium: Ivantsminda stadium Attendance: 1,300; Referee: Irakli Kvirikashvili

28 September 2019 29	Dinamo Tbilisi	1–1	Sioni Bolnisi	Tbilisi
18:00 GET (UTC+4)	Kukhianidze 32'; Kavtaradze (red card) 90+1'; Karikari (yellow card) 90+5'	Report	Apakidze (yellow card) 22'; Kakhabrishvili (yellow card) 37'; Khmaladze 90+2'; Targamadze (yellow card) 90+3'; Goshadze (yellow card) 90+5'	Stadium: Boris Paichadze Dinamo Arena; Attendance: 400; Referee: Irakli Kvirikashvili

2 October 2019 23	Dinamo Tbilisi	2–1	Saburtalo Tbilisi	Tbilisi
20:00 GET (UTC+4)	Ninua 69', 75' (pen.)	Report	Sandokhadze (yellow card) 21' (red card) 67'; Mali (yellow card) 31'; Kupatadze (yellow card) 86'	Stadium: Boris Paichadze Dinamo Arena; Attendance: 3,500; Referee: Giorgi Kruashvili

6 October 2019 30	Dinamo Batumi	1–1	Dinamo Tbilisi	Batumi
20:00 GET (UTC+4)	Gegetchkori (yellow card) 40'; Flamarion 56' (pen.)	Report	Iashvili (yellow card) 42'; Zaria (yellow card) 54'; Kimadze (yellow card) 78'; Mchedlidze 83'; Kapliyenko (yellow card) 90+1'	Stadium: Angisa Training Base; Attendance: 6,500; Referee: Marcel Bîrsan

19 October 2019 31	Dinamo Tbilisi	0–1	Locomotive Tbilisi	Tbilisi
18:00 GET (UTC+4)		Report	Kirkitadze 90+4'	Stadium: Boris Paichadze Dinamo Arena; Attendance: 1,100; Referee: Goga Kikacheishvili

27 October 2019 32	Saburtalo Tbilisi	0–0	Dinamo Tbilisi	Tbilisi
15:00 GET (UTC+4)	Altunashvili (yellow card) 36'; Kupatadze (yellow card) 62'; Kokhreidze (yellow card) 66'	Report	Kapliyenko (yellow card) 35'	Stadium: Mikheil Meskhi Stadium; Attendance: 2,200; Referee: Irakli Kvirikashvili

3 November 2019 33	Dinamo Tbilisi	2–1	Torpedo Kutaisi	Tbilisi
19:00 GET (UTC+4)	Kutalia 20', 34'; Papava (yellow card) 28'; Kavtaradze (yellow card) 88'	Report	Kiknadze 90+4'	Stadium: Boris Paichadze Dinamo Arena; Attendance: 900; Referee: Papuna Matcharadze

9 November 2019 34	Rustavi	0–2	Dinamo Tbilisi	Rustavi
14:00 GET (UTC+4)		Report	Kimadze (yellow card) 28'; Kavtaradze 76'; Shyshka 89'	Stadium: Technical Centre; Attendance: 600; Referee: Tariel Rukhaia

24 November 2019 35	Dila Gori	1–2	Dinamo Tbilisi	Gori
14:00 GET (UTC+4)	Goshteliani (yellow card) 50'; Nonikashvili (yellow card) 55'; Kovtalyuk (yellow card) 63' (goal) 90+3'	Report	Razmadze 27' (o.g.); Kavtaradze (yellow card) 33' (goal) 42'; Mongil (yellow card) 66'; Kimadze (yellow card) 72'; Perales (yellow card) 85'	Stadium: Tengiz Burjanadze Stadium; Attendance: 1,800; Referee: Irakli Kvirikashvili

1 December 2019 36	Dinamo Tbilisi	2–0	WIT Georgia	Tbilisi
16:00 GET (UTC+4)	Kutalia 35'; Kavtaradze (yellow card) 42'; Daffé 86'	Report	Nusuyev (yellow card) 25'	Stadium: Boris Paichadze Dinamo Arena; Attendance: 5,700; Referee: Papuna Matcharadze

==== League table ====
Pos	Team	Pld	W	D	L	GF	GA	GD	Pts	Qualification or relegation
1	Dinamo Tbilisi (C)	36	23	6	7	70	31	+39	75	Qualification for the Champions League first qualifying round
2	Dinamo Batumi	36	21	7	8	57	31	+26	70 (Note: Head-to-head points: Dinamo Batumi 7, Saburtalo Tbilisi 4)	Qualification for the Europa League first qualifying round
3	Saburtalo Tbilisi	36	21	7	8	67	36	+31	70	Qualification for the Europa League first qualifying round
4	Locomotive Tbilisi	36	17	4	15	44	46	−2	55	Qualification for the Europa League first qualifying round
5	Chikhura Sachkhere	36	12	11	13	48	44	+4	47	

Source: Erovnuli Liga, Soccerway
Rules for classification: 1) Points; 2) Head-to-head points; 3) Head-to-head goal difference; 4) Head-to-head goals scored; 5) Head-to-head away goals scored (only if two teams); 6) Goal difference; 7) Goals scored.
(C) Champions

=== Georgian Cup ===
16 April 2019 Third round	Egrisi Senaki	1–4	Dinamo Tbilisi	Martvili
15:00 GET (UTC+4)	Kobalia 89' (pen.)	Report	Shengelia 11', 66', 69', 76'	Stadium: Murtaz Khurtsilava stadium Attendance: 2,000; Referee: Irakli Kvirikashvili

19 June 2019 Fourth round	Merani Tbilisi	1–0 (a.e.t.)	Dinamo Tbilisi	Tbilisi
19:00 GET (UTC+4)	Sharikadze (yellow card) 44'; Popkhadze (yellow card) 54'; Datunaishvili (yellow card) 78'; Pipia 114' (pen.)	Report	Kardava (yellow card) 42'	Stadium: Sinatle Stadium; Attendance: 800; Referee: Papuna Matcharadze

=== UEFA Europa League ===
==== Qualifying rounds ====
11 July 2019 First qualifying round 1st leg	Dinamo Tbilisi (Georgia (country))	6–0	(Andorra) Engordany	Tbilisi, Georgia
21:00 GET (UTC+4)	Ninua 6'; Kukhianidze 21', 71'; Kavtaradze 61'; Kutalia 69' (pen.) (yellow card) 71'; Zaria (yellow card) 79' (goal) 80'	Report	Ryahi (yellow card) 5'; Varela (yellow card) 66'; Serra (yellow card) 71'; Spano (yellow card) 75'; Peppe (yellow card) 85'	Stadium: Boris Paichadze Dinamo Arena; Attendance: 3,680; Referee: Morten Krogh (Denmark)

18 July 2019 First qualifying round 2nd leg	Engordany (Andorra)	0–1 (0–7 agg.)	(Georgia (country)) Dinamo Tbilisi	Andorra la Vella, Andorra
21:30 GET (UTC+4)	Spano (yellow card) 69'; Ferré (yellow card) 71'	Report	Medioub 81'	Stadium: Estadi Comunal; Attendance: 408; Referee: Balázs Berke (Hungary)

25 July 2019 Second qualifying round 1st leg	Gabala (Azerbaijan)	0–2	(Georgia (country)) Dinamo Tbilisi	Qabala, Azerbaijan
19:00 GET (UTC+4)	López (yellow card) 5'; Clésio (yellow card) 6'; Gigauri (yellow card) 39'; Ramaldanov (yellow card) 45+3'; Volkovi (yellow card) 58'; Kouakou (yellow card) 90+1'	Report	Kutalia 41' (yellow card) 62'; Kavtaradze (yellow card) 45+3'; Shengelia (yellow card) 60'; Papava (yellow card) 66'; Kardava (yellow card) 74'; Daffé 87'	Stadium: Gabala City Stadium; Attendance: 2,800; Referee: Nick Walsh (Scotland)

1 August 2019 Second qualifying round 2nd leg	Dinamo Tbilisi (Georgia (country))	3–0 (5–0 agg.)	(Azerbaijan) Gabala	Tbilisi, Georgia
21:00 GET (UTC+4)	Mongil (yellow card) 28'; Shengelia 68', 88'; Karikari 90+3'	Report	Alıyev (yellow card) 46'; Ramaldanov (yellow card) 54'	Stadium: Boris Paichadze Dinamo Arena; Attendance: 8,153; Referee: Petri Viljanen (Finland)

8 August 2019 Third qualifying round 1st leg	Feyenoord (Netherlands)	4–0	(Georgia (country)) Dinamo Tbilisi	Rotterdam, Netherlands
21:30 GET (UTC+4)	Sinisterra 43'; Tapia (yellow card) 51'; Haps (yellow card) 67'; Kobouri 82' (o.g.); Berghuis 85' (pen.); Narsingh 88'	Report	Kukhianidze (yellow card) 28'; Kutalia (yellow card) 36'; Kimadze (yellow card) 65'; Shulaia (yellow card) 76' (yellow-red card) 79'	Stadium: De Kuip; Attendance: 36,500; Referee: Serhiy Boyko (Ukraine)

15 August 2019 Third qualifying round 2nd leg	Dinamo Tbilisi (Georgia (country))	1–1 (1–5 agg.)	(Netherlands) Feyenoord	Tbilisi, Georgia
20:30 GET (UTC+4)	Papava (yellow card) 43'; Kavtaradze (yellow card) 45'; Shengelia 52' (yellow card) 85'; Shyshka (yellow card) 58'	Report	Geertruida (yellow card) 30'; Berghuis (yellow card) 45+3'; Botteghin 57'	Stadium: Boris Paichadze Dinamo Arena; Attendance: 0 Referee: Sascha Stegemann (Germany)

== Squad statistics ==
As of match played 1 December 2019

=== Appearances and goals ===
No.	Pos	Nat	Player	Total		Erovnuli Liga		Georgian Cup		UEFA Europa League	
No.	Pos	Nat	Player	Apps	Goals	Apps	Goals	Apps	Goals	Apps	Goals
1	GK	(Spain) ESP	José Perales	42	0	34+1	0	1	0	6	0
2	DF	(Russia) RUS	Guja Rukhaia	25	1	17+2	1	1	0	4+1	0
3	DF	(Spain) ESP	Víctor Mongil	43	1	36	1	2	0	5	0
5	DF	(Georgia (country)) GEO	Davit Kobouri	30	0	18+5	0	1	0	6	0
6	MF	(Georgia (country)) GEO	Bakar Kardava	28	1	7+14	1	2	0	2+3	0
7	MF	(Georgia (country)) GEO	Giorgi Zaria	25	2	8+14	1	1	0	1+1	1
8	MF	(Georgia (country)) GEO	Giorgi Kukhianidze	30	3	14+9	1	2	0	4+1	2
9	FW	(Ghana) GHA	Kwame Karikari	11	3	5+3	2	0	0	0+3	1
10	FW	(Georgia (country)) GEO	Levan Mchedlidze	5	1	0+5	1	0	0	0	0
11	MF	(Georgia (country)) GEO	Akaki Shulaia	33	3	23+6	3	1+1	0	1+1	0
14	MF	(Senegal) SEN	Arfang Daffé	17	2	5+8	1	0	0	1+3	1
15	MF	(Georgia (country)) GEO	Giorgi Papava	40	2	32+2	2	1	0	5	0
16	DF	(Georgia (country)) GEO	Giorgi Kimadze	19	0	14	0	0	0	5	0
19	FW	(Georgia (country)) GEO	Levan Kutalia	39	22	32+1	20	1	0	5	2
23	DF	(Georgia (country)) GEO	Irakli Azarovi	8	0	1+6	0	0	0	0+1	0
24	DF	(Georgia (country)) GEO	Nodar Iashvili	38	0	30+3	0	2	0	2+1	0
26	FW	(Georgia (country)) GEO	Giorgi Abuashvili	2	0	0+1	0	0+1	0	0	0
29	DF	(Ukraine) UKR	Oleksandr Kapliyenko	14	0	11+1	0	0+1	0	1	0
32	MF	(Georgia (country)) GEO	Nika Ninua	39	9	28+3	8	0+2	0	5+1	1
35	MF	(Ukraine) UKR	Mykhaylo Shyshka	9	1	1+6	1	0	0	1+1	0
36	MF	(Georgia (country)) GEO	Mate Kvirkvia	1	0	0+1	0	0	0	0	0
38	MF	(Russia) RUS	Nodar Kavtaradze	19	6	13	5	0	0	5+1	1
Players away from Dinamo Tbilisi on loan:
21	DF	(Georgia (country)) GEO	Tornike Dzotsenidze	1	0	0	0	0+1	0	0	0
Players who left Dinamo Tbilisi during the season:
4	DF	(France) FRA	Abdeljalil Medioub	22	2	19	1	1	0	2	1
9	FW	(Argentina) ARG	Antonio Rojano	10	0	2+7	0	1	0	0	0
18	MF	(Ukraine) UKR	Dmytro Ivanisenya	17	3	13+3	3	1	0	0	0
22	DF	(Spain) ESP	Sergio Noche Márquez	4	0	3	0	1	0	0	0
27	FW	(Georgia (country)) GEO	Levan Shengelia	31	19	23+1	12	2	4	5	3
28	FW	(Spain) ESP	Fran Carbià	12	2	5+6	2	0+1	0	0	0
33	GK	(Moldova) MDA	Ștefan Sicaci	3	0	2	0	1	0	0	0

=== Goal scorers ===
Place	Position	Nation	Number	Name	Erovnuli Liga	Georgian Cup	UEFA Europa League	Total
1	FW	(Georgia (country))	19	Levan Kutalia	20	0	2	22
2	FW	(Georgia (country))	27	Levan Shengelia	12	4	3	19
3	MF	(Georgia (country))	32	Nika Ninua	8	0	1	9
4	MF	(Russia)	38	Nodar Kavtaradze	5	0	1	6
5	FW	(Georgia (country))	11	Akaki Shulaia	3	0	0	5
6				Own goal	4	0	0	4
7	FW	(Ukraine)	18	Dmytro Ivanisenya	3	0	0	3
7	FW	(Ghana)	9	Kwame Karikari	2	0	1	3
7	MF	(Georgia (country))	8	Giorgi Kukhianidze	1	0	2	3
10	MF	(Georgia (country))	15	Giorgi Papava	2	0	0	2
10	FW	(Spain)	28	Fran Carbià	2	0	0	2
10	DF	(France)	4	Abdeljalil Medioub	1	0	1	2
10	MF	(Georgia (country))	7	Giorgi Zaria	1	0	1	2
14	DF	(Russia)	2	Guja Rukhaia	1	0	0	1
14	DF	(Spain)	3	Víctor Mongil	1	0	0	1
14	MF	(Georgia (country))	6	Bakar Kardava	1	0	0	1
14	MF	(Senegal)	14	Arfang Daffé	1	0	1	2
14	MF	(Ukraine)	35	Mykhaylo Shyshka	1	0	0	1
14	FW	(Georgia (country))	10	Levan Mchedlidze	1	0	0	1
				TOTALS	70	4	13	87

=== Clean sheets ===
Place	Position	Nation	Number	Name	Erovnuli Liga	Georgian Cup	UEFA Europa League	Total
1	GK	(Spain)	1	José Perales	15	0	4	19
				TOTALS	15	0	4	19

=== Disciplinary record ===
Number	Nation	Position	Name	Erovnuli Liga		Georgian Cup		UEFA Europa League		Total	
Number	Nation	Position	Name	Yellow card	Red card	Yellow card	Red card	Yellow card	Red card	Yellow card	Red card
1	(Spain)	GK	José Perales	3	0	0	0	0	0	3	0
2	(Russia)	DF	Guja Rukhaia	3	1	0	0	0	0	3	1
3	(Spain)	DF	Víctor Mongil	3	0	0	0	1	0	4	0
5	(Georgia (country))	DF	Davit Kobouri	1	0	0	0	0	0	1	0
6	(Georgia (country))	MF	Bakar Kardava	0	0	1	0	1	0	2	0
7	(Georgia (country))	MF	Giorgi Zaria	2	0	0	0	1	0	13	0
8	(Georgia (country))	MF	Giorgi Kukhianidze	0	0	0	0	1	0	1	0
9	(Ghana)	FW	Kwame Karikari	1	0	0	0	0	0	1	0
11	(Georgia (country))	MF	Akaki Shulaia	5	1	0	0	2	1	7	2
15	(Georgia (country))	MF	Giorgi Papava	3	0	0	0	2	0	5	0
16	(Georgia (country))	DF	Giorgi Kimadze	4	0	0	0	1	0	5	0
19	(Georgia (country))	FW	Levan Kutalia	3	0	0	0	3	0	6	0
24	(Georgia (country))	DF	Nodar Iashvili	3	0	0	0	0	0	3	0
29	(Ukraine)	DF	Oleksandr Kapliyenko	2	0	0	0	0	0	2	0
32	(Georgia (country))	MF	Nika Ninua	5	1	0	0	0	0	5	1
35	(Ukraine)	MF	Mykhaylo Shyshka	1	0	0	0	1	0	2	0
38	(Russia)	MF	Nodar Kavtaradze	3	1	0	0	2	0	5	1
Players away on loan:
Players who left Dinamo Tbilisi during the season:
4	(France)	DF	Abdeljalil Medioub	4	0	0	0	0	0	4	0
9	(Argentina)	FW	Antonio Rojano	2	0	0	0	0	0	2	0
18	(Ukraine)	MF	Dmytro Ivanisenya	4	0	0	0	0	0	4	0
22	(Spain)	DF	Sergio Noche Márquez	1	0	0	0	0	0	1	0
27	(Georgia (country))	FW	Levan Shengelia	6	0	0	0	2	0	8	0
28	(Spain)	FW	Fran Carbià	1	0	0	0	0	0	1	0
			TOTALS	60	4	1	0	17	1	78	5
