= FC Dinamo Tbilisi in European football =

Georgian club in European football

- Club: FC Dinamo Tbilisi
- Seasons played: 42
- Top scorer: Ramaz Shengelia (19)
- First entry: 1972–73 UEFA Cup
- Latest entry: 2026–27 UEFA Conference League

Titles
- Cup Winners' Cup: 1981

Dinamo Tbilisi is a Georgian football club based in Tbilisi, which has regularly taken part in European competitions since its first appearance in the 1972–73 UEFA Cup. Since then, the club has competed in every UEFA-organized competition, with the exception of the UEFA Super Cup.

== History ==
On 13 May 1981, Dinamo Tbilisi became the first Georgian club to win a UEFA title by defeating Carl Zeiss Jena in the 1981 European Cup Winners' Cup final.

=== Matches ===
As of match played 30 July 2026

Season	Competition	Round	Club	Home	Away	Aggregate
1972–73	UEFA Cup	R1	(Netherlands) Twente	3–2	0–2	3–4
1973–74	UEFA Cup	R1	(Bulgaria) Slavia Sofia	4–1	0–2	4–3
1973–74	UEFA Cup	R2	(Socialist Federal Republic of Yugoslavia) OFK Beograd	3–0	5–1	8–1
1973–74	UEFA Cup	R3	(England) Tottenham Hotspur	1–1	1–5	2–6
1976–77	European Cup Winners' Cup	R1	(Wales) Cardiff City	3–0	0–1	3–1
1976–77	European Cup Winners' Cup	R2	(Hungary) MTK Budapest	1–4	0–1	1–5
1977–78	UEFA Cup	R1	(Italy) Inter Milan	0–0	1–0	1–0
1977–78	UEFA Cup	R2	(Denmark) KB	2–1	4–1	6–2
1977–78	UEFA Cup	R3	(Switzerland) Grasshopper Zürich	1–0	0–4	1–4
1978–79	UEFA Cup	R1	(Italy) Napoli	2–0	1–1	3–1
1978–79	UEFA Cup	R2	(Germany) Hertha BSC	1–0	0–2	1–2
1979–80	European Cup	R1	(England) Liverpool	3–0	1–2	4–2
1979–80	European Cup	R2	(Germany) Hamburg	2–3	1–3	3–6
1980–81	European Cup Winners' Cup	R1	(Greece) Kastoria	2–0	0–0	2–0
1980–81	European Cup Winners' Cup	R2	(Republic of Ireland) Waterford	4–0	1–0	5–0
1980–81	European Cup Winners' Cup	QF	(England) West Ham United	0–1	4–1	5–2
1980–81	European Cup Winners' Cup	SF	(Netherlands) Feyenoord	3–0	0–2	3–2
1980–81	European Cup Winners' Cup	Final	(East Germany) Carl Zeiss Jena	2–1		
1981–82	European Cup Winners' Cup	R1	(Austria) Grazer AK	2–0	2–2	4–2
1981–82	European Cup Winners' Cup	R2	(France) Bastia	3–1	1–1	4–2
1981–82	European Cup Winners' Cup	QF	(Poland) Legia Warsaw	1–0	1–0	2–0
1981–82	European Cup Winners' Cup	SF	(Belgium) Standard Liège	0–1	0–1	0–2
1982–83	UEFA Cup	R1	(Italy) Napoli	2–1	0–1	2–2 (a)
1987–88	UEFA Cup	R1	(Bulgaria) Lokomotiv Sofia	3–0	1–3	4–3
1987–88	UEFA Cup	R2	(Romania) Victoria București	0–0	2–1	2–1
1987–88	UEFA Cup	R3	(Germany) Werder Bremen	1–1	1–2	2–3
1993–94	UEFA Champions League	PR	(Northern Ireland) Linfield	2–1	1–1	3–2 (Note: Dinamo Tbilisi were ejected from the competition by UEFA after a failed attempt to bribe the referee for the first leg.)
1994–95	UEFA Cup	PR	(Romania) Universitatea Craiova	2–0	2–1	4–1
1994–95	UEFA Cup	R1	(Austria) Tirol Innsbruck	1–0	1–5	2–5
1995–96	UEFA Cup	PR	(Bulgaria) Botev Plovdiv	0–1	0–1	0–2
1996–97	UEFA Cup	PR	(Luxembourg) Grevenmacher	4–0	2–2	6–2
1996–97	UEFA Cup	QR	(Norway) Molde	2–1	0–0	2–1
1996–97	UEFA Cup	R1	(Russia) Torpedo Moscow	1–1	1–0	2–1
1996–97	UEFA Cup	R2	(Portugal) Boavista	1–0	0–5	1–5
1997–98	UEFA Champions League	QR1	(Northern Ireland) Crusaders	5–1	3–1	8–2
1997–98	UEFA Champions League	QR2	(Germany) Bayer Leverkusen	1–0	1–6	2–6
1997–98	UEFA Cup	R1	(Belarus) Slavia Mozyr	1–0	1–1	2–1
1997–98	UEFA Cup	R2	(Portugal) Braga	0–1	0–4	0–5
1998–99	UEFA Champions League	QR1	(Albania) Vllaznia Shkodër	3–0 (Note: First leg was finished 1–0 after normal time, but later awarded 3–0 by default.)	1–3	4–3
1998–99	UEFA Champions League	QR2	(Spain) Athletic Bilbao	2–1	0–1	2–2 (a)
1998–99	UEFA Cup	R1	(Netherlands) Willem II	0–3	0–3	0–6
1999–2000	UEFA Champions League	2QR	(Moldova) Zimbru Chișinău	2–1	0–2	2–3
2000	UEFA Intertoto Cup	R1	(Belgium) Standard Liège	2–2	1–1	3–3 (a)
2001–02	UEFA Cup	QR	(Belarus) BATE Borisov	2–1	0–4	2–5
2002–03	UEFA Cup	QR	(Estonia) TVMK Tallinn	4–1	1–0	5–1
2002–03	UEFA Cup	R1	(Czech Republic) Slovan Liberec	0–1	2–3	2–4
2003–04	UEFA Champions League	1QR	(Albania) Tirana	3–0	0–3	3–3 (2–4 p)
2004–05	UEFA Cup	1QR	(Belarus) BATE Borisov	1–0	3–2	4–2
2004–05	UEFA Cup	2QR	(Czech Republic) Slavia Prague	2–0	1–3	3–3 (a)
2004–05	UEFA Cup	R1	(Poland) Wisła Kraków	2–1	3–4	5–5 (a)
2004–05	UEFA Cup	Group D	(France) Sochaux-Montbéliard	0–2	—N/a	5th
2004–05	UEFA Cup	Group D	(England) Newcastle United	—N/a	0–2	5th
2004–05	UEFA Cup	Group D	(Portugal) Sporting CP	0–4	—N/a	5th
2004–05	UEFA Cup	Group D	(Greece) Panionios	—N/a	2–5	5th
2005–06	UEFA Champions League	1QR	(Estonia) Levadia Tallinn	2–0	0–1	2–1
2005–06	UEFA Champions League	2QR	(Denmark) Brøndby	0–2	1–3	1–5
2006	UEFA Intertoto Cup	R1	(Armenia) Kilikia	3–0	5–1	8–1
2006	UEFA Intertoto Cup	R2	(Austria) SV Ried	0–1	1–3	1–4
2007–08	UEFA Cup	1QR	(Liechtenstein) Vaduz	2–0	0–0	2–0
2007–08	UEFA Cup	2QR	(Austria) Rapid Wien	0–3	0–5	0–8
2008–09	UEFA Champions League	1QR	(Faroe Islands) NSÍ Runavík	3–0	0–1	3–1
2008–09	UEFA Champions League	2QR	(Greece) Panathinaikos	0–0	0–3	0–3
2009–10	UEFA Europa League	1QR	(Latvia) Liepājas Metalurgs	3–1	1–2	4–3
2009–10	UEFA Europa League	2QR	(Serbia) Red Star Belgrade	2–0	2–5	4–5
2010–11	UEFA Europa League	1QR	(Estonia) Flora	2–1	0–0	2–1
2010–11	UEFA Europa League	2QR	(Sweden) Gefle	2–1	2–1	4–2
2010–11	UEFA Europa League	3QR	(Austria) Sturm Graz	1–1	0–2	1–3
2011–12	UEFA Europa League	1QR	(Moldova) Milsami Orhei	2–0	3–1	5–1
2011–12	UEFA Europa League	2QR	(Wales) Llanelli Town	5–0	1–2	6–2
2011–12	UEFA Europa League	3QR	(Iceland) KR	2–0	4–1	6–1
2011–12	UEFA Europa League	PO	(Greece) AEK Athens	1–1	0–1	1–2
2013–14	UEFA Champions League	2QR	(Faroe Islands) EB/Streymur	6–1	3–1	9–1
2013–14	UEFA Champions League	3QR	(Romania) FCSB	0–2	1–1	1–3
2013–14	UEFA Europa League	PO	(England) Tottenham Hotspur	0–5	0–3	0–8
2014–15	UEFA Champions League	2QR	(Kazakhstan) Aktobe	0–1	0–3	0–4
2015–16	UEFA Europa League	1QR	(Azerbaijan) Gabala	2–1	0–2	2–3
2016–17	UEFA Champions League	2QR	(Armenia) Alashkert	2–0	1–1	3–1
2016–17	UEFA Champions League	3QR	(Croatia) Dinamo Zagreb	0–1	0–2	0–3
2016–17	UEFA Europa League	PO	(Greece) PAOK	0–3	0–2	0–5
2018–19	UEFA Europa League	1QR	(Slovakia) DAC 1904	1–2	1–1	2–3
2019–20	UEFA Europa League	1QR	(Andorra) UE Engordany	6–0	1–0	7–0
2019–20	UEFA Europa League	2QR	(Azerbaijan) Gabala	3–0	2–0	5–0
2019–20	UEFA Europa League	3QR	(Netherlands) Feyenoord	1–1	0–4	1–5
2020–21	UEFA Champions League	1QR	(Albania) Tirana	0–2	—N/a	0–2
2020–21	UEFA Europa League	2QR	(Wales) Connah's Quay Nomads	—N/a	1–0	1–0
2020–21	UEFA Europa League	3QR	(Faroe Islands) KÍ	—N/a	1–6	1–6
2021–22	UEFA Champions League	1QR	(Azerbaijan) Neftçi	1–2	1–2	2–4
2021–22	UEFA Europa Conference League	2QR	(Israel) Maccabi Haifa	1–2	1–5	2–7
2022–23	UEFA Europa Conference League	1QR	(Estonia) Paide Linnameeskond	2–3	2–1	4–4 (5–6 p)
2023–24	UEFA Champions League	1QR	(Kazakhstan) Astana	1–2	1–1	2–3
2023–24	UEFA Europa Conference League	2QR	(Malta) Ħamrun Spartans	0–1	1–2	1–3
2024–25	UEFA Conference League	1QR	(Montenegro) Mornar	1–1	1–2	2–3
2026–27	UEFA Conference League	1QR	(Luxembourg) Mondorf-les-Bains	1–1	2–1	3–2
2026–27	UEFA Conference League	2QR	(Lithuania) Žalgiris	3–0	2–7	5–7

== Player statistics ==
=== Goalscorers ===
As of match played 30 July 2026

	Name	Years	UEFA Cup	UEFA Cup Winners' Cup	European Cup	UEFA Champions League	UEFA Intertoto Cup	UEFA Europa League	UEFA Conference League	Total	Ratio
1	(Soviet Union) Ramaz Shengelia	1977-1988	8 ( )	10 ( )	1 ( )	(-)	(-)	(-)	(-)	19 ( )	1
2	(Soviet Union) David Kipiani	1969, 1971-1982	7 ( )	1 ( )	2 ( )	(-)	(-)	(-)	(-)	10 ( )	1
3	(Soviet Union) Vladimir Gutsaev	1971-1986	(-)	6 ( )	2 ( )	(-)	(-)	(-)	(-)	8 ( )	1
4	(Soviet Union) Aleksandre Chivadze	1974-1987	2 ( )	2 ( )	2 ( )	(-)	(-)	(-)	(-)	6 ( )	1
4	(Soviet Union) Tengiz Sulakvelidze	1978-1988	2 ( )	4 ( )	(-)	(-)	(-)	(-)	(-)	6 ( )	1
4	(Georgia (country)) Aleksandr Iashvili	1993-1997, 2015-2016	3 ( )	(-)	(-)	3 ( )	(-)	(-)	(-)	6 ( )	1
7	(Soviet Union) Givi Nodia	1967-1975	5 ( )	(-)	(-)	(-)	(-)	(-)	(-)	5 ( )	1
7	(Georgia (country)) Davit Mujiri	1994-1998, 2010	1 ( )	(-)	(-)	4 ( )	(-)	(-)	(-)	5 ( )	1
7	(Spain) Xisco Muñoz	2011-2014	(-)	(-)	(-)	2 (6)	(-)	3 (6)	(-)	5 (12)	0.42
7	(Georgia (country)) Mate Vatsadze	2005-2010, 2018, 2024-Present	(-)	(-)	(-)	(-)	(-)	3 ( )	2 (4)	5 ( )	1
11	(Soviet Union) Vitaly Daraselia	1975-1982	1 ( )	3 ( )	(-)	(-)	(-)	(-)	(-)	4 ( )	1
11	(Georgia (country)) Shota Arveladze	1991-1994	2 ( )	(-)	(-)	2 ( )	(-)	(-)	(-)	4 ( )	1
11	(Georgia (country)) Kakhaber Gogichaishvili	1988-1991, 1995-1997, 1998-1999	3 ( )	(-)	(-)	1 ( )	(-)	(-)	(-)	4 ( )	1
11	(Georgia (country)) Levan Khomeriki	1995-1998	(-)	(-)	(-)	4 ( )	(-)	(-)	(-)	4 ( )	1
11	(Georgia (country)) Vitali Daraselia Jr.	2001-2004, 2005-2006	3 ( )	(-)	(-)	1 ( )	(-)	(-)	(-)	4 ( )	1
11	(Georgia (country)) Levan Melkadze	1998-1999, 2003-2006	2 ( )	(-)	(-)	2 ( )	(-)	(-)	(-)	4 ( )	1
11	(Georgia (country)) Giorgi Merebashvili	2005-2010, 2012-2014	1 ( )	(-)	(-)	(-)	(-)	3 ( )	(-)	4 ( )	1
11	(Georgia (country)) Levan Khmaladze	2004-2010, 2010-2013	(-)	(-)	(-)	(-)	(-)	4 ( )	(-)	4 ( )	1
11	(Brazil) Robertinho	2010-2013	(-)	(-)	(-)	(-)	(-)	4 (20)	(-)	4 (10)	0.4
11	(Georgia (country)) Jaba Dvali	2004-2007, 2012-2014	(-)	(-)	(-)	2 ( )	2 ( )	(-)	(-)	4 ( )	1
21	(Soviet Union) Revaz Chelebadze	1976-1982, 1985-1987	3 ( )	(-)	(-)	(-)	(-)	(-)	(-)	3 ( )	1
21	(Georgia (country)) Mikheil Kakaladze	2004-2005	3 ( )	(-)	(-)	(-)	(-)	(-)	(-)	3 ( )	1
21	(Georgia (country)) Giorgi Kakhelishvili	2010-2011	(-)	(-)	(-)	(-)	(-)	3 ( )	(-)	3 ( )	1
21	(Spain) Albert Yagüe	2011-2012	(-)	(-)	(-)	(-)	(-)	3 (6)	(-)	3 (6)	0.5
21	(Georgia (country)) Levan Shengelia	2018-2019	(-)	(-)	(-)	(-)	(-)	3 ( )	(-)	3 ( )	1
26	(Soviet Union) Levan Nodia	1968-1975	2 ( )	(-)	(-)	(-)	(-)	(-)	(-)	2 ( )	1
26	(Soviet Union) Manuchar Machaidze	1967-1980	1 ( )	1 ( )	(-)	(-)	(-)	(-)	(-)	2 ( )	1
26	(Georgia (country)) Georgi Kinkladze	1991-1995	2 ( )	(-)	(-)	(-)	(-)	(-)	(-)	2 ( )	1
26	(Georgia (country)) Giorgi Kiknadze	1993-1998	1 ( )	(-)	(-)	1 ( )	(-)	(-)	(-)	2 ( )	1
26	(Georgia (country)) Gocha Jamarauli	1990-1996, 2005	2 ( )	(-)	(-)	(-)	(-)	(-)	(-)	2 ( )	1
26	(Georgia (country)) Zaza Zirakishvili	1992-1993, 1998-2002	(-)	(-)	(-)	(-)	2 ( )	(-)	(-)	2 ( )	1
26	(Georgia (country)) Giorgi Shashiashvili	1996-2005, 2006, 2012	2 ( )	(-)	(-)	(-)	(-)	(-)	(-)	2 ( )	1
26	(Georgia (country)) Giorgi Anchabadze	1992-1997, 1999-2000, 2002-2004	1 ( )	(-)	(-)	1 ( )	(-)	(-)	(-)	2 ( )	1
26	(Georgia (country)) Vladimir Akhalaia	2002-2006, 2011-2012	2 ( )	(-)	(-)	(-)	(-)	(-)	(-)	2 ( )	1
26	(Georgia (country)) Jaba Kankava	2003-2004	2 ( )	(-)	(-)	(-)	(-)	(-)	(-)	2 ( )	1
26	(Georgia (country)) Davit Kvirkvelia	2002-2004, 2013-2014	2 ( )	(-)	(-)	(-)	(-)	(-)	(-)	2 ( )	1
26	(Georgia (country)) Sandro Iashvili	2003-2004, 2005-2007	(-)	(-)	(-)	1 ( )	1 ( )	(-)	(-)	2 ( )	1
26	(Georgia (country)) Shota Grigalashvili	2004-2006	(-)	(-)	(-)	(-)	2 ( )	(-)	(-)	2 ( )	1
26	(Georgia (country)) Guram Kashia	2006-2010	(-)	(-)	(-)	1 ( )	(-)	1 ( )	(-)	2 ( )	1
26	(Georgia (country)) Aleksandre Koshkadze	2008-2012	(-)	(-)	(-)	(-)	(-)	2 ( )	(-)	2 ( )	1
26	(Georgia (country)) David Odikadze	2004-2008, 2011-2013	(-)	(-)	(-)	1 ( )	(-)	1 ( )	(-)	2 ( )	1
26	(Georgia (country)) Irakli Lekvtadze	2010-2014	(-)	(-)	(-)	(-)	(-)	2 ( )	(-)	2 ( )	1
26	(Ivory Coast) Dijilly Vouho	2013-2015	(-)	(-)	(-)	2 (6)	(-)	0 (2)	(-)	2 (8)	0.25
26	(Spain) Ustaritz Aldekoaotalora	2013-2014	(-)	(-)	(-)	2 (4)	(-)	(-)	(-)	2 (4)	0.5
26	(Georgia (country)) Jaba Jighauri	2011-2016	(-)	(-)	(-)	1 ( )	(-)	1 ( )	(-)	2 ( )	1
26	(Georgia (country)) Budu Zivzivadze	2012-2014, 2018	(-)	(-)	(-)	(-)	(-)	2 ( )	(-)	2 ( )	1
26	(Georgia (country)) Giorgi Kukhianidze	2019-2021	(-)	(-)	(-)	(-)	(-)	2 ( )	(-)	2 ( )	1
26	(Georgia (country)) Levan Kutalia	2019	(-)	(-)	(-)	(-)	(-)	2 ( )	(-)	2 ( )	1
26	(Georgia (country)) Davit Skhirtladze	2020, 2021-2024	(-)	(-)	(-)	0 (2)	(-)	(-)	2 (6)	2 (8)	0.25
26	(Serbia) Zoran Marušić	2021, 2023	(-)	(-)	(-)	1 (3)	(-)	(-)	1 (4)	2 (7)	0.29
26	(Georgia (country)) Nika Ninua	2016-2020, 2024-Present	(-)	(-)	(-)	(-)	(-)	1 (8)	1 (4)	2 (12)	0.17
26	(Georgia (country)) Nikoloz Ugrekhelidze	2023-Present	(-)	(-)	(-)	0 (-)	(-)	(-)	2 (4)	2 (4)	0.5
26	(Brazil) Léo Santos	2026-Present	(-)	(-)	(-)	0 (-)	(-)	(-)	2 (4)	2 (4)	0.33
53	(Soviet Union) Gocha Gavasheli	1965, 1967-1976	1 ( )	(-)	(-)	(-)	(-)	(-)	(-)	1 ( )	1
53	(Soviet Union) Vakhtang Chelidze	1965-1977	1 ( )	(-)	(-)	(-)	(-)	(-)	(-)	1 ( )	1
53	(Soviet Union) Zurab Tsereteli	1971-1977	1 ( )	(-)	(-)	(-)	(-)	(-)	(-)	1 ( )	1
53	(Soviet Union) Kakhi Asatiani	1965-1975	1 ( )	(-)	(-)	(-)	(-)	(-)	(-)	1 ( )	1
53	(Soviet Union) Zorbeg Ebralidze	1971-1976	1 ( )	(-)	(-)	(-)	(-)	(-)	(-)	1 ( )	1
53	(Soviet Union) Piruz Kanteladze	1967-1980	(-)	1 ( )	(-)	(-)	(-)	(-)	(-)	1 ( )	1
53	(Soviet Union) Giorgi Chilaia	1976-1982, 1984	(-)	1 ( )	(-)	(-)	(-)	(-)	(-)	1 ( )	1
53	(Soviet Union) Vazha Zhvania	1980-1985, 1987, 1991-1992	(-)	1 ( )	(-)	(-)	(-)	(-)	(-)	1 ( )	1
53	(Soviet Union) Nodar Khizanishvili	1973-1982	1 ( )	(-)	(-)	(-)	(-)	(-)	(-)	1 ( )	1
53	(Soviet Union) Gia Guruli	1982-1988	1 ( )	(-)	(-)	(-)	(-)	(-)	(-)	1 ( )	1
53	(Soviet Union) Soso Chedia	1983-1990	1 ( )	(-)	(-)	(-)	(-)	(-)	(-)	1 ( )	1
53	(Georgia (country)) Gela Inalishvili	1991-1997	(-)	(-)	(-)	1 ( )	(-)	(-)	(-)	1 ( )	1
53	(Georgia (country)) Mikheil Kavelashvili	1988-1995	1 ( )	(-)	(-)	(-)	(-)	(-)	(-)	1 ( )	1
53	(Georgia (country)) Revaz Arveladze	1989-1994, 2000	1 ( )	(-)	(-)	(-)	(-)	(-)	(-)	1 ( )	1
53	(Georgia (country)) Giorgi Demetradze	1994-1998	1 ( )	(-)	(-)	(-)	(-)	(-)	(-)	1 ( )	1
53	(Georgia (country)) Roin Kerdzevadze	1988-1990, 1995-1998	1 ( )	(-)	(-)	(-)	(-)	(-)	(-)	1 ( )	1
53	(Georgia (country)) Rati Aleksidze	1996-1999, 2002-2003	1 ( )	(-)	(-)	(-)	(-)	(-)	(-)	1 ( )	1
53	(Georgia (country)) Mikheil Ashvetia	1997-2000	(-)	(-)	(-)	1 ( )	(-)	(-)	(-)	1 ( )	1
53	(Georgia (country)) Levan Tskitishvili	1993-1998	(-)	(-)	(-)	1 ( )	(-)	(-)	(-)	1 ( )	1
53	(Georgia (country)) Klimenti Tsitaishvili	1998, 1999-2000	(-)	(-)	(-)	1 ( )	(-)	(-)	(-)	1 ( )	1
53	(Turkmenistan) Kakha Gogoladze	2000	(-)	(-)	(-)	(-)	1 (2)	(-)	(-)	1 (2)	0.5
53	(Georgia (country)) Akaki Mikuchadze	2000-2002, 2005-2006	1 ( )	(-)	(-)	(-)	(-)	(-)	(-)	1 ( )	1
53	(Brazil) Carlos Alberto	2001-2004	1 (4)	(-)	(-)	0 (2)	(-)	(-)	(-)	1 (6)	0.17
53	(Georgia (country)) Boris Goncharov	1998, 2000, 2004, 2008	1 ( )	(-)	(-)	(-)	(-)	(-)	(-)	1 ( )	1
53	(Brazil) César Romero	2004-2005	1 ( )	(-)	(-)	(-)	(-)	(-)	(-)	1 ( )	1
53	(Georgia (country)) Kakhaber Aladashvili	2004-2006	1 ( )	(-)	(-)	(-)	(-)	(-)	(-)	1 ( )	1
53	(Georgia (country)) Georgi Nemsadze	1989-1995, 2000, 2004-2005	1 ( )	(-)	(-)	(-)	(-)	(-)	(-)	1 ( )	1
53	(Georgia (country)) Sergi Orbeladze	2005-2006	(-)	(-)	(-)	1 ( )	(-)	(-)	(-)	1 ( )	1
53	(Brazil) Rodrigo Tornin	2006-2007	(-)	(-)	(-)	(-)	1 (1)	(-)	(-)	1 (1)	1
53	(Georgia (country)) Mikheil Khutsishvili	1997, 2000, 2001, 2006-2008	(-)	(-)	(-)	(-)	1 ( )	(-)	(-)	1 ( )	1
53	(Georgia (country)) Mikheil Bobokhidze	2001-2004, 2005-2007	(-)	(-)	(-)	(-)	1 ( )	(-)	(-)	1 ( )	1
53	(Georgia (country)) David Gigauri	2005-2007	(-)	(-)	(-)	(-)	1 ( )	(-)	(-)	1 ( )	1
53	(Gabon) Georges Akieremy	2007-2010	1 (4)	(-)	(-)	0 (2)	(-)	0 (3)	(-)	1 (9)	0.11
53	(Georgia (country)) Oleg Gvelesiani	2007-2009	0 (0)	(-)	(-)	1 (4)	(-)	(-)	(-)	1 (4)	0.25
53	(Georgia (country)) Nikoloz Pirtskhalava	2004-2012	0 (1)	(-)	(-)	0 (4)	0 (0)	1 (9)	(-)	1 (13)	0.08
53	(Spain) Carles Coto	2011-2013	(-)	(-)	(-)	(-)	(-)	1 (5)	(-)	1 (5)	0.2
53	(Georgia (country)) Nika Kvekveskiri	2011-2014	(-)	(-)	(-)	(-)	(-)	1 (7)	(-)	1 (7)	0.14
53	(Georgia (country)) Elgujja Grigalashvili	2013-2014	(-)	(-)	(-)	1 (6)	(-)	0 (2)	(-)	1 (8)	0.13
53	(North Macedonia) Darko Glishikj	2012-2014	(-)	(-)	(-)	1 (3)	(-)	0 (2)	(-)	1 (5)	0.2
53	(Georgia (country)) Giorgi Papunashvili	2013-2017	(-)	(-)	(-)	0 (4)	(-)	1 (4)	(-)	1 (8)	0.13
53	(Georgia (country)) Otar Kiteishvili	2013-2018	(-)	(-)	(-)	1 (4)	(-)	0 (6)	(-)	1 (10)	0.1
53	(Georgia (country)) Giorgi Kvilitaia	2015-2016	(-)	(-)	(-)	1 (2)	(-)	0 (2)	(-)	1 (4)	0.25
53	(Georgia (country)) Nodar Kavtaradze	2019-2021, 2021	(-)	(-)	(-)	0 (2)	(-)	1 (8)	0 (2)	1 (12)	0.08
53	(Georgia (country)) Giorgi Zaria	2015-2020	(-)	(-)	(-)	(-)	(-)	1 (4)	(-)	1 (4)	0.25
53	(France) Abdeljalil Medioub	2019	(-)	(-)	(-)	(-)	(-)	1 (2)	(-)	1 (2)	0.5
53	(Senegal) Arfang Daffé	2019-2020	(-)	(-)	(-)	(-)	(-)	1 (4)	(-)	1 (4)	0.25
53	(Ghana) Kwame Karikari	2019-2020	(-)	(-)	(-)	(-)	(-)	1 (3)	(-)	1 (3)	0.33
53	(Georgia (country)) Giorgi Gabedava	2020-2022	(-)	(-)	(-)	0 (3)	(-)	1 (2)	0 (3)	1 (8)	0.13
53	(Brazil) Pernambuco	2020	(-)	(-)	(-)	0 (1)	(-)	1 (2)	(-)	1 (3)	0.33
53	(Serbia) Milan Radin	2021	(-)	(-)	(-)	1 (2)	(-)	(-)	0 (2)	1 (4)	0.25
53	(Georgia (country)) Giorgi Papava	2011-2015, 2019-2022	(-)	(-)	(-)	0 (7)	(-)	0 (8)	1 (2)	1 (17)	0.06
53	(Ghana) Barnes Osei	2021-2023	(-)	(-)	(-)	0 (4)	(-)	(-)	1 (6)	1 (10)	0.1
53	(Georgia (country)) Levan Kharabadze	2018-2022	(-)	(-)	(-)	0 (2)	(-)	0 (2)	1 (4)	1 (8)	0.13
53	(Belarus) Dmitry Antilevsky	2022	(-)	(-)	(-)	(-)	(-)	(-)	1 (1)	1 (1)	1
53	(Georgia (country)) Gabriel Sigua	2022-2023	(-)	(-)	(-)	1 (2)	(-)	(-)	(-)	1 (2)	0.5
53	(Guinea) Ousmane Camara	2022-2023	(-)	(-)	(-)	1 (2)	(-)	(-)	0 (4)	1 (6)	0.17
53	(Georgia (country)) Vakhtang Salia	2023-2025	(-)	(-)	(-)	0 (-)	(-)	(-)	1 (2)	1 (2)	0.5
53	Own goal	1972-	0 (66)	0 (21)	0 (4)	0 (37)	0 (6)	1 (34)	0 (8)	1 (176)	0.01
53	(Guinea) Algassime Bah	2026-Present	(-)	(-)	(-)	0 (-)	(-)	(-)	1 (4)	1 (4)	0.25
53	(Bosnia and Herzegovina) Numan Kurdić	2026-Present	(-)	(-)	(-)	0 (-)	(-)	(-)	1 (4)	1 (4)	0.25

=== Clean Sheets ===
As of match played 30 July 2026

	Name	Years	UEFA Cup	UEFA Cup Winners' Cup	European Cup	UEFA Champions League	UEFA Intertoto Cup	UEFA Europa League	UEFA Conference League	Total	Ratio
1	(Soviet Union) Otar Gabelia	1977-1982; 1985-1990	3 (11)	8 (17)	1 (4)	(-)	(-)	(-)	(-)	12 (32)	0.38
2	(Georgia (country)) Irakli Zoidze	1992-1998; 2002-2006	9 (25)	(-)	(-)	2 (8)	(-)	(-)	(-)	11 (33)	0.33
3	(Georgia (country)) Giorgi Loria	2005-2014; 2023-2024; 2025-Present	0 (2)	(-)	(-)	0 (8)	1 (2)	5 (20)	1 (6)	7 (38)	0.18
4	(Soviet Union) Davit Gogia	1968; 1972-1979	4 (15)	1 (4)	(-)	(-)	(-)	(-)	(-)	5 (19)	0.26
5	(Gabon) Didier Ovono	2007-2009	2 (3)	(-)	(-)	2 (4)	(-)	(-)	(-)	4 (7)	0.57
5	(Spain) José Perales	2019-2020	(-)	(-)	(-)	(-)	(-)	4 (6)	(-)	4 (6)	0.67
7	(Georgia (country)) Gela Chanturia	1987-1988; 1995-1998	1 (3)	(-)	(-)	0 (0)	(-)	(-)	(-)	1 (3)	0.33
7	(Georgia (country)) Ramaz Sogolashvili	1998-1999	(-)	(-)	(-)	1 (2)	(-)	(-)	(-)	1 (2)	0.5
7	(Georgia (country)) Zurab Mamaladze	2000-2002; 2004-2005	1 (5)	(-)	(-)	(-)	(-)	(-)	(-)	1 (5)	0.2
7	(Georgia (country)) Zviad Sturua	2005-2006	(-)	(-)	(-)	1 (4)	(-)	(-)	(-)	1 (4)	0.25
7	(Georgia (country)) Davit Gvaramadze	1991-1994; 1998-1999; 2002-2004	0 (4)	(-)	(-)	1 (3)	(-)	(-)	(-)	1 (7)	0.14
7	(France) Anthony Scribe	2016	(-)	(-)	(-)	1 (4)	(-)	0 (2)	(-)	1 (6)	0.17
7	(Georgia (country)) Roin Kvaskhvadze	2020-2021	(-)	(-)	(-)	0 (3)	(-)	1 (2)	(-)	1 (5)	0.2
14	(Georgia (country)) Nikoloz Chkheidze	1991-1995; 1999-2000	0 (1)	(-)	(-)	0 (0)	(-)	(-)	(-)	0 (1)	0
14	(Belgium) Daniël D'Hondt	1999	(-)	(-)	(-)	0 (2)	(-)	(-)	(-)	0 (2)	0
14	(Georgia (country)) Soso Grishikashvili	1999-2002; 2006-2008; 2011-2012	0 (2)	(-)	(-)	(-)	0 (4)	(-)	(-)	0 (6)	0
14	(Slovakia) Libor Hrdlička	2015-2016	(-)	(-)	(-)	(-)	(-)	0 (2)	(-)	0 (2)	0
14	(Georgia (country)) Demetre Buliskeria	2018	(-)	(-)	(-)	(-)	(-)	0 (2)	(-)	0 (2)	0
14	(Georgia (country)) Omar Migineishvili	2013-2014; 2020-2021	(-)	(-)	(-)	(-)	(-)	(-)	0 (2)	0 (2)	0
14	(Spain) Andrés Prieto	2021-2022	(-)	(-)	(-)	(-)	(-)	(-)	0 (2)	0 (2)	0
14	(Georgia (country)) Mikheil Makatsaria	2022-Present	(-)	(-)	(-)	(-)	(-)	(-)	0 (2)	0 (2)	0

== Overall record ==
=== By competition ===
As of match played 30 July 2026

Competition	GP	W	D	L	GF	GA	+/-
UEFA Cup	66	29	10	27	83	102	-19
UEFA Cup Winners' Cup	21	11	3	7	30	17	+13
European Cup	4	1	0	3	7	8	–1
UEFA Champions League	37	13	5	19	45	53	-8
UEFA Intertoto Cup	6	2	2	2	12	8	+4
UEFA Europa League	34	16	5	13	49	50	-1
UEFA Conference League	12	3	2	7	17	26	-9
Total	180	75	27	78	243	264	-21

=== By country ===
As of match played 30 July 2026

Country	Pld	W	D	L	GF	GA	GD	Win%
Albania	5	2	0	3	7	8	−1	40.00
Andorra	2	2	0	0	7	0	+7	100.00
Armenia	4	3	1	0	11	2	+9	75.00
Austria	10	2	2	6	8	22	−14	20.00
Azerbaijan	6	3	0	3	9	7	+2	50.00
Belarus	6	4	1	1	8	8	+0	66.67
Belgium	4	0	2	2	3	5	−2	0.00
Bulgaria	6	2	0	4	8	8	+0	33.33
Croatia	2	0	0	2	0	3	−3	0.00
Czech Republic	4	1	0	3	5	7	−2	25.00
Denmark	4	2	0	2	7	7	+0	50.00
England	9	2	1	6	10	20	−10	22.22
Estonia	8	5	1	2	13	7	+6	62.50
Faroe Islands	5	3	0	2	13	9	+4	60.00
France	3	1	1	1	4	4	+0	33.33
Germany	8	2	1	5	8	17	−9	25.00
Greece	9	1	3	5	5	15	−10	11.11
Hungary	2	0	0	2	1	5	−4	0.00
Iceland	2	2	0	0	6	1	+5	100.00
Ireland	2	2	0	0	5	0	+5	100.00
Israel	2	0	0	2	2	7	−5	0.00
Italy	6	3	2	1	6	3	+3	50.00
Kazakhstan	4	0	1	3	2	7	−5	0.00
Latvia	2	1	0	1	4	3	+1	50.00
Liechtenstein	2	1	1	0	2	0	+2	50.00
Lithuania	2	1	0	1	5	7	−2	50.00
Luxembourg	4	2	2	0	9	4	+5	50.00
Malta	2	0	0	2	1	3	−2	0.00
Moldova	4	3	0	1	7	4	+3	75.00
Montenegro	2	0	1	1	2	3	−1	0.00
Netherlands	8	2	1	5	7	17	−10	25.00
Northern Ireland	4	3	1	0	11	4	+7	75.00
Norway	2	1	1	0	2	1	+1	50.00
Poland	4	3	0	1	7	5	+2	75.00
Portugal	5	1	0	4	1	14	−13	20.00
Romania	6	3	2	1	7	5	+2	50.00
Russia	2	1	1	0	2	1	+1	50.00
Serbia	2	1	0	1	4	5	−1	50.00
Slovakia	2	0	1	1	2	3	−1	0.00
Spain	2	1	0	1	2	2	+0	50.00
Sweden	2	2	0	0	4	2	+2	100.00
Switzerland	2	1	0	1	1	4	−3	50.00
Wales	5	3	0	2	10	3	+7	60.00
Former nations:
East Germany	1	1	0	0	2	1	+1	100.00
Yugoslavia	2	2	0	0	8	1	+7	100.00

=== By club ===
As of match played 30 July 2026

Opponent	Played	Won	Drawn	Lost	For	Against	Difference	Ratio
(Albania) Tirana	3	1	0	2	3	5	−2	33.33
(Albania) Vllaznia Shkodër	2	1	0	1	4	3	+1	50.00
(Andorra) Engordany	2	2	0	0	7	0	+7	100.00
(Armenia) Alashkert	2	1	1	0	3	1	+2	50.00
(Armenia) Kilikia	2	2	0	0	8	1	+7	100.00
(Austria) Grazer AK	2	1	1	0	4	2	+2	50.00
(Austria) Rapid Wien	2	0	0	2	0	8	−8	0.00
(Austria) SV Ried	2	0	0	2	1	4	−3	0.00
(Austria) Tirol Innsbruck	2	1	0	1	2	5	−3	50.00
(Austria) Sturm Graz	2	0	1	1	1	3	−2	0.00
(Azerbaijan) Gabala	4	3	0	1	7	3	+4	75.00
(Azerbaijan) Neftçi	2	0	0	2	2	4	−2	0.00
(Belarus) BATE Borisov	4	3	0	1	6	7	−1	75.00
(Belarus) Slavia Mozyr	2	1	1	0	2	1	+1	50.00
(Belgium) Standard Liège	4	0	2	2	3	5	−2	0.00
(Bulgaria) Botev Plovdiv	2	0	0	2	0	2	−2	0.00
(Bulgaria) Lokomotiv Sofia	2	1	0	1	4	3	+1	50.00
(Bulgaria) Slavia Sofia	2	1	0	1	4	3	+1	50.00
(Croatia) Dinamo Zagreb	2	0	0	2	0	3	−3	0.00
(Czech Republic) Slavia Prague	2	1	0	1	3	3	+0	50.00
(Czech Republic) Slovan Liberec	2	0	0	2	2	4	−2	0.00
(Denmark) Brøndby	2	0	0	2	1	5	−4	0.00
(Denmark) KB	2	2	0	0	6	2	+4	100.00
(East Germany) Carl Zeiss Jena	1	1	0	0	2	1	+1	100.00
(England) Liverpool	2	1	0	1	4	2	+2	50.00
(England) Newcastle United	1	0	0	1	0	2	−2	0.00
(England) Tottenham Hotspur	4	0	1	3	2	14	−12	0.00
(England) West Ham United	2	1	0	1	4	2	+2	50.00
(Estonia) Flora Tallinn	2	1	1	0	2	1	+1	50.00
(Estonia) Levadia Tallinn	2	1	0	1	2	1	+1	50.00
(Estonia) Paide Linnameeskond	2	1	0	1	4	4	+0	50.00
(Estonia) TVMK Tallinn	2	2	0	0	5	1	+4	100.00
(Faroe Islands) EB/Streymur	2	2	0	0	9	2	+7	100.00
(Faroe Islands) KÍ	1	0	0	1	1	6	−5	0.00
(Faroe Islands) NSÍ Runavík	2	1	0	1	3	1	+2	50.00
(France) Bastia	2	1	1	0	4	2	+2	50.00
(France) Sochaux-Montbéliard	1	0	0	1	0	2	−2	0.00
(Germany) Bayer Leverkusen	2	1	0	1	2	6	−4	50.00
(Germany) Hamburg	2	0	0	2	3	6	−3	0.00
(Germany) Hertha BSC	2	1	0	1	1	2	−1	50.00
(Germany) Werder Bremen	2	0	1	1	2	3	−1	0.00
(Greece) AEK Athens	2	0	1	1	1	2	−1	0.00
(Greece) Kastoria	2	1	1	0	2	0	+2	50.00
(Greece) Panathinaikos	2	0	1	1	0	3	−3	0.00
(Greece) Panionios	1	0	0	1	2	5	−3	0.00
(Greece) PAOK	2	0	0	2	0	5	−5	0.00
(Hungary) MTK Budapest	2	0	0	2	1	5	−4	0.00
(Iceland) KR	2	2	0	0	6	1	+5	100.00
(Republic of Ireland) Waterford	2	2	0	0	5	0	+5	100.00
(Israel) Maccabi Haifa	2	0	0	2	2	7	−5	0.00
(Italy) Inter Milan	2	1	1	0	1	0	+1	50.00
(Italy) Napoli	4	2	1	1	5	3	+2	50.00
(Kazakhstan) Aktobe	2	0	0	2	0	3	−3	0.00
(Kazakhstan) Astana	2	0	1	1	2	3	−1	0.00
(Latvia) Liepājas Metalurgs	2	1	0	1	4	3	+1	50.00
(Liechtenstein) Vaduz	2	1	1	0	2	0	+2	50.00
(Lithuania) Žalgiris	2	1	0	1	5	7	−2	50.00
(Luxembourg) Grevenmacher	2	1	1	0	6	2	+4	50.00
(Luxembourg) Mondorf-les-Bains	2	1	1	0	3	2	+1	50.00
(Malta) Ħamrun Spartans	2	0	0	2	1	3	−2	0.00
(Moldova) Milsami Orhei	2	2	0	0	5	1	+4	100.00
(Moldova) Zimbru Chișinău	2	1	0	1	2	3	−1	50.00
(Montenegro) Mornar	2	0	1	1	2	3	−1	0.00
(Netherlands) Feyenoord	4	1	1	2	4	7	−3	25.00
(Netherlands) Twente	2	1	0	1	3	4	−1	50.00
(Netherlands) Willem II	2	0	0	2	0	6	−6	0.00
(Northern Ireland) Crusaders	2	2	0	0	8	2	+6	100.00
(Northern Ireland) Linfield	2	1	1	0	3	2	+1	50.00
(Norway) Molde	2	1	1	0	2	1	+1	50.00
(Poland) Legia Warsaw	2	2	0	0	2	0	+2	100.00
(Poland) Wisła Kraków	2	1	0	1	5	5	+0	50.00
(Portugal) Boavista	2	1	0	1	1	5	−4	50.00
(Portugal) SC Braga	2	0	0	2	0	5	−5	0.00
(Portugal) Sporting CP	1	0	0	1	0	4	−4	0.00
(Romania) FCSB	2	0	1	1	1	3	−2	0.00
(Romania) U Craiova	2	2	0	0	4	1	+3	100.00
(Romania) Victoria București	2	1	1	0	2	1	+1	50.00
(Russia) Torpedo Moscow	2	1	1	0	2	1	+1	50.00
(Serbia) Red Star Belgrade	2	1	0	1	4	5	−1	50.00
(Slovakia) DAC 1904	2	0	1	1	2	3	−1	0.00
(Spain) Athletic Bilbao	2	1	0	1	2	2	+0	50.00
(Sweden) Gefle	2	2	0	0	4	2	+2	100.00
(Switzerland) Grasshopper Zürich	2	1	0	1	1	4	−3	50.00
(Socialist Federal Republic of Yugoslavia) OFK Beograd	2	2	0	0	8	1	+7	100.00
(Wales) Cardiff City	2	1	0	1	3	1	+2	50.00
(Wales) Connah's Quay Nomads	1	1	0	0	1	0	+1	100.00
(Wales) Llanelli Town	2	1	0	1	6	2	+4	50.00
