= Bakar Kardava =

Georgian footballer (born 1994)

Personal information
- Date of birth: 4 November 1994 (age 32)
- Place of birth: Senaki, Georgia
- Height: 1.85 m (6 ft 1 in)
- Position: Midfielder

Team information
- Current team: Iberia 1999
- Number: 8

Senior career*
Years	Team	Apps	(Gls)
2012–2013	Sasco	21	(1)
2013–2014	Gagra	31	(3)
2015–2016	Tskhinvali	51	(1)
2017–2021	Dinamo Tbilisi	109	(5)
2022–	Iberia 1999	152	(7)
- * Club domestic league appearances and goals as of 17 August 2026

Bakar Kardava (Georgian: ბაქარ ქარდავა; born 4 November 1994) is a Georgian professional footballer who plays as a defendive midfielder for Erovnuli Liga club Iberia 1999.

Kardava is the four-time winner of the Erovnuli Liga. He has also won the Supercup and national cup. Kardava was twice selected in Team of the Year individually.

== Career ==
Kardava started his career at 2nd division club Sasco in 2012. A year later, he moved to Gagra. In 2015, Tskhinvali became the first top-flight club Kardava signed for. He made a debut in UEFA European club competitions against Romanian side Botoșani on 2 July 2015.

At the end of the 2016 season, Kardava moved to Dinamo Tbilisi where he twice won the league title during the next five seasons.

In 2022, Kardava joined the national cup holders Saburtalo and broke his own record by taking part in 44 games across all competitions. In 2024, he not only lifted the Champion's Shield for the third time but also received an individual recognition by being included in Erovnuli Liga Team of the Year by the Georgian Football Federation.

On 8 July 2026, Kardava scored his first European goal, helping his team to snatch a 3–2 away win over Estonian champions Flora in a UEFA Champions League qualifier.

== Career statistics ==
As of 15 August 2026

Appearances and goals by club, season and competition
Club	Season	League			Georgian Cup		European		Other		Total	
Club	Season	Division	Apps	Goals	Apps	Goals	Apps	Goals	Apps	Goals	Apps	Goals
Sasco	2012–13	Pirveli Liga	21	1	—		—		—		21	1
Gagra	2013–14	Pirveli Liga	17	2	2	0	—		—		19	2
Gagra	2014–15	Pirveli Liga	14	1	1	0	—		—		15	1
Gagra	Total		31	3	3	0	0	0	0	0	34	3
Tskhinvali	2014–15	Umaglesi Liga	12	0	4	0	—		—		16	0
Tskhinvali	2015–16	Umaglesi Liga	27	0	2	0	2 (Note: Appearances in UEFA Europa League)	0	—		31	0
Tskhinvali	2016	Umaglesi Liga	12	1	—		—		—		12	1
Tskhinvali	Total		51	1	6	0	2	0	0	0	59	1
Dinamo Tbilisi	2017	Erovnuli Liga	32	2	4	0	—		—		36	2
Dinamo Tbilisi	2018	Erovnuli Liga	16	0	1	0	1	0	—		18	0
Dinamo Tbilisi	2019	Erovnuli Liga	21	1	2	0	5	0	—		28	1
Dinamo Tbilisi	2020	Erovnuli Liga	10	1	—		3 (Note: One appearance in UEFA Champions League, two appearances in UEFA Europa League)	0	1 (Note: Appearance(s) in Georgian Super Cup)	0	14	1
Dinamo Tbilisi	2021	Erovnuli Liga	30	1	1	0	4 (Note: Two appearances in UEFA Champions League, two appearances in UEFA Conference League)	0	1	0	36	1
Dinamo Tbilisi	Total		109	5	8	0	13	0	2	0	132	5
Iberia 1999	2022	Erovnuli Liga	36	2	3	0	4 (Note: Appearances in UEFA Conference League)	0	1	0	44	2
Iberia 1999	2023	Erovnuli Liga	32	0	4	0	—		—		36	0
Iberia 1999	2024	Erovnuli Liga	33	3	1	0	4	0	2	0	40	3
Iberia 1999	2025	Erovnuli Liga	33	1	3	0	4 (Note: Two appearances in UEFA Champions League, two appearances in UEFA Conference League)	0	2	0	42	1
Iberia 1999	2026	Erovnuli Liga	18	1	2	0	6 (Note: 4 appearances in UEFA Champions League, two appearances in UEFA Europa League)	1	2	0	28	2
Iberia 1999	Total		152	7	13	0	18	1	7	0	190	8
Career total			364	17	30	0	33	1	9	0	436	18

== Honours ==
Dinamo Tbilisi

- Erovnuli Liga: 2019, 2020
- Georgian Super Cup: 2021

Iberia 1999

- Georgian Cup: 2023
- Erovnuli Liga: 2024, 2025

Individual

- Erovnuli Liga Team of the Year: 2024, 2025
