= Nodar Iashvili =

Georgian association football player (born 1993)

Personal information
- Date of birth: 24 January 1993 (age 33)
- Place of birth: Georgia
- Height: 1.80 m (5 ft 11 in)
- Position: Defender

Team information
- Current team: Guria
- Number: 24

Youth career
- Norchi Dinamo

Senior career*
Years	Team	Apps	(Gls)
2012–2014	WIT Georgia	9	(1)
2014–2018	Saburtalo	96	(1)
2019–2021	Dinamo Tbilisi	55	(1)
2022	Saburtalo	8	(0)
2022	Locomotive	17	(0)
2023	Gonio	26	(0)
2024–2025	Sioni	69	(1)
2026–	Guria	26	(1)
- * Club domestic league appearances and goals as of 3 November 2026

Nodar Iashvili (Georgian: ნოდარ იაშვილი, born 24 January 1993) is a Georgian footballer who plays as a right back for Liga 3 club Guria.

Iashvili is the three-time winner of the Erovnuli Liga. He has also won the Georgian Super Cup.

== Career ==
Nodar Iashvili started his professional career at WIT Georgia, making his debut in an away 2–0 loss to Merani Martvili on 6 April 2013. Later in the same year, Iashvili netted his first top-tier goal in a 5–0 win over Torpedo.

In 2014, Iashvili moved to Saburtalo in the 2nd division. Having won promotion to the Umaglesi Liga in the same season, Saburtalo established itself as an ambitious club and after the fourth season secured the top league title as well.

During the next two years, Iashvili added two more champion's titles to his tally, although this time due to his three-year tenure at Dinamo Tbilisi which began in 2019. This trophy-laden period lasted until February 2021, when Dinamo defeated Gagra on penalties to claim the Super Cup.

In early 2022, Iashvili returned to Saburtalo for a half season and later in the summer moved to Locomotive on a 1,5 year-long deal.

In February 2023, Gonio announced that they completed a shock transfer deal with the three-time champion now joining the Liga 4 club. The team managed to win the league to advance further into Liga 3, although the sides parted ways and Iashvili moved to 2nd division club Sioni.

Iashvili took part in all 36 league games in addition to two promotion play-off ties, but Sioni failed to beat Gagra on penalties after a 3–3 aggregate score. After this season his existing contract with the club was extended.

In January 2026, Iashvili moved to Liga 3 side Guria.

== Statistics ==
As of match played 30 October 2026

Appearances and goals by club, season and competition
Club	Season	League			National cup		Continental		Other		Total	
Club	Season	Division	Apps	Goals	Apps	Goals	Apps	Goals	Apps	Goals	Apps	Goals
WIT Georgia	2012–13	Umaglesi Liga	4	0	–		–		–		4	0
WIT Georgia	2013–14	Umaglesi Liga	5	1	1	0	–		–		6	1
WIT Georgia	Total		9	1	1	0	0	0	0	0	10	1
Saburtalo	2014–15	Pirveli Liga	27	0	2	0	–		–		29	0
Saburtalo	2015–16	Umaglesi Liga	22	1	1	0	–		–		23	1
Saburtalo	2016	Umaglesi Liga	14	0	–		–		–		14	0
Saburtalo	2017	Erovnuli Liga	18	0	–		–		–		18	0
Saburtalo	2018	Erovnuli Liga	15	0	–		–		–		15	0
Dinamo Tbilisi	2019	Erovnuli Liga	33	0	2	0	3 (Note: Appearances in UEFA Europa League)	0	–		38	0
Dinamo Tbilisi	2020	Erovnuli Liga	15	1	–		3 (Note: Two appearances in UEFA Europa League and one appearance in UEFA Conference League)	0	–		18	1
Dinamo Tbilisi	2021	Erovnuli Liga	7	0	1	0	2 (Note: One appearance in UEFA Europa League and one appearance in UEFA Conference League)	0	1 (Note: Appearances in Georgian Super Cup)	0	11	0
Dinamo Tbilisi	Total		55	1	3	0	8	0	1	0	67	1
Saburtalo	2022 Erovnuli Liga	Erovnuli Liga	8	0	–		–		1	0	9	0
Saburtalo	Total		104	1	3	0	0	0	1	0	108	1
Locomotive	2022	Erovnuli Liga	17	0	2	0	–		–		19	0
Gonio	2023	Liga 4	26	0	1	0	–		–		27	0
Sioni	2024	Erovnuli Liga 2	36	1	1	0	–		2 (Note: Appearances in Erovnuli Liga playoffs)	0	39	1
Sioni	2025	Erovnuli Liga 2	33	0	–		–		–		33	0
Sioni	Total		69	1	1	0	0	0	2	0	72	1
Guria	2026	Liga 3	26	1	4	0	–		–		30	1
Career total			287	5	15	0	8	0	3	0	313	5

== Honours ==
Saburtalo

- Erovnuli Liga: 2018

Dinamo Tbilisi

- Erovnuli Liga: 2019, 2020
- Super Cup: 2021
