= Giorgi Kukhianidze =

Georgian footballer (born 1992)

Personal information
- Date of birth: 1 July 1992 (age 34)
- Place of birth: Kutaisi, Georgia
- Height: 1.80 m (5 ft 11 in)
- Position: Attacking midfielder

Team information
- Current team: Qizilqum
- Number: 77

Youth career
- –2011: Torpedo Kutaisi

Senior career*
Years	Team	Apps	(Gls)
2011–2014	Torpedo Kutaisi	68	(10)
2014	Zestaponi	4	(0)
2014–2015	Shukura Kobuleti	8	(0)
2015–2016	Torpedo Kutaisi	24	(7)
2016–2017	Locomotive Tbilisi	10	(0)
2017–2019	Torpedo Kutaisi	66	(15)
2019–2021	Dinamo Tbilisi	33	(2)
2021–2022	Qizilqum	26	(2)
2022–2023	Torpedo Kutaisi	37	(11)
2023–	Qizilqum	37	(3)
- * Club domestic league appearances and goals as of 8 January 2025

Giorgi Kukhianidze (Georgian: გიორგი კუხიანიძე; born 1 July 1992) is a Georgian professional footballer who plays as an attacking midfielder for Uzbekistan Super League club Qizilqum.

Kukhianidze is the three-time winner of the Georgian top league. He has also won the national cup and Supercup.

== Career ==
Kukhianidze started his career at his hometown club Torpedo Kutaisi where he had four spells in total. Being at one point the team captain, he won the champion's title and two cup trophies with Torpedo. In 2017, the player was named in Team of the Year.

In January 2019, Kukhianidze moved to Dinamo Tbilisi on a year-long deal, later extended to another year. With this club he added two more league titles to his tally.

In July 2023, Kukhianidze signed for Uzbekistani club Qizilqum on a free transfer.

== Career statistics ==
As of match played 30 November 2024

Appearances and goals by club, season and competition
Club	Season	League			National cup		Continental		Total	
Club	Season	Division	Apps	Goals	Apps	Goals	Apps	Goals	Apps	Goals
Torpedo Kutaisi	2009–10	Pirveli Liga	0	0	1	0	—		1	0
Torpedo Kutaisi	2010–11	Erovnuli Liga	0	0	0	0	—		0	0
Torpedo Kutaisi	2011–12	Erovnuli Liga	28	2	5	0	—		33	2
Torpedo Kutaisi	2012–13	Erovnuli Liga	31	7	0	0	1 (Note: Appearance(s) in UEFA Europa League)	0	32	7
Torpedo Kutaisi	2013–14	Erovnuli Liga	9	1	0	0	2 (Note: Appearance(s) in UEFA Europa League)	0	11	1
Torpedo Kutaisi	Total		68	10	6	0	3	0	77	10
Zestaponi	2013–14	Erovnuli Liga	4	0	0	0	—		4	0
Zestaponi	2014–15	Erovnuli Liga	0	0	0	0	2 (Note: Appearance(s) in UEFA Europa League)	0	2	0
Zestaponi	Total		4	0	0	0	2	0	6	0
Shukura Kobuleti	2014–15	Erovnuli Liga	8	0	2	0	—		10	0
Torpedo Kutaisi	2015–16	Erovnuli Liga	24	7	4	2	—		28	9
Locomotive Tbilisi	2016–17	Erovnuli Liga	10	0	1	0	—		11	0
Torpedo Kutaisi	2017–18	Erovnuli Liga	34	11	5	1	2	0	41	12
Torpedo Kutaisi	2018–19	Erovnuli Liga	32	4	5	0	8 (Note: 2 appearances in UEFA Champions League, 6 appearances in UEFA Europa League)	3 (Note: 1 goal in UEFA Champions League, 2 goals in UEFA Europa League)	45	7
Torpedo Kutaisi	Total		66	15	10	1	10	3	86	19
Dinamo Tbilisi	2019–20	Erovnuli Liga	23	1	2	0	5 (Note: Appearance(s) in UEFA Europa League)	2	30	3
Dinamo Tbilisi	2020–21	Erovnuli Liga	10	1	1	0	1 (Note: Appearance(s) in UEFA Europa League)	0	12	1
Dinamo Tbilisi	Total		33	2	3	0	6	2	42	4
Qizilqum	2021–22	Uzbekistan Super League	26	2	3	0	—		29	2
Torpedo Kutaisi	2022	Erovnuli Liga	29	9	5	1	—		34	10
Torpedo Kutaisi	2023	Erovnuli Liga	8	2	0	0	—		8	2
Torpedo Kutaisi	Total		37	11	5	1	—		42	12
Qizilqum	2023	Uzbekistan Super League	12	0	1	0	—		13	0
Qizilqum	2024	Uzbekistan Super League	25	3	—		—		25	3
Qizilqum	Total		37	3	1	0	0	0	38	3
Career total			313	50	35	4	21	5	369	59

== Honours ==
Torpedo Kutaisi

- Erovnuli Liga: 2017
- Georgian Cup: 2018, 2022
- Supercup: 2018

Dinamo Tbilisi

- Erovnuli Liga: 2019, 2020

Individual

- Erovnuli Liga Team of the Season: 2017
