= Zviad Sturua =

Georgian footballer

Personal information
- Full name: Zviad Sturua
- Date of birth: 25 April 1978 (age 48)
- Place of birth: Soviet Union
- Height: 1.91 m (6 ft 3 in)
- Position: Goalkeeper

Senior career*
Years	Team	Apps	(Gls)
1996–1998	Samtredia	38	(0)
1998	Samgurali Tskaltubo	8	(0)
1999	Torpedo Kutaisi	4	(0)
2000	Samgurali Tskaltubo	14	(0)
2000	TSU Tbilisi	7	(0)
2001	FC WIT Georgia	2	(0)
2001–2004	Torpedo Kutaisi	75	(0)
2005	FC Lokomotivi Tbilisi	14	(0)
2005–2006	FC Dinamo Tbilisi	16	(0)
2006	FC Chikhura Sachkhere	11	(0)
2007	FC Sioni Bolnisi	7	(0)
2008	FC Dinamo Batumi	8	(0)
2008–2009	FC Olimpi Rustavi	6	(0)
2009–2010	FC Sioni Bolnisi	1	(0)
2010	FC Gagra	5	(0)
2010–2011	FC Kolkheti-1913 Poti	0	(0)

International career
2005	Georgia	2	(0)
- * Club domestic league appearances and goals

Zviad Sturua (born 25 April 1978) is a retired Georgian international footballer. He was a goalkeeper.

In February 2005, he joined FC Lokomotivi Tbilisi. In summer 2005, he moved to FC Dinamo Tbilisi.
