= Nika Ninua =

Georgian association football player

Personal information
- Full name: Nikoloz Ninua
- Date of birth: 22 June 1999 (age 27)
- Place of birth: Tbilisi, Georgia
- Height: 1.86 m (6 ft 1 in)
- Position: Central midfielder

Team information
- Current team: Dinamo Tbilisi
- Number: 22

Youth career
- 2013–2016: Dinamo Tbilisi

Senior career*
Years	Team	Apps	(Gls)
2016–2020	Dinamo Tbilisi	96	(14)
2020–2024	PAOK	9	(1)
2021	→ Anorthosis (loan)	3	(0)
2022	→ Lamia (loan)	2	(0)
2022–2024	PAOK B	31	(0)
2024–	Dinamo Tbilisi	48	(5)

International career^{‡}
2014–2016	Georgia U17	10	(3)
2017	Georgia U19	4	(1)
2018–2019	Georgia U21	12	(0)
- * Club domestic league appearances and goals as of 10 December 2025 ‡ National team caps and goals as of 21 July 2021

Nika Ninua (Georgian: ნიკა ნინუა, romanized: nik'a ninua; born 22 June 1999) is a Georgian professional footballer who plays as a midfielder for Dinamo Tbilisi.

== Career ==
Ninua was born in Tbilisi on June 22, 1999. His talent stood out from an early age and he soon joined the youth academy at FC Dinamo Tbilisi, while at the same time from 2014 he became a Georgian international with his country's youth teams.

=== Dinamo Tbilisi ===
In November 2016 he was included in the first-team squad and began to find a role for himself. He made his debut soon afterwards, and by the end of that season he made 18 appearances, while on June 17, 2017, he scored his debut professional goal.

He gradually became integral in the squad and, despite his young age, he was selected the captain’s armband. His big breakthrough season came in the 2019 Erovnuli Liga, when he scored eight goals and provided 11 assists in 37 matches.

His overall record at Dinamo Tbilisi reads: 95 games, 14 goals, and 15 assists, while he also celebrated two Erovnuli Liga titles, and became a key member of the Georgia U21 team.

=== PAOK ===
On 14 August 2020, PAOK announced the signing of Ninua, until summer 2024. According to Georgian sources, the transfer fee paid to Dinamo Tbilisi was €850,000.

==== Anorthosis loan ====
On 30 August 2021, Ninua joined Anorthosis on a season-long loan.

==== Lamia loan ====
On 30 August 2022, Ninua joined Lamia on a season-long loan.

== Career statistics ==
=== Club ===
As of 29 May 2022

Club	Season	League			Cup		Continental		Other		Total	
Club	Season	Division	Apps	Goals	Apps	Goals	Apps	Goals	Apps	Goals	Apps	Goals
Dinamo Tbilisi	2016	Erovnuli Liga	3	0	–		–		–		3	0
Dinamo Tbilisi	2017	Erovnuli Liga	14	1	2	0	–		–		16	1
Dinamo Tbilisi	2018	Erovnuli Liga	29	3	4	0	2	0	–		35	3
Dinamo Tbilisi	2019	Erovnuli Liga	31	8	2	0	6	1	–		39	9
Dinamo Tbilisi	2020	Erovnuli Liga	2	1	–		–		–		2	1
Dinamo Tbilisi	Total		79	13	8	0	8	1	0	0	95	14
PAOK	2020–21	Super League Greece	9	1	3	1	–		–		12	2
Anorthosis (loan)	2021–22	Cypriot First Division	3	0	–		–		–		3	0
Lamia (loan)	2021–22	Superleague Greece	2	0	0	0	–		–		2	0
PAOK B	2022–23	Super League Greece 2	18	0	0	0	–		–		18	0
Career total			111	14	11	1	8	1	0	0	130	16

== Honours ==
=== Club ===
Dinamo Tbilisi

- Erovnuli Liga: 2019, 2020

PAOK

- Greek Cup: 2020–21
