= Mykhaylo Shyshka =

Ukrainian footballer

Personal information
- Full name: Mykhaylo Olehovych Shyshka
- Date of birth: 5 July 1994 (age 32)
- Place of birth: Dobrotvir, Ukraine
- Height: 1.75 m (5 ft 9 in)
- Position: Defensive midfielder

Team information
- Current team: Mynai
- Number: 76

Youth career
- 2007–2011: UFK Karpaty Lviv

Senior career*
Years	Team	Apps	(Gls)
2011–2016	Shakhtar Donetsk	0	(0)
2011–2013	→ Shakhtar-3 Donetsk	35	(0)
2016–2018	Riteriai	51	(3)
2018–2019	Obolon-Brovar Kyiv	21	(3)
2019	Dinamo Tbilisi	7	(1)
2020	Samtredia	0	(0)
2020–2022	Inhulets Petrove	27	(0)
2022	Lviv	11	(0)
2023–	Mynai	5	(0)

International career^{‡}
2011	Ukraine U17	3	(0)
2011	Ukraine U18	2	(0)
2012–2013	Ukraine U19	9	(0)
2015	Ukraine U21	3	(0)
- * Club domestic league appearances and goals as of 1 April 2023 ‡ National team caps and goals as of 10 August 2021

Mykhaylo Olehovych Shyshka (Ukrainian: Михайло Олегович Шишка; born 5 July 1994) is a Ukrainian professional footballer who plays as a defensive midfielder for Mynai.
