= Antonio Rojano =

Argentine footballer

Personal information
- Full name: Antonio Raúl Rojano
- Date of birth: 27 April 1991 (age 35)
- Place of birth: Salliqueló, Argentina
- Height: 1.78 m (5 ft 10 in)
- Position: Striker

Team information
- Current team: PAS Korinthos

Senior career*
Years	Team	Apps	(Gls)
2010–2011	Gimnasia La Plata	11	(1)
2011–2012	Villa San Carlos	31	(8)
2014–2015	Sportivo Italiano	50	(10)
2015–2017	Real Potosí	51	(24)
2017–2018	Hamilton Academical	26	(3)
2018–2019	Burgos	12	(0)
2019	Dinamo Tbilisi	9	(0)
2019–2023	Niki Volos	69	(17)
2023–	PAS Korinthos		
- * Club domestic league appearances and goals as of 17:28, 10 January 2023 (UTC)

Antonio Raúl Rojano (born 27 April 1991) is an Argentine professional footballer who plays as a striker for Greek club PAS Korinthos.

== Career ==
Born in Salliqueló, Rojano spent his early career in Argentina and Bolivia with Gimnasia La Plata, Villa San Carlos, Sportivo Italiano and Real Potosí.

He signed for Scottish club Hamilton Academical in August 2017, but was not granted a work permit until October 2017, spending the two months in between training with the team. He left the club in July 2018 after his contract was cancelled by mutual consent.

After spending the first half of the 2018–19 season with Burgos, on 23 January 2019, he signed a season-long deal with Dinamo Tbilisi. In August 2019 he moved to Greek club Niki Volos.

After four years with Niki Volos, he joined Gamma Ethniki side PAS Korinthos.
