= Fran Carbià =

Spanish footballer (born 1992)

Personal information
- Full name: Francisco Carbià Barrera
- Date of birth: 31 March 1992 (age 34)
- Place of birth: Tarragona, Spain
- Height: 1.73 m (5 ft 8 in)
- Position: Winger

Team information
- Current team: Reus FCR
- Number: 11

Youth career
- 1998–2004: La Salle
- 2004–2010: Gimnàstic

Senior career*
Years	Team	Apps	(Gls)
2010–2013	Pobla Mafumet	90	(26)
2013–2018	Reus	159	(20)
2019	Dinamo Tbilisi	11	(2)
2019–2020	Ibiza	11	(0)
2020	→ Gimnàstic (loan)	6	(2)
2020–2022	Gimnàstic	63	(9)
2022–2023	Badalona Futur	32	(4)
2023–2025	Linense	55	(13)
2025–	Reus FCR	26	(1)
- * Club domestic league appearances and goals as of 7 May 2026

Francisco 'Fran' Carbià Barrera (born 31 March 1992) is a Spanish footballer who plays mainly as a left winger for Segunda Federación club Reus FC Reddis.

== Club career ==
Born in Tarragona, Catalonia, Carbià finished his development with hometown club Gimnàstic de Tarragona. He was promoted to the farm team in 2010, making his debut for the latter in the Tercera División.

Carbià was an unused substitute in a 3–1 Segunda División away win against FC Cartagena on 17 March 2012, and appeared with the main squad in the 2011 and 2012 pre-seasons, although his spell was mainly associated to the reserves. On 8 July 2013, he agreed to a contract with Segunda División B club CF Reus Deportiu.

On 20 November 2015, as his contract was due to expire, Carbià renewed his link until 2017, and contributed four goals in 33 appearances as his side achieved promotion to division two for the first time ever. He made his professional debut on 27 August 2016, starting and scoring the first in a 1–1 home draw against CD Mirandés.

On 16 October 2016, Carbià scored a brace in a 2–0 win at UCAM Murcia CF. Six days later, he closed the 2–1 home victory over CD Lugo, taking his tally up to five in the first 11 matches.

On 28 December 2018, Carbià was one of the five players who left Reus due to unpaid wages. The following 11 January, he signed with FC Dinamo Tbilisi for five months.

Carbiá returned to the Spanish third tier in the summer of 2019, joining UD Ibiza on a two-year deal. The following transfer window, he moved to Gimnàstic de Tarragona in the same league on loan until 30 June. On 2 September 2020, he agreed to a permanent contract at the latter side.

In August 2023, Carbià signed a one-year contract at Real Balompédica Linense, from CF Badalona Futur also in the Segunda Federación. Two years later, he remained in that league on a deal at Reus FC Reddis.
