= Marc Ferré =

Andorran footballer

Personal information
- Full name: Marc Ferré Nazzaro
- Date of birth: 11 January 1994 (age 32)
- Place of birth: Andorra la Vella, Andorra
- Position: Midfielder

Team information
- Current team: Penya Encardana
- Number: 15

Senior career*
Years	Team	Apps	(Gls)
2010–2019	FC Andorra	157	(7)
2019–2020	UE Engordany	28	(2)
2020–2021	UE Santa Coloma	19	(0)
2021–2022	FC Ordino	9	(0)
2022	Sant Julià	4	(0)
2023–	Penya Encardana	8	(0)

International career^{‡}
2018–	Andorra	2	(0)
- * Club domestic league appearances and goals as of 24 June 2023 ‡ National team caps and goals as of 13:34, 16 November 2018 (UTC)

Marc Ferré Nazzaro (born 11 January 1994) is an Andorran international footballer who plays for Penya Encardana as a midfielder.

== Career ==
Born in Andorra la Vella, Ferré has played club football for FC Andorra.

He made his international debut for Andorra in 2018.
