= Carlos Peppe =

Uruguayan-born Andorran footballer (born 1983)

Personal information
- Full name: Carlos Eduardo Peppe Britos
- Date of birth: 28 January 1983 (age 43)
- Place of birth: Montevideo, Uruguay
- Height: 1.71 m (5 ft 7 in)
- Position: Midfielder

Team information
- Current team: Sant Julià
- Number: 4

Senior career*
Years	Team	Apps	(Gls)
2002–2004	Defensor Sporting		
2005–2006	Cerrito	37	(0)
2007–2014	Sant Julià		
2014–2015	FC Andorra	38	(3)
2015–2016	Sant Julià	17	(1)
2016–2017	Encamp	25	(2)
2017–2019	Engordany	44	(0)
2019–	Sant Julià	13	(0)

International career^{‡}
2011–	Andorra	21	(0)
- * Club domestic league appearances and goals as of 21:25, 10 February 2020 (UTC) ‡ National team caps and goals as of 10 October 2015

Carlos Eduardo "Edu" Peppe Britos (born 28 January 1983) is an Uruguayan-born Andorran international footballer who plays for UE Sant Julià in Primera Divisió, as a midfielder. Besides Uruguay, he has played in Andorra.

== Career ==
Peppe began his senior career at Defensor Sporting in 2002, moving to Cerrito in 2005. He signed for Sant Julià in 2007.

He made his international debut for Andorra in 2011.
