= Levan Shengelia =

Georgian footballer (born 1995)

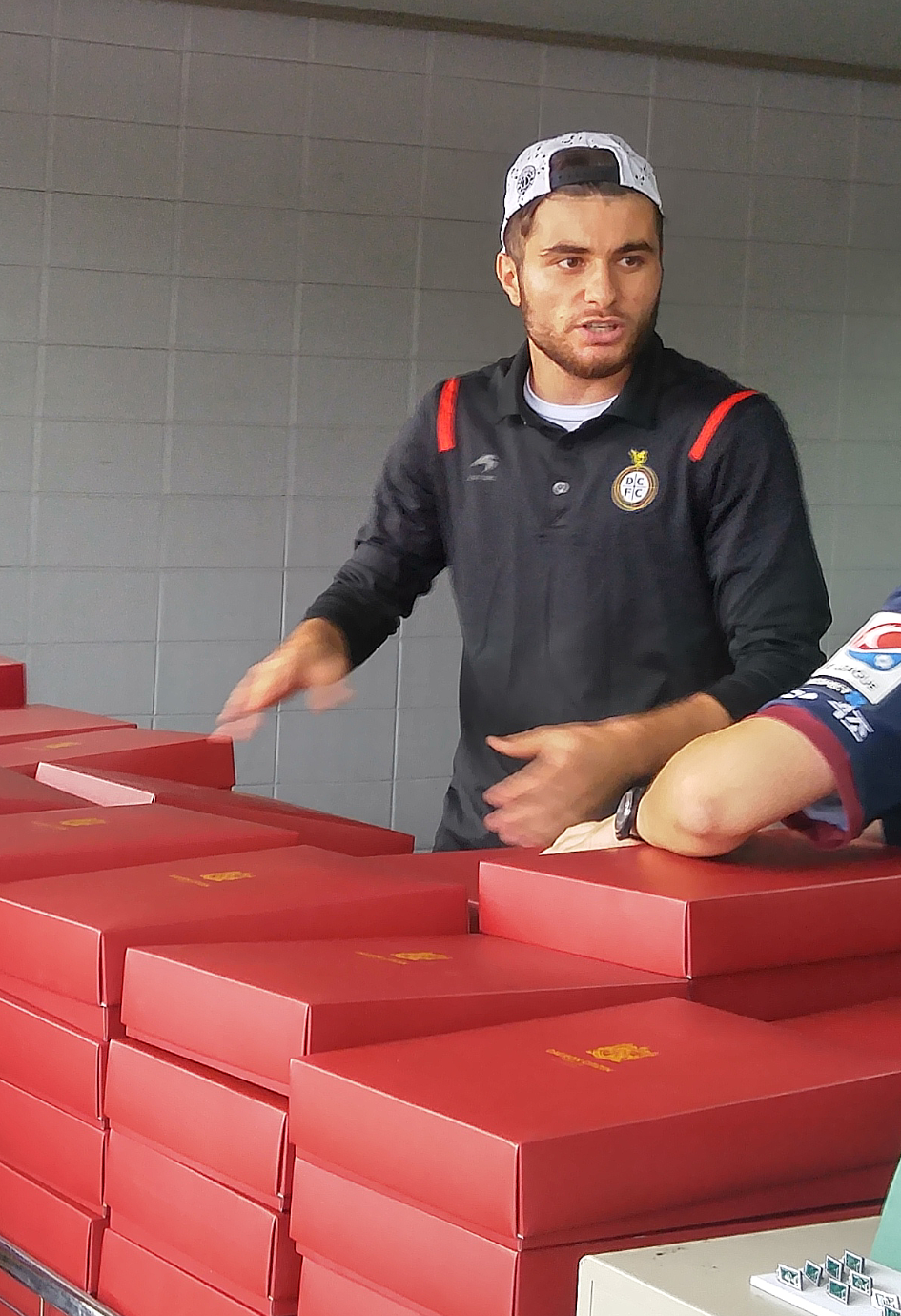
- Shengelia with Daejeon Citizen in 2017

Personal information
- Date of birth: 27 October 1995 (age 31)
- Place of birth: Samtredia, Georgia
- Height: 1.84 m (6 ft 0 in)
- Position: Winger

Team information
- Current team: Dinamo Batumi
- Number: 27

Senior career*
Years	Team	Apps	(Gls)
2013–2014	Dila Gori II	14	(3)
2014	Dila Gori	3	(0)
2014	Torpedo Kutaisi	1	(0)
2015	Kolkheti Poti	11	(4)
2015–2018	Tubize	40	(3)
2017	→ Daejeon Citizen (loan)	30	(5)
2018–2019	Dinamo Tbilisi	50	(25)
2019–2021	Konyaspor	59	(7)
2021–2022	OH Leuven	22	(3)
2022–2024	Panetolikos	51	(5)
2024–2026	OFI	58	(4)
2026–	Dinamo Batumi	0	(0)

International career^{‡}
2013–2014	Georgia U19	4	(0)
2015–2016	Georgia U21	4	(1)
2019–	Georgia	23	(1)
- * Club domestic league appearances and goals as of 17 May 2026 ‡ National team caps and goals as of 8 June 2025

Levan Shengelia (Order of Honor) (Georgian: ლევან შენგელია; born 27 October 1995) is a Georgian professional footballer who plays as a winger for Erovnuli Liga club Dinamo Batumi and the Georgia national team.

Shengelia has played in Georgia, Belgium, South Korea, Turkey and Greece, and was a member of Georgia's first ever UEFA Euro squad in 2024. He was made an Order of Honor in 2024.

== Career ==
Shengelia was born on 27 October 1995, in Samtredia.

On 12 August 2015, Shengelia was announced at Tubize on a permanent transfer.

In 2017, Shengelia joined Daejeon Hana Citizen.

On 2 September 2019, Shengelia was announced at Konyaspor on a two-year contract with the option of another year.

In 2021, Shengelia joined OH Leuven on a permanent transfer, making 24 appearances and scoring three goals.

On 17 August 2022, Shengelia was announced at Panetolikos on a two-year contract.

In June 2024, Shengelia was appointed the Order of Honor by Salomé Zourabichvili.

On 9 August 2024, Shengelia was announced at OFI on a two-year contract.

On 9 August 2026, he returned to Georgia to sign for Dinamo Batumi on a deal until December 2028.

== International career ==
Shengelia made his Georgia national team debut on 12 October 2019 in a Euro 2020 qualifier against Republic of Ireland. He substituted Giorgi Kvilitaia in the 73rd minute. He made his first start in the next qualifier against Gibraltar on 15 October 2019 and provided two assists in a 3–2 victory.

On 22 May 2024, Shengelia was announced in the Georgia squad for the UEFA Euro 2024.

== Career statistics ==
=== Club ===
As of match played 17 May 2026

Appearances and goals by club, season and competition
Club	Season	League			National cup		Continental		Other		Total	
Club	Season	Division	Apps	Goals	Apps	Goals	Apps	Goals	Apps	Goals	Apps	Goals
Dila Gori II	2013–14	Pirveli liga	14	3	—		—		—		14	3
Dila Gori	2013–14	Umaglesi Liga	3	0	0	0	—		—		3	0
Torpedo Kutaisi	2014–15	Umaglesi Liga	1	0	2	0	—		—		3	0
Kolkheti Poti	2014–15	Umaglesi Liga	11	4	—		—		—		11	4
Tubize	2015–16	Second Division	26	2	0	0	—		—		26	2
Tubize	2016–17	First Division B	14	1	1	0	—		—		15	1
Tubize	Total		40	3	1	0	—		—		41	3
Daejeon Citizen (loan)	2017	K League 2	28	5	1	0	—		—		29	5
Dinamo Tbilisi	2018	Erovnuli Liga	16	5	3	1	—		—		19	6
Dinamo Tbilisi	2019	Erovnuli Liga	24	12	2	4	5	3	—		31	19
Dinamo Tbilisi	Total		40	17	5	5	5	3	—		50	25
Konyaspor	2019–20	Süper Lig	23	2	1	0	—		—		24	2
Konyaspor	2020–21	Süper Lig	33	5	2	0	—		—		35	5
Konyaspor	Total		56	7	3	0	—		—		59	7
OH Leuven	2021–22	Belgian First Division A	22	3	3	0	—		—		25	3
Panetolikos	2022–23	Super League Greece	31	3	1	0	—		—		32	3
Panetolikos	2023–24	Super League Greece	20	2	4	0	—		—		24	2
Panetolikos	Total		51	5	5	0	—		—		56	5
OFI Crete	2024–25	Super League Greece	28	2	8	1	—		1	0	37	3
OFI Crete	2025–26	Super League Greece	30	2	8	0	—		—		38	2
OFI Crete	Total		58	4	16	1	—		1	0	75	5
Dinamo Batumi	2026	Erovnuli Liga	0	0	0	0	—		—		0	0
Career total			314	51	36	6	5	3	1	0	366	60

=== International ===
As of match played 7 June 2025

Appearances and goals by national team and year
National team	Year	Apps	Goals
Georgia	2019	4	0
Georgia	2020	3	0
Georgia	2021	3	0
Georgia	2022	1	0
Georgia	2023	3	1
Georgia	2024	6	0
Georgia	2025	3	0
Total		23	1

Scores and results list Georgia's goal tally first, score column indicates score after each Shengelia goal.

List of international goals scored by Levan Shengelia
No.	Date	Venue	Opponent	Score	Result	Competition
1.	15 October 2023	Mikheil Meskhi Stadium, Tbilisi, Georgia	Cyprus	3–0	4–0	UEFA Euro 2024 qualifying

== Honours ==
OFI

- Greek Cup: 2025–26
