= Abdeljalil Medioub =

Association football player (born 1997)

Personal information
- Full name: Abdeljalil Zaim Idriss Medioub
- Date of birth: 28 August 1997 (age 29)
- Place of birth: Marseille, France
- Height: 1.97 m (6 ft 6 in)
- Position: Defender

Youth career
- 2005–2010: Marseille
- 2014–2015: Marseille
- 2015–2016: Granada

Senior career*
Years	Team	Apps	(Gls)
2016–2017	Cacereño	2	(0)
2017–2018	Don Benito	13	(0)
2018–2019	Recreativo Granada	0	(0)
2019	→ Dinamo Tbilisi (loan)	19	(1)
2019–2020	Bordeaux B	12	(1)
2020–2022	Bordeaux	10	(0)
2020–2021	→ Tondela (loan)	16	(0)
2022–2023	Aris Limassol	5	(0)
2023	USM Khenchela	2	(0)
2024–2025	Al-Jahra		
2025–2026	Al-Zulfi	14	(0)

International career^{‡}
2020–	Algeria	1	(0)
- * Club domestic league appearances and goals as of 27 November 2023 ‡ National team caps and goals as of 10 June 2022

Abdeljalil Zaim Idriss Medioub (Arabic: عبد الجليل زعيم إدريس مديوب; born 28 August 1997) is a professional footballer who plays as a defender. Born in France, he plays for the Algeria national team.

== Club career ==
Medioub was a youth product at Marseille, and spent his early career in various reserve teams in Spain. In 2019, he moved to Dinamo Tbilisi on loan and began his professional career there. He then joined the reserve side of Bordeaux, and on 28 September 2020 signed with Tondela in the Primeira Liga. On 9 September 2023, he joined USM Khenchela. On 27 November 2023, Medioub left USM Khenchela.

On 30 August 2025, Medioub joined Saudi FDL club Al-Zulfi.

== International career ==
Born in France, Medioub is Algerian by descent. He made his debut with the Algeria national team in a friendly 1–0 win over Nigeria on 9 October 2020.

== Honours ==
Aris Limassol

- Cypriot First Division: 2022–23
