= Giorgi Papava =

Georgian footballer

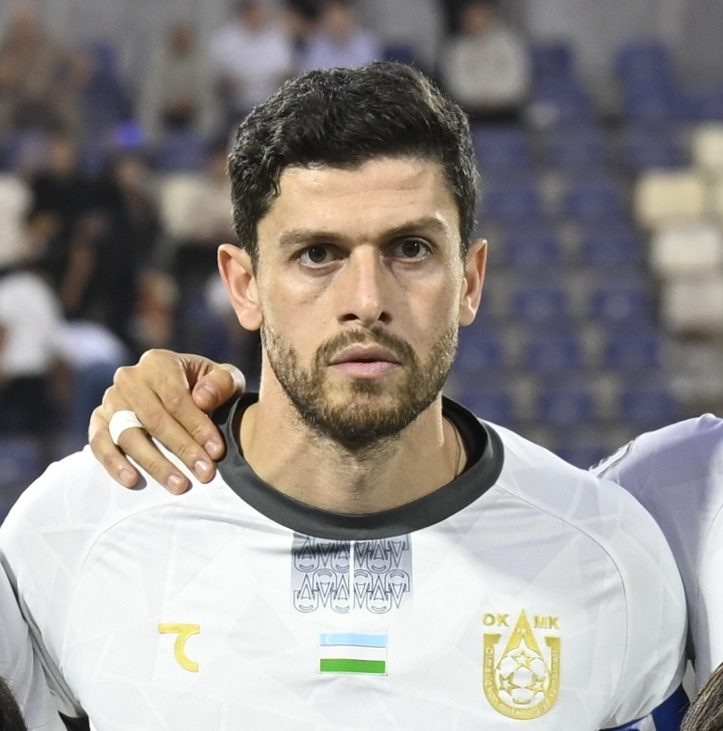
- Papava with AGMK in 2025

Personal information
- Date of birth: 16 February 1993 (age 33)
- Place of birth: Tbilisi, Georgia
- Height: 1.86 m (6 ft 1 in)
- Position: Midfielder

Team information
- Current team: AGMK
- Number: 5

Youth career
- 2004–2011: Dinamo Tbilisi

Senior career*
Years	Team	Apps	(Gls)
2011–2015	Dinamo Tbilisi	47	(0)
2012	→ Dinamo-2 Tbilisi (loan)	11	(1)
2015	Nea Salamis	13	(0)
2015–2017	Dila Gori	32	(0)
2018–2019	Rustavi	34	(1)
2019–2022	Dinamo Tbilisi	100	(5)
2022–2023	AGMK	13	(1)
2023	Pakhtakor	3	(0)
2023–2024	Gagra	11	(0)
2024–	AGMK	62	(3)

International career^{‡}
2011–2012	Georgia U-19	5	(0)
2013–2014	Georgia U-21	11	(0)
2014	Georgia	3	(0)
- * Club domestic league appearances and goals as of 28 July 2026 ‡ National team caps and goals as of 11 October 2014

Giorgi Papava (born 16 February 1993) is a Georgian professional footballer who plays as a midfielder for Uzbek club FC AGMK.

== Career ==
On 7 January 2024, Papava extended his contract with Dinamo Tbilisi until the end of the 2021 season.

== Honours ==
Dinamo Tbilisi

- Georgian League: 2012–13; 2013–14
- Georgian Cup: 2013; 2014
- Georgian Super Cup: 2014
