= Levan Kutalia =

Georgian footballer (born 1989)

Levan Kutalia ლევან კუტალია
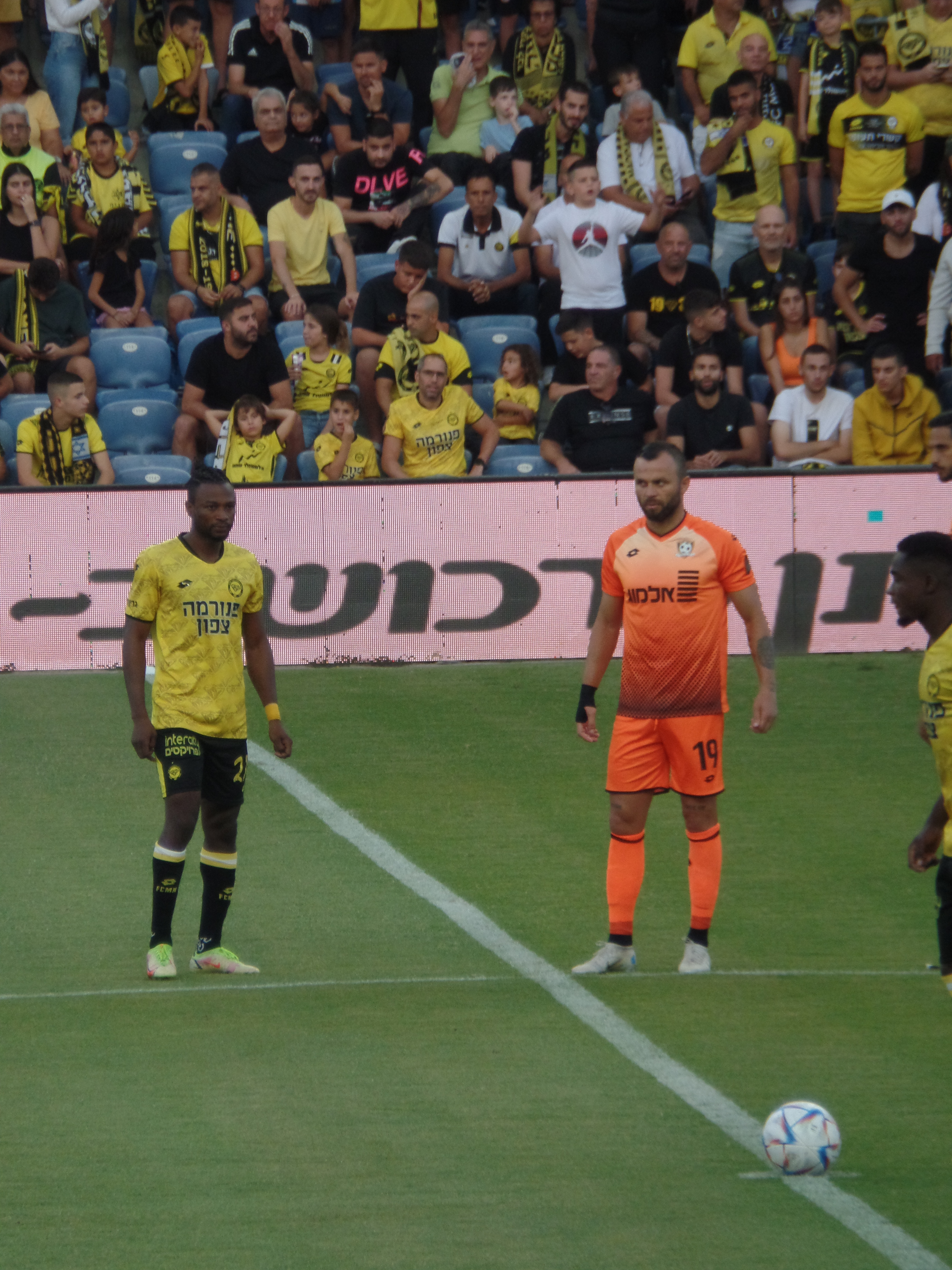
- Kutalia and an opponent on the pitch during a 2022 match

Personal information
- Date of birth: 19 July 1989 (age 37)
- Place of birth: Zugdidi, Georgian SSR
- Height: 1.84 m (6 ft 1/2 in)
- Position: Forward

Team information
- Current team: Odishi 1919
- Number: 19

Senior career*
Years	Team	Apps	(Gls)
2007–2008	Mglebi Zugdidi	12	(2)
2008–2010	Slavija Sarajevo	27	(7)
2011	Zrinjski Mostar	16	(3)
2012–2013	Zugdidi	31	(4)
2013–2014	Zestaponi	22	(0)
2014–2015	Shukura	19	(1)
2015	Dinamo Zugdidi	12	(0)
2015	Merani Martvili	9	(0)
2016	Odishi 1919	13	(8)
2016–2017	Shukura	29	(9)
2017–2018	Torpedo Kutaisi	49	(15)
2019	Dinamo Tbilisi	33	(20)
2020	Irtysh Pavlodar	2	(0)
2020	Hapoel Tel Aviv	8	(0)
2021	Hapoel Umm al-Fahm	18	(7)
2021–2023	Sektzia Ness Ziona	59	(14)
2023	Alashkert	19	(12)
2024	Dinamo Batumi	11	(1)
2024	Samgurali	18	(10)
2025	Rustavi	12	(5)
2025	Samtredia	17	(9)
2026	Hapoel Acre	19	(3)
2026–	Odishi 1919	2	(1)

International career^{‡}
2009	Georgia U-21	4	(0)
- * Club domestic league appearances and goals as of 16 August 2026 ‡ National team caps and goals as of 9 October 2009

Levan Kutalia (Georgian: ლევან კუტალია; born 19 July 1989) is a Georgian professional footballer who plays as a forward for Erovnuli Liga 2 club Odishi 1919.

He has won five Georgian trophies with three different clubs and the Erovnuli Liga goalscorer's award.

== Career ==
Levan Kutalia started his career in his home town. After a one-year tenure at Mglebi, he became the first Georgian player who moved to a Bosnian football division. While playing for Slavija Sarajevo, he was named the 2nd best foreign player of the league.

Later Kutalia had to return to his boyhood club, which bore four different names during his four seasons there - Mglebi, Baia, Zugdidi, Dinamo. For the last time the sides signed a one-year deal in January 2015.

In July 2017, the striker joined Torpedo Kutaisi, where he clinched all three domestic trophies. He personally contributed to a Super Cup victory with his injury-time winner against Chikhura.

After his departure from Torpedo, Kutalia signed a season-long contract with Dinamo Tbilisi. The 2019 season ended with his wide recognition, as the league top scorer was named Striker of the Year.

In a sharp contrast, his next move turned out unfortune. After taking part in two games for Irtysh Pavlodar, his new club was suspended due to financial issues. Besides, he did not get paid for four months and could not get back home as a result of COVID restrictions.

On 27 July 2020, Kutalia signed in Hapoel Tel Aviv from the Israeli Premier League.

On 7 July 2023, Alashkert announced the signing of Kutalia. In the winter break, the player left the club as its top scorer with 12 goals in 19 league appearances.

In March 2024, Kutalia joined Georgia's reigning champions Dinamo Batumi. In his third appearance for his new team, he scored and sealed a 2–0 win against his former club Dinamo Tbilisi on 8 April. The latter sustained another defeat following Kutalia's winning goal in early August in his debut game for Samgurali who had signed him a few days earlier. On 10 November 2024, Kutalia became only the second player of this league season to net four goals in a single match as his team came from behind to beat Gagra 4–2.

In February 2025, Kutalia moved to Erovnuli Liga 2 side Rustavi, although five months later joined the list of players involved in summer transfers. His contract with fellow Liga 2 club Samtredia was announced on 24 July 2025. With 14 goals on his account this season, Kutalia finished third in the goalscorers' chart in 2025.

On 6 July 2026, his hometown 2nd division club Odishi 1919 announced the return of Kutalia after a ten-year absence.

== Statistics ==
As of match played 15 August 2026

Data available from 2009 to 2010 season

Appearances and goals by club, season and competition
Club	Season	League			National cup		Continental		Other		Total	
Club	Season	Division	Apps	Goals	Apps	Goals	Apps	Goals	Apps	Goals	Apps	Goals
Slavija Sarajevo	2009/10	Bosnian Premier League	11	0	–		4	1	–		15	1
Zrinjski Mostar	2011/12	Bosnian Premier League	11	2	–		–		–		11	2
Zrinjski Mostar	2011/12	Bosnian Premier League	5	1	–		–		–		5	1
Zrinjski Mostar	Total		16	3	0	0	0	0	0	0	16	3
Baia/Zugdidi	2011/12	Umaglesi Liga	14	2	–		–		–		14	2
Baia/Zugdidi	2012/13	Umaglesi Liga	17	2	–		–		–		17	2
Baia/Zugdidi	2014/15	Umaglesi Liga	12	0	–		–		–		12	0
Baia/Zugdidi	Total		43	4	0	0	0	0	0	0	43	4
Zestaponi	2012/13	Umaglesi Liga	9	0	2	0	–		1 (Note: Appearances in Georgian Super Cup)	0	12	0
Zestaponi	2013/14	Umaglesi Liga	13	0	3	0	–		–		16	0
Zestaponi	Total		22	0	5	0	0	0	1	0	28	0
Shukura Kobuleti	2013/14	Pirveli Liga	8	1	3	0	–		–		11	1
Shukura Kobuleti	2014/15	Umaglesi Liga	11	0	–		–		–		11	0
Shukura Kobuleti	2016	Umaglesi Liga	12	3	–		–		–		12	3
Shukura Kobuleti	2017	Erovnuli Liga	17	6	1	1	–		–		18	7
Shukura Kobuleti	Total		48	10	4	1	0	0	0	0	52	11
Merani Martvili	2015/16	Umaglesi Liga	9	0	2	0	–		–		11	0
Odishi 1919	2015/16	Pirveli Liga	13	8	–		–		–		13	8
Torpedo Kutaisi	2017	Erovnuli Liga	15	5	3	1	–		–		18	6
Torpedo Kutaisi	2018	Erovnuli Liga	34	10	4	1	6	1	1	1	45	13
Torpedo Kutaisi	Total		49	15	7	2	6	1	1	1	63	19
Dinamo Tbilisi	2019	Erovnuli Liga	33	20	1	0	5	2	–		39	22
Irtysh Pavlodar	2020	Kazakhstan Premier League	2	0	–		–		–		2	0
Hapoel Tel-Aviv	2020/21	Ligat Ha'al	8	0	4	0	–		–		12	0
Umm al-Fahm	2020/21	Liga Leumit	18	7	1	1	–		1 (Note: Appearances in Play-offs)	0	20	8
Sektzia Ness Ziona	2021/22	Liga Leumit	35	9	1	0	–		–		36	9
Sektzia Ness Ziona	2022/23	Ligat Ha'al	24	5	3	2	–		–		27	7
Sektzia Ness Ziona	Total		59	14	4	2	0	0	0	0	63	16
Alashkert	2023/24	Armenian Premier League	19	12	1	0	3	0	–		23	12
Dinamo Batumi	2024	Erovnuli Liga	11	1	–		–		–		11	1
Samgurali	2024	Erovnuli Liga	18	10	–		–		–		18	10
Rustavi	2025	Erovnuli Liga 2	12	5	–		–		–		12	5
Samtredia	2025	Erovnuli Liga 2	17	9	2	1	–		–		19	10
Odishi 1919	2026	Erovnuli Liga 2	2	1	1	1	–		–		3	2
Odishi 1919	Total		15	9	1	1	0	0	0	0	16	10
Career total			410	119	32	8	18	4	3	1	463	132

== Other activities ==
Kutalia is a socially active person who often expresses his opinion on events happening in his country, whether it is his resolute support for Georgian territorial integrity or the policy of its European integration. He has paid tribute to a young tennis player, who perished in an accident in Tbilisi, and victims of a massive landside in Shovi which killed more than thirty people.

Kutalia has also rendered financial assistance to Odishi 1919 where he had played for several months.

== Honours ==
=== Team ===
- Erovnuli Liga (2): 2017, 2019
- David Kipiani Cup (1): 2018
- Georgian Super Cup (2): 2012, 2018

=== Individual ===
- Erovnuli Liga Forward of the Year: 2019
- Erovnuli Liga Goalscorer of the Year: 2019
