= Arfang Daffé =

Senegalese footballer

Personal information
- Full name: Arfang Boubacar Daffé
- Date of birth: 24 June 1991 (age 35)
- Place of birth: Senegal
- Height: 1.78 m (5 ft 10 in)
- Position: Winger

Youth career
- 2007–2011: Diambars
- 2011: Atlético Madrid

Senior career*
Years	Team	Apps	(Gls)
2011–2017	Diambars	93	(12)
2011	→ Atlético Madrid B (loan)	1	(0)
2017	Kolkheti Poti	22	(2)
2017–2018	Paykan	21	(1)
2018	Torpedo Kutaisi	14	(2)
2019	Nassaji Mazandaran	13	(0)
2019–2020	Dinamo Tbilisi	15	(1)
2020	→ Samtredia (loan)	6	(0)
2021	Al-Shabab		
2022	Gagra	8	(0)
2024	Teungueth		
- * Club domestic league appearances and goals as of 18:37, 24 July 2024 (UTC)

Arfang Boubacar Daffé (born 24 June 1991) is a Senegalese professional footballer who plays as a midfielder.

== Club career ==
Arfan B . Daffé is a product of Diambars FC. The club loaned him to Atlético Madrid B during 2011, but after suffering an injury he returned to Diambars.

=== Paykan ===
In August 2017, he signed a one-year contract with Paykan.

=== Teungueth ===
On 15 February 2024, Teungueth announced the signing of Daffé.
