= Nodar Kavtaradze =

Russian footballer (born 1993)

Personal information
- Full name: Nodar Malkhazovich Kavtaradze
- Date of birth: 2 January 1993 (age 33)
- Height: 1.68 m (5 ft 6 in)
- Positions: Attacking midfielder; winger

Team information
- Current team: Gagra
- Number: 7

Youth career
- 2009–2012: Lokomotiv Moscow

Senior career*
Years	Team	Apps	(Gls)
2012–2014	Lokomotiv-2 Moscow	58	(6)
2014–2015	Tyumen	4	(0)
2015	Volga Tver	10	(0)
2016	Druzhba Maykop	8	(0)
2017	Locomotive Tbilisi	31	(5)
2018	Dila Gori	31	(5)
2019	Torpedo Kutaisi	20	(7)
2019–2021	Dinamo Tbilisi	25	(13)
2021	Mezőkövesd	6	(0)
2021	Dinamo Tbilisi	13	(1)
2022	Saburtalo Tbilisi	16	(1)
2022	Torpedo Kutaisi	10	(0)
2023	Andijon	11	(0)
2024–	Gagra	17	(1)
- * Club domestic league appearances and goals as of 10 December 2024

Nodar Malkhazovich Kavtaradze (Russian: Нодар Малхазович Кавтарадзе; born 2 January 1993) is a Russian professional footballer who plays for Georgian side Gagra.

== Club career ==
He made his debut in the Russian Second Division for FC Lokomotiv-2 Moscow on 22 April 2012 in a game against FC Volga Tver.

He made his Russian Football National League debut for FC Tyumen on 6 July 2014 in a game against FC Volgar Astrakhan.

== Honours ==
Torpedo Kutaisi

- Georgian Cup: 2022
