= 2019 Erovnuli Liga =

Erovnuli Liga
- Season: 2019
- Dates: 1 March 2019 – 1 December 2019
- Champions: Dinamo Tbilisi; 17th Georgian title
- Relegated: Rustavi; Sioni Bolnisi; WIT Georgia
- Champions League: Dinamo Tbilisi
- Europa League: Dinamo Batumi; Saburtalo Tbilisi; Locomotive Tbilisi
- Top goalscorer: Levan Kutalia (20)

The 2019 Erovnuli Liga or Crystalbet Erovnuli Liga 2019 (formerly known as Umaglesi Liga) was the 31st season of top-tier football in Georgia. Saburtalo Tbilisi were the defending champions. The season began on 1 March 2019 and ended on 1 December 2019.

== Teams and stadiums ==
Locations of the 2019 Erovnuli Liga teams.

Team	Location	Venue	Capacity
Chikhura Sachkhere	Sachkhere	Central Stadium	2,000
Dila Gori	Gori	Tengiz Burjanadze Stadium	5,000
Dinamo Batumi	Batumi	Chele Arena	6,000
Dinamo Tbilisi	Tbilisi	Boris Paichadze Stadium	54,549
Locomotive Tbilisi	Tbilisi	Mikheil Meskhi Stadium	27,223
FC Rustavi	Rustavi	Poladi Stadium	10,720
Saburtalo Tbilisi	Tbilisi	Mikheil Meskhi Stadium	27,223
Sioni Bolnisi	Bolnisi	Tamaz Stepania Stadium	3,242
Torpedo Kutaisi	Kutaisi	Ramaz Shengelia Stadium	19,400
WIT Georgia	Mtskheta	Mtskheta Park	2,000

== League table ==
Pos	Team	Pld	W	D	L	GF	GA	GD	Pts	Qualification or relegation
1	Dinamo Tbilisi (C)	36	23	6	7	70	31	+39	75	Qualification for the Champions League first qualifying round
2	Dinamo Batumi	36	21	7	8	57	31	+26	70 (Note: Head-to-head points: Dinamo Batumi 7, Saburtalo Tbilisi 4)	Qualification for the Europa League first qualifying round
3	Saburtalo Tbilisi	36	21	7	8	67	36	+31	70	Qualification for the Europa League first qualifying round
4	Locomotive Tbilisi	36	17	4	15	44	46	−2	55	Qualification for the Europa League first qualifying round
5	Chikhura Sachkhere	36	12	11	13	48	44	+4	47	
6	Torpedo Kutaisi	36	12	8	16	53	54	−1	44	
7	Dila Gori	36	11	10	15	40	44	−4	43	
8	Rustavi (R)	36	9	11	16	40	56	−16	38 (Note: Head-to-head away goals scored: Rustavi 4, Sioni Bolnisi 2)	Qualification to Relegation play-offs
9	Sioni Bolnisi (R)	36	10	8	18	38	80	−42	38	Qualification to Relegation play-offs
10	WIT Georgia (R)	36	4	8	24	15	50	−35	20	Relegation to Erovnuli Liga 2

Source: Erovnuli Liga, Soccerway
Rules for classification: 1) Points; 2) Head-to-head points; 3) Head-to-head goal difference; 4) Head-to-head goals scored; 5) Head-to-head away goals scored (only if two teams); 6) Goal difference; 7) Goals scored.
(C) Champions; (R) Relegated

== Results ==
Each team will play the other nine teams home and away twice, for a total of 36 games each.

=== First half of season ===
Home \ Away	CHI	DIL	DBT	DTB	LOC	RUS	SAB	SIO	TKU	WIT
Chikhura Sachkhere	—	1–1	1–2	2–2	1–0	0–0	0–0	5–0	0–0	1–0
Dila Gori	2–0	—	1–0	2–3	3–1	2–1	1–1	0–0	0–2	0–1
Dinamo Batumi	0–0	1–0	—	3–2	2–1	2–1	4–2	5–1	0–2	2–0
Dinamo Tbilisi	2–0	1–0	0–1	—	1–3	3–1	4–2	5–1	2–1	2–1
Locomotive Tbilisi	2–0	1–0	1–0	0–4	—	4–1	1–3	1–2	1–3	0–1
Rustavi	1–1	2–1	0–2	0–1	0–2	—	3–1	1–1	2–4	0–0
Saburtalo Tbilisi	2–3	2–1	1–0	2–0	1–0	2–1	—	2–1	3–0	3–0
Sioni Bolnisi	0–5	2–1	2–4	2–1	0–0	3–3	2–3	—	2–1	1–0
Torpedo Kutaisi	5–3	3–3	3–2	0–0	0–2	2–0	2–3	3–2	—	2–1
WIT Georgia	1–1	0–1	0–1	1–0	0–3	2–3	0–3	0–1	3–0	—

Source: Erovnuli Liga
Legend: Blue = home team win; Yellow = draw; Red = away team win.

=== Second half of season ===
Home \ Away	CHI	DIL	DBT	DTB	LOC	RUS	SAB	SIO	TKU	WIT
Chikhura Sachkhere	—	4–1	2–0	0–2	3–2	3–2	1–3	2–2	1–1	2–1
Dila Gori	2–1	—	0–0	1–2	0–1	0–0	2–0	2–0	2–2	2–0
Dinamo Batumi	2–0	0–0	—	1–1	2–1	2–1	1–0	2–0	2–2	1–1
Dinamo Tbilisi	1–0	5–0	2–1	—	0–1	2–2	2–1	1–1	2–1	2–0
Locomotive Tbilisi	0–2	1–0	2–1	0–6	—	1–1	1–0	1–1	2–0	1–1
Rustavi	1–0	2–2	0–2	0–2	2–1	—	0–3	2–1	2–0	1–0
Saburtalo Tbilisi	1–0	3–0	0–0	0–0	4–0	2–2	—	5–1	1–1	3–1
Sioni Bolnisi	2–1	0–4	0–4	0–3	1–2	2–1	1–3	—	2–0	1–0
Torpedo Kutaisi	1–2	1–1	1–2	0–1	0–2	0–1	0–2	7–0	—	1–0
WIT Georgia	0–0	0–2	0–3	0–3	0–2	0–0	0–0	0–0	0–2	—

Source: Erovnuli Liga
Legend: Blue = home team win; Yellow = draw; Red = away team win.

== Relegation play-offs ==
5 December 2019
14:00

Telavi	1–0	Rustavi
Basheleishvili 54'	Report

Givi Chokheli Stadium, Telavi
Attendance: 1,000
Referee: Giorgi Kruashvili
11 December 2019
13:30

Rustavi	1–2	Telavi
Kavtaradze 3' (pen.)	Report	Latsabidze 15' (o.g.); Dzotsenidze 32'

Poladi Stadium, Rustavi
Attendance: 700
Referee: Irakli Kvirikashvili

5 December 2019
14:00

Sioni Bolnisi	0–0	Samtredia
	Report

Tamaz Stephania Stadium, Bolnisi
Attendance: 1,000
Referee: Papuna Matcharadze
11 December 2019
13:30

Samtredia	4–1	Sioni Bolnisi
Kilasonia 32'; Qurbanov 38', 71'; Samushia 64'	Report	Ugulava 77'

Erosi Manjgaladze Stadium, Samtredia
Attendance: 2,000
Referee: Giorgi Vadatchkoria

== Season statistics ==
=== Top scorers ===
As of match played 10 November 2019

Rank	Player	Club	Goals
1	(Georgia (country)) Levan Kutalia	Dinamo Tbilisi	19
2	(Brazil) Flamarion	Dinamo Batumi	16
3	(Georgia (country)) Budu Zivzivadze	Torpedo Kutaisi	13
3	(Georgia (country)) Irakli Sikharulidze	Locomotive Tbilisi	13
5	(Georgia (country)) Levan Shengelia	Dinamo Tbilisi	12
6	(Georgia (country)) Gega Diasamidze	Saburtalo Tbilisi	11
6	(Russia) Nodar Kavtaradze	Dinamo Tbilisi	11
8	(Georgia (country)) Lasha Shindagoridze	Saburtalo Tbilisi	10
9	(Georgia (country)) Bidzina Makharoblidze	Chikhura Sachkhere	9
9	(Georgia (country)) Jaba Ugulava	Sioni Bolnisi	9

== Attendances ==
#	Football club	Average attendance
1	Dinamo Batumi	4,361
2	Dila Gori	1,900
3	Dinamo Tbilisi	1,281
4	Torpedo Kutaisi	1,272
5	Sioni Bolnisi	594
6	Locomotive Tbilisi	564
7	FC Rustavi	514
8	FC Saburtalo Tbilisi	456
9	Chikhura Sachkhere	319
10	FC WIT Georgia	303
