= 2006–07 in Georgian football =

2006–07 in Georgian football is the 18th edition of Umaglesi Liga

== League table ==
=== Umaglesi Liga ===
Pos	Team	Pld	W	D	L	GF	GA	GD	Pts	Qualification or relegation
1	Olimpi Rustavi (C)	26	19	6	1	57	9	+48	63	Qualification for the Champions League first qualifying round
2	Dinamo Tbilisi	26	20	2	4	57	19	+38	62	Qualification for the UEFA Cup first qualifying round
3	Ameri Tbilisi	26	17	6	3	53	14	+39	57	Qualification for the UEFA Cup first qualifying round
4	Zestaponi	26	16	9	1	55	11	+44	57	Qualification for the Intertoto Cup first round
5	WIT Georgia	26	12	9	5	40	28	+12	45	
6	Sioni Bolnisi	26	11	4	11	28	26	+2	37	
7	Torpedo Kutaisi (R)	26	9	4	13	24	35	−11	31	Relegation to Pirveli Liga (Note: Torpedo Kutaisi and Chikhura Sachkhere relegated due to financial reasons. Their place were placed by Dila Gori and Spartaki Tskhinvali)
8	Locomotive Tbilisi	26	8	6	12	25	34	−9	30 (Note: Head-to-head points: Locomotive Tbilisi 8, Dinamo Batumi 4, Borjomi 3.)	
9	Dinamo Batumi	26	8	6	12	27	30	−3	30	
10	Borjomi	26	8	6	12	29	35	−6	30	
11	Merani Tbilisi	26	6	8	12	20	41	−21	26	
12	Chikhura Sachkhere (R, O)	26	5	6	15	13	46	−33	21	Qualification to Relegation play-offs
13	Dila Gori	26	3	6	17	21	56	−35	15	Relegation to Pirveli Liga
14	Kakheti Telavi (R)	26	0	2	24	21	86	−65	2	Relegation to Pirveli Liga

Source: rsssf.org
Rules for classification: 1st points; 2nd matches won; 3rd head-to-head
(C) Champions; (O) Play-off winners; (R) Relegated

=== Pirveli Liga ===
Pos	Team	Pld	W	D	L	GF	GA	GD	Pts	Promotion, qualification or relegation
1	Mglebi Zugdidi (C, P)	34	24	4	6	58	24	+34	76	Promotion to Umaglesi Liga
2	Meskheti Akhaltsikhe (P)	34	22	6	6	69	19	+50	72	Promotion to Umaglesi Liga
3	Gagra	34	18	6	10	52	36	+16	60	Qualification for Promotion play-offs
4	WIT Georgia-2	34	17	7	10	60	29	+31	58	
5	Magharoeli Chiatura	34	16	9	9	49	32	+17	57	
6	Ameri-2 Tbilisi	34	15	12	7	58	36	+22	57	
7	Meshakre Agara	34	15	10	9	45	36	+9	55	
8	Norchi Dinamoeli	34	16	4	14	50	49	+1	52	
9	Meshakhte Tkibuli	34	15	6	13	53	40	+13	51	
10	Olimpi Tbilisi	34	14	8	12	52	47	+5	50	
11	Samtredia	34	13	8	13	35	43	−8	47	
12	Zestaponi-2	34	10	10	14	34	40	−6	40	
13	Racha Ambrolauri	34	9	12	13	41	49	−8	39	
14	Dinamo-2 Tbilisi	34	9	9	16	49	40	+9	36	
15	Guria Lanchkhuti (R)	34	8	7	19	36	76	−40	31	Relegation to Meore Liga
16	Chikhura-2 Sachkhere (R)	34	8	5	21	28	67	−39	29	Relegation to Meore Liga
17	Spartaki Tbilisi (R)	34	7	6	21	19	51	−32	27	Relegation to Meore Liga
18	Mertskhali Ozurgeti (R)	34	3	5	26	21	95	−74	14	Relegation to Meore Liga

Source: rsssf.org
Rules for classification: 1) Points; 2) Number of wins; 3) Head-to-head record
(C) Champions; (P) Promoted; (R) Relegated

== Georgian Cup ==
Final

May 26, 2007

Ameri Tbilisi	1 – 0	Zestaponi
Dimitri Tatanashvili 61'

Tbilisi
Attendance: 25,000

== International Cup Competitions ==
Sioni Bolnisi

- Commonwealth of Independent States Cup 2007: Third place in group stage
- UEFA Champions League 2006-07: Second qualifying round

Ameri Tbilisi

- UEFA Cup 2006-07: Second qualifying round

WIT Georgia

- UEFA Cup 2006-07: First qualifying round

Dinamo Tbilisi

- UEFA Intertoto Cup 2006: Second Round

== National team ==
August 16, 2006
18:00 WEST

Faroe Islands	0 – 6	Georgia
	Report	Mujiri 16'; Iashvili 18'; Arveladze 37', 62', 82'; Kobiashvili 51' (pen.)

Svangaskard, Toftir
Attendance: 2,114
Referee: Ross (Northern Ireland)

September 2, 2006
20:00 UTC+4

Georgia	0 – 3	France
	Report	Malouda 7'; Saha 15'; Asatiani 47' (o.g.)

Boris Paichadze Stadium, Tbilisi
Attendance: 65,000
Referee: Wegereef (Netherlands)

September 6, 2006
19:00 EEST

Ukraine	3 – 2	Georgia
Shevchenko 31'; Rotan 61'; Rusol 80'	Report	Arveladze 38'; Demetradze 60'

NSC Olimpiysky, Kyiv
Attendance: 40,000
Referee: Jara (Czech Republic)

October 7, 2006

Germany	2 – 0	Georgia

Rostock, Germany (friendly)

October 11, 2006
20:00 UTC+4

Georgia	1 – 3	Italy
Shashiashvili 26'	Report	De Rossi 18'; Camoranesi 63'; Perrotta 71'

Boris Paichadze Stadium, Tbilisi
Attendance: 50,000
Referee: Riley (England)

15 November 2006

Georgia	2 – 0	Uruguay

Tbilisi, Georgia (friendly)

February 7, 2007

Georgia	1 – 0	Turkey

Tbilisi, Georgia (friendly)

March 24, 2007
15:00 GMT

Scotland	2 – 1	Georgia
Boyd 11'; Beattie 89'	Report	Arveladze 41'

Hampden Park, Glasgow
Attendance: 50,850
Referee: Vollquartz (Denmark)

March 28, 2007
18:00 UTC+4

Georgia	3 – 1	Faroe Islands
Siradze 25'; Iashvili 46', 90+5' (pen.)	Report	R. Jacobsen 57'

Boris Paichadze Stadium, Tbilisi
Attendance: 15,000
Referee: Saliy (Kazakhstan)

June 2, 2007
21:00 EEST

Lithuania	1 – 0	Georgia
Mikoliūnas 78'	Report

S.Darius and S.Girėnas, Kaunas
Attendance: 6,000
Referee: Circhetta (Switzerland)

June 6, 2007
21:00 CEST

France	1 – 0	Georgia
Nasri 33'	Report

Stade de l'Abbé Deschamps, Auxerre
Attendance: 21,000
Referee: Batista (Portugal)

=== U21 ===
August 16, 2006

Lithuania	1 – 0	Georgia
Panka 14' (pen.)	Report

S. Darius and S. Girėnas Stadium, Kaunas
Referee: Kari (Finland)

September 3, 2006

Georgia	1 – 3	Serbia
Iashvili 45'	Report	Mrđa 17'; Babović 46'; Milovanović 66' (pen.)

Mikhail Meskhi Stadium, Tbilisi
Referee: Coltescu (Romania)

June 5, 2007

Georgia	1 – 3	Spain
	Report	José Enrique 74'

Boris Paichadze Stadium, Tbilisi
Referee: Krajnc (Slovenia)

=== U19 ===
October 4, 2006

Georgia	1 – 0	Northern Ireland
Benashvili 43'	Report

Astra, Ploiești, Romania
Referee: Strahonja (Croatia)

October 6, 2006

Romania	3 – 0	Georgia
Ochiroșii 25'; Cojocnean 55', 87'	Report

Compet, Strejnicu
Referee: Strahonja (Croatia)

October 9, 2006

Georgia	3 – 2	Belgium
Tsinamdzgvrishvili 10'; Benashvili 85'; Khidesheli 90+2'	Report	Vossen 72'; Pollet 90+3'

Astra, Ploiești, Romania
Referee: Zrnić (Bosnia and Herzegovina)

May 23, 2007

Portugal	0 – 0	Georgia
	Report

McDiarmid Park, Perth, Scotland
Referee: Moen (Norway)

May 25, 2007

Scotland	2 – 1	Georgia
McLaren 36'; Pearce 88'	Report	Barabadze 6'

McDiarmid Park, Perth
Referee: Moen (Norway)

May 28, 2007

Georgia	1 – 1	Turkey
Tsinamdzgvrishvili 79'	Report	Keleş 90'

Dens Park, Dundee, Scotland
Referee: Olsiak (Slovakia)

=== U17 ===
October 13, 2006

Russia	2 – 1	Georgia
Vavilchenkov 13', 73' (pen.)	Report	Kenia 69'

Mikheil Meskhi Stadium, Tbilisi, Georgia
Referee: Tsachilidis (Greece)

October 15, 2006

Germany	1 – 0	Georgia
Funk 68'	Report

Boris Paichadze Stadium, Tbilisi, Georgia
Referee: Tsachilidis (Greece)

October 18, 2006

Georgia	5 – 0	Macedonia
Shonia 30', 62'; Jokhadze 42', 46', 75'	Report

Boris Paichadze Stadium, Tbilisi
Referee: Sapi (Hungary)
