= 2008–09 Georgian Cup =

Tournament details
- Country: Georgia
- Teams: 29

Final positions
- Champions: Dinamo Tbilisi
- Runners-up: Olimpi Rustavi
- UEFA Europa League: Dinamo Tbilisi

The 2008–09 Georgian Cup (also known as the David Kipiani Cup) was the sixty-fifth season overall and nineteenth since independence of the Georgian annual football tournament. The competition began on 30 August 2008 and ended with the Final held on 30 May 2009. The defending champions are Zestaponi.

== Round of 32 ==
The first legs were played on 1 August and the second legs were played on 4 August 2008.

=== Section West ===
Team 1	Agg.	Team 2	1st leg	2nd leg
Meskheti Akhaltsikhe	1–4	Kolkheti-1913 Poti	0–1	1–3
Mglebi Zugdidi	1–5	Baia Zugdidi	1–5	0–0
Borjomi	1–2	Samtredia	0–1	1–1
Spartaki Tskhinvali	11–0	Ozurgeti	5–0	6–0
Magharoeli Chiatura	4–1	Torpedo Kutaisi	1–1	3–0
Meshakhte Tkibuli	2–10	Guria Lanchkhuti	1–4	1–6
Merani Martvili	5–3	Kolkheti Khobi	4–0	1–3

=== Section East ===
Team 1	Agg.	Team 2	1st leg	2nd leg
Olimpi Rustavi	7–0	Hereti Lagodekhi	5–0	2–0
Ameri Tbilisi	4–1	Kakheti Telavi	2–1	2–0
Sioni Bolnisi	11–0	Norchi Dinamo	4–0	7–0
Locomotive Tbilisi	10–3	Aragvi Dusheti	8–0	2–3
Gagra	2–7	FC Tbilisi	2–4	0–3
Spartaki Tbilisi	1–4	Chikhura Sachkere	1–0	0–4

== Round of 16 ==
In this round entered winners from the previous round as well as three teams that finished first, second and third in last year's Umaglesi Liga: Dinamo Tbilisi, WIT Georgia and Zestaponi. The first legs were played on August 30 and 31 and the second legs were played on September 16 and 17, 2008.

Team 1	Agg.	Team 2	1st leg	2nd leg
WIT Georgia	5–1	Samtredia	2–1	3–0
Zestaponi	5–1	Chikhura Sachkere	5–0	0–1
Locomotive Tbilisi	6–1	Magharoeli Chiatura	3–0	3–1
Spartaki Tskhinvali	2–3	Merani Martvili	1–0	1–3
Dinamo Tbilisi	10–1	FC Tbilisi	6–1	4–0
Sioni Bolnisi	4–1	Kolkheti-1913 Poti	3–0	1–1
Ameri Tbilisi	4–1	Guria Lanchkhuti	2–1	2–0
Olimpi Rustavi	5–1	Baia Zugdidi	1–1	4–0

== Quarterfinals ==
The matches were played on 12 November (first legs) and 26 November 2008 (second legs).

Team 1	Agg.	Team 2	1st leg	2nd leg
Locomotive Tbilisi	5–4	Sioni Bolnisi	2–3	3–1
WIT Georgia	4–2	Merani Martvili	2–0	2–2
Zestaponi	0–1	Dinamo Tbilisi	0–0	0–1 (aet)
Olimpi Rustavi	6–2	Ameri Tbilisi	3–0	3–2

== Semifinals ==
The matches were played on 14 April (first legs) and 29 April 2009 (second legs).

Team 1	Agg.	Team 2	1st leg	2nd leg
Olimpi Rustavi	4–2	WIT Georgia	4–2	0–0
Locomotive Tbilisi	2–3	Dinamo Tbilisi	0–2	2–1

== Final ==
30 May 2009
20:00 UTC+4

Dinamo Tbilisi	1–1	Olimpi Rustavi
Nergadze 79'	(Report)	Megreladze 89'
Penalties
Nergadze (penalty scored); Khmaladze (penalty scored); Koshkadze (penalty missed); Tomichi (penalty missed)	2–0	(penalty missed) Oniani; (penalty missed) Chelidze; (penalty missed) Pipia; (penalty missed) Chikviladze

Mikheil Meskhi Stadium, Tbilisi
Attendance: 12,000
Referee: Lasha Silagava (Tbilisi)

== See also ==
- 2008–09 Umaglesi Liga
- 2008–09 Pirveli Liga
