= 2026 FC Dinamo Batumi season =

Dinamo Batumi
2026 season
- Chairman: (Georgia (country)) Archil Beridze
- Manager: (Georgia (country)) Giorgi Chiabrishvili
- Stadium: Batumi Stadium
Home colours	Away colours	Third colours

The 2026 season will be Dinamo Batumi 102nd season in the clubs history. During this season the club will participate in the following competitions: Erovnuli Liga,Georgian Cup.

== Current squad ==
As of 21 September 2026

Note: Flags indicate national team as defined under FIFA eligibility rules; some limited exceptions apply. Players may hold more than one non-FIFA nationality.

No.	Pos.	Nation	Player
1	GK	GEO	Lazare Kupatadze
3	DF	GEO	Alika Getiashvili
4	DF	GEO	Luka Kapianidze
5	DF	GAM	Yahya Kalley
6	MF	UKR	Artem Mylchenko
7	FW	MDA	Dmitri Mandrîcenco
8	MF	GEO	Sandro Altunashvili
9	FW	BRA	Maurides
10	MF	ALB	Uerdi Mara
11	FW	BRA	Paulo Vítor
12	DF	GEO	Luka Lakvekheliani
13	GK	GEO	Nodari Kalichava
14	MF	GEO	Giorgi Kokhreidze
15	DF	LUX	Enes Mahmutović
16	MF	ISR	Awaka Eshata

No.	Pos.	Nation	Player
18	MF	NED	Imran Oulad Omar
19	DF	GEO	Nika Kalandarishvili
20	FW	GEO	Luka Tsulukidze
22	FW	GEO	Tornike Kirkitadze
23	DF	GEO	Mamuka Kobakhidze (captain)
24	DF	LUX	Dirk Carlson
25	DF	GEO	Zura Tedoradze
27	FW	GEO	Levan Shengelia
29	DF	BUL	Ivan Turitsov
30	GK	GEO	Mate Turmanidze
31	GK	GEO	Saba Ismailov
35	DF	GEO	Revaz Chiteishvili
36	MF	GEO	Nika Baladze
37	MF	GEO	Giorgi Putkaradze
39	MF	GEO	Guram Japaridze

=== Out on loan ===
Note: Flags indicate national team as defined under FIFA eligibility rules; some limited exceptions apply. Players may hold more than one non-FIFA nationality.

No.	Pos.	Nation	Player
—	MF	GEO	Nika Dumbadze (West Georgia)
—	MF	GEO	Dachi Abuselidze (West Georgia)
—	FW	GEO	Levan Khozrevanidze (STK 1914 Šamorín)

== Friendly matches ==
30 January 2026 Friendly	Sileks (North Macedonia)	2-1	(Georgia (country)) Dinamo Batumi	Kratovo
16:00		Report		Stadium: Sileks Stadium

10 February 2026 Friendly	Neftchi (Uzbekistan)	4-1	(Georgia (country)) Dinamo Batumi	Fergana
15:00	Perica 25' (pen.); Ismoilov 62'; Giyosov 70'; Asilbek Jumaev 85'	Report	Beka Baramidze 79'	Stadium: Istiqlol Stadium

13 February 2026 Friendly	Oleksandriya (Ukraine)	1-0	(Georgia (country)) Dinamo Batumi	Oleksandriia
10:00	Mateus Amaral 82'	[		Stadium: CSC Nika Stadium

16 February 2026 Friendly	Sogdiana (Uzbekistan)	2-0	(Georgia (country)) Dinamo Batumi	Jizzakh
16:30	Mulić 8'; Jaloliddinov 37'	Report		Stadium: Sogdiana Stadium

=== Overview ===
Competition	First match	Last match	Starting round	Record							
Competition	First match	Last match	Starting round	Pld	W	D	L	GF	GA	GD	Win %
Erovnuli Liga	7 March 2026	5 December 2026	Matchday 1	31	17	8	6	54	37	+17	54.84
Georgian Cup	25 July 2026	9 December 2026	Third Round	4	4	0	0	13	4	+9	100.00
Total				35	21	8	6	67	41	+26	60.00

Last updated: 7 November 2026
Source: Competitions

=== Erovnuli Liga ===
==== League table ====
Pos	Team	Pld	W	D	L	GF	GA	GD	Pts	Qualification or relegation
1	Dinamo Batumi	32	17	8	7	56	40	+16	59	Qualification for the Champions League first qualifying round
2	Dinamo Tbilisi	32	16	10	6	52	32	+20	58	Qualification for the Conference League first qualifying round
3	Iberia 1999	31	17	5	9	45	33	+12	56	
4	Rustavi	32	16	8	8	40	28	+12	56	
5	Torpedo Kutaisi	32	11	10	11	53	44	+9	43	

Updated to match(es) played on 8 November 2026. Source: Erovnuli Liga, Soccerway
Rules for classification: 1) Points; 2) Goal difference; 3) Goals scored 4) Head-to-head points; 5) Head-to-head goal difference; 6) Head-to-head goals scored; 7) Head-to-head away goals scored (only if two teams).

==== Results summary ====
Overall								Home						Away					
Pld	W	D	L	GF	GA	GD	Pts	W	D	L	GF	GA	GD	W	D	L	GF	GA	GD
31	17	8	6	54	37	+17	59	11	3	2	31	18	+13	6	5	4	23	19	+4

Last updated: 1 November 2026.
Source: worldfootball

==== Results by round ====
Round	1
Ground	
Result	
Position	

Source: See Results
A = Away; H = Home; W = Win; D = Draw; L = Loss

==== Matches ====
7 March 2026 2	Dinamo Batumi	1-1	Gagra	Batumi
20:00 GET	Levan Khozrevanidze (yellow card) 30'; Kapianidze (yellow card) 42'; Chiteishvili (yellow card) 65'; Mylchenko (yellow card) 75'; Kalandarishvili 86' (pen.)	Report	Wanderson (yellow card) 45+2'; Claudinei (yellow card) 86'; Tsintsadze 90+5' (pen.)	Stadium: Batumi Arena; Attendance: 20,383; Referee: (Georgia (country)) Koba Revazashvili

12 March 2026 3	Samgurali	1-1	Dinamo Batumi	Tsqaltubo
19:00 GET	Wellissol 84'	Report	Lakvekheliani (yellow card) 4'; Kapianidze 27'; Kalandarishvili (yellow card) 54'	Stadium: 26 May Stadium; Attendance: 12,000; Referee: (Georgia (country)) Jener Khorava

16 March 2026 4	Meshakhte	0-0	Dinamo Batumi	Tkibuli
15:00 GET	Lasha Ugrekhelidze (yellow card) 32'; Tarik Šikalo (yellow card) 51'; Nikoloz Abuladze (yellow card) 90+2'	Report	Kobakhidze (yellow card) 24'; Chiteishvili (yellow card) 45'	Stadium: Vladimer Bochorishvili Stadium; Attendance: 400; Referee: (Georgia (country)) Bakar Bregadze

3 April 2026 5	Dinamo Batumi	4-1	Spaeri	Batumi
20:00 GET	Kalandarishvili 4'; Mandrîcenco 11' 14'; Guram Japaridze (yellow card) 45+3'; Mara 57'; Dachi Abuselidze (yellow card) 69'	Report	Tornike Askurava (yellow card) 4'; Saba Gegiadze 31'; Tamaz Tsetskhladze (yellow card) 75'; Zakaria Basilashvili (yellow card) 81'	Stadium: Batumi Arena; Attendance: 20,383; Referee: (Georgia (country)) Tsotne Samsonashvili

7 April 2026 6	Rustavi	3-0	Dinamo Batumi	Rustavi
16:00 GET	Shotiko Andguladze (yellow card) 27'; Irakli Iakobidze (yellow card) 53' (goal) 61'; Jean Souza 64'; Avtandil Gujabidze (yellow card) 88' (goal) 90'	Report	Mylchenko (yellow card) 58'	Stadium: Technical Centre; Attendance: 4,657; Referee: (Georgia (country)) Beka Kuntchulia

=== Georgian Cup ===
–
