= 2005–06 Georgian Cup =

Tournament details
- Country: Georgia
- Teams: 28

Final positions
- Champions: Ameri Tbilisi
- Runners-up: Zestaponi

The 2005–06 Georgian Cup (also known as the David Kipiani Cup) was the sixty-second season overall and sixteenth since independence of the Georgian annual football tournament. The competition began on 23 August 2005 and ended with the Final held on 13 May 2006. The defending champions are Locomotive Tbilisi.

== Round of 32 ==
Team 1	Agg.	Team 2	1st leg	2nd leg
Zestaponi	7–0	Zugdidi	3–0	4–0
Borjomi	4–1	Merani Tbilisi	2–0	2–1
Dila Gori	3–4	Meskheti Akhaltsikhe	3–3	0–1
Dinamo Sokhumi	2–2 (3–0 p)	Sagarejo	1–1	1–1 (a.e.t.)
Dinamo Batumi	6–1	Guria Lanchkhuti	3–0	3–1
Kolkheti-1913 Poti	8–0	Magharoeli Chiatura	6–0	2–0
Sioni Bolnisi	8–2	Liakhvi Tamarasheni	6–1	2–1
Ameri Tbilisi	5–3	Meshakre Agara	1–2	4–1
Spartaki Tbilisi	6–3	Samgori Gardabani	3–1	3–2
Kakheti Telavi	1–6	Chikhura Sachkhere	0–3	1–3
FC Tbilisi	3–2	Rustavi	3–1	0–1
Tskhinvali	7–7 (a)	Gagra	4–4	3–3

== Round of 16 ==
Team 1	Agg.	Team 2	1st leg	2nd leg
Ameri Tbilisi	4–1	Gagra	4–1	0–0
Borjomi	4–1	Dinamo Sokhumi	2–0	2–1
Dinamo Tbilisi	2–0	Chikhura Sachkhere	0–0	2–0 (a.e.t.)
Spartaki Tbilisi	1–7	Zestaponi	0–4	1–3
Sioni Bolnisi	4–1	Meskheti Akhaltsikhe	2–0	2–1
Dinamo Batumi	0–3	Kolkheti-1913 Poti	0–2	0–1
WIT Georgia	6–0	Torpedo Kutaisi	1–0	5–0
Locomotive Tbilisi	2–0	FC Tbilisi	1–0	1–0

== Quarterfinals ==
Team 1	Agg.	Team 2	1st leg	2nd leg
Ameri Tbilisi	1–0	Kolkheti-1913 Poti	0–0	1–0
WIT Georgia	4–1	Locomotive Tbilisi	3–1	1–0
Sioni Bolnisi	2–0	Borjomi	1–0	1–0
Zestaponi	1–0	Dinamo Tbilisi	1–0	0–0

== Semifinals ==
Team 1	Agg.	Team 2	1st leg	2nd leg
Sioni Bolnisi	0–1	Ameri Tbilisi	0–0	0–1
WIT Georgia	2–5	Zestaponi	1–2	1–3

== Final ==
13 May 2006

Ameri Tbilisi	2–2 (a.e.t.)	Zestaponi
Davitashvili 10'; Tsinamdzghvrishvili 50'		Ionanidze 29'; Ghonghadze 90'
Penalties
Dekanosidze (penalty missed); Bolkvadze (penalty scored); Tatanashvili (penalty scored); Davitnidze (penalty scored); Khvadagiani (penalty scored)	4–3	(penalty scored) Ganugrava; (penalty scored) Imedadze; (penalty missed) Pipia; (penalty scored) Ionanidze; (penalty missed) Chanturia

Mikheil Meskhi Stadium, Tbilisi
Attendance: 10,000
Referee: Giorgi Vadachkoria (Tbilisi)

== See also ==
- 2005–06 Umaglesi Liga
- 2005–06 Pirveli Liga
