= 2006–07 Pirveli Liga =

2006–07 Pirveli Liga was the 18th season of the Georgian Pirveli Liga.

== League standings ==
Pos	Team	Pld	W	D	L	GF	GA	GD	Pts	Promotion, qualification or relegation
1	Mglebi Zugdidi (C, P)	34	24	4	6	58	24	+34	76	Promotion to Umaglesi Liga
2	Meskheti Akhaltsikhe (P)	34	22	6	6	69	19	+50	72	Promotion to Umaglesi Liga
3	Gagra	34	18	6	10	52	36	+16	60	Qualification for Promotion play-offs
4	WIT Georgia-2	34	17	7	10	60	29	+31	58	
5	Magharoeli Chiatura	34	16	9	9	49	32	+17	57	
6	Ameri-2 Tbilisi	34	15	12	7	58	36	+22	57	
7	Meshakre Agara	34	15	10	9	45	36	+9	55	
8	Norchi Dinamoeli	34	16	4	14	50	49	+1	52	
9	Meshakhte Tkibuli	34	15	6	13	53	40	+13	51	
10	Olimpi Tbilisi	34	14	8	12	52	47	+5	50	
11	Samtredia	34	13	8	13	35	43	−8	47	
12	Zestaponi-2	34	10	10	14	34	40	−6	40	
13	Racha Ambrolauri	34	9	12	13	41	49	−8	39	
14	Dinamo-2 Tbilisi	34	9	9	16	49	40	+9	36	
15	Guria Lanchkhuti (R)	34	8	7	19	36	76	−40	31	Relegation to Meore Liga
16	Chikhura-2 Sachkhere (R)	34	8	5	21	28	67	−39	29	Relegation to Meore Liga
17	Spartaki Tbilisi (R)	34	7	6	21	19	51	−32	27	Relegation to Meore Liga
18	Mertskhali Ozurgeti (R)	34	3	5	26	21	95	−74	14	Relegation to Meore Liga

Source: rsssf.org
Rules for classification: 1) Points; 2) Number of wins; 3) Head-to-head record
(C) Champions; (P) Promoted; (R) Relegated

== See also ==
- 2006–07 Umaglesi Liga
- 2006–07 Georgian Cup
