= 2005–06 Pirveli Liga =

2005–06 Pirveli Liga was the 17th season of the Georgian Pirveli Liga.

== League standings ==
| Pos | Team | Pld | W | D | L | GF | GA | GD | Pts | Promotion, qualification or relegation |
|---|---|---|---|---|---|---|---|---|---|---|
| 1 | Chikhura Sachkhere (C, P) | 34 | 24 | 6 | 4 | 87 | 34 | +53 | 78 | Promotion to Umaglesi Liga |
| 2 | Merani Tbilisi (P) | 34 | 23 | 5 | 6 | 59 | 27 | +32 | 74 | Promotion to Umaglesi Liga |
| 3 | Gagra | 34 | 19 | 11 | 4 | 49 | 22 | +27 | 68 | Qualification for Promotion play-offs |
| 4 | Dinamo B Tbilisi | 34 | 18 | 8 | 8 | 57 | 27 | +30 | 62 | |
| 5 | Meshakre Agara | 34 | 18 | 5 | 11 | 46 | 32 | +14 | 59 | Qualification for Promotion play-offs |
| 6 | Meskheti Akhaltsikhe | 34 | 17 | 6 | 11 | 50 | 30 | +20 | 57 | |
| 7 | Ameri B Tbilisi | 34 | 14 | 9 | 11 | 40 | 29 | +11 | 51 | |
| 8 | Rustavi (Note: After the season, FC Rustavi were merged with FC Tbilisi and in the following season they were competed as Olimpi Rustavi in the Umaglesi Liga.) (R) | 34 | 13 | 10 | 11 | 50 | 37 | +13 | 49 | Withdrew from the league |
| 9 | Guria Lanchkhuti | 34 | 14 | 5 | 15 | 50 | 47 | +3 | 47 | |
| 10 | WIT-Georgia B Mtskheta | 34 | 13 | 6 | 15 | 43 | 45 | −2 | 45 | |
| 11 | Tbilisi B | 34 | 12 | 8 | 14 | 34 | 40 | −6 | 44 | Renamed to Olimpi Tbilisi? |
| 12 | Zugdidi | 34 | 12 | 7 | 15 | 24 | 33 | −9 | 43 | |
| 13 | Meshakhte Tkibuli | 34 | 11 | 9 | 14 | 38 | 40 | −2 | 42 | |
| 14 | Magharoeli Chiatura | 34 | 10 | 7 | 17 | 38 | 56 | −18 | 37 | |
| 15 | Zestafoni B | 34 | 9 | 9 | 16 | 23 | 44 | −21 | 36 | |
| 16 | Sagarejo (R) | 34 | 7 | 10 | 17 | 28 | 44 | −16 | 31 | Relegation to Meore Liga |
| 17 | Imedi Tbilisi (R) | 34 | 6 | 2 | 26 | 22 | 85 | −63 | 20 | Relegation to Meore Liga |
| 18 | Liakhvi Tamarasheni (R) | 34 | 4 | 1 | 29 | 24 | 90 | −66 | 13 | Relegation to Meore Liga |

Source: rsssf.org
Rules for classification: 1) Points; 2) Number of wins; 3) Head-to-head record
(C) Champions; (P) Promoted; (R) Relegated

== See also ==
- 2005–06 Umaglesi Liga
- 2005–06 Georgian Cup
