= 2006–07 Georgian Cup =

Tournament details
- Country: Georgia
- Teams: 28

Final positions
- Champions: Ameri Tbilisi
- Runners-up: Zestaponi

The 2006–07 Georgian Cup (also known as the David Kipiani Cup) was the sixty-third season overall and seventeenth since independence of the Georgian annual football tournament. The competition began on 10 August 2006 and ended with the Final held on 26 May 2007. The defending champions were Ameri Tbilisi.

== First round ==
Team 1	Agg.	Team 2	1st leg	2nd leg
Zestaponi	9–1	Guria Lanchkhuti	5–0	4–1
Torpedo Kutaisi	5–0	Meshakhte Tkibuli	2–0	3–0
Chikhura Sachkhere	4–0	Samtredia	4–0	0–0
Borjomi	6–0	Mertskhali Ozurgeti	4–0	2–0
Dila Gori	3–7	Meshakre Agara	0–4	3–3
Spartaki Tbilisi	4–1	Zooveti Tbilisi	3–1	1–0
Kakheti Telavi	6–6 (a)	Amirani Tbilisi	3–1	3–5
Merani Tbilisi	6–0	Liakhvi Tamarasheni	2–0	4–0
Locomotive Tbilisi	2–4	Norchi Dinamoeli	2–2	0–2
Gagra	2–3	Meskheti Akhaltsikhe	2–1	0–2
Olimpi Rustavi	9–2	Magharoeli Chiatura	5–1	4–1
Dinamo Batumi	3–3 (4–2 p)	Mglebi Zugdidi	1–2	2–1 (aet)

== Group stage ==
=== Group A ===
Pos	Team	Pld	W	D	L	GF	GA	GD	Pts	Qualification	ZES	AME	KAK	SPA
1	Zestaponi	6	4	1	1	14	3	+11	13	Advanced to Quarter-finals		4–1	5–0	0–0
2	Ameri Tbilisi	6	4	1	1	11	5	+6	13	Advanced to Quarter-finals	2–0		2–0	3–0
3	Kakheti Telavi	6	2	1	3	7	10	−3	7		0–2	1–1		3–0
4	Spartaki Tbilisi	6	0	1	5	0	14	−14	1		0–3	0–2	0–3	

Source: rsssf.com
Legend: Blue = home team win; Yellow = draw; Red = away team win.

=== Group B ===
Pos	Team	Pld	W	D	L	GF	GA	GD	Pts	Qualification	TKU	BOR	WIT	MES
1	Torpedo Kutaisi	6	3	2	1	6	4	+2	11	Advanced to Quarter-finals		4–1	1–0	0–0
2	Borjomi	6	2	2	2	5	9	−4	8	Advanced to Quarter-finals	0–0		0–0	3–1
3	WIT Georgia	6	1	3	2	4	2	+2	6		0–1	4–0		0–0
4	Meskheti Akhaltsikhe	6	1	3	2	4	4	0	6		3–0	0–1	0–0	

Source: rsssf.com
Legend: Blue = home team win; Yellow = draw; Red = away team win.

=== Group C ===
Pos	Team	Pld	W	D	L	GF	GA	GD	Pts	Qualification	DTB	CHI	RUS	NOR
1	Dinamo Tbilisi	6	4	0	2	17	7	+10	12	Advanced to Quarter-finals		5–1	3–0	4–1
2	Chikhura Sachkhere	6	3	2	1	7	6	+1	11	Advanced to Quarter-finals	2–0		1–0	1–1
3	Olimpi Rustavi	6	2	1	3	8	9	−1	7		3–2	0–0		3–0
4	Norchi Dinamoeli	6	1	1	4	5	15	−10	4		0–3	0–2	3–2	

Source: rsssf.com
Legend: Blue = home team win; Yellow = draw; Red = away team win.

=== Group D ===
Pos	Team	Pld	W	D	L	GF	GA	GD	Pts	Qualification	SIO	DBT	MER	MSH
1	Sioni Bolnisi	6	5	1	0	9	2	+7	16	Advanced to Quarter-finals		1–0	2–1	2–0
2	Dinamo Batumi	6	3	2	1	11	3	+8	11	Advanced to Quarter-finals	1–1		1–1	3–0
3	Merani Tbilisi	6	1	1	4	5	11	−6	4		0–1	0–4		1–3
4	Meshakre Agara	6	1	0	5	3	12	−9	3		0–2	0–2	0–2	

Source: rsssf.com
Legend: Blue = home team win; Yellow = draw; Red = away team win.

== Quarterfinals ==
The matches were played on 18 February (first legs) and 6 March 2007 (second legs).

Team 1	Agg.	Team 2	1st leg	2nd leg
Ameri Tbilisi	2–1	Dinamo Tbilisi	2–1	0–0
Dinamo Batumi	3–0	Torpedo Kutaisi	0–0	3–0
Chikhura Sachkhere	3–3 (a)	Sioni Bolnisi	2–3	1–0
Borjomi	2–3	Zestaponi	1–2	1–1

== Semifinals ==
The matches were played on 1 April (first legs) and 1 May 2007 (second legs).

Team 1	Agg.	Team 2	1st leg	2nd leg
Zestaponi	5–0	Dinamo Batumi	4–0	1–0
Ameri Tbilisi	4–4 (a)	Sioni Bolnisi	3–0	1–4

== Final ==
26 May 2007

Ameri Tbilisi	1–0	Zestaponi
Tatanashvili 61'

Boris Paichadze Stadium, Tbilisi
Attendance: 25,000
Referee: Cüneyt Çakır (Turkey)

== See also ==
- 2006–07 Umaglesi Liga
- 2006–07 Pirveli Liga
