= 2008–09 Umaglesi Liga =

Umaglesi Liga
- Season: 2008–09
- Dates: 13 September 2008 – 23 May 2009
- Champions: WIT Georgia; 2nd Georgian title
- Relegated: Meskheti; Borjomi
- Champions League: WIT Georgia
- Europa League: Dinamo Tbilisi; Olimpi Rustavi; Zestaponi
- Matches: 165
- Goals: 411 (2.49 per match)
- Top goalscorer: Nikoloz Gelashvili (20)
- Biggest home win: Dinamo Tbilisi 12–0 Borjomi
- Biggest away win: Borjomi 0–4 Dinamo Tbilisi; Gagra 0–4 WIT Georgia; Zestaponi 0–4 Dinamo Tbilisi
- Highest scoring: Dinamo Tbilisi 12–0 Borjomi

The 2008–09 Umaglesi Liga was the twentieth season of top-tier football in Georgia. It was scheduled to begin in August 2008, but the start of the league was delayed due to the 2008 South Ossetia war. The first round of games finally took place on 13 and 14 September 2008. The season ended with the 33rd round played on 23 May 2009. Dinamo Tbilisi were the defending champions.

The league was reduced from 14 to 12 teams prior to this season. However, Ameri Tbilisi voluntarily withdrew from the competition in mid-July because of financial reasons. As no replacement team was announced, the league featured only 11 teams.

== Promotion and relegation ==
Merani Tbilisi, Dinamo Batumi and Dila Gori were relegated at the end of the previous season due to finishing 12th through 14th, respectively. Spartaki Tskhinvali, who finished the previous season in 11th place, retained their spot in Umaglesi Liga after defeating Pirveli Liga runners-up Gagra by 1–0.

Due to the reduction of league size, only Pirveli Liga champions Chiatura were promoted. However, they did not want to compete in 2008–09 Umaglesi Liga because of unknown reasons, so Gagra took their spot.

== Stadia and locations ==
Location of teams in 2008–09 Umaglesi Liga

Team	Location	Venue	Capacity
FC Borjomi	Borjomi	Jemal Zeinklishvili Stadium	5,000
Dinamo	Tbilisi	Boris Paichadze Stadium	54,549
Gagra	Tbilisi	Ameri Stadium	1,000
Locomotive	Tbilisi	Mikheil Meskhi Stadium	27,223
Meskheti	Akhaltsikhe	Central Stadium	3,000
Mglebi	Zugdidi	Gulia Tutberidze Stadium	3,000
Olimpi	Rustavi	Poladi Stadium	10,720
Sioni	Bolnisi	Tamaz Stephania Stadium	3,000
Spartaki-Tskhinvali	Tbilisi	Kartli Stadium	1,500
WIT Georgia	Tbilisi	Shevardeni Stadium	4,000
FC Zestaponi	Zestaponi	David Abashidze Stadium	10,000

== League table ==
Pos	Team	Pld	W	D	L	GF	GA	GD	Pts	Qualification or relegation
1	WIT Georgia (C)	30	20	9	1	57	19	+38	69	Qualification for the Champions League second qualifying round
2	Dinamo Tbilisi	30	19	6	5	70	21	+49	63	Qualification for the Europa League second qualifying round (Note: Dinamo Tbilisi won the 2008–09 Georgian Cup and thereby qualified for the second qualifying round of the UEFA Europa League. Since they also finished second in the league, fourth-placed Zestaponi qualified for the first qualifying round of the UEFA Europa League.)
3	Olimpi Rustavi	30	16	9	5	40	20	+20	57	Qualification for the Europa League first qualifying round
4	Zestaponi	30	16	4	10	43	27	+16	52	Qualification for the Europa League first qualifying round
5	Sioni Bolnisi	30	11	11	8	35	29	+6	44	
6	Locomotive Tbilisi	30	10	8	12	35	33	+2	38	
7	Mglebi Zugdidi (Note: Mglebi withdrew from the league. The club was merged with FC Baia Zugdidi.) (R)	30	10	6	14	36	41	−5	36	Withdrew from the league
8	Meskheti Akhaltsikhe (Note: Meskheti withdrew from the league after the season concluded due to financial reasons. Therefore, Gagra and Spartaki Tskhinvali, who originally were to be demoted, were spared from relegation and play in the 2009–10 season of Umaglesi Liga.) (R)	30	7	8	15	23	42	−19	29	Relegation to Pirveli Liga
9	Gagra	30	7	7	16	23	48	−25	28	
10	Spartaki Tskhinvali	30	6	7	17	28	46	−18	25	
11	Borjomi (R)	30	2	7	21	21	85	−64	13	Withdrew from the league
—	Ameri Tbilisi (Note: Ameri Tbilisi voluntarily withdrew their participation before the start of the season due to financial reasons.) (R)	0	0	0	0	0	0	0	0	Withdrew from the league

Source: soccerway.com
Rules for classification: 1) points; 2) goal difference; 3) number of goals scored.
(C) Champions; (R) Relegated

== Results ==
=== First and second round ===
Home \ Away	BOR	DIN	GAG	LOC	MES	MGL	OLI	SIO	SPA	WIT	ZES
Borjomi		0–4	3–2	0–2	0–0	2–2	1–2	0–0	1–3	0–1	1–1
Dinamo Tbilisi	5–0		3–0	2–1	4–0	2–1	2–1	4–1	4–1	2–2	2–0
Gagra	2–0	2–1		0–0	3–1	2–0	0–0	1–1	0–2	0–4	1–3
Locomotive Tbilisi	4–0	1–0	2–0		2–0	0–1	0–2	0–1	2–1	0–1	1–2
Meskheti Akhaltsikhe	2–2	1–3	2–0	3–1		0–0	1–1	0–2	1–0	0–1	0–0
Mglebi Zugdidi	4–1	0–1	1–0	0–0	0–2		3–1	0–1	2–0	0–2	0–1
Olimpi Rustavi	1–1	1–0	3–0	0–0	4–0	2–1		0–0	1–0	0–0	0–0
Sioni Bolnisi	2–1	1–2	2–0	3–1	0–0	2–2	0–1		0–0	2–2	0–1
Spartaki Tskhinvali	1–2	0–3	1–1	1–4	1–1	4–0	1–1	0–3		0–1	1–2
WIT Georgia	4–1	1–1	2–0	1–2	1–0	3–0	1–1	1–1	2–0		2–1
Zestaponi	1–0	1–0	3–0	3–1	0–1	1–0	0–1	1–0	4–1	1–2	

Source: soccerway.com
Legend: Blue = home team win; Yellow = draw; Red = away team win.

=== Third round ===
Home \ Away	BOR	DIN	GAG	LOC	MES	MGL	OLI	SIO	SPA	WIT	ZES
Borjomi			1–2	1–1				1–2		0–3	1–3
Dinamo Tbilisi	12–0				2–0		2–1		2–2	1–1	
Gagra		0–1			2–0	2–2	0–1	1–2	1–1		
Locomotive Tbilisi		0–0	0–1		0–0	1–1	1–3	1–1			
Meskheti Akhaltsikhe	6–0						0–1		1–0	0–3	
Mglebi Zugdidi	5–0	1–0			4–1		1–2	2–0	2–1		
Olimpi Rustavi	6–1							0–1	1–0	1–3	1–0
Sioni Bolnisi		1–1			2–0					3–4	0–0
Spartaki Tskhinvali	2–0			1–3				2–1		0–0	1–0
WIT Georgia			0–0	3–1		4–0					2–1
Zestaponi		0–4	6–0	1–3	3–0	3–1					

Source: soccerway.com
Legend: Blue = home team win; Yellow = draw; Red = away team win.

== See also ==
- 2008–09 Pirveli Liga
- 2008–09 Georgian Cup
