= 2007–08 Pirveli Liga =

Football league season

Pirveli Liga
- Season: 2007–08
- Champions: Magharoeli Chiatura

2007–08 Pirveli Liga was the 19th season of the Georgian Pirveli Liga. The Pirveli Liga is the second division of Georgian Football. It consists of reserve and professional teams.

Although reserve teams were allowed to play in the same league system, they are not allowed to play in the same division.

== Pirveli Liga East ==
Pos	Team	Pld	W	D	L	GF	GA	GD	Pts	Qualification or relegation
1	Gagra (C)	27	16	6	5	59	36	+23	54	Qualification for Champions play-off
2	Dinamo B Tbilisi	27	14	7	6	41	24	+17	49	
3	WIT Georgia B Tbilisi	27	14	6	7	41	21	+20	48	
4	Meshakre Agara (R)	27	13	9	5	34	22	+12	48	Withdrew from the league?
5	Chikhura Sachkhere	27	12	7	8	40	37	+3	43	
6	Olimpi B Rustavi	27	9	8	10	35	41	−6	35	Renamed to FC Tbilisi?
7	Kakheti Telavi	27	10	4	13	38	41	−3	34	
8	Ameri B Tbilisi (R)	27	9	2	16	42	44	−2	29	Relegation to Meore Liga
9	Olimpiki Tbilisi (R)	27	7	4	16	38	52	−14	25	Withdrew from the league?
10	FC Norchi Dinamoeli	27	1	7	19	20	70	−50	10	

Source: rsssf.org
(C) Champions; (R) Relegated

== Pirveli Liga West ==
Pos	Team	Pld	W	D	L	GF	GA	GD	Pts	Qualification or relegation
1	Magharoeli Chiatura (C)	27	21	4	2	56	17	+39	67	Qualification for Champions play-off
2	Meshakhte Tkibuli	27	14	2	11	39	41	−2	44	
3	Merani Martvili	27	13	5	9	36	25	+11	44	
4	Zestafoni B	27	12	4	11	39	28	+11	40	
5	Kolkheti Poti	27	11	7	9	36	33	+3	40	
6	Torpedo Kutaisi	27	11	6	10	38	31	+7	39	
7	Kolkheti Khobi	27	10	8	9	35	27	+8	38	
8	Samtredia	27	9	5	13	35	51	−16	32	
9	Universiteti Kutaisi (R)	27	9	3	15	24	29	−5	30	Withdrew from the league?
10	Fazisi Racha (R)	27	2	2	23	17	73	−56	8	Withdrew in mid-season

Source: rsssf.org
(C) Champions; (R) Relegated

== Champions playoff ==
18 May 2008

Magharoeli Chiatura	2 – 2	Gagra
Penalties
	4 – 1

Magharoeli Chiatura promoted as champion.

== Relegation play-offs ==
24 May 2008

Spartaki Tskhinvali	1 – 0	Gagra

Gagra remain at 2nd level

== Aftermath ==
- FC Magharoeli Chiatura withdrew from 2008–09 Umaglesi Liga and renamed to FC Chiatura, FC Gagra took the place.
- FC Tbilisi split with FC Olimpi Rustavi, they took the B team place in Pirveli Liga next season.
- FC Norchi Dinamoeli Tbilisi and FC Merani B Tbilisi were split up, Norchi Dinamo (Young Dinamo) took the place in Pirveli Liga next season. While FC Merani Tbilisi played in West Zone due to relegation.
- Due to 2008 South Ossetia war, FC Meshakre Agara withdrew.

== See also ==
- 2007–08 Umaglesi Liga
- 2007–08 Georgian Cup
