= Mikheil Khutsishvili =

Georgian footballer

Mikhail Khutsishvili
Personal information
- Full name: Mikhail Khutsishvili
- Date of birth: 28 January 1979 (age 47)
- Place of birth: Tbilisi, Georgian SSR, Soviet Union
- Height: 1.83 m (6 ft 0 in)
- Position: Forward

Senior career*
Years	Team	Apps	(Gls)
1995–1996	Zhineri Zhinvali	1	(0)
1996–1997	Dinamo-2 Tbilisi	41	(18)
1997	Dinamo Tbilisi	3	(0)
1998	Lokomotivi Tbilisi	14	(0)
1998–1999	Merani-91 Tbilisi	26	(3)
1999	Sheriff Tiraspol	6	(1)
2000	Dinamo Tbilisi	5	(0)
2000–2001	Merani-91 Tbilisi	12	(1)
2001	Dinamo Tbilisi	0	(0)
2002–2003	Kalamata	15	(1)
2003	PAS Giannina	2	(0)
2004	Torpedo Kutaisi	8	(1)
2004–2005	Ganja	31	(10)
2006	Sioni Bolnisi	14	(4)
2006–2008	Dinamo Tbilisi	46	(21)
2008	Olimpik Baku	10	(0)
2009–2010	Vojvodina	11	(1)

International career
- Georgia U17
1997	Georgia U18	2	(0)
- Georgia U21
- Georgia

Managerial career
- 2010: Vojvodina (head scout)
- 2011: Dila Gori (sports director)
- 2011–2015: Zestafoni (general director)
- 2015–: Dinamo Tbilisi (general director)
- * Club domestic league appearances and goals

Mikhail Khutsishvili (Georgian: მიხეილ ხუციშვილი; born 28 January 1979) is a Georgian retired footballer who played as a forward. He unexpectedly retired because of serious heart problems. As of January 2016, he is the general director of FC Dinamo Tbilisi.

== Career ==
Khutsishvili begin his career as senior with Zhineri Zhinvali moving after only a year to the Georgian giant FC Dinamo Tbilisi. He represented in this early period also several other clubs, namely Georgian FC Lokomotivi Tbilisi and FC Merani-91 Tbilisi, bur also Moldovan FC Sheriff Tiraspol.

In 1997 he played two games for Georgian U18 national team.

In 2002, he moved to Greece where he played one season with Kalamata F.C. and another half season with PAS Giannina F.C. By January 2004 he returned to Georgia this time to play with FC Torpedo Kutaisi but after six months he moved to Azerbaijan signing with FK Ganja.

In January FC Sioni Bolnisi brought him back to Georgia what proved to be a good move since he ended up as part of Sioni's 2005–06 championship winning team. This was followed by the return to his former club FC Dinamo Tbilisi in summer 2006. He stayed with Dinamo 2 seasons winning another Georgian championship in 2007–08 and being in that same season the league topscorer.

In summer 2008 he moved to Azerbaijani FK Olimpik Baku but after only 6 months Serbian SuperLiga club FK Vojvodina offered him a contract. In summer 2009 he was joined in Vojvodina by another Georgian international footballer, Giorgi Merebashvili, but Khutsishvili started having health problems that season and after being diagnosticated with heart problems he ended abandoning his playing career in 2010.

After retiring he became as head scout of Vojvodina for 6 month. Next half year he became sports director of Dila Gori and then became general director of FC Zestaponi for four years before moving in autumn 2015 to hold the same direction position at Georgian giants FC Dinamo Tbilisi.

== Honours ==
Sioni Bolnisi

- Umaglesi Liga: 2005–06

Dinamo Tbilisi

- Umaglesi Liga: 1997–98, 2007–08

Individual

- Umaglesi Liga top scorer: 2007–08
