= Tatanashvili =

Tatanashvili (Georgian: ტატანაშვილი) is a Georgian surname. Notable people with the surname include:

- Dimitri Tatanashvili (born 1983), Georgian footballer
- Evstafii Tatanashvili (1902–1958), Soviet Air Force general
