= 2008–09 Pirveli Liga =

Football league season

Pirveli Liga
- Season: 2008–09
- Champions: Samtredia
- Promoted: Samtredia; Baia Zugdidi

The 2008–09 Pirveli Liga was the 20th season of the Georgian Pirveli Liga, the second division of Georgian football. It consists of 22 teams with four of them being reserve teams. Although reserve teams are allowed to play in the same league system, they were not allowed to play in the same division and therefore cannot be promoted.

Samtredia and Baia Zugdidi secured promotion at the end of the season.

== East Group ==
=== Teams ===
Club	City	Stadium	Capacity	2007–08 season
Ameri	Tbilisi			5th in Umaglesi Liga
Chikhura	Sachkhere			Pirveli Liga Champions
Dila	Gori			14th in Umaglesi Liga
Dinamo-2	Tbilisi			Pirveli Liga East Runner-up
Gagra-2	Tbilisi / Gagra			9th in Meore Liga Centre
Hereti	Lagodekhi			5th in Meore Liga East
Kakheti	Telavi			7th in Pirveli Liga East
Norchi Dinamoeli	Tbilisi			10th in Pirveli Liga East
Sioni-2	Bolnisi			4th in Meore Liga East
FC Tbilisi	Tbilisi			6th in Pirveli Liga East
WIT Georgia-2	Tbilisi			3rd in Pirveli Liga East

=== Table ===
Pos	Team	Pld	W	D	L	GF	GA	GD	Pts	Relegation
1	Ameri Tbilisi (C, R)	30	21	5	4	56	16	+40	68	Withdrew from the league
2	Chikhura Sachkhere	30	19	7	4	56	22	+34	64	
3	WIT Georgia-2 Tbilisi (R)	30	18	6	6	50	18	+32	60	Reserve teams demoted from the league
4	Dinamo-2 Tbilisi (R)	30	17	9	4	59	25	+34	60	Reserve teams demoted from the league
5	Dila Gori (R)	30	12	9	9	48	31	+17	45	Withdrew from the league
6	Tbilisi (R)	30	12	6	12	55	45	+10	42	Withdrew from the league
7	Hereti Lagodekhi	30	8	8	14	34	55	−21	32	
8	Sioni-2 Bolnisi (R)	30	8	6	16	35	64	−29	30	Reserve teams demoted from the league
9	Gagra-2 (R)	30	8	3	19	38	58	−20	27	Reserve teams demoted from the league
10	Norchi Dinamoeli Tbilisi	30	3	7	20	28	72	−44	16	
11	Kakheti Telavi (R)	30	3	6	21	21	74	−53	15	Relegation to Meore Liga

Source: RSSSF
(C) Champions; (R) Relegated

== West Group ==
Pos	Team	Pld	W	D	L	GF	GA	GD	Pts	Promotion or relegation
1	Samtredia (C, P)	30	21	3	6	56	23	+33	66	Promotion to Umaglesi Liga
2	Baia Zugdidi (P)	30	19	6	5	58	20	+38	63	Promotion to Umaglesi Liga
3	Merani Martvili	30	18	6	6	45	24	+21	60	
4	Torpedo–2008 Kutaisi	30	14	3	13	32	22	+10	45	
5	Kolkheti Poti	30	13	6	11	45	40	+5	45	
6	Chiatura	30	12	3	15	38	48	−10	39	
7	Khobi	30	11	3	16	30	47	−17	36	
8	Dinamo Batumi	30	9	9	12	33	42	−9	36	
9	Guria Lanchkhuti	30	10	5	15	38	49	−11	35	
10	Zestafoni-2 (R)	30	7	6	17	28	47	−19	27	Reserve teams demoted from the league
11	Meshakhte Tkibuli	30	4	4	22	20	61	−41	16	

Source: RSSSF
(C) Champions; (P) Promoted; (R) Relegated

== See also ==
- 2008–09 Umaglesi Liga
- 2008–09 Georgian Cup
