= 2005–06 Umaglesi Liga =

Umaglesi Liga
- Season: 2005–06
- Dates: 30 July 2005 – 9 May 2006
- Champions: Sioni Bolnisi; 1st Georgian title
- Relegated: Dinamo Sokhumi; Spartaki Tbilisi; Kolkheti Poti; Tskhinvali
- Champions League: Sioni Bolnisi
- UEFA Cup: WIT Georgia; Ameri Tbilisi
- Intertoto Cup: Dinamo Tbilisi
- Matches played: 240
- Goals scored: 599 (2.5 per match)
- Top goalscorer: Jaba Dvali (21)
- Biggest home win: Sioni 6–1 Tskhinvali; Dila 5–0 Dinamo Sokhumi; Borjomi 5–0 Spartaki; Dinamo Batumi 5–0 Spartaki; Dinamo Tbilisi 5–0 Kolkheti
- Biggest away win: Spartaki 0–6 Locomotive
- Highest scoring: Sioni 6–1 Tskhinvali; Dinamo Sokhumi 1–6 Dinamo Tbilisi

The 2005–06 Umaglesi Liga was the seventeenth season of top-tier football in Georgia. It began on 30 July 2005 and ended on 9 May 2006. Dinamo Tbilisi were the defending champions.

== Locations ==
Locations of teams in 2005–06 Umaglesi Liga

== League standings ==
Pos	Team	Pld	W	D	L	GF	GA	GD	Pts	Qualification or relegation
1	Sioni Bolnisi (C)	30	23	4	3	57	17	+40	73	Qualification for the Champions League first qualifying round
2	WIT Georgia	30	21	5	4	53	17	+36	68	Qualification for the UEFA Cup first qualifying round
3	Dinamo Tbilisi	30	20	4	6	61	22	+39	64	Qualification for the Intertoto Cup first round
4	Zestaponi	30	18	7	5	44	22	+22	61	
5	Borjomi	30	19	2	9	50	26	+24	59	
6	Dinamo Batumi	30	17	7	6	42	21	+21	58	
7	Ameri Tbilisi	30	15	4	11	32	26	+6	49	Qualification for the UEFA Cup first qualifying round (Note: Ameri Tbilisi won the 2005–06 Georgian Cup and thereby qualified for the first qualifying round of the UEFA Cup.)
8	Locomotive Tbilisi	30	11	4	15	41	48	−7	37	
9	Kakheti Telavi	30	10	4	16	33	46	−13	34	
10	Kolkheti-1913 Poti (Note: Kolkheti-1913 Poti were originally staying up, but were relegated due to financial irregularities.) (R)	30	9	5	16	26	36	−10	32	Relegation to Meore Liga
11	Dila Gori	30	9	4	17	35	44	−9	31	
12	Torpedo Kutaisi	30	8	6	16	28	42	−14	30	
13	FC Tbilisi (Note: After the season, FC Tbilisi were merged with FC Rustavi and in the following season they were competed as Olimpi Rustavi.) (O)	30	9	2	19	29	44	−15	29	Qualification to Relegation play-offs
14	Tskhinvali (Note: Tskhinvali were relegated due to financial reasons despite winning the relegation playoffs.) (O, R)	30	8	3	19	30	61	−31	27	Qualification to Relegation play-offs
15	Dinamo Sokhumi (Note: Dinamo Sokhumi have like, a terrible financial situation. So, they were relegated to the lower divisions for bankruptcy.) (R)	30	5	3	22	26	70	−44	18	Relegation to Pirveli Liga
16	Spartaki Tbilisi (R)	30	3	6	21	12	57	−45	15	Relegation to Pirveli Liga

Source: rsssf.org
Rules for classification: 1st points; 2nd matches won; 3rd head-to-head
(C) Champions; (O) Play-off winners; (R) Relegated

== Results ==
Home \ Away	AME	BOR	DIL	DBA	DSU	DIN	KAK	KOL	LOC	SIO	STB	TBI	TKU	TSK	WIT	ZES
Ameri Tbilisi		1–0	1–0	0–1	1–0	1–1	0–0	1–0	4–1	0–1	1–0	0–2	5–1	1–0	1–2	2–0
Borjomi	2–1		4–3	0–1	3–0	4–2	2–1	1–0	2–0	1–0	5–0	2–0	1–0	4–0	1–0	1–0
Dila Gori	0–1	2–0		2–0	5–0	0–2	4–2	1–0	0–0	0–2	1–0	3–0	2–0	4–2	1–3	0–1
Dinamo Batumi	1–0	1–0	3–1		4–0	1–2	1–0	2–0	0–1	0–1	5–0	1–0	2–0	0–0	1–1	2–2
Dinamo Sokhumi	0–3	1–3	1–1	2–1		1–6	2–0	1–0	4–1	1–2	0–0	0–2	0–3	0–2	0–1	0–1
Dinamo Tbilisi	1–2	1–2	4–1	3–1	4–0		1–0	5–0	1–0	3–0	3–0	1–0	2–1	1–0	0–0	2–2
Kakheti Telavi	1–2	1–0	3–0	1–3	3–1	1–3		3–2	4–3	0–2	1–0	1–1	1–0	4–0	0–1	1–0
Kolkheti-1913 Poti	0–1	0–0	2–1	0–1	4–0	0–0	2–2		4–1	0–1	1–0	2–1	1–0	3–0	1–0	1–2
Locomotive Tbilisi	3–0	2–1	2–1	1–2	1–0	0–3	3–0	2–0		1–1	3–1	1–4	2–3	3–0	1–2	0–0
Sioni Bolnisi	3–0	1–0	2–0	2–2	1–0	1–0	4–1	2–0	4–0		1–0	4–0	3–1	6–1	1–0	1–0
Spartaki Tbilisi	1–1	3–2	1–0	0–0	0–1	0–3	0–0	0–0	0–6	1–1		1–0	1–2	1–3	1–4	1–3
FC Tbilisi	0–0	0–5	2–0	1–3	4–3	2–3	3–0	1–0	0–2	1–2	1–0		2–1	0–2	0–1	0–1
Torpedo Kutaisi	0–1	0–2	0–0	0–1	4–2	0–2	1–0	0–0	0–0	0–4	1–0	1–0		4–1	2–2	2–3
Tskhinvali	1–0	1–2	2–2	1–2	4–3	0–2	0–1	1–3	2–1	1–3	2–0	3–0	0–0		0–3	0–2
WIT Georgia	3–1	4–0	2–0	0–0	2–2	1–0	1–0	3–0	2–0	2–1	2–0	2–1	1–0	3–0		1–2
Zestaponi	1–0	0–0	2–0	0–0	4–1	1–0	4–0	3–0	3–0	0–0	1–0	2–1	1–1	3–1	0–4	

Source: rsssf.org
Legend: Blue = home team win; Yellow = draw; Red = away team win.

== Relegation play-offs ==
14 May 2006

FC Tbilisi	4 – 1	Meshakre Agara

15 May 2006

FC Tskhinvali	2 – 1 (a.e.t.)	Gagra

== Top goalscorers ==
Rank	Goalscorer	Team	Goals
1	(Georgia (country)) Jaba Dvali	Dinamo Tbilisi	21
2	(Georgia (country)) Koka Mikuchadze	Sioni Bolnisi	19
3	(Georgia (country)) Zurab Ionanidze	Zestaponi	17

== See also ==
- 2005–06 Pirveli Liga
- 2005–06 Georgian Cup
