= Gia Chkhaidze =

Georgian footballer

Personal information
- Date of birth: 27 February 1970 (age 56)
- Place of birth: Lanchkhuti, Soviet Union
- Height: 1.82 m (6 ft 0 in)
- Position: Defender

Senior career*
Years	Team	Apps	(Gls)
1987	FC Dinamo Tbilisi	0	(0)
1988	SC EShVSM Moscow	1	(0)
1988	FC Torpedo Kutaisi	27	(0)
1989	Mertskhali Makharadze	18	(1)
1990–1993	FC Guria Lanchkhuti	104	(2)
1993–1994	FC Kolkheti-1913 Poti	28	(1)
1994–1996	FC Samtredia	53	(2)
1996–1997	FC Dinamo Tbilisi	22	(2)
1998–1999	FC Torpedo Kutaisi	25	(0)
1999	FC Alania Vladikavkaz	9	(0)
1999–2000	FC Lokomotivi Tbilisi	11	(0)
2000	FC Torpedo Kutaisi	11	(0)
2001	Merani-91 Tbilisi	8	(0)
2001–2002	FC Dinamo Batumi	19	(0)
2002–2003	FC Sioni Bolnisi	21	(0)
2003	FC Milani Tsnori	5	(0)
2003–2005	FC Chikhura Sachkhere		
2005–2006	FC Dinamo Sokhumi	13	(0)
2006–2007	FC Meshakre Agara		

International career
1998–1999	Georgia	3	(0)
- * Club domestic league appearances and goals

Gia Chkhaidze (Georgian: გია ჩხაიძე; born 27 February 1970) is a Georgian former footballer.

Chkhaidze played twice for Georgia in 1999, once against Ukraine in a friendly and once against Slovenia in UEFA Euro 2000 qualifying.
