= 2006–07 Umaglesi Liga =

Football tournament edition

Umaglesi Liga
- Season: 2006–07
- Dates: 26 July 2006 – 20 May 2007
- Champions: Olimpi Rustavi; 1st Georgian title
- Relegated: Kakheti Telavi; Torpedo Kutaisi; Chikhura Sachkhere
- Champions League: Olimpi Rustavi
- UEFA Cup: Dinamo Tbilisi; Ameri Tbilisi
- Intertoto Cup: Zestaponi
- Matches played: 182
- Goals scored: 470 (2.58 per match)
- Top goalscorer: Sandro Iashvili (27)
- Biggest home win: Olimpi 7–0 Kakheti; Zestaponi 7–0 Kakheti
- Biggest away win: Kakheti 1–7 Ameri; Dila 0–6 WIT; Merani 0–6 Ameri
- Highest scoring: Kakheti 1–7 Ameri

The 2006–07 Umaglesi Liga was the eighteenth season of top-tier football in Georgia. It began on 26 July 2006 and ended on 20 May 2007. Sioni Bolnisi were the defending champions.

== Locations ==
Location of teams in 2006–07 Umaglesi Liga

== League standings ==
Pos	Team	Pld	W	D	L	GF	GA	GD	Pts	Qualification or relegation
1	Olimpi Rustavi (C)	26	19	6	1	57	9	+48	63	Qualification for the Champions League first qualifying round
2	Dinamo Tbilisi	26	20	2	4	57	19	+38	62	Qualification for the UEFA Cup first qualifying round
3	Ameri Tbilisi	26	17	6	3	53	14	+39	57	Qualification for the UEFA Cup first qualifying round
4	Zestaponi	26	16	9	1	55	11	+44	57	Qualification for the Intertoto Cup first round
5	WIT Georgia	26	12	9	5	40	28	+12	45	
6	Sioni Bolnisi	26	11	4	11	28	26	+2	37	
7	Torpedo Kutaisi (R)	26	9	4	13	24	35	−11	31	Relegation to Pirveli Liga (Note: Torpedo Kutaisi and Chikhura Sachkhere relegated due to financial reasons. Their place were placed by Dila Gori and Spartaki Tskhinvali)
8	Locomotive Tbilisi	26	8	6	12	25	34	−9	30 (Note: Head-to-head points: Locomotive Tbilisi 8, Dinamo Batumi 4, Borjomi 3.)	
9	Dinamo Batumi	26	8	6	12	27	30	−3	30	
10	Borjomi	26	8	6	12	29	35	−6	30	
11	Merani Tbilisi	26	6	8	12	20	41	−21	26	
12	Chikhura Sachkhere (R, O)	26	5	6	15	13	46	−33	21	Qualification to Relegation play-offs
13	Dila Gori	26	3	6	17	21	56	−35	15	Relegation to Pirveli Liga
14	Kakheti Telavi (R)	26	0	2	24	21	86	−65	2	Relegation to Pirveli Liga

Source: rsssf.org
Rules for classification: 1st points; 2nd matches won; 3rd head-to-head
(C) Champions; (O) Play-off winners; (R) Relegated

== Results ==
Home \ Away	AME	BOR	CHI	DIL	DBA	DIN	KTL	LOC	MER	OLI	SIO	TKU	WIT	ZES
Ameri Tbilisi		2–0	2–0	2–1	0–0	2–0	3–0	3–0	6–0	2–2	1–0	1–0	3–0	1–1
Borjomi	1–0		3–1	1–0	0–0	0–2	4–1	1–1	3–4	0–4	2–0	5–1	2–2	1–2
Chikhura Sachkhere	0–2	1–0		1–1	1–0	0–5	3–1	1–1	1–0	0–4	0–1	0–0	0–1	0–0
Dila Gori	1–4	0–3	5–0		0–0	1–2	3–1	1–1	0–1	0–1	0–1	1–0	0–6	0–4
Dinamo Batumi	0–1	1–0	3–0	2–1		1–3	3–2	0–1	3–0	1–2	1–2	2–0	0–1	0–0
Dinamo Tbilisi	2–1	3–0	3–1	6–1	4–2		2–1	1–0	3–0	1–0	1–0	0–1	1–0	2–2
Kakheti Telavi	1–7	0–2	0–1	2–2	1–3	2–3		1–5	0–1	0–5	1–1	2–3	2–3	0–2
Locomotive Tbilisi	0–1	0–0	0–0	3–0	1–0	0–3	1–0		3–1	0–1	3–1	0–3	0–3	1–4
Merani Tbilisi	0–4	0–0	0–0	0–0	1–1	1–3	3–1	1–1		0–1	0–3	2–0	0–0	0–3
Olimpi Rustavi	0–0	2–0	5–0	5–1	2–1	0–0	7–0	1–0	1–0		3–0	1–0	4–0	1–1
Sioni Bolnisi	1–1	2–0	2–0	3–0	1–2	0–1	5–0	1–0	0–3	0–1		1–0	1–0	0–0
Torpedo Kutaisi	0–1	2–1	2–0	2–0	2–1	0–5	2–1	1–3	3–1	2–4	0–0		0–0	0–1
WIT Georgia	4–3	0–0	3–2	1–1	0–0	2–1	5–1	3–0	0–0	0–0	3–2	0–0		3–0
Zestaponi	0–0	4–0	2–0	4–1	4–0	1–0	7–0	2–0	1–1	0–0	3–0	2–0	5–0	

Source: rsssf.org
Legend: Blue = home team win; Yellow = draw; Red = away team win.

== Relegation play-offs ==
27 May 2007

Chikhura Sachkhere	2 – 1 (a.e.t.)	Gagra

== See also ==
- 2006–07 in Georgian football
- 2006–07 Pirveli Liga
- 2006–07 Georgian Cup
