= Aleksandr Kaidarashvili =

Georgian footballer

Personal information
- Date of birth: 2 November 1978 (age 47)
- Place of birth: Tbilisi, Georgian SSR
- Height: 1.81 m (5 ft 11 1/2 in)
- Position: Striker

Senior career*
Years	Team	Apps	(Gls)
1994–1997	FC Dila Gori	47	(8)
1998	Odishi Zugdidi	14	(1)
1998	FC Torpedo Kutaisi	0	(0)
1998–1999	FC Dila Gori	12	(9)
1999	FC Nyva Ternopil	24	(6)
2000	FC Kryvbas Kryvyi Rih	13	(1)
2000	→ FC Kryvbas-2 Kryvyi Rih	9	(0)
2001–2003	FC Lokomotivi Tbilisi	55	(9)
2003	FC Dila Gori	15	(9)
2004–2006	FC Ameri Tbilisi	65	(13)
2006–2007	FC Borjomi	12	(1)
2007	FC Meskheti Akhaltsikhe	9	(3)
2008	FC Lokomotivi Tbilisi	0	(0)

International career
1998	Georgia	1	(0)
- * Club domestic league appearances and goals

Aleksandr Kaidarashvili (born 2 November 1978 in Tbilisi) is a Georgian former professional footballer.
