= Dimitri Tatanashvili =

Georgian footballer

Personal information
- Full name: Dimitri Tatanashvili
- Date of birth: 19 October 1983 (age 43)
- Place of birth: Tbilisi, Georgia
- Height: 1.86 m (6 ft 1 in)
- Position: Forward

Youth career
- 1993–1999: Olimpik Tbilisi

Senior career*
Years	Team	Apps	(Gls)
1999–2002	Olimpik Tbilisi	16	(3)
2003–2005	Spartaki Tskhinvali	70	(27)
2005–2008	Ameri Tbilisi	58	(25)
2008–2010	Viktoria Plzeň	19	(1)
2009–2010	→ SK Kladno (loan)	22	(4)
2010–2011	Metalurh Zaporizhya	10	(1)
2011	Dinamo Tbilisi	15	(4)
2011–2013	Metalurgi Rustavi	55	(19)
2013	Dinamo Tbilisi	11	(2)
2013–2014	Chikhura Sachkhere	16	(12)
2014	Zestafoni	13	(3)
2014–2015	Dinamo Batumi	22	(5)
2015–2016	Sioni Bolnisi	27	(14)
2016–2017	Chikhura Sachkhere	41	(19)
2018	Saburtalo Tbilisi	20	(6)
2019	Telavi	15	(4)
2019	Sioni Bolnisi	14	(4)
2020	Shukura	9	(2)
2021	Tbilisi City		
2022	Kolkheti 1913		
2023	Aragvi		

International career
2007	Georgia	2	(1)
- * Club domestic league appearances and goals as of 18 April 2025

Dimitri Tatanashvili (Georgian: დიმიტრი ტატანაშვილი; born 19 October 1983) is a Georgian football player who played as a forward. Tatanashvili is the two-time Georgian top-flight winner. He is a member of the 100 club comprising the Georgian players with a hundred or more goals.

== Club career ==
Tatanashvili made first headlines in mid-2000s. He won first titles of his career in 2006 when Ameri secured the Georgian Cup and Super Cup.

Tatanashvili represented five Georgian clubs in European football. He scored his debut goal for Ameri against Polish side Bełchatów in 2007. Later in 2012, Tatanashvili netted four times in three UEFA Europa League ties for Metalurgi. His last goal came in 2017, when he equalized for Chikhura in 1–1 draw at Altach.

Tatanashvili secured his first league title with Dinamo Tbilisi in 2013. He joined the 100 club on 16 June 2017 when Chikhura defeated Kolkheti 1913 due to his hat-trick.

At the age of 40, Tatanashvili ended his long career at Liga 3 club Aragvi after the 2023 season. He scored 116 goals in 318 top-tier appearances.

== International career ==
Tatanashvili has made one appearance for the Georgia national football team, a friendly against Azerbaijan on 12 September 2007.

== Honours ==
Umaglesi / Erovnuli Liga: 2012–13, 2018

Georgian Cup: 2005–06, 2006–07, 2012–13, 2017

Georgian Supercup: 2006, 2007, 2013

Czech Cup: 2009–10
