= 2009–10 Pirveli Liga =

Football league season

Pirveli Liga
- Season: 2009–10
- Champions: Torpedo Kutaisi
- Promoted: Torpedo Kutaisi; Kolkheti Poti
- Relegated: IBSU; 35th School; Hereti Lagodekhi; Meskheti Akhaltsikhe

2009–10 Pirveli Liga was the 21st season of the Georgian Pirveli Liga.

Torpedo Kutaisi won the league and were promoted along with runners-up Kolkheti Poti at the end of the season.

== Standings ==
Pos	Team	Pld	W	D	L	GF	GA	GD	Pts	Promotion or relegation
1	Torpedo Kutaisi (C, P)	28	22	4	2	70	12	+58	70	Promotion to Umaglesi Liga
2	Kolkheti Poti (P)	28	19	4	5	63	21	+42	61	Promotion to Umaglesi Liga
3	Merani Martvili	28	17	2	9	44	31	+13	53	
4	Guria	28	16	5	7	53	32	+21	53	
5	Dinamo Batumi	28	15	8	5	44	17	+27	53	
6	Chikhura	28	14	7	7	41	28	+13	49	
7	IBSU (R)	28	9	7	12	45	40	+5	34	Relegation to Meore Liga
8	Norchi Dinamoeli	28	9	5	14	38	57	−19	32	
9	Mertskhali	28	9	4	15	29	45	−16	31	
10	Kolkheti Khobi	28	9	3	16	36	52	−16	30	
11	Chiatura	28	9	3	16	36	58	−22	30	
12	Meshakhte Tkibuli	28	6	7	15	36	68	−32	25	
13	35th School (R)	28	6	6	16	30	49	−19	24	Relegation to Meore Liga
14	Hereti Lagodekhi (R)	28	6	5	17	27	60	−33	23	Relegation to Meore Liga
15	Meskheti Akhaltsikhe (R)	28	7	4	17	26	48	−22	22 (Note: Meskheti Akhaltsikhe were deducted three points.)	Relegation to Meore Liga

Source: RSSSF
(C) Champions; (P) Promoted; (R) Relegated

== Top scorers ==
Rank	Goalscorer	Team	Goals
1	(Georgia (country)) Giga Kverenchkhiladze	Guria	19
2	(Georgia (country)) Davit Tsitskhvaia	Kolkheti Poti	17
3	(Georgia (country)) Revaz Kvernadze	Torpedo Kutaisi	14

== See also ==
- 2009–10 Umaglesi Liga
- 2009–10 Georgian Cup
