= Sevasti Todua =

Georgian footballer

Personal information
- Date of birth: 13 May 1976 (age 50)
- Place of birth: Abasha, Georgian SSR
- Height: 1.85 m (6 ft 1 in)
- Position: Defender

Senior career*
Years	Team	Apps	(Gls)
1997–1999	FC Iberia Samtredia	37	(2)
1999–2000	FC WIT Georgia	22	(0)
2000	FC Lokomotivi Tbilisi	16	(0)
2001–2002	FC Torpedo Kutaisi	45	(0)
2002	FC Uralan Elista	6	(0)
2003–2004	FC Torpedo Kutaisi	60	(0)
2005–2009	FC Zestaponi	106	(1)
2009–2010	FC Olimpi Rustavi	17	(0)
2010	FC Baia Zugdidi	17	(0)
2010–2012	FC Torpedo Kutaisi	62	(0)
2012	FC Metalurgi Rustavi	14	(0)
2012–2013	FC Zugdidi	22	(0)
2013	FC Guria Lanchkhuti	19	(0)
2013	FC Dinamo Batumi	16	(0)
2014	FC Torpedo Kutaisi	15	(0)
2015–2016	FC Sulori Vani	8	(0)
2016–2018	Merani Tbilisi		
2019	Borjomi		
2020	FC Didube 2014 Tbilisi		

International career
2000–2001	Georgia	6	(0)
- * Club domestic league appearances and goals

Sevasti Todua (Georgian: სევასტი თოდუა; born 13 May 1976) is a Georgian former professional footballer who made six appearances for the Georgia national team.
