= Zurab Popkhadze =

Georgian footballer

Personal information
- Full name: Zurab Popkhadze
- Date of birth: 2 June 1972
- Place of birth: Lagodekhi
- Date of death: 15 January 2013 (aged 40)
- Height: 1.84 m (6 ft 1/2 in)
- Position: Defender

Senior career*
Years	Team	Apps	(Gls)
1990–1991	FC Hereti Lagodekhi	36	(21)
1991–1992	FC Kakheti Telavi	34	(0)
1992–1994	FC Alazani Gurjaani	52	(0)
1994–1996	FC Metalurgi Rustavi	47	(5)
1997–2000	FC Krylia Sovetov Samara	81	(3)
2000	FC Lokomotiv Nizhny Novgorod	12	(1)
2001	FC Alania Vladikavkaz	5	(0)
2002–2003	FC Kryvbas Kryvyi Rih	21	(0)
2004	FC Metallurg-Kuzbass Novokuznetsk	10	(0)
2008–2009	FC Hereti Lagodekhi	1	(0)

International career
1998–1999	Georgia	4	(0)
- * Club domestic league appearances and goals

Zurab Popkhadze (Georgian: ზურაბ ფოფხაძე; 2 June 1972 – 15 January 2013) was a Georgian professional footballer. He made his professional debut in the Meore Liga in 1990 for FC Hereti Lagodekhi. He also won four caps for the Georgia national football team.

Popkhadze died on 15 January 2013, committing suicide by hanging.
