= Zaal Eliava =

Georgian footballer

Zaali Eliava
Personal information
- Full name: Zaali Eliava
- Date of birth: 2 January 1985 (age 41)
- Place of birth: Tbilisi, Soviet Union
- Height: 1.77 m (5 ft 10 in)
- Position: Defender

Senior career*
Years	Team	Apps	(Gls)
2002–2003	Merani Tbilisi	27	(1)
2003–2005	FC Tbilisi	41	(0)
2005–2008	Skonto Riga	49	(0)
2008–2009	Lokomotivi Tbilisi	10	(0)
2009	Dinamo Tbilisi	10	(0)
2009–2013	Zestaponi	137	(3)
2013	Sioni Bolnisi	16	(0)
2013–2014	Sasco Tbilisi	4	(0)
2014	Torpedo Kutaisi	11	(0)
2015	Sasco Tbilisi	17	(2)
2015	Dinamo Zugdidi	3	(0)
2016	Mertskhali Ozurgeti	12	(0)
2016–2017	Merani Tbilisi		
2019	FC Varketili		

International career
2005	Georgia U-21	1	(0)
2006–2008	Georgia	8	(0)
- * Club domestic league appearances and goals

Zaali Eliava (Georgian: ზაალ ელიავა; born 2 January 1985) is a retired football defender from Georgia.

== Playing career ==
2004-05	FC Tbilisi	Umaglesi Liga	16/0*
2005	Skonto FC Rīga	Virslīga 1st level	28/0
2006	Skonto FC Rīga	LMT Virslīga 1st level	8/0
2007	Skonto FC Rīga	LMT Virslīga 1st level	13/0
2008	Skonto FC Rīga	LMT Virslīga 1st level	0/0
2008-09	FC Lokomotivi Tbilisi	Umaglesi Liga	10/0
2008-09	FC Dinamo Tbilisi	Umaglesi Liga	10/0
2009-10	FC Zestaponi	Umaglesi Liga	36/1
2010-11	FC Zestaponi	Umaglesi Liga	18/0

* - played games and goals
