= Giorgi Nergadze =

Georgian footballer

Personal information
- Date of birth: 20 August 1982 (age 44)
- Place of birth: Tskaltubo, Georgia
- Height: 1.83 m (6 ft 0 in)
- Position: Midfielder

Team information
- Current team: Torpedo Kutaisi
- Number: 5

Senior career*
Years	Team	Apps	(Gls)
1999–2002	FC Interi Kutaisi	64	(8)
2002–2003	FC Samgurali Tskaltubo	15	(4)
2003–2005	FC Torpedo Kutaisi	66	(11)
2005–2010	FC Dinamo Tbilisi	33	(3)
2007	→ FC Dinamo Batumi (loan)	12	(3)
2007	→ FC Borjomi (loan)	12	(1)
2010–2014	Moroka Swallows	108	(7)
2014–2015	Bidvest Wits	4	(0)
2015–	Torpedo Kutaisi	28	(1)
- * Club domestic league appearances and goals as of 27 January 2017

Giorgi Nergadze (Georgian: გიორგი ნერგაძე; born 20 August 1982) is a Georgian football player. He is a midfielder and plays for Bidvest Wits in the South African Premier Soccer League. He now has a wife and kids, the kids names are Gigi and Nikoloz, he now lives in Georgia, Kutaisi.
