= Vakhtang Khvadagiani =

Georgian footballer

Personal information
- Date of birth: 4 April 1972 (age 54)
- Place of birth: Tbilisi, Soviet Union
- Height: 1.91 m (6 ft 3 in)
- Position: Defender

Senior career*
Years	Team	Apps	(Gls)
1988	Shevardeni Tbilisi	1	(0)
1989	FC Dinamo Tbilisi	0	(0)
1990–1991	Krtsanisi Tbilisi	27	(3)
1991–1992	Imedi Tbilisi	29	(3)
1992–1994	Antsi Tbilisi	55	(2)
1994	Shevardeni-1906 Tbilisi	7	(0)
1995	Veres Rivne	11	(0)
1995–1996	FC Samtredia	19	(0)
1996–1997	Torpedo Kutaisi	10	(2)
1997	Kolkheti-1913 Poti	0	(0)
1998–2001	FC Torpedo Kutaisi	72	(3)
2001	FC Sokol Saratov (reserves)		
2001–2003	FC Torpedo Kutaisi	70	(2)
2004	PAS Giannina F.C.	3	(0)
2004–2008	FC Ameri Tbilisi	87	(4)

International career
1998	Georgia	1	(0)
- * Club domestic league appearances and goals

Vakhtang Khvadagiani (Georgian: ვახტანგ ხვადაგიანი; born 4 April 1972) is a retired Georgian footballer.
