= Awaka Ashta =

Ethiopian footballer

Awaka Ashta אווקה אשטה
Personal information
- Date of birth: 5 September 1999 (age 27)
- Place of birth: Ethiopia
- Height: 1.77 m (5 ft 10 in)
- Position: Midfielder

Team information
- Current team: Dinamo Batumi
- Number: 6

Youth career
- 2012–2018: Hapoel Katamon

Senior career*
Years	Team	Apps	(Gls)
2018–2020	Hapoel Katamon	56	(2)
2020–2026	Hapoel Jerusalem	163	(7)
2026–	Dinamo Batumi	9	(2)
- * Club domestic league appearances and goals as of 20 June 2026

Awake Ashta (Hebrew: אווקה אשטה; born 5 September 1999) is an Ethiopian professional footballer who plays as a midfielder for Dinamo Batumi.

== Biography ==
Ashta was born in Ethiopia to a Jewish family. He immigrated to Israel at the age of four and grew up in Jerusalem.

On 16 December 2016, he made his senior debut for Hapoel Katamon in a 6–0 loss to Maccabi Ahi Nazareth.

In December 2021, he was sent off in Hapoel Jerusalem's 1–1 draw against Hapoel Tel Aviv.

In 2022, Ashta was invited to join the Ethiopia national team.

In June 2026 he signed a contract until 2028 with Erovnuli Liga club Dinamo Batumi.
