= International Black Sea University =

International Black Sea University (IBSU)
- შავი ზღვის საერთაშორისო უნივერსიტეტი
- Type: Private
- Established: 1995; 31 years ago
- Rector: Gia Kavtelishvili
- Location: 2, David Agmashenebeli Alley 13th km., Tbilisi, 0131, Georgia, Tbilisi, Georgia; 41.7974°N 44.7739°E
- Campus: Urban
- Nickname: IBSU
- Website: www.ibsu.edu.ge

The International Black Sea University (IBSU) (Georgian: შავი ზღვის საერთაშორისო უნივერსიტეტი, romanized: shavi zghvis saertashoriso universit'et'i) was established in 1995 in Tbilisi, Georgia and registered as a legal entity in August 1995. It began operating on the basis of a decree of the Council of Ministers of Georgia and a licence issued by the Ministry of Education of Georgia

International Black Sea University has the objective of training Georgian and foreign students in scientific, technical and professional fields of study, and of using these studies in the fields of pure and applied research for contributing to the economic and social necessities of Georgia and other countries.

The languages of instruction are English and Georgian.

International relations

IBSU takes part in student and staff exchange schemes, including Erasmus+ and bilateral exchange agreements with universities abroad.

Research

The university publishes scientific journals and hosts academic conferences.

== Faculties ==
The university is organised into five schools:

- School of Business
- Law and State Governance School
- School of Education, Humanities and Social Sciences
- School of Computer Science and Architecture
- Medicine School
