= Luka Kapianidze =

Georgian footballer (born 1999)

Personal information
- Date of birth: 10 January 1999 (age 27)
- Place of birth: Georgia
- Height: 1.89 m (6 ft 2 in)
- Position: Defender

Team information
- Current team: Dinamo Batumi
- Number: 4

Youth career
- Dinamo Tbilisi

Senior career*
| Years | Team | Apps | (Gls) |
| 2016–2019 | Dinamo Tbilisi | 4 | (0) |
| 2019 | → Tskhinvali (loan) | 3 | (0) |
| 2020–2021 | Torpedo | 19 | (2) |
| 2022– | Dinamo Batumi | 75 | (13) |

International career^{‡}
| 2015–2016 | Georgia U17 | 6 | (0) |
| 2020 | Georgia U21 | 1 | (0) |
- * Club domestic league appearances and goals as of 12 July 2026 ‡ National team caps and goals as of 7 April 2025

Luka Kapianidze (Georgian: ლუკა ქაფიანიძე, born 10 January 1999) is a Georgian footballer who plays as a defender for Erovnuli Liga club Dinamo Batumi.

Kapianidze is the winner of the Erovnuli Liga and the Supercup.

== Career ==
Kapianidze grew up as a footballer at Dinamo Tbilisi. Despite an insufficient playing time, he was a regular member of the U17 team. Apart from participating in several friendly games, he played in all six matches of the first and elite rounds of 2016 UEFA European Under-17 Championship qualification campaign. Later in 2019, being a member of U21s, Kapianidze came on as a substitute in a UEFA European Championship qualifying game against France.

In 2019, Kapianidze was loaned to 2nd division side Tskhinvali on a season-loan deal . A year later, he moved to Torpedo and scored a winner on his debut game against Locomotive. He was selected by the Erovnuli Liga among best eleven players of 1st half of the 2021 season, but he suffered an injury requiring surgery.

In January 2022, Kapianidze signed for reigning champions Dinamo Batumi. The next year, as his new team secured the league title for the second time in three years, Kapianidze lifted the first trophy of his career.

== Honours ==
Dinamo Batumi

- Erovnuli Liga: 2023
- Super Cup: 2022
