= Andrei Vavilchenkov =

Russian footballer and coach (born 1990)

Personal information
- Full name: Andrei Andreyevich Vavilchenkov
- Date of birth: 28 April 1990 (age 36)
- Place of birth: Sverdlovsk, Russian SFSR
- Height: 1.78 m (5 ft 10 in)
- Position: Midfielder

Youth career
- 2002: FC Rotor Volgograd
- 2003: FC Spartak Moscow
- 2004–2006: FC Lokomotiv Moscow

Senior career*
Years	Team	Apps	(Gls)
2007–2008	FC Lokomotiv Moscow	0	(0)
2009	FC Lokomotiv-2 Moscow	5	(0)
2010	FC Ural Yekaterinburg	7	(0)
2011	FC Sheriff-2 Tiraspol	1	(0)
2012	FC Lokomotiv-2 Moscow	2	(0)
2013	FC Kvazar Moscow		
2014	FC Shkola Myacha Moscow		

Managerial career
- 2023–2024: FC Spartak Kostroma (assistant)
- * Club domestic league appearances and goals

Andrei Andreyevich Vavilchenkov (Russian: Андрей Андреевич Вавилченков; born 28 April 1990) is a Russian professional football coach and a former player.

== Club career ==
He made his Russian Football National League debut for FC Ural Yekaterinburg on 24 May 2010 in a game against FC Volga Nizhny Novgorod. That was his only season in the FNL.
