= Temuri Shonia =

Georgian footballer

Temur Shonia
Personal information
- Date of birth: 28 May 1990 (age 36)
- Place of birth: Tbilisi, Georgian SSR, Soviet Union
- Height: 1.83 m (6 ft 0 in)
- Position: Central midfielder

Team information
- Current team: Locomotive Tbilisi

Youth career
- 2007–2009: Dinamo Tbilisi

Senior career*
Years	Team	Apps	(Gls)
2009–2014	Spartaki Tskhinvali	154	(27)
2014–2017	Dinamo Batumi	98	(23)
2018–2021	Locomotive Tbilisi	115	(21)
2022–2023	Gagra	68	(10)
2024	Sioni	27	(2)
2025–2026	Meshakhte	53	(5)
2026–	Locomotive Tbilisi	0	(0)

International career^{‡}
2006–2007	Georgia U17	3	(2)
2007–2008	Georgia U19	10	(2)
2008–2009	Georgia U21	4	(0)
2017	Georgia	2	(1)
- * Club domestic league appearances and goals as of 10 July 2026 ‡ National team caps and goals as of 29 August 2020

Temur Shonia (Georgian: თემურ შონია; born 28 May 1990) is a Georgian football player, currently playing for Liga 3 club Locomotive Tbilisi as a central midfielder.

== Club career ==
Shonia began his career in Spartaki Tskhinvali. He later moved to Dinamo Batumi and became the captain of the club. He was a regular member of the Georgia's youth national sides.

== International ==
He made his debut for the Georgia national football team on 23 January 2017 in a friendly against Uzbekistan, scoring one of the two goals of the team.
