= Revaz Chiteishvili =

Georgian association football player

Personal information
- Date of birth: 30 January 1994 (age 32)
- Place of birth: Georgia
- Height: 1.74 m (5 ft 9 in)
- Position: Defender

Team information
- Current team: Dinamo Batumi
- Number: 35

Senior career*
Years	Team	Apps	(Gls)
2011–2013	Locomotive	18	(1)
2013	Torpedo	1	(0)
2014–2017	Locomotive	78	(2)
2018–2019	Chikhura	53	(0)
2020–2023	Dila	100	(3)
2024	Alashkert	13	(1)
2024–	Dinamo Batumi	69	(1)
- * Club domestic league appearances and goals as of 12 July 2026

Revaz "Rezi" Chiteishvili (Georgian: რევაზ ჩიტეიშვილი, born 30 January 1994) is a Georgian footballer who plays as a right back for Erovnuli Liga club Dinamo Batumi.

== Career ==
Chiteishvili started his career at Pirveli Liga club Locomotive, making his debut in a goalless draw against Chkherimela on 19 March 2012. In his fourth season, Locomotive gained promotion to the Erovnuli Liga with Chiteishvili remaining three more years at the club. On 23 February 2016, his long-distance wonder shot against Dinamo Tbilisi was included in top ten goals of the week by some sport outlets.

In 2018, Chiteishvili moved to Georgian Cup winners Chikhura. Two years later, he signed a two-year deal with Dila who would win bronze medals for three consecutive years. Chiteishvili made 119 appearances across all competitions during the four seasons for Dila, including ten games in UEFA European competitions. He was among twelve players who left the club after the 2023 season.

In mid-January 2024, Armenian Premier League side Alashkert signed a six-month deal with Chiteishvili, becoming the first foreign club of his career. As the contract expired, he joined the reigning Georgian champions Dinamo Batumi as a free agent, making his debut in a 3–2 Supercup win over Iberia 1999 on 3 July.
