= Aleksi Benashvili =

Georgian professional football player

Personal information
- Date of birth: 20 March 1989 (age 37)
- Place of birth: Tbilisi, Georgia
- Height: 1.77 m (5 ft 9 1/2 in)
- Position: Midfielder

Team information
- Current team: Shevardeni-1906

Youth career
- FC Tbilisi

Senior career*
Years	Team	Apps	(Gls)
2005–2014	Zestaponi	136	(8)
2014	Merani Martvili	11	(1)
2014	Torpedo Kutaisi	1	(0)
2015	Guria Lanchkhuti	14	(1)
2015–2016	Locomotive Tbilisi	15	(1)
2016	Torpedo Kutaisi	6	(0)
2017	Guria Lanchkhuti	14	(1)
2018–	Shevardeni-1906	0	(0)

International career
2006–2010	Georgia U21	10	(1)
2006–2007	Georgia	2	(0)
- * Club domestic league appearances and goals as of 3 April 2018

Aleksi Benashvili (Georgian: ალექსი ბენაშვილი; born 20 March 1989) is a Georgian professional football player. Currently, he plays for FC Shevardeni-1906 Tbilisi.
