= Nika Kalandarishvili =

Georgian footballer

Personal information
- Date of birth: 9 September 1998 (age 28)
- Place of birth: Georgia
- Height: 1.82 m (6 ft 0 in)
- Position: Left back

Team information
- Current team: Dinamo Batumi
- Number: 19

Youth career
- Dinamo Tbilisi
- Locomotive

Senior career*
Years	Team	Apps	(Gls)
2017	Dila	0	(0)
2018	Althlon Town	11	(2)
2019	Cobinteely	2	(0)
2019	Althlon Town	7	(2)
2021–2024	Samgurali	122	(11)
2025–	Dinamo Batumi	44	(9)
- * Club domestic league appearances and goals as of 12 July 2026

Nika Kalandarishvili (Georgian: ნიკა კალანდარიშვილი; born 9 September 1998) is a Georgian professional football player who plays as a defender for Erovnuli Liga club Dinamo Batumi.

He is the Georgian Cup runner-up with Samgurali.

== Career ==
Kalandarishvili spent his youth career at Dinamo Tbilisi and Locomotive before joining Irish 1st Division club Althlon Town. In the summer of 2020, he returned to Georgia where he signed a three-year deal with newly promoted top-league side Samgurali.

Kalandarishvili made his Erovnuli Liga debut in an opening game of the season against Dinamo Tbilisi on 27 February 2021. He opened his score sheet with a late equalizer against the same opponents in a 2–2 home draw on 3 October 2021. Two months later, he played the Georgian Cup final as his team suffered a narrow defeat to Saburtalo.

The next year Kalandarishvili contributed to Samgurali's fourth-place finish with four goals in 33 league appearances. By the summer break of 2024, the Erovnuli Liga named him in Team of the Season.

In early 2025, Kalandarishvili ended his four-year tenure at Samgurali and moved to Dinamo Batumi. During the first half of the 2026 season, Kalandarishvili displayed rare prolific skills for a defender to score six times and provide three assists in 18 league matches. For his performance, sport outlet Lelo included him in the symbolic league team.

== Career statistics ==
As of match played 23 June 2026

Appearances and goals by club, season and competition
Club	Season	League			National cup		Continental		Other		Total	
Club	Season	Division	Apps	Goals	Apps	Goals	Apps	Goals	Apps	Goals	Apps	Goals
Althlon Town	2018	Irish 1st Division	11	2	1	0	–		–		12	2
Cobinteely	2019	Irish 1st Division	2	0	1	0	–		–		3	0
Althlon Town	2019	Irish 1st Division	7	2	–		–		–		7	2
Althlon Town	Total		18	4	1	0	0	0	0	0	19	4
Samgurali	2021	Erovnuli Liga	29	1	3	0	–		–		32	1
Samgurali	2022	Erovnuli Liga	33	4	–		–		–		33	4
Samgurali	2023	Erovnuli Liga	32	3	3	1	–		–		35	4
Samgurali	2024	Erovnuli Liga	28	3	1	0	–		–		29	3
Samgurali	Total		122	11	7	1	0	0	0	0	129	12
Dinamo Batumi	2025	Erovnuli Liga	26	3	3	0	–		–		29	3
Dinamo Batumi	2026	Erovnuli Liga	18	6	–		–		–		18	6
Dinamo Batumi	Total		44	9	3	0	0	0	0	0	47	9
Career total			186	24	12	1	0	0	0	5	198	25

== Honours ==
- Georgian Cup runner-up: 2021
