= Artem Mylchenko =

Ukrainian footballer

Personal information
- Full name: Artem Serhiyovych Mylchenko
- Date of birth: 22 July 2000 (age 26)
- Place of birth: Komsomolsk, Ukraine
- Height: 1.75 m (5 ft 9 in)
- Position: Central midfielder

Team information
- Current team: Dinamo Batumi
- Number: 6

Youth career
- 2013–2014: Metalist Kharkiv
- 2014: Hirnyk-Sport Komsomolsk
- 2014–2016: Metalist Kharkiv
- 2016–2017: Dynamo Kyiv

Senior career*
Years	Team	Apps	(Gls)
2017–2018	Dynamo Kyiv	0	(0)
2018–2021	Zorya Luhansk	0	(0)
2021–2022	Hirnyk-Sport Horishni Plavni	18	(2)
2022–2023	Lviv	28	(1)
2023	Valmiera	9	(0)
2024–	Dinamo Batumi	59	(2)
- * Club domestic league appearances and goals as of 12 July 2026

Artem Serhiyovych Mylchenko (Ukrainian: Артем Сергійович Мильченко; born 22 July 2000) is a Ukrainian professional footballer who plays as a central midfielder for Georgian club Dinamo Batumi.
