= Evstafii Tatanashvili =

Major-General Tatanashvili

Evstafii Zakharovich Tatanashvili (Georgian: ესტატე ტატანაშვილი; 20 August 1902 – 30 September 1958) was a Soviet Air Force Major general. In 1941 he was the commanding officer of the 60th Mixed Aviation Division. Between 1942 and 1945 he led the 234th Fighter Aviation Division during the Great Patriotic War.
