= 2007–08 Umaglesi Liga =

Umaglesi Liga
- Season: 2007–08
- Dates: 10 August 2007 – 20 May 2008
- Champions: Dinamo Tbilisi; 13th Georgian title
- Relegated: Merani Tbilisi; Dinamo Batumi; Dila Gori
- Champions League: Dinamo Tbilisi
- UEFA Cup: WIT Georgia; Zestaponi
- Intertoto Cup: Olimpi Rustavi
- Matches played: 165
- Goals scored: 448 (2.72 per match)
- Top goalscorer: Mikheil Khutsishvili (16)
- Biggest home win: Ameri 7–0 Merani; Dinamo Tbilisi 7–0 Dinamo Batumi
- Biggest away win: Merani 1–5 Ameri; Merani 0–4 Meshketi
- Highest scoring: Dinamo Tbilisi 6–5 Locomotive

The 2007–08 Umaglesi Liga was the nineteenth season of top-tier football in Georgia. It began on 10 August 2007 and ended on 20 May 2008. Olimpi Rustavi were the defending champions.

== Locations ==
Location of teams in 2007–08 Umaglesi Liga

== League table ==
Pos	Team	Pld	W	D	L	GF	GA	GD	Pts	Qualification or relegation
1	Dinamo Tbilisi (C)	26	23	1	2	67	18	+49	70	Qualification for the Champions League first qualifying round
2	WIT Georgia	26	19	3	4	45	14	+31	60	Qualification for the UEFA Cup first qualifying round
3	Zestaponi	26	18	5	3	56	16	+40	59	Qualification for the UEFA Cup first qualifying round
4	Olimpi Rustavi	26	16	4	6	26	16	+10	52	Qualification for the Intertoto Cup first round
5	Ameri Tbilisi	26	15	3	8	48	27	+21	48	
6	Meskheti Akhaltsikhe	26	11	6	9	29	30	−1	39	
7	Mglebi Zugdidi	26	10	3	13	27	33	−6	33	
8	Sioni Bolnisi	26	9	5	12	34	35	−1	32	
9	Borjomi	26	9	4	13	32	39	−7	31	
10	Locomotive Tbilisi	26	7	6	13	27	35	−8	27	
11	Spartaki Tskhinvali (O)	26	5	8	13	15	28	−13	23	Qualification to Relegation play-offs
12	Merani Tbilisi (R)	26	6	1	19	15	54	−39	19	Relegation to Pirveli Liga
13	Dinamo Batumi (R)	26	4	4	18	16	51	−35	16	Relegation to Pirveli Liga
14	Dila Gori (R)	26	1	5	20	12	53	−41	8	Relegation to Pirveli Liga

Source: rsssf.org
Rules for classification: 1st points; 2nd matches won; 3rd head-to-head
(C) Champions; (O) Play-off winners; (R) Relegated

== Results ==
Home \ Away	AME	BOR	DIL	DBA	DIN	LOC	MER	MES	MGL	OLI	SIO	SPA	WIT	ZES
Ameri Tbilisi		3–2	3–2	4–1	0–2	1–1	7–0	0–0	5–0	2–1	2–0	2–0	0–3	1–2
Borjomi	3–0		3–2	1–2	1–2	2–1	1–0	2–0	4–3	0–0	2–5	2–1	1–2	0–2
Dila Gori	0–2	0–0		1–0	0–2	1–1	2–3	0–1	1–3	1–1	0–1	0–0	0–1	1–2
Dinamo Batumi	0–3	1–1	0–0		1–4	1–0	0–2	1–2	2–0	0–1	1–1	0–1	0–3	0–0
Dinamo Tbilisi	2–1	4–2	5–0	7–0		6–5	3–0	5–1	1–0	1–2	3–0	2–1	0–1	2–0
Locomotive Tbilisi	2–1	1–0	1–0	4–1	1–2		0–2	2–3	0–1	0–1	1–0	2–2	0–1	1–1
Merani Tbilisi	1–5	1–0	1–0	2–1	0–2	0–1		0–4	0–1	0–1	1–1	0–1	0–3	0–1
Meskheti Akhaltsikhe	1–2	2–0	2–0	3–2	0–2	0–0	2–1		1–0	0–0	2–2	0–0	2–0	0–2
Mglebi Zugdidi	0–1	4–2	5–0	1–0	1–2	0–0	1–0	1–0		0–2	1–0	2–0	0–3	0–0
Olimpi Rustavi	1–0	1–0	1–0	1–0	0–2	1–0	2–0	0–0	2–1		1–0	1–0	0–1	0–3
Sioni Bolnisi	0–0	0–1	5–1	1–0	1–2	0–3	5–0	1–0	3–1	1–2		1–1	3–1	0–2
Spartaki Tskhinvali	0–1	0–0	3–0	0–1	0–3	2–0	1–0	0–2	0–0	0–2	0–2		0–0	2–2
WIT Georgia	0–1	1–2	2–0	4–1	0–0	1–0	3–0	3–0	2–1	2–1	4–0	1–0		2–1
Zestaponi	3–1	1–0	5–0	4–0	0–1	5–0	6–1	4–1	2–0	2–1	3–1	2–0	1–1	

Source: rsssf.org
Legend: Blue = home team win; Yellow = draw; Red = away team win.

== Relegation play-offs ==
24 May 2008

Spartaki Tskhinvali	1 – 0	Gagra

== See also ==
- 2007–08 Pirveli Liga
- 2007–08 Georgian Cup
