= FC Fazisi Racha =

Georgian association football club

- Full name: საფეხბურთო კლუბი "რაჭა" ამბროლაური
- Nickname: Racha
- Founded: 2007

FC Fazisi Racha (Russian: Фазиси Рача), also spelt FC Phazisi, was a former Georgian association football club.

Racha was promoted from Regionuli Liga in 2006. The club left Pirveli Liga in mid of 2007–08 season. The club in 2007–08 changed its name to FC Fazisi Racha.

== Seasons ==
Season	League	Pos.	Pl.	W	D	L	GF	GA	P	Cup	Europe	Notes	Manager
2006–07	Pirveli Liga	13	34	9	12	13	41	49	39	?			
2007–08	Pirveli Liga West	10	27	2	2	23	17	73	8	?		Relegated	
2008–09										?			
2009–10										?			
2010–11	Meore Liga West A									?			
2011–12	Meore Liga West A									?			
