= FC Meskheti Akhaltsikhe =

- Full name: FC Meskheti Akhaltsikhe
- Founded: 2005
- Dissolved: 2021
- Ground: Mikheil Iadze Stadium
- Capacity: 3,000
- League: N/A
Home colours

FC Meskheti (Georgian: საფეხბურთო კლუბი მესხეთი) is a defunct Georgian football club based in Akhaltsikhe.

Most recently the club took part in Regionuli Liga, the fifth tier of Georgian league system, although in the late 2000s they spent two seasons in the top division.

Meskheti ceased their activities in early 2021.

== History ==
Founded in 2005, the club initially participated in Pirveli Liga for the first two years. Meskheti finished 2nd in 2007 and gained promotion to Umaglesi Liga, where they spent two seasons.

In 2008 certain financial problems hit the club, which was denied assistance from the local municipality.

The next July, unable to meet the requirements necessary for a top-league team, Meskheti were expelled to the second division with 3 points deducted. With the crisis unsolved, the club finished at the bottom of the table and in the 2010–11 season they failed to take part in any league.

Meskheti rejoined Pirveli Liga in 2011. A year later the club once again suspended its participation in official tournaments.

Season	Division	Pos	MP	W	D	L	GF–GA	P	Notes
2005/06	Second	6th of 18	34	17	6	11	50-30	57	
2006/07	Second	2nd of 18	34	22	6	6	69-19	72	Promoted
2007/08	First	6th of 14	26	11	6	9	29-30	39	
2008/09	First	8th of 11	30	7	8	15	23-42	29	Expelled
2009/10	Second	15th of 15	28	7	4	17	26-48	22	-3 points
2011/12	Second, Group A	8th of 10	18	5	2	11	19-25	17	
2011/12	2nd Round	6th of 8	20	6	7	7	11-18	25	

Later, in 2016, Meskheti participated in Group Centre of Meore Liga and then became a member of Regionuli Liga. After the 2020 season they withdrew.

Season	Division	Pos	MP	W	D	L	GF–GA	P
2018	Reg.Liga East A	10th of 11	20	3	1	16	20-106	10
2019	Reg.Liga East A	6th of 9	8	2	2	4	9-20	8
2020	Reg.Liga East A	13th of 14	13	2	1	10	24-62	7

== Current squad ==
Note: Flags indicate national team as defined under FIFA eligibility rules; some limited exceptions apply. Players may hold more than one non-FIFA nationality.

No.	Pos.	Nation	Player
—	GK	GEO	Gela Dzadzunashvili
—	GK	GEO	Giorgi Somkhishvili
—	GK	GEO	Nika Tsikhelashvili
—	DF	GEO	Zurab Bardzimadze
—	DF	GEO	Zurab Dzamsashvili
—	DF	GEO	Zaza Kobesashvili
—	DF	GEO	Dmitri Lekishvili
—	DF	GEO	Aleksandr Metreveli
—	DF	GEO	Giorgi Nadirashvili
—	DF	GEO	Giga Zhvania
—	MF	GEO	Temur Apriamashvili

No.	Pos.	Nation	Player
—	MF	GEO	Zviad Chkhetiani
—	MF	GEO	Paata Gvirchishvili
—	MF	GEO	Giorgi Kevlishvili
—	MF	GEO	Giorgi Turmanidze
—	FW	GEO	Mikheil Takadze
—	FW	GEO	David Inasaridze
—	FW	GEO	Aleksandr Kaidarashvili
—	FW	GEO	Mamuka Rusia
—	FW	GEO	Gela Sudadze
—	FW	GEO	Zurab Sudadze

== Honours ==
- Pirveli Liga
  - Silver Medal winner: 2007
  - Bronze Medal winner: 1995

== City Derby ==
FC Samtskhe was established in the city in 2019. Meskheti lost 1–0 the only match held on 23 September 2020 between the rivals.

== Name ==
Meskheti, being a synonym of Samtskhe, is a part of the Samtskhe-Javakheti region.
