= FC Hereti Lagodekhi =

Hereti Lagodekhi
- Full name: FC Hereti Lagodekhi
- Founded: 2010
- Ground: Lagodekhi Central Stadium
- Capacity: 500
- Manager: Vakhtang Tandashvili
- League: Currently suspended
Home colours

FC Hereti Lagodekhi is a defunct Georgian football club based in Lagodekhi. They played in the Regional League, the fifth division in Georgian football. Their former competition was during 2010.
