= FC Meshakre Agara =

Meshakre Agara
- Full name: Football Club Meshakre Agara
- Founded: [unknown]
- Dissolved: 2008
- Ground: Agara Stadium
- League: N/A

FC Meshakre Agara (Georgian: მეშაქრიე აგარა) is a Georgian association football club based in Agara. In Soviet times the club was named Mekanikosi Agara.

== History ==
In January 2005 the club merged with Akhalgazrda Sportsmenta Akademia Tbilisi and played as ASA-Meshakre Agara. The club competed in the Pirveli Liga, the second tier of Georgian football, and left the league at the end of the 2007–08 season.

[Founding date, stadium, managers: to be added with sources]

== Seasons ==
Season	League	Pos.	Pl.	W	D	L	GF	GA	Pts	Cup
2005–06	Pirveli Liga	5	34	18	5	11	46	32	59	1st round
2006–07	Pirveli Liga	7	34	15	10	9	45	36	55	2nd round
2007–08	Pirveli Liga (West)	4	27	13	9	5	34	22	48	1st round

== Notable players ==
- (Georgia (country)) Gia Chkhaidze (2006–2007)

FC Meshakre Agara is a Georgian association football club.

Racha was promoted from Regionuli Liga in 2005. The club left Pirveli Liga in the end of 2007–08 season.

The club was merged with Akhalgazrda Sportsmenta Akademia Tbilisi in January 2005 as ASA-Meshakre Agara.

In Soviet times the club named as Mekanikosi Agara.
