= FC Dinamo Batumi =

Georgian professional football club

Dinamo Batumi
- Full name: Football Club Dinamo Batumi
- Founded: 30 November 1923; 102 years ago
- Stadium: Batumi Arena
- Capacity: 20,000
- Owner: Temur Mikeladze
- President: Archil Beridze
- Head coach: Giorgi Chiabrishvili
- League: Erovnuli Liga
- 2025: Erovnuli Liga, 6th of 10
- Website: dinamobatumi.com
Home colours	Away colours	Third colours

Football Club Dinamo Batumi (Georgian: საფეხბურთო კლუბი დინამო ბათუმი) is a Georgian professional football club based in Batumi, Adjara that competes in the Erovnuli Liga, the top division of Georgian football.

They are one of the oldest clubs in the country, having won all three major trophies: two league titles, one Georgian Cup and two Super Cups. As of 2026, it ranks third in the all-time national points rankings. In 1990, they changed their name to FC Batumi, only to reverse the decision in 1994.

Dinamo play their home matches at the Batumi Arena.

== History ==
=== Early period ===
Prior to the formation of this club, there were some other teams existing in the city. In 1923, two newly established clubs called Mezgvauri (The Sailor) and Tsiteli Raindi (The Red Knight) merged and became Dinamo Batumi.

Football became more popular in Adjara later, although Dinamo participated only in the lower divisions of Soviet championship. However, there were some players in the club, who later became successful footballers in the USSR, including Revaz Chelebadze, Nodar Khizanishvili and Vakhtang Koridze. The famous Greek footballer Andreas Niniadis also started his career in the club. He later played for Olympiacos and the Greece national team.

The team played the last six seasons of the 1980s in the Soviet First League, tier 2 of Soviet football.

=== 1990s and 2000s ===
The success for the Batumi-based club came when they won the Georgian Cup in 1998, after losing two previous finals. As the team defeated Dinamo Tbilisi, the goals were scored by Aleksandre Kantidze and Davit Chichveishvili. They secured the Georgian Super Cup as well after a 2–1 win over the same opponents. As one of the strongest teams of the league, starting from 1995 Dinamo represented the country in European competitions for four consecutive seasons.

The next decade turned out disappointing for Dinamo, which failed to notch up any success on either competition. Amid construction boom in Adjara, in 2006 the club lost their stadium, located at the seaside, to be sold and demolished. The Adeli stadium, which Dinamo started using as their home ground, met the same fate later on. It coincided with deteriorating performance in the league. After 2007–08 they were relegated to Pirveli Liga for the first time. Overall, Dinamo spent next five seasons out of six in the second division.

=== In search for success ===
In 2013–14, the club revived their ambitions, first to gain promotion to Umaglesi Liga and then to secure a place among the league leaders. They performed as runners-up after a 17-year wait in 2015, but two years later entered the period of instability characterized by a drastic change of players and replacement of managers. The team concluded the season in the relegation zone, despite having some experienced players such as Otar Martsvaladze, David Kvirkvelia and Elguja Grigalashvili in the squad. They suffered a worse setback in the play-off as a dramatic two-leg tie against Sioni resulted in their relegation.

Prior to the new season in Liga 2, Gia Geguchadze was appointed as head coach and with promotion set as their only goal, Dinamo convincingly won the league by an eleven-point margin.

=== Тhe Lamini managerial years (2020–25) ===
In early 2020, 100% share of Dinamo Batumi owned by the Adjarian government was awarded to Lamini Ltd for 49 years.

Back in the top flight Dinamo rushed to the title-chasing battle, in which they initially performed beyond expectations. As no other newly promoted club had ever won the league, Dinamo Batumi appeared close to setting this record, although at the crucial stage they slipped up, dropping vital points against two unmotivated clubs. Yet, the second place was definitely success for the club, where national team members Jaba Jigauri, Giorgi Navalovski and Vladimer Dvalishvili emerged at this stage.

On 27 October 2020, following a long-awaited opening ceremony of the Batumi Stadium, the second-placed club for two consecutive seasons representing the second largest city proudly moved into their new home.

Dinamo Batumi achieved their biggest league triumph from a third straight attempt in 2021. With the same head coach into the fourth season and a largely retained squad, the team gained advantage over their rivals, won six matches with a large margin, including 8–1, the biggest win of the season, and lifted the Champion's Shield for the first time in their history. Subsequently, their seven players were named in Team of the Season. An impressive UEFA European campaign also boosted the players from Adjara. Seven of them were called up in early September for Georgia's World Cup qualifier against Spain.

Dinamo Batumi position attracted young talents like Khvicha Kvaratskhelia and Zuriko Davitashvili to join the club in March 2022. The next year, amid the celebrations of their centenary season, the team, now guided by Andriy Demchenko, secured the league title, also reaching the cup final for the first time in 25 years.

A new decline started in 2024 when Dinamo failed to finish the season among top two teams for the first time in the last six years. In the summer of 2025, the management admitted a financial crisis. As a year-long transfer ban was imposed by FIFA, many footballers left the club. In early December, the Adjarian government announced that they abolished the 2020 agreement with Lamini Ltd and restored full control over the club. On 29 December 2025, JSC DB 1923 officially took over Dinamo Batumi.

== Statistics ==
=== Domestic ===
Champions	Runners-up	Third place	Relegated	Promoted

Season	League	Pos.	P	W	D	L	GF	GA	P	Georgian Cup	Super Cup	Europe
1990	Umaglesi Liga	6	34	18	7	9	56	28	61	Semi-finals		N/A
1991	Umaglesi Liga	5	19	10	2	7	28	21	32	Semi-finals		N/A
1991–92	Umaglesi Liga	9	38	15	6	17	55	58	51	Quarter-finals		N/A
1992–93	Umaglesi Liga	11	32	11	6	15	56	56	39	Runner-up		N/A
1993–94	Umaglesi Liga	5	32	16	5	11	63	46	53	Semi-finals		
1994–95	Umaglesi Liga	4	30	16	6	8	69	40	54	Runner-up		
1995–96	Umaglesi Liga	6	30	16	6	8	68	28	54	Runner-up	Runner-up	CWC 1st Round
1996–97	Umaglesi Liga	3	30	18	8	4	71	22	62	Runner-up	Runner-up	CWC 1st Round
1997–98	Umaglesi Liga	2	30	18	7	5	58	19	62	Winner	Winner	CWC QR
1998–99	Umaglesi Liga	5	30	13	11	6	49	22	50	Quarter-finals		CWC QR
1999–00	Umaglesi Liga	4								Semi-finals		
2000–01	Umaglesi Liga	7								Round of 16		
2001–02	Umaglesi Liga	5								Quarter-finals		
2002–03	Umaglesi Liga	8								Round of 16		
2003–04	Umaglesi Liga	10								Quarter-finals		
2004–05	Umaglesi Liga	8	36	9	12	15	35	33	39	Quarter-finals		
2005–06	Umaglesi Liga	6	30	17	7	6	42	21	58	Round of 16		
2006–07	Umaglesi Liga	9	26	8	6	12	27	30	30	Semi-finals		
2007–08	Umaglesi Liga	13	26	4	4	18	16	51	16	Round of 16		
2008–09	Pirveli Liga	8	30	9	9	12	33	42	36			
2009–10	Pirveli Liga	5	28	15	8	5	44	17	53	Round of 32		
2010–11	Pirveli Liga	5	32	18	9	5	66	18	63	Round of 16		
2011–12	Pirveli Liga	1	18	13	3	2	28	9	42	Round of 16		
2012–13	Umaglesi Liga	11	32	8	7	17	39	55	31	Round of 16		
2013–14	Pirveli Liga	2	26	19	2	5	65	17	59	Round of 16		
2014–15	Umaglesi Liga	2	30	18	4	8	40	24	58	Round of 16		
2015–16	Umaglesi Liga	8	30	12	8	10	41	32	44	Round of 16		Europa League 1st QR
2016	Umaglesi Liga	3	15	7	5	3	23	7	26	Round of 32		
2017	Erovnuli Liga	8	36	10	3	23	28	60	33	Round of 32		Europa League 1st QR
2018	Liga 2	1	36	23	7	6	60	22	76	Round of 16		
2019	Erovnuli Liga	2	36	21	7	8	57	31	70	Round of 32		
2020	Erovnuli Liga	2	18	10	6	2	29	14	36	Round of 16		Europa League 1st QR
2021	Erovnuli Liga	1	36	21	12	3	73	27	75	Semi-finals		UECL 3rd QR
2022	Erovnuli Liga	2	36	23	8	5	87	34	77	Round of 16	Winner	UCL 1st QR; UECL 2nd QR
2023	Erovnuli Liga	1	36	21	11	4	83	41	74	Runner-up	Runner-up	UECL 1st QR
2024	Erovnuli Liga	4	36	15	10	11	42	41	55	Quarter-finals		UCL 1st QR; UECL 2nd QR
2025	Erovnuli Liga	6	36	11	10	15	40	59	43	Semi-finals		

=== Top scorers ===
Season	Div.	Player	Goals
2011/12	2nd	(Georgia (country)) Mikheil Jorbenadze	8
2012/13	1st	(Georgia (country)) Mikheil Jorbenadze	6
2013/14	2nd	(Georgia (country)) Amiran Abuselidze	8
2014/15	1st	(Georgia (country)) Giorgi Beriashvili	9
2015/16	1st	(Georgia (country)) Giorgi Beriashvili	10
2016	1st	(Georgia (country)) Elguja Lobjanidze (Georgia (country)) Temur Shonia	5
2017	1st	(Ukraine) Yaroslav Kvasov	8
2018	2nd	(Brazil) Flamarion	24
2019	1st	(Brazil) Flamarion	17
2020	1st	(Georgia (country)) Jaba Jigauri	8
2021	1st	(Georgia (country)) Jaba Jigauri (Georgia (country)) Giorgi Pantsulaia	13
2022	1st	(Brazil) Flamarion	19
2023	1st	(Brazil) Flamarion	17
2024	1st	(Georgia (country)) Lado Mamuchashvili (Angola) Mario Balburdia	5
2025	1st	(Spain) Jalen Blesa	7

=== European campaigns ===
Dinamo players against Celtic, 1995

Dinamo's European history began with the 1995 Cup Winners' Cup competition. In a memorable home game against Celtic, more than 15,000 spectators witnessed good attacking football from both sides. The Georgians took the early lead but conceded twice in the first period. They equalized later and came close to the draw, although the Scots scored at the end of the regular time to cruise to victory.

A year later the draw paired Dinamo against PSV Eindhoven. Even though the Dutch side were the ultimate winners, Batumi played decently enough to earn a point in the first game. Goals in this game were scored by Amiran Mujiri and Luc Nilis.

Another remarkable event occurred in 1998 when they beat the powerful Yugoslav team Partizan Belgrade at home.

In 2021, the club narrowly missed out on UEFA Conference League play-offs after an extra-time draw at Sivasspor preceded by a sensational away victory over BATE Borisov.

As of match played 10 July 2024

Competition	Pld	W	D	L	GF	GA
UEFA Champions League	3	0	1	2	2	5
UEFA Cup Winners' Cup	12	5	2	5	18	18
UEFA Europa League	5	1	0	4	1	10
UEFA Europa Conference League	10	3	3	4	17	14
Total	30	9	6	15	38	47

Season	Competition	Round	Club	Home	Away	Aggregate
1995–96	UEFA Cup Winners' Cup	QR	(Federal Republic of Yugoslavia) Obilić	2–2	1–0	3–2
1995–96	UEFA Cup Winners' Cup	1R	(Scotland) Celtic	2–3	0–4	2–7
1996–97	UEFA Cup Winners' Cup	QR	(Faroe Islands) HB Torshavn	6–0	3–0	9–0
1996–97	UEFA Cup Winners' Cup	1R	(Netherlands) PSV Eindhoven	1–1	0–3	1–4
1997–98	UEFA Cup Winners' Cup	QR	(Armenia) Ararat Yerevan	0–3	2–0	2–3
1998–99	UEFA Cup Winners' Cup	QR	(Federal Republic of Yugoslavia) Partizan	1–0	0–2	1–2
2015–16	UEFA Europa League	1QR	(Cyprus) AC Omonia	1–0	0–2	1–2
2017–18	UEFA Europa League	1QR	(Poland) Jagiellonia Białystok	0–1	0–4	0–5
2020–21	UEFA Europa League	1QR	(Israel) Hapoel Be'er Sheva	—N/a	0–3	—N/a
2021–22	UEFA Europa Conference League	1QR	(San Marino) Tre Penne	3–0	4–0	7–0
2021–22	UEFA Europa Conference League	2QR	(Belarus) BATE Borisov	0–1	4–1	4–2
2021–22	UEFA Europa Conference League	3QR	(Turkey) Sivasspor	1–2	1–1 (a.e.t.)	2–3
2022–23	UEFA Champions League	1QR	(Slovakia) Slovan Bratislava	1–2 (a.e.t.)	0–0	1–2
2022–23	UEFA Europa Conference League	2QR	(Poland) Lech Poznań	1–1	0–5	1–6
2023–24	UEFA Europa Conference League	1QR	(Albania) Tirana	1–2	1–1	2–3
2024–25	UEFA Champions League	1QR	(Bulgaria) Ludogorets Razgrad	1–0	1–3	2–3
2024–25	UEFA Conference League	2QR	(Montenegro) Dečić	0–2	0–0	0–2

== Crest and colours ==
=== Kit manufacturers and shirt sponsors ===
Period	Kit manufacturer	Shirt sponsor	Ref
2020-21	Puma	Europebet	
2022	Errea	7th Heaven Residence	
2023	Errea	Crocobet Lixin group	

== Current squad ==
As of 21 September 2026

Note: Flags indicate national team as defined under FIFA eligibility rules; some limited exceptions apply. Players may hold more than one non-FIFA nationality.

No.	Pos.	Nation	Player
1	GK	GEO	Lazare Kupatadze
3	DF	GEO	Alika Getiashvili
4	DF	GEO	Luka Kapianidze
5	DF	GAM	Yahya Kalley
6	MF	UKR	Artem Mylchenko
7	FW	MDA	Dmitri Mandrîcenco
8	MF	GEO	Sandro Altunashvili
9	FW	BRA	Maurides
10	MF	ALB	Uerdi Mara
11	FW	BRA	Paulo Vítor
12	DF	GEO	Luka Lakvekheliani
13	GK	GEO	Nodari Kalichava
14	MF	GEO	Giorgi Kokhreidze
15	DF	LUX	Enes Mahmutović
16	MF	ISR	Awaka Eshata

No.	Pos.	Nation	Player
18	MF	NED	Imran Oulad Omar
19	DF	GEO	Nika Kalandarishvili
20	FW	GEO	Luka Tsulukidze
22	FW	GEO	Tornike Kirkitadze
23	DF	GEO	Mamuka Kobakhidze (captain)
24	DF	LUX	Dirk Carlson
25	DF	GEO	Zura Tedoradze
27	FW	GEO	Levan Shengelia
29	DF	BUL	Ivan Turitsov
30	GK	GEO	Mate Turmanidze
31	GK	GEO	Saba Ismailov
35	DF	GEO	Revaz Chiteishvili
36	MF	GEO	Nika Baladze
37	MF	GEO	Giorgi Putkaradze
39	MF	GEO	Guram Japaridze

=== Out on loan ===
Note: Flags indicate national team as defined under FIFA eligibility rules; some limited exceptions apply. Players may hold more than one non-FIFA nationality.

No.	Pos.	Nation	Player
—	MF	GEO	Nika Dumbadze (West Georgia)
—	MF	GEO	Dachi Abuselidze (West Georgia)
—	FW	GEO	Levan Khozrevanidze (STK 1914 Šamorín)

== Managerial history ==
=== Notable managers ===
Below is the list of coaches who spent at least two seasons at Dinamo Batumi

- Shota Cheishvili (1990–94, 1996–99, 2015–16)
- Valerian Chkhartishvili (1994–96)
- Giovanni Carnevali (2000–02)
- Levan Khomeriki (2014–15, 2016–17)
- Gia Geguchadze (2018–2023)

=== Recent managers ===
Name	Nat.	From	To
Gia Guruli	(Georgia (country))	April 2012	June 2013
Koba Zhorzhikashvili	(Georgia (country))	July 2013	March 2014
Levan Khomeriki	(Georgia (country))	March 2014	June 2015
Shota Cheishvili	(Georgia (country))	July 2015	April 2016
Levan Khomeriki	(Georgia (country))	April 2016	May 2017
Kostyantyn Frolov	(Ukraine)	May 2017	October 2017
Aslan Baladze	(Georgia (country))	October 2017	December 2017
Gia Geguchadze	(Georgia (country))	January 2018	August 2023
Andriy Demchenko	(Ukraine)	August 2023	October 2024

== Honours ==
- Erovnuli Liga
  - Winners (2): 2021, 2023
  - Runners-up (5): 1997–98, 2014–15, 2019, 2020, 2022
  - Third place (2): 1996–97, 2016
- Georgian Cup
  - Winners (1): 1997–98
  - Runners-up (5): 1992–93, 1994–95, 1995–96, 1996–97, 2023
- Georgian Super Cup
  - Winners (2): 1997–98, 2022
  - Runners-up (3): 1995–96, 1996–97, 2023
