= FC Zestaponi =

- Full name: Football Club Zestaponi
- Nicknames: Zesta, Feroelebi (Ferroians), Margvelebi (Margvetians)
- Founded: 2004; 22 years ago
- Ground: David Abashidze Stadium; Zestaponi, Georgia
- Capacity: 4,558
- Manager: Giorgi Cheishvili
- League: Regionuli Liga
- 2025: Liga 4, 13th
- Website: http://www.fczestafoni.ge
Home colours	Away colours

Football Club Zestaponi is a Georgian football club based in Zestaponi. They play their home games at David Abashidze Stadium. Zestaponi was founded on 18 June 2004 by the initiative of the shareholders of JSC Giorgi Nikoladze Zestaponi Ferro-Alloy Plant.

At that time Zestaponi have their own club FC Metallurg Zestaponi. A new club was formed as Margveti Zestaponi joined Pirveli Liga and promoted in the first season. Margveti was a member of Umaglesi Liga and achieved their best result in 1995–96 by finishing runner-up.

== History ==
=== FC Metalurgi Zestaponi (1937–1989) ===
From the beginning of the 20th century football was given rise in Georgia. In 1906 the first football fan club was founded in Tbilisi. This happened by the patronage of Mr. Lgotac. He was the one who on 23 February 1907 established the first football club in Georgia. The club, called "Comet", had its own regulations, funds, uniforms and a stadium.

Though it should be mentioned, that football was played far earlier in Georgia, mainly in the sea-side cities, first of all in Poti, where local groups competed in "passing/tossing a ball" with British mariners. That's why Poti is considered to be a cradle of Georgian football.

As to Zestaponi, in out city, football has been played since the beginning of the 20th century. First football players from Zestaponi were students of the local gymnasium (currently secondary school #1). According to our data, Zestaponi football team held its first match with one of the clubs of western Georgia (according to different sources Senaki or Ozurgeti) in 1918, during a celebration organized to commemorate Independence of Georgia. First international match held in Zestaponi was also during the independence period, in 1920. Zestaponi team competed with a group of British Occupational Forces and defeated it by 2–1.

In the 1920s Zestaponi football players held various matches with teams of neighboring cities. In 1927 first Football Championship in held in Georgia. First Champion of Georgia is Team of Batumi.

In the 1930s two football teams are established in Zestaponi – "Mertskhali" (Swallow) and "Locomotive", that often take part in local and regional tournaments.

A truly new era in the history of Zestaponi football starts form the second half of the 1930s, after a metallurgical giant, "Zestaponi Ferro-Alloy Plant", has been put into exploitation. It was by the initiative of professional committee of the plant, that a meeting of workers of the physical culture was held on 10 May 1937. A decision of establishing a football team was made on the meeting. The team was called "Metallurgi".

In August 1938, "Metallurgi" participates in the union tournament held by sport-society "Metallurgist" in Minsk, where the team defeats "Electrostal Moscow", "Krasni Oktiabr Staliningrad", "Metallurg Leningrad" and loses in final to "Serp i Molot". In 1938 FC Metallurgi Zestaponi is engaged in Georgian Championship, where it participates regularly until 1989.

In various years of Soviet era "Metallurgi" was:

Silver medalist of Georgian Championship – 1967, 1970, 1982;

Runners-Up of Georgian Cup – 1966, 1967, 1971 years;

Georgian Cup's Winner – 1962.

Various football players from "Metallurgi" played for leading Georgian football clubs on various degrees, for example: Lokomotivi Tbilisi – Guram Shavdia, Zaur Chubinidze; Torpedo Kutaisi – Guram Nishnianidze; Dinamo Tbilisi – Giorgi (Jora) Chumburidze, Guram Kochiashvili, Dodik Khundadze, Guram Petriashvili, Kartlos Tsintsadze, Nodar Kiknadze.

=== Margveti Zestaponi (1990–2000) ===
In 1990 Georgian Football Federation leaves the Soviet Union's Football Federation. An Independent Georgian Football Federation is formed, that shortly after becomes a member of FIFA and UEFA, leading Georgian Clubs are engaged in National Championships.

In 1990 a new Football Club is founded in Zestaponi – FC Margveti Zestaponi, that holds the position of "Metallurgi" in Pirveli League of the Georgian National Championship and from the very first year becomes a member of Umaglesi league.

In 1993 and 1996 years "Margveti" is the semi-finalist of the Georgian National Cup. In 1996 "Margveti" is the Vice-Champion of Georgia and participates in UEFA Cup Qualification Round. Unfortunately, due to financial problems, at the end of the 20th century the club broke up.

In total, in the years of 1991–1998 FC "Margveti" participated in Umaglesi League 8 National Championships, held 247 matches, won 98 of them, draw 43, lost – 106, difference in scores 397–443.

In 2006 "Margveti-2006" was founded in the lower division and recently in Meore Liga, but it is different (municipal) club.

Season	League	Pos.	Pl.	W	D	L	GF	GA	P	Cup	Europe	Notes
1990	Pirveli Liga	2	38	28	3	7	102	44	87	Round of 32	N/A	Promoted
1991	Umaglesi Liga	8	19	8	3	8	32	32	27	Round of 32	N/A	
1991–92	Umaglesi Liga	8	38	14	11	13	60	58	53	Round of 16	N/A	
1992–93	Umaglesi Liga	6	32	15	5	12	49	54	50	Semi-finals		
1993–94	Umaglesi Liga	8	38	15	7	16	71	68	20/18	–		
1994–95	Umaglesi Liga	9	30	10	6	14	35	53	36	Round of 32		
1995–96	Umaglesi Liga	2	30	22	2	6	85	37	68	Semi-finals		
1996–97	Umaglesi Liga	7	30	12	2	16	44	66	38	Quarter-finals	UEFA Cup Preliminary round	
1997–98	Umaglesi Liga	16	30	2	7	21	21	75	13	Round of 32		Relegated
1998–99	Pirveli liga	2	24	18	4	2	78	24	58	Round of 32		
1999–00	Pirveli liga West Group A	1	22	18	4	0	71	18	58	Round of 16		

=== Metalurgi Zestaponi (1999–2004) ===
As FC Margveti Zestaponi faced financial problem and relegated in 1998. A new club using the city legend team name Metallurgi Zestaponi was formed in 1999. The club promoted to Umaglesi Liga in 2001. But the club faced financial problem and relegated in 2003. In 2003–04, the club finished bottom in Pirveli Liga and disestablished .

Season	League	Pos.	Pl.	W	D	L	GF	GA	P	Cup	Europe	Notes
1999–00	Pirveli liga West Group A	4	22	12	5	5	42	27	41	Round of 32		
2000–01	Pirveli liga	2	32	17	8	7	48	31	42/38	Round of 16		Promoted
2001–02	Umaglesi Liga	9	32	9	10	13	33	44	37	Round of 16		
2002–03	Umaglesi Liga	12	32	6	1	25	17	79	19	Round of 32		Relegated
2003–04	Pirveli liga	16	30	2	1	27	18	87	7	Round of 32		Initially relegated, but after the merger with FC Zestaponi were promoted to the Umaglesi Liga

=== FC Zestaponi (2004–present) ===
On 18 June 2004, FC Zestaponi was incorporated. The club was invited to join Umaglesi Liga. Although, FC Metallurgi, FC Margveti and FC Zestaponi came from the same city, played on same stadium. They never met in the Umaglesi league and all clubs came from the succession of Metallurg Zestaponi.

Season	League	Pos.	Pl.	W	D	L	GF	GA	P	Cup	Europe	Notes
2004–05	Umaglesi Liga	5	36	16	5	15	38	48	53	Runner-up	–	
2005–06	Umaglesi Liga	4	30	18	7	5	44	22	61	Runner-up	–	
2006–07	Umaglesi Liga	4	26	16	9	1	55	11	57	Runner-up	–	
2007–08	Umaglesi Liga	3	26	18	5	3	56	16	59	Winner	Intertoto 1st Round	
2008–09	Umaglesi Liga	4	30	16	4	10	43	27	52	Quarter-finals	UEFA Cup 1st qualifying round	
2009–10	Umaglesi Liga	3	36	19	10	7	58	33	67	Quarter-finals	UEFA Europa League 2nd qualifying round	
2010–11	Umaglesi Liga	1	36	24	6	6	72	19	78	Semi-finals	UEFA Europa League 3rd qualifying round	
2011–12	Umaglesi Liga	1	36	24	7	5	73	33	79	Runner-up	2011–12 UEFA Champions League 3rd qualifying round UEFA Europa League Play-offs	
2012–13	Umaglesi Liga	5	32	12	6	14	35	38	42	Round of 16	2012–13 UEFA Champions League 2nd qualifying round	
2013–14	Umaglesi Liga	2	32	19	5	8	48	23	62	Round of 16	–	
2014–15	Umaglesi Liga	16	30	6	8	16	40	61	26	Round of 16	UEFA Europa League 2nd qualifying round	Expelled
2018	Regionuli Liga	4	28	17	2	9	60	33	23/30	Second round		
2019	Regionuli Liga	2	27	20	5	2	100	29	23/42	Round of 32		Promotion to Liga 4
2020	Liga 4	6	14	4	4	6	22	20	16	Second round		
2021	Liga 4	2	36	23	9	4	76	27	41/37	Round of 32		Promotion to Liga 3
2022	Liga 3	15	30	4	3	23	18	77	15	Second round		
2023	Liga 3	13	30	6	11	13	33	46	29	First round		
2024	Liga 3	14	30	6	11	13	32	49	26	Second round		Relegated to Liga 4
2025	Liga 4	13	30	7	8	15	47	57	29	First round		Relegated to Regionuli Liga
2026	Regionuli Liga									Preliminary round		

== Stadium ==
David Abashidze stadium was built by "Zestaponi Ferro-alloy Plant", started operating in 1952. Though a couple of matches were held on the stadium before its opening in 1951.

In 1952–1989 and 1999–2003 participant of Georgian Championship, FC Metallurgi held matches on the Zestaponi central stadium, in 1990–1998 it was a home stadium for FC Margveti.

Since 2004 FC Zestaponi is holding domestic matches on the stadium.

In 1981 reconstruction works were done on arena, west stand was roofed, east stand was constructed, after these works capacity of the Stadium increased to 8,000 seats.

In 2004, after establishing FC Zestaponi, central Stadium was repaired and is still being repaired to renew the arena and comply with international standards.

In 2005 works were done to renew the grass surface on the Stadium. Georgian workers have constructed new drainage system of German technology. Field is watered by a watering system of an American Company "Rainbird" (by the way this watering system was successfully used on 8 Stadiums during 2004 European Championship in Portugal).

On the David Abashidze Stadium (former Central) Stadium field surface "Natural Green Carpet" is made by the Ukrainian firm "Lidia-Park".

FC Zestaponi management is building a new base for the club. Many new football fields have been constructed in Zestaponi (among them one with an artificial surface). Relevant infrastructure is being made – work out rooms are being repaired, building of a new tribunes with personal seats is planned, along with the installment of a modern score-board.

Today capacity of the Stadium increased to 4,558 individual seats.

On 9 April 2010 the stadium was named after David Abashidze who contributed tremendously to the development and revival of football in Zestaponi.

== Honors ==
- Erovnuli Liga
  - Champions: 2010–11, 2011–12
- Georgian Cup
  - Champions: 2007–08
- Georgian Super Cup
  - Champions: 2011, 2012

== Zestaponian Clubs in Georgian Umaglesi Liga ==
As of 12 April 2015

Club	Seasons	Years	Matches	Wins	Draws	Loses	GF	GA	Points
FC Margveti Zestaponi	8	1991–1998	247	98	43	106	397	443	337
FC Metallurgi	2	2001–2003	64	15	11	38	50	123	56
FC Zestaponi	11	2004–2015	343	188	72	83	562	310	636
Total	21	1991–2015	654	301	126	227	1009	876	1029

== FC Zestaponi. All competitions statistic ==
As of 12 April 2015

Competition	Wins	Draws	Loses	GF	GA	Points
Georgian Umaglesi Liga	188	72	83	562	310	636
Georgian Cup	40	15	14	123	51	
Georgian Super Cup	1	1	1	3	2	
UEFA Champions League	1	2	3	6	9	
UEFA Cup/UEFA Europa League	4	5	7	27	19	
UEFA Intertoto Cup	1	0	1	2	3	

== European Cups ==
Season	Competition	Round	Club	Home	Away
2007	UEFA Intertoto Cup	1Q	(Kazakhstan) Tobol	2–0	0–3
2008–09	UEFA Cup	1Q	(Hungary) Gyori ETO	1–2	1–1
2009–10	UEFA Europa League	1Q	(Northern Ireland) Lisburn Distillery	6–0	5–1
2009–10	UEFA Europa League	2Q	(Sweden) Helsingborg	1–2	2–2
2010–11	UEFA Europa League	1Q	(San Marino) Faetano	5–0	0–0
2010–11	UEFA Europa League	2Q	(Slovakia) Dukla Banska Bystrica	3–0	0–1
2010–11	UEFA Europa League	3Q	(Ukraine) Karpaty Lviv	0–1	0–1
2011–12	UEFA Champions League	2Q	(Moldova) Dacia Chisinau	3–0	0–2
2011–12	UEFA Champions League	3Q	(Austria) Sturm Graz	1–1	0–1
2011–12	UEFA Europa League	PO	(Belgium) Brugge	3–3	0–2
2012–13	UEFA Champions League	2Q	(Azerbaijan) Neftchi Baku	2–2	0–3
2014–15	UEFA Europa League	2Q	(Slovakia) Spartak Trnava	0–0	0–3

== Goals in Georgian Umaglesi Liga ==
Topscorers

Name	Position	Country	Years	Goals
Nikoloz Gelashvili	Forward	(Georgia (country))	2008–2016	63
Jaba Dvali	Forward	(Georgia (country))	2010–2012, 2014	55
Zurab Ionanidze	Forward	(Georgia (country))	2005–2009	48
Rati Tsinamdzgvrishvili	Forward	(Georgia (country))	2008–2013	24
Tornike Gorgiashvili	Midfielder	(Georgia (country))	2005–2013	21
Gogi Pipia	Midfielder	(Georgia (country))	2005–2011	21
Shota Grigalashvili	Midfielder	(Georgia (country))	2009–2012	18

Topscorers by season

Season	Name	Goals
2004/05	(Georgia (country)) Zaza Zirakishvili	10
2005/06	(Georgia (country)) Zurab Ionanidze	17
2006/07	(Georgia (country)) Gogi Pipia	13
2007/08	(Brazil) Gilvan Gomes	12
2008/09	(Georgia (country)) Nikoloz Gelashvili	20
2009/10	(Georgia (country)) Nikoloz Gelashvili	16
2010/11	(Georgia (country)) Nikoloz Gelashvili	18
2011/12	(Georgia (country)) Jaba Dvali	20
2012/13	(Georgia (country)) Tornike Gorgiashvili	7
2013/14	(Georgia (country)) Nikoloz Sabanadze	8
2014/15	(Georgia (country)) Jaba Dvali	10

Goal N.	Name	Country	Date
1	Giorgi Kurtsikidze	(Georgia (country))	2 August 2004
100	Zurab Ionanidze	(Georgia (country))	18 November 2006
200	Nikoloz Gelashvili	(Georgia (country))	2 November 2008
300	Nikoloz Gelashvili	(Georgia (country))	29 August 2010
400	Zaal Eliava	(Georgia (country))	14 December 2011
500	Giorgi Kukhianidze	(Georgia (country))	2 March 2014

== Matches in Georgian Umaglesi Liga ==
As of 6 March 2015

Name	Position	Country	Years	Matches
Roin Kvaskhvadze	Goalkeeper	(Georgia (country))	2005–13	155
Aleks Benashvili	Midfielder	(Georgia (country))	2005–13	136
Giorgi Khidesheli	Defender	(Georgia (country))	2005–13, 2014	126
Sevasti Todua	Defender	(Georgia (country))	2005–10	116
Tornike Aptsiauri	Midfielder	(Georgia (country))	2010–13	114
Zurab Ionanidze	Forward	(Georgia (country))	2005–10	113
Tornike Gorgiashvili	Midfielder	(Georgia (country))	2005–13	112
Jaba Dvali	Forward	(Georgia (country))	2009–12, 2014	110
Zaal Eliava	Defender	(Georgia (country))	2009–12	108
Irakli Dzaria	Midfielder	(Georgia (country))	2005–11	108
Nikoloz Gelashvili	Forward	(Georgia (country))	2007–11	107
Shota Grigalashvili	Midfielder	(Georgia (country))	2009–12	101
Murtaz Daushvili	Midfielder	(Georgia (country))	2005–11	99

== Managers ==
- (Moldova) Vladimir Zemlianoi (18 June 2004 – 18 September 2004)
- (Georgia (country)) Zaza Gurielidze (20 September 2004 – 2 October 2004)
- (Georgia (country)) Teimuraz Makharadze (5 Oct 2004 – 14 October 2005)
- (Georgia (country)) Koba Zhorzhikashvili (15 Oct 2005 – 12 November 2005)
- (Georgia (country)) Teimuraz Makharadze (13 Nov 2005 – 30 March 2006)
- (Georgia (country)) Koba Zhorzhikashvili (31 March 2006 – 30 May 2006)
- (Georgia (country)) Merab Kochlashvili (1 June 2006 – 30 August 2006)
- (Georgia (country)) Teimuraz Makharadze (1 September 2006 – 30 November 2008)
- (Georgia (country)) Gia Geguchadze (1 Dec 2008 – 16 August 2011)
- (Georgia (country)) Giorgi Chiabrishvili (18 Aug 2011 – 12 September 2012)
- (Georgia (country)) Davit Mujiri and Zaza Zamtaradze (14 September 2012 – 10 December 2012)
- (Georgia (country)) Kakhaber Kacharava (13 Dec 2012 – 31 May 2013)
- (Serbia) Ratko Dostanić (15 July 2013 – 1 November 2013)
- (Georgia (country)) Gia Geguchadze (5 Nov 2013 – 31 December 2014)
- (Georgia (country)) Giorgi Mikadze (2015)
- (Georgia (country)) Guram Mazmishvili (2018)
- (Georgia (country)) Malkhaz Gongadze (2018–2020)
- (Georgia (country)) Levan Jokhadze (2020)
