= FC Ameri Tbilisi =

Ameri
- Full name: Football Club; Ameri Tbilisi
- Founded: 2002
- Dissolved: 2009
- Ground: Ameri Stadium, Tbilisi, Georgia
- Capacity: 1,000
Home colours	Away colours

FC Ameri Tbilisi was a Georgian football club based in the district of Gldani in Tbilisi. The club was founded in 2002 and was dissolved in 2009 after financial troubles.

Ameri won promotion for the Second Division after the 2002–03 season. In 2003/04 they finished 12th out of 16 and were to be relegated, but were saved after withdrawal of two teams. In 2004/05 they became the champions of the Second Division, winning promotion to Umaglesi Liga. In 2005/06 they finished seventh in the league, but won the Georgian Cup. This allowed them to enter the UEFA Cup.

== European record ==
As of match played 2 August 2007

Competition	Pld	W	D	L	GF	GA
UEFA Cup	6	2	1	3	6	7
Total	6	2	1	3	6	7

Season	Competition	Round	Club	Home	Away	Aggregate
2006–07	UEFA Cup	1Q	(Armenia) Banants	0–1	2–1	2–2(a)
2006–07	UEFA Cup	2Q	(Germany) Hertha BSC	2–2	0–1	2–3
2007–08	UEFA Cup	1Q	(Poland) GKS Bełchatów	2–0	0–2	2–2(2–4p)

== Achievements ==
- Georgian Cup
  - Winners: 2005–06, 2006–07
- Georgian Super Cup
  - Winners: 2006, 2007
