= 2025 Georgian Super Cup =

Football tournament in Georgia

Tournament details
- Host country: Georgia
- Dates: 26 June - 2 July 2025
- Teams: 4

Final positions
- Champions: Dila Gori (1st title)
- Runners-up: FC Spaeri

Tournament statistics
- Matches played: 4
- Goals scored: 6 (1.5 per match)

The 2025 Georgian Super Cup was the 24th edition of the Georgian Super Cup, an annual football competition for clubs in the Georgian football league system that were successful in its major competitions in the preceding season. It was the third edition of the tournament under the new format with four teams.

== Qualification ==
=== Qualified teams ===
The following four teams qualified for the tournament.

Team	Method of qualification	Appearance	Last appearance as	Years performance			
Team	Method of qualification	Appearance	Last appearance as	Winner(s)	Runners-up	Third	Fourth
FC Iberia 1999	2024 Erovnuli Liga winners	4th	2022 Erovnuli Liga runners-up	1	1	–	1
FC Spaeri	2024 Georgian Cup winners	1st	–	–	–	–	–
Torpedo Kutaisi	2024 Erovnuli Liga runners-up	7th	2023 Erovnuli Liga third place	3	2	1	–
Dila Gori	2024 Erovnuli Liga third place	4th	2022 Erovnuli Liga third place	0	2	–	1

== Matches ==
=== Bracket ===
Semi-finals
26 June 2025 – Tbilisi
FC Iberia 1999	1
Dila Gori	3
27 June 2025 – Tbilisi
FC Spaeri	0(4)
Torpedo Kutaisi	0(3)

Final
2 July 2025 – Tbilisi
Dila Gori	2
FC Spaeri	0
Third place
1 July 2025 – Tbilisi
FC Iberia 1999	0(2)
Torpedo Kutaisi	0(3)

=== Semi-finals ===
26 June 2025
20:00 (UTC+4)

FC Iberia 1999	1–3	Dila Gori
Tabatadze 19'		Bassinga 21'; Andronikashvili 62'; Parulava 79'

David Petriashvili Stadium, Tbilisi
Referee: Giorgi Kruashvili
27 June 2025
20:00 (UTC+4)

FC Spaeri	0–0	Torpedo Kutaisi
Penalties
Samkharadze (penalty scored); Tsetskhladze (penalty scored); Bunturi (penalty missed); Tsetskhladze (penalty scored); Gegiadze (penalty scored)	4–3	(penalty scored) Pires; (penalty missed) Itrak; (penalty scored) Warley; (penalty scored) Mamuchashvili; (penalty missed) Kvirkvelia

David Petriashvili Stadium, Tbilisi
Referee: Giorgi Avazashvili

=== Match for third place ===
1 July 2025
20:00

FC Iberia 1999	0–0	Torpedo Kutaisi
Penalties
Mamageishvili (penalty missed); Sikharulidze (penalty missed); Jgerenaia (penalty scored); Tabatadze (penalty missed); Dadiani (penalty scored)	2–3	(penalty missed) Pires; (penalty scored) Mamuchashvili; (penalty scored) Gudushauri; (penalty missed) Kokhreidze; (penalty scored) Nadaraia

David Petriashvili Stadium, Tbilisi
Referee: Guram Machitidze

=== Final ===
2 July 2025
20:00

Dila Gori	2–0	FC Spaeri
Araujo 86'; Chabradze 90+2'

David Petriashvili Stadium, Tbilisi
Referee: Aleko Aptsiauri

== See also ==
- 2025 Erovnuli Liga
- 2025 Georgian Cup
