= Erovnuli Liga awards =

Men's Georgian Football League awards in Georgia

Erovnuli Liga Awards
- Country: Georgia
- Presented by: Georgian Football Federation
- First award: 2017
- Website: gff.ge

Тhe Erovnuli Liga awards is an annual awards ceremony commemorating association football players, managers and referees involved in the top Georgian football league.

Established after the introduction of the Erovnuli Liga in 2017, the event is usually held at the end of each season by the Georgian Football Federation in Tbilisi, Georgia. Based on surveys among the national team members, football managers, team captains, sport experts and retired players, most outstanding individuals are selected in certain nominations. The vote in general covers not only the first-tier football, but also Georgian footballers playing abroad, the Futsal and Women's leagues.

The winners listed below have been awarded for their contribution specifically to the national league. Although both announced at the same event, the Erovnuli Liga Player of the Year is not to be confused with Georgian Footballer of the Year.

== 2017 Awards ==
Date: 27 December 2017

Venue: Sheraton Metechi Palace, Tbilisi

Award	Winner
Player of the Year	Irakli Sikharulidze (Locomotive Tbilisi)
Goalkeeper of the Year	Roin Kvaskhvadze (Torpedo Kutaisi)
Defender of the Year	Lasha Totadze (Dinamo Tbilisi)
Midfielder of the Year	Giorgi Kharaishvili (Saburtalo Tbilisi)
Forward of the Year	Irakli Sikharulidze (Locomotive Tbilisi)
Foreign Player of the Year	Inters Gui (Samtredia)
U19 Player of the Year	Luka Lakvekheliani (Saburtalo Tbilisi)
U17 Player of the Year	Khvicha Kvaratskhelia (Dinamo Tbilisi)
Referee of the Year	Jenery Khorava

Team of the Season
(Georgia (country)) Roin Kvaskhvadze	Torpedo Kutaisi
(Georgia (country)) Giorgi Kimadze	Torpedo Kutaisi
(Georgia (country)) Lasha Totadze	Dinamo Tbilisi
(Georgia (country)) Giorgi Rekhviashvili	Locomotive Tbilisi
(Georgia (country)) Giorgi Mchedlishvili	Samtredia
(Georgia (country)) Giorgi Kharaishvili	Saburtalo Tbilisi
(Georgia (country)) Giorgi Kukhianidze	Torpedo Kutaisi
(Georgia (country)) Otar Kiteishvili	Dinamo Tbilisi
(Georgia (country)) Grigol Dolidze	Torpedo Kutaisi
(Georgia (country)) Tornike Kapanadze	Torpedo Kutaisi
(Georgia (country)) Irakli Sikharulidze	Locomotive Tbilisi

Manager: (Georgia (country)) Kakhaber Chkhetiani (Torpedo Kutaisi)

== 2018 Awards ==
Date: 28 December 2018

Venue: Tbilisi

Award	Winner
Player of the Year	Giorgi Gabedava (Chikhura Sachkhere)
Goalkeeper of the Year	Roin Kvaskhvadze (Torpedo Kutaisi)
Defender of the Year	Mamuka Kobakhidze (Torpedo Kutaisi)
Midfielder of the Year	Mate Tsintsadze (Torpedo Kutaisi)
Forward of the Year	Giorgi Gabedava (Chikhura Sachkhere)
Foreign Player of the Year	Leandro Ribeiro (Dila Gori)
U19 Player of the Year	Zuriko Davitashvili (Locomotive Tbilisi)
U17 Player of the Year	Nika Talakhadze (Dinamo Tbilisi)
Referee of the Year	Giorgi Kruashvili

Team of the Season
(Georgia (country)) Roin Kvaskhvadze	Torpedo Kutaisi
(Georgia (country)) Mamuka Kobakhidze	Torpedo Kutaisi
(Ukraine) Oleksandr Azatskyi	Torpedo Kutaisi
(Georgia (country)) Giorgi Rekhviashvili	Saburtalo Tbilisi
(Brazil) Leandro Ribeiro	Dila Gori
(Georgia (country)) Mate Tsintsadze	Torpedo Kutaisi
(Georgia (country)) Giorgi Diasamidze	Saburtalo Tbilisi
(Brazil) Vagner Gonçalves	Saburtalo Tbilisi
(Georgia (country)) Giorgi Gabedava	Chikhura Sachkhere
(Ukraine) Mykola Kovtalyuk	Dila Gori
(Georgia (country)) Budu Zivzivadze	Dinamo Tbilisi

Manager: (Georgia (country)) Giorgi Chiabrishvili (Saburtalo Tbilisi)

== 2019 Awards ==
Date: 27 December 2019

Venue: Sheraton Metechi Palace, Tbilisi

Award	Winner
Player of the Year	Flamarion (Dinamo Batumi)
Goalkeeper of the Year	José Perales (Dinamo Tbilisi)
Defender of the Year	Mamuka Kobakhidze (Dinamo Batumi)
Midfielder of the Year	Nika Ninua (Dinamo Tbilisi)
Forward of the Year	Levan Kutalia (Dinamo Tbilisi)
Foreign Player of the Year	Flamarion (Dinamo Batumi)
U19 Player of the Year	Giorgi Guliashvili (Saburtalo Tbilisi)
U17 Player of the Year	Luka Gagnidze (Dinamo Tbilisi)
Referee of the Year	Irakli Kvirikashvili

Team of the Season
(Spain) José Perales	Dinamo Tbilisi
(Georgia (country)) Mamuka Kobakhidze	Dinamo Batumi
(Georgia (country)) Nikoloz Mali	Saburtalo Tbilisi
(Georgia (country)) Guram Giorbelidze	Dila Gori
(Spain) Victor Mongil	Dinamo Tbilisi
(Georgia (country)) Nika Ninua	Dinamo Tbilisi
(Georgia (country)) Sandro Altunashvili	Saburtalo Tbilisi
(Georgia (country)) Levan Shengelia	Dinamo Tbilisi
(Georgia (country)) Giorgi Kokhreidze	Saburtalo Tbilisi
(Georgia (country)) Levan Kutalia	Dinamo Tbilisi
(Brazil) Flamarion	Dinamo Batumi

Manager: (Georgia (country)) Giorgi Geguchadze (Dinamo Batumi)

== 2020 Awards ==
Date: 29 December 2020

The ceremony was cancelled due to COVID-19

Award	Winner
Player of the Year	Irakli Sikharulidze (Locomotive Tbilisi)
Goalkeeper of the Year	Giorgi Mamardashvili (Locomotive Tbilisi)
Defender of the Year	Mamuka Kobakhidze (Dinamo Batumi)
Midfielder of the Year	Beka Dartsmelia (Locomotive Tbilisi)
Forward of the Year	Mykola Kovtalyuk (Dila Gori)
Foreign Player of the Year	Mykola Kovtalyuk (Dila Gori)
U19 Player of the Year	
U17 Player of the Year	
Referee of the Year	Giorgi Kikacheishvili

Team of the Season
(Georgia (country)) Giorgi Mamardashvili	Locomotive Tbilisi
(Georgia (country)) Mamuka Kobakhidze	Dinamo Batumi
(Georgia (country)) Davit Kobouri	Dinamo Tbilisi
(Georgia (country)) Grigol Chabradze	Telavi
(Georgia (country)) Nika Sandokhadze	Locomotive Tbilisi
(Georgia (country)) Nodar Kavtaradze	Dinamo Tbilisi
(Georgia (country)) Sandro Altunashvili	Saburtalo Tbilisi
(Georgia (country)) Beka Dartsmelia	Locomotive Tbilisi
(Georgia (country)) Jaba Jigauri	Dinamo Batumi
(Ukraine) Mykola Kovtalyuk	Dila Gori
(Georgia (country)) Irakli Sikharulidze	Locomotive Tbilisi

Manager: (Georgia (country)) Giorgi Chiabrishvili (Locomotive Tbilisi)

== 2021 Awards ==
Date: 28 December 2021

No ceremony was held due to the COVID-19 pandemic

Award	Winner
Player of the Year	Zoran Marušić (Dinamo Tbilisi)
Goalkeeper of the Year	Lazare Kupatadze (Dinamo Batumi)
Defender of the Year	Irakli Azarovi (Dinamo Batumi)
Midfielder of the Year	Sandro Altunashvili (Dinamo Batumi)
Forward of the Year	Zoran Marušić (Dinamo Tbilisi)
Foreign Player of the Year	Zoran Marušić (Dinamo Tbilisi)
U19 Player of the Year	Saba Khvadagiani (Dinamo Tbilisi)
U17 Player of the Year	Gabriel Sigua (Dinamo Tbilisi)
Referee of the Year	Giorgi Kruashvili

Team of the Season
(Georgia (country)) Lazare Kupatadze	Dinamo Batumi
(Georgia (country)) Mamuka Kobakhidze	Dinamo Batumi
(Georgia (country)) Saba Khvadagiani	Dinamo Tbilisi
(Georgia (country)) Grigol Chabradze	Dinamo Batumi
(Georgia (country)) Irakli Azarovi	Dinamo Batumi
(Georgia (country)) Irakli Bidzinashvili	Dila Gori
(Georgia (country)) Nika Gagnidze	Dila Gori
(Georgia (country)) Sandro Altunashvili	Dinamo Batumi
(Georgia (country)) Jaba Jigauri	Dinamo Batumi
(Serbia) Zoran Marušić	Dinamo Tbilisi
(Georgia (country)) Giorgi Pantsulaia	Dinamo Batumi

Manager: (Georgia (country)) Giorgi Geguchadze (Dinamo Batumi)

== 2022 Awards ==
Date: 26 December 2022

Venue: Sheraton Metechi Palace, Tbilisi

Award	Winner
Player of the Year	Flamarion (Dinamo Batumi)
Goalkeeper of the Year	Luka Kutaladze (Dinamo Tbilisi)
Defender of the Year	Jemal Tabidze (Dinamo Tbilisi)
Midfielder of the Year	Sandro Altunashvili (Dinamo Batumi)
Forward of the Year	Flamarion (Dinamo Batumi)
Foreign Player of the Year	Flamarion (Dinamo Batumi)
U19 Player of the Year	Luka Latsabidze (Dinamo Tbilisi)
U17 Player of the Year	Soso Kopaliani (Locomotive Tbilisi)
Referee of the Year	Aleksandre Aptsiauri

Team of the Season
(Georgia (country)) Luka Kutaladze	Dinamo Tbilisi
(Georgia (country)) Jemal Tabidze	Dinamo Tbilisi
(Portugal) Pedro Monteiro	Torpedo Kutaisi
(Brazil) Wanderson	Dila Gori
(Georgia (country)) Irakli Azarovi	Dinamo Batumi
(Georgia (country)) Anzor Mekvabishvili	Dinamo Tbilisi
(Georgia (country)) Giorgi Gocholeishvili	Saburtalo Tbilisi
(Brazil) Jefinho	Samgurali Tskaltubo
(Brazil) Flamarion	Dinamo Batumi
(Georgia (country)) Davit Skhirtladze	Dinamo Tbilisi
(Georgia (country)) Khvicha Kvaratskhelia	Dinamo Batumi

Manager: (Georgia (country)) Giorgi Chiabrishvili (Dinamo Tbilisi)

== 2023 Awards ==
Date: 4 December and 28 December 2023

Award	Winner
Player of the Year	Flamarion (Dinamo Batumi)
Goalkeeper of the Year	Giorgi Loria (Dinamo Tbilisi)
Defender of the Year	Mamuka Kobakhidze (Dinamo Batumi)
Midfielder of the Year	Giorgi Arabidze (Torpedo Kutaisi)
Forward of the Year	Flamarion (Dinamo Batumi)
Goal of the Year	Tsotne Patsatsia (Dinamo Batumi, vs Telavi, 24 November 2023)
U17 Player of the Year	Rezi Danelia (Dinamo Tbilisi)
U19 Player of the Year	Aleksandre Narimanidze (Saburtalo)
Referee of the Year	Giorgi Kruashvili

Team of the Season
(Georgia (country)) Giorgi Loria	Dinamo Tbilisi
(Georgia (country)) Vladimer Mamuchashvili	Dinamo Batumi
(Georgia (country)) Mamuka Kobakhidze	Dinamo Batumi
(Georgia (country)) Aleksandre Kalandadze	Dinamo Tbilisi
(Georgia (country)) Lasha Shergelashvili	Torpedo Kutaisi
(Georgia (country)) Giorgi Arabidze	Torpedo Kutaisi
(Georgia (country)) Giorgi Zaria	Dinamo Batumi
(Georgia (country)) Merab Gigauri	Torpedo Kutaisi
(Brazil) Flamarion	Dinamo Batumi
(Georgia (country)) Davit Skhirtladze	Dinamo Tbilisi
(Georgia (country)) Paata Gudushauri	Dinamo Batumi

Manager: (Ukraine) Andriy Demchenko (Dila Gori/Dinamo Batumi)

== 2024 Awards ==
Date: 10 December 2024 and 27 December 2024

Venue: Radisson Blu Iveria, Tbilisi

Award	Winner
Player of the Year	Giorgi Kokhreidze (Iberia 1999)
Goalkeeper of the Year	Davit Kereselidze (Dila)
Defender of the Year	Giorgi Jgerenaia (Iberia 1999)
Midfielder of the Year	Otar Mamageishvili (Iberia 1999)
Forward of the Year	Bjørn Maars Johnsen (Torpedo)
Goal of the Year	Tornike Morchiladze (Telavi, vs Samtredia, 11 April 2024)
U17 Player of the Year	Saba Kharebashvili (Dinamo Tbilisi)
U19 Player of the Year	Saba Samushia (Dinamo Tbilisi)
Referee of the Year	Giorgi Kruashvili

Team of the Season
(Georgia (country)) Davit Kereselidze	Dila
(Georgia (country)) Nika Sandokhadze	Torpedo
(Georgia (country)) Giorgi Jgerenaia	Iberia 1999
(Georgia (country)) Lasha Shergelashvili	Torpedo
(Georgia (country)) Tsotne Kapanadze	Iberia 1999
(Georgia (country)) Bakar Kardava	Iberia 1999
(Georgia (country)) Otar Mamageishvili	Iberia 1999
(Georgia (country)) Giorgi Abuashvili	Kolkheti 1913
(Georgia (country)) Giorgi Kokhreidze	Iberia 1999
(Netherlands) Tayrell Wouter	Dila
(Norway) Bjørn Maars Johnsen	Torpedo

Manager: (Georgia (country)) Levan Korghalidze (Iberia 1999)

== 2025 Awards ==
Date: 27 December 2025

Venue: Paragraph Tbilisi

Award	Winner
Player of the Year	Bjørn Maars Johnsen (Torpedo)
Goalkeeper of the Year	Giorgi Makaridze (Iberia 1999)
Defender of the Year	Giorgi Jgerenaia (Iberia 1999)
Midfielder of the Year	Gizo Mamageishvili (Iberia 1999)
Forward of the Year	Bjørn Maars Johnsen (Torpedo)
Goal of the Year	Davit Mujiri (Gagra, vs Iberia 1999, 6 December 2025)
U17 Player of the Year	Andria Bartishvili (Kolkheti 1913)
U19 Player of the Year	Saba Kharebashvili (Dinamo Tbilisi)
Referee of the Year	Goga Kikacheishvili

Team of the Season
(Georgia (country)) Giorgi Makaridze	Iberia 1999
(Brazil) Warley	Torpedo
(Georgia (country)) Giorgi Jgerenaia	Iberia 1999
(Netherlands) Derek Agyakwa	Iberia 1999
(Georgia (country)) Aleko Andronikashvili	Dila
(Georgia (country)) Giorgi Jinjolava	Iberia 1999
(Georgia (country)) Gizo Mamageishvili	Iberia 1999
(Mali) Aboubacar Konté	Dila
(Georgia (country)) Bakar Kardava	Iberia 1999
(Georgia (country)) Giorgi Pantsulaia	Samgurali
(Norway) Bjørn Maars Johnsen	Torpedo

Manager: (Georgia (country)) Guga Nergadze (Iberia 1999)
