= Irakli Sikharulidze =

Georgian footballer

Personal information
- Date of birth: 18 July 1990 (age 36)
- Place of birth: Tbilisi, Georgia
- Height: 1.83 m (6 ft 0 in)
- Position: Striker

Team information
- Current team: Meshakhte
- Number: 9

Youth career
- Dinamo Tbilisi

Senior career*
Years	Team	Apps	(Gls)
2005–2006	Kakheti Telavi	11	(1)
2007	Merani Martvili	1	(0)
2008–2011	Dinamo Tbilisi	21	(4)
2011	WIT Georgia	12	(0)
2012–2015	Metalurgi Rustavi	69	(18)
2014	→ Dinamo Batumi (loan)	12	(6)
2015	Zestaponi	5	(3)
2015–2016	Samtredia	29	(13)
2015–2016	Sioni Bolnisi	12	(3)
2017–2018	Locomotive Tbilisi	33	(25)
2018	Slovácko	0	(0)
2018–2019	Rīgas Futbola Skola	11	(1)
2019–2022	Locomotive Tbilisi	90	(37)
2022–2025	Iberia 1999	116	(25)
2026–	Meshakhte	22	(5)

International career^{‡}
2017–	Georgia	2	(1)
- * Club domestic league appearances and goals as of 31 August 2026 ‡ National team caps and goals as of 13 November 2017

Irakli Sikharulidze (Georgian: ირაკლი სიხარულიძე, romanized: irak'li sikharulidze, pronounced [iɾakʼli siχaɾulidze]; born 18 July 1990) is a professional Georgian football striker who currently plays for Erovnuli Liga club Meshakhte.

Sikharulidze is the winner of the national league and cup competitions. Individually, he was twice recognized as Erovnuli Liga Player of the Year. He finished as the topscorer of the league season in 2017 and later entered the 100 Club comprising Georgian players with a hundred and more goals scored in the top national division. By early March 2025, he had reached the top five of this club.

Sikharulidze was a member of the Georgia national football team, making his debut in 2017 in a friendly game against Cyprus.

== Club career ==
Sikharulidze started his career at Dinamo Tbilisi at the age of 16. Initially he played for the reserves before being promoted to the first team. In early 2012, Sikharulidze moved to Metalurgi for four seasons, although three years later he was among those players who left the club due to financial crisis.

In 2017, Sikharulidze signed with Locomotive. Although his new club finished sixth, the player shone individually by becoming the league topscorer. Besides, he received his first Player of the Year award from the Football Federation. Three years later, with Locomotive still left out of the top three places, Sikharulidze was selected by the Erovnuli Liga as Player of the Year and named in Team of the Season.

On 29 September 2021, Sikharulidze netted his 100th league goal in a 2–2 draw against Dinamo Tbilisi. Having scored 62 times at Locomotive during his four-year tenure, Sikharulidze moved to Saburtalo in early 2022.

On 6 December 2023, he scored an injury-time winner against Dinamo Batumi to secure the Georgian Cup, followed by the league title a year later. In March 2025, Sikharulidze notched a goal against Torpedo to move into the list of all-time top five Georgian topscorers with 124 league goals.

In January 2026, Sikharulidze moved to Meshakhte who had just secured their first promotion to the top flight. His goal in an away 1–0 win over Dila on 12 March marked both the first goal and first victory for the team in the top division.

== International career ==
Sikharulidze received a first call-up to the national team in September 2017 for 2018 FIFA World Cup qualification ties against Ireland and Austria. He made his first appearance for the team on 10 November in a 1–0 friendly win over Cyprus. Three days later, Sikharulidze scored against Belarus.

== Statistics ==
As of 30 August 2026

Appearances and goals by club, season and competition
Club	Season	League			National cup		Continental		Other		Total	
Club	Season	Division	Apps	Goals	Apps	Goals	Apps	Goals	Apps	Goals	Apps	Goals
Dinamo Tbilisi	2009–10	Umaglesi Liga	12	2	2	0	–		–		14	2
Dinamo Tbilisi	2010–11	Umaglesi Liga	6	0	–		1 (Note: Appearances in UEFA Europa League)	0	–		7	0
Dinamo Tbilisi	Total		18	2	2	0	1	0	0	0	21	2
WIT Georgia	2011–12	Umaglesi Liga	12	0	4	2	–		–		16	2
Metalurgi	2011–12	Umaglesi Liga	18	7	2	1	–		–		20	8
Metalurgi	2012–13	Umaglesi Liga	28	8	6	0	3	0	–		37	8
Metalurgi	2013–14	Umaglesi Liga	10	0	4	1	–		–		14	1
Dinamo Batumi (loan)	2013–14	Pirveli Liga	12	6	–		–		–		12	6
Metalurgi	2014–15	Umaglesi Liga	13	3	2	3	–		–		15	6
Metalurgi	Total		69	18	14	5	3	0	0	0	86	23
Zestaponi	2014–15	Umaglesi Liga	5	3	–		–		–		5	3
Samtredia	2015–16	Umaglesi Liga	29	13	6	1	–		–		35	14
Sioni	2016	Umaglesi Liga	12	3	2	0	–		–		14	3
Locomotive	2017	Erovnuli Liga	33	25	–		–		–		33	25
RFS	2018	Virsliga	11	1	2	0	–		–		13	1
Locomotive	2019	Erovnuli Liga	36	16	5	3	–		–		41	19
Locomotive	2020	Erovnuli Liga	18	9	–		3	2	–		21	11
Locomotive	2021	Erovnuli Liga	36	12	3	3	–		–		39	15
Locomotive	Total		123	62	8	6	3	2	0	0	134	70
Saburtalo / Iberia 1999	2022	Erovnuli Liga	33	12	3	1	4 (Note: Appearances in UEFA Conference League)	1	1 (Note: Appearances in Georgian Super Cup)	0	41	14
Saburtalo / Iberia 1999	2023	Erovnuli Liga	31	3	4	1	–		–		35	4
Saburtalo / Iberia 1999	2024	Erovnuli Liga	26	5	1	0	4	0	2	0	33	5
Saburtalo / Iberia 1999	2025	Erovnuli Liga	26	5	2	1	3	0	–		31	6
Saburtalo / Iberia 1999	Total		116	25	10	3	11	1	3	0	140	29
Meshakhte	2026	Erovnuli Liga	22	5	0	0	0	0	0	0	22	5
Career total			429	138	48	17	18	3	3	0	498	154

=== International goals ===
Scores and results list Georgia's goal tally first.

No	Date	Venue	Opponent	Score	Result	Competition
1.	13 November 2017	Ramaz Shengelia Stadium, Kutaisi, Georgia	Belarus	1–1	2–2	Friendly

== Honours ==
=== Club ===
Saburtalo / Iberia 1999

- Erovnuli Liga: 2024
- Georgian Cup: 2023

=== Individual ===
- Erovnuli Liga topscorer: 2017
- Erovnuli Liga Player of the Year: 2017, 2020
- Erovnuli Liga Forward of the Year: 2017
- Erovnuli Liga Team of the Year: 2017, 2020
