= Grigol Chabradze =

Georgian footballer (born 1996)

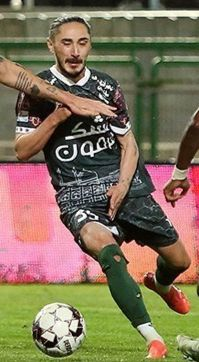

Personal information
- Date of birth: 20 April 1996 (age 30)
- Place of birth: Georgia
- Height: 1.76 m (5 ft 9 in)
- Position: Defender

Team information
- Current team: Qizilqum
- Number: 34

Youth career
- –2015: Saburtalo

Senior career*
Years	Team	Apps	(Gls)
2013–2021	Saburtalo	137	(5)
2020	→ Telavi (loan)	15	(0)
2021–2024	Dinamo Batumi	89	(2)
2024–2025	Zob Ahan	37	(0)
2025	Dila	4	(0)
2026–	Qizilqum	7	(0)

International career^{‡}
2012–2013	Georgia U17	3	(1)
2014–2015	Georgia U19	5	(0)
2016–2017	Georgia U21	7	(0)
2021–2022	Georgia	9	(0)
- * Club domestic league appearances and goals as of 29 July 2026 ‡ National team caps and goals as of 1 May 2023

Grigol "Goga" Chabradze (Georgian: გრიგოლ ჩაბრაძე; born 20 April 1996) is a Georgian footballer who plays as a defender for Uzbekistan Super League club Qizilqum.

Chabradze has played for each of national youth teams. He has won the national league three times, the Georgian Super Cup twice and the Georgian Cup once.

== Club career ==
Chabradze started his professional career at Saburtalo in the 2nd division. He was a regular member of the club which was promoted in 2015. Three years later Chabradze secured his first champion's title with Saburtalo, followed by winning the national Cup.

In early 2020, Chabradze joined newly promoted Erovnuli Liga club Telavi on loan. Due to his performance, he was named in the symbolic team of the season.

In December 2020, he moved to Dinamo Batumi, who a year later won the league for the first time. By the end of 2023, Dinamo had claimed another champion's title and the Super Cup.

In February 2024, Chabradze signed for Iranian club Zob Ahan. He returned to Georgia in June 2025 to join Dila. Shortly he lifted the national super cup followed by the national cup six months later.

== International ==
Chabradze made his international debut for Georgia on 25 March 2021 in a 2022 FIFA World Cup qualification match against Sweden.

== Career statistics ==
=== Club ===
As of match played 10 December 2025

Appearances and goals by club, season and competition
Club	Season	League			National cup (Note: Includes Georgian Cup, Hazfi Cup)		Continental		Other		Total	
Club	Season	Division	Apps	Goals	Apps	Goals	Apps	Goals	Apps	Goals	Apps	Goals
Saburtalo	2013-14	Pirveli Liga	18	3	–		–		–		18	3
Saburtalo	2014-15	Pirveli Liga	33	1	1	0	–		–		34	1
Saburtalo	2015-16	Umaglesi Liga	16	0	–		–		–		18	0
Saburtalo	2016	Umaglesi Liga	12	0	1	0	–		–		13	0
Saburtalo	2017	Erovnuli Liga	10	0	–		–		–		10	0
Saburtalo	2018	Erovnuli Liga	25	0	1	0	–		–		26	0
Saburtalo	2019	Erovnuli Liga	23	1	2	0	1 (Note: Appearance in UEFA Champions League)	0	1 (Note: Appearances in Georgian Super Cup)	0	27	1
Saburtalo	Total		137	5	5	0	1	0	1	0	144	5
Telavi (loan)	2020	Erovnuli Liga	15	0	3	0	–		–		18	0
Dinamo Batumi	2021	Erovnuli Liga	28	2	2	0	6 (Note: Appearances in UEFA Conference League)	0	–		36	2
Dinamo Batumi	2022	Erovnuli Liga	32	0	1	0	4 (Note: Two appearances in UEFA Champions League, two appearances in UEFA Conference League)	0	–		37	0
Dinamo Batumi	2023	Erovnuli Liga	29	0	2	0	2	0	2	0	35	0
Dinamo Batumi	Total		89	2	5	0	12	0	2	0	108	2
Zob Ahan	2023–24	Persian Gulf League	12	0	1	0	–		–		13	0
Zob Ahan	2024–25	Persian Gulf League	25	0	0	0	–		–		25	0
Zob Ahan	Total		37	0	1	0	–		–		38	0
Dila	2025	Erovnuli Liga	4	0	1	0	4	0	1	1	10	1
Career total			282	7	15	0	17	0	4	1	318	8

=== International ===
As of 29 March 2022

Georgia
Year	Apps	Goals
2021	7	0
2022	2	0
Total	9	0

== Honours ==
Saburtalo

- Erovnuli Liga: 2018
- Georgian Cup: 2019

Dinamo Batumi

- Erovnuli Liga: 2021, 2023
- Georgian Super Cup: 2022

Dila

- Georgian Super Cup: 2025
- Georgian Cup: 2025

Individual

- Erovnuli Liga Team of the Year: 2020
