= Sandro Altunashvili =

Georgian footballer (born 1997)

Personal information
- Date of birth: 19 May 1997 (age 29)
- Place of birth: Tbilisi, Georgia
- Height: 1.70 m (5 ft 7 in)
- Position: Midfielder

Team information
- Current team: Dinamo Batumi
- Number: 8

Senior career*
| Years | Team | Apps | (Gls) |
| 2014–2021 | Saburtalo | 143 | (5) |
| 2021–2023 | Dinamo Batumi | 82 | (4) |
| 2023–2025 | Wolfsberger AC | 45 | (1) |
| 2025 | Iberia 1999 | 12 | (0) |
| 2026 | Hapoel Haifa | 14 | (0) |
| 2026– | Dinamo Batumi | 0 | (0) |

International career^{‡}
| 2015–2018 | Georgia U19 | 10 | (0) |
| 2016–2017 | Georgia U21 | 5 | (0) |
| 2021– | Georgia | 8 | (0) |
- * Club domestic league appearances and goals as of 24 June 2026 ‡ National team caps and goals as of 6 October 2024

Sandro Altunashvili (Order of Honor) (Georgian: სანდრო ალთუნაშვილი; born 19 May 1997) is a Georgian professional footballer who plays as a midfielder for Erovnuli Liga club Dinamo Batumi.

He is the two-time winner of the Erovnuli Liga. Altunashvili has also won the Georgian Cup once and Super Cup twice. Individually, he has been twice recognized as the Erovnuli Liga Midfielder of the Year and three times named in Team of the Season.

== Club career ==
Altunashvili started his career at second-division club Saburtalo in 2014. He was a regular player of the team that first gained promotion, gradually established itself and started winning trophies in Erovnuli Liga. His club secured the league title in 2018. A year later Altunashvili lifted the national Cup as well. This season he was selected in Team of the Year for the first time.

In early 2021, Altunashvili moved to Dinamo Batumi on a two-year deal. For two consecutive years he won a nomination for the best midfielder of the league, drawing interest from the national team.

In June 2023, he left his native Georgia to join Austrian Bundesliga club Wolfsberger AC on a two-year contract with the option for a further year. On 3 November 2024, Altunashvili scored his first goal in a 2–1 loss at Austria Klagenfurt.

In early July, Dinamo Batumi announced the return of Altunashvili on a deal until the end of 2028.

== International career ==
Altunashvili made his debut for the Georgia national team on 5 September 2021 in a World Cup qualifier against Spain, a 0–4 away loss. He substituted Giorgi Aburjania in the 69th minute.

Altunashvili received a call-up for Euro 2024, Georgia's first major international tournament, and took part in two matches.

== Career statistics ==
As of match played 24 June 2026

Appearances and goals by club, season and competition
| Club | Season | League | | | National cup | | Continental | | Other | | Total | |
| Club | Season | Division | Apps | Goals | Apps | Goals | Apps | Goals | Apps | Goals | Apps | Goals |
|---|---|---|---|---|---|---|---|---|---|---|---|---|
| Saburtalo | 2013/14 | Pirveli Liga | 1 | 0 | 0 | 0 | 0 | 0 | 0 | 0 | 1 | 0 |
| Saburtalo | 2014/15 | Pirveli Liga | 33 | 1 | 1 | 0 | 0 | 0 | 0 | 0 | 34 | 1 |
| Saburtalo | 2015/16 | Umaglesi Liga | 24 | 1 | 0 | 0 | 2 (Note: Appearances in UEFA Youth League) | 0 | 0 | 0 | 26 | 1 |
| Saburtalo | 2016 | Umaglesi Liga | 6 | 0 | 1 | 0 | 0 | 0 | 0 | 0 | 7 | 0 |
| Saburtalo | 2017 | Erovnuli Liga | 11 | 1 | 0 | 0 | 0 | 0 | 0 | 0 | 11 | 1 |
| Saburtalo | 2018 | Erovnuli Liga | 21 | 0 | 1 | 0 | 0 | 0 | 0 | 0 | 22 | 0 |
| Saburtalo | 2019 | Erovnuli Liga | 29 | 2 | 5 | 0 | 6 (Note: 4 appearances in UEFA Champions League and 2 appearances in Conference League) | 1 | 1 (Note: Appearances in Georgian Super Cup) | 0 | 41 | 3 |
| Saburtalo | 2020 | Erovnuli Liga | 18 | 0 | 3 | 0 | 1 (Note: Appearance in UEFA Europa League) | 0 | 1 | 0 | 23 | 0 |
| Saburtalo | Total | | 143 | 5 | 11 | 0 | 9 | 1 | 2 | 0 | 165 | 6 |
| Dinamo Batumi | 2021 | Erovnuli Liga | 33 | 2 | 3 | 0 | 6 (Note: Appearances in UEFA Conference League) | 0 | 0 | 0 | 42 | 2 |
| Dinamo Batumi | 2022 | Erovnuli Liga | 31 | 1 | 1 | 0 | 4 (Note: 2 appearances in UEFA Champions League and 2 appearances in Conference League) | 0 | 1 | 0 | 37 | 1 |
| Dinamo Batumi | 2023 | Erovnuli Liga | 18 | 1 | 0 | 0 | 0 | 0 | 0 | 0 | 18 | 1 |
| Dinamo Batumi | Total | | 82 | 4 | 4 | 0 | 10 | 0 | 1 | 0 | 97 | 4 |
| Wolfsberger AC | 2023–24 | Austrian Bundesliga | 27 | 0 | 1 | 0 | 0 | 0 | 0 | 0 | 28 | 0 |
| Wolfsberger AC | 2024–25 | Austrian Bundesliga | 18 | 1 | 3 | 0 | 0 | 0 | 0 | 0 | 21 | 1 |
| Wolfsberger AC | Total | | 45 | 1 | 4 | 0 | 0 | 0 | 0 | 0 | 49 | 1 |
| FC Iberia 1999 | 2025 | Erovnuli Liga | 12 | 0 | 3 | 0 | 0 | 0 | 0 | 0 | 15 | 0 |
| Hapoel Haifa | 2025–26 | Israeli Premier League | 14 | 0 | 0 | 0 | 0 | 0 | 0 | 0 | 14 | 0 |
| Career total | | | 296 | 10 | 22 | 0 | 19 | 1 | 3 | 0 | 340 | 11 |

== Honours ==
Saburtalo Tbilisi

- Erovnuli Liga: 2021
- Georgian Cup: 2019
- Georgian Super Cup: 2020

Dinamo Batumi

- Erovnuli Liga: 2021
- Georgian Super Cup: 2022

Individual

- Erovnuli Liga Midfielder of the Year: 2021, 2022
