= Giorgi Jinjolava =

Georgian association football player

Personal information
- Full name: Jemali-Giorgi Jinjolava
- Date of birth: 28 June 2000 (age 26)
- Place of birth: Tbilisi, Georgia
- Height: 1.81 m (5 ft 11 in)
- Position: Defender

Team information
- Current team: FC Iberia 1999
- Number: 5

Youth career
- 2017-2018: FC Iberia 1999

Senior career*
Years	Team	Apps	(Gls)
2018–2019	FC Iberia 1999 B	2	(0)
2019-2020	CF Benidorm	9	(1)
2020	→ FC Locomotive Tbilisi (loan)	2	(0)
2021	FC Iberia 1999	14	(0)
2021-2022	→ Cádiz CF Mirandilla (loan)	18	(3)
2022-2023	FC Iberia 1999	47	(2)
2024	→ FC ViOn Zlaté Moravce (loan)	4	(1)
2024–	FC Iberia 1999	62	(10)

International career^{‡}
2016–2017	Georgia national under-17 football team	2	(0)
2017–2018	Georgia national under-19 football team	6	(0)
2020–2023	Georgia national under-21 football team	8	(0)
- * Club domestic league appearances and goals as of 30 October 2026 ‡ National team caps and goals as of 30 October 2026

Jemali-Giorgi Jinjolava (Georgian: ჯემალ-გიორგი ჯინჯოლავა; born 28 June 2000) is a Georgian professional footballer who plays as a defender for Iberia 1999.

He is the two-time winner of the national league.

== Career ==
=== Club career ===
Jinjolava was developed in the Saburtalo youth academy. He made his professional debut on 13 June 2018 in a Georgian Cup match against WIT Georgia, which Saburtalo lost on penalties.

On 5 September 2019, Jinjolava joined Spanish club Benidorm on loan, playing in the Regional Preferente Valenciana for six months. In January 2020, he was loaned to Lokomotivi Tbilisi.

In 2021, Jinjolava returned to Saburtalo and played regularly in the starting lineup during the first half of the season. On 1 July, he moved to Spanish club Cádiz on loan, featuring for the reserve team, Cádiz B, until the end of the season.

After returning to Georgia, Jinjolava scored his first goal for Saburtalo on 24 May 2023 against Samgurali, helping his team to a 5–1 victory.

In February 2024, Jinjolava joined Slovak side ViOn Zlaté Moravce on loan for the remainder of the season. Since 2024, he has been playing for Iberia 1999.

Jinjolava has since twice become the winner of the Erovnuli Liga, receiving a personal recognition as well as he was named in Team of the Season in 2025.

=== International career ===
Jinjolava has represented Georgia at youth levels, playing for the U17, U18, U19, U20, and U21 national teams.

On 15 June 2023, he was named to Georgia's squad for the 2023 UEFA European Under-21 Championship.

== Honours ==
=== Club ===
Iberia 1999

- Erovnuli Liga winner (2): 2024, 2025

=== Individual ===
Erovnuli Liga Team of the Year: 2025
