= Giorgi Chiabrishvili =

Georgian football manager (born 1979)

Personal information
- Date of birth: 7 October 1979 (age 47)
- Place of birth: Tbilisi, Georgian SSR, Soviet Union

Team information
- Current team: Dinamo Batumi (manager)

Managerial career
- Years: Team
- 2008–2011: Zestaponi (assistant manager)
- 2011–2012: Zestaponi
- 2014–2015: Saburtalo
- 2016–2017: Georgia U21 (assistant head coach)
- 2016–2019: Saburtalo
- 2020–2021: Locomotive
- 2022–2023: Dinamo Tbilisi
- 2024–: Dinamo Batumi

Giorgi (Gia) Chiabrishvili (Georgian: გიორგი ჭიაბრიშვილი; born 7 October 1979) is a Georgian football manager, currently working as head coach of Erovnuli Liga club Dinamo Batumi.

A three-time winner of the national top division with different clubs, he was named as Erovnuli Liga Manager of the Year three times.

== Career ==
Chiabrishvili started his career at Zestaponi in 2008 as assistant head coach under Gia Gegichadze. The club was competing for top titles, becoming the champions for the first time in 2011. When Geguchadze unexpectedly left the club in mid-August 2012 two days prior to an Europa League tie against Brugge, Chiabrishvili took over. His first game in charge ended 3–3 after an entertaining second-half triller.

Zestaponi defended the champion's title in 2012 in dramatic circumstances, with their 32-years-old coach lifting his first top trophy, although the team sustained a painful defeat in the Georgian Cup final and an early exit from their European campaign.

In 2014, Chiabrishvili was appointed as head coach of 2nd division side Saburtalo. He led the team to their first ever promotion to the top division in the same season. In 2018, Saburtalo who had not won any silverware during the previous three seasons in the top flight, claimed the champion's title for the first time under coach Gia Chiabrishvili. The latter was selected as Coach of the Season at a ceremony held by the Georgian Football Federation.

Saburtalo made their debut in European competitions with a thumping away win over Moldovan champions Sheriff the next summer. They also secured the Georgian Cup, but Chiabrishvili announced his resignation right after the final.

In July 2020, he signed a 3.5-year contract with Locomotive. His team performed in the UEFA Europa League beyond expectations, knocking out Craiova and Dinamo Moscow. Although Locomotive finished the league season below the top three clubs, Chiabrishvili was hailed again, becoming Coach of the Year for the second time now.

In June 2022, Chiabrishvili replaced head coach Kakhaber Tskhadadze at Dinamo Tbilisi. Under his guidance, the team overcame a nine-point deficit over reigning champions Dinamo Batumi and reclaimed the top spot. For this achievement, he was once again named Manager of the Year, but the sides parted ways after Dinamo's dismal performance in the UEFA Conference League the next summer.

On 18 October 2024, Chiabrishvili was introduced as head coach at Dinamo Batumi.

== Honours ==
=== Club ===
Zestaponi

- Umaglesi Liga winner: 2011–12
- Georgian Cup runner-up: 2011–12

Saburtalo

- Pirveli Liga winner: 2014–15
- Erovnuli Liga winner: 2018
- Georgian Cup: 2019

Dinamo Tbilisi

- Erovnuli Liga winner: 2022

=== Individual ===
Erovnuli Liga Coach of the Year: 2018, 2020, 2022
