= Gizo Mamageishvili =

Georgian footballer (born 2003)

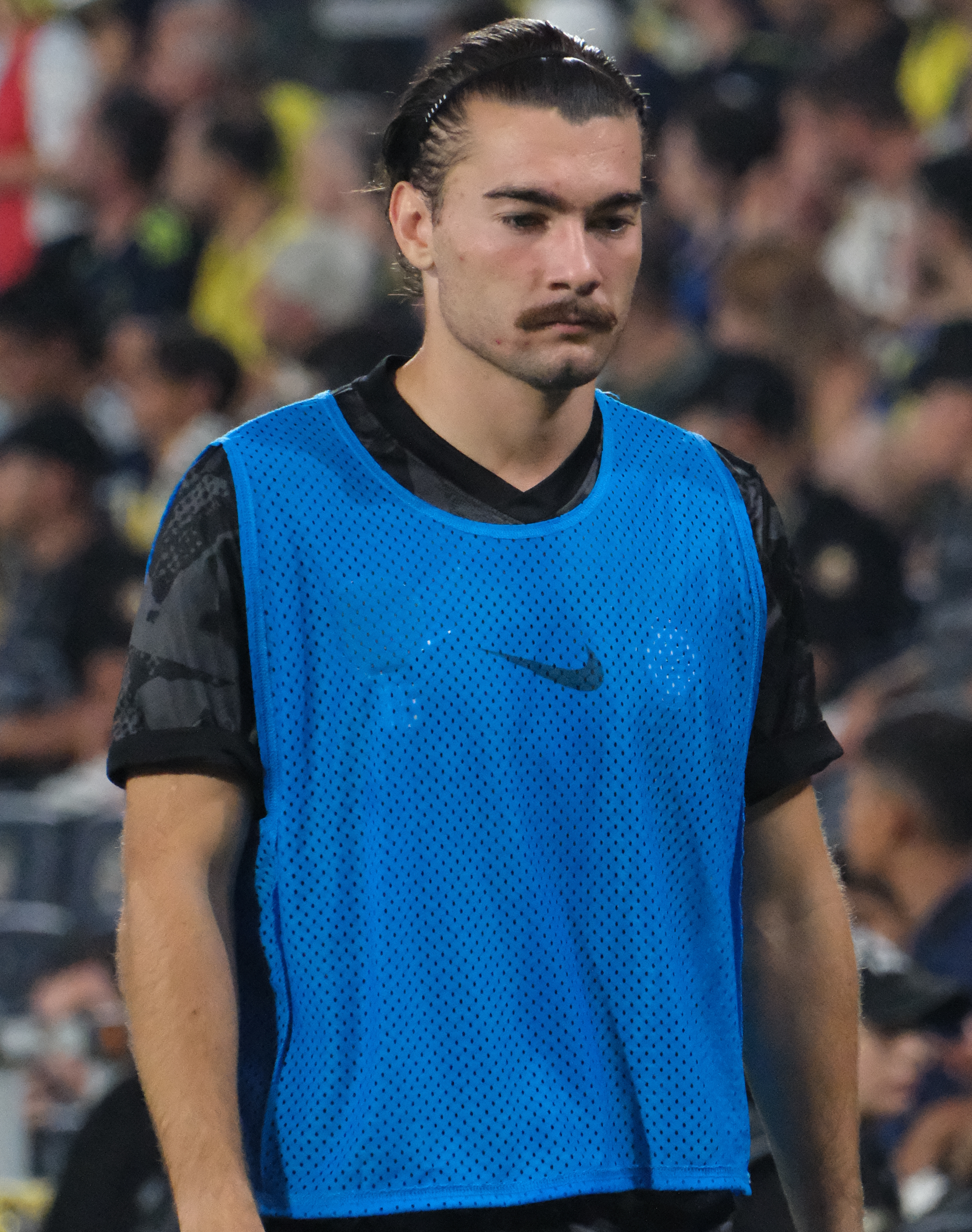

Personal information
- Date of birth: 15 January 2003 (age 23)
- Height: 1.80 m (5 ft 11 in)
- Position: Midfielder

Team information
- Current team: SK Sturm Graz
- Number: 15

Youth career
- 2009–2020: Saburtalo

Senior career*
Years	Team	Apps	(Gls)
2021–2025	Iberia 1999	112	(16)
2026–	Sturm Graz	20	(2)

International career^{‡}
2020	Georgia U17	3	(0)
2021–2022	Georgia U19	6	(2)
2022–2025	Georgia U21	15	(2)
2026–	Georgia	5	(0)
- * Club domestic league appearances and goals as of 20 September 2026 ‡ National team caps and goals as of 6 October 2026

Gizo Mamageishvili (Georgian: გიზო მამაგეიშვილი; born 15 January 2003) is a Georgian professional footballer who plays as a midfielder for Austrian Bundesliga club SK Sturm Graz and the Georgia national team.

Mamageishvili has represented his country in all national youth teams, including in the 2025 UEFA European Under-21 Championship. He has won the Erovnuli Liga once and the national cup twice. Besides, Mamageishvili was named as Midfielder of the Year and Team of the Year following the 2025 season.

== Career ==
=== Club ===
Mamageishvili entered Saburtalo's academy at the age of six. Having come through the club's youth ranks, he played for the reserve team before making his first-team debut in the Erovnuli Liga at 17 against Samtredia on the final day of the 2020 season. The next year, Mamageishvili lifted the first trophy after his team cruised to victory over Samgurali in the cup final. Mamageishvili scored his first top-flight goal on 18 March 2023 in a 3–3 away draw against Samtredia.

On 7 December 2023, Saburtalo claimed the second cup title following a narrow injury-time victory over Dinamo Batumi with Mamageishvili playing full time. Overall, he took part in three matches of Saburtalo's cup campaign this season.

As the club changed its name to Iberia 1999 in early 2024, Mamageishvili became the league champion for the first time in his career. On 1 December 2024, he came off the bench and equalized, and later provided an assist in a 2–1 champion's decider against Gagra. His overall personal contribution to this league success amounted to six goals and four assists. A year later, Mamageishvili, being the team captain now, helped the team to defend the title and, besides, received more individual recognition. Apart from being named in Team of the Year, he was named as Midfielder of the Year by the Erovnuli Liga.

In December 2025, Mamageishvili signed with SK Sturm Graz on a 3,5 year-long deal.

=== International ===
Mamageishvili was fifteen years old when he was called up to the U15 team.

After taking part in three 2020 UEFA under 17 Championship qualifiers in the autumn of 2019, Mamageishvili joined U19s. He played all six matches of the first and elite rounds of the 2022 UEFA European under-19 Championship qualifiers, scoring winners against Norway on 12 October 2022 and Croatia on 29 March 2023.

Mamageishvili was among the players called up for the U21 team which participated in 2023 UEFA European Championship co-hosted by Georgia.

In 2023–24, Mamageishvili played in eight games of Georgia's 2025 UEFA Championship qualifying campaign. While his team reached the final stage of the competition via play-offs after beating Croatia, Mamageishvili netted in a 3–0 home win against Moldova on 5 September 2023.

== Career statistics ==
=== Club ===
As of 20 September 2026

Appearances and goals by club, season and competition
Club	Season	League			National cup		Continental		Other		Total	
Club	Season	Division	Apps	Goals	Apps	Goals	Apps	Goals	Apps	Goals	Apps	Goals
Iberia 1999	2020	Erovnuli Liga	1	0	—		—		—		1	0
Iberia 1999	2021	Erovnuli Liga	3	0	—		—		—		3	0
Iberia 1999	2022	Erovnuli Liga	20	0	3	0	4 (Note: Appearances in UEFA Conference League)	0	—		27	0
Iberia 1999	2023	Erovnuli Liga	29	4	3	0	—		—		32	4
Iberia 1999	2024	Erovnuli Liga	24	6	1	0	3	0	2 (Note: Appearance in Georgian Super Cup)	0	30	6
Iberia 1999	2025	Erovnuli Liga	35	6	4	2	2 (Note: Appearances in UEFA Champions League)	0	—		41	8
Iberia 1999	Total		112	16	11	2	9	0	2	0	134	18
Iberia 1999 B	2021	Liga 3	—		1	0	—		—		1	0
Iberia 1999 B	2022	Liga 3	—		1	0	—		—		1	0
Iberia 1999 B	2024	Liga 3	—		—		—		1 (Note: Appearance in Liga 2/3 promotion play-offs)	1	1	1
Iberia 1999 B	Total		0	0	2	0	0	0	1	1	3	1
Sturm Graz	2025–26	Austrian Bundesliga	13	1	—		2 (Note: Appearances in UEFA Champions League)	0	—		15	1
Sturm Graz	2026–27	Austrian Bundesliga	7	1	2	1	3 (Note: Two appearances in UEFA Champions League, one appearance in UEFA Europa League)	0	—		12	2
Sturm Graz	Total		20	2	2	1	5	0	—		27	3
Career total			132	18	15	3	14	0	3	1	164	22

=== International ===
As of match played 5 October 2026

Appearances and goals by national team and year
National team	Year	Apps	Goals
Georgia	2026	5	0
Total		5	0

== Honours ==
=== Club ===
==== Saburtalo / Iberia 1999 ====
- Erovnuli Liga (2): 2024, 2025
- Georgian Cup (2): 2021, 2023

=== Individual ===
- Erovnuli Liga Midfielder of the Year 2025
- Erovnuli Liga Team of the Year: 2025

== Personal life ==
Gizo's twin brother Otar Mamageishvili was his teammate both at the club and national youth teams.
