= Aleko Andronikashvili =

Georgian association football player

Aleksandre Andronikashvili
Personal information
- Date of birth: 9 April 1999 (age 27)
- Place of birth: Georgia
- Height: 1.87 m (6 ft 2 in)
- Position: Defender

Team information
- Current team: Dila
- Number: 6

Youth career
- 35-e skola

Senior career*
Years	Team	Apps	(Gls)
2013–2015	35-e skola	38	(4)
2017–2022	Locomotive	77	(1)
2023	Shukura	19	(0)
2024–	Dila	74	(11)

International career^{‡}
2016	Georgia U17	1	(0)
2017	Georgia U19	2	(0)
2019–2020	Georgia U21	6	(0)
- * Club domestic league appearances and goals as of 10 December 2025 ‡ National team caps and goals as of 7 April 2025

Aleksandre "Aleko" Andronikashvili (Georgian: ალეკო ანდრონიკაშვილი) is a Georgian footballer who plays as a centre back for Erovnuli Liga club Dila.

Andronikashvili was a member of all national youth teams.

== Career ==
=== Club ===
Andronikashvili started his career at Meore Liga side 35th Football School before signing a three- year contract with Locomotive in January 2017. He made his debut for the senior team on 20 June in a 3–0 win over Chikhura.

During his six-year period at Locomotive, Andronikashvili was twice close to winning the national cup, but in both occasions his team lost the final. In 2020, He made his first European appearance in a 2–1 win over Romanian club Universitatea.

In February 2023, Andronikashvili moved to recently promoted Erovnuli Liga side Shukura, but after a few months joined more ambitious Dila. In the same summer, he took part in three UEFA Conference League games.

In 2024, Andronikashvili featured in 30 league matches, helping the team record a top-three finish. A year later, he netted eight times. As Dila finished in second place, Andronikashvili was named in Team of the Year.

=== International ===
Andronikashvili played for national youth teams starting from U17s. He made most appearances for the U21 team, taking part in six 2021 UEFA European Championship qualifiers.

== Statistics ==
As of match played 10 December 2025

Appearances and goals by club, season and competition
Club	Season	League			National cup		Continental		Other		Total	
Club	Season	Division	Apps	Goals	Apps	Goals	Apps	Goals	Apps	Goals	Apps	Goals
35-e skola	2014–15	Meore Liga	14	0	–		–		–		14	0
35-e skola	2015–16	Meore Liga	24	4	–		–		–		24	4
35-e skola	Total		38	4	0	0	0	0	0	0	38	4
Locomotive	2017	Erovnuli Liga	8	0	–		–		–		8	0
Locomotive	2018	Erovnuli Liga	2	0	–		–		–		2	0
Locomotive	2019	Erovnuli Liga	6	0	2	1	–		–		8	1
Locomotive	2020	Erovnuli Liga	9	0	1	0	1 (Note: Appearance in UEFA Europa League)	0	–		11	0
Locomotive	2021	Erovnuli Liga	24	0	3	0	–		–		27	0
Locomotive	2022	Erovnuli Liga	28	1	1	1	–		–		29	2
Locomotive	Total		77	1	7	1	1	0	0	0	88	2
Locomotive B	2022	Liga 4	–		4	0	–		–		4	0
Shukura	2023	Erovnuli Liga	19	0	–		–		–		19	0
Dila	2023	Erovnuli Liga	11	1	2	0	3 (Note: Appearances in UEFA Conference League)	0	1 (Note: Appearances in Georgian Super Cup)	0	17	1
Dila	2024	Erovnuli Liga	30	2	1	0	–		–		31	2
Dila	2025	Erovnuli Liga	33	8	3	1	4	1	2	1	42	11
Dila	Total		74	11	6	1	7	1	3	1	90	14
Career total			208	16	17	3	8	1	3	1	236	21

== Honours ==
=== Club ===
Dila

- Georgian Cup winner: 2025
- Erovnuli Liga runner-up: 2025

=== Individual ===
- Erovnuli Liga Team of the Year: 2025
