= Diego Longo =

Football manager

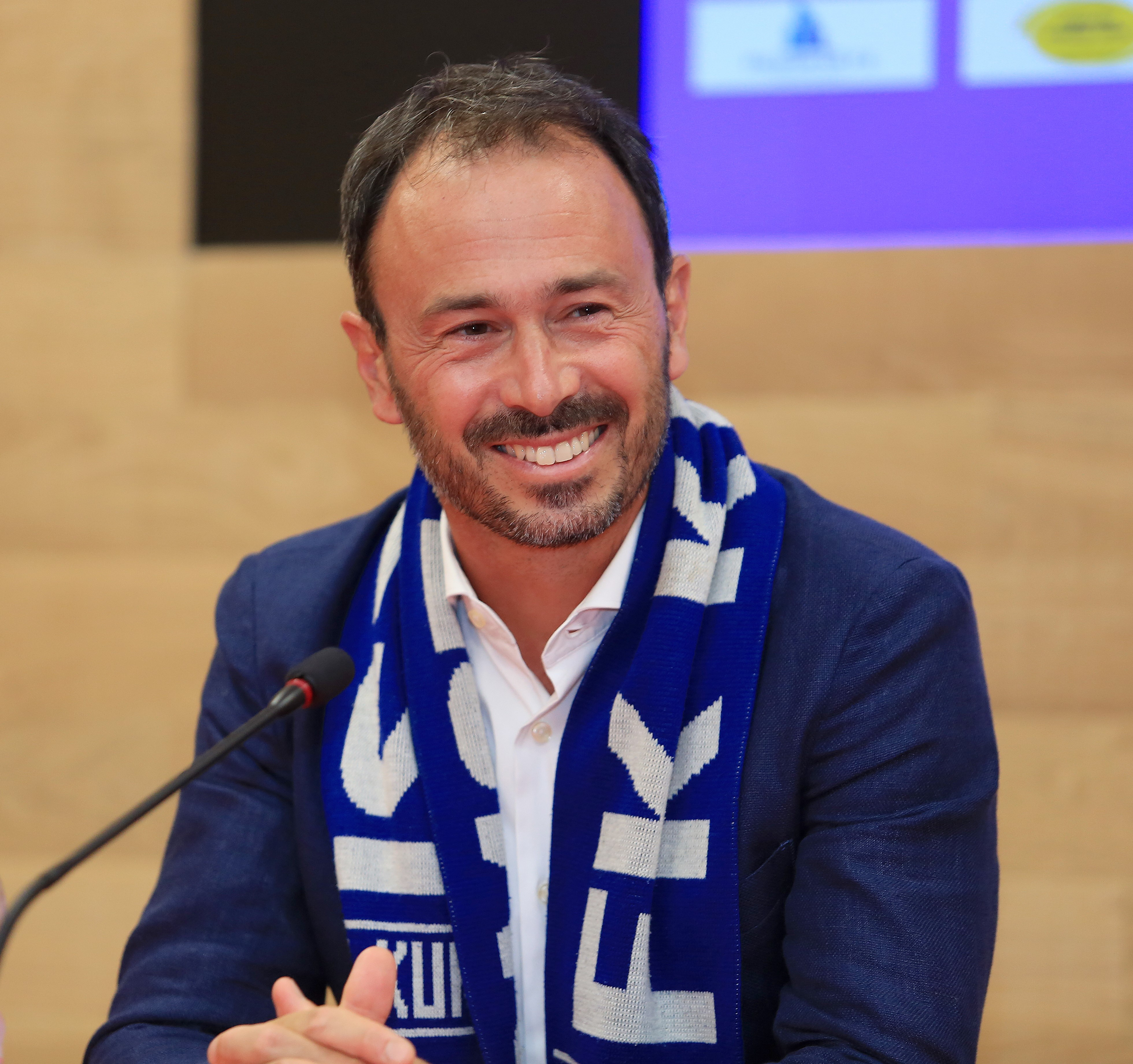

Personal information
- Date of birth: 29 January 1976 (age 50)
- Place of birth: Genoa, Italy

Managerial career
- Years: Team
- 2005–2007: Rapid București (fitness coach)
- 2007–2009: FC Brașov (fitness coach)
- 2009–2011: Romania (fitness coach)
- 2011–2012: Rapid București (fitness coach)
- 2012–2014: El Jaish (fitness coach)
- 2014: Petrolul Ploiești (fitness coach)
- 2014–2017: Xanthi (assistant)
- 2017–2019: PAOK (assistant)
- 2019–2020: Al Hilal (assistant)
- 2020–2021: Dynamo Kyiv (assistant)
- 2021–2022: Kukësi
- 2023: Flamurtari
- 2023: Teuta
- 2023–2024: Chindia Târgoviște
- 2024–2025: Sestri Levante
- 2025–: Dila

Diego Longo (born 25 January 1976) is an Italian professional football manager, currently in charge of Erovnuli Liga club Dila.

== Career ==
In 2005, Longo was appointed assistant manager of Romanian side Rapid. In 2019, he was appointed assistant manager of Al Hilal (Saudi Arabia) in Saudi Arabia.

On 17 December 2024, Longo returned to Italy, being appointed in charge of Serie C club Sestri Levante. He was sacked on 2 March 2025, leaving the club dead last in the league table.

On 13 June 2025, Erovnuli Liga club Dila announced the appointment of Longo as their new head coach.

== Managerial statistics ==
As of 1 March 2025

Team	Nat	From	To	Record							
Team	Nat	From	To	P	W	D	L	GF	GA	GD	W%
Kukësi	(Albania)	15 July 2021	28 May 2022	40	17	11	12	56	47	+9	42.5
Flamurtari	(Albania)	24 March 2023	30 June 2023	8	3	3	2	9	5	+4	37.5
Teuta	(Albania)	1 July 2023	24 September 2023	4	1	1	2	4	10	−6	25.0
Chindia Târgoviște	(Romania)	20 November 2023	30 May 2024	12	6	2	4	18	9	+9	50.0
Sestri Levante	(Italy)	17 December 2024	2 March 2025	10	1	4	5	8	12	−4	10.0
Total				74	28	21	25	95	83	+12	37.8

== Honours ==
Dila

- Georgian Cup: 2025
- Georgian Super Cup: 2025
- Erovnuli Ligaː Runners-up 2025
