= Davit Kereselidze =

Georgian footballer (born 1999)

Personal information
- Date of birth: 19 August 1999 (age 27)
- Place of birth: Tbilisi, Georgia
- Height: 1.91 m (6 ft 3 in)
- Position: Goalkeeper

Team information
- Current team: Dila
- Number: 1

Senior career*
Years	Team	Apps	(Gls)
2014–2018	Tskhinvali	25	(0)
2019–2021	Gagra	52	(0)
2022–2023	Dinamo Tbilisi	21	(0)
2024–	Dila	71	(0)

International career^{‡}
2025–	Georgia	1	(0)
- * Club domestic league appearances and goals as of 24 May 2026 ‡ National team caps and goals as of 5 June 2025

Davit Kereselidze (Georgian: დავით კერესელიძე; born 19 August 1999) is a Georgian professional footballer who plays as a goalkeeper for Erovnuli Liga club Dila and the Georgia national team.

Kereselidze is the winner of all three domestic competitions. Individually, he was named Goalkeeper of the Year in 2024.

== Career ==
=== Club ===
Well before starting his professional career, Kereselidze was noticed during the 2012 Daraselia Cup tournament where he received a special individual award. In 2015 and 2016, he was called up to the U17 team for UEFA European Championship qualifiers.

Kereselidze made his league debut for 2nd division club Tskhinvali as a substitute in a 4–3 win over Zugdidi on 21 April 2017. He remained with the club until its relegation the next year.

After joining Gagra, Kereselidze took part in all 18 league games in 2020 without being substituted. He was a member of the U21 squad that held two matches of their 2021 European Championship qualifying campaign in October.

In the same year, Gagra won the national cup with Kereselidze keeping five clean sheets in as many matches. This achievement enabled the team, being still in the 2nd tier of Georgian football, to participate in the UEFA Conference League a year later. Kereselidze made his first European appearance against Montenegrin side Sutjeska on 15 July 2021.

The 2021 season was successful for Gagra who earned promotion to the top division after a decade-long absence. Kereselidze played in 34 league matches in addition to two playoff ties in which his team prevailed over Shukura without conceding a goal.

At the end of this season, the 22-year-old goalkeeper moved to Dinamo Tbilisi on a three-year deal. Kereselidze made his debut for his new club in a 4–0 win over Torpedo on 25 February 2022. In the next game held against Dinamo Batumi a week later, he suffered an injury requiring surgery on his shoulder. For this reason, he was out of action until August.

Kereselidze won his first golden medals with Dinamo in 2022, followed by the Supercup title the next summer. After this season he left the club and signed with Dila.

The 2024 season turned out special for Kereselidze who was voted by the Erovnuli Liga as Goalkeeper of the Year and included in Team of the Year. During this period, he kept 15 clean sheets and saved four penalties, including twice against Kolkheti 1913 on 16 April. His performance helped the team to climb back into the top three after a year-long pause.

Kereselidze was widely hailed in a goalless draw against Dinamo Tbilisi on 20 May 2026 as he quickly provided a first aid to the team captain Ramaric Etou who had lost consciousness after a severe collision, leading to an urgent surgery.

=== National team ===
Kereselidze received his first call-up to the national team for friendlies against Faroe Islands and Cape Verde. He made his debut as a substitute in a 1–0 home win over the Faroese on 5 June 2025.

== Honours ==
=== Club ===
Dinamo Tbilisi

- Erovnuli Liga: 2020
- Supercup: 2023

Gagra

- Georgian Cup: 2020

Dila

- Georgian Cup: 2025
- Super Cup: 2025

=== Individual ===
- Erovnuli Liga Goalkeeper of the Year: 2024
- Erovnuli Liga Team of the Year: 2024
