= Bjørn Maars Johnsen =

Norwegian footballer (born 1991)

Bjørn Johnsen
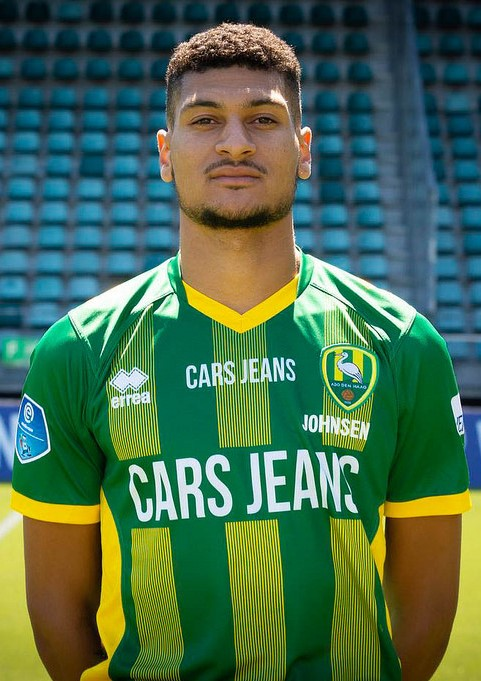
- Johnsen with ADO Den Haag in 2018

Personal information
- Full name: Bjørn Maars Johnsen
- Date of birth: 6 November 1991 (age 35)
- Place of birth: New York City, United States
- Height: 1.96 m (6 ft 5 in)
- Position: Forward

Team information
- Current team: Ordabasy
- Number: 28

Youth career
- 2010: Vålerenga

Senior career*
| Years | Team | Apps | (Gls) |
| 2011 | Tønsberg | 10 | (3) |
| 2011 | Úbeda Viva | 3 | (3) |
| 2012 | Antequera | 13 | (3) |
| 2012–2013 | Atlético Baleares | 10 | (0) |
| 2013–2014 | Louletano | 28 | (10) |
| 2014–2015 | Atlético CP | 27 | (14) |
| 2015–2016 | Litex Lovech | 33 | (12) |
| 2016 | Litex Lovech II | 6 | (5) |
| 2016–2017 | Heart of Midlothian | 34 | (6) |
| 2017–2018 | ADO Den Haag | 34 | (19) |
| 2018–2020 | AZ | 22 | (6) |
| 2019 | → Rosenborg (loan) | 11 | (5) |
| 2020 | Ulsan Hyundai | 18 | (5) |
| 2021–2022 | CF Montréal | 26 | (2) |
| 2023 | Cambuur | 13 | (3) |
| 2023 | FC Seoul | 9 | (1) |
| 2024–2025 | Torpedo Kutaisi | 68 | (44) |
| 2026 | Al Wehda | 17 | (6) |
| 2026– | Ordabasy | 17 | (14) |

International career
| 2017–2020 | Norway | 16 | (5) |
- * Club domestic league appearances and goals as of 13:54, 31 October 2026 (UTC)

Bjørn Maars Johnsen (born 6 November 1991) is a professional footballer who plays as a forward for Kazakhstan Premier League club Ordabasy. Born in the United States, he played for the Norway national team.

== Early life ==
Born in New York City and raised in North Carolina to a Norwegian father of African-American descent and an American mother, Johnsen grew up in North Carolina and attended Needham B. Broughton High School in Raleigh, where he played on the school's soccer team.

== Club career ==
=== Early career ===
Johnsen started his football career in Vålerenga and Tønsberg, staying there for two seasons. After leaving Tønsberg he went to Andalusia, to the CD Úbeda Viva, where he became the first foreigner in the history of the club. Johnsen spent close to three months with the club, where he played four games and scored a goal before signing fourth tier Spanish team Antequera in January 2012. Eight months later, on 5 August 2012, Johnsen joined Segunda División B side Atlético Baleares, where he played alongside Walter Pandiani.

=== Atlético CP ===
On 17 July 2014, Johnsen signed with Portuguese club Atlético CP on a two-year deal. In August, he won the award for Player of the Month in the Segunda Liga, after scoring nine goals in five games. His strong performances saw him being scouted by such teams as Benfica, Sporting CP and Belenenses, but the transfer never arrived. According to the Portuguese press Benfica offered €300,000 plus two of their players, but Atletico wanted €500,000 and thus rejected the offer.

=== Litex Lovech ===
After half a season, 31 matches and 16 goals with Atletico, Johnsen joined the Bulgarian team Litex Lovech for two and a half years. He made his debut on 28 February 2015 in a home win against Ludogorets Razgrad. On 23 May he scored a hat trick in a match against Ludogorets for a 4–2 win. On 12 December 2015, he was sent off after an altercation with Miguel Bedoya in an ill-tempered A PFG match against Levski Sofia that was eventually abandoned after the Litex players were ordered off the pitch.

=== Heart of Midlothian ===
On 22 July 2016, Johnsen completed a move to Scottish Premiership side Heart of Midlothian, on a three-year deal. He made his debut on 20 August 2016, appearing as a substitute in a 5–1 victory over Inverness Caledonian Thistle played at Tynecastle, where he assisted a Sam Nicholson goal with one of his first touches.

=== ADO Den Haag ===
Johnsen moved to ADO Den Haag for an undisclosed fee on 31 July 2017. In his first season he scored 19 goals in 34 official matches.

=== AZ Alkmaar ===
After a great season at ADO Den Haag, Johnsen transferred to AZ Alkmaar in 2018. His performance was substandard leading to a half-year loan spell at Rosenborg BK.

=== Ulsan Hyundai ===
On 6 January 2020, Johnsen signed a three-year contract with K League side Ulsan Hyundai.

=== CF Montreal ===
On 3 February 2021, Johnsen signed with MLS club CF Montreal.

=== FC Seoul ===
On 22 July 2023, Johnsen signed with K League team FC Seoul.

=== Torpedo Kutaisi ===
On 24 January 2024, Johnsen joined Georgian club Torpedo Kutaisi on a 1+1 deal. He opened his goalscoring account with a brace in a 4–1 win over Samtredia. From the outset Johnsen became a top goalscorer of both Torpedo and the Erovnuli Liga season, at one point scoring in seven consecutive matches. He netted against all nine teams and at the end claimed the Erovnuli Liga Forward of the Year award. Johnsen was also named in Team of the Season at an annual ceremony held by the Georgian Football Federation.

In 2025, Johnsen became the league goalscorer for the second time. Besides, he received the Forward of the Year and Player of the Year awards from the Erovnuli Liga.

=== Al Wehda ===
On 16 January 2026, Saudi First Division club Al Wehda announced the signing of Johnsen.

== International career ==
Due to his dual nationality, Johnsen was able to play for both Norway and the United States. Johnsen made his Norway debut in June 2017.

== Career statistics ==
=== Club ===
As of match played 7 November 2026

Appearances and goals by club, season and competition
| Club | Season | League | | | National cup (Note: Includes Copa del Rey, Bulgarian Cup, Scottish Cup, KNVB Cup, Korea Cup, Canadian Championship, Kazakhstan Cup) | | Continental | | Other | | Total | |
| Club | Season | Division | Apps | Goals | Apps | Goals | Apps | Goals | Apps | Goals | Apps | Goals |
|---|---|---|---|---|---|---|---|---|---|---|---|---|
| Tønsberg | 2011 | 2. divisjon | 10 | 3 | 0 | 0 | — | | — | | 10 | 3 |
| Antequera | 2011–12 | Tercera División | 13 | 3 | 0 | 0 | — | | — | | 13 | 3 |
| Atlético Baleares | 2012–13 | Segunda División B | 10 | 0 | 1 | 0 | — | | — | | 11 | 0 |
| Louletano | 2013–14 | Campeonato Nacional | 28 | 10 | 0 | 0 | — | | — | | 28 | 10 |
| Atlético CP | 2014–15 | LigaPro | 27 | 14 | 0 | 0 | — | | 4 (Note: Appearances in Taça da Liga) | 2 | 31 | 16 |
| Litex Lovech | 2014–15 | First League | 13 | 6 | 2 | 0 | — | | — | | 15 | 6 |
| Litex Lovech | 2015–16 | First League | 19 | 6 | 4 | 1 | 2 (Note: Appearance(s) in UEFA Europa League) | 2 | — | | 25 | 9 |
| Litex Lovech | Total | | 32 | 12 | 6 | 1 | 2 | 2 | – | | 40 | 15 |
| Hearts | 2016–17 | Scottish Premiership | 34 | 5 | 3 | 1 | — | | — | | 37 | 6 |
| ADO Den Haag | 2017–18 | Eredivisie | 34 | 19 | 1 | 0 | — | | — | | 35 | 19 |
| AZ | 2018–19 | Eredivisie | 22 | 6 | 3 | 1 | — | | — | | 25 | 7 |
| AZ | 2019–20 | Eredivisie | 0 | 0 | 0 | 0 | 1 | 0 | — | | 1 | 0 |
| AZ | Total | | 22 | 6 | 3 | 1 | 1 | 0 | — | | 26 | 7 |
| Rosenborg (loan) | 2019 | Eliteserien | 11 | 5 | 0 | 0 | 5 | 1 | — | | 16 | 6 |
| Ulsan Hyundai | 2020 | K League 1 | 18 | 5 | 4 | 1 | 9 (Note: Appearances in AFC Champions League) | 5 | — | | 31 | 11 |
| Montréal | 2021 | MLS | 26 | 2 | 2 | 0 | — | | — | | 28 | 2 |
| SC Cambuur | 2022–23 | Eredivisie | 13 | 3 | 0 | 0 | — | | — | | 13 | 3 |
| FC Seoul | 2023 | K League 1 | 9 | 1 | 0 | 0 | — | | — | | 9 | 1 |
| Torpedo Kutaisi | 2024 | Erovnuli Liga | 34 | 23 | 0 | 0 | 4 (Note: Appearances in UEFA Conference League) | 1 | 2 (Note: Appearances in Georgian Super Cup) | 2 | 40 | 26 |
| Torpedo Kutaisi | 2025 | Erovnuli Liga | 34 | 21 | 0 | 0 | 4 | 2 | — | | 38 | 23 |
| Torpedo Kutaisi | Total | | 68 | 44 | 0 | 0 | 8 | 3 | 2 | 2 | 78 | 49 |
| Al Wehda | 2025–26 | Saudi First Division League | 17 | 6 | 0 | 0 | — | | — | | 17 | 6 |
| Ordabasy | 2026 | Kazakhstan Premier League | 17 | 14 | 3 | 3 | — | | — | | 20 | 17 |
| Career total | | | 389 | 152 | 24 | 7 | 25 | 11 | 6 | 4 | 408 | 174 |

=== International ===
As of match played 15 October 2019

Appearances and goals by national team and year
| National team | Year | Apps | Goals |
|---|---|---|---|
| Norway | 2017 | 2 | 0 |
| Norway | 2018 | 8 | 2 |
| Norway | 2019 | 6 | 3 |
| Total | | 16 | 5 |

Scores and results list Norway's goal tally first, score column indicates score after each Johnsen goal.

List of international goals scored by Bjørn Maars Johnsen
| No. | Date | Venue | Opponent | Score | Result | Competition |
|---|---|---|---|---|---|---|
| 1 | 2 June 2018 | Laugardalsvöllur, Reykjavík, Iceland | Iceland | 1–0 | 3–2 | Friendly |
| 2 | 16 November 2018 | Stožice Stadium, Ljubljana, Slovenia | Slovenia | 1–1 | 1–1 | 2018–19 UEFA Nations League C |
| 3 | 26 March 2019 | Ullevaal Stadion, Oslo, Norway | Sweden | 1–0 | 3–3 | UEFA Euro 2020 qualification |
| 4 | 10 June 2019 | Tórsvøllur, Tórshavn, Faroe Islands | Faroe Islands | 1–0 | 2–0 | UEFA Euro 2020 qualification |
| 5 | 10 June 2019 | Tórsvøllur, Tórshavn, Faroe Islands | Faroe Islands | 2–0 | 2–0 | UEFA Euro 2020 qualification |

== Honours ==
Ulsan Hyundai

- AFC Champions League: 2020

Torpedo Kutaisi

- Georgian Super Cup: 2024

Ordabasy

- Kazakhstan Premier League: 2026
- Kazakhstan Cup: 2026

Individual

- SJPF Segunda Liga Player of the Month: August 2014, September 2014
- Scottish Premiership Player of the Month: November 2016
- Erovnuli Liga top goalscorer: 2024, 2025
- Erovnuli Liga Player of the Year: 2025
- Erovnuli Liga Forward of the Year: 2024, 2025
- Erovnuli Liga Team of the Year: 2024, 2025
