= Georgi Mikadze =

Russian-Georgian footballer

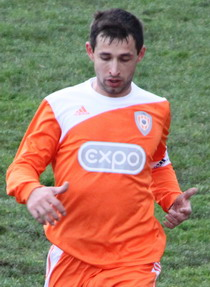

Personal information
- Full name: Georgi Gennadyevich Mikadze
- Date of birth: 3 October 1983 (age 43)
- Place of birth: Kutaisi, Georgian SSR
- Height: 1.84 m (6 ft 0 in)
- Position: Defender

Senior career*
Years	Team	Apps	(Gls)
2000	FC Krasnodar-2000 Krasnodar		
2001	FC Chernomorets Novorossiysk	0	(0)
2002–2004	FC Saturn-RenTV Ramenskoye	15	(0)
2004	FC Khimki	13	(0)
2005	FC Sochi-04	23	(3)
2006	FC Khimki	31	(0)
2007	FC Salyut-Energia Belgorod	38	(1)
2008	FC Baltika Kaliningrad	32	(1)
2009–2010	FC Zhemchuzhina Sochi	38	(1)
2010–2011	FC Mordovia Saransk	23	(1)
2012–2013	FC Salyut Belgorod	2	(0)
2014–2015	FC Afips Afipsky	24	(0)

International career
2002	Russia U-21	1	(0)
- * Club domestic league appearances and goals

Georgi Gennadyevich Mikadze (Russian: Георгий Геннадьевич Микадзе; born 3 October 1983) is a Russian former professional footballer. He also holds Georgian citizenship.

== Club career ==
He made his debut in the Russian Premier League in 2002 for FC Saturn-RenTV Ramenskoye.

== Honours ==
- Russian Cup finalist: 2005.
