= Giorgi Jgerenaia =

Georgian footballer

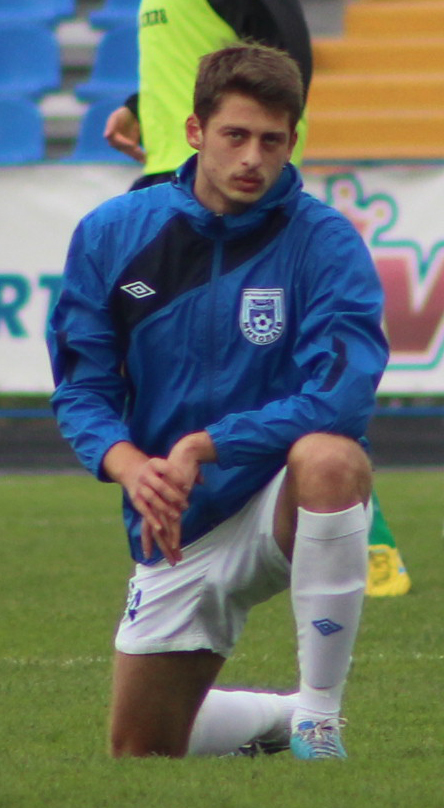
- Jgerenaia with Mykolaiv in 2013

Personal information
- Date of birth: 28 December 1993 (age 32)
- Place of birth: Tbilisi, Georgia
- Height: 1.86 m (6 ft 1 in)
- Position: Defender

Team information
- Current team: Navbahor Namangan
- Number: 34

Senior career*
Years	Team	Apps	(Gls)
2011–2013	Gagra	22	(1)
2013	→ Illichivets Mariupol (loan)	0	(0)
2013–2014	Mykolaiv	19	(0)
2014–2016	Gagra	25	(0)
2016	Dynamo-2 Kyiv	5	(0)
2016–2017	Gagra	33	(0)
2018	Norchi Dinamoeli	6	(0)
2018–2020	Samtredia	34	(0)
2021–2026	Iberia 1999	153	(6)
2026–	Navbahor Namangan	13	(1)

International career
2012	Georgia U19	4	(0)
2012	Georgia U21	1	(0)
- * Club domestic league appearances and goals as of 29 July 2026

Giorgi Jgerenaia (Georgian: გიორგი ჯგერენაია; born 28 December 1993) is a Georgian football player who plays for Uzbekistan Super League club Navbahor Namangan.

== Club career ==
He made his Ukrainian First League debut for Mykolaiv on 14 July 2013 in a game against Zirka Kirovohrad.
