= Luka Kutaladze =

Georgian footballer (born 2001)

Personal information
- Date of birth: 27 April 2001 (age 25)
- Place of birth: Tbilisi, Georgia
- Height: 1.90 m (6 ft 3 in)
- Position: Goalkeeper

Team information
- Current team: Samgurali

Youth career
- Merani Tbilisi
- Dinamo Tbilisi

Senior career*
Years	Team	Apps	(Gls)
2019–2023	Dinamo Tbilisi	24	(0)
2023–	Samgurali	24	(0)
2025	→ Gareji (loan)	20	(0)

International career
2019	Georgia U19	2	(0)
2021–2023	Georgia U21	6	(0)
- * Club domestic league appearances and goals as of 10 July 2026

Luka Kutaladze (Georgian: ლუკა კუტალაძე; born 27 April 2001) is a Georgian professional footballer who plays as a goalkeeper for Erovnuli Liga club Samgurali.

Kutaladze is the three-time Erovnuli Liga winner with Dinamo Tbilisi. He was named Goalkeeper of the Year in 2022.

== Career ==
=== Club ===
Kutaladze started playing football at Merani Tbilisi before joining Dinamo Tbilisi youth team. In 2019, he was promoted to the main team as a substitute for José Perales, although he did not make a debut for Dinamo until 11 April 2021 when they secured a 2–1 home win over Samredia.

The next year, Kutaladze was initially used as a second-choice goalkeeper after Andrés Prieto, but after the summer he made a significant progress. He took part in last 12 unbeaten league matches, keeping six clean sheets. As Dinamo claimed yet another champion's trophy, Kutaladze was hailed as one of its key players. Besides, Kutaladze saved all three after-match penalties in a Georgian Cup game against league champions Dinamo Batumi to help his team advance into the quarterfinals. At the end of this season, the 21-year-old player was named as Goalkeeper of the Year and included in Team of the Year.

After ten league games in goal in 2023, Dinamo loaned Kutaladze to Samgurali, replacing him with Giorgi Loria. In 2024, Kutaladze became a full squad member but due to insufficient playing time he opted to join newly promoted Erovnuli Liga club Gareji on loan. After making twenty league appearances, Kutaladze returned to Samgurali in early 2026.

=== International ===
Kutaladze was called up by coach Georgi Nemsadze to the U17 team first for a ten-day training session in February 2017. He was also a squad member during friendlies against Belarus in September 2017, followed by 2018 European Championship qualifiers a month later.

Kutaladze featured in two 2020 European U19 Championship qualifiers held in October 2019 in Hungary. Although the team progressed to the elite round after three convincing wins, the tournament was abruptly cancelled due to COVID-19.

Since Georgia was a co-host nation for 2023 UEFA European Under-21 Championship, their U21s did not have to go through a qualifying campaign, taking part in friendlies instead. Kutaladze made history by becoming Georgia's first goalkeeper in a major international U21 tournament. His performance in a 2–0 win over Portugal on 21 June 2023 was rated as second highest by some media outlets.

== Honours ==
=== Club ===
Dinamo Tbilisi

- Erovnuli Liga winner: 2019, 2020, 2022
- Supercup winner: 2023

Individual

- Erovnuli Liga Goalkeeper of the Year: 2022
- Erovnuli Liga Team of the Year: 2022
