= 2025 Erovnuli Liga =

Erovnuli Liga
- Season: 2025
- Dates: 28 February – 6 December 2025
- Champions: Iberia 1999 (3rd title)
- Relegated: Telavi; Gareji; Kolkheti 1913
- Champions League: Iberia 1999
- Conference League: Dila Gori; Torpedo Kutaisi; Dinamo Tbilisi
- Matches: 180
- Goals: 485 (2.69 per match)
- Top goalscorer: Bjørn Johnsen (21 goals)
- Biggest home win: Samgurali Tskaltubo 7–0 Telavi (19 April 2025)
- Biggest away win: Dila Gori 0–6 Iberia 1999 (17 August 2025)
- Highest scoring: Torpedo Kutaisi 6–2 Samgurali Tskaltubo (13 September 2025)
- Longest winning run: 7 matches Iberia 1999; Dila Gori
- Longest unbeaten run: 18 matches Iberia 1999
- Longest winless run: 13 matches Dinamo Batumi
- Longest losing run: 5 matches Dinamo Batumi; Samgurali Tskaltubo; Gareji
- Highest attendance: 10083; Torpedo Kutaisi 6–2 Samgurali Tskaltubo (13 September 2025)
- Lowest attendance: 100; 7 matches (Various)
- Average attendance: 1241 (Note: Data is approximate; attendance figures for 36 matches are not available.)

The 2025 Erovnuli Liga season or Crystalbet Erovnuli Liga 2025 (formerly known as Umaglesi Liga) is the 37th season of top tier football in Georgia. Iberia 1999 are the defending champions.

== Teams and stadiums ==
=== Changes ===
Gareji was promoted from the 2024 Erovnuli Liga 2 thus making a debut appearance in Erovnuli Liga. Samtredia has been relegated to 2025 Erovnuli Liga 2 after a two-year spell in top flight.

Locations of the 2025 Erovnuli Liga teams.

Team	Location	Venue	Capacity
Dila Gori	Gori	Tengiz Burjanadze Stadium	5,000
Dinamo Batumi	Batumi	Adjarabet Arena	20,000
Dinamo Tbilisi	Tbilisi	Boris Paichadze Stadium	54,549
Gagra	Tbilisi	David Petriashvili Stadium	2,130
Gareji	Sagarejo	Central stadium	2,000
Iberia 1999 (Note: Former FC Saburtalo)	Tbilisi	Mikheil Meskhi Stadium	22,754
Kolkheti-1913	Poti	GFF Technical Centre, Kobuleti	1,000
Samgurali Tskaltubo	Tsqaltubo	Football Centre	300
FC Telavi	Telavi	Caucasus Arena	1,000
Torpedo Kutaisi	Kutaisi	Ramaz Shengelia Stadium	19,400

=== Personnel and kits ===
Team	Head coach	Captain	Kit manufacturer	Shirt sponsor
Dila	(Italy) Diego Longo	(Georgia (country)) Nika Gagnidze	Nike	Marsbet
Dinamo Batumi	(Georgia (country)) Giorgi Chiabrishvili	(Georgia (country)) Mamuka Kobakhidze	Macron	Crocobet; Lixin Group
Dinamo Tbilisi	(Georgia (country)) Vladimer Kakashvili	(Georgia (country)) Aleksandre Kalandadze	Puma	adjarabet.com Marsbet
Gagra	(Serbia) Zeljko Ljubenovic	(Georgia (country)) Mate Vatsadze	Puma	N/A
Gareji	(Georgia (country)) Giorgi Mikadze	(Georgia (country)) Nikoloz Galakhvaridze	Nike	Communicom
Iberia 1999	(Georgia (country)) Guga Nergadze	(Georgia (country)) Gizo Mamageishvili	Givova	Audi
Kolkheti-1913	(Georgia (country)) Kakhaber Chkhetiani	(Georgia (country)) Giorgi Akhaladze	Macron	N/A
Samgurali	(Brazil) Thiago Gomes	(Georgia (country)) Demur Chikhladze	Hummel	Halyk Bank; Crocobet
Telavi	(Georgia (country)) Valeri Gagua	(Georgia (country)) Dachi Tsnobiladze	Jako	N/A
Torpedo Kutaisi	(Germany) Dirk Schuster	(Georgia (country)) Vladimer Mamuchashvili	Macron	New Vision University

=== Managerial changes ===
Team	Outgoing manager	Manner of departure	Position in table	Date of vacancy	Replaced by	Position in table	Date of appointment
Dinamo Tbilisi	(Austria) Ferdinand Feldhofer	Mutual consent	Pre-season	10 December 2024	(Georgia (country)) Vladimer Kakashvili	Pre-season	18 December 2024
Torpedo Kutaisi	(Scotland) Steve Kean	Mutual consent	Pre-season	21 December 2024	(Germany) Dirk Schuster	Pre-season	5 January 2025
Gareji	(Georgia (country)) Tengiz Kobiashvili	Mutual consent	10th	13 April 2025	(Georgia (country)) Giorgi Mikadze	10th	17 April 2025
Samgurali	(Italy) Rodolfo Vanoli	Mutual consent	6th	5 May 2025	(Brazil) Thiago Gomes	7th	9 May 2025
Iberia 1999	(Georgia (country)) Levan Korgalidze	Mutual consent	1st	31 July 2025	(Georgia (country)) Gia Geguchadze	1st	31 July 2025
Kolkheti-1913	(Georgia (country)) Kakhaber Chkhetiani	Mutual consent	10th	11 August 2025	(Georgia (country)) Davit Kvirkvelia	10th	11 August 2025
Iberia 1999	(Georgia (country)) Gia Geguchadze	Mutual consent	2nd	20 September 2025	(Georgia (country)) Guga Nergadze	2nd	2 October 2025
Gagra	(Georgia (country)) Giorgi Oniani	Mutual consent	6th	13 October 2025	(Serbia) Zeljko Ljubenovic	6th	16 October 2025

== League table ==
Pos	Team	Pld	W	D	L	GF	GA	GD	Pts	Qualification or relegation
1	Iberia 1999 (C)	36	24	8	4	60	24	+36	80	Qualification for Champions League first qualifying round
2	Dila Gori	36	25	3	8	63	35	+28	78	Qualification for Conference League first qualifying round (Note: The 2025 Georgian Cup winner was Dila Gori, so the third Conference League berth will go to the fourth place team.)
3	Torpedo Kutaisi	36	18	9	9	63	41	+22	63	Qualification for Conference League first qualifying round
4	Dinamo Tbilisi	36	15	12	9	51	34	+17	57	Qualification for Conference League first qualifying round
5	Gagra	36	12	7	17	44	55	−11	43 (Note: head-to-head points: Gagra-7, Dinamo Batumi-4)	
6	Dinamo Batumi	36	11	10	15	40	59	−19	43	
7	Samgurali Tskaltubo	36	12	6	18	54	53	+1	42	
8	Telavi (R)	36	9	9	18	36	59	−23	36	Qualification for Relegation play-offs
9	Gareji (R)	36	7	13	16	41	54	−13	34	Qualification for Relegation play-offs
10	Kolkheti-1913 (R)	36	5	7	24	33	71	−38	22	Relegation to Erovnuli Liga 2

Source: Erovnuli Liga, Soccerway
Rules for classification: 1) Points; 2) Head-to-head points; 3) Head-to-head goal difference; 4) Head-to-head goals scored; 5) Head-to-head away goals scored (only if two teams); 6) Goal difference; 7) Goals scored.
(C) Champions; (R) Relegated

== Results ==
Each team will play the other nine teams home and away twice, for a total of 36 games each.

=== Round 1–18 ===
Home \ Away	DIL	DBT	DTB	GAG	GAR	IBE	KOL	SMG	TEL	TKU
Dila Gori	—	1–1	2–1	2–0	2–1 (Note: Postponed due to weather conditions)	0–1	2–0	4–3	6–1	0–1
Dinamo Batumi	0–3	—	1–0 (Note: Postponed due to weather conditions)	2–1	1–1	2–3	2–0	2–0	2–0	1–0
Dinamo Tbilisi	2–1	1–1	—	1–1	1–0	1–2	3–0	2–1	2–1	2–0
Gagra	0–0	1–1	0–4	—	1–1	0–1	1–1	0–2	3–0	1–2
Gareji	0–1	0–0	1–2	0–1	—	1–1	4–1	2–1	0–0	1–1
Iberia 1999	1–0	1–1	1–0	3–1	2–1	—	4–0	2–1	2–0	2–0
Kolkheti-1913	1–2	0–2	0–0	0–2	0–1	2–2	—	2–1	1–0	2–2
Samgurali	0–1	3–0	0–0	0–2	3–1	0–0	0–1 (Note: Postponed due to weather conditions)	—	7–0	0–1
Telavi	2–3	1–2	1–1	0–1	1–0	0–0	1–0	1–3	—	1–3
Torpedo Kutaisi	1–2	1–0	2–0	2–1	0–2	0–1	2–1	1–1	1–2	—

Source: Erovnuli Liga Results, Soccerway
Legend: Blue = home team win; Yellow = draw; Red = away team win.

=== Round 19–36 ===
Home \ Away	DIL	DBT	DTB	GAG	GAR	IBE	KOL	SMG	TEL	TKU
Dila Gori	—	2–0	2–2	5–0	2–0	0–6	1–0	2–1	1–0	1–0
Dinamo Batumi	1–2	—	1–4	1–2	1–4	0–2	3–2	1–2	1–3	2–2
Dinamo Tbilisi	2–0	1–1	—	0–1	0–0	2–1	3–1	1–1	3–0	2–2
Gagra	0–1	4–1	4–2	—	4–1	1–3	1–3	2–0	1–2	0–2
Gareji	3–2	0–1	0–1	2–2	—	0–4	2–2	1–4	3–3	1–3
Iberia 1999	2–1	0–0	1–0	2–1	1–1	—	0–2	2–0	2–3	0–0
Kolkheti-1913	1–4	2–2	1–3	1–2	1–3	0–1	—	2–3	0–1	2–4
Samgurali	1–2	4–0	2–1	1–1	2–2	0–1	2–0	—	1–0	2–4
Telavi	0–2	1–2	0–0	4–0	0–0	0–2	1–1	3–0	—	2–2
Torpedo Kutaisi	0–1	5–1	1–1	2–1	2–1	3–1	4–0	6–2	1–1	—

Source: Erovnuli Liga Results, Erovnuli Liga Fixtures, Soccerway
Legend: Blue = home team win; Yellow = draw; Red = away team win.

== Relegation play-offs ==
10 December 2025
13:30

Meshakhte	1–1	Telavi
Timi 39'	Report	Devdariani 56'

Agrano Vachadze Stadium, Ambrolauri
Referee: Guram Machitidze
14 December 2025
18:00

Telavi	1–1 (a.e.t.)	Meshakhte
Martin 31' (pen.)	Report	Fobi 74'
Penalties
Tsnobiladze (penalty scored); Arabuli (penalty scored); Basheleishvili (penalty missed); Parkinashvili (penalty missed)	2–4	Ugrekhelidze (penalty scored); Khorkheli (penalty scored); Kurdadze (penalty scored); Ghurtskaia (penalty missed); Abuladze (penalty scored)

David Petriashvili Stadium, Tbilisi
Referee: Goga Kikacheishvili

Meshakhte won 2–2 (2–4 p) on aggregate.

10 December 2025
16:00

Gareji	0–2	Spaeri
	Report	Basilashvili 25'; Gegiadze 71'

Mikheil Meskhi 2 Stadium, Tbilisi
Referee: Jeneri Khorava
14 December 2025
19:00

Spaeri	1–2	Gareji
Basilashvili 28'	Report	Papava 53' (pen.), 63' (pen.)

Spaeri Stadium, Tbilisi
Referee: Giorgi Kruashvili

Spaeri won 3–2 on aggregate.

== Statistics ==
=== Top scorers ===
Rank	Player	Club	Goals
1	(Norway) Bjørn Johnsen	Torpedo Kutaisi	21
2	(Georgia national football team) Giorgi Pantsulaia	Samgurali	17
3	(Georgia national football team) Tornike Morchiladze	Dinamo Tbilisi	12
4	(Georgia national football team) Iuri Tabatadze	Iberia 1999	11
4	(Georgia national football team) Levan Papava	Gareji	11
6	(Georgia national football team) Shota Shekiladze	Dila Gori	10
7	(Georgia national football team) Aleksandre Andronikashvili	Dila Gori	8
7	(Georgia national football team) Giorgi Abuashvili	Kolkheti-1913	8
7	(Mali national football team) Aboubacar Konté	Dila Gori	8
10	(Spain national football team) Jalen Blesa	Dinamo Batumi	7
10	(Georgia national football team) Luka Khorkheli	Samgurali	7
10	(Georgia national football team) Giorgi Kharebashvili	Gagra	7
10	(Serbia national football team) Komnen Andrić	Torpedo Kutaisi	7
10	(Georgia national football team) Amiran Dzagania	Iberia 1999	7
10	(Georgia national football team) Davit Mujiri Jr	Gagra / Samgurali	7

=== Top assists ===
Rank	Player	Club	Assists
1	(Georgia national football team) Gizo Mamageishvili	Iberia 1999	8
2	(France national football team) Jean-Marc Tiboué	Dila Gori	7
2	(Georgia national football team) Vladimer Mamuchashvili	Torpedo Kutaisi	7
4	(Georgia national football team) Nikoloz Galakhvaridze	Gareji	6
4	(Ghana national football team) Cyril Edudzi	Dila Gori	6
4	(Georgia national football team) Luka Silagadze	Iberia 1999	6
7	(Georgia national football team) Shota Shekiladze	Dila Gori	5
7	(Georgia national football team) Luka Tsulukidze	Dinamo Batumi	5
7	(Georgia national football team) Luka Khorkheli	Samgurali	5
7	(Brazil national football team) Felipe Pires	Torpedo Kutaisi	5
7	(Georgia national football team) Aleko Basiladze	Torpedo Kutaisi	5

=== Hat-tricks ===
Player	For	Against	Result	Date	Ref.
(Georgia (country)) Shota Shekiladze	Dila Gori	Telavi	6–1 (H)	28 March 2025	
(Georgia (country)) Aleko Basiladze	Torpedo Kutaisi	Samgurali	6–2 (H)	13 September 2025	
(Norway) Bjørn Johnsen^{4}	Torpedo Kutaisi	Dinamo Batumi	5–1 (H)	8 November 2025	

- ^{4} Player scored Poker (4 goals)

=== Clean sheets ===
Rank	Player	Club	Clean sheets
1	(Georgia national football team) Giorgi Makaridze	Iberia 1999	19
2	(Georgia national football team) Davit Kereselidze	Dila	14
3	(Georgia national football team) Levan Tandilashvili	Telavi	8
4	(Serbia) Filip Kljajić	Torpedo Kutaisi	7
4	(Georgia national football team) Nodari Kalichava	Samgurali	7
6	(Georgia national football team) Luka Kharatishvili	Dinamo Batumi	6
6	(Belarus national football team) Roman Stepanov	Gagra	6
6	(Georgia national football team) Luka Kutaladze	Gareji	6
9	(Georgia national football team) Giorgi Loria	Dinamo Tbilisi	5
10	(Georgia national football team) Mikheil Makatsaria	Dinamo Tbilisi	3
10	(Ukraine) Yaroslav Kotlyarov	Kolkheti-1913	3
10	(Moldova national football team) Ștefan Sicaci	Dinamo Tbilisi	3
10	(Georgia national football team) Lazare Kupatadze	Dinamo Batumi	3

=== Discipline ===
==== Player ====
- Most yellow cards: 12
  - (Georgia (country)) Lado Odishvili (Telavi)
  - (Georgia (country)) Giorgi Gabadze (Gareji)
- Most red cards: 3
  - (Georgia (country)) Jaba Kankava (Dinamo Tbilisi)
  - (Georgia (country)) Tamaz Tsetskhladze (Gareji)

==== Club ====
- Most red cards: 13
  - Dinamo Tbilisi
- Most yellow cards: 90
  - Dinamo Tbilisi
