= Giorgi Kokhreidze =

Georgian professional footballer

Personal information
- Date of birth: 18 November 1998 (age 27)
- Place of birth: Zestaponi, Georgia
- Height: 1.70 m (5 ft 7 in)
- Position: Winger

Team information
- Current team: Torpedo
- Number: 10

Youth career
- 2011–2015: Saburtalo Tbilisi

Senior career*
Years	Team	Apps	(Gls)
2015–2021	Saburtalo Tbilisi	135	(28)
2021–2023	Grenoble	6	(0)
2023–2024	Iberia 1999	52	(17)
2025–	Torpedo	38	(4)

International career^{‡}
2014–2015	Georgia U17	4	(1)
2015–2016	Georgia U19	6	(2)
2017–2019	Georgia U21	13	(1)
- * Club domestic league appearances and goals as of 1 September 2026 ‡ National team caps and goals as of 17 October 2021

Giorgi Kokhreidze (Georgian: გიორგი კოხრეიძე; born 18 November 1998) is a Georgian professional footballer who plays as a winger for Torpedo Kutaisi.

He has won all three domestic competitions - the national cup, Erovnuli Liga and Supercup. Individually, after the 2024 season, he was named Player of the Year.

== Club career ==
Kokhreidze entered the Iberia football school at the age of six. When he turned 14, Kokhreidze joined Saburtalo academy. Initially, he played in the third team before gradually being promoted to the main team.

On 29 August 2015, Kokhreidze made his debut in the Umaglesi Liga after replacing Jaba Dvali in an away match against Dinamo Tbilisi. Three months later, he scored his first top-league goal which turned out a winner against Zugdidi.

The 2018 season was special both for the player and his club. As Saburtalo won the first league title in their history, Kokhreidze contributed with ten goals and four assists. The next summer, he made his appearance in European competitions, scoring in a 3–0 win over Moldovan side Sheriff.

On 8 December 2019, Kokheidze netted against Locomotive and helped his team clinch their first national cup, shortly followed by the Supercup in which Kokheidze converted from the spot against Dinamo Tbilisi.

In July 2021, Kokhreidze joined Grenoble in French Ligue 2. On 6 January 2023, his contract with Grenoble was terminated by mutual consent. In 2023, Kokheidze took part in all five matches of Saburtalo's cup campaign which resulted in their third title in four years.

In 2024, as Saburtalo turned into Iberia 1999 and won the league, Kokhreidze became the team topscorer with 16 goals. He received the Player of the Year award from the Football Federation and won nomination for Team of the Season as well.

In January 2025, Kokhreidze moved to Torpedo Kutaisi on a free transfer.

== Honours ==
Saburtalo / Iberia 1999

• Erovnuli Liga (2): 2018, 2024

• Georgian Cup (2): 2019, 2023

• Supercup (1): 2020

Individual

- Erovnuli Liga Player of the Year: 2024
