= Lazare Kupatadze =

Georgian footballer

Personal information
- Date of birth: 8 February 1996 (age 30)
- Place of birth: Tbilisi, Georgia
- Height: 1.97 m (6 ft 6 in)
- Position: Goalkeeper

Team information
- Current team: Dinamo Batumi
- Number: 1

Senior career*
| Years | Team | Apps | (Gls) |
| 2013–2019 | Saburtalo | 89 | (0) |
| 2015–2016 | → Locomotive (loan) | 12 | (0) |
| 2019 | Jeunesse Esch | 3 | (0) |
| 2019–2020 | Saburtalo | 27 | (0) |
| 2021–2022 | Dinamo Batumi | 51 | (0) |
| 2023–2024 | Saburtalo | 50 | (0) |
| 2024 | Liepāja | 2 | (0) |
| 2025– | Dinamo Batumi | 22 | (0) |

International career^{‡}
| 2016–2018 | Georgia U21 | 13 | (0) |
| 2021 | Georgia | 2 | (0) |
- * Club domestic league appearances and goals as of 12 July 2026 ‡ National team caps and goals as of 19:57, 17 May 2022 (UTC)

Lazare Kupatadze (Georgian: ლაზარე კუპატაძე; born 8 February 1996) is a Georgian footballer who plays as a goalkeeper for Erovnuli Liga club Dinamo Batumi and the Georgia national team.

== Career ==
Kupatadze made his international debut for Georgia on 2 June 2021, starting in a friendly match against Romania.

== Career statistics ==
=== International ===
As of 17 May 2022

Georgia
| Year | Apps | Goals |
|---|---|---|
| 2021 | 2 | 0 |
| Total | 2 | 0 |
