= FC Iberia 1999 =

Georgian football club

Iberia 1999
- Full name: Football Club Iberia 1999
- Nickname: Red Eagles
- Founded: 20 August 1999; 27 years ago (as Saburtalo)
- Ground: Mikheil Meskhi Stadium
- Capacity: 27,223
- Chairman: Tariel Khechikashvili
- Manager: (Georgia (country)) Levan Korgalidze (acting)
- League: Erovnuli Liga
- 2025: Erovnuli Liga, 1st of 10 (Champions)
- Website: fciberia1999.ge
Home colours	Away colours

FC Iberia 1999 (Georgian: იბერია 1999), formerly known as FC Saburtalo, is a Georgian football club, based in the Saburtalo District of Tbilisi, the capital of the country.

== History ==
Saburtalo was founded on 20 August 1999, in Tbilisi. In 2005, the club was bought by Iberia Business Group and its owner Tariel Khechikashvili, who later became the Minister of Sport & Youth Affairs of Georgia.

Following the 2014–15 season, Saburtalo won their respective Pirveli Liga group with a nineteen-point margin and advanced to the Umaglesi Liga.

In 2018, Saburtalo who had not won any silverware during the previous three seasons in the top-flight, claimed the champion's title for the first time under coach Gia Chiabrishvili.

A year later, they successfully completed their cup campaign after a 3–1 win over Locomotive in the final. In 2020, Saburtalo beat champions Dinamo Tbilisi to lift the Georgian Super Cup.

Next seasons saw the team winning two more cup trophies and two league titles with 2022 being the only year when Saburtalo failed to win any domestic tournament. The team won their second league title under coach Levan Korgalidze in 2024, followed by another triumph a year later.

Iberia 1999 were eliminated from the 2026–27 UEFA Champions League qualifying before reaching the Europa League play-off round, thereby securing a place in the Conference League league phase as the first Georgian club to compete in the competition.

== Statistics ==
=== By season ===
Season	League	Pos.	Pl.	W	D	L	GF	GA	P	Cup	Europe	Manager
as Saburalo
2013–14	Erovnuli Liga 2	8	26	9	5	12	38	34	32	DNP		Temur Shalamberidze
2014–15	Erovnuli Liga 2	1↑	36	28	3	5	92	25	82	First round		Giorgi Chiabrishvili
2015–16	Umaglesi Liga	8	30	11	6	13	47	61	39	First round		Giorgi Chiabrishvili
2016	Umaglesi Liga	3 (Note: Lost Bronze play-offs to Dinamo Tbilisi)	12	5	4	3	17	12	19	First round		Pablo Franco
2017	Erovnuli Liga	4	36	18	6	12	61	42	60	Fourth round		Giorgi Chiabrishvili
2018	Erovnuli Liga	1	36	24	7	5	64	29	79	Third round		Giorgi Chiabrishvili
2019	Erovnuli Liga	3	36	21	7	8	67	36	70	Winners	Champions League - 2QR; Europa League - 3QR	Giorgi Chiabrishvili
2020	Erovnuli Liga	5	18	7	6	5	28	21	27	Semi-final	Europa League - 1QR	Temur Shalamberidze; Levan Korgalidze
2021	Erovnuli Liga	4	36	15	8	13	52	40	57	Winners		Khvicha Shubitidze
2022	Erovnuli Liga	6	36	13	8	15	51	49	47	Semi-final	Conference League - 2QR	Lasha Nozadze
2023	Erovnuli Liga	6	36	14	9	13	58	49	51	Winners		Omari Tetradze; Giorgi Mikadze
as Iberia 1999
2024	Erovnuli Liga	1	36	23	6	7	74	46	75	Round of 16	Conference League - 3QR	Giorgi Mikadze; Levan Korgalidze
2025	Erovnuli Liga	1	36	24	8	4	60	24	80	Runners-up	Champions League - 1QR	Levan Korgalidze; Gia Geguchadze; Guga Nergadze
2026	Erovnuli Liga									Quarterfinals	Champions League - 2QR Conference League LP	Guga Nergadze; Andriy Demchenko; Levan Korgalidze

=== European record ===
Saburtalo made their debut in a UEFA competition in 2019 after being paired with Moldovan side Sheriff Tiraspol in the UEFA Champions League first qualifying round. They cruised to an away 3–0 victory, although survived an early scare in the return leg after conceding three goals within the opening ten minutes.

The team twice reached the third qualifying round of UEFA competitions before securing their first qualification for the league stage in 2026.

As of 7 November 2026

Season	Competition	Round	Club	Home	Away	Agg.
2019–20	UEFA Champions League	1QR	(Moldova) Sheriff Tiraspol	1–3	3–0	4−3
2019–20	UEFA Champions League	2QR	(Croatia) Dinamo Zagreb	0−2	0−3	0−5
2019–20	UEFA Europa League	3QR	Ararat-Armenia	0−2	2−1	2−3
2020–21	UEFA Europa League	1QR	(Cyprus) Apollon Limassol	—N/a	1–5	—N/a
2022–23	UEFA Europa Conference League	1QR	(Albania) Partizani	0–1	1–0 (a.e.t.)	1−1 (5–4 p)
2022–23	UEFA Europa Conference League	2QR	(Romania) FCSB	1–0	2–4	3–4
2024–25	UEFA Europa Conference League	2QR	(Albania) Partizani	2–0	0–0	2–0
2024–25	UEFA Europa Conference League	3QR	(Turkey) İstanbul Başakşehir	0–1	0–2	0–3
2025–26	UEFA Champions League	1QR	(Sweden) Malmö FF	1–3	1–3	2−6
2025–26	UEFA Europa Conference League	2QR	(Estonia) FCI Levadia	2–2 (a.e.t.)	0–1	2–3
2026–27	UEFA Champions League	1QR	(Estonia) Flora	2–2	3–2	5−4
2026–27	UEFA Champions League	2QR	(Slovakia) Slovan Bratislava	0–2	1–1	1−3
2026–27	UEFA Europa League	3QR	(Northern Ireland) Larne	2–1 (a.e.t.)	0–0	2–1
2026–27	UEFA Europa League	PO	(Poland) Jagiellonia Białystok	1–2	0–4	1–6
2026–27	UEFA Conference League	LP	(Belgium) Sint-Truiden	—N/a	0–2	
2026–27	UEFA Conference League	LP	(Sweden) Mjällby AIF	1–1	—N/a	
2026–27	UEFA Conference League	LP	(Denmark) Copenhagen	—N/a	1–2	
2026–27	UEFA Conference League	LP	(Spain) Getafe		—N/a	
2026–27	UEFA Conference League	LP	(Serbia) Red Star Belgrade		—N/a	
2026–27	UEFA Conference League	LP	(Czech Republic) Jablonec	—N/a		

Notes

- QR: Qualifying round

=== Overall record ===
As of 7 November 2026

Competition	Played	Won	Drew	Lost	GF	GA	GD	Win%
UEFA Champions League	10	2	2	6	14	21	−7	20.00
UEFA Europa League	5	2	1	2	5	9	−4	40.00
UEFA Conference League	14	3	2	9	10	21	−11	21.43
Total	29	7	5	17	26	48	−22	24.14

Legend: GF = Goals For. GA = Goals Against. GD = Goal Difference.

== Players ==
As of 14 September 2026

Note: Flags indicate national team as defined under FIFA eligibility rules; some limited exceptions apply. Players may hold more than one non-FIFA nationality.

No.	Pos.	Nation	Player
1	GK	GEO	Tornike Megrelishvili
3	DF	CRO	Phillip Čančar
4	DF	LUX	Vahid Selimović
5	DF	GEO	Giorgi Jinjolava (captain)
6	MF	GEO	Nikoloz Dadiani
7	FW	GEO	Daniel Kvartskhava
8	MF	GEO	Bakar Kardava
9	FW	GEO	Amiran Dzagania
10	FW	GEO	Zviad Natchkebia
11	MF	GEO	Andria Bartishvili (on loan from Kolkheti)
14	MF	NGR	Ibrahim Alhassan
15	DF	GEO	Luka Mamulashvili
16	GK	GEO	Revaz Kurtanidze
17	FW	NGR	Stephen Ende (on loan from Sabah)
18	MF	BRA	Lucas Café
19	FW	GEO	Nika Sikharulashvili

No.	Pos.	Nation	Player
20	FW	GEO	Saba Marsagishvili
22	DF	URU	Sebastián Figueredo (on loan from Leganés)
23	MF	UKR	Eldar Kuliyev
24	FW	GEO	Vakho Bedoshvili (on loan from Pari Nizhny Novgorod)
25	DF	GEO	Aleksandre Amisulashvili
26	FW	GEO	Giorgi Beridze
27	MF	GEO	Giorgi Kutsia (on loan from Veres Rivne)
29	FW	GEO	Lado Chikhradze
30	DF	GEO	Nikoloz Bochorishvili
31	GK	GEO	Giorgi Makaridze
32	FW	GEO	Davit Gogilashvili
33	DF	FRA	Jean-Marc Tiboue
35	MF	GEO	Saba Avdoevi
39	DF	GEO	Giorgi Chanturia
40	DF	GEO	Giorgi Kobuladze

=== Out on loan ===
Note: Flags indicate national team as defined under FIFA eligibility rules; some limited exceptions apply. Players may hold more than one non-FIFA nationality.

No.	Pos.	Nation	Player

== Top goalscorers ==
Season	Div.	Player	G
2013–14	2nd	(Liberia) Laurenzo Larky	5
2014–15	2nd	(Georgia (country)) Guram Goshteliani	26
2015–16	1st	(Georgia (country)) Giorgi Kharaishvili	12
2016	1st	(Georgia (country)) Giorgi Kharaishvili	5
2017	1st	(Georgia (country)) Giorgi Kharaishvili	13
2018	1st	(Brazil) Vagner Gonsalves	20
2019	1st	(Georgia (country)) Giorgi Diasamidze	11
2020	1st	(Georgia (country)) Beka Kavtaradze	11
2021	1st	(Georgia (country)) Iuri Tabatadze (Moldova) Dmitri Mandrîcenco	11
2022	1st	(Georgia (country)) Irakli Sikharulidze	12
2023	1st	(Mali) Cheikne Sylla	12
2024	1st	(Georgia (country)) Giorgi Kokhreidze	16
2025	1st	(Georgia (country)) Iuri Tabatadze	11

== Honours ==
Team honours:
Type	Competition	Titles	Seasons
Domestic	Erovnuli Liga	3	2018, 2024, 2025
Domestic	Erovnuli Liga 2	1	2014–15
Domestic	Georgian Cup	3	2019, 2021, 2023
Domestic	Georgian Super Cup	1	2020

== Notable players ==
This is the list of footballers who have played for the team and had international caps for their respective countries.

Georgia

- (Georgia (country)) Sandro Altunashvili
- (Georgia (country)) Bachana Arabuli
- (Georgia (country)) Giorgi Beridze
- (Georgia (country)) Grigol Chabradze
- (Georgia (country)) Vladimir Dvalishvili
- (Georgia (country)) Iva Gelashvili
- (Georgia (country)) Giorgi Gocholeishvili
- (Georgia (country)) Tornike Gorgiashvili
- (Georgia (country)) Levan Kakubava
- (Georgia (country)) Levan Kenia
- (Georgia (country)) Giorgi Kharaishvili
- (Georgia (country)) Giorgi Kochorashvili
- (Georgia (country)) Lazare Kupatadze
- (Georgia (country)) Giorgi Makaridze
- (Georgia (country)) Nikoloz Mali
- (Georgia (country)) Vladimer Mamuchashvili
- (Georgia (country)) Zurab Menteshashvili
- (Georgia (country)) Omar Migineishvili
- (Georgia (country)) Shota Nonikashvili
- (Georgia (country)) Lasha Parunashvili
- (Georgia (country)) Giorgi Rekhviashvili
- (Georgia (country)) Irakli Sikharulidze
- (Georgia (country)) Davit Skhirtladze
- (Georgia (country)) David Targamadze
- (Georgia (country)) Dimitri Tatanashvili
- (Georgia (country)) Davit Volkovi

Europe

- (Luxembourg) Vahid Selimović
- (Moldova) Dmitri Mandrîcenco
- (Moldova) Victor Mudrac

Africa

- (Cameroon) Olivier Boumal
- (Kenya) Alwyn Tera
- (São Tomé and Príncipe) Jardel Nazaré
- (Zimbabwe) Alec Mudimu

South America

- (Suriname) Dhoraso Klas

== Other teams ==
The reserve team currently competes in the 3rd division after a one-year tenure in Erovnuli Liga 2 in 2025.

The U19s won their youth league in 2016 and 2022, while the U17 team secured three titles in the early 2020s.

The club has one of the top football academies in the country. Their youth teams play at the Bendela stadium named after young footballer Zaza Bendeliani who as an Abkhazia war hero was posthumously granted the Vakhtang Gorgasali Order in 1993.

== Name ==
Saburtalo is the name of one of Tbilisi's districts where the team academy and stadium Bendela are located, while the term Iberia 1999 refers to the Latin name Iberia given to the Kingdom of Kartli which existed in Georgia in the period of Classical Antiquity; it has no connection to the Iberian Peninsula (Spain, Portugal, Andorra, Gibraltar).

On 27 February 2024, the team's name was changed to Iberia 1999.

== Stadium ==
The club uses the Mikheil Meskhi Stadium in Tbilisi for their home matches.
