= 2024 Erovnuli Liga =

Erovnuli Liga
- Season: 2024
- Dates: 1 March – 8 December 2024
- Champions: Iberia 1999 (2nd title)
- Relegated: Samtredia
- Champions League: Iberia 1999
- Conference League: Dila Gori; Torpedo Kutaisi
- Matches: 180
- Goals: 465 (2.58 per match)
- Top goalscorer: Bjørn Johnsen (23 goals)
- All statistics correct as of 16 December 2024.

The 2024 Erovnuli Liga season or Crystalbet Erovnuli Liga 2024 (formerly known as Umaglesi Liga) was the 36th season of top tier football in Georgia. Dinamo Batumi were the defending champions. The season began on March the 1st and ended on December the 8th. The league was won by Iberia 1999. This was second time they won the league, with first being in 2018.

== Teams and stadiums ==
=== Changes ===
Kolkheti-1913 was promoted from the 2023 Erovnuli Liga 2 thus returning to top tier after a five year absence. Shukura Kobuleti has been relegated to 2024 Liga 4 due to failing licensing process, thus being relegated after a single season in top flight.

Locations of the 2024 Erovnuli Liga teams.

Team	Location	Venue	Capacity
Dila Gori	Gori	Tengiz Burjanadze Stadium	5,000
Dinamo Batumi	Batumi	Adjarabet Arena	20,000
Dinamo Tbilisi	Tbilisi	Boris Paichadze Stadium	54,549
Gagra	Tbilisi	Ilia Kokaia Football Center	500
Iberia 1999 (Note: Former FC Saburtalo)	Tbilisi	David Petriashvili Stadium	2,130
Kolkheti-1913	Poti	GFF Technical Centre, Kobuleti	1,000
Samgurali Tsqaltubo	Tsqaltubo	26 May Stadium; Football Centre	3,500; 300
FC Samtredia	Samtredia	Erosi Manjgaladze Stadium	3,000
FC Telavi	Telavi	Caucasus Arena	1,000
Torpedo Kutaisi	Kutaisi	Ramaz Shengelia Stadium	19,400

=== Personnel and kits ===
Team	Head coach	Captain	Kit manufacturer	Shirt sponsor
Dila	(Portugal) Ricardo Costa	(Georgia (country)) Nika Gagnidze	Nike	Marsbet
Dinamo Batumi	(Georgia (country)) Giorgi Chiabrishvili	(Georgia (country)) Mamuka Kobakhidze	Macron	Crocobet; Lixin Group
Dinamo Tbilisi	(Austria) Ferdinand Feldhofer	(Georgia (country)) Aleksandre Kalandadze	Puma	adjarabet.com Marsbet
Gagra	(Georgia (country)) Giorgi Oniani	(Georgia (country)) Mate Vatsadze	Puma	N/A
Iberia 1999	(Georgia (country)) Levan Korgalidze	(Georgia (country)) Lazare Kupatadze	Givova	Audi
Kolkheti-1913	(Georgia (country)) Kakhaber Chkhetiani	(Georgia (country)) Davit Megrelishvili	Macron	N/A
Samgurali	(Italy) Rodolfo Vanoli	(Georgia (country)) Tedo Kikabidze	Hummel	Halyk Bank; Crocobet
Samtredia	(Georgia (country)) Vladimer Kakashvili	(Georgia (country)) Davit Ubilava	Kelme	N/A
Telavi	(Cyprus) Pambos Christodoulou	(Georgia (country)) Dachi Tsnobiladze	Jako	N/A
Torpedo	(Scotland) Steve Kean	(Georgia (country)) Merab Gigauri	Macron	New Vision University

=== Managerial changes ===
Team	Outgoing manager	Manner of departure	Position in table	Date of vacancy	Replaced by	Position in table	Date of appointment
Dinamo Tbilisi	(Spain) Andrés Carrasco	Mutual consent	5th	7 June 2024	(Austria) Ferdinand Feldhofer	5th	16 June 2024
Dila Gori	(Portugal) Rui Mota	Signed by FC Noah	1st	14 June 2024	(Portugal) Ricardo Costa	1st	8 July 2024
Iberia 1999	(Georgia (country)) Giorgi Mikadze	Fired	3rd	5 July 2024	(Georgia (country)) Levan Korgalidze	3rd	5 July 2024
Samtredia	(North Macedonia) Dimitar Kapinkovski	Mutual consent	10th	21 August 2024	(Georgia (country)) Vladimer Kakashvili	10th	24 August 2024
Telavi	(Armenia) Armen Adamyan	Fired	8th	3 September 2024	(Cyprus) Pambos Christodoulou	8th	3 September 2024
Samgurali	(Georgia (country)) Mikheil Ashvetia	Mutual consent	6th	9 October 2024	(Italy) Rodolfo Vanoli	6th	11 October 2024
Dinamo Batumi	(Ukraine) Andriy Demchenko	Fired	4th	9 October 2024	(Georgia (country)) Giorgi Chiabrishvili	4th	18 October 2024

== League table ==
Pos	Team	Pld	W	D	L	GF	GA	GD	Pts	Qualification or relegation
1	Iberia 1999 (C)	36	23	6	7	74	46	+28	75	Qualification for the Champions League first qualifying round
2	Torpedo Kutaisi	36	21	7	8	58	40	+18	70	Qualification for the Conference League first qualifying round
3	Dila Gori	36	19	11	6	58	30	+28	68	Qualification for the Conference League first qualifying round
4	Dinamo Batumi	36	15	10	11	42	41	+1	55	
5	Samgurali Tsqaltubo	36	11	11	14	51	49	+2	44	
6	Kolkheti-1913	36	9	14	13	48	58	−10	41	
7	Dinamo Tbilisi	36	9	12	15	33	44	−11	39	
8	Gagra (O)	36	11	5	20	36	53	−17	38	Qualification to Relegation play-offs
9	Telavi (O)	36	8	10	18	32	43	−11	34	Qualification to Relegation play-offs
10	Samtredia (R)	36	5	12	19	33	61	−28	27	Relegation to Erovnuli Liga 2

Source: Erovnuli Liga, Soccerway
Rules for classification: 1) Points; 2) Head-to-head points; 3) Head-to-head goal difference; 4) Head-to-head goals scored; 5) Head-to-head away goals scored (only if two teams); 6) Goal difference; 7) Goals scored.
(C) Champions; (O) Play-off winners; (R) Relegated

== Results ==
Each team will play the other nine teams home and away twice, for a total of 36 games each.

=== Round 1–18 ===
Home \ Away	DIL	DBT	DTB	GAG	IBE	KOL	SMG	SAM	TEL	TKU
Dila Gori	—	0–0	2–1	2–0	3–1	1–1	1–1	3–0	1–0	1–1
Dinamo Batumi	0–2	—	2–0	0–1	2–3	1–0	1–0	3–1	1–1	3–2
Dinamo Tbilisi	2–2	1–2	—	2–0	1–0	0–0	2–0	1–1	0–0	1–0
Gagra	0–1	1–3	0–2	—	4–0	2–0	0–0	2–1	2–0	0–1
Iberia 1999	1–4	3–0	1–0	3–1	—	0–2	1–2	2–2	1–0	3–3
Kolkheti-1913	1–3	2–2	2–2	2–1	1–2	—	3–3	2–0	3–1	2–5
Samgurali	0–1	0–1	3–1	2–0	2–3	1–1	—	4–0	2–1	1–3
Samtredia	0–0	2–2	0–0	1–3	0–3	1–1	2–0	—	1–2	0–0
Telavi	0–1	0–1	4–0	1–0	0–3	1–1	2–1	0–0	—	0–0
Torpedo Kutaisi	1–0	1–0	0–0	2–1	2–3	3–2	3–1	4–1	1–0	—

Source: Erovnuli Liga Results, Soccerway
Legend: Blue = home team win; Yellow = draw; Red = away team win.

=== Round 19–36 ===
Home \ Away	DIL	DBT	DTB	GAG	IBE	KOL	SMG	SAM	TEL	TKU
Dila Gori	—	1–2	1–0	0–0	1–3	1–2	2–1	3–2	1–1	1–1
Dinamo Batumi	0–2	—	1–1	3–2	0–1	0–0	0–0	1–2	1–0	1–1
Dinamo Tbilisi	1–1	1–2	—	0–1	0–2	3–2	0–1	1–1	5–1	1–2
Gagra	0–5	1–1	0–0	—	1–2	3–1	1–3	2–1	2–0	0–3
Iberia 1999	3–2	3–0	3–0	1–1	—	1–1	1–1	3–1	1–1	3–0
Kolkheti-1913	2–2	0–1	3–0	2–1	2–6	—	1–1	0–0	0–0	3–1
Samgurali	0–1	3–3	1–2	4–2	3–4	3–0	—	1–0	2–2	2–1
Samtredia	0–1	0–1	1–1	2–0	0–1	1–3	2–2	—	2–1	2–1
Telavi	1–0	2–1	0–1	0–1	1–2	3–0	0–0	5–2	—	1–2
Torpedo Kutaisi	1–5	1–0	2–0	2–0	2–1 (Note: Postponed)	2–0	1–0	2–1	1–0	—

Source: Erovnuli Liga Results, Erovnuli Liga Fixtures, Soccerway
Legend: Blue = home team win; Yellow = draw; Red = away team win.

== Relegation play-offs ==
12 December 2024
13:00

Sioni Bolnisi	1–1	Gagra
Makatsaria 44'		Tchamba 83'

Tamaz Stepania Stadium, Bolnisi
Referee: Irakli Kvirikashvili
16 December 2024
18:00

Gagra	2–2 (a.e.t.)	Sioni Bolnisi
Kimadze 52'; Nozadze 104' (o.g.)		Rekhviashvili 45+2'; Tsirdava 94'
Penalties
Gabiskiria (penalty scored); Augusto (penalty scored); Kharebashvili (penalty missed); Nadareishvili (penalty scored); Lomtadze (penalty scored); Tchavtchanidze (penalty scored); Ubilava (penalty scored); Tchamba (penalty scored)	7–6	Sitchinava (penalty scored); Tsirdava (penalty scored); Potskhveria (penalty missed); Ugrekhelidze (penalty scored); Khabelashvili (penalty scored); Rekhviashvili (penalty scored); Shonia (penalty scored); Kapanadze (penalty missed)

David Petriashvili Stadium, Tbilisi
Referee: Giorgi Kruashvili

12 December 2024
13:00

Telavi	2–1	Rustavi
Tsnobiladze 45+6'; Georgijević 60'		Kilasonia 83'

Caucasus Arena, Telavi
Referee: Giorgi Kikacheishvili
16 December 2024
15:00

Rustavi	1–1 (a.e.t.)	Telavi
Nakano 12'		Zhividze 116'

GFF Technical Centre, Rustavi
Referee: Aleko Aptsiauri

== Statistics ==
=== Top scorers ===
As of match played 8 December 2024

Rank	Player	Club	Goals
1	(Norway) Bjørn Johnsen	Torpedo Kutaisi	23
2	(Netherlands) Tayrell Wouter	Dila Gori	19
3	(Georgia (country)) Giorgi Kokhreidze	Iberia 1999	16
4	(Mali) Cheikne Sylla	Iberia 1999	14
5	(Georgia (country)) Giorgi Kharebashvili	Gagra	11
5	(Georgia (country)) Luka Khorkheli	Samgurali	11
7	(Georgia (country)) Levan Kutalia	Dinamo Batumi / Samgurali	10
7	(Russia) Kirill Klimov	Kolkheti-1913	10
9	(Georgia (country)) Shota Shekiladze	Dila Gori	9
9	(Georgia (country)) Giorgi Abuashvili	Kolkheti-1913	9

=== Hat-tricks ===
Player	For	Against	Result	Date	Ref.
(Georgia (country)) Luka Khorkheli	Samgurali Tsqaltubo	Kolkheti-1913	3–0 (H)	24 August 2024	
(Georgia (country)) Giorgi Kokhreidze^{4}	Iberia 1999	Kolkheti-1913	6–2 (A)	22 September 2024	
(Georgia (country)) Levan Kutalia	Samgurali Tsqaltubo	Gagra	6–2 (H)	10 November 2024	

- ^{4} Player scored Poker (4 goals)

=== Clean sheets ===
As of match played 8 December 2024

Rank	Player	Club	Clean sheets
1	(Georgia (country)) Davit Kereselidze	Dila Gori	15
2	(Serbia) Filip Kljajić	Torpedo Kutaisi	10
3	(Ukraine) Oleksandr Vorobey	Gagra	9
4	(Georgia (country)) Giorgi Loria	Dinamo Tbilisi	7
4	(Georgia (country)) Nodar Kalichava	Samgurali Tsqaltubo	7
4	(Ukraine) Yaroslav Kotlyarov	Kolkheti-1913	7
7	(Georgia (country)) Giorgi Makaridze	Iberia 1999	6
8	(Georgia (country)) Lazare Kupatadze	Iberia 1999	5
8	(Georgia (country)) Tornike Megrelishvili	Samtredia	5
8	(Georgia (country)) Levan Tandilashvili	Telavi	5
