= 2018 Erovnuli Liga =

Erovnuli Liga
- Season: 2018
- Dates: 2 March 2018 – 8 December 2018
- Champions: Saburtalo Tbilisi; 1st Georgian title
- Relegated: Samtredia; Kolkheti Poti
- Champions League: Saburtalo Tbilisi
- Europa League: Dinamo Tbilisi; Torpedo Kutaisi; Chikhura Sachkhere
- Matches: 180
- Goals: 486 (2.7 per match)

The 2018 Erovnuli Liga (formerly known as Umaglesi Liga) was the 30th season of top-tier football in Georgia. Torpedo Kutaisi were the defending champions. The season began on 2 March 2018 and finished on 8 December 2018.

== Teams and stadiums ==
Locations of the 2018 Erovnuli Liga teams.

Team	Location	Venue	Capacity
Chikhura Sachkhere	Kutaisi	Ramaz Shengelia Stadium	19,400
Dila Gori	Gori	Tengiz Burjanadze Stadium	5,000
Dinamo Tbilisi	Tbilisi	Boris Paichadze Stadium	54,549
Kolkheti Poti	Kobuleti	Chele Arena	6,000
Locomotive Tbilisi	Tbilisi	Mikheil Meskhi Stadium	27,223
FC Rustavi	Rustavi	Poladi Stadium	10,720
Saburtalo Tbilisi	Tbilisi	Mikheil Meskhi Stadium	27,223
FC Samtredia	Samtredia	Erosi Manjgaladze Stadium	5,000
Sioni Bolnisi	Bolnisi	Tamaz Stepania Stadium	3,242
Torpedo Kutaisi	Kutaisi	Ramaz Shengelia Stadium	19,400

== League table ==
Pos	Team	Pld	W	D	L	GF	GA	GD	Pts	Qualification or relegation
1	Saburtalo Tbilisi (C)	36	24	7	5	64	29	+35	79	Qualification for the Champions League first qualifying round
2	Dinamo Tbilisi	36	21	6	9	73	38	+35	69	Qualification for the Europa League first qualifying round (Note: Since the winners of 2018 Georgian Cup, Torpedo Kutaisi, qualified for European competition based on their league position, the spot awarded to the Cup winner (Europa League first qualifying round) was passed to the next best-placed team (the fourth-placed team).)
3	Torpedo Kutaisi	36	20	9	7	66	25	+41	69	Qualification for the Europa League first qualifying round
4	Chikhura Sachkhere	36	19	7	10	54	33	+21	64	Qualification for the Europa League first qualifying round
5	Dila Gori	36	17	12	7	60	40	+20	63	
6	Locomotive Tbilisi	36	12	8	16	43	55	−12	44	
7	Rustavi	36	8	13	15	33	44	−11	37	
8	Sioni Bolnisi (O)	36	8	7	21	39	65	−26	31	Qualification to Relegation play-offs
9	Samtredia (R)	36	4	9	23	28	81	−53	21	Qualification to Relegation play-offs
10	Kolkheti Poti (Note: Kolkheti Poti were deducted 6 points.) (R)	36	4	8	24	26	76	−50	14	Relegation to Erovnuli Liga 2

Source: Erovnuli Liga (in Georgian), Soccerway
Rules for classification: 1) Points; 2) Head-to-head points; 3) Head-to-head goal difference; 4) Head-to-head goals scored; 5) Head-to-head away goals scored (only if two teams); 6) Goal difference; 7) Goals scored.
(C) Champions; (O) Play-off winners; (R) Relegated

== Results ==
Each team will play the other nine teams home and away twice, for a total of 36 games each.

=== First half of season ===
Home \ Away	CHI	DIL	DTB	KOL	LOC	RUS	SAB	SAM	SIO	TKU
Chikhura Sachkhere	—	0–3	1–2	6–1	1–3	1–0	2–1	0–0	4–0	1–0
Dila Gori	1–1	—	1–1	2–0	3–2	2–2	4–1	3–0	3–2	1–1
Dinamo Tbilisi	1–0	5–0	—	4–1	0–1	1–2	0–1	3–1	2–1	2–0
Kolkheti Poti	2–2	0–3	3–6	—	3–1	0–0	1–4	2–2	2–0	1–1
Locomotive Tbilisi	1–1	1–3	1–4	2–1	—	1–1	1–1	1–2	1–2	1–0
Rustavi	0–4	2–2	0–2	2–0	1–0	—	0–2	2–1	2–2	0–1
Saburtalo Tbilisi	1–0	2–0	1–0	5–0	1–2	2–1	—	1–0	3–1	2–0
Samtredia	0–1	0–0	1–2	0–2	1–1	0–0	1–3	—	0–1	1–4
Sioni Bolnisi	0–2	2–2	1–2	0–0	1–0	0–2	0–2	1–1	—	1–2
Torpedo Kutaisi	0–1	2–3	1–1	3–0	4–0	2–1	1–2	1–0	3–0	—

Source: Erovnuli Liga
Legend: Blue = home team win; Yellow = draw; Red = away team win.

=== Second half of season ===
Home \ Away	CHI	DIL	DTB	KOL	LOC	RUS	SAB	SAM	SIO	TKU
Chikhura Sachkhere	—	2–1	1–2	3–1	0–0	0–0	0–1	2–0	2–1	0–2
Dila Gori	1–3	—	1–0	1–0	4–0	2–0	0–0	3–0	0–0	0–0
Dinamo Tbilisi	1–4	1–2	—	2–1	0–0	2–1	2–1	0–0	5–2	0–1
Kolkheti Poti	0–1	0–2	0–2	—	1–0	0–1	1–3	0–1	1–1	0–0
Locomotive Tbilisi	3–2	2–1	2–4	5–1	—	1–0	1–1	3–2	1–0	0–1
Rustavi	1–2	0–0	0–3	0–0	1–1	—	0–2	3–0	0–3	0–0
Saburtalo Tbilisi	0–0	0–0	2–1	4–1	2–1	2–1	—	1–1	3–0	0–3
Samtredia	1–2	3–5	1–8	1–0	1–0	1–1	1–4	—	0–4	0–8
Sioni Bolnisi	1–2	3–1	0–0	2–0	1–2	0–4	2–3	4–2	—	0–3
Torpedo Kutaisi	1–0	2–0	2–2	4–0	3–1	2–2	0–0	5–2	3–0	—

Source: Erovnuli Liga
Legend: Blue = home team win; Yellow = draw; Red = away team win.

== Relegation play-offs ==
12 December 2018
12:00 UTC+4

Gagra	0–1	Sioni Bolnisi
	Report	Isiani 64'

Tengiz Burjanadze Stadium, Gori
Attendance: 700
Referee: Irakli Kvirikashvili
15 December 2018
10:00 UTC+4

Sioni Bolnisi	3-0	Gagra
Isiani 28'; Khmaladze 51'; Kirkitadze 73'	Report

Tamaz Stepania Stadium, Bolnisi
Attendance: 1,200
Referee: Davit Kharitonashvili

Both teams remained in their leagues respectively.

12 December 2018
14:00 UTC+4

Samtredia	2–2	WIT Georgia
Pantsulaia 22', 90+2'	Report	Maisuradze 58'; Getiashvili 69'

Ramaz Shengelia Stadium, Kutaisi
Attendance: 500
Referee: Giorgi Vaduchkoria
15 December 2018
10:00 UTC+4

WIT Georgia	4-0	Samtredia
Ghirdaladze 5'; Maisuradze 13'; Sajaia 61'; Vazagashvili 63'	Report

Mtskheta Park, Mtskheta
Attendance: 500
Referee: Giorgi Kruashvili

WIT Georgia are promoted to 2019 Erovnuli Liga.

== Top goalscorers ==
As of match played 8 December 2018

Rank	Player	Club	Goals
1	(Georgia (country)) Giorgi Gabedava	Chikhura Sachkhere	22
1	(Georgia (country)) Budu Zivzivadze	Dinamo Tbilisi	22
3	(Ukraine) Mykola Kovtalyuk	Dila Gori	21
4	(Brazil) Leandro	Dila Gori	14
4	(Georgia (country)) Tornike Kapanadze	Torpedo Kutaisi	14
6	(Georgia (country)) Mamia Gavashelishvili	Locomotive Tbilisi	11
6	(Brazil) Vagner Goncalves	FC Saburtalo	11
6	(Georgia (country)) Otar Kiteishvili	Dinamo Tbilisi	11
9	(Georgia (country)) Giorgi Kokhreidze	FC Saburtalo	8
9	(Georgia (country)) Levan Kutalia	Torpedo Kutaisi	8
9	(Georgia (country)) Akaki Shulaia	Dinamo Tbilisi	8

=== Hat-tricks ===
Player	For	Against	Result	Date	Ref
(Georgia (country)) Giorgi Gabedava	Chikhura Sachkhere	Kolkheti Poti	6-1	3 March 2018	
(Brazil) Leandro Ribeiro	Dila Gori	Saburtalo Tbilisi	4-1	20 May 2018	
(Georgia (country)) Irakli Lekvtadze	Chikhura Sachkhere	Sioni Bolnisi	4-0	5 July 2018	
(Georgia (country)) Dato Kirkitadze	Sioni Bolnisi	FC Samtredia	4-0	10 August 2018	
(Georgia (country)) Budu Zivzivadze	Dinamo Tbilisi	Locomotive Tbilisi	4-2	12 August 2018	
(Georgia (country)) Tornike Kapanadze	Torpedo Kutaisi	FC Samtredia	8-0	11 November 2018	
(Georgia (country)) Giorgi Gabedava	Chikhura Sachkhere	Dinamo Tbilisi	4-1	11 November 2018	
(Georgia (country)) Budu Zivzivadze^{4}	Dinamo Tbilisi	Sioni Bolnisi	5-2	30 November 2018	

- ^{4} Player scored 4 goals
- ^{5} Player scored 5 goals
