= 2022 FC Dinamo Batumi season =

Dinamo Batumi
Dinamo Batumi season
- Chairman: (Georgia (country)) Vladimir Dvalishvili
- Manager: (Georgia (country)) Gia Geguchadze
- Stadium: Batumi Stadium
- Georgian Super Cup: Winners
- UEFA Champions League: First Qualifying Round
| Home colours | Away colours |

During the 2022 season Dinamo Batumi the club will be participating in the following competitions: Erovnuli Liga, Georgian Super Cup, UEFA Champions League, UEFA Europa Conference League. Amos Nondi

== Current squad ==
As of 14 July 2022 Source

Note: Flags indicate national team as defined under FIFA eligibility rules; some limited exceptions apply. Players may hold more than one non-FIFA nationality.

| No. | Pos. | Nation | Player |
|---|---|---|---|
| 1 | GK | GEO | Mikheil Alavidze |
| 3 | MF | NGA | Benjamin Teidi |
| 4 | DF | GEO | Luka Kapianidze |
| 5 | DF | UKR | Oleksandr Azatskyi |
| 6 | MF | GEO | Tornike Gaprindashvili |
| 7 | FW | GEO | Mate Vatsadze |
| 8 | MF | GEO | Jaba Jighauri |
| 9 | FW | GEO | Irakli Bidzinashvili |
| 10 | MF | GEO | Guga Palavandishvili |
| 11 | MF | GEO | Giorgi Zaria |
| 13 | GK | GEO | Lazare Kupatadze |
| 14 | FW | GEO | Giorgi Pantsulaia |

| No. | Pos. | Nation | Player |
|---|---|---|---|
| 16 | DF | GEO | Irakli Azarovi |
| 17 | MF | GEO | Vladimer Mamuchashvili |
| 18 | DF | GEO | Giorgi Rekhviashvili |
| 19 | MF | GEO | Sandro Altunashvili |
| 21 | GK | GEO | Giorgi Begashvili |
| 22 | MF | GEO | Giorgi Navalovski |
| 23 | DF | GEO | Mamuka Kobakhidze |
| 24 | MF | SRB | Milan Radin |
| 30 | FW | GEO | Zuriko Davitashvili |
| 35 | DF | GEO | Grigol Chabradze |
| 40 | FW | BRA | Flamarion |

== Competitions ==
=== Club Friendlies ===
| 20 January 2022 Friendly | (Poland) Lech Poznań | 1 - 2 | (Georgia (country)) Dinamo Batumi | Belek |
| | | Report | | Stadium: Susesi Sport Center A |

| 23 January 2022 Friendly | (Georgia (country)) Dinamo Batumi | 3 - 3 | (Poland) Raków Częstochowa | Belek |
| 16:00 EET | | Report | | Stadium: Susesi Sport Center A |

| 5 February 2022 Friendly | (Serbia) Partizan | 3 - 1 | (Georgia (country)) Dinamo Batumi | Belek |
| 16:00 EET | | Report | | Stadium: Susesi Sport Center A |

| 8 February 2022 Friendly | (Russia) Rubin Kazan | 2 - 2 | (Georgia (country)) Dinamo Batumi | Belek |
| 10:30 EET | | Report | | Stadium: Susesi Sport Center A |

| 13 February 2022 Friendly | (Russia) Nizhny Novgorod | 1 - 1 | (Georgia (country)) Dinamo Batumi | Belek |
| 16:00 EET | | Report | | Stadium: Susesi Sport Center A |

| 14 February 2022 Friendly | (Ukraine) Inhulets | 1 - 2 | (Georgia (country)) Dinamo Batumi | Belek |
| 15:00 EET | | Report | | Stadium: Susesi Sport Center A |

=== Erovnuli Liga ===
==== Results summary ====
| Overall | | | | | | | | Home | | | | | | Away | | | | | |
| Pld | W | D | L | GF | GA | GD | Pts | W | D | L | GF | GA | GD | W | D | L | GF | GA | GD |
|---|---|---|---|---|---|---|---|---|---|---|---|---|---|---|---|---|---|---|---|
| 20 | 14 | 5 | 1 | 55 | 14 | +41 | 47 | 9 | 2 | 0 | 40 | 11 | +29 | 5 | 3 | 1 | 15 | 3 | +12 |

Last updated: 29 June 2022.
Source: Soccerway

===== Results by round =====
| Round | 1 | 2 | 3 | 4 | 5 | 6 | 7 | 8 | 9 | 10 | 11 | 12 | 13 | 14 | 15 | 16 | 17 | 18 | 19 | 20 | 21 |
|---|---|---|---|---|---|---|---|---|---|---|---|---|---|---|---|---|---|---|---|---|---|
| Ground | H | H | A | H | A | H | A | H | A | A | A | H | A | H | A | H | A | H | H | H | A |
| Result | W | W | L | D | W | W | W | W | W | D | D | W | D | W | W | D | W | W | W | W | |
| Position | 1 | 1 | 2 | 3 | 1 | 1 | 1 | 1 | 1 | 1 | 1 | 1 | 1 | 1 | 1 | 1 | 1 | 1 | 1 | 1 | |

Updated to match(es) played on 29 June 2022. Source: worldfootball
A = Away; H = Home; W = Win; D = Draw; L = Loss

==== Matches ====
| 25 February 2022 1 | Dinamo Batumi | 4 - 0 | Sioni | Batumi |
| 18:00 GET | Irakli Bidzinashvili 36'; Mamuchashvili 61' (pen.) 77'; Flamarion 72' | Report | Ivan Potskhveria (yellow card) 24'; Varlam Kilasonia (yellow card) 61' | Stadium: Batumi Stadium; Referee: (Georgia (country)) Goga Kikacheishvili |

| 4 March 2022 2 | Dinamo Batumi | 3 - 0 | Dinamo Tbilisi | Batumi |
| 19:30 GET | Flamarion 11' 24'; Tornike Gaprindashvili (yellow card) 45+3'; Irakli Bidzinashvili 63'; Navalovski (yellow card) 80' | Report | Camara (yellow card) 35'; Osei (yellow card) 45+2'; Giorgi Moistsrapishvili (yellow card) 45+3'; Kalandadze (yellow card) 49' | Stadium: Batumi Stadium; Referee: (Georgia (country)) Iraki Kvirikashvilli |

| 8 March 2022 3 | Dila | 2 - 1 | Dinamo Batumi | Gori |
| 18:00 GET | Amos Nondi (yellow card) 24'; Honore Gomis (yellow card) 32' (goal) 67'; Nika Gagnidze (yellow card) 41'; Tamaz Makatsaria 83'; Chichinadze (yellow card) 90+1'; Paata Gudushauri (yellow card) 90+4' | Report | Palavandishvili (yellow card) 28'; Tornike Gaprindashvili 53'; Denković (yellow card) 72' (yellow-red card) 90+4'; Zaria (yellow card) 78'; Ananidze (yellow card) 90+4' | Stadium: Tengiz Burjanadze Stadium; Referee: (Georgia (country)) Davit Kharitonashvilli |

| 13 March 2022 4 | Dinamo Batumi | 2 - 2 | Saburtalo | Batumi |
| 18:00 GET | Flamarion (yellow card) 30' (goal) 38'; Benjamin Teidi (yellow card) 58'; Altunashvili (yellow card) 70'; Irakli Bidzinashvili 76' | Report | Sikharulidze 26'; Nonikashvili (yellow card) 45+1' (goal) 65'; Giorgi Latsabidze (yellow card) 57'; Oto Goshadze (yellow card) 90+4' | Stadium: Batumi Stadium; Referee: (Georgia (country)) Aleko Aptsiauri |

| 18 March 2022 5 | Locomotive Tbilisi | 0 - 2 | Dinamo Batumi | Tbilisi |
| 18:00 GET | Giorgi Kveladze (yellow card) 5'; Zura Zosiashvili (yellow card) 28'; Davit Samurkasovi (yellow card) 82' | Report | Irakli Bidzinashvili (yellow card) 16' (goal) 45+2'; Chabradze (yellow card) 48'; Benjamin Teidi (yellow card) 55'; Radin 90+2' | Stadium: Mikheil Meskhi Stadium; Referee: (Georgia (country)) Arsen Nonikashvili |

| 2 April 2022 6 | Dinamo Batumi | 1 - 0 | Telavi | Batumi |
| 20:30 GET | Mamuchashvili 33' (pen.) (yellow card) 90+3'; Giorgi Pantsulaia (yellow card) 36'; Elguja Lobjanidze (yellow card) 89' | Report | Lasha Kochladze (yellow card) 21'; Imeda Ashortia (yellow card) 35'; Zurab Tevzadze (yellow card) 68' | Stadium: Batumi Stadium; Referee: (Georgia (country)) Jener Khorava |

| 10 April 2022 7 | Samgurali | 0 - 3 | Dinamo Batumi | Zestaponi |
| 16:00 GET | Levan Kurdadze (yellow card) 23'; Davit Maisashvili (yellow card) 51'; Omar Patarkatsishvili (yellow card) 61'; Luqman Gilmore (yellow card) 65' | Report | Flamarion 2'; Mikheil Alavidze (yellow card) 6'; Tornike Gaprindashvili (yellow card) 36'; Elguja Lobjanidze 79'; Palavandishvili (yellow card) 83' (goal) 85' | Stadium: David Abashidze Stadium; Referee: (Georgia (country)) Iraki Kvirikashvili |

| 18 April 2022 8 | Dinamo Batumi | 5 - 2 | Gagra | Batumi |
| 21:00 GET | Flamarion 4' 62'; Khvicha Kvaratskhelia 7' 26'; Altunashvili (yellow card) 60'; Radin 86' | Report | Teimuraz Shonia 10'; Luka Nozadze (yellow card) 47'; Giorgi Vekua (yellow card) 76'; Giorgi Bukhaidze 80' | Stadium: Batumi Stadium; Referee: (Georgia (country)) Goga Kikacheishvili |

| 23 April 2022 9 | Torpedo Kutaisi | 0 - 3 | Dinamo Batumi | Kutaisi |
| 20:00 GET | Mandzhgaladze (yellow card) 11' | Report | Flamarion 13' 25'; Khvicha Kvaratskhelia 64' | Stadium: Ramaz Shengelia Stadium; Referee: (Georgia (country)) Girogi Kruashvili |

| 29 April 2022 10 | Sioni | 1 - 1 | Dinamo Batumi | Bolnisi |
| 15:00 GET | Ivan Potskhveria (yellow card) 11'; Luka Khorkheli (yellow card) 45+3'; Nika Khorkheli (yellow card) 53'; Toma Tabatadze 82' | Report | Kobakhidze (yellow card) 18'; Irakli Bidzinashvili 44'; Palavandishvili (yellow card) 45+3'; Altunashvili (yellow card) 74'; Mamuchashvili (yellow card) 90+4' | Stadium: Tamaz Stepania Stadium; Referee: (Georgia (country)) Irakli Kherkhadze |

| 3 May 2022 11 | Dinamo Tbilisi | 0 - 0 | Dinamo Batumi | Tbilisi |
| 19:00 GET | | Report | Benjamin Teidi (yellow card) 44'; Radin (yellow card) 80'; Palavandishvili (yellow card) 87' | Stadium: Boris Paichadze Dinamo Arena; Referee: (Georgia (country)) Girogi Kruashvilli |

| 8 May 2022 12 | Dinamo Batumi | 3 - 0 | Dila | Batumi |
| 21:00 GET | Kvaratskhelia 30'; Benjamin Teidi (yellow card) 49'; Radin (yellow card) 55'; Jighauri 81'; Tornike Gaprindashvili 84' | Report | Amos Nondi (yellow card) 52'; Revaz Chiteishvili (yellow card) 58'; Alef Santos (yellow card) 59'; Demetre Buliskeria (yellow card) 81'; Chichinadze (yellow card) 88' | Stadium: Batumi Stadium; Referee: (Georgia (country)) Goga Kikacheishvilli |

=== Georgian Super Cup ===
| 20 February 2022 Final | Dinamo Batumi | 0 - 0 (5 - 3 p) | Saburtalo | Kutaisi |
| 17:00 GET | Mamuchashvili (yellow card) 11'; Tornike Gaprindashvili (yellow card) 28'; Palavandishvili (yellow card) 65' | Report | Bakar Kardava (yellow card) 32'; Levan Nonikashvili (yellow card) 70'; Kavtaradze (yellow card) 80' | Stadium: Ramaz Shengelia Stadium; Referee: (Georgia (country)) Arsen Nonikashvili |
