= List of Georgian football transfers winter 2022–23 =

This is a list of Georgian football transfers winter 2022–23.

== Erovnuli Liga ==
=== Dinamo Batumi ===
In: Note: Flags indicate national team as defined under FIFA eligibility rules; some limited exceptions apply. Players may hold more than one non-FIFA nationality.

No.	Pos.	Nation	Player
—	MF	UKR	Ivan Lytvynenko (from (Ukraine) Chornomorets Odesa)
8	DF	GEO	Guram Giorbelidze (on loan from (Poland) Zagłębie Lubin)

Out: Note: Flags indicate national team as defined under FIFA eligibility rules; some limited exceptions apply. Players may hold more than one non-FIFA nationality.

No.	Pos.	Nation	Player
—	DF	UKR	Oleksandr Azatskyi (to (Poland) Arka Gdynia)
—	MF	NGA	Benjamin Teidi (to (Israel) Maccabi Bnei Reineh)
—	MF	GEO	Jaba Jighauri (to (Kazakhstan) Caspiy)
—	FW	GEO	Giorgi Pantsulaia (to (Kazakhstan) Caspiy)

=== Dinamo Tbilisi ===
In: Note: Flags indicate national team as defined under FIFA eligibility rules; some limited exceptions apply. Players may hold more than one non-FIFA nationality.

No.	Pos.	Nation	Player
27	MF	GEO	Giorgi Kharaishvili (on loan from (Hungary) Ferencváros)

Out: Note: Flags indicate national team as defined under FIFA eligibility rules; some limited exceptions apply. Players may hold more than one non-FIFA nationality.

No.	Pos.	Nation	Player
—	MF	GEO	Georgi Kutsia (on loan to (Latvia) Liepāja)
—	MF	GEO	Jaba Jighauri (to (Kazakhstan) Caspiy)
—	FW	UKR	Stanislav Bilenkyi (to (Israel) Maccabi Netanya)

=== Dila Gori ===
In: Note: Flags indicate national team as defined under FIFA eligibility rules; some limited exceptions apply. Players may hold more than one non-FIFA nationality.

No.	Pos.	Nation	Player

Out: Note: Flags indicate national team as defined under FIFA eligibility rules; some limited exceptions apply. Players may hold more than one non-FIFA nationality.

No.	Pos.	Nation	Player
—	MF	BRA	Alvaro (loan return to (Ukraine) Lviv)
—	MF	KEN	Amos Nondi (to Ararat-Armenia)

=== Gagra ===
In: Note: Flags indicate national team as defined under FIFA eligibility rules; some limited exceptions apply. Players may hold more than one non-FIFA nationality.

No.	Pos.	Nation	Player

Out: Note: Flags indicate national team as defined under FIFA eligibility rules; some limited exceptions apply. Players may hold more than one non-FIFA nationality.

No.	Pos.	Nation	Player
—	FW	GEO	Tamaz Makatsaria (to (Kazakhstan) Akzhayik)

=== Locomotive Tbilisi ===
In: Note: Flags indicate national team as defined under FIFA eligibility rules; some limited exceptions apply. Players may hold more than one non-FIFA nationality.

No.	Pos.	Nation	Player

Out: Note: Flags indicate national team as defined under FIFA eligibility rules; some limited exceptions apply. Players may hold more than one non-FIFA nationality.

No.	Pos.	Nation	Player

=== Saburtalo Tbilisi ===
In: Note: Flags indicate national team as defined under FIFA eligibility rules; some limited exceptions apply. Players may hold more than one non-FIFA nationality.

No.	Pos.	Nation	Player
—	MF	GEO	Luka Silagadze (from (Latvia) Valmiera)

Out: Note: Flags indicate national team as defined under FIFA eligibility rules; some limited exceptions apply. Players may hold more than one non-FIFA nationality.

No.	Pos.	Nation	Player
—	MF	GEO	Giorgi Gocholeishvili (to (Ukraine) Shakhtar Donetsk)

=== Samgurali Tsqaltubo ===
In: Note: Flags indicate national team as defined under FIFA eligibility rules; some limited exceptions apply. Players may hold more than one non-FIFA nationality.

No.	Pos.	Nation	Player

Out: Note: Flags indicate national team as defined under FIFA eligibility rules; some limited exceptions apply. Players may hold more than one non-FIFA nationality.

No.	Pos.	Nation	Player
—	MF	NGA	Luqman Gilmore (to (Latvia) Liepāja)

=== Samtredia ===
In: Note: Flags indicate national team as defined under FIFA eligibility rules; some limited exceptions apply. Players may hold more than one non-FIFA nationality.

No.	Pos.	Nation	Player
—	MF	AZE	Abdulla Khaybulayev (on loan from (Azerbaijan) Sabah)
19	MF	GEO	Giorgi Papunashvili (from (Serbia) Radnički Niš)
—	FW	GEO	Revaz Injgia (from (Cyprus) Apollon Limassol)

Out: Note: Flags indicate national team as defined under FIFA eligibility rules; some limited exceptions apply. Players may hold more than one non-FIFA nationality.

No.	Pos.	Nation	Player

=== Shukura Kobuleti ===
In: Note: Flags indicate national team as defined under FIFA eligibility rules; some limited exceptions apply. Players may hold more than one non-FIFA nationality.

No.	Pos.	Nation	Player
—	MF	GEO	Lasha Kvaratskhelia (from (Latvia) Daugavpils)

Out: Note: Flags indicate national team as defined under FIFA eligibility rules; some limited exceptions apply. Players may hold more than one non-FIFA nationality.

No.	Pos.	Nation	Player

=== Sioni Bolnisi ===
In: Note: Flags indicate national team as defined under FIFA eligibility rules; some limited exceptions apply. Players may hold more than one non-FIFA nationality.

No.	Pos.	Nation	Player

Out: Note: Flags indicate national team as defined under FIFA eligibility rules; some limited exceptions apply. Players may hold more than one non-FIFA nationality.

No.	Pos.	Nation	Player

=== Telavi ===
In: Note: Flags indicate national team as defined under FIFA eligibility rules; some limited exceptions apply. Players may hold more than one non-FIFA nationality.

No.	Pos.	Nation	Player

Out: Note: Flags indicate national team as defined under FIFA eligibility rules; some limited exceptions apply. Players may hold more than one non-FIFA nationality.

No.	Pos.	Nation	Player
—	GK	GEO	Luka Sanikidze (to (Latvia) Liepāja)
―	MF	SRB	Strahinja Pavišić (to (Slovenia) MFK Tatran Liptovský Mikuláš)

=== Torpedo Kutaisi ===
In: Note: Flags indicate national team as defined under FIFA eligibility rules; some limited exceptions apply. Players may hold more than one non-FIFA nationality.

No.	Pos.	Nation	Player
—	DF	ALB	Ardit Toli (from (Ukraine) Vorskla Poltava)
—	FW	MKD	Dashmir Elezi (from (North Macedonia) Shkëndija)

Out: Note: Flags indicate national team as defined under FIFA eligibility rules; some limited exceptions apply. Players may hold more than one non-FIFA nationality.

No.	Pos.	Nation	Player
—	MF	GEO	Mate Tsintsadze (to (Kazakhstan) Zhetysu)
—	MF	RUS	Nodar Kavtaradze (to (Uzbekistan) Andijon)
