= 2023 FC Dinamo Batumi season =

Dinamo Batumi
2023 season
- Chairman: (Georgia (country)) Archil Beridze
- Manager: (Georgia (country)) Gia Geguchadze (until 21 August) (Ukraine) Andriy Demchenko (after 25 August)
- Stadium: Batumi Stadium
- Erovnuli Liga: Champions
- Georgian Cup: Runners-up
- Georgian Super Cup: Runners-up
- UEFA Conference League: First Qualifying Round
- Top goalscorer: League: Flamarion (17 goals); All: Flamarion (21 goals)
- Biggest win: 6–0 vs Shukura (A), 2 October, Erovnuli Liga
- Biggest defeat: 6–2 vs Dinamo Tbilisi (A), 28 November, Erovnuli Liga
Home colours	Away colours

The 2023 season was the 100th season in the existence of Dinamo Batumi and their fifth successive season in the Erovnuli Liga, the top division of Georgian football. In addition to the domestic league, this year the club participated in the national cup, the Georgian Super Cup and UEFA Europa Conference League.

== Events ==
This section covers the period from 1 January to 31 December 2023.

On 11 January 2023, Luka Zarandia joined the team on a year-long contract.

The next day, the club welcomed Giorgi Kvernadze on loan from Kolkheti Poti and Nemanja Ljubisavljević on a one-year contract from Žalgiris.

On 24 January, Senegalese forward Moussa Konate signed a 1-year contract with the club.

On 25 January, Vladan Vidaković was signed on a year-long loan deal from NK Maribor.

On 12 February, Ukrainian midfielder Ivan Lytvynenko joined Dinamo on a three-year deal.

On 22 February, the club announced the return of Benjamin Teidi on a one-year contract and the signing of Guram Giorbelidze on a six-month loan.

On 1 March, Dinamo signed Montenegrin defender Saša Balić on a year-long contract.

On 26 June, Sandro Altunashvili left Dinamo for Austrian club Wolfsberger AC.

On 30 June, Giorgi Kvernadze signed with Frosinone.

On 7 July, the club signed Roin Kvaskhvadze, Levan Kharabadze, Tsotne Patsatsia and Vitinho. Also, Nikolai Kipiani joined Dinamo from Telavi as a free agent, although moved to Ararat-Armenia on 21 September.

On 4 July, Giorgi Tsitaishvili was signed on loan from Dynamo Kyiv.

On 29 July, the club and Vladan Vidaković parted ways.

On 31 July, goalkeeper Luka Kharatishvili was loaned to Samtredia until the end of the season.

On 21 August, head coach Gia Geguchadze left Dinamo Batumi.

Four days later, he was replaced by Andriy Demchenko on a deal until the end of 2025.

On 24 November, after a 3–0 win over Telavi and with two games still to play, Dinamo Batumi won the national league for the second time in their history.

On 8 December, four days after receiving the Player of the Year award from the Erovnuli Liga, Flamarion, left Dinamo and joined Valenciennes.

On 26 December, midfielder Giorgi Zaria signed a two-year contract with Kazakhstan Premier League club Kairat.

== Squad ==
As of match played 2 December 2023

Note: Flags indicate national team as has been defined under FIFA eligibility rules. Players may hold more than one non-FIFA nationality.

No.	Player	Nat.	Positions	Date of birth (age)	Signed in	Apps.	Goals
Goalkeepers
21	Giorgi Begashvili	(Georgia (country))	GK	12 February 1991 (age 35)	2022	1	0
31	Anton Chichkan	(Belarus)	GK	10 July 1995 (age 31)	2022	16	0
13	Luka Kharatishvili	(Georgia (country))	GK	11 January 2003 (age 23)	2023	3	0
1	Roin Kvaskhvadze	(Georgia (country))	GK	31 May 1989 (age 37)	2023	16	0
Defenders
15	Mukhran Bagrationi	(Georgia (country))	DF	13 February 2004 (age 22)	2022	15	0
33	Saša Balić	(Montenegro)	DF	29 January 1990 (age 36)	2023	27	0
35	Grigol Chabradze	(Georgia (country))	DF	20 April 1996 (age 30)	2021	29	0
2	Guram Giorbelidze	(Georgia (country))	DF	25 February 1996 (age 30)	2023	11	0
4	Luka Kapianidze	(Georgia (country))	DF	10 January 1999 (age 27)	2022	5	0
12	Levan Kharabadze	(Georgia (country))	DF	26 January 2000 (age 26)	2023	16	2
23	Mamuka Kobakhidze	(Georgia (country))	DF	23 August 1992 (age 33)	2019	35	2
16	Davit Paghava	(Georgia (country))	DF	24 September 2005 (age 20)	2023	1	0
35	Giorgi Rekhviashvili	(Georgia (country))	DF	1 February 1988 (age 38)	2022	10	0
Midfielders
19	Sandro Altunashvili	(Georgia (country))	MF	19 May 1997 (age 29)	2021	18	1
24	Irakli Bidzinashvili	(Georgia (country))	MF	27 February 1997 (age 29)	2022	32	7
27	Paata Gudushauri	(Georgia (country))	MF	7 June 1997 (age 29)	2022	32	12
8	Alexander Jakobsen	(Egypt)	MF	18 March 1994 (age 32)	2023	18	3
	Nikolai Kipiani	(Russia)	MF	25 January 1997 (age 29)	2023	0	0
30	Giorgi Kharebava	(Georgia (country))	MF	26 February 1994 (age 32)	2023	3	0
5	Ivan Lytvynenko	(Ukraine)	MF	10 April 2001 (age 25)	2023	16	0
17	Lado Mamuchashvili	(Georgia (country))	MF	29 August 1997 (age 28)	2018	33	12
6	Tsotne Mosiashvili	(Georgia (country))	MF	14 February 1995 (age 31)	2022	26	0
30	Tsotne Patsatsia	(Georgia (country))	MF	28 March 2000 (age 26)	2023	15	3
26	Giorgi Putkaradze	(Georgia (country))	MF	12 November 2005 (age 20)	2023	1	0
3	Benjamin Teidi	(Nigeria)	MF	5 May 1994 (age 32)	2019	29	3
20	Giorgi Tsitaishvili	(Georgia (country))	MF	18 November 2000 (age 25)	2023	17	4
14	Vladan Vidaković	(Serbia)	MF	14 March 1999 (age 27)	2023	12	0
19	Vitinho	(Brazil)	MF	8 September 1997 (age 28)	2023	5	0
7	Giorgi Zaria	(Georgia (country))	MF	14 July 1997 (age 29)	2021	33	9
Forwards
40	Flamarion	(Brazil)	FW	30 July 1996 (age 30)	2018	32	17
9	Tornike Kapanadze	(Georgia (country))	FW	4 June 1992 (age 34)	2022	25	2
29	Moussa Konate	(Senegal)	FW	3 April 1993 (age 33)	2023	13	2
20	Giorgi Kvernadze	(Georgia (country))	FW	7 February 2003 (age 23)	2023	7	0
11	Mate Vatsadze	(Georgia (country))	FW	17 December 1988 (age 37)	2022	14	1

=== Out on loan ===
Note: Flags indicate national team as defined under FIFA eligibility rules; some limited exceptions apply. Players may hold more than one non-FIFA nationality.

No.	Pos.	Nation	Player
13	GK	GEO	Luka Kharatishvili (at Samtredia)
—	DF	GEO	Iva Gelashvili (at Spezia)

No.	Pos.	Nation	Player
—	FW	GEO	Davit Zurabiani (at Kolkheti 1913)

== Pre-season friendlies ==
Win Draw Loss

Traditionally, Dinamo Batumi spent a pre-season preparation period in Turkey.

20 January 2023	Widzew Łódź	4–2	Dinamo Batumi	Antalya, Turkey
		Report

23 January 2023	Malisheva	1–0	Dinamo Batumi	Antalya, Turkey
		Report

26 January 2023	Sturm Graz	2–2	Dinamo Batumi	Antalya, Turkey
		Report	Kapianidze 64'; Kvernadze 82'

5 February 2023	Dinamo Batumi	4–2	Oleksandriya	Antalya, Turkey
	Mamuchashvili; Rekhviashvili (o.g.); Bidzinashvili	Report

9 February 2023	Liepaja	0–3	Dinamo Batumi	Antalya, Turkey
		Report	Bidzinashvili 2'; Gudushauri 30'; Zaria 76'

13 February 2023	Pakhtakor	0–2	Dinamo Batumi	Antalya, Turkey
		Report	Flamarion 2'; Vatsadze 15'

16 February 2023	Aksu	0–1	Dinamo Batumi	Antalya, Turkey
		Report	Vatsadze 77'

== Competitions ==
=== Overview ===
Competition	First match	Last match	Starting round	Final position	Record							
Competition	First match	Last match	Starting round	Final position	Pld	W	D	L	GF	GA	GD	Win %
Erovnuli Liga	26 February 2023	2 December 2023	Matchday 1	Winners	36	21	11	4	83	41	+42	58.33
Georgian Cup	30 July 2023	6 December 2023	Quarterfinal	Runners-up	4	3	0	1	9	3	+6	75.00
Super Cup	30 June 2023	4 July 2023	Semifinal	Runners-up	2	0	2	0	1	1	+0	0.00
UEFA Europa Conference League	13 July 2023	20 July 2023	1st qualifying round	1st qualifying round	2	0	1	1	2	3	−1	0.00
Total					44	24	14	6	95	48	+47	54.55

Source: Competitions

=== Erovnuli Liga ===
==== Results summary ====
Overall								Home						Away					
Pld	W	D	L	GF	GA	GD	Pts	W	D	L	GF	GA	GD	W	D	L	GF	GA	GD
36	21	11	4	83	41	+42	74	11	6	1	41	18	+23	10	5	3	42	23	+19

Last updated: 2 December 2023.
Source: See Results

==== Results by round ====
Round	1	2	3	4	5	6	7	8	9	10	11	12	13	14	15	16	17	18	19	20	21	22	23	24	25	26	27	28	29	30	31	32	33	34	35	36
Ground	H	H	A	H	A	H	A	H	A	A	A	H	A	H	A	H	A	H	H	H	H	A	H	A	A	H	A	A	A	H	A	H	A	H	A	H
Result	W	W	D	W	W	W	W	D	D	W	D	L	W	W	D	W	W	D	W	W	D	W	W	L	W	D	W	W	D	D	W	W	L	W	L	D

Source: See Results
A = Away; H = Home; W = Win; D = Draw; L = Loss

=== Results ===
26 February 2023 1	Dinamo Batumi	2–1	Shukura	Batumi
20:00	Bidzinashvili 45+2'; Mamuchashvili 74' (pen.)	Report	Patsatsia 61' (pen.)	Stadium: Batumi Stadium; Referee: G.Avazashvili

3 March 2023 2	Dinamo Batumi	3–1	Saburtalo	Batumi
20:00	Kapanadze 49'; Bidzinashvili 56'; Flamarion 60'	Report	S.Nonikashvili 32'	Stadium: Batumi Stadium; Referee: I.Kvirikashvili

8 March 2023 3	Dila	1–1	Dinamo Batumi	Gori
20:00	Gale 3'	Report	Mamuchashvili 74'	Stadium: Tengiz Burjanadze Stadium; Referee: G.Kruashvili

12 March 2023 4	Dinamo Batumi	3–2	Samtredia	Batumi
20:00	Bidzinashvili 24'; Teidi 68'; Flamarion 79'	Report	Gvishiani 20'; Nachkebia 49'	Stadium: Batumi Stadium; Referee: G.Kikacheishvili

18 March 2023 5	Gagra	1–4	Dinamo Batumi	Tbilisi
15:00	Museliani 59'	Report	Flamarion 19', 34', 51'; Gudushauri 42'	Stadium: Ilia Kokaia Football Centre; Referee: B.Ninua

2 April 2023 6	Dinamo Batumi	2–0	Samgurali	Batumi
21:00	Gudushauri 8'; Altunashvili 24'	Report		Stadium: Batumi Stadium; Referee: D.Kharitonashvili

8 April 2023 7	Telavi	1–4	Dinamo Batumi	Telavi
18:00	Parkinashvili 10'	Report	Zaria 16'; Teidi 64'; Mamuchashvili 68' (pen.); Konaté 83'	Stadium: Kavkasioni Arena; Referee: I.Kvirikashvili

12 April 2023 8	Dinamo Batumi	2–2	Dinamo Tbilisi	Batumi
19:00	Imran 41'; Skhirtladze 75'	Report	Gudushauri 16'; Flamarion 24'	Stadium: Batumi Stadium; Referee: A.Nonikashvili

21 April 2023 9	Torpedo Kutaisi	0–0	Dinamo Batumi	Samtredia
16:00		Report		Stadium: Erosi Manjgaladze Stadium; Referee: J.Khorava

26 April 2023 10	Shukura	1–3	Dinamo Batumi	Batumi
16:30	Patsatsia 52' (pen.)	Report	Flamarion 38'; Zaria 68'; Kapanadze 82'	Stadium: Angisa stadium Referee: G.Kruashvili

30 April 2023 11	Saburtalo	3–3	Dinamo Batumi	Rustavi
19:00	Silagadze 87'; Sylla 89', 90+12' (pen.)	Report	Gudushauri 40'; Zaria 47'; Mamuchashvili 73' (pen.)	Stadium: Technical Centre; Referee: D.Kharitonashvili

3 May 2023 12	Dinamo Batumi	0–2	Dila	Batumi
21:00		Report	Wanderson 69'; Kovtalyuk 86'	Stadium: Batumi Stadium; Referee: G.Avazashvili

10 May 2023 13	Samtredia	1–2	Dinamo Batumi	Samtredia
16:30	Abuladze 65'	Report	Mamuchashvili 4'; Konaté 74'	Stadium: Erosi Manjgaladze stadium Referee: G.Kikacheishvili

14 May 2023 14	Dinamo Batumi	3–1	Gagra	Batumi
21:00	Zaria 4'; Flamarion 18', 79'	Report	Museliani 75' (pen.)	Stadium: Batumi Stadium; Referee: B.Ninua

20 May 2023 15	Samgurali	1–1	Dinamo Batumi	Tskaltubo
21:00	Nikabadze 11'	Report	Mamuchashvili 32'	Stadium: 26 May stadium Referee: A.Aptsiauri

24 May 2023 16	Dinamo Batumi	2–0	Telavi	Batumi
21:00	Flamarion 35', 90+5'	Report		Stadium: Batumi Stadium; Referee: G.Kruashvili

28 May 2023 17	Dinamo Tbilisi	1–2	Dinamo Batumi	Tbilisi
21:00	Skhirtladze 45+2'	Report	Teidi 30'; Flamarion 61'	Stadium: Boris Paichadze Dinamo Arena; Referee: G.Kikacheishvili

1 June 2023 18	Dinamo Batumi	1–1	Torpedo Kutaisi	Batumi
21:00	Mamuchashvili 85' (pen.)	Report	Shergelashvili 90+7'	Stadium: Batumi Stadium; Referee: G.Avazashvili

5 June 2023 20	Dinamo Batumi	2–1	Saburtalo	Batumi
21:00	Flamarion 77'; Mamuchashvili 85' (pen.)	Report	Sylla 19'	Stadium: Batumi Stadium; Referee: I.Kvirikashvili

5 August 2023 19	Dinamo Batumi	5–0	Shukura	Batumi
21:00	Mamuchashvili 38' (pen.); Bidzinashvili 47'; Kobakhidze 54'; Vatsadze 61'; Kharabadze 85'	Report		Stadium: Batumi Stadium; Referee: G.Kruashvili

19 August 2023 22	Dinamo Batumi	1–1	Samtredia	Batumi
21:00	Flamarion 90+8'	Report	Khaibullayev 70'	Stadium: Batumi Stadium; Referee: I.Kvirikashvili

27 August 2023 23	Gagra	0–2	Dinamo Batumi	Tbilisi
21:00		Report	Sultanishvili 90+1' (o.g.); Gudushauri 90+6'	Stadium: Davit Petriashvili Arena; Referee: G.Kikacheishvili

1 September 2023 24	Dinamo Batumi	4–1	Samgurali	Batumi
21:00	Kikabidze 28' (o.g.); Mamuchashvili 35'; Zaria 66'; Jakobsen 90+6'	Report	Kagayama 57'	Stadium: Batumi Stadium; Referee: I.Kvirikashvili

16 September 2023 25	Telavi	2–1	Dinamo Batumi	Telavi
18:00	Désiré 49'; Protasov 90'	Report	Gudushauri 57'	Stadium: Kavkasioni Arena; Referee: A.Aptsiauri

20 September 2023 21	Dila	1–3	Dinamo Batumi	Gori
20:00	Sardalishvili 80'	Report	Tsitaishvili 2'; Kharabadze 14'; Gudushauri 58'	Stadium: Tengiz Burjanadze Stadium; Referee: G.Avazashvili

24 September 2023 26	Dinamo Batumi	2–2	Dinamo Tbilisi	Batumi
21:00	Mamuchashvili 4'; Gudushauri 73'	Report	Cadete 37'; Kharaishvili 52'	Stadium: Batumi Stadium; Referee: G.Kikacheishvili

28 September 2023 27	Torpedo Kutaisi	0–3	Dinamo Batumi	Kutaisi
20:00		Report	Zaria 55'; Flamarion 59'; Gudushauri 81'	Stadium: Ramaz Shengelia Stadium; Referee: G.Kruashvili

2 October 2023 28	Shukura	0–6	Dinamo Batumi	Batumi
14:30		Report	Zaria 14' (pen.); Gudushauri 31'; Tsitaishvili 22' (pen.), 34', 41'; Jacobsen 69' (pen.)	Stadium: Angisa stadium Referee: G.Avazashvili

8 October 2023 29	Saburtalo	0–0	Dinamo Batumi	Tbilisi
20:00		Report		Stadium: Mikheil Meskhi reserve stadium Referee: B.Ninua

20 October 2023 30	Dinamo Batumi	1–1	Dila	Batumi
20:00	Zaria 42' (pen.)	Report	Kovtalyuk 12'	Stadium: Batumi Stadium; Referee: I.Kvirikashvili

28 October 2023 31	Samtredia	1–3	Dinamo Batumi	Samtredia
15:00	Nachkebia 53'	Report	Bidzinashvili 3'; Mamuchashvili 41'; Patsatsia 76'	Stadium: Erosi Manjgaladze stadium Referee: G.Kikacheishvili

3 November 2023 32	Dinamo Batumi	3–0	Gagra	Batumi
21:00	Bidzinashvili 7'; Patsatsia 71'; Flamarion 87'	Report		Stadium: Batumi Stadium; Referee: A.Aptsiauri

11 November 2023 33	Samgurali	3–2	Dinamo Batumi	Samtredia
14:30	Verulidze 25'; Maisashvili 47'; Kalandarishvili 90+5'	Report	Gudushauri 1', 32'	Stadium: Erosi Manjgaladze stadium Referee: G.Avazashvili

24 November 2023 34	Dinamo Batumi	3–0	Telavi	Batumi
19:00	Bidzinashvili 24'; Zaria 54'; Patsatsia 90+1'	Report		Stadium: Batumi Stadium; Referee: I.Kvirikashvili

28 November 2023 35	Dinamo Tbilisi	6–2	Dinamo Batumi	Tbilisi
19:00	Khvadagiani 8'; Bidzinashvili 16' (o.g.); Marušić 19'; Kharaishvili 22'; Skhirtladze 34'; Camara 67'	Report	Flamarion 3'; Jacobsen 36'	Stadium: Boris Paichadze Dinamo Arena; Referee: A.Nonikashvili

2 December 2023 36	Dinamo Batumi	2–2	Torpedo Kutaisi	Batumi
14:00	Sandokhadze 6' (o.g.); Kobakhidze 16'	Report	Arabidze 19'; Shergelashvili 64'	Stadium: Batumi Stadium; Referee: G.Avazashvili

==== League table ====
Pos	Team	Pld	W	D	L	GF	GA	GD	Pts	Qualification or relegation
1	Dinamo Batumi (C)	36	21	11	4	83	41	+42	74	Qualification for the Champions League first qualifying round
2	Dinamo Tbilisi	36	21	8	7	93	49	+44	71	Qualification for the Conference League first qualifying round
3	Torpedo Kutaisi	36	16	12	8	55	37	+18	60	Qualification for the Conference League first qualifying round
4	Dila Gori	36	17	9	10	56	39	+17	60	
5	Samgurali Tsqaltubo	36	16	9	11	53	51	+2	57	

Source: Erovnuli Liga, Soccerway
Rules for classification: 1) Points; 2) Head-to-head points; 3) Head-to-head goal difference; 4) Head-to-head goals scored; 5) Head-to-head away goals scored (only if two teams); 6) Goal difference; 7) Goals scored.
(C) Champions

=== Super Cup ===
30 June 2023 Semifinal	Torpedo Kutaisi	0–0 (5–6 p)	Dinamo Batumi	Kutaisi
17:00		Report		Stadium: Ramaz Shengelia Stadium

4 July 2023 Final	Dinamo Tbilisi	1–1 (4–3 p)	Dinamo Batumi	Tbilisi
20:00	Sigua 77'	Report	Flamarion 25'	Stadium: Boris Paichadze Dinamo Arena

=== Georgian Cup ===
30 July 2023 Round of 16	Sioni	0–2	Dinamo Batumi	Bolnisi
16:30		Report	Vatsadze 33'; Kobakhidze 50'	Stadium: Tamaz Stepania stadium Referee: G.Kikacheishvili

24 October 2023 Quarterfinal	Irao Tbilisi	1–4	Dinamo Batumi	Khashuri
19:00	Koniashvili 36'	Report	Tsitaishvili 7'; Mamuchashvili 16' (pen.); Patsatsia 66'; Kapanadze 73'	Stadium: Grigol Jomartidze stadium Referee: I.Kherkhadze

7 November 2023 Semifinal	Kolkheti 1913	1–3	Dinamo Batumi	Poti
18:00	Jijavadze 77'	Report	Jakobsen 50'; Flamarion 86', 90+2'	Stadium: Fazisi; Referee: G.Kruashvili

6 December 2023 Final	Saburtalo	1–0	Dinamo Batumi	Tbilisi
19:00	Sikharulidze 90+2'	Report		Stadium: Mikheil Meskhi reserve stadium Referee: G.Kikacheishvili

=== UEFA Europa Conference League ===
==== 1st qualifying round ====
13 July 2023 1st leg	Tirana (Albania)	1–1	(Georgia (country)) Dinamo Batumi	Tirana, Albania
22:00 (UTC+1)	Lushkja 90+3'	Report	Flamarion 66'	Stadium: Arena Kombëtare; Referee: Robert Jones (England)

20 July 2023 2nd leg	Dinamo Batumi (Georgia (country))	1–2 (2–3 agg.)	(Albania) Tirana	Batumi, Georgia
21:00 (UTC+4)	Kapanadze 90'	Report	Lushkja 28'; Ard.Deliu 77'	Stadium: Batumi Stadium; Referee: Fabio Maresca (Italy)

== Statistics ==
=== Goalscorers ===
Place	Position	Nation	Number	Name	Erovnuli Liga	Georgian Cup	Super Cup	UEFA Europa Conference League	Total
1	FW	(Brazil)	40	Flamarion	17	2	1	1	21
2	MF	(Georgia (country))	17	Lado Mamuchashvili	12	1	–	–	13
3	MF	(Georgia (country))	27	Paata Gudushauri	12	–	–	–	12
4	MF	(Georgia (country))	7	Giorgi Zaria	9	–	–	–	9
5	MF	(Georgia (country))	24	Irakli Bidzinashvili	7	–	–	–	7
6	MF	(Georgia (country))	20	Giorgi Tsitaishvili	4	1	–	–	5
7	MF	(Egypt)	8	Alexander Jakobsen	3	1	–	–	4
7	MF	(Georgia (country))	30	Tsotne Patsatsia	3	1	–	–	4
7	FW	(Georgia (country))	9	Tornike Kapanadze	2	1	–	1	4
10	DF	(Georgia (country))	23	Mamuka Kobakhidze	2	1	–	–	3
10	DF	(Nigeria)	3	Benjamin Teidi	3	–	–	–	3
10				Own goal	3	–	–	–	3
13	DF	(Georgia (country))	12	Levan Kharabadze	2	–	–	–	2
13	FW	(Senegal)	29	Moussa Konaté	2	–	–	–	2
13	FW	(Georgia (country))	11	Mate Vatsadze	1	1	–	–	2
16	MF	(Georgia (country))	19	Sandro Altunashvili	1	–	–	–	1
TOTAL					83	9	1	2	95

=== Clean sheets ===
Place	Position	Nation	Number	Name	Erovnuli Liga	Georgian Cup	Super Cup	UEFA Europa Conference League	Total
1	GK	(Georgia (country))	1	Roin Kvaskhvadze	7	0	0	0	7
2	GK	(Belarus)	31	Anton Chichkan	3	1	1	0	5
TOTAL					10	1	1	0	12

=== Disciplinary record ===
==== Most yellow cards ====
Position	Nation	Number	Name	Erovnuli Liga	Georgian Cup	Super Cup	UEFA Europa Conference League	Total
DF	(Georgia (country))	35	Grigol Chabradze	12	2	0	0	14
DF	(Montenegro)	33	Saša Balić	10	2	2	0	14
MF	(Georgia (country))	24	Irakli Bidzinashvili	7	1	0	0	8
DF	(Nigeria)	3	Benjamin Teidi	5	1	0	1	6
MF	(Georgia (country))	7	Giorgi Zaria	5	1	0	0	6
MF	(Georgia (country))	17	Lado Mamuchashvili	4	1	1	0	6

==== Red cards ====
Position	Nation	Number	Name	Erovnuli Liga	Georgian Cup	Super Cup	UEFA Europa Conference League	Total
MF	(Georgia (country))	19	Sandro Altunashvili	1	0	0	0	1
DF	(Georgia (country))	35	Grigol Chabradze	0	1	0	0	1
MF	(Brazil)	19	Vitinho	1	0	0	0	1
DF	(Georgia (country))	26	Tsotne Mosiashvili	1	0	0	0	1
MF	(Georgia (country))	27	Paata Gudushauri	1	1	0	0	2
TOTAL				4	2	0	0	6

== Awards ==
At the end of this season, the following members of Dinamo Batumi received awards from the Erovnuli Liga at its annual ceremony.

Nationality	Winner	Award
(Brazil)	Flamarion	Player of the Year
(Georgia (country))	Mamuka Kobakhidze	Defender of the Year
(Brazil)	Flamarion	Forward of the Year
(Georgia (country))	Tsotne Patsatsia	Goal of the Year
(Ukraine)	Andriy Demchenko	Manager of the Year

As the league consisted of four parts, Dinamo's manager and players were also recognized throughout the season.

Date	Nationality	Winner	Award
1st quarter of the Year	(Georgia (country))	Lado Mamuchashvili	Team of the 1st quarter
1st quarter of the Year	(Georgia (country))	Mamuka Kobakhidze	Team of the 1st quarter
1st quarter of the Year	(Georgia (country))	Sandro Altunashvili	Team of the 1st quarter
1st quarter of the Year	(Brazil)	Flamarion	Team of the 1st quarter
1st quarter of the Year	(Georgia (country))	Gia Geguchadze	Manager of the 1st quarter
2nd quarter of the Year	(Georgia (country))	Lado Mamuchashvili	Team of the 2nd quarter
2nd quarter of the Year	(Georgia (country))	Paata Gudushauri	Team of the 2nd quarter
4th quarter of the Year	(Georgia (country))	Paata Gudushauri	Team of the 4th quarter
Season	(Georgia (country))	Mamuka Kobakhidze	Team of the Year
Season	(Georgia (country))	Lado Mamuchashvili	Team of the Year
Season	(Georgia (country))	Giorgi Zaria	Team of the Year
Season	(Georgia (country))	Paata Gudushauri	Team of the Year
Season	(Brazil)	Flamarion	Team of the Year
