= Roin Kvaskhvadze =

Georgian footballer

Personal information
- Full name: Roin Kvaskhvadze
- Date of birth: 31 May 1989 (age 37)
- Place of birth: Kutaisi, Georgian SSR
- Height: 1.85 m (6 ft 1 in)
- Position: Goalkeeper

Youth career
- 2003–2005: Tbilisi

Senior career*
Years	Team	Apps	(Gls)
2005–2014	Zestaponi	184	(0)
2014	Torpedo Kutaisi	14	(0)
2014–2015	Othellos Athienou	26	(0)
2015	Pafos	15	(0)
2015–2019	Torpedo Kutaisi	111	(0)
2020–2021	Dinamo Tbilisi	35	(0)
2021–2023	Torpedo Kutaisi	38	(0)
2023–2024	Dinamo Batumi	31	(0)

International career^{‡}
2005	Georgia U-17	3	(0)
2006–2007	Georgia U-19	2	(0)
2008–2010	Georgia U-21	9	(0)
2012–	Georgia	8	(0)
- * Club domestic league appearances and goals as of 1 October 2024 ‡ National team caps and goals as of 21 August 2017

Roin Kvaskhvadze (Georgian: როინ კვასხვაძე, romanized: roin k'vaskhvadze, pronounced [ɾoin kʼʷasχʷadze]; born 31 May 1989) is a retired Georgian professional footballer who played as a goalkeeper.

Kvaskhvadze achieved winning at least one trophy in eight consecutive years starting from 2016 to 2024 Being the winner of 14 trophies, including five league titles with four different clubs, Kvaskhvadze is one of the most decorated Georgian goalkeepers. Twice he was recognized as the Erovnuli Liga Goalkeeper of the Year.

He featured for the U21s and also earned call-ups to the national team. His retirement was announced in July 2025.

== Playing career ==
=== Club ===
==== First decade ====
Kvaskhvadze grew up in the family of footballers, where both his father and grandfather played for Torpedo Kutaisi as goalkeepers. Roin took first steps at the Memoriali football school formed by his own father.

His professional career began at the ascending club Zestaponi, which achieved a remarkable domestic success in the late 2000s and early 2010s. As a main shot-stopper, he was regarded as a key contributor to the progress that this team achieved during these several seasons. Kvaskhvadze bade farewell to Zestaponi in early 2014.

==== Torpedo Kutaisi ====
After a half season spent at Torpedo Kutaisi, he left for Cyprus only to come back to his home club a year later.

Twice in a row, in 2017 and 2018, Kvaskhvadze was named the best goalkeeper of Erovnuli Liga. Especially noteworthy was an injury-time penalty kick saved by Kvaskhadze in a crucial clash with Dinamo Tbilisi on 27 November 2017. As a result, Torpedo dramatically snatched the title, becoming the champions for the first time in fifteen years. Kvaskhvadze revealed that this circumstance made him feel the happiest man. Shortly afterwards, the team secured the Cup and Super cup titles as well.

Being the team captain now, Kvaskhvadze signed another two-year contract with the club in early 2019. But the entire year turned out turbulent for Torpedo with new financial woes, management crisis and mass exodus of players permanently rocking the club.

==== Dinamo and back to Torpedo ====
At the end of 2019 Kvaskhvadze joined Torpedo's bitter rivals Dinamo Tbilisi on a two-year deal. He played in all eighteen league matches next year, keeping eleven clean sheets. After Dinamo's another disastrous European campaign, on 21 July 2021 Kvaskhvadze left the club with 21 clean sheets in all competitions combined.

A few days later he returned to Torpedo once again. In 2022, the club clinched the national cup with Kvaskhvadze in goal for the final game. In April 2023, he was named the best goalkeeper of the initial nine rounds of the new season. The next month, head coach Kakha Chkhetiani, who likewise was on the 3rd spell with Torpedo, was sacked, followed by the departure of three key players, including Roin Kvaskhavdze.

==== Dinamo Batumi ====
Kvaskhvadze moved to Dinamo Batumi in early July 2023, a week before the latter joined a new European season. Although he did not take part in any of those two matches, Kvaskhvadze soon became a first-choice goalkeeper. As his new club secured the champion's title in late autumn, Kvaskhvadze claimed the national golden medals with the fourth Georgian team now.

=== International ===
Roin Kvaskhvadze has participated in qualifying rounds of the 2011 European U21 championship for a team which also featured Nika Kvekveskiri, Jano Ananidze and Tornike Okriashvili.

Kvaskhvadze made his debut at the national team in an opening match of the 2014 FIFA World Cup qualification campaign against Spain as a substitute in September 2012. He also took part in a friendly 1–0 winning game against the same opponents four years later. Overall, as No 2 choice behind Giorgi Loria, he played in eight matches for the team.

== Statistics ==
As of 8 October 2024

Club	Season	League			Cup		Continental		Other		Total	
Club	Season	Division	Apps	Goals	Apps	Goals	Apps	Goals	Apps	Goals	Apps	Goals
Zestaponi	2005/06	Umaglesi Liga	3	0	—	—	—	—	—		3	0
Zestaponi	2006/07	Umaglesi Liga	1	0	—		—		—		1	0
Zestaponi	2007/08	Umaglesi Liga	9	0	—		—		—		9	0
Zestaponi	2008/09	Umaglesi Liga	17	0	—		2	0	—		19	0
Zestaponi	2009/10	Umaglesi Liga	18	0	1	0	5	0	—		24	0
Zestaponi	2010/11	Umaglesi Liga	35	0	4	0	2	0	—		41	0
Zestaponi	2011/12	Umaglesi Liga	28	0	4	0	4	0	—		36	0
Zestaponi	2012/13	Umaglesi Liga	28	0	2	0	2	0	1 (Note: Appearances in Georgian Super Cup)	0	33	0
Zestaponi	2013/14	Umaglesi Liga	16	0	2	0	—		—		18	0
Zestaponi	Total		155	0	13	0	15	0	1	0	184	0
Torpedo Kutaisi	2013/14	Umaglesi Liga	14	0	2	0	—		—		16	0
Othellos	2014/15	Cypriot First Division	26	0	4	0	—		—		30	0
Pafos	2015/16	Cypriot First Division	15	0	—		—		—		15	0
Torpedo Kutaisi	2015/16	Umaglesi/Erovnuli Liga	11	0	—		—		—		11	0
Torpedo Kutaisi	2016	Umaglesi/Erovnuli Liga	13	0	4	0	—		1	0	18	0
Torpedo Kutaisi	2017	Umaglesi/Erovnuli Liga	36	0	4	—	—		—		40	0
Torpedo Kutaisi	2018	Umaglesi/Erovnuli Liga	32	0	5	0	8	0	1	0	46	0
Torpedo Kutaisi	2019	Umaglesi/Erovnuli Liga	19	0	14	0	2	0	1	0	36	0
Dinamo Tbilisi	2020	Erovnuli Liga	18	0	2	0	3	0	1	0	24	0
Dinamo Tbilisi	2021	Erovnuli Liga	17	0	4	0	1	0	1	0	23	0
Dinamo Tbilisi	Total		35	0	6	0	4	0	2	0	47	0
Torpedo Kutaisi	2021	Erovnuli Liga	5	0	—		—		—		5	0
Torpedo Kutaisi	2022	Erovnuli Liga	27	0	4	0	—		—		31	0
Torpedo Kutaisi	2023	Erovnuli Liga	6	0	—		—		—		6	0
Torpedo Kutaisi	Total		163	0	31	0	10	0	3	0	207	0
Dinamo Batumi	2023	Erovnuli Liga	16	0	1	0	—		—		17	0
Dinamo Batumi	2024	Erovnuli Liga	15	0	1	0	0	0	0	0	16	0
Dinamo Batumi	Total		31	0	2	0	0	0	0	0	33	0
Career total			425	0	56	0	29	0	6	0	516	0

== Honours ==
=== Club ===
Zestaponi

- Erovnuli Liga: 2
  - 2010–11, 2011–12
- Georgian Cup: 1
  - 2007–08
- Super Cup: 2
  - 2011, 2012

Torpedo Kutaisi

- Erovnuli Liga: 1
  - 2017
- Georgian Cup: 3
  - 2016, 2018, 2022
- Super Cup: 2
  - 2018, 2019

Dinamo Tbilisi

- Erovnuli Liga: 1
  - 2020
- Super Cup: 1
  - 2021

Dinamo Batumi

- Erovnuli Liga: 1
  - 2023

=== Individual ===
- Best Georgian goalkeeper: 2
  - 2017, 2018
