= Tornike Kapanadze =

Georgian footballer

Personal information
- Date of birth: 4 June 1992 (age 34)
- Place of birth: Kutaisi, Georgia
- Height: 1.68 m (5 ft 6 in)
- Position: Forward

Team information
- Current team: Guria
- Number: 9

Senior career*
Years	Team	Apps	(Gls)
2009–2011	Samtredia	2	(0)
2011–2013	Samgurali	43	(29)
2013–2014	Torpedo Kutaisi	17	(6)
2014–2015	Zestaponi	22	(6)
2014–2015	Samtredia	13	(4)
2015–2019	Torpedo Kutaisi	128	(47)
2020	Dinamo Tbilisi	10	(3)
2021–2022	Dila Gori	55	(19)
2023	Dinamo Batumi	25	(2)
2024	Sioni	35	(12)
2025	Samtredia	20	(2)
2026–	Guria	16	(11)
- * Club domestic league appearances and goals as of 3 November 2026

Tornike Kapanadze (Georgian: თორნიკე კაპანაძე; born 4 June 1992), nicknamed Elva, is a Georgian professional footballer who plays as a forward for Liga 3 club Guria.

Kapanadze has won seven trophies in all three domestic competitions and received individual recognition with different clubs.

== Career ==
Kapanadze started his professional career at Samtredia in 2009, although his first achievement came with Samgurali in 2012–13, when he became the Pirveli Liga top goalscorer with 27 goals.

In 2013, Kanapadze netted his first two European goals in Torpedo Kutaisi's 3–3 draw against Žilina.

Early next year he moved to fellow Imeretian club Zestaponi.

Kapanadze enjoyed a long-time prolific period at his hometown team Torpedo Kutaisi. Apart from winning the league and the Cup, twice in a row he became the top goalscorer. In its inaugural 2017 year, the Erovnuli Liga named Kapanadze in Team of the Season. Following the 2018 season, he received the Player of the Season, Best Forward and Goal of the Year awards from the club. His scissor kick goal scored against Chikhura Sachkhere on 21 November 2018 was also widely recognized.

Kapanadze spent the 2020 season at Dinamo Tbilisi and the next year joined Dila Gori where he became the top scorer for two consecutive seasons.

In January 2023, Dinamo Batumi announced the signing of contract with Kapanadze. At the end of this season, he lifted the champion's trophy for the third time in his career.

As his contract expired in January 2024, the striker moved to Liga 2 side Sioni. Having played in 38 games across all competitions, he finished as the team's topscorer with 12 goals.

In early February 2025, Kapanadze signed for Samtredia to start his third stint.

A year later, he moved to Liga 3 side Guria.

== Statistics ==
As of match played 16 October 2026

Appearances and goals by club, season and competition
Club	Season	League			National Cup		Continental		Other		Total	
Club	Season	Division	Apps	Goals	Apps	Goals	Apps	Goals	Apps	Goals	Apps	Goals
Samtredia	2009–10	Umaglesi Liga	1	0	–		–		–		1	0
Samtredia	2010–11	Umaglesi Liga	1	0	–		–		–		1	0
Samtredia	2014–15	Umaglesi Liga	13	4	4	3	–		–		17	7
Samgurali	2011–12	Pirveli Liga	13	2	–		–		–		13	2
Samgurali	2012–13	Pirveli Liga	30	27	2	1	–		–		32	28
Samgurali	Total		43	29	2	1	0	0	0	0	45	30
Torpedo Kutaisi	2011–12	Umaglesi/ Erovnuli Liga	–		1	0	–		–		1	0
Torpedo Kutaisi	2013–14	Umaglesi/ Erovnuli Liga	17	6	2	0	2 (Note: Appearances in UEFA Europa League)	2	–		21	8
Torpedo Kutaisi	2015–16	Umaglesi/ Erovnuli Liga	25	9	3	3	–		–		28	12
Torpedo Kutaisi	2016	Umaglesi/ Erovnuli Liga	14	4	5	1	–		–		19	5
Torpedo Kutaisi	2017	Umaglesi/ Erovnuli Liga	34	14	2	0	2	0	1 (Note: Appearances in Georgian Super Cup)	0	39	14
Torpedo Kutaisi	2018	Umaglesi/ Erovnuli Liga	27	14	5	4	6 (Note: Five appearances in UEFA Europa League and one appearance in Champions League)	3	1	0	39	21
Torpedo Kutaisi	2019	Umaglesi/ Erovnuli Liga	28	6	3	2	2	0	1	0	34	8
Torpedo Kutaisi	Total		145	53	21	10	12	5	3	0	181	68
Zestaponi	2013–14	Umaglesi Liga	7	3	–		–		–		7	3
Zestaponi	2014–15	Umaglesi Liga	15	3	1	0	–		–		16	3
Zestaponi	Total		22	6	1	0	0	0	0	0	23	6
Dinamo Tbilisi	2020	Erovnuli Liga	10	3	1	0	2 (Note: One appearance in UEFA Europa League and one appearance in Champions League)	0	–		13	3
Dila	2021	Erovnuli Liga	27	10	2	0	2	0	–		31	10
Dila	2022	Erovnuli Liga	28	9	3	1	1	0	–		32	10
Dila	Total		55	19	5	1	3	0	0	0	63	20
Dinamo Batumi	2023	Erovnuli Liga	25	2	3	1	2	1	2	0	32	4
Sioni	2024	Erovnuli Liga 2	35	12	1	0	–		2 (Note: Appearances in Erovnuli Liga playoffs)	0	38	12
Samtredia	2025	Erovnuli Liga 2	20	2	1	0	–		–		21	2
Samtredia	Total		35	6	5	3	0	0	0	0	40	9
Guria	2026	Liga 3	16	11	2	0	–		–		18	11
Career total			386	142	41	16	19	6	7	0	453	164

== Honours ==
=== Team ===
Erovnuli Liga (3): 2017, 2020, 2023

Georgian Cup (2): 2016, 2018

Georgian Super Cup (2): 2018, 2019

=== Individual ===
Pirveli Liga topscorer: 2012–13

Erovnuli Liga Team of the Season: 2017
