= Paata Gudushauri =

Georgian footballer

Paata Gudushauri პაატა ღუდუშაური
Personal information
- Date of birth: 17 June 1997 (age 29)
- Place of birth: Tbilisi, Georgia
- Height: 1.78 m (5 ft 10 in)
- Position: Midfielder

Team information
- Current team: Iberia 1999
- Number: 7

Youth career
- WIT Georgia

Senior career*
Years	Team	Apps	(Gls)
2015–2016	WIT Georgia-2	13	(2)
2015–2019	WIT Georgia	110	(24)
2021–2022	Dila	51	(6)
2022–2024	Dinamo Batumi	59	(17)
2024	Bnei Sakhnin	3	(0)
2025	Torpedo Kutaisi	33	(6)
2026–	Iberia 1999	11	(3)
- * Club domestic league appearances and goals as of 9 May 2026

Paata Gudushauri (Georgian: პაატა ღუდუშაური; born 17 June 1997) is a Georgian professional footballer who plays for Iberia 1999 as an attacking midfielder.

Known for his speed and dribbling ability, Gudushauri has won the Georgian top league with Dinamo Batumi. Individually, Gudushauri was named as most prolific player of the 2023 season and included in Erovnuli Liga Team of the Season.

== Career ==
Being a product of WIT Georgia's academy, Paata Gudushauri spent five seasons at this club, initially in the junior team, before making a debut in a professional league.

In 2018, he became the topscorer of his club by netting 10 goals. At the end of the season, which saw WIT Georgia to climb back to the top division, the club recognized Gudushauri as Player of the Year. On 11 March 2019, he scored his first top-league goal in a 1–1 draw against Chikhura.

As the team failed to avoid relegation this season, Gudushauri joined Dila Gori the next year, plagued by COVID-19. But due to his suspension resulting from some disciplinary issues, he resumed to play official matches in early 2021.

In July 2021, Gudushauri made his first appearance in Dila's European campaign against Žilina, who claimed victory in a two-legged tie.

In the summer of 2022, he signed a contract with Dinamo Batumi until December 2024.

Gudushauri had a memorable year in 2023. Apart from winning the league with Dinamo for the first time, he received several individual awards. In early October, the Erovnuli Liga named Gudushauri as the best player of the 3rd phase which implied nine matches between rounds 19 and 28. During this period, he netted five times and made six assists. Overall, with a tally of 12 goals and 13 assists Gudushauri was recognized as the most valuable player of this season and subsequently included in Team of the Season at an annual awards ceremony held on 4 December 2023.

On 31 July 2024, Israeli Premier League club Bnei Sakhnin announced the signing of a contract with Gudushauri. However, after having appeared for the team in six matches, the player opted to leave two months later due to safety reasons resulting from the ongoing combat activities with regard to Lebanon.

On 7 November 2024, Erovnuli Liga side Torpedo Kutaisi announced the signing of Gudushauri. Since according to existing regulations, a footballer is not allowed to play for more than two clubs during one season, the contract entered into force on 1 January 2025.

In January 2026, Gudushauri signed for the reigning league champions Iberia 1999.

== Statistics ==
As of match played 6 May 2026

Appearances and goals by club, season and competition
Club	Season	League			National cup		Continental		Other		Total	
Club	Season	Division	Apps	Goals	Apps	Goals	Apps	Goals	Apps	Goals	Apps	Goals
WIT Georgia-2	2015–16	Meore Liga	13	2	–		–		–		13	2
WIT Georgia	2015–16	Pirveli Liga	19	3	3	0	–		–		22	3
WIT Georgia	2016	Pirveli Liga	15	5	1	0	–		–		16	5
WIT Georgia	2017	Erovnuli Liga 2	31	5	1	1	–		–		32	6
WIT Georgia	2018	Erovnuli Liga 2	32	10	3	1	–		2 (Note: Appearance in Erovnuli Liga playoffs)	0	37	11
WIT Georgia	2019	Erovnuli Liga	13	1	1	0	–		–		14	1
WIT Georgia	Total		123	26	9	2	0	0	2	0	134	28
Dila	2021	Erovnuli Liga	34	4	1	0	2 (Note: Appearances in UEFA Europa Conference League qualifiers)	0	–		37	4
Dila	2022	Erovnuli Liga	17	2	–		2 (Note: Appearances in UEFA Europa Conference League qualifiers)	0	–		19	2
Dila	Total		51	6	1	0	4	0	0	0	56	6
Dinamo Batumi	2022	Erovnuli Liga	11	1	–		–		–		11	1
Dinamo Batumi	2023	Erovnuli Liga	32	12	3	0	2 (Note: Appearances in UEFA Europa Conference League qualifiers)	0	2 (Note: Appearances in Georgian Super Cup)	0	39	12
Dinamo Batumi	2024	Erovnuli Liga	16	4	–		4 (Note: Two appearances in UEFA Champions League qualifiers and two appearances in UEFA Conference League qualifiers)	0	2	2	22	6
Dinamo Batumi	Total		59	17	3	0	6	0	4	2	72	19
Bnei Sakhnin	2024–25	Israeli Premier League	3	0	3	0	–		–		6	0
Bnei Sakhnin	Total		3	0	3	0	0	0	0	0	6	0
Torpedo	2025	Erovnuli Liga	33	6	0	0	4 (Note: Appearances in UEFA Conference League qualifiers)	0	1	0	38	6
Iberia 1999	2026	Erovnuli Liga	11	3	0	0	0	0	0	0	11	3
Career total			266	54	16	2	14	0	7	2	303	58

== Honours ==
=== Club ===
Dinamo Batumi

- Erovnuli Liga Winner: 2023
- Erovnuli Liga Runner-up: 2022

=== Individual ===
- Erovnuli Liga Team of the Year: 2023
