= Irakli Bidzinashvili =

Georgian footballer (born 1997)

Personal information
- Date of birth: 27 February 1997 (age 29)
- Place of birth: Georgia
- Height: 1.68 m (5 ft 6 in)
- Position: Midfielder

Team information
- Current team: Samgurali

Senior career*
Years	Team	Apps	(Gls)
2013–2018	Saburtalo	84	(9)
2018–2019	Noah	5	(0)
2019	Jelgava	20	(2)
2020–2021	Dila	32	(7)
2022–2023	Dinamo Batumi	59	(14)
2024	Zhenis	10	(1)
2024–2025	Torpedo Kutaisi	27	(1)
2026	Iberia 1999	12	(0)
2026–	Samgurali	0	(0)

International career
2013	Georgia U17	2	(0)
2015–2016	Georgia U19	6	(1)
- * Club domestic league appearances and goals as of 10 July 2026

Irakli Bidzinashvili (Georgian: ირაკლი ბიძინაშვილი; born 27 February 1997) is a Georgian professional footballer who plays as a midfielder for Erovnuli Liga club Samgurali.

Bidzinashvili has won the top Georgian league.

== Career ==
A product of Saburtalo's academy, Bidzinashvili started his professional career at this club at the age of 16. On 21 September 2013, he came off the bench in Saburtalo's second-division game against STU. On 24 March 2014, he contributed with his first senior career goal to a 4–1 over Samgurali.

The next year Saburtalo secured promotion to the Umaglesi Liga with Bidzinashvili taking part in 25 league games. His first top-division goal came in a dramatic 2–2 draw against Samtredia, in which Bidzinashvili scored a late leveller.

Having played 84 games for Saburtalo, Bidzinashvili left the team in 2017. Following a short-time spell at Armenian club Noah, he joined Latvian side Jelgava.

In 2020, Bidzinashvili returned to Georgia and joined Dila Gori, where twice in a row he won the bronze medals of the Erovnuli Liga. In 2021, apart from making a debut in UEFA Europa Conference League qualifiers with two appearances, Bidzinashvili became a key player who among two other footballers was nominated as the best midfielder. Although ultimately not selected, Bidzinashvili featured in Team of the Year.

After this season he signed with crowned champions Dinamo Batumi. In his first two years, Bidzinashvili became a regular player for this title-chasing club by taking part in 59 league games. In 2023, he won his first top title with Dinamo.

On 31 January 2024, Kazakhstan Premier League club Zhenis announced the signing of Bidzinashvili. His stint there lasted around five months though, as the sides parted ways in the summer break and the player moved to Torpedo Kutaisi.

On 21 January 2026, Saburtalo, now renamed as Iberia 1999, announced the return of Bidzinashvili to the club after an eight-year pause. Six months later, he moved to Samgurali.

== Statistics ==
As of match played 27 June 2026

Appearances and goals by club, season and competition
Club	Season	League			National Cup		Continental		Other		Total	
Club	Season	Division	Apps	Goals	Apps	Goals	Apps	Goals	Apps	Goals	Apps	Goals
Saburtalo	2013–14	Pirveli Liga	15	2	–		–		–		15	2
Saburtalo	2014–15	Pirveli Liga	25	3	2	0	–		–		27	3
Saburtalo	2015–16	Erovnuli Liga	25	0	2	0	2 (Note: Appearances in UEFA Youth League)	0	–		29	0
Saburtalo	2016	Erovnuli Liga	2	1	–		–		–		2	1
Saburtalo	2017	Erovnuli Liga	17	3	1	0	–		–		18	3
Saburtalo	2018	Erovnuli Liga	0	0	1	0	–		–		1	0
Saburtalo	Total		84	9	6	0	2	0	0	0	92	9
Noah	2019	Armenian Premier League	5	0	2	0	–		–		7	0
Jedgava	2019	Virsliga	20	2	2	1	–		–		22	3
Dila	2020	Erovnuli Liga	5	0	2	1	–		–		7	1
Dila	2021	Erovnuli Liga	27	7	2	0	2 (Note: Appearances in UEFA Europa Conference League)	0	–		31	7
Dila	Total		32	7	4	1	2	0	0	0	38	8
Dinamo Batumi	2022	Erovnuli Liga	27	7	1	0	4 (Note: 2 appearances in UEFA Europa Conference League and 2 appearances in UEFA Champions League)	0	1 (Note: Appearances in Georgian Super Cup)	0	33	7
Dinamo Batumi	2023	Erovnuli Liga	32	7	3	0	2	0	2	0	39	7
Dinamo Batumi	Total		59	14	4	0	6	0	3	0	72	14
Zhenis	2024	KPL	10	1	–		–		–		10	1
Torpedo Kutaisi	2024	Erovnuli Liga	12	1	1	0	3 (Note: Appearances in UEFA Conference League)	0	–		16	1
Torpedo Kutaisi	2025	Erovnuli Liga	15	0	–		4	1	2 (Note: Appearances in Georgian Super Cup)	0	21	1
Torpedo Kutaisi	Total		27	1	1	0	7	1	2	0	37	2
Iberia 1999	2026	Erovnuli Liga	12	0	–		–		1	0	13	1
Career total			249	34	19	2	15	1	8	0	291	38

== Honours ==
=== Team ===
Dinamo Batumi

Erovnuli Liga (1): 2023

=== Individual ===
Erovnuli Liga Team of the Year (1): 2021
