= Chankotadze =

Chankotadze is a Georgian surname (Georgian: ჭანკოტაძე). Notable people with the surname include:

- Devi Chankotadze (born 1961), Georgian military person
- Giorgi Chankotadze (born 1977), Georgian footballer
