= Giorgi Rekhviashvili =

Georgian footballer

Personal information
- Date of birth: 1 February 1988 (age 38)
- Place of birth: Rustavi, Georgia
- Height: 1.85 m (6 ft 1 in)
- Position: Centre back

Team information
- Current team: Gonio
- Number: 23

Youth career
- 2006–2008: Olimpi Rustavi

Senior career*
Years	Team	Apps	(Gls)
2008–2011	Olimpi Rustavi	69	(6)
2008	→ Mglebi (loan)	12	(2)
2011–2014	Dinamo Tbilisi	55	(0)
2013	→ Chikhura (loan)	24	(3)
2014	Chikhura	0	(0)
2014–2015	Boluspor	6	(0)
2015–2016	Dinamo Tbilisi	0	(0)
2016–2017	Chikhura	21	(1)
2017	Locomotive	32	(3)
2018–2019	Saburtalo	32	(2)
2019	Levadiakos	10	(0)
2019	Saburtalo	14	(1)
2020	Ventspils	20	(0)
2021	Shukura	25	(0)
2022–2023	Dinamo Batumi	23	(0)
2024	Sioni	31	(0)
2025	Gagra	12	(0)
2026–	Gonio	6	(1)

International career^{‡}
2017–	Georgia	1	(0)
- * Club domestic league appearances and goals as of 28 April 2026 ‡ National team caps and goals as of 17 March 2017

Giorgi Rekhviashvili (Georgian: გიორგი რეხვიაშვილი; born 1 February 1988) is a Georgian football player who plays for Liga 3 club Gonio.

Apart from being the four-time winner of the Georgian top division with four different teams, he has also won the national cup and Super Cup six times in total. Individually, Rekhviashvili has been twice in a row named in Team of the Season.

== Club career ==
Rekhviashvili began his career in 2008 at Olimpi Rustavi, who were regarded as one of the strongest teams at the time. Namely, during a four-year period between 2008 and 2013 the club was among the top three and once secured the league title. Rekhviashvili was a regular player, taking part in 59 league matches in the two seasons. He scored his first European goal in a 1–1 home draw against Aktobe on 21 July 2010.

In 2011, he signed a contract with Dinamo Tbilisi and lifted four titles in next three years. Rekhviashvili left the club in June 2014.

Twice, in 2017 and 2018, Rekhviashvili was selected in Erovnuli Liga Team of the Season.

Outside of Georgia, Turkish club Boluspor was the first club he joined in 2014 after an impressive performance in Europa League with Chikhura. Later he also spent two seasons combined in Latvia and Greece.

== International ==
He made his debut for the Georgia national football team on 23 January 2017 in a friendly against Uzbekistan.

== Statistics ==
Data available from 2009

As of match played 16 April 2026

Appearances and goals by club, season and competition
Club	Season	League			National cup		Continental		Other		Total	
Club	Season	Division	Apps	Goals	Apps	Goals	Apps	Goals	Apps	Goals	Apps	Goals
Olimpi	2009/10	Umaglesi Liga	27	2	1	0	1 (Note: Appearances in Champions League qualifiers)	0	–		29	2
Olimpi	2010/11	Umaglesi Liga	32	2	3	0	2 (Note: Appearances in Europa League qualifiers)	1	1 (Note: Appearances in Super Cup)	0	38	3
Olimpi	Total		59	4	4	0	3	1	1	0	67	5
Dinamo Tbilisi	2011/12	Umaglesi Liga	25	0	2	0	7	0	–		34	0
Dinamo Tbilisi	2012/13	Umaglesi Liga	17	0	2	0	–		–		19	0
Dinamo Tbilisi	2013/14	Umaglesi Liga	11	0	4	1	–		–		15	1
Dinamo Tbilisi	Total		53	0	8	1	7	0	0	0	68	1
Dinamo Tbilisi B	2013/14	Pirveli Liga	1	0	–		–		–		1	0
Dinamo Tbilisi B	2013/14	Pirveli Liga	1	0	–		–		–		1	0
Dinamo Tbilisi B	Total		2	0	0	0	0	0	0	0	2	0
Chikhura	2012/13 (loan)	Umaglesi Liga	7	1	4	2	–		1	0	12	3
Chikhura	2013–14	Umaglesi Liga	17	2	2	1	4	1	–		23	4
Chikhura	2014/15	Umaglesi Liga	–		–		6	1	–		6	1
Chikhura	2015/16	Umaglesi Liga	9	1	2	0	–		–		11	1
Chikhura	2016	Umaglesi Liga	12	0	3	0	2	0	–		17	0
Chikhura	Total		45	4	11	3	12	2	1	0	69	9
Boluspor	2014/15	1.Lig	6	0	–		–		–		6	0
Locomotive	2017	Erovnuli Liga	32	3	–		–		–		32	3
Saburtalo	2018	Erovnuli Liga	32	2	–		–		–		32	2
Saburtalo	2019	Erovnuli Liga	14	1	4	0	4+2	0	–		24	1
Saburtalo	Total		46	3	4	0	6	0	0	0	56	3
Levadiakos	2018/19	Super League	10	0	–		–		–		10	0
Ventspils	2020	Virsliga	20	0	3	0	2	0	–		25	0
Shukura	2021	Erovnuli Liga	25	0	3	0	–		1 (Note: Appearances in Erovnuli Liga playoffs)	0	29	0
Dinamo Batumi	2022	Erovnuli Liga	13	0	1	0	2+1 (Note: Appearances in Conference League qualifiers)	0	–		17	0
Dinamo Batumi	2023	Erovnuli Liga	10	0	2	0	1	0	–		13	0
Dinamo Batumi	Total		23	0	3	0	4	0	0	0	30	0
Sioni	2024	Erovnuli Liga 2	31	0	1	0	–		2	1	34	0
Gagra	2025	Erovnuli Liga	12	0	–		–		–		12	0
Gonio	2026	Liga 3	6	1	–		–		–		6	1
Career total			360	15	37	4	34	3	5	1	446	22

== Honours ==
=== Team ===
- Erovnuli Liga winner (4): 2009–10, 2013–14, 2018, 2023
- David Kipiani Cup winner (2): 2013–14, 2019
- Super Cup winner (4): 2010–11, 2013–14, 2015–16, 2022

=== Individual ===
- Erovnuli Liga Team of the Season (2): 2017, 2018
