= Oleksandr Azatskyi =

Ukrainian footballer (born 1994)

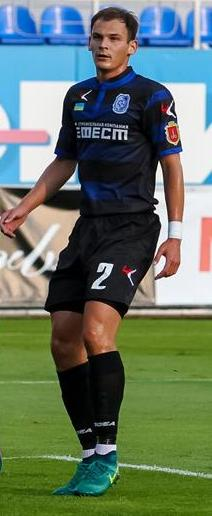
- Azatskyi with Chornomorets Odesa in 2017

Personal information
- Full name: Oleksandr Oleksandrovych Azatskyi
- Date of birth: 13 January 1994 (age 32)
- Place of birth: Kharkiv, Ukraine
- Height: 1.90 m (6 ft 3 in)
- Position: Centre-back

Team information
- Current team: Warta Poznań
- Number: 3

Youth career
- 2007–2011: Metalist Kharkiv

Senior career*
| Years | Team | Apps | (Gls) |
| 2011–2014 | Metalist Kharkiv | 1 | (0) |
| 2014–2016 | Dynamo Kyiv | 0 | (0) |
| 2014 | →Dynamo-2 Kyiv | 9 | (0) |
| 2016–2017 | Chornomorets Odesa | 33 | (1) |
| 2017–2020 | Baník Ostrava | 14 | (0) |
| 2018–2019 | → Torpedo Kutaisi (loan) | 35 | (2) |
| 2019–2020 | → Fastav Zlín (loan) | 14 | (0) |
| 2021–2022 | Dinamo Batumi | 58 | (1) |
| 2023–2025 | Arka Gdynia | 38 | (2) |
| 2025–2026 | Polonia Bytom | 20 | (0) |
| 2026– | Warta Poznań | 0 | (0) |

International career
| 2012–2013 | Ukraine U19 | 9 | (1) |
| 2014 | Ukraine U20 | 1 | (0) |
| 2014–2015 | Ukraine U21 | 13 | (0) |
- * Club domestic league appearances and goals as of 08:49, 27 May 2026 (UTC)

Oleksandr Oleksandrovych Azatskyi (Ukrainian: Олександр Олександрович Азацький; born 13 January 1994) is a Ukrainian professional footballer who plays as a centre-back for I liga club Warta Poznań.

== Career ==
Azatskyi is the product of the Metalist Kharkiv Youth school system. He made his debut for Metalist in a match against Vorskla Poltava on 10 May 2012 in Ukrainian Premier League.

== Career statistics ==
As of match played 24 May 2026

Appearances and goals by club, season and competition
| Club | Season | League | | | National cup (Note: Includes Ukrainian Cup, Czech Cup, Georgian Cup, Polish Cup) | | Europe | | Other | | Total | |
| Club | Season | Division | Apps | Goals | Apps | Goals | Apps | Goals | Apps | Goals | Apps | Goals |
|---|---|---|---|---|---|---|---|---|---|---|---|---|
| Metalist Kharkiv | 2011–12 | Ukrainian Premier League | 0 | 0 | 0 | 0 | 0 | 0 | — | | 0 | 0 |
| Metalist Kharkiv | 2013–14 | Ukrainian Premier League | 1 | 0 | 0 | 0 | — | | — | | 1 | 0 |
| Metalist Kharkiv | Total | | 1 | 0 | 0 | 0 | 0 | 0 | — | | 1 | 0 |
| Dynamo-2 Kyiv | 2014–15 | Ukrainian First League | 9 | 0 | 0 | 0 | — | | — | | 9 | 0 |
| Chornomorets Odesa | 2015–16 | Ukrainian Premier League | 8 | 1 | 0 | 0 | — | | — | | 8 | 1 |
| Chornomorets Odesa | 2016–17 | Ukrainian Premier League | 23 | 0 | 1 | 0 | — | | — | | 24 | 0 |
| Chornomorets Odesa | 2017–18 | Ukrainian Premier League | 2 | 0 | 0 | 0 | — | | — | | 2 | 0 |
| Chornomorets Odesa | Total | | 33 | 1 | 1 | 0 | — | | — | | 34 | 1 |
| Baník Ostrava | 2017–18 | Czech First League | 11 | 0 | 3 | 1 | — | | — | | 14 | 1 |
| Baník Ostrava | 2020–21 | Czech First League | 3 | 0 | 0 | 0 | — | | — | | 3 | 0 |
| Baník Ostrava | Total | | 14 | 0 | 3 | 1 | — | | — | | 17 | 1 |
| Torpedo Kutaisi (loan) | 2018 | Erovnuli Liga | 18 | 0 | 4 | 1 | 8 (Note: Two appearances in UEFA Champions League, six appearances and one goal in UEFA Europa League) | 1 | — | | 30 | 1 |
| Torpedo Kutaisi (loan) | 2019 | Erovnuli Liga | 17 | 2 | 2 | 0 | — | | 1 (Note: Appearance in Georgian Super Cup) | 0 | 20 | 2 |
| Torpedo Kutaisi (loan) | Total | | 35 | 2 | 6 | 1 | 8 | 1 | 1 | 0 | 50 | 4 |
| Fastav Zlín (loan) | 2019–20 | Czech First League | 14 | 0 | 1 | 0 | — | | — | | 15 | 0 |
| Dinamo Batumi | 2021 | Erovnuli Liga | 29 | 1 | 2 | 0 | 5 (Note: Appearances in UEFA Europa Conference League) | 0 | — | | 36 | 1 |
| Dinamo Batumi | 2022 | Erovnuli Liga | 29 | 0 | 1 | 0 | 3 (Note: Two appearances in UEFA Champions League, one appearance in UEFA Europa Conference League) | 0 | 1 | 0 | 34 | 0 |
| Dinamo Batumi | Total | | 58 | 1 | 3 | 0 | 8 | 0 | 1 | 0 | 70 | 1 |
| Arka Gdynia | 2022–23 | I liga | 16 | 1 | — | | — | | — | | 16 | 1 |
| Arka Gdynia | 2023–24 | I liga | 15 | 0 | 1 | 0 | — | | 2 (Note: Appearances in I liga promotion play-offs) | 0 | 18 | 0 |
| Arka Gdynia | 2024–25 | I liga | 5 | 1 | 0 | 0 | — | | — | | 5 | 1 |
| Arka Gdynia | Total | | 36 | 2 | 1 | 0 | — | | 2 | 0 | 39 | 2 |
| Polonia Bytom | 2025–26 | I liga | 20 | 0 | 0 | 0 | — | | — | | 20 | 0 |
| Warta Poznań | 2026–27 | I liga | 0 | 0 | 0 | 0 | — | | — | | 0 | 0 |
| Career total | | | 220 | 6 | 15 | 2 | 16 | 1 | 4 | 0 | 255 | 9 |

== Honours ==
Torpedo Kutaisi

- Georgian Cup: 2018
- Georgian Super Cup: 2019

Dinamo Batumi

- Erovnuli Liga: 2021
- Georgian Super Cup: 2022

Arka Gdynia

- I liga: 2024–25
