= Vladimer Mamuchashvili =

Georgian footballer (born 1997)

Personal information
- Date of birth: 29 August 1997 (age 29)
- Height: 1.75 m (5 ft 9 in)
- Position: Midfielder

Team information
- Current team: Torpedo Kutaisi
- Number: 7

Youth career
- 2004–2012: Saburtalo

Senior career*
Years	Team	Apps	(Gls)
2013–2018	Saburtalo	125	(5)
2018–2024	Dinamo Batumi	191	(41)
2024–2025	Sheriff	20	(8)
2025–	Torpedo Kutaisi	39	(6)

International career^{‡}
2014	Georgia U17	5	(1)
2015–2018	Georgia U19	5	(0)
2016–2018	Georgia U21	4	(0)
2021–	Georgia	15	(0)
- * Club domestic league appearances and goals as of 1 September 2026 ‡ National team caps and goals as of 20:40, 11 October 2025 (UTC)

Vladimer "Lado" Mamuchashvili (Georgian: ვლადიმერ მამუჩაშვილი; born 29 August 1997) is a Georgian professional footballer who plays as a midfielder for Erovnuli Liga club Torpedo Kutaisi and the Georgia national team.

He has won the Erovnuli Liga and Georgian Super Cup titles with Dinamo Batumi.

== Career ==
=== Club ===
Mamuchashvili entered the Saburtalo football school at age 7. He made a debut for the senior team in a 4–1 win against Kolkheti Khobi on 31 August 2013 in the 2nd division. Four years later, Mamuchashvili scored his first Erovnuli Liga goal in a 4–1 away victory over Dinamo Tbilisi.

The next summer he ended his fourteen-year tenure at Saburtalo and moved to Liga 2 side Dinamo Batumi on a two-year deal, later extended for another two years.

Mamuchashvili became a key player at the new club. In the first season, he featured in all remaining 19 games and helped the team to seal an immediate promotion back to the top tier. In 2021, he netted in each of the three rounds of the 2021–22 UEFA Europa Conference League campaign. Later the same year, Dinamo Batumi won the champion's title with Mamuchashvili taking part in all games, except for one, and scoring nine goals.

In 2023, Mamuchashvili contributed with 12 goals to Dinamo's another league triumph. At the end of the year, he received an individual recognition by being named in Team of the Season.

Mamuchashvili made 24 appearances in all competitions the next year, becoming the team's top scorer with eight goals by early August. In this summer break, the player opted to leave Dinamo after a seven-year-long spell.

On 13 August 2024, Moldovan club Sheriff Tiraspol announced signing Mamuchashvili as a free agent. On 29 September, he netted a hat-trick in a 3–1 win over Dacia. In late December 2024, Mamuchashvili was considered the second-highest valued player of the Moldovan Super League. With Sheriff claiming the national cup in May 2025, Mamuchashvili was named by Sofascore as Player of the Season and included in Team of the Season with the highest point.

On 25 June 2025, Mamuchashvili left Sheriff to sign for Torpedo Kutaisi.

=== International ===
Mamuchashvili represented Georgia in all youth national teams. He made a debut for the senior team on 5 September 2021 in a World Cup qualifier against Spain, a 0–4 away loss. He started the game and played the whole match.

== Statistics ==
As of match played 6 December 2025

Appearances and goals by club, season and competition
Club	Season	League			National Cup		Continental		Other		Total	
Club	Season	Division	Apps	Goals	Apps	Goals	Apps	Goals	Apps	Goals	Apps	Goals
Saburtalo	2013/14	Pirveli Liga	20	1	0	0	0	0	0	0	20	1
Saburtalo	2014/15	Pirveli Liga	31	2	1	0	0	0	0	0	32	2
Saburtalo	2015/16	Umaglesi Liga	22	0	2	0	2 (Note: Appearances in UEFA Youth League)	0	0	0	26	0
Saburtalo	2016	Umaglesi Liga	10	0	1	0	0	0	0	0	11	0
Saburtalo	2017	Erovnuli Liga	35	2	1	0	0	0	0	0	36	2
Saburtalo	2018	Erovnuli Liga	7	0	1	0	0	0	0	0	8	0
Saburtalo	Total		125	5	6	0	2	0	0	0	133	5
Dinamo Batumi	2018	Erovnuli Liga 2	19	3	0	0	0	0	0	0	19	3
Dinamo Batumi	2019	Erovnuli Liga	34	5	1	0	0	0	0	0	35	5
Dinamo Batumi	2020	Erovnuli Liga	18	0	1	0	1 (Note: Appearance in UEFA Europa League)	0	0	0	20	0
Dinamo Batumi	2021	Erovnuli Liga	35	9	4	3	6 (Note: Appearances in UEFA Conference League)	3	0	0	45	15
Dinamo Batumi	2022	Erovnuli Liga	34	7	1	0	4 (Note: 2 appearances in UEFA Champions League and 2 appearances in Conference League)	0	1 (Note: Appearances in Georgian Super Cup)	0	40	7
Dinamo Batumi	2023	Erovnuli Liga	33	12	3	1	2 (Note: Appearances in UEFA Conference League)	0	2	0	40	13
Dinamo Batumi	2024	Erovnuli Liga	18	5	0	0	4	2	2	1	24	8
Dinamo Batumi	Total		191	41	10	4	17	5	5	1	223	51
Sheriff	2024/25	Moldovan Super Liga	19	6	4	2	0	0	0	0	23	8
Sheriff	2025/26	Moldovan Super Liga	1	2	0	0	0	0	0	0	1	2
Sheriff	Total		20	8	4	2	0	0	0	0	24	10
Torpedo	2025	Erovnuli Liga	18	2	1	1	4	0	2	0	25	3
Career total			354	56	21	7	23	5	7	1	405	69

== Honours ==
Saburtalo

- Erovnuli Liga 2: 2014–15

Dinamo Batumi

- Erovnuli Liga: 2021, 2023
- Georgian Super Cup: 2022
- Erovnuli Liga 2: 2018

Sheriff

- Moldovan Cup: 2024–25

Individual

- Erovnuli Liga Team of the Year: 2023
