= Mamuka Kobakhidze =

Georgian footballer

Personal information
- Date of birth: 23 August 1992 (age 34)
- Place of birth: Tbilisi, Georgia
- Height: 1.90 m (6 ft 3 in)
- Position: Centre back

Team information
- Current team: Dinamo Batumi
- Number: 23

Youth career
- 2008–2009: Zestaponi

Senior career*
Years	Team	Apps	(Gls)
2009–2013	Zestaponi	70	(2)
2013	→ Alania Vladikavkaz (loan)	0	(0)
2013–2014	Dila Gori	22	(0)
2014–2017	Rubin Kazan	4	(0)
2015–2016	→ Mordovia Saransk (loan)	1	(0)
2016–2017	→ Neftekhimik (loan)	21	(0)
2017	Locomotive Tbilisi	15	(1)
2018	Rustavi	15	(2)
2018–2019	Torpedo Kutaisi	33	(1)
2019–	Dinamo Batumi	200	(11)

International career^{‡}
2007–2008	Georgia U-16	2	(0)
2008–2009	Georgia U-17	4	(0)
2009–2010	Georgia U-19	6	(0)
2011–2014	Georgia U-21	16	(2)
2020–	Georgia	5	(0)
- * Club domestic league appearances and goals as of 12 July 2026 ‡ National team caps and goals as of 1 May 2023

Mamuka Kobakhidze (Georgian: მამუკა კობახიძე; born 23 August 1992) is a Georgian professional football player. Being a member of Dinamo Batumi since 2019, he captains the team.

Kobakhidze has played for national youth teams and secured Georgian champion's title three times, also won the national Cup and Super Cup.

== Club career ==
Kobakhidze started his career at Zestaponi. During his four-year tenure there Kobakhidze twice won the Georgian league title. In February 2014, he moved to Dila Gori.

He made his debut in the Russian Premier League on 22 November 2014 for FC Rubin Kazan in a game against FC Ural Sverdlovsk Oblast.

On 4 August 2017, he returned to Georgia, signing with FC Locomotive Tbilisi. The next summer Kobakhidze joined Torpedo Kutaisi in a move that proved to be rewarding. He was named the best defender of the season and included in the symbolic team of Erovnuli Liga.

Kobakhidze was among those players who left Torpedo en masse in June 2019 following a severe financial crisis. He chose to sign a contract with Dinamo Batumi, who had returned to the top division following the previous season. At an annual ceremony held by Georgian Football Federation, Kobakhidze won a nomination for the best defender of the league again. He was also selected for Team of the Year. With the same awards received the next season, Kobakhidze achieved a wide recognition for three consecutive seasons.

In 2021, Dinamo Batumi won the top division for the first time in their history. As the team captain, Kobakhidze lifted the trophy for the third time now. When the team of the season was announced, their seven players, including Kobakhidze, were named among the best eleven.

Two years later, Kobakhidze won one more league title. His individual performance was also recognized as he was named in the Team of the Year for the fifth time now. He was also announced Defender of the Season at an annual awards ceremony.

== International career ==
He made his national team debut on 11 October 2020 in a Nations League game against Armenia.

== Career statistics ==
As of match played 23 June 2026

Appearances and goals by club, season and competition
Club	Season	League			National cup		Continental		Other		Total	
Club	Season	Division	Apps	Goals	Apps	Goals	Apps	Goals	Apps	Goals	Apps	Goals
Zestaponi	2009-10	Umaglesi Liga	12	0	–		–		–		12	0
Zestaponi	2010-11	Umaglesi Liga	18	2	3	0	2	0	–		23	2
Zestaponi	2011-12	Umaglesi Liga	25	0	5	0	5	0	–		35	0
Zestaponi	2012-13	Umaglesi Liga	15	0	–		2	0	–		17	0
Zestaponi	Total		70	2	8	0	9	0	0	0	87	2
Alania	2012–13	Russian Premier League	–		–		–		–		0	0
Dila Gori	2013–14	Umaglesi Liga	22	0	3	0	6	0	–		31	0
Rubin Kazan	2014–15	Russian Premier League	4	0	1	0	–		–		5	0
Mordovia (loan)	2015–16	Russian Premier League	1	0	1	0	–		–		2	0
Neftekhimik (loan)	2016–17	Russian First League	21	0	–		–		–		21	0
Lokomotivi Tbilisi	2017	Erovnuli Liga	15	1	–		–		–		15	1
Rustavi	2018	Erovnuli Liga	15	2	1	0	–		–		16	2
Torpedo Kutaisi	2018	Erovnuli Liga	17	1	4	0	8	1	–		29	2
Torpedo Kutaisi	2019	Erovnuli Liga	16	0	–		–		1 (Note: Appearances in Georgian Super Cup)	0	17	0
Torpedo Kutaisi	Total		33	1	4	0	8	1	1	0	46	2
Dinamo Batumi	2019	Erovnuli Liga	17	0	–		–		–		17	0
Dinamo Batumi	2020	Erovnuli Liga	15	1	1	0	1	0	–		17	1
Dinamo Batumi	2021	Erovnuli Liga	32	2	3	0	6	0	–		41	2
Dinamo Batumi	2022	Erovnuli Liga	34	2	–		3	0	1	0	38	2
Dinamo Batumi	2023	Erovnuli Liga	35	2	2	1	2	0	2	0	41	3
Dinamo Batumi	2024	Erovnuli Liga	30	3	1	0	4	0	2	0	37	3
Dinamo Batumi	2025	Erovnuli Liga	18	0	2	0	—		—		20	0
Dinamo Batumi	2026	Erovnuli Liga	19	1	0	0	—		—		19	1
Dinamo Batumi	Total		200	11	9	1	16	0	5	0	230	12
Career total			381	17	27	1	39	1	6	0	453	19

== Honours ==
=== Team ===
- Erovnuli Liga (4): 2010–11, 2011–12, 2021, 2023
- Georgian Cup (1): 2018
- Georgian Super Cup (3): 2011–12, 2019, 2022

=== Individual ===
- Best defender of Erovnuli Liga (4): 2018, 2019, 2020, 2023
