= Benjamin Teidi =

Nigerian footballer

Personal information
- Full name: Benjamin Opeyemi Teidi
- Date of birth: 5 May 1994 (age 32)
- Place of birth: Lagos, Nigeria
- Height: 1.82 m (6 ft 0 in)
- Position: Midfielder

Team information
- Current team: FC Navbahor
- Number: 13

Senior career*
Years	Team	Apps	(Gls)
2012–2013	Gagra	29	(2)
2013–2014	Guria	9	(0)
2014–2015	Algeti	15	(2)
2014–2015	Imereti	15	(4)
2015–2018	Merani	81	(4)
2018	Liepaja	5	(0)
2019–2023	Dinamo Batumi	130	(10)
2024	Kazma		
2024	Iberia 1999	12	(1)
2025–	Navbahor	34	(0)
- * Club domestic league appearances and goals as of 29 July 2026

Benjamin Teidi (born 5 May 1994) is a Nigerian professional footballer who plays as a midfielder for Uzbek club FC Navbahor.

He has won the Georgian top league three times and Super Cup once.

== Career ==
Benjamin Teidi started his professional career at the age of 18 at Georgian second division side Gagra. In 2015, Teidi joined Merani Martvili where he stayed for next four seasons. On 22 November 2016, he played full 90 minutes in the Georgian Cup final against Torpedo Kutaisi.

In early 2019, Teidi signed for Dinamo Batumi who had just gained promotion to Erovnuli Liga. Being a stable squad player during the following four years, Teidi contributed to Dinamo's title-laden success as they won the champion's title, lifted the national cup and three times secured the silver medals.

As he was supposed to move to Hapoel Tel Aviv after the 2022 season, Teidi wrote a farewell letter to Dinamo's fans, although two months later he made a surprise return to the club.

Teidi secured two more champion's titles in successive seasons. Apart from winning the league with Dinamo Batumi for the second time in 2023, a year later he lifted the Champion's Shield as a member of Iberia 1999, who had signed him in September 2024.

On December 23, 2024, Uzbekistan Super League side FC Navbahor announced the transfer of Benjamin Teidi.

== Statistics ==
As of match played 29 July 2026

Appearances and goals by club, season and competition
Club	Season	League			National Cup		Continental		Other		Total	
Club	Season	Division	Apps	Goals	Apps	Goals	Apps	Goals	Apps	Goals	Apps	Goals
Gagra	2012/13	Pirveli Liga	24	2	3	0	–		–		27	2
Gagra	2013/14	Pirveli Liga	5	0	–		–		–		5	0
Gagra	Total		29	2	3	0	0	0	0	0	32	2
Guria Lanchkhuti	2013/14	Umaglesi Liga	9	0	–		–		–		9	0
Algeti	2014/15	Pirveli Liga	15	2	–		–		–		15	2
Imereti Khoni	2015/16	Pirveli Liga	15	4	2	0	–		–		17	4
Merani Martvili	2015/16	Umaglesi Liga	14	0	–		–		–		14	0
Merani Martvili	2016	Pirveli Liga	19	2	5	0	–		–		24	2
Merani Martvili	2017	Erovnuli Liga	34	1	1	0	–		2 (Note: Appearances in play-offs)	0	37	1
Merani Martvili	2018	Erovnuli Liga	14	1	1	0	–		–		15	1
Merani Martvili	Total		81	4	7	0	0	0	2	0	90	4
Liepaja	2018	Virsliga	5	0	1	0	1 (Note: Appearances in UEFA Europa League)	0	–		7	0
Dinamo Batumi	2019	Erovnuli Liga	29	3	–		–		–		29	3
Dinamo Batumi	2020	Erovnuli Liga	14	0	1	0	1	0	–		16	0
Dinamo Batumi	2021	Erovnuli Liga	30	2	3	0	6 (Note: Appearances in UEFA Conference League)	0	–		39	2
Dinamo Batumi	2022	Erovnuli Liga	28	2	1	0	4 (Note: 2 appearances in UEFA Champions League and 2 appearances in Conference League)	0	1 (Note: Appearances in Georgian Super Cup)	0	34	2
Dinamo Batumi	2023	Erovnuli Liga	29	3	3	0	2	0	1	0	35	3
Dinamo Batumi	Total		130	10	8	0	13	0	2	0	153	10
Iberia 1999	2024	Erovnuli Liga	12	1	–		–		–		12	1
Navbahor Namangan	2025	Uzbekistan Super League	23	0	2	0	–		–		25	0
Navbahor Namangan	2026	Uzbekistan Super League	11	0	0	0	–		–		11	0
Navbahor Namangan	Total		34	0	2	0	0	0	0	0	36	0
Career total			330	25	21	0	14	0	4	0	371	23

== Honours ==
=== Iberia 1999 ===
- Erovnuli Liga winner (1): 2024

=== Dinamo Batumi ===
- Erovnuli Liga winner (2): 2021, 2023
- Erovnuli Liga runner-up (3): 2019, 2020, 2022
- Georgian Cup runner-up (1): 2023
- Georgian Super Cup winner (1): 2022
- Georgian Super Cup runner-up (1): 2023

=== Merani Martvili ===
- Georgian Cup runner-up (1): 2016
