= Ivan Lytvynenko =

Ukrainian footballer

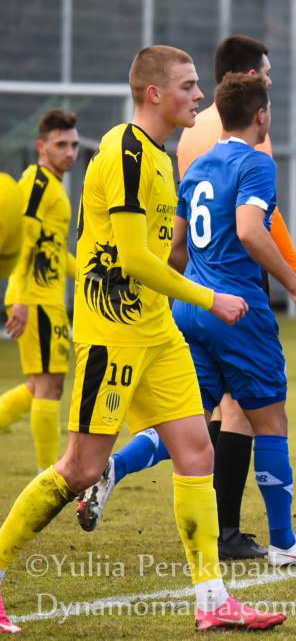
- Ivan Lytvynenko playing for Rukh Lviv U-21 in 2021

Personal information
- Full name: Ivan Serhiyovych Lytvynenko
- Date of birth: 10 April 2001 (age 25)
- Place of birth: Dnipropetrovsk, Ukraine
- Height: 1.84 m (6 ft 0 in)
- Position: Midfielder

Team information
- Current team: FK Žalgiris
- Number: 20

Youth career
- 2009–2014: Yuvileynyi Tsarychanka
- 2014–2018: Dnipro Dnipropetrovsk

Senior career*
| Years | Team | Apps | (Gls) |
| 2018–2020 | Dnipro-1 | 1 | (0) |
| 2020–2022 | Rukh Lviv | 2 | (0) |
| 2021 | → VPK-Ahro Shevchenkivka (loan) | 17 | (1) |
| 2022 | Chornomorets Odesa | 1 | (0) |
| 2023 | Dinamo Batumi | 16 | (0) |
| 2024 | Dila | 20 | (1) |
| 2024–2026 | Metalist 1925 | 39 | (2) |
| 2026– | Žalgiris | 5 | (1) |

International career^{‡}
| 2018 | Ukraine U17 | 3 | (0) |
| 2019 | Ukraine U18 | 3 | (1) |
- * Club domestic league appearances and goals as of 24 August 2026 ‡ National team caps and goals as of 28 April 2021

Ivan Serhiyovych Lytvynenko (Ukrainian: Іван Сергійович Литвиненко; born 10 April 2001) is a Ukrainian professional footballer who plays as a midfielder for FK Žalgiris.

== Career ==
Lytvynenko is a product of Dnipro-1 academy.

After several years spent at Ukrainian clubs, in February 2023 he moved to Dinamo Batumi in Erovnuli Liga, took part in 16 matches and lifted the champion's title.

Before the start of the next season, Lytvynenko joined Dila. On 29 March 2024, he scored his first goal in Georgia in a 3–1 win over Iberia 1999.

== Honours ==
Dinamo Batumi

- Erovnuli Liga (1): 2023
- Georgian Cup: Runners-up 2023
- Georgian Super Cup: Runners-up 2023

Dnipro-1

- Persha Liga (1): 2018–19
