= Vladan Vidaković =

Serbian footballer

Personal information
- Date of birth: 14 March 1999 (age 27)
- Place of birth: Novi Sad, FR Yugoslavia
- Height: 1.93 m (6 ft 4 in)
- Position: Midfielder

Team information
- Current team: Dunav Ruse
- Number: 44

Youth career
- –2016: Vojvodina
- 2016–2018: Voždovac

Senior career*
Years	Team	Apps	(Gls)
2018–2019	Voždovac	0	(0)
2018	→ Radnički Obrenovac (loan)	6	(1)
2019	Hajduk 1912	15	(7)
2019–2022	Spartak Subotica	88	(6)
2022–2024	Maribor	8	(0)
2023	→ Dinamo Batumi (loan)	12	(0)
2023	→ Spartak Subotica (loan)	17	(1)
2024	Yverdon-Sport	11	(0)
2024–2025	Novi Pazar	21	(1)
2025	Politehnica Iași	11	(0)
2026	Kabel	15	(3)
2026–	Dunav Ruse	0	(0)

International career
2015	Serbia U16	3	(0)
2015	Serbia U17 (Note: Official competitive matches only.)	1	(0)
- * Club domestic league appearances and goals as of 14 May 2026

Vladan Vidaković (Serbian Cyrillic: Владан Видаковић; born 14 March 1999) is a Serbian professional footballer who plays as a midfielder for Bulgarian First League club Dunav Ruse.

== Club career ==
Vidaković was a member of the youth academy of Vojvodina. He later played for Voždovac, Radnički Obrenovac and Hajduk 1912, before signing for Spartak Subotica in 2019. Vidaković played 88 games for Spartak in the Serbian SuperLiga, scoring 6 goals.

In July 2022, Vidaković transferred to Maribor for an alleged transfer fee of €450,000 and signed a three-year contract with reigning Slovenian PrvaLiga champions. He moved to the Swiss Super League in January 2024 to play for Yverdon-Sport, only to dismiss him in the summer of that year.

== International career ==
In June 2015, Vidaković was a member of the Serbian under-16 national team at the Miljan Miljanić Memorial Tournament. In October of the same year, he also made his competitive debut for the under-17 side in a 1–1 draw against Austria during the 2016 UEFA European Under-17 Championship qualifiers.
