= Giorgi Chankotadze =

Georgian footballer

Personal information
- Date of birth: 4 October 1977 (age 49)
- Height: 1.80 m (5 ft 11 in)
- Position: Defender

Senior career*
Years	Team	Apps	(Gls)
1994–1998	ShSS Akademia Tbilisi	117	(7)
1998–2001	FC WIT Georgia	87	(4)
2002	FC Gorda Rustavi	9	(0)

International career
1998–2001	Georgia	3	(0)
- * Club domestic league appearances and goals

Giorgi Chankotadze (Georgian: გიორგი ჭანკოტაძე; born 4 October 1977) is a retired Georgian professional football player.
