= Batumi Arena =

Football stadium in Batumi, Georgia

Coordinates: 41°38′07″N 41°37′09″E

- ბათუმი არენა
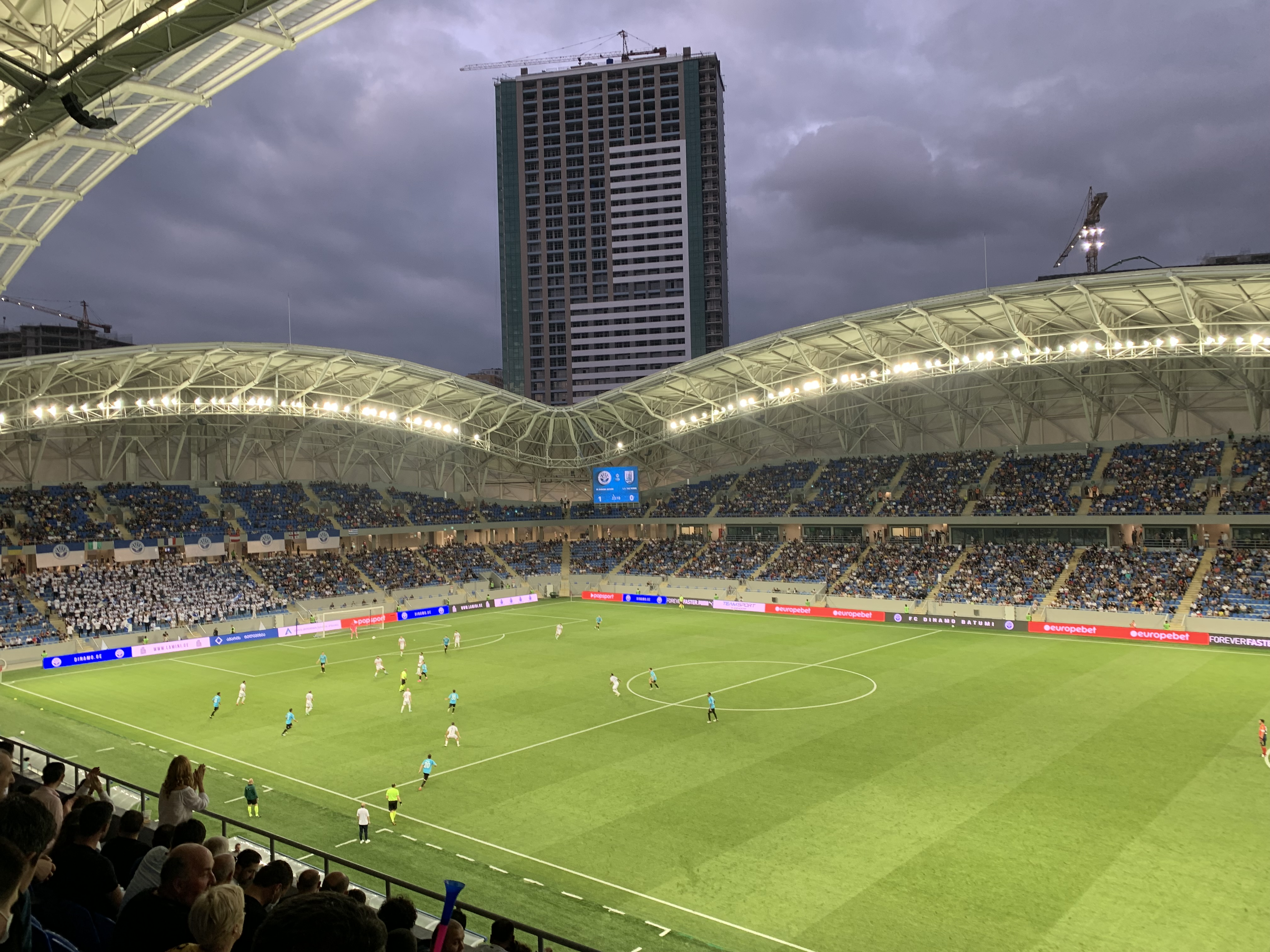
- UEFA Category 4 Stadium
- Interactive map of Batumi Arena
- Full name: Batumi Arena
- Location: Batumi, Georgia
- Owner: Government of Georgia
- Capacity: 20,035
- Surface: Grass

Construction
- Groundbreaking: 21 January 2018
- Built: January 2018 – July 2020
- Opened: 27 October 2020
- Cost: ₾ 141 million
- Architect: Bahadır Kul

Tenants
- Dinamo Batumi (2020–present); Georgia national football team (selected matches); Georgia national rugby union team (selected matches)

The Batumi Arena (Georgian: ბათუმი არენა, batumi arena), formerly known as Adjarabet Arena, is a football stadium in Batumi, Adjara, Georgia. The stadium has a capacity of 20,035 people.

== History ==
Construction began in January 2018 and was completed in July 2020. Its inauguration, postponed due to the COVID-19 pandemic, took place on 27 October 2020 with an official ceremony attended by then-Prime Minister of Georgia, Giorgi Gakharia.

It has a capacity of 20,000 seats and hosts FC Dinamo Batumi's home matches. It is a UEFA Category 4 Stadium and since 2021 has been occasionally hosting matches of the Georgian national football team.

The stadium was designed by the Turkish firm Bahadır Kul Architecture and cost about 141 million Georgian Lari (€49 million). The construction was carried out by Georgian company Anagi.

The exterior of the stadium, consisting of a series of panels arranged in the form of overlapping scales that can be illuminated at night, is inspired by the swirling effect of traditional Georgian dances, in particular Khorumi.

In 2023, it was one of four Georgian venues to host the 2023 UEFA European Under-21 Championship. In a final game of the tournament, England defeated Spain 1–0 here.

For sponsorship reasons, the stadium was known as Adjarabet Arena until September 2026 with the Adjarabet betting company purchasing this name for a five-year period in August 2021. According to media reports, the deal cost 8.7 million Lari.

== Notable games ==
The first match was held on November 21, 2020, between Dinamo Batumi and Dila.

On 10 July 2022, the Georgian Rugby Team defeated Italy 28–19. Batumi Stadium hosted this historical match, when Georgia defeated a first-tier team for the first time, in the 2022 summer series.

=== International games ===
11 November 2021 2022 FIFA World Cup qualification	Georgia	2–0	Sweden	Batumi
18:00 CST	Kvaratskhelia 61' 77'	Report		Stadium: Adjarabet Arena; Attendance: 6,800; Referee: Serdar Gözübüyük

28 March 2023 UEFA Euro 2024 qualification	Georgia	1–1	Norway	Batumi
18:00 CST	Mikautadze 60'	Report	Sørloth 15'	Stadium: Adjarabet Arena; Attendance: 20,300; Referee: Andris Treimanis

== See also ==
- FC Dinamo Batumi
- Stadiums in Georgia
- List of European stadiums by capacity
