= 2017 Erovnuli Liga =

Erovnuli Liga
- Season: 2017
- Dates: 4 March 2017 – 26 November 2017
- Champions: Torpedo Kutaisi; 4th Georgian title
- Relegated: Dinamo Batumi; Shukura Kobuleti
- Champions League: Torpedo Kutaisi
- Europa League: Dinamo Tbilisi; Samtredia; Chikhura Sachkhere
- Matches: 154
- Goals: 439 (2.85 per match)
- Top goalscorer: Irakli Sikharulidze (25)

The 2017 Erovnuli Liga (formerly known as Umaglesi Liga) was the 29th season of top-tier football in Georgia. Samtredia are the defending champions. The season began on 4 March 2017 and ended on 26 November 2017.

== Teams and stadia ==
Zugdidi and Tskhinvali were directly relegated at the end of the previous season; Sioni Bolnisi and Guria Lanchkhuti were also relegated after losing play-off ties. Because the league contracted from 14 to 10 teams for this season, there was no promotion from the 2016 Pirveli Liga.

Locations of the 2017 Erovnuli Liga teams.

Team	Location	Venue	Capacity
Chikhura Sachkhere	Zestaponi	David Abashidze Stadium	4,558
Dila Gori	Gori	Tengiz Burjanadze Stadium	5,000
Dinamo Batumi	Batumi	Batumi Rugby Arena	2,000
Dinamo Tbilisi	Tbilisi	Dinamo Arena	54,549
Kolkheti Poti	Kobuleti	Erosi Manjgaladze Stadium	6,000
Locomotive Tbilisi	Tbilisi	Mikheil Meskhi Stadium	27,223
Saburtalo Tbilisi	Tbilisi	Davit Petriashvili Stadium	27,223
FC Samtredia	Samtredia	Erosi Manjgaladze Stadium	5,000
Shukura Kobuleti	Kobuleti	Chele Arena	6,000
Torpedo Kutaisi	Kutaisi	Ramaz Shengelia Stadium	19,400

Source: Scoresway

== League table ==
Pos	Team	Pld	W	D	L	GF	GA	GD	Pts	Qualification or relegation
1	Torpedo Kutaisi (C)	36	23	7	6	59	27	+32	76	Qualification for the Champions League first qualifying round
2	Dinamo Tbilisi	36	23	6	7	79	29	+50	75	Qualification for the Europa League first qualifying round
3	Samtredia	36	20	8	8	62	39	+23	68	Qualification for the Europa League first qualifying round
4	Saburtalo Tbilisi	36	18	6	12	61	42	+19	60	
5	Chikhura Sachkhere	36	17	4	15	47	54	−7	55	Qualification for the Europa League first qualifying round (Note: Chikhura Sachkhere qualified for the Europa League first qualifying round by winning the 2017 Georgian Cup.)
6	Locomotive Tbilisi	36	16	5	15	63	53	+10	53	
7	Dila Gori	36	11	8	17	41	51	−10	41	
8	Dinamo Batumi (R)	36	10	3	23	28	60	−32	33	Qualification to Relegation play-offs
9	Kolkheti Poti (O)	36	6	8	22	31	73	−42	26	Qualification to Relegation play-offs
10	Shukura Kobuleti (R)	36	4	9	23	35	78	−43	21	Relegation to Erovnuli Liga 2

Source: Erovnuli Liga, Soccerway
Rules for classification: 1) Points; 2) Head-to-head points; 3) Head-to-head goal difference; 4) Head-to-head goals scored; 5) Head-to-head away goals scored (only if two teams); 6) Goal difference; 7) Goals scored.
(C) Champions; (O) Play-off winners; (R) Relegated

== Results ==
Each team will play the other nine teams home-and-away twice, for a total of 36 games each.

=== First half of season ===
Home \ Away	CHI	DIL	DBA	DTB	KOL	LOC	SAB	SAM	SHU	TKU
Chikhura Sachkhere	—	0–0	0–1	2–1	3–1	0–3	2–1	1–2	3–1	0–3
Dila Gori	2–0	—	0–1	1–1	1–1	0–2	0–1	1–2	4–0	0–2
Dinamo Batumi	0–0	2–3	—	0–1	0–0	1–2	0–1	0–1	2–0	1–3
Dinamo Tbilisi	2–1	1–2	4–0	—	1–0	3–0	2–0	3–2	5–0	2–1
Kolkheti Poti	1–3	0–0	0–1	0–3	—	0–5	3–0	1–2	0–0	0–3
Locomotive Tbilisi	5–0	3–3	2–1	1–0	1–2	—	1–2	0–1	0–3	1–1
Saburtalo Tbilisi	1–2	0–1	2–0	0–5	1–2	2–1	—	1–2	5–0	1–0
Samtredia	0–1	3–2	2–0	0–2	1–1	0–0	3–2	—	1–1	0–2
Shukura Kobuleti	1–4	0–0	2–4	1–4	2–4	0–5	1–2	0–2	—	1–1
Torpedo Kutaisi	2–1	1–1	1–0	0–2	2–1	2–0	0–0	2–1	1–0	—

Source: Erovnuli Liga
Legend: Blue = home team win; Yellow = draw; Red = away team win.

=== Second half of season ===
Home \ Away	CHI	DIL	DBA	DTB	KOL	LOC	SAB	SAM	SHU	TKU
Chikhura Sachkhere	—	4–2	2–1	1–3	2–1	1–0	0–0	1–2	1–1	1–3
Dila Gori	1–0	—	1–2	1–2	3–0	2–1	0–2	2–1	0–1	1–0
Dinamo Batumi	1–2	1–0	—	1–2	1–2	1–0	1–2	0–1	3–2	0–5
Dinamo Tbilisi	5–0	5–0	4–0	—	6–1	3–1	1–4	0–1	1–1	0–1
Kolkheti Poti	0–4	1–0	0–2	1–1	—	1–2	0–0	1–3	0–3*	1–2
Locomotive Tbilisi	3–0	4–2	3–0	3–1	1–0	—	1–1	2–5	2–2	2–0
Saburtalo Tbilisi	1–2	3–1	5–0	0–0	6–3	6–0	—	1–1	3–2	1–2
Samtredia	3–0	2–2	3–0	1–1	5–0	2–1	0–2	—	4–1	1–1
Shukura Kobuleti	0–1	0–1	0–0	0–1	3–2	1–3	1–2	2–2	—	1–2
Torpedo Kutaisi	0–2	2–1	2–0	1–1	0–0	4–2	2–0	2–0	3–1	—

Source: Erovnuli Liga
Legend: Blue = home team win; Yellow = draw; Red = away team win.

== Relegation play-offs ==
30 November 2017
13:00 UTC+4

Sioni Bolnisi	3–2	Dinamo Batumi
Dvali 16', 27', 45+1'	Report	Kvirkvelia 36'; Tevdoradze 40'

Tamaz Stepania Stadium, Bolnisi
Attendance: 1,500
Referee: Papuna Matcharadze
3 December 2017
17:00 UTC+4

Dinamo Batumi	3–2	Sioni Bolnisi
Grigalashvili 8'; Kvasov 62'; Martsvaladze 83'	Report	Koshkadze 36'; Sikharulia 90+2'
Penalties
Kvirkvelia (penalty scored); Martsvaladze (penalty missed); Grigalashvili (penalty missed); Shonia (penalty scored)	2–4	(penalty scored) Sikharulia; (penalty scored) Ugulava; (penalty scored) Kikava; (penalty missed) Chankotadze; (penalty scored) Dvali

Batumi Rugby Arena, Batumi
Attendance: 2,000
Referee: Giorgi Vadatchkoria

5–5 on aggregate. Sioni Bolnisi won 4–2 on penalties.

30 November 2017
14:30 UTC+4

Kolkheti Poti	2–1	Merani Martvili
Derebchynsky 36'; Bolkvadze 41'	Report	Tretyak 43'

Saragbo Baza Parki-Arena, Poti
Attendance: 1,500
Referee: Goga Kikacheishvili
3 December 2017
13:00 UTC+4

Merani Martvili	2–2	Kolkheti Poti
Kurdghelashvili 16', 90+2'	Report	Bukhaidze 54', 90'

Murtaz Khurtsilava Stadium, Martvili
Attendance: 2,000
Referee: Giorgi Kruashvili

Kolhketi Poti won 4–3 on aggregate.

== Top goalscorers ==
Rank	Goalscorer	Team	Goals
1	(Georgia (country)) Irakli Sikharulidze	Locomotive Tbilisi	25
2	(Georgia (country)) Beka Mikeltadze	Dinamo Tbilisi	15
2	(Georgia (country)) Dimitri Tatanashvili	Chikhura Sachkhere	15
4	(Georgia (country)) Tornike Kapanadze	Torpedo Kutaisi	14
5	(Georgia (country)) Giorgi Kharaishvili	Saburtalo Tbilisi	13
6	(Georgia (country)) Bachana Arabuli	Dinamo Tbilisi	11
6	(Georgia (country)) Giorgi Kukhianidze	Torpedo Kutaisi	11
6	(Georgia (country)) Levan Kutalia	Torpedo Kutaisi / Shukura Kobuleti	11
6	(Georgia (country)) Nikoloz Sabanadze	Samtredia / Torpedo Kutaisi	11
10	(Georgia (country)) Mamia Gavashelishvili	Locomotive Tbilisi	10
10	(Ukraine) Mykola Kovtalyuk	Kolkheti Poti	10
10	(Georgia (country)) Davit Volkovi	Saburtalo Tbilisi	10
