= 2021 Erovnuli Liga =

Erovnuli Liga
- Season: 2021
- Dates: 27 February 2021 – 4 December 2021
- Champions: Dinamo Batumi; 1st Georgian title
- Champions League: Dinamo Batumi
- Conference League: Dinamo Tbilisi; Dila Gori; Saburtalo Tbilisi
- Matches: 180
- Goals: 489 (2.72 per match)
- Top goalscorer: Zoran Marušić (15 goals)
- Biggest home win: Saburtalo Tbilisi 5-1 Samtredia (04 Dec 2021); Dinamo Tbilisi 5-1 Samtredia (24 sept 2021); Shukura Kobuleti 4-0 Dila Gori (03 Oct 2021); Dinamo Batumi 4–0 Saburtalo Tbilisi (01 Nov 2021); Samgurali Tsqaltubo 4-0 Samtredia (16 Sept 2021); Saburtalo Tbilisi 4-0 Samtredia (19 June 2021)
- Biggest away win: Shukura Kobuleti 1–8 Dinamo Batumi (29 April 2021)
- Highest scoring: Dinamo Batumi 7-3 Locomotive Tbilisi (16 Sept 2021)
- Longest winning run: 6 matches Dinamo Tbilisi
- Longest unbeaten run: 15 matches Dinamo Batumi
- Longest winless run: 17 matches Telavi
- Longest losing run: 6 matches Samtredia
- All statistics correct as of 8 December 2021.

The 2021 Erovnuli Liga or Crystalbet Erovnuli Liga 2021 (formerly known as Umaglesi Liga) is the 33rd season of top-tier football in Georgia. Dinamo Tbilisi are the defending champions. The season began on 27 February 2021 and is scheduled to end on 4 December 2021. The league winners will earn a place in the UEFA Champions League and the second and third-placed clubs will earn a place in the UEFA Europa Conference League.

== Teams and stadiums ==
=== Changes ===
Shukura (promoted after a three-year absence) and Samgurali Tsqaltubo (promoted after an eighteen-year absence) were promoted from the 2020 Erovnuli Liga 2. Chikhura (relegated after eight years in the top flight) and Merani Tbilisi (relegated after one year in the top flight) have been relegated to 2021 Erovnuli Liga 2.

Locations of the 2021 Erovnuli Liga teams.

Team	Location	Venue	Capacity
Dila Gori	Gori	Tengiz Burjanadze Stadium	5,000
Dinamo Batumi	Batumi	Adjarabet Arena	20,000
Dinamo Tbilisi	Tbilisi	Boris Paichadze Dinamo Arena	54,549
Locomotive Tbilisi	Tbilisi	Mikheil Meskhi Stadium; Saguramo Football Complex, Saguramo	22,754; 700
Saburtalo Tbilisi	Tbilisi	Mikheil Meskhi Stadium	22,754
Samgurali Tsqaltubo	Tsqaltubo	26 May Stadium	12,000
FC Samtredia	Samtredia	Erosi Manjgaladze Stadium	5,000
Shukura Kobuleti	Kobuleti	Chele Arena	6,000
FC Telavi	Telavi	Givi Chokheli Stadium	12,000
Torpedo Kutaisi	Kutaisi	Ramaz Shengelia Stadium	19,400

=== Personnel and kits ===
Team	Head coach	Captain	Kit manufacturer	Shirt sponsor
Dila	(Ukraine) Andriy Demchenko	(Georgia (country)) Davit Maisashvili	Adidas	Stari
Dinamo Batumi	(Georgia (country)) Gia Geguchadze	(Georgia (country)) Mamuka Kobakhidze	Puma	Europebet
Dinamo Tbilisi	(Georgia (country)) Kakhaber Tskhadadze	(Georgia (country)) Giorgi Papava	Puma	Betlive
Locomotive	(Georgia (country)) Giorgi Chiabrishvili	(Georgia (country)) Davit Ubilava	Jako	Crocobet
Saburtalo	(Georgia (country)) Khvicha Shubitidze	(Georgia (country)) Levan Kakubava	Erreà	Audi
Samgurali	(Georgia (country)) Samson Pruidze	(Georgia (country)) Papuna Poniava	Hummel	VTB
Samtredia	(Georgia (country)) Giorgi Tsetsadze	(Georgia (country)) Giorgi Arabidze	Joma	Archi
Shukura	(Georgia (country)) Giorgi Shashiashvili	(Georgia (country)) Nika Chanturia	Kelme	Crocobet
Telavi	(Georgia (country)) Giorgi Mikadze	(Georgia (country)) Mirian Jikia	Jako	m2 Crocobet
Torpedo	(Georgia (country)) Kakhaber Chkhetiani	(Georgia (country)) Irakli Dzaria	Legea	Eminflex

== League table ==
Pos	Team	Pld	W	D	L	GF	GA	GD	Pts	Qualification or relegation
1	Dinamo Batumi (C)	36	21	12	3	73	27	+46	75	Qualification for Champions League first qualifying round
2	Dinamo Tbilisi	36	21	7	8	59	28	+31	70	Qualification for Europa Conference League first qualifying round
3	Dila Gori	36	17	10	9	48	35	+13	61	Qualification for Europa Conference League first qualifying round
4	Saburtalo Tbilisi (Note: «Saburtalo Tbilisi qualified for the Europa Conference League first qualifying round as 2021 Georgian Cup winner)	36	15	12	9	52	40	+12	57	Qualification for Europa Conference League first qualifying round
5	Locomotive Tbilisi	36	15	8	13	57	59	−2	53	
6	Telavi	36	12	8	16	35	53	−18	44	
7	Samgurali Tsqaltubo	36	9	14	13	34	46	−12	41	
8	Torpedo Kutaisi (O)	36	9	13	14	38	44	−6	40	Qualification for Relegation play-offs
9	Shukura Kobuleti (R)	36	5	12	19	28	49	−21	27	Qualification for Relegation play-offs
10	Samtredia (R)	36	5	6	25	33	76	−43	21	Relegation to Erovnuli Liga 2

Source: Erovnuli Liga, Soccerway
Rules for classification: 1) Points; 2) Head-to-head points; 3) Head-to-head goal difference; 4) Head-to-head goals scored; 5) Head-to-head away goals scored (only if two teams); 6) Goal difference; 7) Goals scored.
(C) Champions; (O) Play-off winners; (R) Relegated

== Results ==
Each team will play the other nine teams home and away twice, for a total of 36 games each.

=== Round 1-18 ===
Home \ Away	DIL	DBT	DTB	LOC	SAB	SMG	SAM	SHU	TEL	TKU
Dila Gori	—	2–1	2–0	0–0	1–2	1–2	1–1	1–0	1–1	1–1
Dinamo Batumi	2–0	—	1–0	1–1	4–1	2–0	2–0	1–1	3–0	1–1
Dinamo Tbilisi	1–0	0–1	—	2–0	4–3	1–1	2–1	1–1	1–0	1–0
Locomotive Tbilisi	1–2	2–1	1–3	—	0–1	2–3	3–1	2–1	3–2	3–1
Saburtalo Tbilisi	3–0	0–0	0–4	2–0	—	2–0	4–0	2–2	0–0	0–0
Samgurali	1–2	0–0	2–0	1–3	0–0	—	0–1	1–0	1–1	2–1
Samtredia	0–2	0–2	0–2	3–4	2–3	2–3	—	2–2	2–1	0–0
Shukura Kobuleti	1–1	1–8	0–2	0–1	0–0	2–0	1–0	—	2–0	0–2
Telavi	0–2	1–2	0–3	2–2	0–2	0–0	1–0	1–0	—	0–4
Torpedo Kutaisi	1–0	0–1	0–2	1–3	1–1	0–0	1–1	0–0	2–2	—

Source: Erovnuli Liga Results
Legend: Blue = home team win; Yellow = draw; Red = away team win.

=== Round 19-36 ===
Home \ Away	DIL	DBT	DTB	LOC	SAB	SMG	SAM	SHU	TEL	TKU
Dila Gori	—	2–2	1–0	2–1	0–0	2–0	3–1	1–0	1–3	1–2
Dinamo Batumi	2–2	—	1–1	7–3	4–0	3–0	3–1	2–2	2–0	3–1
Dinamo Tbilisi	0–0	1–2	—	3–2	2–1	1–2	5–1	2–0	4–0	1–0
Locomotive Tbilisi	0–4	0–0	2–2	—	3–2	2–2	4–2	1–0	2–3	1–1
Saburtalo Tbilisi	0–0	1–1	0–1	1–2	—	2–1	5–1	2–1	2–1	3–0
Samgurali	1–3	0–3	2–2	0–0	1–1	—	4–0	0–0	0–1	0–0
Samtredia	1–2	1–0	0–0	1–0	0–2	1–2	—	1–1	0–2	4–1
Shukura Kobuleti	4–0	0–2	0–4	0–1	1–2	0–0	2–0	—	1–1	0–1
Telavi	0–2	0–1	1–0	2–1	2–1	1–1	2–1	2–1	—	1–3
Torpedo Kutaisi	0–3	2–2	0–1	0–1	1–1	4–1	4–1	2–1	0–1	—

Source: Erovnuli Liga Results
Legend: Blue = home team win; Yellow = draw; Red = away team win.

=== Relegation play-offs ===
8 December 2021
13:00

Merani Martvili	2–0	Torpedo Kutaisi
Sila 13'; Meliava 34'

Murtaz Khurtsilava Stadium, Martvili
Referee: Arsen Nonikashvili
12 December 2021
19:00

Torpedo Kutaisi	3–0 (a.e.t.)	Merani Martvili
Tsintsadze 64' (pen.); Mudimu 87'; Akhvlediani 102'

Ramaz Shengelia Stadium, Kutaisi
Referee: Giorgi Kruashvili

8 December 2021
13;00

Shukura Kobuleti	0–0	Gagra

Chele Arena, Kobuleti
Referee: Goga Kikacheishvili
12 December 2021
13:00

Gagra	1–0	Shukura Kobuleti
Makatsaria 7'

Tbilisi Sea Base, Tbilisi
Referee: Davit Kharitinishvili

== Season statistics ==
=== Top scorers ===
As of matches played on 4 December 2021

Rank	Player	Club	Goals
1	(Serbia) Zoran Marušić	Dinamo Tbilisi	16
2	(Georgia (country)) Giorgi Pantsulaia	Dinamo Batumi	13
3	(Georgia (country)) Jaba Jighauri	Dinamo Batumi	13
3	(Georgia (country)) Irakli Sikharulidze	Locomotive Tbilisi	12
5	(Georgia (country)) Sergo Kukhianidze	Samgurali	11
6	(Georgia (country)) Tornike Kapanadze	Dila Gori	10
6	(Georgia (country)) Giorgi Gabedava	Dinamo Tbilisi	10
8	(Moldova) Dmitri Mandrîcenco	Saburtalo Tbilisi	9
8	(Georgia (country)) Iuri Tabatadze	Saburtalo Tbilisi	9
8	(Georgia (country)) Vladimer Mamuchashvili	Dinamo Batumi	9
