= 2026 FC Dinamo Tbilisi season =

FC Dinamo Tbilisi
2026 season
- Chairman: Roman Pipia
- Manager: Vladimir Kakashvili (until 23 April); Temur Ketsbaia (from 24 April)
- Stadium: Boris Paichadze Dinamo Arena
- Erovnuli Liga: 2nd
- Georgian Cup: Round of 16 vs Guria Lanchkhuti
- UEFA Conference League: First qualifying round vs Žalgiris
- Top goalscorer: League: Mate Vatsadze (6); All: Mate Vatsadze (8)
| Home colours | Away colours | Third colours |

The 2026 FC Dinamo Tbilisi season was the thirty-eighth successive season that FC Dinamo Tbilisi played in the top flight of Georgian football.

== Season events ==
On 11 January, Dinamo announced that Ștefan Sicaci, Léo Assunpção, Adrian César, Bohdan Potalov, Honore Gomis, Giorgi Lomtadze, Vasilios Gordeziani and Valerian Gvilia had all left Dinamo after their contracts had expired, and that Tsotne Berelidze had joined Samgurali Tskaltubo on loan for the season.

On 15 January, Dinamo announced the signing of Giorgi Kharebashvili from Gagra, to a one-year contract.

On 21 January, Dinamo announced the signing of Léo Santos from Estoril Praia, to a three-year contract.

On 22 January, Dinamo announced the signing of Rui Monteiro from Porto B, to a two-year contract.

On 3 February, Dinamo announced the signing of Iyed Hadj Khalifa, who'd last played for Ben Guerdane, to a two-year contract.

On 9 February, Dinamo announced that they had agreed the transfer of Saba Kharebashvili with İstanbul Başakşehir, for the player to join them in September once he turns 18-years old.

On 13 February, Dinamo announced the signing of Numan Kurdić, who'd last played for Mes Rafsanjan, to a one-year contract.

On 24 February, Dinamo announced the return of Aleksandre Kalandadze from Wisła Płock, with Kalandadze signing a two-year contract with the club.

On 5 March, Dinamo announced the signing of Rodrigo Ramos from Ararat-Armenia.

On 6 March, Dinamo announced the return of Giorgi Zaria to the club after he'd left Kairat at the end of the previous season, and the loan signing of Daniel Kvartskhav from Iberia 1999.

On 9 March, Dinamo announced that Mate Shatirishvili had joined Samgurali Tskaltubo on loan for the season.

On 17 March, Dinamo announced the signings of Albert Gomez and Abdoulie Njie on loan from İstanbul Başakşehir until the end of the season, after both players had been on trial with the club.

On 20 March, Dinamo announced the signing of free-agent Josh Onomah to a one-year contract with the option of an additional year.

On 23 April, Dinamo announced that Vladimer Kakashvili had left his role as Head Coach by mutual consent. The following day, Temur Ketsbaia was appointed as the clubs new Head Coach, returning to the club he played for between 1987 and 1992.

On 5 June, Dinamo announced the signing of Maxime Do Couto from Krasava ENY Ypsonas, to a two-year contract.

On 11 June, Kazakhstan Premier League club Aktobe announced the signing of Giorgi Zaria as a free agent.

On 26 June, Dinamo announced that their loan deals with Abdoulaye Yoro and Nana-Kofi Donkor had come to an end. Also on 26 June, Dinamo announced the signing of Algassime Bah from APOEL on a contract until the summer of 2028, coming into effect on 1 July, and the signing of Paris Psaltis from Ethnikos Achna on a contract until the end of 2027.

On 1 July, Dinamo announced that Andria Kvirikadze had left the club to sign for Paris FC.

On 20 July, Dinamo announced the signing of Lyes Houri from Universitatea Craiova, on a contract until the end of the 2027 season.

On 25 July, Dinamo announced the signing of Matthew Gbomadu from Estrela da Amadora, to a three-year contract.

On 8 August, Dinamo announced the signing of Welton, who'd most recently played for Ararat-Armenia, to a one-year contract.

On 12 August, Dinamo announced the signing of Lucas Flores, who'd last played for Ethnikos Achna, on a contract until the end of 2028.

On 26 August, Dinamo announced the signing of Marios Pourzitidis, who'd last played for Dukla Prague, on a contract until the end of 2028.

On 9 November, Dinamo announced that they had terminated their contract with Jaba Kankava by mutual agreement.

== Squad ==
As of match played 8 November 2026

| No. | Name | Nationality | Position | Date of birth (age) | Signed from | Signed in | Contract ends | Apps. | Goals |
Goalkeepers
| 1 | Giorgi Loria | (Georgia (country)) | GK | 27 January 1986 (age 40) | Omonia Aradippou | 2025 | | 318 | 0 |
| 20 | Lucas Flores | (Brazil) | GK | 4 July 2002 (age 24) | Unattached | 2026 | 2028 | 11 | 0 |
| 37 | Mikheil Makatsaria | (Georgia (country)) | GK | 11 June 2004 (age 22) | Academy | 2022 | | 48 | 0 |
| 38 | Dachi Chochoshvili | (Georgia (country)) | GK | 18 February 2008 (age 18) | Academy | 2026 | | 0 | 0 |
| 40 | Mate Ghaghvishvili | (Georgia (country)) | GK | 13 February 2007 (age 19) | Academy | 2024 | | 0 | 0 |
Defenders
| 2 | Giorgi Gvasalia | (Georgia (country)) | DF | 5 September 2007 (age 19) | Academy | 2024 | | 33 | 2 |
| 3 | Aleksandre Kalandadze | (Georgia (country)) | DF | 9 May 2001 (age 25) | Wisła Płock | 2026 | 2028 | 137 | 6 |
| 4 | Nikoloz Ugrekhelidze | (Georgia (country)) | DF | 15 August 2003 (age 23) | Academy | 2023 | | 73 | 9 |
| 6 | Léo Santos | (Brazil) | DF | 21 July 2003 (age 23) | Estoril Praia | 2026 | 2028 | 34 | 4 |
| 13 | Marios Pourzitidis | (Greece) | DF | 8 May 1999 (age 27) | Unattached | 2026 | 2028 | 11 | 1 |
| 17 | Paris Psaltis | (Cyprus) | DF | 12 November 1996 (age 30) | Ethnikos Achna | 2026 | 2027 | 17 | 0 |
| 19 | Dimitri Jakhia | (Georgia (country)) | DF | 25 February 2002 (age 24) | Gori | 2026 | | 0 | 0 |
| 27 | Numan Kurdić | (Bosnia and Herzegovina) | DF | 1 July 1999 (age 27) | Unattached | 2026 | 2028 | 35 | 3 |
| 30 | Giorgi Lomidze | (Georgia (country)) | DF | 17 February 2008 (age 18) | Academy | 2026 | | 5 | 0 |
| 31 | Levan Kharabadze | (Georgia (country)) | DF | 26 January 2000 (age 26) | Torpedo Kutaisi | 2026 | | 6 | 0 |
| 35 | Shotiko Diakonidze | (Georgia (country)) | DF | 18 May 2008 (age 18) | Academy | 2026 | | 0 | 0 |
Midfielders
| 8 | Welton | (Brazil) | MF | 22 November 1998 (age 27) | Unattached | 2026 | 2027 | 13 | 0 |
| 10 | Giorgi Kharaishvili | (Georgia (country)) | MF | 29 July 1996 (age 30) | Unattached | 2025 | | 70 | 12 |
| 14 | Maxime Do Couto | (France) | MF | 13 December 1996 (age 29) | Krasava ENY Ypsonas | 2026 | 2028 | 20 | 4 |
| 16 | Nikoloz Tkalia | (Georgia (country)) | MF | 9 August 2006 (age 20) | Academy | 2026 | | 3 | 0 |
| 22 | Nika Ninua | (Georgia (country)) | MF | 22 June 1999 (age 27) | Unattached | 2024 | | 183 | 27 |
| 24 | Barnes Osei | (Ghana) | MF | 8 January 1995 (age 31) | Bnei Sakhnin | 2025 | | 127 | 12 |
| 25 | Tornike Gobronidze | (Georgia (country)) | MF | 16 August 2000 (age 26) | Iveria Khashuri | 2026 | | 0 | 0 |
| 26 | Gabriel Gogua | (Georgia (country)) | MF | 13 June 2010 (age 16) | Academy | 2026 | | 2 | 0 |
| 29 | Reziko Danelia | (Georgia (country)) | MF | 17 August 2007 (age 19) | Academy | 2026 | | 2 | 0 |
| 32 | Luka Tsikolia | (Georgia (country)) | MF | 2 March 2008 (age 18) | Academy | 2026 | | 11 | 0 |
| 33 | Lyes Houri | (France) | MF | 19 January 1996 (age 30) | Universitatea Craiova | 2026 | 2027 | 15 | 0 |
| 39 | Koba Kakashvili | (Georgia (country)) | MF | 10 April 2008 (age 18) | Academy | 2026 | | 12 | 1 |
Forwards
| 7 | Khalid Doltmurziev | (Georgia (country)) | FW | 22 May 2007 (age 19) | Club NXT | 2025 | | 21 | 4 |
| 11 | Mate Vatsadze | (Georgia (country)) | FW | 17 December 1988 (age 37) | Gagra | 2024 | | | |
| 12 | Algassime Bah | (Guinea) | FW | 12 November 2002 (age 24) | APOEL | 2026 | 2028 | 10 | 2 |
| 18 | Tornike Kvaratskhelia | (Georgia (country)) | FW | 7 February 2010 (age 16) | Academy | 2026 | | 19 | 0 |
| 21 | Daniel Kvartskhava | (Georgia (country)) | FW | 15 July 2006 (age 20) | on loan from Iberia 1999 | 2026 | 2026 | 14 | 0 |
| 28 | Rati Aleksidze | (Georgia (country)) | FW | 7 March 2007 (age 19) | Academy | 2025 | | 4 | 0 |
| 34 | Matthew Gbomadu | (Nigeria) | FW | 16 October 2004 (age 22) | Estrela da Amadora | 2026 | 2029 | 6 | 0 |
Dinamo Tbilisi II Players
| 15 | Albert Gomez | (The Gambia) | DF | 28 July 2006 (age 20) | on loan from İstanbul Başakşehir | 2026 | 2026 | 0 | 0 |
| 16 | Abdoulie Njie | (The Gambia) | FW | 24 August 2007 (age 19) | on loan from İstanbul Başakşehir | 2026 | 2026 | 1 | 0 |
| 21 | Raul Baratelia | (Georgia (country)) | MF | 20 August 2004 (age 22) | Academy | 2025 | | 0 | 0 |
| 28 | Luka Salukvadze | (Georgia (country)) | DF | 28 January 2003 (age 23) | Academy | 2024 | | 1 | 0 |
| 32 | Sandro Mikautadze | (Georgia (country)) | FW | 6 March 2009 (age 17) | Academy | 2024 | | 1 | 0 |
| 44 | Lazare Natenadze | (Georgia (country)) | MF | 31 January 2007 (age 19) | Academy | 2025 | | 0 | 0 |
| 45 | Levan Nachkebia | (Georgia (country)) | MF | 30 March 2006 (age 20) | Academy | 2024 | | 2 | 0 |
| 46 | Saba Nioradze | (Georgia (country)) | MF | 16 January 2007 (age 19) | Academy | 2025 | | 1 | 0 |
| | Giorgi Chkhetiani | (Georgia (country)) | DF | 20 February 2003 (age 23) | Academy | 2024 | | 0 | 0 |
| | Tengo Gobeshia | (Georgia (country)) | DF | 7 January 2005 (age 21) | Academy | 2024 | | 1 | 0 |
| | Giorgi Meparishvili | (Georgia (country)) | DF | 11 June 2006 (age 20) | Academy | 2024 | | 0 | 0 |
| | Luka Shashiashvili | (Georgia (country)) | DF | 10 March 2006 (age 20) | Academy | 2026 | | 0 | 0 |
| | Luka Bubuteishvili | (Georgia (country)) | MF | 12 February 2006 (age 20) | Academy | 2024 | | 2 | 0 |
| | Nika Sikharulashvili | (Georgia (country)) | MF | 7 October 2003 (age 23) | Academy | 2023 | | 13 | 1 |
| | Giorgi Tsetskhladze | (Georgia (country)) | MF | 4 March 2005 (age 21) | Academy | 2024 | | 8 | 0 |
| | Jaduli Iobashvili | (Georgia (country)) | FW | 1 January 2004 (age 22) | Academy | 2023 | | 28 | 2 |
Academy players
| | Lasha Khutsishvili | (Georgia (country)) | DF | 4 April 2007 (age 19) | Academy | 2026 | | 0 | 0 |
| | Shota Diakonidze | (Georgia (country)) | MF | 18 May 2008 (age 18) | Academy | 2025 | | 1 | 0 |
| | Yusuf Mekhtiev | (Georgia (country)) | FW | 1 May 2006 (age 20) | Academy | 2024 | | 1 | 0 |
Players away on loan
| 8 | Luka Tsulaia | (Georgia (country)) | MF | 13 March 2007 (age 19) | Academy | 2025 | | 9 | 0 |
| 25 | Mate Shatirishvili | (Georgia (country)) | DF | 25 May 2008 (age 18) | Academy | 2025 | | 7 | 0 |
| 29 | Iyed Hadj Khalifa | (Tunisia) | FW | 30 September 1999 (age 27) | Unattached | 2026 | 2027 | 0 | 0 |
| | Mate Sauri | (Georgia (country)) | GK | 6 June 2006 (age 20) | Academy | 2024 | | 0 | 0 |
| | Tsotne Berelidze | (Georgia (country)) | MF | 24 March 2006 (age 20) | Academy | 2023 | | 46 | 0 |
| | Temur Odikadze | (Georgia (country)) | FW | 28 March 2006 (age 20) | Academy | 2025 | | 13 | 2 |
Left during the season
| 5 | Saba Kharebashvili | (Georgia (country)) | DF | 3 September 2008 (age 18) | Academy | 2024 | | 75 | 0 |
| 9 | Giorgi Zaria | (Georgia (country)) | MF | 14 July 1997 (age 29) | Unattached | 2026 | | 87 | 7 |
| 13 | Rodrigo Ramos | (Portugal) | FW | 13 November 2003 (age 23) | Ararat-Armenia | 2026 | | 14 | 2 |
| 17 | Nana-Kofi Donkor | (Ghana) | MF | 5 January 2007 (age 19) | on loan from Dila Gori | 2025 | 2026 | 16 | 4 |
| 19 | Irakli Siradze | (Georgia (country)) | FW | 13 March 2001 (age 25) | Atlantis | 2025 | | 37 | 6 |
| 20 | Rui Monteiro | (Portugal) | FW | 1 April 2003 (age 23) | Porto B | 2026 | 2027 | 14 | 3 |
| 23 | Jaba Kankava | (Georgia (country)) | MF | 18 March 1986 (age 40) | Unattached | 2025 | | | |
| 25 | Josh Onomah | (England) | MF | 27 April 1997 (age 29) | Unattached | 2026 | 2026 (+1) | 6 | 0 |
| 26 | Abdoulaye Yoro | (Ivory Coast) | MF | 12 December 2006 (age 19) | on loan from İstanbul Başakşehir | 2025 | 2026 | 31 | 7 |
| 33 | Giorgi Kharebashvili | (Georgia (country)) | MF | 22 August 1996 (age 30) | Gagra | 2026 | 2026 | 13 | 0 |
| 34 | Yussif Musah | (Ghana) | DF | 15 February 2008 (age 18) | Academy | 2026 | | 0 | 0 |
| 36 | Lasha Patarkatsishvili | (Georgia (country)) | DF | 13 February 2006 (age 20) | Academy | 2026 | | 0 | 0 |
| | Andria Kvirikadze | (Georgia (country)) | MF | 14 May 2008 (age 18) | Academy | 2026 | | 0 | 0 |

== Transfers ==
=== In ===
| Date | Position | Nationality | Name | From | Fee | Ref. |
|---|---|---|---|---|---|---|
| 15 January 2026 | FW | (Georgia (country)) | Giorgi Kharebashvili | Gagra | Undisclosed | |
| 21 January 2026 | DF | (Brazil) | Léo Santos | Estoril Praia | Undisclosed | |
| 22 January 2026 | MF | (Portugal) | Rui Monteiro | Porto B | Undisclosed | |
| 3 February 2026 | FW | (Tunisia) | Iyed Hadj Khalifa | Unattached | Free | |
| 13 February 2026 | DF | (Bosnia and Herzegovina) | Numan Kurdić | Unattached | Free | |
| 5 March 2026 | FW | (Portugal) | Rodrigo Ramos | Ararat-Armenia | Undisclosed | |
| 6 March 2026 | MF | (Georgia (country)) | Giorgi Zaria | Unattached | Free | |
| 20 March 2026 | MF | (England) | Josh Onomah | Unattached | Free | |
| 5 June 2026 | MF | (France) | Maxime Do Couto | Krasava ENY Ypsonas | Undisclosed | |
| 26 June 2026 | DF | (Cyprus) | Paris Psaltis | Ethnikos Achna | Undisclosed | |
| 26 June 2026 (Note: Transfer announced on the shown date, becoming official on 1 July 2026.) | FW | (Guinea) | Algassime Bah | APOEL | Free | |
| 20 July 2026 | MF | (France) | Lyes Houri | Universitatea Craiova | Undisclosed | |
| 25 July 2026 | FW | (Nigeria) | Matthew Gbomadu | Estrela da Amadora | Undisclosed | |
| 8 August 2026 | MF | (Brazil) | Welton | Unattached | Free | |
| 12 August 2026 | GK | (Brazil) | Lucas Flores | Unattached | Free | |
| 26 August 2026 | DF | (Greece) | Marios Pourzitidis | Unattached | Free | |

=== Loans in ===
| Date from | Position | Nationality | Name | From | Date to | Ref. |
|---|---|---|---|---|---|---|
| 15 July 2025 | MF | (Ghana) | Nana-Kofi Donkor | Dila Gori | 26 June 2026 | |
| 26 July 2025 | DF | (Georgia (country)) | Luka Latsabidze | Shakhtar Donetsk | 2 February 2026 | |
| 26 July 2025 | MF | (Ivory Coast) | Abdoulaye Yoro | İstanbul Başakşehir | 26 June 2026 | |
| 6 March 2026 | FW | (Georgia (country)) | Daniel Kvartskhav | Iberia 1999 | 31 December 2026 | |
| 17 March 2026 | DF | (The Gambia) | Albert Gomez | İstanbul Başakşehir | Undisclosed | |
| 17 March 2026 | FW | (The Gambia) | Abdoulie Njie | İstanbul Başakşehir | Undisclosed | |

=== Out ===
| Date | Position | Nationality | Name | To | Fee | Ref. |
|---|---|---|---|---|---|---|
| 1 January 2026 | MF | (Georgia (country)) | Otar Aptsiauri | Samgurali Tskaltubo | Undisclosed | |
| 8 January 2026 | MF | (Georgia (country)) | Tornike Morchiladze | Rijeka | Undisclosed | |
| 1 February 2026 | MF | (Georgia (country)) | Nikoloz Tsetskhladze | Samgurali Tskaltubo | Undisclosed | |
| 1 July 2026 | MF | (Georgia (country)) | Andria Kvirikadze | Paris FC | Undisclosed | |
| 10 July 2026 | DF | (Ghana) | Yussif Musah | Kolkheti-1913 Poti | Undisclosed | |
| 25 July 2026 | FW | (Georgia (country)) | Giorgi Kharebashvili | Telavi | Undisclosed | |
| 3 September 2026 | DF | (Georgia (country)) | Saba Kharebashvili | İstanbul Başakşehir | Undisclosed | |

=== Loans out ===
| Date from | Position | Nationality | Name | To | Date to | Ref. |
|---|---|---|---|---|---|---|
| 11 January 2026 | MF | (Georgia (country)) | Tsotne Berelidze | Samgurali Tskaltubo | 31 December 2026 | |
| 9 March 2026 | DF | (Georgia (country)) | Mate Shatirishvili | Samgurali Tskaltubo | 31 December 2026 | |
| 15 March 2026 | FW | (Tunisia) | Iyed Hadj Khalifa | Gori | 31 December 2026 | |

=== Released ===
| Date | Position | Nationality | Name | Joined | Date | Ref. |
|---|---|---|---|---|---|---|
| 11 January 2026 | GK | (Moldova) | Ștefan Sicaci | Zhetysu | 24 January 2026 | |
| 11 January 2026 | DF | (Ukraine) | Bohdan Potalov | Asia Talas | | |
| 11 January 2026 | MF | (Georgia (country)) | Valerian Gvilia | | | |
| 11 January 2026 | MF | (Georgia (country)) | Giorgi Lomtadze | Monterey Bay | 21 January 2026 | |
| 11 January 2026 | MF | (Senegal) | Honore Gomis | Kyzylzhar | 5 February 2026 | |
| 11 January 2026 | FW | (Brazil) | Adrian César | PSTC-PR | | |
| 11 January 2026 | FW | (Georgia (country)) | Vasilios Gordeziani | Hellas Syros | | |
| 11 June 2026 | FW | (Georgia (country)) | Giorgi Zaria | Aktobe | 11 June 2026 | |
| 30 June 2026 | MF | (England) | Josh Onomah | | | |
| 30 June 2026 | FW | (Georgia (country)) | Irakli Siradze | Samgurali Tskaltubo | 8 July 2026 | |
| 30 June 2026 | FW | (Portugal) | Rodrigo Ramos | Atlético CP | | |
| 30 June 2026 | FW | (Portugal) | Rui Monteiro | IFK Mariehamn | 15 July 2026 | |
| 9 November 2026 | MF | (Georgia (country)) | Jaba Kankava | | | |

=== Trial ===
| Date from | Position | Nationality | Name | Last club | Date end | Ref. |
|---|---|---|---|---|---|---|
| February 2026 | DF | (The Gambia) | Albert Gomez | İstanbul Başakşehir | 17 March 2026 | |
| February 2026 | FW | (The Gambia) | Abdoulie Njie | İstanbul Başakşehir | 17 March 2026 | |

== Friendlies ==
| 23 January 2026 | Rustavi | 2–1 | Dinamo Tbilisi | Rustavi |
| 14:00 GET (UTC+4) | Goal | Report | Siradze | Stadium: Technical Centre |

| 26 January 2026 | Dinamo Tbilisi | 2–0 | Shturmi | Rustavi |
| GET (UTC+4) | Ugrekhelidze; Khutsishvili | Report | | Stadium: Technical Centre |

| 2 February 2026 | Dinamo Tbilisi | 1–1 | Samgurali Tskaltubo | Tbilisi |
| GET (UTC+4) | Siradze; Vatsadze (penalty missed) | Report | Khorkheli | Stadium: Dinamo Arena |

| 7 February 2026 | Shakhtar Donetsk | 7–2 | Dinamo Tbilisi | Antalya, Turkey |
| GET (UTC+4) | Elias 17'; Ugrekhelidze 21' (o.g.); Bondarenko 44' (pen.); Nazaryna 48', 87'; Ferreira 50'; Obah 63' | Report | Kharebashvili 2'; Osei 41' | Stadium: Mardan Stadium; Attendance: 100 |

| 10 February 2026 | Auda | 0–1 | Dinamo Tbilisi | Antalya, Turkey |
| GET (UTC+4) | | Report |

| 13 February 2026 | Dinamo Tbilisi | 0–2 | Veres Rivne | Antalya, Turkey |
| GET (UTC+4) | | Report |

| 16 February 2026 | Dinamo Tbilisi | 1–1 | Navbahor Namangan | Antalya, Turkey |
| GET (UTC+4) | Monteiro | Report | Goal |

| 17 February 2026 | Dinamo Tbilisi | – | Caspiy | Antalya, Turkey |
| GET (UTC+4) |

| 17 February 2026 | Dinamo Tbilisi | 1–1 | Zhetysu | Antalya, Turkey |
| GET (UTC+4) | Aleksidze | Report | Goal |

| 27 March 2026 | Dinamo Tbilisi | 2–1 | Spaeri | Tbilisi |
| GET (UTC+4) | Yoro; Osei | Report | Goal | Stadium: Boris Paichadze Dinamo Arena |

== Competitions ==
=== Overview ===
| Competition | First match | Last match | Starting round | Final position | Record | | | | | | | |
| Competition | First match | Last match | Starting round | Final position | Pld | W | D | L | GF | GA | GD | Win % |
|---|---|---|---|---|---|---|---|---|---|---|---|---|
| Erovnuli Liga | 7 March 2026 | | Matchday 1 | | 32 | 16 | 10 | 6 | 52 | 32 | +20 | 50.00 |
| Georgian Cup | 26 July 2026 | 26 July 2026 | Round of 16 | Round of 16 | 1 | 0 | 0 | 1 | 0 | 1 | −1 | 0.00 |
| Super Cup | 27 June 2026 | 1 July 2026 | Semifinal | 3rd | 2 | 0 | 1 | 1 | 0 | 1 | −1 | 0.00 |
| UEFA Conference League | 9 July 2026 | 30 July 2026 | First qualifying round | Second qualifying round | 4 | 2 | 1 | 1 | 8 | 9 | −1 | 50.00 |
| Total | | | | | 39 | 18 | 12 | 9 | 60 | 43 | +17 | 46.15 |

Last updated: 8 November 2026
Source: Competitions

=== Super Cup ===
| 27 June 2026 Semifinal | Iberia 1999 | 1–0 | Dinamo Tbilisi | Tbilisi |
| 19:00 GET (UTC+4) | Bedoshvili 12'; Kutsia (yellow card) 56'; Natchkebia (yellow card) 67'; Dadiani (yellow card) 76' | Report | Tsikolia (yellow card) 52'; Osei (yellow card) 69'; Santos (yellow card) 82' | Stadium: Mikheil Meskhi Stadium; Referee: Tsotne Samsonashvili |

| 1 July 2026 Third place playoff | Dila Gori | 0–0 (2–4 p) | Dinamo Tbilisi | Gori |
| 20:00 GET (UTC+4) | Menteshashvili (yellow card) 86'; Araújo (yellow card) 90+3' | Report | Tsikolia (yellow card) 61'; Osei (yellow card) 67'; Vatsadze (yellow card) 85'; Kurdić (yellow card) 86' | Stadium: Tengiz Burjanadze Stadium; Referee: Davit Butiashvili |
| | Penalties |
| | Menteshashvili (penalty scored); Gogoberishvili (penalty missed); Parulava (penalty scored); Kouakou (penalty missed) | | (penalty scored) Ninua; (penalty scored) Santos; (penalty scored) Bah; (penalty scored) Do Couto |

=== Erovnuli Liga ===
==== Results summary ====
| Overall | | | | | | | | Home | | | | | | Away | | | | | |
| Pld | W | D | L | GF | GA | GD | Pts | W | D | L | GF | GA | GD | W | D | L | GF | GA | GD |
|---|---|---|---|---|---|---|---|---|---|---|---|---|---|---|---|---|---|---|---|
| 32 | 16 | 10 | 6 | 51 | 31 | +20 | 58 | 7 | 5 | 4 | 24 | 17 | +7 | 9 | 5 | 2 | 27 | 14 | +13 |

Last updated: 8 November 2026.
Source: See Results

==== Results by round ====
| Round | 2 | 3 | 4 | 5 | 6 | 1 | 7 | 8 | 9 | 10 | 11 | 12 | 13 | 14 | 15 | 16 | 17 | 18 | 19 | 20 | 21 | 23 | 24 | 25 | 26 | 27 | 22 | 28 | 29 | 30 | 31 | 32 |
|---|---|---|---|---|---|---|---|---|---|---|---|---|---|---|---|---|---|---|---|---|---|---|---|---|---|---|---|---|---|---|---|---|
| Ground | A | H | A | H | A | H | H | H | A | A | H | A | H | A | H | A | A | H | H | A | H | H | A | H | H | A | A | A | H | A | H | A |
| Result | W | D | D | W | D | D | D | L | W | D | W | W | W | D | L | W | L | W | W | W | L | W | D | D | W | W | W | L | W | W | D | W |
| Position | 1 | 3 | 2 | 7 | 8 | 7 | 7 | 8 | 6 | 6 | 5 | 4 | 2 | 4 | 4 | 4 | 4 | 3 | 3 | 3 | 3 | 2 | 3 | 4 | 3 | 2 | 1 | 4 | 3 | 3 | 3 | 3 |
| Points | 3 | 4 | 5 | 5 | 6 | 7 | 8 | 8 | 11 | 12 | 15 | 18 | 21 | 22 | 22 | 25 | 25 | 28 | 31 | 34 | 34 | 37 | 38 | 39 | 42 | 45 | 48 | 48 | 51 | 54 | 55 | 58 |

Source: See Results
A = Away; H = Home; W = Win; D = Draw; L = Loss

==== Results ====
| 7 March 2026 2 | Spaeri | 1–2 | Dinamo Tbilisi | Tbilisi |
| 18:00 GET (UTC+4) | Poniava (yellow card) 59'; Askurava (yellow card) 62'; Samkharadze 68' (pen.) (yellow card) 88' | Report | Ugrekhelidze 9' (yellow card) 43'; Monteiro 35'; Kharebashvili (yellow card) 52'; Ninua (yellow card) 90+4' | Stadium: Mikheil Meskhi-2 Stadium; Referee: Irakli Shengelia |

| 11 March 2026 3 | Dinamo Tbilisi | 0–0 | Rustavi | Tbilisi |
| 19:00 GET (UTC+4) | Osei (yellow card) 3'; Kharebashvili (yellow card) 32'; Santos (yellow card) 37'; Siradze (yellow card) 52'; Loria (yellow card) 72' | Report | Jean (penalty missed) 58'; Pami (yellow card) 61'; Gujabidze (yellow card) 79'; Iakobidze (yellow card) 80'; Oliveira (yellow card) 83'; Chikovani (yellow card) 90+3' | Stadium: Dinamo Arena; Referee: Guram Machitidze |

| 15 March 2026 4 | Iberia 1999 | 0–0 | Dinamo Tbilisi | Tbilisi |
| 18:00 GET (UTC+4) | Bidzinashvili (yellow card) 73'; Amisulashvili (yellow card) 75'; Selimović (yellow card) 90+5' | Report | Santos (yellow card) 57'; Gvasalia (yellow card) 90+2' | Stadium: Mikheil Meskhi Stadium; Referee: Goga Kikacheishvili |

| 3 April 2026 5 | Dinamo Tbilisi | 1–2 | Dila Gori | Tbilisi |
| 15:00 GET (UTC+4) | Gvasalia 45+2' | Report | Menteshashvili 20'; Museliani 57'; Jalagonia 90+5' | Stadium: Dinamo Arena; Referee: Irakli Kherkhadze |

| 7 April 2026 6 | Torpedo Kutaisi | 0–0 | Dinamo Tbilisi | Kutaisi |
| 21:00 GET (UTC+4) | Itrak (yellow card) 63' | Report | Ugrekhelidze (yellow card) 22' | Stadium: Ramaz Shengelia Stadium; Referee: Giorgi Kruashvili |

| 11 April 2026 1 | Dinamo Tbilisi | 2–2 | Dinamo Batumi | Tbilisi |
| 20:00 GET (UTC+4) | Doltmurziev 10'; Monteiro 73'; Zaria (yellow card) 86' | Report | Chiteishvili 3'; Mandrîcenco (yellow card) 20'; Kirkitadze 35'; Kobakhidze (yellow card) 48' | Stadium: Dinamo Arena; Referee: Irakli Shengelia |

| 17 April 2026 7 | Dinamo Tbilisi | 1–1 | Meshakhte Tkibuli | Tbilisi |
| 19:00 GET (UTC+4) | Donkor 28'; Kharebashvili (yellow card) 34'; Osei (yellow card) 37' (yellow-red card) 48' | Report | Patsatsia 32'; Jikia (yellow card) 59'; Ugrekhelidze (yellow card) 79'; Ghurtskaia (yellow card) 84' | Stadium: Dinamo Arena; Referee: Akaki Farjikia |

| 21 April 2026 8 | Dinamo Tbilisi | 0–1 | Gagra | Tbilisi |
| 19:00 GET (UTC+4) | Donkor (yellow card) 41'; Ugrekhelidze (yellow card) 76'; Kharebashvili (yellow card) 79' | Report | Skrypnyk (yellow card) 34'; Kekelidze 52'; Peikrishvili (yellow card) 90+5' | Stadium: Dinamo Arena; Referee: Koba Revazashvili |

| 25 April 2026 9 | Samgurali Tskaltubo | 1–2 | Dinamo Tbilisi | Tsqaltubo |
| 20:00 GET (UTC+4) | Shatirishvili (yellow card) 49'; Ryan (yellow card) 63' (goal) 82' | Report | Vatsadze 33' (pen.), 62'; Kharebashvili (yellow card) 63'; Zaria (yellow card) 67'; Siradze (red card) 69'; Makatsaria (yellow card) 90+3'; Ninua (yellow card) 90+7' | Stadium: 26 May Stadium; Referee: Goga Kikacheishvili |

| 2 May 2026 10 | Dinamo Batumi | 2–2 | Dinamo Tbilisi | Batumi |
| 19:00 GET (UTC+4) | Mylchenko 2'; Putkaradze (yellow card) 17'; Kalandarishvili 45' (pen.); Tsulukidze (yellow card) 53' | Report | Osei (yellow card) 13' (yellow-red card) 18'; Kalandadze 22'; Ugrekhelidze (yellow card) 44'; Ramos 47'; Gvasalia (yellow card) 74' | Stadium: Adjarabet Arena; Referee: Beka Kunchulia |

| 7 May 2026 11 | Dinamo Tbilisi | 2–1 | Spaeri | Tbilisi |
| 20:00 GET (UTC+4) | Ninua (yellow card) 8'; Donkor 28'; Vatsadze 34'; Zaria (yellow card) 90' | Report | Chagunava (yellow card) 20'; Golubiani 82' | Stadium: Dinamo Arena; Referee: Jenner Khorava |

| 11 May 2026 12 | Rustavi | 2–3 | Dinamo Tbilisi | Tbilisi |
| 21:00 GET (UTC+4) | Nakano 24'; Jackson 40' | Report | Yoro 1'; Monteiro 38'; Vatsadze 55'; Kvartskhava (yellow card) 90+6' | Stadium: David Petriashvili Arena; Referee: Tsotne Samsonashvili |

| 16 May 2026 13 | Dinamo Tbilisi | 2–0 | Iberia 1999 | Tbilisi |
| 19:00 GET (UTC+4) | Yoro (yellow card) 23' (goal) 45'; Donkor 33'; Kalandadze (yellow card) 87' | Report | Zohouri (yellow card) 7'; Dadiani (yellow card) 47' | Stadium: Dinamo Arena; Referee: Giorgi Kruashvili |

| 20 May 2026 14 | Dila Gori | 0–0 | Dinamo Tbilisi | Gori |
| 21:00 GET (UTC+4) | Parulava (yellow card) 42'; Menteshashvili (yellow card) 45'; Kikabidze (yellow card) 45+6' | Report | Donkor (yellow card) 36'; Ugrekhelidze (yellow card) 50'; Kurdić (yellow card) 85' | Stadium: Tengiz Burjanadze Stadium; Referee: Bakar Bregadze |

| 24 May 2026 15 | Dinamo Tbilisi | 0–1 | Torpedo Kutaisi | Tbilisi |
| 19:00 GET (UTC+4) | | Report | Pires 70' | Stadium: Dinamo Arena; Referee: Irakli Shengelia |

| 30 May 2026 16 | Meshakhte Tkibuli | 1–6 | Dinamo Tbilisi | Tsqaltubo |
| 16:00 GET (UTC+4) | Gabiskiria (yellow card) 22'; Chikhradze (yellow card) 29'; Ugrekhelidze (yellow card) 65'; Kvirkvia 73' | Report | Kurdić 5'; Vatsadze 20'; Ugrekhelidze 27'; Ramos (yellow card) 35'; Yoro 63', 83'; Kvaratskhelia (penalty missed) 67' (yellow card) 75'; Osei (yellow card) 70'; Siradze 87' | Stadium: 26 May Stadium; Referee: Giorgi Avazashvili |

| 14 June 2026 17 | Gagra | 2–1 | Dinamo Tbilisi | Tbilisi |
| 20:00 GET (UTC+4) | Andreychuk 9'; Peikrishvili 32' | Report | Santos 84' | Stadium: David Petriashvili Arena; Referee: Goga Kikacheishvili |

| 18 June 2026 18 | Dinamo Tbilisi | 5–3 | Samgurali Tskaltubo | Tbilisi |
| 20:00 GET (UTC+4) | Ramos 11'; Kalandadze 15'; Santos 48'; Doltmurziev 66'; Yoro 79'; Makatsaria (yellow card) 90+2' | Report | Wellissol 1', 37', 90+1' (pen.) (yellow card) 14'; Kvaratskhelia (yellow card) 73' | Stadium: David Petriashvili Arena; Referee: Aleko Aptsiauri |

| 23 June 2026 19 | Dinamo Tbilisi | 2–1 | Dinamo Batumi | Tbilisi |
| 21:00 GET (UTC+4) | Do Couto 75'; Ninua 87' (pen.) | Report | Mara 7'; Kapianidze (yellow card) 45+3'; Chiteishvili (yellow card) 88'; Kobakhidze (yellow card) 90+3' | Stadium: David Petriashvili Arena; Referee: Jenner Khorava |

| 8 August 2026 20 | Spaeri | 1–2 | Dinamo Tbilisi | Tbilisi |
| 17:00 GET (UTC+4) | Kokhreidze 31'; Bunturi (yellow card) 78' | Report | Kakashvili 73'; Vatsadze 75' | Stadium: Mikheil Meskhi-2 Stadium; Referee: Koba Revazashvili |

| 15 August 2026 21 | Dinamo Tbilisi | 0–3 | Rustavi | Tbilisi |
| 19:00 GET (UTC+4) | Houri (yellow card) 30'; Vatsadze (yellow card) 90+2' | Report | Jean 28'; P.Osei 38'; Kessi 45+1'; Iakobidze (yellow card) 85' | Stadium: Mikheil Meskhi-2 Stadium; Referee: Goga Kikacheishvili |

| 31 August 2026 23 | Dinamo Tbilisi | 2–1 | Dila Gori | Tbilisi |
| 21:00 GET (UTC+4) | Ninua 11' (yellow card) 51'; Vatsadze (yellow card) 56'; Do Couto 59' | Report | Diouf (yellow card) 29'; Anoff 69'; Jalagonia (yellow card) 90' | Stadium: Mikheil Meskhi Stadium; Referee: Aleko Aptsiauri |

| 6 September 2026 24 | Torpedo Kutaisi | 1–1 | Dinamo Tbilisi | Kutaisi |
| 20:00 GET (UTC+4) | Arabidze (yellow card) 56'; Pires 58'; Skorup (yellow card) 73' | Report | Psaltis (yellow card) 52'; Doltmurziev 70' | Stadium: Ramaz Shengelia Stadium; Referee: Jenner Khorava |

| 10 September 2026 25 | Dinamo Tbilisi | 0–0 | Meshakhte Tkibuli | Tbilisi |
| 19:00 GET (UTC+4) | Pourzitidis (yellow card) 20'; Kankava (yellow card) 30'; Ugrekhelidze (red card) 68' | Report | Kantaria (yellow card) 17'; Zotko (yellow card) 62' | Stadium: Mikheil Meskhi Stadium; Referee: Irakli Shengelia |

| 14 September 2026 26 | Dinamo Tbilisi | 4–0 | Gagra | Tbilisi |
| 21:00 GET (UTC+4) | Ninua 3'; Kharaishvili 35', 45'; Kurdić 65'; Kakashvili (yellow card) 90+2' | Report | Mujiri (yellow card) 30'; Augusto (yellow card) 44' (yellow-red card) 63'; Adeyeye (yellow card) 83' | Stadium: Mikheil Meskhi Stadium; Referee: Guram Machitidze |

| 19 September 2026 27 | Samgurali Tskaltubo | 2–3 | Dinamo Tbilisi | Tsqaltubo |
| 20:00 GET (UTC+4) | Gegetchkori 12' (pen.), 42'; Khorkheli (yellow card) 90+1'; Gilmore (yellow card) 90+5' | Report | Ninua (yellow card) 27' (goal) 74'; Do Couto 28'; Doltmurziev 37'; Flores (yellow card) 64'; Houri (yellow card) 90+5' | Stadium: 26 May Stadium; Referee: Giorgi Kruashvili |

| 4 October 2026 22 | Iberia 1999 | 1–2 | Dinamo Tbilisi | Tbilisi |
| 20:00 GET (UTC+4) | Kobuladze (yellow card) 46'; Jinjolava 79' (pen.); Natchkebia (yellow card) 80' | Report | Do Couto 9'; Pourzitidis (yellow card) 26'; Ugrekhelidze (yellow card) 53'; Vatsadze 71'; Flores (yellow card) 78' | Stadium: Mikheil Meskhi Stadium; Referee: Jenner Khorava |
Note: Match originally scheduled for 23 August, but postponed on 19 August due to Iberia 1999's involvement in the UEFA Europa League on 20 August, and rearranged to 4 October.

| 11 October 2026 28 | Dinamo Batumi | 1–0 | Dinamo Tbilisi | Batumi |
| 19:00 GET (UTC+4) | Maurides 44'; Altunashvili (yellow card) 62'; Turitsov (yellow card) 66'; Kalichava (yellow card) 90' | Report | Vatsadze (yellow card) 76'; Welton (yellow card) 79' | Stadium: Adjarabet Arena; Referee: Aleko Aptsiauri |

| 18 October 2026 29 | Dinamo Tbilisi | 3–1 | Spaeri | Tbilisi |
| 17:00 GET (UTC+4) | Ninua 21' (yellow card) 90+1'; Pourzitidis 69'; Vatsadze 79' | Report | Golubiani 64' | Stadium: Dinamo Arena; Referee: Irakli Kherkhadze |

| 23 October 2026 30 | Rustavi | 0–2 | Dinamo Tbilisi | Tbilisi |
| 20:00 GET (UTC+4) | Nakano (yellow card) 13'; Oliveira (yellow card) 62' | Report | Ninua 37' (pen.), 63'; Houri (yellow card) 56'; Osei (yellow card) 60' | Stadium: David Petriashvili Arena; Referee: Goga Kikacheishvili |

| 31 October 2026 31 | Dinamo Tbilisi | 0–0 | Iberia 1999 | Tbilisi |
| 19:00 GET (UTC+4) | Pourzitidis (yellow card) 44'; Ugrekhelidze (yellow card) 45+2'; Doltmurziev (yellow card) 71' | Report | Kobuladze (yellow card) 11'; Sikharulashvili (yellow card) 32'; Selimović (yellow card) 36'; Ende (yellow card) 69'; Amisulashvili (yellow card) 89'; Alhassan (yellow card) 90+3' | Stadium: Dinamo Arena; Referee: Giorgi Avazashvili |

| 8 November 2026 32 | Dila Gori | 0–2 | Dinamo Tbilisi | Gori |
| 19:00 GET (UTC+4) | Araújo (yellow card) 16' | Report | Bah 29'; Do Couto (yellow card) 35'; Vatsadze 52'; Houri (yellow card) 90+1' | Stadium: Tengiz Burjanadze Stadium; Referee: Aleko Aptsiauri |

| 20 November 2026 33 | Dinamo Tbilisi | – | Torpedo Kutaisi | Tbilisi |
| 20:00 GET (UTC+4) | | Report | | Stadium: Dinamo Arena |

==== League table ====
| Pos | Team | Pld | W | D | L | GF | GA | GD | Pts | Qualification or relegation |
|---|---|---|---|---|---|---|---|---|---|---|
| 1 | Iberia 1999 | 33 | 18 | 6 | 9 | 48 | 35 | +13 | 60 | Qualification for the Champions League first qualifying round |
| 2 | Dinamo Batumi | 32 | 17 | 8 | 7 | 56 | 40 | +16 | 59 | Qualification for the Conference League first qualifying round |
| 3 | Dinamo Tbilisi | 32 | 16 | 10 | 6 | 52 | 32 | +20 | 58 | |
| 4 | Rustavi | 32 | 16 | 8 | 8 | 40 | 28 | +12 | 56 | |
| 5 | Torpedo Kutaisi | 32 | 11 | 10 | 11 | 53 | 44 | +9 | 43 | |

Updated to match(es) played on 15 November 2026. Source: Erovnuli Liga, Soccerway
Rules for classification: 1) Points; 2) Goal difference; 3) Goals scored 4) Head-to-head points; 5) Head-to-head goal difference; 6) Head-to-head goals scored; 7) Head-to-head away goals scored (only if two teams).

=== Georgian Cup ===
| 26 July 2026 Round of 16 | Guria Lanchkhuti | 1–0 | Dinamo Tbilisi | Lanchkhuti |
| 16:30 GET (UTC+4) | Nozadze (yellow card) 27'; Chaganava 40'; Maisashvili (yellow card) 58' | Report | Vatsadze (yellow card) 42' | Stadium: Evgrapi Shevardnadze Stadium; Referee: Irakli Kherkhadze |

=== UEFA Europa Conference League ===
==== Qualifying rounds ====
| 9 July 2026 First qualifying round 1st leg | Mondorf-les-Bains (Luxembourg) | 1–2 | (Georgia (country)) Dinamo Tbilisi | Luxembourg City, Luxembourg |
| 21:15 GET (UTC+4) | Pelletier (yellow card) 24'; Far 71'; Kumbi (yellow card) 90+6' | Report | Bah 2'; Vatsadze 19'; Psaltis (yellow card) 22' | Stadium: Stade Achille Hammerel; Attendance: 1,219; Referee: Heini Ziskason Viðoy (Faroe Islands) |
Note: Mondorf-les-Bains played their home match at Stade Achille Hammerel in Luxembourg instead of their own stadium, Stade John Grün in Mondorf-les-Bains, which does not fulfill UEFA requirements.

| 16 July 2026 First qualifying round 2nd leg | Dinamo Tbilisi (Georgia (country)) | 1–1 (a.e.t.) (3–2 agg.) | (Luxembourg) Mondorf-les-Bains | Tbilisi, Georgia |
| 20:00 GET (UTC+4) | Kurdić (yellow card) 56'; Osei (yellow card) 58'; Bah (penalty missed) 65'; Ninua 111' (pen.) | Report | Estrada (yellow card) 47'; Couturier 87'; Knoepffler (yellow card) 111' | Stadium: Mikheil Meskhi Stadium; Attendance: 3,900; Referee: Gal Levi (Israel) |
Note: Dinamo Tbilisi played their home match at Mikheil Meskhi Stadium instead of their own stadium, Boris Paichadze Dinamo Arena.

| 23 July 2026 Second qualifying round 1st leg | Dinamo Tbilisi (Georgia (country)) | 3–0 | (Lithuania) Žalgiris | Tbilisi, Georgia |
| 21:00 GET (UTC+4) | Kurdić 14'; Santos 26'; Ugrekhelidze 30' | Report | Franke (yellow card) 36'; Lupano (yellow card) 44'; Capan (yellow card) 74' | Stadium: Mikheil Meskhi Stadium; Attendance: 4,728; Referee: Robin Hensgens (Netherlands) |
Note: Dinamo Tbilisi played their home match at Mikheil Meskhi Stadium instead of their own stadium, Boris Paichadze Dinamo Arena.

| 30 July 2026 Second qualifying round 2nd leg | Žalgiris (Lithuania) | 7–2 (7–5 agg.) | (Georgia (country)) Dinamo Tbilisi | Vilnius, Lithuania |
| 21:00 GET (UTC+4) | Petković (penalty missed) 9' 59', 73'; Bilenkyi 25', 82', 90'; Lupano (yellow card) 56'; Teixeira 61'; Bosančić (yellow card) 62'; Mihajlović 88'; Kendysh (yellow card) 90+2' | Report | Kalandadze (yellow card) 8'; Santos 40' (yellow card) 41'; Do Couto (yellow card) 68'; Vatsadze 72' (yellow card) 90+7'; Loria (yellow card) 74'; Bah (yellow card) 76' | Stadium: FK Zalgiris Stadium; Attendance: 4,722; Referee: Vlatko Ilioski (North Macedonia) |

== Squad statistics ==
As of match played 8 November 2026

=== Appearances and goals ===
| No. | Pos | Nat | Player | Total | | Erovnuli Liga | | Georgian Cup | | Super Cup | | UEFA Conference League | |
| No. | Pos | Nat | Player | Apps | Goals | Apps | Goals | Apps | Goals | Apps | Goals | Apps | Goals |
|---|---|---|---|---|---|---|---|---|---|---|---|---|---|
| 1 | GK | (Georgia (country)) GEO | Giorgi Loria | 20 | 0 | 15 | 0 | 0 | 0 | 1 | 0 | 4 | 0 |
| 2 | DF | (Georgia (country)) GEO | Giorgi Gvasalia | 9 | 1 | 9 | 1 | 0 | 0 | 0 | 0 | 0 | 0 |
| 3 | DF | (Georgia (country)) GEO | Aleksandre Kalandadze | 30 | 2 | 21+3 | 2 | 1 | 0 | 1 | 0 | 4 | 0 |
| 4 | DF | (Georgia (country)) GEO | Nikoloz Ugrekhelidze | 23 | 3 | 20+1 | 2 | 0 | 0 | 0 | 0 | 1+1 | 1 |
| 6 | DF | (Brazil) BRA | Léo Santos | 34 | 4 | 18+10 | 2 | 0 | 0 | 2 | 0 | 4 | 2 |
| 7 | FW | (Georgia (country)) GEO | Khalid Doltmurziev | 19 | 4 | 7+12 | 4 | 0 | 0 | 0 | 0 | 0 | 0 |
| 8 | MF | (Brazil) BRA | Welton | 13 | 0 | 11+2 | 0 | 0 | 0 | 0 | 0 | 0 | 0 |
| 10 | MF | (Georgia (country)) GEO | Giorgi Kharaishvili | 19 | 2 | 13+5 | 2 | 0 | 0 | 1 | 0 | 0 | 0 |
| 11 | FW | (Georgia (country)) GEO | Mate Vatsadze | 33 | 11 | 17+9 | 9 | 1 | 0 | 1+1 | 0 | 2+2 | 2 |
| 12 | FW | (Guinea) GUI | Algassime Bah | 10 | 2 | 3+1 | 1 | 0+1 | 0 | 0+1 | 0 | 4 | 1 |
| 13 | DF | (Greece) GRE | Marios Pourzitidis | 11 | 1 | 11 | 1 | 0 | 0 | 0 | 0 | 0 | 0 |
| 14 | MF | (France) FRA | Maxime Do Couto | 20 | 4 | 12+2 | 4 | 0 | 0 | 1+1 | 0 | 4 | 0 |
| 16 | MF | (Georgia (country)) GEO | Nikoloz Tkalia | 3 | 0 | 0 | 0 | 0+1 | 0 | 0 | 0 | 0+2 | 0 |
| 17 | DF | (Cyprus) CYP | Paris Psaltis | 17 | 0 | 10+1 | 0 | 1 | 0 | 0+1 | 0 | 4 | 0 |
| 18 | MF | (Georgia (country)) GEO | Tornike Kvaratskhelia | 19 | 0 | 1+12 | 0 | 0+1 | 0 | 1 | 0 | 2+2 | 0 |
| 20 | GK | (Brazil) BRA | Lucas Flores | 11 | 0 | 11 | 0 | 0 | 0 | 0 | 0 | 0 | 0 |
| 21 | MF | (Georgia (country)) GEO | Daniel Kvartskhava | 14 | 0 | 1+8 | 0 | 1 | 0 | 1+1 | 0 | 0+2 | 0 |
| 22 | MF | (Georgia (country)) GEO | Nika Ninua | 37 | 8 | 30 | 7 | 1 | 0 | 2 | 0 | 4 | 1 |
| 24 | MF | (Ghana) GHA | Barnes Osei | 32 | 0 | 23+3 | 0 | 0 | 0 | 2 | 0 | 4 | 0 |
| 26 | MF | (Georgia (country)) GEO | Gabriel Gogua | 2 | 0 | 0+1 | 0 | 0+1 | 0 | 0 | 0 | 0 | 0 |
| 27 | DF | (Bosnia and Herzegovina) BIH | Numan Kurdić | 35 | 3 | 28 | 2 | 1 | 0 | 2 | 0 | 4 | 1 |
| 28 | FW | (Georgia (country)) GEO | Rati Aleksidze | 2 | 0 | 0+1 | 0 | 0 | 0 | 1 | 0 | 0 | 0 |
| 29 | MF | (Georgia (country)) GEO | Reziko Danelia | 2 | 0 | 0 | 0 | 0 | 0 | 0+1 | 0 | 0+1 | 0 |
| 30 | DF | (Georgia (country)) GEO | Giorgi Lomidze | 6 | 0 | 0+6 | 0 | 0 | 0 | 0 | 0 | 0 | 0 |
| 31 | DF | (Georgia (country)) GEO | Levan Kharabadze | 6 | 0 | 2 | 0 | 1 | 0 | 1 | 0 | 0+2 | 0 |
| 32 | MF | (Georgia (country)) GEO | Luka Tsikolia | 11 | 0 | 1+4 | 0 | 0+1 | 0 | 2 | 0 | 1+2 | 0 |
| 33 | MF | (France) FRA | Lyes Houri | 15 | 0 | 2+11 | 0 | 1 | 0 | 0 | 0 | 0+1 | 0 |
| 34 | FW | (Nigeria) NGR | Matthew Gbomadu | 6 | 0 | 0+5 | 0 | 1 | 0 | 0 | 0 | 0 | 0 |
| 37 | GK | (Georgia (country)) GEO | Mikheil Makatsaria | 8 | 0 | 6 | 0 | 1 | 0 | 1 | 0 | 0 | 0 |
| 39 | MF | (Georgia (country)) GEO | Koba Kakashvili | 12 | 1 | 0+6 | 1 | 0 | 0 | 1+1 | 0 | 2+2 | 0 |
Players away from Dinamo Tbilisi II players:
| 16 | FW | (The Gambia) GAM | Abdoulie Njie | 1 | 0 | 0+1 | 0 | 0 | 0 | 0 | 0 | 0 | 0 |
Players away from Dinamo Tbilisi on loan:
Players who left Astana during the season:
| 5 | DF | (Georgia (country)) GEO | Saba Kharebashvili | 17 | 0 | 17 | 0 | 0 | 0 | 0 | 0 | 0 | 0 |
| 9 | MF | (Georgia (country)) GEO | Giorgi Zaria | 9 | 0 | 1+8 | 0 | 0 | 0 | 0 | 0 | 0 | 0 |
| 13 | FW | (Portugal) POR | Rodrigo Ramos | 14 | 2 | 10+4 | 2 | 0 | 0 | 0 | 0 | 0 | 0 |
| 17 | MF | (Ghana) GHA | Nana-Kofi Donkor | 14 | 3 | 9+5 | 3 | 0 | 0 | 0 | 0 | 0 | 0 |
| 19 | FW | (Georgia (country)) GEO | Irakli Siradze | 18 | 1 | 6+11 | 1 | 0 | 0 | 0+1 | 0 | 0 | 0 |
| 20 | FW | (Portugal) POR | Rui Monteiro | 14 | 3 | 11+2 | 3 | 0 | 0 | 0+1 | 0 | 0 | 0 |
| 23 | MF | (Georgia (country)) GEO | Jaba Kankava | 12 | 0 | 8+3 | 0 | 1 | 0 | 0 | 0 | 0 | 0 |
| 25 | MF | (England) ENG | Josh Onomah | 6 | 0 | 0+5 | 0 | 0 | 0 | 1 | 0 | 0 | 0 |
| 26 | MF | (Ivory Coast) CIV | Abdoulaye Yoro | 16 | 5 | 12+4 | 5 | 0 | 0 | 0 | 0 | 0 | 0 |
| 33 | MF | (Georgia (country)) GEO | Giorgi Kharebashvili | 12 | 0 | 6+6 | 0 | 0 | 0 | 0 | 0 | 0 | 0 |

=== Goal scorers ===
| Place | Position | Nation | Number | Name | Erovnuli Liga | Georgian Cup | Super Cup | UEFA Conference League | Total |
|---|---|---|---|---|---|---|---|---|---|
| 1 | FW | (Georgia (country)) | 11 | Mate Vatsadze | 9 | 0 | 0 | 2 | 11 |
| 2 | MF | (Georgia (country)) | 22 | Nika Ninua | 7 | 0 | 0 | 1 | 8 |
| 3 | MF | (Ivory Coast) | 26 | Abdoulaye Yoro | 5 | 0 | 0 | 0 | 5 |
| 4 | FW | (Georgia (country)) | 7 | Khalid Doltmurziev | 4 | 0 | 0 | 0 | 4 |
| 4 | MF | (France) | 14 | Maxime Do Couto | 4 | 0 | 0 | 0 | 4 |
| 4 | DF | (Brazil) | 6 | Léo Santos | 2 | 0 | 0 | 2 | 4 |
| 7 | FW | (Portugal) | 20 | Rui Monteiro | 3 | 0 | 0 | 0 | 3 |
| 7 | MF | (Ghana) | 17 | Nana-Kofi Donkor | 3 | 0 | 0 | 0 | 3 |
| 7 | MF | (Georgia (country)) | 4 | Nikoloz Ugrekhelidze | 2 | 0 | 0 | 1 | 3 |
| 7 | DF | (Bosnia and Herzegovina) | 27 | Numan Kurdić | 2 | 0 | 0 | 1 | 3 |
| 11 | DF | (Georgia (country)) | 3 | Aleksandre Kalandadze | 2 | 0 | 0 | 0 | 2 |
| 11 | FW | (Portugal) | 13 | Rodrigo Ramos | 2 | 0 | 0 | 0 | 2 |
| 11 | MF | (Georgia (country)) | 10 | Giorgi Kharaishvili | 2 | 0 | 0 | 0 | 2 |
| 11 | FW | (Guinea) | 12 | Algassime Bah | 1 | 0 | 0 | 1 | 2 |
| 14 | DF | (Georgia (country)) | 2 | Giorgi Gvasalia | 1 | 0 | 0 | 0 | 1 |
| 14 | FW | (Georgia (country)) | 19 | Irakli Siradze | 1 | 0 | 0 | 0 | 1 |
| 14 | MF | (Georgia (country)) | 39 | Koba Kakashvili | 1 | 0 | 0 | 0 | 1 |
| 14 | DF | (Greece) | 13 | Marios Pourzitidis | 1 | 0 | 0 | 0 | 1 |
| | | | | TOTALS | 51 | 0 | 0 | 8 | 59 |

=== Clean sheets ===
| Place | Position | Nation | Number | Name | Erovnuli Liga | Georgian Cup | Super Cup | UEFA Conference League | Total |
|---|---|---|---|---|---|---|---|---|---|
| 1 | GK | (Georgia (country)) | 1 | Giorgi Loria | 5 | 0 | 0 | 1 | 6 |
| 2 | GK | (Brazil) | 20 | Lucas Flores | 5 | 0 | 0 | 0 | 5 |
| 3 | GK | (Georgia (country)) | 37 | Mikheil Makatsaria | 0 | 0 | 1 | 0 | 1 |
| | | | | TOTALS | 10 | 0 | 1 | 1 | 12 |

=== Disciplinary record ===
| Number | Nation | Position | Name | Erovnuli Liga | | Georgian Cup | | Super Cup | | UEFA Conference League | | Total | |
| Number | Nation | Position | Name | Yellow card | Red card | Yellow card | Red card | Yellow card | Red card | Yellow card | Red card | Yellow card | Red card |
| 1 | (Georgia (country)) | GK | Giorgi Loria | 1 | 0 | 0 | 0 | 0 | 0 | 1 | 0 | 2 | 0 |
| 2 | (Georgia (country)) | DF | Giorgi Gvasalia | 2 | 0 | 0 | 0 | 0 | 0 | 0 | 0 | 2 | 0 |
| 3 | (Georgia (country)) | DF | Aleksandre Kalandadze | 1 | 0 | 0 | 0 | 0 | 0 | 1 | 0 | 2 | 0 |
| 4 | (Georgia (country)) | MF | Nikoloz Ugrekhelidze | 7 | 1 | 0 | 0 | 0 | 0 | 0 | 0 | 7 | 1 |
| 6 | (Brazil) | DF | Léo Santos | 2 | 0 | 0 | 0 | 1 | 0 | 1 | 0 | 4 | 0 |
| 7 | (Georgia (country)) | FW | Khalid Doltmurziev | 1 | 0 | 0 | 0 | 0 | 0 | 0 | 0 | 1 | 0 |
| 8 | (Brazil) | MF | Welton | 1 | 0 | 0 | 0 | 0 | 0 | 0 | 0 | 1 | 0 |
| 11 | (Georgia (country)) | FW | Mate Vatsadze | 3 | 0 | 1 | 0 | 1 | 0 | 1 | 0 | 6 | 0 |
| 12 | (Guinea) | FW | Algassime Bah | 0 | 0 | 0 | 0 | 0 | 0 | 1 | 0 | 1 | 0 |
| 13 | (Greece) | DF | Marios Pourzitidis | 3 | 0 | 0 | 0 | 0 | 0 | 0 | 0 | 3 | 0 |
| 14 | (France) | MF | Maxime Do Couto | 1 | 0 | 0 | 0 | 0 | 0 | 1 | 0 | 2 | 0 |
| 17 | (Cyprus) | DF | Paris Psaltis | 1 | 0 | 0 | 0 | 0 | 0 | 1 | 0 | 2 | 0 |
| 18 | (Georgia (country)) | FW | Tornike Kvaratskhelia | 1 | 0 | 0 | 0 | 0 | 0 | 0 | 0 | 1 | 0 |
| 20 | (Brazil) | GK | Lucas Flores | 2 | 0 | 0 | 0 | 0 | 0 | 0 | 0 | 2 | 0 |
| 21 | (Georgia (country)) | FW | Daniel Kvartskhava | 1 | 0 | 0 | 0 | 0 | 0 | 0 | 0 | 1 | 0 |
| 22 | (Georgia (country)) | MF | Nika Ninua | 6 | 0 | 0 | 0 | 0 | 0 | 0 | 0 | 6 | 0 |
| 24 | (Ghana) | MF | Barnes Osei | 7 | 2 | 0 | 0 | 2 | 0 | 1 | 0 | 10 | 2 |
| 27 | (Bosnia and Herzegovina) | DF | Numan Kurdić | 1 | 0 | 0 | 0 | 1 | 0 | 1 | 0 | 3 | 0 |
| 32 | (Georgia (country)) | MF | Luka Tsikolia | 0 | 0 | 0 | 0 | 2 | 0 | 0 | 0 | 2 | 0 |
| 33 | (France) | MF | Lyes Houri | 4 | 0 | 0 | 0 | 0 | 0 | 0 | 0 | 4 | 0 |
| 37 | (Georgia (country)) | GK | Mikheil Makatsaria | 2 | 0 | 0 | 0 | 0 | 0 | 0 | 0 | 2 | 0 |
| 39 | (Georgia (country)) | MF | Koba Kakashvili | 1 | 0 | 0 | 0 | 0 | 0 | 0 | 0 | 1 | 0 |
Players away on loan:
Players who left Dinamo Tbilisi during the season:
| 5 | (Georgia (country)) | DF | Saba Kharebashvili | 4 | 0 | 0 | 0 | 0 | 0 | 0 | 0 | 4 | 0 |
| 9 | (Georgia (country)) | MF | Giorgi Zaria | 3 | 0 | 0 | 0 | 0 | 0 | 0 | 0 | 3 | 0 |
| 13 | (Portugal) | FW | Rodrigo Ramos | 1 | 0 | 0 | 0 | 0 | 0 | 0 | 0 | 1 | 0 |
| 17 | (Ghana) | MF | Nana-Kofi Donkor | 2 | 0 | 0 | 0 | 0 | 0 | 0 | 0 | 2 | 0 |
| 19 | (Georgia (country)) | FW | Irakli Siradze | 1 | 1 | 0 | 0 | 0 | 0 | 0 | 0 | 1 | 1 |
| 23 | (Georgia (country)) | MF | Jaba Kankava | 1 | 0 | 0 | 0 | 0 | 0 | 0 | 0 | 1 | 0 |
| 26 | (Ivory Coast) | MF | Abdoulaye Yoro | 1 | 0 | 0 | 0 | 0 | 0 | 0 | 0 | 1 | 0 |
| 33 | (Georgia (country)) | MF | Giorgi Kharebashvili | 1 | 0 | 0 | 0 | 0 | 0 | 0 | 0 | 1 | 0 |
| | | | TOTALS | 61 | 4 | 1 | 0 | 7 | 0 | 9 | 0 | 78 | 4 |
