= Kalandadze =

Kalandadze (Georgian: კალანდაძე) is a Georgian surname. Notable people with the surname include:

- Aleksandre Kalandadze (born 2001), Georgian footballer
- Ana Kalandadze (1924–2008), Georgian poet
- Giorgi Kalandadze (born 1980), retired Georgian Brigadier General
- Helen Kalandadze, television presenter and singer from Georgia
- Mariam Kalandadze (born 2000), Georgian footballer
- Nino Kalandadze (born 1977), Georgian politician, lawyer, diplomat, and civil society leader
