= Kharebashvili =

Kharebashvili (Georgian: ხარებაშვილი) is a Georgian surname. Notable people with the surname include:

- Giorgi Kharebashvili (born 1996), Georgian footballer
- Saba Kharebashvili (born 2008), Georgian footballer
