= Lelo =

LELO is a Swedish company that designs and sells upmarket sex toys.

Lelo may also refer to:

- Lelo (newspaper), a Georgian language sports newspaper
- Lelo, a style of Georgian wine
- Lelo, a try in the game of rugby union
- Lelo burti, literally "field ball", a Georgian sport similar to rugby union
- Lelo Saracens, a Georgian rugby union club
- Lelo for Georgia, a Georgian political party
