= 2026 Georgian Super Cup =

Football tournament in Georgia

Tournament details
- Host country: Georgia
- Dates: 27 June - 1 July 2026
- Teams: 4

Final positions
- Champions: Torpedo Kutaisi (4th title)
- Runners-up: FC Iberia 1999

Tournament statistics
- Matches played: 4
- Goals scored: 6 (1.5 per match)

The 2026 Georgian Super Cup was the 25th edition of the Georgian Super Cup, an annual football competition for clubs in the Georgian football league system that were successful in its major competitions in the preceding season. It was the fourth edition of the tournament under the new format with four teams.

== Qualification ==
=== Qualified teams ===
The following four teams qualified for the tournament.

Team	Method of qualification	Appearance	Last appearance as	Years performance			
Team	Method of qualification	Appearance	Last appearance as	Winner(s)	Runners-up	Third	Fourth
FC Iberia 1999	2025 Erovnuli Liga winners	5th	2024 Erovnuli Liga winners	1	1	–	2
Dila Gori	2025 Erovnuli Liga runners-up	5th	2024 Erovnuli Liga third place	1	2	–	1
Dila Gori	2025 Georgian Cup winners	5th	2024 Erovnuli Liga third place	1	2	–	1
Torpedo Kutaisi	2025 Erovnuli Liga third place	8th	2024 Erovnuli Liga runners-up	3	2	2	–
Dinamo Tbilisi	2025 Erovnuli Liga fouth place	15th	2023 Erovnuli Liga runners-up	9	5	–	–

== Matches ==
=== Bracket ===
Semi-finals
27 June 2026 – Tbilisi
FC Iberia 1999	1
Dinamo Tbilisi	0
27 June 2026 – Gori
Dila Gori	0
Torpedo Kutaisi	1

Final
1 July 2026 – Tbilisi
FC Iberia 1999	2 (5)
Torpedo Kutaisi	2 (6)
Third place
1 July 2026 – Gori
Dinamo Tbilisi	0 (4)
Dila Gori	0 (2)

=== Semi-finals ===
27 June 2026
19:00 (UTC+4)

FC Iberia 1999	1–0	Dinamo Tbilisi
Bedoshvili 12'

Mikheil Meskhi Stadium, Tbilisi
Referee: Tsotne Samsonashvili
27 June 2026
21:00 (UTC+4)

Dila Gori	0–1	Torpedo Kutaisi
		Mamuchashvili 73'

Tengiz Burjanadze Stadium, Gori
Referee: Aleko Aptsiauri

=== Match for third place ===
1 July 2026
20:00

Dinamo Tbilisi	0–0	Dila Gori
Penalties
Ninua (penalty scored); Leo Santos (penalty scored); Bah (penalty scored); Do Couto (penalty scored)	4–2	(penalty scored) Menteshashvili; (penalty missed) Gogoberishvili; (penalty scored) Parulava; (penalty missed) Kouakou

Tengiz Burjanadze Stadium, Gori
Referee: Davit Butiashvili

=== Final ===
1 July 2026
20:00

FC Iberia 1999	2–2	Torpedo Kutaisi
Bedoshvili 37'; Dadiani 75'		Andric 5'; Arabidze 34'
Penalties
(penalty scored) Zohouri; (penalty scored) Dadiani; (penalty scored) Kobuladze; (penalty scored) Jinjolava; (penalty scored) Gudushauri; (penalty missed) Sikharulashvili	5–6	(penalty scored) Andric; (penalty scored) Pires; (penalty scored) Mamuchashvili; (penalty scored) Pinso; (penalty scored) Šimić; (penalty scored) Deisadze

Mikheil Meskhi Stadium, Tbilisi
Referee: Giorgi Avazashvili

== See also ==
- 2025 Erovnuli Liga
- 2025 Georgian Cup
