= Tornike Kvaratskhelia =

Georgian footballer (born 2008)

Personal information
- Date of birth: 7 February 2010 (age 16)
- Place of birth: Tbilisi, Georgia
- Position: Winger

Team information
- Current team: Dinamo
- Number: 18

Youth career
- –2025: Inter Academy Georgia
- 2026–: Dinamo Tbilisi

Senior career*
Years	Team	Apps	(Gls)
2026–	Dinamo Tbilisi	1	(0)

International career^{‡}
2025–	Georgia U16	3	(2)
2025–	Georgia U17	6	(0)
- * Club domestic league appearances and goals ‡ National team caps and goals as of 30 October 2025

Tornike Kvaratskhelia (Georgian: თორნიკე კვარაცხელია; born 7 February 2010) is a Georgian professional footballer who plays as a winger for Dinamo.

== Early life ==
Kvaratskhelia was born on 7 February 2010. The son of Azerbaijan international Badri Kvaratskhelia, he is the younger brother of Georgia international Khvicha Kvaratskhelia.

== Club career ==
As a youth player, Kvaratskhelia joined the youth academy of Georgian side Inter Academy Georgia. Following his stint there, he joined the youth academy of Georgian side Dinamo ahead of the 2026 season and was promoted to the club's senior team the same year. In May 2026, he trained at Bayern Munich campus and played for their under-17 side, scoring a goal in a 3–0 friendly win against a Global Academy team managed by Klaus Augenthaler.

== International career ==
Kvaratskhelia is a Georgia youth international. During the autumn of 2025, he played for the Georgia national under-17 football team for 2026 UEFA European Under-17 Championship qualification.

== Style of play ==
Kvaratskhelia plays as a winger. Italian news website Calciomercato.com wrote in 2025 "outside touches, blistering dribbling, swerving, and pace: these are Tornike's best skills. He also has a brilliant shot, which... has led him to score important goals from set pieces".

== Club statistics ==
As of match played 16 May 2026

Appearances and goals by club, season and competition
Club	Season	League			National cup (Note: Includes Georgian Cup)		Continental		Other		Total	
Club	Season	Division	Apps	Goals	Apps	Goals	Apps	Goals	Apps	Goals	Apps	Goals
Dinamo Tbilisi	2026	Erovnuli Liga	1	0	0	0	0 (Note: Appearances in UEFA Conference League)	0	—		1	0
Career total			1	0	0	0	0	0	0	0	1	0
