= 2026–27 İstanbul Başakşehir F.K. season =

İstanbul Başakşehir
2026–27 season
- President: Göksel Gümüşdağ
- Head coach: Nuri Şahin
- Stadium: Başakşehir Fatih Terim Stadium
- Süper Lig: 12th
- Turkish Cup: Fifth round
- Conference League: Second qualifying round
- Top goalscorer: League: Eldor Shomurodov (6); All: Eldor Shomurodov (6)
- Biggest win: İstanbul Başakşehir 4–0 Gençlerbirliği
- Biggest defeat: Amed 5–0 İstanbul Başakşehir

The 2026–27 season is Başakşehir's nineteenth consecutive season in the Süper Lig and their 37th year in existence. This season, Başakşehir is participating in the Süper Lig, Turkish Cup and Conference League.

== In ==
Date from	Position	Nationality	Name	From	Fee	Ref.
1 July 2026	DF	(Poland)	Michał Karbownik	(Germany) Hertha BSC	Undisclosed	
1 July 2026	MF	(Bosnia and Herzegovina)	Edin Višća	(Turkey) Trabzonspor	Undisclosed	
1 July 2026	FW	(Uzbekistan)	Eldor Shomurodov	(Italy) Roma	€2,800,000	
9 July 2026	DF	(Turkey)	Emin Bayram	(Belgium) Westerlo	€4,000,000	
28 July 2026	MF	(Denmark)	Andreas Skov Olsen	(Germany) Wolfsburg	Loan	
29 July 2026	FW	(Turkey)	Umut Bozok	(Turkey) Eyüpspor	Undisclosed	
3 September 2026	DF	(Georgia (country))	Saba Kharebashvili	(Georgia (country)) Dinamo Tbilisi	€2,500,000	

== Out ==
Date from	Position	Nationality	Name	From	Fee	Ref.
8 July 2026	GK	(Turkey)	Doğan Alemdar	(Turkey) Beşiktaş	€2M	
28 July 2026	DF	(Turkey)	Emre Kaplan	(Turkey) Bodrum	€100,000	
13 August 2026	MF	(Portugal)	Matchoi Djaló	(Portugal) Nacional	€200,000	
28 August 2026	MF	(Turkey)	Onur İnan	(Turkey) Kütahyaspor	€50,000	

== Competitions ==
=== Overall record ===
Competition	First match	Last match	Starting round	Final position	Record							
Competition	First match	Last match	Starting round	Final position	Pld	W	D	L	GF	GA	GD	Win %
Süper Lig	16 August 2026	TBD	Matchday 1		6	2	1	3	10	11	−1	33.33
Turkish Cup	December 2026	TBD	Fifth round						—			
Conference League	22 July 2026	30 July 2026	Second qualifying round	Second qualifying round	2	0	1	1	1	3	−2	0.00
Total					8	2	2	4	11	14	−3	25.00

Source: Competitions

=== Süper Lig ===
==== League table ====
Pos	Team	Pld	W	D	L	GF	GA	GD	Pts
10	Gaziantep	6	2	2	2	7	7	0	8
11	Çorum	6	2	1	3	13	12	+1	7
12	Başakşehir	6	2	1	3	10	11	−1	7
13	Gençlerbirliği	6	2	1	3	5	13	−8	7
14	Erzurumspor	6	2	1	3	3	11	−8	7

Updated to match(es) played on 20 September 2026. Source: Süper Lig
Rules for classification: 1) Points; 2) Head-to-head points; 3) Head-to-head goal difference; 4) Head-to-head goals scored; 5) Goal difference; 6) Goals scored; 7) Play-off.
(Note: Head-to-head record is used only after all the matches between the teams in question have been played)

==== Result summary ====
Overall								Home						Away					
Pld	W	D	L	GF	GA	GD	Pts	W	D	L	GF	GA	GD	W	D	L	GF	GA	GD
6	2	1	3	10	11	−1	7	2	1	1	9	4	+5	0	0	2	1	7	−6

Last updated: 19 September 2026.
Source: TFF.org

Pld = Matches played; W = Matches won; D = Matches drawn; L = Matches lost; GF = Goals for; GA = Goals against; GD = Goal difference; Pts = Points

==== Results by round ====
Round	1	2	3	4	5	6	7	8	9	10	11	12	13	14	15	16	17	18	19	20	21	22	23	24	25	26	27	28	29	30	31	32	33	34
Ground	H	A	H	H	A	H	A	H	A	H	A	H	A	H	A	H	A	A	H	A	A	H	A	H	A	H	A	H	A	H	A	H	A	H
Result	W	L	D	D	D	W																												
Position	2	10	9	12	13	12																												

Updated to match(es) played on 19 September 2026. Source: TFF.org
A = Away; H = Home; W = Win; D = Draw; L = Loss; P = Postponed

==== Matches ====
16 August 2026 1	İstanbul Başakşehir	2–0	Kocaelispor	Istanbul
19:00 TRT (UTC+3)	Operi 14'; Shomurodov 72'	Report		Stadium: Başakşehir Fatih Terim Stadium; Referee: Mehmet Türkmen

23 August 2026 2	Trabzonspor	2–1	İstanbul Başakşehir	Trabzon
19:00 TRT (UTC+3)	Salah 8', 48'	Report	Shomurodov 19' (pen.)	Stadium: Papara Park; Referee: Ali Şansalan

30 August 2026 3	İstanbul Başakşehir	1–1	Kasımpaşa	Istanbul
21:30 TRT (UTC+3)	Shomurodov 18'	Report	Diabate 81'	Stadium: Başakşehir Fatih Terim Stadium; Referee: Halil Umut Meler

4 September 2026 4	İstanbul Başakşehir	2–3	Galatasaray	Istanbul
20:00 TRT (UTC+3)	Shomurodov 66'; Sánchez 76' (o.g.)	Report	Osimhen 17'; Torreira 71'; Sara 90+1'	Stadium: Başakşehir Fatih Terim Stadium; Referee: Kadir Sağlam

13 September 2026 5	Amed	5–0	İstanbul Başakşehir	Diyarbakır
20:00 TRT (UTC+3)	Bayram 45+1' (o.g.); Orban 52', 55', 75'; Diagne 84'	Report		Stadium: Diyarbakır Stadium; Referee: Cihan Aydın

19 September 2026 6	İstanbul Başakşehir	4–0	Gençlerbirliği	Istanbul
20:00 TRT (UTC+3)	Olsen 8'; Shomurodov 33', 65'; Selke 53' (pen.)	Report		Stadium: Başakşehir Fatih Terim Stadium; Referee: Atilla Karaoğlan

11 October 2026 7	Konyaspor	v	İstanbul Başakşehir	Konya
13:30 TRT (UTC+3)		Report		Stadium: Konya Municipality Stadium

18 October 2026 8	İstanbul Başakşehir	v	Gaziantep	Istanbul
19:00 TRT (UTC+3)		Report		Stadium: Başakşehir Fatih Terim Stadium

26 October 2026 9	Beşiktaş	v	İstanbul Başakşehir	Istanbul
19:00 TRT (UTC+3)		Report		Stadium: Beşiktaş Stadium

1 November 2026 10	İstanbul Başakşehir	v	Samsunspor	Samsun
16:00 TRT (UTC+3)		Report		Stadium: Samsun 19 May Stadium

7 November 2026 11	Göztepe	v	İstanbul Başakşehir	İzmir
19:00 TRT (UTC+3)		Report		Stadium: Gürsel Aksel Stadium

23 November 2026 12	İstanbul Başakşehir	v	Çorum	Istanbul
20:00 TRT (UTC+3)		Report		Stadium: Başakşehir Fatih Terim Stadium

29 November 2026 13	Eyüpspor	v	İstanbul Başakşehir	Istanbul
16:00 TRT (UTC+3)		Report		Stadium: Esenyurt Necmi Kadıoğlu Stadium

5 December 2026 14	İstanbul Başakşehir	v	Fenerbahçe	Istanbul
19:00 TRT (UTC+3)		Report		Stadium: Başakşehir Fatih Terim Stadium

13 December 2026 15	Çaykur Rizespor	v	İstanbul Başakşehir	Rize
16:00 TRT (UTC+3)		Report		Stadium: Rize City Stadium

19 December 2026 16	İstanbul Başakşehir	v	Erzurumspor	Istanbul
16:00 TRT (UTC+3)		Report		Stadium: Başakşehir Fatih Terim Stadium

=== Turkish Cup ===
5T	v
TRT (GMT+3)

=== UEFA Conference League ===
==== Second qualifying round ====
22 July 2026 First leg	İstanbul Başakşehir (Turkey)	1–1	(Finland) Inter Turku	Istanbul, Turkey
20:45 (UTC+3)	Ba (yellow card) 46'; Bayram 54'	Report	Jephta 16'; Tuominen (yellow card) 75'; Laine (yellow card) 90+2'	Stadium: Başakşehir Fatih Terim Stadium; Referee: Juan Martínez Munuera (Spain)

30 July 2026 Second leg	FC Inter Turku (Finland)	2–0	(Turkey) İstanbul Başakşehir	Turku, Finland
(UTC+3)	Tuominen 18'; Jephta 47'; Laine (yellow card) 50'; Tuominen (yellow card) 55'; Laine (red card) 88'	Report	Ba (yellow card) 10'; Bulut (yellow card) 84'	Stadium: Kupittaa Football Stadium; Referee: Nathan Verboomen (Belgium)
