= Otar Parulava =

Georgian footballer (born 2001)

Personal information
- Date of birth: 14 March 2001 (age 25)
- Place of birth: Tbilisi, Georgia
- Height: 1.78 m (5 ft 10 in)
- Position: Midfielder

Team information
- Current team: Dila
- Number: 10

Youth career
- –2019: Dinamo Tbilisi

Senior career*
Years	Team	Apps	(Gls)
2020	Dinamo Tbilisi-2		
2021	Saburtalo-2	10	(1)
2021–2022	Gagra	49	(3)
2023–	Dila	76	(6)

International career^{‡}
2022–2023	Georgia U19	2	(0)
2024–	Georgia U21	1	(0)
- * Club domestic league appearances and goals as of 7 May 2026 ‡ National team caps and goals as of 27 May 2025

Otar Parulava (Georgian: ოთარ ფარულავა, born 14 March 2001) is a Georgian professional footballer who plays as an attacking midfielder for Erovnuli Liga club Dila.

By advancing from the 5th division to the top-flight within two years, Parulava showed the potential to develop into a key player in Dila's midfield.

He is the winner of the Georgian Cup and the Super Cup with Dila.

== Club career ==
A product of Dinamo Tbilisi academy, Parulava initially played in U17 and U19 leagues before being promoted to the reserve team called Dinamo-2. In 2020, he was a member of the team that completed the Regionuli Liga tournament unbeaten on top of the table and advanced to Liga 4.

Parulava spent half of the next season at Liga 3 side Saburtalo-2, scoring his first professional goal in a 2–1 win over Guria on 18 June 2021. In the autumn of 2021, he moved to Erovnuli Liga 2 club Gagra and helped them gain promotion to the top tier.

In 2022, Parulava not only made appearances in the Erovnuli Liga but also was the youngest among seven players who took part in each of the league games. Sports newspaper Lelo named him one of the discoveries of this season.

In January 2023, Parulava left Gagra to join Dila. In the summer, he made his debut in European football and netted in a 3–1 win over Ukrainian side Vorskla in the 2nd qualifying round of the 2023–24 UEFA Conference League.

In the first half of 2025, Parulava contributed to Dila's successful league campaign with three goals. He was also four times included in Team of the Week. As Dila finished as runners-up of the league season and won the national and super cups, Parulava participated in 41 matches in these competitions, scoring six times.

== International ==
Parulava was first called up to the national U18 team in 2018.

In February 2020, he took part in two friendly matches against Tajikistan and N.Macedonia as a U19 player. The next autumn, Parulava received a call-up from the U21s for a friendly tie against England. He made his debut for the team in a friendly 1–0 win over Latvia held in Belek on 26 March 2023.

== Career statistics ==
As of 6 May 2026

Appearances and goals by club, season and competition
Club	Season	League			National cup		European		Other		Total	
Club	Season	Division	Apps	Goals	Apps	Goals	Apps	Goals	Apps	Goals	Apps	Goals
Saburtalo-2	2021	Liga 3	10	1	1	0	—		—		11	1
Gagra	2021	Erovnuli Liga 2	13	1	1	1	—		—		14	2
Gagra	2022	Erovnuli Liga	36	2	1	0	—		2 (Note: Appearances in Erovnuli Liga playoffs)	0	39	2
Gagra	Total		49	3	2	1	0	0	2	0	53	4
Dila	2023	Erovnuli Liga	12	0	—		6 (Note: Appearances in UEFA Conference League qualifiers)	1	—		18	1
Dila	2024	Erovnuli Liga	22	0	—		—		1 (Note: Appearances in Georgian Super Cup)	0	23	0
Dila	2025	Erovnuli Liga	32	5	3	0	4	0	2	1	41	6
Dila	2026	Erovnuli Liga	10	1	0	0	0	0	0	0	10	1
Dila	Total		76	6	3	0	10	1	3	1	92	7
Career total			125	10	6	1	10	1	5	1	146	13

== Honours ==
Dinamo Tbilisi

- Regionuli Liga winner: 2020

Gagra

- Erovnuli Liga 2 runner-up: 2021

Dila

- Georgian Cup winner: 2025
- Super Cup winner: 2025
- Erovnuli Liga runner-up: 2025
