= Zaza Bibilashvili =

Georgian lawyer, writer, publicist and politician

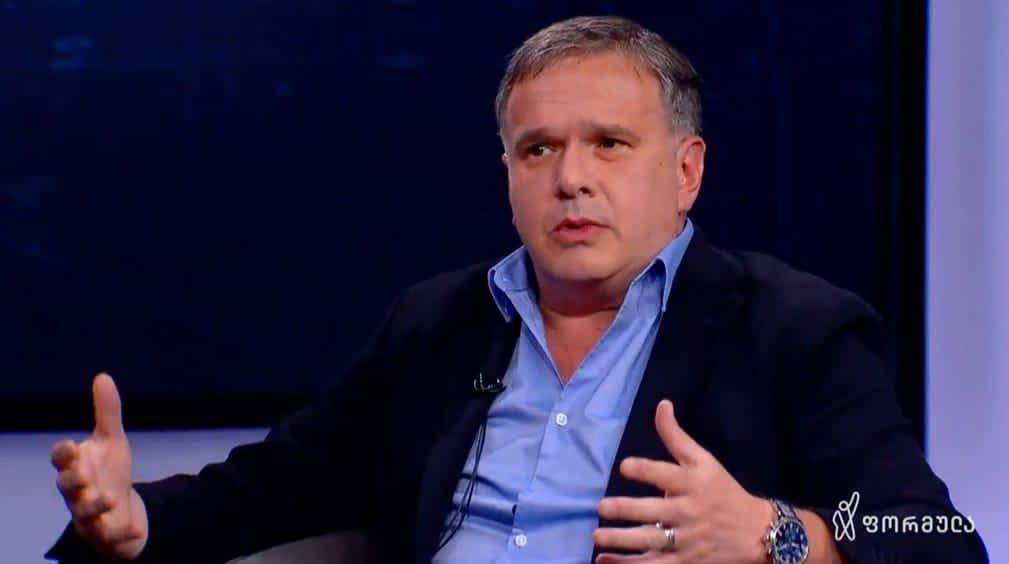
- Zaza Bibilashvili, 2024
- Born: Zaza Bibilashvili; August 16, 1974 (age 52); Tbilisi, Georgia
- Occupations: Lawyer, publicist, politician
- Known for: Co-founder of Ilia Chavchavadze Center for European Studies and Civic Education
- Spouse: Nino Kalandadze
- Children: 6

Georgian lawyer, writer, publicist and former politician Zaza Bibilashvili (Georgian: ზაზა ბიბილაშვილი; born August 16, 1974) is a Georgian lawyer, writer, publicist and former politician. He is the cofounder and chairman of the Ilia Chavchavadze Center for European Studies and Civic Education, the founder and Senior Partner of BGI Legal, and Chairman of the Georgian Richard Wagner Society.

== Early life and education ==
Bibilashvili was born in Tbilisi, Georgia. He attended Secondary School #55 in Tbilisi and the experimental music school at Tbilisi State Conservatoire. In 1989, he participated in a one-year study program in the United States, attending Bennett High School and the Calasanctius School in Buffalo, New York.

Bibilashvili studied international law at Tbilisi State University from 1990 to 1995. During this period, he also attended Oglethorpe University in Atlanta, Georgia on a Georgia Rotary Student Program scholarship (1993-1994) and Canisius University in Buffalo, New York, where he earned a B.A. in international relations and French in 1995.

== Legal career ==
Bibilashvili began his legal career with Georgian Consulting Group (GCG) in 1995. He became the director of GCG Law in 2000 and continued as director of EY Law Tbilisi following GCG's acquisition by Ernst & Young in 2002. In 2005, Bibilashvili founded BGI Legal.

Throughout his career, Bibilashvili has acted as an arbitrator in International Chamber of Commerce ( ICC ) international court of arbitrations based in Vienna, Zurich, and London. He was a founding member of the Georgian Bar Association (GBA), serving on its Executive Board from 2009 to 2013, where he chaired the Commercial Law Committee. Since 2009, he has been a Board Member of ICC Georgia, where he previously chaired the Arbitration Commission. Bibilashvili was also one of the original founders of the Association of Georgian Law Firms (AGLF), serving on its board from 2014 to 2017, during which he led Georgia's first-ever Pro Bono initiative.

Zaza Bibilashvili is described as a "formidable and brilliant lawyer, with outstanding problem-solving attitude, proactive approach in solving disputes and high business acumen" by Chambers Global 2020. Chambers Europe 2024, which ranks Bibilashvili as a Senior Statesperson, describes him as a "lawyer with decades of experience, who executes flawlessly." According to Chambers Europe 2025, "Zaza is a world-class legal adviser."

During 2009-2010, Bibilashvili served as a member of the State Constitutional Commission.

== Party Politics ==
Zaza Bibilashvili became actively involved in party politics in October 2013, joining the United National Movement (UNM), one year after its defeat in Georgia's general elections to the Georgian Dream (GD) Coalition. At a time when the UNM was facing significant challenges, Bibilashvili joined its board. In a 2015 international conference, he explained his decision to engage in politics, citing concerns over Russian influence in Georgia's political landscape.

During his time with the UNM, Bibilashvili took on various roles, including publishing the Georgian Gazette (2015-2016) and initiating the "Send a Bill to Ivanishvili" movement. In 2016, he led efforts to reform the party, focusing on transparency and internal democracy, and was elected Vice Chair of the Political Council. In May 2018, he separated from the party and officially resigned from his position and membership in February 2020.

Bibilashvili's political work centered on addressing Russian influence in Georgia and advocating for countering disinformation and promoting Western values.

== Public activities ==
Bibilashvili co-founded the Ilia Chavchavadze Center for European Studies and Civic Education in 2018. The Center aims to promote active citizenship, civic engagement, and democratic values in Georgia. Its Civic Memory Program focuses on the first half of Georgia’s independence period, providing a comprehensive historical perspective to help youth and others form objective judgments about the political context and alternatives of that era. Additionally, the Center aids vulnerable groups and active citizens in identifying and countering Russian disinformation by recognizing it and developing effective counternarratives.

He is the founder and editor-in-chief of the quarterly magazine Akhali Iveria since 2022. The Center has produced documentaries on Georgian history and current affairs, including a series on Georgia from 1991 to 2003 and a documentary on disinformation narratives related to Soviet nostalgia.

Bibilashvili has authored several books and reports on Georgian politics and society. He frequently speaks at national and international forums and has served as a lecturer for various organizations on topics such as civic memory, political parties, and public speaking.

=== Wagner Society ===
Bibilashvili co-founded the Georgian Richard Wagner Society in 2013. The Society has translated and published four books related to Wagner's work into Georgian.

== Personal life ==
Bibilashvili is married to Nino Kalandadze . He has six children from three marriages.

== Honors and awards ==
- Will Watt Fellow (1994)
- Paul Harris Fellow, Rotary International (1995)
- Order of Honors, Georgia (2012)

== Publications ==
Bibilashvili has authored several fiction and nonfiction books as well as reports and publications on Georgian politics and society.

=== Fiction ===
- Bibilashvili, Zaza (2023). Delirium. Publishing House Intellect. ISBN 978-9941-31-609-8
- Bibilashvili, Zaza (2019). Ten-Second Dreams. Publishing House Intellect. ISBN 978-9941-482-72-4.
- Bibilashvili, Zaza (2014). Drusilla. Bakur Sulakauri Publishing.ISBN 978-9941-23-247-3.

=== Books ===
- Bibilashvili, Zaza (2023). Georgian Matrix : Political Analysis and Dialogues. T̕bilisi: Intelek̕ti Publisher. ISBN 978-9941-31-608-1.
- Bibilashvili, Zaza (2020). In a Slightly More Self-Respecting Country. Publishing House Intellekti ISBN 978-9941-482-73-1

=== Reports ===
- Power Shifts in Post-Soviet States: Political Opportunities and the Role of Political Parties - Comparative Analysis (co-author, 2024)
- Kalandadze, Nino; Bibilashvili, Zaza; Jokhadze, Giorgi; Kharebava, Giorgi (2023). The Time to Gather Stones: Overcoming Georgia's Two-party Divide (PDF) (Report). Ilia Chavchavadze Center for European Studies and Civic Education. ISBN 978-9941-8-6148-2.
- Bibilashvili, Zaza; Kharebava, Giorgi; Jokhadze, Giorgi; Kalandadze, Nino (2023). On the Frontline: Countering Disinformation in Georgia (PDF) (Report). Ilia Chavchavadze Center for European Studies and Civic Education. ISBN 978-9941-8-5991-5.
- კრიტიკული აზროვნება, მართლმსაჯულება და მოქალაქეობა [Critical Thinking, Justice and Citizenship] (PDF) (Report). Center for European Studies and Civic Education. 2022. ISBN 978-9941-504-23-5.
- Gersamia, Mariam; Japaridze, Gaioz; Kalandadze, Nino; Kharebava, Giorgi; Jokhadze, Giorgi (2020). Bibilashvili, Zaza (ed.). Intra-party Democracy in Georgia (PDF) (Report). Ilia Chavchavadze Center for European Studies and Civic Education. ISBN 978-9941-31-283-0.
- Kharebava, Giorgi; Jokhadze, Giorgi; Japaridze, Gia; Kalandadze, Nino (2022). Bibilashvili, Zaza (ed.). Causes of the Intra-party Democracy Deficit in Georgia (PDF) (Report). Tbilisi: Ilia Chavchavadze Center for European Studies and Civic Education.
- Jokhadze, Giorgi; Kharebava, Giorgi; Japaridze, Gia; Kalandadze, Nino (2020). Bibilashvili, Zaza (ed.). Consequences of Deficit of Intra-party Democracy in Georgia (PDF) (Report). Ilia Chavchavadze Center for European Studies and Civic Education.
- Khutsishvili, Teimuraz; Kalandadze, Nino; Japaridze, Gaioz; Jokhadze, Giorgi; Kharebava, Giorgi (2020). Bibilashvili, Zaza (ed.). Liberalism and Georgia (PDF) (Report). Ilia Chavchavadze Center for European Studies and Civic Education. ISBN 978-9941-31-292-2.
- Bibilashvili, Zaza, Paitchadze David (2014) – The Ivanishvili Calendar
