= Tamaz Chakhvadze Stadium =

- Interactive map of Tamaz Chakhvadze Stadium
- Location: Chibati Lanchkhuti,georgia
- Coordinates: 42°04′55.5″N 41°59′00.3″E
- Owner: Lanchkhuti Municipality Sport Centre
- Capacity: 300
- Surface: grass
- Scoreboard: no

Construction
- Built: 1983
- Renovated: 2018

Tenant
- FC Chibati Lanchkhuti

== History ==
The stadium is located in the village of Chibati, Lanchkhuti Municipality, and has served as the home ground for FC Chibati since the club's establishment in 1983.During the Soviet era, the venue and the local football team were developed with the support of Tamaz Chakhvadze, who chaired Chibati's collective farm for 25 years and was one of the club's founders.

Following the restoration of FC Chibati in 2018 under the administration of the Lanchkhuti Municipality Sports Centre, the stadium hosted the club's home fixtures in the Regionuli Liga from 2019 through the 2025 season. Beyond league football, the venue serves as the central gathering ground.
