= Vakho Bedoshvili =

Georgian footballer (born 2003)

Personal information
- Date of birth: 19 October 2003 (age 23)
- Place of birth: Rustavi, Georgia
- Height: 1.70 m (5 ft 7 in)
- Position: Midfielder

Team information
- Current team: Iberia 1999 (on loan from Pari Nizhny Novgorod)
- Number: 24

Youth career
- –2021: Dinamo Tbilisi

Senior career*
Years	Team	Apps	(Gls)
2022	Gorda Rustavi		
2022	Tbilisi		
2023–2025	Orbi Tbilisi		
2025	→ Gareji (loan)	18	(3)
2025–	Pari Nizhny Novgorod	1	(0)
2026–	→ Iberia 1999 (loan)	19	(4)

International career
2025	Georgia U21	2	(0)
- * Club domestic league appearances and goals as of 14:08, 15 August 2026 (UTC)

Vakho Bedoshvili (Georgian: ვახო ბედოშვილი; born 19 October 2003) is a Georgian professional footballer who plays as a right winger for Iberia 1999, on loan from Russian Premier League club Pari Nizhny Novgorod.

== Club career ==
Bedoshvili started his career at his hometown club Gorda, opening his goal-scoring account in a 11–0 national cup win over Chibati on 9 May 2022. The next year he moved to Liga 3 side Irao and scored his first goal on 27 April 2023 as his team sustained a narrow home defeat to Shturmi. With Irao changing its name to Orbi in 2024, Bedoshvili established himself as a key player and drew interest from Gareji who won promotion to the Erovnuli Liga. His year-long loan deal was signed in January 2025.

Bedoshvili had an electric start to the top-flight season. He took part in all 18 matches of the first half of the league season, scoring three times. His sublime long-distance strike in a 4–1 win against Kolkheti 1913 on 5 May made him Player of the Match, followed by his four-time selection in Team of the Week. Moreover, Bedoshvili was named by Lelo as Player of the League along with Giorgi Abuashvili in late May and included by the Erovnuli Liga among the best eleven players.

As the in-form winger continued to receive accolades, he was the only new player to be called up to the national U21 team as it started final preparations for the 2025 UEFA European Under-21 Championship. He played two official games, including against Portugal on 17 June 2025.

On 16 February 2026, Bedoshvili moved on loan to Iberia 1999.

On 11 August 2026, Bedoshvili opened his goalscoring account in European competitions as Iberia 1999 edged past Northern Irish champions Larne in the 3rd round of the UEFA Europa League.

== Career statistics ==
As of 11 August 2026

Appearances and goals by club, season and competition
Club	Season	League			National cup (Note: Includes Georgian Cup, Russian Cup)		Continental		Other		Total	
Club	Season	Division	Apps	Goals	Apps	Goals	Apps	Goals	Apps	Goals	Apps	Goals
Irao / Orbi	2023	Liga 3	28	7	3	2	—		—		31	9
Irao / Orbi	2024	Liga 3	19	3	1	0	—		—		20	3
Irao / Orbi	Total		47	10	4	2	0	0	0	0	51	12
Gareji (loan)	2025	Erovnuli Liga	18	3	—		—		—		18	3
Pari Nizhny Novgorod	2025–26	Russian Premier League	1	0	1	0	—		—		2	0
Iberia 1999 (loan)	2026	Erovnuli Liga	19	4	0	0	4 (Note: Three appearances in UEFA Champions League and one appearance in UEFA Europa League)	1	2 (Note: Appearances in Georgian Super Cup)	2	25	7
Career total			85	17	5	2	4	1	2	2	96	22
