= Avtandil Nariashvili =

Personal information
- Date of birth: 1 January 1961 (age 65)
- Place of birth: Georgian SSR, Soviet Union
- Position: Defender

Team information
- Current team: Chibati (manager)

Senior career*
| Years | Team | Apps | (Gls) |
| 1983–1996 | Guria Lanchkhuti | | |

Managerial career
- 2011–2013: Guria Lanchkhuti
- 2014–2015: Guria Lanchkhuti (assistant)
- 2019: Chibati
- 2020: Chibati (assistant)
- 2020–2021: Guria Lanchkhuti
- 2022-present: Chibati
- * Club domestic league appearances and goals

Avtandil Nariashvili (Georgian: ავთანდილ ნარიაშვილი, born 1 January 1961) is a Georgian football manager and former defender who currently serves as the head coach of FC Chibati Lanchkhuti.

== Career ==
Throughout his playing career in the 1980s and 1990s, he played as a defender for his hometown club FC Guria Lanchkhuti, competing in the Soviet First League starting in 1983 and continuing into the Georgian national championship until his retirement from professional football on 1 August 1996.

Following his playing days, Nariashvili transitioned into coaching, beginning in the late 2000s with youth and senior roles at Spartaki Tbilisi, FC Zestafoni, and as head coach for Guria Lanchkhuti until his replacement in 2002 by Ramaz Pirtskhalaishvili. He later again became head coach of Guria Lanchkhuti in the Pirveli Liga during the 2008–2009 season.

From 2011 to 2015, he focused on youth development in Lanchkhuti, coaching Lanchkhuti's youth squads and serving as an assistant coach for Guria Lanchkhuti's U19 team. In 2019, he took over as head coach of the revived regional club FC Chibati Lanchkhuti, spent 2020 working as an assistant coach at Chibati alongside a role with Lanchkhuti, and in 2022 was reappointed head coach of FC Chibati Lanchkhuti in the Georgian Regionuli Liga, succeeding Temur Loria and continuing a family football tradition alongside his son, footballer Nikoloz Nariashvili.
