= Saba Kharebashvili =

Georgian footballer (born 2008)

Personal information
- Date of birth: 3 September 2008 (age 18)
- Place of birth: Tbilisi, Georgia
- Height: 1.84 m (6 ft 0 in)
- Position: Defender

Team information
- Current team: İstanbul Başakşehir
- Number: 38

Youth career
- –2023: Dinamo Tbilisi

Senior career*
Years	Team	Apps	(Gls)
2024	Dinamo-2 Tbilisi	6	(0)
2024–2026	Dinamo Tbilisi	67	(0)
2026–	İstanbul Başakşehir	2	(0)

International career^{‡}
2022	Georgia U15	3	(0)
2022–2023	Georgia U16	4	(0)
2023–	Georgia U17	14	(0)
2023–	Georgia U19	8	(0)
2025–	Georgia	3	(0)
- * Club domestic league appearances and goals as of 10 December 2025 ‡ National team caps and goals as of 26 September 2026

Saba Kharebashvili (Georgian: საბა ხარებაშვილი; born 3 September 2008) is a Georgian footballer who plays as a defender for İstanbul Başakşehir and the Georgia national team.

== Early life ==
Kharebashvili was born on 3 September 2008 in Tbilisi, Georgia. Growing up, he regarded Portugal international Cristiano Ronaldo as his football idol and supported Spanish La Liga side Real Madrid.

== Club career ==
As a youth player, Kharebashvili joined the youth academy of Dinamo Tbilisi and started his senior career with the club's reserve team in 2024 before being promoted to the first team the same year. On 26 April 2024, he debuted for them during a 0–0 home draw with Telavi in the league. During his first season with them, he helped them reach the final of the 2024 Georgian Cup, where they lost on penalty shots to Spaeri after a 2–2 draw.

On 11 July 2024, Kharebashvili set a new record in the history of UEFA club competitions as the youngest player making appearance at 15 years, ten months and 8 days.

At the end of the 2024 season, Kharebashvili was recognized by the Georgian Football Federation as U17 Player of the Year and awarded the Aleksandre Chivadze golden medal.

On February 9th 2026, İstanbul Başakşehir announced that they had agreed a deal with Dinamo Tbilisi to sign Kharebashvili on a future deal for the 2026 season once he becomes 18.

== International ==
After featuring in each of Georgia's national youth team up to the U19 level, Kharebashvili was called up to the national team for a friendly match against Faroe Islands in June 2025. He came off the bench in the second half, becoming the all-time youngest player of the team at 16 years, nine months and two days.

== Style of play ==
Kharebashvili plays as a defender. Left-footed, he is known for his versatility, technical ability, and passing ability.

== Career statistics ==
As of 29 May 2025

Appearances and goals by club, season and competition
Club	Season	League			National cup		European		Other		Total	
Club	Season	Division	Apps	Goals	Apps	Goals	Apps	Goals	Apps	Goals	Apps	Goals
Dinamo Tbilisi-2	2024	Erovnuli Liga 2	7	0	—		—		—		7	0
Dinamo Tbilisi	2024	Erovnuli Liga	21	0	4	0	1 (Note: appearance in UEFA Conference League)	0	2 (Note: Appearances in Georgian Super Cup)	0	28	0
Dinamo Tbilisi	2025	Erovnuli Liga	29	0	1	0	—		—		30	0
Dinamo Tbilisi	2025	Erovnuli Liga	17	0	0	0	0	0	0	0	17	0
Dinamo Tbilisi	Total		67	0	5	0	1	0	2	0	75	0
İstanbul Başakşehir	2026–27	Süper Lig	2	0	0	0	0	0	—		2	0
Career total			76	0	5	0	1	0	2	0	84	0

== Honours ==
Individual

- U17 Player of the Year: 2024
