= Giorgi Loria =

Georgian footballer (born 1986)

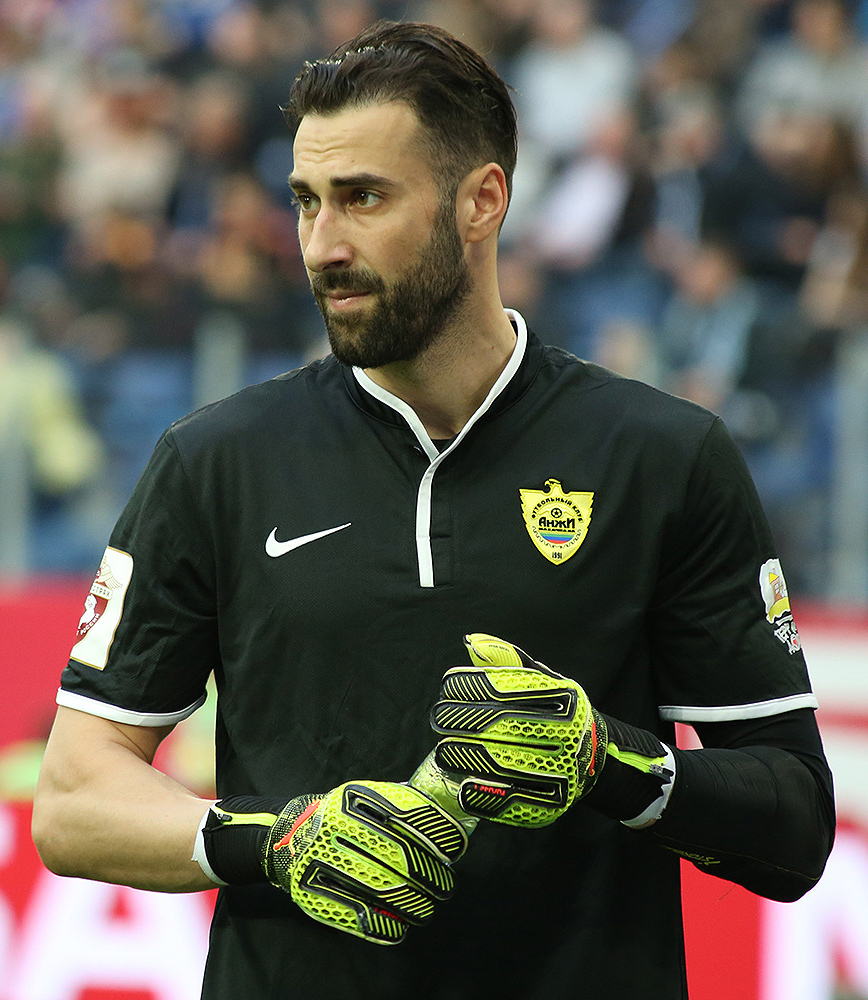
- Loria with FC Anzhi Makhachkala in 2018

Personal information
- Date of birth: 27 January 1986 (age 40)
- Place of birth: Tbilisi, Georgian SSR, Soviet Union
- Height: 1.97 m (6 ft 6 in)
- Position: Goalkeeper

Team information
- Current team: Dinamo Tbilisi
- Number: 1

Youth career
- 1994–2002: Avaza Tbilisi
- 2002–2005: Dinamo Tbilisi

Senior career*
Years	Team	Apps	(Gls)
2005–2014	Dinamo Tbilisi	171	(0)
2014–2015	OFI	25	(0)
2015	Olympiacos	0	(0)
2015–2018	Krylia Sovetov Samara	39	(0)
2017–2018	→ Anzhi Makhachkala (loan)	13	(0)
2019	1. FC Magdeburg	11	(0)
2019–2023	Anorthosis Famagusta	111	(0)
2023–2024	Dinamo Tbilisi	26	(0)
2024–2025	Omonia Aradippou	32	(0)
2025–	Dinamo Tbilisi	33	(0)

International career^{‡}
2006–2008	Georgia U-21	4	(0)
2008–2025	Georgia	79	(0)
- * Club domestic league appearances and goals as of 21 August 2026 ‡ National team caps and goals as of 5 June 2025

Giorgi Loria (Order of Honor) (Georgian: გიორგი ლორია, pronounced [ɡioɾɡi loɾia]; born 27 January 1986) is a Georgian professional footballer who plays as a goalkeeper for Dinamo Tbilisi.

During his long career Loria has played in five different leagues and become the most capped goalkeeper of the national team. He is the three-time Georgian champion with Dinamo Tbilisi. Loria has also won the national cup and Supercup six times in total. While at Anorthosis, he lifted the Cypriot Cup as well.

== Club career ==
Loria joined the Avaza football school at age 8. At 17, he moved to Dinamo Tbilisi academy whence he was initially promoted to its junior team. In 2005 Loria played for the senior team for the first time. After nine consecutive seasons at Dinamo, he left the club in July 2014 having won eight titles across all three domestic competitions.

During the 2014–15 season, Loria played for OFI but due to the club's financial problems he left the club at the end of the season. According to a source, Loria had reached a verbal agreement with PAOK in early 2015, however he did not sign for the team.

The keeper was eventually signed by Olympiacos as a back-up of Roberto, since the second-choice goalkeeper Balázs Megyeri had left the Greek giants. Loria signed with Olympiacos for a two-year contract. OFI were rumored to have accepted a bid in the region of €700,000, as Loria was among the top goalkeepers in the 2014–15 season.

Loria quickly left Olympiacos due to personal issues and increased competition with teammates Stefanos Kapino and Andreas Gianniotis for the team's #2, while Roberto is undoubtedly the team's first-choice under their goalposts and one of Thrylos' captains. Olympiacos' latest intention to invest in the two young Greek prospects' development was a contributing factor for Loria's decision to leave the squad. Both the player and the club agreed that it was best to part ways. He signed for the Russian Premier League side Krylia Sovetov Samara shortly after.

On 21 August 2017, following Krylia Sovetov's relegation from the Russian Premier League, he joined Anzhi Makhachkala on loan for 2017–18 season.

On 18 January 2019, Loria signed a six-month deal with 2. Bundesliga side 1. FC Magdeburg.

On 4 July 2019, he signed with Cypriot club Anorthosis Famagusta. On 17 March 2022, the sides renewed the contract until the summer of 2024.

On 27 June 2023, the management of Anorthosis announced that he is a past member of the team. In the four years (2019–2023) that he wore the "blue and white" he was the team's main goalkeeper and a protagonist in the team's successes, winning the 2021 Cup and qualifying for the UEFA Europa Conference League group stage. And with 127 appearances in official matches, he managed to climb to seventh place on the list of foreigners with the most appearances.

After a nine-year pause Loria rejoined his youth club and Erovnuli Liga's defending champions Dinamo Tbilisi in late June 2023. A few days after his return, Dinamo won a four-team Super Cup tournament with Loria playing a crucial role in this success as he saved three after-match penalties in two games. Following this season, Loria was recognized as Goalkeeper of the Year at an annual awards ceremony.

On 15 May 2024, he reached the milestone of 100 clean sheets for Dinamo.

On 3 July 2024, newly promoted Cypriot First Division side Omonia Aradippou announced signing Loria on a year-long deal.

On 29 June 2025, Dinamo Tbilisi announced the return of Loria on a contract until the end of the season.

== International career ==
Loria made his debut for Georgia in a friendly match against Estonia on 27 May 2008. In his seventh appearance for Georgia, Loria saved a penalty kick from Slovenia's Milivoje Novaković, helping the team to a 2–1 win in Koper.

For much of his national team career, Loria battled with Nukri Revishvili for the number one jersey, as well as the veteran Giorgi Lomaia, who played in the majority of the team's UEFA Euro 2008 and 2010 FIFA World Cup qualifiers. Loria played the first six matches of the UEFA Euro 2016 qualifying campaign, before being replaced by Revishvili for the final four matches. He then started the first five 2018 FIFA World Cup qualification matches but was displaced by Giorgi Makaridze for four of the last five fixtures.

Loria played in all six of Georgia's 2018–19 UEFA Nations League fixtures, keeping four clean sheets and conceding only twice as the Crusaders finished top of Group 1 in League D with five wins from six matches to gain promotion to League C. He then played the entire UEFA Euro 2020 qualifying campaign, keeping clean sheets against Gibraltar, Denmark and the Republic of Ireland.

On 8 October 2020, Loria kept a clean sheet in the 1–0 defeat of Belarus in the UEFA Euro 2020 qualifying play-off semi-final at the Boris Paichadze National Stadium in Tbilisi. He went on to play in the play-off final against North Macedonia on 12 November, which Georgia lost 1–0 to narrowly miss out on their first qualification to a major international tournament.

Loria continued to keep goal for Georgia during the 2022 FIFA World Cup qualification campaign and kept a clean sheet in the final match as the Georgians beat Sweden in Batumi.

The emergence of Giorgi Mamardashvili saw Loria rotate with the U21 goalkeeper during the 2022–23 UEFA Nations League, where Georgia gained promotion to League B, topping their group with 16 points from six matches. Mamardashvili became first choice goalkeeper in the successful UEFA Euro 2024 qualifying campaign.

In May 2024, Loria was named in Georgia's squad for the UEFA Euro 2024 finals in Germany, where he served as back-up for Giorgi Mamardashvili.

On June 4, 2025, Loria announced his retirement from the national team after seventeen years as a Georgian international. He played his last match for the Georgia national football team one day later on June 5th, in a friendly against Faroe Islands.

== Personal life ==
His father Nugzar Loria was a film producer. Giorgi himself studied at the Theatre and Film University and once featured in movie What happened in Kyiv as an actor.

Married to Salome Kopaliani, he has one daughter.

== Career statistics ==
=== Club ===
As of match played 30 July 2026

Appearances and goals by club, season and competition
Club	Season	League			Cup		Continental		Other		Total	
Club	Season	Division	Apps	Goals	Apps	Goals	Apps	Goals	Apps	Goals	Apps	Goals
Dinamo Tbilisi	2005–06	Erovnuli Liga	1	0	0	0	0	0	—		1	0
Dinamo Tbilisi	2006–07	Erovnuli Liga	10	0	0	0	2	0	—		12	0
Dinamo Tbilisi	2007–08	Erovnuli Liga	4	0	0	0	2	0	—		6	0
Dinamo Tbilisi	2008–09	Erovnuli Liga	3	0	0	0	0	0	—		3	0
Dinamo Tbilisi	2009–10	Erovnuli Liga	34	0	5	0	4	0	—		43	0
Dinamo Tbilisi	2010–11	Erovnuli Liga	35	0	3	0	6	0	—		44	0
Dinamo Tbilisi	2011–12	Erovnuli Liga	30	0	1	0	8	0	—		39	0
Dinamo Tbilisi	2012–13	Erovnuli Liga	24	0	8	0	—		—		32	0
Dinamo Tbilisi	2013–14	Erovnuli Liga	30	0	5	0	6	0	1 (Note: Appearances in Georgian Super Cup)	0	42	0
Dinamo Tbilisi	2014–15	Erovnuli Liga	—		—		2	0	—		2	0
Dinamo Tbilisi	Total		171	0	22	0	30	0	1	0	224	0
OFI	2014–15	Super League Greece	25	0	5	0	—		—		30	0
Olympiacos	2015–16	Super League Greece	—		—		—		—		—	
Krylia Sovetov Samara	2015–16	Russian Premier League	14	0	1	0	—		—		15	0
Krylia Sovetov Samara	2016–17	Russian Premier League	25	0	0	0	—		—		25	0
Krylia Sovetov Samara	Total		39	0	1	0	0	0	0	0	40	0
Anzhi Makhachkala (loan)	2017–18	Russian Premier League	13	0	—		—		—		13	0
1. FC Magdeburg	2018–19	2. Bundesliga	11	0	—		—		—		11	0
Anorthosis	2019–20	Cypriot First Division	21	0	2	0	—		—		23	0
Anorthosis	2020–21	Cypriot First Division	34	0	4	0	1	0	—		39	0
Anorthosis	2021–22	Cypriot First Division	31	0	1	0	5	0	1	0	38	0
Anorthosis	2022–23	Cypriot First Division	25	0	2	0	—		—		27	0
Anorthosis	Total		111	0	9	0	6	0	1	0	127	0
Dinamo Tbilisi	2023	Erovnuli Liga	13	0	2	0	4	0	2	0	21	0
Dinamo Tbilisi	2024	Erovnuli Liga	13	0	0	0	0	0	0	0	13	0
Dinamo Tbilisi	Total		26	0	2	0	4	0	2	0	34	0
Omonia Aradippou	2024–25	Cypriot First Division	32	0	0	0	—		—		32	0
Dinamo Tbilisi	2025	Erovnuli Liga	18	0	1	0	—		—		19	0
Dinamo Tbilisi	2026	Erovnuli Liga	15	0	0	0	4	0	1	0	20	0
Dinamo Tbilisi	Total		33	0	1	0	4	0	1	0	39	0
Career total			461	0	40	0	44	0	5	0	550	0

== Honours ==
Anorthosis

- Cypriot Cup: 2020–21
- Cypriot Super Cup: Runner-Up 2021

Dinamo Tbilisi

- Georgian League: 2007–08, 2012–13, 2013–14
- Georgian Cup: 2008–09, 2012–13, 2013–14
- Georgian Super Cup: 2006, 2008, 2023
