= Andria Kvirikadze =

Georgian footballer (born 2008)

Personal information
- Date of birth: 14 May 2008 (age 18)
- Place of birth: Batumi, Georgia
- Height: 1.86 m (6 ft 1 in)
- Position: Attacking midfielder

Team information
- Current team: Paris FC II

Youth career
- Dinamo Tbilisi
- 2026–: Paris FC

Senior career*
Years	Team	Apps	(Gls)
2026–	Paris FC II	2	(0)

International career^{‡}
- Georgia U17
- * Club domestic league appearances and goals as of 5 September 2026 ‡ National team caps and goals as of 2 July 2026

Andria Kvirikadze (Georgian: ანდრია კვირიკაძე, romanized: andria k'virik'adze; born 14 May 2008) is a Georgian professional footballer who plays as a midfielder for Paris FC II.

== Club career ==
Born in Batumi, Kvirikadze is a youth product of FC Dinamo Tbilisi, where he first played for the reserve and youth team, in the UEFA Youth League, before starting to appear on the team sheet during the end of the 2025 Erovnuli Liga.

In the summer 2026, he signed a three years contrat with Paris FC in Ligue 1, where he will initially play with the reserve team in National 2.

== International career ==
Kvirikadze is a youth international for Georgia, having played for the under-17.

== Style of play ==
Raised as an offensive midfielder, Kvirikadze is also able to play as a wing forward.
