= FC Chibati Lanchkhuti =

- Founded: 1983, (refounded) 2018
- Ground: Tamaz Chakhvadze Stadium,chibati Lanchkhuti, Georgia
- Capacity: 500
- Owner: Lanchkhuti Municipality's local Sport Centre
- Head Coach: Avtandil Nariashvili
- League: Currently suspended
- 2025: 10th of 16, Regionuli Liga C
Home colours	Away colours

FC Chibati (Georgian: საფეხბურთო კლუბი ჩიბათი) is a Georgian association football club based in Lanchkhuti, which most recently competed in Regionuli Liga, the fifth tier of the national league system.

== History ==
Chibati were founded in 1983. They served as a reserve team for Guria and participated in the second division of Georgian championship for several years.

In 2018, the team was restored on the basis of a local Sport Centre. The next year they took part in Regionuli Liga, where the debutants under Revaz Kukuladze qualified for the Promotion Group. In the second stage of the competition the team finished 9th.

In the 2020 season, shortened by COVID, Chibati finished in mid-table. In early 2021, the team was faced with an extraordinaan: საფეხბურთო კლუბი ჩიბათი) is a defunct Georgianry case during the opening game. Following the injuries sustained by both goalkeepers, an outfield player had to go in goal.

In August 2021, the former Guria and Bakhmaro manager Temur Loria was appointed as head coach of the team, who was replaced in early next year by Avtandil Nariashvili, also known for his tenure at Guria.

== Seasons ==
Year	League	M	W	D	L	GF–GA	Pts	Pos	Cup
2019	Regionuli Liga, West B	9	7	1	1	34-14	22	2_{/10}	–
2019	Promotion Group	18	5	4	9	37-49	19	9_{/10}	–
2020	Regionuli Liga, West B	14	6	3	5	31-30	20	5_{/9}	–
2021	Regionuli Liga, West B	24	11	4	9	51-33	37	6_{/9}	Round 1
2022	Regionuli Liga, C Group	20	1	4	15	22-78	7	11_{/11}	Round 1
2023	Regionui Liga, C Group	24	9	4	11	60-44	31	7_{/13}	–
2024	Regionuli Liga, C Group	24	7	3	14	44–70	24	9_{/13}	–
2025	Regionuli Liga, C Group	30	10	4	16	55–87	34	10_{/16}	–

== Squad ==
As of May 2022

Note: Flags indicate national team as defined under FIFA eligibility rules; some limited exceptions apply. Players may hold more than one non-FIFA nationality.

No.	Pos.	Nation	Player
2	GK	GEO	Luka Pirtskhalasivili
3	DF	GEO	Giorgi Gvarjaladze
4	DF	GEO	Giviko Tsintadze
5	DF	GEO	Ramin Kuridze
7	MF	GEO	Gega Gobronidze
8	MF	GEO	Giorgi Khukhunaishvili
9	FW	GEO	Nika Nakaidze
10	MF	GEO	Beka Kvachadze

No.	Pos.	Nation	Player
11	FW	GEO	Soso Goguadze
12	FW	GEO	Giorgi Chachava
13	DF	GEO	Mishiko Komakhidze
14	MF	GEO	Luka Urushadze
16	MF	GEO	Tornike Gogeshvili
29	GK	GEO	Luka Sarjveladze
33	GK	GEO	Luka Apkhazava

== Stadium ==
The team played its home games at a local stadium named after Тamaz Chakhvadze, one of the founders of the club.
