= 2026 Erovnuli Liga =

Erovnuli Liga
- Season: 2026
- Dates: 28 February – 5 December 2026
- Matches: 166
- Goals: 433 (2.61 per match)
- All statistics correct as of 21 November 2026.

The 2026 Erovnuli Liga or Crystalbet Erovnuli Liga 2026 is the 38th season of top-tier football in Georgia. The season is scheduled to run from February to December 2026. Iberia 1999 (formerly Saburtalo Tbilisi) enter the season as defending champions after securing the 2025 title.

== Teams and stadiums ==
=== Changes ===
Rustavi was directly promoted from the 2025 Erovnuli Liga 2 thus returning after a 6-year absence. Spaeri and Meshakhte were both promoted through the play-offs, both promoted for the first time in history. They respectively defeated Gareji and Telavi in two-legged play-offs, Gareji ended their single year stint on top tier whilst Telavi ended their 5-years stint on top tier. Kolkheti was directly relegated to 2026 Erovnuli Liga 2 thus ending their 2-year stint on top tier.

Locations of the 2026 Erovnuli Liga teams.

Team	Location	Venue	Capacity
Dila Gori	Gori	Tengiz Burjanadze Stadium	5,000
Dinamo Batumi	Batumi	Adjarabet Arena	20,000
Dinamo Tbilisi	Tbilisi	Boris Paichadze Stadium; David Petriashvili Arena	54,549; 2,000
Gagra	Tbilisi	David Petriashvili Arena	2,000
Iberia 1999	Tbilisi	Mikheil Meskhi Stadium	22,754
Meshakhte	Tkibuli	26 May Stadium, Tsqaltubo	3,500
Rustavi	Rustavi	David Petriashvili Arena, Tbilisi	2,000
Samgurali Tsqaltubo	Tsqaltubo	26 May Stadium, Tsqaltubo	3,500
Spaeri	Tbilisi	Mikheil Meskhi Stadium - 2	1,000
Torpedo Kutaisi	Kutaisi	Ramaz Shengelia Stadium	19,400

=== Personnel and kits ===
Team	Head coach	Captain	Kit manufacturer	Shirt sponsor
Dila	(Greece) Akis Vavalis	(Georgia (country)) Nika Gagnidze	Nike	Marsbet
Dinamo Batumi	(Georgia (country)) Giorgi Chiabrishvili	(Georgia (country)) Mamuka Kobakhidze	Macron	Crocobet; Lixin Group
Dinamo Tbilisi	(Georgia (country)) Temur Ketsbaia	(Georgia (country)) Aleksandre Kalandadze	Puma	adjarabet.com Marsbet
Gagra	(Serbia) Zeljko Ljubenovic	(Georgia (country)) Mate Vatsadze	Puma	N/A
Iberia 1999	(Ukraine) Andriy Demchenko	(Georgia (country)) Gizo Mamageishvili	Givova	Audi
Meshakhte	(Georgia (country)) Kakhaber Chkhetiani	(Georgia (country)) Levan Tkeshelashvili	Nine	Ronix
Rustavi	(Georgia (country)) Giorgi Tsetsadze	(Georgia (country)) Levan Shovnadze	Jako	Rustaveli
Samgurali	(Georgia (country)) Giorgi Oniani	(Georgia (country)) Demur Chikhladze	Hummel	Halyk Bank; Crocobet
Spaeri	(Georgia (country)) Anzor Koghuradze	(Georgia (country)) Nikolooz Kenchadze	Saller	N/A
Torpedo Kutaisi	(Germany) Dirk Schuster	(Georgia (country)) Vladimer Mamuchashvili	Macron	New Vision University

=== Managerial changes ===
Team	Outgoing manager	Manner of departure	Position in table	Date of vacancy	Replaced by	Position in table	Date of appointment	Ref.
Samgurali	(Brazil) Thiago Gomes	Mutual consent	18 January 2026	Pre-season	(Georgia (country)) Giorgi Oniani	Pre-season	18 January 2026	
Dinamo Tbilisi	(Georgia (country)) Vladimer Kakashvili	Mutual consent	22 April 2026	8th	(Georgia (country)) Temur Ketsbaia	8th	22 April 2026	
Dila	(Italy) Diego Longo	Mutual consent	9 May 2026	4th	(Georgia (country)) Levan Korgalidze	3rd	13 May 2026	
Dila	(Georgia (country)) Levan Korgalidze	For personal reasons	4 June 2026	8th	(Greece) Akis Vavalis	7th	20 June 2026	
Iberia 1999	(Georgia (country)) Guga Nergadze	Mutual consent	16 June 2026	1st	(Ukraine) Andriy Demchenko	1st	16 June 2026	
Meshakhte Tkibuli	(Georgia (country)) Vladimir Burduli	Sacked	18 July 2026	10th	(Georgia (country)) Kakhaber Chkhetiani	10th	18 July 2026	

== League table ==
Pos	Team	Pld	W	D	L	GF	GA	GD	Pts	Qualification or relegation
1	Iberia 1999	34	19	6	9	49	35	+14	63	Qualification for the Champions League first qualifying round
2	Dinamo Batumi	33	18	8	7	58	41	+17	62	Qualification for the Conference League first qualifying round
3	Dinamo Tbilisi	33	16	11	6	53	33	+20	59	
4	Rustavi	33	16	8	9	41	30	+11	56	
5	Torpedo Kutaisi	33	11	11	11	54	45	+9	44	
6	Dila Gori	33	13	4	16	44	43	+1	43	
7	Samgurali Tsqaltubo	33	11	6	16	43	58	−15	39	
8	Spaeri (Y)	34	6	14	14	45	56	−11	32	Qualification to Relegation play-offs
9	Gagra	33	6	13	14	30	49	−19	31	Qualification to Relegation play-offs
10	Meshakhte (Y)	33	4	11	18	28	55	−27	23	Relegation to Erovnuli Liga 2

Updated to match(es) played on 21 November 2026. Source: Erovnuli Liga, Soccerway
Rules for classification: 1) Points; 2) Goal difference; 3) Goals scored 4) Head-to-head points; 5) Head-to-head goal difference; 6) Head-to-head goals scored; 7) Head-to-head away goals scored (only if two teams).
(Y) Assured a place of the Relegation play-offs, but may still be relegated directly

== Results ==
Each team will play the other nine teams home and away twice, for a total of 36 games each.

=== Round 1–18 ===
Home \ Away	DIL	DBT	DTB	GAG	IBE	MES	RUS	SMG	SPA	TKU
Dila Gori	—	1–0	0–0	1–1	0–1	0–1	1–2 (Note: Postponed due to weather conditions)	2–3	3–1	1–0
Dinamo Batumi	3–2	—	2–2	1–1	0–3	2–1	1–0	3–1	4–1 (Note: Postponed)	0–3
Dinamo Tbilisi	1–2 (Note: Postponed)	2–2 (Note: Postponed due to weather conditions)	—	0–1	2–0	1–1	0–0	5–3	2–1	0–1
Gagra	2–0	1–2	2–1	—	1–2 (Note: Postponed)	1–1	1–1	0–1	0–3	2–2
Iberia 1999	1–0	1–0	0–0	1–0	—	2–2 (Note: Postponed due to weather conditions)	1–2	2–1	1–1	1–1
Meshakhte	0–2	0–0	1–6	1–1	1–4	—	0–0	0–0	0–0	1–4
Rustavi	1–0	3–0	2–3	1–2	2–1	1–0	—	1–0	2–1	1–0
Samgurali	0–1	1–1	1–2	2–0	3–2	3–1	2–1 (Note: Postponed)	—	0–0	2–1
Spaeri	0–1	3–3	1–2	3–0	0–2	2–1	1–1	4–1	—	1–1
Torpedo Kutaisi	2–1	2–3	0–0	1–2	1–0	3–0 (Note: Postponed)	1–1	6–1	1–2	—

Source: Erovnuli Liga Results, Soccerway
Legend: Blue = home team win; Yellow = draw; Red = away team win.

=== Round 19–36 ===
Home \ Away	DIL	DBT	DTB	GAG	IBE	MES	RUS	SMG	SPA	TKU
Dila Gori	—	2–2	0–2	1–0	0–2	3–1	3–0	1 Dec	5 Dec	2–2
Dinamo Batumi	27 Nov	—	1–0	2–2	2–0	1–0	2–1	3–0	3–0	3–2
Dinamo Tbilisi	2–1	2–1	—	4–0	0–0	0–0	0–3	5 Dec	3–1	1–1
Gagra	2–3	1–3	24 Nov	—	2–0	1–1	2–2	0–0	1–1	1–1
Iberia 1999	2–1 (Note: Postponed)	1 Dec	1–2 (Note: Postponed)	1–0	—	2–1	5 Dec	2–1	1–0	3–2
Meshakhte	2–1	0–1	29 Nov	5 Dec	1–2	—	0–1	1–2	2–2	2–3
Rustavi	3–1	0–1	0–2	3–0	0–2	25 Nov	—	2–0	30 Nov	1–0
Samgurali	1–3	0–4	2–3	3–0	0–1	2–0	1–1	—	0–0	25 Nov
Spaeri	1–4	3–2	1–2	0–0	2–2	2–3	1–1	3–4	—	3–3
Torpedo Kutaisi	2–1	5 Dec	1–1	30 Nov	4–3	0–2	0–1	3–2	0–0	—

Updated to match(es) played on 21 November 2026. Source: Erovnuli Liga Results, Erovnuli Liga Fixtures, Soccerway
Legend: Blue = home team win; Yellow = draw; Red = away team win.

== Relegation play-offs ==
December 2026

v

December 2026

v

December 2026

v

December 2026

v

== Statistics ==
=== Top scorers ===
As of match played 21 November 2026

|-

Rank	Player	Club	Goals
1	(Serbia) Komnen Andrić	Torpedo Kutaisi	13
2	(Georgia (country)) Amiran Dzagania	Iberia 1999	11
3	(Brazil) Zhan Souza De Almeida	Rustavi	10
4	(Georgia (country)) Shota Shekiladze	Dila Gori	9
4	(Moldova) Dmitri Mandricenco	Dinamo Batumi	9
4	(Georgia (country)) Lasha Menteshashvili	Dila Gori	9
4	(Brazil) Klaudio Sebolinia	Samgurali Tskaltubo	9
4	(Georgia (country)) Mate Vatsadze	Dinamo Tbilisi	9
4	(Brazil) Wellissol	Samgurali	9
10	(Georgia (country)) Giorgi Arabidze	Torpedo Kutaisi	8
10	(Georgia (country)) Giorgi Jinjolava	Iberia 1999	8
10	(Brazil) Felipe Pires	Torpedo Kutaisi	8
10	(Georgia (country)) Nika Kalandarishvili	Dinamo Batumi	8
10	(Albania) Uerdi Mara	Dinamo Batumi	8

=== Hat-tricks ===
Player	For	Against	Result	Date	Ref.
(Georgia (country)) Vakho Bedoshvili	Iberia 1999	Meshakhte Tkibuli	4-1	2 May 2026	
(Serbia) Komnen Andrić	Torpedo Kutaisi	Meshakhte Tkibuli	4-1	20 May 2026	

=== Clean sheets ===
As of match played 21 November 2026

Rank	Player	Club	Clean sheets
1	(Georgia (country)) Papuna Beruashvili	Rustavi	12
2	(Georgia (country)) Davit Kereselidze	Dila Gori	8
3	(Georgia (country)) Levan Shovnadze	Meshakhte	7
3	(Georgia (country)) Bukhuti Putkaradze	Spaeri	7
3	(Georgia (country)) Nodari Kalichava	Dinamo Batumi	7
6	(Georgia (country)) Tornike Megrelishvili	Iberia 1999	6
6	(Georgia (country)) Giorgi Makaridze	Iberia 1999	6
8	(Serbia) Filip Kljajić	Torpedo Kutaisi	5
8	(Georgia (country)) Giorgi Loria	Dinamo Tbilisi	5
8	(Ukraine) Oleksandr Vorobey	Gagra	5
