= Janne-Pekka Laine =

Finnish footballer (born 2001)

Personal information
- Full name: Janne-Pekka Samuli Laine
- Date of birth: 25 January 2001 (age 25)
- Place of birth: Tampere, Finland
- Height: 1.84 m (6 ft 0 in)
- Position: Central midfielder

Team information
- Current team: Inter Turku
- Number: 14

Youth career
- 2006–2017: Ilves

Senior career*
Years	Team	Apps	(Gls)
2018–2020	Ilves	10	(0)
2019–2020	Ilves II	29	(1)
2021–2023	Haka	67	(5)
2023–2025	Çaykur Rizespor	4	(0)
2024–2025	→ Esenler Erokspor (loan)	25	(0)
2026–	Inter Turku	29	(1)

International career^{‡}
2019	Finland U18	6	(0)
2019	Finland U19	2	(0)
Medal record
Ilves
First place	Finnish Cup	2019
- * Club domestic league appearances and goals as of 12 November 2026 ‡ National team caps and goals as of 13 October 2019

Janne-Pekka Samuli Laine (born 25 January 2001) is a Finnish professional footballer who plays as a central midfielder for Inter Turku.

== Club career ==
=== Ilves ===
Born in Tampere, Laine is a product of the Ilves youth academy. After making his debut in Veikkausliiga with the first team of Ilves in 2018 at the age of 17, Laine played in a total of 10 league games, before requesting for a transfer after the 2020 season. Due to injuries, he mostly featured in the Ilves II reserve team in Kakkonen in 2019 and 2020 seasons.

=== FC Haka ===
Laine moved to Valkeakoski and signed a two-year contract with Haka on 12 December 2020 for an undisclosed fee. Laine made his Veikkausliiga debut for Haka against HIFK on 3 May 2021.

On 9 September 2022, Laine extended his contract with Haka for the 2023 season.

=== Çaykur Rizespor ===
On 15 September 2023, Laine signed a three-year deal with Turkish club Çaykur Rizespor, for an undisclosed fee. He debuted in Süper Lig on 23 September 2023, in a 1–1 home draw against Sivasspor.

== International career ==
Laine has represented Finland at under-18 and under-19 youth national team levels.

== Personal life ==
His father Heikki-Jussi Laine has also played for Haka between 1984 and 1988, and his great-grandfather Juuso Walden was one of the founding members of the original Valkeakosken Haka in 1934.

== Career statistics ==
As of 25 July 2026

Appearances and goals by club, season and competition
Club	Season	League			National cup (Note: Includes Suomen Cup and Türkiye Kupası)		League cup		Europe		Total	
Club	Season	Division	Apps	Goals	Apps	Goals	Apps	Goals	Apps	Goals	Apps	Goals
Ilves	2018	Veikkausliiga	1	0	0	0	—		—		1	0
Ilves	2019	Veikkausliiga	1	0	3	1	—		—		4	1
Ilves	2020	Veikkausliiga	8	0	5	0	—		—		13	0
Ilves	Total		10	0	8	1	0	0	0	0	18	1
Ilves II	2019	Kakkonen	21	1	—		—		—		21	1
Ilves II	2020	Kakkonen	8	0	—		—		—		8	0
Ilves II	Total		29	1	–	–	–	–	–	–	29	1
Haka	2021	Veikkausliiga	23	1	3	0	—		—		26	1
Haka	2022	Veikkausliiga	25	2	4	1	5	1	—		34	4
Haka	2023	Veikkausliiga	19	2	1	0	5	0	1 (Note: Appearance UEFA Europa Conference League)	0	26	2
Haka	Total		67	5	8	1	10	1	1	0	86	7
Çaykur Rizespor	2023–24	Süper Lig	4	0	1	0	—		—		5	0
Esenler Erokspor (loan)	2024–25	TFF 1. Lig	25	0	1	0	—		—		26	0
Inter Turku	2026	Veikkausliiga	15	1	4	2	6	0	3	0	28	3
Career total			150	7	22	4	16	1	4	0	192	12

== Honours ==
Ilves

- Finnish Cup: 2019
