= Nino Kalandadze =

Georgian politician (born 1977)

- ნინო კალანდაძე

Deputy Minister of Foreign Affairs of Georgia
- In office 2008–2012

Member of Parliament of Georgia
- In office 2004–2008

Personal details
- Born: Nino Kalandadze; March 11, 1977 (age 49) Tbilisi, Georgia
- Spouse: Zaza Bibilashvili
- Children: 1
- Education: Tbilisi State University, The Fletcher School of Law and Diplomacy
- Occupation: Politician, lawyer, diplomat, civil society leader
- Known for: Co-founding the Chavchavadze Center for European Studies and Civic Education
- Awards: Presidential Order of Honors (Georgia), Presidential Order of Excellence (Georgia)

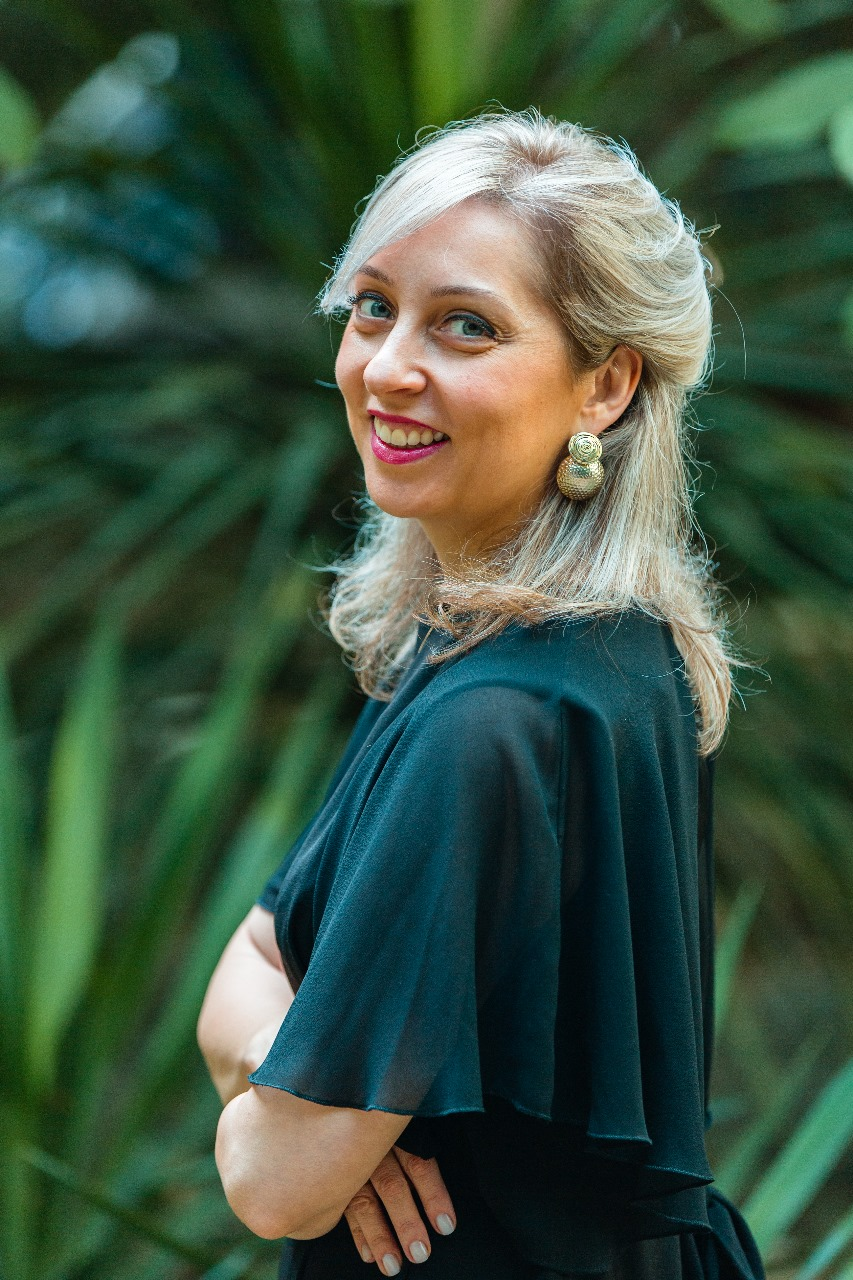
Nino Kalandadze

Nino Kalandadze (Georgian: ნინო კალანდაძე; born March 11, 1977) is a Georgian politician, lawyer, diplomat, and civil society leader. She co-founded and serves as the executive director of the Chavchavadze Center for European Studies and Civic Education, a think-tank and political foundation in Georgia.

== Early life and education ==
Kalandadze was born in 1977 in Georgia. In 1994, she finished Tbilisi public school N6. Later, she graduated from Gymnasium Schule Birklehof in Hinterzarten, Germany with an Abitur. In 1996 Kalandadze earned a diploma in law from Tbilisi State University in 2002. She also studied at the University of Mannheim Faculty of Law in Germany from 1997 to 1999. Kalandadze later received a Master's degree in International Relations from The Fletcher School of Law and Diplomacy at Tufts University in the United States in 2014.

== Career – government and politics ==
From 2004-2008, Kalandadze was a member of parliament and held the position of deputy chairperson of the Legal Affairs Committee. In this role, she coordinated legislative efforts to reform Georgian administrative law, co-authored and initiated the draft Administrative Code of Georgia, and represented the parliamentary delegation to the Council of Europe. She also served as a member of the High Council of Justice and the Georgian Pardoning Commission.

From 2008-2012, Kalandadze served as Deputy Minister of Foreign Affairs of Georgia, overseeing bilateral relations with 45 European countries. She acted as the principal liaison for the Georgian government during and after the 2008 Russo-Georgian War, actively engaging in international talks, ceasefire negotiations, and contributing to the elaboration and implementation of the "Non-Recognition Policy" of the breakaway regions of Abkhazia and South Ossetia. Kalandadze facilitated the implementation of the "Steinmeier's Plan" aimed at integrating the breakaway regions into the Georgian political process. She led the EU-Georgia Talks in 2008, managed and supervised the Consular Department and internal/external communications, and served as the Parliamentary Secretary and official Spokesperson for the Ministry.

In 2012-2013, she served as an advisor to the president of Georgia, followed by a position as parliamentary secretary at the administration of the president in 2013. She was a board member of the political council of United National Movement party (UNM) in 2016–2018 and also headed the Strategic Communication Committee of UNM.

== Academia ==
Kalandadze worked as a legal expert on administrative law for the German International Cooperation agency GIZ from 2001 to 2004.

In academia, she was a lecturer and assistant professor at Caucasus University's School of Governance from 2012 to 2014. Kalandadze then served as academic program director from 2013 to 2014, and later as dean at Caucasus University's School of Tourism from 2014 to 2023.

== Public activities ==
Since 2018, Kalandadze has been the Co - founder and Executive Director of the Chavchavadze Center for European Studies and Civic Education, the first civil society organization in Georgia modeled after European political foundations. The Center is an independent and nonpartisan institution with an ambitious, long-term vision of transforming Georgia through education, spread of critical thinking and cultivating a sense of individual responsibility. Named after Ilia Chavchavadze, a lasting symbol of Georgia’s national revival, the Center aims to promote active citizenship and civic engagement, within the overall framework of democracy promotion.It is also focused on creating a more transparent and accountable political system. The Center is dedicated to promoting democratic Western values, supporting political pluralism, protecting mainstream political agenda and fostering a more informed, rational decision-making and political discourse both by citizens as well as Georgia’s political class.

The main projects of the Chavchavadze Center include:

- Civic Memory
- Project Common Sense – Civil Society vis-à-vis Politics
- Youth for Justice
- Intra-Party Democracy in Georgia
- Countering Disinformation in Georgia
- Agora Discussion and Debate Club
- Magazine New Iveria.

While working with various interest groups, the Center’s emphasis and primary focus is on the youth and those Georgians who are currently less exposed to the West.

Kalandadze is a frequent public speaker on Georgia's foreign policy and internal politics.

== Personal life ==
Nino Kalandadze is married to Zaza Bibilashvili and has one son.

== Publications ==
Kalandadze has authored or co-authored several publications, including:

- Power Shifts in Post-Soviet States: Political Opportunities and the Role of Political Parties - Comparative Analysis (co-author, 2024)
- The Time to Gather Stones – Overcoming Georgia's Two-party Divide (2023)
- Causes of the Intra-party Democracy Deficit in Georgia (co-author, 2022)
- Consequences of Deficit of Intra-party Democracy in Georgia (co-author, 2022)
- Intra-party Democracy in Georgia (co-author, 2020)
- Liberalism and Georgia (co-author, 2020)
- Manual on the General Administrative Code of Georgia (co-author, 2005)
- Legal Regulations on Euthanasia in Georgia (conference chapter, 2001)
- The Fight for Freedom: Georgia's Battle Against Authoritarianism
- Judicial Reform in Georgia
- Democracy in a Hijacked State

Kalandadze has also contributed to legislative reforms such as Georgia's General Administrative Code, anti-corruption legislation amendments, and anti-money laundering amendments.

== Other activities ==
Kalandadze is a member of the Georgian Bar Association and has experience in consulting on public administration and anti-corruption reform. She has contributed as a trainer and lecturer for organizations such as the Konrad Adenauer Foundation and the Friedrich Naumann Foundation, focusing on topics such as intra-party democracy, political parties, foreign policy, and negotiation skills.

== Honors and awards ==
Kalandadze has received several honors and awards, including:

- Presidential Order of Honors (Georgia)
- Presidential Order of Excellence (Georgia)
- Diplomatic Rank of Envoy Extraordinary and Plenipotentiary of Georgia
- Full Scholarship, Birklehof School (Germany)
- Scholarship, The Fletcher School of Law and Diplomacy (USA)
