= Giorgi Kharebashvili =

Georgian association football player

Personal information
- Date of birth: 22 August 1996 (age 30)
- Place of birth: Georgia
- Height: 1.77 m (5 ft 10 in)
- Position: Forward

Team information
- Current team: Dinamo Tbilisi

Senior career*
Years	Team	Apps	(Gls)
2013–2014	Dila II	2	(0)
2014–2015	Iberia 2010	11	(2)
2015–2016	Sakartvelos Universiteti	22	(29)
2018–2019	Telavi	29	(9)
2019	→ Gagra (loan)	15	(2)
2020	Rustavi	18	(10)
2021	Shevardeni 1906	4	(0)
2021–2023	Gareji	90	(52)
2024–2025	Gagra	72	(18)
2026–	Dinamo Tbilisi	0	(0)
- * Club domestic league appearances and goals as of 8 December 2025

Giorgi Kharebashvili (Georgian: გიორგი ხარებაშვილი; born 22 August 1996) is a Georgian footballer who plays as a forward for Erovnuli Liga club Dinamo Tbilisi.

Kharebashvili is the three-time team topscorer at two different clubs. He was also selected by the Erovnuli Liga as one of the distinguished player of the 2024 season.

== Career ==
Kharebashvili started his career at Dila's reserve team in the Pirveli Liga. In 2017, he joined 3rd league side Telavi and as the team was battling for promotion, gave them the lead in a 2–1 play-off game against Guria. Telavi beat the opponents on aggregate and advanced to the 2nd division with Kharebashvili staying two more years at the club.

In 2020, Kharebashvili moved to Rustavi. With ten goals netted in 18 matches he became the second topscorer of the team and the third of the league season.

The next year, Kharebashvili signed for newly promoted 2nd tier club Gareji where he was the team topscorer for two successive years with combined 34 goals. On 27 November 2021, he scored six goals in an 8–0 win over Chikhura with his performance labeled by some media outlets as fantastic.

In 2023, Kharebashvili contributed with 18 goals and 11 assists to Gareji who secured the silver medals. He netted in both play-off matches against Samtredia although his side failed to earn another promotion after a 5–4 aggregate loss. Shortly he left the club after having made 98 appearances in both competitions during a three-year period.

In early 2024, Erovnuli Liga side Gagra introduced Kharebashvili as their new squad member. The player enjoyed an impressive start to the top-flight season. He took part in each of 36 league games with a tally of 11 goals which was the best result among his teammates. Kharebashvili also scored three goals during Gagra's cup campaign, including in the semifinals, but despite him converting from the spot in a penalty shoot-out, Gagra crashed out of the tournament. Kharebashvili's impact was duly appreciated. While the club extended his existing contract, the Erovnuli Liga named him as best player of the league's final fourth part, selecting him in team of 11 players as well.

In January 2026, Kharebashvili moved to Dinamo Tbilisi on a year-long deal.

== Honours ==
=== Club ===
Gareji

- Erovnuli Liga 2 runner-up: 2023

=== Individual ===
- Team topscorer: 2021, 2022, 2024, 2025
- Erovnuli Liga best player: 2024 (part 4)
