= Lelo (newspaper) =

Sports newspaper

- Type: Newspaper
- Founded: 1934; 91 years ago
- Headquarters: Tbilisi, Georgia

Lelo (Georgian: ლელო) is the oldest Sports newspaper in Georgia. It was founded in 1934 as the Georgian Athlete and was later remained as Lelo.
