= Aleksandre Kalandadze =

Georgian footballer

Personal information
- Date of birth: 9 May 2001 (age 25)
- Place of birth: Tbilisi, Georgia
- Height: 1.85 m (6 ft 1 in)
- Position: Centre-back

Team information
- Current team: Dinamo Tbilisi

Youth career
- Dinamo Tbilisi

Senior career*
Years	Team	Apps	(Gls)
2020–2025	Dinamo Tbilisi	89	(4)
2020–2021	→ Diósgyőri II (loan)	21	(0)
2023–2025	Dinamo Tbilisi II	3	(0)
2025	→ Fehérvár (loan)	10	(0)
2025–2026	Wisła Płock	8	(0)
2026–	Dinamo Tbilisi	0	(0)

International career^{‡}
2018	Georgia U17	7	(0)
2019–2020	Georgia U19	13	(0)
2021–2023	Georgia U21	15	(0)
2023	Georgia	2	(0)
- * Club domestic league appearances and goals as of 25 February 2026 ‡ National team caps and goals as of 25 February 2026

Aleksandre Kalandadze (Georgian: ალექსანდრე კალანდაძე; born 9 May 2001) is a Georgian professional footballer who plays as a centre-back for Erovnuli Liga club Dinamo Tbilisi.

== Club career ==
Kalandadze is a youth product of the Georgian club Dinamo Tbilisi. He began his senior career on a loan with the Hungarian club Diósgyőri for the 2020–21 season, where he played with their reserves. He returned to Dinamo Tbilisi the following season, where he became their starting centre-back and helped them win the 2022 Erovnuli Liga and 2023 Georgian Super Cup. On 25 January 2022 he extended his contract with the club until the end of 2024.

After spending the first half of 2025 on loan at Hungarian side Fehérvár, on 2 July 2025 Kalandadze joined Polish club Wisła Płock on a two-year deal, with an option for another year.

On 24 February 2026, after only eight Ekstraklasa appearances for Wisła, he returned to Dinamo Tbilisi.

== International career ==
Kalandadze is a youth product of Georgia, having played up to the Georgia U21s. On 12 September 2023, he debuted with the senior Georgia national team in a UEFA Euro 2024 qualifying loss to Norway on 12 September 2023.

== Career statistics ==
=== International ===
As of match played 16 November 2023

Appearances and goals by national team and year
National team	Year	Apps	Goals
Georgia	2023	2	0
Total		2	0

== Honours ==
Dinamo Tbilisi

- Erovnuli Liga: 2022
