= 2024 FC Torpedo Kutaisi season =

Torpedo Kutaisi
2024 season
- Owner: New Vision University
- President: (Georgia (country)) Davit Kereselidze
- Manager: (Scotland) Steve Kean
- Stadium: Ramaz Shengelia Stadium
- Erovnuli Liga: 2nd
- Georgian Cup: Round of 16 (eliminated by Dinamo Tbilisi-2)
- Super Cup: Winners
- UEFA Conference League: 2nd qualifying round (eliminated by Omonia)
- Top goalscorer: League: Johnsen (23 goals); All: Johnsen (26 goals)
- Highest home attendance: 8,633 (vs Tirana, 11 July)
- Biggest win: 4–1 vs Samtredia, 2 March, Erovnuli Liga; 5–2 vs Kolkheti 1913, 19 May, Erovnuli Liga; 3–0 vs Gagra, 22 September Erovnuli Liga
- Biggest defeat: 0–4 vs Dinamo Tbilisi-2, 28 July, Georgian Cup; 1–5 vs Dila, 25 August, Erovnuli Liga
Home colours	Away colours

The 2024 season was Torpedo's 78th year in existence and 15th consecutive season in the top flight of Georgian football. In addition to the national league and cup competitions, the club also took part in this season's edition of UEFA Conference League.

The season covers the period from 1 January to 31 December 2024.

== Overview ==
Torpedo were expected to join the Dinamo duo for the title race due to an impressive second half of the 2023 season (11W, 7D, 1L) and high quality of new players who reinforced the squad. Following an emphatic 4–1 win over Samtredia in an opening match of the season, Torpedo suffered three losses in next four matches and slumped to 6th position which prompted the fanbase to fire a warning shot towards the management. As the team returned to winning ways, a fifteen-game unbeaten run followed, which included an eight-match winning streak. Eventually, Torpedo managed to climb back to the top three by the summer break.

In early July, Torpedo won a four-team Supercup tournament for the third time since 2018 after a 2–1 victory over Dinamo Tbilisi. Their European campaign, though, once again did not go beyond two rounds as they were clearly outperformed by Omonia. Torpedo suffered another setback in the national cup, partially resulting from squad rotation.

With Dinamo Tbilisi and Dinamo Batumi both dropped out of the league title fight for the first time in six years, Torpedo had to face two other challengers, Dila and Iberia 1999 instead. The team blew the chance to reach the summit of the table on 25 August when they endured a shock 5–1 home defeat from Dila. However, a month later they secured a narrow victory against Samgurali despite being reduced to ten men within 16 minutes of the first half and moved top of the table. Оn 6 October, Torpedo could have extended their lead to five points had the team defeated a rock-bottom Samtredia, but an injury-time loss meant that their eleven-game unbeaten away run came to an end with the race left wide open.

The club performed below expectations in the last two months, picking up just one point in five away matches. Ultimately, this circumstance determined the outcome of this league season for Torpedo who failed to accomplish the main goal but managed to secure the 2nd place - the highest point in last seven years - in addition to the Super Cup.

== Transfers ==
=== In ===
Date	No.	Pos.	Player	From	Ref
19 January	11	MF	(Guinea-Bissau) Jorginho	(Kazakhstan) Ordabasy	
20 January	20	MF	(Brazil) Éliton Júnior	(Finland) KuPS	
25 January	9	FW	(Norway) Bjørn Maars Johnsen	(South Korea) Seoul	
31 January	14	MF	(Brazil) Felipe Pires	(Ukraine) Dnipro-1	
12 April	21	DF	(Brazil) Auro Alvaro	(Kazakhstan) Ordabasy	
11 June	12	DF	(France) Mamadou Sakho	–	
4 July	23	MF	(Georgia (country)) Tsotne Patsatsia	(Georgia (country)) Dinamo Batumi	
4 July	18	MF	(Georgia (country)) Irakli Bidzinashvili	(Kazakhstan) Zhenis	
12 July	19	FW	(Guinea) Momo Yansane	(Croatia) Rijeka	
15 July	2	DF	(Brazil) Warley Leandro da Silva	(Brazil) Mirassol	
28 July	4	MF	(Nigeria) Tim Oloko-Obi	–	
8 November		MF	(Georgia (country)) Paata Gudushauri		

=== Out ===
Date	No.	Pos.	Player	To	Ref
19 January	–	FW	(Georgia (country)) Tornike Akhvlediani	(Georgia (country)) Telavi	
19 January	20	MF	(Georgia (country)) Irakli Bugridze	(Kazakhstan) Kyzylzhar	
19 January	38	MF	(Brazil) Kayke David	(Brazil) Nova Iguaçu	
21 January	2	DF	(Georgia (country)) Saba Goglichidze	(Italy) Empoli	
21 June	4	DF	(Georgia (country)) Mate Abuladze	(Georgia (country)) Samgurali	
20 July	3	DF	(Portugal) Pedro Monteiro	(Indonesia) Madura United	
	8	FW	(Georgia (country)) Giorgi Arabidze	(South Korea) Ulsan HD	
8 September	6	MF	(Afghanistan) Rahmat Akbari		

=== Loans out ===
Date	No.	Pos.	Player	To	Return	Ref
12 February	11	MF	(Afghanistan) Omran Haydary	(Georgia (country)) Samtredia	End of season	
15 July	2	DF	(Georgia (country)) Luka Elbakidze	(Georgia (country)) Samtredia	End of season	
15 July	19	FW	(Cameroon) Francois Ekongolo	(Georgia (country)) Samtredia	End of season	
5 July	23	FW	(Georgia (country)) Davit Imedadze	(Georgia (country)) Aragvi	End of season	

== Squad ==
Players and squad numbers last updated on 8 December 2024. Appearances include the Erovnuli Liga only.

Note: Flags indicate national team as has been defined under FIFA eligibility rules. Players may hold more than one non-FIFA nationality.

No.	Player	Nat.	Date of birth (age)	Signed in	Apps.	Goals
Goalkeepers
1	Oto Goshadze	(Georgia (country))	13 October 1997 (age 28)	2023	20	0
28	Avtandil Meparishvili	(Georgia (country))	8 January 2006 (age 20)	2023	0	0
31	Filip Kljajić	(Serbia)	16 August 1990 (age 35)	2023	46	0
35	Luka Kvetenadze	(Georgia (country))	2 March 2006 (age 20)	2024	0	0
Defenders
2	Warley Leandro da Silva	(Brazil)	17 September 1999 (age 26)	2024	15	0
4	Tim Oloko-Obi	(Nigeria)	15 May 2004 (age 21)	2024	7	0
5	Tsotne Nadaraia	(Georgia (country))	21 February 1997 (age 29)	2019	130	2
12	Mamadou Sakho	(France)	13 February 1990 (age 36)	2024	11	0
15	Juba Dvalishvili	(Georgia (country))	6 September 2004 (age 21)	2023	1	0
16	Nika Sandokhadze	(Georgia (country))	20 February 1994 (age 32)	2022	85	5
17	Mate Topadze	(Georgia (country))	1 January 2007 (age 19)	2024	0	0
21	Auro Alvaro	(Brazil)	23 January 1996 (age 30)	2024	19	0
22	Giorgi Mchedlishvili	(Georgia (country))	18 January 1992 (age 34)	2022	63	0
24	Amiran Tkeshelashvili	(Georgia (country))	11 July 2006 (age 19)	2023	1	0
27	Lasha Shergelashvili	(Georgia (country))	17 January 1992 (age 34)	2022	79	9
Midfielders
7	Merab Gigauri (C)	(Georgia (country))	5 June 1993 (age 32)	2022	62	2
13	Giuli Manjgaladze	(Georgia (country))	9 September 1992 (age 33)	2022	84	3
14	Felipe Pires	(Brazil)	18 April 1995 (age 30)	2024	34	6
18	Irakli Bidzinashvili	(Georgia (country))	27 February 1997 (age 29)	2024	12	1
20	Eliton Junior	(Brazil)	28 January 1998 (age 28)	2024	26	3
23	Tsotne Patsatsia	(Georgia (country))	28 March 2000 (age 25)	2024	15	3
26	Aleko Basiladze	(Georgia (country))	30 December 2005 (age 20)	2023	15	1
30	Luka Rekhviashvili	(Georgia (country))	27 June 2007 (age 18)	2024	1	0
33	Saba Gureshidze	(Georgia (country))	5 March 2004 (age 21)	2023	0	0
40	Luka Mzhavanadze	(Georgia (country))	28 February 2004 (age 22)	2019	1	0
Forwards
9	Bjørn Maars Johnsen	(Norway)	6 November 1991 (age 34)	2024	34	23
10	Nikola Ninković	(Serbia)	19 December 1994 (age 31)	2023	37	10
11	Jorginho	(Guinea-Bissau)	21 September 1995 (age 30)	2024	22	1
19	Momo Yansane	(Guinea)	29 August 1997 (age 28)	2024	11	3

== Pre-season friendlies ==
Date	Venue	Opponents	Result	Goalscorers	Ref.
7 February	H	Merani	3–1	Shergelashvili, Jorginho (2)	
13 February	Valencia	Stabek	1–2	Monteiro	
15 February	Valencia	Hércules	1–0	Arabidze	
17 February	Valencia	Levadia	3–1	Johnsen, Arabidze (2)	
20 February	Valencia	Villarreal B	4–1	Arabidze (3), Pires	

== Competitions ==
=== Overview ===
Competition	First match	Last match	Starting round	Final position	Record							
Competition	First match	Last match	Starting round	Final position	Pld	W	D	L	GF	GA	GD	Win %
Erovnuli Liga	2 March	8 December	Matchday 1	2nd	36	21	7	8	58	40	+18	58.33
Georgian Cup	28 July	28 July	Round of 16	Round of 16	1	0	0	1	0	4	−4	0.00
Super Cup	28 June	3 July	Semifinal	Winners	2	1	1	0	5	4	+1	50.00
UEFA Conference League	11 July	1 August	1st qualifying round	2nd qualifying round	4	1	1	2	4	6	−2	25.00
Total					43	23	9	11	67	54	+13	53.49

Source: Competitions

=== Erovnuli Liga ===
==== League Table (part) ====
Pos	Team	Pld	W	D	L	GF	GA	GD	Pts	Qualification or relegation
1	Iberia 1999 (C)	36	23	6	7	74	46	+28	75	Qualification for the Champions League first qualifying round
2	Torpedo Kutaisi	36	21	7	8	58	40	+18	70	Qualification for the Conference League first qualifying round
3	Dila Gori	36	19	11	6	58	30	+28	68	Qualification for the Conference League first qualifying round
4	Dinamo Batumi	36	15	10	11	42	41	+1	55	
5	Samgurali Tsqaltubo	36	11	11	14	51	49	+2	44	

Source: Erovnuli Liga, Soccerway
Rules for classification: 1) Points; 2) Head-to-head points; 3) Head-to-head goal difference; 4) Head-to-head goals scored; 5) Head-to-head away goals scored (only if two teams); 6) Goal difference; 7) Goals scored.
(C) Champions

==== Results summary ====
Overall								Home						Away					
Pld	W	D	L	GF	GA	GD	Pts	W	D	L	GF	GA	GD	W	D	L	GF	GA	GD
36	21	7	8	58	40	+18	70	15	1	2	31	15	+16	6	6	6	27	25	+2

Source: See Results

==== Results by round ====
Round	1	2	3	4	5	6	7	8	9	10	11	12	13	14	15	16	17	18	19	20	21	22	23	24	25	26	27	28	29	30	31	32	33	34	35	36
Ground	H	H	A	H	A	H	A	H	A	A	A	H	A	H	A	H	A	H	H	A	H	A	H	H	A	H	A	A	A	H	A	H	A	H	A	H
Result	W	L	L	W	L	W	W	W	D	D	D	D	D	W	W	W	W	W	W	W	L	D	W	W	W	W	W	L	L	W	D	W	L	W	L	W
Position	1	5	7	5	6	4	4	4	4	4	4	4	4	4	4	4	2	2	2	2	2	3	3	2	2	1	1	1	3	2	2	2	2	2	3	2

Source: See Results
A = Away; H = Home; W = Win; D = Draw; L = Loss

==== Match details ====
Date	Opponents	Venue	Result	Score	Scorer(s)
2 March	Samtredia	H	W	4–1	o.g. 5', Johnsen 8', 66', Arabidze 30' (pen.)
6 March	Iberia 1999	H	L	2–3	Johnsen 86', Ninković 90+3'
10 March	Dinamo Tbilisi	A	L	0–1	
15 March	Dila	H	W	1–0	Arabidze 45+1'
29 March	Dinamo Batumi	A	L	2–3	Pires 14', Johnsen 41' (pen.)
2 April	Kolkheti 1913	H	W	3–2	Arabidze 27', 80', Shergelashvili 69'
7 April	Gagra	A	W	1–0	Johnsen 35'
11 April	Samgurali	H	W	3–1	Ninković 49', Johnsen 83', Basiladze 90+7'
15 April	Telavi	A	D	0–0	
20 April	Samtredia	A	D	0–0	
27 April	Iberia 1999	A	D	3–3	Pires 34', Arabidze 72' (pen.), Johnsen 90+3'
2 May	Dinamo Tbilisi	H	D	0–0	
10 May	Dila	A	D	1–1	Sandokhadze 45+2'
15 May	Dinamo Batumi	H	W	1–0	Eliton Junior 28'
19 May	Kolkheti 1913	A	W	5–2	Eliton Junior 23', Jorginho 38', Johnsen 59', Pires 87', Ninković 90+1'
24 May	Gagra	H	W	2–1	Pires 86', Johnsen 90+5'
28 May	Samgurali	A	W	3–1	Gigauri 54', Johnsen 61', Ninković 83
1 June	Telavi	H	W	1–0	Johnsen 6' (pen.)
5 August	Samtredia	H	W	2–1	Yansane 36', Shergelashvili 90+6'
18 August	Dinamo Tbilisi	A	W	2–1	Yansane 35', 42'
25 August	Dila	H	L	1–5	Johnsen 17' (pen.)
1 September	Dinamo Batumi	A	D	1–1	Johnsen 84'
14 September	Kolkheti 1913	H	W	2–0	Patsatsia 75', Johnsen 90+1
18 September	Iberia 1999	H	W	2–1	Johnsen 77', Patsatsia 81'
22 September	Gagra	A	W	3–0	Sandokhadze 45+2', Eliton Junior 49', Johnsen 55'
26 September	Samgurali	H	W	1–0	Johnsen 77' (pen.)
30 September	Telavi	A	W	2–1	Johnsen 12' (pen.), 61'
6 October	Samtredia	A	L	1–2	Patsatsia 57'
20 October	Iberia 1999	A	L	0–3	
28 October	Dinamo Tbilisi	H	W	2–0	Sandokhadze 82', Johnsen 90+2'
2 November	Dila	A	D	1–1	Johnsen 21'
8 November	Dinamo Batumi	H	W	1–0	Ninković 78'
23 November	Kolkheti 1913	A	L	1–3	Pires 57'
27 November	Gagra	H	W	2–0	Pires 45+7' (pen.), Bidzinashvili 76'
1 December	Samgurali	A	L	1–2	Johnsen 37' (pen.)
8 December	Telavi	H	W	1–0	Johnsen 34'

=== Super Cup ===
28 June 2024 Semifinal	Dinamo Batumi	3–3 (2–3 p)	Torpedo	Batumi
21:00 GET	Mamuchashvili 12' (pen.), Gudushauri 25', 84'	Report	Johnsen 19', 73', Jorginho 90+3'	Stadium: Batumi Stadium; Referee: A.Aptsiauri
	Penalties
	(penalty missed) Mamuchashvili; (penalty missed) Kharabadze; (penalty scored) Mara; (penalty scored) Gomis; (penalty missed) Gudushauri		(penalty scored) Johnsen; (penalty missed) Manjgaladze; (penalty scored) Pires; (penalty missed) Gigauri; (penalty scored) Arabidze

3 July 2024 Final	Dinamo Tbilisi	1–2	Torpedo	Tbilisi
21:00 GET	Tsetskhladze 85'	Report	Eliton Junior 4'; Ninković 61'	Stadium: Davit Petriashvili Arena; Referee: G.Kruashvili

=== Georgian Cup ===
28 July 2024 Round of 16	Dinamo Tbilisi-2	4–0	Torpedo	Tbilisi
17:00 GET	Iobashvili 5' (pen.); Pridonishvili 44; Chikovani 49'; Odikadze 63'	Report		Stadium: Vitali Daraselia Arena; Referee: I.Shengelia

=== UEFA Conference League ===
==== 1st qualifying round ====
11 July 2024 1st leg	Torpedo	1–1	KF Tirana	Kutaisi
21:00 GET	Mici 20' o.g.	Report	Haxhiu 87'	Stadium: Ramaz Shengelia Stadium; Attendance: 8,633; Referee: Zaven Hovhannisyan (ARM)

18 July 2024 2nd leg	KF Tirana	0–1	Torpedo	Tirana
22:00 GET		Report	Johnsen 2'	Stadium: Arena Kombëtare; Attendance: 1,800; Referee: Dalibor Černý (CZE)

==== 2nd qualifying round ====
25 July 2024 1st leg	Omonia	3–1	Torpedo	Nicosia
20:30 GET	Coulibaly 41', 78'; Ewandro 84'	Report	Yansane 75'	Stadium: GSP Stadium; Attendance: 12,308; Referee: Martin Matoša (SVN)

1 August 2024 2nd leg	Torpedo	1–2	Omonia	Kutaisi
21:00 GET	Yansane 47'	Report	Stępiński 25'; Semedo 81' (pen.)	Stadium: Ramaz Shengelia Stadium; Attendance: 8,578; Referee: Ishmael Barbara (MLT)

== Statistics ==
=== Appearances, goals and discipline ===
No.	Pos.	Nat.	Name	League		Cup		Super Cup		UECL		Total		Discipline	
No.	Pos.	Nat.	Name	Apps	Goals	Apps	Goals	Apps	Goals	Apps	Goals	Apps	Goals	A yellow rectangle, denoting the yellow penalty card shown to a player being cautioned	A red rectangle, denoting the red penalty card shown to a player being sent off
1	GK	(Georgia (country))	Oto Goshadze	6	0	1	0	0	0	0	0	7	0	1	0
2	DF	(Brazil)	Warley Leandro da Silva	15	0	0	0	0	0	2	0	17	0	4	0
4	MF	(Nigeria)	Tim Oloko-Obi	7	0	1	0	0	0	0	0	8	0	1	0
5	DF	(Georgia (country))	Tsotne Nadaraia	30	0	1	0	2	0	4	0	37	0	7	1
7	MF	(Georgia (country))	Merab Gigauri	23	1	1	0	2	0	4	0	30	1	11	1
9	FW	(Norway)	Bjørn Maars Johnsen	34	23	0	0	2	2	4	1	40	26	4	1
10	FW	(Serbia)	Nikola Ninković	24	5	0	0	2	1	3	0	29	6	12	0
11	FW	(Guinea-Bissau)	Jorginho	22	1	0	0	1	1	3	0	26	2	1	0
12	DF	(France)	Mamadou Sakho	11	0	0	0	0	0	2	0	13	0	2	0
13	MF	(Georgia (country))	Giuli Manjgaladze	28	0	1	0	2	0	2	0	33	0	8	0
14	MF	(Brazil)	Felipe Pires	34	6	0	0	2	0	4	0	40	6	7	0
15	DF	(Georgia (country))	Juba Dvalishvili	1	0	1	0	0	0	0	0	2	0	0	0
16	DF	(Georgia (country))	Nika Sandokhadze	28	3	0	0	2	0	3	0	33	3	5	1
17	DF	(Georgia (country))	Mate Topadze	0	0	1	0	0	0	0	0	1	0	0	0
18	MF	(Georgia (country))	Irakli Bidzinashvili	12	1	1	0	0	0	3	0	16	1	3	0
19	FW	(Guinea)	Momo Yansane	11	3	0	0	0	0	2	2	13	5	3	0
20	MF	(Brazil)	Eliton Junior	26	3	0	0	1	1	4	0	31	4	8	0
21	DF	(Brazil)	Auro Alvaro	19	0	0	0	2	0	2	0	23	0	5	0
22	DF	(Georgia (country))	Giorgi Mchedlishvili	26	0	1	0	2	0	3	0	32	0	5	0
23	MF	(Georgia (country))	Tsotne Patsatsia	16	3	1	0	0	0	2	0	19	3	3	0
24	DF	(Georgia (country))	Amiran Tkeshelashvili	0	0	1	0	0	0	0	0	1	0	0	0
26	MF	(Georgia (country))	Aleko Basiladze	14	1	1	0	0	0	0	0	15	1	1	0
27	DF	(Georgia (country))	Lasha Shergelashvili	33	2	0	0	2	0	4	0	39	2	3	0
30	MF	(Georgia (country))	Luka Rekhviashvilil	1	0	1	0	0	0	0	0	2	0	0	0
31	GK	(Serbia)	Filip Kljajić	31	0	0	0	2	0	4	0	37	0	1	0
	MF	(Georgia (country))	Davit Kikalishvili	0	0	1	0	0	0	0	0	1	0	0	0
Players transferred out during the season
3	DF	(Portugal)	Pedro Monteiro	17	0	0	0	2	0	3	0	22	0	5	0
4	DF	(Georgia (country))	Mate Abuladze	7	0	0	0	0	0	0	0	7	0	1	0
6	MF	(Afghanistan)	Rahmat Akbari	13	0	0	0	0	0	0	0	13	0	2	0
8	FW	(Georgia (country))	Giorgi Arabidze	14	5	0	0	2	0	0	0	16	5	1	0
19	FW	(Cameroon)	Francois Ekongolo	2	0	0	0	0	0	0	0	2	0	0	0

=== Assists ===
Pl.	Pos.	No.	Name	Erovnuli Liga	Georgian Cup	Super Cup	UEFA Conference League	Total
1	MF	14	(Brazil) Felipe Pires	10	–	1	–	11
2	DF	27	(Georgia (country)) Lasha Shergelashvili	4	–	–	–	4
3	DF	5	(Georgia (country)) Tsotne Nadaraia	3	–	–	–	3
3	FW	8	(Georgia (country)) Giorgi Arabidze	3	–	–	–	3
3	FW	10	(Serbia) Nikola Ninković	3	–	–	–	3
3	MF	20	(Brazil) Eliton Junior	3	–	–	–	3
7	FW	11	(Guinea-Bissau) Jorginho	2	–	–	–	2
7	DF	22	(Georgia (country)) Giorgi Mchedlishvili	1	–	–	1	2
7	MF	23	(Georgia (country)) Tsotne Patsatsia	2	–	–	–	2
10	DF	2	(Brazil) Warley	–	–	–	1	1
10	MF	7	(Georgia (country)) Merab Gigauri	–	–	1	–	1
10	FW	9	(Norway) Bjørn Maars Johnsen	–	–	1	–	1
10	FW	19	(Guinea) Momo Yansane	1	–	–	–	1
10	DF	21	(Brazil) Auro Alvaro	–	–	–	1	1

=== Clean sheets ===
No.	Player	Erovnuli Liga	Georgian Cup	Super Cup	UEFA Conference League	Total
31	(Serbia) Filip Kljajić	12	–	–	1	13
1	(Georgia (country)) Oto Goshadze	4	–	–	–	4

== Awards ==
Several members of Torpedo were recognized by the Erovnuli Liga during the season.

No.	Pos.	Nat.	Winner	Award
9	FW	(Norway)	Bjørn Maars Johnsen	Team of 1st round Team of 2nd round Team of 3rd round Best Player of 2nd round Forward of the Year
8	FW	(Georgia (country))	Giorgi Arabidze	Team of 1st round
14	MF	(Brazil)	Felipe Pires	Team of 2nd round
20	MF	(Brazil)	Eliton Junior	Team of 2nd round
21	DF	(Brazil)	Auro Alvaro	Team of 2nd round
16	DF	(Georgia (country))	Nika Sandokhadze	Team of 3rd round
27	DF	(Georgia (country))	Lasha Shergelashvili	Team of 3rd round
31	GK	(Serbia)	Filip Kljajić	Team of 3rd round
14	MF	(Brazil)	Felipe Pires	Team of 4th round
9	FW	(Norway)	Bjørn Maars Johnsen	Team of the Season
16	DF	(Georgia (country))	Nika Sandokhadze	Team of the Season
27	DF	(Georgia (country))	Lasha Shergelashvili	Team of the Season
	Coach	(Scotland)	Steve Kean	Manager of 3rd round

Note: Since the season consisted of four parts, each round is equal to nine matches.
