= 2023 FC Torpedo Kutaisi season =

Torpedo Kutaisi
2023 season
- Chairman: (Georgia (country)) Davit Kereselidze
- Manager: (Georgia (country)) Kakha Chkhetiani (until 8 May) (Scotland) Steve Kean (after 17 May)
- Stadium: Ramaz Shengelia Stadium
- Erovnuli Liga: 3rd
- Georgian Cup: Quarterfinals
- Georgian Super Cup: 3rd
- UEFA Conference League: Second Qualifying Round
- Top goalscorer: League: Giorgi Arabidze (14 goals); All: Giorgi Arabidze (16 goals)
- Biggest win: 9–0 vs Shukura (H), 28 November, Erovnuli Liga
- Biggest defeat: 5–0 vs Dila (A), 30 April, Erovnuli Liga
Home colours	Away colours

The 2023 season was Torpedo's 77th year in existence and 14th consecutive season in the top flight of Georgian football. In addition to the national league and David Kipiani Cup, the club participated in this season's edition of the Georgian Super Cup and UEFA Europa Conference League as the cup holder of the previous year.

The season covers the period from 1 January to 31 December 2023. This was the second full season under the New Vision University management after they purchased the club in September 2021.

Аs Georgia co-hosted UEFA European U21 Championship this summer, Kutaisi's central stadium underwent a thorough reconstruction. For this reason, Torpedo were unable to play home matches at their arena until the 22nd round.

The team had a promising start to the season. With a single defeat in the initial nine games, they were 3rd, five points behind the table leaders. But having picked up six points in the next second nine-match period, they dropped to 6th. By the summer break, Torpedo had experienced a significant squad and staff overhaul, which included their head coach as well.

The club drastically improved in the second half of the season. They gained as many points in their last nine games (21) as in the first eighteen matches. Ultimately, Torpedo leapfrogged their three opponents and finished among the top three for the first time in five years.

== Events ==
On 13 January, Levan Mchedlidze, Dino Hamzić and Mate Tsintsadze left Torpedo while Oto Goshadze and Davit Samurkasovi joined the club.

On 20 January, Torpedo signed Kayke David.

On 11 February, the club announced the transfer of Nika Kacharava.

On 24 February, Torpedo welcomed Aldair Neto and Sunday Faleye.

On 31 March, Levan Osikmashvili was signed on loan from Dinamo Tbilisi until the end of the season.

On 8 May, head coach Kakha Chkhetiani left Torpedo by mutual agreement with the club sitting 6th in the league table.

On 16 May, Roin Kvaskhvadze, Giorgi Kimadze and Levan Gegetchkori left the team.

On 17 May, the club announced that Steve Kean was appointed as a new head coach.

On 27 May, Nika Kacharava parted ways with Torpedo.

On 16 June, Davit Samurkasovi and Giorgi Kukhianidze left the club.

On 23 June, Akaki Shulaia left Torpedo by mutual agreement.

On 28 June, assistant manager Nilton Terroso as well as players Rahmat Akbari, Francois Ekongolo and Filip Kljajić joined Torpedo.

On 8 July, Tornike Akhvlediani moved to Samtredia on loan.

On 12 July, Anri Chichinadze, Giorgi Pantsulaia and Nikola Ninković signed with Torpedo on 1.5 year-long deals each. They were joined by Omran Haydary.

On 24 July, Avtandil Labadze, Juba Dvalishvili and Sunday Faleye left for Samtredia.

On 2 December, after a 2–2 draw at Dinamo Batumi, Torpedo finished the season 3rd and secured both the bronze medals and a UEFA Europa Conference League spot for next year.

On 30 December, Torpedo announced that the contract with head coach Steve Kean was extended to the end of 2025 while players Mauro Caballero, Giorgi Kobuladze, Anri Chichinadze, Giorgi Pantsulaia and Aldair Neto left the club.

== Squad ==
All data regarding players and squad numbers are valid as of 2 December 2023, the last match of the 2023 season. Appearances include the Erovnuli Liga only.

Note: Flags indicate national team as has been defined under FIFA eligibility rules. Players may hold more than one non-FIFA nationality.

No.	Player	Nat.	Positions	Date of birth (age)	Signed in	Apps.	Goals
Goalkeepers
1	Oto Goshadze	(Georgia (country))	GK	13 October 1997 (age 28)	2023	14	0
31	Filip Kljajić	(Serbia)	GK	16 August 1990 (age 35)	2023	15	0
30	Roin Kvaskhvadze	(Georgia (country))	GK	31 May 1989 (age 36)	2021	38	0
31	Avtandil Labadze	(Georgia (country))	GK	9 May 1998 (age 27)	2022	3	0
37	Avtandil Meparishvili	(Georgia (country))	GK	8 January 2006 (age 20)	2023	0	0
Defenders
25	Jemal Chachua	(Georgia (country))	DF	11 December 2004 (age 21)	2023	1	0
4	Anri Chichinadze	(Georgia (country))	DF	5 October 1997 (age 28)	2023	7	1
18	Levan Gegetchkori	(Georgia (country))	DF	5 June 1994 (age 31)	2022	23	0
2	Saba Goglichidze	(Georgia (country))	DF	25 June 2004 (age 21)	2021	30	0
8	Giorgi Kimadze	(Georgia (country))	DF	11 February 1992 (age 34)	2022	33	0
15	Giorgi Kobuladze	(Georgia (country))	DF	26 February 1997 (age 29)	2023	22	1
22	Giorgi Mchedlishvili	(Georgia (country))	DF	18 January 1992 (age 34)	2022	37	0
3	Pedro Monteiro	(Portugal)	DF	30 January 1994 (age 32)	2022	46	1
5	Tsotne Nadaraia	(Georgia (country))	DF	21 February 1997 (age 29)	2019	100	2
16	Nika Sandokhadze	(Georgia (country))	DF	20 February 1994 (age 32)	2022	57	2
27	Lasha Shergelashvili	(Georgia (country))	DF	17 January 1992 (age 34)	2022	47	7
24	Amiran Tkeshelashvili	(Georgia (country))	DF	11 July 2006 (age 19)	2023	1	0
Midfielders
6	Rahmat Akbari	(Afghanistan)	MF	20 June 2000 (age 25)	2023	11	0
26	Aleko Basiladze	(Georgia (country))	MF	30 December 2005 (age 20)	2023	1	0
20	Irakli Bugridze	(Georgia (country))	MF	3 January 1998 (age 28)	2022	59	12
38	Kayke David	(Brazil)	MF	22 January 2003 (age 23)	2023	19	1
7	Merab Gigauri	(Georgia (country))	MF	5 June 1993 (age 32)	2022	39	1
10	Giorgi Kukhianidze	(Georgia (country))	MF	1 July 1992 (age 33)	2022	37	11
13	Giuli Manjgaladze	(Georgia (country))	MF	9 September 1992 (age 33)	2022	56	3
21	Aldair Neto	(Portugal)	MF	22 July 1994 (age 31)	2023	27	0
6	Levan Osikmashvili	(Georgia (country))	MF	20 April 2002 (age 23)	2023	6	0
17	Davit Samurkasovi	(Georgia (country))	MF	5 February 1998 (age 28)	2023	16	0
11	Akaki Shulaia	(Georgia (country))	MF	6 September 1996 (age 29)	2022	46	2
Forwards
9	Tornike Akhvlediani	(Georgia (country))	FW	24 July 1999 (age 26)	2021	46	12
8	Giorgi Arabidze	(Georgia (country))	FW	4 March 1998 (age 28)	2022	59	19
39	Mauro Caballero	(Paraguay)	FW	8 October 1994 (age 31)	2022	30	3
9	Francois Ekongolo	(Cameroon)	FW	12 August 2004 (age 21)	2023	8	2
40	Sunday Faleye	(Nigeria)	FW	29 November 1998 (age 27)	2023	15	0
11	Omran Haydary	(Afghanistan)	FW	13 January 1998 (age 28)	2023	8	0
35	Davit Imedadze	(Georgia (country))	FW	10 August 2004 (age 21)	2023	1	2
14	Nika Kacharava	(Georgia (country))	FW	13 January 1994 (age 32)	2023	14	3
10	Nikola Ninković	(Serbia)	FW	19 December 1994 (age 31)	2023	13	5
14	Giorgi Pantsulaia	(Georgia (country))	FW	6 January 1994 (age 32)	2023	13	3

== Pre-season friendlies ==
Win Draw Loss

21 January 2023	CSKA 1948	0–0	Torpedo	Belek, Turkey
		Report

28 January 2023	Liptovský Mikuláš	2–2	Torpedo	Belek, Turkey
16:30		Report		Stadium: Venue Emirhan Sport Center Stadium

3 February 2023	Torpedo	0–0	Metalist Kharkiv	Belek, Turkey
17:00		Report		Stadium: Venue Emirhan Sport Center Stadium

6 February 2023	Riga	2–0	Torpedo	Belek, Turkey
14:00		Report		Stadium: Venue Emirhan Sport Center Stadium

10 February 2023	Lviv	1–0	Torpedo	Belek, Turkey
17:00		Report

== Competitions ==
=== Overview ===
Competition	First match	Last match	Starting round	Final position	Record							
Competition	First match	Last match	Starting round	Final position	Pld	W	D	L	GF	GA	GD	Win %
Erovnuli Liga	26 February 2023	2 December 2023	Matchday 1	3rd	36	16	12	8	55	37	+18	44.44
Georgian Cup	7 September 2023	25 October 2023	Round of 16	Quarterfinals	2	1	0	1	3	2	+1	50.00
Super Cup	30 June 2023	4 July 2023	Semifinals	3rd	2	0	2	0	0	0	+0	0.00
UEFA Europa Conference League	13 July 2023	3 August 2023	1st qualifying round	2nd qualifying round	4	1	2	1	6	8	−2	25.00
Total					44	18	16	10	64	47	+17	40.91

Source: Competitions

=== Erovnuli Liga ===
==== Results summary ====
Overall								Home						Away					
Pld	W	D	L	GF	GA	GD	Pts	W	D	L	GF	GA	GD	W	D	L	GF	GA	GD
36	16	12	8	55	37	+18	60	9	4	5	35	20	+15	7	8	3	20	17	+3

Last updated: complete.
Source: See Results

==== Results by round ====
Round	1	2	3	4	5	6	7	8	9	10	11	12	13	14	15	16	17	18	19	20	21	22	23	24	25	26	27	28	29	30	31	32	33	34	35	36
Ground	A	H	A	H	A	H	A	A	H	H	A	H	A	H	A	H	H	A	H	A	A	H	A	H	A	A	H	H	A	H	A	H	A	H	H	A
Result	D	D	W	W	D	W	L	W	D	L	L	W	D	L	L	L	L	D	W	W	W	W	D	W	D	D	L	W	W	W	W	D	W	D	W	D

Source: See Results
A = Away; H = Home; W = Win; D = Draw; L = Loss

=== Results ===
26 February 2023 1	Saburtalo	0–0	Torpedo	Rustavi
17:00		Report		Stadium: Technical Centre; Referee: G.Kruashvili

3 March 2023 2	Torpedo	0–0	Dila	Samtredia
15:30		Report		Stadium: Erosi Manjgaladze Stadium; Referee: A.Aptsiauri

8 March 2023 3	Samtredia	0–2	Torpedo	Samtredia
15:30		Report	Arabidze 33'; Kacharava 66'	Stadium: Erosi Manjgaladze Stadium; Referee: G.Avazashvili

12 March 2023 4	Torpedo	3–1	Gagra	Samtredia
15:30	Kacharava 7', 39'; Arabidze 48'	Report	Boutrif 2'	Stadium: Erosi Manjgaladze Stadium; Referee: D.Kharitonashvili

19 March 2023 5	Samgurali	0–0	Torpedo	Zestaponi
15:30		Report		Stadium: David Abashidze Stadium; Referee: A.Aptsiauri

1 April 2023 6	Torpedo	2–1	Telavi	Samtredia
15:30	Bugridze 50'; Monteiro 88'	Report	Patsatsia 66'	Stadium: Erosi Manjgaladze Stadium; Referee: A.Nonikashvili

8 April 2023 7	Dinamo Tbilisi	2–1	Torpedo	Gori
20:00	Imran 45+2'; Gonsalves 82'	Report	Manjgaladze 78'	Stadium: Tengiz Burjanadze Stadium; Referee: G.Kruashvili

12 April 2023 8	Shukura	0–2	Torpedo	Samtredia
14:00		Report	Nadaraia 40'; Bugridze 90+1'	Stadium: Erosi Manjgaladze Stadium; Referee: A.Aptsiauri

21 April 2023 9	Torpedo	0–0	Dinamo Batumi	Samtredia
16:00		Report		Stadium: Erosi Manjgaladze Stadium; Referee: J.Khorava

25 April 2023 10	Torpedo	0–3	Saburtalo	Samtredia
16:00		Report	G.Mamageishvili 26'; Tabatadze 39' (pen.); O.Mamageishvili 57'	Stadium: Erosi Manjgaladze Stadium; Referee: G.Avazashvili

30 April 2023 11	Dila	5–0	Torpedo	Gori
21:00	Chiteishvili 42'; Gagnidze 46'; Gale 59', 70'; Tsetskhladze 83'	Report		Stadium: Tengiz Burjanadze Stadium; Referee: G.Kruashvili

6 May 2023 12	Torpedo	1–0	Samtredia	Samtredia
16:00	Kobuladze 70'	Report		Stadium: Erosi Manjgaladze Stadium; Referee: A.Aptsiauri

10 May 2023 13	Gagra	0–0	Torpedo	Tbilisi
15:00		Report		Stadium: Ilia Kokaia Football Centre; Referee: A.Nonikashvili

14 May 2023 14	Torpedo	1–3	Samgurali	Samtredia
16:30	Arabidze 87'	Report	Nikabadze 3', 44', 53'	Stadium: Erosi Manjgaladze Stadium; Referee: D.Kharitonashvili

20 May 2023 15	Telavi	1–0	Torpedo	Telavi
19:00	Vitinho 90+1'	Report		Stadium: Kavkasioni Arena; Referee: G.Avazashvili

24 May 2023 16	Torpedo	2–3	Dinamo Tbilisi	Samtredia
16:30	Kukhianidze 62'; Bugridze 66'	Report	Imran 4', 49'; Camara 90+11' (pen.)	Stadium: Erosi Manjgaladze Stadium; Referee: J.Khorava

28 May 2023 17	Torpedo	1–2	Shukura	Samtredia
14:00	Kayke David 90+4'	Report	Patsatsia 69' (pen.), 90+1'	Stadium: Erosi Manjgaladze Stadium; Referee: D.Kharitonashvili

1 June 2023 18	Dinamo Batumi	1–1	Torpedo	Batumi
21:00	Mamuchashvili 85' (pen.)	Report	Shergelashvili 90+7'	Stadium: Batumi Stadium; Referee: G.Avazashvili

5 June 2023 20	Torpedo	1–0	Dila	Samtredia
17:00	Kukhianidze 80' (pen.)	Report		Stadium: Erosi Manjgaladze Stadium; Referee: A.Nonikashvili

8 August 2023 19	Saburtalo	1–3	Torpedo	Tbilisi
20:00	Sylla 32'	Report	Caballero 58' (pen.); Jgerenaia 63' (o.g.); Ekongolo 90'	Stadium: Mikheil Meskhi reserve stadium Referee: D.Kharitonashvili

14 August 2023 21	Samtredia	2–3	Torpedo	Samtredia
17:00	Abuladze 12'; Kirkitadze 90+1'	Report	Caballero 37'; Arabidze 45+3'; I.Akhvlediani 73' (o.g.)	Stadium: Erosi Manjgaladze Stadium; Referee: G.Avazashvili

20 August 2023 22	Torpedo	4–1	Gagra	Kutaisi
20:00	Arabidze 18' (pen.), 66'; Bugridze 44'; Pantsulaia 88' (pen.)	Report	Claudinei 49'	Stadium: Ramaz Shengelia Stadium; Referee: G.Avazashvili

27 August 2023 23	Samgurali	0–0	Torpedo	Tskaltubo
17:00		Report		Stadium: 26 May Stadium; Referee: A.Aptsiauri

1 September 2023 24	Torpedo	2–1	Telavi	Kutaisi
20:00	Arabidze 43'; Shergelashvili 67'	Report	Morchiladze 15'	Stadium: Ramaz Shengelia Stadium; Referee: G.Avazashvili

16 September 2023 25	Dinamo Tbilisi	1–1	Torpedo	Tbilisi
20:00	Camara 41'	Report	Bugridze 53'	Stadium: Boris Paichadze Dinamo Arena; Referee: G.Kruashvili

23 September 2023 26	Shukura	0–0	Torpedo	Zestaponi
15:30		Report		Stadium: David Abashidze Stadium; Referee: K.Giorgadze

28 September 2023 27	Torpedo	0–3	Dinamo Batumi	Kutaisi
20:00		Report	Zaria 55'; Flamarion 59'; Gudushauri 81'	Stadium: Ramaz Shengelia Stadium; Referee: G.Kruashvili

3 October 2023 28	Torpedo	5–0	Saburtalo	Kutaisi
18:00	Shergelshvili 25'; Arabidze 29', 59' (pen.); Bugridze 43'; Ninković 90+2'	Report		Stadium: Ramaz Shengelia Stadium; Referee: J.Khorava

7 October 2023 29	Dila	0–1	Torpedo	Gori
20:00		Report	Bugridze 28'	Stadium: Tengiz Burjanadze Stadium; Referee: G.Vardidze

21 October 2023 30	Torpedo	2–0	Samtredia	Kutaisi
20:00	Arabidze 34' (pen.), 85'	Report		Stadium: Ramaz Shengelia Stadium; Referee: G.Kruashvili

29 October 2023 31	Gagra	1–2	Torpedo	Tbilisi
18:00	Mamatsashvili 27'	Report	Ninković 48'; Ekongolo 65'	Stadium: Davit Petriashvili Arena; Referee: J.Khorava

3 November 2023 32	Torpedo	0–0	Samgurali	Kutaisi
19:00		Report		Stadium: Ramaz Shengelia Stadium; Referee: K.Giorgadze

10 November 2023 33	Telavi	1–2	Torpedo	Telavi
17:00	Désiré 45+1'	Report	Chichinadze 8'; Sandokhadze 85'	Stadium: Kavkasioni Arena; Referee: A.Aptsiauri

24 November 2023 34	Torpedo	2–2	Dinamo Tbilisi	Kutaisi
19:00	Shergelashvili 39'; Arabidze 58'	Report	Marusić 80'; Odisharia 90+2'	Stadium: Ramaz Shengelia Stadium; Referee: G.Kruashvili

28 November 2023 35	Torpedo	9–0	Shukura	Kutaisi
14:00	Bugridze 29'; Ninkovic 35', 63', 67'; Arabidze 58'; Pantsulaia 73', 78'; Imedadze 83', 90'	Report		Stadium: Ramaz Shengelia Stadium; Referee: J.Khorava

2 December 2023 36	Dinamo Batumi	2–2	Torpedo	Batumi
14:00	Sandokhadze 6' (o.g.); Kobakhidze 16'	Report	Arabidze 19'; Shergelashvili 64'	Stadium: Batumi Stadium; Referee: G.Avazashvili

==== League table ====
Pos	Team	Pld	W	D	L	GF	GA	GD	Pts	Qualification or relegation
1	Dinamo Batumi (C)	36	21	11	4	83	41	+42	74	Qualification for the Champions League first qualifying round
2	Dinamo Tbilisi	36	21	8	7	93	49	+44	71	Qualification for the Conference League first qualifying round
3	Torpedo Kutaisi	36	16	12	8	55	37	+18	60	Qualification for the Conference League first qualifying round
4	Dila Gori	36	17	9	10	56	39	+17	60	
5	Samgurali Tsqaltubo	36	16	9	11	53	51	+2	57	

Source: Erovnuli Liga, Soccerway
Rules for classification: 1) Points; 2) Head-to-head points; 3) Head-to-head goal difference; 4) Head-to-head goals scored; 5) Head-to-head away goals scored (only if two teams); 6) Goal difference; 7) Goals scored.
(C) Champions

=== Super Cup ===
30 June 2023 Semifinal	Torpedo Kutaisi	0–0 (5–6 p)	Dinamo Batumi	Kutaisi
17:00		Report		Stadium: Ramaz Shengelia Stadium

4 July 2023 3rd place	Torpedo Kutaisi	0–0 (5–4 p)	Dila	Kutaisi
17:00		Report		Stadium: Ramaz Shengelia Stadium; Referee: J.Khorava

=== Georgian Cup ===
7 September 2023 Round of 16	Spaeri	0–2	Torpedo	Tbilisi
15:30		Report	Pantsulaia 47', 55'	Stadium: Spaeri stadium Referee: A.Nonikashvili

25 October 2023 Quarterfinal	Kolkheti 1913	2–1	Torpedo	Poti
18:00	Kokhreidze 31'; Akhaladze 90+9'	Report	Kharshiladze 51' (o.g.)	Stadium: Fazisi Stadium; Referee: A.Aptsiauri

=== UEFA Europa Conference League ===
==== 1st qualifying round ====
13 July 2023 1st leg	Torpedo (Georgia (country))	2–2	(Bosnia and Herzegovina) FK Sarajevo	Kutaisi
21:00 (UTC+4)	Sandokhadze 44'; Bugridze 48'	Report	Oliveira 47'; Varesanović 52'	Stadium: Ramaz Shengelia Stadium; Referee: Snir Levy (Israel)

20 July 2023 2nd leg	(Bosnia and Herzegovina) FK Sarajevo	1–1 (2–4 p)	Torpedo (Georgia (country))	Sarajevo, Bosnia and Herzegovina
23:00 (UTC+4)	Ziljkić 12'	Report	Gigauri 90+1'	Stadium: Olimpijski stadion Referee: Ion Orlic (Moldova)
	Penalties
	(penalty missed) Ikić; (penalty scored) Čataković; (penalty scored) Avramovski; (penalty missed) Beganović		(penalty scored) Caballero; (penalty scored) Shergelashvili; (penalty scored) Manjgaladze; (penalty scored) Kobuladze

==== 2nd qualifying round ====
27 July 2023 1st leg	Torpedo (Georgia (country))	1–4	(Kazakhstan) Aktobe	Kutaisi
21:00 (UTC+4)	Arabidze 89'	Report	Kassym 34' (pen.); Paićković 43'; Samorodov 73'; Filipović 90'	Stadium: Ramaz Shengelia Stadium; Referee: Florian Lemaire (Belgium)

3 August 2023 2nd leg	(Kazakhstan) Aktobe	1–2	Torpedo (Georgia (country))	Aktobe, Kazakhstan
20:00 (UTC+4)	Samorodov 31'	Report	Arabidze 58'; Bugridze 66'	Stadium: Aktobe Ortalyk Stadion; Referee: Trustin Farrugia Cann (Malta)

== Statistics ==
=== Goalscorers ===
Place	Position	Nation	Number	Name	Erovnuli Liga	Georgian Cup	Super Cup	UEFA Europa Conference League	Total
1	FW	(Georgia (country))	8	Giorgi Arabidze	14	–	–	2	16
2	MF	(Georgia (country))	20	Irakli Bugridze	8	–	–	2	10
3	FW	(Serbia)	10	Nikola Ninković	5	–	–	–	5
3	DF	(Georgia (country))	27	Lasha Shergelashvili	5	–	–	–	5
3	FW	(Georgia (country))	14	Giorgi Pantsulaia	3	2	–	–	5
6	FW	(Georgia (country))	14	Nika Kacharava	3	–	–	–	3
7	FW	(Georgia (country))	39	Mauro Caballero	2	–	–	–	2
7	FW	(Cameroon)	9	Francois Ekongolo	2	–	–	–	2
7	FW	(Georgia (country))	35	Davit Imedadze	2	–	–	–	2
7	MF	(Georgia (country))	10	Giorgi Kukhianidze	2	–	–	–	2
7	DF	(Georgia (country))	16	Nika Sandokhadze	1	–	–	1	2
12	DF	(Georgia (country))	4	Anri Chichinadze	1	–	–	–	1
12	DF	(Brazil)	38	Kayke David	1	–	–	–	1
12	MF	(Georgia (country))	7	Merab Gigauri	0	–	–	1	1
12	DF	(Georgia (country))	15	Giorgi Kobuladze	1	–	–	–	1
12	MF	(Georgia (country))	13	Giuli Manjgaladze	1	–	–	–	1
12	DF	(Portugal)	3	Pedro Monteiro	1	–	–	–	1
12	MF	(Georgia (country))	5	Tsotne Nadaraia	1	–	–	–	1
Own goal					2	1	–	–	3
TOTAL					55	3	–	6	64

=== Clean sheets ===
Place	Position	Nation	Number	Name	Erovnuli Liga	Georgian Cup	Super Cup	UEFA Europa Conference League	Total
1	GK	(Serbia)	31	Filip Kljajic	6	–	2	0	8
2	GK	(Georgia (country))	1	Oto Goshadze	6	1	–	–	7
3	GK	(Georgia (country))	30	Roin Kvaskhvadze	4	–	–	–	4
TOTAL					16	1	2	0	19

=== Red cards ===
Position	Nation	Number	Name	Erovnuli Liga	Georgian Cup	Super Cup	UEFA Europa Conference League	Total
DF	(Georgia (country))	22	Giorgi Mchedlishvili	2	0	0	0	2
DF	(Georgia (country))	27	Lasha Shergelashvili	0	1	0	0	1
MF	(Georgia (country))	7	Merab Gigauri	1	0	0	0	1
DF	(Georgia (country))	16	Nika Sandokhadze	0	0	0	1	1
TOTAL				3	1	0	1	5

== Awards ==
At the end of this season, the Erovnuli Liga named Giorgi Arabidze as midfielder of the year and included him and Lasha Shergelashvili in Team of the Year at its annual ceremony.

Several members of Torpedo were also recognized during the season.

Date	Nationality	Winner	Award
1st quarter of the Year	(Portugal)	Pedro Monteiro	Team of the 1st quarter
1st quarter of the Year	(Georgia (country))	Roin Kvaskhvadze	Team of the 1st quarter
3rd quarter of the Year	(Georgia (country))	Giorgi Arabidze	Team of the 3rd quarter
3rd quarter of the Year	(Georgia (country))	Lasha Shergelashvili	Team of the 3rd quarter
4th quarter of the Year	(Serbia)	Filip Kljajic	Team of the 4th quarter
4th quarter of the Year	(Georgia (country))	Lasha Shergelashvili	Team of the 4th quarter
4th quarter of the Year	(Georgia (country))	Nika Sandokhadze	Team of the 4th quarter
4th quarter of the Year	(Georgia (country))	Merab Gigauri	Team of the 4th quarter
4th quarter of the Year	(Georgia (country))	Giorgi Arabidze	Team of the 4th quarter
4th quarter of the Year	(Scotland)	Steve Kean	Manager of the 4th quarter
