= Tsotne Nadaraia =

Georgian footballer (born 1997)

Personal information
- Date of birth: 21 February 1997 (age 29)
- Place of birth: Georgia
- Height: 1.73 m (5 ft 8 in)
- Position: Defender

Team information
- Current team: Torpedo Kutaisi
- Number: 5

Youth career
- Saburtalo

Senior career*
Years	Team	Apps	(Gls)
2013–2019	Saburtalo	73	(0)
2019–	Torpedo Kutaisi	162	(3)

International career
2013–2014	Georgia U17	6	(0)
2015	Georgia U19	3	(0)
2017–2018	Georgia U21	5	(0)
- * Club domestic league appearances and goals as of 1 September 2026

Tsotne Nadaraia (Georgian: ცოტნე ნადარაია; born 21 February 1997) is a Georgian football player who currently plays for Torpedo Kutaisi as a defender.

He has played in all national youth teams and won several trophies with Saburtalo and Torpedo, including the national league.

== Career ==
Nadaraia started his professional career at second division club Saburtalo. He made his first appearance in a 1–1 home draw against Betlemi as a substitute on 3 April 2014.

After the team secured promotion to the top division in 2015, Nadaraia spent five more seasons at Saburtalo who claimed the champion's title in 2018. Around the same time, he was regularly called up to national youth teams.

Nadaraia joined Torpedo Kutaisi initially as a loanee in 2019 and has since been a member of the team.

Before the start of Torpedo's home match against Samtredia on 21 November 2021, a ceremony was held to mark Nadaraia's 100th game in the Erovnuli Liga.

Nadaraia contributed with three appearances to Torpedo's victorious cup campaign in 2022.

== Career statistics ==
=== Club ===
As of match played 6 December 2025

Club statistics
Club	Season	League			Cup		Continental		Other		Total	
Club	Season	Division	Apps	Goals	Apps	Goals	Apps	Goals	Apps	Goals	Apps	Goals
Saburtalo	2013/14	Pirveli Liga	6	0	–		–		–		6	1
Saburtalo	2014/15	Pirveli Liga	22	0	–		–		–		22	0
Saburtalo	2015/16	Umaglesi/ ErovnuliLiga	9	0	2	0	2 (Note: Appearances in UEFA Youth League)	0	–		11	1
Saburtalo	2016	Umaglesi/ ErovnuliLiga	5	0	1	0	–		–		6	0
Saburtalo	2017	Umaglesi/ ErovnuliLiga	13	0	–		–		–		13	0
Saburtalo	2018	Umaglesi/ ErovnuliLiga	14	0	1	0	–		–		15	0
Saburtalo	2019	Umaglesi/ ErovnuliLiga	4	0	–		–		–		4	0
Saburtalo	Total		73	0	4	0	2	0	0	0	79	0
Torpedo Kutaisi	2019	Erovnuli Liga	12	0	1	0	2 (Note: Appearances in 2019–20 UEFA Europa League qualifiers)	0	–		15	0
Torpedo Kutaisi	2020	Erovnuli Liga	16	0	2	0	–		2 (Note: Appearances in Erovnuli Liga playoffs)	1	20	1
Torpedo Kutaisi	2021	Erovnuli Liga	29	0	1	0	–		2	0	32	0
Torpedo Kutaisi	2022	Erovnuli Liga	25	1	3	0	–		–		28	1
Torpedo Kutaisi	2023	Erovnuli Liga	18	1	1	0	4 (Note: 2023–24 UEFA Europa Conference League qualifiers)	0	2 (Note: Appearances in Georgian Super Cup)	0	25	1
Torpedo Kutaisi	2024	Erovnuli Liga	30	0	1	0	4 (Note: 2024–25 UEFA Conference League qualifiers)	0	2	0	37	0
Torpedo Kutaisi	2025	Erovnuli Liga	19	0	0	0	4 (Note: Appearances in UEFA Conference League qualifiers)	0	2 (Note: Appearances in Georgian Super Cup)	0	25	0
Torpedo Kutaisi	Total		149	2	9	0	14	0	10	1	182	3
Career total			222	2	13	0	16	0	10	1	261	3

== Honours ==
Torpedo Kutaisi

- Erovnuli Liga (1): 2018
- Georgian Cup (1): 2022
- Georgian Super Cup (2): 2019, 2024
