= Giorgi Mchedlishvili =

Georgian footballer

Personal information
- Full name: Giorgi Mchedlishvili Jr
- Date of birth: 18 January 1992 (age 34)
- Place of birth: Georgia
- Position: Defender

Team information
- Current team: Samtredia
- Number: 22

Senior career*
Years	Team	Apps	(Gls)
-2012	Locomotive	18	(0)
2012–2013	Merani Martvili	10	(0)
2013–2014	WIT Georgia	36	(0)
2014	Dinamo Tbilisi	6	(0)
2015	Guria	14	(1)
2015–2017	Samtredia	69	(3)
2018–2019	HNK Gorica	32	(0)
2019–2022	FK Ventspils	31	(0)
2021	Samgurali	10	(0)
2021–2022	Samtredia	29	(0)
2022–2024	Torpedo Kutaisi	63	(0)
2025–	Samtredia	40	(0)
- * Club domestic league appearances and goals as of 11 July 2026

Giorgi Mchedlishvili (Georgian: გიორგი მჭედლიშვილი; born 18 January 1992) is a Georgian professional footballer who plays for Erovnuli Liga 2 club Samtredia. Being the winner of Georgia's top division, he has also won the national cup twice and the Super Cup three times.

== Career ==
Mchedlishvili started his senior career with Locomotive Tbilisi. Merani Martvili became the first top-league club he joined in 2012. Two year later Mchedlishvili spent a half season at Dinamo Tbilisi. As he moved to Guria in the winter break, Mchedlishvili scored his first league goal against his former club in a 2–2 draw on 17 May 2015.

In the same year, the player signed for ascending club Samtredia where he won the first titles of his career, the national league and the Super Cup.

In 2018, Mchedlishvili signed for Croatian 2nd division club HNK Gorica. After one season Gorica were promoted with Mchdelishvili making twenty-two league appearances in the domestic top league.

After a further two-year tenure at Virsliga club Ventspils, Mchedlishvili returned to Georgia in 2021. Initially, he joined Samgurali but citing the lack of sufficient playing time he shortly left back for Samtredia.

In June 2022, Mchedlishvili moved to Torpedo Kutaisi. During the next three seasons, he added the cup and Super cup titles to his tally.

In early February 2025, Mchedlishvili returned to Samtredia again.

== Statistics ==
As of match played 23 June 2026

Appearances and goals by club, season and competition
Club	Season	League			National cup		Continental		Other		Total	
Club	Season	Division	Apps	Goals	Apps	Goals	Apps	Goals	Apps	Goals	Apps	Goals
Locomotive	2011–12	Pirveli Liga	18	0	2	1	–		–		20	1
Merani Martvili	2012–13	Umaglesi Liga	10	0	2	0	–		–		12	0
WIT Georgia	2013–14	Umaglesi Liga	7	0	1	0	–		–		8	0
WIT Georgia	2014–15	Umaglesi Liga	29	0	2	0	–		–		31	2
WIT Georgia	Total		36	0	3	0	0	0	0	0	39	0
Dinamo Tbilisi	2014–15	Umaglesi Liga	6	0	1	0	–		–		7	0
Guria	2014–15	Umaglesi Liga	14	1	–		–		–		14	1
Samtredia	2015–16	Umaglesi Liga	25	0	6	0	–		–		31	12
Samtredia	2016	Umaglesi Liga	11	0	1	0	2 (Note: Appearances in UEFA Europa League qualifiers)	0	1 (Note: Appearances in Georgian Super Cup)	0	15	0
Samtredia	2017	Erovnuli Liga	33	3	2	0	2 (Note: Appearances in UEFA Champions League qualifiers)	0	–		37	3
Gorica	2017–18	2nd Football League	10	0	–		–		–		10	0
Gorica	2018–19	1st Football League	22	0	–		–		–		22	0
Gorica	Total		32	0	0	0	0	0	0	0	32	0
Ventspils	2019	Virsliga	9	0	–		6	0	–		15	0
Ventspils	2020	Virsliga	22	0	3	0	2	0	–		27	0
Ventspils	Total		31	0	3	0	8	0	1	0	42	0
Samgurali	2021	Erovnuli Liga	10	0	1	0	–		–		11	0
Samtredia	2021	Erovnuli Liga	16	0	–		–		–		16	0
Samtredia	2022	Erovnuli Liga 2	13	0	–		–		–		13	0
Torpedo Kutaisi	2022	Erovnuli Liga	13	0	2	0	–		–		15	0
Torpedo Kutaisi	2023	Erovnuli Liga	24	0	1	0	–		2	0	27	0
Torpedo Kutaisi	2024	Erovnuli Liga	26	0	1	0	3	0	2	0	32	0
Torpedo Kutaisi	Total		63	0	4	0	3	0	4	0	74	0
Samtredia	2025	Erovnuli Liga 2	23	0	2	0	–		–		25	0
Samtredia	2026	Erovnuli Liga 2	17	0	0	0	–		–		17	0
Samtredia	Total		138	3	12	0	4	0	1	0	153	3
Career total			358	4	27	1	15	0	5	0	403	5

== Honours ==
Torpedo Kutaisi

- Georgian Cup: 2022
- Georgian Super Cup: 2024

Samtredia

- Erovnuli Liga: 2016
- Georgian Super Cup: 2017

Dinamo Tbilisi

- Erovnuli Liga: 2013–14
- Georgian Cup:2013–14
- Georgian Super Cup: 2014
