= Filip Kljajić (footballer) =

Serbian footballer (born 1990)

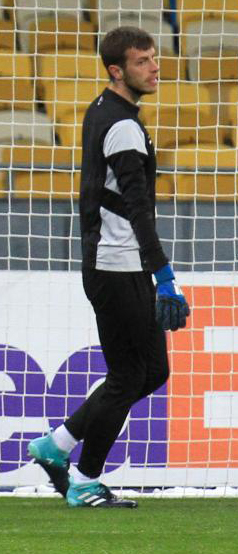
- Kljajić with Partizan in 2017

Personal information
- Date of birth: 16 August 1990 (age 36)
- Place of birth: Belgrade, SFR Yugoslavia
- Height: 1.97 m (6 ft 6 in)
- Position: Goalkeeper

Team information
- Current team: Torpedo Kutaisi
- Number: 31

Youth career
- Obilić
- Sinđelić Beograd
- 2002–2008: Red Star Belgrade

Senior career*
Years	Team	Apps	(Gls)
2008–2009	Hajduk Beograd	8	(0)
2009–2010	Šumadija Jagnjilo	41	(0)
2011–2012	Metalac Gornji Milanovac	20	(0)
2012–2013	Rad	38	(0)
2014–2020	Partizan	50	(0)
2014	→ Teleoptik (loan)	12	(0)
2018	→ Platanias (loan)	13	(0)
2020–2021	Omiya Ardija	29	(0)
2022–2023	Novi Pazar	26	(0)
2023–	Torpedo Kutaisi	100	(0)

International career
2016	Serbia	1	(0)
- * Club domestic league appearances and goals as of 1 September 2026

Filip Kljajić (Serbian Cyrillic: Филип Кљајић; born 16 August 1990) is a Serbian professional footballer who plays as a goalkeeper for Torpedo Kutaisi.

== Club career ==
=== Early years ===
Born in Belgrade, Kljajić spent some period in Red Star Belgrade youth categories. He started his senior career with Hajduk Beograd, making 8 appearances in Serbian First League. He was declared as a man of the match 3 times with average rating 7.31. He left for Šumadija Jagnjilo ahead of 2009–10 season. Kljajić played 28 times, with average rating 7.31, and was declared as a man of the match 2 times. He also played for Šumadija in first half of 2010–11 season and made 13 appearances.

=== Metalac Gornji Milanovac ===
Kljajić signed with Metalac for second half of season, and mainly was a reserve for Dejan Bogunović. He was licensed with squad number 9, atypically for goalkeepers. He was in first 11 3 times. On the beginning of season, Kljajić changed his jersey number, and took 12. He shared his position with Živko Živković, but he was selected as a first choice in front of goal 17 times. He was also declared as the best on the field 3 times.

=== Rad ===
After Metalac's relegation from SuperLiga, Kljajić joined Rad. Coach Nikolić included him in first 11 24 times in front of his competitors Branislav Danilović, Aleksandar Jovanović and Boris Radunović. On 10 November 2013, Kljajić saved penalty kick from Dragan Mrđa. For the first half of 2013–14 season Kljajić made 14 appearances, and was declared as a man of the match 1 time. After 2014, he received the contract termination on the detriment of the club.

=== Partizan ===
On 14 February 2014, Kljajić signed a four-year contract with Partizan and took the number 12 shirt. Immediately after, Kljajić was sent on loan to Teleoptik. He played 12 games in the remainder of the 2013–14 season.

Kljajić returned to Partizan at the beginning of new season, as a competitor of Milan Lukač and Živko Živković, his former Metalac teammate. Coach Marko Nikolić, who also trained Kljajić in Rad included him in first 11 in Serbian Cup against Sloga Petrovac. He was in protocol several times, but made no league debut. He has also been on the bench four times, in UEFA Europa League, two times against Beşiktaş, one time against Tottenham Hotspur and Asteras Tripolis. During the season, he was not given a chance beside Milan Lukač and Živko Živković, mainly defended in friendly matches and several times was on the bench. On 1 November 2015, Kljajić made his debut for Partizan in SuperLiga against his former club, Metalac in a 1–0 away defeat. Four days later, he made his debut for the club in Europa League group stage against Athletic Bilbao at San Mamés. Two weeks later, Kljajić made his second cap in Europa League in a 1–2 away victory over AZ. In 2015–16 season Kljajić made 13 appearances in all competitions.

After he succeeded Bojan Šaranov, Kljajić played mostly matches in the 2016–17 season as a first choice goalkeeper. At the beginning of May 2017, Kljajić earned a hand injury and missed the rest of a season. In summer 2017, Kljajić extended his contract with Partizan until 2021. He also started the next season as a first choice, but after the club signed Vladimir Stojković, Kljajić spent the rest of the same year as a back-up pick.

On 30 December 2017, Kljajić moved on six-month loan deal to Platanias, without an option to purchase the contract.

== International career ==
Kljajić made his international debut for the Serbia national football team in a friendly 3-0 loss to Qatar, played on 29 September 2016, under coach Slavoljub Muslin.

== Personal life ==
He is the son of Dušan Kljajić.

== Career statistics ==
=== Club ===
As of 6 December 2025

Appearances and goals by club, season and competition
Club	Season	League			Cup		Continental		Other		Total	
Club	Season	Division	Apps	Goals	Apps	Goals	Apps	Goals	Apps	Goals	Apps	Goals
Hajduk Beograd	2008–09	Serbian First League	8	0	—		—		—		8	0
Šumadija Jagnjilo	2009–10	Serbian League Belgrade	28	0	—		—		—		28	0
Šumadija Jagnjilo	2010–11	Serbian League Belgrade	13	0	—		—		—		13	0
Šumadija Jagnjilo	Total		41	0	—		—		—		41	0
Metalac Gornji Milanovac	2010–11	Serbian SuperLiga	3	0	—		—		—		3	0
Metalac Gornji Milanovac	2011–12	Serbian SuperLiga	17	0	1	0	—		—		18	0
Metalac Gornji Milanovac	Total		20	0	1	0	—		—		21	0
Rad	2012–13	Serbian SuperLiga	24	0	3	0	—		—		27	0
Rad	2013–14	Serbian SuperLiga	14	0	1	0	—		—		15	0
Rad	Total		38	0	4	0	—		—		42	0
Partizan	2014–15	Serbian SuperLiga	0	0	1	0	0	0	—		1	0
Partizan	2015–16	Serbian SuperLiga	9	0	2	0	2	0	—		13	0
Partizan	2016–17	Serbian SuperLiga	27	0	3	0	0	0	—		30	0
Partizan	2017–18	Serbian SuperLiga	4	0	0	0	4	0	—		8	0
Partizan	2018–19	Serbian SuperLiga	8	0	1	0	1	0	—		10	0
Partizan	2019–20	Serbian SuperLiga	2	0	0	0	1	0	—		3	0
Partizan	Total		50	0	7	0	8	0	—		65	0
Teleoptik (loan)	2013–14	Serbian First League	12	0	0	0	—		—		12	0
Platanias (loan)	2017–18	Super League Greece	13	0	0	0	—		—		13	0
Omiya Ardija	2020	J2 League	22	0	0	0	—		—		22	0
Omiya Ardija	2021	J2 League	7	0	0	0	—		—		7	0
Omiya Ardija	Total		29	0	0	0	—		—		29	0
Novi Pazar	2022–23	Serbian SuperLiga	26	0	2	0	—		—		28	0
Torpedo Kutaisi	2023	Erovnuli Liga	15	0	0	0	4 (Note: Appearances in UEFA Europa Conference League)	0	1 (Note: Appearances in Georgian Super Cup)	0	20	0
Torpedo Kutaisi	2024	Erovnuli Liga	31	0	0	0	4	0	2	0	37	0
Torpedo Kutaisi	2025	Erovnuli Liga	36	0	0	0	0	0	0	0	36	0
Torpedo Kutaisi	Total		82	0	0	0	8	0	3	0	93	0
Career total			319	0	14	0	16	0	3	0	352	0

=== International ===
As of 29 September 2016

Serbia
Year	Apps	Goals
2016	1	0
Total	1	0

== Honours ==
Partizan

- Serbian SuperLiga: 2014–15, 2016–17
- Serbian Cup: 2015–16, 2016–17, 2018–19

Torpedo Kutaisi

- Georgian Super Cup: 2024
