= Rahmat Akbari =

Afghani footballer (born 2000)

Personal information
- Date of birth: 20 June 2000 (age 26)
- Place of birth: Jaghori, Afghanistan
- Height: 1.85 m (6 ft 1 in)
- Positions: Attacking midfielder; winger

Team information
- Current team: Gold Coast Knights
- Number: 14

Youth career
- Logan Lightning
- Brisbane Strikers
- 2015–2016: QAS NTC
- 2017–2018: Brisbane Roar

Senior career*
Years	Team	Apps	(Gls)
2017–2020	Brisbane Roar NPL	46	(9)
2017–2023	Brisbane Roar	82	(2)
2018–2019	→ Melbourne Victory (loan)	9	(0)
2018–2019	→ Melbourne Victory NPL (loan)	9	(3)
2023–2024	Torpedo Kutaisi	24	(0)
2025–	Gold Coast Knights		

International career^{‡}
2015	Australia U17	15	(6)
2023–	Afghanistan	10	(1)
Medal record
Men's football
Representing Australia
AFF U-16 Youth Championship
First place	2016 Cambodia	U-17 Team
Third place	2015 Cambodia	U-17 Team
- * Club domestic league appearances and goals as of 2 June 2024 ‡ National team caps and goals as of 21 March 2025

Rahmat Akbari (Dari: رحمت اکبری; born 20 June 2000) is an Afghan professional footballer who plays as a central midfielder for Queensland National Premier Leagues side Gold Coast Knights and the Afghanistan national football team.

== Club career ==
=== Brisbane Roar ===
On 6 October 2017, Akbari made his professional debut in the opening round of the 2017–18 season, replacing Nicholas D'Agostino in the 83rd minute as Brisbane Roar were beaten 2–0 by Melbourne City at AAMI Park.

=== Melbourne Victory ===
Akbari joined Melbourne Victory on a one-year loan in October 2018. He made his Victory debut on 11 November 2018, replacing James Troisi in the 89th minute as they demolished the Central Coast Mariners 4–1 at home.

=== Return to Brisbane Roar ===
On 4 June 2019, it was announced that Akbari had returned to Brisbane following the completion of his contract.

=== Torpedo Kutaisi ===
On 28 June 2023, Georgian top-flight club Torpedo Kutaisi announced it had signed Akbari on a 1.5-year contract.

=== Gold Coast Knights ===
National Premier Leagues Queensland side Gold Coast Knights announced Akbari's signing on February 14, 2025.

== International career ==
Due to his Afghan heritage, Akbari is available to represent Afghanistan national football team. On 7 March 2022, he reportedly accepted a call-up for Afghanistan to play in two hybrid friendly matches.

Akbari was called up to the Afghan side to play Bangladesh in Dhaka in September 2023. He made his debut in their 1–1 draw against Bangladesh at the Bashundhara Kings Arena on 7 September.

== Personal life ==
Born in Jaghori, Afghanistan to an ethnic Hazara family, Akbari was raised in Pakistan for the first five years of his life, before his family migrated to south-east Queensland as refugees in 2005. Coming to Australia and playing football with his brothers at the local park. He ended up discovering football at the age of 8. This is where he first played for Beenleigh Lions. He eventually moved onto Logan Lightning and he played with them for several years before joining the Brisbane Strikers

== Career statistics ==
As of match played 15 May 2024

- Note - also played for the Brisbane Roar NPL side in 2017 and 2018 seasons however the statistics can no longer be found on the competition website.

Appearances and goals by club, season and competition
Club	Season	League			Cup		Continental		Total	
Club	Season	Division	Apps	Goals	Apps	Goals	Apps	Goals	Apps	Goals
Brisbane Roar NPL	2019	NPL Queensland	4	0	—		—		10000	0
Brisbane Roar NPL	2020	NPL Queensland	6	0	—		—		6	0
Brisbane Roar NPL	Total		10	0	—		—		10	0
Brisbane Roar	2017–18	A-League	6	0	0	0	0	0	6	0
Brisbane Roar	2019–20	A-League	5	0	2	0	—		7	0
Brisbane Roar	2020–21	A-League	26	0	—		—		26	0
Brisbane Roar	2021–22	A-League	23	2	2	0	–		25	2
Brisbane Roar	2022–23	A-League	22	0	5	1	—		27	1
Brisbane Roar	Total		82	2	9	1	0	0	91	3
Melbourne Victory (loan)	2018–19	A-League	9	0	0	0	2 (Note: Appearances in AFC Champions League)	0	11	0
Torpedo Kutaisi	2023	Erovnuli Liga	11	0	1	0	—		12	0
Torpedo Kutaisi	2024	Erovnuli Liga	13	0	0	0	0	0	13	0
Torpedo Kutaisi	Total		24	0	1	0	0	0	25	0
Career total			125	2	10	1	2	0	137	3

=== International goals ===
No.	Date	Venue	Opponent	Score	Result	Competition
1.	26 March 2024	Indira Gandhi Athletic Stadium, Guwahati, India	India	1–1	2–1	2026 FIFA World Cup qualification

== Honours ==
Australia U17

- AFF U-16 Youth Championship: 2016
- Torpedo Kutaisi
- Georgian Super Cup: 2024
