= Lasha Shergelashvili =

Georgian footballer

Personal information
- Full name: Lasha Shergelashvili
- Date of birth: 17 January 1992 (age 34)
- Place of birth: Tbilisi, Georgia
- Height: 1.69 m (5 ft 6 1/2 in)
- Positions: Left back; left winger

Team information
- Current team: Samgurali
- Number: 27

Senior career*
Years	Team	Apps	(Gls)
2011–2013	Torpedo Kutaisi	12	(3)
2013–2014	Dinamo Tbilisi II	14	(3)
2014–2015	Dinamo Tbilisi	27	(2)
2015–2017	Samtredia	42	(6)
2017–2019	RFS	19	(2)
2019–2020	PAS Giannina	11	(0)
2020	Dinamo Batumi	5	(0)
2021	Telavi	34	(5)
2022–2024	Torpedo Kutaisi	80	(9)
2025–	Samgurali	51	(6)

International career^{‡}
2017–2019	Georgia	7	(0)
- * Club domestic league appearances and goals as of 10 July 2026 ‡ National team caps and goals as of 17:48, 29 April 2019 (UTC)

Lasha Shergelashvili (Georgian: ლაშა შერგელაშვილი, romanized: lasha shergelashvili, pronounced [laʃa ʃeɾɡelaʃʷili]; born 17 January 1992) is a Georgian professional footballer who plays for Samgurali as a left back.

Known mostly for long-distance free kick goals, he has won all three domestic competitions with different teams.

== Club career ==
Shergelashvili started his professional career with Torpedo Kutaisi before moving to Dinamo Tbilisi. In 2015, he lifted his first Georgian Cup trophy, having contributed with four appearances during the campaign.

The next year Shergelashvili secured the champion's title with Samtredia.

In January 2017, the player signed his first contract with a foreign club, Latvian side RFS. Two years later, he moved to Super League Greece club PAS Giannina.

Following a short-term tenure at Dinamo Batumi, In January 2021, Shergelashvili joined Telavi on a year-long deal.

He spent the next three seasons with Torpedo, becoming the cup and supercup winner. Individually, twice in a row he was named in Team of the Year.

In December 2024, fellow Imeretian club Samgurali announced the signing of Shergelashvili.

== International career ==
Shergelashvili made his debut for the Georgia national football team on 23 January 2017 in a friendly against Uzbekistan.

== Honours ==
=== Team ===
Torpedo Kutaisi

- Georgian Cup: 2022
- Georgian Super Cup: 2024

Samtredia

- Georgian League: 2016

Dinamo Tbilisi

- Georgian Cup: 2014-15
- Georgian Super Cup: 2015

PAS Giannina

- Super League Greece 2: 2019–20

=== Individual ===
- Team of the Season: 2023, 2024
