= Auro Jr. =

Brazilian footballer (born 1996)

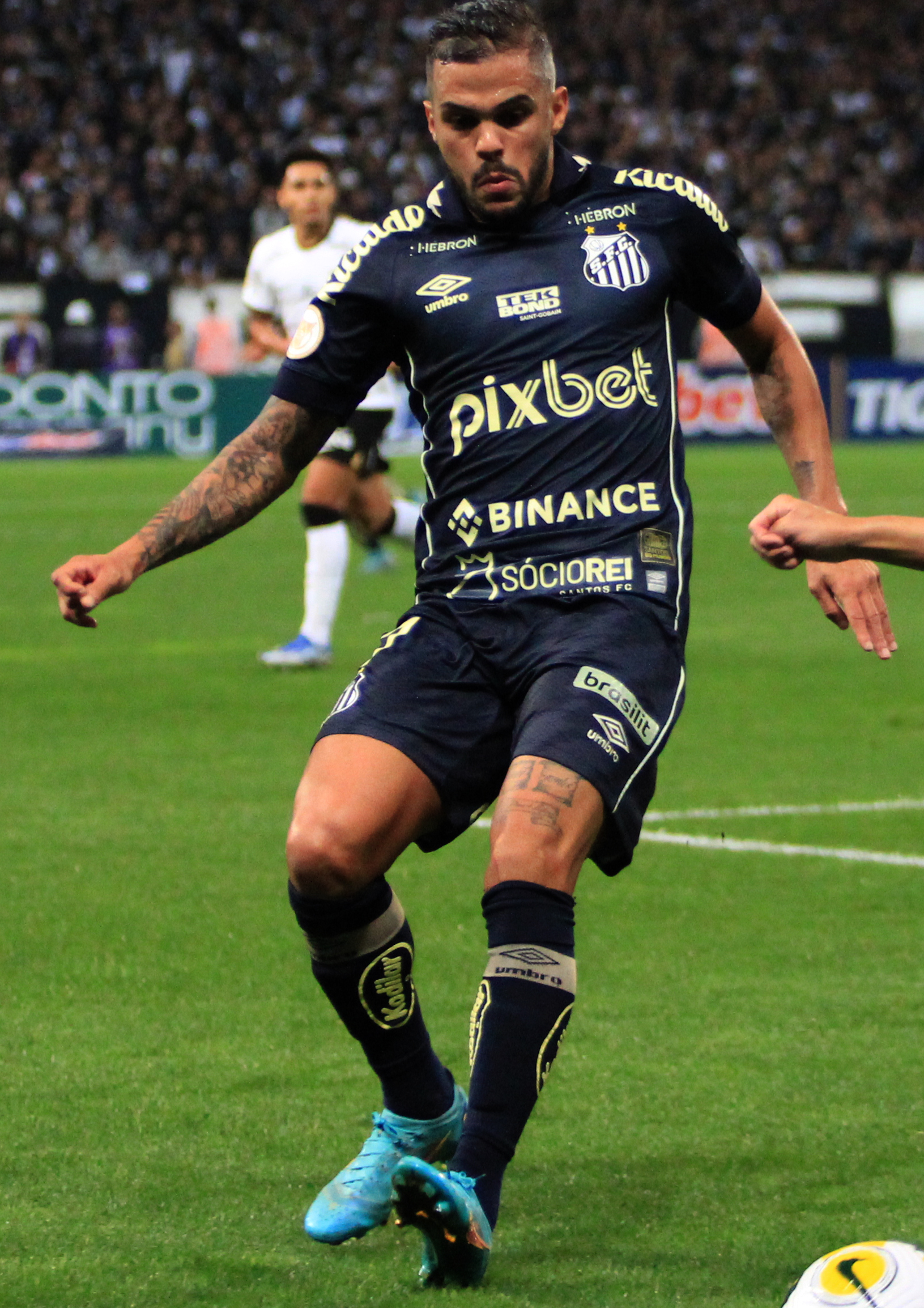
- Auro with Santos in 2022

Personal information
- Full name: Auro Alvaro da Cruz Júnior
- Date of birth: 23 January 1996 (age 30)
- Place of birth: Jaú, Brazil
- Height: 1.68 m (5 ft 6 in)
- Position: Right-back

Team information
- Current team: Tombense

Youth career
- 2010–2016: São Paulo

Senior career*
Years	Team	Apps	(Gls)
2014–2018	São Paulo	34	(0)
2016	→ Linense (loan)	1	(0)
2017	→ América Mineiro (loan)	11	(0)
2018	→ Toronto FC (loan)	18	(0)
2019–2022	Toronto FC	66	(0)
2022	→ Santos (loan)	11	(0)
2023	Ordabasy	20	(1)
2024	Torpedo Kutaisi	19	(0)
2025	Al-Muharraq		
2026–	Tombense	4	(0)

International career
2013	Brazil U17	14	(0)
2015	Brazil U20	3	(0)
2014	Brazil U21	1	(0)
- * Club domestic league appearances and goals as of 20 February 2026

Auro Alvaro da Cruz Júnior (born 23 January 1996), known as Auro Jr. or just Auro, is a Brazilian professional footballer who plays as a right-back for Tombense.

== Club career ==
=== Brazil ===
Born in Jaú, São Paulo, Auro joined São Paulo FC's youth setup in 2010, aged 14. He made his first team – and Série A – debut on 7 September 2014, coming on as a first-half substitute for injured Paulo Miranda in a 2–0 home win over Sport Recife. He was handed his first start three days later, in a 4–2 success at Botafogo.

On 23 September 2014, Auro renewed his contract with the Tricolor until 2019. A regular starter under manager Muricy Ramalho, he lost his starting spot after the arrival of Bruno.

In February 2016, Auro signed on loan with Linense for the 2016 Campeonato Paulista. In June, after featuring in only eight minutes for Linense, he was set to join Sport Recife on loan (including being introduced by the club as a new signing), however, he was prevented from joining the club due to a Brazilian rule that prevents a player from representing three clubs during the same year, as he had already made appearances for Linense and São Paulo in 2016. Instead, he returned to São Paulo, where he mainly featured with the under-20 squad, winning two under-20 titles that season.

On 14 January 2017, Auro joined América Mineiro on loan, making a total of 16 appearances between Primeira Liga, Campeonato Mineiro, and Copa do Brasil. He started off well with América, but suffered a knee injury, requiring him to miss time due to an operation. He subsequently returned to São Paulo in 2018, after his loan spell had ended.

=== Canada ===
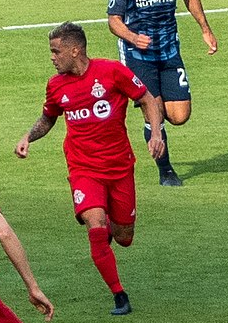
Auro Jr. playing for Toronto FC in 2020

On 13 February 2018, it was announced that Auro Jr. had been signed on loan by Major League Soccer club Toronto FC with an option to buy. He made the decision to come to Toronto after speaking to his São Paulo teammate and former Toronto FC striker Gilberto, turning down opportunities to play in South America, Portugal and Spain (including with La Liga club CD Leganés) in favour of joining Toronto. He made his club debut on 20 February 2018, in a 2–0 away win against the Colorado Rapids in the first leg of their round of 16 CONCACAF Champions League tie. He recorded his first assist on May 18, on Ryan Telfer's game-winning goal against Orlando City SC. In his debut season with the club, Auro made 28 appearances across all competitions, registering five assists.

On 17 December 2018, Toronto opted to purchase Auro Jr. permanently from São Paulo. In 2019, he was determined to be the best right-back in the league according to Opta advanced statistics. He scored his first goal in a pre-season exhibition match on 1 April 2021, from a penalty kick, against Columbus Crew SC. At the end of the 2021 MLS season, Toronto announced they were exercising their contract option on Auro, keeping him at the club through 2022.

==== Loan to Santos ====
On 14 February 2022, Santos announced the signing of Auro on a one-year loan deal with an option to purchase. He made his debut for the club on 8 March, replacing Vinicius Balieiro at half-time in a 1–1 Copa do Brasil away draw against Fluminense-PI, with his side advancing on penalties. On 22 November 2022, Santos announced that Auro would leave the club at the end of his contract. Toronto also declined his contract option for 2023, making him a free agent.

=== Asia ===
On 3 March 2023, Auro was announced at Kazakhstan Premier League club Ordabasy.

In April 2024, Auro signed a one-year contract with an option for an additional season with Georgian club Torpedo Kutaisi in the Erovnuli Liga.

In January 2025, he joined Al-Muharraq in the Bahraini Premier League.

=== Return to Brazil ===
In December 2025, Auro returned to Brazil to sign for Tombense in the Brazilian Serie D and Campeonato Mineiro for 2026.

== International career ==
At international level, Auro has represented Brazil at U-17, U-20, and U-21 level. He earned his first callup to play in the 2013 South American U-17 Championship, playing in all nine of his team's matches, en route to a third-place finish. At the 2013 FIFA U-17 World Cup, in the quarter-finals against Mexico, he scored his team's tenth penalty kick during the shootout which they lost 11–10, after the game ended 1–1 after extra time. He was called up for the U-21 squad at the 2014 Toulon Tournament, where he was part of the championship winning team. He was called up to the U-20 team for the 2015 South American U-20 Championship, playing in three matches.

== Style of play ==
A versatile defender, Auro is usually deployed as a right-back, but is capable of playing on either flank. Regarding Auro Jr.'s playing style, Tim Bezbatchenko – Toronto FC's senior vice-president of soccer operations and general manager – said in 2018 that he is "...a very capable two-way player and an important part of our team. Auro Jr. is an attacking threat on the wing who also puts in solid defensive work."

== Career statistics ==
As of 8 December 2024

Appearances and goals by club, season and competition
Club	Season	League			State league		Cup		Continental		Other		Total	
Club	Season	Division	Apps	Goals	Apps	Goals	Apps	Goals	Apps	Goals	Apps	Goals	Apps	Goals
São Paulo	2014	Série A	12	0	0	0	0	0	2 (Note: Appearance(s) in Copa Sudamericana)	0	—		14	0
São Paulo	2015	Série A	10	0	6 (Note: Appearance(s) in Campeonato Paulista)	0	0	0	0	0	—		16	0
São Paulo	2016	Série A	6	0	—		0	0	0	0	—		6	0
São Paulo	Total		28	0	6	0	0	0	2	0	—		36	0
Linense (loan)	2016	Série D	0	0	1	0	1	0	—		—		2	0
América Mineiro (loan)	2017	Série B	0	0	11 (Note: Appearance(s) in Campeonato Mineiro)	0	2	0	—		3 (Note: Appearance(s) in Primeira Liga (Brazil))	0	16	0
Toronto FC (loan)	2018	MLS	18	0	—		1	0	8 (Note: Appearance(s) in CONCACAF Champions League)	0	1 (Note: Appearance in Campeones Cup)	0	28	0
Toronto FC	2019	MLS	23	0	—		1	0	2	0	4 (Note: Appearance(s) in MLS Cup Playoffs)	0	30	0
Toronto FC	2020	MLS	18 (Note: Includes three appearances in MLS is Back Tournament group stage)	0	—		0	0	—		2 (Note: One appearance in MLS is Back Tournament knockout stage, one appearance in MLS Cup Playoffs)	0	20	0
Toronto FC	2021	MLS	25	0	—		2	0	4	0	—		31	0
Toronto FC	Total		84	0	—		4	0	14	0	7	0	109	0
Santos (loan)	2022	Série A	8	0	3	0	1	0	3	0	—		15	0
Ordabasy	2023	Kazakhstan Premier League	20	1	—		5	0	2	0	—		27	0
Torpedo Kutaisi	2024	Erovnuli Liga	19	0	—		2 (Note: Appearances in UEFA Conference League qualifiers)	0	2 (Note: Appearances in Georgian Super Cup)	0	—		23	0
Career total			159	1	21	0	13	0	23	0	12	0	228	0

== Honours ==
=== Club ===
São Paulo

- Série A runner-up: 2014

Toronto FC

- MLS Cup runner-up: 2019
- Canadian Championship: 2018; runner-up: 2019
- CONCACAF Champions League runner-up: 2018

Torpedo Kutaisi

- Georgian Super Cup: 2024

=== International ===
Brazil U-21

- Toulon Tournament: 2014
