= Éliton Júnior =

Brazilian footballer (born 1998)

Personal information
- Full name: Éliton Pardinho Toreta Júnior
- Date of birth: 26 January 1998 (age 28)
- Place of birth: São Mateus, Brazil
- Height: 1.81 m (5 ft 11 in)
- Position: Central midfielder

Team information
- Current team: Forca Kochi FC
- Number: 10

Youth career
- Fragata
- Flamengo
- Náutico

Senior career*
Years	Team	Apps	(Gls)
2018–2019	Lokomotiv Plovdiv	34	(1)
2020–2021	Red Bull Brasil	18	(2)
2022–2023	Varbergs BoIS	36	(4)
2023	→ KuPS	9	(2)
2024	Torpedo Kutaisi	26	(3)
2025	Amazonas	5	(0)
2025	Tirana	10	(2)
- * Club domestic league appearances and goals

Éliton Pardinho Toreta Júnior (born 26 January 1998), commonly known as Éliton Júnior, is a Brazilian professional footballer who plays as a midfielder.

== Career ==
Born in São Mateus, Espírito Santo, Éliton had a nomadic youth career with spells at Fragata, Flamengo and Náutico before he joined Bulgarian club Lokomotiv Plovdiv at the age of 20 in February 2018.

Eliton made his debut for the senior team on 25 February 2018 in a 1–1 draw away to Slavia Sofia, replacing Dimo Bakalov.

On 14 January 2022, Eliton signed a four-year contract with Varberg in Sweden.

After a short loan stint with Kuopion Palloseura (KuPS) in Veikkausliiga, Eliton Junior terminated his contract with Varbergs BoIS on mutual decision in January 2024, and signed with Georgian club Torpedo Kutaisi.

== Career statistics ==
As of 18 May 2025

Club	Season	Division	League		State League		National cup (Note: Includes Bulgarian Cup, Svenska Cupen, Georgian Cup)		Continental		Other		Total	
Club	Season	Division	Apps	Goals	Apps	Goals	Apps	Goals	Apps	Goals	Apps	Goals	Apps	Goals
Lokomotiv Plovdiv	2017–18	Bulgarian First League	14	0	—		0	0	—		—		14	0
Lokomotiv Plovdiv	2018–19	Bulgarian First League	18	1	—		3	0	—		—		21	1
Lokomotiv Plovdiv	2019–20	Bulgarian First League	2	0	—		0	0	1 (Note: Includes UEFA Europa League)	0	1 (Note: Includes Bulgarian Supercup)	0	4	0
Lokomotiv Plovdiv	Total		34	1	3	0	0	0	0	0	0	0	37	1
Red Bull Brasil	2020		—		2 (Note: Includes Campeonato Paulista Série A3)	0	—		—		—		2	0
Red Bull Brasil	2021		—		16	2	—		—		—		16	2
Red Bull Brasil	Total		–	–	18	2	–	–	–	–	–	–	18	2
Varbergs BoIS	2022	Allsvenskan	20	1	—		1	0	—		—		21	1
Varbergs BoIS	2023	Allsvenskan	16	3	—		3	1	—		—		19	4
Varbergs BoIS	Total		36	4	4	1	–	–	–	–	–	–	40	5
KuPS (loan)	2023	Veikkausliiga	9	2	—		—		—		—		9	2
Torpedo Kutaisi	2024	Erovnuli Liga	26	3	—		0	0	4 (Note: Includes UEFA Conference League)	0	1 (Note: Includes Georgian Super Cup)	1	31	4
Amazonas	2025	Série B	5	0	0	0	0	0	–		2 (Note: Appearances in Copa Verde)	0	7	0
Career total			110	10	18	2	7	1	5	0	4	1	143	14

== Honours ==
Lokomotiv Plovdiv

- Bulgarian Cup: 2018–19

KuPS

- Veikkausliiga runner-up: 2023

Torpedo Kutaisi

- Georgian Super Cup: 2024
