= Anri Chichinadze =

Georgian footballer (born 1997)

Personal information
- Date of birth: 5 October 1998 (age 28)
- Place of birth: Kutaisi, Georgia
- Height: 1.89 m (6 ft 2 in)
- Position: Centre-back

Team information
- Current team: Navbahor Namangan
- Number: 44

Youth career
- Torpedo Kutaisi

Senior career*
Years	Team	Apps	(Gls)
2015–2019	Torpedo Kutaisi	86	(0)
2020	Saburtalo	12	(0)
2021–2022	Dila Gori	53	(0)
2023	Turon	11	(1)
2023	Torpedo Kutaisi	7	(1)
2024–2025	Chernomorets Novorossiysk	41	(1)
2025	Orenburg	15	(0)
2026–	Navbahor Namangan	4	(1)

International career^{‡}
2016	Georgia U19	3	(0)
2016–2017	Georgia U21	5	(0)
- * Club domestic league appearances and goals as of 18 March 2026 ‡ National team caps and goals as of 12 June 2017

Anri Chichinadze (Georgian: ანრი ჭიჭინაძე; born 5 October 1998) is a Georgian football player who plays as a centre-back for Uzbekistan Super League club Navbahor Namangan.

== Club career ==
On 5 July 2025, Chichinadze signed a contract with Orenburg in Russia. He made his Russian Premier League debut for Orenburg on 21 July 2025 in their season opener against CSKA Moscow, as a starter. His contract with Orenburg was mutually terminated on 8 January 2026.

== Career statistics ==
As of 5 December 2025

Club	Season	League			Cup		Continental		Other		Total	
Club	Season	Division	Apps	Goals	Apps	Goals	Apps	Goals	Apps	Goals	Apps	Goals
Torpedo Kutaisi	2015–16	Erovnuli Liga	20	0	3	1	–		–		23	1
Torpedo Kutaisi	2016	Erovnuli Liga	6	0	4	0	–		–		10	0
Torpedo Kutaisi	2017	Erovnuli Liga	16	0	3	0	1 (Note: Appearances in UEFA Europa League)	0	0	0	20	0
Torpedo Kutaisi	2018	Erovnuli Liga	12	0	2	0	1	0	–		15	0
Torpedo Kutaisi	2019	Erovnuli Liga	27	0	3	0	2	0	0	0	32	0
Torpedo Kutaisi	Total		81	0	15	1	4	0	0	0	100	1
Saburtalo	2020	Erovnuli Liga	12	0	1	0	1	0	1 (Note: Appearance in Georgian Super Cup)	0	15	0
Dila Gori	2021	Erovnuli Liga	22	0	2	0	0	0	–		24	0
Dila Gori	2022	Erovnuli Liga	31	0	2	0	2 (Note: Appearances in UEFA Conference League)	0	–		35	0
Dila Gori	Total		53	0	4	0	2	0	0	0	59	0
Turon	2023	Uzbekistan Super League	11	1	3	0	–		–		14	1
Torpedo Kutaisi	2023	Erovnuli Liga	7	1	1	0	3	0	–		11	1
Chernomorets Novorossiysk	2023–24	Russian First League	14	0	0	0	–		–		14	0
Chernomorets Novorossiysk	2024–25	Russian First League	27	1	0	0	–		–		27	1
Chernomorets Novorossiysk	Total		41	1	0	0	0	0	0	0	41	1
Orenburg	2025–26	Russian Premier League	15	0	1	0	–		–		16	0
Career total			220	3	25	1	10	0	1	0	256	4
