= Nika Sandokhadze =

Georgian footballer

Personal information
- Full name: Nika Sandokhadze
- Date of birth: 20 February 1994 (age 32)
- Place of birth: Tbilisi, Georgia
- Height: 1.97 m (6 ft 5 1/2 in)
- Position: Centre back

Team information
- Current team: BG Pathum United
- Number: 16

Senior career*
Years	Team	Apps	(Gls)
2011–2012	Dinamo Tbilisi	0	(0)
2012–2013	Torpedo Kutaisi	11	(0)
2014–2015	Locomotive Tbilisi	24	(0)
2015–2017	Samtredia	60	(6)
2018–2019	Karpaty Lviv	13	(0)
2018	→ Rīgas Futbola Skola (loan)	8	(0)
2019	Saburtalo Tbilisi	11	(0)
2020–2022	Dinamo Tbilisi	19	(3)
2020–2021	→ Locomotive Tbilisi (loan)	39	(6)
2022–2024	Torpedo Kutaisi	85	(5)
2025–	BG Pathum United	23	(1)

International career
2010–2011	Georgia U17	5	(0)
2011–2013	Georgia U19	12	(0)
2015	Georgia U21	1	(0)
- * Club domestic league appearances and goals as of 9 January 2026

Nika Sandokhadze (Georgian: ნიკა სანდოხაძე; 20 February 1994) is a Georgian professional footballer who plays as a defender for Thai League 1 club BG Pathum United.

== Honours ==
=== Team ===
Torpedo Kutaisi

- Georgian Cup: 2022
- Georgian Super Cup: 2024

Dinamo Tbilisi

- Erovnuli Liga: 2020

Saburtalo Tbilisi

- Georgian Cup: 2019

Samtredia

- Erovnuli Liga: 2016
- Georgian Super Cup: 2017

=== Individual ===
- Erovnuli liga Team of the Season: 2024
