= 2017 Georgian Super Cup =

| Samtredia | Torpedo Kutaisi |
| 2 | 1 |
- Date: 26 February 2017
- Venue: Murtaz Khurtsilava Stadium, Martvili
- Referee: Arsen Nonikashvili

2017 Georgian Super Cup was a Georgian football match that was played on 26 February 2017 between the champions of 2016 Umaglesi Liga, Samtredia, and the winner of the 2016 Georgian Cup, Torpedo Kutaisi.

== Match details ==
26 February 2017
14:00 UTC+04:00

| Samtredia | 2–1 | Torpedo Kutaisi |
|---|---|---|
| Razhamashvili 28'; Beriashvili 58' | Report | Guruli 17' |

Murtaz Khurtsilava Stadium, Martvili
Attendance: 1,500
Referee: Arsen Nonikashvili

| Samtredia | Torpedo Kutaisi |

| GK | 12 | (Georgia (country)) Omar Migineishvili |
| DF | 3 | (Georgia (country)) Lasha Kasradze |
| DF | 4 | (Georgia (country)) Nika Sandokhadze |
| DF | 20 | (Georgia (country)) Giorgi Akhaladze | | (substituted off) 77' |
| DF | 22 | (Georgia (country)) Giorgi Mchedlishvili |
| MF | 6 | (Ukraine) Giuli Mandzhgaladze |
| MF | 7 | (Georgia (country)) Davit Razhamashvili |
| MF | 8 | (Georgia (country)) Teimuraz Markozashvili |
| MF | 26 | (Georgia (country)) Giorgi Datunaishvili | (yellow card) 45' (yellow-red card) 90+2' |
| FW | 11 | (Georgia (country)) Giorgi Beriashvili |
| FW | 14 | (Georgia (country)) Davit Jikia |
Substitutes:
| GK | 30 | (Georgia (country)) Nika Daushvili |
| FW | 10 | (Georgia (country)) Davit Chagelishvili |
| DF | 15 | (Ukraine) Rudolf Sukhomlynov | | (substituted on) 77' |
| MF | 17 | (Georgia (country)) Akaki Ninua |
| DF | 18 | (Georgia (country)) Jemal Gogiashvili | | (substituted on) 90' |
| MF | 77 | (Georgia (country)) Guram Samushia | | (substituted on) 70' |
| MF | | (Georgia (country)) Davit Manjgaladze |
Manager:
(Georgia (country)) Giorgi Tsetsadze

| GK | 89 | (Georgia (country)) Roin Kvaskhvadze |
| DF | 3 | (Georgia (country)) Guram Adamadze |
| DF | 23 | (Georgia (country)) Giorgi Kimadze |
| DF | 27 | (Georgia (country)) Giorgi Guruli | (yellow card) 58' |
| DF | | (Georgia (country)) David Khurtsilava |
| MF | 8 | (Georgia (country)) Shota Babunashvili | | (substituted off) 61' |
| MF | 10 | (Georgia (country)) Giorgi Kukhianidze |
| MF | 13 | (Georgia (country)) Bidzina Makharoblidze | | (substituted off) 76' |
| MF | 22 | (Georgia (country)) Grigol Dolidze |
| MF | 77 | (Georgia (country)) Merab Gigauri | | (substituted off) 69' |
| FW | 9 | (Georgia (country)) Tornike Kapanadze |
Substitutes:
| GK | 1 | (Georgia (country)) Maksime Kvilitaia |
| DF | 2 | (Georgia (country)) Vazha Tabatadze |
| MF | 6 | (Georgia (country)) Oleg Mamasakhlisi | | (substituted on) 69' |
| MF | 7 | (Georgia (country)) Gabriel Saghrishvili |
| MF | 11 | (Georgia (country)) Nika Sabanadze | | (substituted on) 61' |
| DF | | (Georgia (country)) Anri Tchitchinadze |
| MF | | (Georgia (country)) Beka Tugushi | | (substituted on) 76' |
Manager:
(Georgia (country)) Kakhaber Chkhetiani

== See also ==
- 2017 Umaglesi Liga
- 2017 Georgian Cup
