= Irakli Bugridze =

Georgian football player (born 1998)

Personal information
- Date of birth: 3 January 1998 (age 28)
- Place of birth: Tbilisi, Georgia
- Height: 1.78 m (5 ft 10 in)
- Position: Winger

Team information
- Current team: Jeonnam Dragons
- Number: 27

Youth career
- 2004–2013: Locomotive Tbilisi
- 2014–2015: Dinamo Tbilisi
- 2015–2016: Locomotive Tbilisi

Senior career*
Years	Team	Apps	(Gls)
2016–2017	Locomotive Tbilisi	6	(0)
2018	Chikhura	35	(8)
2018–2019	Beerschot Wilrijk	10	(0)
2020	Dinamo Tbilisi	10	(1)
2021	Dila	28	(2)
2022–2023	Torpedo Kutaisi	59	(12)
2024	Kyzylzhar	12	(0)
2024–2025	Dila	44	(8)
2026	Chungbuk Cheongju	9	(1)
2026–	Jeonnam Dragons	2	(0)

International career^{‡}
2014–2015	Georgia U17	6	(1)
2017–2018	Georgia U20	2	(1)
2018–2020	Georgia U21	13	(4)
- * Club domestic league appearances and goals as of 8 August 2026 ‡ National team caps and goals as of 31 August 2020

Irakli Bugridze (Georgian: ირაკლი ბუღრიძე, romanized: irak'li bughridze; born 3 January 1998) is a Georgian professional footballer who plays as winger for K League 2 club Jeonnam Dragons.

He has won the national league and cup competitions.

== Career ==
Bugridze started his both youth and senior careers at Locomotive Tbilisi. Due to lack of playing time, in 2018 he moved to Chikhura. In an opening game of the season, Bugridze contributed to a 6–1 demolition of Kolkheti 1913 with his first senior league goal. In the summer, he played in all four matches of Chikhura's European campaign.

In January 2019, Bugridze left Chikhura to sign a 1.5-year contract with Belgian second-division club Beerschot, although after making ten appearances he joined Dinamo Tbilisi a year later.

Following a season-long tenure at Dila Gori in 2021, Bugridze spent next two seasons at Torpedo Kutaisi. Being mostly a starting line-up player, he took part in 31 league games in 2023 and with eight goals finished as the second-top scorer behind Giorgi Arabidze. Bugridze also netted two goals in four UEFA Conference League appearances, including a winner against Aktobe.

On 12 February 2024, Kazakhstan Premier League side Kyzylzhar announced the signing of Bugridze. After appearing in twelve league matches for his new club, in the summer break the sides terminated the contract by mutual consent.

Bugridze returned to Georgia to rejoin Dila in early August 2024, with the team leading the league title race at half season. Despite taking part in 17 matches, Bugridze became Dila's third most prolific player with six goals, including two winners, and two assists. A year later he lifted both the national cup and the super cup as Dila won these competitions.

== Career statistics ==
As of match played 10 December 2025

Appearances and goals by club, season and competition
Club	Season	League			National cup		Continental		Other		Total	
Club	Season	Division	Apps	Goals	Apps	Goals	Apps	Goals	Apps	Goals	Apps	Goals
Locomotive Tbilisi	2016	Umaglesi Liga	3	0	0	0	0	0	0	0	3	0
Locomotive Tbilisi	2017	Erovnuli Liga	3	0	1	0	0	0	0	0	4	0
Locomotive Tbilisi	Total		6	0	1	0	0	0	0	0	7	0
Chikhura	2018	Erovnuli Liga	35	8	1	0	4 (Note: Appearances in UEFA Europa League)	0	1 (Note: Appearances in Georgian Super Cup)	1	41	9
Beerschot	2018/19	Challenger Pro League	0	0	0	0	0	0	8 (Note: Appearances for UEFA Europa League play-offs)	0	8	0
Beerschot	2019/20	Challenger Pro League	2	0	0	0	0	0	0	0	2	0
Beerschot	Total		2	0	0	0	0	0	8	0	10	0
Dinamo Tbilisi	2020	Erovnuli Liga	10	1	1	0	1 (Note: Appearances in UEFA Europa Conference League)	0	1	0	12	1
Dila	2021	Erovnuli Liga	28	2	1	0	2	0	0	0	31	2
Torpedo Kutaisi	2022	Erovnuli Liga	28	4	4	1	0	0	1	0	33	5
Torpedo Kutaisi	2023	Erovnuli Liga	31	8	2	0	4	2	2	0	39	10
Torpedo Kutaisi	Total		59	12	6	1	4	2	3	0	72	15
Kyzylzhar	2024	Kazakhstan Premier League	12	0	2	0	0	0	0	0	14	0
Dila	2024	Erovnuli Liga	17	6	0	0	0	0	0	0	17	6
Dila	2025	Erovnuli Liga	27	2	3	0	3	0	1	0	34	2
Dila	Total		44	8	3	0	3	0	1	0	51	8
Chungbuk Cheongju	2026	K League 2	9	1	0	0	0	0	0	0	9	1
Jeonnam Dragons	2026	K League 2	2	0	0	0	0	0	0	0	2	0
Career total		K League 2	207	33	15	1	14	2	13	1	249	32

== Honours ==
Dinamo Tbilisi

- Erovnuli Liga: 2020

Torpedo Kutaisi

- Georgian Cup: 2022

Dila

- Georgian Cup: 2025
- Georgian Super Cup: 2025
