= Mauro Caballero (footballer, born 1994) =

Paraguayan footballer

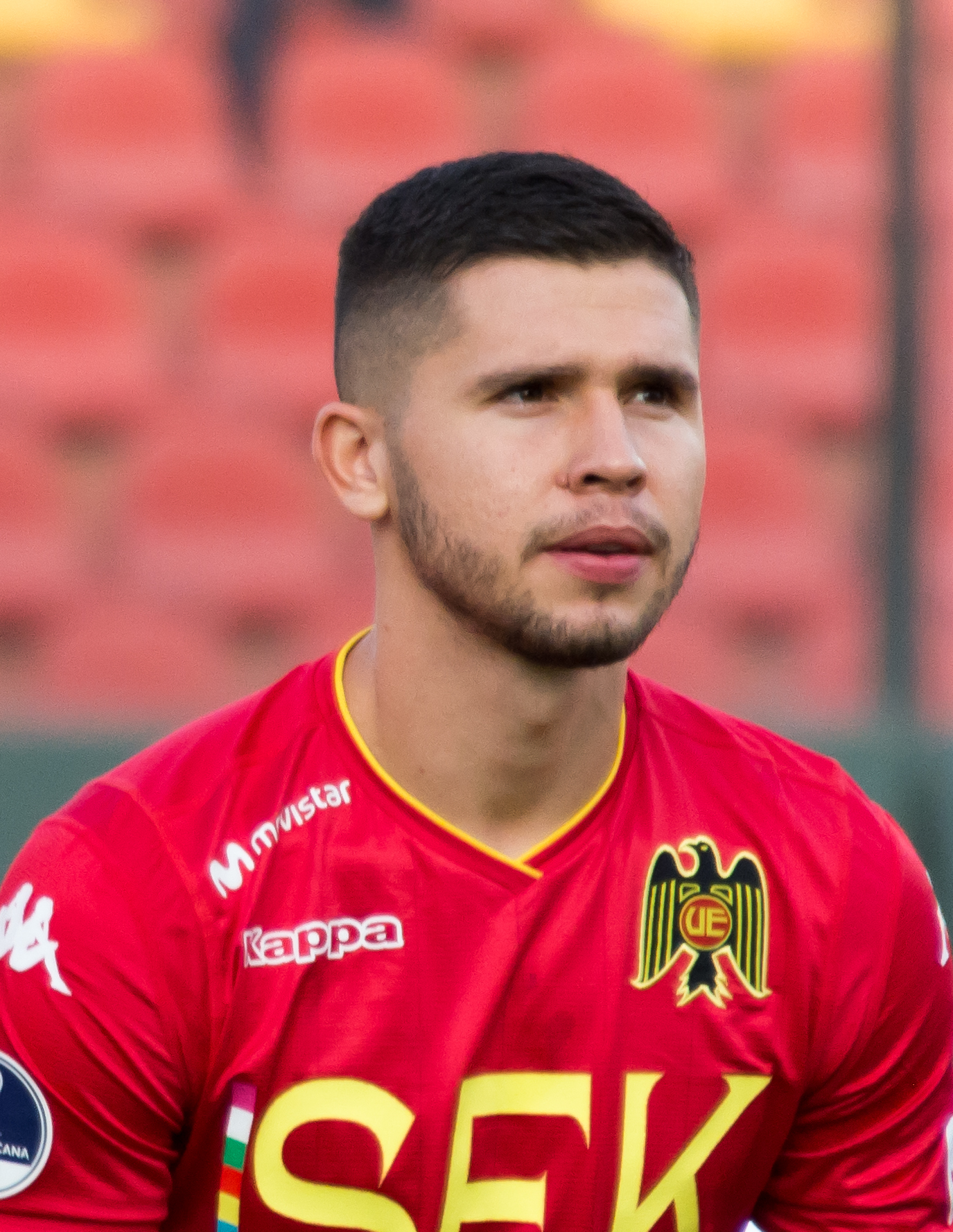
- Caballero with Unión Española in 2019

Personal information
- Full name: Mauro Andrés Caballero Aguilera
- Date of birth: 27 September 1994 (age 32)
- Place of birth: Asunción, Paraguay
- Height: 1.85 m (6 ft 1 in)
- Position: Forward

Team information
- Current team: PSIM Yogyakarta
- Number: 9

Youth career
- Libertad

Senior career*
Years	Team	Apps	(Gls)
2011–2012	Libertad	24	(4)
2013–2017	Porto B	24	(2)
2014	→ Penafiel (loan)	14	(3)
2014–2015	→ Aves (loan)	41	(15)
2015–2016	→ Vaduz (loan)	14	(0)
2016	→ Olimpia (loan)	15	(1)
2017	→ Palestino (loan)	10	(3)
2017	→ San Luis (loan)	14	(5)
2018	San Luis	27	(11)
2019–2020	Unión Española	37	(8)
2021	Arouca	9	(2)
2021–2022	Académica de Coimbra	13	(2)
2022–2023	Torpedo Kutaisi	30	(3)
2024	San Luis	28	(10)
2025	Oliveirense	8	(1)
2025	Águila	19	(3)
2025–2026	Chadormalou Ardakan	2	(1)
2026–	PSIM Yogyakarta	2	(0)
- * Club domestic league appearances and goals as of 18 September 2026

Mauro Andrés Caballero Aguilera (born 27 September 1994) is a Paraguayan professional footballer who plays as a forward for Super League club PSIM Yogyakarta.

== Career ==
Caballero played for Libertad U20 at the 2011 U-20 Copa Libertadores, where he scored 3 goals during the competition, including a double against Universitario de Deportes U20 and one goal against Boca Juniors U20.

On 31 August 2021, he moved to Académica de Coimbra.

In 2024, he joined Primera B de Chile club San Luis de Quillota from Georgian club Torpedo Kutaisi.

== Personal life ==
He is the son of the former Paraguayan international footballer of the same name, Mauro Antonio Caballero, who played for the club Torpedo Kutaisi.

== Honours ==
Olimpia

- Paraguayan Primera División: 2012 Clausura

FC Vaduz

- Liechtenstein Cup: 2015–16

Torpedo Kutaisi

- Georgian Cup: 2022

Paraguay U-15

- South American Under-15 Football Championship: 2009
