= Felipe Pires =

Brazilian footballer (born 1995)

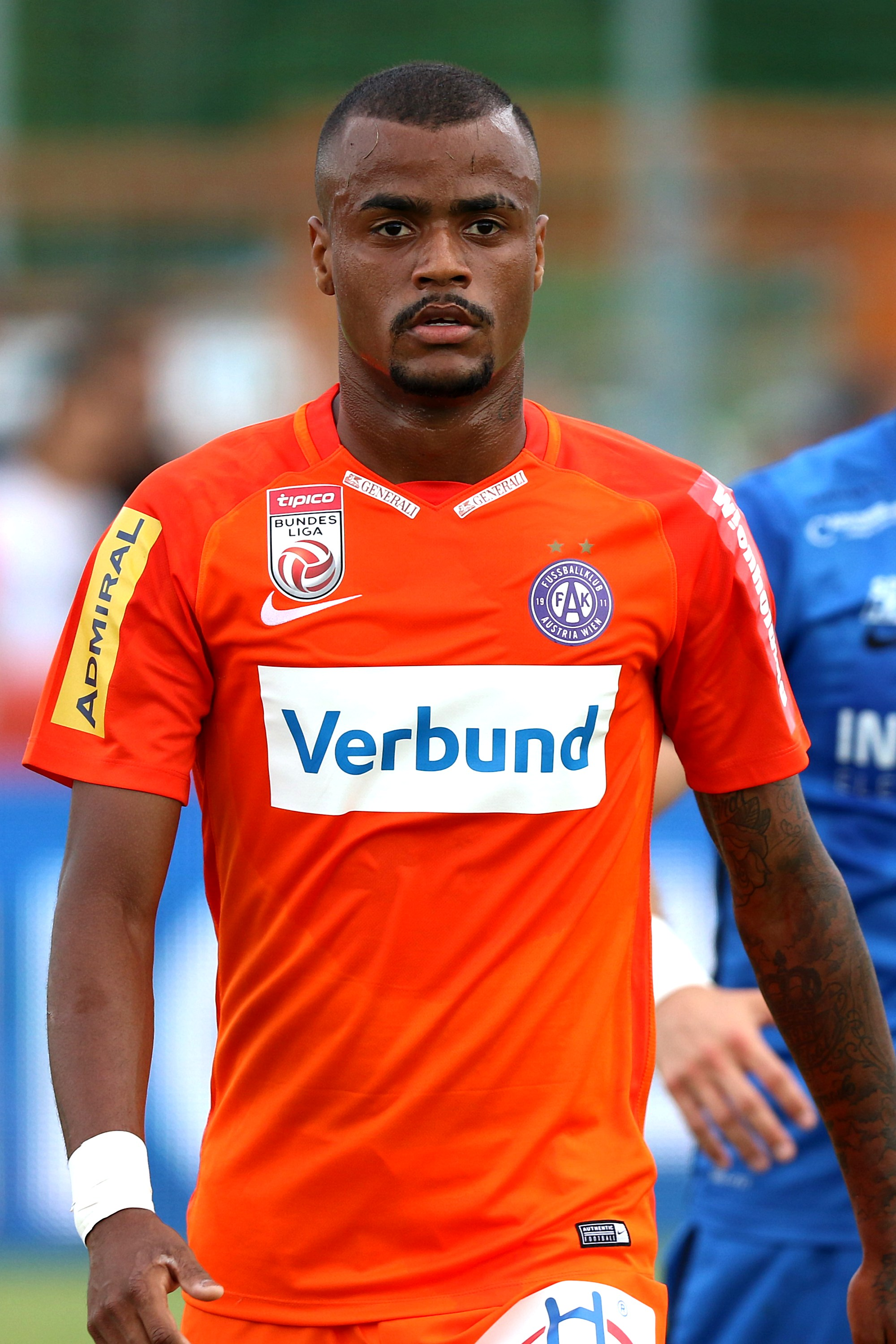
- Pires with Austria Wien in 2017

Personal information
- Full name: Felipe Augusto Rodrigues Pires
- Date of birth: 18 April 1995 (age 31)
- Place of birth: São Paulo, Brazil
- Height: 1.78 m (5 ft 10 in)
- Position: Winger

Youth career
- –2014: Red Bull Brasil

Senior career*
Years	Team	Apps	(Gls)
2014–2015	Liefering	27	(11)
2015	Red Bull Salzburg	9	(1)
2015–2020	1899 Hoffenheim	0	(0)
2015–2016	→ FSV Frankfurt (loan)	20	(1)
2016–2018	→ Austria Wien (loan)	66	(11)
2019	→ Palmeiras (loan)	2	(0)
2019–2020	→ Fortaleza (loan)	11	(1)
2020	→ Rijeka (loan)	5	(1)
2020–2022	Moreirense	44	(5)
2022	Dnipro-1	2	(0)
2022	→ ADO Den Haag (loan)	3	(0)
2022–2023	→ Juventude (loan)	11	(0)
2023	→ Volos (loan)	17	(1)
2023–2024	Dnipro-1	2	(0)
2024–	Torpedo Kutaisi	85	(15)
- * Club domestic league appearances and goals as of 1 September 2026

Felipe Augusto Rodrigues Pires (born 18 April 1995) is a Brazilian professional footballer who plays as a forward for Georgian club Torpedo Kutaisi.

== Club career ==
Pires made his European debut for Red Bull Salzburg on 19 February 2015 in a 1–2 away defeat to Villarreal in the last 32 first leg of the UEFA Europa League, replacing Massimo Bruno after 64 minutes. A week later in the second leg, he came on at half time for Takumi Minamino in a 1–3 defeat which eliminated his club. On 6 June, he scored the latter goal as Salzburg defeated Austria Vienna 2–0 in the Austrian Cup title to win the double.

On 25 August 2015, it was announced that Pires had signed with Hoffenheim for an undisclosed fee. The next day, he was loaned to FSV Frankfurt of the 2. Bundesliga.

On 24 June 2016, Pires was loaned to Austria Wien until the end of the season.

On 12 September 2020, Pires signed with Moreirense F.C.

On 31 January 2024, Erovnuli Liga club Torpedo Kutaisi announced signing Pires on a two-year deal. With six goals he became the team's second topscorer after Bjørn Johnsen. Pires also made ten assists which turned out the best result of this season.

== Career statistics ==
As of match played on 5 May 2018

Appearances and goals by club, season and competition
Club	Season	League			Cup		League Cup		Other		Total	
Club	Season	Division	Apps	Goals	Apps	Goals	Apps	Goals	Apps	Goals	Apps	Goals
Liefering	2014–15	Austrian First League	27	11	0	0	—		—		27	11
Red Bull Salzburg	2014–15	Austrian Bundesliga	7	1	2	1	—		2 (Note: Appearance(s) in UEFA Europa League)	0	11	2
Red Bull Salzburg	2015–16	Austrian Bundesliga	2	0	0	0	—		2 (Note: Appearance(s) in UEFA Champions League)	0	4	0
Red Bull Salzburg	Total		9	1	2	1	0	0	4	0	15	2
FSV Frankfurt (loan)	2015–16	2. Bundesliga	20	1	1	0	—		—		21	1
Austria Wien (loan)	2016–17	Austrian Bundesliga	34	4	4	2	—		12	2	50	8
Austria Wien (loan)	2017–18	Austrian Bundesliga	32	7	3	0	—		10	1	45	8
Austria Wien (loan)	Total		66	11	7	2	0	0	22	3	95	16
Career total			122	24	10	3	0	0	26	3	158	30

== Honours ==
Red Bull Salzburg

- Austrian Football Bundesliga: 2014–15
- Austrian Cup: 2014–15

Torpedo Kutaisi

- Georgian Super Cup: 2024
