= Pedro Monteiro (footballer) =

Portuguese footballer (born 1994)

Personal information
- Full name: Pedro Filipe Tinoco Monteiro
- Date of birth: 30 January 1994 (age 32)
- Place of birth: Paços de Ferreira, Portugal
- Height: 1.90 m (6 ft 3 in)
- Position: Centre-back

Team information
- Current team: Madura United
- Number: 3

Youth career
- 2002–2007: Paços Ferreira
- 2007–2008: Porto
- 2008–2013: Freamunde

Senior career*
Years	Team	Apps	(Gls)
2013–2014	Freamunde	20	(4)
2014–2016	Braga B	43	(2)
2014–2017	Braga	2	(0)
2014–2015	→ Freamunde (loan)	22	(1)
2016	→ Apollon Limassol (loan)	8	(0)
2016–2017	→ Paços Ferreira (loan)	9	(0)
2017–2018	Estoril	18	(1)
2018–2020	Leixões	30	(0)
2020–2021	Feirense	15	(0)
2021–2022	Académico Viseu	31	(0)
2022–2024	Torpedo Kutaisi	63	(1)
2024–	Madura United	67	(3)
- * Club domestic league appearances and goals as of 22:35, 6 September 2026 (UTC)

Pedro Filipe Tinoco Monteiro (born 30 January 1994) is a Portuguese professional footballer who plays as a centre-back for Super League club Madura United.

== Club career ==
=== Freamunde ===
Born in Paços de Ferreira, Monteiro finished his youth career with local club S.C. Freamunde. His first season as a senior was 2013–14, when he helped to promotion to the Segunda Liga as champions. He made his debut in the competition on 9 August 2014 in a 1–0 home win against Atlético Clube de Portugal, and scored his first goal the following 11 January to open the 3–0 victory over C.D. Trofense also at the Complexo Desportivo do SC Freamunde.

=== Braga ===
Monteiro was recalled by S.C. Braga in January 2015, from Freamunde where he was serving a loan. Being initially assigned to the reserve team, he played mostly with them also in the second division; his first match occurred on 8 February, in a 2–3 home loss to G.D. Chaves where he featured the full 90 minutes.

Monteiro made three competitive appearances at the Estádio Municipal de Braga; his Primeira Liga bow took place on 30 January 2015, in the 1–0 home defeat of Moreirense FC. Whilst under contract, he also served loans at Apollon Limassol FC (where he won the Cypriot Cup under his compatriot Pedro Emanuel) and F.C. Paços de Ferreira.

=== Estoril ===
On 10 July 2017, Monteiro joined G.D. Estoril Praia on a three-year deal. He scored his only goal in the top flight on 14 August, in a 3–0 home win over Vitória de Guimarães; the campaign ended in relegation.

=== Later career ===
Monteiro subsequently competed in the Portuguese second tier, with Leixões SC, C.D. Feirense and Académico de Viseu FC. In the summer of 2022, he signed a contract with Georgian club FC Torpedo Kutaisi. In his debut season, he scored three times in four appearances as they won the Georgian Cup.

On 20 July 2024, Madura United F.C. announced the signing of Monteiro.

== Honours ==
Freamunde

- Campeonato Nacional de Seniores: 2013–14

Apollon Limassol

- Cypriot Cup: 2015–16

Torpedo Kutaisi

- Georgian Cup: 2022
- Georgian Super Cup: 2024
