= Merab Gigauri =

Georgian footballer

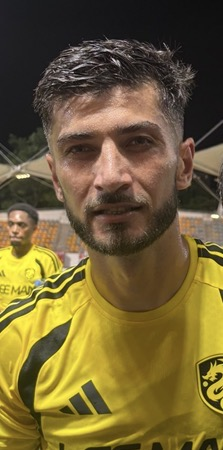

Personal information
- Date of birth: 5 June 1993 (age 33)
- Place of birth: Tbilisi, Georgia
- Height: 1.82 m (6 ft 0 in)
- Position: Midfielder

Team information
- Current team: Lee Man
- Number: 77

Youth career
- Torpedo Kutaisi

Senior career*
Years	Team	Apps	(Gls)
2010–2014	Torpedo Kutaisi	63	(3)
2011–2012	→ Jagiellonia Białystok (loan)	3	(0)
2014	Metalurgi Rustavi	11	(2)
2014	Tskhinvali	14	(2)
2015	Kolkheti 1913	14	(2)
2015	Tskhinvali	2	(0)
2015–2016	Kolkheti 1913	24	(3)
2016	Rustavi	14	(4)
2017–2019	Torpedo Kutaisi	82	(2)
2019–2021	Gabala	40	(1)
2021–2022	Shamakhi	24	(2)
2022–2025	Torpedo Kutaisi	77	(3)
2025–	Lee Man	24	(2)

International career
2010	Georgia U17	1	(0)
2012	Georgia U19	6	(0)
2013	Georgia U21	1	(0)
2013	Georgia	1	(0)
- * Club domestic league appearances and goals as of 7 November 2026

Merab Gigauri (Georgian: მერაბ გიგაური; born 5 June 1993) is a Georgian professional footballer who currently plays as a midfielder for Hong Kong Premier League club Lee Man.

== Club career ==
Gigauri started his professional career at Torpedo Kutaisi in 2010. He scored his top-flight goal in a 1–0 win against Zestaponi.

After the first season, Gigauri left the club on loan. He made his Ekstraklasa debut for Jagiellonia Białystok on 26 November 2011 in a game against ŁKS Łódź as a 58th-minute substitute for Hermes. Despite the lack of playing time, his desire was to stay on with this club, although he returned to Torpedo after the loan agreement had expired.

In July 2016, he joined Pirveli Liga side Rustavi, who won their league group this season in spite of a six-point deduction.

At the end of 2016, Gigauri moved to Torpedo again, where he earned four trophies, including the league title in 2017.

When a severe financial crisis hit the club in mid-2019, twelve players were forced to find new teams. On 27 June 2019, Gigauri signed a one-year contract with Gabala. During the first fourteen games he was four times included in the symbolic team of the league.

In the summer of 2022, Gigauri started his fourth spell at Torpedo, where he was confirmed as the team captain next May. Gigauri netted his first European goal with Torpedo in 2023. His injury-time leveller against FK Sarajevo helped the team to make it through to the second round of the UEFA Conference League.

On 8 November 2024, Gigauri was greeted with heartwarming gestures from the fans on his 250th appearance for Torpedo in a 1–0 win over Dinamo Batumi.

On 4 July 2025, Gigauri joined Hong Kong Premier League club Lee Man.

== International career ==
On 5 June 2013, Gigauri made his debut for Georgia national football team in a friendly against Denmark.

== Career statistics ==
=== Club ===
As of match played 17 May 2026

Club statistics
Club	Season	League			Cup		Continental		Other		Total	
Club	Season	Division	Apps	Goals	Apps	Goals	Apps	Goals	Apps	Goals	Apps	Goals
Torpedo Kutaisi	2010–11	Umaglesi Liga	20	1	3	0	—		—		23	1
Torpedo Kutaisi	2012–13	Umaglesi Liga	28	1	4	0	—		—		32	1
Torpedo Kutaisi	2013–14	Umaglesi Liga	15	1	1	0	2	0	—		18	1
Torpedo Kutaisi	Total		63	3	8	0	2	0	—		73	3
Jagiellonia (loan)	2011–12	Ekstraklasa	3	0	0	0	—		—		3	0
Metalurgi	2013–14	Umaglesi Liga	11	2	2	0	—		—		13	2
Tskhinvali	2014–15	Umaglesi Liga	14	2	4	0	—		—		18	2
Kolkheti Poti	2014–15	Umaglesi Liga	14	2	—		—		—		14	2
Tskhinvali	2015–16	Umaglesi Liga	2	0	—		2	0	—		4	0
Kolkheti Poti	2015–16	Umaglesi Liga	24	3	2	0	—		—		26	3
Rustavi	2016	Pirveli Liga	14	4	—		—		—		14	4
Torpedo Kutaisi	2017	Erovnuli Liga	31	0	5	0	2	0	1	0	39	0
Torpedo Kutaisi	2018	Erovnuli Liga	32	2	5	1	2	0	1	0	40	3
Torpedo Kutaisi	2019	Erovnuli Liga	19	0	1	0	—		1	1	21	1
Gabala	2019–20	Azerbaijan Premier League	18	0	2	0	2	0	—		22	0
Gabala	2020–21	Azerbaijan Premier League	22	1	3	0	—		—		25	1
Gabala	Total		40	1	5	0	2	0	—		47	1
Shamakhi	2021–22	Azerbaijan Premier League	24	2	3	0	2	0	—		29	2
Torpedo Kutaisi	2022	Erovnuli Liga	14	1	5	1	—		—		19	2
Torpedo Kutaisi	2023	Erovnuli Liga	25	0	1	0	4	1	2	0	32	1
Torpedo Kutaisi	2024	Erovnuli Liga	23	1	1	0	4	0	2	0	30	1
Torpedo Kutaisi	2025	Erovnuli Liga	15	1	0	0	0	0	0	0	15	1
Torpedo Kutaisi	Total		222	8	26	1	14	2	7	1	269	12
Lee Man	2025–26	Hong Kong Premier League	18	2	6	2	0	0	0	0	24	4
Career total			386	26	48	4	20	1	7	1	461	32

== Honours ==
Torpedo Kutaisi

- Erovnuli Liga: 2017
- Georgian Cup: 2018, 2022
- Georgian Super Cup: 2018, 2019, 2024

Lee Man

- Hong Kong League Cup: 2025–26
