= Nilton Terroso =

French football coach and former player

Personal information
- Full name: Nilton dos Santos Terroso
- Date of birth: 13 September 1979 (age 47)
- Place of birth: Remiremont, France
- Position: Midfielder

Youth career
- 1995–1997: Lourinhanense

Senior career*
Years	Team	Apps	(Gls)
1997–2001	Lourinhanense	84	(5)
2001	Sans Souci		
2002–2004	Riachense		
2004–2005	Lourinhanense		

International career
1995	Canada U15		
1995	Canada U17		
2001	Canada U23	1	(0)

Managerial career
- 2011–2013: Cardiff City (assistant)
- 2016: Atlético
- 2017–2018: Olhanense
- * Club domestic league appearances and goals

Nilton dos Santos Terroso (born 13 September 1979) is a former footballer who played as a midfielder, and is a coach.

== Early life ==
Terroso was born in France and grew up in Prince George, British Columbia, Canada. He represented the latter nation at three age-group levels.

== Playing career ==
Having moved to Portugal still in his formative years, Terroso never competed in higher than the Portuguese Second Division as a senior. He had two spells at S.C. Lourinhanense (Sporting CP's farm team, where he played alongside Simão Sabrosa), and also represented Clube Atlético Riachense.

== Coaching career ==
In 2007, Terroso joined Cardiff City as youth team fitness coach. Two years later, he was appointed assistant manager of their under-18 side, and worked with them for two years.

Starting in 2010, Terroso acted as fitness coach to the Welsh under-17s during one year. Subsequently, he joined Malky Mackay's staff at Cardiff City's first team in the English Championship, still being his assistant when the club promoted to the Premier League at the end of the 2012–13 season.

In June 2014, Terroso was named head coach of Cardiff's under-21 team. At the end of the campaign, he left.

On 1 March 2016, 11 years after he last set foot in the country, Terroso returned to Portugal and was appointed at LigaPro club Atlético Clube de Portugal. After not being able to prevent relegation, he left.

Terroso signed as manager of S.C. Olhanense from the Campeonato de Portugal on 17 November 2017, succeeding Bruno Saraiva.

== Personal life ==
Terroso is a qualified UEFA B licence coach, having completed a degree in football coaching and performance plus sports science.
