= Giorgi Pantsulaia =

Georgian footballer (born 1994)

Personal information
- Date of birth: 6 January 1994 (age 32)
- Place of birth: Tbilisi, Georgia
- Height: 1.81 m (5 ft 11 in)
- Position: Striker

Team information
- Current team: Kattaqorgon

Senior career*
Years	Team	Apps	(Gls)
2011–2013	Torpedo Kutaisi	40	(5)
2014	Zestaponi	26	(3)
2015	Tskhinvali	1	(0)
2015–2017	Saburtalo	45	(12)
2017–2018	Dila Gori	26	(8)
2018	Samtredia	8	(4)
2019	Chikhura	20	(5)
2020	Torpedo Kutaisi	17	(7)
2021–2022	Dinamo Batumi	64	(19)
2023	Kaspiy	13	(6)
2023	Torpedo Kutaisi	13	(3)
2024	Samgurali	12	(6)
2024	Zhenis	12	(1)
2025–2026	Samgurali	35	(17)
2026–	Kattaqorgon	0	(0)

International career^{‡}
2010–2011	Georgia U17	4	(0)
2012–2013	Georgia U19	7	(2)
2013–2015	Georgia U21	8	(0)
- * Club domestic league appearances and goals as of 13 March 2026 ‡ National team caps and goals as of 17 September 2023

Giorgi Pantsulaia (Georgian: გიორგი ფანცულაია; born 6 January 1994) is a Georgian professional footballer who plays as a forward for Uzbekistan Pro League club Kattaqorgon.

Pantsulaia is the son of Mamuka Pantsulaia, a joint top scorer of the inaugural season of the Georgian championship and participant of the national team's historic first official match.

Giorgi Pantsulaia was a squad member of national youth teams, including in 2013 UEFA European Under-19 Championship. He has won the Erovnuli Liga and Georgian Super Cup with Dinamo Batumi.

== Career ==
Panstulaia started his professional Torpedo Kutaisi at the age of 17. In a first top-league game against Kolkheti Poti he came off the bench to replace Revaz Gotsiridze on 8 March 2012. On 20 May 2012, the young forward netted his first goal in a 3–2 win over Dila Gori. His brace in a dramatic 5–4 victory over the same opponents the next season sealed the third place for Torpedo in 2013.

At the end of the 2014–15 season Pantsulaia signed a two-year contract with newly promoted club Saburtalo Tbilisi.

Panstulaia returned to Torpedo in 2020 and took part in 17 out of 18 games of the season shortened by COVID-19. In early 2021, he moved to Dinamo Batumi on a two-year deal. In the same year, he won the league title followed by the Georgian Super Cup. Following this season, Pansulaia was included in Team of the Year.

Pantsulaia's first tenure with a foreign club was short-lived. He played with Kazakh side Kaspiy several months only, his contract being terminated on mutual agreement. He was among those eight foreign players who decided to part ways with the club due to some financial issues.

In July 2023, he joined Torpedo Kutaisi for the third time.

In early April 2024, Pantsulaia signed a season-long contract with Samgurali, although left the club in the summer break despite being among the top five scorers of the season. Following a brief spell at Kazakh club Zhenis, he returned to Samgurali in January 2025. With 17 goals netted in 2025, Pantsulaia finished as a runner-up among the league topscorers. The Erovnuli Liga consequently named him in Team of the Year for the second time.

== Statistics ==
As of match played 6 December 2025

Appearances and goals by club, season and competition
Club	Season	League			National Cup		Continental		Other		Total	
Club	Season	Division	Apps	Goals	Apps	Goals	Apps	Goals	Apps	Goals	Apps	Goals
Torpedo Kutaisi	2011/12	Umaglesi/ Erovnuli Liga	6	1	–		–		–		6	1
Torpedo Kutaisi	2012/13	Umaglesi/ Erovnuli Liga	21	3	4	2	1	0	–		26	5
Torpedo Kutaisi	2013/14	Umaglesi/ Erovnuli Liga	13	1	2	2	1	0	–		16	3
Torpedo Kutaisi	2020	Umaglesi/ Erovnuli Liga	17	7	2	3	–		2 (Note: Appearances in Erovnuli Liga playoffs)	1	21	11
Torpedo Kutaisi	2023	Umaglesi/ Erovnuli Liga	13	3	2	2	4	0	–		19	5
Torpedo Kutaisi	Total		70	15	10	9	6	0	2	1	88	25
Zestaponi	2013/14	Umaglesi Liga	12	1	–		–		–		12	1
Zestaponi	2014/15	Umaglesi Liga	14	2	2	0	2 (Note: Appearances in UEFA Europa League)	0	–		18	2
Zestaponi	Total		26	3	2	0	2	0	0	0	30	3
Saburtalo	2015/16	Umaglesi Liga	27	7	2	0	–		–		29	7
Saburtalo	2016	Umaglesi Liga	13	3	1	1	–		–		14	4
Saburtalo	2017	Umaglesi Liga	5	2	1	0	–		–		6	2
Saburtalo	Total		45	12	4	1	0	0	0	0	49	13
Dila Gori	2017	Erovnuli Liga	13	6	1	0	–		–		14	6
Dila Gori	2018	Erovnuli Liga	13	2	1	5	–		–		14	7
Dila Gori	Total		26	8	2	5	0	0	0	0	28	13
Samtredia	2018	Erovnuli Liga	8	4	–		1	0	2	2	11	6
Chikhura	2019	Erovnuli Liga	20	5	–	–	4	0	–		24	5
Dinamo Batumi	2021	Erovnuli Liga	35	13	4	3	6 (Note: Appearances in UEFA Conference League)	3	–		45	19
Dinamo Batumi	2022	Erovnuli Liga	29	6	1	0	2	0	1 (Note: Appearances in Georgian Super Cup)	0	33	6
Dinamo Batumi	Total		64	19	5	3	8	3	1	0	78	25
Kaspiy	2023	KPL	13	6	1	0	–		–		14	6
Samgurali	2024	Erovnuli Liga	12	6	–	–	–		–		12	6
Samgurali	2025	Erovnuli Liga	35	17	–	–	–		–		35	17
Samgurali	Total		47	23	0	0	0	0	0	0	47	23
Zhenis	2024	KPL	12	1	2	1	–		–		14	2
Career total			332	96	26	19	21	3	5	3	384	121

== Honours ==
=== Dinamo Batumi ===
Erovnuli Liga (1): 2021

Georgian Super Cup (1): 2022

=== Individual ===
==== Erovnuli Liga Team of the Year ====
- 2021
- 2025

==== Most goals in a season ====
- Dila: 2017
- Samtredia: 2018
- Torpedo Kutaisi: 2020
- Dinamo Batumi: 2021 (shared)
- Samgurali: 2025
