= Giuli Mandzhgaladze =

Ukrainian footballer

Personal information
- Full name: Giuli Mandzhgaladze
- Date of birth: 9 September 1992 (age 34)
- Place of birth: Ukraine
- Height: 1.70 m (5 ft 7 in)
- Position: Midfielder

Team information
- Current team: Samtredia
- Number: 7

Youth career
- 2009: Zorya Luhansk

Senior career*
Years	Team	Apps	(Gls)
2009–2014	Zorya Luhansk	0	(0)
2014–2015	Poltava	2	(0)
2015	Chikhura Sachkhere	8	(1)
2015–2016	Sioni Bolnisi	25	(2)
2016–2017	Samtredia	49	(6)
2018	Kapaz	12	(0)
2018	Ventspils	8	(2)
2019–2021	Dinamo Batumi	75	(7)
2022–2024	Torpedo Kutaisi	84	(3)
2025–	Samtredia	46	(1)
- * Club domestic league appearances and goals as of 11 July 2026

Giuli Mandzhgaladze (Ukrainian: Гіулі Шотайович Манджгаладзе, Georgian: გიული "გია" მანჯგალაძე; born 9 September 1992), also spelled as Manjgaladze, is a Georgian and Ukrainian professional footballer who plays as a midfielder for Samtredia in the Erovnuli Liga 2.

== Career ==
He spent four years playing for the FC Zorya Luhansk reserves team in the Ukrainian Premier Reserve League. In July 2014 Mandzhgaladze signed a contract with FC Poltava and played in the Ukrainian First League, but in September he left the club.

Mandzhgaladze signed for Dinamo Batumi in the Erovnuli Liga in January 2019. Two years later he helped the team to claim their first champion's title.

In January 2022, Mandzhgaladze joined Torpedo. In the next three years, he lifted the Georgian Cup and Supercup.

In February 2025, the player reunited with 2nd division side Samtredia after an eight-year pause.

== Honours ==
Torpedo Kutaisi

- Georgian Cup: 2022
- Georgian Super Cup: 2024

Dinamo Batumi

- Erovnuli Liga: 2021
- Georgian Super Cup: 2022

Samtredia

- Umaglesi Liga: 2016
- Georgian Super Cup: 2017
