= Kayke David =

Brazilian footballer

Personal information
- Full name: Kayke David Pereira
- Date of birth: 22 January 2003 (age 23)
- Place of birth: Brazil
- Height: 1.75 m (5 ft 9 in)
- Position: Midfielder

Team information
- Current team: North District
- Number: 20

Youth career
- 2020: Nova Iguaçu
- 2020–2022: → Flamengo (loan)

Senior career*
| Years | Team | Apps | (Gls) |
| 2022–2025 | Nova Iguaçu | 14 | (1) |
| 2022 | → Flamengo (loan) | 2 | (0) |
| 2023 | → Torpedo Kutaisi (loan) | 19 | (1) |
| 2025– | North District | 22 | (6) |
- * Club domestic league appearances and goals as of 8 November 2026

Kayke David Pereira (born 22 January 2003), simply known as Kayke David, is a Brazilian professional footballer who currently plays as a midfielder for Hong Kong Premier League club North District.

== Club career ==
Kayke David began his career with Flamengo and made his professional debut for the club on 26 January 2022 against Portuguesa da Ilha. He came on as a 76th minute substitute for Igor Jesus as Flamengo win the match 2–1.

In January 2023, Kayke David joined Georgian club Torpedo Kutaisi on a 1.5 year-long loan deal.

On 6 August 2025, Kayke David joined Hong Kong Premier League club North District.

== Career statistics ==
=== Club ===
As of 8 October 2023

| Club | Season | League | | | State League | | Cup | | Continental | | Other | | Total | |
| Club | Season | Division | Apps | Goals | Apps | Goals | Apps | Goals | Apps | Goals | Apps | Goals | Apps | Goals |
|---|---|---|---|---|---|---|---|---|---|---|---|---|---|---|
| Flamengo | 2022 | Série A | 2 | 0 | 2 (Note: Appearance(s) in the Campeonato Carioca.) | 0 | 0 | 0 | 0 | 0 | 0 | 0 | 4 | 0 |
| Flamengo | 2022 | Campeonato Carioca | 2 | 0 | 0 | 0 | 0 | 0 | 0 | 0 | 0 | 0 | 2 | 0 |
| Torpedo Kutaisi | 2023 | Erovnuli Liga | 19 | 1 | 2 | 0 | 1 | 0 | 3 (Note: Appearances in UEFA Europa League) | 0 | 1 (Note: Appearance in Georgian Super Cup) | 0 | 26 | 1 |
| Career total | | | 23 | 1 | 4 | 0 | 1 | 0 | 3 | 0 | 1 | 0 | 32 | 1 |

== Honours ==
Flamengo

- Copa Libertadores: 2022
