= Giorgi Arabidze =

Georgian professional footballer

Personal information
- Date of birth: 4 March 1998 (age 28)
- Place of birth: Vani, Georgia
- Height: 1.73 m (5 ft 8 in)
- Position: Winger

Youth career
- 2005–2013: Locomotive Tbilisi

Senior career*
Years	Team	Apps	(Gls)
2013–2015	Locomotive Tbilisi	33	(21)
2015–2018	Shakhtar Donetsk	3	(0)
2018–2022	Nacional	10	(0)
2019	→ Adanaspor (loan)	6	(1)
2021	→ Rotor Volgograd (loan)	4	(0)
2021–2022	→ Samtredia (loan)	15	(3)
2022–2024	Torpedo Kutaisi	73	(24)
2024–2025	Ulsan HD	7	(2)
2025–2026	Torpedo Kutaisi	28	(8)

International career^{‡}
2013	Georgia U16	1	(1)
2014–2015	Georgia U17	10	(6)
2014–2017	Georgia U19	10	(0)
2017–2019	Georgia U21	9	(3)
2016-2017	Georgia	4	(3)
- * Club domestic league appearances and goals as of 3 November 2026 ‡ National team caps and goals as of 21 November 2017

Giorgi Arabidze (Georgian: გიორგი არაბიძე; born 4 March 1998) is a Georgian professional footballer who most recently played as a winger for Erovnuli Liga club Torpedo Kutaisi.

He is the winner of several trophies in the Ukrainian, Georgian and South Korean leagues. Arabidze has represented the national senior as well as all junior teams.

== Career ==
=== Club career ===
Arabidze is a product of the FC Locomotive Youth Sportive system from age 7.

In June 2015 he signed a contract with Ukrainian football club FC Shakhtar. Arabidze made an official debut for the Ukrainian club three months later against Ternopil in the Ukrainian Cup, spending the full 90 minutes on the pitch.

Arabidze featured again for Shakhtar on the last day of October, making his debut in the Ukrainian Premier League, playing the last 15 minutes of the game against Zorya Luhansk.

Arabidze was included in the UEFA Youth League squad for the same season as well. He made a debut in this tournament against Malmö FF, scoring a single goal and contributing one assist in a 5–5 draw.

On 3 July 2018 he signed 4-year contract with Portuguese club C.D. Nacional.

On 17 January 2021, he joined Russian club Rotor Volgograd on loan until the end of the 2020–21 season.

On 25 January 2022, he signed with Torpedo Kutaisi. During his second season with this club, Arabidze became their top scorer by netting 14 goals which helped the team to win the bronze medals of the league. His performance was duly recognized by the Erovnuli Liga by naming him Midfielder of the Year. Besides, along with two other teammates Arabidze was included in the list of eleven best players of the season.

In July 2024, Arabidze moved to South Korea to play for K League 1 club Ulsan HD. In his second league appearance for Ulsan on 31 August, Arabidze got on the scoresheet with a brace in a 5–4 win over Pohang. After making ten appearances in all competitions, he lifted the league trophy as Ulsan secured their third straight title.

In 2026, Arabidze rejoined Torpedo. In 28 league games for the team, he scored eight times and provided 13 assists, becoming the most prolific player of the season. Before his unexpected departure from the club in late October, Arabidze was 11 times named by sport newspaper Lelo in symbolic teams of the league.

=== International career ===
In 2017, after being a regular member of the youth sides of Georgia national football team, Arabidze made his debut for the senior national team against Serbia in 2018 FIFA World Cup qualification match. Two days later he scored his first goal for the team against Latvia in a friendly game.

== Career statistics ==
As of match played 26 October 2026

Appearances and goals by club, season and competition
Club	Season	League			National Cup		Continental		Other		Total	
Club	Season	Division	Apps	Goals	Apps	Goals	Apps	Goals	Apps	Goals	Apps	Goals
Locomotive Tbilisi	2013/14	Pirveli Liga	16	8	1	1	0	0	0	0	17	9
Locomotive Tbilisi	2014/15	Pirveli Liga	17	13	0	0	0	0	1 (Note: Appearance in play-offs)	0	18	13
Locomotive Tbilisi	Total		33	21	1	1	0	0	1	0	35	22
Shakhtar Donetsk	2015/16	Ukrainian Premier League	2	0	1	0	0	0	3 (Note: Appearances in UEFA Youth League)	1	6	1
Shakhtar Donetsk	2016/17	Ukrainian Premier League	1	0	0	0	0	0	0	0	1	0
Shakhtar Donetsk	2017/18	Ukrainian Premier League	0	0	0	0	0	0	0	0	0	0
Shakhtar Donetsk	Total		3	0	1	0	0	0	3	1	7	1
Nacional	2018/19	Primeira Liga	10	0	1	1	0	0	0	0	11	1
Adanaspor (loan)	2019/20	TFF First League	6	1	1	1	0	0	0	0	7	2
Rotor Volgograd (loan)	2020/21	Russian Premier League	4	0	0	0	0	0	0	0	4	0
Samtredia (loan)	2021	Erovnuli Liga	15	3	0	0	0	0	0	0	15	3
Torpedo Kutaisi	2022	Erovnuli Liga	29	5	4	0	0	0	0	0	33	5
Torpedo Kutaisi	2023	Erovnuli Liga	30	14	1	0	4 (Note: Appearances in Conference League)	2	2 (Note: Appearances in Georgian Super Cup)	0	37	16
Torpedo Kutaisi	2024	Erovnuli Liga	14	5	0	0	0	0	0	0	14	5
Torpedo Kutaisi	2026	Erovnuli Liga	28	8	1	0	2	0	2	1	33	9
Torpedo Kutaisi	Total		101	32	6	0	6	2	4	1	117	35
Ulsan	2024	K League 1	7	2	1	0	3	0	0	0	11	2
Career total			179	59	11	3	9	2	8	2	207	66

=== International goals ===
Scores and results list Georgia's goal tally first.

No	Date	Venue	Opponent	Score	Result	Competition
1.	28 March 2017	Boris Paichadze Dinamo Arena, Tbilisi, Georgia	Latvia	5–0	5–0	Friendly
2.	7 June 2017	Mikheil Meskhi Stadium, Tbilisi, Georgia	Saint Kitts and Nevis	1–0	3–0	Friendly
3.	7 June 2017	Mikheil Meskhi Stadium, Tbilisi, Georgia	Saint Kitts and Nevis	2–0	3–0	Friendly

== Honours ==
Shakhtar Donetsk

- Ukrainian Premier League: 2016–17, 2017–18
- Ukrainian Cup: 2015–16, 2016–17, 2017–18
- Ukrainian Super Cup: 2015, 2017

Torpedo Kutaisi

- Georgian Cup: 2022
- Georgian Super Cup: 2024

Ulsan HD

- K League: 2024

Individual

- Midfielder of the Year: 2023
- Team of the Season: 2023
