= 2024 Georgian Super Cup =

Football tournament in Georgia

Tournament details
- Host country: Georgia
- Dates: 28 June - 3 July 2024
- Teams: 4

Final positions
- Champions: Torpedo Kutaisi (3rd title)
- Runners-up: Dinamo Tbilisi

Tournament statistics
- Matches played: 4
- Goals scored: 16 (4 per match)

The 2024 Georgian Super Cup was the 23rd edition of the Georgian Super Cup, an annual football competition for clubs in the Georgian football league system that were successful in its major competitions in the preceding season. It was the second edition of the tournament to be played under the new format with four teams.

== Qualification ==
=== Qualified teams ===
The following four teams qualified for the tournament.

Team	Method of qualification	Appearance	Last appearance as	Years performance			
Team	Method of qualification	Appearance	Last appearance as	Winner(s)	Runners-up	Third	Fourth
Dinamo Batumi	2023 Erovnuli Liga winners	6th	2022 Erovnuli Liga runners-up	2	3	–	–
FC Iberia 1999	2023 Georgian Cup winners	3rd	2019 Georgian Cup Winners	1	1	–	–
Dinamo Tbilisi	2023 Erovnuli Liga runners-up	14th	2022 Erovnuli Liga Winners	9	4	–	–
Torpedo Kutaisi	2023 Erovnuli Liga third place	6th	2022 Georgian Cup Winners	2	2	1	–

== Matches ==
=== Bracket ===
Semi-finals
28 June 2024 – Tbilisi
FC Iberia 1999	0
Dinamo Tbilisi	2
28 June 2024 – Batumi
Dinamo Batumi	3(2)
Torpedo Kutaisi	3(3)

Final
3 July 2024 – Tbilisi
Dinamo Tbilisi	1
Torpedo Kutaisi	2
Third place
3 July 2024 – Batumi
Dinamo Batumi	3
FC Iberia 1999	2

=== Semi-finals ===
28 June 2024
20:00 (UTC+4)

FC Iberia 1999	0–2	Dinamo Tbilisi
		Okriashvili 42' (pen.); Lominadze 90+3'

David Petriashvili Stadium, Tbilisi

28 June 2024
21:00 (UTC+4)

Dinamo Batumi	3–3	Torpedo Kutaisi
Mamuchashvili 12'; Gudushauri 25', 83'		Johnsen 20', 73'; Jorginho 90+3'
Penalties
Mamuchashvili (penalty missed); Kharabadze (penalty missed); Mara (penalty scored); Gomis (penalty scored); Gudushauri (penalty missed)	2–3	(penalty scored) Johnsen; (penalty missed) Mandzhgaladze; (penalty scored) Pires; (penalty missed) Gigauri; (penalty scored) Arabidze

Adjarabet Arena, Batumi

=== Match for third place ===
3 July 2024
20:00 (UTC+4)

Dinamo Batumi	3–2	FC Iberia 1999

Adjarabet Arena, Batumi

=== Final ===
3 July 2024
21:00 (UTC+4)

Dinamo Tbilisi	1–2	Torpedo Kutaisi

David Petriashvili Stadium, Tbilisi

== See also ==
- 2024 Erovnuli Liga
- 2024 Georgian Cup
