= 2023 FC Dinamo Tbilisi season =

FC Dinamo Tbilisi
2023 season
- Chairman: Roman Pipia
- Manager: Giorgi Tchiabrishvili (until 4 August); Andrés Carrasco (from 5 August)
- Stadium: Boris Paichadze Dinamo Arena
- Erovnuli Liga: 2nd
- Georgian Cup: Quarterfinal vs Samgurali Tsqaltubo
- Super Cup: Winners
- UEFA Champions League: First qualifying round vs Astana
- UEFA Europa Conference League: Second qualifying round vs Ħamrun Spartans
- Top goalscorer: League: Zoran Marušić (17); All: Zoran Marušić (18)

The 2023 FC Dinamo Tbilisi season was the 35th successive season that FC Dinamo Tbilisi played in the top flight of Georgian football.

== Season events ==
On 7 January, Giorgi Kutsia joined Liepāja on a season-long loan deal.

On 24 January, Francis Nzaba joined Dinamo Tbilisi on a one-year loan deal.

On 31 January, Stanislav Bilenkyi joined Maccabi Netanya on loan until the summer transfer window.

On 21 February, Dinamo Tbilisi announced the loan signing of Giorgi Kharaishvili from Ferencváros until the summer.

On 11 March, Dinamo Tbilisi announced the signing of Luka Lakvekheliani from Mezőkövesdi on a one-year contract with the option of an additional two.

On 31 March, Levan Osikmashvili joined Torpedo Kutaisi on loan for the season.

On 16 June, Dinamo Tbilisi announced the signing of free-agent Gagi Margvelashvili on a contract until the end of 2025.

On 29 June, Dinamo Tbilisi announced that Vagner Gonçalves had joined Armenian Premier League club Pyunik on a year-long loan deal, whilst Stanislav Bilenkyi had made his loan move to Maccabi Netanya a permanent one. On the same day Giorgi Loria returned to Dinamo Tbilisi, signing a two-year contract.

On 10 July, Dinamo Tbilisi announced the signings of Moussa Sangare and Joseph Iyendjock, which both players signing two-year contracts with the option of an additional two years.

On 20 July, Luka Kutaladze joined Samgurali Tsqaltubo on loan for the remainder of the season.

On 25 July, Gabriel Sigua left Dinamo Tbilisi to sign permanently for Basel.

On 4 August, Dinamo Tbilisi announced that Giorgi Tchiabrishvili had left his role as Head Coach of the club by mutual agreement, with Andrés Carrasco being appointed as his replacement the following day.

On 16 August, Dinamo Tbilisi announced the signing of free-agent Vato Arveladze until the end of the season.

On 4 September, Dinamo Tbilisi announced the extension of Giorgi Kharaishvilis loan from Ferencváros for the remainder of the season, whilst the following day Giorgi Moistsrapishvili joined Beveren on loan for one year.

On 12 September, Dinamo Tbilisi announced that Jemal Tabidze had left the club after his contract was terminated by mutual agreement. The following day, 13 September, Dinamo Tbilisi announced the signing of free-agent Denis Bušnja on a contract until the end of 2025, and the signing of free-agent Cadete on a contract until the end of 2024.

On 22 September, Dinamo Tbilisi announced that Imran Oulad Omar had left the club after his contract was terminated by mutual agreement.

== Squad ==
As of match played 2 December 2023

No.	Name	Nationality	Position	Date of birth (age)	Signed from	Signed in	Contract ends	Apps.	Goals
Goalkeepers
1	Davit Kereselidze	(Georgia (country))	GK	19 August 1999 (aged 24)	Gagra	2022		22	0
17	Giorgi Loria	(Georgia (country))	GK	27 January 1986 (aged 37)	Anorthosis Famagusta	2023		266	0
37	Mikheil Makatsaria	(Georgia (country))	GK	11 June 2004 (aged 19)	Academy	2022		0	0
	Papuna Beruashvili	(Georgia (country))	GK	21 March 2004 (aged 19)	Academy	2022		0	0
Defenders
2	Nikoloz Mali	(Georgia (country))	DF	27 January 1999 (aged 24)	Saburtalo Tbilisi	2022		71	0
3	Aleksandre Kalandadze	(Georgia (country))	DF	9 May 2001 (aged 22)	Academy	2020	2024	71	3
4	Saba Khvadagiani	(Georgia (country))	DF	30 January 2001 (aged 22)	Academy	2021	2024	94	3
20	Temur Gognadze	(Georgia (country))	DF	10 August 2004 (aged 19)	Academy	2022		2	0
21	Luka Lakvekheliani	(Georgia (country))	DF	20 October 1998 (aged 25)	Mezőkövesdi	2023		21	0
24	Davit Kobouri	(Georgia (country))	DF	24 January 1998 (aged 25)	Academy	2015		200	3
26	Shota Kverenchkhiladze	(Georgia (country))	DF	30 October 2004 (aged 19)	Academy	2023		1	0
29	Nika Sikharulashvili	(Georgia (country))	DF	7 October 2003 (aged 20)	Academy	2023		1	0
30	Cadete	(Spain)	DF	24 June 1994 (aged 29)	Unattached	2023	2024	9	1
31	Giorgi Maisuradze	(Georgia (country))	DF	31 January 2002 (aged 21)	Academy	2021		48	2
33	Gagi Margvelashvili	(Georgia (country))	DF	30 October 1996 (aged 27)	Shkupi	2023	2025	4	0
34	Luka Latsabidze	(Georgia (country))	DF	18 March 2004 (aged 19)	Academy	2022		3	0
Midfielders
5	Anzor Mekvabishvili	(Georgia (country))	MF	5 June 2001 (aged 22)	Academy	2020	2024	113	8
6	Joseph Iyendjock	(Cameroon)	MF	29 May 2003 (aged 20)	Union Douala	2023	2024	1	0
12	Giorgi Kharaishvili	(Georgia (country))	MF	29 July 1996 (aged 27)	on loan from Ferencváros	2023	2023	38	8
16	Levan Osikmashvili	(Georgia (country))	MF	20 April 2002 (aged 21)	Academy	2022		45	0
22	Vato Arveladze	(Georgia (country))	MF	4 March 1998 (aged 25)	Unattached	2023	2023	1	0
25	Denis Bušnja	(Croatia)	MF	14 April 2000 (aged 23)	Unattached	2023	2025	13	1
27	Nikoloz Ugrekhelidze	(Georgia (country))	MF	15 August 2003 (aged 20)	Academy	2022		8	1
35	Luka Bubuteishvili	(Georgia (country))	MF	12 February 2006 (aged 17)	Academy	2023		2	0
40	Moussa Sangare	(Ivory Coast)	MF	21 February 2002 (aged 21)	Železiarne Podbrezová	2023	2024	5	1
Forwards
7	Davit Skhirtladze	(Georgia (country))	FW	16 March 1993 (aged 30)	Viborg	2021	2023 (+1)	82	26
14	Jaduli Iobashvili	(Georgia (country))	FW	1 January 2004 (aged 19)	Academy	2021	2024	10	1
18	Barnes Osei	(Ghana)	FW	8 January 1995 (aged 28)	Nea Salamis Famagusta	2021		81	11
23	Tornike Kirkitadze	(Georgia (country))	FW	23 July 1996 (aged 27)	Locomotive Tbilisi	2022	2023	48	5
28	Ousmane Camara	(Guinea)	FW	28 December 1998 (aged 24)	Vålerenga	2022		85	26
32	Zoran Marušić	(Serbia)	FW	29 November 1993 (aged 30)	Navbahor Namangan	2023		80	36
38	Vakhtang Salia	(Georgia (country))	FW	30 August 2007 (aged 16)	Academy	2023		3	0
39	Lasha Odisharia	(Georgia (country))	FW	23 October 2002 (aged 21)	Merani Martvili	2020		32	4
Players away on loan
6	Nodar Lominadze	(Georgia (country))	MF	4 April 2002 (aged 21)	Academy	2021		10	0
8	Giorgi Moistsrapishvili	(Georgia (country))	MF	29 September 2001 (aged 22)	Academy	2019	2024	69	13
21	Giorgi Kutsia	(Georgia (country))	MF	27 October 1999 (aged 24)	Academy	2017		119	6
22	Vagner Gonçalves	(Brazil)	MF	27 April 1996 (aged 27)	Shkëndija	2023		16	3
25	Tornike Morchiladze	(Georgia (country))	MF	10 January 2002 (aged 21)	Academy	2021	2024	29	1
30	Luka Kutaladze	(Georgia (country))	GK	27 April 2001 (aged 22)	Academy	2021		30	0
	Giorgi Gvishiani	(Georgia (country))	FW	19 November 2003 (aged 20)	Academy	2021	2024	0	0
Left during the season
13	Jemal Tabidze	(Georgia (country))	DF	18 March 1996 (aged 27)	Unattached	2022	2023	36	0
17	Francis Nzaba	(Republic of the Congo)	DF	17 July 2002 (aged 21)	on loan from İstanbul Başakşehir	2023		9	0
38	Gabriel Sigua	(Georgia (country))	MF	30 June 2005 (aged 18)	Academy	2022		31	5

== Transfers ==
=== In ===
Date	Position	Nationality	Name	From	Fee	Ref.
11 June 2023	DF	(Georgia (country))	Luka Lakvekheliani	Mezőkövesdi	Undisclosed	
16 June 2023	DF	(Georgia (country))	Gagi Margvelashvili	Unattached	Free	
29 June 2023	GK	(Georgia (country))	Giorgi Loria	Anorthosis Famagusta	Undisclosed	
10 July 2023	MF	(Cameroon)	Joseph Iyendjock	Union Douala	Undisclosed	
10 July 2023	MF	(Ivory Coast)	Moussa Sangare	Železiarne Podbrezová	Undisclosed	
16 August 2023	MF	(Georgia (country))	Vato Arveladze	Unattached	Free	
13 September 2023	DF	(Spain)	Cadete	Unattached	Free	
13 September 2023	MF	(Croatia)	Denis Bušnja	Unattached	Free	

=== Loans in ===
Date from	Position	Nationality	Name	From	Date to	Ref.
24 January 2023	DF	(Republic of the Congo)	Francis Nzaba	İstanbul Başakşehir	31 December 2023	
21 February 2023	MF	(Georgia (country))	Giorgi Kharaishvili	Ferencváros	31 December 2023	

=== Out ===
Date	Position	Nationality	Name	To	Fee	Ref.
29 June 2023	FW	(Ukraine)	Stanislav Bilenkyi	Maccabi Netanya	Undisclosed	
25 July 2023	MF	(Georgia (country))	Gabriel Sigua	Basel	Undisclosed	

=== Loans out ===
Date from	Position	Nationality	Name	To	Date to	Ref.
1 January 2023	MF	(Georgia (country))	Giorgi Gvishiani	Samtredia	31 January 2023	
8 July 2022	GK	(Georgia (country))	Papuna Beruashvili	Sporting CP	30 June 2023	
7 January 2023	MF	(Georgia (country))	Giorgi Kutsia	Liepāja	31 December 2023	
31 January 2023	FW	(Ukraine)	Stanislav Bilenkyi	Maccabi Netanya	29 June 2023	
31 March 2023	MF	(Georgia (country))	Levan Osikmashvili	Torpedo Kutaisi	30 June 2023	
29 June 2023	MF	(Brazil)	Vagner Gonçalves	Pyunik	31 May 2024	
20 July 2023	GK	(Georgia (country))	Luka Kutaladze	Samgurali Tsqaltubo	31 December 2023	
5 September 2023	MF	(Georgia (country))	Giorgi Moistsrapishvili	Beveren	30 June 2024	
6 September 2023	MF	(Georgia (country))	Giorgi Gvishiani	Tiszakécske	31 December 2023	

=== Released ===
Date	Position	Nationality	Name	Joined	Date	Ref.
22 January 2023	FW	(Belarus)	Dmitry Antilevsky	BATE Borisov		
12 September 2023	DF	(Georgia (country))	Jemal Tabidze	Panetolikos	18 January 2024	
22 September 2023	MF	(Netherlands)	Imran Oulad Omar	Hapoel Be'er Sheva		
31 December 2023	MF	(Georgia (country))	Otar Aptsiauri	Gagra	1 January 2024	
31 December 2023	MF	(Georgia (country))	Giorgi Kutsia	Liepāja	1 January 2024	

== Friendlies ==
15 January 2023	Dnipro-1	3 – 3	Dinamo Tbilisi	Turkey
18:00 GET (UTC+4)	Dovbyk 35'; Pidlepenets 40'; Rubchynskyi 41'; Klymenchuk (yellow card) 72'; Tankovskyi (red card) 77'	Report	Moistsrapishvili 3'; Kirkitadze 9'; Ugrekhelidze (yellow card) 37'; Mekvabishvili 75'; Mali (yellow card) 86'

18 January 2023	Lokomotiv Plovdiv	0 – 2	Dinamo Tbilisi	Turkey
16:30 GET (UTC+4)		Report	Omar 74'; Khvadagiani 90+1'

22 January 2023	Dinamo Tbilisi	2 – 3	Red Star Belgrade	Turkey
18:00 GET (UTC+4)	Omar 35'; Gonçalves 37'	Report	Pešić 31', 53'; Ivanić 75'

28 January 2023	Ludogorets Razgrad	1 – 2	Dinamo Tbilisi	Turkey
18:15 GET (UTC+4)	Tissera 14' (pen.); Despodov 88'	Report	Omar 76'

1 February 2023	Žalgiris	0 – 0	Dinamo Tbilisi	Turkey
18:30 GET (UTC+4)		Report

5 February 2023	Dinamo Tbilisi	0 – 2	Shkupi	Turkey
GET (UTC+4)		Report	Danfa 11'; Adetunji 36'

8 February 2023	Dinamo Tbilisi	1 – 0	Levadia Tallinn	Turkey
18:30 GET (UTC+4)	Skhirtladze 79'	Report

9 February 2023	Riga	1 – 4	Dinamo Tbilisi	Turkey
18:30 GET (UTC+4)	Ramírez 19', 27'; Kutaladze 36' (o.g.); Soisalo 44'	Report	Skhirtladze 56'

== Competitions ==
=== Overview ===
Competition	First match	Last match	Starting round	Final position	Record							
Competition	First match	Last match	Starting round	Final position	Pld	W	D	L	GF	GA	GD	Win %
Erovnuli Liga	25 February 2023	2 December 2023	Matchday 1	Runners-up	36	21	8	7	93	49	+44	58.33
Georgian Cup	29 July 2023	25 October 2023	Fourth round	Quarterfinal	2	1	1	0	2	1	+1	50.00
Super Cup	30 June 2023	4 July 2023	Semifinal	Winners	2	0	2	0	2	2	+0	0.00
UEFA Champions League	12 July 2023	19 July 2023	First qualifying round	First qualifying round	2	0	1	1	2	3	−1	0.00
UEFA Europa Conference League	25 July 2023	3 August 2023	Second qualifying round	Second qualifying round	2	0	0	2	1	3	−2	0.00
Total					44	22	12	10	100	58	+42	50.00

Last updated: 2 December 2023
Source: Competitions

=== Super Cup ===
30 June 2023 Semifinal	Dinamo Tbilisi	1 – 1 (4 – 2 p)	Dila Gori	Tbilisi
20:00 GET (UTC+4)	Kharaishvili (yellow card) 9'; Osei (yellow card) 48'; Omar 72'; Maisuradze (yellow card) 88'	Report	Parulava (yellow card) 25'; Kovtalyuk (yellow card) 38'; Sardalishvili (yellow card) 81'; Tevzadze (yellow card) 83'; Gomis 90+4'	Stadium: Mikheil Meskhi Stadium; Referee: Irakli Kvirikashvili
	Penalties
	Tabidze (penalty scored); Kharaishvili (penalty scored); Osei (penalty scored); Iobashvili (penalty scored)		(penalty missed) Santos; (penalty scored) Chiteishvili; (penalty scored) Gomis; (penalty missed) Sardalishvili

4 July 2023 Final	Dinamo Tbilisi	1 – 1 (4 – 3 p)	Dinamo Batumi	Tbilisi
20:00 GET (UTC+4)	Skhirtladze (yellow card) 58'; Sigua 77'	Report	Flamarion 25'; Balić (yellow card) 90+3'	Stadium: Boris Paichadze Dinamo Arena; Referee: Davit Kharitonashvili
	Penalties
	Skhirtladze (penalty missed); Camara (penalty missed); Kharaishvili (penalty scored); Moistsrapishvili (penalty scored); Maisuradze (penalty scored); Sigua (penalty scored)		(penalty missed) Kobakhidze; (penalty scored) Mamuchashvili; (penalty scored) Zaria; (penalty missed) Mosiashvili; (penalty scored) Flamarion; (penalty missed) Kharebava

=== Erovnuli Liga ===
==== Results summary ====
Overall								Home						Away					
Pld	W	D	L	GF	GA	GD	Pts	W	D	L	GF	GA	GD	W	D	L	GF	GA	GD
36	21	8	7	93	49	+44	71	11	3	4	48	22	+26	10	5	3	45	27	+18

Last updated: 2 December 2023.
Source: See Results

==== Results by round ====
Round	1	2	3	4	5	6	7	8	9	10	11	12	13	14	15	16	17	18	19	20	21	22	23	24	25	26	27	28	29	30	31	32	33	34	35	36
Ground	A	H	A	H	A	A	H	A	H	H	A	H	A	H	H	A	H	A	A	H	A	H	A	A	H	A	H	H	A	H	A	H	H	A	H	A
Result	W	W	W	W	D	W	W	D	L	L	W	D	L	W	D	W	L	L	W	W	W	W	D	W	D	D	W	W	L	L	W	W	W	D	W	W
Position																																				

Source: See Results
A = Away; H = Home; W = Win; D = Draw; L = Loss

==== Results ====
25 February 2023 1	Dila Gori	1 – 2	Dinamo Tbilisi	Gori
19:00 GET (UTC+4)	Tsetshtladze (yellow card) 14'; Gale 40'; Tevzadze (red card) 80'	Report	Mali (yellow card) 2'; Mekvabishvili (yellow card) 20'; Tabidze (yellow card) 27' (yellow-red card) 54'; Camara 35'; Kirkitadze (yellow card) 45+1'; Skhirtladze 53'; Kalandadze (yellow card) 61'	Stadium: Tengiz Burjanadze Stadium; Referee: G.Kikacheishvili

4 March 2023 2	Dinamo Tbilisi	4 – 0	Samtredia	Gori
19:00 GET (UTC+4)	Sigua 10'; Moistsrapishvili 14' (pen.); Omar 81'; Mekvabishvili (yellow card) 90'; Marušić 90+1'	Report	Robakidze (yellow card) 28'; Natchkebia (yellow card) 75'	Stadium: Tengiz Burjanadze Stadium; Referee: G.Kruashvili

8 March 2023 3	Gagra	3 – 5	Dinamo Tbilisi	Tbilisi
14:30 GET (UTC+4)	Markondele 38'; Shonia 74', 81'	Report	Omar 9'; Tabidze (yellow card) 32'; Camara 43', 55'; Mali (yellow card) 45+1'; Marušić 47'; Sigua 48'	Stadium: Ilia Kokaia Football Center; Referee: I.Serkhadze

13 March 2023 4	Dinamo Tbilisi	2 – 0	Samgurali Tsqaltubo	Gori
19:00 GET (UTC+4)	Mekvabishvili (yellow card) 37'; Moistsrapishvili 69' (pen.); Kharaishvili 90+4'	Report	Patarkatsishvili (yellow card) 32'; N.Khorkheli (yellow card) 41'; Burjanadze (yellow card) 74'; Jeferson (yellow card) 89'; Maisashvili (yellow card) 90+3'3	Stadium: Tengiz Burjanadze Stadium; Referee: I.Kvirikashvili

18 March 2023 5	Telavi	2 – 2	Dinamo Tbilisi	Telavi
18:00 GET (UTC+4)	Piranashvili 44'; Ashortia 66'	Report	Sigua 14'; Camara 34'	Stadium: Municipal Stadium; Referee: D.Kharitonashvili

2 April 2023 6	Shukura Kobuleti	1 – 2	Dinamo Tbilisi	Batumi
14:00 GET (UTC+4)	Apkhazava 2'; Janelidze (yellow card) 75'	Report	Kobouri 32'; Kharaishvili (yellow card) 61'; Sigua (yellow card) 88'; Marušić 90+5'	Stadium: Johnny Bakuridze Sports Base Stadium; Referee: G.Avazashvili

8 April 2023 7	Dinamo Tbilisi	2 – 1	Torpedo Kutaisi	Gori
20:00 GET (UTC+4)	Omar 45+2'; Osei (yellow card) 65'; Gonçalves 82'; Ugrekhelidze (yellow card) 87'	Report	Mandzhgaladze 78'; Kacharava (yellow card) 90+6'; Nadaraia (yellow card) 90+6'; Faleye (yellow card) 90+6'	Stadium: Tengiz Burjanadze Stadium; Referee: G.Kruashvili

12 April 2023 8	Dinamo Batumi	2 – 2	Dinamo Tbilisi	Batumi
20:00 GET (UTC+4)	Gudushauri 16'; Flamarion 24'; Altunashvili (yellow card) 40' (yellow-red card) 45+1'	Report	Omar 41'; Tabidze (yellow card) 59'; Lakvekheliani (yellow card) 72'; Skhirtladze 75'; Khvadagiani (yellow card) 78'	Stadium: Adjarabet Arena; Referee: A.Nonikashvili

21 April 2023 9	Dinamo Tbilisi	1 – 3	Saburtalo Tbilisi	Gori
21:00 GET (UTC+4)	Marušić 22'; Nzaba (yellow card) 57'; Tabidze (red card) 68'; Omar (yellow card) 78'	Report	Tabatadze 55' (yellow card) 82'; Nonikashvili (yellow card) 63'; G.Mamageishvili 70' (yellow card) 83'; Sylla 90+2'	Stadium: Tengiz Burjanadze Stadium; Referee: G.Kikacheishvili

25 April 2023 10	Dinamo Tbilisi	1 – 2	Dila Gori	Tbilisi
20:00 GET (UTC+4)	Kalandadze (yellow card) 20'; Ugrekhelidze (yellow card) 53'; Marušić 63'	Report	Kobouri 54' (o.g.); Kovtalyuk 61'	Stadium: Boris Paichadze Dinamo Arena; Referee: I.Kvirikashvili

30 April 2023 11	Samtredia	0 – 2	Dinamo Tbilisi	Samtredia
20:00 GET (UTC+4)	Papunashvili (yellow card) 48'	Report	Maisuradze (yellow card) 27'; Marušić 34', 58'	Stadium: Erosi Manjgaladze Stadium; Referee: A.Nonikashvili

6 May 2023 12	Dinamo Tbilisi	0 – 0	Gagra	Gori
20:00 GET (UTC+4)	Nzaba (yellow card) 21'	Report	Nozadze (yellow card) 55'; Boutrif (yellow card) 80'; Kakubava (yellow card) 83'; Vorobey (yellow card) 90+6'	Stadium: Tengiz Burjanadze Stadium; Referee: K.Giorgadze

10 May 2023 13	Samgurali Tsqaltubo	2 – 1	Dinamo Tbilisi	Tsqaltubo
16:00 GET (UTC+4)	N.Khorkheli 42'; Jeferson (yellow card) 49'; Gomez (yellow card) 60'; Basheleishvili (yellow card) 69'; Chikhradze 78'; Arthur (yellow card) 84'; Verulidze (yellow card) 90+5'	Report	Kutaladze (red card) 11'; Omar (yellow card) 43' (goal) 57'	Stadium: 26 May Stadium; Referee: G.Kruashvili

14 May 2023 14	Dinamo Tbilisi	6 – 1	Telavi	Gori
20:00 GET (UTC+4)	Omar 20'; Lakvekheliani (yellow card) 25'; Maisuradze 27'; Camara 34'; Gonçalves 46'; Kalandadze 62' (yellow card) 78'; Skhirtladze 81'	Report	Ashortia (yellow card) 25' (goal) 84'	Stadium: Tengiz Burjanadze Stadium; Referee: I.Kvirikashvili

20 May 2023 15	Dinamo Tbilisi	4 – 4	Shukura Kobuleti	Gori
20:00 GET (UTC+4)	Omar 3'; Kalandadze 6'; Moistsrapishvili (yellow card) 30'; Kharaishvili 52'; Maisuradze (yellow card) 75'; Gonçalves 83'	Report	Sardalishvili 14', 38'; Mujiri 29', 84' (yellow card) 59'; Andronikashvili (yellow card) 90+4'	Stadium: Tengiz Burjanadze Stadium; Referee: A.Nonikashvili

24 May 2023 16	Torpedo Kutaisi	2 – 3	Dinamo Tbilisi	Samtredia
16:30 GET (UTC+4)	Kukhianidze 62'; Bugridze 66'; Mandzhgaladze (yellow card) 80'; Mchedlishvili (yellow card) 90+10'	Report	Omar 4', 49' (yellow card) 76'; Osei (yellow card) 15'; Maisuradze (yellow card) 32'; Tabidze (yellow card) 85'; Camara 90+11' (pen.)	Stadium: Erosi Manjgaladze Stadium; Referee: J.Khorava

28 May 2023 17	Dinamo Tbilisi	1 – 2	Dinamo Batumi	Tbilisi
21:00 GET (UTC+4)	Skhirtladze 45+2'; Osei (yellow card) 60'	Report	Teidi 30' (yellow card) 36'; Bidzinashvili (yellow card) 55'; Flamarion 61'; Chabradze (yellow card) 90+6'	Stadium: Boris Paichadze Dinamo Arena; Referee: G.Kikacheishvili

1 June 2023 18	Saburtalo Tbilisi	2 – 1	Dinamo Tbilisi	Rustavi
19:00 GET (UTC+4)	Tabatadze (yellow card) 42' (goal) 72' (pen.); Kapanadze (yellow card) 49'; Nonikashvili 88' (pen.)	Report	Tabidze (yellow card) 17'; Osei (yellow card) 50'; Khvadagiani (yellow card) 58'; Maisuradze 90+2'	Stadium: GFF Technical Centre; Referee: G.Kruashvili

29 August 2023 19	Dila Gori	0 – 3	Dinamo Tbilisi	Gori
21:00 GET (UTC+4)	Dzotsenidze (yellow card) 13'; Mzwakali (yellow card) 70'	Report	Kalandadze (yellow card) 8'; Kharaishvili (yellow card) 24' (goal) 88'; Mekvabishvili (yellow card) 49'; Camara 61'; Skhirtladze 90+2'	Stadium: Tengiz Burjanadze Stadium; Referee: I.Kvirikashvili

5 June 2023 20	Dinamo Tbilisi	3 – 0	Samtredia	Tbilisi
20:00 GET (UTC+4)	Moistsrapishvili 59' (pen.), 86'; Odisharia 90+3'	Report	Abuladze (yellow card) 58'; Khmaladze (yellow card) 76'	Stadium: Boris Paichadze Dinamo Arena; Referee: D.Kharitonashvili

13 August 2023 21	Gagra	1 – 6	Dinamo Tbilisi	Tbilisi
20:00 GET (UTC+4)	Museliani 27'	Report	Kozlenko 15' (o.g.); Odisharia (yellow card) 16'; Omar 33', 44', 45+1'; Kharaishvili (yellow card) 36'; Skhirtladze 57', 64'; Osei (yellow card) 58'; Maisuradze (yellow card) 68'	Stadium: David Petriashvili Arena; Referee: A.Optional

19 August 2023 22	Dinamo Tbilisi	5 – 2	Samgurali Tsqaltubo	Tbilisi
20:00 GET (UTC+4)	Omar 3'; Marušić 13', 74', 90+1'; Kalandadze (yellow card) 71'; Skhirtladze 72' (yellow card) 90+4'; Osei (yellow card) 77'; Lakvekheliani (yellow card) 90+4'	Report	Kalandarishvili (penalty missed) 7'; Kagayama 42'; Maisashvili (yellow card) 45'; N.Khorkheli 61' (yellow card) 90+4'; Arthur (yellow card) 89'; L.Khorkheli (yellow card) 90+4'	Stadium: Boris Paichadze Dinamo Arena; Referee: G.Kikacheishvili

25 August 2023 23	Telavi	2 – 2	Dinamo Tbilisi	Telavi
18:00 GET (UTC+4)	Désiré 19'; Menich (yellow card) 36'; Parkinashvili (yellow card) 45+2'; Rukhadze 58'; Guti (yellow card) 66'; Begić (yellow card) 67'; Jeferson (penalty missed) 90+2'	Report	Kharaishvili 29' (pen.); Skhirtladze (yellow card) 66'; Latsabidze (yellow card) 67'; Sangare 81'	Stadium: Municipal Stadium; Referee: G.Kruashvili

2 September 2023 24	Shukura Kobuleti	2 – 3	Dinamo Tbilisi	Tbilisi
19:00 GET (UTC+4)	Ananidze 30'; Verulidze 45+1' (yellow card) 53'; Jincharadze (yellow card) 62'	Report	Camara 46'; Skhirtladze 54' (pen.); Khvadagiani (yellow card) 62'; Iobashvili 90+4'	Stadium: Ilia Kokaia Football Center; Referee: I.Serkhadze

16 September 2023 25	Dinamo Tbilisi	1 – 1	Torpedo Kutaisi	Tbilisi
21:00 GET (UTC+4)	Osei (yellow card) 34'; Skhirtladze (yellow card) 38'; Camara 41'	Report	Bugridze 53'; Sandokhadze (yellow card) 67'; Monteiro (yellow card) 74'; Mandzhgaladze (yellow card) 90+6'	Stadium: Boris Paichadze Dinamo Arena; Referee: G.Kruashvili

24 September 2023 26	Dinamo Batumi	2 – 2	Dinamo Tbilisi	Batumi
21:00 GET (UTC+4)	Mamuchashvili 4' (penalty missed) 67'; Zaria (yellow card) 13'; Gudushauri 73'	Report	Khvadagiani (yellow card) 28'; Bušnja (yellow card) 33'; Cadete 37'; Kharaishvili 52'; Loria (yellow card) 66'; Osei (yellow card) 90+4'	Stadium: Adjarabet Arena; Referee: G.Kikacheishvili

29 September 2023 27	Dinamo Tbilisi	1 – 0	Saburtalo Tbilisi	Gori
20:00 GET (UTC+4)	Kalandadze (yellow card) 18'; Mekvabishvili (yellow card) 30'; Bušnja 37'; Cadete (yellow card) 43'; Odisharia (yellow card) 82'	Report	G.Mamageishvili (yellow card) 57'; Tabatadze (yellow card) 71'	Stadium: Tengiz Burjanadze Stadium; Referee: I.Kvirikashvili

3 October 2023 28	Dinamo Tbilisi	3 – 1	Dila Gori	Tbilisi
20:00 GET (UTC+4)	Kharaishvili 11'; Mekvabishvili 18'; Camara 24'; Osei (yellow card) 26'; Iobashvili (yellow card) 71'	Report	Kovtalyuk (yellow card) 7'; Gagnidze 72'	Stadium: Boris Paichadze Dinamo Arena; Referee: I.Kvirikashvili

7 October 2023 29	Samtredia	3 – 2	Dinamo Tbilisi	Samtredia
15:00 GET (UTC+4)	Natchkebia 2'; Khmaladze (yellow card) 23'; Mishov 61'; Pavišić (yellow card) 79'; Injgia 81' (yellow card) 81'	Report	Maisuradze (yellow card) 39'; Kalandadze 56' (yellow card) 88'; Cadete (yellow card) 87'; Mekvabishvili 90+6'	Stadium: Erosi Manjgaladze Stadium; Referee: A.Optional

21 October 2023 30	Dinamo Tbilisi	0 – 1	Gagra	Tbilisi
19:00 GET (UTC+4)	Cadete (yellow card) 54'; Osei (yellow card) 66'; Arveladze (yellow card) 90+4'; Kalandadze (yellow card) 90+6'	Report	Mamatsashvili 32'; Vorobey (yellow card) 73'; Jangidze (yellow card) 90+2'; Claudinei (yellow card) 90+6'	Stadium: Boris Paichadze Dinamo Arena; Referee: G.Avazashvili

29 October 2023 31	Samgurali Tsqaltubo	0 – 2	Dinamo Tbilisi	Zestaponi
15:00 GET (UTC+4)	Bull (yellow card) 49'; Sulakvelidze (yellow card) 57'	Report	Marušić 36'; Camara 84'; Ugrekhelidze (yellow card) 89'	Stadium: David Abashidze Stadium; Referee: G.Kruashvili

4 November 2023 32	Dinamo Tbilisi	4 – 0	Telavi	Tbilisi
19:00 GET (UTC+4)	Camara 11'; Maisuradze (yellow card) 33'; Kharaishvili 49'; Marušić 83' (pen.), 90+1'; Cadete (yellow card) 88'	Report	Begić (yellow card) 81'; Goshteliani (yellow card) 88'	Stadium: Boris Paichadze Dinamo Arena; Referee: G.Kikacheishvili

10 November 2023 33	Dinamo Tbilisi	4 – 2	Shukura Kobuleti	Tbilisi
19:00 GET (UTC+4)	Skhirtladze 4'; Camara 27'; Khvadagiani 45+3'; Marušić 90' (yellow card) 90+1'	Report	Gogolashvili 10'; Chakvetadze (yellow card) 45+3'; Robakidze (yellow card) 46'; Apkhazava 52'	Stadium: Boris Paichadze Dinamo Arena; Referee: I.Kvirikashvili

24 November 2023 34	Torpedo Kutaisi	2 – 2	Dinamo Tbilisi	Kutaisi
19:00 GET (UTC+4)	Mandzhgaladze (yellow card) 12'; Chichinadze (yellow card) 37'; Shergelashvili 39'; Arabidze 58'; Ekongolo (yellow card) 90+6'	Report	Mekvabishvili (yellow card) 29'; Kalandadze (yellow card) 63'; Marušić 80'; Odisharia 90+2'	Stadium: Ramaz Shengelia Stadium; Referee: G.Kruashvili

28 November 2023 35	Dinamo Tbilisi	6 – 2	Dinamo Batumi	Tbilisi
19:00 GET (UTC+4)	Khvadagiani 8'; Bidzinashvili 16' (o.g.); Marušić 19'; Kharaishvili 22'; Skhirtladze 34'; Odisharia (yellow card) 52'; Camara 67'	Report	Flamarion 3'; Jakobsen 36'; Mosiashvili (yellow card) 58'	Stadium: Boris Paichadze Dinamo Arena; Referee: A.Nonikashvili

2 December 2023 36	Saburtalo Tbilisi	0 – 3	Dinamo Tbilisi	Tbilisi
19:30 GET (UTC+4)	G.Mamageishvili (yellow card) 33'; Nonikashvili (yellow card) 84'	Report	Khvadagiani (yellow card) 14'; Bušnja (yellow card) 51'; Skhirtladze 52'; Marušić 66'; Ugrekhelidze (yellow card) 79' (goal) 90+2'; Kalandadze (yellow card) 81'	Stadium: David Petriashvili Stadium; Referee: G.Varidze

==== League table ====
Pos	Team	Pld	W	D	L	GF	GA	GD	Pts	Qualification or relegation
1	Dinamo Batumi (C)	36	21	11	4	83	41	+42	74	Qualification for the Champions League first qualifying round
2	Dinamo Tbilisi	36	21	8	7	93	49	+44	71	Qualification for the Conference League first qualifying round
3	Torpedo Kutaisi	36	16	12	8	55	37	+18	60	Qualification for the Conference League first qualifying round
4	Dila Gori	36	17	9	10	56	39	+17	60	
5	Samgurali Tsqaltubo	36	16	9	11	53	51	+2	57	

Source: Erovnuli Liga, Soccerway
Rules for classification: 1) Points; 2) Head-to-head points; 3) Head-to-head goal difference; 4) Head-to-head goals scored; 5) Head-to-head away goals scored (only if two teams); 6) Goal difference; 7) Goals scored.
(C) Champions

=== Georgian Cup ===
29 July 2023 Fourth round	Locomotive Tbilisi	0 – 1	Dinamo Tbilisi	Tbilisi
20:00 GET (UTC+4)		Report	Osei 72'	Stadium: Mikheil Meskhi Stadium; Referee: G.Kruashvili

25 October 2023 Quarterfinal	Samgurali Tsqaltubo	1 – 1 (a.e.t.) (5 – 3 p)	Dinamo Tbilisi	Tsqaltubo
14:30 GET (UTC+4)	Dartsmelia 40'; Sulakvelidze (yellow card) 45+1'; Yikpe (yellow card) 66'; L.Khorkheli (yellow card) 81'	Report	Kalandadze (yellow card) 48'; Odisharia 50'; Mekvabishvili (yellow card) 69'; Kharaishvili (yellow card) 75'	Stadium: 26 May Stadium; Referee: B.Ninua
	Penalties
	Dartsmelia (penalty scored); Balanyuk (penalty scored); Patarkatsishvili (penalty scored); Gomez (penalty scored); Verulidze (penalty scored)		(penalty missed) Kharaishvili; (penalty scored) Mekvabishvili; (penalty scored) Kobouri; (penalty scored) Camara

=== UEFA Champions League ===
==== Qualifying rounds ====
12 July 2023 First qualifying round 1st leg	Astana (Kazakhstan)	1 – 1	(Georgia (country)) Dinamo Tbilisi	Astana, Kazakhstan
18:00 GET (UTC+4)	Aymbetov 11'	Report	Kalandadze (yellow card) 51'; Sigua 57'	Stadium: Astana Arena; Attendance: 27,328; Referee: Christian-Petru Ciochirca (Austria)

19 July 2023 First qualifying round 2nd leg	Dinamo Tbilisi (Georgia (country))	1 – 2 (2 – 3 agg.)	(Kazakhstan) Astana	Tbilisi, Georgia
20:00 GET (UTC+4)	Camara 22'	Report	Beysebekov 50'; Darboe 51'	Stadium: Boris Paichadze Dinamo Arena; Attendance: 10,736; Referee: Stuart Attwell (England)

=== UEFA Europa Conference League ===
==== Qualifying rounds ====
25 July 2023 Second qualifying round 1st leg	Ħamrun Spartans (Malta)	2 – 1	(Georgia (country)) Dinamo Tbilisi	Ta' Qali, Malta
22:00 GET (UTC+4)	Elionay (yellow card) 39'; Eder (yellow card) 59'; Prša (yellow card) 74'; Mbong 81', 90+8' (yellow card) 90+9'; Jonny (yellow card) 90+2'	Report	Tabidze (yellow card) 13'; Marušić 60'; Kharaishvili (yellow card) 63'; Loria (yellow card) 67'; Omar (yellow card) 70'; Margvelashvili (yellow card) 80'	Stadium: Centenary Stadium; Attendance: 1,319; Referee: Miloš Gigovic (Bosnia and Herzegovina)
Note: Ħamrun Spartans played their home match at the Centenary Stadium in Ta' Qali, instead of their regular stadium, Victor Tedesco Stadium, in Hamrun, which did not meet UEFA requirements.

3 August 2023 Second qualifying round 2nd leg	Dinamo Tbilisi (Georgia (country))	0 – 1 (1 – 3 agg.)	(Malta) Ħamrun Spartans	Tbilisi, Georgia
20:00 GET (UTC+4)	Osei (yellow card) 37'	Report	Đuranović 45+2' (red card) 46'; Marchetti (yellow card) 89'	Stadium: Boris Paichadze Dinamo Arena; Attendance: 2,500; Referee: Viktor Shimusik (Belarus)

== Squad statistics ==
As of match played 2 December 2023

=== Appearances and goals ===
No.	Pos	Nat	Player	Total		Erovnuli Liga		Georgian Cup		Super Cup		UEFA Champions League		UEFA Europa Conference League	
No.	Pos	Nat	Player	Apps	Goals	Apps	Goals	Apps	Goals	Apps	Goals	Apps	Goals	Apps	Goals
1	GK	(Georgia (country)) GEO	Davit Kereselidze	14	0	13+1	0	0	0	0	0	0	0	0	0
2	DF	(Georgia (country)) GEO	Nikoloz Mali	30	0	19+4	0	1	0	2	0	2	0	0+2	0
3	DF	(Georgia (country)) GEO	Aleksandre Kalandadze	30	3	20+4	3	1+1	0	0	0	1+1	0	2	0
4	DF	(Georgia (country)) GEO	Saba Khvadagiani	38	2	25+6	2	1+1	0	1	0	0+2	0	2	0
5	MF	(Georgia (country)) GEO	Anzor Mekvabishvili	29	2	21+2	2	2	0	1	0	1	0	2	0
6	MF	(Cameroon) CMR	Joseph Iyendjock	1	0	0+1	0	0	0	0	0	0	0	0	0
7	FW	(Georgia (country)) GEO	Davit Skhirtladze	43	12	28+8	12	1	0	2	0	2	0	1+1	0
12	MF	(Georgia (country)) GEO	Giorgi Kharaishvili	38	8	23+8	8	1	0	2	0	2	0	2	0
14	FW	(Georgia (country)) GEO	Jaduli Iobashvili	9	1	0+7	1	0+1	0	0+1	0	0	0	0	0
16	MF	(Georgia (country)) GEO	Levan Osikmashvili	10	0	0+4	0	1+1	0	1+1	0	0+1	0	0+1	0
17	GK	(Georgia (country)) GEO	Giorgi Loria	21	0	13	0	2	0	2	0	2	0	2	0
18	FW	(Ghana) GHA	Barnes Osei	31	1	18+5	0	1+1	1	2	0	2	0	2	0
20	DF	(Georgia (country)) GEO	Temur Gognadze	1	0	0+1	0	0	0	0	0	0	0	0	0
21	DF	(Georgia (country)) GEO	Luka Lakvekheliani	21	0	8+9	0	1	0	1+1	0	0	0	0+1	0
22	MF	(Georgia (country)) GEO	Vato Arveladze	1	0	0+1	0	0	0	0	0	0	0	0	0
23	FW	(Georgia (country)) GEO	Tornike Kirkitadze	11	0	7+2	0	0+1	0	0+1	0	0	0	0	0
24	DF	(Georgia (country)) GEO	Davit Kobouri	35	1	23+7	1	1+1	0	1	0	1	0	1	0
25	MF	(Croatia) CRO	Denis Bušnja	13	1	8+4	1	1	0	0	0	0	0	0	0
26	DF	(Georgia (country)) GEO	Shota Kverenchkhiladze	1	0	0+1	0	0	0	0	0	0	0	0	0
27	MF	(Georgia (country)) GEO	Nikoloz Ugrekhelidze	8	1	1+7	1	0	0	0	0	0	0	0	0
28	FW	(Guinea) GUI	Ousmane Camara	43	15	34+1	14	1+1	0	2	0	2	1	2	0
29	DF	(Georgia (country)) GEO	Nika Sikharulashvili	1	0	0+1	0	0	0	0	0	0	0	0	0
30	DF	(Spain) ESP	Cadete	9	1	8	1	1	0	0	0	0	0	0	0
31	DF	(Georgia (country)) GEO	Giorgi Maisuradze	33	2	17+8	2	1+1	0	0+2	0	0+2	0	2	0
32	FW	(Serbia) SRB	Zoran Marušić	38	18	21+12	17	1	0	1	0	0+1	0	1+1	1
33	DF	(Georgia (country)) GEO	Gagi Margvelashvili	4	0	0	0	1	0	0	0	2	0	0+1	0
34	DF	(Georgia (country)) GEO	Luka Latsabidze	2	0	1+1	0	0	0	0	0	0	0	0	0
35	MF	(Georgia (country)) GEO	Luka Bubuteishvili	2	0	0+2	0	0	0	0	0	0	0	0	0
38	FW	(Georgia (country)) GEO	Vakhtang Salia	3	0	0+3	0	0	0	0	0	0	0	0	0
39	FW	(Georgia (country)) GEO	Lasha Odisharia	24	3	8+12	2	2	1	0+1	0	0	0	0+1	0
40	MF	(Ivory Coast) CIV	Moussa Sangare	5	1	1+3	1	0	0	0	0	0+1	0	0	0
Players away from Dinamo Tbilisi on loan:
8	MF	(Georgia (country)) GEO	Giorgi Moistsrapishvili	21	4	7+10	4	0	0	0+1	0	0+1	0	0+2	0
22	MF	(Brazil) BRA	Vagner Gonçalves	16	3	10+6	3	0	0	0	0	0	0	0	0
25	MF	(Georgia (country)) GEO	Tornike Morchiladze	1	0	0+1	0	0	0	0	0	0	0	0	0
30	GK	(Georgia (country)) GEO	Luka Kutaladze	10	0	10	0	0	0	0	0	0	0	0	0
Players who left Dinamo Tbilisi during the season:
11	MF	(Netherlands) NED	Imran Oulad Omar	28	14	17+4	13	1	0	2	1	2	0	2	0
13	DF	(Georgia (country)) GEO	Jemal Tabidze	21	0	14+2	0	0	0	2	0	2	0	1	0
17	DF	(Republic of the Congo) CGO	Francis Nzaba	9	0	9	0	0	0	0	0	0	0	0	0
38	MF	(Georgia (country)) GEO	Gabriel Sigua	19	5	10+6	3	0	0	0+1	1	1+1	1	0	0

=== Goal scorers ===
Place	Position	Nation	Number	Name	Erovnuli Liga	Georgian Cup	Super Cup	UEFA Champions League	UEFA Europa Conference League	Total
1	FW	(Serbia)	32	Zoran Marušić	17	0	0	0	1	18
2	FW	(Guinea)	28	Ousmane Camara	14	0	0	1	0	15
3	MF	(Netherlands)	11	Imran Oulad Omar	13	0	1	0	0	14
4	FW	(Georgia (country))	7	Davit Skhirtladze	12	0	0	0	0	12
5	FW	(Georgia (country))	12	Giorgi Kharaishvili	8	0	0	0	0	8
6	MF	(Georgia (country))	38	Gabriel Sigua	3	0	1	1	0	5
7	FW	(Georgia (country))	8	Giorgi Moistsrapishvili	4	0	0	0	0	4
8	FW	(Georgia (country))	3	Aleksandre Kalandadze	3	0	0	0	0	3
8	MF	(Brazil)	22	Vagner Gonçalves	3	0	0	0	0	3
8	FW	(Georgia (country))	39	Lasha Odisharia	2	1	0	0	0	3
10	DF	(Georgia (country))	4	Saba Khvadagiani	2	0	0	0	0	2
10	DF	(Georgia (country))	31	Giorgi Maisuradze	2	0	0	0	0	2
10	MF	(Georgia (country))	5	Anzor Mekvabishvili	2	0	0	0	0	2
10				Own goal	2	0	0	0	0	2
14	DF	(Georgia (country))	24	Davit Kobouri	1	0	0	0	0	1
14	DF	(Spain)	30	Cadete	1	0	0	0	0	1
14	MF	(Croatia)	25	Denis Bušnja	1	0	0	0	0	1
14	MF	(Georgia (country))	27	Nikoloz Ugrekhelidze	1	0	0	0	0	1
14	FW	(Georgia (country))	14	Jaduli Iobashvili	1	0	0	0	0	1
14	MF	(Ivory Coast)	40	Moussa Sangare	1	0	0	0	0	1
14	FW	(Ghana)	18	Barnes Osei	0	1	0	0	0	1
				TOTALS	93	2	2	2	1	100

=== Clean sheets ===
Place	Position	Nation	Number	Name	Erovnuli Liga	Georgian Cup	Super Cup	UEFA Champions League	UEFA Europa Conference League	Total
1	GK	(Georgia (country))	17	Giorgi Loria	4	1	0	0	0	5
2	GK	(Georgia (country))	1	Davit Kereselidze	3	0	0	0	0	3
2	GK	(Georgia (country))	30	Luka Kutaladze	3	0	0	0	0	3
				TOTALS	10	1	0	0	0	11

=== Disciplinary record ===
Number	Nation	Position	Name	Erovnuli Liga		Georgian Cup		Super Cup		UEFA Champions League		UEFA Europa Conference League		Total	
Number	Nation	Position	Name	Yellow card	Red card	Yellow card	Red card	Yellow card	Red card	Yellow card	Red card	Yellow card	Red card	Yellow card	Red card
2	(Georgia (country))	DF	Nikoloz Mali	2	0	0	0	0	0	0	0	0	0	2	0
3	(Georgia (country))	DF	Aleksandre Kalandadze	10	0	1	0	0	0	1	0	0	0	12	0
4	(Georgia (country))	DF	Saba Khvadagiani	5	0	0	0	0	0	0	0	0	0	5	0
5	(Georgia (country))	MF	Anzor Mekvabishvili	6	0	1	0	0	0	0	0	0	0	7	0
7	(Georgia (country))	FW	Davit Skhirtladze	3	0	0	0	1	0	0	0	0	0	4	0
12	(Georgia (country))	MF	Giorgi Kharaishvili	3	0	1	0	1	0	0	0	1	0	6	0
14	(Georgia (country))	FW	Jaduli Iobashvili	1	0	0	0	0	0	0	0	0	0	1	0
17	(Georgia (country))	GK	Giorgi Loria	1	0	0	0	0	0	0	0	1	0	2	0
18	(Ghana)	FW	Barnes Osei	10	0	0	0	1	0	0	0	1	0	12	0
21	(Georgia (country))	DF	Luka Lakvekheliani	3	0	0	0	0	0	0	0	0	0	3	0
22	(Georgia (country))	MF	Vato Arveladze	1	0	0	0	0	0	0	0	0	0	1	0
23	(Georgia (country))	FW	Tornike Kirkitadze	1	0	0	0	0	0	0	0	0	0	1	0
25	(Croatia)	MF	Denis Bušnja	2	0	0	0	0	0	0	0	0	0	2	0
27	(Georgia (country))	MF	Nikoloz Ugrekhelidze	4	0	0	0	0	0	0	0	0	0	4	0
30	(Spain)	DF	Cadete	4	0	0	0	0	0	0	0	0	0	4	0
31	(Georgia (country))	DF	Giorgi Maisuradze	6	0	0	0	1	0	0	0	0	0	7	0
32	(Serbia)	FW	Zoran Marušić	1	0	0	0	0	0	0	0	0	0	1	0
33	(Georgia (country))	DF	Gagi Margvelashvili	0	0	0	0	0	0	0	0	1	0	1	0
34	(Georgia (country))	DF	Luka Latsabidze	1	0	0	0	0	0	0	0	0	0	1	0
39	(Georgia (country))	FW	Lasha Odisharia	3	0	0	0	0	0	0	0	0	0	3	0
Players away on loan:
8	(Georgia (country))	MF	Giorgi Moistsrapishvili	2	0	0	0	0	0	0	0	0	0	2	0
30	(Georgia (country))	GK	Luka Kutaladze	0	1	0	0	0	0	0	0	0	0	0	1
Players who left Dinamo Tbilisi during the season:
11	(Netherlands)	MF	Imran Oulad Omar	3	0	0	0	0	0	0	0	1	0	4	0
13	(Georgia (country))	DF	Jemal Tabidze	6	2	0	0	0	0	0	0	1	0	7	2
17	(Republic of the Congo)	DF	Francis Nzaba	2	0	0	0	0	0	0	0	0	0	2	0
38	(Georgia (country))	MF	Gabriel Sigua	1	0	0	0	0	0	0	0	0	0	1	0
			TOTALS	79	3	3	0	4	0	1	0	6	0	93	3
