= 2023 Georgian Super Cup =

Football tournament in Kazakhstan

Tournament details
- Host country: Georgia
- Dates: 30 June - 4 July
- Teams: 4

Final positions
- Champions: Dinamo Tbilisi (9th title)
- Runners-up: Dinamo Batumi

Tournament statistics
- Matches played: 4
- Goals scored: 4 (1 per match)

The 2023 Georgian Super Cup was the 22nd edition of the Georgian Super Cup, an annual football competition for clubs in the Georgian football league system that were successful in its major competitions in the preceding season. It was the first edition of the tournament to be played under the new format with four teams.

During the semi-final stage, both games went to penalties, with Dinamo Batumi defeating Torpedo Kutaisi 6–5, and Dinamo Tbilisi defeating Dila Gori 4–2.

Both the final and the third place playoff also went to penalties, with Dinamo Tbilisi winning 4–3 against Dinamo Batumi in the final and Torpedo Kutaisi defeating Dila Gori 5–4 in the third place playoff.

== Qualification ==
=== Qualified teams ===
The following four teams qualified for the tournament.

Team	Method of qualification	Appearance	Last appearance as	Years performance	
Team	Method of qualification	Appearance	Last appearance as	Winner(s)	Runners-up
Dinamo Tbilisi	2022 Erovnuli Liga winners	13th	2020 Erovnuli Liga winners	8	4
Torpedo Kutaisi	2022 Georgian Cup winners	5th	2018 Georgian Cup winners	2	2
Dinamo Batumi	2022 Erovnuli Liga runners-up	5th	2021 Erovnuli Liga winners	2	2
Dila Gori	2022 Erovnuli Liga third place	3rd	2014–15 Umaglesi Liga winners	0	2

== Matches ==
=== Bracket ===
Semi-finals
30 June 2023 – Tbilisi
Dinamo Tbilisi	1(4)
Dila Gori	1(2)
30 June 2023 – Samtredia
Torpedo Kutaisi	0(5)
Dinamo Batumi	0(6)

Final
4 July 2023 – Tbilisi
Dinamo Tbilisi	1(4)
Dinamo Batumi	1(3)
Third place
4 July 2023 – Kutaisi
Torpedo Kutaisi	0(5)
Dila Gori	0(4)

=== Semi-finals ===
30 June 2023
17:00 (UTC+4)

Torpedo Kutaisi	0 – 0	Dinamo Batumi
Nadaraia (yellow card) 22'; Shergelashvili (yellow card) 43'; Caballero (yellow card) 90+1'; Aldair (yellow card) 90+3'	Report	Balić (yellow card) 45'; Giorbelidze (yellow card) 58'; Flamarion (yellow card) 84'; Mamuchashvili (yellow card) 90+2'; Vatsadze (yellow card) 90+3'
Penalties
Shergelashvili (penalty scored); Gigauri (penalty scored); Kobuladze (penalty scored); Caballero (penalty scored); Arabidze (penalty scored); Bugridze (penalty missed)	5 – 6	(penalty scored) Kobakhidze; (penalty scored) Mamuchashvili; (penalty scored) Bidzinashvili; (penalty scored) Jakobsen; (penalty scored) Flamarion; (penalty scored) Balić

Erosi Manjgaladze Stadium, Samtredia
Referee: Giorgi Kruashvili

30 June 2023
20:00 (UTC+4)

Dinamo Tbilisi	1 – 1	Dila Gori
Kharaishvili (yellow card) 9'; Osei (yellow card) 48'; Omar 72'; Maisuradze (yellow card) 88'	Report	Parulava (yellow card) 25'; Kovtalyuk (yellow card) 38'; Sardalishvili (yellow card) 81'; Tevzadze (yellow card) 83'; Gomis 90+4'
Penalties
Tabidze (penalty scored); Kharaishvili (penalty scored); Osei (penalty scored); Iobashvili (penalty scored)	4 – 2	(penalty missed) Santos; (penalty scored) Chiteishvili; (penalty scored) Gomis; (penalty missed) Sardalishvili

Mikheil Meskhi Stadium, Tbilisi
Referee: Irakli Kvirikashvili

=== Match for third place ===
4 July 2023
20:00 (UTC+4)

Torpedo Kutaisi	0 – 0	Dila Gori
Akbari (yellow card) 13'	Report	Dzotsenidze (yellow card) 20'; Kukhianidze (yellow card) 62'
Penalties
Nadaraia (penalty missed); Gigauri (penalty scored); Kobuladze (penalty scored); Caballero (penalty scored); Arabidze (penalty missed); Sandokhadze (penalty scored); Shergelashvili (penalty scored)	5 – 4	(penalty scored) Chiteishvili; (penalty scored) Tevzadze; (penalty missed) Kukhianidze; (penalty scored) Andronikashvili; (penalty missed) Wanderson; (penalty scored) Gale; (penalty missed) Etou

Ramaz Shengelia Stadium, Kutaisi
Referee: Jener Khorava

=== Final ===
4 July 2023
20:00 (UTC+4)

Dinamo Tbilisi	1 – 1	Dinamo Batumi
Skhirtladze (yellow card) 58'; Sigua 77'	Report	Flamarion 25'; Balić (yellow card) 90+3'
Penalties
Skhirtladze (penalty missed); Camara (penalty missed); Kharaishvili (penalty scored); Moistsrapishvili (penalty scored); Maisuradze (penalty scored); Sigua (penalty scored)	4 – 3	(penalty missed) Kobakhidze; (penalty scored) Mamuchashvili; (penalty scored) Zaria; (penalty missed) Mosiashvili; (penalty scored) Flamarion; (penalty missed) Kharebava

Boris Paichadze Dinamo Arena, Tbilisi
Referee: Davit Kharitonashvili

== See also ==
- 2023 Erovnuli Liga
- 2023 Georgian Cup
