= 2023 Georgian Super Cup final =

2023 Georgian Super Cup
Dinamo Tbilisi	Dinamo Batumi
1	1
- Date: 4 July 2023
- Venue: Boris Paichadze Dinamo Arena, Tbilisi
- Referee: Davit Kharitonashvili

2023 Georgian Super Cup was a Georgian football match that was played on 4 July 2023 between the champions of the 2022 Erovnuli Liga, Dinamo Tbilisi, and the 2022 Erovnuli Liga runners-up Dinamo Batumi.

Dinamo Tbilisi defeated Dinamo Batumi 4–3 on penalties after the game initially finished a 1–1 draw.

== Match details ==
4 July 2023
20:00 UTC+04:00

Dinamo Tbilisi	1–1	Dinamo Batumi
Flamarion 25'	Report	Sigua 77'
Penalties
Skhirtladze (penalty missed); Camara (penalty missed); Kharaishvili (penalty scored); Moistsrapishvili (penalty scored); Maisuradze (penalty scored); Sigua (penalty scored)	4 – 3	(penalty missed) Kobakhidze; (penalty scored) Mamuchashvili; (penalty scored) Zaria; (penalty missed) Mosiashvili; (penalty scored) Flamarion; (penalty missed) Kharebava

Boris Paichadze Dinamo Arena, Tbilisi
Referee: Davit Kharitonashvili

Dinamo Tbilisi	Dinamo Batumi

GK	17	(Georgia (country)) Giorgi Loria
DF	2	(Georgia (country)) Nikoloz Mali		(substituted off) 46'
DF	13	(Georgia (country)) Jemal Tabidze
DF	24	(Georgia (country)) Davit Kobouri		(substituted off) 46'
DF	33	(Georgia (country)) Gagi Margvelashvili
MF	11	(Netherlands) Imran Oulad Omar		(substituted off) 63'
MF	12	(Georgia (country)) Giorgi Kharaishvili
MF	16	(Georgia (country)) Levan Osikmashvili		(substituted off) 58'
FW	7	(Georgia (country)) Davit Skhirtladze	(yellow card) 57'
FW	18	(Ghana) Barnes Osei		(substituted off) 70'
FW	28	(Guinea) Ousmane Camara
Substitutes:
GK	1	(Georgia (country)) Davit Kereselidze
DF	4	(Georgia (country)) Saba Khvadagiani
MF	8	(Georgia (country)) Giorgi Moistsrapishvili		(substituted on) 58'
FW	14	(Georgia (country)) Jaduli Iobashvili
DF	21	(Georgia (country)) Luka Lakvekheliani		(substituted on) 46'
MF	23	(Georgia (country)) Tornike Kirkitadze		(substituted on) 70'
DF	31	(Georgia (country)) Giorgi Maisuradze		(substituted on) 46'
DF	34	(Georgia (country)) Luka Latsabidze
MF	38	(Georgia (country)) Gabriel Sigua		(substituted on) 63'
Manager:
(Georgia (country)) Giorgi Chiabrishvili

GK	31	(Belarus) Anton Chichkan
DF	2	(Georgia (country)) Guram Giorbelidze		(substituted off) 60'
DF	3	(Nigeria) Benjamin Teidi		(substituted off) 87'
DF	23	(Georgia (country)) Mamuka Kobakhidze
DF	33	(Montenegro) Saša Balić	(yellow card) 903'
DF	35	(Georgia (country)) Grigol Chabradze
MF	5	(Ukraine) Ivan Lytvynenko		(substituted off) 60'
MF	17	(Georgia (country)) Vladimer Mamuchashvili
FW	8	(Egypt) Alexander Jakobsen		(substituted off) 74'
FW	24	(Georgia (country)) Irakli Bidzinashvili		(substituted off) 60'
FW	40	(Brazil) Flamarion
Substitutes:
GK	13	(Georgia (country)) Luka Kharatishvili
DF	4	(Georgia (country)) Luka Kapianidze
MF	6	(Georgia (country)) Tsotne Mosiashvili		(substituted on) 60'
MF	7	(Georgia (country)) Giorgi Zaria		(substituted on) 60'
MF	9	(Georgia (country)) Tornike Kapanadze		(substituted on) 74'
FW	11	(Georgia (country)) Mate Vatsadze
MF	15	(Georgia (country)) Mukhran Bagrationi
MF	27	(Georgia (country)) Paata Gudushauri		(substituted on) 60'
MF	30	(Georgia (country)) Giorgi Kharebava		(substituted on) 87'
Manager:
(Georgia (country)) Gia Geguchadze

== See also ==
- 2022 Erovnuli Liga
- 2022 Georgian Cup
