= 2023 Erovnuli Liga =

Erovnuli Liga
- Season: 2023
- Dates: 25 February – 2 December 2023
- Champions: Dinamo Batumi (2nd Georgian title)
- Relegated: Shukura Kobuleti
- Champions League: Dinamo Batumi
- Conference League: Dinamo Tbilisi; Torpedo Kutaisi; Saburtalo Tbilisi (via Georgian Cup)
- Matches: 180
- Goals: 560 (3.11 per match)
- Top goalscorer: Flamarion; Zoran Marušić; Zurab Museliani (17 goals)
- All statistics correct as of 2 December 2023.

The 2023 Erovnuli Liga or Crystalbet Erovnuli Liga 2023 (formerly known as Umaglesi Liga) was the 35th season of top-tier football in Georgia. Dinamo Tbilisi were the defending champions.

== Teams and stadiums ==
=== Changes ===
Shukura Kobuleti and FC Samtredia were promoted from the 2022 Erovnuli Liga 2. Locomotive Tbilisi and Sioni Bolnisi have been relegated to 2023 Erovnuli Liga 2.

Locations of the 2023 Erovnuli Liga teams

Team	Location	Venue	Capacity
Dila Gori	Gori	Tengiz Burjanadze Stadium	5,000
Dinamo Batumi	Batumi	Adjarabet Arena	20,000
Dinamo Tbilisi	Tbilisi	Boris Paichadze Stadium; Tengiz Burjanadze Stadium, Gori	54,549; 5,000
Gagra	Tbilisi	Ilia Kokaia Football Center; David Petriashvili Stadium	500; 2,130
Saburtalo Tbilisi	Tbilisi	Mikheil Meskhi Stadium; GFF Technical Centre, Rustavi	22,754; 1,000
Samgurali Tsqaltubo	Tsqaltubo	David Abashidze Stadium, Zestaponi	4,558
FC Samtredia	Samtredia	Erosi Manjgaladze Stadium	3,000
Shukura Kobuleti	Kobuleti	David Abashidze Stadium, Zestaponi; Joni Bakuradze Sport Base Stadium, Batumi	4,558; 8,000
FC Telavi	Telavi	GFF Technical Centre, Rustavi	1,000
Torpedo Kutaisi	Kutaisi	Ramaz Shengelia Stadium; Erosi Manjgaladze Stadium, Samtredia	19,400; 5,000

=== Personnel and kits ===
Team	Head coach	Captain	Kit manufacturer	Shirt sponsor
Dila	(Georgia (country)) Irakli Modebadze	(Georgia (country)) Davit Maisashvili	Nike	Marsbet
Dinamo Batumi	(Ukraine) Andriy Demchenko	(Georgia (country)) Mamuka Kobakhidze	Macron	Crocobet; Lixin Group
Dinamo Tbilisi	(Spain) Andrés Carrasco	(Georgia (country)) Giorgi Papava	Puma	adjarabet.com Marsbet
Gagra	(Georgia (country)) Giorgi Oniani	(Georgia (country)) Vasil Khositashvili	Puma	N/A
Saburtalo	(Georgia (country)) Giorgi Mikadze	(Georgia (country)) Levan Kakubava	Saller	Audi
Samgurali	(Ukraine) Oleksandr Poklonskyi	(Georgia (country)) Papuna Poniava	Hummel	Halyk Bank; Crocobet
Samtredia	(North Macedonia) Dimitar Kapinkovski	(Georgia (country)) Givi Ioseliani	Kelme	N/A
Shukura	(Georgia (country)) Revaz Dzodzuashvili	(Georgia (country)) Mishiko Sardalishvili	Jako	Crocobet
Telavi	(Georgia (country)) Tamaz Odikadze (interim)	(Georgia (country)) Mirian Jikia	Jako	N/A
Torpedo	(Scotland) Steve Kean	(Georgia (country)) Irakli Dzaria	Macron	New Vision University

== League table ==
Pos	Team	Pld	W	D	L	GF	GA	GD	Pts	Qualification or relegation
1	Dinamo Batumi (C)	36	21	11	4	83	41	+42	74	Qualification for the Champions League first qualifying round
2	Dinamo Tbilisi	36	21	8	7	93	49	+44	71	Qualification for the Conference League first qualifying round
3	Torpedo Kutaisi	36	16	12	8	55	37	+18	60	Qualification for the Conference League first qualifying round
4	Dila Gori	36	17	9	10	56	39	+17	60	
5	Samgurali Tsqaltubo	36	16	9	11	53	51	+2	57	
6	Saburtalo Tbilisi	36	14	9	13	58	49	+9	51	Qualification for the Conference League second qualifying round (Note: Saburtalo Tbilisi qualified for the Conference League second qualifying round by winning the 2023 Georgian Cup.)
7	Gagra	36	10	8	18	47	65	−18	38	
8	Telavi (O)	36	10	7	19	34	62	−28	37	Qualification to Relegation play-off
9	Samtredia (O)	36	9	6	21	50	62	−12	33	Qualification to Relegation play-off
10	Shukura Kobuleti (R)	36	4	5	27	38	112	−74	11 (Note: Shukura deducted 6 points due to violating the league's financial rules)	Relegated to Liga 4 due to failure to meet licensing requirements

Source: Erovnuli Liga, Soccerway
Rules for classification: 1) Points; 2) Head-to-head points; 3) Head-to-head goal difference; 4) Head-to-head goals scored; 5) Head-to-head away goals scored (only if two teams); 6) Goal difference; 7) Goals scored.
(C) Champions; (O) Play-off winners; (R) Relegated

== Results ==
Each team will play the other nine teams home and away twice, for a total of 36 games each.

=== Round 1–18 ===
Home \ Away	DIL	DBT	DTB	GAG	SAB	SMG	SAM	SHU	TEL	TKU
Dila Gori	—	1–1	1–2	1–0	1–1	0–3	1–0	2–0	6–1	5–0
Dinamo Batumi	0–2	—	2–2	3–1	3–1	2–0	3–2	2–1	2–0	1–1
Dinamo Tbilisi	1–2	1–2	—	0–0	1–3	2–0	4–0	4–4	6–1	2–1
Gagra	0–0	1–4	3–5	—	1–2	3–4	0–1	2–0	1–1	0–0
Saburtalo Tbilisi	0–0	3–3	2–1	3–0	—	5–1	2–0	2–1	3–0	0–0
Samgurali	2–2	1–1	2–1	1–0	2–1	—	2–1	4–1	1–0	0–0
FC Samtredia	1–2	1–2	0–2	1–2	3–3	0–2	—	0–2	1–0	0–2
Shukura Kobuleti	2–3 (Note: Postponed due to weather conditions)	1–3	1–2	3–4	2–3	2–1	2–2	—	1–2	0–2
Telavi	2–2	1–4	2–2	0–0	0–3	0–1	0–1	0–0	—	1–0
Torpedo Kutaisi	0–0	0–0	2–3	3–1	0–3	1–3	1–0	1–2	2–1	—

Source: Erovnuli Liga Results Erovnuli Liga Fixtures
Legend: Blue = home team win; Yellow = draw; Red = away team win.

=== Round 19–36 ===
Home \ Away	DIL	DBT	DTB	GAG	SAB	SMG	SAM	SHU	TEL	TKU
Dila Gori	—	1–3 (Note: Postponed)	0–3 (Note: Postponed)	1–0	3–0	2–0	1–3	5–1	3–1	0–1
Dinamo Batumi	1–1	—	2–2	3–0	2–1	4–1	1–1	5–0	3–0	2–2
Dinamo Tbilisi	3–1	6–2	—	0–1	1–0	5–2	3–0	4–2	4–0	1–1
Gagra	0–0	0–2	1–6	—	2–1	0–0	4–3	1–0	4–1	1–2
Saburtalo Tbilisi	1–2	0–0	0–3	5–0	—	2–2	0–0	5–1	0–1	1–3
Samgurali	1–0	3–2	0–2	2–2	1–0	—	0–3	5–0	0–1	0–0
FC Samtredia	1–2	1–3	3–2	3–1	0–0	2–3	—	4–2	0–2	2–3
Shukura Kobuleti	1–2	0–6	2–3	9–0	1–2	2–2	0–9	—	0–2	0–0
Telavi	2–1	2–1	2–2	0–1	3–0	2–1	1–1	0–1	—	1–2
Torpedo Kutaisi	1–0	0–3	2–2	4–1	5–0	0–0	2–0	9–0	2–1	—

Source: Erovnuli Liga Results Erovnuli Liga Fixtures
Legend: Blue = home team win; Yellow = draw; Red = away team win.

== Relegation play-offs ==
6 December 2023
13:00

Samtredia	4–1	Gareji Sagarejo
Mishov 6'; Pavisic 25'; Akhvlediani 38'; Natchkebia 43'		Kharebashvili 67'

Erosi Manjgaladze Stadium, Samtredia
Referee: Aleko Aptsiauri
10 December 2023
13:00

Gareji Sagarejo	3–1	Samtredia
Ugrekhelidze 14'; Papuashvili 36'; Kharebashvili 47'		Natchkebia 8'

Central stadium, Sagarejo
Referee: Irakli Kvirikashvili

6 December 2023
17:00

Spaeri Tbilisi	1–1	Telavi
Gegiadze 36'		Rukhadze 61'

Spaeri Stadium, Tbilisi
Referee: Giorgi Avazashvili
10 December 2023
18:00

Telavi	4–0	Spaeri Tbilisi
Ashortia 15' (pen.), 53'; Rukhadze 21'; Kantaria 28'

Caucasus Arena, Telavi
Referee: Giorgi Kruashvili

== Statistics ==
=== Top scorers ===
As of matches played on 2 December 2023

Rank	Player	Club	Goals
1	(Brazil) Flamarion	Dinamo Batumi	17
1	(Serbia) Zoran Marušić	Dinamo Tbilisi	17
1	(Georgia (country)) Zurab Museliani	Gagra	17
4	(Guinea) Ousmane Camara	Dinamo Tbilisi	14
4	(Georgia (country)) Giorgi Arabidze	Torpedo Kutaisi	14
6	(Netherlands) Imran Oulad Omar	Dinamo Tbilisi	13
7	(Georgia (country)) Paata Gudushauri	Dinamo Batumi	12
7	(Georgia (country)) Vladimer Mamuchashvili	Dinamo Batumi	12
7	(Mali) Cheykne Sylla	Saburtalo	12
7	(Georgia (country)) Davit Skhirtladze	Dinamo Tbilisi	12

=== Hat-tricks ===
Player	For	Against	Result	Date	Ref.
(Brazil) Flamarion	Dinamo Batumi	Gagra	1–4 (A)	18 March 2023	
(Georgia (country)) Giorgi Nikabadze	Samgurali Tsqaltubo	Torpedo Kutaisi	1–3 (A)	14 May 2023	
(Georgia (country)) Zurab Museliani	Shukura Kobuleti	Gagra	3–4 (A)	1 June 2023	
(Netherlands) Imran Oulad Omar	Dinamo Tbilisi	Gagra	1–6 (A)	13 August 2023	
(Serbia) Zoran Marušić	Dinamo Tbilisi	Samgurali Tsqaltubo	5–2 (H)	19 August 2023	
(Cameroon) Cyrille Tchamba	Saburtalo Tbilisi	Gagra	5–0 (H)	2 September 2023	
(Georgia (country)) Giorgi Tsitaishvili	Dinamo Batumi	Shukura Kobuleti	0–6 (A)	2 October 2023	
(Serbia) Nikola Ninković	Torpedo Kutaisi	Shukura Kobuleti	9–0 (H)	28 November 2023	
(Georgia (country)) Zurab Museliani ^{7}	Gagra	Shukura Kobuleti	0–9 (A)	2 December 2023	

- ^{7} Player scored 7 goals

=== Clean sheets ===
As of matches played on 2 December 2023

Rank	Player	Club	Clean sheets
1	(Ukraine) Yevhen Kucherenko	Dila Gori	12
2	(Georgia (country)) Roin Kvaskhvadze	Torpedo Kutaisi / Dinamo Batumi	11
3	(Georgia (country)) Lazare Kupatadze	Saburtalo Tbilisi	9
3	(Ukraine) Oleksandr Vorobey	Gagra	9
5	(Georgia (country)) Levan Shovnadze	Samgurali Tsqaltubo	7
6	(Georgia (country)) Oto Goshadze	Torpedo Kutaisi	6
6	(Serbia) Filip Kljajić	Torpedo Kutaisi	6
8	(Georgia (country)) Nodari Kalichava	Samgurali Tsqaltubo	4
8	(Armenia) David Yurchenko	Telavi	4
8	(Georgia (country)) Luka Kutaladze	Dinamo Tbilisi / Samgurali Tsqaltubo	4
8	(Georgia (country)) Giorgi Loria	Dinamo Tbilisi	4
