= UEFA Euro 2020 qualifying Group D =

Football tournament qualifying stage

Group D of UEFA Euro 2020 qualifying was one of the ten groups to decide which teams would qualify for the UEFA Euro 2020 finals tournament. Group D consisted of five teams: Denmark, Georgia, Gibraltar, Republic of Ireland and Switzerland, where they played against each other home-and-away in a round-robin format.

The top two teams, Switzerland and Denmark qualified directly for the finals. Unlike previous editions, the participants of the play-offs were not decided based on results from the qualifying group stage, but instead based on their performance in the 2018–19 UEFA Nations League.

== Standings ==
Pos	Team	Pld	W	D	L	GF	GA	GD	Pts	Qualification	(Switzerland)	(Denmark)	(Republic of Ireland)	(Georgia (country))	(Gibraltar)
1	Switzerland	8	5	2	1	19	6	+13	17	Qualify for final tournament	—	3–3	2–0	1–0	4–0
2	Denmark	8	4	4	0	23	6	+17	16	Qualify for final tournament	1–0	—	1–1	5–1	6–0
3	Republic of Ireland	8	3	4	1	7	5	+2	13	Advance to play-offs via Nations League	1–1	1–1	—	1–0	2–0
4	Georgia	8	2	2	4	7	11	−4	8	Advance to play-offs via Nations League	0–2	0–0	0–0	—	3–0
5	Gibraltar	8	0	0	8	3	31	−28	0		1–6	0–6	0–1	2–3	—

Source: UEFA
Rules for classification: Qualification tiebreakers

== Matches ==
The fixtures were released by UEFA the same day as the draw, which was held on 2 December 2018 in Dublin. Times are CET/CEST, (Note: CET (UTC+1) for matches in March and November 2019, and CEST (UTC+2) for all other matches.) as listed by UEFA (local times, if different, are in parentheses).

23 March 2019
15:00 (18:00 UTC+4)

Georgia	0–2	Switzerland
	Report	Zuber 56'; Zakaria 80'

Boris Paichadze Dinamo Arena, Tbilisi
Attendance: 49,207
Referee: Craig Pawson (England)
23 March 2019
18:00

Gibraltar	0–1	Republic of Ireland
	Report	Hendrick 49'

Victoria Stadium, Gibraltar
Attendance: 2,000
Referee: Anastasios Papapetrou (Greece)

26 March 2019
20:45 (19:45 UTC+0)

Republic of Ireland	1–0	Georgia
Hourihane 36'	Report

Aviva Stadium, Dublin
Attendance: 40,317
Referee: Serdar Gözübüyük (Netherlands)
26 March 2019
20:45

Switzerland	3–3	Denmark
Freuler 19'; Xhaka 66'; Embolo 76'	Report	M. Jørgensen 84'; Gytkjær 88'; Dalsgaard 90+3'

St. Jakob-Park, Basel
Attendance: 18,352
Referee: Damir Skomina (Slovenia)

7 June 2019
18:00 (20:00 UTC+4)

Georgia	3–0	Gibraltar
Gvilia 30'; Papunashvili 59'; Arveladze 76' (pen.)	Report

Boris Paichadze Dinamo Arena, Tbilisi
Attendance: 18,631
Referee: Antti Munukka (Finland)
7 June 2019
20:45

Denmark	1–1	Republic of Ireland
Højbjerg 76'	Report	Duffy 85'

Parken Stadium, Copenhagen
Attendance: 34,610
Referee: Cüneyt Çakır (Turkey)

10 June 2019
20:45

Denmark	5–1	Georgia
Dolberg 13', 63'; Eriksen 30' (pen.); Poulsen 73'; Braithwaite 90+3'	Report	Lobzhanidze 25'

Parken Stadium, Copenhagen
Attendance: 15,387
Referee: Robert Schörgenhofer (Austria)
10 June 2019
20:45 (19:45 UTC+1)

Republic of Ireland	2–0	Gibraltar
J. Chipolina 29' (o.g.); Brady 90+3'	Report

Aviva Stadium, Dublin
Attendance: 36,281
Referee: Radu Petrescu (Romania)

5 September 2019
20:45

Gibraltar	0–6	Denmark
	Report	Skov 6'; Eriksen 34' (pen.), 50' (pen.); Delaney 69'; Gytkjær 73', 78'

Victoria Stadium, Gibraltar
Attendance: 2,076
Referee: Jonathan Lardot (Belgium)
5 September 2019
20:45 (19:45 UTC+1)

Republic of Ireland	1–1	Switzerland
McGoldrick 85'	Report	Schär 74'

Aviva Stadium, Dublin
Attendance: 44,111
Referee: Carlos del Cerro Grande (Spain)

8 September 2019
18:00 (20:00 UTC+4)

Georgia	0–0	Denmark
	Report

Boris Paichadze Dinamo Arena, Tbilisi
Attendance: 21,456
Referee: François Letexier (France)
8 September 2019
18:00

Switzerland	4–0	Gibraltar
Zakaria 37'; Mehmedi 43'; Rodriguez 45+4'; Gavranović 87'	Report

Stade Tourbillon, Sion
Attendance: 8,318
Referee: Pavel Orel (Czech Republic)

12 October 2019
15:00 (17:00 UTC+4)

Georgia	0–0	Republic of Ireland
	Report

Boris Paichadze Dinamo Arena, Tbilisi
Attendance: 24,385
Referee: Marco Guida (Italy)
12 October 2019
18:00

Denmark	1–0	Switzerland
Poulsen 84'	Report

Parken Stadium, Copenhagen
Attendance: 35,964
Referee: Aleksei Kulbakov (Belarus)

15 October 2019
20:45

Gibraltar	2–3	Georgia
Casciaro 66'; R. Chipolina 74'	Report	Kharaishvili 10'; Kankava 21'; Kvilitaia 84'

Victoria Stadium, Gibraltar
Attendance: 1,455
Referee: Paolo Valeri (Italy)
15 October 2019
20:45

Switzerland	2–0	Republic of Ireland
Seferovic 16'; Fernandes 90+3'	Report

Stade de Genève, Geneva
Attendance: 24,766
Referee: Szymon Marciniak (Poland)

15 November 2019
20:45

Denmark	6–0	Gibraltar
Skov 12', 64'; Gytkjær 47'; Braithwaite 51'; Eriksen 85', 90+3'	Report

Parken Stadium, Copenhagen
Attendance: 24,033
Referee: István Vad (Hungary)
15 November 2019
20:45

Switzerland	1–0	Georgia
Itten 77'	Report

Kybunpark, St. Gallen
Attendance: 16,400
Referee: Danny Makkelie (Netherlands)

18 November 2019
20:45

Gibraltar	1–6	Switzerland
Styche 74'	Report	Itten 10', 84'; Vargas 50'; Fassnacht 57'; Benito 75'; Xhaka 86'

Victoria Stadium, Gibraltar
Attendance: 2,079
Referee: Benoît Millot (France)
18 November 2019
20:45 (19:45 UTC+0)

Republic of Ireland	1–1	Denmark
Doherty 85'	Report	Braithwaite 73'

Aviva Stadium, Dublin
Attendance: 50,000
Referee: Felix Brych (Germany)

== Goalscorers ==
There were 59 goals scored in 20 matches, for an average of 2.95 goals per match.

5 goals

- (Denmark national football team) Christian Eriksen

4 goals

- (Denmark national football team) Christian Gytkjær

3 goals

- (Denmark national football team) Martin Braithwaite
- (Denmark national football team) Robert Skov
- (Switzerland national football team) Cedric Itten

2 goals

- (Denmark national football team) Kasper Dolberg
- (Denmark national football team) Yussuf Poulsen
- (Switzerland national football team) Granit Xhaka
- (Switzerland national football team) Denis Zakaria

1 goal

- (Denmark national football team) Henrik Dalsgaard
- (Denmark national football team) Thomas Delaney
- (Denmark national football team) Pierre-Emile Højbjerg
- (Denmark national football team) Mathias Jørgensen
- (Georgia national football team) Vato Arveladze
- (Georgia national football team) Valerian Gvilia
- (Georgia national football team) Jaba Kankava
- (Georgia national football team) Giorgi Kharaishvili
- (Georgia national football team) Giorgi Kvilitaia
- (Georgia national football team) Saba Lobzhanidze
- (Georgia national football team) Giorgi Papunashvili
- (Gibraltar national football team) Lee Casciaro
- (Gibraltar national football team) Roy Chipolina
- (Gibraltar national football team) Reece Styche
- (Republic of Ireland national football team) Robbie Brady
- (Republic of Ireland national football team) Matt Doherty
- (Republic of Ireland national football team) Shane Duffy
- (Republic of Ireland national football team) Jeff Hendrick
- (Republic of Ireland national football team) Conor Hourihane
- (Republic of Ireland national football team) David McGoldrick
- (Switzerland national football team) Loris Benito
- (Switzerland national football team) Breel Embolo
- (Switzerland national football team) Christian Fassnacht
- (Switzerland national football team) Edimilson Fernandes
- (Switzerland national football team) Remo Freuler
- (Switzerland national football team) Mario Gavranović
- (Switzerland national football team) Admir Mehmedi
- (Switzerland national football team) Ricardo Rodriguez
- (Switzerland national football team) Fabian Schär
- (Switzerland national football team) Haris Seferović
- (Switzerland national football team) Rubén Vargas
- (Switzerland national football team) Steven Zuber

1 own goal

- (Gibraltar national football team) Joseph Chipolina (against Republic of Ireland)

== Discipline ==
A player was automatically suspended for the next match for the following offences:

- Receiving a red card (red card suspensions could be extended for serious offences)
- Receiving three yellow cards in three different matches, as well as after fifth and any subsequent yellow card (yellow card suspensions were not carried forward to the play-offs, the finals or any other future international matches)

The following suspensions were served during the qualifying matches:

Team	Player	Offence(s)	Suspended for match(es)
Georgia	Jaba Kankava	(yellow card) vs Republic of Ireland (26 March 2019); (yellow card) vs Gibraltar (7 June 2019); (yellow card) vs Denmark (10 June 2019)	vs Denmark (8 September 2019)
Gibraltar	Jayce Olivero	(yellow card) vs Georgia (7 June 2019); (yellow card) vs Republic of Ireland (10 June 2019); (yellow card) vs Denmark (15 November 2019)	vs Switzerland (18 November 2019)
Republic of Ireland	Séamus Coleman	(yellow card) (yellow-red card) vs Switzerland (15 October 2019)	vs Denmark (18 November 2019)
Republic of Ireland	Enda Stevens	(yellow card) vs Gibraltar (23 March 2019); (yellow card) vs Gibraltar (10 June 2019); (yellow card) vs Switzerland (5 September 2019)	vs Georgia (12 October 2019)
