= 2022 Erovnuli Liga =

Erovnuli Liga
- Season: 2022
- Dates: 25 February – 3 December 2022
- Champions: Dinamo Tbilisi; 19th Georgian title
- Conference League: Dinamo Batumi; Dila Gori; Torpedo Kutaisi (via Georgian Cup)
- Matches: 180
- Goals: 492 (2.73 per match)
- Top goalscorer: Flamarion (19 goals)
- Biggest home win: Telavi 5–0 Locomotive Tbilisi (29 April 2022); Dinamo Batumi 7–2 Locomotive Tbilisi (17 May 2022); Dinamo Tbilisi 5–0 Gagra (20 June 2022)
- Biggest away win: Sioni Bolnisi 3–7 Dinamo Tbilisi (8 May 2022)
- Highest scoring: Sioni Bolnisi 3–7 Dinamo Tbilisi (8 May 2022)
- Longest winning run: 6 matches Samgurali
- Longest unbeaten run: 16 matches Dinamo Batumi
- Longest winless run: 16 matches Locomotive Tbilisi
- Longest losing run: 16 matches Locomotive Tbilisi
- All statistics correct as of 3 December 2022.

The 2022 Erovnuli Liga or Crystalbet Erovnuli Liga 2022 (formerly known as Umaglesi Liga) was the 34th season of top-tier football in Georgia. Dinamo Batumi were the defending champions.

== Teams and stadiums ==
=== Changes ===
Sioni Bolnisi (promoted after a two-year absence) and Gagra (promoted after a ten-year absence) were promoted from the 2021 Erovnuli Liga 2. FC Samtredia (relegated after two years in the top flight) and Shukura Kobuleti (relegated after one year in the top flight) have been relegated to 2022 Erovnuli Liga 2.

Locations of the 2022 Erovnuli Liga teams.

Team	Location	Venue	Capacity
Dila Gori	Gori	Tengiz Burjanadze Stadium	5,000
Dinamo Batumi	Batumi	Adjarabet Arena	20,000
Dinamo Tbilisi	Tbilisi	Boris Paichadze Dinamo Arena	54,139
Gagra	Tbilisi	Boris Paichadze Dinamo Arena	54,139
Locomotive Tbilisi	Tbilisi	Mikheil Meskhi Stadium; Mikheil Meskhi 2 Stadium; Saguramo Football Complex, Saguramo	22,754; 2,000; 700
Saburtalo Tbilisi	Tbilisi	Mikheil Meskhi Stadium; Mikheil Meskhi 2 Stadium; GFF Technical Centre, Rustavi	22,754; 2,000; 1,000
Samgurali Tsqaltubo	Tsqaltubo	26 May Stadium	12,000
Sioni Bolnisi	Bolnisi	Tamaz Stepania Stadium	3,000
Telavi	Telavi	Givi Chokheli Stadium	12,000
Torpedo Kutaisi	Kutaisi	Ramaz Shengelia Stadium; David Abashidze Stadium, Zestaponi	19,400; 4,558

=== Personnel and kits ===
Team	Head coach	Captain	Kit manufacturer	Shirt sponsor
Dila	(Ukraine) Andriy Demchenko	(Georgia (country)) Davit Maisashvili	Adidas	Marsbet
Dinamo Batumi	(Georgia (country)) Gia Geguchadze	(Georgia (country)) Mamuka Kobakhidze	Puma	CoinW
Dinamo Tbilisi	(Georgia (country)) Giorgi Tchiabrishvili	(Georgia (country)) Giorgi Papava	Puma	Setanta Sports
Gagra	(Georgia (country)) Gaga Kirkitadze	(Georgia (country)) Vasil Khositashvili	Nike	N/A
Locomotive	(Netherlands) John van Loen	(Georgia (country)) Giorgi Gabadze	Jako	Aversi
Saburtalo	(Georgia (country)) Lasha Nozadze	(Georgia (country)) Levan Kakubava	Erreà	Audi
Samgurali	(Georgia (country)) Giorgi Mikadze	(Georgia (country)) Papuna Poniava	Hummel	Halyk Bank
Sioni Bolnisi	(Georgia (country)) Ucha Sosiashvili	(Georgia (country)) Data Sitchinava	Jako	RMG
Telavi	(Georgia (country)) Gia Tsetsadze	(Georgia (country)) Mirian Jikia	Jako	m2
Torpedo	(Georgia (country)) Kakhaber Chkhetiani	(Georgia (country)) Irakli Dzaria	Puma	New Vision University

== League table ==
Pos	Team	Pld	W	D	L	GF	GA	GD	Pts	Qualification or relegation
1	Dinamo Tbilisi (C)	36	24	8	4	73	29	+44	80	Qualification for the Champions League first qualifying round
2	Dinamo Batumi	36	23	8	5	87	34	+53	77	Qualification for the Europa Conference League first qualifying round
3	Dila Gori	36	17	8	11	48	35	+13	59	Qualification for the Europa Conference League first qualifying round
4	Samgurali Tsqaltubo	36	15	12	9	55	44	+11	57	
5	Torpedo Kutaisi (Note: «Torpedo Kutaisi qualified for the Europa Conference League first qualifying round as 2022 Georgian Cup winner)	36	15	9	12	48	48	0	54	Qualification for the Europa Conference League first qualifying round
6	Saburtalo Tbilisi	36	13	8	15	51	49	+2	47	
7	Telavi	36	8	15	13	29	36	−7	39	
8	Sioni Bolnisi (R)	36	8	12	16	38	60	−22	36	Qualification to Relegation play-offs
9	Gagra (O)	36	9	9	18	36	57	−21	36	Qualification to Relegation play-offs
10	Locomotive Tbilisi (R)	36	1	5	30	28	101	−73	8	Relegation to Erovnuli Liga 2

Source: Erovnuli Liga, Soccerway
Rules for classification: 1) Points; 2) Head-to-head points; 3) Head-to-head goal difference; 4) Head-to-head goals scored; 5) Head-to-head away goals scored (only if two teams); 6) Goal difference; 7) Goals scored.
(C) Champions; (O) Play-off winners; (R) Relegated

== Results ==
Each team will play the other nine teams home and away twice, for a total of 36 games each.

=== Round 1–18 ===
Home \ Away	DIL	DBT	DTB	GAG	LOC	SAB	SMG	SIO	TEL	TKU
Dila Gori	—	2–1	0–1	2–1	4–1	1–0	1–0	2–1	2–1	2–0
Dinamo Batumi	3–0	—	3–0	5–2	7–2	2–2	4–4	4–0	1–0	4–0
Dinamo Tbilisi	2–1 (Note: Postponed due to weather conditions)	0–0	—	5–0	2–1	0–0	0–0	1–0	3–2	4–0
Gagra	1–0	0–3	1–0	—	5–3	1–0	0–2	1–2	2–2	0–2
Locomotive Tbilisi	0–3	0–2	0–2	0–2	—	2–1	0–2	1–2	0–1	0–3
Saburtalo Tbilisi	0–2	0–0	1–1	3–0	3–1	—	2–1	3–3	1–0	2–0
Samgurali	0–0	0–3	2–1	1–1	3–1	3–0	—	1–1	2–1	3–0
Sioni Bolnisi	0–0	1–1	3–7	2–1	5–1	1–0	0–2	—	0–2	1–1
Telavi	0–0	0–2	1–1	1–0	5–0	0–2	0–0	2–0	—	0–0
Torpedo Kutaisi	1–0	0–3	0–3 (Note: Awarded)	1–0	4–2	0–1	0–2	3–0	1–1	—

Source: Erovnuli Liga Results Erovnuli Liga Fixtures
Legend: Blue = home team win; Yellow = draw; Red = away team win.

=== Round 19–36 ===
Home \ Away	DIL	DBT	DTB	GAG	LOC	SAB	SMG	SIO	TEL	TKU
Dila Gori	—	0–1	2–3	1–1	1–0	3–0	3–0	1–2	0–0	2–1
Dinamo Batumi	3–2	—	4–1	2–0	4–2	3–2	1–2	3–0	4–0	5–2
Dinamo Tbilisi	3–0	1–0	—	2–1	5–0	3–1	3–0	3–1	1–1	5–1
Gagra	0–0	1–4	0–1	—	2–0	3–3	1–1	2–1	1–1	0–2
Locomotive Tbilisi	2–2	1–1	0–2	0–2	—	0–1	1–4	2–2	0–2	0–0
Saburtalo Tbilisi	0–2	2–4	1–2	2–1	5–1	—	3–1	1–1	0–1	2–4
Samgurali	0–3	3–0	1–1	2–2	4–1	0–3	—	2–1	2–0	2–2
Sioni Bolnisi	1–2	1–1	0–2	0–0	5–2	1–0	0–0	—	0–0	0–3
Telavi	1–1	0–2	1–2	1–0	0–0	0–3	1–1	0–0	—	1–1
Torpedo Kutaisi	4–1	1–0	0–0	0–1	3–1	1–1	3–2	3–0	1–0	—

Source: Erovnuli Liga Results Erovnuli Liga Fixtures
Legend: Blue = home team win; Yellow = draw; Red = away team win.

=== Relegation play-offs ===
7 December 2022
13:00

FC Samtredia	1–0	Sioni Bolnisi
Kilasonia 79' (pen.)

Erosi Manjgaladze Stadium, Samtredia
Referee: Giorgi Kruashvili
11 December 2022
13:00

Sioni Bolnisi	0–2	FC Samtredia
		Chamba 9', 74'

Tamaz Stepania Stadium, Bolnisi
Referee: Davit Kharitinishvili

8 December 2022
13:00

Gagra	2–0	FC Spaeri
Nozadze 8'; Makatsaria 63'

Boris Paichadze Dinamo Arena, Tbilisi
Referee: Irakli Kvirikashvili
12 December 2022
13:00

FC Spaeri	3–1 (a.e.t.)	Gagra
Tsatskrialashvili 35'; Papava 48' (pen.), 98'		Makatsaria 95' (pen.)
Penalties
Papava (penalty scored); Matenjva (penalty missed); Khojanashvili (penalty scored); Odishelidze (penalty scored); Kirkitadze (penalty scored); Askurava (penalty missed)	4–5	Khositashvili (penalty scored); Lomtadze (penalty scored); Sultanishvili (penalty scored); Lominadze (penalty scored); Parulava (penalty missed); Shetsiruli (penalty scored)

Spaeri Stadium, Tbilisi
Referee: Jener Khorava

== Season statistics ==
=== Top scorers ===
As of matches played on 3 December 2022

Rank	Player	Club	Goals
1	(Brazil) Flamarion	Dinamo Batumi	19
2	(Georgia (country)) Irakli Rukhadze	Samgurali Tsqaltubo	12
2	(Georgia (country)) Irakli Sikharulidze	Saburtalo Tbilisi	12
4	(Ukraine) Stanislav Bilenkyi	Dinamo Tbilisi	10
4	(Guinea) Ousmane Camara	Dinamo Tbilisi	10
6	(Georgia (country)) Nika Khorkheli	Sioni Bolnisi	9
6	(Georgia (country)) Giorgi Kukhianidze	Torpedo Kutaisi	9
6	(Georgia (country)) Mate Vatsadze	Gagra / Dinamo Batumi	9
6	(Georgia (country)) Tornike Kapanadze	Dila Gori	9
10	(Georgia (country)) Khvicha Kvaratskhelia	Dinamo Batumi	8
10	(Brazil) Vágner Gonçalves	Dila Gori	8
10	(Georgia (country)) Iuri Tabatadze	Saburtalo Tbilisi	8
10	(Netherlands) Imran Omar	Dinamo Tbilisi	8
