= Moussa Sangare (footballer) =

Ivorian footballer

Personal information
- Full name: Moussa Baba Sangare
- Date of birth: 21 February 2002 (age 24)
- Place of birth: Ivory Coast
- Height: 1.76 m (5 ft 9 in)
- Position: Left winger

Youth career
- –2020: Right to Dream
- 2020–2022: Nordsjælland

Senior career*
Years	Team	Apps	(Gls)
2022–2023	Nordsjælland	0	(0)
2022	→ Kauno Žalgiris (loan)	16	(2)
2022	→ Næstved (loan)	2	(0)
2023	Železiarne Podbrezová	11	(0)
2023	Dinamo Tbilisi	4	(1)
2024–	Dila	11	(1)
- * Club domestic league appearances and goals as of 11 December 2024

Moussa Sangare (born 21 February 2002) is an Ivorian professional footballer who plays as a left winger for Erovnuli Liga club Dila Gori.

== Club career ==
=== FK Železiarne Podbrezová ===
Sangare made his professional debut for Železiarne Podbrezová against MŠK Žilina on 19 February 2023. Sangare came on in the 62nd minute as a substitute for Šimon Faško and in the 79th minute he netted a winning goal.

=== Dinamo Tbilisi ===
In July 2023, Sangare signed two-year deal with Dinamo Tbilisi. Sangare was released by Dinamo Tbilisi on 8 January 2024.

=== Dila Gori ===
Sangare spent the 2024 season at Dila Gori, taking part in 11 matches. He netted his first goal for Dila in 3–2 home win over Samtredia on 20 September 2024.
