= Luka Lakvekheliani =

Georgian footballer (born 1998)

Luka Lakekheliani
Personal information
- Date of birth: 20 October 1998 (age 28)
- Place of birth: Tbilisi, Georgia
- Height: 1.77 m (5 ft 10 in)
- Position: Left-back

Team information
- Current team: Dinamo Batumi
- Number: 12

Youth career
- –2015: Saburtalo

Senior career*
Years	Team	Apps	(Gls)
2015–2020	Saburtalo	81	(2)
2020–2023	Mezőkövesd	21	(0)
2023–2024	Dinamo Tbilisi	17	(1)
2024	Kolkheti 1913	17	(0)
2024	Gagra	5	(0)
2025–	Dinamo Batumi	41	(0)

International career
2017–2018	Georgia U-19	5	(0)
2018–2019	Georgia U-21	6	(2)
- * Club domestic league appearances and goals as of 12 July 2026

Luka Lakvekheliani (born 20 October 1998) is a Georgian professional footballer who plays as a left-back for Erovnuli Liga club Dinamo Batumi.

Lakvekheliani is the league champion and cup winner with Saburtalo. Individually, he has received the Aleksandre Chivadze golden medal as U19 Player of the Year.

== Career ==
A product of Saburtalo's academy, Lakvekheliani spent five league seasons in Georgia's top division. Apart from becoming a champion and cup winner with Saburtalo, he was named as U19 Player of the Year by the Georgian Football Federation.

In August 2020, Lakvekheliani signed a three-year deal with Hungarian side Mezőkövesd. He returned to Georgia to join champions Dinamo Tbilisi in March 2023 and added two more trophies to his tally during this season.

The player spent half of the 2024 season at Kolkheti 1913 before moving to Gagra.

In January 2025, Lakvekheliani signed for Dinamo Batumi.

== International ==
Lakvekheliani was a member of the national youth teams. In July 2017, he played all three matches of 2018 UEFA European Under-19 Championship qualification round with U19s. A year later, he was called up by coach Giorgi Tsetsadze to the U21 team. He featured in three official games of the 2021 UEFA European Under-21 Championship qualifying round.

== Career statistics ==
As of 23 June 2026

Appearances and goals by club, season and competition
Club	Season	League			Cup		Continental		Other		Total	
Club	Season	Division	Apps	Goals	Apps	Goals	Apps	Goals	Apps	Goals	Apps	Goals
Saburtalo	2015–16	Erovnuli Liga	1	0	0	0	—		0	0	1	0
Saburtalo	2017	Erovnuli Liga	22	0	0	0	—		0	0	22	0
Saburtalo	2018	Erovnuli Liga	27	1	1	0	—		0	0	28	1
Saburtalo	2019	Erovnuli Liga	27	1	3	0	5	0	1	0	36	1
Saburtalo	2020	Erovnuli Liga	4	0	0	0	—		1	0	5	0
Saburtalo	Total		81	2	4	0	5	0	2	0	92	2
Mezőkövesd	2020–21	Nemzeti Bajnokság I	9	0	2	0	—		—		11	0
Mezőkövesd	2021–22	Nemzeti Bajnokság I	9	0	—		—		—		9	0
Mezőkövesd	2022–23	Nemzeti Bajnokság I	3	0	—		—		—		3	0
Mezőkövesd	Total		21	0	2	0	0	0	0	0	23	0
Dinamo Tbilisi	2023	Erovnuli Liga	17	0	1	0	1 (Note: Appearance in UEFA Conference League)	0	2 (Note: Appearances in Georgian Super Cup)	0	21	0
Kolkheti 1913	2024	Erovnuli Liga	17	0	—		—		—		17	0
Gagra	2024	Erovnuli Liga	5	0	2	0	—		—		7	0
Dinamo Batumi	2025	Erovnuli Liga	23	0	1	0	—		—		24	0
Dinamo Batumi	2026	Erovnuli Liga	18	0	0	0	—		—		18	0
Total			41	0	1	0	0	0	0	0	42	0
Career total			182	2	10	0	6	0	4	0	202	2

== Honours ==
Saburtalo

- Erovnuli Liga winner: 2018
- David Kipiani Cup winner: 2019
- Super Cup winner: 2020
- Super Cup runner-up: 2019

Dinamo Tbilisi

- Erovnuli Liga runner-up: 2023
- Super Cup winner: 2023

Individual

- U19 Player of the Year: 2017
