= Gabriel Sigua =

Georgian footballer

Personal information
- Date of birth: 30 June 2005 (age 21)
- Place of birth: Rustavi, Georgia
- Height: 1.90 m (6 ft 3 in)
- Position: Midfielder

Team information
- Current team: Basel
- Number: 26

Youth career
- Rustavi
- 2016–2018: Saburtalo Tbilisi
- 2018–2022: Dinamo Tbilisi

Senior career*
Years	Team	Apps	(Gls)
2022–2023	Dinamo Tbilisi	25	(3)
2023–	Basel	33	(3)
2025–2026	→ Lausanne-Sport (loan)	17	(0)

International career^{‡}
2021	Georgia U-16	2	(1)
2021–2022	Georgia U17	10	(0)
2022	Georgia U18	4	(1)
2022–	Georgia U21	5	(0)
2023–	Georgia	2	(0)
- * Club domestic league appearances and goals as of 9 August 2026 ‡ National team caps and goals as of 18:07, 1 April 2023 (UTC)

Gabriel Sigua Order of Honor (Georgian: გაბრიელ სიგუა; born 30 June 2005) is a Georgian professional footballer who plays as a midfielder for Swiss Super League club Basel and the Georgia national team.

He is the winner of Georgian and Swiss top leagues.

== Club career ==
Sigua is a youth product of Rustavi and Saburtalo Tbilisi. He then moved to the youth academy of Dinamo Tbilisi at the age of 13. He won the U17 Aleksandre Chivadze medal in 2021, recognition for the best young Georgian talents in the year. He made his senior debut with Dinamo Tbilisi in a 2–1 Georgian Cup win over Samtredia on 7 August 2022.

On 12 July 2023, Sigua scored an equalizer in his first appearance in UEFA Champions League qualifiers in a 1–1 draw against Astana.

On 25 July FC Basel announced that had signed Sigua on a five-year contract. He joined Basel's first team for their 2023–24 season under head coach Timo Schultz. Sigua played his domestic league debut for his new club in the home game in the St. Jakob-Park on 13 August, coming on as a substitute in the 78th minute, as Basel were defeated 2–1 by Lausanne-Sport. He scored his first league goal for his new team in the home game on 3 September. Coming on as substitute in the 70th minute, he scored the equaliser in the 5th minute of added time as Basel played a 2–2 draw with Zürich.

== International career ==
Sigua is a youth international for Georgia, and was called up to the senior Georgia national team for a set of matches in March 2023 at the age of 17. He made his international debut with Georgia in a 6–1 friendly win over Mongolia on 25 March 2023.

Sigua was a member of Georgia U21 squad for the 2023 European U21 Championship, co-hosted by Georgia.

== Style of play ==
An active box-to-box midfielder, Sigua is a hard-working, modern footballer. His style has been compared to that of German footballer Leon Goretzka.

== Career statistics ==
As of match played 4 May 2025

Appearances and goals by club, season and competition
Club	Season	League			National cup		Continental		Other		Total	
Club	Season	Division	Apps	Goals	Apps	Goals	Apps	Goals	Apps	Goals	Apps	Goals
Dinamo Tbilisi	2022	Erovnuli Liga	9	0	3	0	–		–		12	0
Dinamo Tbilisi	2023	Erovnuli Liga	16	3	–		2 (Note: Appearances in UEFA Champions League qualifiers)	1	1 (Note: Appearance in Georgian Super Cup)	1	19	5
Dinamo Tbilisi	Total		25	3	3	0	2	1	1	1	31	5
Basel	2023–24	Swiss Super League	17	3	1	0	–		–		18	3
Basel	2024–25	Swiss Super League	13	0	1	1	–		–		14	1
Basel	Total		30	3	2	1	0	0	0	0	32	4
Career total			55	6	5	1	2	1	1	1	63	9

== Honours ==
Dinamo Tbilisi

- Erovnuli Liga: 2022
- Supercup: 2023

Basel

- Swiss Super League: 2024–25

Individual

- U17 Aleksandre Chivadze medal: 2021

== Sources ==
- Profile at FC Basel archiv
