= Vato Arveladze =

Georgian footballer (born 1998)

Personal information
- Full name: Vakhtang Arveladze
- Date of birth: 4 March 1998 (age 28)
- Place of birth: Homburg, Germany
- Height: 1.84 m (6 ft 0 in)
- Position: Attacking midfielder

Team information
- Current team: Telavi
- Number: 10

Senior career*
Years	Team	Apps	(Gls)
2014	Sasco Tbilisi	4	(2)
2014	FS 35 Sapekhburto Skola	2	(2)
2014–2015	Kasımpaşa II		
2015–2018	Locomotivi Tbilisi	40	(8)
2018–2020	Korona Kielce	27	(4)
2020	Locomotivi Tbilisi	5	(0)
2020–2022	Fatih Karagümrük	21	(0)
2022–2023	Neftçi	16	(0)
2023	Dinamo Tbilisi	1	(0)
2024	Kolkheti 1913	2	(0)
2024	Samgurali	8	(0)
2025–	Telavi	12	(2)

International career
2014–2015	Georgia U17	5	(0)
2017	Georgia U19	2	(0)
2017–2020	Georgia U21	13	(3)
2019	Georgia	2	(1)
- * Club domestic league appearances and goals as of 8 December 2025

Vakhtang "Vato" Arveladze (Georgian: ვატო არველაძე; born 4 March 1998) is a Georgian footballer who plays as an attacking midfielder for the Georgian club Telavi.

== Club career ==
In May 2018, Arveladze joined Polish club Korona Kielce from Locomotivi Tbilisi, signing a two-year contract lasting until 2020, with an option of extending for another year. He made his professional debut for Korona in the Ekstraklasa on 28 July 2018, coming on as a substitute for Djibril Diaw in the 70th minute of the home match against Legia Warsaw, which finished as a 2–1 loss.

=== Neftçi ===
On 8 August 2022, Neftçi announced the signing of Arveladze to a one-year contract, with the option of a second, from Fatih Karagümrük. On 22 June 2023, he left Neftçi.

=== Dinamo Tbilisi ===
On 16 August 2023, Arveladze signed for Dinamo Tbilisi until the end of the 2023 season. On 8 January 2024, Dinamo Tbilisi announced that he had left the club following the expiration of his contract.

== International career ==
Arveladze was included in the squad of hosts Georgia for the 2017 UEFA European Under-19 Championship, where the team were eliminated in the group stage. He was called up to the senior national team for the first time in March 2019 for the UEFA Euro 2020 qualifying matches against Switzerland and the Republic of Ireland. He made his debut on 26 March 2019, when he started in the game against Ireland.

== Personal life ==
Arveladze is the son of retired professional footballer Revaz Arveladze. Vato was born in the German city of Homburg, Saarland, where his father played. Both of his father's younger twin brothers, Shota and Archil, were also professional footballers, with all three appearing for the Georgia national team. Shota, now a manager, is the all-time top scorer for Georgia, having scored 26 goals for the country.

== Career statistics ==
As of 26 March 2019

Appearances and goals by national team and year
National team	Year	Apps	Goals
Georgia	2019	2	1
Total		2	1

Scores and results list Georgia's goal tally first, score column indicates score after each Arveladze goal.

List of international goals scored by Vato Arveladze
No.	Date	Venue	Opponent	Score	Result	Competition
1	7 June 2019	Boris Paichadze Dinamo Arena, Tbilisi, Georgia	Gibraltar	3–0	3–0	UEFA Euro 2020 qualification
