= Lasha Nozadze =

Georgian footballer

Personal information
- Date of birth: 18 March 1980 (age 46)
- Place of birth: Tbilisi, Georgia
- Height: 1.84 m (6 ft 1/2 in)
- Position: Central midfielder

Team information
- Current team: Dinamo Tbilisi (assistant coach)

Senior career*
Years	Team	Apps	(Gls)
1997–2004	WIT Georgia	203	(20)
2005–2007	Dinamo Tbilisi	55	(2)
2007–2008	Shakhter Karagandy	28	(1)
2009	Gagra Tbilisi	7	(1)
2009–2011	Sioni Bolnisi	57	(1)
2011–2012	Chikhura Sachkhere	16	(4)

International career
1999–2001	Georgia U21	4	(0)
2001	Georgia	1	(0)

Managerial career
- 2022: Saburtalo
- 2022–: Dinamo Tbilisi (assistant coach)
- * Club domestic league appearances and goals

Lasha Nozadze (Georgian: ლაშა ნოზაძე, born 18 March 1980) is a retired Georgian professional football player.
