= Aleksandr Verulidze =

Russian footballer (born 1996)

Personal information
- Full name: Aleksandr Lashayevich Verulidze
- Date of birth: 25 September 1996 (age 30)
- Height: 1.83 m (6 ft 0 in)
- Position: Striker

Team information
- Current team: Samgurali Tskaltubo
- Number: 17

Senior career*
Years	Team	Apps	(Gls)
2015	Trud Tikhoretsk		
2016–2017	SKA Khabarovsk	0	(0)
2017–2018	Fakel Voronezh	16	(0)
2018–2019	Mashuk-KMV Pyatigorsk	21	(3)
2019	Rotor Volgograd	0	(0)
2019–2020	Fakel Voronezh	7	(0)
2020	Guria Lanchkhuti		
2021–	Samgurali Tskaltubo	91	(6)
- * Club domestic league appearances and goals as of 11 December 2024

Aleksandr Lashayevich Verulidze (Russian: Александр Лашаевич Верулидзе; born 25 September 1996) is a Russian football player. He plays in Georgia for Samgurali Tskaltubo.

== Club career ==
He made his professional debut in the Russian Cup game for FC SKA-Khabarovsk on 24 August 2016 in a game against FC Sakhalin Yuzhno-Sakhalinsk.

He made his Russian Football National League debut for FC Fakel Voronezh on 30 July 2017 in a game against FC Sibir Novosibirsk.

On 14 June 2019 he was signed by FC Rotor Volgograd. On 8 July he left Rotor.

== Personal life ==
His father Lasha Verulidze has been a football referee at Russian second-tier since 2003.
