= Jemal Tabidze =

Georgian footballer

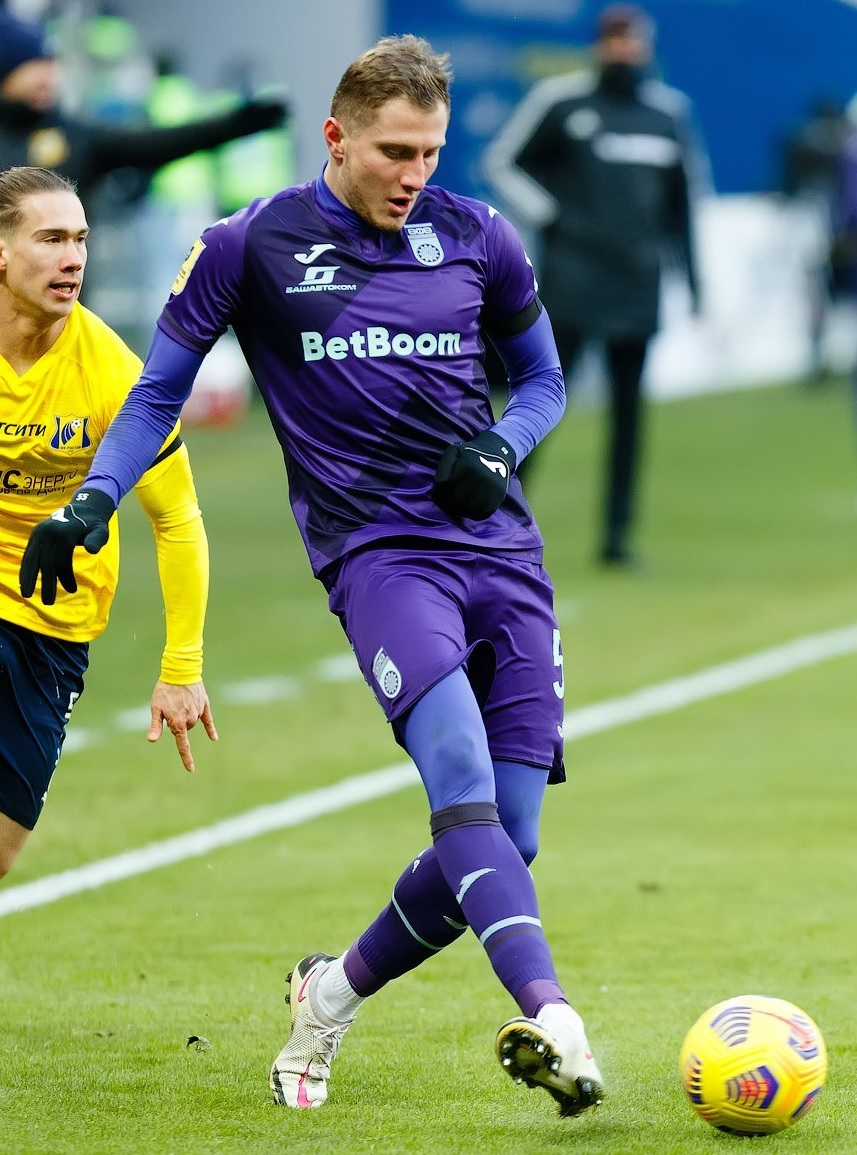
- Tabidze with FC Ufa in 2020

Personal information
- Date of birth: 18 March 1996 (age 30)
- Place of birth: Samtredia, Georgia
- Height: 1.87 m (6 ft 2 in)
- Position: Centre-back

Team information
- Current team: Kayserispor
- Number: 3

Youth career
- 2011–2013: Saburtalo Tbilisi
- 2015–2017: Gent

Senior career*
| Years | Team | Apps | (Gls) |
| 2013–2015 | Saburtalo Tbilisi | 37 | (2) |
| 2015–2017 | Gent | 0 | (0) |
| 2017 | → Ural Yekaterinburg (loan) | 3 | (0) |
| 2017–2022 | Ufa | 79 | (1) |
| 2022 | Kortrijk | 0 | (0) |
| 2022–2023 | Dinamo Tbilisi | 28 | (0) |
| 2024 | Panetolikos | 6 | (1) |
| 2024–2026 | Dynamo Makhachkala | 45 | (1) |
| 2026– | Kayserispor | 1 | (0) |

International career^{‡}
| 2012–2013 | Georgia U17 | 6 | (0) |
| 2015 | Georgia U19 | 3 | (0) |
| 2016–2017 | Georgia U21 | 8 | (0) |
| 2017– | Georgia | 16 | (1) |
- * Club domestic league appearances and goals as of 9 August 2026 ‡ National team caps and goals as of 26 September 2026

Jemal "Jimmy" Tabidze (Order of Honor) (Georgian: ჯემალ "ჯიმი" ტაბიძე, romanized: jemal "jimi" t'abidze, pronounced [dʒemal dʒimi tʼabidze]; born 18 March 1996) is a Georgian professional footballer who plays as centre-back for Turkish TFF 1. Lig club Kayserispor and the Georgia national team.

== Club career ==
After beginning his career in Pirveli Liga with FC Saburtalo Tbilisi, Tabidze joined the Belgian club K.A.A. Gent in July 2015. He played for the reserves team, not making any first-team appearances.

On 14 February 2017, Tabidze joined the Russian Premier League club FC Ural Yekaterinburg on loan until the end of the 2016–17 season.

On 1 July 2017, Tabidze signed a long-term contract with FC Ufa. On 30 March 2022, Tabidze terminated his contract with Ufa by mutual consent.

On 11 June 2022, Tabidze returned to Belgium and signed a two-year contract with Kortrijk. On 15 July 2022, his contract with Kortrijk was terminated by mutual consent before the season started, with the club explaining it by lack of match fitness, allowing Tabidze to join FC Dinamo Tbilisi. On 12 September 2023, Dinamo Tbilisi announced that Tabidze had left the club after his contract was terminated by mutual agreement.

In January 2024, Tabidze joined Super League Greece club Panetolikos on an eighteen-month contract with the option for a further year.

On 30 July 2024, Tabidze returned to the Russian Premier League and signed with FC Dynamo Makhachkala. He left Dynamo Makhachkala in June 2026 as his contract expired.

On 7 August 2026, Tabidze transferred to Kayserispor in Turkey for two seasons.

== International career ==
Tabidze made his debut for the Georgia national football team on 23 January 2017 in a friendly against Uzbekistan.

== Career statistics ==
=== Club ===
As of match played 23 May 2026

Appearances and goals by club, season and competition
| Club | Season | League | | | Cup | | Continental | | Other | | Total | |
| Club | Season | Division | Apps | Goals | Apps | Goals | Apps | Goals | Apps | Goals | Apps | Goals |
|---|---|---|---|---|---|---|---|---|---|---|---|---|
| Saburtalo Tbilisi | 2013–14 | Erovnuli Liga 2 | 18 | 0 | 0 | 0 | — | | — | | 18 | 0 |
| Saburtalo Tbilisi | 2014–15 | Erovnuli Liga 2 | 19 | 2 | 1 | 0 | — | | — | | 20 | 2 |
| Saburtalo Tbilisi | Total | | 37 | 2 | 1 | 0 | 0 | 0 | — | | 38 | 2 |
| Ural Yekaterinburg | 2016–17 | Russian Premier League | 3 | 0 | 1 | 0 | — | | — | | 4 | 0 |
| Ufa | 2017–18 | Russian Premier League | 20 | 0 | 1 | 0 | — | | — | | 21 | 0 |
| Ufa | 2018–19 | Russian Premier League | 12 | 0 | 1 | 0 | 6 (Note: Appearance(s) in the UEFA Europa League) | 0 | 0 | 0 | 19 | 0 |
| Ufa | 2019–20 | Russian Premier League | 25 | 1 | 1 | 0 | — | | — | | 26 | 1 |
| Ufa | 2020–21 | Russian Premier League | 22 | 0 | 2 | 0 | — | | — | | 24 | 0 |
| Ufa | 2021–22 | Russian Premier League | 0 | 0 | 0 | 0 | — | | — | | 0 | 0 |
| Ufa | Total | | 79 | 1 | 5 | 0 | 6 | 0 | 0 | 0 | 90 | 1 |
| Dinamo Tbilisi | 2022 | Erovnuli Liga | 12 | 0 | 3 | 0 | — | | — | | 15 | 0 |
| Dinamo Tbilisi | 2023 | Erovnuli Liga | 16 | 0 | 0 | 0 | 3 (Note: Two appearances in UEFA Champions League, one appearance in UEFA Conference League) | 0 | 2 (Note: Appearance(s) in the Georgian Super Cup) | 0 | 21 | 0 |
| Dinamo Tbilisi | Total | | 28 | 0 | 3 | 0 | 3 | 0 | 2 | 0 | 36 | 0 |
| Kortrijk (loan) | 2022–23 | Belgian Pro League | 0 | 0 | 0 | 0 | — | | 0 | 0 | 0 | 0 |
| Panetolikos | 2023–24 | Super League Greece | 6 | 0 | 1 | 0 | — | | — | | 7 | 0 |
| Dynamo Makhachkala | 2024–25 | Russian Premier League | 19 | 0 | 1 | 0 | — | | — | | 20 | 0 |
| Dynamo Makhachkala | 2025–26 | Russian Premier League | 26 | 1 | 6 | 0 | — | | 2 (Note: Appearances in relegation play-offs) | 0 | 34 | 1 |
| Dynamo Makhachkala | Total | | 45 | 1 | 7 | 0 | 0 | 0 | 2 | 0 | 54 | 1 |
| Career total | | | 198 | 4 | 18 | 0 | 9 | 0 | 4 | 0 | 229 | 4 |

=== International ===
Scores and results list Georgia's goal tally first, score column indicates score after each Tabidze goal.

List of international goals scored by Jemal Tabidze
| No. | Date | Venue | Opponent | Score | Result | Competition |
|---|---|---|---|---|---|---|
| 1 | 27 March 2018 | Mikheil Meskhi Stadium, Tbilisi, Georgia | Estonia | 1–0 | 2–0 | Friendly |
