= Francis Nzaba =

Moroccan footballer

Personal information
- Full name: Francis Beny Nzaba
- Date of birth: 17 July 2002 (age 24)
- Place of birth: Brazzaville, Congo
- Height: 1.78 m (5 ft 10 in)
- Position: Centre-back

Team information
- Current team: Antalyaspor
- Number: 15

Youth career
- Diables Noirs

Senior career*
Years	Team	Apps	(Gls)
2021–2022	Diables Noirs	0	(0)
2022–2026	İstanbul Başakşehir	2	(0)
2023	→ Dinamo Tbilisi (loan)	9	(0)
2023–2024	→ Gençlerbirliği (loan)	31	(0)
2024–2026	→ Esenler Erokspor (loan)	66	(2)
2026–	Antalyaspor	10	(0)

International career^{‡}
2022–	Congo	3	(0)
- * Club domestic league appearances and goals as of 6 November 2026 ‡ National team caps and goals as of 10 September 2026

Francis Beny Nzaba (born 17 July 2002) is a Congolese professional footballer who plays as a centre-back for Turkish TFF 1. Lig club Antalyaspor.

== Professional career ==
Nzaba began his senior career with the Diables Noirs in the 2021–22 season making 4 appearances in the CAF Confederation Cup that season. He transferred to the Turkish club İstanbul Başakşehir on 9 May 2022 on a three-year contract. He made his professional debut with Başakşehir as a late substitute in a 2–0 Süper Lig win over Antalyaspor on 27 December 2022.

On 24 January 2023, Nzaba was loaned by Dinamo Tbilisi in Georgia until the end of 2023.

On 21 August 2026, he transferred to Süper Lig club Antalyaspor.

== International career ==
Nzaba made his international debut with the Congo national team in a friendly 2–1 loss to Sierra Leone on 29 March 2022.

== Honours ==
Diables Noirs

- Coupe du Congo: 2021–22
