= Andrés Carrasco (football manager) =

Spanish football manager (born 1978)

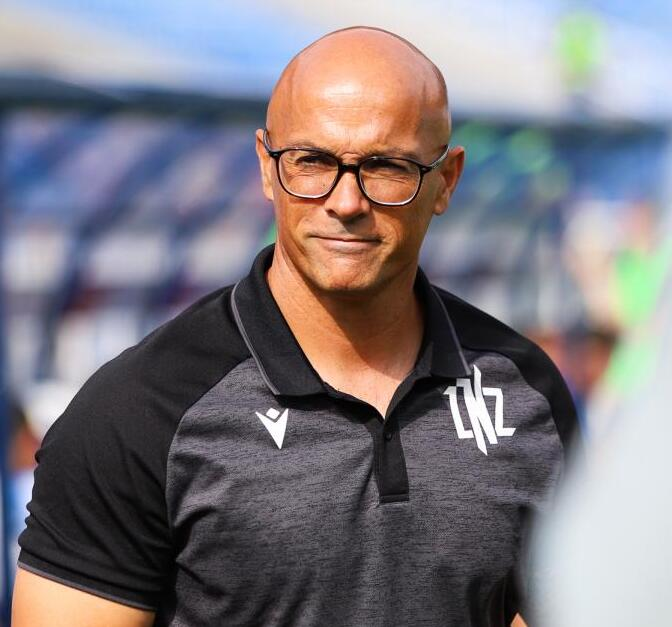

Personal information
- Full name: Andrés Rubén Carrasco Carrillo
- Date of birth: 4 March 1978 (age 48)
- Place of birth: Olèrdola, Spain

Team information
- Current team: LNZ Cherkasy

Managerial career
- Years: Team
- 1999–2011: Barcelona (youth)
- 2011–2012: Dinamo Tbilisi (youth)
- 2012–2013: Málaga (youth)
- 2014–2015: Sabadell (assistant)
- 2015–2017: Western Sydney Wanderers (assistant)
- 2017: Karabükspor (assistant)
- 2018–2019: Shakhtar Donetsk U19
- 2020: Kuwait U19
- 2020–2021: Kuwait
- 2021–2022: Kuwait U19
- 2022–2023: Dinamo Tbilisi (academy)
- 2023–2024: Dinamo Tbilisi
- 2024: LNZ Cherkasy

Andrés Carrasco Carrillo (born 4 March 1978) is a Spanish football manager.

== Career ==
Born in Sant Miquel d'Olèrdola, Olèrdola, Barcelona, Catalonia, Carrasco worked for 11 years at FC Barcelona's La Masia, managing the under-9, under-12 and under-14 squads. In June 2011, he moved abroad and joined Georgia's FC Dinamo Tbilisi as a director of the youth categories.

Carrasco returned to his home nation in 2012, taking over Málaga CF's Cadete A squad and leading the side to two accolades. On 15 July 2013, he returned to Georgia after being appointed director of the youth setup at FC Saburtalo Tbilisi.

On 24 November 2014, Carrasco was named assistant manager of Álex García (whom he worked with at Dinamo Tbilisi) at CE Sabadell FC. He left the club the following February, as the manager resigned, and joined Western Sydney Wanderers FC on 14 July 2015.

Carrasco re-signed for the Wanderers in January 2016, remaining at the club until February 2017 after accepting an offer from Kardemir Karabükspor. On 6 July 2018, he switched teams and countries again after being appointed manager of FC Shakhtar Donetsk's under-19 squad. He managed the latter side in the 2019–20 UEFA Youth League, being knocked out in the group stage.

On 10 November 2020, one month after being named manager of the under-19 team, Carrasco was named manager of the Kuwait national team as well as the Kuwait U19 team.

On 4 August 2023, Dinamo Tbilisi announced the appointment of Carrasco as Head Coach after Giorgi Tchiabrishvili had left the club. On 7 June 2024 Carrasco left his role as Head Coach of Dinamo Tbilisi.

On 11 June 2024 Carrasco signed a contract as a manager of the Ukrainian Premier League club LNZ Cherkasy returning to Ukraine.

== Managerial statistics ==
As of match played 1 June 2024

Managerial record by team and tenure
Team	Nat	From	To	Record							
Team	Nat	From	To	G	W	D	L	GF	GA	GD	Win %
Kuwait	(Kuwait)	10 November 2020	1 October 2021	6	0	2	4	2	8	−6	0.00
Dinamo Tbilisi	(Georgia (country))	5 August 2023	7 June 2024	38	18	12	8	70	41	+29	47.37
Total				44	18	14	12	72	49	+23	40.91
