= Levan Kakubava =

Georgian footballer (born 1990)

Personal information
- Date of birth: 15 October 1990 (age 36)
- Place of birth: Tbilisi, Georgia
- Height: 1.84 m (6 ft 1/2 in)
- Position: Centre back

Team information
- Current team: Guria
- Number: 2

Youth career
- 2005–2008: Dinamo Tbilisi

Senior career*
| Years | Team | Apps | (Gls) |
| 2007–2008 | → Borjomi (loan) | 9 | (0) |
| 2008–2013 | Dinamo Tbilisi | 94 | (3) |
| 2013–2014 | Metalurgi Rustavi | 14 | (1) |
| 2014 | Spartaki Tskhinvali | 14 | (1) |
| 2014 | Omonia | 0 | (0) |
| 2014–2015 | Samtredia | 21 | (3) |
| 2015–2016 | Tskhinvali | 28 | (3) |
| 2016–2019 | Chikhura Sachkhere | 63 | (4) |
| 2019–2022 | Saburtalo | 102 | (1) |
| 2023–2024 | Gagra | 39 | (0) |
| 2025 | Samtredia | 16 | (0) |
| 2026– | Guria | 24 | (1) |

International career^{‡}
| 2008–2009 | Georgia U19 | 6 | (1) |
| 2009–2011 | Georgia U21 | 13 | (0) |
| 2010– | Georgia | 4 | (0) |
- * Club domestic league appearances and goals as of 3 November 2026 ‡ National team caps and goals as of 29 October 2011

Levan Kakubava (Georgian: ლევან კაკუბავა; born 15 October 1990) is a Georgian football player, currently playing for Liga 3 side Guria as a centre back.

He is the winner of the national league with Dinamo Tbilisi and four-time winner of the Georgian Cup.

In January 2023, Kakubava joined Gagra and became its captain.

== Career statistics (Dinamo Tbilisi) ==
| Club | Season | League | | Cup | | Continental | | Total |
| Club | Season | Apps | Goals | Apps | Goals | Apps | Goals | Apps | Goals |
|---|---|---|---|---|---|---|---|---|---|
| FC Dinamo Tbilisi | 2008–09 | 6 | 0 | 2 | 0 | 0 | 0 | 8 | 0 |
| FC Dinamo Tbilisi | 2009–10 | 27 | 0 | 6 | 0 | 3 | 0 | 35 | 0 |
| FC Dinamo Tbilisi | 2010–11 | 34 | 2 | 3 | 0 | 6 | 0 | 43 | 2 |
| FC Dinamo Tbilisi | 2011–12 | 7 | 1 | 0 | 0 | 7 | 0 | 14 | 1 |
| FC Dinamo Tbilisi | 2012–13 | 1 | 0 | 0 | 0 | 0 | 0 | 1 | 0 |
| FC Dinamo Tbilisi | Total | 75 | 3 | 11 | 0 | 16 | 0 | 102 | 3 |
| Career Total | | 75 | 3 | 11 | 0 | 16 | 0 | 102 | 3 |

(Last edit: 25 August 2012)

== Honours ==
Erovnuli Liga (1): 2012–13

Georgian Cup (4): 2012–13, 2017, 2019, 2021

Super Cup (1): 2020
