= Giorgi Kharaishvili =

Georgian footballer (born 1996)

Personal information
- Date of birth: 29 July 1996 (age 30)
- Place of birth: Marneuli, Georgia
- Height: 1.83 m (6 ft 0 in)
- Positions: Winger; attacking midfielder

Team information
- Current team: Dinamo Tbilisi
- Number: 10

Youth career
- 2011–2013: Saburtalo Tbilisi

Senior career*
Years	Team	Apps	(Gls)
2013–2018	Saburtalo Tbilisi	112	(55)
2018	→ IFK Göteborg (loan)	27	(9)
2019–2020	IFK Göteborg	43	(9)
2021–2024	Ferencváros	5	(1)
2023–2024	→ Dinamo Tbilisi (loan)	31	(8)
2024	Kocaelispor	9	(0)
2024–2025	Sumgayit	21	(1)
2025–	Dinamo Tbilisi	13	(2)

International career^{‡}
2012–2013	Georgia U17	7	(0)
2014–2015	Georgia U19	6	(0)
2015–2018	Georgia U21	18	(5)
2017–	Georgia	6	(1)
- * Club domestic league appearances and goals as of 10 December 2025 ‡ National team caps and goals as of 19 November 2019

Giorgi Kharaishvili (Georgian: გიორგი ხარაიშვილი; born 29 July 1996) is a Georgian professional footballer who plays as a winger or attacking midfielder for Erovnuli Liga club Dinamo Tbilisi.

== Club career ==
Kharaishvili began his career in FC Saburtalo Tbilisi. He moved to IFK Göteborg in February 2018.

On 21 February 2023, Kharaishvili moved on loan to Dinamo Tbilisi.

On 18 September 2024, the Azerbaijan Premier League club Sumgayit signed a 1+2 year contract with Kharaishvili. On 28 July 2025, Sumgayit announced the departure of Kharaishvili after his contract had expired.

On 1 August 2025, Dinamo Tbilisi announced the signing of Kharaishvili.

== International career ==
Kharaishvili made his debut for the Georgia national team on 23 January 2017 in a friendly against Uzbekistan.

== Career statistics ==
Scores and results list Georgia's goal tally first, score column indicates score after each Kharaishvili goal.

List of international goals scored by Giorgi Kharaishvili
No.	Date	Venue	Opponent	Score	Result	Competition
1	15 October 2019	Victoria Stadium, Gibraltar	Gibraltar	1–0	3–2	UEFA Euro 2020 qualification

== Honours ==
Saburtalo Tbilisi

- Erovnuli Liga:2018
- Erovnuli Liga 2: 2014–15

IFK Göteborg

- Svenska Cupen: 2019–20

Ferencváros

- Nemzeti Bajnokság I: 2021–22
- Magyar Kupa: 2021–22
