= Flamarion (footballer, born 1996) =

Brazilian footballer (born 1996)

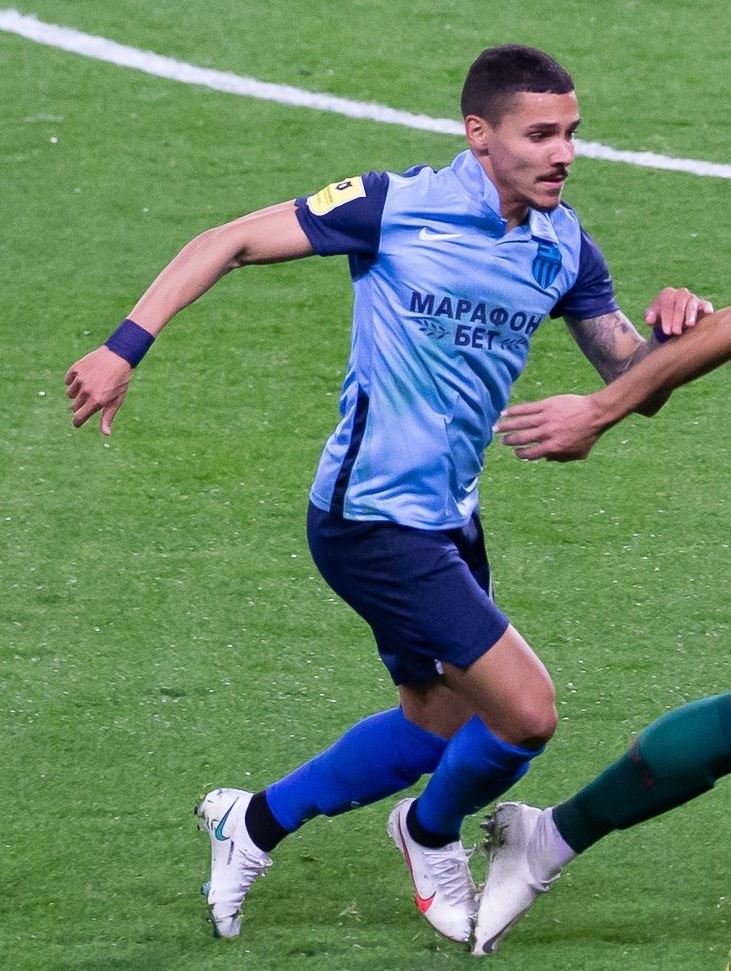
- Flamarion with Rotor Volgograd in 2020

Personal information
- Full name: Flamarion Jovino Filho
- Date of birth: 30 July 1996 (age 30)
- Place of birth: Brazil
- Height: 1.71 m (5 ft 7 in)
- Position: Forward

Team information
- Current team: Pakhtakor
- Number: 50

Youth career
- 2013–2016: Palmeiras

Senior career*
| Years | Team | Apps | (Gls) |
| 2016–2017 | Lovćen | 5 | (0) |
| 2017–2023 | Dinamo Batumi | 171 | (83) |
| 2020–2021 | → Rotor Volgograd (loan) | 20 | (4) |
| 2023–2024 | Valenciennes | 30 | (5) |
| 2025– | Pakhtakor | 43 | (9) |
- * Club domestic league appearances and goals as of 3 November 2026

Flamarion Jovino Filho (born 30 July 1996), known as Flamarion Junior or simply Flamarion, is a Brazilian professional footballer who plays as a forward for Uzbekistan Super League club Pakhtakor.

== Club career ==
=== Dinamo Batumi ===
In 2017 Flamarion played 21 games for Dinamo Batumi without scoring. In 2018, he became the top goalscorer by netting 24 goals in 31 games and gained recognition as the best player in the 2nd division. The next season, being in the top league now, he scored 17 goals in 30 games and won a nomination for Player of the Year.

==== Loan to Rotor Volgograd ====
On 7 September 2020, he joined Russian Premier League club FC Rotor Volgograd on loan. He made his Russian Premier League debut for Rotor on 27 September 2020 in a game against FC Rubin Kazan and scored a goal in a 1–3 home defeat.

==== Return to Batumi ====
At the end of 2021 Flamarion received the Georgian citizenship.

During the 2022 season, he was multiple times named in different symbolic teams. In a nine-game first quarter he received the best player's award after nine goals and two assists. Following the second phase of the league, Flamarion was included among the best XI players. Overall, this year he scored 19 goals and became both the top goalscorer and the player of the season.

Flamarion continued his impressive performance in 2023. With 13 goals in 18 matches at half season, he was the leading goalscorer again and a vital contributor to his team who topped the league with a four-point margin. The Erovnuli Liga named Flamarion the player of the first phase consisting of initial nine games. At the end of the season, he was once again recognized Player of the Season.

=== Valenciennes ===
On 13 December 2023, Ligue 2 club Valenciennes, announced the signing of Flamarion.

=== Pakhtakor ===
On 14 January 2025, Flamarion signed with Uzbekistan Super League club Pakhtakor.

== Career statistics ==
=== Club ===
As of match played 2 November 2026

Appearances and goals by club, season and competition
| Club | Season | League | | | National Cup | | Continental | | Other | | Total | |
| Club | Season | Division | Apps | Goals | Apps | Goals | Apps | Goals | Apps | Goals | Apps | Goals |
|---|---|---|---|---|---|---|---|---|---|---|---|---|
| Lovćen | 2016/17 | Montenegrin First League | 5 | 0 | 1 | 0 | — | | — | | 6 | 0 |
| Dinamo Batumi | 2017 | Erovnuli Liga | 22 | 0 | 1 | 0 | 0 (Note: Appearances in the UEFA Europa League) | 0 | - | | 23 | 0 |
| Dinamo Batumi | 2018 | Erovnuli Liga 2 | 32 | 24 | 1 | 0 | - | | - | | 33 | 24 |
| Dinamo Batumi | 2019 | Erovnuli Liga | 30 | 17 | 1 | 0 | - | | - | | 31 | 17 |
| Dinamo Batumi | 2020 | Erovnuli Liga | 8 | 4 | 0 | 0 | 1 | 0 | - | | 9 | 4 |
| Dinamo Batumi | 2021 | Erovnuli Liga | 18 | 2 | 2 | 0 | 6 (Note: Appearances in the UEFA Europa Conference League) | 2 | - | | 26 | 4 |
| Dinamo Batumi | 2022 | Erovnuli Liga | 29 | 19 | 0 | 0 | 4 (Note: Appearances in the UEFA Champions League and UEFA Conference League) | 0 | 1 (Note: Appearance in the Georgian Super Cup) | 0 | 33 | 19 |
| Dinamo Batumi | 2023 | Erovnuli Liga | 32 | 17 | 3 | 2 | 2 | 1 | 2 | 1 | 39 | 21 |
| Dinamo Batumi | Total | | 171 | 83 | 8 | 2 | 13 | 3 | 3 | 1 | 195 | 89 |
| Rotor (loan) | 2020/21 | Russian Premier League | 20 | 4 | 0 | 0 | — | | — | | 20 | 4 |
| Valenciennes | 2023–24 | Ligue 2 | 19 | 2 | 4 | 0 | — | | — | | 23 | 2 |
| Valenciennes | 2024–25 | Championnat National | 11 | 3 | 3 | 0 | — | | — | | 14 | 3 |
| Valenciennes | Total | | 30 | 5 | 7 | 0 | - | - | - | - | 37 | 5 |
| Pakhtakor | 2025 | Uzbekistan Super League | 20 | 3 | 4 | 2 | 4 (Note: Appearance in the AFC Champions League Elite) | 1 | — | | 28 | 6 |
| Pakhtakor | 2026 | Uzbekistan Super League | 23 | 6 | 4 | 1 | 4 | 1 | 1 (Note: Appearance in the Uzbekistan Super Cup) | 0 | 32 | 8 |
| Pakhtakor | Total | | 43 | 9 | 8 | 3 | 8 | 2 | 1 | 0 | 60 | 14 |
| Career total | | | 269 | 101 | 24 | 5 | 21 | 5 | 4 | 1 | 318 | 112 |

== Honours ==
=== Team ===
Erovnuli Liga

- Winner (2): 2021, 2023
- Runner-up (2): 2019, 2022

Georgian Super Cup

- Winner (1): 2022

Erovnuli Liga 2

- Winner (1): 2018

=== Individual ===
Player of the Season

- Erovnuli Liga 2: 2018
- Erovnuli Liga: 2019, 2022, 2023

Top goalscorer

- Erovnuli Liga 2: 2018
- Erovnuli Liga: 2022, 2023 (shared)
