= Barnes Osei =

Ghanaian footballer

Personal information
- Date of birth: 8 January 1995 (age 31)
- Place of birth: Accra, Ghana
- Height: 1.79 m (5 ft 10 in)
- Position: Right winger

Team information
- Current team: Dinamo Tbilisi
- Number: 24

Youth career
- 2012–2014: Pacos Ferreira

Senior career*
| Years | Team | Apps | (Gls) |
| 2013–2019 | Pacos Ferreira | 67 | (7) |
| 2015 | → União Madeira (loan) | 12 | (1) |
| 2016–2017 | → Arouca (loan) | 14 | (1) |
| 2019–2020 | Académica | 22 | (2) |
| 2020–2021 | Nea Salamina | 34 | (3) |
| 2021–2023 | Dinamo Tbilisi | 66 | (9) |
| 2024 | Astana | 14 | (0) |
| 2025 | Bnei Sakhnin | 11 | (1) |
| 2025– | Dinamo Tbilisi | 13 | (1) |

International career
| 2015 | Ghana U20 | 3 | (0) |
- * Club domestic league appearances and goals as of 10 December 2025

Barnes Osei (born 8 January 1995), simply known as Barnes, is a Ghanaian professional footballer who plays for Erovnuli Liga club Dinamo Tbilisi as a right winger.

== Career ==
On 5 July 2021, Erovnuli Liga club Dinamo Tbilisi announced the signing of Osei to an eighteen-month contract.

On 16 January 2024, Kazakhstan Premier League club Astana announced the signing of Osei to a one-year contract, with the option of an additional year. On 19 January 2025, Astana announced that Osei would be leaving the club after his contract had expired, and they had not exercised their option to extended it for an additional year.
