= Davit Skhirtladze =

Georgian footballer (born 1993)

Personal information
- Date of birth: 16 March 1993 (age 33)
- Place of birth: Tbilisi, Georgia
- Height: 1.87 m (6 ft 2 in)
- Positions: Forward; left winger

Team information
- Current team: Pohronie
- Number: 13

Youth career
- 2007–2011: Sasco Tbilisi

Senior career*
Years	Team	Apps	(Gls)
2011–2015	AGF	71	(5)
2016–2018	Silkeborg	75	(19)
2018	Spartak Trnava	8	(0)
2019	Riga	2	(0)
2019–2020	Arka Gdynia	22	(4)
2020	Dinamo Tbilisi	5	(3)
2021	Viborg	14	(0)
2021–2024	Dinamo Tbilisi	65	(21)
2024	→ Kocaelispor (loan)	8	(0)
2025	Iberia 1999	9	(1)
2025–2026	Gareji Sagarejo	12	(2)
2026	Pohronie	11	(3)

International career
2009–2010	Georgia U17	6	(2)
2011–2012	Georgia U19	6	(3)
2012–2013	Georgia U21	7	(3)
2016–2017	Georgia	4	(0)
- * Club domestic league appearances and goals as of 25 May 2026

Davit Skhirtladze (Georgian: დავით სხირტლაძე; born 16 March 1993) is a Georgian professional footballer who plays as a midfielder for Slovak 2. Liga club Pohronie.

== Club career ==
Skhirtladze started training with the Danish side AGF in January 2011. After several months with reserve squad, he was eventually granted professional contract and joined the first-team.

In January 2016, Skhirtladze joined Silkeborg on a free transfer. He left the club after a mutual agreement in September 2018.

On 12 February 2021, Skhirtladze returned to Denmark and joined Danish 1st Division club Viborg FF on a deal for the rest of the season. He left Viborg again at the end of the season.

On 15 January 2025, Dinamo Tbilisi announced that Skhirtladze had left the club after his contract had expired.

== Career statistics ==
As of 5 July 2019

Club	Season	Division	League		Cup		Europe		Other		Total	
Club	Season	Division	Apps	Goals	Apps	Goals	Apps	Goals	Apps	Goals	Apps	Goals
AGF	2011–12	Superliga	14	0	1	0	0	0	–		15	0
AGF	2012–13	Superliga	20	2	0	0	1	0	–		21	2
AGF	2013–14	Superliga	13	0	2	0	0	0	–		15	0
AGF	2014–15	1st Division	18	3	0	0	0	0	–		18	3
AGF	2015–16	Superliga	6	0	2	1	0	0	–		8	1
AGF	Total		71	5	5	1	1	0	0	0	77	6
Silkeborg	2015–16	1st Division	13	6	0	0	0	0	–		13	6
Silkeborg	2016–17	Superliga	30	7	1	0	0	0	2	0	33	7
Silkeborg	2017–18	Superliga	29	6	4	4	0	0	6	2	39	12
Silkeborg	2018–19	1st Division	3	0	0	0	0	0	–		3	0
Silkeborg	Total		75	19	5	4	0	0	8	2	88	25
Spartak Trnava	2018–19	Slovak First Football League	8	0	3	1	4	0	–		15	1
Riga	2019	Latvian Higher League	2	0	0	0	0	0	–		2	0
Career total			156	24	13	6	5	0	8	2	182	32
