= Erosi Manjgaladze Stadium =

Coordinates: 42.1608°N 42.3306°E

- Interactive map of Erosi Manjgaladze Stadium
- Full name: Erosi Manjgaladze Stadium
- Location: Samtredia, Georgia
- Capacity: 15,000

Tenant
- FC Samtredia

Erosi Manjgaladze Stadium is a multi-use stadium in Samtredia, Georgia. It is used mostly for football matches and hosts the home games of FC Samtredia of the Umaglesi Liga. The capacity of the stadium is 15,000 spectators. The stadium is named after the late Georgian actor Erosi Manjgaladze, who was born in the Samtredia Municipality.
