= Imran Oulad Omar =

Dutch footballer (born 1997)

Imran Oulad Omar عمران ولاد عمر
Personal information
- Date of birth: 11 December 1997 (age 28)
- Place of birth: Amsterdam, Netherlands
- Height: 1.86 m (6 ft 1 in)
- Position: Midfielder

Team information
- Current team: Dinamo Batumi
- Number: 18

Youth career
- 2004–2012: AFC DWS
- 2012–2013: RKSV DCG
- 2013–2014: AFC DWS
- 2014–2015: Heerenveen
- 2015–2016: A.V.V. Zeeburgia

Senior career*
Years	Team	Apps	(Gls)
2016–2017	Achilles '29	36	(6)
2018	AS Trenčín	3	(0)
2018–2019	Den Bosch	17	(3)
2019–2020	Academica Clinceni	2	(0)
2020–2022	Locomotive Tbilisi	44	(10)
2022	Rotor Volgograd	9	(1)
2022–2023	Dinamo Tbilisi	37	(21)
2023–2024	Hapoel Be'er Sheva	23	(2)
2024–2026	Noah	36	(11)
2026–	Dinamo Batumi	1	(0)
- * Club domestic league appearances and goals as of 18 June 2026

Imran Ouulad Omar (Arabic: عمران ولاد عمر; born 11 December 1997) is a Dutch professional footballer who plays as an attacking midfielder for Erovnuli Liga club Dinamo Batumi. Besides the Netherlands, he has played in Slovakia, Romania, Georgia, Russia, Israel and Armenia.

== Club career ==
He made his professional debut in the Eerste Divisie for Achilles '29 on 21 October 2016 in a game against Waalwijk.

In 2020, Imran moved to Georgian club Locomotive where he spent three seasons. Following a brief period at Rotor, he joined Dinamo Tbilisi in June 2022.

In 2026, Imran returned to Georgia to play for a third team under coach Giorgi Chiabrishvili. He joined Dinamo Batumi on a year-long deal signed on 12 July.
