= 2025 FC Dinamo Tbilisi season =

FC Dinamo Tbilisi
2025 season
- Chairman: Roman Pipia
- Manager: Vladimir Kakashvili
- Stadium: Boris Paichadze Dinamo Arena
- Erovnuli Liga: 4th
- Georgian Cup: Round of 16 vs Samtredia
- Top goalscorer: League: Tornike Morchiladze (12); All: Tornike Morchiladze (12)
Home colours	Away colours	Third colours

The 2025 FC Dinamo Tbilisi season was the thirty-seventh successive season that FC Dinamo Tbilisi played in the top flight of Georgian football.

== Season events ==
On 18 December 2024, Dinamo Tbilisi announced the appointment of Vladimir Kakashvili as their new head coach for the 2025 season.

On 29 December 2024, Dinamo announced the return signing of Jaba Kankava on a one-year contract.

On 4 January, Dinamo announced the return of Tornike Morchiladze from Telavi, and that he had signed a new one-year contract.

On 12 January, Dinamo announced that Mate Vatsadze had extended his contract with the club for another year, and that Nodar Lominadze, Irakli Iakobidze and Otar Aptsiauri had all returned from their respective loans.

On 16 January, Dinamo announced that Ștefan Sicaci had returned to the club after previously playing for Dinamo between 2018 and 2019.

On 18 January, Dinamo announced the signing of Daniel Owusu to a two-year contract from Samtredia, and the year-long loan signing of Léo Assunpção from PSTC.

On 19 January, Dinamo announced that Levan Osikmashvili had joined Hapoel Hadera on loan until the summer.

On 20 January, Dinamo announced the signing of John Arthur to a two-year contract from Felgueiras.

On 28 January, Dinamo announced that Aleksandre Kalandadze had joined Fehérvár on loan with an option to make the move permanent.

On 29 January, Dinamo announced the signing of free-agent Valerian Gvilia to a one-year contract.

On 3 February, Dinamo announced that Vasilios Gordeziani had joined Sarajevo on loan until the summer, with the Bosnian club having an option to make the move permanent.

On 15 February, Dinamo announced the signing of Nikoloz Kutateladze on loan from Pari NN until the end of the year.

On 4 March, Dinamo announced the signing of Bohdan Potalov to a two-year contract with the option of a third, and the signing of Adrian César from Fluminense to a one-year contract with the option of a second.

On 29 June, Dinamo announced the return of Giorgi Loria from Omonia Aradippou on a contract until the end of the season, and the singing of Giorgi Lomtadze after he'd left Bnei Yehuda Tel Aviv, on a contract until the summer of 2026.

On 11 July, Dinamo announced that Nikoloz Ugrekhelidze had joined Turkish Süper Lig club Fatih Karagümrük on a year-long loan deal.

On 18 July, Dinamo announced the signing of Honore Gomis from ML Vitebsk.

On 26 July, Dinamo announced the loan signings of Luka Latsabidze from Shakhtar Donetsk until the end of the season, and of Abdoulaye Yoro from İstanbul Başakşehir until the summer of 2026.

On 1 August, Dinamo announced the signing of Giorgi Kharaishvili, who'd last played for Sumgayit.

On 30 August, his 18th birthday, Vakhtang Salia left Dinamo to join Newcastle United, having previously agreed the deal in October 2024.

On 1 September, Nikoloz Chikovani left Dinamo to sign for EFL Championship club Watford.

== Squad ==
As of match played 30 November 2025

No.	Name	Nationality	Position	Date of birth (age)	Signed from	Signed in	Contract ends	Apps.	Goals
Goalkeepers
1	Ștefan Sicaci	(Moldova)	GK	8 September 1988 (aged 37)	Kaisar	2025	2025	30	0
37	Mikheil Makatsaria	(Georgia (country))	GK	11 June 2004 (aged 21)	Academy	2022		40	0
40	Giorgi Loria	(Georgia (country))	GK	27 January 1986 (aged 39)	Omonia Aradippou	2025	2025	298	0
Defenders
2	Giorgi Gvasalia	(Georgia (country))	DF	5 September 2007 (aged 18)	Academy	2024		24	1
3	Tengo Gobeshia	(Georgia (country))	DF	7 January 2005 (aged 20)	Academy	2024		1	0
4	Irakli Iakobidze	(Georgia (country))	DF	25 January 2002 (aged 23)	Academy	2021		30	1
5	Saba Kharebashvili	(Georgia (country))	DF	3 September 2008 (aged 17)	Academy	2024		58	0
14	Léo Assunpção	(Brazil)	DF	25 April 2002 (aged 23)	on loan from PSTC	2025	2025	23	4
15	Luka Latsabidze	(Georgia (country))	DF	18 March 2004 (aged 21)	on loan from Shakhtar Donetsk	2025	2025	17	1
16	Saba Akhalkatsi	(Georgia (country))	DF	21 July 2004 (aged 21)	Academy	2025		1	0
17	Bohdan Potalov	(Ukraine)	DF	12 August 2002 (aged 23)	Unattached	2025	2026 (+1)	18	0
39	Gela Sadghobelashvili	(Georgia (country))	DF	19 January 2005 (aged 20)	Academy	2025		12	0
41	Mate Shatirishvili	(Georgia (country))	DF	25 May 2008 (aged 17)	Academy	2025		7	0
Midfielders
6	Aleksandre Peikrishvili	(Georgia (country))	MF	14 June 2006 (aged 19)	on loan from Dynamo Kyiv	2025		2	0
8	Tsotne Berelidze	(Georgia (country))	MF	24 March 2006 (aged 19)	Academy	2023		46	0
9	Giorgi Lomtadze	(Georgia (country))	MF	30 October 2001 (aged 24)	Unattached	2025	2026	15	0
10	Giorgi Kharaishvili	(Georgia (country))	MF	29 July 1996 (aged 29)	Unattached	2025		51	10
11	Tornike Morchiladze	(Georgia (country))	MF	10 January 2002 (aged 23)	Telavi	2021	2025	30	12
13	Luka Tsulaia	(Georgia (country))	MF	13 March 2007 (aged 18)	Academy	2025		9	0
18	Valerian Gvilia	(Georgia (country))	MF	24 May 1994 (aged 31)	Unattached	2025	2025	14	2
21	Raul Baratelia	(Georgia (country))	MF	20 August 2004 (aged 21)	Academy	2025		0	0
22	Nika Ninua	(Georgia (country))	MF	22 June 1999 (aged 26)	Unattached	2024		146	19
23	Jaba Kankava	(Georgia (country))	MF	18 March 1986 (aged 39)	Unattached	2025	2025		
25	Luka Bubuteishvili	(Georgia (country))	MF	12 February 2006 (aged 19)	Academy	2024		2	0
26	Abdoulaye Yoro	(Ivory Coast)	MF	12 December 2006 (aged 18)	on loan from İstanbul Başakşehir	2025	2026	15	2
44	Lazare Natenadze	(Georgia (country))	MF	31 January 2007 (aged 18)	Academy	2025		0	0
45	Levan Nachkebia	(Georgia (country))	MF	30 March 2006 (aged 19)	Academy	2024		2	0
46	Saba Nioradze	(Georgia (country))	MF	16 January 2007 (aged 18)	Academy	2025		1	0
47	Honore Gomis	(Senegal)	MF	27 February 1996 (aged 29)	ML Vitebsk	2025	2026	19	3
48	Shota Diakonidze	(Georgia (country))	MF	18 May 2008 (aged 17)	Academy	2025		1	0
Forwards
12	Mate Vatsadze	(Georgia (country))	FW	17 December 1988 (aged 36)	Gagra	2024	2025		
19	Irakli Siradze	(Georgia (country))	FW	13 March 2001 (aged 24)	Atlantis	2025		19	5
24	Barnes Osei	(Ghana)	FW	8 January 1995 (aged 30)	Bnei Sakhnin	2025		95	12
27	Halid Doltmurziev	(Georgia (country))	FW	22 May 2007 (aged 18)	Club NXT	2025		2	0
29	Vasilios Gordeziani	(Georgia (country))	FW	29 January 2002 (aged 23)	PAOK	2024	2026	35	6
30	Temur Odikadze	(Georgia (country))	FW	28 March 2006 (aged 19)	Academy	2025		13	2
31	Rati Aleksidze	(Georgia (country))	FW	7 March 2007 (aged 18)	Academy	2025		2	0
32	Sandro Mikautadze	(Georgia (country))	FW	6 March 2009 (aged 16)	Academy	2024		1	0
33	Adrian César	(Brazil)	FW	19 September 2005 (aged 20)	Fluminense	2025	2025 (+1)	7	0
53	Nana-Kofi Donkor	(Ghana)	FW	5 January 2007 (aged 18)	on loan from Dila Gori	2025	2026	2	1
Dinamo Tbilisi II Players
	Giorgi Chkhetiani	(Georgia (country))	DF	20 February 2003 (aged 22)	Academy	2024		0	0
	Giorgi Meparishvili	(Georgia (country))	DF	11 June 2006 (aged 19)	Academy	2024		0	0
	Giorgi Tsetskhladze	(Georgia (country))	MF	4 March 2005 (aged 20)	Academy	2024		8	0
	Yusuf Mekhtiev	(Georgia (country))	FW	1 May 2006 (aged 19)	Academy	2024		1	0
Players away on loan
19	Otar Aptsiauri	(Georgia (country))	MF	23 October 2001 (aged 24)	Saburtalo Tbilisi	2022		14	1
27	Nikoloz Ugrekhelidze	(Georgia (country))	MF	15 August 2003 (aged 22)	Academy	2023		50	6
28	Luka Salukvadze	(Georgia (country))	DF	28 January 2003 (aged 22)	Academy	2024		1	0
36	Papuna Beruashvili	(Georgia (country))	GK	21 March 2004 (aged 21)	Academy	2022		0	0
	Mate Sauri	(Georgia (country))	GK	6 June 2006 (aged 19)	Academy	2024		0	0
	Nika Sikharulashvili	(Georgia (country))	MF	7 October 2003 (aged 22)	Academy	2023		13	1
	Oscar Santis	(Guatemala)	MF	25 March 1999 (aged 26)	Antigua	2024	2025 (+1)	34	3
	David Gotsiridze	(Georgia (country))	FW	6 April 2004 (aged 21)	Academy	2024		14	1
	Jaduli Iobashvili	(Georgia (country))	FW	1 January 2004 (aged 21)	Academy	2023		28	2
	Nikoloz Tshekladze	(Georgia (country))	FW	29 October 2005 (aged 20)	Academy	2024		20	2
Left during the season
6	Nodar Lominadze	(Georgia (country))	MF	4 April 2002 (aged 23)	Academy	2021		45	2
7	Vakhtang Salia	(Georgia (country))	FW	30 August 2007 (aged 18)	Academy	2023		57	8
9	Nikoloz Kutateladze	(Georgia (country))	FW	19 March 2001 (aged 24)	on loan from Pari NN	2025	2025	7	0
11	Saba Samushia	(Georgia (country))	MF	7 November 2006 (aged 19)	Academy	2024		13	0
14	Alisher Shukurov	(Tajikistan)	MF	30 March 2002 (aged 23)	Kuktosh Rudaki	2024	2025 (+1)	3	0
20	Nikoloz Chikovani	(Georgia (country))	MF	21 June 2007 (aged 18)	Academy	2025		9	1
24	Dominik Reiter	(Austria)	FW	4 January 1998 (aged 26)	SC Rheindorf Altach	2024	2025	21	2
26	Benson Anang	(Ghana)	DF	1 May 2000 (aged 25)	Othellos Athienou	2024		21	0
29	John Arthur	(Ghana)	FW	8 April 2002 (aged 23)	Felgueiras	2025	2026	3	0
38	Daniel Owusu	(Ghana)	MF	25 January 2003 (aged 22)	Samtredia	2025	2026	0	0
40	Saba Khvadagiani	(Georgia (country))	DF	30 January 2001 (aged 24)	on loan from Maccabi Netanya	2024	2025	134	6
	Mukhran Bagrationi	(Georgia (country))	DF	13 February 2004 (aged 21)	Telavi	2024		14	0
	Aleksandre Kalandadze	(Georgia (country))	DF	9 May 2001 (aged 24)	Academy	2020	2026	107	4
	Levan Osikmashvili	(Georgia (country))	MF	20 April 2002 (aged 23)	Academy	2022		84	0

== Transfers ==
=== In ===
Date	Position	Nationality	Name	From	Fee	Ref.
1 January 2025	MF	(Georgia (country))	Jaba Kankava	Unattached	Free	
4 January 2025	FW	(Georgia (country))	Tornike Morchiladze	Telavi	Undisclosed	
16 January 2025	GK	(Moldova)	Ștefan Sicaci	Kaisar	Undisclosed	
18 January 2025	FW	(Ghana)	Daniel Owusu	Samtredia	Undisclosed	
20 January 2025	FW	(Ghana)	John Arthur	Felgueiras	Undisclosed	
29 January 2025	MF	(Georgia (country))	Valerian Gvilia	Unattached	Free	
4 March 2025	DF	(Ukraine)	Bohdan Potalov	Unattached	Free	
4 March 2025	FW	(Brazil)	Adrian César	Fluminense	Undisclosed	
29 June 2025	GK	(Georgia (country))	Giorgi Loria	Omonia Aradippou	Undisclosed	
29 June 2025	MF	(Georgia (country))	Giorgi Lomtadze	Unattached	Free	
1 July 2025	FW	(Ghana)	Barnes Osei	Bnei Sakhnin	Free	
18 July 2025	MF	(Senegal)	Honore Gomis	ML Vitebsk	Undisclosed	
18 July 2025	FW	(Georgia (country))	Irakli Siradze	Atlantis	Undisclosed	
20 July 2025	FW	(Georgia (country))	Halid Doltmurziev	Club NXT	Undisclosed	
1 August 2025	MF	(Georgia (country))	Giorgi Kharaishvili	Unattached	Free	

=== Loans in ===
Date from	Position	Nationality	Name	From	Date to	Ref.
3 July 2024	DF	(Georgia (country))	Saba Khvadagiani	Maccabi Netanya	30 June 2025	
18 January 2025	DF	(Brazil)	Léo Assunpção	PSTC	31 December 2025	
15 February 2025	FW	(Georgia (country))	Nikoloz Kutateladze	Pari NN	30 June 2025	
15 July 2025	MF	(Ghana)	Nana-Kofi Donkor	Dila Gori	26 June 2026	
16 July 2025	MF	(Georgia (country))	Aleksandre Peikrishvili	Dynamo Kyiv		
26 July 2025	DF	(Georgia (country))	Luka Latsabidze	Shakhtar Donetsk	31 December 2025	
26 July 2025	MF	(Ivory Coast)	Abdoulaye Yoro	İstanbul Başakşehir	30 June 2026	

=== Out ===
Date	Position	Nationality	Name	To	Fee	Ref.
2 July 2025	DF	(Georgia (country))	Aleksandre Kalandadze	Wisła Płock	Undisclosed	
14 July 2025	MF	(Georgia (country))	Nodar Lominadze	Estoril	Undisclosed	
15 August 2025	DF	(Ghana)	Benson Anang	Akritas Chlorakas	Undisclosed	
20 August 2025	MF	(Georgia (country))	Levan Osikmashvili	Gagra	Undisclosed	
22 August 2025	DF	(Georgia (country))	Mukhran Bagrationi	Grazer AK	Undisclosed	
30 August 2025	FW	(Georgia (country))	Vakhtang Salia	Newcastle United	Undisclosed	
1 September 2025	FW	(Georgia (country))	Nikoloz Chikovani	Watford	Undisclosed	

=== Loans out ===
Date from	Position	Nationality	Name	To	Date to	Ref.
8 August 2024	MF	(Georgia (country))	Nika Sikharulashvili	Makedonikos	30 June 2025	
13 August 2024	GK	(Georgia (country))	Mate Sauri	Rio Ave	30 June 2025	
26 December 2024	FW	(Guatemala)	Oscar Santis	Antigua		
19 January 2025	MF	(Georgia (country))	Levan Osikmashvili	Hapoel Hadera	30 June 2025	
28 January 2025	DF	(Georgia (country))	Aleksandre Kalandadze	Fehérvár	30 June 2025	
3 February 2025	FW	(Georgia (country))	Vasilios Gordeziani	Sarajevo	30 June 2025	
11 July 2025	MF	(Georgia (country))	Nikoloz Ugrekhelidze	Fatih Karagümrük	30 June 2026	
22 July 2025	MF	(Georgia (country))	Otar Aptsiauri	Kapaz	30 June 2026	
24 July 2025	GK	(Georgia (country))	Papuna Beruashvili	Rustavi	31 December 2025	
31 July 2025	DF	(Georgia (country))	Luka Salukvadze	Gagra	31 December 2025	

=== Released ===
Date	Position	Nationality	Name	Joined	Date	Ref.
15 January 2025	GK	(Austria)	Tobias Schützenauer	LASK	6 February 2025	
15 January 2025	MF	(Georgia (country))	Saba Samushia	Rio Ave	3 February 2025	
15 January 2025	MF	(Nigeria)	Nosa Edokpolor	Kauno Žalgiris	4 February 2025	
15 January 2025	FW	(Georgia (country))	Tornike Kirkitadze	Dinamo Batumi		
15 January 2025	FW	(Georgia (country))	Davit Skhirtladze	Iberia 1999		
15 February 2025	FW	(Tajikistan)	Alisher Shukurov	Tyumen	14 March 2025	
30 June 2025	MF	(Ghana)	Daniel Owusu	SC Retz		
30 June 2025	FW	(Ghana)	John Arthur			
4 August 2025	FW	(Austria)	Dominik Reiter	Blau-Weiß Linz	5 September 2025	
31 December 2025	DF	(Georgia (country))	Saba Akhalkatsi	Samtredia	1 January 2026	
31 December 2025	MF	(Guatemala)	Oscar Santis	Antigua	1 January 2026	

=== Trial ===
Date from	Position	Nationality	Name	Last club	Date end	Ref.
January 2025	MF	(Ukraine)	Kyrylo Pashko	Dynamo Kyiv	February 2025	
January 2025	MF	(Ukraine)	Vladyslav Kalyn	Dynamo Kyiv	February 2025	
January 2025	FW	(Brazil)	Adrian Cesar Rodriguez	Fluminense	4 March 2025	
February 2025	DF	(Ukraine)	Bohdan Potalov	SpVgg Bayreuth	4 March 2025	
March 2025	FW	(Brazil)	Caua dos Santos			
June 2025	MF	(Jamaica)	Rolando Aarons	Celje	June 2025	

== Friendlies ==
26 January 2025	Dinamo Tbilisi	0–2	Dallas	Albufeira, Portugal
18:30 GET (UTC+4)		Report	Musa 38'; Endeley 65'	Stadium: Pine Cliffs Resort

31 January 2025	Sporting CP B	1–0	Dinamo Tbilisi	Portugal
16:00 GET (UTC+4)	Gonçalves 20'	Report

1 February 2025	Dinamo Tbilisi	2–0	Kriens	Portugal
GET (UTC+4)	Morchiladze 70', 74'	Report

8 February 2025	Sporting da Covilhã	2–0	Dinamo Tbilisi	Portugal
19:30 GET (UTC+4)	13'; 32'	Report

12 February 2025	Portimonense	1–2	Dinamo Tbilisi	Portugal
GET (UTC+4)	Eveli 23'	Report	Ugrekhelidze 60'; Vatsadze 84'

22 March 2025	Dinamo Tbilisi	3–0	Samtredia	Tbilisi
GET (UTC+4)	Assunpção; Caua; Arthur	Report		Stadium: Dighomi Training Ground

24 June 2025	Dinamo Tbilisi	1–1	Pyunik	Tbilisi
GET (UTC+4)	Ninua (pen.)	Report	Goal	Stadium: Boris Paichadze Dinamo Arena
Note: Match played behind closed doors.

29 June 2025	Dinamo Tbilisi	2–3	Urartu	Tbilisi
GET (UTC+4)	Siradze; Assunpção	Report	Goal	Stadium: Boris Paichadze Dinamo Arena
Note: Match played behind closed doors.

4 July 2025	Dinamo Tbilisi	0–0	Ararat-Armenia	Tbilisi
GET (UTC+4)		Report		Stadium: Boris Paichadze Dinamo Arena
Note: Match played behind closed doors.

8 July 2025	Çaykur Rizespor	1–3	Dinamo Tbilisi	Rize, Turkey
GET (UTC+4)	Olawoyin 65' (pen.)	Report	Gordeziani; Iakobidze; Lomtadze	Stadium: Rize City Stadium

12 July 2025	Trabzonspor	1–1	Dinamo Tbilisi	Trabzon, Turkey
GET (UTC+4)				Stadium: Şenol Güneş Sports Complex

26 July 2025	Dinamo Tbilisi	2–0	Gagra
GET (UTC+4)	Ninua (pen.); Lomtadze	Report

== Competitions ==
=== Overview ===
Competition	First match	Last match	Starting round	Final position	Record							
Competition	First match	Last match	Starting round	Final position	Pld	W	D	L	GF	GA	GD	Win %
Erovnuli Liga	6 March 2025	6 December 2025	Matchday 1	44th	36	15	12	9	51	33	+18	41.67
Georgian Cup	19 July 2025	19 July 2025	Round of 16	Round of 16	1	0	0	1	0	1	−1	0.00
Total					37	15	12	10	51	34	+17	40.54

Last updated: 6 December 2025
Source: Competitions

=== Erovnuli Liga ===
==== Results summary ====
Overall								Home						Away					
Pld	W	D	L	GF	GA	GD	Pts	W	D	L	GF	GA	GD	W	D	L	GF	GA	GD
36	15	12	9	51	33	+18	57	10	5	3	30	17	+13	5	7	6	21	16	+5

Last updated: 6 December 2025.
Source: See Results

==== Results by round ====
Round	2	3	4	5	1	6	7	8	9	10	11	12	13	14	15	16	17	18	19	20	21	22	23	24	25	26	27	28	29	30	31	32	33	34	35	36
Ground	H	A	A	H	A	A	H	A	H	H	A	H	H	A	A	A	H	A	A	H	A	A	H	H	H	A	H	H	A	H	H	A	H	A	H	A
Result	W	D	D	W	L	W	L	L	W	D	D	W	W	W	D	L	W	L	W	D	W	D	D	L	W	D	W	D	L	W	W	W	L	L	D	D
Position	2	4	5	3	4	3	4	4	4	4	4	4	4	3	3	4	3	4	3	3	3	3	3	3	3	3	3	3	4	3	3	3	4	4	4	4

Source: See Results
A = Away; H = Home; W = Win; D = Draw; L = Loss

==== Results ====
6 March 2025 2	Dinamo Tbilisi	2–1	Samgurali Tskaltubo	Tbilisi
19:00 GET (UTC+4)	Iakobidze 10'; Salia (yellow card) 45'; Chikovani (yellow card) 61'; Ninua 90+5'	Report	Mujiri (penalty missed) 15'; Khorkheli (yellow card) 57' (goal) 60' (pen.)	Stadium: Dinamo Arena; Referee: Irakli Shengelia

10 March 2025 3	Kolkheti-1913 Poti	0–0	Dinamo Tbilisi	Poti
15:00 GET (UTC+4)	Giunashvili (yellow card) 53'; Kharebava (yellow card) 77'	Report	Aptsiauri (yellow card) 37'; Sadghobelashvili (yellow card) 45'; Iakobidze (yellow card) 49'	Stadium: Fazisi Stadium; Referee: Giorgi Kruashvili

15 March 2025 4	Telavi	1–1	Dinamo Tbilisi	Telavi
18:00 GET (UTC+4)	Tsnobiladze 6'; Devdariani (yellow card) 23'; Kpozo (yellow card) 36'; Gabitashvili (yellow card) 65'	Report	Morchiladze (red card) 13'; Vatsadze 24'; Gvasalia (yellow card) 56'; Khvadagiani (yellow card) 75'; Potalov (yellow card) 85'; Kankava (yellow card) 87'	Stadium: Caucasus Arena; Referee: Kote Giorgadze

28 March 2025 5	Dinamo Tbilisi	1–0	Gareji Sagarejo	Tbilisi
15:00 GET (UTC+4)	Aptsiauri 15'; Kharebashvili (yellow card) 54'; Assunpção (yellow card) 56'; Ninua (yellow card) 65'; Kankava (yellow card) 71'; Salia (yellow card) 90+3'	Report	Tsetskhladze (yellow card) 82'	Stadium: Dinamo Arena; Referee: Guram Machitidze

1 April 2025 1	Dinamo Batumi	1–0	Dinamo Tbilisi	Batumi
19:00 GET (UTC+4)	Kapianidze (yellow card) 18'; Blesa 24'; Tsulukidze (yellow card) 47'; Fofana (yellow card) 80' (yellow-red card) 83'; Kharatishvili (yellow card) 90+5'	Report	Iakobidze (yellow card) 54'; Kharebashvili (yellow card) 81'	Stadium: Adjarabet Arena; Referee: Irakli Kvirikashvili
Note: Match original scheduled for 2 March, but postponed on 28 February due to bad weather.

5 April 2025 6	Gagra	0–4	Dinamo Tbilisi	Tbilisi
15:00 GET (UTC+4)	Gogoladze (yellow card) 47'; Katsiashvili (yellow card) 78' (yellow-red card) 80'	Report	Ninua 19' (yellow card) 70'; Assunpção 25'; Lominadze (yellow card) 69'; Salia 86'; Odikadze 89'	Stadium: David Petriashvili Arena; Referee: Koba Revazashvili

9 April 2025 7	Dinamo Tbilisi	1–2	Iberia 1999	Tbilisi
20:00 GET (UTC+4)	Ninua (yellow card) 19'; Kankava (yellow card) 55'; Odikadze 86'	Report	Tabatadze 33', 42'; Silagadze (yellow card) 55'; Akhvlediani (yellow card) 78'	Stadium: Dinamo Arena; Referee: Giorgi Kruashvili

13 April 2025 8	Torpedo Kutaisi	2–0	Dinamo Tbilisi	Kutaisi
21:00 GET (UTC+4)	Kvirkvelia 22'; Kokhreidze 26' (yellow card) 45+3'; Gudushauri (yellow card) 32'; Johnsen (penalty missed) 45+11 (yellow card) 78'; Warley (yellow card) 77'	Report	Khvadagiani (yellow card) 45+2'; Assunpção (yellow card) 80'; Aptsiauri (yellow card) 89'	Stadium: Ramaz Shengelia Stadium; Referee: Aleko Aptsiauri

17 April 2025 9	Dinamo Tbilisi	2–1	Dila Gori	Tbilisi
20:00 GET (UTC+4)	Lominadze (yellow card) 35'; Berelidze (yellow card) 39'; Morchiladze 53'; Assunpção 56'	Report	Konté (yellow card) 33'; Araújo (yellow card) 40'; Mendes (yellow card) 90+1'; Anoff 90+4'	Stadium: Dinamo Arena; Referee: Irakli Kherkhadze

25 April 2025 10	Dinamo Tbilisi	1–1	Dinamo Batumi	Tbilisi
20:00 GET (UTC+4)	Kankava (yellow card) 64'; Morchiladze 88' (pen.) (yellow card) 90+2'	Report	Blesa (yellow card) 64' (goal) 71' (pen.); Baladze (yellow card) 87'	Stadium: Dinamo Arena; Referee: Giorgi Avazashvili

29 April 2025 11	Samgurali Tskaltubo	0–0	Dinamo Tbilisi	Tsqaltubo
19:00 GET (UTC+4)	Ayni (yellow card) 46'	Report	Iakobidze (yellow card) 51'; Kharebashvili (yellow card) 90'	Stadium: Football Centre; Referee: Akaki Farjikia

3 May 2025 12	Dinamo Tbilisi	3–0	Kolkheti-1913 Poti	Tbilisi
16:00 GET (UTC+4)	Vatsadze 12' (yellow card) 81'; Morchiladze 15'; Lominadze 89'	Report	Meite (red card) 85'	Stadium: Dinamo Arena; Referee: Bakar Bregadze

8 May 2025 13	Dinamo Tbilisi	2–1	Telavi	Tbilisi
19:00 GET (UTC+4)	Gvilia 27'; Morchiladze 41'; Iakobidze (yellow card) 50'; Salia (yellow card) 61'; Gvasalia (yellow card) 90'	Report	Khvadagiani 45+3' (o.g.); Devdariani (yellow card) 46'; Parkinashvili (yellow card) 59'; Ubilava (yellow card) 90+6'	Stadium: Dinamo Arena; Referee: Koba Revazashvili

12 May 2025 14	Gareji Sagarejo	1–2	Dinamo Tbilisi	Tbilisi
21:00 GET (UTC+4)	Tsetskhladze 61'; Gabadze (yellow card) 62' (yellow-red card) 85'	Report	Ninua 45+1'; Gvilia 50'; Sicaci (yellow card) 62'; Kankava (yellow card) 63'; Kharebashvili (yellow card) 67'; Vatsadze (yellow card) 80'	Stadium: Mikheil Meskhi-2 Stadium; Referee: Aleko Aptsiauri

16 May 2025 15	Gagra	1–1	Dinamo Tbilisi	Tbilisi
21:00 GET (UTC+4)	Kharebashvili 14'; Gotsiridze (red card) 77'; Kacharava (yellow card) 81'	Report	Vatsadze 18'; Bagrationi (yellow card) 21'; Kankava (red card) 43'	Stadium: David Petriashvili Arena; Referee: Akaki Farjikia

20 May 2025 16	Iberia 1999	1–0	Dinamo Tbilisi	Tbilisi
20:00 GET (UTC+4)	Dzagania (yellow card) 69' (goal) 70'; G.Tabatadze (yellow card) 90+3'; Akhvlediani (yellow card) 90+5'	Report	Morchiladze (yellow card) 37'; Aptsiauri (yellow card) 45+2'	Stadium: Mikheil Meskhi Stadium; Referee: Irakli Kvirikashvili

24 May 2025 17	Dinamo Tbilisi	2–0	Torpedo Kutaisi	Tbilisi
21:00 GET (UTC+4)	Morchiladze 8' (red card) 90+5'; Berelidze (yellow card) 45+4' (red card) 90+5'; Assunpção 52'; Aptsiauri (yellow card) 70'; Salia (yellow card) 90+3'; Kharebashvili (yellow card) 90+3'; Khvadagiani (red card) 90+5'; Odikadze (red card) 90+5'; Makatsaria (red card) 90+5'	Report	Warley (yellow card) 36'; Basiladze (yellow card) 50'; Pires (yellow card) 90+3' (red card) 90+5'; Pimentel (red card) 90+5'; Jhow (red card) 90+5'; Zita (red card) 90+5'	Stadium: Dinamo Arena; Referee: Giorgi Kruashvili

28 May 2025 18	Dila Gori	2–1	Dinamo Tbilisi	Gori
20:00 GET (UTC+4)	Shekiladze 45+1', 52'; Rukhadze (yellow card) 62'	Report	Assunpção 19'; Lominadze (yellow card) 26'; Nachkebia (yellow card) 68'; Tsulaia (yellow card) 68'; Kankava (red card) 85'	Stadium: Tengiz Burjanadze Stadium; Referee: Jenner Khorava

4 August 2025 19	Dinamo Batumi	1–4	Dinamo Tbilisi	Batumi
21:00 GET (UTC+4)	Khozrevanidze 47'; Komakhidze (yellow card) 58'	Report	Gomis 21', 38'; Siradze 45+5'; Loria (yellow card) 50'; Kharebashvili (yellow card) 79'; Chikovani 87'	Stadium: Adjarabet Arena; Referee: Aleko Aptsiauri

10 August 2025 20	Dinamo Tbilisi	1–1	Samgurali Tskaltubo	Tbilisi
20:00 GET (UTC+4)	Osei (yellow card) 37'; Kankava (yellow card) 44'; Morchiladze 72'	Report	Khorkheli (yellow card) 12'; Wellissol 63'	Stadium: Dinamo Arena; Referee: Bakar Bregadze

16 August 2025 21	Kolkheti-1913 Poti	1–3	Dinamo Tbilisi	Poti
18:00 GET (UTC+4)	Kutateladze (yellow card) 37'; Leshchynskyi 40' (yellow card) 55'; Pachulia (yellow card) 45+1'; Méité (yellow card) 78'; Grigalava (yellow card) 87'	Report	Morchiladze 30', 51'; Siradze 90'	Stadium: Fazisi Stadium; Referee: Koba Revazashvili

23 August 2025 22	Telavi	0–0	Dinamo Tbilisi	Telavi
20:00 GET (UTC+4)	Chkhetiani (yellow card) 65'	Report	Ninua (yellow card) 16'; Kankava (yellow card) 20' (yellow-red card) 20'; Assunpção (yellow card) 34'; Kharaishvili (yellow card) 49'; Morchiladze (yellow card) 66'; Osei (red card) 79'; Berelidze (yellow card) 84'	Stadium: Caucasus Arena; Referee: Irakli Shengelia

29 August 2025 23	Dinamo Tbilisi	0–0	Gareji Sagarejo	Tbilisi
20:00 GET (UTC+4)	Yoro (yellow card) 34'; Berelidze (yellow card) 38'	Report	Papava (yellow card) 60'	Stadium: Dinamo Arena; Referee: Guram Machitidze

13 September 2025 24	Dinamo Tbilisi	0–1	Gagra	Tbilisi
19:00 GET (UTC+4)	Assunpção (red card) 45'; Siradze (yellow card) 77'; Potalov (yellow card) 90+4'	Report	Nadareishvili (yellow card) 48'; Augusto (yellow card) 76'; Wanderson 90+4' (pen.)	Stadium: Dinamo Arena; Referee: Goga Kikacheishvili

19 September 2025 25	Dinamo Tbilisi	2–1	Iberia 1999	Tbilisi
20:00 GET (UTC+4)	Sadghobelashvili (yellow card) 20'; Kharaishvili 23'; Siradze 80'	Report	Goshteliani 6'; Zohouri (yellow card) 49'; Kobuladze (yellow card) 83'	Stadium: Dinamo Arena; Referee: Irakli Kherkhadze

27 September 2025 26	Torpedo Kutaisi	1–1	Dinamo Tbilisi	Kutaisi
20:00 GET (UTC+4)	Johnsen 48' (yellow card) 58'; Jorginho (yellow card) 68'; Šimić (yellow card) 88'	Report	Morchiladze 71' (pen.); Iakobidze (yellow card) 90+5'	Stadium: Ramaz Shengelia Stadium; Referee: Aleko Aptsiauri

3 October 2025 27	Dinamo Tbilisi	2–0	Dila Gori	Tbilisi
21:00 GET (UTC+4)	Osei (red card) 10'; Yoro 45+1'; Gomis (yellow card) 85'; Kankava (yellow card) 90+2'; Vatsadze 90+8'	Report	Kobakhidze (yellow card) 15'	Stadium: Dinamo Arena; Referee: Irakli Shengelia

18 October 2025 28	Dinamo Tbilisi	1–1	Dinamo Batumi	Tbilisi
17:00 GET (UTC+4)	Sadghobelashvili (yellow card) 26'; Iakobidze (yellow card) 42'; Siradze 59'	Report	Tsulukidze (yellow card) 13'; Fofana (yellow card) 37'; Kapianidze (yellow card) 45'; Mylchenko (yellow card) 55'; Kalandarishvili (yellow card) 74' (goal) 90+9' (pen.); Chiteishvili (yellow card) 82'; Ouahabi (yellow card) 90'	Stadium: Dinamo Arena; Referee: Koba Revazashvili

22 October 2025 29	Samgurali Tskaltubo	2–1	Dinamo Tbilisi	Tsqaltubo
19:00 GET (UTC+4)	Pantsulaia 15', 45+3'; Vianna (yellow card) 64'; Bull (yellow card) 90+4'	Report	Latsabidze (yellow card) 35'; Iakobidze (yellow card) 45+2'; Gomis 56'	Stadium: Football Centre; Referee: Irakli Kvirikashvili

27 October 2025 30	Dinamo Tbilisi	3–1	Kolkheti-1913 Poti	Tbilisi
20:00 GET (UTC+4)	Morchiladze 6' (pen.); Vatsadze 22'; Latsabidze (yellow card) 34'; Kharaishvili 42'; Ninua (yellow card) 45+1'	Report	Pachulia 53'	Stadium: Dinamo Arena; Referee: Bakar Bregadze

2 November 2025 31	Dinamo Tbilisi	3–0	Telavi	Tbilisi
18:00 GET (UTC+4)	Gvasalia 23' (yellow card) 54'; Gomis (yellow card) 28'; Morchiladze 30'; Ninua 51'	Report	Odishvili (yellow card) 32'; Jordania (yellow card) 43'; Gogotishvili (yellow card) 82'; Tsetskhladze (yellow card) 90+2'	Stadium: Dinamo Arena; Referee: Jenner Khorava

7 November 2025 32	Gareji Sagarejo	0–1	Dinamo Tbilisi	Tbilisi
19:00 GET (UTC+4)	Kacharava (yellow card) 38'; Tsetskhladze (yellow card) 58'	Report	Latsabidze 72'; Yoro (yellow card) 79'; Iakobidze (yellow card) 87'	Stadium: Mikheil Meskhi-2 Stadium; Referee: Irakli Shengelia

21 November 2025 33	Dinamo Tbilisi	2–4	Gagra	Tbilisi
19:00 GET (UTC+4)	Morchiladze 18' (pen.); Vatsadze (yellow card) 42'; Yoro 88'	Report	Zoidze 10'; Tsintsadze 20'; Mujiri 47'; Gotsiridze 76'	Stadium: Dinamo Arena; Referee: Akaki Farjikia

26 November 2025 34	Iberia 1999	1–0	Dinamo Tbilisi	Tbilisi
19:00 GET (UTC+4)	Kobuladze (yellow card) 64'; Dzagania 81'; Makaridze (yellow card) 90+1'	Report	Gomis (yellow card) 70'; Sadghobelashvili (yellow card) 73'; Iakobidze (yellow card) 77'; Vatsadze (yellow card) 77' (yellow-red card) 90+6'; Tsulaia (yellow card) 86'; Odikadze (yellow card) 90+10'	Stadium: Mikheil Meskhi Stadium; Referee: Goga Kikacheishvili

30 November 2025 35	Dinamo Tbilisi	2–2	Torpedo Kutaisi	Tbilisi
19:00 GET (UTC+4)	Osei 14' (yellow card) 16'; Morchiladze (yellow card) 45+2'; Gvasalia (yellow card) 45+3'; Iakobidze (yellow card) 79'; Donkor 90'	Report	Gudushauri (yellow card) 22'; Johnsen 45+8' (pen.); Ninua 64' (o.g.)	Stadium: Dinamo Arena; Referee: Guram Machitidze

6 December 2025 36	Dila Gori	2–2	Dinamo Tbilisi	Gori
17:00 GET (UTC+4)	Hleihel 75'; Araújo (yellow card) 81'; Konté 90+2'	Report	Vatsadze 5' (pen.); Adrian (yellow card) 8'; Tsulaia (yellow card) 18'; Siradze 85'	Stadium: Tengiz Burjanadze Stadium; Referee: Aleko Aptsiauri

==== League table ====
Pos	Team	Pld	W	D	L	GF	GA	GD	Pts	Qualification or relegation
2	Dila Gori	36	25	3	8	63	35	+28	78	Qualification for Conference League first qualifying round (Note: The 2025 Georgian Cup winner was Dila Gori, so the third Conference League berth will go to the fourth place team.)
3	Torpedo Kutaisi	36	18	9	9	63	41	+22	63	Qualification for Conference League first qualifying round
4	Dinamo Tbilisi	36	15	12	9	51	34	+17	57	Qualification for Conference League first qualifying round
5	Gagra	36	12	7	17	44	55	−11	43 (Note: head-to-head points: Gagra-7, Dinamo Batumi-4)	
6	Dinamo Batumi	36	11	10	15	40	59	−19	43	

Source: Erovnuli Liga, Soccerway
Rules for classification: 1) Points; 2) Head-to-head points; 3) Head-to-head goal difference; 4) Head-to-head goals scored; 5) Head-to-head away goals scored (only if two teams); 6) Goal difference; 7) Goals scored.

=== Georgian Cup ===
19 July 2025 Round of 16	Samtredia	1–0	Dinamo Tbilisi	Samtredia
16:30 GET (UTC+4)	Mandzhgaladze (penalty missed) 11' (yellow card) 45'; Elbakidze (yellow card) 14'; Barrios 37' (yellow card) 82'; Aknazarov (yellow card) 61'; Gauto (yellow card) 63'	Report	Gomis (yellow card) 74'; Salia (yellow card) 78'; Vatsadze (yellow card) 90+6'	Stadium: Erosi Manjgaladze Stadium; Referee: Irakli Kherkhadze

== Squad statistics ==
As of match played 6 December 2025

=== Appearances and goals ===
No.	Pos	Nat	Player	Total		Erovnuli Liga		Georgian Cup	
No.	Pos	Nat	Player	Apps	Goals	Apps	Goals	Apps	Goals
1	GK	(Moldova) MDA	Ștefan Sicaci	9	0	9	0	0	0
2	DF	(Georgia (country)) GEO	Giorgi Gvasalia	24	1	20+4	1	0	0
4	DF	(Georgia (country)) GEO	Irakli Iakobidze	28	1	22+6	1	0	0
5	DF	(Georgia (country)) GEO	Saba Kharebashvili	30	0	29	0	1	0
6	MF	(Georgia (country)) GEO	Aleksandre Peikrishvili	2	0	0+1	0	1	0
8	MF	(Georgia (country)) GEO	Tsotne Berelidze	19	0	10+9	0	0	0
9	FW	(Georgia (country)) GEO	Giorgi Lomtadze	15	0	8+6	0	1	0
10	MF	(Georgia (country)) GEO	Giorgi Kharaishvili	13	2	10+3	2	0	0
11	MF	(Georgia (country)) GEO	Tornike Morchiladze	30	12	27+3	12	0	0
12	FW	(Georgia (country)) GEO	Mate Vatsadze	30	6	20+9	6	0+1	0
13	MF	(Georgia (country)) GEO	Luka Tsulaia	9	0	3+5	0	1	0
14	DF	(Brazil) BRA	Léo Assunpção	23	4	16+6	4	1	0
15	DF	(Georgia (country)) GEO	Luka Latsabidze	14	1	14	1	0	0
16	DF	(Georgia (country)) GEO	Saba Akhalkatsi	1	0	0+1	0	0	0
17	DF	(Ukraine) UKR	Bohdan Potalov	18	0	10+8	0	0	0
18	MF	(Georgia (country)) GEO	Valerian Gvilia	13	2	6+7	2	0	0
19	FW	(Georgia (country)) GEO	Irakli Siradze	22	5	11+10	5	0+1	0
22	MF	(Georgia (country)) GEO	Nika Ninua	33	4	26+6	4	1	0
23	MF	(Georgia (country)) GEO	Jaba Kankava	26	0	26	0	0	0
24	MF	(Ghana) GHA	Barnes Osei	14	1	13	1	1	0
26	MF	(Ivory Coast) CIV	Abdoulaye Yoro	14	2	8+6	2	0	0
27	FW	(Georgia (country)) GEO	Halid Doltmurziev	2	0	0+2	0	0	0
29	FW	(Georgia (country)) GEO	Vasilios Gordeziani	9	0	3+5	0	1	0
30	MF	(Georgia (country)) GEO	Temur Odikadze	13	2	1+12	2	0	0
33	FW	(Brazil) BRA	Adrian César	7	0	1+5	0	0+1	0
37	GK	(Georgia (country)) GEO	Mikheil Makatsaria	9	0	9	0	0	0
39	DF	(Georgia (country)) GEO	Gela Sadghobelashvili	12	0	9+2	0	1	0
40	GK	(Georgia (country)) GEO	Giorgi Loria	19	0	18	0	1	0
41	DF	(Georgia (country)) GEO	Mate Shatirishvili	7	0	2+4	0	1	0
45	MF	(Georgia (country)) GEO	Levan Nachkebia	1	0	0+1	0	0	0
46	MF	(Georgia (country)) GEO	Saba Nioradze	1	0	0+1	0	0	0
47	MF	(Senegal) SEN	Honore Gomis	19	3	11+7	3	0+1	0
48	MF	(Georgia (country)) GEO	Shota Diakonidze	1	0	0+1	0	0	0
53	FW	(Ghana) GHA	Nana-Kofi Donkor	2	1	0+2	1	0	0
Players away from Dinamo Tbilisi on loan:
19	MF	(Georgia (country)) GEO	Otar Aptsiauri	15	1	10+5	1	0	0
27	DF	(Georgia (country)) GEO	Nikoloz Ugrekhelidze	1	0	1	0	0	0
Players who left Astana during the season:
6	MF	(Georgia (country)) GEO	Nodar Lominadze	18	1	12+6	1	0	0
7	FW	(Georgia (country)) GEO	Vakhtang Salia	18	1	10+7	1	0+1	0
9	FW	(Georgia (country)) GEO	Nikoloz Kutateladze	7	0	0+7	0	0	0
15	DF	(Georgia (country)) GEO	Mukhran Bagrationi	9	0	3+6	0	0	0
20	FW	(Georgia (country)) GEO	Nikoloz Chikovani	9	1	4+5	1	0	0
24	FW	(Austria) AUT	Dominik Reiter	3	0	0+3	0	0	0
29	FW	(Ghana) GHA	John Arthur	3	0	1+2	0	0	0
40	DF	(Georgia (country)) GEO	Saba Khvadagiani	16	0	16	0	0	0

=== Goal scorers ===
Place	Position	Nation	Number	Name	Erovnuli Liga	Georgian Cup	Total
1	MF	(Georgia (country))	11	Tornike Morchiladze	12	0	12
2	FW	(Georgia (country))	12	Mate Vatsadze	6	0	6
3	FW	(Georgia (country))	19	Irakli Siradze	5	0	5
4	DF	(Brazil)	14	Léo Assunpção	4	0	4
4	MF	(Georgia (country))	22	Nika Ninua	4	0	4
6	MF	(Senegal)	47	Honore Gomis	3	0	3
7	MF	(Georgia (country))	30	Temur Odikadze	2	0	2
7	MF	(Georgia (country))	18	Valerian Gvilia	2	0	2
7	MF	(Georgia (country))	10	Giorgi Kharaishvili	2	0	2
7	MF	(Ivory Coast)	26	Abdoulaye Yoro	2	0	2
11	DF	(Georgia (country))	4	Irakli Iakobidze	1	0	1
11	MF	(Georgia (country))	19	Otar Aptsiauri	1	0	1
11	FW	(Georgia (country))	7	Vakhtang Salia	1	0	1
11	MF	(Georgia (country))	6	Nodar Lominadze	1	0	1
11	FW	(Georgia (country))	20	Nikoloz Chikovani	1	0	1
11	DF	(Georgia (country))	2	Giorgi Gvasalia	1	0	1
11	DF	(Georgia (country))	15	Luka Latsabidze	1	0	1
11	MF	(Ghana)	24	Barnes Osei	1	0	1
11	FW	(Ghana)	53	Nana-Kofi Donkor	1	0	1
				TOTALS	51	0	51

=== Clean sheets ===
Place	Position	Nation	Number	Name	Erovnuli Liga	Georgian Cup	Total
1	GK	(Georgia (country))	40	Giorgi Loria	5	0	5
2	GK	(Georgia (country))	37	Mikheil Makatsaria	3	0	3
2	GK	(Moldova)	1	Ștefan Sicaci	3	0	3
				TOTALS	11	0	11

=== Disciplinary record ===
Number	Nation	Position	Name	Erovnuli Liga		Georgian Cup		Total	
Number	Nation	Position	Name	Yellow card	Red card	Yellow card	Red card	Yellow card	Red card
1	(Moldova)	GK	Ștefan Sicaci	1	0	0	0	1	0
2	(Georgia (country))	DF	Giorgi Gvasalia	4	0	0	0	4	0
4	(Georgia (country))	DF	Irakli Iakobidze	10	0	0	0	10	0
5	(Georgia (country))	DF	Saba Kharebashvili	6	0	0	0	6	0
8	(Georgia (country))	MF	Tsotne Berelidze	4	1	0	0	4	1
10	(Georgia (country))	MF	Giorgi Kharaishvili	1	0	0	0	1	0
11	(Georgia (country))	MF	Tornike Morchiladze	4	2	0	0	4	2
12	(Georgia (country))	FW	Mate Vatsadze	5	1	1	0	6	1
13	(Georgia (country))	MF	Luka Tsulaia	3	0	0	0	3	0
14	(Brazil)	DF	Léo Assunpção	3	1	0	0	3	1
15	(Georgia (country))	DF	Luka Latsabidze	2	0	0	0	2	0
17	(Ukraine)	DF	Bohdan Potalov	2	0	0	0	2	0
19	(Georgia (country))	FW	Irakli Siradze	1	0	0	0	1	0
22	(Georgia (country))	MF	Nika Ninua	5	0	0	0	5	0
23	(Georgia (country))	MF	Jaba Kankava	9	3	0	0	9	3
24	(Ghana)	MF	Barnes Osei	2	2	0	0	2	2
26	(Ivory Coast)	MF	Abdoulaye Yoro	2	0	0	0	2	0
30	(Georgia (country))	MF	Temur Odikadze	1	1	0	0	1	1
33	(Brazil)	FW	Adrian César	1	0	0	0	1	0
37	(Georgia (country))	GK	Mikheil Makatsaria	0	1	0	0	0	1
39	(Georgia (country))	DF	Gela Sadghobelashvili	4	0	0	0	4	0
40	(Georgia (country))	GK	Giorgi Loria	1	0	0	0	1	0
45	(Georgia (country))	MF	Levan Nachkebia	1	0	0	0	1	0
47	(Senegal)	MF	Honore Gomis	3	0	1	0	4	0
Players away on loan:
19	(Georgia (country))	MF	Otar Aptsiauri	4	0	0	0	4	0
Players who left Dinamo Tbilisi during the season:
6	(Georgia (country))	MF	Nodar Lominadze	3	0	0	0	3	0
7	(Georgia (country))	FW	Vakhtang Salia	4	0	1	0	5	0
15	(Georgia (country))	DF	Mukhran Bagrationi	1	0	0	0	1	0
20	(Georgia (country))	FW	Nikoloz Chikovani	1	0	0	0	1	0
40	(Georgia (country))	DF	Saba Khvadagiani	2	1	0	0	2	1
			TOTALS	90	13	3	0	93	13
