= Morchiladze =

Morchiladze (Georgian: მორჩილაძე) is a Georgian surname. Notable people with the surname include:

- Aka Morchiladze (born 1966), Georgian writer
- Tornike Morchiladze (born 2002), Georgian footballer
