= Zhordania =

Zhordania (Georgian: ჟორდანია), also transliterated as Jordania, is a surname of Georgian origin. Notable people with the surname include:

- Joseph Jordania (born 1954), Georgian-Australian ethnomusicologist and professor
- Levan Jordania (born 1997), Georgian footballer
- Xvicha Jordania (born 1965), Georgian footballer, manager, and owner
- Noe Zhordania (1868—1953), Georgian journalist and politician
- Tedo Zhordania (1854–1916), Georgian historian, philologist, and educator
- Vakhtang Jordania (1943–2005), Georgian conductor
