= Jaba Kankava =

Georgian footballer

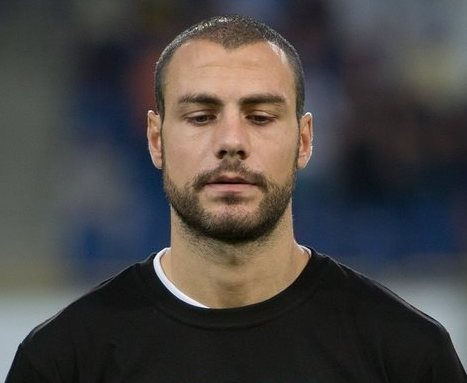
- Kankava in 2014

Personal information
- Date of birth: 18 March 1986 (age 40)
- Place of birth: Tbilisi, Georgian SSR, Soviet Union
- Height: 1.75 m (5 ft 9 in)
- Position: Defensive midfielder

Senior career*
Years	Team	Apps	(Gls)
2003–2004	Dinamo Tbilisi	14	(0)
2005	Alania Vladikavkaz	12	(0)
2005–2006	Arsenal Kyiv	24	(4)
2007–2015	Dnipro Dnipropetrovsk	91	(4)
2010–2012	→ Kryvbas Kryvyi Rih (loan)	37	(2)
2015–2017	Stade Reims	47	(0)
2018–2020	Tobol	76	(4)
2021	Valenciennes	14	(0)
2021–2024	Slovan Bratislava	71	(3)
2025–2026	Dinamo Tbilisi	37	(0)

International career^{‡}
2002–2003	Georgia U17	3	(0)
2003–2004	Georgia U19	5	(0)
2004–2006	Georgia U21	8	(0)
2004–2024	Georgia	101	(10)
- * Club domestic league appearances and goals as of 17 November 2026 ‡ National team caps and goals as of 14 April 2024

Jaba Kankava (Georgian: ჯაბა კანკავა, romanized: jaba k'ank'ava, pronounced [dʒaba kʼankʼava]; born 18 March 1986) is a Georgian professional footballer who plays as a defensive midfielder, most recently for Dinamo Tbilisi.

Kankava is the three-time winner of Slovakia's Slovak First Football League. With 101 appearances in official matches for the national team, he is the second most-capped Georgian player after Guram Kashia. He has been twice recognized as Georgian Footballer of the Year.

== Club career ==
Jaba Kankava was born on 18 March 1986 in Tbilisi to Nana and Gia Kankava, and has one older brother, Levan.

He played football from a young age, joining Vake 91 when he was six in 1992. Kankava played eight years there under the management of Guram Chomakhidze before moving to Dinamo Tbilisi at the age of 14.

In 2004, Kankava started his football career with Dinamo Tbilisi, where Gia Geguchadze was just appointed as head coach. Geguchadze started to create a new club with youngsters and Kankava became a main member of them. In his first year, Kankava won the Georgian Cup, and played in the UEFA Europa League scoring the winning goal against Slavia Prague and contributing to the qualification for the group stages.

After one season at Dinamo, Kankava moved to Alania Vladikavkaz, where he played 12 matches, before signing a contract with Arsenal Kyiv in 2005. At Arsenal Kyiv, he played 24 matches and scored 4 goals.

In 2007, Kankava agreed to sign a three-year contract with league rival Dnipro. Newly arrived Kankava was among the starting squad from the first games but received a red card against Dynamo Kyiv because of a tough tackle and missed several games and was among the bench players. He won the silver medals of the Ukrainian league in 2014. The next season Kankava played in a dramatic Europa League final against Sevilla, which was his last appearance for the club. In eight years at Dnipro, he played 91 matches and scored 4 goals.

In 2015, Kankava joined Ligue 1 club Reims in a deal worth €1.5 million. During his second season at this club Kankava was three times named the best player of month by popular vote and eventually recognized Player of the Season. In July 2017, he agreed to the termination of his contract which ran until 2018.

On 22 November 2018, Kankava signed a new two-year contract with FC Tobol.

On 16 January 2021, Valenciennes announced the signing of Kankava on a contract until June 2021. Аt the end of this season he joined Fortuna Liga side Slovan Bratislava. In May 2022, he was selected in Team of the Season. During the next three years Kankava made 116 appearances for Slovan in all competitions and won three league titles. He left the club in June 2024.

On 29 December 2024, Dinamo Tbilisi announced the signing of Kankava to a one-year contract. On 9 November 2026, Dinamo announced that they had terminated their contract with Kankava by mutual agreement.

== International career ==
On 8 September 2004, Kankava made his debut for Georgia against Albania in the 2006 FIFA World Cup qualification. Later on, he managed score a goal against Croatia in UEFA Euro 2012 qualifying, and against Germany in UEFA Euro 2016 qualifying. From August 2012 up to October 2021, he was the captain, leading the team in 62 matches.

On 27 January 2022, Kankava announced his retirement from international football after appearing in 100 matches, captaining Georgia 62 times, however he came out of retirement to feature in Georgia's qualifiers for Euro 2024.

Kavkava received a call-up to the team for the European championship on 22 May 2024. Two days later, he announced that he would refrain himself from taking part in the matches and travel to Germany as a fan only. His decision was widely hailed as unselfish and exemplary. Although not present at Euro 2024, Kankava was awarded the Order of Honour by a presidential decree issued on 2 July 2024.

== Career statistics ==
=== Club ===
As of match played 31 October 2026

Data available from 2008

Appearances and goals by club, season and competition
Club	Season	League			National cup		Continental		Other		Total	
Club	Season	Division	Apps	Goals	Apps	Goals	Apps	Goals	Apps	Goals	Apps	Goals
Dnipro	2008–09	Ukrainian Premier League	0	0	–		–		–		0	0
Dnipro	2009–10	Ukrainian Premier League	0	0	1	0	–		–		1	0
Dnipro	2012–13	Ukrainian Premier League	17	1	2	0	5	0	–		24	1
Dnipro	2013–14	Ukrainian Premier League	25	0	2	0	8	0	–		35	0
Dnipro	2014–15	Ukrainian Premier League	15	0	2	0	14	1	–		31	1
Dnipro	2015–16	Ukrainian Premier League	4	0	2	0	–		–		6	0
Dnipro	Total		61	1	1	0	27	1	0	0	89	2
Kryvbas (loan)	2010–11	Ukrainian Premier League	8	0	–		–		–		8	0
Kryvbas (loan)	2011–12	Ukrainian Premier League	23	0	1	0	–		–		24	0
Kryvbas (loan)	2012–13	Ukrainian Premier League	7	2	0	0	–		–		7	2
Kryvbas (loan)	Total		38	2	1	0	0	0	0	0	39	2
Stade Reims	2015–16	Ligue 1	27	0	1	0	–		–		28	0
Stade Reims	2016–17	Ligue 2	20	0	1	0	–		–		21	0
Stade Reims	Total		47	0	2	0	0	0	0	0	49	0
Tobol	2018	Kazakhstan Premier League	28	3	2	0	4	0	–		34	3
Tobol	2019	Kazakhstan Premier League	29	0	2	0	2	0	–		33	0
Tobol	2020	Kazakhstan Premier League	19	1	–		–		–		19	1
Tobol	Total		76	4	4	0	6	0	0	0	86	4
Valenciennes	2020–21	Ligue 2	14	0	2	0	–		–		16	0
Slovan	2021–22	Slovak First Football League	25	1	5	0	8	0	–		38	0
Slovan	2022–23	Slovak First Football League	26	1	3	2	10	0	–		39	3
Slovan	2023–24	Slovak First Football League	20	1	3	1	16	0	–		39	2
Slovan	Total		71	3	11	3	34	0	0	0	116	6
Dinamo Tbilisi	2025	Erovnuli Liga	26	0	0	0	–		–		26	0
Dinamo Tbilisi	2026	Erovnuli Liga	11	0	1	0	0	0	0	0	12	0
Dinamo Tbilisi	Total		37	0	1	0	0	0	0	0	38	0
Total			344	10	30	3	67	1	0	0	441	14

=== National team ===
As of 26 March 2024

Appearances and goals by national team and year
National team	Year	Apps	Goals
Georgia	2004	1	0
Georgia	2005	6	0
Georgia	2006	8	1
Georgia	2007	7	1
Georgia	2008	3	0
Georgia	2009	0	0
Georgia	2010	1	0
Georgia	2011	7	2
Georgia	2012	7	0
Georgia	2013	6	0
Georgia	2014	7	1
Georgia	2015	8	2
Georgia	2016	2	0
Georgia	2017	8	0
Georgia	2018	8	2
Georgia	2019	8	1
Georgia	2020	7	0
Georgia	2021	6	0
Georgia	2024	1	0
Total		101	10

Scores and results list Georgia's goal tally first, score column indicates score after each Kankava goal.

List of international goals scored by Jaba Kankava
No.	Date	Venue	Opponent	Score	Result	Competition
1	1 March 2006	Ta' Qali National Stadium, Attard, Malta	Malta	2–0	2–0	Friendly
2	16 November 2007	Al-Gharafa Stadium, Doha, Qatar	Qatar	1–0	2–1	Friendly
3	3 June 2011	Stadion Poljud, Split, Croatia	Croatia	1–0	1–2	UEFA Euro 2012 qualification
4	6 September 2011	Ta' Qali National Stadium, Attard, Malta	Malta	1–0	1–1	UEFA Euro 2012 qualification
5	14 October 2014	Estádio Algarve, Faro/Loulé, Portugal	Gibraltar	3–0	3–0	UEFA Euro 2016 qualification
6	25 March 2015	Mikheil Meskhi Stadium, Tbilisi, Georgia	Malta	1–0	2–0	Friendly
7	12 October 2015	Red Bull Arena, Leipzig, Germany	Germany	1–1	1–2	UEFA Euro 2016 qualification
8	13 October 2018	Boris Paichadze Dinamo Arena, Tbilisi, Georgia	Andorra	3–0	3–0	2018–19 UEFA Nations League D
9	16 October 2018	Daugava Stadium, Riga, Latvia	Latvia	1–0	3–0	2018–19 UEFA Nations League D
10	15 October 2019	Victoria Stadium, Gibraltar	Gibraltar	2–0	3–2	UEFA Euro 2020 qualification

== Honours ==
Dinamo Tbilisi

- Georgian Cup: 2003–04

Dnipro

- Premier League runner-up: 2013–14
- UEFA Europa League runner-up: 2014–15

Tobol

- Kazakhstan Premier League runner-up: 2020

Slovan Bratislava

- Fortuna Liga: 2021–22, 2022–23, 2023–24
- Slovak Cup runner-up: 2021–22

Individual

- Georgian Footballer of the Year: 2015, 2019
- Slovak First Football League Team of the Season: 2021–22

== Awards ==
On 30 March 2014, Kankava saved the life of Dynamo Kyiv captain, Oleh Husyev, after Husyev was briefly knocked unconscious in a collision and swallowed his tongue which blocked his airway. Kankava reacted immediately by sticking his fingers in Husyev's mouth to dislodge his tongue and clear his airway. On 12 April 2014, before Dnipro played Metalurh Zaporizhya at the Dnipro Arena, Kankava was awarded the Order of Merit for his actions in Dnipropetrovsk.

== See also ==
- List of men's footballers with 100 or more international caps
