= Tsotne Berelidze =

Georgian footballer

Personal information
- Date of birth: 24 March 2006 (age 20)
- Place of birth: Tbilisi, Georgia
- Height: 1.81 m (5 ft 11 in)
- Position: Midfielder

Team information
- Current team: Viagem Ústí nad Labem
- Number: 17

Youth career
- Dinamo Tbilisi

Senior career*
Years	Team	Apps	(Gls)
2023–2025	Dinamo-2 Tbilisi	13	(2)
2024–2026	Dinamo Tbilisi	41	(0)
2026	→ Samgurali Tskaltubo (loan)	11	(0)
2026–	Viagem Ústí nad Labem	2	(0)

International career^{‡}
2022	Georgia U17	3	(0)
2023	Georgia U18	3	(0)
2023–2025	Georgia U19	22	(2)
2025-	Georgia U21	2	(0)
- * Club domestic league appearances and goals as of 22:00, 30 November 2025 (UTC) ‡ National team caps and goals as of 22:00, 30 November 2025 (UTC)

Tsotne Berelidze (Georgian: ცოტნე ბერელიძე; born 24 March 2006) is a Georgian footballer who plays as a midfielder for Viagem Ústí nad Labem in the Czech National Football League.

== Career ==
=== Club ===
Berelidze made his professional debut for Dinamo Tbilisi on 12 April 2024, He played 90 minutes in a 0–0 Erovnuli Liga draw against Kolkheti Poti. Following that game, the 18-year-old regularly featured in the starting team of his club.

On 28 July 2026, Berelidze signed a multi-year contract with Czech National Football League club Viagem Ústí nad Labem.

=== National team ===
Berelidze made his debut for Georgia's under-17 national team coming on as a late substitute in a 6–2 defeat against England on October 28, 2022. On 15 November 2023, at the age of 17, Berelidze debuted for Georgia's under-19's, playing the full 90 minutes and scoring his first goal in a 2–0 victory over Cyprus in the 2024 UEFA European Under-19 Championship qualification. Three days later, in Georgia's second group match against Moldova, he won a penalty that contributed to their 2–1 victory. In their third group match, Georgia suffered a 4–0 defeat to Spain but still advanced to the Elite round.

== Career statistics ==
=== Club ===
As of match played 30 November 2025

Appearances and goals by club, season and competition
Club	Season	League			Domestic Cup		Continental		Other		Total	
Club	Season	Division	Apps	Goals	Apps	Goals	Apps	Goals	Apps	Goals	Apps	Goals
Dinamo Tbilisi	2024	Erovnuli Liga	22	0	3	0	0	0	2 (Note: Appearance(s) in Georgian Super Cup)	0	27	0
Dinamo Tbilisi	2025	Erovnuli Liga	19	0	0	0	0	0	0	0	19	0
Dinamo Tbilisi	Total		41	0	3	0	0	0	2	0	46	0
Career Total			41	0	3	0	0	0	2	0	46	0
