= Luka Latsabidze =

Georgian footballer

Personal information
- Date of birth: 18 March 2004 (age 22)
- Place of birth: Khashuri, Georgia
- Height: 1.93 m (6 ft 4 in)
- Position: Defender

Team information
- Current team: Torpedo Kutaisi (on loan from Shakhtar Donetsk)

Youth career
- 2011–2013: Iveria Khashuri
- 2013–2022: Dinamo Tbilisi

Senior career*
Years	Team	Apps	(Gls)
2022–2023	Dinamo Tbilisi-2	33	(1)
2023	Dinamo Tbilisi	2	(0)
2024–	Shakhtar Donetsk	0	(0)
2024–2025	→ Chornomorets Odesa (loan)	18	(0)
2025	→ Dinamo Tbilisi (loan)	14	(1)
2026	→ Vejle (loan)	0	(0)
2026–	→ Torpedo (loan)	0	(0)

International career
2022–2023	Georgia U19	4	(0)
2024–	Georgia U21	1	(0)
- * Club domestic league appearances and goals as of 10 December 2025

Luka Latsabidze (Georgian: ლუკა ლაცაბიძე; born 18 March 2004) is a Georgian professional footballer who plays as a central defender for Erovnuli Liga club Torpedo Kutaisi, on loan from Shakhtar Donetsk.

Latsabidze is the winner of Georgian top league with Dinamo Tbilisi.

== Career ==
=== Club ===
Latsabidze joined his hometown club Iveria at age 7. After two years he was signed by Dinamo Tbilisi where he spent the rest of his youth career. Having played for Dinamo's reserve team in the 2nd and 3rd divisions, Latsabidze made a debut with the senior team in a Georgian Cup match against Samtredia on 7 August 2022. He was a member of the squad that won the national league in 2022.

At the end of this season, Latsabidze received a first broad recognition. Nominated by GFF as U19 Player of the Year at its annual awards ceremony, he won the relevant Aleksandre Chivadze golden award.

On 4 February 2024, Ukrainian Premier League champions Shakhtar Donetsk announced that they had signed Latsabidze on a deal until 31 December 2028. He did not appear in official matches, though, before joining Chornomorets in the summer window on a year-long loan.

On 2 February 2026, Danish Superliga club Vejle Boldklub signed Latsabidze on loan until the end of June 2026.

=== International ===
Latsabidze made his debut with U19s in a 2023 UEFA Championship qualifier against Croatia on 29 March 2022. On 15 November 2024, he played a full match for the first time at U21 level against the same opponents in 2025 UEFA Championship play-offs.

== Statistics ==
As of match played 14 December 2024

Appearances and goals by club, season and competition
Club	Season	League			National Cup		Continental		Other		Total	
Club	Season	Division	Apps	Goals	Apps	Goals	Apps	Goals	Apps	Goals	Apps	Goals
Dinamo Tbilisi	2022	Erovnuli Liga	0	0	1	0	–		–		1	0
Dinamo Tbilisi	2023	Erovnuli Liga	2	0	–		–		–		2	0
Dinamo Tbilisi	Total		2	0	1	0	0	0	0	0	3	0
Dinamo Tbilisi-2	2022	Liga 3	11	1	1	0	–		–		12	1
Dinamo Tbilisi-2	2023	Erovnuli Liga 2	22	0	–		–		–		22	0
Dinamo Tbilisi-2	Total		33	1	1	0	0	0	0	0	34	1
Chornomorets (loan)	2024–25	Ukrainian Premier League	11	0	–		–		–		11	0
Career total			46	1	2	0	0	0	0	0	48	1

== Honours ==
=== Team ===
• Dinamo Tbilisi

Erovnuli Liga: 2022

=== Individual ===
• U19 Player of the Year in Georgia: 2022
