= Bohdan Potalov =

Ukrainian footballer

Personal information
- Full name: Bohdan Artemovych Potalov
- Date of birth: 12 August 2002 (age 24)
- Place of birth: Ukraine
- Height: 1.85 m (6 ft 1 in)
- Position: Left-back

Team information
- Current team: Dinamo Tbilisi
- Number: 17

Youth career
- 2014–2018: Shakhtar Donetsk
- 2018–2019: Mariupol

Senior career*
Years	Team	Apps	(Gls)
2019–2022	Mariupol	1	(0)
2022–2023	Burglengenfeld	23	(3)
2023–2024	Bayern Hof	19	(0)
2024–2025	Bayreuth	27	(1)
2025–	Dinamo Tbilisi	18	(0)
- * Club domestic league appearances and goals as of 10 December 2025

Bohdan Artemovych Potalov (Ukrainian: Богдан Артемович Поталов; born 12 August 2002) is a Ukrainian professional footballer who plays as a left-back for Dinamo Tbilisi.

== Career ==
On 4 March 2025, Dinamo Tbilisi announced the signing of Potalov to a two-year contract with the option of a third after a successful trial period.
