= Honore Gomis =

Senegalese footballer

Personal information
- Date of birth: 27 February 1996 (age 30)
- Place of birth: Thiaroye, Senegal
- Height: 1.72 m (5 ft 8 in)
- Position: Winger

Team information
- Current team: Minsk
- Number: 7

Senior career*
Years	Team	Apps	(Gls)
2015–2018	Guédiawaye		
2018	Sacré-Cœur		
2018–2019	Hatayspor	1	(1)
2019–2021	Ümraniyespor	51	(5)
2022	Menemen F.K.	1	(0)
2022–2023	Dila Gori	59	(12)
2024	Dinamo Batumi	29	(4)
2025	ML Vitebsk	6	(0)
2025	Dinamo Tbilisi	18	(3)
2026	Kyzylzhar	11	(0)
2026–	Minsk	2	(0)

International career^{‡}
2017	Senegal	3	(0)
- * Club domestic league appearances and goals as of 21 August 2026 ‡ National team caps and goals as of 12 August 2023

Honore Gomis (born 27 February 1996) is a Senegalese professional footballer who plays as a winger for Minsk.

== Biography ==
On 20 January 2025, Gomis became a football player for the Belarusian football club ML Vitebsk.

On 18 July 2025, he returned to the Erovnuli Liga, signing for Dinamo Tbilisi. On 11 January 2026, Dinamo announced that Gomis had left Dinamo after his contract had expired.

On 5 February 2026, Kazakhstan Premier League club Kyzylzhar announced the signing of Gomis.
