= Aleksandre Peikrishvili =

Georgian footballer (born 2006)

Personal information
- Date of birth: 14 June 2006 (age 20)
- Place of birth: Tbilisi, Georgia
- Height: 1.84 m (6 ft 0 in)
- Position: Defensive midfielder

Team information
- Current team: Gagra (on loan from Dynamo Kyiv)
- Number: 21

Youth career
- 2013–2015: Metalurgi Rustavi
- 2015–2023: Dinamo Tbilisi

Senior career*
Years	Team	Apps	(Gls)
2023	Dinamo Tbilisi II	30	(10)
2024	Dinamo Tbilisi	0	(0)
2024–	Dynamo Kyiv	5	(6)
2025	→ Dinamo Tbilisi (Loan)	1	(0)
2026–	→ Gagra (Loan)	3	(0)

International career^{‡}
2022	Georgia U16	1	(0)
2022–2023	Georgia U17	5	(0)
2023	Georgia U18	8	(1)
2023–	Georgia U19	6	(1)
- * Club domestic league appearances and goals as of 11 March 2026 ‡ National team caps and goals as of 28 April 2024

Aleksandre "Lexo" Peikrishvili (Georgian: ალექსანდრე ფეიქრიშვილი; born 14 June 2006) is a Georgian footballer who plays as a defensive midfielder for Erovnuli Liga club Gagra on loan from Dynamo Kyiv.

On 11 October 2023, Peikrishvili was named by English newspaper The Guardian as one of the best players born in 2006 worldwide.

== Club career ==
Peikrishvili was born in Tbilisi to Giorgi Peikrishvili, a former footballer. He started his youth career at the age of 7, playing for Metalurgi Rustavi. In 2015, he moved to the Dinamo Tbilisi youth academy.

He scored 5 goals after 21 appearances in his first senior season with Dinamo Tbilisi. He was thus named as the Georgia's second best U-19 player of the year in a ceremonial organized by Georgian Football Federation.

On 16 July 2024, Peikrishvili signed a 5-year contract with Ukrainian club Dynamo Kyiv.
