= Nikoloz Kutateladze =

Georgian footballer

Personal information
- Date of birth: 19 March 2001 (age 25)
- Place of birth: Tbilisi, Georgia
- Height: 1.84 m (6 ft 0 in)
- Position: Centre-forward

Team information
- Current team: FCI Levadia
- Number: 9

Youth career
- 2009–2011: Sparta Prague
- 2011–2016: Lille
- 2017–2018: Paris Saint-Germain
- 2018: Anzhi Makhachkala
- 2019–2022: Spartak Moscow

Senior career*
Years	Team	Apps	(Gls)
2019–2022	Spartak-2 Moscow	22	(0)
2022–2023	Rodez	0	(0)
2022–2023	Rodez II	7	(1)
2023–2026	Pari Nizhny Novgorod	21	(2)
2024	Pari NN-2 Nizhny Novgorod	3	(0)
2025	→ Dinamo Tbilisi (loan)	7	(0)
2025–2026	→ Kolkheti-1913 Poti (loan)	12	(1)
2026	Rustavi	14	(1)
2026–	FCI Levadia	13	(4)

International career
2017	Georgia U17	5	(0)
- * Club domestic league appearances and goals as of 17 November 2026

Nikoloz Kutateladze (Georgian: ნიკოლოზ ქუთათელაძე; born 19 March 2001) is a Georgian footballer who plays as a centre-forward for Meistriliiga club FCI Levadia.

== Club career ==
He made his debut in the Russian Football National League for Spartak-2 Moscow on 13 November 2019 in a game against Armavir.

On 28 July 2022, Kutateladze signed with Rodez in France for two seasons.

On 7 September 2023, Kutateladze joined Russian Premier League club Pari Nizhny Novgorod on a three-year contract. On his debut on 15 September 2023, he scored a late equalizer in a 1–1 away draw against Dynamo Moscow.

On 15 February 2025, Dinamo Tbilisi announced the signing of Kutateladze on loan from Pari NN until the end of the year.

On 4 February 2026, the contract with Pari NN was mutually terminated. On the next day, Kutateladze signed with Rustavi.

== Career statistics ==
As of match played 28 August 2024

Appearances and goals by club, season and competition
Club	Season	League			Cup		Continental		Other		Total	
Club	Season	League	Apps	Goals	Apps	Goals	Apps	Goals	Apps	Goals	Apps	Goals
Spartak-2 Moscow	2019–20	Russian First League	2	0	—		—		—		2	0
Spartak-2 Moscow	2020–21	Russian First League	2	0	—		—		—		2	0
Spartak-2 Moscow	2021–22	Russian First League	18	0	—		—		—		18	0
Spartak-2 Moscow	Total		22	0	—		—		—		22	0
Rodez II	2022–23	Championnat National 3	7	1	—		—		—		7	1
Rodez	2022–23	Ligue 2	0	0	0	0	—		—		0	0
Nizhny Novgorod	2023–24	Russian Premier League	18	2	3	0	—		2 (Note: Appearances in Relegation Play-offs)	0	23	2
Nizhny Novgorod	2024–25	Russian Premier League	3	0	2	0	—		—		5	0
Nizhny Novgorod	Total		21	2	5	0	—		2	0	28	2
Career total			50	3	5	0	0	0	2	0	57	3

== Honours ==
Individual

- Russian Premier League goal of the month: September 2023 (Dynamo Moscow – Pari Nizhny Novgorod 1–1, 15 September 2023).
