= Tornike Morchiladze =

Georgian footballer (born 2002)

Personal information
- Date of birth: 10 January 2002 (age 24)
- Place of birth: Georgia
- Height: 1.71 m (5 ft 7 in)
- Position: Midfielder

Team information
- Current team: CD Lugo

Youth career
- –2019: Dinamo Tbilisi

Senior career*
Years	Team	Apps	(Gls)
2020–2026	Dinamo Tbilisi	55	(13)
2023	Dinamo Tbilisi-2	14	(4)
2023–2024	→ Telavi (loan)	47	(8)
2026	Rijeka	10	(0)
2026–	CD Lugo	0	(0)

International career^{‡}
2018	Georgia U17	3	(1)
2023–	Georgia U21	8	(1)
- * Club domestic league appearances and goals as of 23 May 2026 ‡ National team caps and goals as of 3 May 2025

Tornike Morchiladze (Georgian: თორნიკე მორჩილაძე; born 10 January 2002) is a Georgian professional footballer who plays as an attacking midfielder for Spanish Primera Federacion club CD Lugo.

He has won the Erovnuli Liga and Supercup and represented his country in the national youth teams.

== Club career ==
Morchiladze is a product of Dinamo Tbilisi academy. He played for their all youth teams before making his debut for the senior team in a 2–0 loss to Samgurali on 25 April 2021. Morchiladze opened his goal-scoring account four days later with a winner against Torpedo. He made 22 more appearances for the team before joining Dinamo-2 the next year. Morchiladze helped the team earn promotion from Liga 3 and spent half of the 2023 season in the 2nd division. In June 2023, he moved to Telavi on a loan deal.

Morchiladze had a tangible impact on his new team. He finished the 2024 season as Telavi's shared top scorer and, besides, received a special individual award after his goal scored directly from a corner kick against Samtredia in a 2–1 away win was selected by the Georgian Football Federation as Erovnuli Liga Goal of the Year.

In January 2025, Morchiladze returned from loan and signed a year-long deal with Dinamo Tbilisi.

In 2026, Morchiladze moved to Croatian Football League club Rijeka where he made 13 appearances. On 31 August 2026, he signed for Spanish 3rd division side CD Lugo.

== International career ==
Morchiladze was first called up to the U16 team for friendlies against Luxemburg in February 2018. In the same year, he featured for U17s in the 2019 UEFA European Championship first qualifying round, scoring against Denmark.

In November 2021, Morchiladze was included in a U21 team list against England U21, although he did not play until a new qualifying campaign began in September 2023.

Morchiladze took part in five official games held by the youth squad that reached the final stage of the 2025 UEFA European Under-21 Championship. He netted against Serbia in a 3–1 friendly win on 25 March 2025.

== Career statistics ==
As of match played 12 April 2026

Appearances and goals by club, season and competition
Club	Season	League			National cup		European		Other		Total	
Club	Season	Division	Apps	Goals	Apps	Goals	Apps	Goals	Apps	Goals	Apps	Goals
Dinamo Tbilisi	2021	Erovnuli Liga	24	1	—		4 (Note: Two appearances in UEFA Champions League qualifiers and two appearances in UEFA Conference League qualifiers)	0	—		28	1
Dinamo Tbilisi	2023	Erovnuli Liga	1	0	—		—		—		1	0
Dinamo Tbilisi	2025	Erovnuli Liga	27	11	—		—		—		27	11
Dinamo Tbilisi	Total		52	12	0	0	4	0	0	0	56	12
Dinamo Tbilisi-2	2021	Liga 4	—		2	2	—		—		2	2
Dinamo Tbilisi-2	2022	Liga 3			2	1	—		—		2	1
Dinamo Tbilisi-2	2023	Erovnuli Liga 2	14	4	–		—		—		14	4
Dinamo Tbilisi-2	Total		14	4	4	3	0	0	0	0	18	7
Telavi (loan)	2023	Erovnuli Liga	16	2	1	0	—		2 (Note: Appearances in Erovnuli Liga playoffs)	0	19	2
Telavi (loan)	2024	Erovnuli Liga	31	6	3	0	—		2	0	36	6
Telavi (loan)	Total		47	8	4	0	0	0	4	0	55	8
HNK Rijeka	2026	Croatian Football League	10	0	1	0	2	0	—		13	0
Career total			123	24	9	3	6	0	4	0	142	27

== Honours ==
Dinamo Tbilisi

- Erovnuli Liga: 2020
- Georgian Super Cup: 2021

Individual

- Erovnuli Liga Goal of the Year: 2024
