= Levan Jordania =

Georgian association football player

Personal information
- Date of birth: 1 January 1997 (age 29)
- Place of birth: Tbilisi, Georgia
- Height: 1.92 m (6 ft 4 in)
- Position: Midfielder

Youth career
- 2011–2014: Vitesse
- 2014–2016: Achilles '29

Senior career*
Years	Team	Apps	(Gls)
2016–2017	Jong Achilles '29	19	(0)
2018–2019	Eindhoven	2	(0)
2019	Den Bosch	0	(0)
2020–2021	Locomotive Tbilisi	0	(0)
2021–2022	Austria Wien II	12	(0)
2022	Sioni Bolnisi	13	(0)
2023–2024	Gagra	24	(0)
2024–2025	Jedinstvo Ub	13	(0)
- * Club domestic league appearances and goals as of 15 June 2025

Levan Jordania (Georgian: ლევან ჟორდანია, romanized: levan zhordania; born 1 January 1997) is a Georgian professional footballer who plays as a midfielder.

== Career ==
Having spent time in the academies of Vitesse and Achilles '29, Jordania made his professional debut in September 2018 for Eindhoven, coming on as substitute in a 3-0 victory over Jong Ajax. In February 2021, he joined the reserve side of Austria Wien.

== Personal life ==
Jordania is the son of retired footballer and former Vitesse owner Merab Jordania.
